= St. Louis Cardinals =

Major League Baseball franchise

- 2026 St. Louis Cardinals season

Logo	Cap insignia
- Established in 1882

Major league affiliations
- National League (1892–present); Central Division (1994–present); East Division (1969–1993); American Association (1882–1891)

Current uniform
- Retired numbers: SL; 1; 2; 6; 9; 10; 14; 17; 20; 23; 24; 42; 45; 85; 42

Colors
- Cardinal red, navy blue, yellow, white

Name
- St. Louis Cardinals (1900–present); St. Louis Perfectos (1899); St. Louis Browns (1892–1898); St. Louis Browns (1883–1891) (AA); St. Louis Brown Stockings (1882) (AA)

Nicknames
- The Cards; The Redbirds; The Baseball Cardinals (1960–1987)

Ballpark
- Busch Stadium (2006–present); Busch Memorial Stadium (1966–2005) (Note: a.k.a. Busch Stadium (II) (1966–1982)); Robison Field (1893–1920) (Note: a.k.a. Cardinal Field (1917–1920), League Park (1899–1911), Sportsman's Park (II) (1893–1899)); Sportsman's Park (1882–1892, 1920–1966) (Note: a.k.a. Busch Stadium (I) (1953–1966))

Major league titles
- World Series titles (11): 1926; 1931; 1934; 1942; 1944; 1946; 1964; 1967; 1982; 2006; 2011
- NL pennants (19): 1926; 1928; 1930; 1931; 1934; 1942; 1943; 1944; 1946; 1964; 1967; 1968; 1982; 1985; 1987; 2004; 2006; 2011; 2013
- AA pennants (4): 1885; 1886; 1887; 1888
- Central division titles (12): 1996; 2000; 2002; 2004; 2005; 2006; 2009; 2013; 2014; 2015; 2019; 2022
- East division titles (3) (Note: In 1981, the Cardinals finished with the overall best record in the East Division. However, a players' strike in the middle of the season forced the season to be split into two halves. St. Louis finished second in both halves and was thereby deprived of a post-season appearance.): 1982; 1985; 1987
- Pre-modern World Series (1): 1886
- Wild card berths (5) (Note: In 2001, the Cardinals and the Houston Astros finished the season with identical records of 93–69 and finished tied for first place in the Central Division standings. The Cardinals claimed it was a shared championship but MLB disagreed. For playoff seeding, the NL Central slot went to Houston and St. Louis was awarded the wild card berth.): 2001; 2011; 2012; 2020; 2021

Front office
- Principal owner: William DeWitt Jr.
- President: Bill DeWitt III
- President of baseball operations: Chaim Bloom
- General manager: Rob Cerfolio
- Manager: Oliver Marmol
- Mascot: Fredbird
- Website: mlb.com/cardinals

The St. Louis Cardinals are an American professional baseball team based in St. Louis. The Cardinals compete in Major League Baseball (MLB) as a member club of the National League (NL) Central Division. Since the 2006 season, the Cardinals have played their home games at Busch Stadium in downtown St. Louis. One of the nation's oldest and most successful professional baseball clubs, the Cardinals have won 11 World Series championships, the most of any NL team and second in MLB only to the New York Yankees. The team has won 19 National League pennants, third-most of any team behind the Los Angeles Dodgers and San Francisco Giants. St. Louis has also won 15 division titles in the East and Central divisions.

In 1881, entrepreneur Chris von der Ahe purchased the Brown Stockings barnstorming club, renamed it the St. Louis Browns, and made it a charter member of the American Association baseball league. The team won four league championships, qualifying them to play in the era's professional baseball championship series, a forerunner of the modern World Series. In two of these championships, the Browns met the Chicago White Stockings, now the Chicago Cubs, launching the enduring Cardinals–Cubs rivalry.

In 1892, the Browns – also called the Perfectos – joined the National League. In 1900, the team was renamed the Cardinals (Two years later, an unrelated St. Louis Browns team joined the American League).

Notable Cardinals achievements include manager/owner Branch Rickey's invention of the farm system, Rogers Hornsby's two batting Triple Crowns, Dizzy Dean's 30-win season in 1934, Stan Musial's 17 MLB and 29 NL records, Bob Gibson's 1.12 earned run average (ERA) in 1968, Whitey Herzog's Whiteyball dynasty of the 1980s, Mark McGwire's single-season home run record in 1998, the 2011 championship team's unprecedented comebacks, and Albert Pujols’ 700th home run. The Cardinals have won 105 or more games in four seasons and won 100 or more nine times. Cardinals players have won 21 league MVPs, four batting Triple Crowns, and three Cy Young Awards. Baseball Hall of Fame inductees include Lou Brock, Dizzy Dean, Frankie Frisch, Bob Gibson, Chick Hafey, Jesse Haines, Whitey Herzog, Rogers Hornsby, Tony La Russa, Joe Medwick, Johnny Mize, Stan Musial, Red Schoendienst, Ted Simmons, Enos Slaughter, Ozzie Smith, and Billy Southworth.

In 2018, Forbes valued the Cardinals at $1.9 billion, the 7th-highest among MLB clubs and far more than the $147 million paid in 1995 by owner William DeWitt Jr.'s investment group. In 2017, the team took in revenue of $319 million on an operating income of $40.0 million. Chaim Bloom is the President of Baseball Operations and Oliver Marmol is the manager. The Cardinals are renowned for their strong fan support: despite being in one of the sport's mid-level markets, they routinely see attendances among the league's highest, and are consistently among the top three in MLB in local television ratings.

Through 2025, the Cardinals' all-time win-loss record is 11,363–10,486–152 (.520).

== History ==
=== Before the Cardinals (1875–1881) ===
Professional baseball began in St. Louis with the Brown Stockings of the National Association (NA) in 1875. The NA folded following that season, and the next season, St. Louis joined the National League as a charter member, finishing in third place at 45–19. George Bradley hurled the first no-hitter in Major League history. The NL expelled St. Louis from the league after 1877 due to a game-fixing scandal and the team went bankrupt. Without a league, they continued play as a semi-professional barnstorming team through 1881.

The magnitudes of the reorganizations following the 1877 and 1881 seasons are such that most historians do not count the 1875–1877 and 1878–1881 Brown Stockings teams as part of the current Cardinals' legacy.

=== American Association and early National League eras (1882–1919) ===
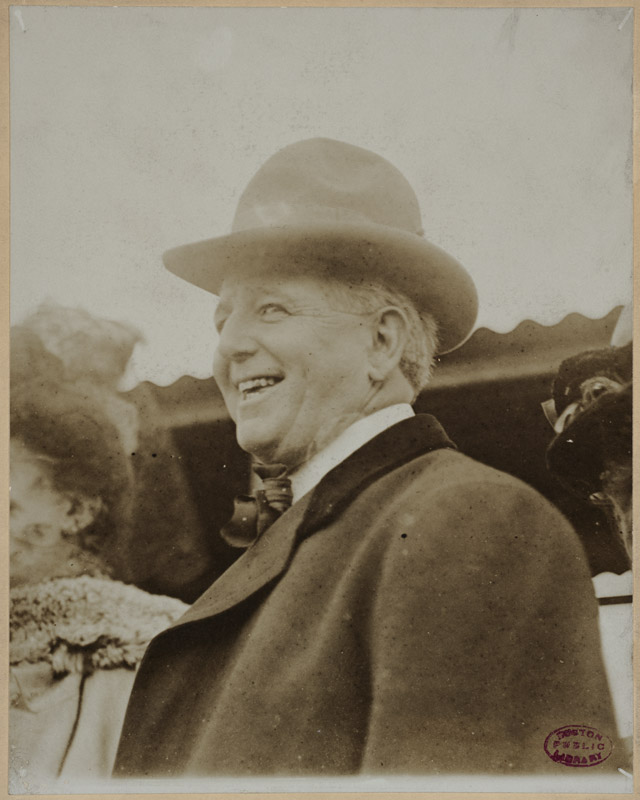
Charles Comiskey, shown here circa 1910, guided the Browns to four American Association titles.

For the 1882 season, Chris von der Ahe purchased the team, reorganized it, and made it a founding member of the American Association (AA), a league to rival the NL. 1882 is generally considered to be the first year of existence for the franchise which would later become known as the St. Louis Cardinals. (Note: Most sources consider the 1882 Brown Stockings to represent the beginning of the St. Louis Cardinals (if it was not the even earlier 1875 or 1878 clubs) but the St. Louis Cardinals baseball club itself considers its history to have begun in 1892 when the team (still called the St. Louis Browns) joined the National League.)

The next season, St. Louis shortened their name to the Browns. Soon thereafter they became the dominant team in the AA, as manager Charles Comiskey guided St. Louis to four pennants in a row from 1885 to 1888. Pitcher and outfielder Bob Caruthers led the league in ERA (2.07) and wins (40) in 1885 and finished in the top six in both in each of the following two seasons. He also led the AA in OBP (.448) and OPS (.974) in 1886 and finished fourth in batting average in 1886 (.334) and fifth in 1887 (.357). Outfielder Tip O'Neill won the first batting triple crown in franchise history in 1887 and the only one in AA history. By winning the pennant, the Browns played the NL pennant winner in a predecessor of the World Series. The Browns twice met the Chicago White Stockings—the predecessor to the Chicago Cubs—tying one in a heated dispute and winning the other, thus spurring the vigorous St. Louis–Chicago rivalry that ensues to this day. During the franchise's ten seasons in the AA, they compiled an all-time league-high of 780 wins and .639 winning percentage. They lost just 432 contests while tying 21 others.

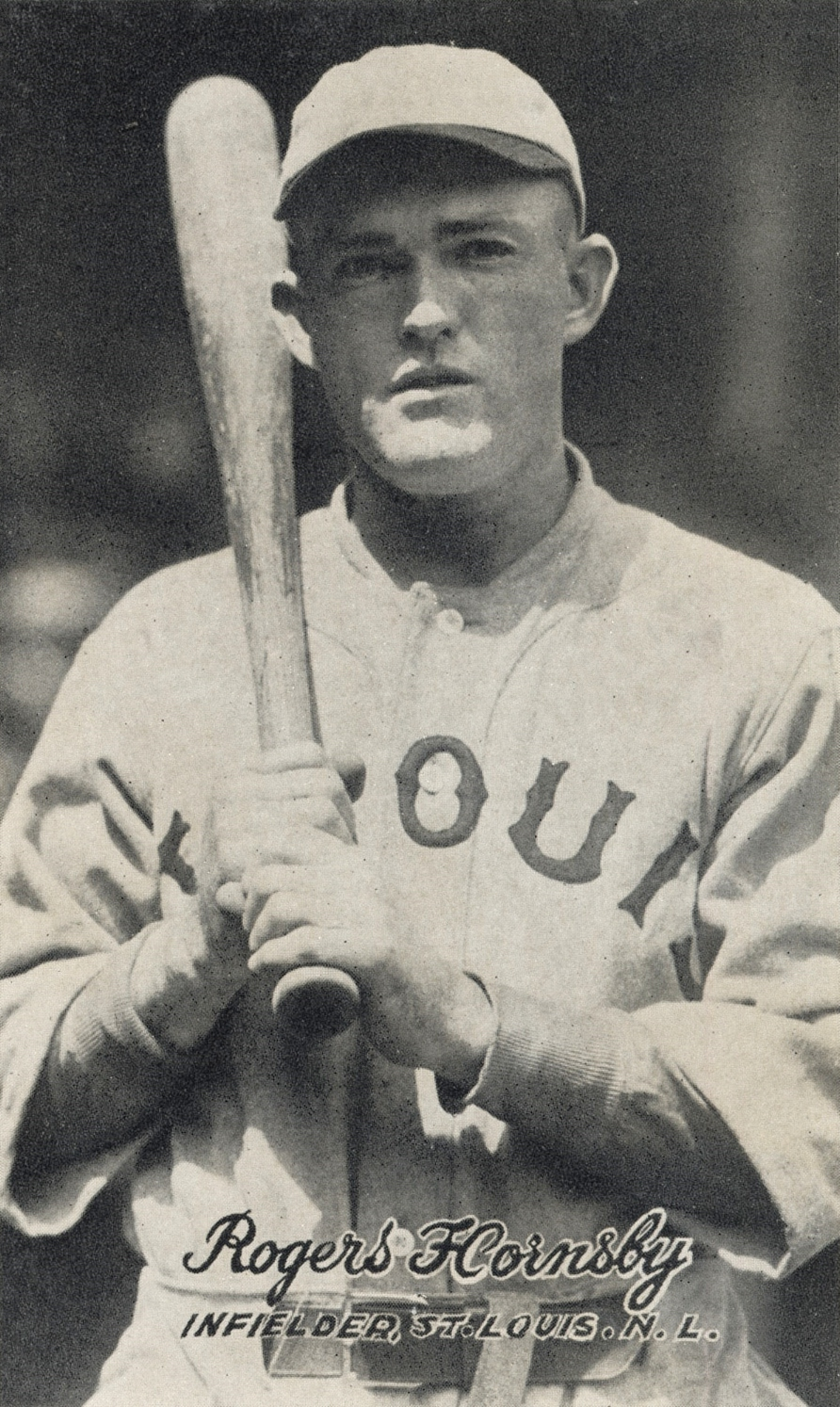
Rogers Hornsby won two Triple Crowns as a Cardinal.

The AA folded after the 1891 season and the Browns transferred to the National League. This time, the club entered an era of stark futility. Between 1892 and 1919, St. Louis managed just five winning seasons, finished in last or next-to-last place sixteen times, and ended four seasons with 100 losses or more. The nadir was the 1897 season: a 29–102 record for a franchise-worst .221 winning percentage. St. Louis' 84–67 finish as the Perfectos in 1899 would be the team's best finish between the AA era and Sam Breadon's purchase of the team. As the "Perfectos", the team wore their jersey with a cardinal red trim and sock striping. Later that season, St. Louis Republic sportswriter Willie McHale included an account in a column of a female fan he heard remarking about the uniforms, "What a lovely shade of cardinal." Fans liked the moniker "Cardinals" and, the next year in 1900, popularity for the nickname induced an official change to Cardinals.

In 1902, an American League team moved from Milwaukee into St. Louis, renamed themselves the St. Louis Browns and built a new park on the site of the Cardinals' old stadium, striking a rivalry that lasted five decades. Breadon bought a minority interest in the Cardinals in 1917, and in 1919, Browns manager Branch Rickey joined the Cardinals. The Cardinals' first 28 seasons in the NL were a complete reversal of their stay in the AA—with a .406 winning percentage, they compiled 1,632 wins, 2,425 losses and 74 ties.

=== Breadon era (1920–1952) ===
St. Louis baseball commenced a renaissance: since 1926 the Cardinals have won eleven World Series and nineteen NL pennants. Breadon spurred this revival when he bought out the majority stake in 1920 and appointed Rickey as business manager, who expanded scouting, player development, and pioneered the minor league farm system, filling the role of today's general manager. With Rogers Hornsby at second base, he claimed Triple Crowns in 1922 and 1925, and the Cardinals won the 1926 World Series, their first. St. Louis then won the league in 1928, 1930, and 1931 and the 1931 World Series.

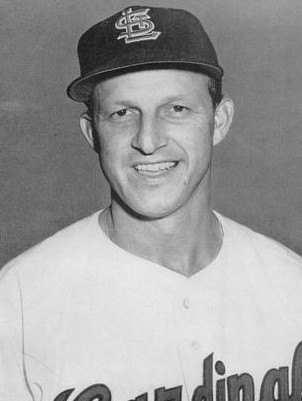
Stan "The Man" Musial

The Gashouse Gang edition claimed the 1934 World Series and the Cardinals amassed new thresholds of popularity far outside St. Louis via radio, which led to the coining of the term "Cardinals Nation". Dizzy Dean led the Gang, winning the 1934 MVP, and leading the NL multiple times in wins, strikeouts, innings, complete games and shutouts. Johnny Mize and Joe Medwick emerged as two power threats, with Medwick claiming the last Triple Crown for a Cardinal in 1937.

In the 1940s, a golden era emerged as Rickey's farm system became laden with such talent as Marty Marion, Enos Slaughter, Mort Cooper, Walker Cooper, Stan Musial, Max Lanier, Whitey Kurowski, Red Schoendienst and Johnny Beazley. It was one of the most successful decades in franchise history with 960 wins and 580 losses for a winning percentage higher than any other Major League team at .623. With Billy Southworth managing, they won the World Series in 1942 and 1944 (in the only all-St. Louis series against the Browns), and won 105 or more games each in 1942, 1943, and 1944. Southworth's managerial winning percentage (.642) is St. Louis' highest since the franchise joined the National League. Musial was considered the most consistent hitter of his era and most accomplished in team history, winning three MVPs and seven batting titles. St. Louis then won the 1946 World Series on Slaughter's Mad Dash in Game 7. Breadon was forced to sell the team in 1947 but won six World Series and nine NL pennants as owner. They remained competitive, finishing .500 or better in thirteen of the next seventeen seasons, but fell short of winning the league or World Series until 1964.

=== Gussie Busch era (1953–1989) ===
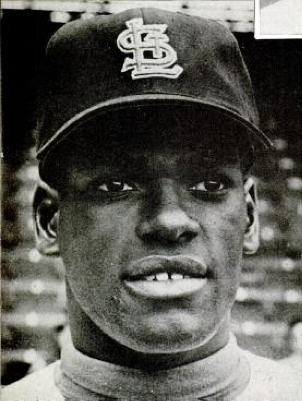
Bob Gibson, the most decorated pitcher in team history, won two Cy Young Awards.

In 1953, the Anheuser-Busch brewery bought the Cardinals and Gussie Busch became team president, spurring the Browns' departure in 1953 to Baltimore to become the Orioles, and making the Cardinals the only major league club in town. More success followed in the 1960s, starting with what is considered one of the most lopsided trades in Major League history, as St. Louis received outfielder Lou Brock from the Cubs for pitcher Ernie Broglio. MVP third baseman Ken Boyer and pitcher Bob Gibson led the club to a World Series win the same year and Curt Flood, Bill White, Curt Simmons, and Steve Carlton also made key contributions in this decade. In 1967, new arrival Orlando Cepeda won the MVP, helping to propel St. Louis to the World Series. The Cardinals won the league the following year behind their Major League-leading 2.49 staff ERA in what was an all-round record-breaking season of pitching dominance. Posting a modern-day record low ERA of 1.12 and striking out a one-game World Series-record of 17, Gibson won both the MVP and Cy Young awards that year. However, the Cardinals failed to repeat as World Series champions, blowing a 3–1 lead to the underdog Detroit Tigers.

In the 1970s, catcher/third baseman Joe Torre and first baseman Keith Hernandez each won MVPs, but the team's best finishes were second place and 90 wins. The team found their way back to the World Series three times in the 1980s, starting with manager Whitey Herzog and his Whiteyball style of play and another trade that altered course of the franchise: in 1982, shortstop Garry Templeton was shipped to the Padres for fellow shortstop Ozzie Smith. Widely regarded as one of the best defensive players in history, Smith ranks first all-time among shortstops in Gold Glove Awards (13), All-Star games (15), assists (8,375), and double plays (1,590). St. Louis won the 1982 World Series from the Milwaukee Brewers that fall. The Cardinals again won the league in 1985 and 1987. In the 1985 World Series, they faced-off with cross-state rivals Kansas City Royals for the first time in a non-exhibition game, but they lost the series after a controversial call in Game 6; the 1987 World Series saw them face off against the Minnesota Twins, but could only win all three of their games played at home in the seven-game series.

=== Bill DeWitt era (1996–present) ===
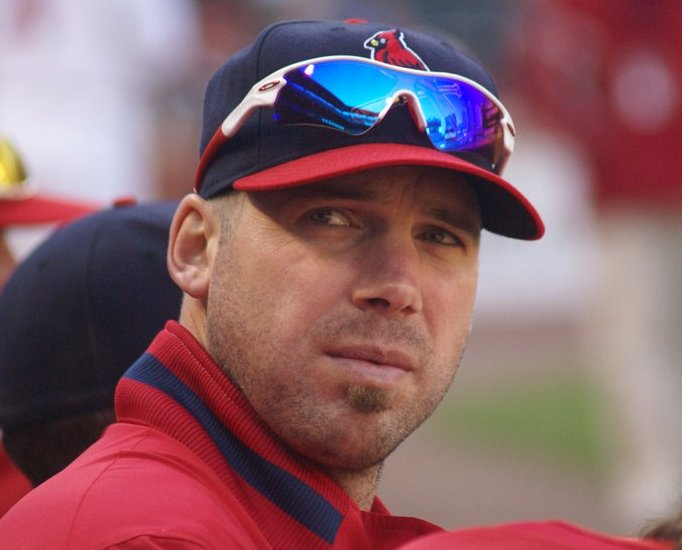
Pitcher Chris Carpenter, essential in two World Series titles, won 10 playoff games with a 3.00 postseason ERA.

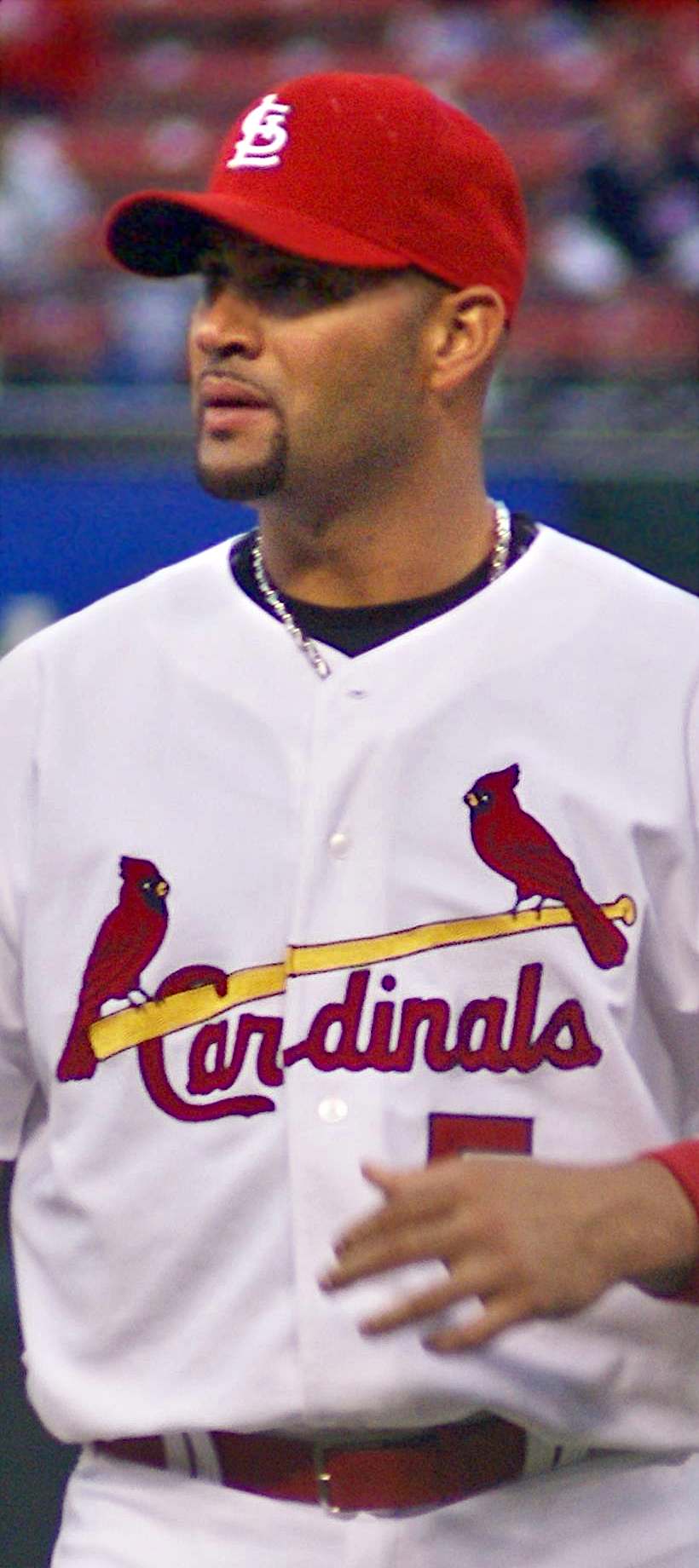
Albert Pujols is one of the most accomplished players in Cardinals' history.

After Gussie Busch died in 1989, the brewery took control and hired Joe Torre to manage late in 1990, then sold the team to an investment group led by William DeWitt Jr. after the 1995 season. Tony La Russa replaced Torre in the spring of 1996. In 1998, Mark McGwire competed with Sammy Sosa of the Cubs for a barrage of home runs in their pursuit of the single-season home run record. From 2000 to 2013, the Cardinals reestablished their way to the top with ten playoff appearances, four NL pennants, two World Series titles and 1,274 regular season wins against 993 losses for a .560 winning percentage, leading the National League and second in MLB only to the New York Yankees. With the addition of Jim Edmonds, Albert Pujols, and Scott Rolen, the Cardinals featured three prominent sluggers and defenders nicknamed "MV3;" Pujols won three MVPs and hit .326 with 469 home runs in his Cardinals career. In 2004, playoff stalwart Chris Carpenter's 3.09 ERA and 15 wins helped power the team to a major-league best 105 wins and take the NL pennant. In 2006, beset with injuries and inconsistency, they won the World Series, beating Detroit in five games to set an all-time record-low of 83 wins for a World Series winner.

In 2009, the Cardinals reached 10,000 wins, dating to when they first played in the American Association (AA). (Note: Although the St. Louis Cardinals do not officially recognize their era in the American Association (AA) as part of their Major League history, Major League Baseball recognized that incarnation of the AA in 1968, as well as other historic leagues, existing as former Major Leagues.) St. Louis returned to the playoffs in 2011–led by Pujols, Lance Berkman, Matt Holliday, Chris Carpenter, and Yadier Molina–first surmounting the largest games-won deficit after 130 games (at 10.5) to upstage the Atlanta Braves on the final day for the wild card playoff berth. In Game 3 of the World Series, Pujols became just the third player to hit three home runs in a World Series game. In Game 6, David Freese and Berkman each tied the score on the Cardinals' final strike—the first such occurrence in any game in MLB history—and St. Louis defeated the Texas Rangers later that game with a walk-off home run from Freese. After winning that Series, La Russa retired and became the only manager to do so after winning a title. He also finished with the most wins for managers in franchise history with 1,408.

La Russa's successor, Mike Matheny, helped extend St. Louis' playoff run as he became the first manager in the division play era to guide the Cardinals to the NLCS and playoffs in his first two seasons. In 2014, the Cardinals extended their NLCS streak to 4, with their 3–1 series victory over the Dodgers, in the NLDS. Ten days after being eliminated from the postseason by the San Francisco Giants, rookie outfielder Oscar Taveras was killed in a car accident while traveling to his hometown Puerto Plata in the Dominican Republic. On November 17, they acquired Atlanta Braves right-fielder Jason Heyward (who had just come off a Gold Glove-winning season) to replace Taveras. On June 16, 2015, the Federal Bureau of Investigation and the Justice Department started an investigation on the Cardinals for possibly hacking the Houston Astros. The hacking incident was perpetrated by Scouting Director Chris Correa. For the first time since the 2007–2008 seasons, the Cardinals missed the playoffs in consecutive years, 2016–2017.

After a rough start to the 2018 season, the Cardinals fired Matheny and named Mike Shildt interim manager. Shildt was made the permanent manager a month later.

For the 2019 season, the team announced that the "Victory Blue" uniforms, worn during the late 1970s and 1980s, would be returning. The uniforms, integrating the powder blue color with the team's current "Saturday alternate" jersey design, were to be worn during Saturday road games. The Cardinals traded for multi-time all stars Paul Goldschmidt and Nolan Arenado, and Albert Pujols returned to the team for his final season in 2022.

In 2022, long-time starting pitcher-catcher duo Adam Wainwright and Yadier Molina set the NL/AL record for most starts as a duo, also referred to as a battery, at 325 starts together going back to 2007. The previous record holding duo, Mickey Lolich and Bill Freehan, had held the record since 1975.

In 2026, Jordan Walker became the first Cardinal to win the Home Run Derby. The victory earned him $1 million prize and helped put him in the spotlight during All-Star Week.

== Ballpark ==
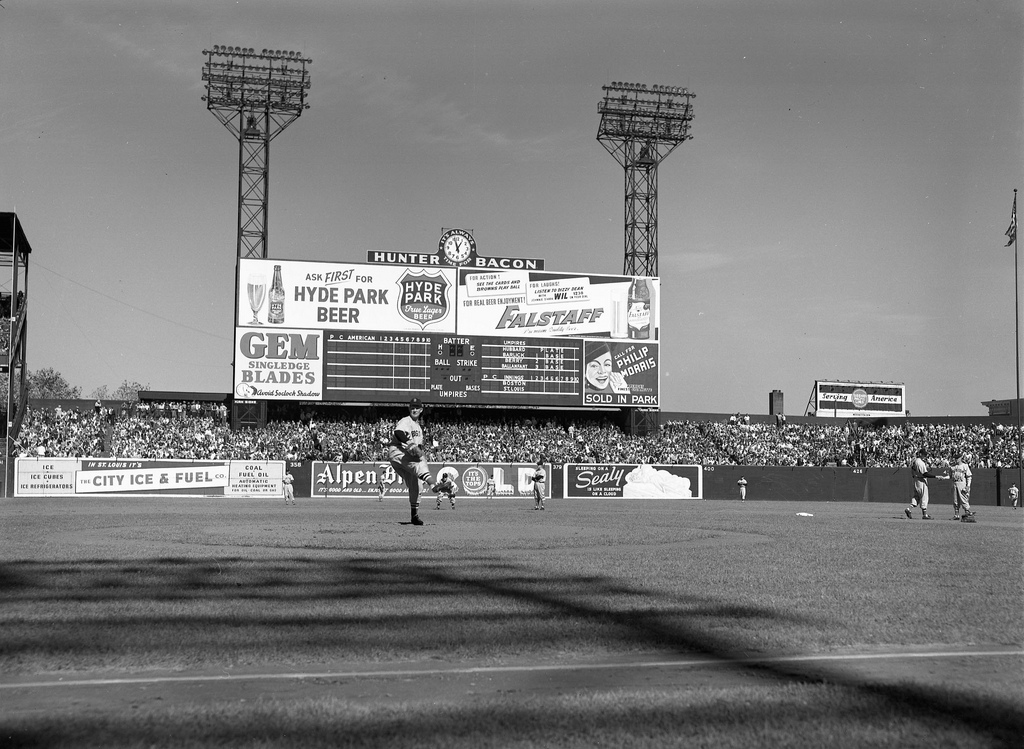
Sportsman's Park during the 1946 World Series

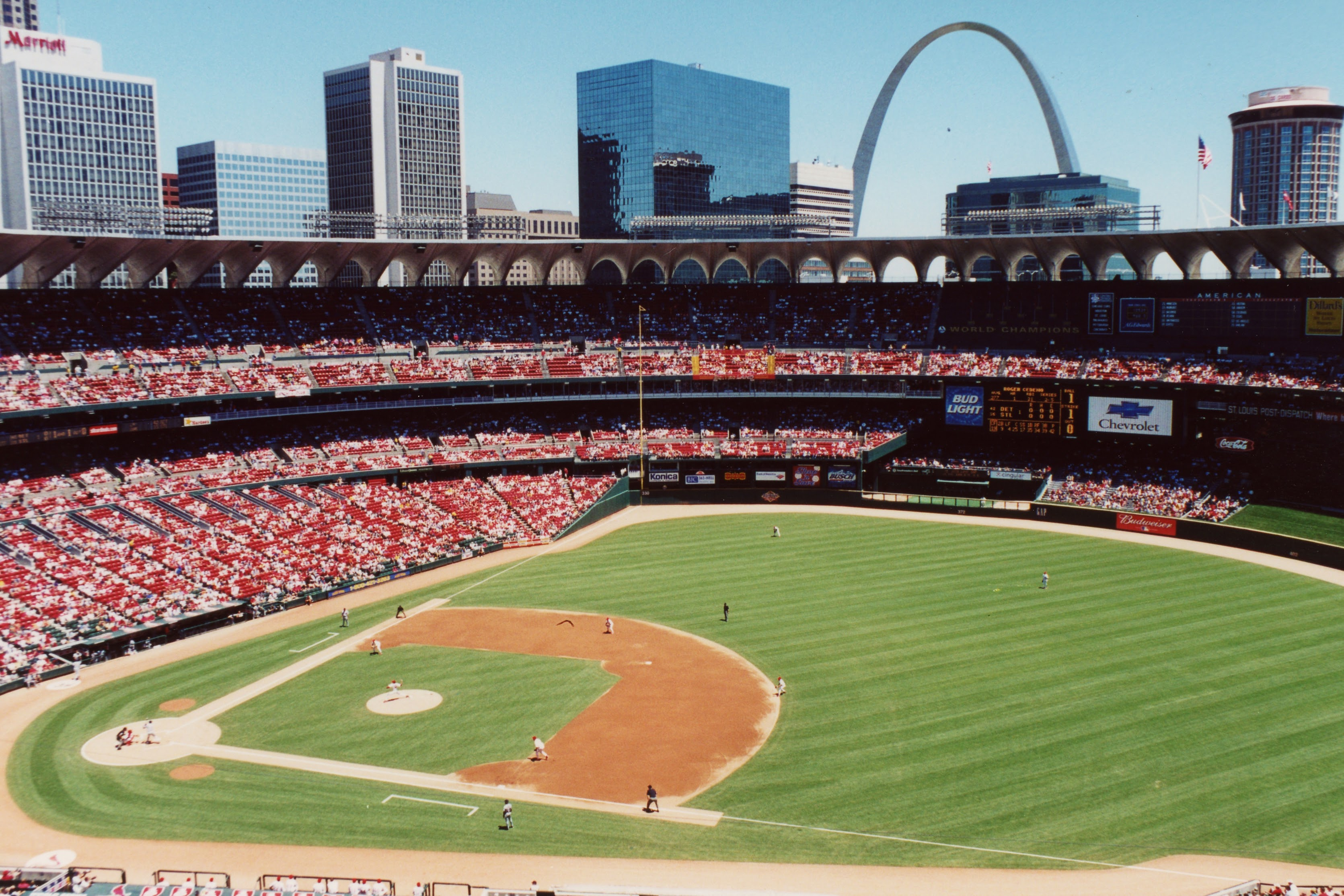
Busch Memorial Stadium, home stadium from 1966 to 2005

The Cardinals play their home games at Busch Stadium (also referred to as New Busch Stadium or Busch III) in downtown St. Louis, straddling 7th and Clark near the intersection of Interstates 64, 55, and 44. The stadium opened for the 2006 season at a cost of $411 million and holds a normal capacity of 46,861. The Cardinals finished their inaugural season in the new Busch Stadium by winning the 2006 World Series, the first team to do so since the New York Yankees in 1923. This open-air stadium emulates the HOK Sport (now Populous Holdings)-designed "retro-style" baseball-only parks built since the 1990s. The open panoramic perspective over the outfield wall offers a remarkable view of St. Louis' downtown skyline featuring the distinctive Gateway Arch. A replica of the Eads Bridge spans the entrance to the park on the third base side, while the statue of Stan Musial stands in front of that entrance. Other statues at the corner of 8th and Clark include Hall of Famers Rogers Hornsby, Ozzie Smith, George Sisler, Cool Papa Bell, Bob Gibson, Jack Buck, and others.

Due to increased demand, Game 7 of the 2011 World Series accommodated a baseball record of 47,399 by increasing the number of standing-room only tickets.

Ballpark Village is a mixed-use development located across Clark Street from Busch Stadium. Phase 1 of the development, completed for the start of the 2014 season, includes entertainment venues, restaurants, and retail. Anchored by Cardinals Nation (which includes the Cardinals Hall of Fame and Museum, a two-story Cardinals-themed restaurant and rooftop seating for 300+ fans with views of the field across the street), a 20,000 sq ft (1,900 m^{2}) Budweiser Brew House, FanDuel Sports Network Midwest Live! and PBR, the $100 million phase 1 development of Ballpark Village is intended to be a gathering space throughout the year, not just during the baseball season.

=== Previous ballparks ===
Busch Stadium is the Cardinals' fourth home ballpark and the third to bear that name. The Cardinals' original home ballpark was Sportsman's Park from 1882 to 1892 when they played in the American Association and were known as the Browns. In 1893, the Browns moved to a new ballpark five blocks northwest of Sportsman's Park which would serve as their home through 1920. The new park was originally called New Sportsman's Park but became more commonly referred to as Robison Field. Midway through the 1920 season, the Cardinals abandoned Robison Field and returned to the original Sportsman's Park and became tenants of their American League rivals, the St. Louis Browns. In 1953, the Anheuser-Busch Brewery purchased the Cardinals and the new owner subsequently also purchased Sportsman's Park from the Browns and renamed it Busch Stadium, later becoming Busch I. The Browns then left St. Louis for Baltimore after the season, becoming the Orioles. The Cardinals built Busch Memorial Stadium, or Busch II, in downtown St. Louis, opened it during the 1966 season and played there until 2005. It was built as the multi-purpose stadium home of both the baseball Cardinals and the football Cardinals, who are now the Arizona Cardinals; the NFL's St. Louis Rams also played the first four games of their home schedule upon their arrival in St. Louis in 1995. The current Busch Stadium was constructed partly atop the site of Busch Memorial Stadium.

=== Spring training ===
The Cardinals home field in spring training is Roger Dean Stadium in Jupiter, Florida. They share the complex, which opened in 1998, with the Miami Marlins. Before moving to Jupiter, the Cardinals hosted spring training at Al Lang Stadium in St. Petersburg, Florida from 1937 to 1997.

=== Regular season home attendance ===
Cardinal cheerleaders interacting with the crowd.

The Cardinals exceeded the attendance total of 3 million every season from 2004 to 2019. Every season from 2013 to 2019, the Cardinals finished second in MLB in home game attendance, only ever surpassed by the Los Angeles Dodgers.

Home Attendance at Busch Stadium
Year	Total attendance	Game average	League rank
2000	3,396,493	41,191	1st of 16
2001	3,109,578	37,922	3rd of 16
2002	3,011,756	37,182	4th of 16
2003	2,910,386	35,931	4th of 16
2004	3,048,427	37,635	6th of 16
2005	3,538,988	43,691	2nd of 16
2006	3,407,104	42,589	2nd of 16
2007	3,552,180	43,854	3rd of 16
2008	3,432,917	42,382	3rd of 16
2009	3,343,252	41,275	3rd of 16
2010	3,301,218	40,756	3rd of 16
2011	3,093,954	38,197	3rd of 16
2012	3,262,109	40,273	4th of 16
2013	3,369,769	41,602	2nd of 15
2014	3,540,649	43,712	2nd of 15
2015	3,520,889	43,467	2nd of 15
2016	3,444,490	42,524	2nd of 15
2017	3,448,337	42,572	2nd of 15
2018	3,403,587	42,020	2nd of 15
2019	3,480,393	42,968	2nd of 15
2020	N/A (COVID-19 pandemic)	N/A	N/A
2021	2,102,530	25,957	4th of 15
2022	3,320,551	40,994	2nd of 15
2023	3,241,091	40,013	3rd of 15
2024	2,878,115	35,532	6th of 15
2025	2,250,007	27,778	11th of 15

== Logos and uniforms ==
The Cardinals current Cap Insignia, and logo 2020–present.

The Cardinals have had few logos throughout their history, although those logos have evolved over time. The first logo associated with the Cardinals was an interlocking "SL" that appeared on the team's caps and or sleeves as early as 1899 or 1900 (depending on the source). Those early uniforms usually featured the name "St. Louis" on white home and gray road uniforms which both had cardinal red accents. During an 1899 road trip to Chicago, a girl in the stands remarked, "Oh, isn't that a lovely shade of cardinal." The team, known as the Perfectos at the time, changed its name to Cardinals the following season. In 1920, the "SL" largely disappeared from the team's uniforms, and for the next 20 years the team wore caps that were white with red striping and a red bill.

In 1922, the Cardinals wore uniforms for the first time that featured two cardinal birds perched on a baseball bat over the name "Cardinals" with the letter "C" of the word hooked over the bat. The concept of the birds originated after general manager Branch Rickey noticed a colorful cardboard arrangement featuring cardinal birds on a table in a Presbyterian church in Ferguson, Missouri, at which he was speaking. The arrangement's production was by a woman named Allie May Schmidt. Schmidt's father, a graphic designer, helped Rickey make the logo a familiar staple on Cardinals uniforms. While the team had been known as the Cardinals for over 20 years by then, this logo changed the perception from the color to the bird. The now-famous "birds on the bat" design initially appeared with the birds perched on a black bat and "Cardinals" in printed letters. An alternate version of this logo with "St. Louis" replacing "Cardinals" appeared in 1930 and was the primary logo in 1931 and 1932 before "Cardinals" returned. In 1940, the now-familiar "StL" logo was introduced on the team's caps. The interlocking "StL" has undergone several slight modifications over the years but has appeared on the team's caps every year since. The first appearance of the "STL" in 1940 coincided with the introduction of navy blue as a uniform color. From 1940 until 1955, the team wore navy blue caps with red bills and a red interlocking "StL" while the jerseys featured both cardinal red and navy blue accents. In 1951, the "birds on the bat" logo was changed to feature a yellow baseball bat.

In 1956, the Cardinals changed their caps to solid blue with a red "StL", removing the red bill. Also, for that season only, the Cardinals wore a script "Cardinals" wordmark on their uniforms excluding the "birds on the bat". An updated version of the "birds on the bat" logo returned in 1957 with the word "Cardinals" written in cursive beneath the bat; this logo, with some incremental changes along the way, has been the team's logo since. In 1962, the Cardinals became the first National League team (and the second in all of Major League Baseball after the Chicago White Sox in 1960) to display players' names on the back of their jerseys. In 1964, while retaining their blue caps for road games, the Cardinals changed their home caps to all red with first a blue (with white trim), than a white (with black trim), interlocking "StL". The next year, the red caps were the only cap worn by the team full-time. In 1967, the birds on the bat emblem on the jersey was again tweaked, making the birds more realistic and changing the position of their tails relative to the bat and this version remained on all Cardinals game jerseys through 1997.

In 1971, following the trend in baseball at the time, the Cardinals replaced the traditional flannel front-button shirts and pants with belts with new pullover knit jerseys and beltless elastic waist pants. In 1973, the crew-neck collar became a V-neck. Another trend in baseball led the Cardinals to change their road uniforms from gray to light blue from 1976 to 1984; the player numbers were worn on the sleeves in 1979 and 1980. In 1992, the Cardinals returned to wearing traditional button-down shirts and pants with belts. That same year, they also brought back the all-navy cap with a red "StL", which were last worn in 1964, for use on the road only while wearing the same red and white cap for home games.

In 1998, the "birds on the bat" was updated for the first time in 30 years with more detailed birds and bolder letters. That year, St. Louis introduced a cap featuring a single cardinal bird perched on a bat worn for Sunday home games only. Up until 2020, the alternate "bird" caps were paired with their primary "StL" red batting helmets, but in the 2021 season, the Cardinals added a new helmet to match their home Sunday alternate caps. The new birds on the bat design was modified again the next year, with yellow beaks and white eyes replacing the red beaks and yellow eyes of the 1998 version. Uniform numbers also returned to the front of the jerseys in 1999 after a two-year absence.

On November 16, 2012, the Cardinals unveiled a new alternate uniform to be worn at home games on Saturdays beginning with the 2013 season. The modified jersey, cream-colored with red trim on the sleeves and down the front, retains the "birds on the bat" but is the first since 1932 in which "St. Louis" is used instead of "Cardinals". 2013 also saw the team adopt their red caps as their main cap for both home and away games for the first time since 1991; the navy cap was retained as an alternate, used when visiting other teams with red home caps.

Starting with the 2019 season, the Cardinals have worn updated powder blue alternate uniforms during Saturday road games. Like the Saturday home cream alternates, it features red piping and "St. Louis" below the "birds on the bat" logo. In 2020, the Cardinals introduced a slightly updated version of their "StL" cap logo (featuing blue trim on the white logo), which was "soft launched" in 2019 via their social media accounts and game broadcasts.

In 2023, the Cardinals introduced Stifel as its first uniform sponsor. The Stifel patch, which has red letters with the background color corresponding to the team's uniform, is placed on either sleeve depending on a player's handedness.

In 2024, the Cardinals unveiled their City Connect uniform. The red-based uniform with white pants maintained the trademark "birds on the bat" logo in front, but with the script "The Lou" in white trimmed in navy blue instead of either the city or team name. "The Lou" paid homage to rapper Nelly, a St. Louis native who once coined the city's nickname on his 2000 single Country Grammar. Darker red wavy pinstripes were an allusion to the Mississippi River where St. Louis is situated. A red circular patch containing a yellow fleur-de-lis, a navy blue illustration of the Gateway Arch, and a red "STL" wordmark, is placed on either sleeve. Caps are red and featured the aforementioned "STL" wordmark in white with navy blue trim.

On August 12, 2026, after a fan poll, the Cardinals announced they would return to wearing navy caps with the primary gray uniform full-time on road games for the first time since 2012, effective August 14 onward.

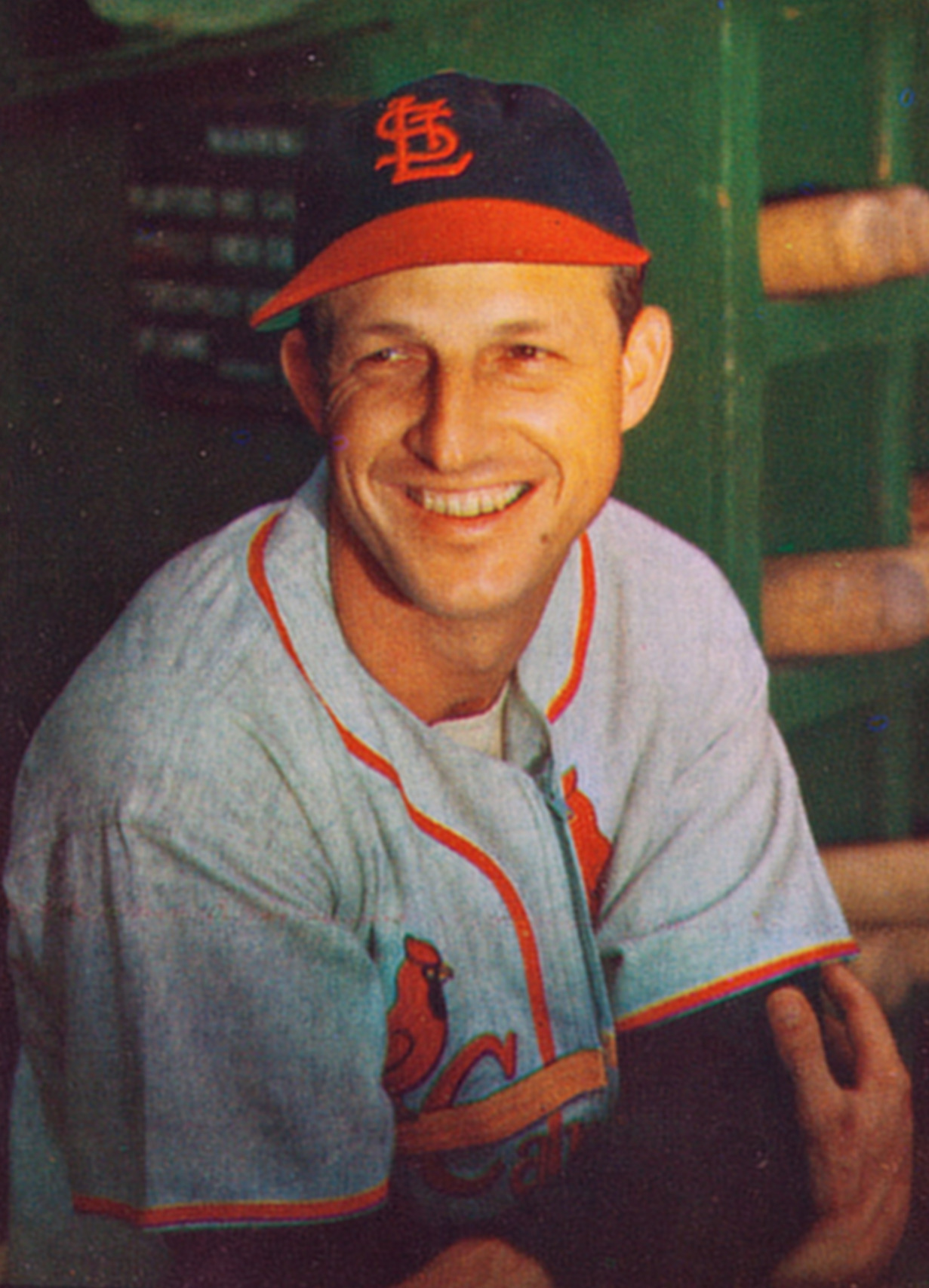
Stan Musial wearing the Cardinals' 1950s road uniform with the original navy cap and red bill.

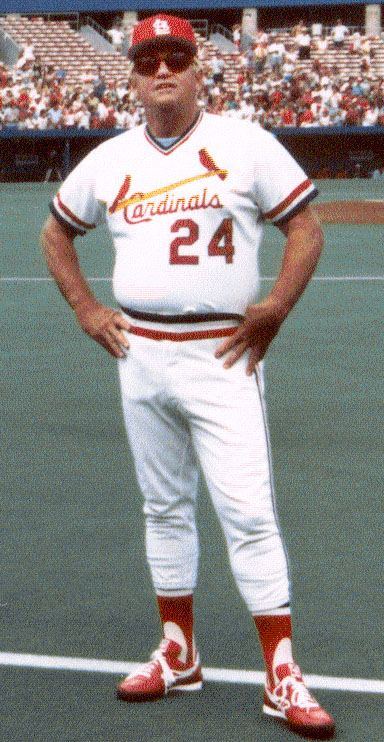
Whitey Herzog wearing the Cardinals' home pullover uniform, used from 1971 to 1991.

Vince Coleman, Willie McGee and Ozzie Smith wearing the Cardinals' road pullover uniform, used from 1985 to 1991.

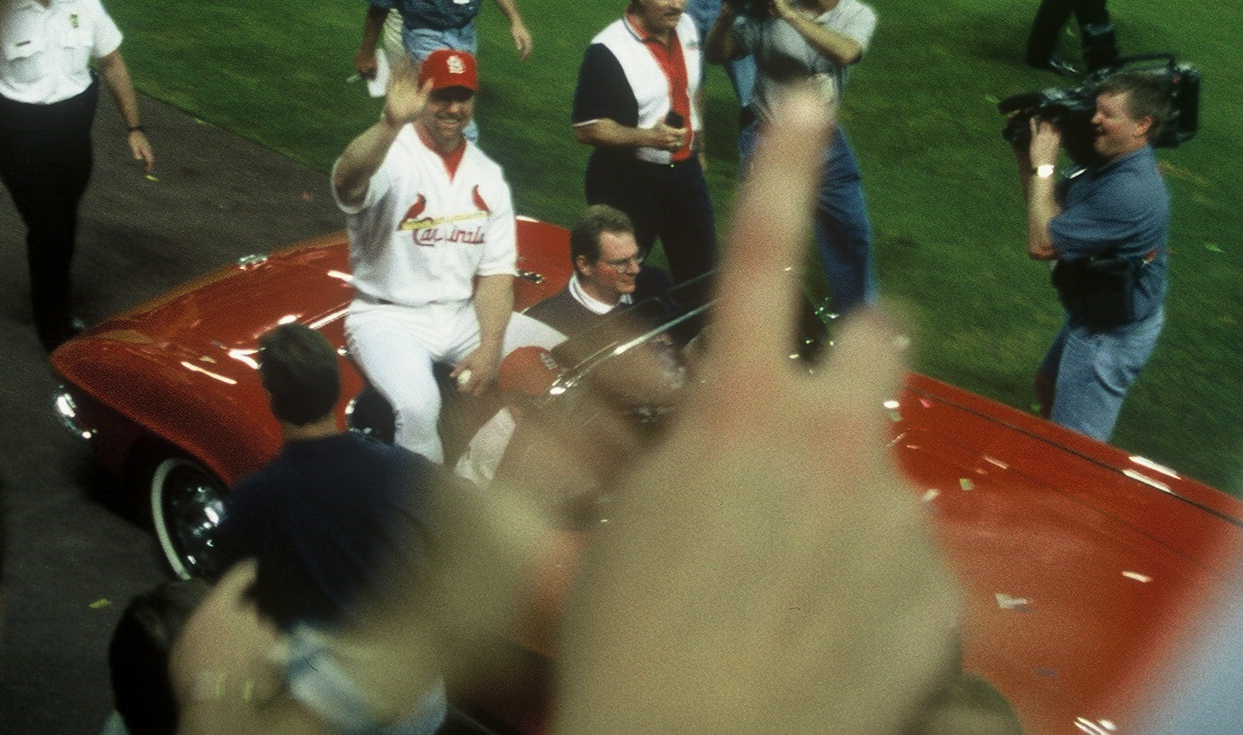
Mark McGwire wearing the Cardinals' home uniform in 1998 without chest numbers.

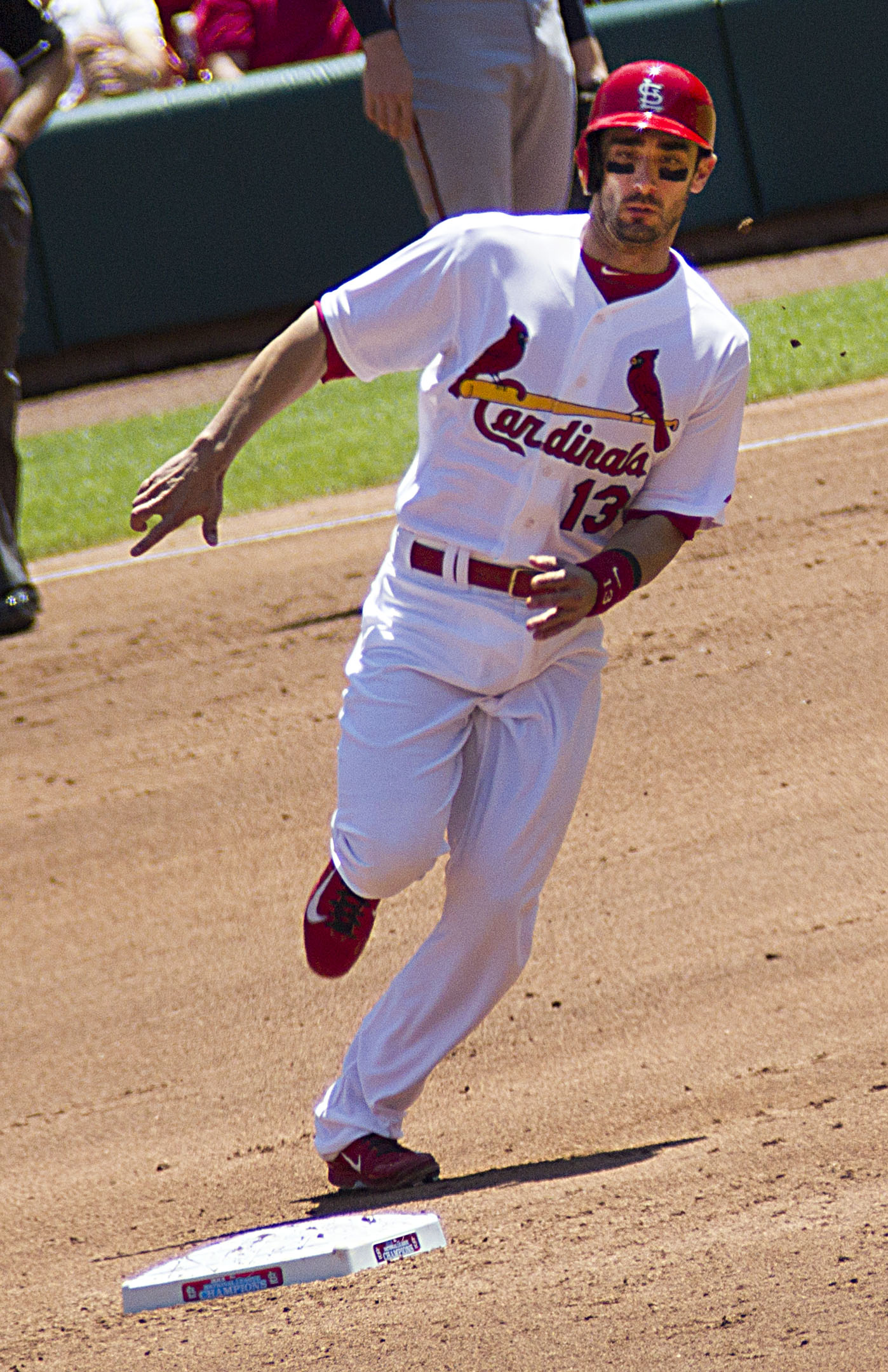
Matt Carpenter wearing the Cardinals' current home uniform with the all-red batting helmet.

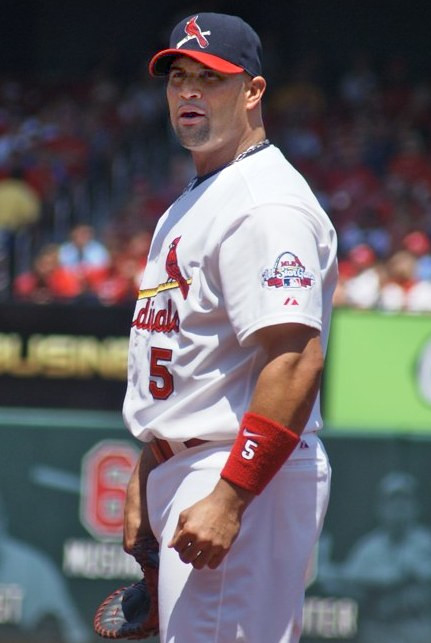
Albert Pujols wearing the Cardinals' current home uniform with the alternate Sunday 'bird-on-a-bat' cap.

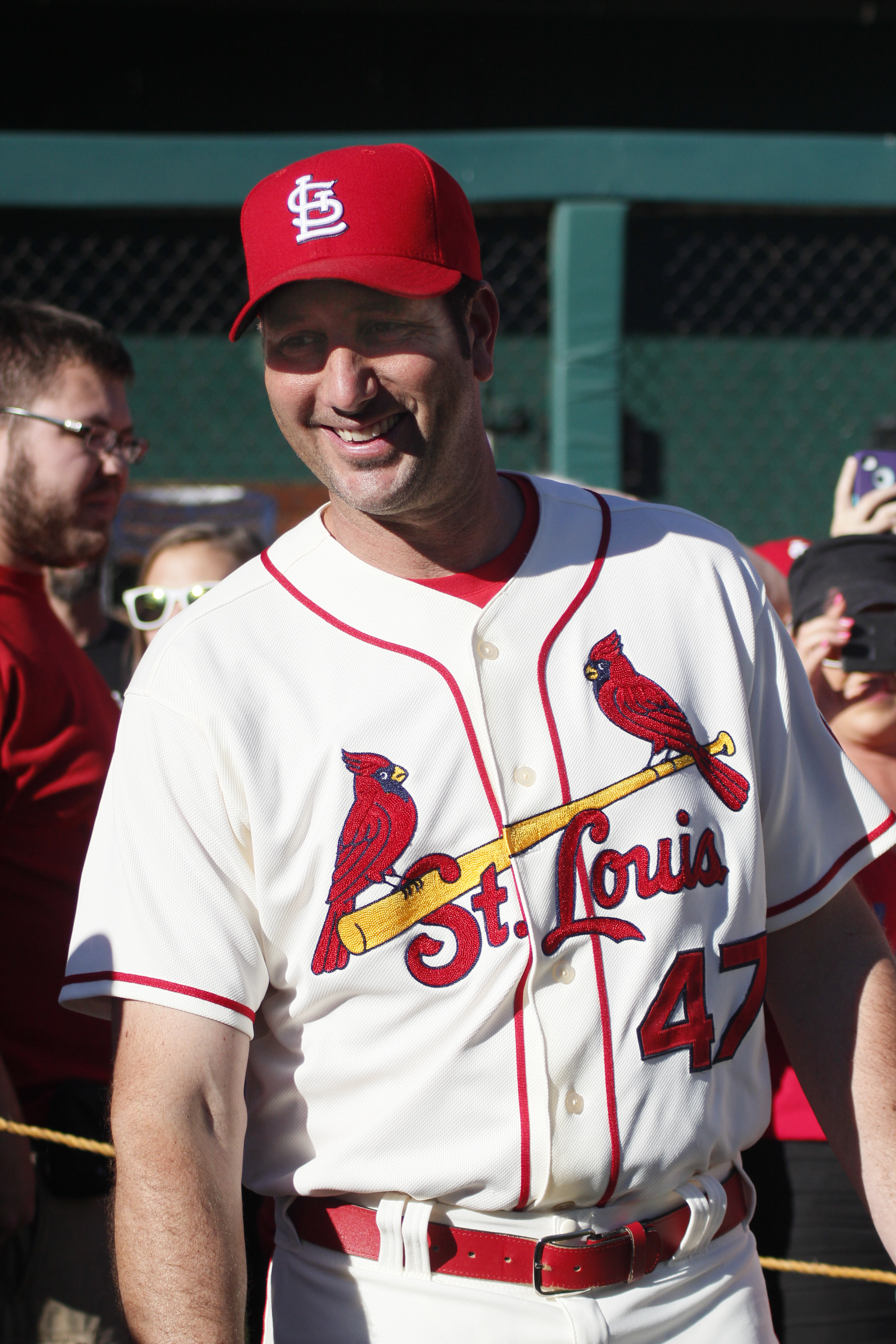
John Mabry wearing the Cardinals' current Saturday alternate home uniform.

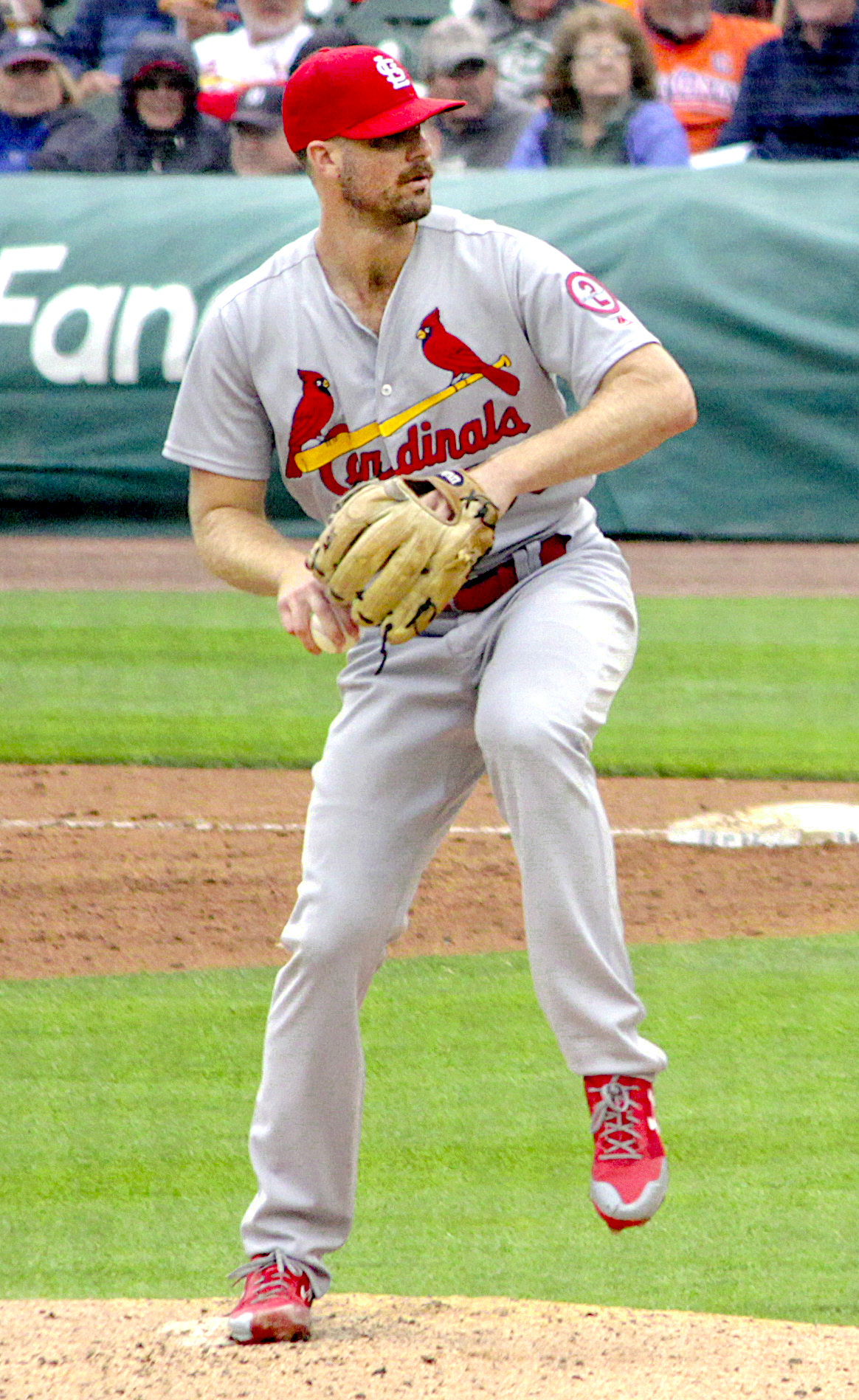
John Gant wearing the Cardinals' current road uniform with the primary all-red cap.

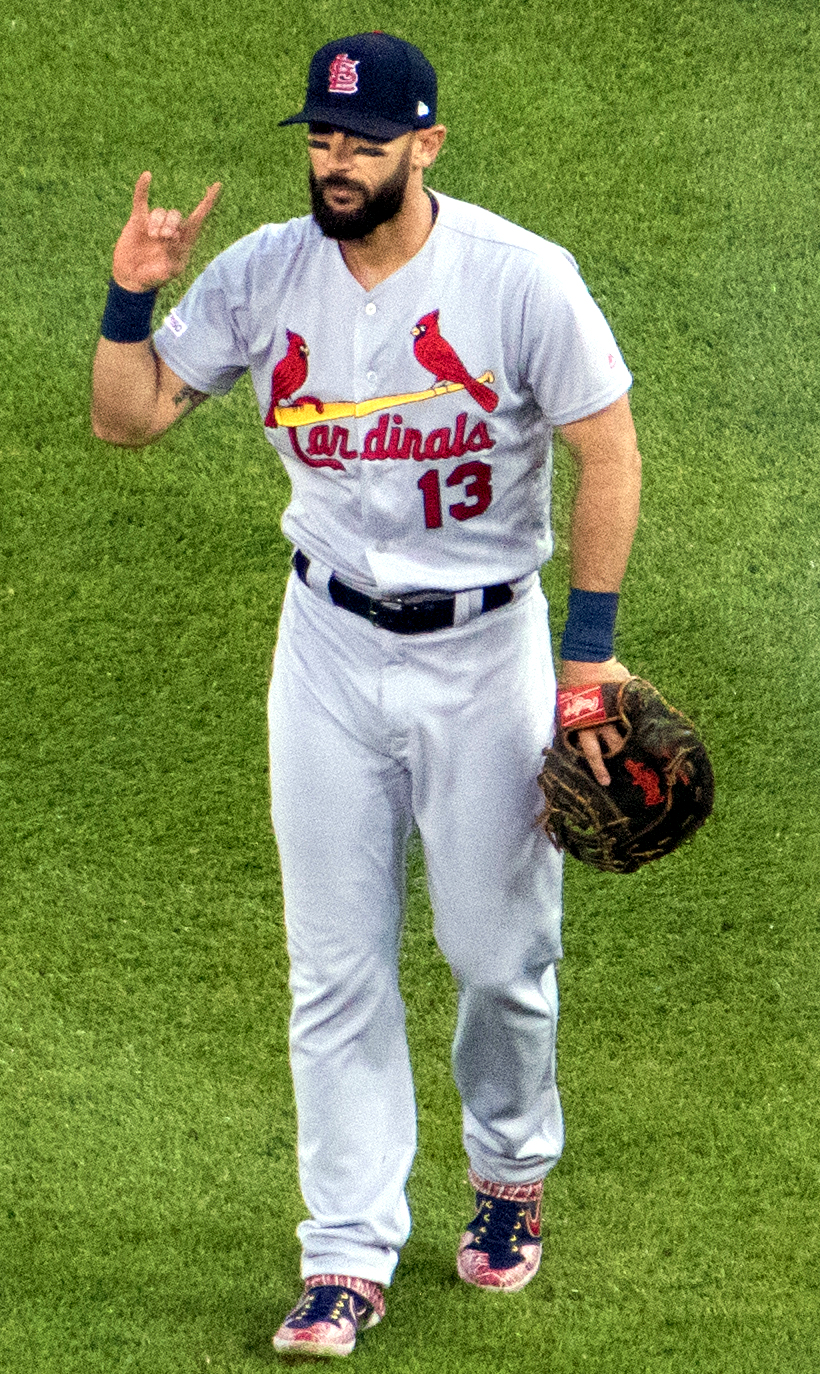
Matt Carpenter wearing the Cardinals' current road uniform with the alternate all-navy cap.

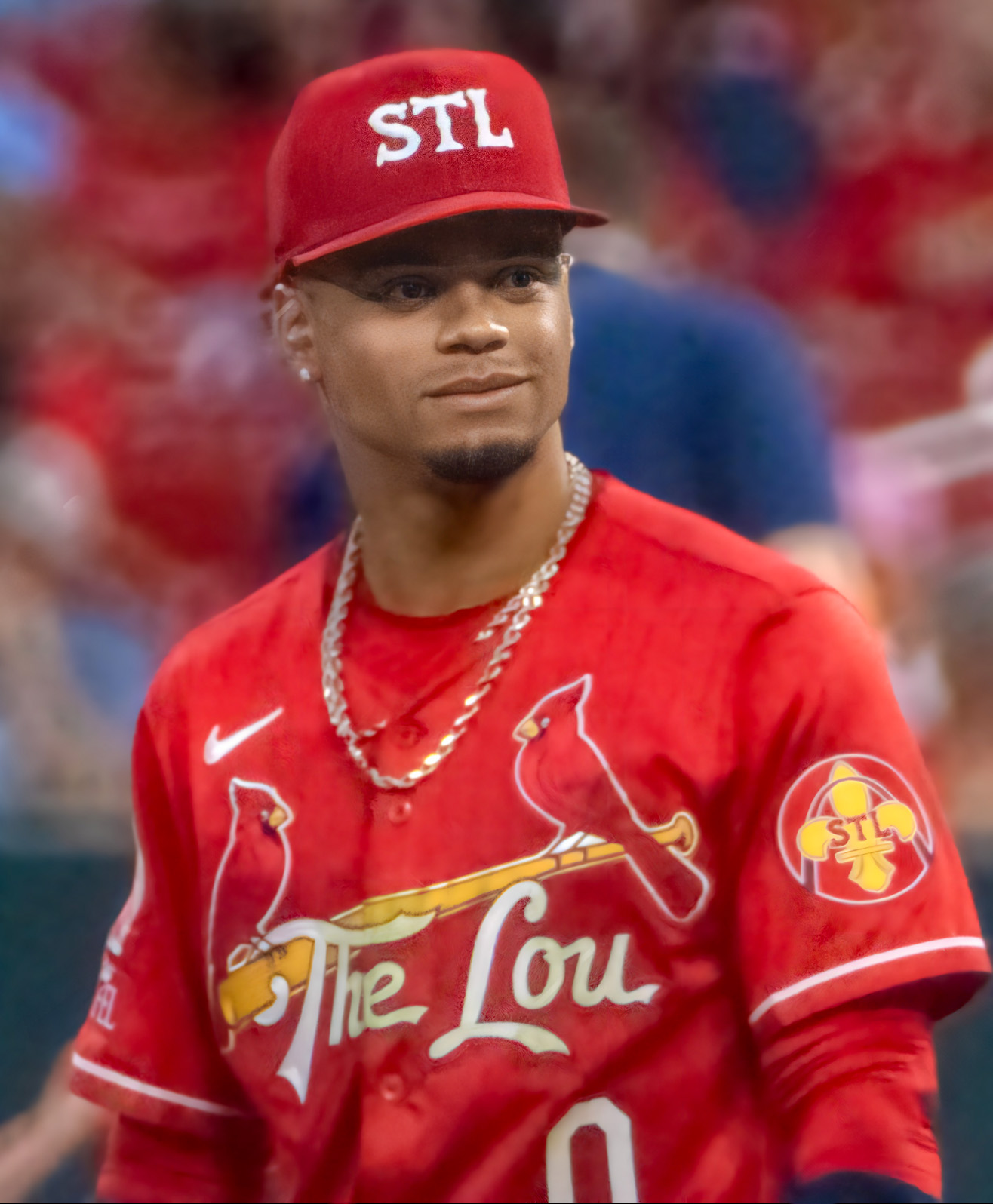
Masyn Winn wearing the Cardinals' City Connect uniform.

== Support ==
=== Mascots ===
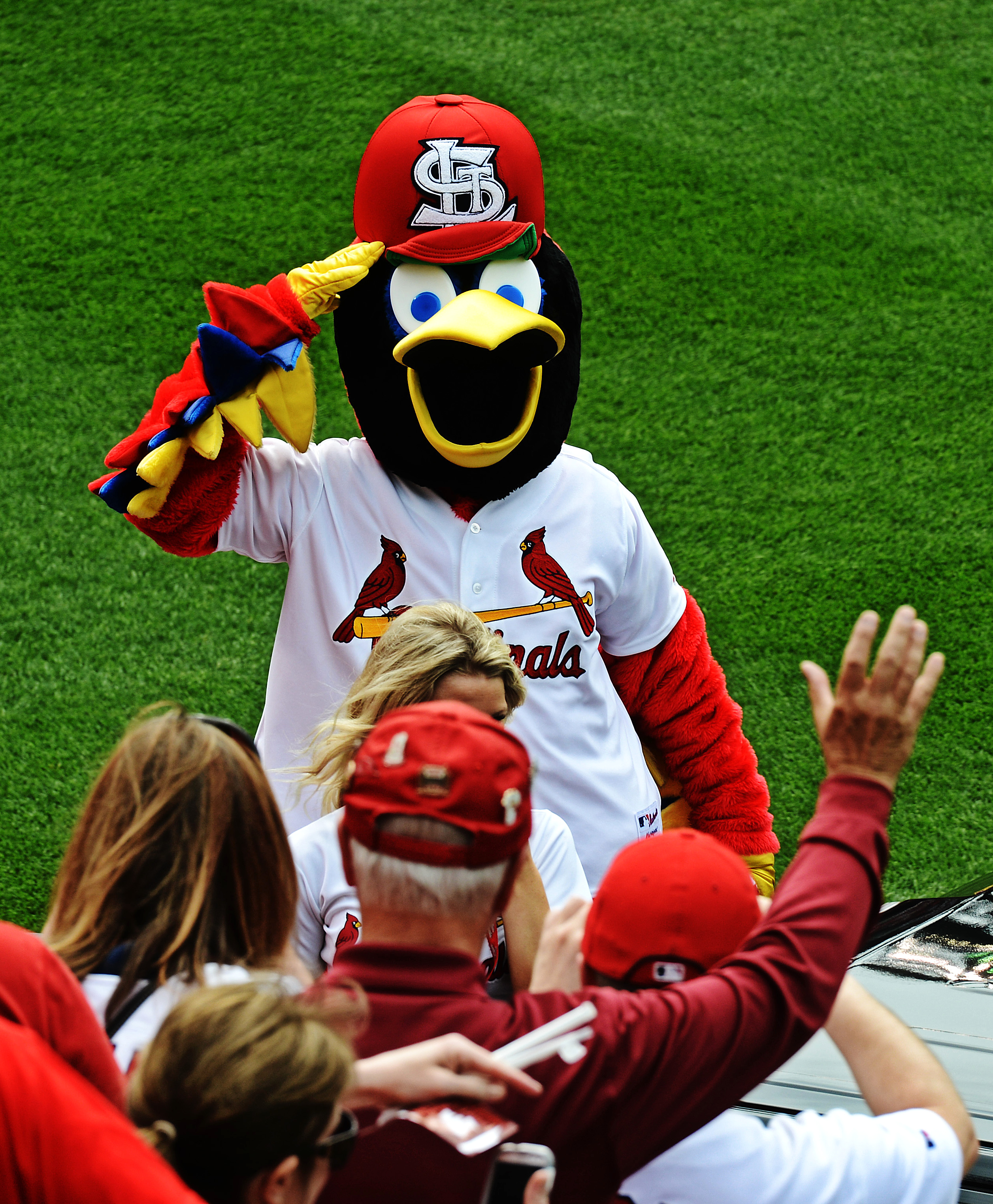
St. Louis mascot Fredbird, 2013

The team mascot is an anthropomorphic cardinal wearing the team's uniform named Fredbird. He is assisted by Team Fredbird, a group of eleven women who entertain fans from the field and on top of the dugouts.

While unofficial, the Rally Squirrel became an unexpected phenomenon during the 2011 postseason. Making its "debut" in Game 3 of the NLDS on October 4, a squirrel ran across home plate in the middle of a pitch from Roy Oswalt of the Phillies to the Cardinals' Skip Schumaker. The Cardinals would win Game 4 and subsequently Game 5 (October 7) in Philadelphia to advance to the NLCS, symbolizing the squirrel's "role" in the victory. The squirrel was popularized as "Buschie the Rally Squirrel". As a tribute to the popularity of the squirrel, a small depiction of the Rally Squirrel is also included on the official World Series rings the team received. It shows up under the "STL" logo on the side of the ring.

== Rivalries ==
=== Chicago Cubs ===
The Cardinals–Cubs rivalry refers to games between the Cardinals and the Chicago Cubs. The rivalry is also known as the Downstate Illinois rivalry or the I-55 Series (in earlier years as the Route 66 Series) as both cities are located along Interstate 55 (which itself succeeded the famous U.S. Route 66). The Cubs lead the series 1,295-1,241, through August 2026, while the Cardinals lead in National League pennants with 19 against the Cubs' 17. The Cubs have won 11 of those pennants in Major League Baseball's Modern Era (1901–present), while all 19 of the Cardinals' pennants have been won since 1926. The Cardinals also have an edge when it comes to World Series successes, having won 11 championships to the Cubs' 3. Games featuring the Cardinals and Cubs see numerous visiting fans in either Busch Stadium in St. Louis or Wrigley Field in Chicago. When the National League split into two and then three divisions, the Cardinals and Cubs remained together. This has added excitement to several pennant races over the years. The Cardinals and Cubs have played each other once in the postseason–in 2015–which the Cubs won 3–1.

=== Kansas City Royals ===
The Cardinals have an interleague and intrastate rivalry with the Kansas City Royals, dubbed the "Show-Me Series" after the nickname of the team's home state, Missouri; or the "I–70 Series" after the interstate highway that connects the cities. The teams first met in the 1985 World Series, which the Royals won 4–3, and which remains their only post-season meeting.

Since interleague play began in 1997, the Cardinals and Royals have met in four to six games each season, evenly split between the two cities. Through the 2026 season, the Cardinals lead the overall series 85-62.

The rivalry heated up in 2015, when both teams held the best records in their respective leagues when they opened each of their two series. The Royals advanced to the World Series, where they faced and ultimately defeated the New York Mets, while the Cardinals lost in the NLDS. Had the Cardinals made it to the World Series, they would have faced the Royals in a rematch of 1985.

=== Los Angeles Dodgers ===
Primarily a playoff rivalry; since 1892, the Cardinals and Dodgers have met six times in the postseason, with two meetings in the NLCS, both won by the Cardinals. Both teams have recently grown a history of animosity towards one another since the late 2000s as both teams often met frequently in the postseason. The Dodgers have not fared as well against the Cardinals in the postseason. In five prior postseason series matchups, the Cardinals have won four, with the Dodgers winning only the 2009 NLDS and the 2021 National League Wild Card Game.

=== New York Mets ===
The rivalry between the Cardinals and the New York Mets peaked during the 1980s when both teams contended for National League East supremacy. The rivalry began with the 1983 trade that brought Keith Hernandez from the Cardinals to the Mets, essentially turning the latter into contenders. Between 1985 and 1988, the division was dominated by either of the two teams, and in three of those years, the NL East winner went on to the World Series. In 1994, the Cardinals were moved to the National League Central, and the rivalry faded soon after. The two teams would meet in the NLCS in 2000 and 2006, briefly rekindling the rivalry.

== Executives and club officials ==
=== Ownership and valuation ===
An investment group led by William DeWitt Jr. owns the St. Louis Cardinals, having bought the team from Anheuser-Busch (AB) in 1996. As with other periods of the Cardinals' transaction history, doubt loomed as to whether the purchaser would keep the team in St. Louis, due to the city's status as a "small market", which appears to handicap a club's competitiveness. Such was the case when Sam Breadon put the Cardinals up for sale in 1947: then-NL President Ford Frick proposed moving the Cardinals to Chicago. When AB placed the Cardinals for sale in 1995, they publicly expressed intention to find a buyer who would keep the club in St. Louis. In March 1996, AB sold the team for $147 million to a partnership headed by Southwest Bank's Drew Baur, Hanser and DeWitt Jr. Civic Center Redevelopment, a subsidiary of AB, held the parking garages and adjacent property and also transferred them to the Baur ownership group. Baur's group then sold the garages to another investment group, lowering the net franchise purchase price to about $100 million, about $10 million less than Financial World's value of the team at the time $110 million.

Current Cincinnati Reds owners Bob Castellini and brothers Thomas Williams and W. Joseph Williams Jr. each once owned a stake in the Cardinals dating back to the Baur-DeWitt group's purchase of the team. To allow their purchase of the Reds in 2005, the rest of the group bought out Castellini's and the Williams brothers' shares, totaling an estimated 13 percent. At that time, the Forbes valued the Cardinals at about $370 million. However, after reabsorbing that stake into the remainder of the group, they decided to make it available to new investors in 2010. Amid later allegations that the Cardinals owed the city profit shares, DeWitt revealed that their profitability had not reached the threshold to trigger that obligation.

Bill DeWitt Jr. announced on June 24, 2026, that his son, Bill DeWitt III, would become the Cardinals' chief executive officer, overseeing baseball and business operations. DeWitt Jr. said he would remain chairman and principal owner.

==== Recent annual financial records ====
As of 2024, Forbes valued the Cardinals tenth among the 30 MLB franchises. Their estimated value of $2.55 billion was the same from the season before, when they ranked tenth. St. Louis' revenue in 2024 was $372 million, up $14 million from 2023. Their Operating income was $57 million. The Cardinals' deal with Fox Sports Midwest (now FanDuel Sports Network Midwest), signed in 2015, began in 2018, and is worth $1 billion through 2032. In 2014, Forbes valued the Cardinals at $820 million and opined previously that they play "in the best single-team baseball market in the country and are among the league's leaders in television ratings and attendance every season." Concurrent with the growth of Major League Baseball, the Cardinals value has increased significantly since the Baur-DeWitt purchase. In 2000, the franchise was valued at $219 million, a growth rate of 374% through 2014. The franchise's value grew 12.7% from 2013 to 2014. The Forbes methodology of team values are enterprise values (equity plus net debt) that include the economics of the ballpark but exclude the value of real estate itself. Forbes does not include the value of team-owned regional sports networks. The league's ownership in Major League Baseball Advanced Media (100%) and the MLB Network (67%) and league's investment portfolio are included in our values. In total, these three assets constitute about $425 million in value for each team. Revenue and operating income (earnings before interest, taxes, depreciation and amortization) measure cash in versus cash out (not accrual accounting) for the 2017 season. Their figures include the post-season and are net of revenue sharing and stadium debt payments. Revenues include the pro-rated upfront bonuses networks pay teams as well as proceeds from non-MLB events at the ballpark. The non-recurring $18 million each team received in 2017 from the sale of a stake in BamTech to Walt Disney was excluded, as were profits or losses from team-owned RSNs.

**St. Louis Cardinals' financial value since 2009**
**Year**	$ Value (mil.)^{1}	$ Revenue (mil.) ^{2}	$ Operating Income (mil.) ^{3}	$ Player Expenses (mil.) ^{4}	**Win-to-Player Cost Ratio** ^{5}	**Ref**
2009	$486	$195	$ 7	$120	87
2010	$488	$195	$12.8	$111	100
2011	$518	$207	$19.8	$110	94
2012	$591	$233	$25.0	$123	116
2013	$716	$239	$19.9	$134	102
2014	$820	$283	$65.2	$133	118
2015	$1,400	$294	$73.6	$133	111
2016	$1,600	$300	$59.8	$145	115
2017	$1,800	$310	$41	$173	86
2018	$1,900	$319	$40	$165	89
2019	$2,100	$356	$65	$176	90
2020	$2,200	$383	$72	$182	95
2021	$2,200	$109	-$79	$88	76
2022	$2,500	$287	-$34	$191	78
2023	$2,600	$358	$43	$174	100
2024	$2,600	$372	$57	$169	85
2025	$2,600	$373	$ 6.7	$219	92

All valuations per Forbes.
^{1} Based on current stadium deal (unless new stadium is pending) without deduction for debt, other than stadium debt.

(2024: market $1,070 mil., stadium $540 mil., sport $590 mil., brand management $350 mil.)
(2018: market $715 mil., stadium $447 mil., sport $493 mil., brand management $245 mil.)
(2017: market $666 mil., stadium $411 mil., sport $488 mil., brand management $235 mil.)
(2016: market $613 mil., stadium $378 mil., sport $406 mil., brand management $219 mil.)
(2015: market $548 mil., stadium $338 mil., sport $331 mil., brand management $197 mil.)
(2014: market $339 mil., stadium $211 mil., sport $156 mil., brand management $124 mil.)
(2013: market $291 mil., stadium $182 mil., sport $151 mil., brand management $91 mil.)
(2012: market $240 mil., stadium $157 mil., sport $119 mil., brand management $78 mil.)
(2011: market $206 mil., stadium $136 mil., sport $111 mil., brand management $65 mil.)

^{2} Net of stadium revenues used for debt payments.
^{3} Earnings before interest, taxes, depreciation and amortization.
^{4} Includes benefits and bonuses.
^{5} Compares the number of wins per player payroll relative to the rest of MLB. Playoff wins count twice as much as regular season wins. A score of 120 means that the team achieved 20% more victories per dollar of payroll compared with the league average in 2010.

=== Other interests ===
The Cardinals own three of their six Minor League Baseball affiliates:

- Palm Beach Cardinals, Florida State League
- Florida Complex League Cardinals, Florida Complex League
- Dominican Summer League Cardinals, Dominican Summer League

=== Executives ===
Executive officers

- Chairman and principal owner: William DeWitt Jr.
- Chief executive officer: Bill DeWitt III
- President of baseball operations: Chaim Bloom
- President of business operations: Anuk Karunaratne
- Senior vice president & general counsel: Mike Whittle
- Vice president, business development: Dan Good

Baseball operations

- General manager: Rob Cerfolio
- Vice president and senior advisor: Mike Girsch
- Assistant general manager: Moisés Rodríguez
- Special assistant to president of baseball operations: Willie McGee
- Special assistant to president of baseball operations: Yadier Molina

=== Managers ===
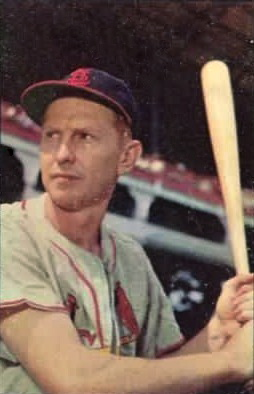
Red Schoendienst (1965–76, 1980, 1990)

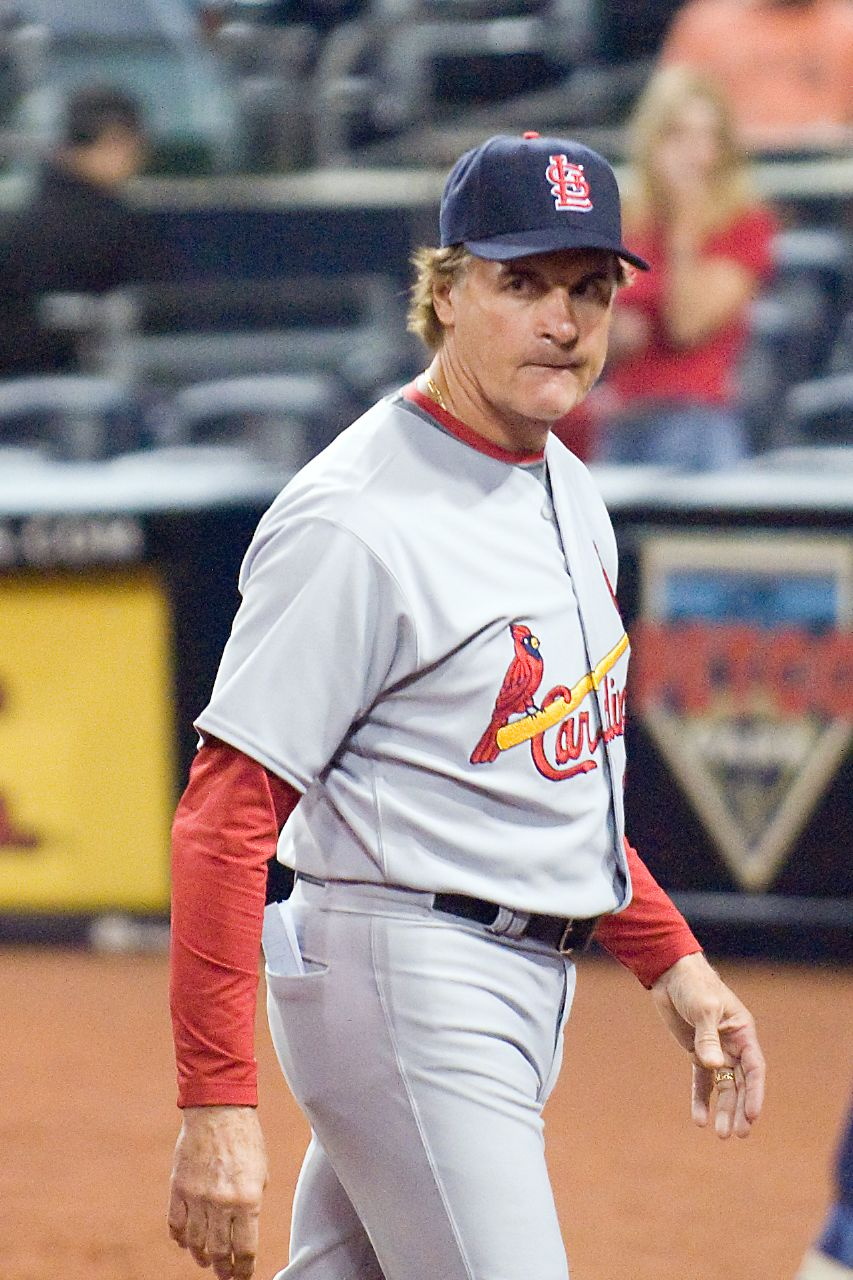
Tony La Russa (1996–2011)

Managers with one or more years managing, and the current manager are included here.

Dates	Name	W-L Record	%	Highlights	Ref
1883–89, 1891	Charles Comiskey†	563–273	**.673***	Highest winning-percentage in franchise history; **Four consecutive World Series appearances**, one title	
1895, 96, 97	Chris von der Ahe	3–14	.176		
1901–03	Patsy Donovan	175–236	.426		
1904–05	Kid Nichols†	80–88	.476		
1906–08	John McCloskey	153–304	.335		
1909–12	Roger Bresnahan†	255–352	.420		
1913–17	Miller Huggins†	346–415	.455		
1918	Jack Hendricks	51–78	.395		
1919–25	Branch Rickey†	458–485	.486		
1925–26	Rogers Hornsby†	153–116	.569	One World Series win (player-manager)	
1927	Bob O'Farrell	92–61	.601		
1928–29	Bill McKechnie†	129–88	.594	One NL pennant	
1929, 1940–45	Billy Southworth†	620–346	**.642****	Second-highest winning-percentage in franchise history (highest modern); **Two World Series (1942, 1944) wins**	
1929, 1930–33	Gabby Street	312–242	.563	Two NL pennants and one World Series win	
1933–38	Frankie Frisch†	458–354	.564	One World Series win	
1939–40	Ray Blades	106–85	.555		
1946–50	Eddie Dyer	446–325	.578	One World Series win	
1951	Marty Marion	81–73	.526		
1952–55	Eddie Stanky	260–238	.522		
1956–58	Fred Hutchinson	232–220	.513		
1959–61	Solly Hemus	190–192	.497		
1961–64	Johnny Keane	317–249	.560	One World Series win	
1965–76, 1980, 1990	Red Schoendienst†	1041–955	.522	Two NL pennants and one World Series win	
1977–78	Vern Rapp	89–90	.497		
1978–80	Ken Boyer	166–190	.466		
1980–90	Whitey Herzog†	822–728	.530	Three NL pennants and one World Series win	
1990–95	Joe Torre†	351–354	.498		
1996–2011	Tony La Russa†	**1408*–1182***	.544	Most managerial wins and seasons (16) in team history; **Two World Series (2006, 2011) wins**	
2012–18	Mike Matheny	591–474	.555	One NL pennant	
2018–21	Mike Shildt	252–199	.559		
2022–present	Oliver Marmol	402–408	.496		

Table key

- *All-time franchise leader. ** Franchise leader since 1900.

**W-L**	Total number of wins and losses
**WPct**	Winning percentage: Number of wins divided by total of wins and losses
**Bold**	Franchise leader
†	Elected to the National Baseball Hall of Fame

== Players ==
=== Current roster ===
St. Louis Cardinals 2027 spring training roster
40-man roster		Non-roster invitees	Coaches / other
**Pitchers**: 47 Justin Bruihl; 40 Hunter Dobbins; 64 Ryan Fernandez; 35 Richard Fitts; 72 Luis Gastélum; 44 Gordon Graceffo; 56 Cooper Hjerpe; 62 Kyle Leahy; 32 Matthew Liberatore; 60 Quinn Mathews; 52 Brycen Mautz; 36 Michael McGreevy; 61 Riley O'Brien; -- Jacob Odle; 53 Andre Pallante; 66 Hancel Rincon; -- Eduardo Rivera; 38 Tekoah Roby; 65 George Soriano; 49 Matt Svanson; 63 Cade Winquest	**Catchers**: 13 Leo Bernal; 8 Jimmy Crooks; 43 Pedro Pagés; **Infielders**: -- Jesús Báez; 41 Alec Burleson; 33 Blaze Jordan; 31 César Prieto; 25 Thomas Saggese; 26 JJ Wetherholt; 0 Masyn Winn; **Outfielders**: 22 Joshua Báez; 27 Nathan Church; 15 José Fermín; 21 Everson Pereira; 11 Victor Scott II; 39 Bryan Torres; 18 Jordan Walker; **Designated hitters**: 48 Iván Herrera	**Pitchers**: -- Josh Fleming	**Manager**: 37 Oliver Marmol; **Coaches**: 87 Brandon Allen (assistant hitting); 90 Dusty Blake (pitching); 88 Casey Chenoweth (assistant hitting); 82 Stubby Clapp (first base); 34 Daniel Descalso (bench); 86 Kyle Driscoll (assistant pitching); 19 Jon Jay (outfield/baserunning/quality control); -- Joel McKeithan (hitting); 94 Jamie Pogue (assistant/bullpen); 74 Julio Rangel (assistant pitching/bullpen); 76 Kleininger Teran (bullpen catcher); 75 Ron 'Pop' Warner (third base); 39 active, 0 inactive, 1 non-roster invitees; 7-, 10-, or 15-day injured list; * Not on active roster; ^{†} Suspended list; Roster, coaches, and NRIs updated November 20, 2026; Transactions • Depth chart; → All MLB rosters

=== Selected individual achievements and awards ===
- MVP Awards: Seventeen different Cardinals players have won a total of 21 Most Valuable Player Awards, the most recent being Paul Goldschmidt in 2022. Stan Musial and Albert Pujols have won the most MVP Awards, with three each. Bob Gibson won both the Cy Young Award and the MVP Award in 1968. The Cardinals rank second only to the New York Yankees (25 MVP Awards).
- Cy Young Awards: Two Cardinals pitchers have won Cy Young Awards: Bob Gibson (1968 and 1970), and Chris Carpenter (2005).
- Rookie of the Year: Six Cardinals players have won the Rookie of the Year Award:
  - Wally Moon (1954)
  - Bill Virdon (1955)
  - Bake McBride (1974)
  - Vince Coleman (1985)
  - Todd Worrell (1986)
  - Albert Pujols (2001)
- Triple Crown: Four of the 16 batting Triple Crowns in Major League Baseball history have been won by Cardinals players, including three of the six in the National League. Tip O'Neill won the only American Association Triple Crown and the first in franchise history in 1887. Rogers Hornsby became the only two-time winner in National League history when he won it in 1922 and 1925 (Ted Williams won two American League Triple Crowns). Joe Medwick's Triple Crown in 1937 is the last in National League history. Hornsby's 1925 statistics led the major leagues, making him one of only five players to have won this expanded version of the Triple Crown.

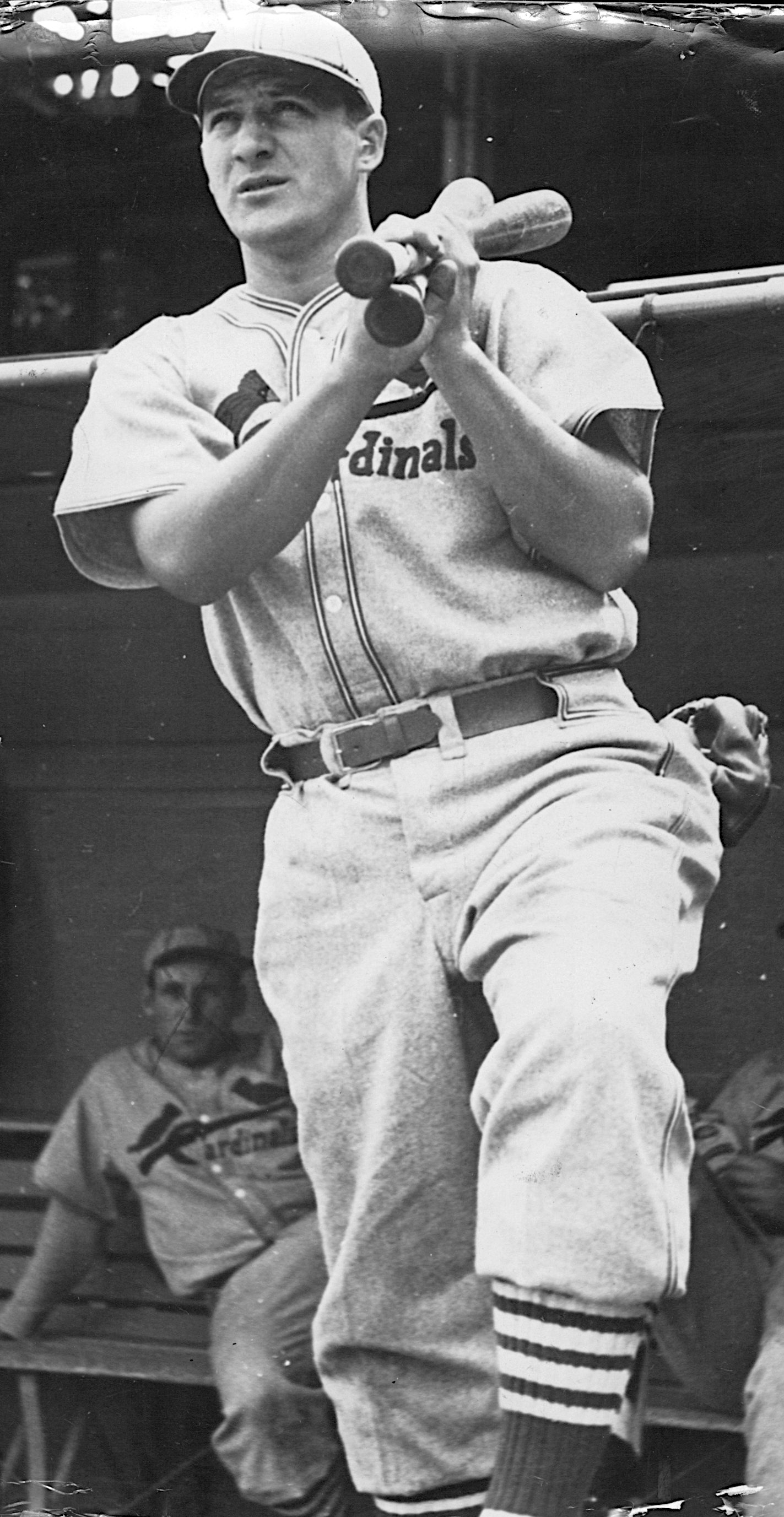
Joe Medwick won the last National League Triple Crown in 1937.

- No-hitters: Cardinals pitchers have thrown 10 no-hitters:
  - Ted Breitenstein (1891)
  - Jesse Haines (1924)
  - Paul Dean (1934)
  - Lon Warneke (1941)
  - Ray Washburn (1968)
  - Bob Gibson (1971)
  - Bob Forsch (1978 and 1983)
  - José Jiménez (1999)
  - Bud Smith (2001)

The Cardinals were last no-hit by Johan Santana of the New York Mets in 2012. The Cardinals have never participated in a perfect game, either as the winning or losing team.

- Hitting for the cycle: 19 different Cardinals players have hit for the cycle for a total of 21 times, the most recent being Nolan Arenado in 2022.
- Home runs and RBIs in a game: Jim Bottomley drove in 12 runs against the Brooklyn Robins on September 16, 1924, an all-time MLB single-game record that still stands. On September 7, 1993, Mark Whiten tied that record and another MLB single-game record with four home runs.
- Two grand slams in a single inning: Fernando Tatís is the only player in MLB history to hit two grand slams in the same inning. Both were against Chan Ho Park of the Dodgers on April 23, 1999.
- Four home runs in a row by consecutive batters: Nolan Arenado, Nolan Gorman, Juan Yepez, and Dylan Carlson hit consecutive home runs against Kyle Gibson of the Phillies on July 2, 2022. This feat has only occurred 11 times in MLB history.
- Three home runs by a single player in his MLB debut: Joshua Báez is the only player in MLB history to hit three home runs in his MLB debut, first three MLB at bats, and first three MLB plate appearances. All were against Matthew Boyd of the Cubs on August 15, 2026.

=== Team captains ===
- Leo Durocher (1934–1937)
- Terry Moore (1942–1948)
- Ken Boyer (1959–1965)
- Ted Simmons and Reggie Smith (1976)

=== Hall of Famers ===
==== National Baseball Hall of Fame and Museum ====
St. Louis Cardinals Hall of Famers
Affiliation according to the National Baseball Hall of Fame and Museum
St. Louis Browns

Charles Comiskey

Roger Connor

Pud Galvin

Clark Griffith

Tommy McCarthy

St. Louis Cardinals

Grover Cleveland Alexander
Dick Allen
Walter Alston
Jake Beckley
Carlos Beltrán
Jim Bottomley*
Roger Bresnahan
**Lou Brock***
Mordecai Brown
Jesse Burkett

Steve Carlton
Orlando Cepeda
**Dizzy Dean***
Leo Durocher
Dennis Eckersley
Frankie Frisch*
**Bob Gibson***
Burleigh Grimes
Chick Hafey*
Jesse Haines*

**Whitey Herzog***
Rogers Hornsby*
Miller Huggins
Jim Kaat
Tony La Russa*
Rabbit Maranville
John McGraw
Bill McKechnie
Joe Medwick*
Minnie Miñoso
Johnny Mize*

**Stan Musial***
Kid Nichols
Branch Rickey
Wilbert Robinson
**Scott Rolen**
**Red Schoendienst***
**Ted Simmons***
**Enos Slaughter***
Lee Smith
**Ozzie Smith***

John Smoltz
**Billy Southworth***
**Bruce Sutter**
Joe Torre
Dazzy Vance
Larry Walker
Bobby Wallace
Hoyt Wilhelm
Vic Willis
Cy Young

- Players and managers listed in **bold** are depicted on their Hall of Fame plaques wearing a Browns or Cardinals cap insignia.
- * St. Louis Cardinals / Browns listed as primary team according to the Hall of Fame

==== St. Louis Cardinals Hall of Fame and Museum ====
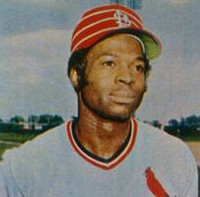
Lou Brock

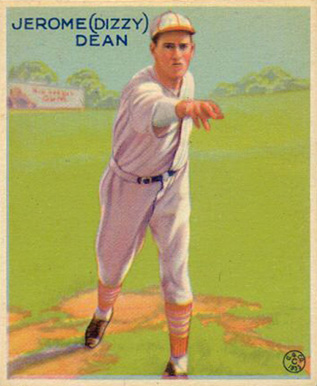
Dizzy Dean

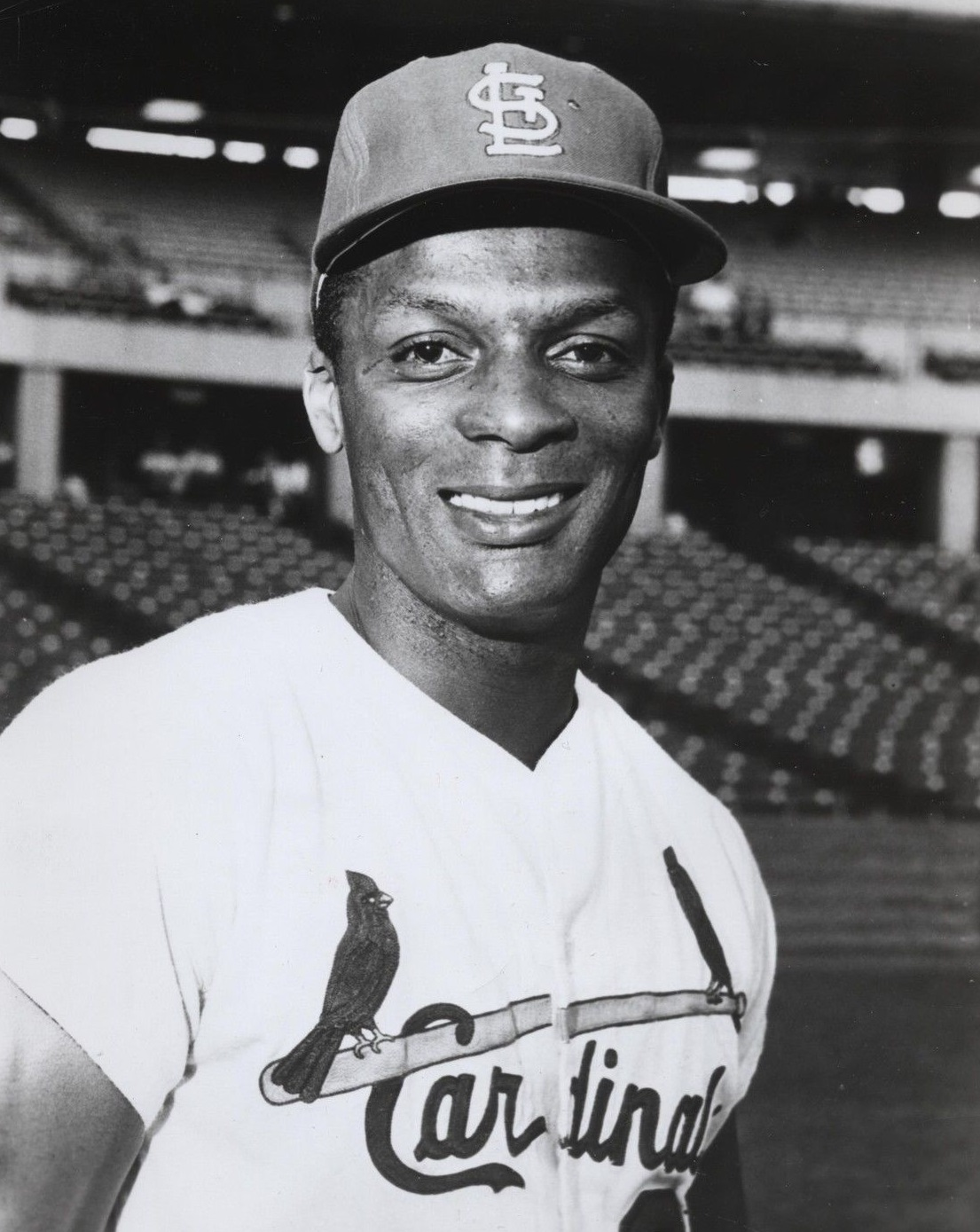
Curt Flood

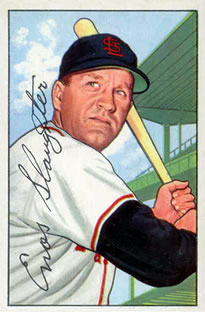
Enos Slaughter

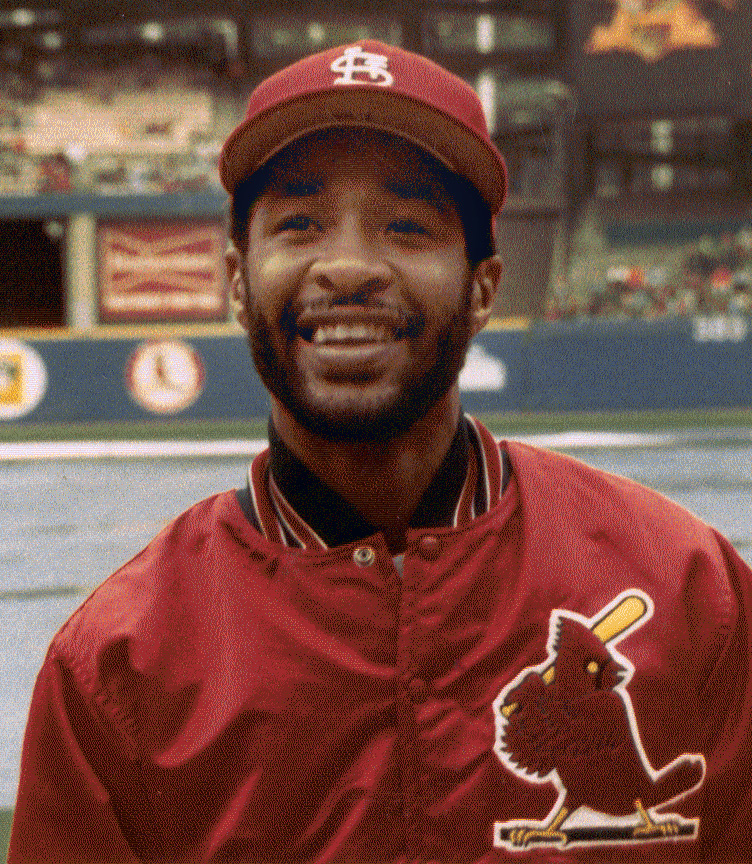
Ozzie Smith

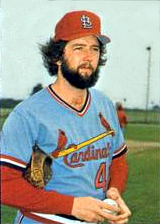
Bruce Sutter

In 2014, the Cardinals announced the reopening of the franchise Hall of Fame after a 6-year hiatus. A formal selection process recognizes former players as Cardinals Hall of Famers each year. To be eligible for election, a player must have been a member of the Cardinals for at least three seasons. The team initially released the names of 22 former players and personnel included in the inaugural class of 2014. As of 2026,the Cardinals Hall of Fame has 61 members.

Key
**Bold**	Member of the Baseball Hall of Fame
†	Member of the Baseball Hall of Fame as a Cardinal
**Bold**	Recipient of the Hall of Fame's Ford C. Frick Award

Positions that are listed were played the equivalent of a full season for the Cardinals.

No.	Name	Years with Cardinals franchise	Position(s)	Year elected	Committee selection
4	**Jim Bottomley**^{†}	1922–1932, 1939, 1955	1B, Broadcaster, Scout	2014	Inaugural
14	**Ken Boyer**	1955–1965, 1971–1972, 1978–1980	3B, Manager, Coach	2014	Inaugural
—	**Sam Breadon**	1917–1947	Owner	2016	Team
31	**Harry Brecheen**	1940, 1943–1952	P	2018	Red Ribbon
20	**Lou Brock**^{†}	1964–1979	LF	2014	Inaugural
—	**Jack Buck**	1954–1959, 1961–2001	Broadcaster	2014	Inaugural
85	**Gussie Busch**	1953–1989	Owner	2014	Inaugural
29	**Chris Carpenter**	2004–2012	P	2016	Fan
29	**Vince Coleman**	1985–1990	LF	2018	Fan
—	**Charles Comiskey**	1882–1889, 1891	1B, Manager	2022	Team
13, 14, 24, 25, 30	**Mort Cooper**	1938–1945	P	2019	Red Ribbon
17	**Dizzy Dean**^{†}	1930, 1932–1937, 1941–1946	P, Broadcaster	2014	Inaugural
18	**Dave Duncan**	1996–2011	Coach	2024	Team
15	**Jim Edmonds**	2000–2007, 2016–2024	CF, Broadcaster	2014	Fan
21, 42	**Curt Flood**	1958–1969	CF	2015	Red Ribbon
31, 37	**Bob Forsch**	1974–1988	P	2015	Fan
3	**Frankie Frisch**^{†}	1927–1938	2B, Manager	2014	Inaugural
31, 45, 58	**Bob Gibson**^{†}	1959–1975, 1995	P, Coach	2014	Inaugural
—	**Chick Hafey**^{†}	1924–1931	OF	2014	Inaugural
16	**Jesse Haines**^{†}	1920–1937	P	2014	Inaugural
18, 37	**Keith Hernandez**	1974–1983	1B	2021	Fan
28	**Tom Herr**	1979–1988	2B	2020	Fan
24	**Whitey Herzog**^{†}	1980–1990	Manager, General Manager	2014	Inaugural
7, 15	**Matt Holliday**	2009–2016	LF	2022	Fan
4	**Rogers Hornsby**^{†}	1915–1926, 1933	2B, SS, Manager	2014	Inaugural
39	**Al Hrabosky**	1970–1977, 1985–present	P, Broadcaster	2025	Red Ribbon
44	**Jason Isringhausen**	2002–2008	P	2019	Fan
25	**Julián Javier**	1960–1971	2B	2022	Red Ribbon
—	**Walt Jocketty**	1994–2007	General Manager	2025	Team
3	**George Kissell**	1940–1942, 1946–2008	Coach, Instructor, Scout	2015	Team
1, 5	**Whitey Kurowski**	1941–1949	3B	2024	Red Ribbon
10	**Tony La Russa**^{†}	1996–2011	Manager	2014	Inaugural
21, 23, 30, 32, 40	**Max Lanier**	1938–1946, 1949–1951	P	2023	Red Ribbon
12, 16	**Ray Lankford**	1990–2001, 2004	CF	2018	Fan
4	**Marty Marion**	1940–1951	SS, Manager, Coach	2014	Red Ribbon
1, 2, 10, 11, 28	**Pepper Martin**	1928, 1930–1940, 1944	OF, 3B	2017	Red Ribbon
9, 15, 20, 51	**Tim McCarver**	1959–1969, 1973–1974, 2014–2019	C, Broadcaster	2017	Fan
51	**Willie McGee**	1982–1990, 1996–1999, 2018–present	OF, Coach, Advisor	2014	Fan
25	**Mark McGwire**	1997–2001, 2010–2012	1B, Coach	2017	Fan
7, 12, 21, 28	**Joe Medwick**^{†}	1932–1940, 1947–1948	LF	2014	Inaugural
10	**Johnny Mize**^{†}	1936–1941	1B	2014	Inaugural
4, 41	**Yadier Molina**	2004–2022, 2024–present	C, Advisor	2026	Fan
2, 8, 11	**Terry Moore**	1935–1942, 1946–1952, 1956–1958	CF, Coach	2016	Red Ribbon
35	**Matt Morris**	1997–2005	P	2024	Fan
6	**Stan Musial**^{†}	1941–1944, 1946–1963, 1967	OF, 1B, General Manager	2014	Inaugural
5, 11, 91	**José Oquendo**	1986–1995, 1997–present	2B, Coach	2023	Team
5	**Albert Pujols**	2001–2011, 2022	1B, LF	2026	Fan
3	**Édgar Rentería**	1999–2004	SS	2025	Fan
—	**Branch Rickey**	1919–1942	Manager, General Manager, President	2014	Inaugural
16, 27	**Scott Rolen**	2002–2007	3B	2019	Fan
2, 6	**Red Schoendienst**^{†}	1945–1956, 1961–1976, 1979–1995	2B, Manager, Coach	2014	Inaugural
18, 28	**Mike Shannon**	1962–1970, 1972–2021	3B, RF, Broadcaster	2014	Team
25	**Bill Sherdel**	1918–1930, 1932	P	2026	Red Ribbon
23	**Ted Simmons**^{†}	1968–1980	C	2015	Fan
9	**Enos Slaughter**^{†}	1938–1942, 1946–1953	RF	2014	Inaugural
1	**Ozzie Smith**^{†}	1982–1999	SS, Broadcaster	2014	Inaugural
30, 40	**Billy Southworth**^{†}	1926–1927, 1929, 1940–1945	RF, Manager	2014	Inaugural
42	**Bruce Sutter**	1981–1984	P	2014	Inaugural
9, 22	**Joe Torre**	1969–1974, 1990–1995	3B, 1B, Manager	2016	Fan
30, 48	**John Tudor**	1985–1988, 1990	P	2020	Fan
7, 12, 26	**Bill White**	1959–1965, 1969	1B	2020	Red Ribbon

Players who have been nominated, but not inducted, include Joaquín Andújar, Steve Carlton, George Hendrick, Brian Jordan, and Lee Smith.

After receiving the most fan votes on the 2023 ballot, David Freese later declined his induction into the Cardinals Hall of Fame.

==== Inducted into the Missouri Sports Hall of Fame ====
**St. Louis Cardinals in the Missouri Sports Hall of Fame**
No.	Name	Years with Cardinals franchise	Position(s)	Year elected	Notes
—	Lou Adamie	1941–1982	Scorekeeper	2007	
—	Jack Buck	1954–1959, 1961–2001	Broadcaster	1980	
—	Bing Devine	1957–1964, 1967–1978	GM	1996	Born and raised in St. Louis
—	Charlie Grimm	1918	1B	1966	Born in St. Louis
—	Walt Jocketty	1994–2007	GM	2007	
—	Mark Lamping	1994–2008	President	2021	Attended Rockhurst University in Kansas City, Missouri
—	Branch Rickey	1919–1942	Manager, GM, President	1965	
0, 13	Kerry Robinson	2001–2003	OF	2024	Born and raised in St. Louis, attended Southeast Missouri State University in Cape Girardeau, Missouri
1	Ozzie Smith	1982–1999	SS, Broadcaster	1997	
2, 6	Red Schoendienst	1945–1956, 1961–1976, 1979–1995	2B, LF, Manager, Coach	1987	
2, 8, 11	Terry Moore	1935–1942, 1946–1952, 1956–1958	CF, Coach	1992	
3	Frankie Frisch	1927–1938	2B, 3B, Manager	1972	
3	George Kissell	1940–1942, 1946–2008	Coach, Instructor, Scout	2003	
4, 6	Rogers Hornsby	1915–1926, 1933	2B, SS, 3B, Manager	1972	
4	Marty Marion	1940–1951	SS, Manager, Coach	1992	
5, 22	Don Gutteridge	1936–1940	2B, 3B, SS	2001	
6	Stan Musial	1941–1944, 1946–1963, 1967	OF, 1B, GM	1963	
7, 12, 21, 28	Joe Medwick	1932–1940, 1947–1948	LF	2019	
7, 15	Matt Holliday	2009–2016	LF	2022	
8	Hal McRae	2005–2009	Coach	2004	Elected mainly on his performance with the Kansas City Royals
8, 14	Mickey Owen	1937–1940	C	2012	Born and raised in Nixa, Missouri
9	Roger Maris	1967–1968	RF	2013	
9	Terry Pendleton	1984–1990	3B	2020	
9	Enos Slaughter	1938–1942, 1946–1953	RF	1999	
9	Bill Virdon	1955–1956	CF	1983	Grew up in West Plains, Missouri, attended Drury University in Springfield, Missouri
9, 15, 20, 51	Tim McCarver	1959–1969, 1973–1974, 2014–2019	C, 1B, Broadcaster	2004	
10	Tony La Russa	1996–2011	Manager	2006	
14	Ken Boyer	1955–1965, 1971–1972, 1978–1980	3B, CF, Manager, Coach	1992	Born in Liberty, Missouri, grew up in Alba, Missouri
15	Jim Edmonds	2000–2007, 2016–2024	CF, Broadcaster	2012	
15	Darrell Porter	1981–1985	C	2000	Born in Joplin, Missouri
15, 28	Joe Cunningham	1954, 1956–1961	1B, RF	2012	
16	Jamie Quirk	1983	C, 3B	2012	Elected mainly on his performance with the Kansas City Royals
17	Dizzy Dean	1930, 1932–1937, 1941–1946	P, Broadcaster	1970	
17	Joe Garagiola	1946–1951, 1955–1962	C, Broadcaster	1970	
18	Dave Duncan	1996–2011	Coach	2014	
18	Andy Van Slyke	1983–1986	CF, 1B, 3B	2021	
18, 28	Mike Shannon	1962–1970, 1972–2021	3B, RF, Broadcaster	1999	
18, 37	Keith Hernandez	1974–1983	1B	2008	
19	Tom Pagnozzi	1987–1998	C, 1B	2010	
19	Preacher Roe	1938	P	1998	
20	Lou Brock	1964–1979	LF	1998	
21, 42	Curt Flood	1958–1969	CF	2013	
22	David Eckstein	2005–2007	SS, 2B	2013	
22, 44	Mike Matheny	2000–2004, 2012–2018	C, Manager	2011	
23	Bernard Gilkey	1990–1995	LF	2018	
23	Charlie James	1960–1964	OF	2015	Born in St. Louis, attended the University of Missouri in Columbia, Missouri
23	Ted Simmons	1968–1980	C, 1B	2005	
24	Dick Groat	1963–1965	SS	2012	
24	Whitey Herzog	1980–1990	Manager, GM	1994	
24, 49, 66	Rick Ankiel	1999–2001, 2004, 2007–2009	CF, P	2018	
25	Gabby Street	1929–1933	C, Manager	1966	
28	Tom Herr	1979–1988	2B	2011	
28, 30	Orlando Cepeda	1966–1968	1B, LF	2000	
28, 40	Dan Quisenberry	1988–1989	P	1997	Elected mainly on his performance with the Kansas City Royals
29	Chris Carpenter	2004–2012	P	2013	
29	Vince Coleman	1985–1990	LF	2017	
31, 37	Bob Forsch	1974–1988	P	2002	
31, 40, 41	Alan Benes	1995–2001	P	2020	
31, 45, 58	Bob Gibson	1959–1975, 1995	P, Coach	1996	
32, 34	Mark Littell	1978–1982	P	2016	
33, 44, 47	Ken Reitz	1972–1975, 1977–1980	3B	2009	
34	Danny Cox	1983–1988	P	2022	
34, 51	Darold Knowles	1979–1980	P	2012	Born and raised in Brunswick, Missouri, attended the University of Missouri in Columbia, Missouri
37	Dennis Higgins	1971–1972	P	2013	
37	Jeff Suppan	2004–2006, 2010	P	2019	
38	Todd Worrell	1985–1989, 1992	P	2009	
39	Al Hrabosky	1970–1977	P	2003	
40	Andy Benes	1996–1997, 2000–2002	P	2020	
40	Rick Sutcliffe	1994	P	2004	Born and raised in Independence, Missouri
42	Bruce Sutter	1981–1984	P	2007	
44	Jason Isringhausen	2002–2008	P	2016	
47	Lee Smith	1990–1993	P	2018	
49	Ricky Horton	1984–1987, 1989–1990	P	2014	
49	Jerry Reuss	1969–1971	P	2016	Born in St. Louis, grew up in Overland, Missouri
50	Tom Henke	1995	P	2000	Born and raised in Kansas City, Missouri
50	Lee Thomas	1970–1988	Coach, Instructor	2008	
50, 60	Adam Wainwright	2005–2010, 2012–2023	P	2023	
51	Willie McGee	1982–1990, 1996–1999, 2018–present	OF, Coach, Advisor	2014	
85	Gussie Busch	1953–1989	Owner	1975	Born and raised in St. Louis

=== Retired numbers ===
The Cardinals have retired 13 jersey numbers in honor of 15 former players and club personnel, the second-most in Major League Baseball behind the New York Yankees, who have retired 23 numbers, and a 16th number, Jackie Robinson's 42, is honored by all MLB teams. For the majority of Rogers Hornsby's career, the Cardinals did not have any numbers on their uniforms. When the Cardinals experimented with numbers on uniforms in 1923, Hornsby briefly donned the number 4. He switched to 6 the following season before the team abandoned the practice. Upon his return to the team in 1933, Hornsby again wore number 4 before being traded later that year. The club opted to simply honor his name with no number attached to him in 1997.

Rogers
Hornsby
2B, Mgr
Honored 1997
Ozzie
Smith
SS
Retired 1996
Red
Schoendienst
2B, Mgr, Coach
Retired 1996
Stan
Musial
OF, 1B, GM
Retired 1963
Enos
Slaughter
RF
Retired 1996
Tony
La Russa
Mgr
Retired 2012
Ken
Boyer
3B, Mgr, Coach
Retired 1984
Dizzy
Dean
SP
Retired 1974

Lou
Brock
LF, Coach
Retired 1979
Ted
Simmons
C
Retired 2021
Whitey
Herzog
Mgr, GM
Retired 2010
Bruce
Sutter
RP
Retired 2006
Bob
Gibson
SP, Coach
Retired 1975
Gussie
Busch
Owner
Retired 1984
Jackie
Robinson
2B
Retired by MLB 1997
Jack
Buck
Broadcaster
Honored 2002

Notes:

- Hornsby: When honored in 1997, '"SL"' was used in place of a number, as he played mostly in an era without numbers.
- 42: Jackie Robinson's number 42 was retired throughout baseball in 1997. The Cardinals again retired 42 in September 2006 in honor of Sutter, who was elected to the Hall of Fame earlier in the year.
- 85: Cardinals stockholders honored Busch with the number 85 on his 85th birthday in 1984.

==== Numbers out of circulation ====
- 4: Yadier Molina's (C, 2004–2022; Advisor, 2024–present) number has not been reissued since he retired after the 2022 season.
- 5: Albert Pujols's (1B, 2001–2011, 2022) number has not been reissued since he retired after the 2022 season.
- 28: Nolan Arenado's (3B, 2021–2025) number has not been reissued since he was traded to the Arizona Diamondbacks after the 2025 season.
- 46: Paul Goldschmidt's (1B, 2019–2024) number has not been reissued since he signed with the New York Yankees after the 2024 season.
- 50: Adam Wainwright's (SP, 2005–2010, 2012–2023) number has not been reissued since he retired after the 2023 season.
- 51: Willie McGee's (OF, 1982–1990, 1996–1999; Coach, 2018–2024; Advisor, 2025–present) number has not been reissued since late in the 2001 season, except for when he became a coach on the Cardinals' staff and was reissued the number.
- 69: The Cardinals have never issued the number 69 in either spring training or the regular season due to its sexual connotation. The only other number never worn in either setting is 85, which was honorarily retired before higher numbers became common.

== Cardinals records ==
Batting
Statistic	Player	Total	Ref.
Games played	Stan Musial	3,026	
Hits	Stan Musial	3,630	
Home runs	Stan Musial	475	
Runs batted in	Stan Musial	1,951	
Stolen bases	Lou Brock	888	
Batting average min. 1,500 plate appearances	Jesse Burkett	.378	

Pitching
Statistic	Player	Total	Ref.
Games	Jesse Haines	554	
Wins	Bob Gibson	251	
Saves	Jason Isringhausen	217	
Strikeouts	Bob Gibson	3,117	
Complete games	Bob Gibson	255	
Earned Run Average min. 500 innings	Ed Karger	2.46	

== Minor league affiliations ==
The St. Louis Cardinals farm system consists of six minor league affiliates.

Class	Team	League	Location	Ballpark	Affiliated
Triple-A	Memphis Redbirds	International League	Memphis, Tennessee	AutoZone Park	1998
Double-A	Ozarks Springbirds	Texas League	Springfield, Missouri	Route 66 Stadium	2005
High-A	Peoria Chiefs	Midwest League	Peoria, Illinois	Dozer Park	2013
Single-A	Palm Beach Cardinals	Florida State League	Jupiter, Florida	Roger Dean Stadium	2003
Rookie	FCL Cardinals	Florida Complex League	Jupiter, Florida	Roger Dean Stadium	2007
Rookie	DSL Cardinals	Dominican Summer League	Santo Domingo, Distrito Nacional	Las Américas Complex	2022

== Radio and television coverage ==
=== Radio ===
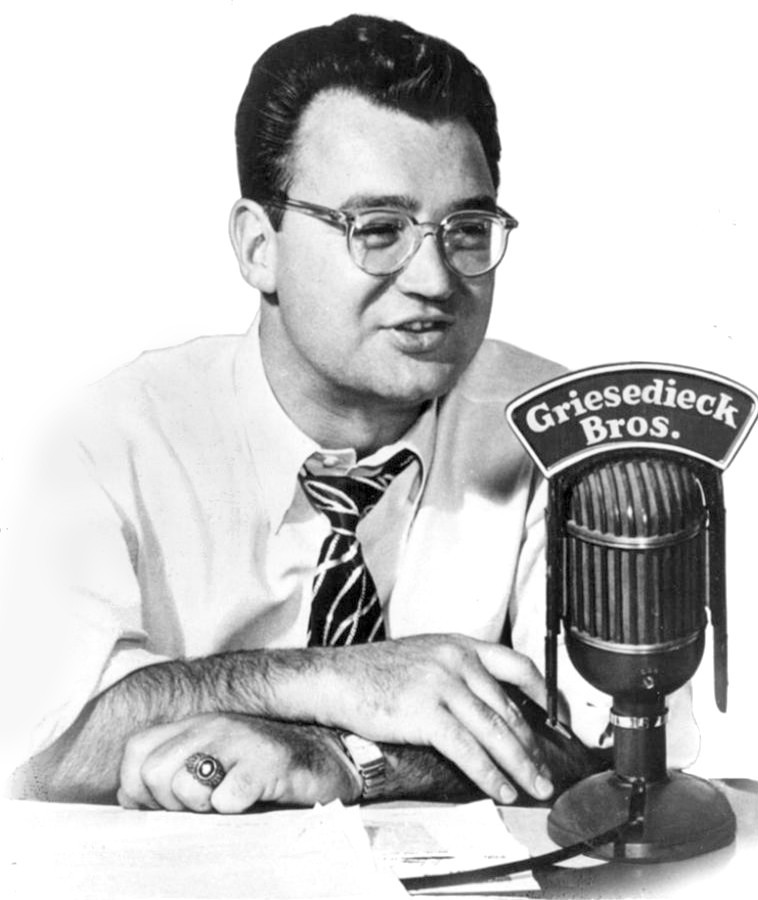
Harry Caray

In St. Louis, Audacy-owned KMOX (1120 AM) airs Cardinals games over radio and feeds the rest of the Cardinals network. It's the second largest radio network in Major League Baseball with over 145 radio stations in Arkansas, Illinois, Indiana, Iowa, Kentucky, Missouri, Oklahoma, and Tennessee that reach over 3 million unique listeners each season.

Ricky Horton and John Rooney alternate as play-by-play announcers, with Matt Pauley serving as pre-game and post-game host. KMOX's 50,000-watt clear-channel signal covers much of the Contiguous United States at night. At one time, owing to the Cardinals' status as a "regional" franchise, the Cardinals radio network reached almost half of the country.

The 2011 season marked the Cardinals' return to KMOX following five seasons on KTRS (550 AM), a station which is 50 percent owned by the Cardinals. With a partnership spanning seven decades, and continuously since 1954, its conclusion was realized after the 2005 season when the then owners of KMOX, CBS Radio, and the Cardinals failed to reach terms on a new rights agreement. However, frustrated by the underpowered coverage of 5,000-watt KTRS, the Cardinals reached a new deal with KMOX in 2011.

Starting in 2013 (at age 74), Mike Shannon started reducing his workload. As of the 2016 season, he only called home games for the Cardinals. As of the 2019 season, his 47th in the broadcast booth, he surpassed Jack Buck, his long-time broadcast companion, as the longest-tenured Cardinal broadcaster. On January 14, 2021, Shannon announced that the upcoming season, his 50th season in the broadcast booth, would be his last.

Starting with two games in 2016, Polo Ascencio became the first Spanish play-by-play broadcaster and Bengie Molina the first Spanish color analyst for the Cardinals' home games on WIJR.

=== Television ===
Since 2000, Cardinals telecasts have generated the top three in ratings in MLB every season. Beginning in 2026, Cardinals local games are produced by MLB Local Media under the Cardinals.TV branding, with MLB distributing its games on cable and satellite affiliates.

Until 2025, FanDuel Sports Network Midwest aired all games in high-definition and was the team's exclusive television broadcaster, with the exception of selected Friday Night Baseball on Apple TV+, Saturday afternoon games on Fox (via its St. Louis affiliate, KTVI) or Sunday Night Baseball on ESPN. FanDuel Sports Network Indiana, FanDuel Sports Network South, FanDuel Sports Network Oklahoma, FanDuel Sports Network Southwest, and FanDuel Sports Network Southeast air Cardinals games for fans living within the Cardinals broadcast territory who do not receive the FanDuel Sports Network Midwest channel. During the 2016 season, the Cardinals averaged an 8.54 rating and 104,000 viewers on primetime TV broadcasts in St Louis. Beginning with the 2025 season, at least 10 games are simulcast over-the-air on stations owned by Gray Media. Matrix Midwest is the flagship station for these games.

The television commentators lineup includes Chip Caray, Brad Thompson, and Mark Sweeney. Jim Hayes serves as dugout reporter during the game as well as on Cardinals Live, a pre- and post-game show. Cardinals Live is hosted in-studio by Alexa Datt along with game analysts and former Cardinals players Al Hrabosky and Rick Ankiel.

Cardinals Kids, a program aimed at the team's younger fans, airs weekly in-season on Fox Sports Midwest. It is hosted by former Cardinals pitcher Brad Thompson, team mascot Fredbird, and Busch Stadium Public Address announcer John "The U-Man" Ulett. The 30-minute show began airing in 2003 and presents team news, player profiles, and Cardinals team history in a kid-friendly manner along with games and trivia.

A weekly magazine program, This Week in Cardinal Nation, airs on St. Louis' NBC affiliate KSDK. Cardinals games had been seen on KSDK (and its predecessor, KSD-TV) from 1947 through 1958, 1963 through 1987, and 2007 until 2010. KPLR-TV was the Cardinals' other over-the-air broadcaster, carrying games from 1959 through 1962 and from 1988 until 2006.

Former Cardinals broadcasters include Jack Buck, Harry Caray, Bob Carpenter, Dizzy Dean, Jim Edmonds, Tim McCarver, Joe Garagiola, Dan McLaughlin, and Jay Randolph. Joe Buck, the son of Jack Buck, was an official member of the Cardinals' broadcast team from 1991 until 2007. The younger Buck once served as the lead play-by-play caller for Fox Sports' national Major League Baseball and National Football League broadcasts before joining ESPN as the voice of Monday Night Football in 2022.

== Opening Day lineups ==
Year	1	2	3	4	5	6	7	8	9	P
2026	JJ Wetherholt 2B	Iván Herrera DH	Alec Burleson 1B	Masyn Winn SS	Nolan Gorman 3B	Jordan Walker RF	Nathan Church LF	Pedro Pagés C	Victor Scott II CF	Matthew Liberatore P
2025	Lars Nootbaar LF	Willson Contreras 1B	Brendan Donovan 2B	Nolan Arenado 3B	Alec Burleson DH	Iván Herrera C	Jordan Walker RF	Victor Scott II CF	Masyn Winn SS	Sonny Gray P
2024	Brendan Donovan LF	Paul Goldschmidt 1B	Nolan Gorman 2B	Nolan Arenado 3B	Willson Contreras C	Alec Burleson DH	Jordan Walker RF	Victor Scott II CF	Masyn Winn SS	Miles Mikolas P
2023	Brendan Donovan 2B	Lars Nootbaar LF	Paul Goldschmidt 1B	Nolan Arenado 3B	Willson Contreras C	Tyler O'Neill CF	Nolan Gorman DH	Jordan Walker RF	Tommy Edman SS	Miles Mikolas P
2022	Dylan Carlson RF	Paul Goldschmidt 1B	Tyler O'Neill LF	Nolan Arenado 3B	Albert Pujols DH	Paul DeJong SS	Yadier Molina C	Harrison Bader CF	Tommy Edman 2B	Adam Wainwright P
2021	Tommy Edman 2B	Paul Goldschmidt 1B	Nolan Arenado 3B	Paul DeJong SS	Tyler O'Neill LF	Yadier Molina C	Dylan Carlson CF	Justin Williams RF	Jack Flaherty P	
2020	Kolten Wong 2B	Tommy Edman 3B	Paul Goldschmidt 1B	Paul DeJong SS	Matt Carpenter DH	Yadier Molina C	Dexter Fowler RF	Tyler O'Neill LF	Harrison Bader CF	Jack Flaherty P
2019	Matt Carpenter 3B	Paul Goldschmidt 1B	Paul DeJong SS	Marcell Ozuna LF	Yadier Molina C	Dexter Fowler RF	Kolten Wong 2B	Harrison Bader CF	Miles Mikolas P	
2018	Dexter Fowler RF	Tommy Pham CF	Matt Carpenter 3B	Marcell Ozuna LF	José Martínez 1B	Yadier Molina C	Paul DeJong SS	Kolten Wong 2B	Carlos Martínez P	
2017	Dexter Fowler CF	Aledmys Díaz SS	Matt Carpenter 1B	Jhonny Peralta 3B	Yadier Molina C	Stephen Piscotty RF	Jedd Gyorko 2B	Randal Grichuk LF	Carlos Martínez P	
2016	Matt Carpenter 3B	Tommy Pham LF	Matt Holliday 1B	Randal Grichuk CF	Stephen Piscotty RF	Yadier Molina C	Kolten Wong 2B	Jedd Gyorko SS	Adam Wainwright P	
2015	Matt Carpenter 3B	Jason Heyward RF	Matt Holliday LF	Jhonny Peralta SS	Matt Adams 1B	Yadier Molina C	Kolten Wong 2B	Jon Jay CF	Adam Wainwright P	
2014	Matt Carpenter 3B	Kolten Wong 2B	Matt Holliday LF	Allen Craig RF	Yadier Molina C	Matt Adams 1B	Jhonny Peralta SS	Peter Bourjos CF	Adam Wainwright P	
2013	Jon Jay CF	Matt Carpenter 2B	Matt Holliday LF	Allen Craig 1B	Carlos Beltrán RF	Yadier Molina C	Daniel Descalso 2B	Pete Kozma SS	Adam Wainwright P	
2012	Rafael Furcal SS	Carlos Beltrán RF	Matt Holliday LF	Lance Berkman 1B	David Freese 3B	Yadier Molina C	Jon Jay CF	Daniel Descalso 2B	Kyle Lohse P	
2011	Ryan Theriot SS	Colby Rasmus CF	Albert Pujols 1B	Matt Holliday LF	Lance Berkman RF	David Freese 3B	Yadier Molina C	Skip Schumaker 2B	Chris Carpenter P	
2010	Skip Schumaker 2B	Brendan Ryan SS	Albert Pujols 1B	Matt Holliday LF	Colby Rasmus CF	Ryan Ludwick RF	Yadier Molina C	David Freese 3B	Chris Carpenter P	
2009	Brendan Ryan 2B	Rick Ankiel CF	Albert Pujols 1B	Khalil Greene SS	Ryan Ludwick RF	Yadier Molina C	Chris Duncan LF	Brian Barden 3B	Adam Wainwright P	
2008	Skip Schumaker RF	Chris Duncan LF	Albert Pujols 1B	Rick Ankiel CF	Troy Glaus 3B	Yadier Molina C	Adam Kennedy 2B	Kyle Lohse P	César Izturis SS	
2007	David Eckstein SS	Preston Wilson RF	Albert Pujols 1B	Scott Rolen 3B	Yadier Molina C	Jim Edmonds CF	So Taguchi LF	Adam Kennedy 2B	Chris Carpenter P	
2006	David Eckstein SS	Juan Encarnación RF	Albert Pujols 1B	Jim Edmonds CF	Scott Rolen 3B	So Taguchi LF	Yadier Molina C	Aaron Miles 2B	Chris Carpenter P	
2005	David Eckstein SS	Larry Walker RF	Albert Pujols 1B	Scott Rolen 3B	Jim Edmonds CF	Mark Grudzielanek 2B	Reggie Sanders LF	Yadier Molina C	Chris Carpenter P	
2004	Tony Womack 2B	Ray Lankford LF	Albert Pujols 1B	Jim Edmonds CF	Scott Rolen 3B	Édgar Rentería SS	Reggie Sanders RF	Mike Matheny C	Matt Morris P	
2003	Fernando Viña 2B	Édgar Rentería SS	Jim Edmonds CF	Albert Pujols LF	Scott Rolen 3B	Tino Martinez 1B	Eli Marrero RF	Mike Matheny C	Matt Morris P	
2002	Fernando Viña 2B	Placido Polanco 3B	J. D. Drew RF	Albert Pujols LF	Jim Edmonds CF	Édgar Rentería SS	Tino Martinez 1B	Mike DiFelice C	Matt Morris P	
2001	Fernando Viña 2B	Édgar Rentería SS	Jim Edmonds CF	Mark McGwire 1B	Placido Polanco 3B	Albert Pujols LF	Mike Matheny C	J. D. Drew RF	Darryl Kile P	
2000	Fernando Viña 2B	Édgar Rentería SS	Ray Lankford LF	Fernando Tatís 3B	Jim Edmonds CF	Craig Paquette 1B	Eric Davis RF	Mike Matheny C	Darryl Kile P	
1999	Édgar Rentería SS	Jim Edmonds CF	Mark McGwire 1B	Eric Davis RF	Fernando Tatís 3B	Shawon Dunston LF	Eli Marrero C	Placido Polanco 2B	Donovan Osborne P	
1998	Royce Clayton SS	Delino DeShields 2B	Mark McGwire 1B	Ray Lankford CF	Brian Jordan RF	Ron Gant LF	Gary Gaetti 3B	Tom Lampkin C	Todd Stottlemyre P	
1997	Delino DeShields 2B	Royce Clayton SS	Willie McGee RF	Brian Jordan CF	Ron Gant LF	Gary Gaetti 3B	John Mabry 1B	Tom Lampkin C	Todd Stottlemyre P	
1996	Willie McGee RF	Royce Clayton SS	Ray Lankford CF	Ron Gant LF	Gary Gaetti 3B	John Mabry 1B	Pat Borders C	Luis Alicea 2B	Andy Benes P	
1995	Bernard Gilkey LF	Ozzie Smith SS	Ray Lankford CF	Scott Cooper 3B	Brian Jordan RF	John Mabry 1B	Tom Pagnozzi C	Manuel Lee 2B	Ken Hill P	
1994	Ray Lankford CF	Ozzie Smith SS	Gregg Jefferies 1B	Todd Zeile 3B	Mark Whiten RF	Bernard Gilkey LF	Luis Alicea 2B	Erik Pappas C	Bob Tewksbury P	
1993	Gerónimo Peña 2B	Ozzie Smith SS	Gregg Jefferies 1B	Ray Lankford CF	Mark Whiten RF	Todd Zeile 3B	Bernard Gilkey LF	Tom Pagnozzi C	Bob Tewksbury P	
1992	Ray Lankford CF	Ozzie Smith SS	Todd Zeile 3B	Andrés Galarraga 1B	Pedro Guerrero LF	Milt Thompson RF	Tom Pagnozzi C	José Oquendo 2B	José DeLeón P	
1991	Rex Hudler CF	Ozzie Smith SS	Bernard Gilkey LF	Pedro Guerrero 1B	Félix José RF	Todd Zeile 3B	Tom Pagnozzi C	José Oquendo 2B	Bryn Smith P	
1990	Vince Coleman LF	Willie McGee CF	Todd Zeile C	Pedro Guerrero 1B	Terry Pendleton 3B	Tom Brunansky RF	Ozzie Smith SS	José Oquendo 2B	Joe Magrane P	
1989	Vince Coleman LF	Willie McGee CF	Terry Pendleton 3B	Pedro Guerrero 1B	Tom Brunansky RF	José Oquendo SS	Tony Peña C	Tim Jones 2B	Joe Magrane P	
1988	Vince Coleman LF	Ozzie Smith SS	Tom Herr 2B	Bob Horner 1B	Willie McGee CF	Terry Pendleton 3B	Tony Peña C	Jim Lindeman RF	Joe Magrane P	
1987	Vince Coleman LF	Ozzie Smith SS	Tom Herr 2B	Jack Clark 1B	Jim Lindeman RF	Tony Peña C	Terry Pendleton 3B	Tito Landrum CF	John Tudor P	
1986	Vince Coleman LF	Willie McGee CF	Tom Herr 2B	Jack Clark 1B	Andy Van Slyke RF	Terry Pendleton 3B	Mike Heath C	Ozzie Smith SS	John Tudor P	
1985	Lonnie Smith LF	Tom Herr 2B	Terry Pendleton 3B	Jack Clark 1B	Darrell Porter C	Steve Braun RF	Andy Van Slyke CF	Ozzie Smith SS	Joaquín Andújar P	
1984	Lonnie Smith LF	Ken Oberkfell 3B	Tom Herr 2B	George Hendrick RF	Art Howe 1B	Willie McGee CF	Darrell Porter C	Ozzie Smith SS	Dave LaPoint P	
1983	Lonnie Smith LF	Ozzie Smith SS	Keith Hernandez 1B	George Hendrick RF	David Green CF	Darrell Porter C	Ken Oberkfell 3B	Mike Ramsey 2B	Bob Forsch P	
1982	Lonnie Smith CF	Tom Herr 2B	Keith Hernandez 1B	Darrell Porter C	George Hendrick RF	Dane Iorg LF	Steve Braun 3B	Ozzie Smith SS	Bob Forsch P	
1981	Garry Templeton SS	Ken Oberkfell 3B	Keith Hernandez 1B	George Hendrick RF	Darrell Porter C	Sixto Lezcano LF	Tony Scott CF	Tom Herr 2B	Bob Forsch P	
1980	Garry Templeton SS	Ken Oberkfell 2B	Keith Hernandez 1B	Ted Simmons C	Bobby Bonds LF	George Hendrick RF	Tony Scott CF	Ken Reitz 3B	Pete Vuckovich P	
1979	Lou Brock LF	Garry Templeton SS	Keith Hernandez 1B	Ted Simmons C	George Hendrick CF	Tony Scott RF	Ken Reitz 3B	Mike Tyson 2B	John Denny P	
1978	Lou Brock LF	Garry Templeton SS	Jerry Morales RF	Ted Simmons C	Keith Hernandez 1B	Ken Reitz 3B	Tony Scott CF	Mike Tyson 2B	Bob Forsch P	
1977	Lou Brock LF	Garry Templeton SS	Bake McBride CF	Héctor Cruz RF	Ted Simmons C	Keith Hernandez 1B	Ken Reitz 3B	Mike Tyson 2B	John Denny P	
1976	Lou Brock LF	Lee Richard SS	Bake McBride CF	Ted Simmons C	Reggie Smith RF	Keith Hernandez 1B	Héctor Cruz 3B	Mike Tyson 2B	Lynn McGlothen P	
1975	Lou Brock LF	Ted Sizemore 2B	Bake McBride CF	Reggie Smith RF	Ted Simmons C	Keith Hernandez 1B	Ken Reitz 3B	Ed Brinkman SS	Bob Gibson P	
1974	Lou Brock LF	Ted Sizemore 2B	Reggie Smith RF	Joe Torre 1B	Ted Simmons C	Bake McBride CF	Ken Reitz 3B	Mike Tyson SS	Bob Gibson P	
1973	Lou Brock LF	Ted Sizemore 2B	José Cruz CF	Joe Torre 1B	Ted Simmons C	Ken Reitz 3B	Bernie Carbo RF	Ray Busse SS	Bob Gibson P	
1972	Lou Brock LF	Ted Sizemore 2B	Matty Alou RF	Joe Torre 3B	Ted Simmons C	Joe Hague 1B	José Cruz CF	Dal Maxvill SS	Bob Gibson P	
1971	Matty Alou CF	Ted Sizemore SS	Lou Brock LF	Joe Torre 3B	José Cardenal RF	Joe Hague 1B	Ted Simmons C	Julián Javier 2B	Bob Gibson P	
1970	Lou Brock LF	José Cardenal CF	Dick Allen 3B	Joe Torre C	Leron Lee RF	Joe Hague 1B	Julián Javier 2B	Dal Maxvill SS	Bob Gibson P	
1969	Lou Brock LF	Curt Flood CF	Vada Pinson RF	Joe Torre 1B	Tim McCarver C	Mike Shannon 3B	Julián Javier 2B	Dal Maxvill SS	Bob Gibson P	
1968	Lou Brock LF	Curt Flood CF	Roger Maris RF	Orlando Cepeda 1B	Tim McCarver C	Mike Shannon 3B	Julián Javier 2B	Dal Maxvill SS	Bob Gibson P	
1967	Lou Brock LF	Curt Flood CF	Roger Maris RF	Orlando Cepeda 1B	Mike Shannon 3B	Tim McCarver C	Julián Javier 2B	Dal Maxvill SS	Bob Gibson P	
1966	Lou Brock RF	Julián Javier 2B	Curt Flood CF	Tim McCarver C	Charley Smith 3B	Alex Johnson LF	George Kernek 1B	Jerry Buchek SS	Curt Simmons P	
1965	Curt Flood CF	Lou Brock LF	Bill White 1B	Ken Boyer 3B	Dick Groat SS	Mike Shannon RF	Julián Javier 2B	Bob Uecker C	Bob Gibson P	
1964	Julián Javier 2B	Dick Groat SS	Bill White 1B	Charlie James LF	Ken Boyer 3B	Carl Warwick RF	Curt Flood CF	Bob Uecker C	Ernie Broglio P	
1963	Curt Flood CF	Dick Groat SS	Bill White 1B	George Altman RF	Ken Boyer 3B	Stan Musial LF	Carl Sawatski C	Julián Javier 2B	Ernie Broglio P	
1962	Curt Flood CF	Julián Javier 2B	Bill White 1B	Stan Musial RF	Ken Boyer 3B	Minnie Miñoso LF	Gene Oliver C	Julio Gotay SS	Larry Jackson P	
1961	Julián Javier 2B	Don Landrum CF	Bill White 1B	Ken Boyer 3B	Stan Musial LF	Daryl Spencer SS	Joe Cunningham RF	Hal Smith C	Ernie Broglio P	
1960	Joe Cunningham RF	Daryl Spencer SS	Bill White CF	Ken Boyer 3B	Stan Musial 1B	Leon Wagner LF	Hal Smith C	Alex Grammas 2B	Larry Jackson P	
1959	Don Blasingame 2B	Gino Cimoli CF	Bill White 1B	Ken Boyer 3B	Stan Musial LF	Joe Cunningham RF	Hal Smith C	Alex Grammas SS	Larry Jackson P	
1958	Don Blasingame 2B	Alvin Dark SS	Stan Musial 1B	Del Ennis LF	Ken Boyer 3B	Wally Moon RF	Bobby Smith CF	Hobie Landrith C	Vinegar Bend Mizell P	
1957	Don Blasingame 2B	Alvin Dark SS	Stan Musial 1B	Del Ennis RF	Ken Boyer 3B	Wally Moon LF	Hal Smith C	Bobby Smith CF	Herm Wehmeier P	
1956	Wally Moon 1B	Red Schoendienst 2B	Stan Musial RF	Hank Sauer LF	Ken Boyer 3B	Bill Virdon CF	Bill Sarni C	Alex Grammas SS	Vinegar Bend Mizell P	
1955	Wally Moon LF	Bill Virdon CF	Stan Musial 1B	Rip Repulski RF	Red Schoendienst 2B	Ken Boyer 3B	Bill Sarni C	Alex Grammas SS	Brooks Lawrence P	
1954	Rip Repulski RF	Wally Moon CF	Red Schoendienst 2B	Stan Musial LF	Ray Jablonski 3B	Tom Alston 1B	Alex Grammas SS	Del Rice C	Harvey Haddix P	
1953	Solly Hemus SS	Red Schoendienst 2B	Stan Musial LF	Steve Bilko 1B	Enos Slaughter RF	Ray Jablonski 3B	Rip Repulski CF	Del Rice C	Gerry Staley P	
1952	Solly Hemus SS	Red Schoendienst 2B	Stan Musial LF	Enos Slaughter RF	Wally Westlake CF	Steve Bilko 1B	Billy Johnson 3B	Del Rice C	Gerry Staley P	
1951	Peanuts Lowrey CF	Red Schoendienst 2B	Enos Slaughter RF	Stan Musial LF	Don Richmond 3B	Steve Bilko 1B	Joe Garagiola C	Solly Hemus SS	Tom Poholsky P	
1950	Harry Walker CF	Red Schoendienst 2B	Stan Musial RF	Enos Slaughter LF	Eddie Kazak 3B	Rocky Nelson 1B	Joe Garagiola C	Eddie Miller SS	Gerry Staley P	
1949	Tommy Glaviano 3B	Red Schoendienst 2B	Stan Musial CF	Enos Slaughter LF	Nippy Jones 1B	Ron Northey RF	Marty Marion SS	Del Rice C	Harry Brecheen P	
1948	Erv Dusak CF	Red Schoendienst 2B	Stan Musial RF	Enos Slaughter LF	Whitey Kurowski 3B	Nippy Jones 1B	Del Wilber C	Marty Marion SS	Murry Dickson P	
1947	Red Schoendienst 2B	Harry Walker CF	Stan Musial 1B	Enos Slaughter RF	Whitey Kurowski 3B	Dick Sisler LF	Marty Marion SS	Joe Garagiola C	Howie Pollet P	
1946	Lou Klein 2B	Terry Moore CF	Stan Musial LF	Enos Slaughter RF	Whitey Kurowski 3B	Dick Sisler 1B	Marty Marion SS	Del Rice C	Johnny Beazley P	
1945	Augie Bergamo RF	Johnny Hopp CF	Red Schoendienst LF	Walker Cooper C	Ray Sanders 1B	Whitey Kurowski 3B	Marty Marion SS	Emil Verban 2B	Ted Wilks P	
1944	Emil Verban 2B	Johnny Hopp CF	Stan Musial RF	Walker Cooper C	Ray Sanders 1B	Whitey Kurowski 3B	Danny Litwhiler LF	Marty Marion SS	Max Lanier P	
1943	Jimmy Brown 2B	Frank Demaree RF	Stan Musial LF	Whitey Kurowski 3B	Walker Cooper C	Buster Adams CF	Johnny Hopp 1B	Lou Klein SS	Mort Cooper P	
1942	Creepy Crespi 2B	Stan Musial LF	Terry Moore CF	Enos Slaughter RF	Ray Sanders 1B	Jimmy Brown 3B	Ken O'Dea C	Marty Marion SS	Mort Cooper P	
1941	Ernie Koy LF	Jimmy Brown 3B	Terry Moore CF	Johnny Mize 1B	Enos Slaughter RF	Gus Mancuso C	Marty Marion SS	Creepy Crespi 2B	Lon Warneke P	
1940	Jimmy Brown 3B	Stu Martin 2B	Enos Slaughter RF	Johnny Mize 1B	Don Padgett C	Pepper Martin LF	Terry Moore CF	Marty Marion SS	Curt Davis P	
1939	Jimmy Brown 2B	Don Gutteridge 3B	Enos Slaughter RF	Joe Medwick LF	Johnny Mize 1B	Terry Moore CF	Mickey Owen C	Joe Orengo SS	Bob Weiland P	
1938	Don Gutteridge SS	Stu Martin 2B	Enos Slaughter RF	Don Padgett LF	Johnny Mize 1B	Pepper Martin 3B	Terry Moore CF	Mickey Owen C	Bob Weiland P	
1937	Terry Moore CF	Stu Martin 2B	Frenchy Bordagaray 3B	Joe Medwick LF	Johnny Mize 1B	Pepper Martin RF	Leo Durocher SS	Bruce Ogrodowski C	Dizzy Dean P	
1936	Terry Moore CF	Frankie Frisch 2B	Pepper Martin RF	Joe Medwick LF	Ripper Collins 1B	Spud Davis C	Charlie Gelbert 3B	Leo Durocher SS	Dizzy Dean P	
1935	Pepper Martin 3B	Jack Rothrock RF	Frankie Frisch 2B	Joe Medwick LF	Ripper Collins 1B	Bill DeLancey C	Terry Moore CF	Leo Durocher SS	Dizzy Dean P	
1934	Terry Moore CF	Frankie Frisch 2B	Pepper Martin 3B	Jack Rothrock LF	Joe Medwick RF	Ripper Collins 1B	Spud Davis C	Leo Durocher SS	Dizzy Dean P	
1933	Sparky Adams 3B	George Watkins RF	Frankie Frisch 2B	Ripper Collins 1B	Joe Medwick LF	Ernie Orsatti CF	Jimmie Wilson C	Gordon Slade SS	Dizzy Dean P	
1932	Sparky Adams 3B	Ray Blades RF	Frankie Frisch 2B	Jim Bottomley 1B	Ripper Collins LF	Pepper Martin CF	Jimmie Wilson C	Charlie Gelbert SS	Flint Rhem P	
1931	Taylor Douthit CF	Ernie Orsatti LF	Frankie Frisch 2B	Jim Bottomley 1B	George Watkins RF	Charlie Gelbert SS	Sparky Adams 3B	Jimmie Wilson C	Flint Rhem P	
1930	Taylor Douthit CF	Sparky Adams 2B	Frankie Frisch 3B	Jim Bottomley 1B	Chick Hafey LF	Showboat Fisher RF	Charlie Gelbert SS	Jimmie Wilson C	Flint Rhem P	
1929	Taylor Douthit CF	Fred Haney 3B	Frankie Frisch 2B	Jim Bottomley 1B	Chick Hafey LF	Wally Roettger RF	Charlie Gelbert SS	Bubber Jonnard C	Grover Alexander P	
1928	Taylor Douthit CF	Wattie Holm 3B	Frankie Frisch 2B	Jim Bottomley 1B	Chick Hafey LF	Wally Roettger RF	Tommy Thevenow SS	Bob O'Farrell C	Jesse Haines P	
1927	Taylor Douthit CF	Billy Southworth RF	Frankie Frisch 2B	Jim Bottomley 1B	Les Bell 3B	Chick Hafey LF	Bob O'Farrell C	Tommy Thevenow SS	Grover Alexander P	
1926	Ray Blades LF	Heinie Mueller CF	Rogers Hornsby 2B	Jim Bottomley 1B	Chick Hafey RF	Les Bell 3B	Bob O'Farrell C	Tommy Thevenow SS	Flint Rhem P	
1925	Max Flack RF	Heinie Mueller CF	Rogers Hornsby 2B	Jim Bottomley 1B	Les Bell 3B	Wattie Holm LF	Walter Schmidt C	Tommy Thevenow SS	Jesse Haines P	
1924	Max Flack RF	Jack Smith LF	Rogers Hornsby 2B	Jim Bottomley 1B	Howard Freigau 3B	Heinie Mueller CF	Les Bell SS	Ernie Vick C	Johnny Stuart P	
1923	Ray Blades LF	Jack Smith RF	Rogers Hornsby 2B	Jim Bottomley 1B	Milt Stock 3B	Heinie Mueller CF	Howard Freigau SS	Eddie Ainsmith C	Jeff Pfeffer P	
1922	Les Mann CF	Del Gainer 1B	Milt Stock 3B	Rogers Hornsby 2B	Joe Schultz RF	Austin McHenry LF	Specs Toporcer SS	Verne Clemons C	Bill Sherdel P	
1921	Heinie Mueller RF	Cliff Heathcote CF	Milt Stock 3B	Rogers Hornsby LF	Jack Fournier 1B	Doc Lavan SS	Verne Clemons C	Specs Toporcer 2B	Jesse Haines P	
1920	Burt Shotton LF	Cliff Heathcote RF	Milt Stock 3B	Rogers Hornsby 2B	Jack Fournier 1B	Austin McHenry CF	Hal Janvrin SS	Verne Clemons C	Bill Doak P	
1919	Burt Shotton LF	Jack Smith RF	Austin McHenry CF	Rogers Hornsby SS	Milt Stock 3B	Gene Paulette 1B	Bob Fisher 2B	Frank Snyder C	Jakie May P	
1918	Red Smyth RF	Jack Smith CF	Doug Baird 3B	Rogers Hornsby SS	Walton Cruise LF	Gene Paulette 1B	Mike González C	Bruno Betzel 2B	Lee Meadows P	
1917	Bob Bescher LF	Bruno Betzel 2B	Tom Long RF	Dots Miller 1B	Rogers Hornsby SS	Walton Cruise CF	Fred Smith 3B	Frank Snyder C	Lee Meadows P	
1916	Bob Bescher LF	Zinn Beck 3B	Jack Smith CF	Dots Miller 1B	Tom Long RF	Bruno Betzel 2B	Rogers Hornsby SS	Frank Snyder C	Bill Doak P	
1915	Cozy Dolan CF	Miller Huggins 2B	Bob Bescher LF	Dots Miller 1B	Chief Wilson RF	Zinn Beck 3B	Rolla Daringer SS	Frank Snyder C	Slim Sallee P	
1914	Miller Huggins 2B	Lee Magee CF	Art Butler SS	Dots Miller 1B	Chief Wilson RF	Cozy Dolan 3B	Walton Cruise LF	Ivey Wingo C	Dan Griner P	
1913	Miller Huggins 2B	Lee Magee LF	Mike Mowrey 3B	Ed Konetchy 1B	Steve Evans RF	Rebel Oakes CF	Charley O'Leary SS	Ivey Wingo C	Dan Griner P	
1912	Miller Huggins 2B	Rube Ellis LF	Rebel Oakes CF	Ed Konetchy 1B	Steve Evans RF	Mike Mowrey 3B	Arnold Hauser SS	Jack Bliss C	Bob Harmon P	
1911	Miller Huggins 2B	Rube Ellis LF	Mike Mowrey 3B	Ed Konetchy 1B	Steve Evans RF	Roger Bresnahan C	Rebel Oakes CF	Arnold Hauser SS	Slim Sallee P	
1910	Miller Huggins 2B	Rube Ellis LF	Rebel Oakes CF	Ed Konetchy 1B	Steve Evans RF	Roger Bresnahan C	Rudy Hulswitt SS	Jap Barbeau 3B	Vic Willis P	
1909	Bobby Byrne 3B	Al Shaw CF	Roger Bresnahan C	Ed Konetchy 1B	Steve Evans RF	Joe Delahanty LF	Chappy Charles 2B	Champ Osteen SS	Johnny Lush P	
1908	Chappy Charles 3B	Shad Barry RF	Joe Delahanty LF	Ed Konetchy 1B	Red Murray CF	Bobby Byrne SS	Billy Gilbert 2B	Art Hoelskoetter C	Johnny Lush P	
1907	John Kelly RF	Tom O'Hara LF	Pug Bennett 2B	Jake Beckley 1B	Bobby Byrne 3B	Ed Holly SS	Al Burch CF	Doc Marshall C	Art Fromme P	
1906	Pug Bennett 2B	Spike Shannon LF	Mike Grady C	Homer Smoot RF	Jake Beckley 1B	Jack Himes CF	Harry Arndt 3B	George McBride SS	Jack Taylor P	
1905	John Farrell 2B	Spike Shannon LF	Homer Smoot CF	Dave Brain SS	Mike Grady 1B	Jack Dunleavy RF	Jimmy Burke 3B	Jack Warner C	Chappie McFarland P	
1904	John Farrell 2B	Spike Shannon RF	Homer Smoot CF	Jake Beckley 1B	Danny Shay SS	Jimmy Burke 3B	George Barclay LF	Bill Byers C	Jack Taylor P	
1903	John Farrell 2B	Homer Smoot CF	Dave Brain 3B	George Barclay LF	Patsy Donovan RF	Art Nichols 1B	Otto Williams SS	Jack Ryan C	Clarence Currie P	
1902	John Farrell 2B	George Barclay LF	Fred Hartman 3B	Homer Smoot CF	Otto Krueger SS	Patsy Donovan RF	Doc Hazelton 1B	Jack Ryan C	Stan Yerkes P	
1901	Jesse Burkett LF	Emmet Heidrick CF	Patsy Donovan RF	Dan McGann 1B	Bobby Wallace SS	Dick Padden 2B	Otto Krueger 3B	Jack Ryan C	Jack Powell P	

=== Opening Day salaries ===
Opening Day payrolls for 25-man roster (since 2000): 2018–23 payroll obligations
2020 season shortened to 60 games. Payroll adjusted from $168,930,500 to $69,461,295.

Opening Day salary (ML contracts plus pro-rated signing bonuses)
Year	Salary
2000	$ 63,900,000
2001	$ 78,538,333
2002	$ 74,660,875
2003	$ 83,786,666
2004	$ 83,228,333
2005	$ 92,106,833
2006	$ 88,891,371
2007	$ 90,286,823
2008	$ 99,624,449
2009	$ 88,528,409
2010	$ 94,220,500
2011	$109,048,000
2012	$111,858,500
2013	$116,790,787
2014	$111,250,000
2015	$122,066,500
2016	$145,553,500
2017	$148,152,933
2018	$159,698,667
2019	$162,620,267
2020	$ 69,461,295
2021	$163,542,500
2022	$154,987,997
2023	$176,587,308
2024	$175,158,567
2025	$137,955,865

== Notes ==
Awards and achievements
Preceded by Pittsburgh Pirates; 1925	World Series champions 1926	Succeeded by New York Yankees; 1927–1928
Preceded by Philadelphia Athletics; 1929–1930	World Series champions 1931	Succeeded by New York Yankees; 1932
Preceded by New York Giants; 1933	World Series champions 1934	Succeeded by Detroit Tigers; 1935
Preceded by New York Yankees; 1941	World Series champions 1942	Succeeded by New York Yankees; 1943
Preceded by New York Yankees; 1943	World Series champions 1944	Succeeded by Detroit Tigers; 1945
Preceded by Detroit Tigers; 1945	World Series champions 1946	Succeeded by New York Yankees; 1947
Preceded by Los Angeles Dodgers; 1963	World Series champions 1964	Succeeded by Los Angeles Dodgers; 1965
Preceded by Baltimore Orioles; 1966	World Series champions 1967	Succeeded by Detroit Tigers; 1968
Preceded by Los Angeles Dodgers; 1981	World Series champions 1982	Succeeded by Baltimore Orioles; 1983
Preceded by Chicago White Sox; 2005	World Series champions 2006	Succeeded by Boston Red Sox; 2007
Preceded by San Francisco Giants; 2010	World Series champions 2011	Succeeded by San Francisco Giants; 2012
Preceded by Pittsburgh Pirates; 1925	National League champions 1926	Succeeded by Pittsburgh Pirates; 1927
Preceded by Pittsburgh Pirates; 1927	National League champions 1928	Succeeded by Chicago Cubs; 1929
Preceded by Chicago Cubs; 1929	National League champions 1930–1931	Succeeded by Chicago Cubs; 1932
Preceded by New York Giants; 1933	National League champions 1934	Succeeded by Chicago Cubs; 1935
Preceded by Brooklyn Dodgers; 1941	National League champions 1942–1944	Succeeded by Chicago Cubs; 1945
Preceded by Chicago Cubs; 1945	National League champions 1946	Succeeded by Brooklyn Dodgers; 1947
Preceded by Los Angeles Dodgers; 1963	National League champions 1964	Succeeded by Los Angeles Dodgers; 1965–1966
Preceded by Los Angeles Dodgers; 1965–1966	National League champions 1967–1968	Succeeded by New York Mets; 1969
Preceded by Los Angeles Dodgers; 1981	National League champions 1982	Succeeded by Philadelphia Phillies; 1983
Preceded by San Diego Padres; 1984	National League champions 1985	Succeeded by New York Mets; 1986
Preceded by New York Mets; 1986	National League champions 1987	Succeeded by Los Angeles Dodgers; 1988
Preceded by Florida Marlins; 2003	National League champions 2004	Succeeded by Houston Astros; 2005
Preceded by Houston Astros; 2005	National League champions 2006	Succeeded by Colorado Rockies; 2007
Preceded by San Francisco Giants; 2010	National League champions 2011	Succeeded by San Francisco Giants; 2012
Preceded by San Francisco Giants; 2012	National League champions 2013	Succeeded by San Francisco Giants; 2014
Preceded by New York Metropolitans; 1884	American Association champions St. Louis Browns; 1885–1888	Succeeded by Brooklyn Bridegrooms; 1889
