= 1950 St. Louis Cardinals season =

Major League Baseball season

1950 St. Louis Cardinals
- League: National League
- Ballpark: Sportsman's Park
- City: St. Louis, Missouri
- Record: 78–75 (.510)
- League place: 5th
- Owners: Fred Saigh
- General managers: William Walsingham Jr.
- Managers: Eddie Dyer
- Television: KSD
- Radio: WIL (Harry Caray, Gabby Street, Stretch Miller)

The 1950 St. Louis Cardinals season was the team's 69th season in St. Louis, Missouri and its 59th season in the National League. The Cardinals went 78–75 during the season and finished fifth in the National League.

== Offseason ==
- December 5, 1949: Bill Sarni was drafted by the Cardinals from the Shreveport Sports in the 1949 minor league draft.
- December 14, 1949: Lou Klein and Ron Northey were traded by the Cardinals to the Cincinnati Reds for Harry Walker.

== Regular season ==
=== Season standings ===
National League
Team	W	L	Pct.	GB	Home	Road
Philadelphia Phillies	91	63	.591	—	48‍–‍29	43‍–‍34
Brooklyn Dodgers	89	65	.578	2	48‍–‍30	41‍–‍35
New York Giants	86	68	.558	5	44‍–‍32	42‍–‍36
Boston Braves	83	71	.539	8	46‍–‍31	37‍–‍40
St. Louis Cardinals	78	75	.510	12½	48‍–‍28	30‍–‍47
Cincinnati Reds	66	87	.431	24½	38‍–‍38	28‍–‍49
Chicago Cubs	64	89	.418	26½	35‍–‍42	29‍–‍47
Pittsburgh Pirates	57	96	.373	33½	33‍–‍44	24‍–‍52

=== Record vs. opponents ===
1950 National League record Sources:
Team	BSN	BRO	CHC	CIN	NYG	PHI	PIT	STL
Boston	—	9–13	9–13	17–5	13–9	9–13–1	15–7–1	11–11
Brooklyn	13–9	—	10–12	12–10	12–10	11–11–1	19–3	12–10
Chicago	13–9	12–10	—	4–17	5–17	9–13–1	11–11	10–12
Cincinnati	5–17	10–12	17–4	—	11–11	4–18	12–10	7–15
New York	9–13	10–12	17–5	11–11	—	12–10	16–6	11–11
Philadelphia	13–9–1	11–11–1	13–9–1	18–4	10–12	—	14–8	12–10
Pittsburgh	7–15–1	3–19	11–11	10–12	6–16	8–14	—	12–9
St. Louis	11–11	10–12	12–10	15–7	11–11	10–12	9–12	—

=== Notable transactions ===
- September 7, 1950: Peanuts Lowrey was purchased by the Cardinals from the Cincinnati Reds.

=== Roster ===
1950 St. Louis Cardinals
Roster
Pitchers: 24 Cloyd Boyer; 27 Al Brazle; 31 Harry Brecheen; 38 Cot Deal; 7 Erv Dusak; 34 Jim Hearn; 35 Ken Johnson; 23 Max Lanier; 39 Fred Martin; 20 Red Munger; 41 Al Papai; 10 Tom Poholsky; 11 Howie Pollet; 14 Jerry Staley; 28 Ted Wilks	Catchers: 15 Johnny Bucha; 17 Joe Garagiola; 18 Del Rice; Infielders: 5 Steve Bilko; 40 Don Bollweg; 12 Tommy Glaviano; 22 Solly Hemus; 3 Nippy Jones; 21 Eddie Kazak; 29,37 Peanuts Lowrey; 4 Marty Marion; 22 Ed Mickelson; 33 Eddie Miller; 19 Rocky Nelson; 2 Red Schoendienst	Outfielders: 35 Johnny Blatnik; 32 Chuck Diering; 36 Bill Howerton; 5 Johnny Lindell; 6 Stan Musial; 1 Hal Rice; 9 Enos Slaughter; 1 Harry Walker; Other batters: 29 Danny Gardella; 40 Ed Mierkowicz	Manager: 30 Eddie Dyer; Coaches: 25 Tony Kaufmann; 4 Marty Marion; 8 Terry Moore; 26 Buzzy Wares

=== Opening Day Lineup ===
Opening Day Starters
#	Name	Position
1	Harry Walker	CF
2	Red Schoendienst	2B
6	Stan Musial	RF
9	Enos Slaughter	LF
21	Eddie Kazak	3B
19	Rocky Nelson	1B
17	Joe Garagiola	C
33	Eddie Miller	SS
14	Gerry Staley	P

== Player stats ==
= Indicates team leader

= Indicates league leader

=== Batting ===
==== Starters by position ====
Note: Pos = Position; G = Games played; AB = At bats; H = Hits; Avg. = Batting average; HR = Home runs; RBI = Runs batted in

Pos	Player	G	AB	H	Avg.	HR	RBI
C	Del Rice	130	414	101	.244	9	54
1B	Rocky Nelson	76	235	58	.247	1	20
2B	Red Schoendienst	153	642	177	.276	7	63
SS	Marty Marion	106	372	92	.247	4	40
3B	Tommy Glaviano	115	410	117	.285	11	44
OF	Stan Musial	146	555	192	.346	28	109
OF	Enos Slaughter	148	556	161	.290	10	101
OF	Bill Howerton	110	313	88	.281	10	58

==== Other batters ====
Note: G = Games played; AB = At bats; H = Hits; Avg. = Batting average; HR = Home runs; RBI = Runs batted in

Player	G	AB	H	Avg.	HR	RBI
Eddie Kazak	93	207	53	.256	5	23
Chuck Diering	89	204	51	.250	3	18
Eddie Miller	64	172	39	.227	3	22
Harry Walker	60	150	31	.207	0	7
Hal Rice	44	128	27	.211	2	11
Johnny Lindell	36	113	21	.186	5	16
Joe Garagiola	34	88	28	.318	2	20
Peanuts Lowrey	17	56	15	.268	1	4
Johnny Bucha	22	36	5	.139	0	1
Steve Bilko	10	33	6	.182	0	2
Nippy Jones	13	26	6	.231	0	6
Johnny Blatnik	7	20	3	.150	0	1
Solly Hemus	11	15	2	.133	0	0
Don Bollweg	4	11	2	.182	0	1
Ed Mickelson	5	10	1	.100	0	1
Danny Gardella	1	1	0	.000	0	0
Ed Mierkowicz	1	1	0	.000	0	0

=== Pitching ===
==== Starting pitchers ====
Note: G = Games pitched; IP = Innings pitched; W = Wins; L = Losses; ERA = Earned run average; SO = Strikeouts

Player	G	IP	W	L	ERA	SO
Howie Pollet	37	232.1	14	13	3.29	117
Max Lanier	27	181.1	11	9	3.13	89
Gerry Staley	42	169.2	13	13	4.99	62
Harry Brecheen	27	163.1	8	11	3.80	80

==== Other pitchers ====
Note: G = Games pitched; IP = Innings pitched; W = Wins; L = Losses; ERA = Earned run average; SO = Strikeouts

Player	G	IP	W	L	ERA	SO
Al Brazle	46	164.2	11	9	4.10	47
Red Munger	32	154.2	7	8	3.90	61
Cloyd Boyer	36	120.1	7	7	3.52	82
Erv Dusak	14	36.1	0	2	3.72	16
Tom Poholsky	5	14.2	0	0	3.65	2

==== Relief pitchers ====
Note: G = Games pitched; W = Wins; L = Losses; SV = Saves; ERA = Earned run average; SO = Strikeouts

Player	G	W	L	SV	ERA	SO
Fred Martin	30	4	2	0	5.12	19
Ted Wilks	18	2	0	0	6.66	15
Al Papai	13	1	0	0	5.21	7
Jim Hearn	6	0	1	0	10.00	4
Cot Deal	3	0	0	0	18.00	1
Ken Johnson	2	0	0	0	0.00	1

== Farm system ==
Level	Team	League	Manager
AAA	Columbus Red Birds	American Association	Rollie Hemsley
AAA	Rochester Red Wings	International League	Johnny Keane
AA	Houston Buffaloes	Texas League	Kemp Wicker and Benny Borgmann
A	Columbus Cardinals	Sally League	Hal Anderson
A	Omaha Cardinals	Western League	Al Hollingsworth
B	Winston-Salem Cardinals	Carolina League	George Kissell
B	Allentown Cardinals	Interstate League	Gene Corbett
B	Lynchburg Cardinals	Piedmont League	Whitey Kurowski
B	Montgomery Rebels	Southeastern League	Charlie Metro
C	Fresno Cardinals	California League	Roland LeBlanc
C	Duluth Dukes	Northern League	Russ Rolandson
C	Pocatello Cardinals	Pioneer League	Larry Barton, Sr.
C	St. Joseph Cardinals	Western Association	Harold Olt

Level	Team	League	Manager
D	Geneva Redbirds	Alabama State League	Johnny Grodzicki and Bob Comiskey
D	Johnson City Cardinals	Appalachian League	Ben Catchings
D	Goldsboro Cardinals	Coastal Plain League	Jim Herbison
D	Willows Cardinals	Far West League	Ray Malgradi
D	Albany Cardinals	Georgia–Florida League	Sheldon "Chief" Bender
D	West Frankfort Cardinals	Mississippi–Ohio Valley League	Bob Stanton
D	Lebanon Chicks	North Atlantic League	Harold Contini
D	Hamilton Cardinals	PONY League	Vedie Himsl

LEAGUE CHAMPIONS: Columbus (American Assn.), Winston-Salem, Lebanon
