= Murry Dickson =

American baseball player (1916–1989)

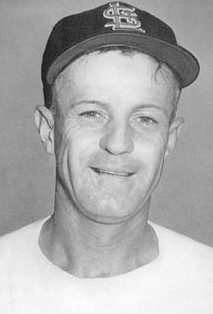
- Dickson in 1957
- Pitcher
- Born: August 21, 1916; Tracy, Missouri, U.S.
- Died: September 21, 1989 (aged 73); Kansas City, Kansas, U.S.
- Batted: Right Threw: Right

MLB debut
- September 30, 1939, for the St. Louis Cardinals

Last MLB appearance
- September 14, 1959, for the Kansas City Athletics

MLB statistics
- Win–loss record: 172–181
- Earned run average: 3.66
- Strikeouts: 1,281
- Stats at Baseball Reference

Teams
- St. Louis Cardinals (1939–1940, 1942–1943, 1946–1948); Pittsburgh Pirates (1949–1953); Philadelphia Phillies (1954–1956); St. Louis Cardinals (1956–1957); Kansas City Athletics (1958); New York Yankees (1958); Kansas City Athletics (1959)

Career highlights and awards
- All-Star (1953); 2× World Series champion (1946, 1958)

Murry Monroe Dickson (August 21, 1916 – September 21, 1989) was an American professional baseball right-handed pitcher, who played in Major League Baseball (MLB) during the 1940s and 1950s. He was known for his vast array of pitches and deliveries — one of his managers, Eddie Dyer, nicknamed him "Thomas Edison" for his inventiveness — and for the longevity of his career.

Although Dickson would lead the National League (NL) in defeats for three successive seasons (1952–54), he pitched the St. Louis Cardinals to the 1946 NL pennant by beating the Brooklyn Dodgers in the decisive Game 2 of the league playoffs. Then, during the 1946 World Series, he started Game 7 against the Boston Red Sox, a game the Cards would ultimately win for the world championship.

Born in Tracy, Missouri, Dickson graduated from Leavenworth High School and entered professional baseball and the vast Cardinal farm system in 1937. After three outstanding minor league seasons with the 1939 Houston Buffaloes (winning 22 games to lead the Texas League) and the 1940–41 Columbus Red Birds, Dickson joined the Cardinals for good in 1942. He compiled a 14–5 record for the Cards in 1942–43 (both clubs reaching the World Series) before joining the U.S. Army for military service during World War II. Stationed at Fort Riley, Kansas, Fort George G. Meade, Maryland, and Camp Shanks, New York, he later served in the European Theater of Operations where he was a jeep driver in the 35th Cavalry Reconnaissance Troop, 35th Infantry Division.

In 1946, Dickson returned to the Major Leagues and won 15 games for pennant- and world title-bound Cardinals, none bigger than his defeat of the Dodgers in the 1946 National League tie-breaker series. The two teams had finished in a dead heat after the 154-game regular-season schedule; according to National League bylaws of the time, they would play a best-of-three series to determine the league champion. St. Louis won the opening game behind Howie Pollet, and in Game 2, in Ebbets Field, Dickson shut down the home club until the ninth inning, and the Cards racked up an 8–4 victory and the league pennant. He led the league in winning percentage (.714) that season. Dickson lost Game 3 of the 1946 World Series to the Red Sox, but pitched seven strong innings in the Series' final game, with Harry Brecheen getting the win after St. Louis rallied in the eighth stanza.

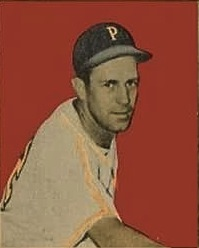
Dickson's 1949 Bowman Gum baseball card

Dickson compiled an over .500 won-loss record only once in the next eight years, but it was a notable effort. His contract was sold to the Pittsburgh Pirates on January 29, 1949. In 1951, Dickson won 20 games (losing 16) for the seventh-place Pirates, who won only 64 contests for the entire season. He had 19 complete games that season, and 21 in 1952, when he won 14 and lost 21 for a last-place Pittsburgh team that won only 42 games all year. (Thus Dickson accounted for 31 percent of Pirate victories in 1951, and a full one-third of the team's wins in 1952.) He then dropped 19 decisions in 1953 and 20 more in 1954, his first season as a member of the Philadelphia Phillies.

Late in his career, however, Dickson experienced renewed success with a return to the Cardinals (1956–57) and as a relief pitcher in the American League (AL) for the Kansas City Athletics and New York Yankees (1958–59). He retired from the game at age 43 with a career mark of 172 victories, 181 losses (.487) and an earned run average of 3.66 over 18 seasons, 625 appearances and 3,052 1/3 innings pitched.

Dickson was a better than average hitting pitcher in his big league career, posting a .231 batting average (253-for-1095) with 81 runs, 34 doubles, 3 home runs, and 82 runs batted in (RBI).

On September 21, 1989, Dickson died at age 73 from emphysema in Kansas City, Kansas. He was buried at Sunset Memorial Gardens in Leavenworth.
