= Del Rice =

American baseball player and manager (1922–1983)

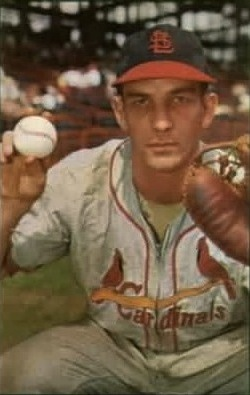
- Rice, c. 1953
- Catcher / Manager
- Born: October 27, 1922; Portsmouth, Ohio, U.S.
- Died: January 26, 1983 (aged 60); Garden Grove, California, U.S.
- Batted: Right Threw: Right

MLB debut
- May 2, 1945, for the St. Louis Cardinals

Last MLB appearance
- August 31, 1961, for the Los Angeles Angels

MLB statistics
- Batting average: .237
- Home runs: 79
- Runs batted in: 441
- Managerial record: 75–80
- Winning %: .484
- Stats at Baseball Reference

Teams
- As player: St. Louis Cardinals (1945–1955); Milwaukee Braves (1955–1959); Chicago Cubs (1960); St. Louis Cardinals (1960); Baltimore Orioles (1960); Los Angeles Angels (1961); As manager: California Angels (1972)

Career highlights and awards
- All-Star (1953); 2× World Series champion (1946, 1957)

Delbert W. Rice Jr. (October 27, 1922 – January 26, 1983) was an American professional baseball player, coach and manager. He played for 17 seasons as a catcher in Major League Baseball from 1945 to 1961, most notably for the St. Louis Cardinals. Although Rice was a relatively weak hitter, he sustained a lengthy career in the major leagues due to his valuable defensive abilities.

== Career ==
A native of Portsmouth, Ohio, Rice threw and batted right-handed and was listed as 6 feet 2 inches (1.88 m) tall and 190 pounds (86 kg). He attended Portsmouth High School where he starred in football, basketball and track as well as baseball. He was contracted as an amateur free agent by the St. Louis Cardinals in 1941. Although Rice received his induction notice into the military in 1943, he was turned down because of a physical disqualification. After playing in the minor leagues for four seasons, he made his major league debut with the Cardinals on May 2, 1945, at the age of 22.

Shortly after the season began, the Cardinals sold the contract for their star catcher, Walker Cooper to the New York Giants, leaving Rice to share catching duties with Ken O'Dea. Although they competed for the same job, the veteran O'Dea, who had played with Hall of Fame catcher Gabby Hartnett in Chicago during the 1930s, provided Rice with valuable help in learning the intricacies of catching in the major leagues. Rice posted a .261 batting average in 83 games as the Cardinals finished in second place, three games behind the Chicago Cubs.

Although he served as a backup catcher to Joe Garagiola in 1946, he regularly played whenever Harry Brecheen pitched. The Cardinals ended the season tied for first place with the Brooklyn Dodgers and the two teams met in the 1946 National League tie-breaker series. It was the first playoff tiebreaker in Major League Baseball history. The Cardinals won the first two games of the best-of-three game series to capture the National League pennant. In the 1946 World Series against the Boston Red Sox, Rice caught all three of Brecheen's victories, as the Cardinals defeated the Red Sox in seven games. He was also the hitting standout in Game 2, with a single, a double and a walk, scoring two runs in the Cardinals' 3–0 victory.

In 1947, Rice caught the majority of the team's games and guided the Cardinals' pitching staff to the lowest team earned run average and the most strikeouts in the National League, as the Cardinals finished in second place to the Dodgers. His pitch-calling skills were made evident once again in 1949, leading the Cardinals' pitching staff to the lowest team earned run average in the league, as the Cardinals once again finished in second place, one game behind the Dodgers.

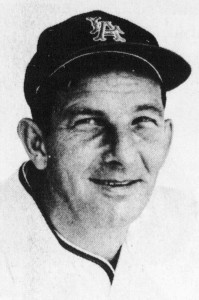
Rice as a coach for the Los Angeles Angels, circa 1965.

Rice had his best season in 1952, posting a .259 batting average along with 11 home runs and a career-high 65 runs batted in. He also led National League catchers in games played, putouts, assists and in baserunners caught stealing. The following season, Rice was named as a reserve player for the National League team in the 1953 All-Star Game, although an injury kept him from participating in the game. Rice was injured during a game against the Dodgers on June 7 1954 when Roy Campanella stole home and spiked Rice's leg. While he was sidelined with the injury, his replacement, Bill Sarni hit for a .300 average for the remainder of the season.

In the middle of the 1955 season, the 32-year-old Rice was traded to the Milwaukee Braves, who were in need of a backup catcher for their perennial All-Star, Del Crandall. He became pitcher Bob Buhl's personal catcher, as Buhl did not like having Crandall calling his pitches. In 1956, Rice helped Buhl to an 18–8 record as the Braves held first place with two games left in the season before the team faltered and finished the season one game behind the Dodgers.

In the 1957 season, Buhl again won 18 games and posted a 2.74 earned run average with Rice as his catcher, as the Braves won the National League pennant. Rice became a member of his second world championship winning team when the Braves defeated the New York Yankees in the 1957 World Series.

The Braves won the National League pennant for a second consecutive year in 1958, but lost a rematch with the Yankees in the 1958 World Series. In June 1959, Rice suffered a broken leg in a collision at home plate with Willie Mays. He missed more than two months of the season and was used sparingly upon his return. He played in only a handful of games before he was given a coaching position in late August to make room on the roster for another player. The Braves then released him at the end of the season.

Rice played for the Chicago Cubs in 1960, but was released in June when the Cubs acquired catcher Jim Hegan. One of the 18 games Rice caught as a Cub was Don Cardwell's no-hitter on May 15. He was then re-signed with the Cardinals, but only appeared in one game before being selected off waivers by the Baltimore Orioles in September. After appearing in only one game for the Orioles, he was released in October.

Rice became the first player ever to sign with the Los Angeles Angels expansion team. He played in 30 games during their inaugural 1961 campaign and was released as a player at the end of the season, but was retained within the organization. He played in his final major league game on August 31, 1961, at the age of 39.

== Career statistics ==
In a seventeen-year major league career, Rice played in 1,309 games, accumulating 908 hits in 3,826 at bats for a .237 career batting average along with 79 home runs, 441 runs batted in and an on-base percentage of .312. He ended his career with a .987 fielding percentage. Rice was known for his strong defensive skills, leading National League catchers in fielding percentage in 1948 and 1949, and tying for the lead in double plays in 1949, 1950 and 1951.

Rice also had a career in the National Basketball League, playing four seasons for the Rochester Royals from 1946 until 1950, when Fred Saigh, the Cardinals owner, asked him to concentrate on baseball.

== Coaching and managing career ==
Rice was a longtime member of the Angels' organization. After retiring as a player, he was retained as their first base coach from 1962 to 1966. He spent the 1967 season as a coach for the Cleveland Indians, but then returned to the Angels as a minor league manager and had success at the Triple-A level. He was named Minor League Manager of the Year for 1971 by The Sporting News after leading the Salt Lake City Bees to a divisional title in the Pacific Coast League.

Rice was rewarded with a promotion to manager of the 1972 Angels, but after one season and a 75–80 (.484) fifth-place finish, he was replaced by Bobby Winkles. He remained with the club, however, as a scout.

Rice died of complications from cancer while attending a benefit dinner in his honor in Garden Grove, California, on January 26, 1983, at the age of 60.
