= 1957 World Series =

1957 Major League Baseball championship series

Team (Wins)	Managers	Season
Milwaukee Braves (4)	Fred Haney	95–59, .617, GA: 8
New York Yankees (3)	Casey Stengel	98–56, .636, GA: 8
- Dates: October 2–10
- Venue(s): Yankee Stadium (New York); County Stadium (Milwaukee)
- MVP: Lew Burdette (Milwaukee)
- Umpires: Joe Paparella (AL), Jocko Conlan (NL), Bill McKinley (AL), Augie Donatelli (NL), Nestor Chylak (AL: outfield only), Frank Secory (NL: outfield only)
- Hall of Famers: Umpires: Jocko Conlan; Nestor Chylak; Braves: Hank Aaron; Red Schoendienst; Warren Spahn; Eddie Mathews; Yankees: Casey Stengel (manager); Yogi Berra; Whitey Ford; Mickey Mantle; Enos Slaughter

Broadcast
- Television: NBC
- TV announcers: Mel Allen and Al Helfer
- Radio: NBC
- Radio announcers: Bob Neal and Earl Gillespie

The 1957 World Series was the championship series of Major League Baseball's 1957 season. The 54th edition of the World Series, it was a best-of-seven playoff that matched the American League (AL) champion and defending World Series champion New York Yankees against the National League (NL) champion Milwaukee Braves. After finishing just one game behind the NL champion Brooklyn Dodgers in 1956, the Braves came back in 1957 to win their first pennant since moving from Boston in 1953. The Braves defeated the Yankees in seven games, behind Lew Burdette's three complete game victories, winning their first championship since 1914 (when the team was still based in Boston). This was the first professional sports championship ever won by a Milwaukee-based team.

The series featured the MVPs of both leagues, Mickey Mantle of the Yankees and Hank Aaron of the Braves, facing off for the first time in World Series history. In the decade of the 1950s, the Braves would be the fourth different team and the only non-New York based team to win the World Series. The other 3, the Yankees, Dodgers, and Giants were all based in New York at the time, but at the end of the 1957 season, both the Giants and Dodgers moved west to California for the 1958 season. In the decade of the 1950s, the Yankees won six world championships (1950-53, 56, & 58), the Dodgers won two (1955 in Brooklyn & 59 in Los Angeles), and the Giants (1954) and Braves won only one.

The Yankees had home field advantage in the series. Games 1, 2, 6, and 7 were played at Yankee Stadium, while Milwaukee County Stadium hosted Games 3, 4, and 5. This was the first time since 1946 that the Series included scheduled off days after Games 2 and 5. As of 2026, this is the last seven-game World Series to end at Yankee Stadium.

Of the previous ten World Series, the Yankees had participated in eight of them and won seven. This was also the first World Series since 1948 that a team from New York did not win every game.

This was the first World Series matchup between the Yankees and Braves, and the only Series that was won by the Braves; they lost in 1958, 1996 and 1999, with the last two instances occurring with the Braves based in Atlanta.

Hank Aaron led all regulars with a .393 average and 11 hits, including a triple, three home runs and seven RBI.

Milwaukee’s victory marked the first Wisconsin pro championship won by a team other than the Green Bay Packers. This was the only World Series victory by a team from Milwaukee until 2026.

== Summary ==
Players warming-up at Milwaukee's County Stadium

NL Milwaukee Braves (4) vs. AL New York Yankees (3)

Game	Date	Score	Location	Time	Attendance
1	October 2	Milwaukee Braves – 1, New York Yankees – 3	Yankee Stadium	2:10	69,476
2	October 3	Milwaukee Braves – 4, New York Yankees – 2	Yankee Stadium	2:26	65,202
3	October 5	New York Yankees – 12, Milwaukee Braves – 3	County Stadium	3:18	45,804
4	October 6	New York Yankees – 5, Milwaukee Braves – 7 (10)	County Stadium	2:31	45,804
5	October 7	New York Yankees – 0, Milwaukee Braves – 1	County Stadium	2:00	45,811
6	October 9	Milwaukee Braves – 2, New York Yankees – 3	Yankee Stadium	2:09	61,408
7	October 10	Milwaukee Braves – 5, New York Yankees – 0	Yankee Stadium	2:34	61,207

Note: It was the Braves' first championship since the "Miracle Braves" of 1914.

== Matchups ==
=== Game 1 ===
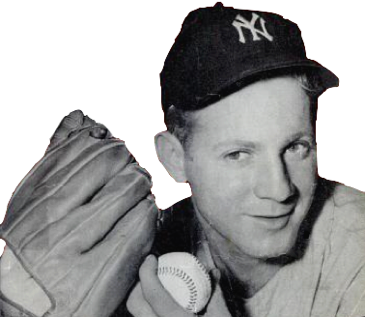
Whitey Ford

October 2, 1957 1:00 pm (ET) at Yankee Stadium in the Bronx, New York
Team	1	2	3	4	5	6	7	8	9	R	H	E
Milwaukee	0	0	0	0	0	0	1	0	0	1	5	0
New York	0	0	0	0	1	2	0	0	X	3	9	1
WP: Whitey Ford (1–0) LP: Warren Spahn (0–1)

In the third inning, the Yankees replaced first baseman Bill Skowron, who was complaining of back pain, with Elston Howard. In the fifth inning the Braves had a runner in scoring position after an error by Howard. The Braves did not manage to capitalize on this opportunity, as second baseman Red Schoendienst grounded out. By the end of the fifth inning, the Braves had left four men on base, with the game still scoreless.

The Yankees broke through that inning with a leadoff single by Jerry Coleman, followed by two ground outs which moved the runner to third base, and then a triple by slugger Hank Bauer made the score 1–0. After three consecutive batters reached first base in the Yankees' half of the sixth inning, and a run scored on Andy Carey's single, Milwaukee manager Fred Haney pulled starter Warren Spahn and replaced him with Ernie Johnson.

The Yankees scored once more in the sixth inning when Coleman executed a squeeze play, allowing Yogi Berra to score from third base. The Braves managed to score only once, when Wes Covington scored in the seventh on a single by Schoendienst. Whitey Ford pitched a complete game for the Yankees.

=== Game 2 ===
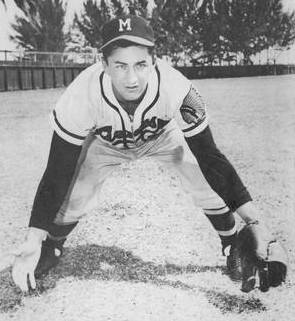
Johnny Logan

October 3, 1957 1:00 pm (ET) at Yankee Stadium in Bronx, New York
Team	1	2	3	4	5	6	7	8	9	R	H	E
Milwaukee	0	1	1	2	0	0	0	0	0	4	8	0
New York	0	1	1	0	0	0	0	0	0	2	7	2
WP: Lew Burdette (1–0) LP: Bobby Shantz (0–1); Home runs: MIL: Johnny Logan (1); NYY: Hank Bauer (1)

Hank Aaron led off the second inning with a triple, then made it safe at home on Joe Adcock's single. The Yankees responded with one of their own in the bottom half of the second. Again in the third inning, the Yankees and Braves each scored one run, leaving the score 2–2 heading to the fourth inning. Both managers were worried about their starting pitchers, and after three straight singles from Adcock, Andy Pafko, and Wes Covington and with two runs in, Yankees manager Casey Stengel replaced Bobby Shantz with reliever Art Ditmar. Ditmar had finished the regular season with an 8–3 record, a 3.25 ERA and six saves.

Ditmar was able to prevent the Braves from scoring any more runs, but the score was 4–2 in favor of the Braves. After that, Braves starter Lew Burdette's pitching improved significantly. He only gave up four hits for the rest of the game, two of them coming in the ninth inning. After a ground out, Tony Kubek singled to right to start things off. Stengel decided to pinch hit lefty Joe Collins, who was 30–for–149 (.201) that year and was playing what turned out to be his final year, for the right-handed Coleman, who was a better 42–for–157 (.263) and also playing in his final season, to face right-handed pitcher Burdette. Collins popped to Johnny Logan at shortstop for the second out. Then, Stengel again opted to pinch hit for the pitcher, Bob Grim. Howard came up in his spot and singled to advance Kubek to second. Bobby Richardson pinch ran for Howard. Burdette recorded the final out as he got Bauer, the next batter, to ground to short, where Logan forced out Richardson.

The Braves' win in Game 2 was the first World Series game won by a non-New York City team since 1948. In every World Series between 1948 and 1957, either both teams were from New York City or a New York City team won in a sweep (1950 and 1954).

=== Game 3 ===
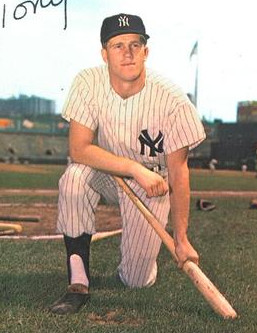
Tony Kubek

October 5, 1957 2:00 pm (CT) at County Stadium in Milwaukee, Wisconsin
Team	1	2	3	4	5	6	7	8	9	R	H	E
New York	3	0	2	2	0	0	5	0	0	12	9	0
Milwaukee	0	1	0	0	2	0	0	0	0	3	8	1
WP: Don Larsen (1–0) LP: Bob Buhl (0–1); Home runs: NYY: Tony Kubek 2 (2), Mickey Mantle (1); MIL: Hank Aaron (1)

New York's Tony Kubek began the scoring with a one-out solo homer in the first inning. After that, things quickly fell apart for Bob Buhl, who had pitched quite well in the regular season (18–7, 2.74 ERA). He walked Mickey Mantle and Yogi Berra, then made an error attempting to pick Mantle off at second base. After a sacrifice fly by Gil McDougald and a single by first baseman Harry Simpson, manager Fred Haney pulled Buhl and brought in rookie Juan Pizarro. Pizarro got the final out in the first inning, and followed that with a solid second inning. In the third inning, however, the Yankees began to capitalize on their lead. After allowing hits from Mantle, Berra and Jerry Lumpe, and a walk to Elston Howard, who was pinch-hitting for Harry Simpson, Pizarro was removed from the game. Gene Conley was called in to finish the inning. He did get the last two outs, but gave up a two-run home run to Mantle in the fourth inning.

By the bottom of the fifth inning, the score was 7–1 in favor of the Yankees. Logan led off with a single, and Eddie Mathews flied to left. Hank Aaron hit one of his three postseason homers to make the game 7–3. After a Covington walk, Joe Adcock and Bob Hazle each made outs to end the fifth. Yankees relief pitcher Don Larsen had his comfortable lead cut down to just four runs.

In the seventh inning the Yankees secured their lead with a five-run inning against reliever Bob Trowbridge. The five runs started with a two-run bases-loaded single by Bauer and a three-run home run by Kubek. The score was 12–3 heading into the bottom of the seventh.

There was only one more hit the rest of the game, a single by Aaron in the ninth. Del Crandall made the last out and the series was on to Game 4 with the Yankees up 2–1. Left fielder Kubek was only the second rookie in history to hit two home runs in a World Series game. This was the first World Series game played in the state of Wisconsin.

=== Game 4 ===
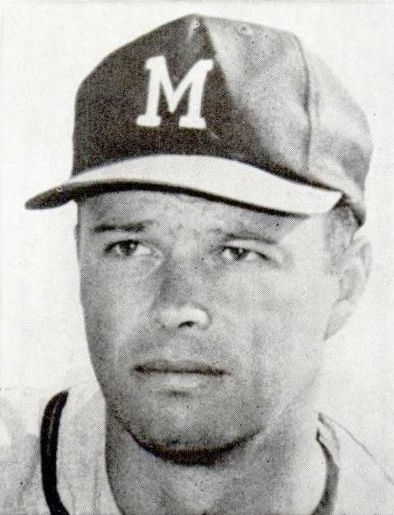
Eddie Mathews

October 6, 1957 2:00 pm (CT) at County Stadium in Milwaukee, Wisconsin
Team	1	2	3	4	5	6	7	8	9	10	R	H	E
New York	1	0	0	0	0	0	0	0	3	1	5	11	0
Milwaukee	0	0	0	4	0	0	0	0	0	3	7	7	0
WP: Warren Spahn (1–1) LP: Bob Grim (0–1); Home runs: NYY: Elston Howard (1); MIL: Hank Aaron (2), Frank Torre (1), Eddie Mathews (1)

After a game with two homers and four RBIs, Tony Kubek led off the first inning for the Yankees, laying down a bunt which ultimately led to a run after Mickey Mantle reached on a fielder's choice, Yogi Berra walked, and Gil McDougald singled.

The second inning started with a single by Hank Aaron and then a stolen base by Wes Covington, but they could not convert. The fourth inning began with a walk to Johnny Logan. Eddie Mathews doubled to right field, which sent Logan to third. Aaron then hit a three-run home run which completely cleared the stadium. The next batter, Covington, grounded out. This was followed by a shot off the bat of Frank Torre, a part-time first baseman who was giving Joe Adcock a day off. The Braves were then up 4–1 against Yankees starter Tom Sturdivant.

The next four innings for the Yankees were plagued by double plays. Warren Spahn was getting ground out after ground out and the Yankees looked helpless until the ninth. With two outs and a three-run deficit in the top of the ninth, New York found new life in two back-to-back singles. Spahn gave up one to Berra, followed by one to McDougald. With two runners on, Howard hit a three-run homer to tie the game.

Left-handed Tommy Byrne had replaced right-handed Johnny Kucks in the eighth inning for New York. This prompted Haney to pinch hit Adcock for Torre. Adcock grounded to shortstop and Milwaukee went 1–2–3 that inning. The game thus went on to extra innings.

Milwaukee starter Spahn came out for the tenth. Kubek got his second hit in the top of the tenth, followed by a triple by Hank Bauer to score a run. After Mantle flied to right, the Braves got ready for the bottom of the tenth down one. Spahn was due up first for the Braves, and Haney opted to pinch hit with Nippy Jones, who had played in just 30 games that year. In what turned out to be his final appearance, Jones was part of a pivotal play in the inning. A wild Tommy Byrne pitch bounced near Jones, but umpire Donatelli initially called a ball. After an argument hinging on a spot of shoe polish on the baseball, Jones convinced umpire Augie Donatelli that he was hit on the shoe.

The inning continued with Felix Mantilla running for Jones. Red Schoendienst hit a sacrifice bunt to advance Mantilla, who scored the tying run on a double by Logan. Mathews followed with a towering two-run home run to win it for the Braves, 7–5, and tied the series at two games apiece.

=== Game 5 ===
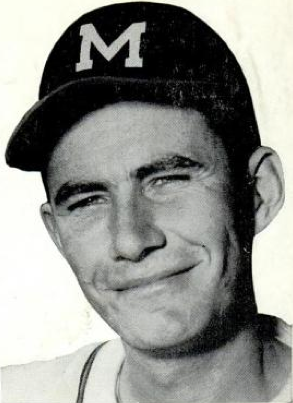
Joe Adcock

October 7, 1957 2:00 pm (CT) at County Stadium in Milwaukee, Wisconsin
Team	1	2	3	4	5	6	7	8	9	R	H	E
New York	0	0	0	0	0	0	0	0	0	0	7	0
Milwaukee	0	0	0	0	0	1	0	0	X	1	6	1
WP: Lew Burdette (2–0) LP: Whitey Ford (1–1)

With the opposing teams' top pitchers, Whitey Ford and Lew Burdette, facing each other, Game 5 was expected to be a low-scoring affair. However, the game started out with the Yankees looking to score in the first inning. After a leadoff single by Hank Bauer and a sacrifice bunt by Tony Kubek, Gil McDougald hit a line drive that turned into the second out of the inning. Yogi Berra then grounded out. After that, Burdette only allowed multiple Yankee baserunners in the fourth inning.

At the start of the sixth inning, the game was still scoreless. In the bottom of the sixth with two outs and nobody on, Eddie Mathews, Hank Aaron, and Joe Adcock singled, scoring Mathews and giving the Braves a 1–0 lead that held up for the rest of the game.

The Yankees' best scoring chance came in the eighth inning after a hit by Jerry Coleman to right field. Mickey Mantle came in to pinch-run for Coleman, but was caught stealing at second base by catcher Del Crandall. Ford was then taken out and Yankee reliever Bob Turley came in, striking out two batters while giving up no hits in the inning.

Yogi Berra made the last Yankee out in the 1–0 complete-game by Burdette, and the Milwaukee Braves took the series lead three games to two.

=== Game 6 ===
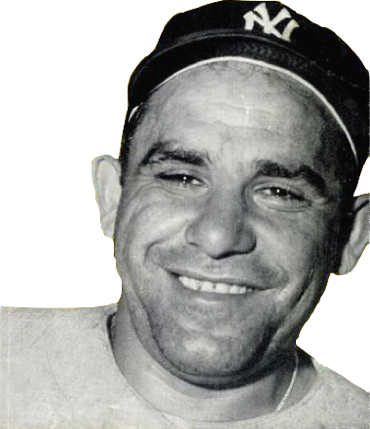
Yogi Berra

October 9, 1957 1:00 pm (ET) at Yankee Stadium in Bronx, New York
Team	1	2	3	4	5	6	7	8	9	R	H	E
Milwaukee	0	0	0	0	1	0	1	0	0	2	4	0
New York	0	0	2	0	0	0	1	0	X	3	7	0
WP: Bob Turley (1–0) LP: Ernie Johnson (0–1); Home runs: MIL: Frank Torre (2), Hank Aaron (3); NYY: Yogi Berra (1), Hank Bauer (2)

Bob Buhl started for the Braves but did not last very long. In the first two innings, no one scored, although there were some opportunities, including the Yankees' first inning when Enos Slaughter reached third and Yogi Berra got to second on Buhl's wild pitch. Buhl struck out Gil McDougald to end the inning.

In the bottom of the third, the Yankees scored two runs to take the lead on a Berra two-run homer, scoring Slaughter. After that Ernie Johnson replaced Buhl. Johnson then held the Yankees scoreless until the seventh inning.

The Braves cut the lead in their half in the fifth on Frank Torre's home run, his second of the series. The Braves then tied it in the top of the seventh with a homer by Hank Aaron, his third. The game was now tied and Braves' pitcher Johnson was holding the Yankees to just one hit in 3 1/3 innings. Leading off the seventh, pitcher Bob Turley was out on a bunt attempt with two strikes. Then, right fielder Hank Bauer hit a home run off the left-field foul pole to give the Yankees a one-run lead.

In the Braves' ninth, after an Eddie Mathews walk, Turley got lefty Wes Covington to ground into a 1–6–3 double play to end the game and force a deciding Game 7.

=== Game 7 ===
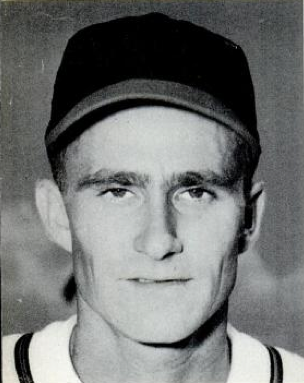
Lew Burdette

October 10, 1957 1:00 pm (ET) at Yankee Stadium in Bronx, New York
Team	1	2	3	4	5	6	7	8	9	R	H	E
Milwaukee	0	0	4	0	0	0	0	1	0	5	9	1
New York	0	0	0	0	0	0	0	0	0	0	7	3
WP: Lew Burdette (3–0) LP: Don Larsen (1–1); Home runs: MIL: Del Crandall (1); NYY: None

Lew Burdette was called in to start game 7 for the Braves on two days' rest when the expected starter, Warren Spahn, was struck with the Asian flu.

After two scoreless innings, the Braves broke through in the third, started by a Bob Hazle single and an error by Tony Kubek at third base; one of three Yankee errors in the game. The inning continued with a hard-hit Eddie Mathews double, which prompted Casey Stengel to take out starter Don Larsen and bring in lefty Bobby Shantz. Shantz then gave up an RBI single to Hank Aaron and a single by Wes Covington advanced Aaron to third. Frank Torre grounded into a fielders' choice which scored Aaron. Felix Mantilla then flied to Hank Bauer in right to end the inning, ending the Braves' scoring at four runs.

The Yankees' best chance came in the sixth, when they had runners on first and second with two outs after a Mickey Mantle single and an error by Mathews at third. Gil McDougald then grounded out forcing Mantle at third to end the inning and the threat.

In the ninth, after Milwaukee made it 5–0 on a Del Crandall homer, the Yankees attempted to mount a rally. With two outs and McDougald on first base, Jerry Coleman singled to right. Then, Tommy Byrne singled to load the bases for Bill Skowron. With the tying run on deck, Burdette retired Skowron on a ground out to third with Mathews making the final out which secured the world championship for the Braves.

In the game, the Yankees were limited to seven hits and one walk. Burdette was named the Series MVP after pitching three complete games and two shutouts while recording 13 strikeouts, two earned runs off 21 hits, and a 0.67 ERA. He was the first pitcher since Christy Mathewson to pitch two shutouts in a World Series.

Despite the Yankees having made 17 more appearances in the World Series since this one, this game, to date, is the most recent time the team has hosted a World Series Game 7.

Following the death of Art Schallock in 2025, this is the earliest World Series from which a player is still living. (John DeMerit, Tony Kubek, Bobby Richardson, and Bobby Shantz)

== Composite line score ==
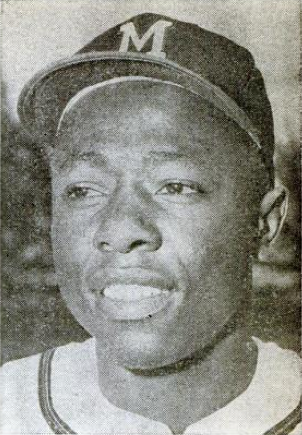
Hank Aaron clinched the NL pennant by hitting a walk-off home run on September 23. In the Fall Classic, Aaron batted .393 with 3 home runs.

1957 World Series (4–3): Milwaukee Braves (N.L.) over New York Yankees (A.L.)

Team	1	2	3	4	5	6	7	8	9	10	R	H	E
Milwaukee Braves	0	2	5	6	3	1	2	1	0	3	23	47	3
New York Yankees	4	1	5	2	1	2	6	0	3	1	25	57	6
Total attendance: 394,712 Average attendance: 56,387; Winning player's share: $8,924 Losing player's share: $5,606

=== MVP Lew Burdette's series statistics ===
- Games – 3
- Games started – 3
- ERA – 0.67
- Wins – 3
- Loses – 0
- Hits – 21
- Complete games – 3
- Shutouts – 2
- Innings pitched – 27 (3 complete games)
- Earned runs – 2 (both in Game 2)
- Strikeouts – 13
- Walks – 4

== See also ==
- 1957 Japan Series
