= Red Munger =

American baseball player (1918–1996)

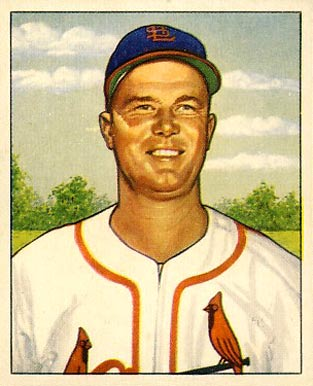
- Pitcher
- Born: October 4, 1918; Houston, Texas, U.S.
- Died: July 23, 1996 (aged 77); Houston, Texas, U.S.
- Batted: Right Threw: Right

MLB debut
- May 1, 1943, for the St. Louis Cardinals

Last MLB appearance
- September 23, 1956, for the Pittsburgh Pirates

MLB statistics
- Win–loss record: 77–56
- Earned run average: 3.83
- Strikeouts: 564
- Stats at Baseball Reference

Teams
- St. Louis Cardinals (1943–1944, 1946–1952); Pittsburgh Pirates (1952, 1956)

Career highlights and awards
- 3× All-Star (1944, 1947, 1949); World Series champion (1946)

George David "Red" Munger (October 4, 1918 – July 23, 1996) was an American professional baseball player, a right-handed pitcher who spent a decade in Major League Baseball for the St. Louis Cardinals (1943–44; 1946–52) and Pittsburgh Pirates (1952; 1956). The native of Houston, Texas, stood 6 feet 2 inches (1.88 m) tall and weighed 200 pounds (91 kg).

Munger pitched a complete game, 12–3 victory over the Boston Red Sox in Game 4 of the 1946 World Series at Fenway Park. He gave up nine hits, including a home run by future Hall of Famer Bobby Doerr, but only one run was earned. Munger's victory in his only World Series appearance was the only Cardinal win not registered by teammate Harry Brecheen, whose three triumphs propelled the Redbirds to a seven-game World Series championship over the Red Sox.

A three-time National League All-Star, Munger worked in 273 regular-season Major League games during his career, winning 77 and losing 56 (.583) with an earned run average of 3.83. He struck out 564 batters in 1,228 2/3 innings pitched. In 1944, he won 11 of 14 decisions in 21 games, 12 as a starter, with a 1.34 earned run average. He entered the United States Army for World War II service during the middle of that campaign, and did not qualify for the National League's ERA title. He also missed the 1944 World Series, which delivered another Cardinal championship.

Munger took a regular turn in the Cardinal starting rotation from mid-1946 through 1950, then was traded to the Pirates in May 1952. Pittsburgh sent Munger to their top minor league affiliate, the Hollywood Stars of the Pacific Coast League, and he responded with 17- and 23-win seasons in 1954–55. During the latter year, at age 36, he registered 25 complete games and an ERA of 1.85. The standout season brought Munger to the Major Leagues for one last campaign, as a relief pitcher and occasional starter for the 1956 Pirates. All told, as a minor leaguer, Munger won 152 games; as a professional, he compiled a 229–174 (.568) record during a career that stretched from 1937 to 1958.

Munger died of a heart attack on July 23, 1996 in Houston, Texas at age 77. He was supposed to attend a 50th reunion of the 1946 World Series team later on in 1996 in St. Louis.

== See also ==
- List of St. Louis Cardinals team records
