= Bob Hazle =

American baseball player (1930–1992)

- Outfielder
- Born: December 9, 1930; Laurens, South Carolina, U.S.
- Died: April 25, 1992 (aged 61); Columbia, South Carolina, U.S.
- Batted: Left Threw: Right

MLB debut
- September 8, 1955, for the Cincinnati Redlegs

Last MLB appearance
- September 28, 1958, for the Detroit Tigers

MLB statistics
- Batting average: .310
- Home runs: 9
- Runs batted in: 37
- Stats at Baseball Reference

Teams
- Cincinnati Redlegs (1955); Milwaukee Braves (1957–1958); Detroit Tigers (1958)

Career highlights and awards
- World Series champion (1957)

Robert Sydney "Hurricane" Hazle (December 9, 1930 – April 25, 1992) was an American professional baseball player. He was an outfielder over parts of three Major League seasons (1955; 1957–1958) with the Cincinnati Redlegs, Milwaukee Braves and Detroit Tigers. Hazle was a member of the 1957 World Series champion Braves. For his Major League career, he hit .310 with 9 home runs and 37 runs batted in in 110 games played.

Hazle was born in Laurens, South Carolina. He batted left-handed, threw right-handed, and was listed as 6 feet (1.8 m) tall and 190 pounds (86 kg). He attended Wofford College and signed with Cincinnati in 1950.

== Professional career ==
Hazle debuted with the Redlegs late in the 1955 season. He told reporters that Redlegs manager Birdie Tebbetts said he would be splitting time with Frank Robinson in the outfield but he only got into six games. The following spring, he was traded with Corky Valentine to the Milwaukee Braves in return for George Crowe, but did not appear in the big leagues.

Playing for the Triple-A Wichita Braves, he was hurt and reportedly considered quitting the sport.

Hazle was promoted from Wichita on July 27 to serve as a backup to star outfielder Andy Pafko after Braves outfielder Billy Bruton suffered an injury. Pafko, who served as a mentor to Hazle, noted that Hazle had the strongest wrists he had ever seen other than Hank Aaron's.

In less than three weeks, from August 9 through August 25, Hazle batted .473 with 5 home runs and 19 runs batted in during 14 games. Hazle's sudden an unexpected burst of offense earned him the nickname "Hurricane." The original Hurricane Hazel had killed hundreds of people in North America in 1954. In 41 regular-season games with the Braves, Hazle batted .403 with 12 doubles, 7 home runs, and 27 RBI.

The first-place Braves swept the second-place Cardinals on August 9–11, which went a long way towards sealing the National League pennant for Milwaukee; the first two games of the series were blowouts, and Hazle had seven hits and five runs batted in. He batted .556 in his first dozen games. For the season, Hazle batted .403 in 41 games, with 7 home runs and 27 runs batted in. On the next-to-last day of the season, Hazle broke up a no-hit bid by Cincinnati's Johnny Klippstein with a two-out, eighth-inning single.

Hazle appeared in four of seven World Series games that year, hitting .154 for the champion Braves. However, both of his hits came in the seventh and deciding game; Hazle scored the first run in a 5–0 victory. Despite having had just 134 at-bats, Hazle finished fourth in the 1957 NL Rookie of the Year voting. On his unexpected popularity in Milwaukee for his role in the Braves’ championship season, teammate Johnny Logan said Hazle "could’ve run for mayor."

== Later career ==
Hazle was hit in the head with a pitch in spring training 1958, from which he struggled to recover. After a bad start in 1958, Hazle was traded to Detroit. After a stint in the minors, he retired in 1960.

Hazle died of a heart attack at his home in Columbia, South Carolina at the age of 61.
