= Nippy Jones =

American baseball player (1925–1995)

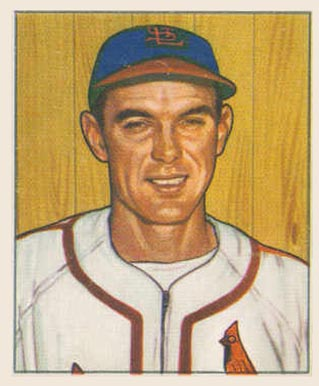
- First baseman
- Born: June 29, 1925; Los Angeles, California, U.S.
- Died: October 3, 1995 (aged 70); Sacramento, California, U.S.
- Batted: Right Threw: Right

MLB debut
- June 8, 1946, for the St. Louis Cardinals

Last MLB appearance
- September 29, 1957, for the Milwaukee Braves

MLB statistics
- Batting average: .267
- Home runs: 25
- Runs batted in: 209
- Stats at Baseball Reference

Teams
- St. Louis Cardinals (1946–1951); Philadelphia Phillies (1952); Milwaukee Braves (1957)

Career highlights and awards
- 2× World Series champion (1946, 1957)

Vernal Leroy "Nippy" Jones (June 29, 1925 – October 3, 1995) was an American professional baseball first baseman. He played in Major League Baseball (MLB) for three National League clubs during the 1940s and 1950s, and won World Series rings with the St. Louis Cardinals in 1946 and the Milwaukee Braves in 1957. He threw and batted right-handed, stood 6 feet 1 inch (1.85 m) tall and weighed 185 pounds (84 kg).

== St. Louis Cardinals ==
Jones was born in Los Angeles, and signed with the Cardinals upon graduation from John C. Fremont High School in Inglewood, California, in 1943. After batting .304 for the Cardinals' Pacific Coast League affiliate Sacramento Solons in 1943, Jones left baseball for two years in order to serve in the United States Marine Corps during World War II.

He returned in 1946, spending most of the season with the Cardinals' triple A affiliate Rochester Red Wings. However, he did appear in sixteen games with the Cardinals, and was on their post-season roster. He struck out in his only plate appearance of the 1946 World Series against the Boston Red Sox in game five.

He split 1947 between St. Louis and Rochester before earning a starting job with the Cards in 1948. Having originally come up with the Cardinals as a second baseman, he played first base for the 1948 Cardinals, with future Hall of Famer Stan Musial shifting to the outfield. He batted .254 with ten home runs and 81 runs batted in in his first full season for the second place Cardinals.

== Sacramento Solons ==
Jones remained with the Cardinals through 1951. Following the season, he was selected by the Philadelphia Phillies in the rule 5 draft. He appeared in only eight games for the Phillies in 1952, spending most of the season with their triple A affiliate, the Baltimore Orioles.

He returned to the Sacramento Solons in 1953, who were at that point, unaffiliated. He remained with the club through the beginning of the 1957 season. The Milwaukee Braves were in second place behind the Cardinals, and purchased Jones' contract when slugging first baseman Joe Adcock went down with an injury.

== 1957 World Series and shoe polish incident ==
The highlight of his season occurred on July 26, when he hit a walk off home run in the eleventh inning to lift the Braves to a 6–3 victory over the New York Giants. After finishing second to the Brooklyn Dodgers two years in a row, the Braves won the National League in 1957, and faced the New York Yankees in the World Series.

Jones is remembered for being involved in a shoe polish incident in the 1957 Fall Classic. He pinch hit in Games 1 and 3, grounding out both times. Both of those games were won by the Yankees. Game 4 went into extra innings, and when the Yankees took a 5–4 lead in the tenth, the Braves were looking at the possibility of falling three games to one in the series.

Jones led off the Milwaukee half of the tenth inning, pinch hitting for Warren Spahn. He jumped back from a low pitch that home plate umpire Augie Donatelli called a ball. Jones protested that it had hit his foot, and he was awarded first base after showing Donatelli a shoe polish mark on the ball to prove it. Yankees manager Casey Stengel vehemently protested the call, but to no avail. The Braves scored three runs in the tenth, including a two-run home run by Eddie Mathews to end the game and even the series at two games apiece. The play was the turning point in the series, as the Braves went on to win the series in seven games.

A similar incident would be repeated twelve years later by Cleon Jones of the New York Mets in Game 5 of the 1969 World Series.

== Personal ==
After the 1957 World Series, Jones returned to the Sacramento Solons, and remained with them until 1959. He spent one season with the Portland Beavers before retiring in 1960.

Following his retirement from baseball, Jones worked in public relations and title-insurance businesses in Sacramento, California, and became a professional fishing guide.

Jones died due to a heart attack on October 3, 1995. He was survived by his wife of 49 years, Nora, four children and six grandchildren.
