= Howie Pollet =

American baseball player (1921–1974)

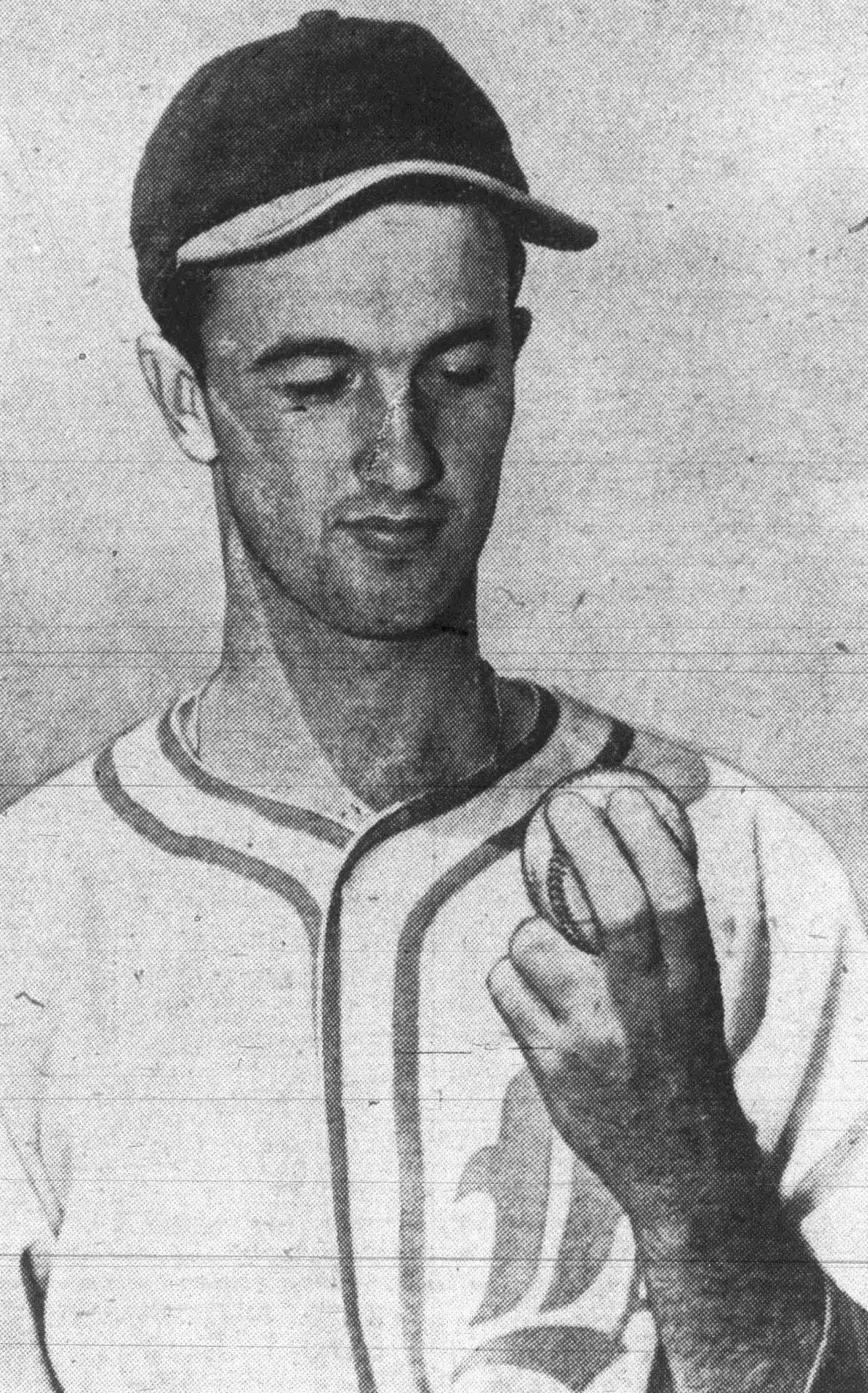
- Pollet, circa 1941
- Pitcher
- Born: June 26, 1921; New Orleans, Louisiana, U.S.
- Died: August 8, 1974 (aged 53); Houston, Texas, U.S.
- Batted: Left Threw: Left

MLB debut
- August 20, 1941, for the St. Louis Cardinals

Last MLB appearance
- September 23, 1956, for the Pittsburgh Pirates

MLB statistics
- Win–loss record: 131–116
- Earned run average: 3.51
- Strikeouts: 934
- Stats at Baseball Reference

Teams
- St. Louis Cardinals (1941–1943, 1946–1951); Pittsburgh Pirates (1951–1953); Chicago Cubs (1953–1955); Chicago White Sox (1956); Pittsburgh Pirates (1956)

Career highlights and awards
- 3× All-Star (1943, 1946, 1949); 3× World Series champion (1942, 1946 1964); NL wins leader (1946); NL ERA leader (1946)

Howard Joseph Pollet (June 26, 1921 – August 8, 1974) was an American left-handed pitcher in Major League Baseball during the 1940s and 1950s. A three-time All-Star in 1943, 1946 and 1949, he twice led the National League in earned run average (1.75 in 1943 and 2.10 in 1946).

== Stellar minor league career ==
Born in New Orleans, Pollet signed his first professional contract with the St. Louis Cardinals, and it was as a Cardinal that he achieved his greatest success. In 1941, he won 20 of 23 decisions and led the Class A1 Texas League in ERA (1.16) and strikeouts (151) as a member of the Houston Buffaloes. This performance earned Pollet a promotion to the Cards that season: as a rookie, he won 5 and lost 2, with an ERA of 1.93. He missed the 1944–45 seasons while serving in the United States Army Air Forces in the Pacific Theater of Operations during World War II.

== Ace left-hander for postwar Cardinals ==
Pollet returned to baseball in 1946, and promptly played a major role in the Redbirds' National League pennant and world title. In addition to topping the NL in earned-run average, he led the league in wins (21) (losing ten) and innings pitched (266). When the Cardinals finished in a tie for the pennant with the Brooklyn Dodgers at the close of the regular season, he was chosen by manager Eddie Dyer to start Game 1 of the best-of-three National League playoff on October 1. Pollet hurled a complete game, 4–2 victory in the opener, and the Cardinals wrapped up the league title by easily winning Game 2 behind Murry Dickson. Pollet started two games of the 1946 World Series against the Boston Red Sox, and lost his only decision, posting an ERA of 3.48 in 12 1/3 innings pitched.

In 1949 Pollet posted a 20–9 mark and led the NL in shutouts with five. That year, however, St. Louis finished second to Brooklyn by one game.

Pollet was traded to the Pittsburgh Pirates on June 15, 1951, and thereafter struggled to post a winning record. During his 14-year career, he won 131 and lost 116 (.530) with a career ERA of 3.51. As a Cardinal (1941–43; 1946–51), his record was 97–65; as a member of the Pirates, Chicago Cubs and Chicago White Sox (1951–56), he won 34 and lost 51. Altogether, he worked in 403 Major League games pitched and 2,107 1/3 innings pitched; he gave up 2,096 hits and 745 bases on balls with 934 strikeouts.

As a hitter, Pollet posted a .185 batting average (129-for-698) with 54 runs, 48 RBI and 55 bases on balls. Defensively, he recorded a .960 fielding percentage.

== Pitching coach ==
Pollet returned to the field in 1959 as the Cardinals' pitching coach, serving through 1964. In his last season there, the Cards won their seventh world championship. He then moved back to his adopted city of Houston in 1965, working as the pitching coach of the Astros for one season.

Pollet was a business partner of his former manager, Dyer, in insurance, real estate and energy companies in Houston. He retired from baseball and resumed his business career after the 1965 season, and died from adenocarcinoma in Houston at age 53 in 1974.

== See also ==
- List of Major League Baseball annual ERA leaders
- List of Major League Baseball annual wins leaders
- List of St. Louis Cardinals team records
- List of St. Louis Cardinals coaches

Sporting positions
Preceded by Al Hollingsworth	St. Louis Cardinals pitching coach 1959–1964	Succeeded by Joe Becker
Preceded by Cot Deal	Houston Astros pitching coach 1965	Succeeded by Gordon Jones
