= Erv Dusak =

American baseball player (1920–1994)

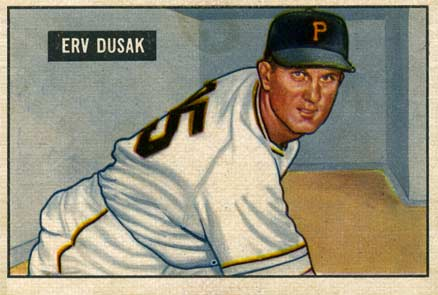
- Outfielder / Infielder / Pitcher
- Born: July 29, 1920; Chicago, Illinois, U.S.
- Died: November 6, 1994 (aged 74); Glendale Heights, Illinois, U.S.
- Batted: Right Threw: Right

MLB debut
- September 18, 1941, for the St. Louis Cardinals

Last MLB appearance
- June 15, 1952, for the Pittsburgh Pirates

MLB statistics
- Batting average: .243
- Home runs: 24
- Runs batted in: 106
- Win–loss record: 0–3
- Earned run average: 5.33
- Strikeouts: 26
- Stats at Baseball Reference

Teams
- St. Louis Cardinals (1941–1942, 1946–1951); Pittsburgh Pirates (1951–1952)

Career highlights and awards
- World Series champion (1946)

Ervin Frank "Four Sack" Dusak (July 29, 1920 – November 6, 1994) was an American professional baseball outfielder, infielder and pitcher in Major League Baseball over nine seasons spanning 1941 to 1952 for the St. Louis Cardinals and Pittsburgh Pirates. Born in Chicago, he threw and batted right-handed, stood 6 feet 2 inches (1.88 m) tall and weighed 185 pounds (84 kg).

Dusak signed with the Cardinals' organization in 1938 and got his nickname from a poem a fan wrote after he hit a home run for their Class D minor league team, the Monett Red Birds. He spent the 1941 season among three Cardinal farm clubs: the Class B Mobile Shippers, Class A1 Houston Buffaloes (who won 103 games), and the top-level Rochester Red Wings, batting a composite .318 with 23 long balls. He earned cups of coffee in the majors with the Cards in 1941 and 1942, and missed the 1943 to 1945 seasons while serving in the United States Army in the Pacific Theater of World War II.

Dusak then returned to the Cardinals from 1946 to 1951, primarily as an outfielder, playing some games at second base and third base. On July 7, 1946, he hit a game-winning, three-run home run to beat the Brooklyn Dodgers and to move his club within a half game of the National League lead. Brooklyn and St. Louis would finish the 1946 regular-season in a dead heat, forcing a tie-breaker series that delivered the Cardinals' ninth pennant since 1926. Dusak played a key role in the clinching second game of the series, hitting a triple and an RBI single to help propel the Redbirds to the 8–4 triumph. They went on to win the World Series, with Dusak appearing in four Fall Classic games, getting four at bats, and hitting a double in Game 2.

Dusak saw his most big league action in 1947, hitting .284 in 111 games. When his batting average dropped, he turned to pitching, appearing in 23 games, all in relief, but ended his career primarily as a position player with the Pittsburgh Pirates. In 413 MLB games played over all or part of nine major-league seasons, Dusak batted .243; his 251 hits included 32 doubles, six triples and 24 homers, with 106 RBI. He drew walks well, with a lifetime .334 on-base percentage that was 91 points higher than his batting average. On the mound, he posted an 0–3 won–lost record and 5.33 earned run average; in 54 innings pitched, he allowed 51 hits and 44 walks, with 26 strikeouts.

After retiring in 1952, Dusak was an agent for 21 years for Metropolitan Life Insurance Company and worked in a bowling alley for a decade. Dursak died at his son's home in Glendale Heights, Illinois on November 6, 1994.
