= Ted Wilks =

American baseball player (1915–1989)

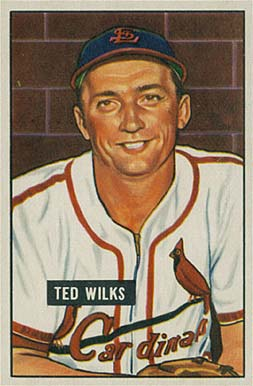
- Pitcher
- Born: November 13, 1915; Fulton, New York, U.S.
- Died: August 21, 1989 (aged 73); Houston, Texas, U.S.
- Batted: Right Threw: Right

MLB debut
- April 25, 1944, for the St. Louis Cardinals

Last MLB appearance
- August 5, 1953, for the Cleveland Indians

MLB statistics
- Win–loss record: 59–30
- Earned run average: 3.26
- Strikeouts: 403
- Saves: 46
- Stats at Baseball Reference

Teams
- St. Louis Cardinals (1944–1951); Pittsburgh Pirates (1951–1952); Cleveland Indians (1952–1953)

Career highlights and awards
- 2× World Series champion (1944, 1946)

Theodore Wilks (November 13, 1915 – August 21, 1989) was an American professional baseball player. Born in Fulton, New York, he was a right-handed pitcher who appeared in 385 games in Major League Baseball over ten seasons (1944–53) as a member of the St. Louis Cardinals, Pittsburgh Pirates and Cleveland Indians. He was listed as 5 feet 9 inches (1.75 m) tall and 178 pounds (81 kg).

In his major-league career, Wilks compiled a 59–30 record in his 385 appearances, 341 of them as a relief pitcher, with a 3.26 earned run average and 46 saves, 22 complete games and five shutouts. In 913 innings pitched, he allowed 832 hits and 283 bases on balls. He racked up 403 strikeouts. As a Cardinal, he was a member of two World Series championship teams, defeating the St. Louis Browns in 1944 and the Boston Red Sox in 1946. In World Series play, he compiled an 0–1 record in three appearances, with a 4.91 earned run average and seven strikeouts.

== Baseball career ==
Wilks was a 28-year-old rookie pitcher in 1944. He beat the Cincinnati Reds 3–0 on August 29, for his eleventh victory in a row. Wilks took a no-hitter into the eighth inning, prior to Frank McCormick hitting for a single. It was one of three Cincinnati hits. Wilks concluded the 1944 season with a 17–4 record and a 2.65 earned run average.

Following his impressive rookie season, Wilks encountered arm problems which limited his effectiveness. However, he became an important pitcher in the Cardinal bullpen in the post-World War II era and twice (1949; 1951) led the National League in saves, although the save was not yet an official MLB statistic. Cardinal catcher Joe Garagiola nicknamed Wilks "The Cork" because he was their "stopper" out of the bullpen. By the conclusion of the 1947 campaign, Wilks had compiled a career record of 33–11.

Wilks had a reputation as a pitcher for regularly throwing at the heads of black batters. While pitching with the Cardinals in 1947, he attempted to organize a boycott so as not to have to play a desegregated Brooklyn Dodgers with Jackie Robinson.

After his pitching career ended, Wilks turned to coaching. He served in the farm systems of the Indians and the Milwaukee Braves, then spent two years coaching in the American League with the 1960 Indians and the 1961 Kansas City Athletics. In 1960, he was involved in a fight with pitcher Mudcat Grant, triggered by Wilks's racist comments. Following a dispute over the national anthem, Wilks told Grant, who was black, that "If we catch your nigger ass in Texas, we’re going to hang you from the nearest tree", leading Grant to punch Wilks. Following that incident, Wilks was sent down to the farm leagues.

Wilks died in Houston, Texas from stomach cancer on August 21, 1989, where he had played minor league baseball for the Houston Buffaloes in the early 1940s, at the age of 73.

== See also ==
- List of Major League Baseball annual saves leaders
