= Marty Marion =

American baseball player and manager (1917–2011)

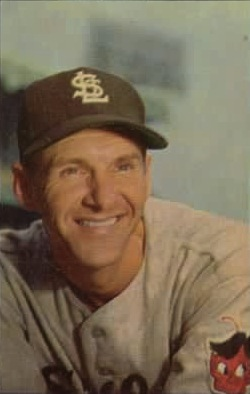
- Marion with the St. Louis Browns c. 1953
- Shortstop / Manager
- Born: December 1, 1917; Richburg, South Carolina, U.S.
- Died: March 15, 2011 (aged 93); Ladue, Missouri, U.S.
- Batted: Right Threw: Right

MLB debut
- April 16, 1940, for the St. Louis Cardinals

Last MLB appearance
- July 6, 1953, for the St. Louis Browns

MLB statistics
- Batting average: .263
- Home runs: 36
- Runs batted in: 624
- Managerial record: 356–372
- Winning %: .489
- Stats at Baseball Reference

Teams
- As player: St. Louis Cardinals (1940–1950); St. Louis Browns (1952–1953); As manager: St. Louis Cardinals (1951); St. Louis Browns (1952–1953); Chicago White Sox (1954–1956)

Career highlights and awards
- 8× All-Star (1943–1950); 3× World Series champion (1942, 1944, 1946); NL MVP (1944); St. Louis Cardinals Hall of Fame

Martin Whiteford Marion (December 1, 1917 – March 15, 2011), nicknamed "Slats", "the Octopus", and "Mr. Shortstop", was an American professional baseball shortstop and manager. He played 13 seasons in Major League Baseball (MLB) for the St. Louis Cardinals and St. Louis Browns from 1940 to 1953. He was a defensive stalwart of the Cardinals' dynasty in the 1940s, which saw them win three World Series in a five year span, and was named the National League MVP in 1944, the first shortstop in the history of the National League to win the award. Marion managed the Cardinals in 1951, the Browns from 1952 to 1953, and the Chicago White Sox from 1954 to 1956.

== Baseball career ==
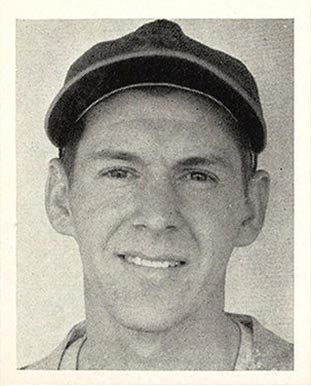
Marion in 1941

Marion was born in Richburg, South Carolina. He grew up in Atlanta, where he attended Tech High School and played baseball for the Georgia Tech Yellow Jackets. His older brother, Red Marion, was briefly an outfielder in the American League and a long-time manager in the minor leagues. Nicknamed "Slats", Marion had unusually long arms which reached for grounders like tentacles, prompting sportswriters to call him "The Octopus". A childhood leg injury deferred him from military service in World War II.

From 1940 to 1950, Marion led the National League shortstops in fielding percentage four times, despite several other players being moved around the infield during these years. In 1941 he played all 154 games at shortstop (also a league-high) and in 1947 he made only 15 errors for a consistent .981 percentage.

Marion was also a better-than-average hitter for a shortstop. His most productive season came in 1942, when he hit .276 with a league-leading 38 doubles. In the 1942 World Series, one of four series in which he participated with the Cardinals, he helped his team to a World Championship. In 1943 he batted a career-high .280 in the regular season and hit .357 in the 1943 World Series.

He played with many second basemen throughout his career, including Frank "Creepy" Crespi. Marion commented after the 1941 season that Crespi's play was the best he ever saw by a second baseman. Crespi once took on Joe Medwick on the field (during a game) when he was trying to intimidate Marion. They remained friends until Crespi's death in 1990.

Marion's playing career was interrupted in 1951 by knee and back injuries. That season, he succeeded Eddie Dyer as manager of the Cardinals, leading them to an 80–73 record and a third place finish, but was replaced by Eddie Stanky at the end of 1951. He then moved to the American League Browns as a player-coach, and took the reins from Rogers Hornsby on June 10, 1952, as their player-manager. The last pilot in St. Louis Browns history, he was let go after the 1953 season when the Browns moved to Baltimore as the Orioles. He then signed as a coach for the White Sox for the 1954 campaign and was promoted to manager that September, when skipper Paul Richards left Chicago to take on the dual jobs of field manager and general manager in Baltimore. Marion led the White Sox for two-plus seasons, finishing third in the American League each time, before he stepped down at the end of 1956.

In 1958, Marion purchased the Double-A minor league Houston Buffaloes from the Cardinals, and successfully moved the team to the Triple-A level under the Chicago Cubs farm system. He later sold the team to a group led by William Hopkins on August 16, 1960. Hopkins then sold the team to the Houston Sports Association led by Roy Hofheinz who had obtained a major league franchise in the National League which became the Houston Astros.

== Career statistics ==
In a 13-season career, Marion posted a .263 batting average with 36 home runs and 624 RBI in 1572 games. His career fielding percentage was .969. He made All-Star Game appearances from 1943 to 1944 and 1946–1950 (There was no All-Star Game in 1945). In 1944, he earned the National League Most Valuable Player Award. As a manager, he compiled a 356–372 record.

== Managerial record ==
Team	Year	Regular season					Postseason			
Team	Year	Games	Won	Lost	Win %	Finish	Won	Lost	Win %	Result
STL	1951	154	81	73	.526	3rd in NL	–	–	–	–
STL total		154	81	73	.526		0	0	–	
SLB	1952	103	42	61	.408	7th in AL	–	–	–	–
SLB	1953	154	54	100	.351	8th in AL	–	–	–	–
SLB total		257	96	161	.374		0	0	–	
CWS	1954	9	3	6	.333	3rd in AL	–	–	–	–
CWS	1955	154	91	63	.591	3rd in AL	–	–	–	–
CWS	1956	154	85	69	.552	3rd in AL	–	–	–	–
CWS total		317	179	138	.565		0	0	–	
Total		728	356	372	.489		0	0	–	

== NBA team purchase attempt ==
In 1957, Marion and business partner Milton Fischman attempted to buy the Minneapolis Lakers of the National Basketball Association from owners Ben Berger and Morris Chalfen with the intention to move the team to Kansas City, Missouri. Instead, Berger and Chalfen sold the team to Bob Short, who moved the team to Los Angeles.

== Death ==
Marion died of an apparent heart attack on March 15, 2011, at the age of 93. He lived in Ladue, Missouri.

== See also ==
- List of Major League Baseball annual doubles leaders
- List of Major League Baseball player–managers
- List of St. Louis Cardinals managers • Coaches
