= 1946 World Series =

1946 Major League Baseball championship series

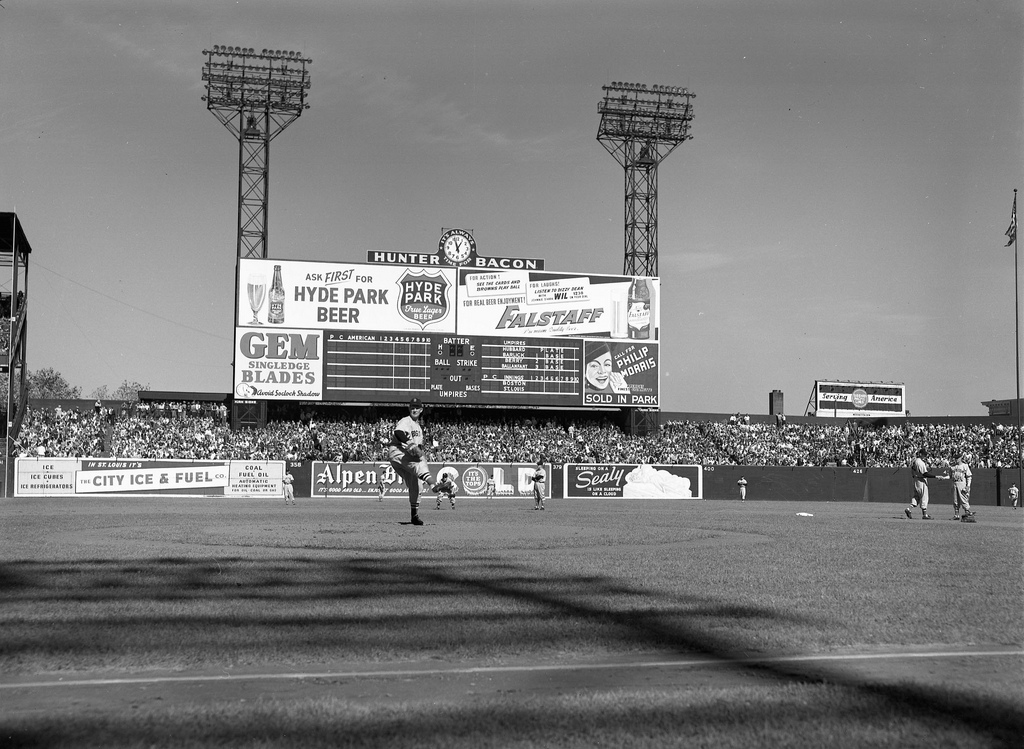
Team (Wins)	Managers	Season
St. Louis Cardinals (4)	Eddie Dyer	98–58, .628, GA: 2
Boston Red Sox (3)	Joe Cronin	104–50, .675, GA: 12
- Dates: October 6–15
- Venue(s): Sportsman's Park (St. Louis); Fenway Park (Boston)
- Umpires: Lee Ballanfant (NL), Cal Hubbard (AL), Al Barlick (NL), Charlie Berry (AL)
- Hall of Famers: Umpires: Cal Hubbard; Al Barlick; Cardinals: Stan Musial; Red Schoendienst; Enos Slaughter; Red Sox: Joe Cronin (manager; elected as a player); Bobby Doerr; Ted Williams

Broadcast
- Radio: Mutual
- Radio announcers: Jim Britt and Arch McDonald

The 1946 World Series was played in October 1946 between the St. Louis Cardinals (representing the National League, after winning a tie-breaker series) and the Boston Red Sox (representing the American League). This was the Red Sox' first appearance in a World Series since their championship of 1918.

In the eighth inning of Game 7, with the score 3–3, the Cardinals' Enos Slaughter opened the inning with a single but two batters failed to advance him. With two outs, Harry Walker walloped a hit over Johnny Pesky's head into left-center field. As Leon Culberson chased it down, Slaughter started his "mad dash". Pesky caught Culberson's throw, turned and—perhaps surprised to see Slaughter headed for the plate—supposedly hesitated just a split second before throwing home. Roy Partee had to take a few steps up the third base line to catch Pesky's toss, but Slaughter was safe without a play at the plate and Walker was credited with an RBI double. The Cardinals won the game and the Series in seven games, giving them their sixth championship.

Boston superstar Ted Williams played in the Series injured and was largely ineffective but refused to use his injury as an excuse. He hit only .200 in 25 at-bats with just one RBI in his only World Series appearance.

As the first World Series to be played after wartime travel restrictions had been lifted, it returned from the 3-4 format to the 2–3–2 format for home teams, which has been used since. It also saw the return of many prominent players from military service.

This was the first meeting between teams from Boston and St. Louis for a major professional sports championship. A Boston–St. Louis matchup has happened in the World Series three more times (1967, 2004, 2013), along with four NBA Finals (1957, 1958, 1960, 1961), Super Bowl XXXVI in 2002, and two Stanley Cup Finals (1970, 2019).

== Summary ==
NL St. Louis Cardinals (4) vs. AL Boston Red Sox (3)

Game	Date	Score	Location	Time	Attendance
1	October 6	Boston Red Sox – 3, St. Louis Cardinals – 2 (10)	Sportsman's Park	2:39	36,218
2	October 7	Boston Red Sox – 0, St. Louis Cardinals – 3	Sportsman's Park	1:56	35,815
3	October 9	St. Louis Cardinals – 0, Boston Red Sox – 4	Fenway Park	1:54	34,500
4	October 10	St. Louis Cardinals – 12, Boston Red Sox – 3	Fenway Park	2:31	35,645
5	October 11	St. Louis Cardinals – 3, Boston Red Sox – 6	Fenway Park	2:23	35,982
6	October 13	Boston Red Sox – 1, St. Louis Cardinals – 4	Sportsman's Park	1:56	35,768
7	October 15	Boston Red Sox – 3, St. Louis Cardinals – 4	Sportsman's Park	2:17	36,143

== Matchups ==
=== Game 1 ===
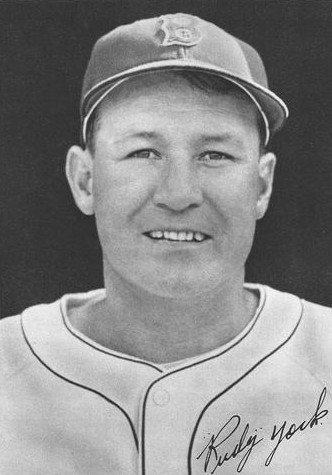
Rudy York

Sunday, October 6, 1946 1:30 pm (CT) at Sportsman's Park in St. Louis, Missouri
Team	1	2	3	4	5	6	7	8	9	10	R	H	E
Boston	0	1	0	0	0	0	0	0	1	1	3	9	2
St. Louis	0	0	0	0	0	1	0	1	0	0	2	7	0
WP: Earl Johnson (1–0) LP: Howie Pollet (0–1); Home runs: BOS: Rudy York (1); STL: None

The Red Sox struck first in Game 1 when Pinky Higgins followed a hit-by-pitch and walk in the second with an RBI single off Howie Pollet. The Cardinals tied the game in the sixth when Red Schoendienst singled, moved to second on a ground out, and scored on Stan Musial's double off Tex Hughson. They took the lead in the eighth when Whitey Kurowski singled with two outs and scored on Joe Garagiola's double. Pollet was a strike away from closing the game when Tom McBride tied the game with an RBI single with two on. Rudy York hit a home run into the left field bleachers in the tenth to put the Red Sox up 3–2. Earl Johnson pitched two shutout innings to close to give Boston a 1–0 series lead.

=== Game 2 ===
Harry Brecheen

Monday, October 7, 1946 1:30 pm (CT) at Sportsman's Park in St. Louis, Missouri
Team	1	2	3	4	5	6	7	8	9	R	H	E
Boston	0	0	0	0	0	0	0	0	0	0	4	1
St. Louis	0	0	1	0	2	0	0	0	X	3	6	0
WP: Harry Brecheen (1–0) LP: Mickey Harris (0–1)

The Cardinals struck first in Game 2 when Del Rice hit a leadoff double in the third off Mickey Harris and scored on Harry Brecheen's single. They added to their lead in the fifth with two unearned runs on Terry Moore's RBI single with two on followed by Stan Musial's groundout. Brecheen pitched a complete-game shutout as the Cardinals tied the series heading to Boston.

=== Game 3 ===
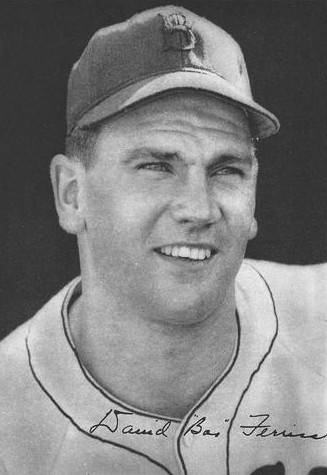
Dave Ferriss

Wednesday, October 9, 1946 1:30 pm (ET) at Fenway Park in Boston, Massachusetts
Team	1	2	3	4	5	6	7	8	9	R	H	E
St. Louis	0	0	0	0	0	0	0	0	0	0	6	1
Boston	3	0	0	0	0	0	0	1	X	4	8	0
WP: Dave Ferriss (1–0) LP: Murry Dickson (0–1); Home runs: STL: None; BOS: Rudy York (2)

In Game 3, Rudy York's three-run home run in the first off Murry Dickson gave the Red Sox an early 3–0 lead. They added another run in the eighth off Ted Wilks when Red Schoendienst misplayed Hal Wagner's ground ball with two on. Dave Ferriss pitched a complete-game shutout to give the Red Sox a 2–1 series lead.

=== Game 4 ===
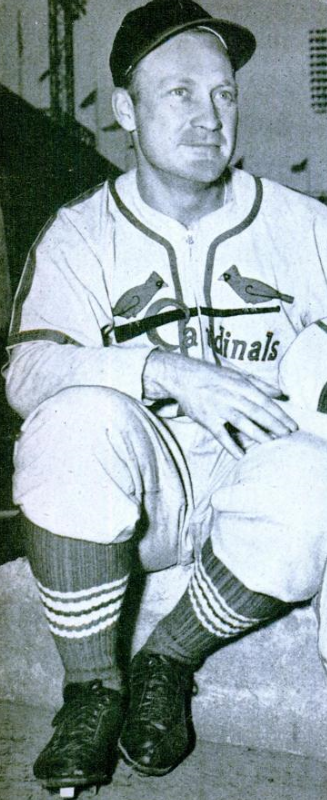
Whitey Kurowski

Thursday, October 10, 1946 1:30 pm (ET) at Fenway Park in Boston, Massachusetts
Team	1	2	3	4	5	6	7	8	9	R	H	E
St. Louis	0	3	3	0	1	0	1	0	4	12	20	1
Boston	0	0	0	1	0	0	0	2	0	3	9	4
WP: Red Munger (1–0) LP: Tex Hughson (0–1); Home runs: STL: Enos Slaughter (1); BOS: Bobby Doerr (1)

This is the only game in World Series history that three players on the same team (St. Louis) had four or more hits (Enos Slaughter, Whitey Kurowski and Joe Garagiola had four each). Red Sox outfielder Wally Moses got four hits as well and second baseman Bobby Doerr hit a two-run home run and would hit .409 in the Series.

Enos Slaughter's lead-off home run in the second off Tex Hughson put the Cardinals up 1–0. Whitey Kurowski doubled and scored on Harry Walker's single. Walker moved to third on an error before scoring on Marty Marion's groundout. Next inning, Stan Musial's two-run double extended the Cardinals' lead to 5–0. Jim Bagby relieved Hughson and allowed a two-out RBI single to Garagiola. The Red Sox got on the board in the fourth when Ted Williams singled off Red Munger and scored on Rudy York's double, but the Cardinals got that run back in the fifth on back-to-back doubles by Enos Slaughter and Kurowski. Garagiolas's RBI double in the seventh off Bill Zuber made it 8–1 Cardinals. Bobby Doerr hit a two-run home run in the eighth, but the Cardinals put the game out of reach in the ninth. Three straight singles to lead off made it 9–3 Cardinals. Mike Ryba relieved Mace Brown and allowed a two-run double to Marty Marion, then an error on Red Schoendienst's ground ball scored the last run of the game. Munger pitched a complete game to tie the series for St. Louis.

=== Game 5 ===
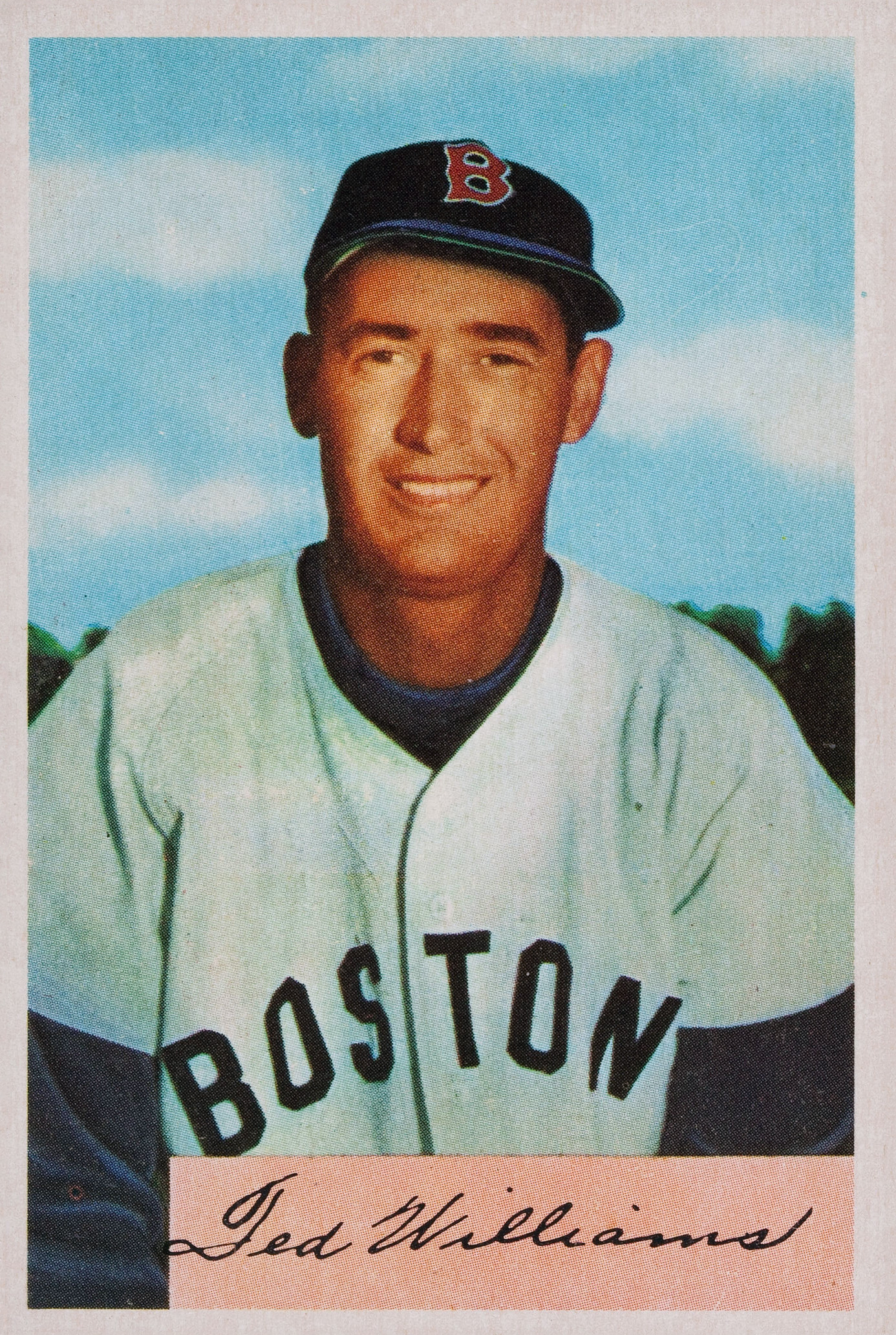
Ted Williams

Friday, October 11, 1946 1:30 pm (ET) at Fenway Park in Boston, Massachusetts
Team	1	2	3	4	5	6	7	8	9	R	H	E
St. Louis	0	1	0	0	0	0	0	0	2	3	4	1
Boston	1	1	0	0	0	1	3	0	X	6	11	3
WP: Joe Dobson (1–0) LP: Al Brazle (0–1); Home runs: STL: None; BOS: Leon Culberson (1)

Ted Williams hit a RBI single, his only RBI of the whole Series, in the first off Howie Pollet. After the Cardinals tied the game in the second on Harry Walker's RBI double after an error off Joe Dobson, Don Gutteridge's RBI single off Al Brazle in the bottom of the inning put the Red Sox back up 2–1. Leon Culberson's home run in the sixth made it 3–1 Red Sox. Next inning, after a double, strikeout and intentional walk, Pinky Higgins's RBI double made it 4–1 Red Sox. After another intentional walk loaded the bases, shortstop Marty Marion's errant throw to second on Roy Partee's ground ball allowed two more runs to score. Dobson allowed a two-run single in the ninth to Harry Walker before retiring Marion to end the game and put the Red Sox one win away from the championship.

=== Game 6 ===
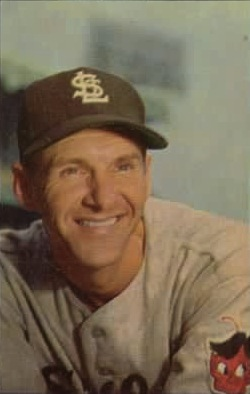
Marty Marion

Sunday, October 13, 1946 1:30 pm (CT) at Sportsman's Park in St. Louis, Missouri
Team	1	2	3	4	5	6	7	8	9	R	H	E
Boston	0	0	0	0	0	0	1	0	0	1	7	0
St. Louis	0	0	3	0	0	0	0	1	X	4	8	0
WP: Harry Brecheen (2–0) LP: Mickey Harris (0–2)

St. Louis staved off elimination at home, chasing Boston starter Mickey Harris with a three-run third. With two on and one out, Terry Moore's sacrifice fly scored the game's first run. After a single, back-to-back RBI singles by Whitey Kurowski and Enos Slaughter made it 3–0 Cardinals. The Red Sox scored their only run of the game in the seventh when Rudy York hit a leadoff triple and scored on Bobby Doerr's sacrifice fly. Marty Marion added an RBI double in the eighth off Earl Johnson to back Harry Brecheen's second win of the Series.

=== Game 7 ===
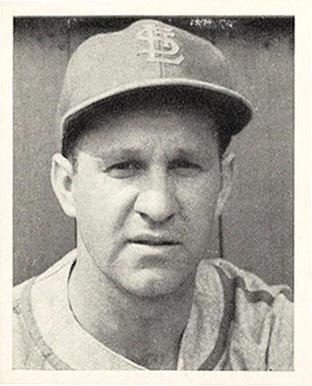
Enos Slaughter

Tuesday, October 15, 1946 1:30 pm (CT) at Sportsman's Park in St. Louis, Missouri
Team	1	2	3	4	5	6	7	8	9	R	H	E
Boston	1	0	0	0	0	0	0	2	0	3	8	0
St. Louis	0	1	0	0	2	0	0	1	X	4	9	1
WP: Harry Brecheen (3–0) LP: Bob Klinger (0–1)

The Red Sox struck first in Game 7 on Dom DiMaggio's sacrifice fly after two leadoff singles off Murry Dickson. The Cardinals tied the game in the second when Whitey Kurowski hit a leadoff double, moved to third on a groundout and scored on Harry Walker's sacrifice fly off Dave Ferriss. In the fifth, Walker hit a leadoff single and scored on a double by Dickson, who scored on Red Schoendienst's single. The Cardinals led 3–1 in the eighth inning when Dom DiMaggio tied the game with a two-run double but had to be removed from the game after severely pulling a hamstring and Leon Culberson took his position in the center field.

In the bottom of the frame, Enos Slaughter scored from first base on a play called the Mad Dash. From the dugout, Dom DiMaggio tried in vain to get the reserve Culberson to shade Walker properly. As the runner started, Walker lined the ball to left-center field. Culberson was out of position and slow to field the ball. As he threw a relay to shortstop Johnny Pesky, Slaughter rounded third base, ignored third base coach Mike González's stop sign, and continued for home plate.

What exactly happened when Pesky turned around is still a matter of contention. Some claim that Pesky, assuming that Slaughter would not be running home, checked Walker at first base instead of immediately firing home. Some contend that Pesky was shocked to see Slaughter on his way to score and "held the ball," a mental lapse. But Pesky's reaction after taking the throw is immaterial. The run was lost by a chain of unfortunate events: Dom DiMaggio pulling up injured; the Red Sox lacking a better defensive replacement than Leon Culberson; Culberson being out of position on Walker's hit; Culberson's slow pickup of the ball, complicated by a rough outfield surface, and Culberson's weak throw; and Slaughter's speed and aggressive base-running. Slaughter scored just as Red Sox catcher Roy Partee caught Pesky's relay up the line from home plate.

The run put the Cardinals ahead 4–3 and proved to be the winning run. Harry "The Cat" Brecheen had come out of the bullpen during Boston's rally in the eighth when the Red Sox had two men on base, and he gave up the double by DiMaggio that tied the game. Brecheen allowed two singles to start the ninth inning, but then retired the Red Sox without giving up a run, to record his third victory of the Series.

== Composite box score ==
1946 World Series (4–3): St. Louis Cardinals (N.L.) over Boston Red Sox (A.L.)

Team	1	2	3	4	5	6	7	8	9	10	R	H	E
St. Louis Cardinals	0	5	7	0	5	1	1	3	6	0	28	60	4
Boston Red Sox	5	2	0	1	0	1	4	5	1	1	20	56	10
Total attendance: 250,071 Average attendance: 35,724; Winning player's share: $3,742 Losing player's share: $2,141

== Series statistics ==
=== Boston Red Sox ===
==== Batting ====
Note: GP=Games played; AB=At bats; R=Runs; H=Hits; 2B=Doubles; 3B=Triples; HR=Home runs; RBI=Runs batted in; BB=Walks; AVG=Batting average; OBP=On base percentage; SLG=Slugging percentage

Player	GP	AB	R	H	2B	3B	HR	RBI	BB	AVG	OBP	SLG	Reference
Hal Wagner	5	13	0	0	0	0	0	0	0	.000	.000	.000	
Rudy York	7	23	6	6	1	1	2	5	6	.261	.433	.652	
Bobby Doerr	6	22	1	9	1	0	1	3	2	.409	.458	.591	
Pinky Higgins	7	24	1	5	1	0	0	2	2	.208	.269	.250	
Johnny Pesky	7	30	2	7	0	0	0	0	1	.233	.258	.233	
Ted Williams	7	25	2	5	0	0	0	1	5	.200	.333	.200	
Dom DiMaggio	7	27	2	7	3	0	0	3	2	.259	.310	.370	
Wally Moses	4	12	1	5	0	0	0	0	1	.417	.462	.417	
Tom McBride	5	12	0	2	0	0	0	1	0	.167	.167	.167	
Roy Partee	5	10	1	1	0	0	0	1	1	.100	.182	.100	
Leon Culberson	5	9	1	2	0	0	1	1	1	.222	.300	.556	
Don Gutteridge	3	5	1	2	0	0	0	1	0	.400	.400	.400	
George Metkovich	2	2	1	1	1	0	0	0	0	.500	.500	1.000	
Rip Russell	2	2	1	2	0	0	0	0	0	1.000	1.000	1.000	
Dave Ferriss	2	6	0	0	0	0	0	0	0	.000	.000	.000	
Tex Hughson	3	3	0	1	0	0	0	0	1	.333	.500	.333	
Joe Dobson	3	3	0	0	0	0	0	0	0	.000	.000	.000	
Mickey Harris	2	3	0	1	0	0	0	0	0	.333	.333	.333	
Earl Johnson	3	1	0	0	0	0	0	0	0	.000	.000	.000	
Jim Bagby	1	1	0	0	0	0	0	0	0	.000	.000	.000	

==== Pitching ====
Note: G=Games Played; GS=Games Started; IP=Innings Pitched; H=Hits; BB=Walks; R=Runs; ER=Earned Runs; SO=Strikeouts; W=Wins; L=Losses; SV=Saves; ERA=Earned Run Average

Player	G	GS	IP	H	BB	R	ER	SO	W	L	SV	ERA	Reference
Tex Hughson	3	2	14 1/3	14	3	8	5	8	0	1	0	3.14	
Dave Ferriss	2	2	13 1/3	13	2	3	3	4	1	0	0	2.03	
Joe Dobson	3	1	12 2/3	4	3	3	0	10	1	0	0	0.00	
Mickey Harris	2	2	9 2/3	11	4	6	4	5	0	2	0	3.72	
Earl Johnson	3	0	3 1/3	1	2	1	1	1	1	0	0	2.70	
Jim Bagby	1	0	3	6	1	1	1	1	0	0	0	3.00	
Bill Zuber	1	0	2	3	1	1	1	1	0	0	0	4.50	
Mace Brown	1	0	1	4	1	3	3	0	0	0	0	27.00	
Bob Klinger	1	0	0 2/3	2	1	1	1	0	0	1	0	13.50	
Mike Ryba	1	0	0 2/3	2	1	1	1	0	0	0	0	13.50	
Clem Dreiseward	1	0	0 1/3	0	0	0	0	0	0	0	0	0.00	

=== St. Louis Cardinals ===
==== Batting ====
Note: GP=Games played; AB=At bats; R=Runs; H=Hits; 2B=Doubles; 3B=Triples; HR=Home runs; RBI=Runs batted in; BB=Walks; AVG=Batting average; OBP=On base percentage; SLG=Slugging percentage

Player	GP	AB	R	H	2B	3B	HR	RBI	BB	AVG	OBP	SLG	Reference
Joe Garagiola	5	19	2	6	2	0	0	4	0	.316	.316	.421	
Stan Musial	7	27	3	6	4	1	0	4	4	.222	.323	.444	
Red Schoendiest	7	30	3	7	1	0	0	1	0	.233	.233	.267	
Whitey Kurowski	7	27	5	8	3	0	0	2	0	.296	.321	.407	
Marty Marion	7	24	1	6	2	0	0	4	1	.250	.280	.333	
Harry Walker	7	17	3	7	2	0	0	6	4	.412	.524	.529	
Terry Moore	7	27	1	4	0	0	0	2	2	.148	.207	.148	
Enos Slaughter	7	25	5	8	1	1	1	2	4	.320	.433	.560	
Del Rice	3	6	2	3	1	0	0	0	2	.500	.625	.667	
Erv Dusak	4	4	0	1	1	0	0	0	2	.250	.500	.500	
Dick Sisler	2	2	0	0	0	0	0	0	0	.000	.000	.000	
Nippy Jones	1	1	0	0	0	0	0	0	0	.000	.000	.000	
Harry Brecheen	3	8	2	1	0	0	0	1	0	.125	.125	.125	
Murry Dickson	2	5	1	2	2	0	0	1	0	.400	.400	.800	
Howie Pollet	2	4	0	0	0	0	0	0	0	.000	.000	.000	
Red Munger	1	4	0	1	0	0	0	0	0	.250	.250	.250	
Al Brazle	1	2	0	0	0	0	0	0	0	.000	.000	.000	

==== Pitching ====
Note: G=Games Played; GS=Games Started; IP=Innings Pitched; H=Hits; BB=Walks; R=Runs; ER=Earned Runs; SO=Strikeouts; W=Wins; L=Losses; SV=Saves; ERA=Earned Run Average

Player	G	GS	IP	H	BB	R	ER	SO	W	L	SV	ERA	Reference
Harry Brecheen	3	2	20	14	5	1	1	11	3	0	0	0.45	
Murry Dickson	2	2	14	11	4	6	6	7	0	1	0	3.86	
Howie Pollet	2	2	10 1/3	12	4	4	4	3	0	1	0	3.48	
Red Munger	1	1	9	9	3	3	1	2	1	0	0	1.00	
Al Brazle	1	0	6 2/3	7	6	5	4	4	0	1	0	5.40	
Johnny Beazley	1	0	1	1	0	0	0	1	0	0	0	0.00	
Ted Wilks	1	0	1	2	0	1	0	0	0	0	0	0.00	

== Highlights ==
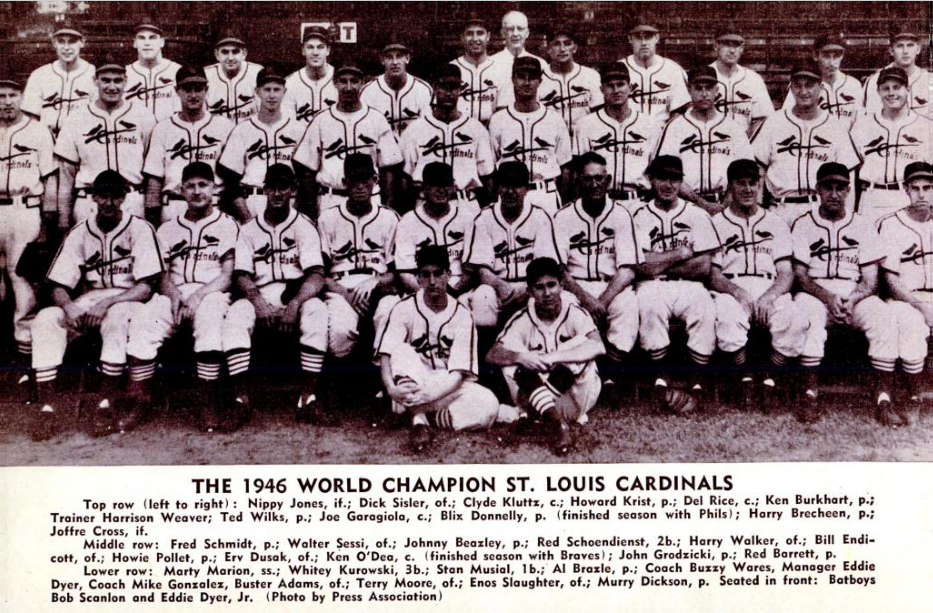

- This was the first World Series appearance for the Red Sox since 1918, and it would be their last appearance until 1967, when they would again lose to the Cardinals in seven games. However, the Red Sox would win the next two World Series matchups with the Cardinals, sweeping them in 2004 to break an 86-year championship drought, and then defeating them in six games in 2013 (Boston's third in ten years).
- The World Series loss snapped the Red Sox's record of winning their first five postseason series, a feat that would not be matched until the Florida Marlins did it 57 years later in the 2003 National League Championship Series.
- Joe Cronin became the fourth manager to take two teams to the World Series (Pat Moran, Bill McKechnie, and Joe McCarthy were the first three) but was the first who did not win with either of them.
- This was the final World Series in which only four umpires were used.
- Several sources erroneously reported that Harry Walker hit a single allowing Enos Slaughter to score. It was officially scored a double.
- This was the first World Series in which the final out in Game 7 came with the tying run on third base.

== See also ==
- 1946 Negro World Series
- Curse of the Bambino

== Sources ==
- Cohen, Richard M.; Neft, David S. (1990). The World Series: Complete Play-By-Play of Every Game, 1903–1989. New York: St. Martin's Press. pp. 208–212. ISBN 0-312-03960-3.
- Reichler, Joseph (1982). The Baseball Encyclopedia (5th ed.). Macmillan Publishing. p. 2154. ISBN 0-02-579010-2.
