= Whitey Kurowski =

American baseball player (1918–1999)

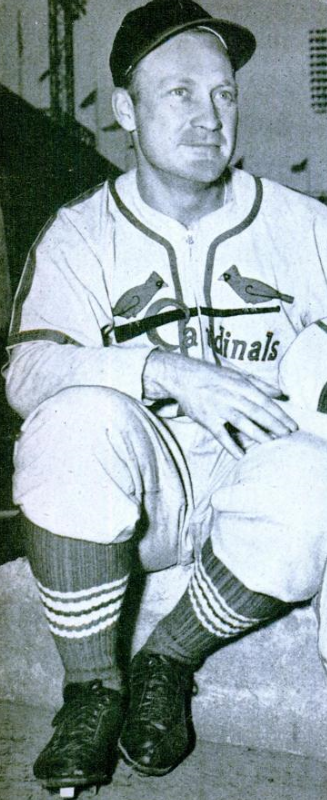
- Third baseman
- Born: April 19, 1918; Reading, Pennsylvania, U.S.
- Died: December 9, 1999 (aged 81); Sinking Spring, Pennsylvania, U.S.
- Batted: Right Threw: Right

MLB debut
- September 23, 1941, for the St. Louis Cardinals

Last MLB appearance
- October 1, 1949, for the St. Louis Cardinals

MLB statistics
- Batting average: .286
- Home runs: 106
- Runs batted in: 529
- Stats at Baseball Reference

Teams
- St. Louis Cardinals (1941–1949)

Career highlights and awards
- 5× All-Star (1943–1947); 3× World Series champion (1942, 1944, 1946); St. Louis Cardinals Hall of Fame

George John "Whitey" Kurowski (April 19, 1918 – December 9, 1999) was an American professional baseball third baseman. He played 9 seasons in Major League Baseball (MLB) for the St. Louis Cardinals, and was an All-Star in five consecutive seasons. Kurowski's childhood nickname came from his already white hair.

== Childhood ==
A native of Reading, Pennsylvania, Kurowski overcame several personal problems, including a bout with childhood osteomyelitis that eventually forced the removal of part of a bone on his right forearm. Before he started his baseball career, his older brother died in a mine accident, and his father died from a heart attack during spring training in 1942.

== Playing career ==
Kurowski batted and threw right-handed, and debuted as Major Leaguer on September 23, 1941.

His most productive season came in 1947, when he posted career-highs in average (.310), home runs (27), RBI (104), runs (108), doubles (27), slugging % (.544) and on-base % (.420).

An All-Star during five consecutive seasons (1943–47), Kurowski exceeded the 20-home run mark three times to set a major league record for a third baseman (1944–45, 1947), and hit over .300 three times (1945–47). He also led the National League three times in putouts, twice in fielding %, and once in double plays.

In four World Series appearances, Kurowski hit .253 (21-for-83) with one home run and nine RBI in 23 games, as the Cardinals were World Champions in 1942, 1944 and 1946. His one postseason homer came in 1942, off Red Ruffing, broke a 2–2 tie in the ninth inning of Game Five to clinch the title for St. Louis over the New York Yankees.

In 1949, he developed arm and elbow problems and his playing career ended, with his final game taking place on October 1, 1949.

Across a nine-season career, Kurowski posted a .286 batting average with 106 home runs and 529 RBI in 916 games played.

== Managing career ==
After retiring as a player, Kurowski coached and managed in the minor leagues for 18 years until 1972. Additionally, he made rare appearances on the field as a player, working in both the Cardinal and Cleveland Indians organizations. In his final professional at-bat in 1959, he recorded a base hit with Billings Mustangs of the Pioneer League.

== Legacy ==
Kurowski was a huge contributor for the Cardinals during their most successful run as a franchise, winning the World Series in 1942, 1944 and 1946 and adding another National League pennant in 1943. In games that Kurowski played, the Cardinals had a winning percentage of .620, finishing in second place or higher in every season of his career and winning 90+ games in all but two seasons. After retiring, the Redbirds wouldn't finish as high as second place again until 1957, and wouldn't claim another National League pennant until 1964.

The five time National League All-Star started the 1946 All-Star Game at third base. But Kurowski's impact each season was felt long after the Midsummer Classic, as he proved to be a consistent player as the dog days of an often unforgiving baseball summer wore on. For instance, his slugging percentage increased by 15 points in the second half of the season, and he maintained his career .286 batting average across both halves of the season. Moreover, he hit 47% more home runs (and 15% more extra-base hits) in the second half of the season.

Such was his consistency that Kurowski appeared five times in the National League MVP ballot, in 1942 and from 1944 through 1947.

He gained induction into the National Polish-American Hall of Fame in 1988.

Kurowski was selected to the St. Louis Cardinals Hall of Fame in 2024.

Kurowski died in Sinking Spring, Pennsylvania on December 9, 1999 at age 81.

== See also ==
- Van Lingle Mungo (song)
