= Al Brazle =

American baseball player (1913–1973)

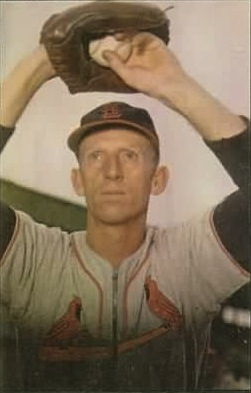
- Brazle, c. 1953
- Pitcher
- Born: October 19, 1913; Loyal, Oklahoma, U.S.
- Died: October 24, 1973 (aged 60); Grand Junction, Colorado, U.S.
- Batted: Left Threw: Left

MLB debut
- July 25, 1943, for the St. Louis Cardinals

Last MLB appearance
- September 24, 1954, for the St. Louis Cardinals

MLB statistics
- Win–loss record: 97–64
- Earned run average: 3.31
- Strikeouts: 554
- Saves: 59
- Stats at Baseball Reference

Teams
- St. Louis Cardinals (1943, 1946–1954)

Career highlights and awards
- World Series champion (1946)

Alpha Eugene Brazle (October 19, 1913 – October 24, 1973) was an American Major League Baseball pitcher. The left-hander was signed by the Boston Red Sox as an amateur free agent in 1936, and later traded to the St. Louis Cardinals for pitcher Mike Ryba in September, 1940. He played his entire MLB career for the Cards (1943, 1946–1954). In 1954, at the age of 40, he was the oldest player to appear in a National League game that season.

After the 1954 season was over, Brazle was signed by the Chicago White Sox. He was subsequently released by Chicago without playing a regular season game for the team.

Brazle played 7½ years in the minor leagues before he became a 29-year-old Cardinal rookie. He completed 47 of 117 starts, with 7 shutouts, and twice led the National League in saves (1952 and 1953).

Brazle finished in the league's top ten in a dozen pitching categories, including games pitched (7 times), saves (6 times), games finished (5 times), winning percentage (4 times), and earned run average (3 times).

His career totals include a record of 97–64 (.602), 441 games, 60 saves, 178 games finished, 1376.2 innings pitched, 554 strikeouts, and a 3.31 ERA. He was a member of two pennant-winning clubs, losing in the 1943 World Series to the New York Yankees, and winning the 1946 World Series against the Boston Red Sox.

Brazle died at the age of 60 in Grand Junction, Colorado.

== See also ==
- List of St. Louis Cardinals team records
- List of Major League Baseball annual saves leaders
- List of Major League Baseball players who spent their entire career with one franchise
