= Harry Brecheen =

American baseball player (1914–2004)

- Brecheen with the Baltimore Orioles in 1955
- Pitcher
- Born: October 14, 1914; Broken Bow, Oklahoma, U.S.
- Died: January 17, 2004 (aged 89); Bethany, Oklahoma, U.S.
- Batted: Left Threw: Left

MLB debut
- April 22, 1940, for the St. Louis Cardinals

Last MLB appearance
- September 13, 1953, for the St. Louis Browns

MLB statistics
- Win–loss record: 133–92
- Earned run average: 2.92
- Strikeouts: 901
- Stats at Baseball Reference

Teams
- St. Louis Cardinals (1940, 1943–1952); St. Louis Browns (1953)

Career highlights and awards
- 2× All-Star (1947, 1948); 3× World Series champion (1944, 1946, 1966); MLB ERA leader (1948); NL strikeout leader (1948); St. Louis Cardinals Hall of Fame

Harry David Brecheen (/brɛˈkiːn/ breh-KEEN; October 14, 1914 – January 17, 2004), known as "Harry the Cat", was an American professional baseball pitcher. He played 12 seasons in Major League Baseball (MLB) for the St. Louis Cardinals and St. Louis Browns. He became the first left-hander to win three games in a single World Series, and the only pitcher to win consecutive World Series games. He later led the National League in several categories in 1948.

Bracheen's career World Series earned run average of 0.83 was a major league record from 1946 to 1976. From 1951 to 1971, he held the Cardinals' franchise record for career strikeouts by a left-hander, and he also retired with the fourth-highest fielding percentage among pitchers (.983), then the top mark among left-handers.

== Early life ==
Born in Broken Bow, Oklahoma, Brecheen was acquired by the Cardinals in 1938 from the Chicago Cubs after two minor league seasons, but made only three relief appearances during 1940 and did not pitch again at the major league level until 1943. He was nicknamed "the Cat" because of his ability to cover bunts.

== Career ==
Brecheen appeared in three games, all in relief, in 1940. Exempted from military service during World War II with a 4-F classification due to a spinal malformation and a boyhood ankle injury, he pitched in the 1943 and 1944 World Series. In 1943, Brecheen pitched in 29 games, starting 13 of them. He went 9–6 with a 2.29 earned run average in 135 innings pitched. The next season, he went 16–5. Brecheen won game four of the 1944 World Series against the St. Louis Browns. He was key to the Cardinals' upset win over the Boston Red Sox in the 1946 World Series as he won three games during the series. Brecheen recorded his finest season in 1948, posting a win–loss record of 20–7 with 21 complete games and led the league in earned run average (2.24), strikeouts (149) and shutouts (7).

A two-time All-Star, Brecheen's overall career record was 133 wins and 92 losses, with a 2.92 earned run average over 12 seasons. After breaking Bill Sherdel's club record for career strikeouts by a left-hander in 1951, he held the mark until Steve Carlton surpassed it in 1971. Brecheen's 25 career shutouts remain the Cardinal record for left-handers. His career World Series ERA of 0.83 stood as the record (with at least 25 innings) until Jack Billingham broke it in 1976 with a mark of 0.36.

Playing his entire career for St. Louis teams, Brecheen ended his career in 1953 as a playing coach with the St. Louis Browns; it was that team's final season in the city before their move to Baltimore. He won his only start of the 1944 Series, which matched the city's two teams.

As a hitter, Brecheen was better than average for a pitcher, posting a .192 batting average (129-for-673) with 48 runs, 2 home runs, 44 RBI and 45 bases on balls.

Brecheen's screwball was ranked the eighth-best of all time by Bill James and Rob Neyer.

== Later life ==
Following his playing career, Brecheen remained with the Browns when they became the Baltimore Orioles. His playing career ended in 1954 after straining his pitching arm picking up a heavy suitcase, then he stayed with the organization as their pitching coach from 1954 to 1967. While coaching the Orioles pitchers for the next 14 years, the Orioles’ staff ranked in the top four in ERA. He trained many young pitchers including Billy O'Dell, Jack Fisher, Jim Palmer, Dave McNally, Steve Barber, Chuck Estrada, Jerry Walker and Milt Pappas.

He was also successful with turning around the careers of veterans. In 1959, he converted 36-year-old Hoyt Wilhelm into a starter and the knuckleballer led the league with a 2.19 era and a 15-11 record. With Brecheen's help, seemingly washed up Phillies legend Robin Roberts made a successful comeback with the Orioles after going 1-10 with a 5.85 ERA in 1961. Roberts would win 42 games with the Orioles over his 3 1/2 years with Baltimore. Brecheen was let go after the 1967 season after too many promising Orioles pitchers turned up with arm troubles during his long tenure. He was voted into the Oklahoma Sports Hall of Fame in 1997. He died at age 89 in a nursing facility in Bethany, Oklahoma.

== See also ==
- List of St. Louis Cardinals team records
- List of Major League Baseball annual ERA leaders
- List of Major League Baseball annual strikeout leaders

Sporting positions
Preceded by n/a	St. Louis Browns pitching coach 1953	Succeeded by Franchise relocated
Preceded by Franchise established	Baltimore Orioles pitching coach 1954–1967	Succeeded by George Bamberger
