= Pray for Rain =

Pray for Rain may refer to:

- Pray for Rain (band), San Francisco-based band and film score composers
- PFR, Nashville Christian rock band
- Pray for Rain, 1992 album by PFR
- Pray for Rain, 1996 album by Tim Feehan
- Pray for Rain, 2015 album by Pure Bathing Culture
- "Pray for Rain", song from Bad English album Backlash
- "Pray for Rain", song from Massive Attack album Heligoland
- Pray for Rain (film), 2017 film
- "Pray for Rain", 1948 poem about Warren Spahn and Johnny Sain.
