= Atlanta Braves =

Major League Baseball franchise

- 2026 Atlanta Braves season

Logo	Cap insignia
- Established in 1871; Based in Atlanta since 1966

Major league affiliations
- National League (1876–present); East Division (1994–present); West Division (1969–1993); National Association (1871–1875)

Current uniform
- Retired numbers: 3; 6; 10; 21; 25; 29; 31; 35; 41; 44; 47; 42

Colors
- Navy blue, scarlet red, gold, white (Note: The team's official colors are navy blue and scarlet red, according to the team's mascot (BLOOPER)'s official website.)

Name
- Atlanta Braves (1966–present); Milwaukee Braves (1953–1965); Boston Braves (1941–1952); Boston Bees (1936–1940); Boston Braves (1912–1935); Boston Rustlers (1911); Boston Doves (1907–1910); Boston Beaneaters (1883–1906); Boston Red Caps (1876–1882); Boston Red Stockings (1871–1875)

Nicknames
- The Bravos; America's Team

Ballpark
- Truist Park (2017–present); Turner Field (1997–2016); Atlanta–Fulton County Stadium (1966–1996); Milwaukee County Stadium (1953–1965); Braves Field (1915–1952); Fenway Park (1914–1915); Congress Street Grounds (1894); South End Grounds (1871–1914)

Major league titles
- World Series titles (4): 1914; 1957; 1995; 2021
- NL pennants (18): 1877; 1878; 1883; 1891; 1892; 1893; 1897; 1898; 1914; 1948; 1957; 1958; 1991; 1992; 1995; 1996; 1999; 2021
- NA pennants (4): 1872; 1873; 1874; 1875
- NL East division titles (19): 1995; 1996; 1997; 1998; 1999; 2000; 2001; 2002; 2003; 2004; 2005; 2013; 2018; 2019; 2020; 2021; 2022; 2023; 2026
- NL West division titles (5): 1969; 1982; 1991; 1992; 1993
- Pre-modern World Series (1): 1892
- Wild card berths (3): 2010; 2012; 2024

Front office
- Principal owners: Atlanta Braves Holdings, Inc. Traded as: Nasdaq: BATRA (Series A); OTCQB: BATRB (Series B); Nasdaq: BATRK (Series C); Russell 2000 components (BATRA, BATRK)
- President: Derek Schiller
- President of baseball operations: Alex Anthopoulos
- General manager: Alex Anthopoulos
- Manager: Walt Weiss
- Mascot: Blooper
- Website: mlb.com/braves

The Atlanta Braves are an American professional baseball team based in the Atlanta metropolitan area. The Braves compete in Major League Baseball (MLB) as a member club of the National League (NL) East Division. The club was founded in Boston, Massachusetts, in 1871 as the Boston Red Stockings and was known by various names until it adopted the Boston Braves name in 1912. The Braves are one of two remaining National League charter franchises that debuted in 1876 and are the oldest continuously operating professional sports franchise in North America.

After 82 seasons and one World Series title in Boston, the club moved to Milwaukee, Wisconsin, in 1953. With a roster of Hall-of-Fame players such as Hank Aaron, Eddie Mathews, and Warren Spahn, the Milwaukee Braves won the World Series in 1957. Despite the team's success, fan attendance declined. The club's owners moved the team to Atlanta, Georgia, in 1966.

The Braves did not find much success in Atlanta until 1991. From 1991 to 2005, the Braves were one of the most successful teams in baseball, winning an unprecedented 14 consecutive division titles, making an MLB record eight consecutive National League Championship Series appearances, and producing one of the greatest pitching rotations in the history of baseball including Hall of Famers Greg Maddux, John Smoltz, and Tom Glavine.

The club has won an MLB record 24 divisional titles, 18 National League pennants, and 4 World Series championships. The Braves are the only Major League Baseball franchise to have won the World Series in three different home cities. At the end of the 2025 season, the Braves' overall win–loss record is 11,190–11,035–154 (.503). Since moving to Atlanta in 1966, the Braves have an overall win–loss record of 4,926–4,547–8 (.520) through the end of 2025.

== History ==
=== Boston (1871–1952) ===
==== 1871–1913 ====
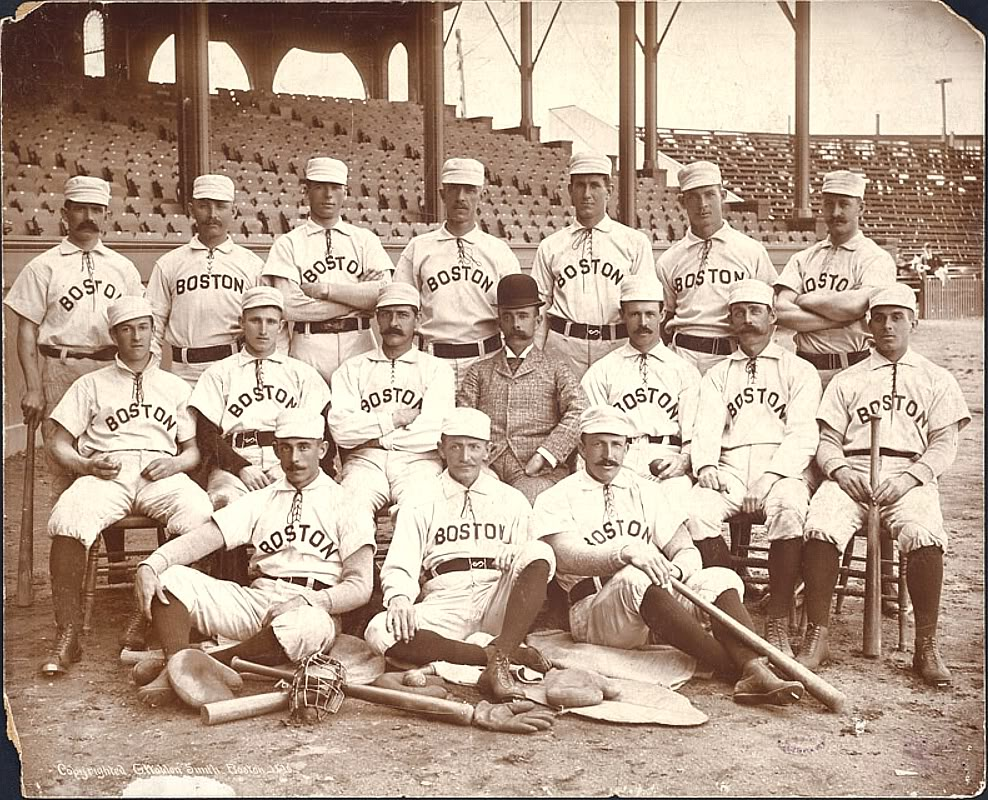
Boston Beaneaters team photo, 1890

The Cincinnati Red Stockings, formed in 1869, were the first openly all-professional baseball team but disbanded after the 1870 season. Manager Harry Wright and players moved to Boston, forming the Boston Red Stockings, a charter team in the National Association of Professional Base Ball Players (NAPBBP). Led by the Wright brothers, Ross Barnes, and Al Spalding, they dominated the National Association, winning four of five championships. The original Boston Red Stockings team and its successors can lay claim to being the oldest continuously playing franchise in American professional sports.

The club was known as the Boston Red Caps when they played the first National League game in 1876, winning against the Philadelphia Athletics. Despite a weaker roster in the league's first year, they rebounded to secure the 1877 and 1878 pennants. Managed by Frank Selee, they were a dominant force in the 19th century, winning eight pennants. By 1898, the team was known as the Beaneaters and had won 102 games that season, with stars like Hugh Duffy, Tommy McCarthy, and "Slidin'" Billy Hamilton.

In 1901, the American League was introduced, causing many Beaneaters players including stars Duffy and Jimmy Collins to leave for clubs of the rival league. The team struggled, recording only one winning season from 1900 to 1913. In 1907, they temporarily dropped the red color from their stockings due to infection concerns.

The club underwent various nickname changes until becoming the Braves before the 1912 season. The president of the club, John M. Ward, named the club after the owner, James Gaffney. Gaffney was called one of the "braves" of New York City's political machine, Tammany Hall, which used a Native American chief as its symbol.

==== 1914: Miracle ====
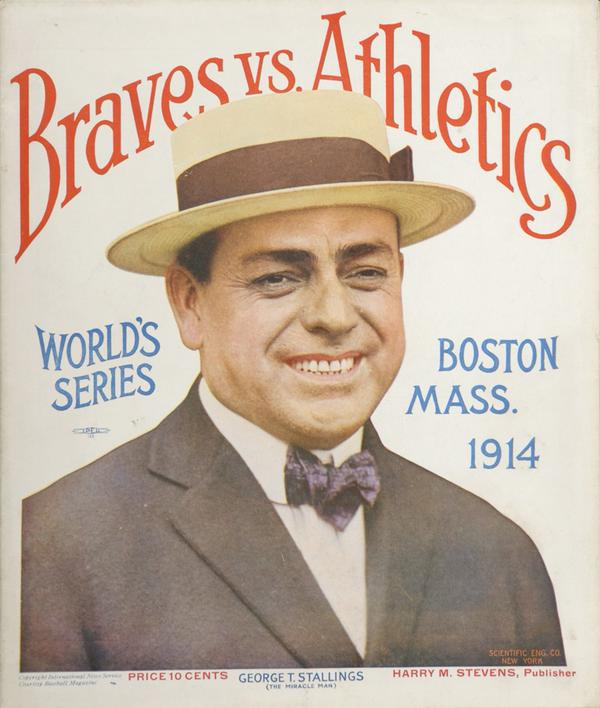
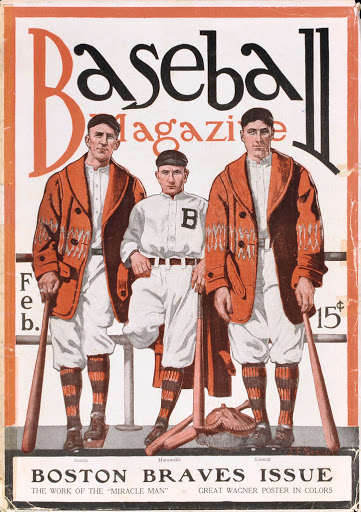
A program from the 1914 World Series, featuring Braves manager George Stallings (left). Baseball Magazine cover, 1914 (right).

In 1914, the Boston Braves experienced a remarkable turnaround in what would become one of the most memorable seasons in baseball history. Starting with a dismal 4–18 record, the Braves found themselves in last place, trailing the league-leading New York Giants by 15 games after losing a doubleheader to the Brooklyn Robins on July 4. However, the team rebounded with an incredible hot streak, going 41–12 from July 6 to September 5. On August 3, Joseph Lannin, the president of the Red Sox, offered Fenway Park to the Braves free of charge for the remainder of the season as their usual home, the South End Grounds, was too small. On September 7 and 8, they defeated the Giants in two out of three games, propelling them into first place. Despite being in last place as late as July 18, the Braves secured the pennant. They became the only team under the old eight-team league format to achieve this after being in last place on the Fourth of July. They were in last place as late as July 18, but were close to the pack, moving into fourth on July 21 and second place on August 12.

The Braves entered the 1914 World Series led by captain and National League Most Valuable Player, Johnny Evers. The Boston club was a slight underdog against Connie Mack's Philadelphia A's. However, they swept the Athletics and won the world championship. Inspired by their success, owner Gaffney constructed a modern park, Braves Field, which opened in August 1915. At the time it was the largest park in the majors, boasting 40,000 seats and convenient public transportation access.

==== 1915–1952 ====
The Boston Braves cap logo, 1946 to 1952

From 1917 to 1933, the Boston Braves struggled. After a series of different owners, a syndicate led by Emil Fuchs and including pitching great and Fuchs' longtime friend Christy Mathewson bought the team in 1923. Mathewson's death in 1925 left Fuchs in control of the team. Despite Fuchs' commitment to success, the team faced challenges overcoming the damage from previous years. It was not until 1933 and 1934, under manager Bill McKechnie, that the Braves became competitive, but the team's improvement in performance did little to help its finances.

In an effort to boost fan attendance and finances, Fuchs orchestrated a deal with the New York Yankees to acquire Babe Ruth in 1935. Ruth was appointed team vice president with promises of profit shares and managerial prospects. Initially, Ruth seemed to provide a spark on opening day, but his declining skills became evident. Ruth's inability to run and poor fielding led to internal strife, and it became clear that his titles were symbolic. Ruth retired on June 1, 1935, shortly after hitting his last three home runs. The Braves finished the season with a dismal 38–115 record, marking the franchise's worst season.

Fuchs lost control of the team in August 1935, leading to a rebranding attempt as the Boston Bees, but it did little to alter the team's fortune. Construction magnate Lou Perini took over, eventually restoring the Braves' name. Despite World War II causing a brief setback, the team, led by pitcher Warren Spahn, enjoyed impressive seasons in 1946 and 1947 under Perini's ownership.

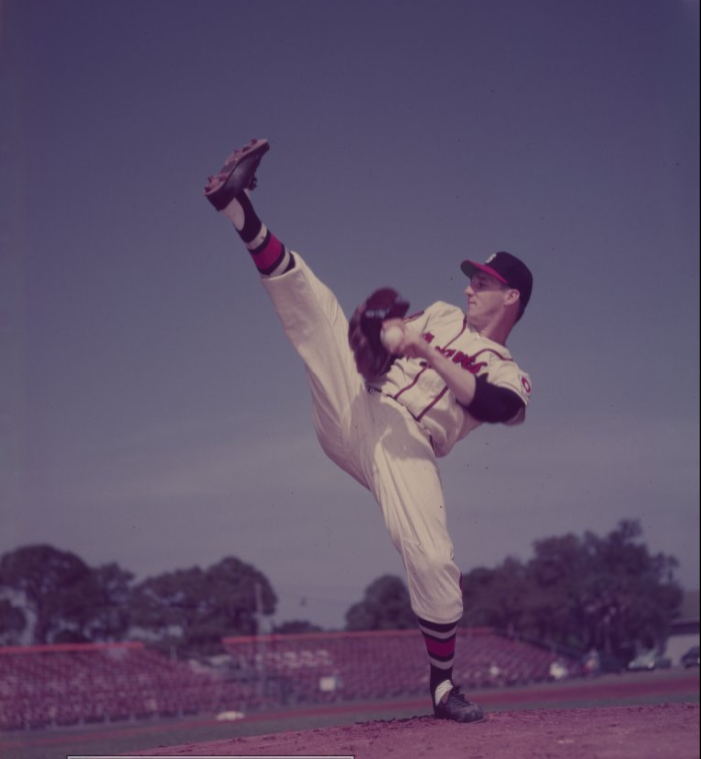
Hall of Fame pitcher Warren Spahn

In 1948, the team won the pennant, behind the pitching of Spahn and Johnny Sain. The remainder of the rotation was so thin that in September, Boston Post writer Gerald Hern wrote the poem "Pray for Rain" about the pair:

First we'll use Spahn
then we'll use Sain
Then an off day
followed by rain
Back will come Spahn
followed by Sain
And followed
we hope
by two days of rain.

The poem reached and found favor with an audience so wide that the poem's sentiment, now usually paraphrased as "Spahn and Sain and pray for rain" or "Spahn and Sain, then pray for rain", entered the baseball vocabulary.

The 1948 World Series, which the Braves lost in six games to the Indians, turned out to be the Braves' last hurrah in Boston. On March 13, 1953, Perini announced the club's move to Milwaukee. Perini cited the advent of television and the lack of fan enthusiasm for the Braves in Boston as the key factors in deciding to move the franchise.

=== Milwaukee (1953–1965) ===
The Milwaukee Braves cap logo

The Milwaukee Braves' move to Wisconsin for the 1953 season was an immediate success, as they drew a National League-record 1.8 million fans and finished the season second in the league. Manager Charlie Grimm was named NL Manager of the Year.

Throughout the 1950s, the Braves were a National League power. After relocating to Milwaukee in 1953, the Braves were led by future Hall of Famers Warren Spahn and Eddie Matthews, and Hank Aaron. The trio helped establish the team as a dominant National League club, leading Milwaukee to the 1957 World Series championship and another National League pennant in 1958. Driven by sluggers Eddie Mathews and Hank Aaron, the team won two pennants and finished second twice between 1956 and 1959. In 1957, Aaron's MVP season led the Braves to their first pennant in nine years, followed by a World Series victory against the formidable New York Yankees. Despite a strong start in the World Series rematch the following season, the Braves ultimately lost the last three games and the World Series. The 1959 season ended in a tie with the Los Angeles Dodgers, who defeated the Braves in a playoff series. The ensuing years saw fluctuating success, including the Braves finishing fifth in 1963, their first time in the "second division".

In 1962, team owner Louis Perini sold the Braves to a Chicago-based group led by William Bartholomay. Bartholomay intended to move the team to Atlanta in 1965, but legal hurdles kept them in Milwaukee for an extra season.

=== Atlanta (1966–present) ===
==== 1966–1974 ====
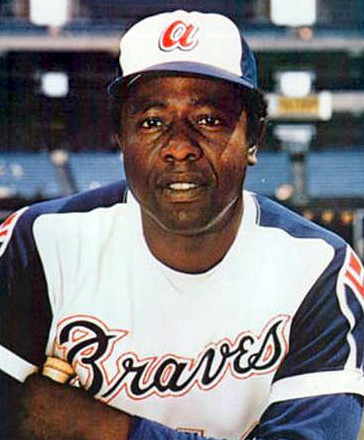
Hall of Fame right fielder and designated hitter Hank Aaron

The Braves' relocation from Milwaukee to Atlanta was approved by team ownership on October 21, 1964, by a 12-6 vote. However, legal action in Wisconsin delayed the move, requiring the team to remain in Milwaukee for the 1965 season before relocating to Atlanta in 1966. After National League owners approved the relocation, the Braves signed a 25-year lease to play at Atlanta Stadium beginning with the 1966 season.

After arriving in Atlanta in 1966, the Braves found success in 1969, winning the first National League West Division title with the onset of divisional play. In the National League Championship Series the Braves were swept by the "Miracle Mets". They posted only two winning seasons between 1970 and 1981. Fans in Atlanta had to be satisfied with the achievements of Hank Aaron, who by the end of the 1973 season, had hit 713 home runs, one short of Babe Ruth's record. On April 4, opening day of the next season, he hit No. 714 in Cincinnati, and on April 8, in front of his home fans and a national television audience, he finally beat Ruth's mark with a home run to left-center field off left-hander Al Downing of the Los Angeles Dodgers. Aaron spent most of his career as a Milwaukee and Atlanta Brave before being traded to the Milwaukee Brewers on November 2, 1974.

==== Ted Turner and Time Warner era ====
===== 1976–1977: Ted Turner buys the team =====
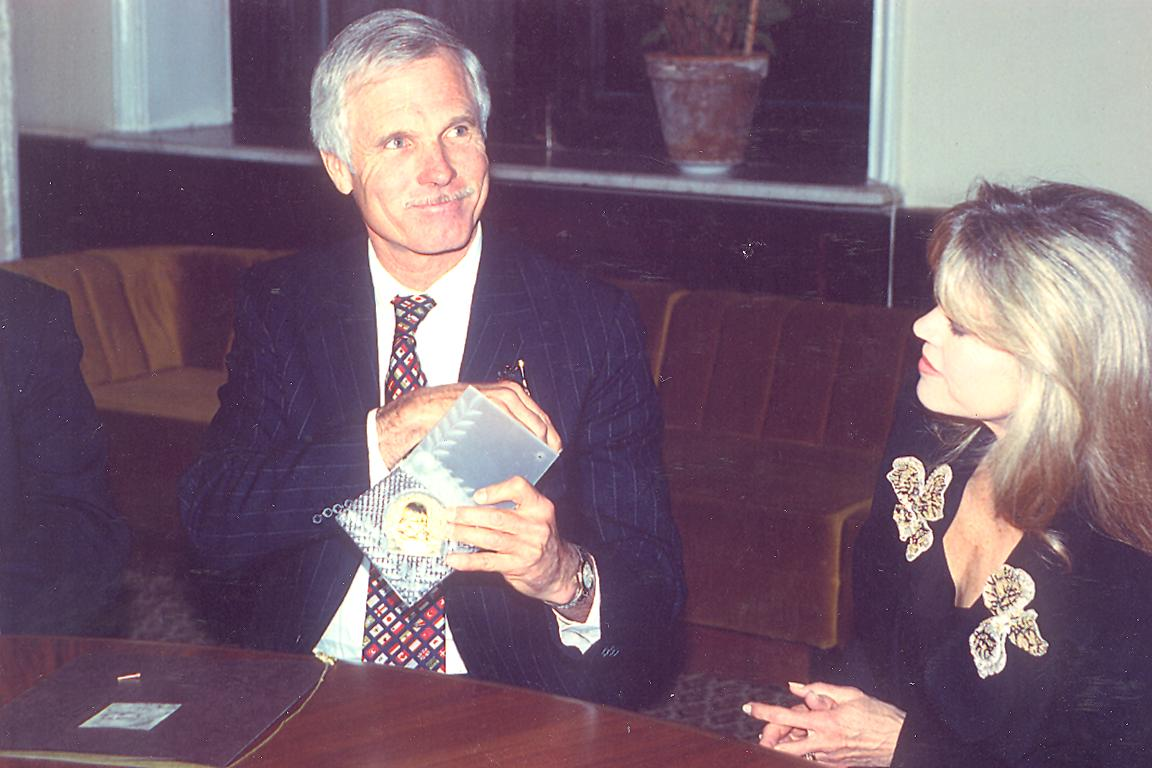
Media magnate Ted Turner purchased the team in 1976, and played a large role in the team's operation.

In 1976, the team was purchased by media magnate Ted Turner, owner of superstation WTBS, as a means to keep the team (and one of his main programming staples) in Atlanta. Turner used the Braves as a major programming draw for his fledgling cable network, making the Braves the first franchise to have a nationwide audience and fan base. WTBS marketed the team as "The Atlanta Braves: America's Team", a nickname that still has some currency in certain areas of the country, especially the South. The financially strapped Turner used money already paid to the team for their broadcast rights as a down-payment. Turner quickly gained a reputation as a quirky, hands-on baseball owner. On May 11, 1977, Turner appointed himself manager. However, the MLB passed a rule in the 1950s barring managers from holding a financial stake in their teams, Turner was ordered to relinquish that position after one game (the Braves lost 2–1 to the Pittsburgh Pirates extending their losing streak to 17 games).

===== 1978–1990 =====
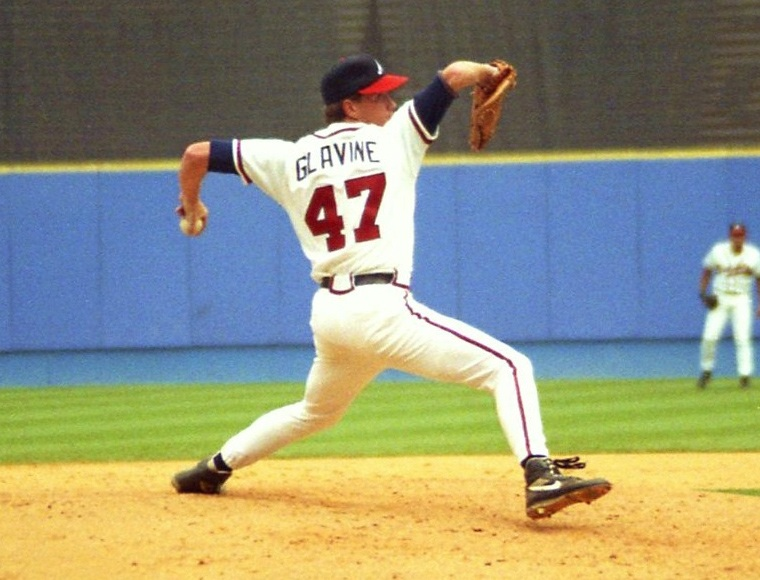
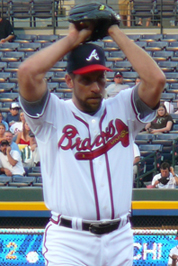
Greg Maddux, Tom Glavine, and John Smoltz combined for six Cy Young Awards during their time in the Braves pitching rotation

The Braves did not enjoy much success between 1978 and 1990. However, in the 1982 season, led by manager Joe Torre, the Braves secured their first divisional title since 1969. The team was led by standout performances from key players such as Dale Murphy, Bob Horner, Chris Chambliss, Phil Niekro, and Gene Garber. The Braves were swept in the NLCS in three games by the Cardinals. Murphy won the National League's Most Valuable Player award in 1982 and 1983.

===== 1991–2005: 14 consecutive division titles =====
From 1991 to 2005, the Atlanta Braves enjoyed a remarkable era of success in baseball, marked by a record-setting 14 consecutive division titles, five National League pennants, and a World Series championship in 1995. Bobby Cox returned as manager in 1990, leading the team's turnaround after finishing the previous season with the worst record in baseball. Notable developments included the drafting of Chipper Jones in 1990 and the hiring of general manager John Schuerholz from the Kansas City Royals.

The Braves' remarkable journey began in 1991, known as the "Worst to First" season. Overcoming a shaky start, the Braves bounced back led by young pitchers Tom Glavine and John Smoltz. The team secured the NL pennant in a memorable playoff race, ultimately losing a closely contested World Series to the Minnesota Twins. The next year, the Braves won the NLCS in dramatic fashion against the Pirates but fell short in the World Series against the Toronto Blue Jays.

In 1993, the Braves strengthened their pitching staff with the addition of Cy Young Award winner Greg Maddux in free agency. Despite posting a franchise-best 104 wins, they lost in the NLCS to the Philadelphia Phillies. The team moved to the Eastern Division in 1994, sparking a heated rivalry with the New York Mets.

The player's strike cut short the 1994 season just before the division championships, but the Braves rebounded in 1995, defeating the Cleveland Indians to win the World Series. The 1995 championship marked the Braves' first World Series title since relocating to Atlanta and completed a period of sustained success that began with the teams turnarond in 1991. With this World Series victory, the Braves became the first team in Major League Baseball to win world championships in three different cities. The Braves reached the World Series in 1996 and 1999 but were defeated both times by the New York Yankees.

In 1996, Time Warner acquired Ted Turner's Turner Broadcasting System, including the Braves. Despite their continued success with a ninth consecutive division title in 2000, the Braves faced postseason disappointment, losing in a sweep to the St. Louis Cardinals in the NLDS. The team won division titles from 2002 to 2004, but experienced early exits in the NLDS each year.

==== Liberty Media era ====
===== Liberty Media buys the team =====
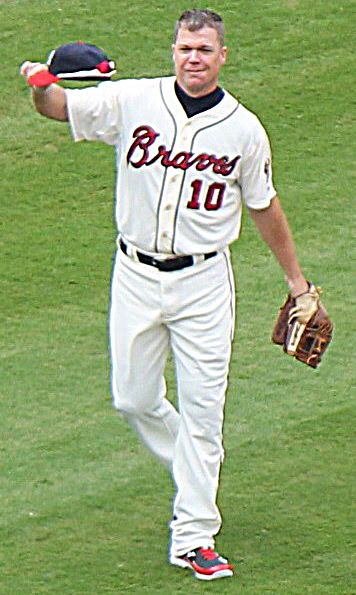
Chipper Jones salutes the crowd at Turner Field before his final regular-season game on September 30, 2012. Jones announced he would retire after 19 seasons with the Braves

In December 2005, Time Warner put the club up for sale, leading to negotiations with Liberty Media. After more than a year of talks, Time Warner agreed in February 2007 to repurchase 68.5 million of its shares held by Liberty. In exchange, Liberty would receive the Braves (valued at $450 million), Leisure Arts, and $980 million in cash. The transaction, valued at about $1.48 billion, required approval from 75 percent of MLB owners and Commissioner Bud Selig.

===== Bobby Cox and Chipper Jones retire =====
Bobby Cox's final year as manager in 2010 saw the Braves return to the postseason for the first time since 2005. The team secured the NL Wild Card but fell to the San Francisco Giants in the National League Division Series in four closely contested games, marking the conclusion of Bobby Cox's managerial career. The next season, the Braves suffered a historic September collapse to miss the postseason. The club bounced back in 2012 and returned to the postseason in Chipper Jones' final season. The Braves won 94 games in 2012, but that wasn't enough to win the NL East, so they faced the St. Louis Cardinals in the inaugural Wild Card Game. Chipper Jones's last game was a memorable one: the Braves lost the one-game playoff 6–3, but the game would be remembered for a controversial infield fly call that helped end a Braves rally in the 8th inning.

===== Truist Park and return to the World Series =====
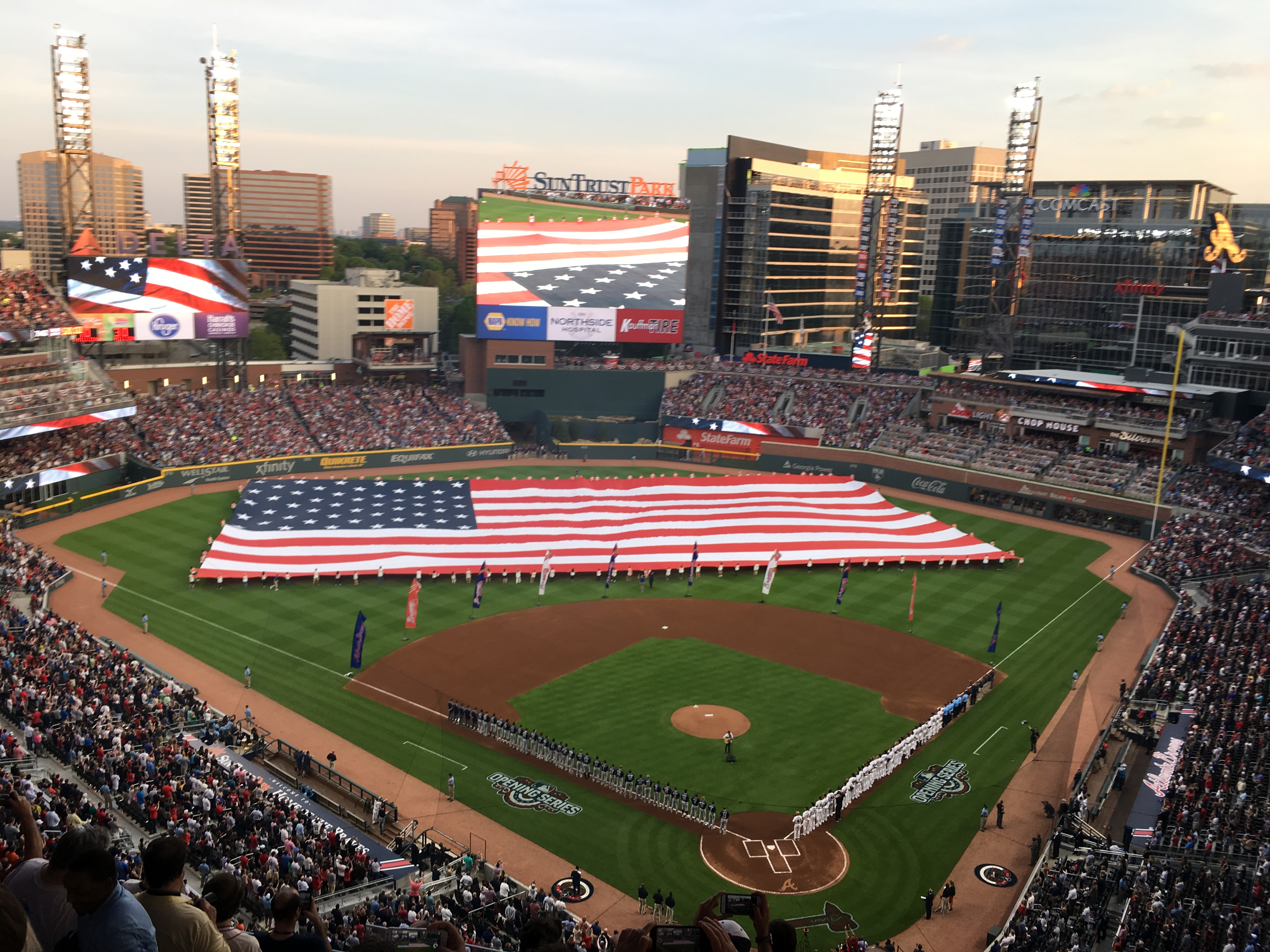
Truist Park before its first regular-season game

In 2017, the Atlanta Braves began playing at Truist Park, replacing Turner Field as their home stadium. After an MLB investigation into international signing rule violations, general manager John Coppolella resigned and was banned from baseball. Alex Anthopoulos took over as the new general manager. The team's chairman, Terry McGuirk, apologized for the scandal and expressed confidence in Anthopoulos's integrity. Before the 2017 season, a new on-field mascot named Blooper was introduced at a fan event. Under Anthopoulos, the Braves made the playoffs in six of his first seven seasons. In 2020, the Braves reached the National League Championship Series, but ultimately lost to the Dodgers after leading 3–1.

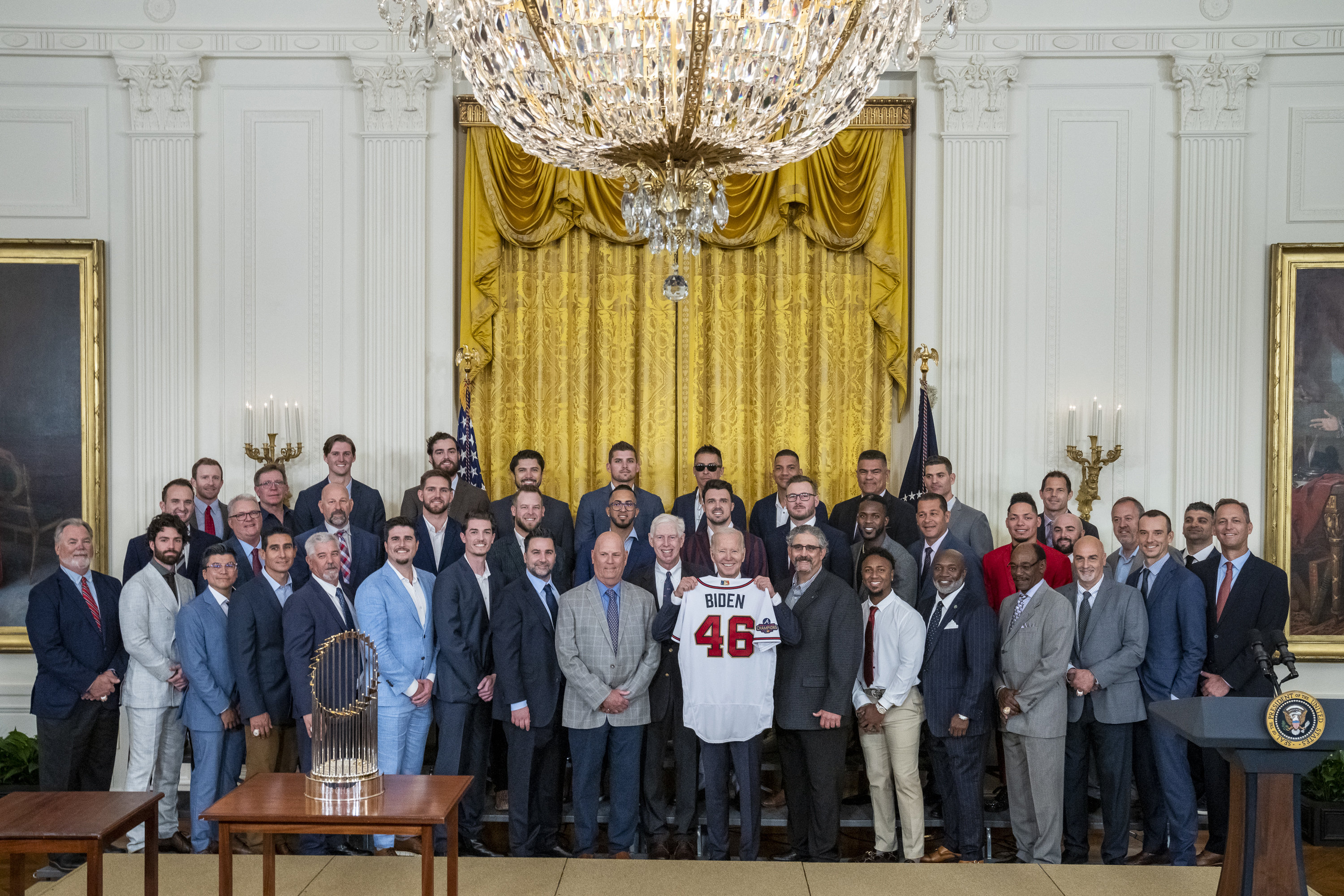
President Joe Biden hosts the 2021 World Series Champion Atlanta Braves on September 26, 2022, in the East Room of the White House.

In the 2021 season, the Braves won the National League East with an 88–73 record. In the postseason, they quickly defeated the Milwaukee Brewers in the NL Division Series 3–1. The Braves again faced the Dodgers in the 2021 NLCS, and won in six games to take Atlanta's first National League pennant since 1999. The Braves advanced to the World Series. They defeated the Houston Astros in six games to win their fourth World Series title.

===== End of postseason run and Brian Snitker era =====
The Braves failed to qualify for the postseason in 2025, ending a streak of seven consecutive appearances. After 49 years with the organization, including ten seasons as manager, the team announced that Snitker would step down from his managerial role and transition into an advisory position with the club. In November 2025, the Braves announced that longtime bench coach Walt Weiss would be promoted to manager. Weiss, a former All-Star shortstop also spent part of his playing career in Atlanta.

=== Logos and uniforms ===
The Braves logos have evolved over the years, featuring a Native American warrior from 1945 to 1955, followed by a laughing Native American with a mohawk and a feather from 1956 to 1965. The modern logo, introduced in 1987, includes the cursive word "Braves" with a tomahawk below it. Uniforms adopted that year evoked their 1950s classic look. For the 2023 season, the Braves had four uniform combinations, including the classic white home and gray road uniforms, a navy blue road jersey for alternate games, and two alternate uniforms for home games: a Friday night red uniform and a City Connect uniform worn on Saturdays, paying tribute to Hank Aaron. The City Connect uniform features "The A" across the chest, accompanied by a cap with the "A" logo and 1974 uniform colors. The Braves retired the '70s-era City Connects and unveiled a new alternate uniform ahead of the 2026 season. The new jersey is an homage to their cable television-fueled growth in the 1980s. Powder-blue pullovers with a script "Atlanta" on the front and a lowercase "A" hat reference their contemporary away uniform, while an "ATL" wordmark on the left sleeve and printing above the laundry tag are designed similar to the classic TBS SuperStation logo.

Since the 2023 season, the Braves have worn a jersey sponsorship patch featuring Atlanta-based construction materials company Quikrete, with whom the team has had a partnership since 2017. The patch is a representation of Quikrete's signature yellow package of concrete mix. In 2026 it was announced that Quikrete would continue their sponsorship through the 2036 season.

== World Series championships ==
Over the 120 years since the inception of the World Series (119 total World Series played), the Braves franchise has won a total of four World Series Championships. The Braves are the only franchise to have won a World Series in three different cities.

Season	Manager	Opponent	Series Score	Record
1914 (Boston)	George Stallings	Philadelphia Athletics	4–0	94–59
1957 (Milwaukee)	Fred Haney	New York Yankees	4–3	95–59
1995 (Atlanta)	Bobby Cox	Cleveland Indians	4–2	90–54
2021 (Atlanta)	Brian Snitker	Houston Astros	4–2	88–73
Total World Series championships:				4

== Ballparks ==
=== Former parks ===
The Boston Braves played at the South End Grounds from their inception. After a fire destroyed the park in 1894, the club temporarily played at the Congress Street Grounds until the South End Grounds could be rebuilt. During the 1914 season, it became evident that the South End Grounds was too small to accommodate larger crowds, prompting the team to play some games at Fenway Park. To address the need for a larger venue, Braves Field was built in 1915.

Braves Field remained the club's home in Boston until the team relocated to Milwaukee. Milwaukee County Stadium was constructed in 1950 to attract a Major League Baseball team and became the Braves' new home in 1953. The team played there until moving to Atlanta in 1966.

The city of Atlanta constructed Atlanta–Fulton County Stadium in 1965 after reaching an agreement with the Braves to relocate from Milwaukee. The Braves played at Atlanta–Fulton County Stadium until 1997, when they moved to Turner Field. Originally built as Centennial Olympic Stadium for the 1996 Summer Olympics, the venue was later converted into a ballpark for the Braves. Turner Field served as the Braves' home ballpark through the 2016 season.

=== Current parks ===
==== Truist Park ====
The Atlanta Braves home ballpark has been Truist Park since 2017. Truist Park is located approximately 10 miles (16 km) northwest of downtown Atlanta in the unincorporated community of Cumberland, in Cobb County, Georgia. The Braves opened Truist Park on April 14, 2017, with a four-game sweep of the San Diego Padres. The park received positive reviews from critics. Woody Studenmund of the Hardball Times called the park a "gem" saying that he was impressed with "the compact beauty of the stadium and its exciting approach to combining baseball, business and social activities." J.J. Cooper of Baseball America praised the "excellent sight lines for pretty much every seat."

==== CoolToday Park ====
Since 2019, the Braves have played spring training games at CoolToday Park in North Port, Florida. The ballpark opened on March 24, 2019, with the Braves' 4–2 win over the Tampa Bay Rays. The Braves left Champion Stadium, their previous Spring Training home, near Orlando, to reduce travel times and to get closer to other teams' facilities. CoolToday Park also serves as the Braves' year-round rehabilitation facility.

== Major rivalry ==
=== New York Mets ===
Although their first major confrontation occurred when the Mets swept the Braves in the 1969 National League Championship Series (NLCS), the rivalry did not become especially heated until the 1994 season when division realignment put both the Mets and the Braves in the National League East division.

The Braves faced the Mets in the 1999 National League Championship Series. The Braves initially took a 3–0 series lead, seemingly on the verge of a sweep, but the Mets rallied in Game 4 and Game 5. Despite the Mets' resilience, the Braves eventually won the series in Game 6 with Andruw Jones securing a dramatic walk-off walk, earning their 5th National League pennant of the 1990s. In 2022, the Braves and Mets both finished with 101 wins. The National League East title and a first-round bye came down to a crucial three-game series at Truist Park from September 30 to October 2. The Mets entered with a slight lead but faltered as the Braves swept the series, clinching the division title and first-round playoff bye.

Since the Mets joined the league in 1962, both teams have won two World Series titles. The Braves have captured six NL pennants, while the Mets have won five. The Braves hold the advantage in the all-time head-to-head record between the two teams at 516–425. However, the Mets have the upper hand in playoff matchups with a 5–4 record.

== Nationwide fanbase ==
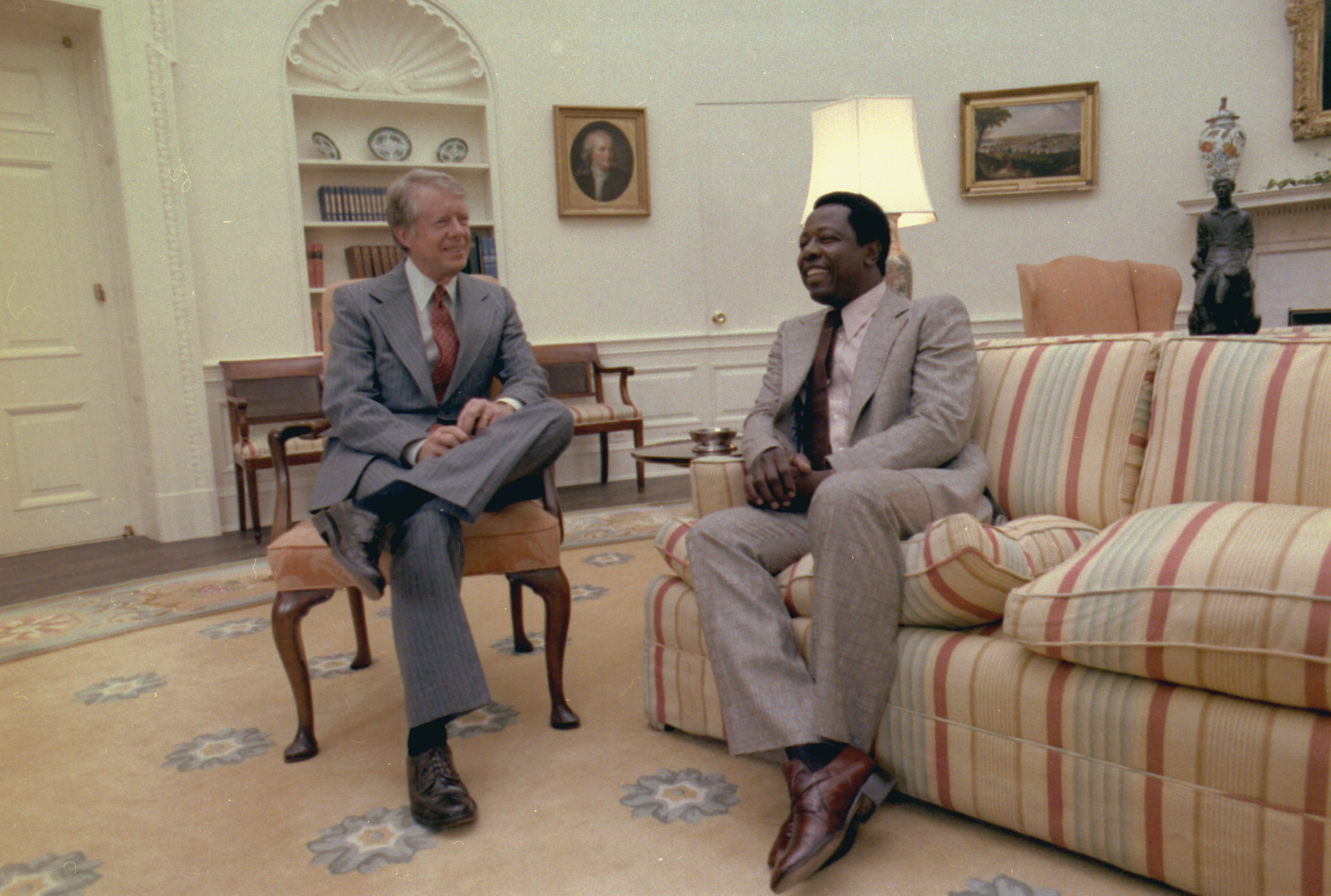
Former U.S. President Jimmy Carter was a lifelong Braves fan and personal friend of Hank Aaron. Pictured is Aaron meeting President Carter in the Oval Office in 1978.

In addition to having strong fan support in the Metro Atlanta area and the state of Georgia, the Braves have been referred to as "America's Team" in reference to the team's games being broadcast nationally on TBS from the 1970s until 2007, giving the team a nationwide fan base.

The Braves boast heavy support within the Southeastern United States, particularly in states such as Mississippi, Alabama, South Carolina, North Carolina, Tennessee and Florida.

== Tomahawk chop ==
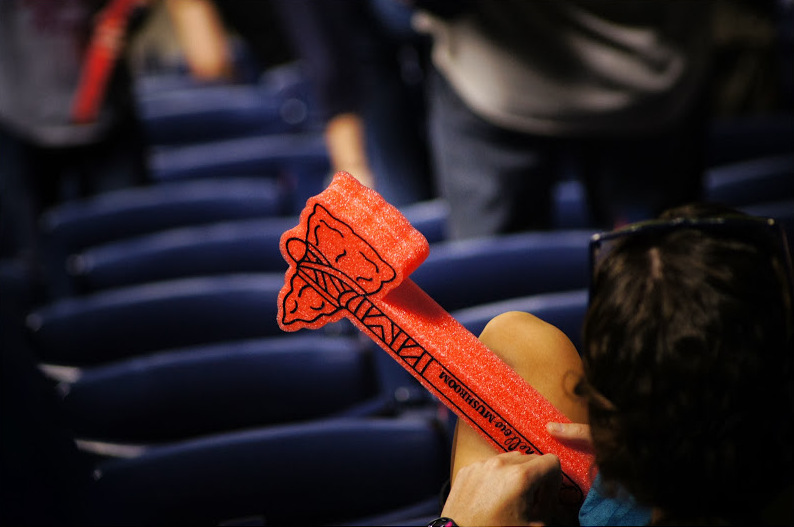
The Atlanta Braves encouraged fans to gesture with the "Tomahawk Chop", distributing foam tomahawks at games and other events.

In 1991, fans of the Atlanta Braves popularized the "tomahawk chop" during games. The use of foam tomahawks faced criticism from Native American groups, who regarded it as demeaning. Despite protests, the Braves' public relations director defended it as a "proud expression of unification and family." The controversy resurfaced in 2019 when Cherokee Nation member and St. Louis Cardinals pitcher Ryan Helsley found the chop insulting, prompting the Braves to modify their in-game experience. During the off-season, discussions ensued with Native American representatives, and amid pressure in 2020 to change their name, the Braves announced ongoing talks about the chop but insisted the team name would remain unchanged.

The debate over the tomahawk chop continued into 2021. While some Native American leaders, such as Richard Sneed, Principal Chief of the Eastern Band of Cherokee Indians, expressed personal indifference or tolerance, acknowledging it as an acknowledgment of Native American strength, others vehemently opposed it. Sneed emphasized larger issues facing Native American communities and questioned the focus on the chop. The Eastern Cherokee Band of Indians and the Braves initiated efforts to incorporate Cherokee language and culture into the team's activities, stadium, and merchandise, aiming for greater cultural sensitivity despite differing opinions within the Native American community.

== Personnel ==
=== Manager ===
Brian Snitker stepped down as manager of the Braves after the 2025 season. The team named Walt Weiss as his replacement. Weiss had served as a coach with the Braves since 2018, and previously managed the Colorado Rockies from 2013 to 2016.

=== Active roster ===
Atlanta Braves 2027 spring training roster
40-man roster		Non-roster invitees	Coaches / other
**Pitchers**: 76 Blake Burkhalter; -- Cédric De Grandpré; 46 Dylan Dodd; 55 Bryce Elder; -- Cameron Foster; 72 Didier Fuentes; -- Michael Grove; 66 Grant Holmes; 00 James Karinchak; 62 Ray Kerr; 52 Dylan Lee; 40 Reynaldo López; 58 Víctor Mederos; 67 Rolddy Muñoz; 73 Owen Murphy; -- Mitchell Parker; -- Evan Phillips; -- Davis Polo; 60 JR Ritchie; 51 Chris Sale; 56 Spencer Schwellenbach; 32 AJ Smith-Shawver; 75 Robert Suárez; -- Tyler Uberstine; 64 Hurston Waldrep; 33 Joey Wentz; -- Danny Young	**Catchers**: 30 Drake Baldwin; 12 Sean Murphy; **Infielders**: 1 Ozzie Albies; 74 Jim Jarvis; 28 Matt Olson; 27 Austin Riley; -- Brett Wisely; **Outfielders**: 13 Ronald Acuña Jr.; 23 Michael Harris II; 53 Brewer Hicklen; 18 Mike Yastrzemski	**Infielders**: -- Vidal Bruján; -- Tyler Freeman	**Manager**: 22 Walt Weiss; **Coaches**: 88 Darnell Coles (assistant hitting); 83 Tony Diaz (assistant); 81 Dustin Garneau (catching); 85 Jeremy Hefner (pitching); 80 Tim Hyers (hitting); 10 Chipper Jones (hitting consultant); 89 Tony Mansolino (bench); 87 J.P. Martinez (bullpen); 98 Wigberto Nevarez (bullpen catcher); 95 Eddie Pérez (assistant); 86 Antoan Richardson (first base); 84 Tommy Watkins (third base); 96 José Yepez (bullpen catcher); **60-day injured list**: 99 Spencer Strider; **Restricted list**: 17 Jurickson Profar; 38 active, 0 inactive, 2 non-roster invitees; 7-, 10-, or 15-day injured list; * Not on active roster; ^{†} Suspended list; Roster, coaches, and NRIs updated November 19, 2026; Transactions • Depth chart; → All MLB rosters

=== Achievements ===
==== Awards ====
Braves players have won seven Most Valuable Player (MVP) awards, with Dale Murphy notably earning the honor in back-to-back years, 1982 and 1983. Five Braves pitchers have received the Cy Young Award, given to the league's best pitcher, including Greg Maddux, who won it three consecutive times in 1993, 1994, and 1995.

Two Braves managers have been named Manager of the Year, with Bobby Cox winning the award three times, in 1991, 2004, and 2005. Additionally, eight Braves players have been honored with the Rookie of the Year awards.

=== Retired numbers ===
The Braves have retired eleven numbers in the history of the franchise. Most recently, Andruw Jones' number 25 was retired in 2023. Other retired numbers include Chipper Jones' number 10, John Smoltz's number 29, Bobby Cox's number 6, Tom Glavine's number 47, and Greg Maddux's number 31. Additionally, the Braves have retired Hank Aaron's number 44, Dale Murphy's number 3, Phil Niekro's number 35, Eddie Mathews' number 41, and Warren Spahn's number 21. Jackie Robinson's number 42 is also retired across all of Major League Baseball, with the exception of Jackie Robinson Day.

Six of the eleven numbers (Cox, Chipper Jones, Andruw Jones, Smoltz, Maddux, and Glavine) were on the Braves at the same time. Of the eleven Braves whose numbers have been retired, all who are eligible for the National Baseball Hall of Fame have been elected, with the exception of Dale Murphy. The color and design of the retired numbers on commemorative markers and other in-stadium signage reflect the primary uniform design at the time the player was on the team.

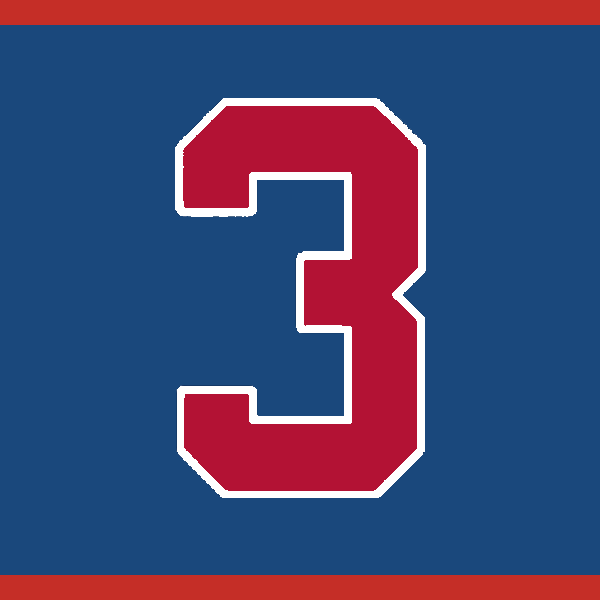
Dale
Murphy
OF
Retired June 13, 1994
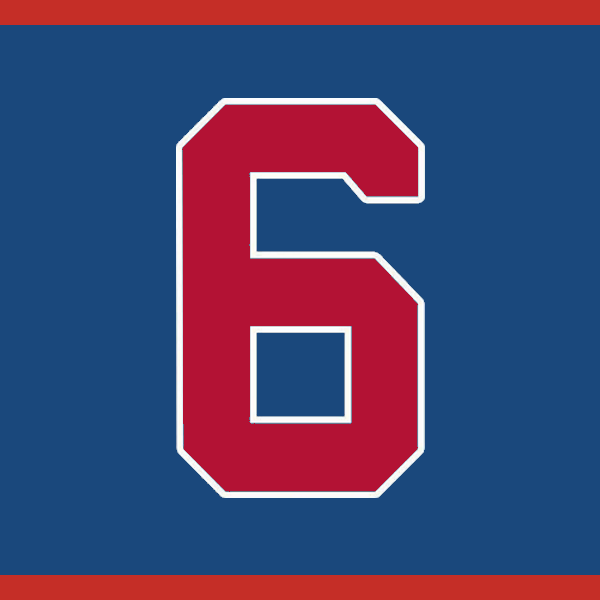
Bobby
Cox
Mgr
Retired August 12, 2011
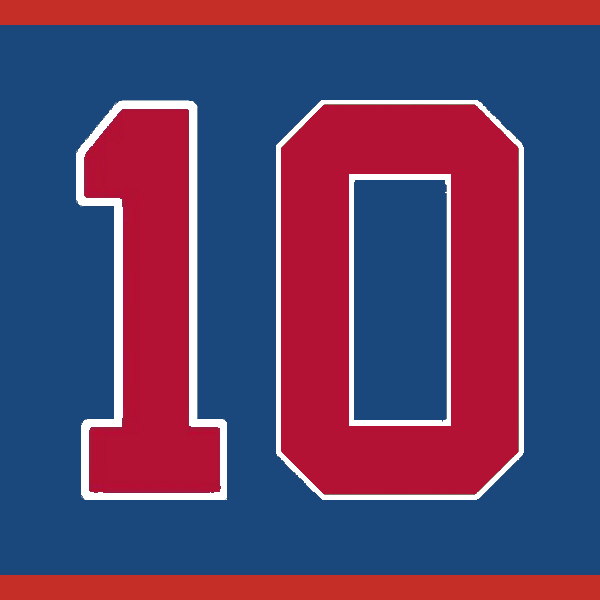
Chipper
Jones
3B
Retired June 28, 2013
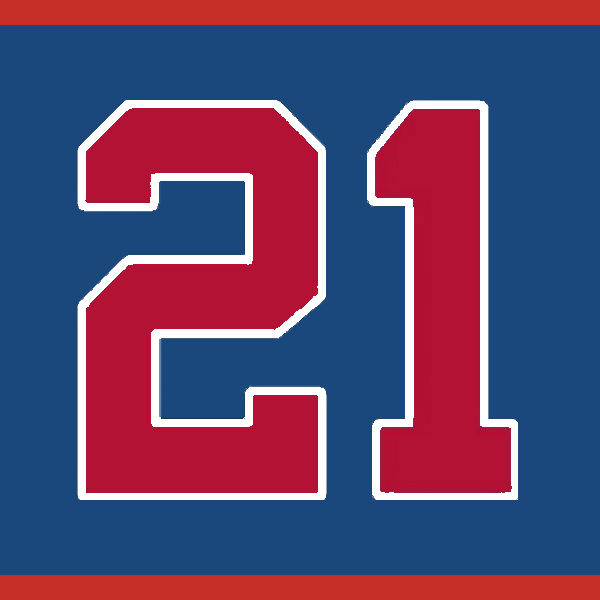
Warren
Spahn
P
Retired December 11, 1965
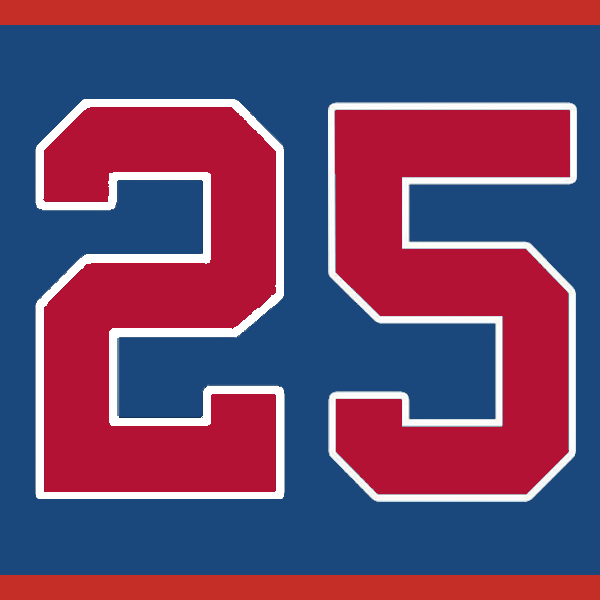
Andruw
Jones
OF
Retired September 9, 2023
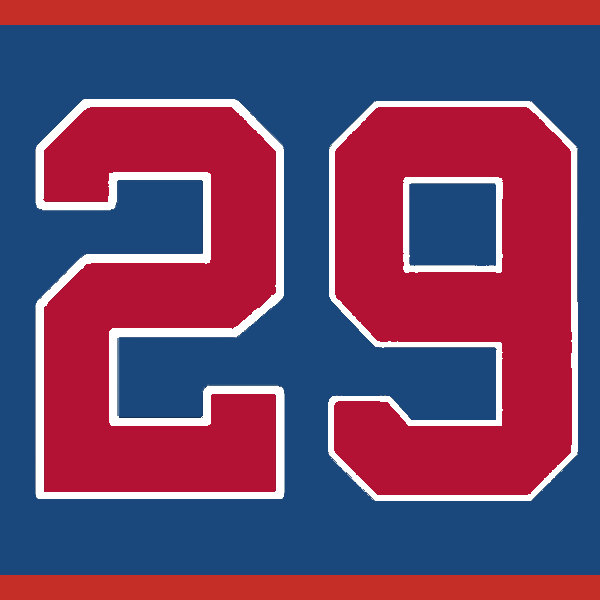
John
Smoltz
P
Retired June 8, 2012
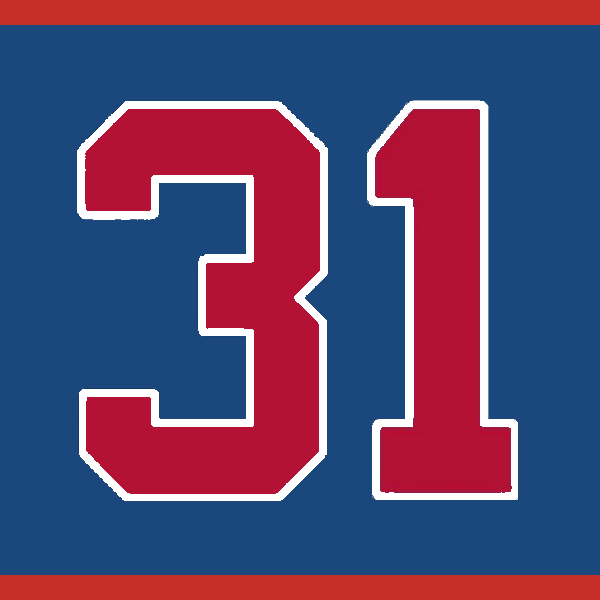
Greg
Maddux
P
Retired July 17, 2009
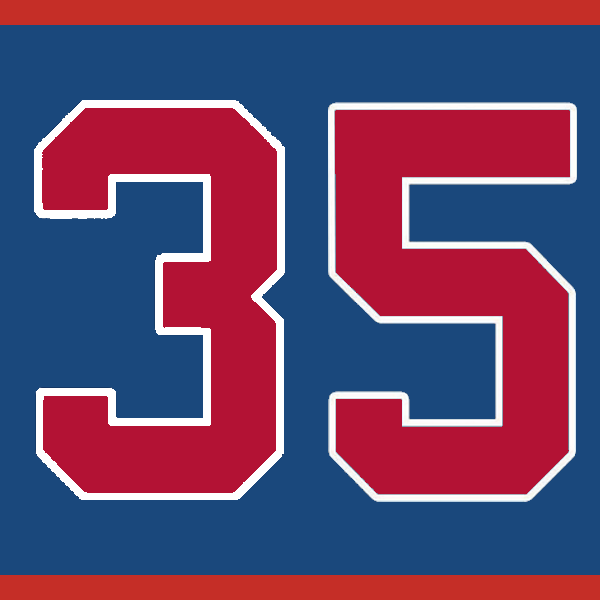
Phil
Niekro
P
Retired August 6, 1984
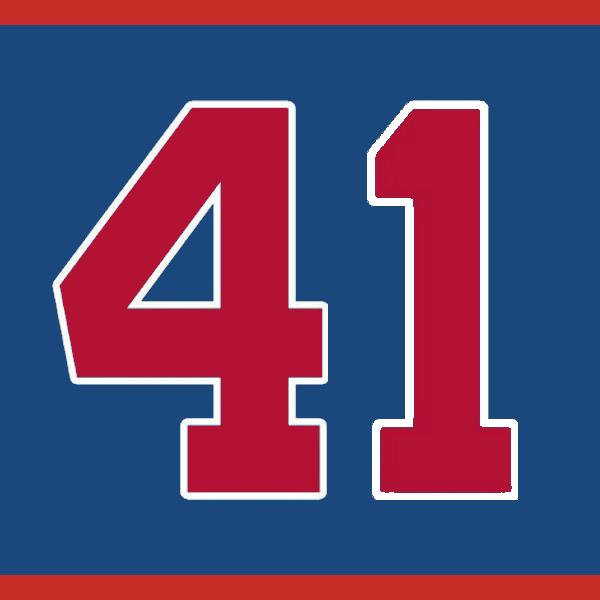
Eddie
Mathews
3B
Retired July 26, 1969
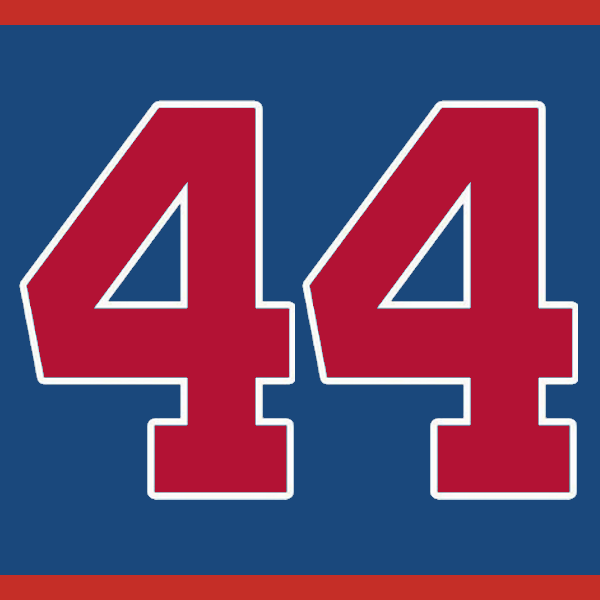
Hank
Aaron
RF
Retired April 15, 1977
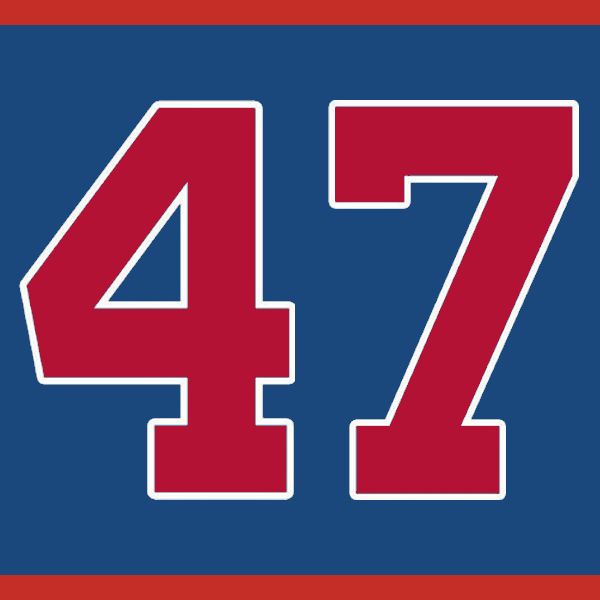
Tom
Glavine
P
Retired August 6, 2010
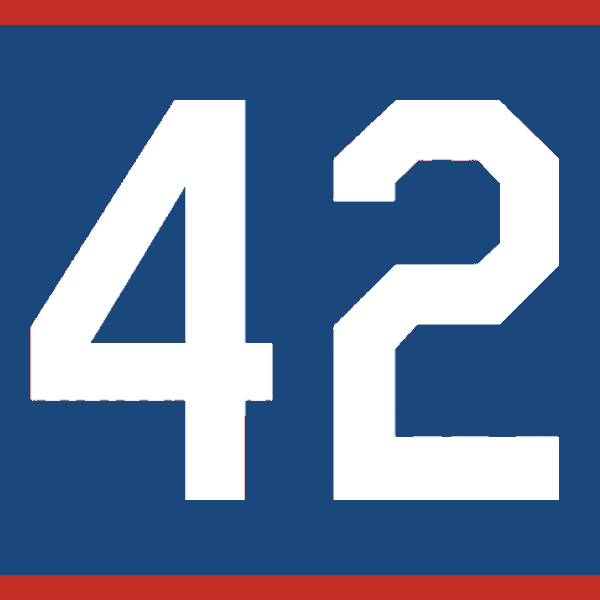
Jackie
Robinson
All MLB
Honored April 15, 1997

=== Baseball Hall of Famers ===
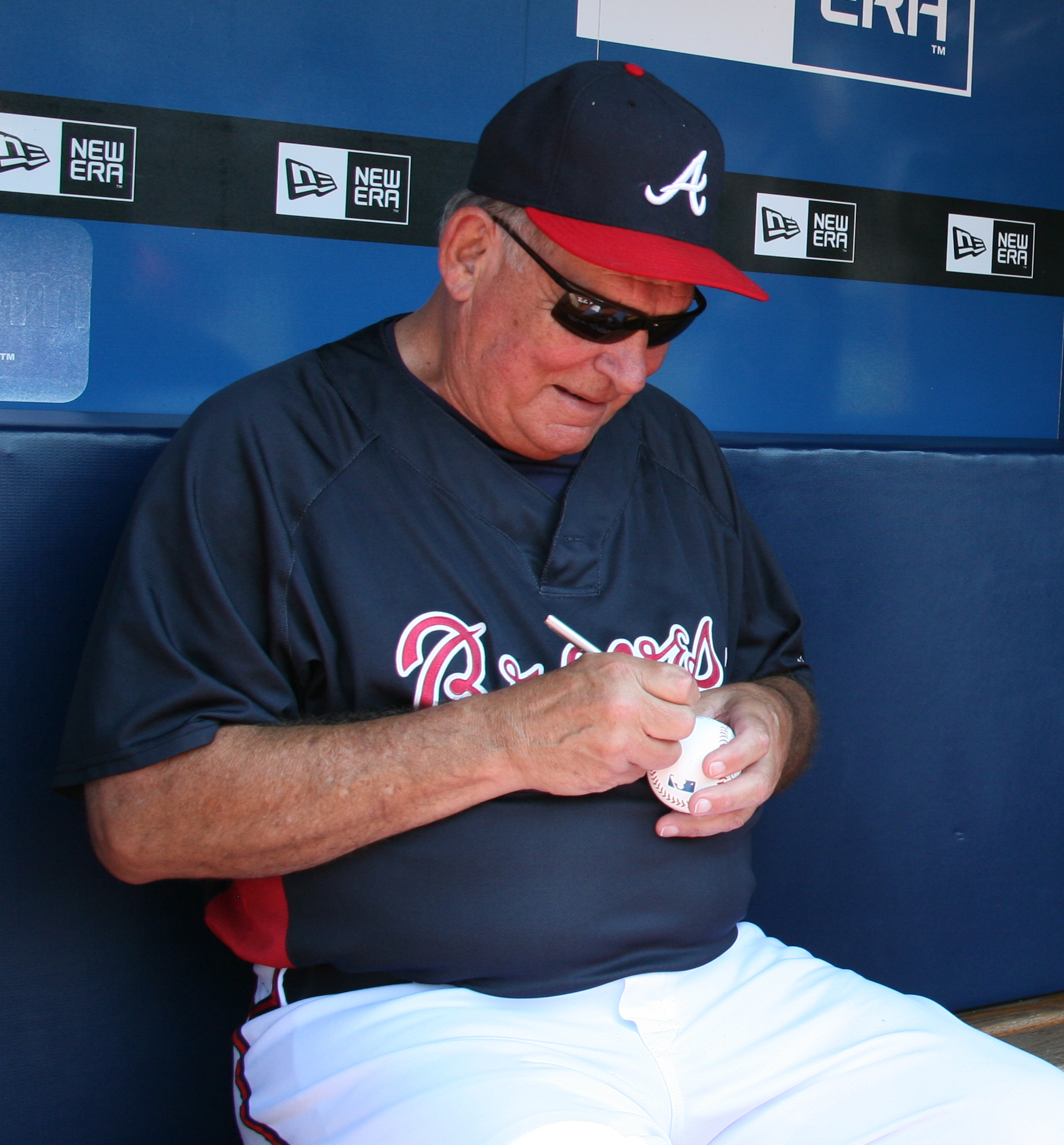
Bobby Cox

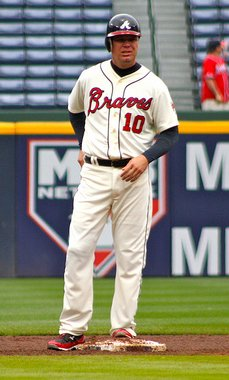
Chipper Jones

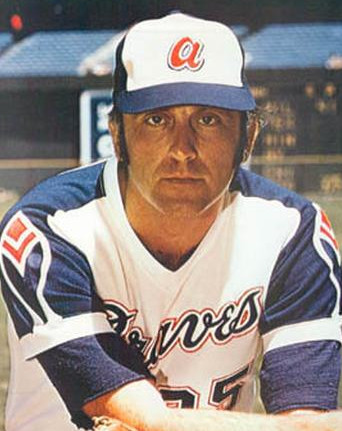
Phil Niekro

Atlanta Braves Hall of Famers
Affiliation according to the National Baseball Hall of Fame and Museum
Boston Braves

Earl Averill
Dave Bancroft
Dan Brouthers
**John Clarkson** *
Jimmy Collins
**Hugh Duffy** *
Johnny Evers

Burleigh Grimes
Billy Hamilton
Billy Herman
Rogers Hornsby
Joe Kelley
King Kelly
Ernie Lombardi
Al López

**Rabbit Maranville** *
Rube Marquard
**Tommy McCarthy** *
Bill McKechnie
Joe Medwick
**Kid Nichols** *
Jim O'Rourke

Charles Radbourn
Babe Ruth
Frank Selee *
Al Simmons
George Sisler
Billy Southworth
Casey Stengel
Ed Walsh

Lloyd Waner
Paul Waner
Deacon White
Vic Willis *
George Wright *
Harry Wright
Cy Young

Milwaukee Braves

**Hank Aaron** *^{†}

**Eddie Mathews** *

Red Schoendienst

Enos Slaughter

**Warren Spahn** *

Atlanta Braves

Orlando Cepeda
**Bobby Cox** *
**Tom Glavine** *

**Andruw Jones** *
**Chipper Jones** *
Greg Maddux *

Fred McGriff *
**Phil Niekro** *
Gaylord Perry
John Schuerholz

Ted Simmons
**John Smoltz** *
Bruce Sutter

Joe Torre
Billy Wagner
Hoyt Wilhelm

- Players and managers listed in **bold** are depicted on their Hall of Fame plaques wearing a Braves cap insignia.
- * Boston / Milwaukee / Atlanta Braves listed as primary team according to the Hall of Fame
- † Hank Aaron chose to represent the Atlanta Braves on his HOF cap insignia, but the HOF lists the Milwaukee Braves as his primary team

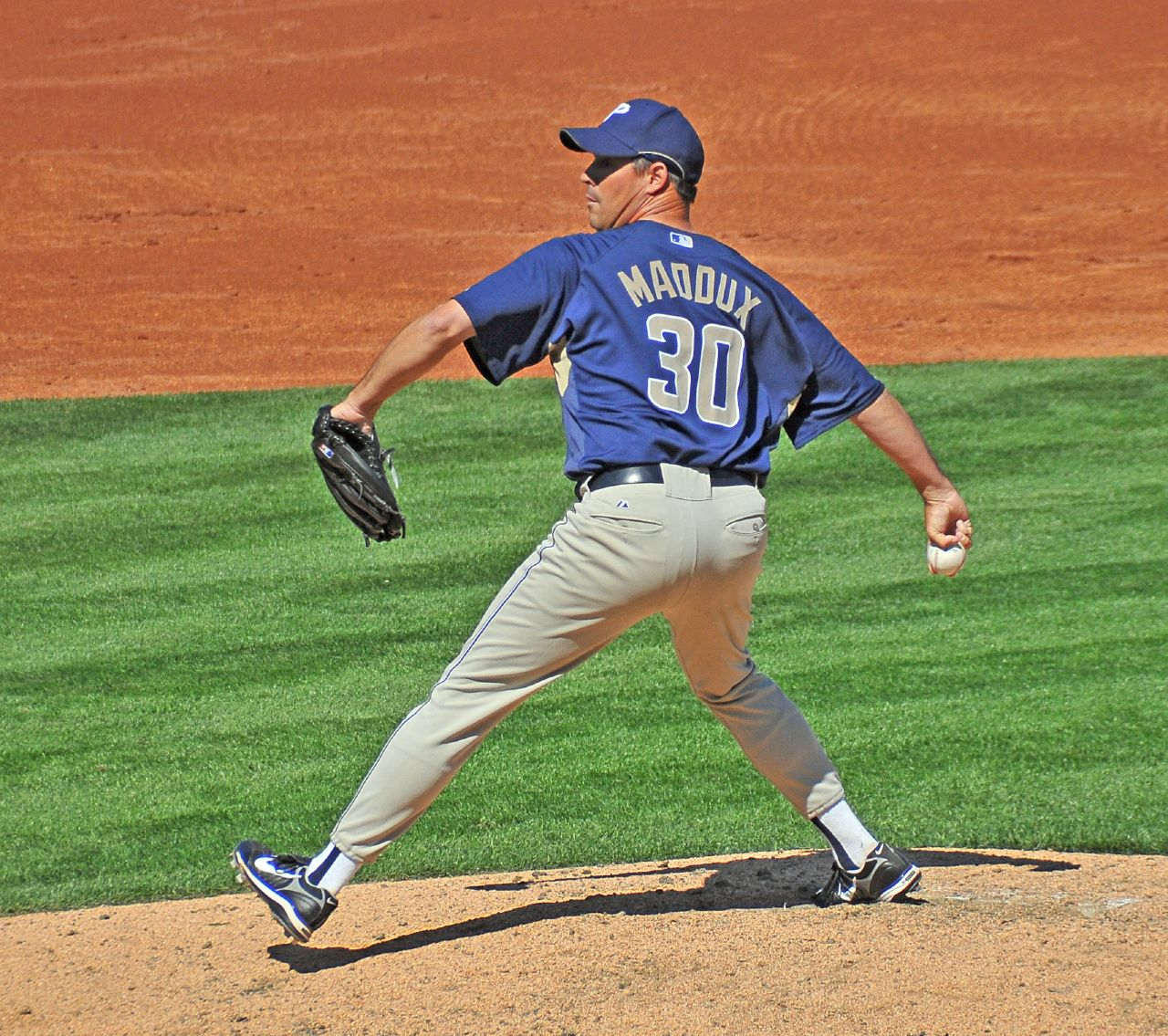
P Greg Maddux, Hall of Famer

=== Braves Hall of Fame ===
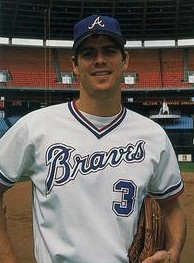
2× MVP Dale Murphy, outfielder

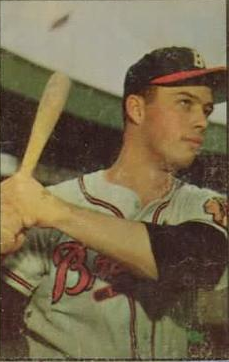
3B Eddie Mathews, Hall of Famer

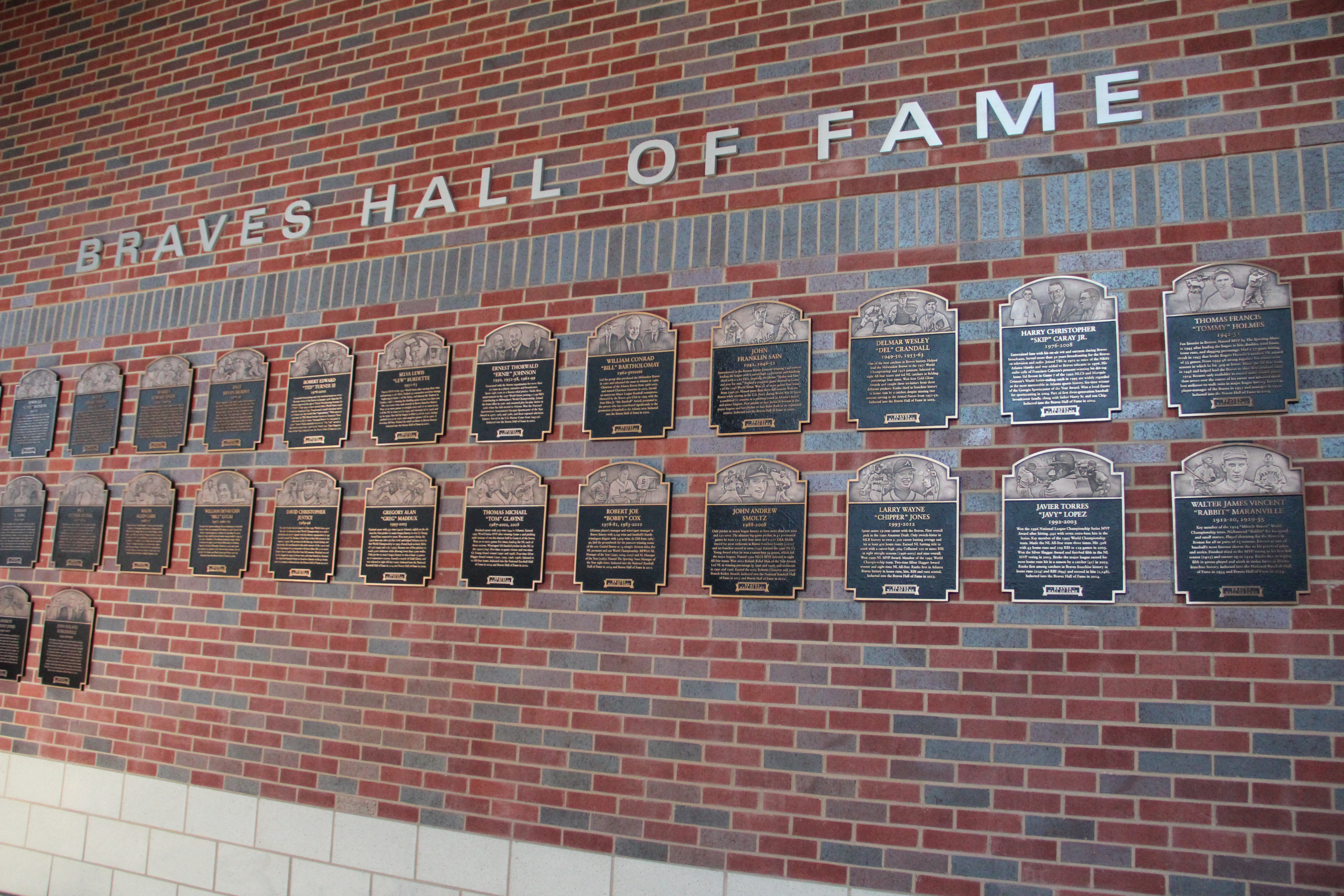
Braves Hall of Fame wall at Truist Park

Key
Year	Year inducted
**Bold**	Member of the Baseball Hall of Fame
†	Member of the Baseball Hall of Fame as a Brave
**Bold**	Recipient of the Hall of Fame's Ford C. Frick Award

**Braves Hall of Fame**
Year	No.	Name	Position(s)	Tenure
1999	21	**Warren Spahn**^{†}	P	1942, 1946–1964
1999	35	**Phil Niekro**^{†}	P	1964–1983, 1987
1999	41	**Eddie Mathews**^{†}	3B; Manager	1952–1966; 1972–1974
1999	44	**Hank Aaron**^{†}	RF	1954–1974
2000	27	Ted Turner	Owner; President; Manager	1976–1996
2000	3	Dale Murphy	OF	1976–1990
2001	32	Ernie Johnson Sr.	P Broadcaster	1950, 1952–1958; 1962–1999
2002	28, 33	Johnny Sain	P Coach	1942, 1946–1951; 1977, 1985–1986
2002	—	Bill Bartholomay	Owner/President	1962–1976
2003	1, 23	Del Crandall	C	1949–1963
2004	—	Pete Van Wieren	Broadcaster	1976–2008
2004	—	**Kid Nichols**^{†}	P	1890–1901
2004	1	Tommy Holmes	OF; Manager	1942–1951; 1951–1952
2004	—	Skip Caray	Broadcaster	1976–2008
2005	—	Paul Snyder	Executive	1973–2007
2005	—	Herman Long	SS	1890–1902
2006	—	Bill Lucas	GM	1976–1979
2006	11, 48	Ralph Garr	OF	1968–1975
2007	23	David Justice	OF	1989–1996
2009	31	**Greg Maddux**	P	1993–2003
2010	47	**Tom Glavine**^{†}	P	1987–2002, 2008
2011	6	**Bobby Cox**^{†}	Manager	1978–1981, 1990–2010
2012	29	**John Smoltz**^{†}	P	1988–1999, 2001–2008
2013	10	**Chipper Jones**^{†}	3B/LF	1993–2012
2014	8	Javy López	C	1992–2003
2014	1	**Rabbit Maranville**^{†}	SS/2B	1912–1920; 1929–1933, 1935
2014	—	Dave Pursley	Trainer	1961–2002
2015	—	**Don Sutton**	Broadcaster	1989–2006, 2009–2020
2016	25	**Andruw Jones**^{†}	CF	1996–2007
2016	—	**John Schuerholz**	Executive	1990–2016
2018	15	Tim Hudson	P	2005–2013
2018	—	Joe Simpson	Broadcaster	1992–present
2019	—	**Hugh Duffy**	OF	1892–1900
2019	5, 9	Terry Pendleton	3B; Coach	1991–1994, 1996; 2002–2017
2022	9	Joe Adcock	1B/OF	1953–1962
2022	54	Leo Mazzone	Coach	1990–2005
2022	9, 15	**Joe Torre**	C/1B/3B; Manager	1960–1968; 1982–1984
2023	25, 43, 77	Rico Carty	LF	1963–1972
2023	—	Fred Tenney	1B	1894–1907, 1911
2024	—	**Harry Wright**	CF; Manager	1871–1877; 1871–1881
2025	3, 4	Wally Berger	CF	1930–1937
2026	43	Brian Snitker	Manager	2016–2025

== Minor league affiliates ==
The Atlanta Braves farm system consists of six minor league affiliates.

Class	Team	League	Location	Ballpark	Affiliated
Triple-A	Gwinnett Stripers	International League	Lawrenceville, Georgia	Coolray Field	2009
Double-A	Columbus Clingstones	Southern League	Columbus, Georgia	Synovus Park	2025
High-A	Rome Emperors	South Atlantic League	Rome, Georgia	AdventHealth Stadium	2003
Single-A	Augusta GreenJackets	Carolina League	North Augusta, South Carolina	SRP Park	2021
Rookie	FCL Braves	Florida Complex League	North Port, Florida	CoolToday Park	1976
Rookie	DSL Braves	Dominican Summer League	Boca Chica, Santo Domingo	Atlanta Braves Complex	2022

== Radio and television ==
As of the 2026 season, the Atlanta Braves' regional rights will be held in-house by the team under the banner BravesVision. Games will be distributed via partnerships with television providers in the team's market, as well as via a direct-to-consumer streaming service operated by MLB Local Media. Selected games are carried by a network of Gray Media television stations, led by WPCH-TV (the former WTBS). Gray produces a package of spring training games, and carrying a package of regular season games in simulcast with BravesVision.

Brandon Gaudin serves as the play-by-play announcer and C.J. Nitkowski as lead analyst. Jeff Francoeur and Tom Glavine will also join the broadcast for a few games during the season. Peter Moylan, Nick Green, and John Smoltz also appear in the booth for select games as in-game analysts.

The radio broadcast team is led by the tandem of play-by-play announcer Ben Ingram and analyst Joe Simpson. Braves games are broadcast across Georgia and seven other states on at least 172 radio affiliates, including flagship station 680 The Fan in Atlanta and stations as far away as Richmond, Virginia; Louisville, Kentucky; and the US Virgin Islands. The games are carried on at least 82 radio stations in Georgia.

Awards and achievements
Preceded by Philadelphia Athletics; 1913	World Series champions Boston Braves; 1914	Succeeded by Boston Red Sox; 1915
Preceded by New York Yankees; 1956	World Series champions Milwaukee Braves; 1957	Succeeded by New York Yankees; 1958
Preceded by Toronto Blue Jays; 1993	World Series champions Atlanta Braves; 1995	Succeeded by New York Yankees; 1996
Preceded by Los Angeles Dodgers; 2020	World Series champions Atlanta Braves; 2021	Succeeded by Houston Astros; 2022
Preceded by Chicago White Stockings; 1876	National League champions Boston Red Caps; 1877–1878	Succeeded by Providence Grays; 1879
Preceded by Chicago White Stockings; 1882	National League champions Boston Beaneaters; 1883	Succeeded by Providence Grays; 1884
Preceded by Brooklyn Bridegrooms; 1890	National League champions Boston Beaneaters; 1891–1893	Succeeded by Baltimore Orioles; 1894
Preceded by Baltimore Orioles; 1896	National League champions Boston Beaneaters; 1897–1898	Succeeded by Brooklyn Superbas; 1899
Preceded by New York Giants; 1913	National League champions Boston Braves; 1914	Succeeded by Philadelphia Phillies; 1915
Preceded by Brooklyn Dodgers; 1947	National League champions Boston Braves; 1948	Succeeded by Brooklyn Dodgers; 1949
Preceded by Brooklyn Dodgers; 1956	National League champions Milwaukee Braves; 1957–1958	Succeeded by Los Angeles Dodgers; 1959
Preceded by Cincinnati Reds; 1990	National League champions Atlanta Braves; 1991–1992	Succeeded by Philadelphia Phillies; 1993
Preceded by Philadelphia Phillies; 1993	National League champions Atlanta Braves; 1995–1996	Succeeded by Florida Marlins; 1997
Preceded by San Diego Padres; 1998	National League champions Atlanta Braves; 1999	Succeeded by New York Mets; 2000
Preceded by Los Angeles Dodgers; 2020	National League champions Atlanta Braves; 2021	Succeeded by Philadelphia Phillies; 2022
