= 1973 Baseball Hall of Fame balloting =

Elections to the Baseball Hall of Fame

National Baseball

Hall of Fame and Museum
- New inductees: 6
- via BBWAA: 1
- via Special Election: 1
- via Veterans Committee: 3
- via Negro Leagues Committee: 1
- Total inductees: 140
- Induction date: August 6, 1973

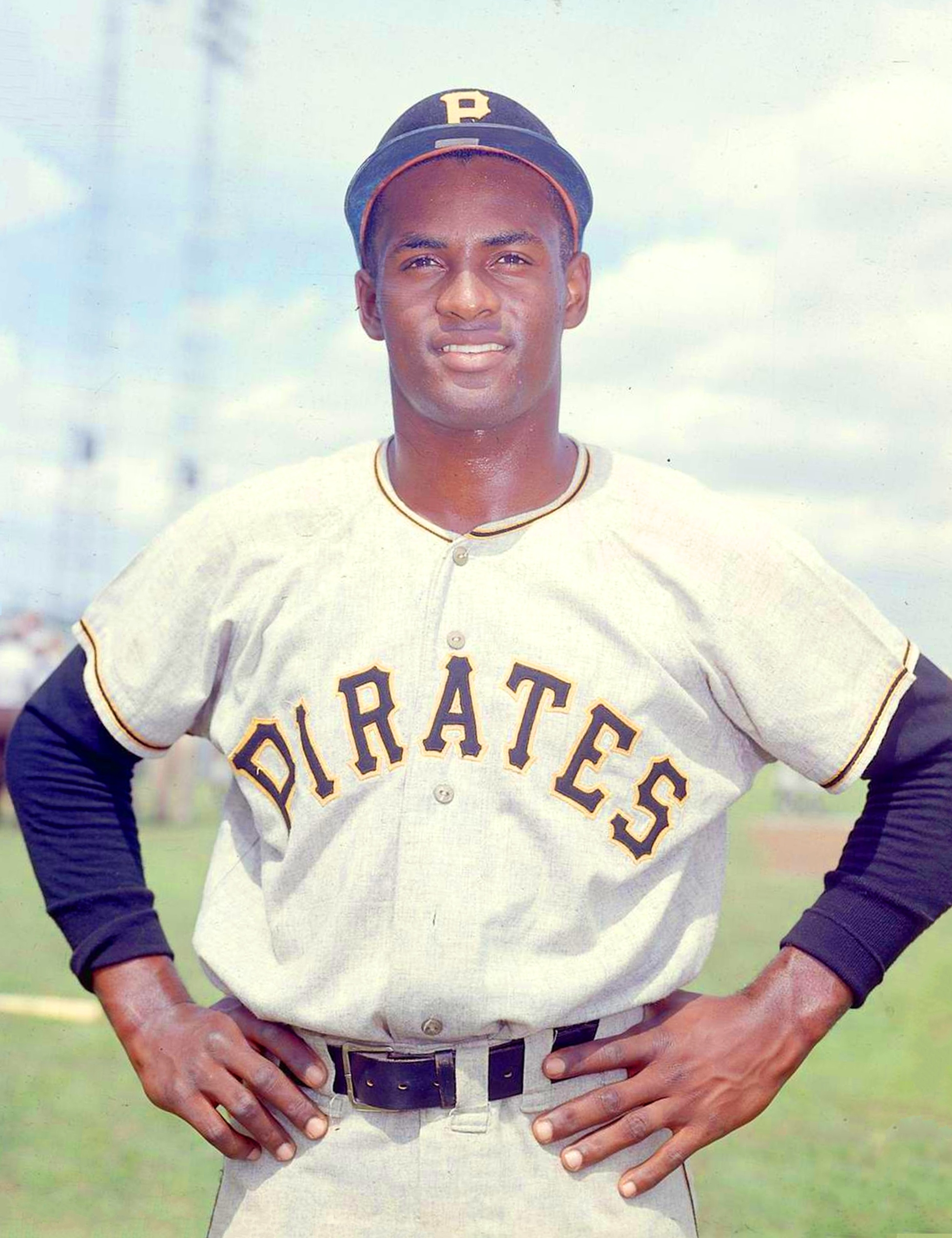
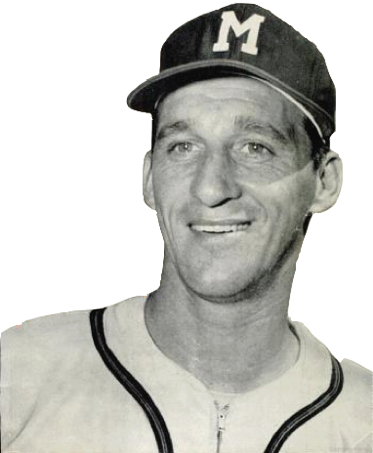
1973 BBWAA inductees Roberto Clemente (left) and Warren Spahn

Elections to the Baseball Hall of Fame for 1973 followed the system in place since 1971, plus the special election of Roberto Clemente, who had died in a plane crash on New Year's Eve. The Baseball Writers' Association of America (BBWAA) voted by mail to select from recent major league players and elected Warren Spahn. The Veterans Committee met in closed sessions to consider executives, managers, umpires, and earlier major league players. It selected three people: Billy Evans, George Kelly, and Mickey Welch. The Negro Leagues Committee also met in person and selected Monte Irvin. A formal induction ceremony was held in Cooperstown, New York, on August 6, 1973, with Commissioner of Baseball Bowie Kuhn presiding.

== BBWAA election ==
The BBWAA was authorized to elect players active in 1953 or later, but not after 1967; the ballot included candidates from the 1972 ballot who received at least 5% of the vote but were not elected, along with selected players, chosen by a screening committee, whose last appearance was in 1967. All 10-year members of the BBWAA were eligible to vote.

Voters were instructed to cast votes for up to 10 candidates; any candidate receiving votes on at least 75% of the ballots would be honored with induction to the Hall. Results of the 1973 election by the BBWAA were announced on January 24. The ballot consisted of 44 players; a total of 380 ballots were cast, with 285 votes required for election. A total of 3,044 individual votes were cast, an average of 8.01 per ballot. Those candidates receiving less than 5% of the vote will not appear on future BBWAA ballots but may eventually be considered by the Veterans Committee.

Candidates who were eligible for the first time are indicated here with a dagger (†). The one candidate who received at least 75% of the vote and was elected is indicated in bold italics; candidates who have since been elected in subsequent elections are indicated in italics.

The top two vote getters were first-year candidates. One of them, Warren Spahn, was elected to the Hall of Fame. Johnny Mize, Marty Marion, Dom DiMaggio, Bobo Newsom, Dutch Leonard, and Harry Brecheen were on the ballot for the final time.

| Player | Votes | Percent | Change |
|---|---|---|---|
| **Warren Spahn**† | 316 | 83.2 | - |
| Whitey Ford† | 255 | 67.1 | - |
| Ralph Kiner | 235 | 61.8 | ▲2.5% |
| Gil Hodges | 218 | 57.4 | ▲16.7% |
| Robin Roberts† | 213 | 56.1 | - |
| Bob Lemon | 177 | 46.6 | ▲17.1% |
| Johnny Mize | 157 | 41.3 | ▲1.7% |
| Enos Slaughter | 145 | 38.2 | ▲0.6% |
| Marty Marion | 127 | 33.4 | ▲3.1% |
| Pee Wee Reese | 126 | 33.2 | ▲0.6% |
| George Kell | 114 | 30.0 | ▲1.0% |
| Phil Rizzuto | 111 | 29.2 | ▲3.2% |
| Duke Snider | 101 | 26.6 | ▲5.4% |
| Red Schoendienst | 96 | 25.3 | ▼1.0% |
| Allie Reynolds | 93 | 24.5 | ▼2.0% |
| Hal Newhouser | 79 | 20.8 | ▼2.4% |
| Phil Cavarretta | 73 | 19.2 | ▲3.8% |
| Nellie Fox | 73 | 19.2 | ▲3.0% |
| Alvin Dark | 53 | 13.9 | - |
| Johnny Sain | 47 | 12.4 | ▲7.1% |
| Dom DiMaggio | 43 | 11.3 | ▲2.2% |
| Bobo Newsom | 33 | 11.3 | ▲0.9% |
| Richie Ashburn | 25 | 6.6 | ▲3.8% |
| Mickey Vernon | 23 | 6.1 | ▲3.1% |
| Ted Kluszewski | 14 | 3.7 | ▲1.2% |
| Lew Burdette† | 12 | 3.2 | - |
| Don Newcombe | 11 | 2.9 | ▲1.1% |
| Vern Law† | 9 | 2.4 | - |
| Walker Cooper | 8 | 2.1 | ▲0.1% |
| Dick Groat† | 7 | 1.8 | - |
| Vic Raschi | 7 | 1.8 | ▲0.8% |
| Dutch Leonard | 6 | 1.6 | ▲0.3% |
| Roy McMillan | 5 | 1.3 | ▼1.0% |
| Bobby Shantz | 5 | 1.3 | ▼1.0% |
| Curt Simmons† | 5 | 1.3 | - |
| Carl Erskine | 4 | 1.1 | ▲0.1% |
| Billy Pierce | 4 | 1.1 | ▲0.1% |
| Harry Brecheen | 3 | 0.8 | ▼0.5% |
| Bobby Thomson | 3 | 0.8 | ▼1.7% |
| Gil McDougald | 2 | 0.5 | ▼0.5% |
| Bobby Richardson | 2 | 0.5 | ▼1.5% |
| Vic Wertz | 2 | 0.5 | ▼0.5% |
| Smoky Burgess† | 1 | 0.3 | - |
| Harvey Haddix | 1 | 0.3 | ▼2.0% |

Key to colors
| | Elected to the Hall. These individuals are also indicated in **bold italics**. |
| | Players who were elected in future elections. These individuals are also indicated in plain italics. |
| | Players not yet elected who returned on the 1974 ballot. |
| | Eliminated from future BBWAA voting. These individuals remain eligible for future Veterans Committee consideration. |
| † | First time on the BBWAA ballot. |

The newly-eligible players included 24 All-Stars, 16 of whom were not included on the ballot, representing a total of 95 All-Star selections. Among the new candidates were 17-time All-Star Warren Spahn, 10-time All-Star Whitey Ford, 9-time All-Star Smoky Burgess, 8-time All-Stars Dick Groat and Bill Skowron, 7-time All-Star Robin Roberts, and 5-time All-Star Earl Battey.

Players eligible for the first time who were not included on the ballot were: Joey Amalfitano, Earl Battey, Jackie Brandt, Eddie Bressoud, Bob Buhl, Don Demeter, Rubén Gómez, Jim King, Johnny Klippstein, Jim Landis, Barry Latman, Charley Lau, Bob Lillis, Jerry Lumpe, Billy O'Dell, Jim O'Toole, Jim Owens, Jimmy Piersall, Andre Rodgers, Johnny Romano, Jack Sanford, Bob Shaw, Bill Skowron, Ralph Terry, and Hal Woodeshick.

== Special election of Roberto Clemente ==
On March 20, the BBWAA held a special election for Roberto Clemente, who had died in a plane crash on December 31, 1972. Clemente was elected after receiving 393 votes out of 424 ballots cast.

== Veterans Committee ==
The 12-member Veterans Committee met in January 1973 to consider executives, managers, umpires, and earlier major league players, for election. It selected umpire Billy Evans, early 20th century player George Kelly, and 19th century player Mickey Welch. Kelly was cited by writer Bill James as the worst player in the Baseball Hall of Fame. Two of Kelly's old teammates, Frankie Frisch and Bill Terry, were on the committee that elected him. From the 1960s to the 1980s, the Veterans Committee made several controversial selections that were attributed to cronyism and which eventually led to the Veterans Committee having their power reduced.

== J. G. Taylor Spink Award ==
Dan Daniel (1890–1981), Fred Lieb (1888–1980), and J. Roy Stockton (1892–1972) received the J. G. Taylor Spink Award honoring baseball writers. The awards were voted at the December 1972 meeting of the BBWAA, and included in the summer 1973 ceremonies. Daniel and Lieb, the first living recipients of the award, accepted in person.
