= America's Team =

Nickname for the Dallas Cowboys

The term "America's Team" is a nickname of the National Football League (NFL)'s Dallas Cowboys. Coined in 1978, the nickname is used by team marketers, the NFL, and media outlets such as ESPN, Yahoo!, HBO, and Sports Illustrated.

== History ==
The nickname first appeared in the team's 1978 highlight film, whose narration opens with: "They appear on television so often that their faces are as familiar to the public as presidents and movie stars. They are the Dallas Cowboys: 'America's Team'".

The line was written by Bob Ryan, who produced the film and later became vice president and editor-in-chief of NFL Films. He told an interviewer:

I wanted to come up with a different twist on their team highlight film. I noticed then, and had noticed earlier, that wherever the Cowboys played, you saw people in the stands with Cowboys jerseys and hats and pennants. Plus, they were always the national game on television.

Ryan told another interviewer:

I saw all these fans in away stadiums. Hey, they're the most popular team in the country. How can I use that? Why don't we call them "America's Team"?

An early prominent use of the nickname came when CBS television announcer Pat Summerall introduced the Cowboys as "America's Team" during their first game of the 1979 season, a nationally televised game against the St. Louis Cardinals that Dallas won 22–21.

The nickname was coined at the height of Dallas head coach Tom Landry's NFL-record streak of 20 consecutive winning seasons, during which Dallas appeared in 12 conference championship games (counting the 1966 and 1967 league championships) and five Super Bowls, and was exemplified on the field by future Hall of Fame quarterback Roger Staubach. Landry did not initially approve of the nickname, which he believed would help motivate opposing teams to play harder, but later came to like it.

== Records and media ==
NFL Films The Dallas Cowboys
- The Dallas Cowboys: The Complete History of America's Team 1960–2003 DVD Cover
- Directed by: NFL Films
- Starring: The Dallas Cowboys
- Distributed by: Warner Home Video
- Release date: November 25, 2003
- Running time: 73:00
- Language: English

In 2012, an ESPN poll found that the Cowboys are the most popular NFL team, a result consistently echoed in annual Harris polling.

The Cowboys hold several records attesting to their national popularity. They are the team with the most consecutive sold-out games, including home and away games, with 160 (from December 23, 1990, at Philadelphia's Veterans Stadium and came to an end on December 24, 1999, in a Christmas Eve game against the New Orleans Saints in the Louisiana Superdome).

Cowboys games have set television ratings records, including seven of their eight Super Bowl appearances and the NFC Championship Game between the Cowboys and 49ers, the only non-Super Bowl NFL game to be ranked in the top 45 primetime Telecasts of All Time. Cowboys games are consistently in primetime or the national doubleheader slot, no matter how their season is going. They rarely air in a 1 p.m. (Eastern time) regional game.

Dallas is the only NFL team that distributes its own merchandise, which remains among the league's top-selling even during losing seasons.

As of 2012 the Cowboys were the most valuable American sports franchise at $2.1 billion.

The Cowboys' cheerleader squad, dubbed "America's Sweethearts", has been widely copied around the NFL; widely featured in other media, including movies, television, and its own long running reality show on CMT; and been in wide demand for other appearances, including USO tours and other appearances around the world.

The NFL has put its imprimatur on the nickname; in 2003, NFL Films released a DVD collection The Dallas Cowboys: The Complete History of America's Team 1960–2003. In 2008, NFL Films released an updated version.

== Other uses ==
Franchises with long successful histories and large nationwide fan bases are occasionally referred to as America's Team.

The Atlanta Braves laid claim to the name because their games were broadcast nationwide on the TBS cable television channel from 1977 to 2007, building a fan base in areas of the United States far removed from a Major League Baseball team. A 1982 issue of Sports Illustrated referred to the Braves as "America's Team II".

As a jab against the Cowboys before Super Bowl XXVII, Buffalo Bills coach Marv Levy proclaimed his team to be America's Team because they would be "wearing red, white, and blue". The Cowboys, whose team colors are navy blue, silver and white, went on to defeat the Bills 52–17.

Pittsburgh Steelers owner Art Rooney dismissed the suggestion that the Steelers were "America's Team." " 'We didn't want that,' Rooney said. 'We're Pittsburgh's team. We feel strongly about that.' " This was reiterated by Pittsburgh native and former Cowboys assistant coach Dave Wannstedt during a 2016 segment on Fox NFL Kickoff when covering the upcoming matchup between the two teams when he revealed that the nickname was actually offered to the Steelers first by NFL commissioner Pete Rozelle following the Steelers victory over the Cowboys in Super Bowl X, only to be declined by Rooney.

In a 2009 ESPN.com article, "The Great Debate: 'America's Team'," four sports writers stated their case as to why three other teams besides the Cowboys could lay claim to the nickname of America's Team.

- James Walker said the name should be given to the Pittsburgh Steelers since they have the most Super Bowl wins at six. (This record has since been tied by the New England Patriots.)
- Kevin Seifert said that the Green Bay Packers could be considered America's Team due to their unique ownership situation. They "are now owned by 112,120 shareholders who possess about 4.75 million shares of capital stock. A seven-member executive committee, elected by the board of directors and comprised mostly of local residents, operates the team."
- Tim Graham said the New England Patriots have a right at the name since they dominated the NFL for the entire first decade of the new millennium, by virtue of their team name and colors (red, white and blue) and having been formed in Boston, the "Cradle of Liberty".

After the New Orleans Saints won Super Bowl XLIV, a few media writers called them "America's Team" because they appeared to represent the city's resurgence after the devastation of Hurricane Katrina ("for one game, the Saints are America's Team").

The Gonzaga Bulldogs men's basketball team has been called "America's Team" after "Cinderella" runs in the NCAA tournament.

During their ArenaBowl XXII championship run in 2008, Philadelphia Soul owner Ron Jaworski referred to the Soul as "America's Team" of the Arena Football League.

During their 2020 season, Coastal Carolina Head Coach Jamey Chadwell referred to the Chanticleers as America's team.

After the Philadelphia Eagles won Super Bowl LIX, their second title in seven seasons, Pennsylvania governor Josh Shapiro called the Eagles "America's Team" during a speech at the team's championship parade. The proclamation was seen as "trolling" the Cowboys, a rival of the Eagles. Eagles fans in the crowd responded to Shapiro's statement by chanting, "Dallas sucks!"
