= Warren Spahn =

American baseball player (1921–2003)

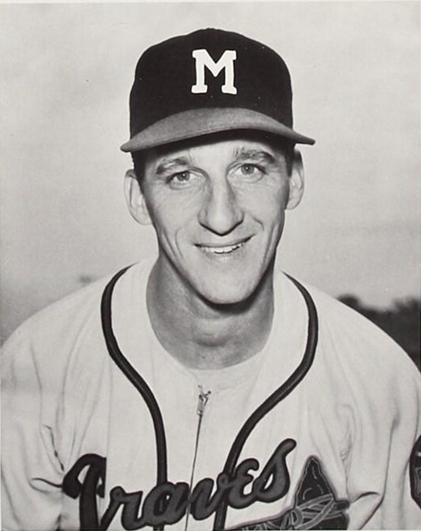
- Spahn with the Milwaukee Braves in 1961
- Pitcher
- Born: April 23, 1921; Buffalo, New York, U.S.
- Died: November 24, 2003 (aged 82); Broken Arrow, Oklahoma, U.S.
- Batted: Left Threw: Left

MLB debut
- April 19, 1942, for the Boston Braves

Last MLB appearance
- October 1, 1965, for the San Francisco Giants

MLB statistics
- Win–loss record: 363–245
- Earned run average: 3.09
- Strikeouts: 2,583
- Stats at Baseball Reference

Teams
- Boston / Milwaukee Braves (1942, 1946–1964); New York Mets (1965); San Francisco Giants (1965)

Career highlights and awards
- 17× All-Star (1947, 1949–1954, 1956–1959², 1961–1963); World Series champion (1957); Cy Young Award (1957); 8× NL wins leader (1949, 1950, 1953, 1957–1961); 3× NL ERA leader (1947, 1953, 1961); 4× NL strikeout leader (1949–1952); Pitched two no-hitters; Atlanta Braves No. 21 retired; Braves Hall of Fame; American Family Field Walk of Fame; Major League Baseball All-Century Team

Member of the National

Baseball Hall of Fame
- Induction: 1973
- Vote: 83.2% (first ballot)

Warren Edward Spahn (April 23, 1921 – November 24, 2003) was an American professional baseball pitcher who played 21 seasons in Major League Baseball (MLB). A left-handed pitcher, Spahn played in 1942 and then from 1946 until 1965, most notably for the Boston Braves, who became the Milwaukee Braves after the team moved west before the 1953 season. His baseball career was interrupted by his military service in the United States Army during World War II.

With 363 career wins, Spahn holds the major league record for a left-handed pitcher, and has the most by a pitcher who played his entire career in the post-1920 live-ball era. He was a 17-time All-Star who won 20 games or more in 13 seasons, including a 23–7 win–loss record when he was age 42. Spahn won the 1957 Cy Young Award and was a three-time runner-up during the period when only one award was given for both leagues. He won 202 games in the 1950s, the most for all pitchers in the decade. At the time of his retirement in 1965, Spahn held the Major League record for career strikeouts by a left-handed pitcher.

Spahn was elected to the Baseball Hall of Fame in his first year of eligibility in 1973, with 82.89% of the vote. The Warren Spahn Award, given annually to the major leagues' best left-handed pitcher, is named in his honor. Regarded as a "thinking man's" pitcher who liked to outwit batters, Spahn once described his approach on the mound: "Hitting is timing. Pitching is upsetting timing."

== Early life ==
Spahn was born and raised in Buffalo, New York, to Edward and Mabel Spahn, the fifth of six children and the first of two sons. He was named after President Warren G. Harding and his father.

He attended Buffalo Bisons baseball games with his father and initially wanted to be a first baseman. However, when Spahn began to attend South Park High School, the first baseman position was already taken. Reluctantly, he took up pitching and led his high school team to two city championships, going undefeated his last two seasons, and throwing a no-hitter his senior year.

== Baseball career ==
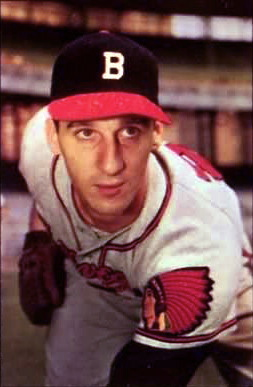
Spahn in 1953 card for the Braves in Boston

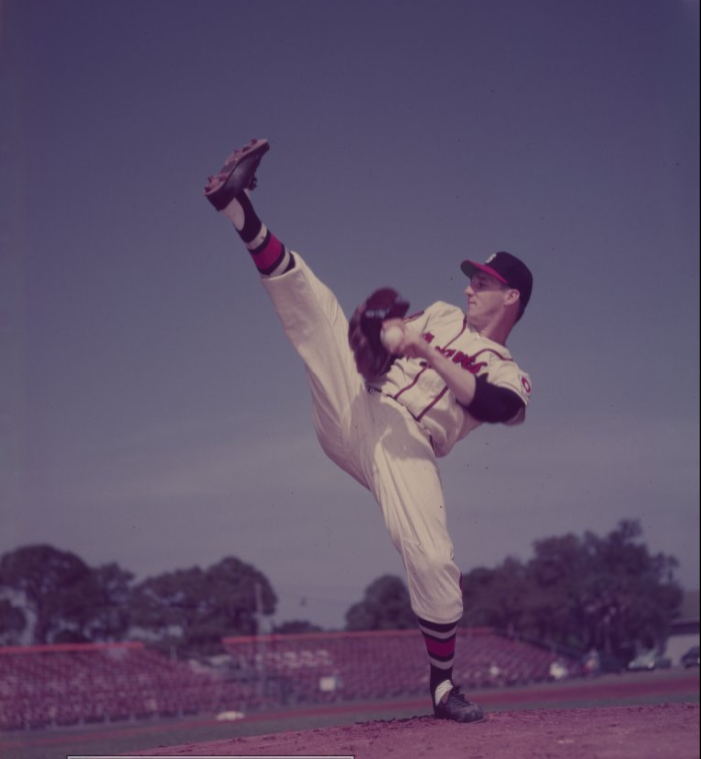
Spahn's famous high legkick windup

Spahn's major league career began in 1942 with the Braves organization, and he spent all but one year with that franchise, first in Boston and then in Milwaukee. He finished his career in 1965 with the New York Mets and the San Francisco Giants. With 363 wins, Spahn is the sixth-most winning pitcher in history, trailing only Cy Young (511), Walter Johnson (417), Grover Cleveland Alexander (373), Christy Mathewson (373), and Pud Galvin (364) on MLB's all-time list. He led the league in wins eight times (1949–50, 1953, 1957–1961, each season with 20+ wins) and won at least 20 games an additional five times (1947, 1951, 1954, 1956, 1963).

Spahn also threw two no-hitters, in 1960 and 1961, at ages 39 and 40. He won three ERA titles (1947, 1953, and 1961), and four strikeout crowns (1949–1952). Spahn also appeared in 14 All-Star Games, the most of any pitcher in the 20th century. He won the NL Player of the Month Award in August 1960 (6–0, 2.30 ERA, 32 strike-outs) and August 1961 (6–0, 1.00 ERA, 26 SOs).

Spahn acquired the nickname "Hooks", not so much because of his pitching, but due to the prominent shape of his nose. He had once been hit in the face by a thrown ball that he was not expecting, and his broken nose settled into a hook-like shape. In Spahn's final season, during his stint with the Mets, Yogi Berra came out of retirement briefly and caught four games, one of them with Spahn pitching. Yogi later told reporters, "I don't think we're the oldest battery, but we're certainly the ugliest."

Spahn was known for a very high leg kick in his delivery. Photo sequences show that this high kick served a specific purpose. As a left-hander, Spahn was able not only to watch any runner on first base, but also to avoid telegraphing whether he was delivering to the plate or to first base, thereby forcing the runner to stay close to the bag. As his fastball waned, Spahn adapted, and relied more on location, changing speeds and throwing a good screwball. He led or shared the lead in the National League (NL) in wins in 1957–1961 (ages 36–40).

Spahn was also a good hitter, with at least one home run in 17 straight seasons, and finishing with an NL career record for pitchers who do not play any other position, with 35 home runs. Wes Ferrell, who spent most of his time in the American League, holds the overall record for pitchers, with 37. Spahn posted a .194 batting average (363-for-1872) with 141 runs, 57 doubles, six triples, 94 walks, and 189 runs batted in (RBIs). He also drove in 10 or more runs nine times, with a career-high 18 in 1951. In 1958, he batted a strong .333 (36-for-108). In eight World Series games, he batted .200 (4-for-20) with four RBIs and a walk.

On August 1, 1965, Spahn, while playing for the San Francisco Giants, entered a game in the 7th inning against the Milwaukee Braves at County Stadium and to this day, is one of the few pitchers from an opposing team to receive a standing ovation from the crowd. He was pitching in relief of Masanori Murakami, the first Japanese-born player in the Major Leagues.

=== Minor Leagues and brief call-up ===
First signed by the Boston Braves, he reported to the Class-D Bradford Bees of the PONY League — later known as the NY-Penn League — after graduating high school. Spahn made his professional debut on July 6 at MacArthur Park (Dwyer Stadium) in Batavia, New York. He took the loss against the Batavia Clippers, pitching out of the bullpen, where he walked two batters and struck out none. He finished the season with a 5–4 record and 2.73 ERA. In 1941, Spahn broke out and won 19 games against six losses with a 1.83 ERA while pitching for the Class-B Evansville Bees of the Illinois-Indiana-Iowa League.

Spahn reached the major leagues in 1942 at the age of 20. He clashed with Braves manager Casey Stengel, who sent him back to the minors after Spahn refused to throw at Brooklyn Dodgers batter Pee Wee Reese in an exhibition game. Spahn had pitched in only four games, allowing 15 runs (10 earned) in 15.2 innings.

Stengel later said that it was the worst managing mistake he had ever made: "I said "no guts" to a kid who went on to become a war hero and one of the greatest lefthanded pitchers you ever saw. You can't say I don't miss 'em when I miss 'em". The 1942 Braves finished next to last, and Stengel was fired the following year. Spahn was reunited with his first manager 23 years later, for the even more woeful last-place New York Mets, and—referring to Stengel's success with the 1949–60 New York Yankees—later quipped, "I'm probably the only guy who played for Casey before and after he was a genius."

Spahn finished the 1942 season with a 17–12 record for the Hartford Bees of the Class-A Eastern League.

== World War II ==
Along with many other major leaguers, Spahn chose to enlist in the United States Army, after finishing the 1942 season in the minors. He served with distinction and was awarded a Purple Heart. He saw action in the Battle of the Bulge and at the Ludendorff Bridge as a combat engineer, and was awarded a battlefield commission.

Spahn returned to the major leagues in 1946 at the age of 25, having missed three full seasons. Had he played, Spahn might have finished his career behind only Walter Johnson and Cy Young in all-time wins. Spahn was unsure of the war's impact on his career:

People say that my absence from the big leagues may have cost me a chance to win 400 games, but I don't know about that. I matured a lot in three years, and I think I was better equipped to handle major league hitters at 25 than I was at 22. Also, I pitched until I was 44. Maybe I wouldn't have been able to do that otherwise.

== Boston / Milwaukee Braves ==
Spahn's first full season as a starting pitcher came in 1947, when he led the National League in ERA (2.33), shutouts (7), and innings pitched (289 2/3) while posting a 21–10 record. It was the first of his thirteen 20-win seasons. Spahn also won two more ERA titles, in 1953 and 1961.

On June 11, 1950, Spahn and pitcher Bob Rush of the Cubs each stole a base against each other; no opposing pitchers again stole a base in the same game until May 3, 2004, when Jason Marquis and Greg Maddux repeated the feat.

In 1951, Spahn allowed the first career hit to Willie Mays, a home run. Mays had begun his career 0-for-12, and Spahn responded to reporters after the game, citing the distance between home plate and the pitcher's mound of 60 feet 6 inches (18.44 m), "Gentlemen, for the first 60 feet, that was a hell of a pitch." Spahn joked a long time later, "I'll never forgive myself. We might have gotten rid of Willie forever if I'd only struck him out." (In 1962, another Hall of Famer hit his first career home run off Spahn: Sandy Koufax, who only hit one other.)

=== "Pray for rain" ===
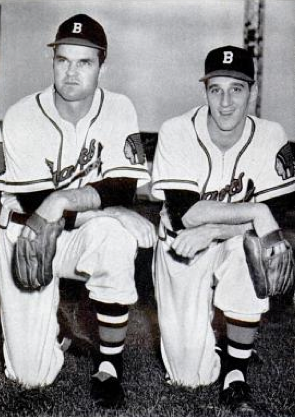
Spahn (right) with Johnny Sain

Spahn's teammate Johnny Sain was the ace of the pennant-winning 1948 Braves staff, with a win–loss record of 24–15. Spahn went 15–12, while contrary to legend, teammates Bill Voiselle (13–13), and Vern Bickford (11–5) also pitched well.

In honor of the pitching duo, Boston Post sports editor Gerald V. Hern wrote this poem which the popular media eventually condensed to "Spahn and Sain and Pray for Rain":

First we'll use Spahn
then we'll use Sain
Then an off day
followed by rain
Back will come Spahn
followed by Sain
And followed
we hope
by two days of rain.

The poem was inspired by the performance of Spahn and Sain during the Braves' 1948 pennant drive. The team swept a Labor Day doubleheader, with Spahn throwing a complete 14-inning win in the opener, and Sain pitching a shutout in the second game. Following two off days, it did rain. Spahn won the next day, and Sain won the day after that. Three days later, Spahn won again. Sain won the next day. After one more off day, the two pitchers were brought back, and won another doubleheader. The two pitchers had gone 8–0 in 12 days' time.

Other sayings have been derived from "Spahn and Sain and pray for rain." For example, some referred to the 1993 San Francisco Giants' imbalanced rotation as "Burkett and Swift and pray for snow drift."

In 1957, Spahn was the ace of the champion Milwaukee Braves. He pitched on two other Braves pennant winners, in 1948 and 1958. Spahn led the NL in strikeouts for four consecutive seasons, from 1949 to 1952 (tied with Don Newcombe in 1951), which includes a single-game high of 18 strikeouts in a 15-inning appearance on June 14, 1952.

During the 1957 World Series, Sal Maglie of the Yankees, ineligible to pitch in the series because he was acquired too late in the season, watched the games with Robert Creamer of Sports Illustrated and made assessments of the players. When Spahn was pitching, Maglie observed that batters had to try to hit balls to the opposite field against Spahn, as he was more likely to get them out if they tried to pull the ball.

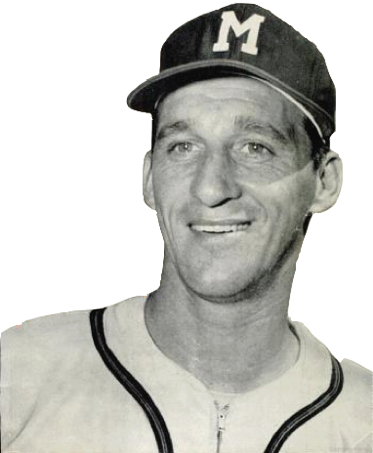
Spahn in 1958.

On July 2, 1963, facing the San Francisco Giants, the 42-year-old Spahn became locked into a storied pitchers' duel with 25-year-old Juan Marichal. The score was still 0–0 after more than four hours when Willie Mays hit a game-winning solo home run off Spahn with one out in the bottom of the 16th inning.

Marichal's manager, Alvin Dark, visited the mound in the 9th, 10th, 11th, 13th, and 14th innings, and was talked out of removing Marichal each time. During the 14th-inning visit, Marichal told Dark, "Do you see that man pitching for the other side? Do you know that man is 42 years old? I'm only 25. If that man is on the mound, nobody is going to take me out of here." Marichal ended up throwing 227 pitches in the complete game 1–0 win, while Spahn threw 201 in the loss, allowing nine hits and one walk.

Spahn threw his first no-hitter against the Philadelphia Phillies on September 16, 1960, when he was 39. He pitched his second no-hitter the following year on April 28, 1961, against the Giants. During the last two seasons of his career, Spahn was the oldest active player in baseball. He lost this distinction for a single day: September 25, 1965, when 58-year-old Satchel Paige pitched three innings.

Spahn's seemingly ageless ability caused Stan Musial to quip, "I don't think Spahn will ever get into the Hall of Fame. He'll never stop pitching."

=== Final season ===
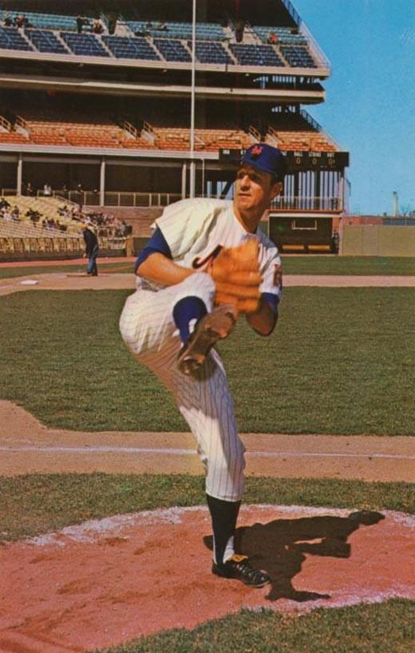
1965 B&E Color Advertising photo of Spahn for the New York Mets

Following the 1964 season, after 25 years with the franchise, Spahn was sold by the Braves to the New York Mets. Braves manager Bobby Bragan predicted, "Spahnie won't win six games with the Mets." Spahn took on the dual role of pitcher and pitching coach. Spahn won four and lost 12, at which point the Mets put Spahn on waivers on July 15, 1965, and released on July 22, 1965. He signed with the San Francisco Giants, with whom he appeared in his final major league game on October 1, 1965, at the age of 44. With the Mets and Giants combined, he won seven games for the season—his last in the major leagues.

=== Career statistics ===
In a 22-season major league career, Spahn posted a 363–245 win–loss record with 2,583 strikeouts and a 3.09 ERA in 5,243 2/3 innings pitched, including 63 shutouts and 382 complete games. His 2,583 career strikeouts were the most by a left-handed pitcher in MLB history until he was later on surpassed by Mickey Lolich in 1975.

His 363 career win total ranks sixth overall in major league history; it is also the most by a pitcher who played his entire career in the post-1920 live-ball era. Spahn still holds the major league record for most career wins by a left-handed pitcher. His 63 career shutouts is the highest total in the live-ball era and sixth highest overall.

Category	W	L	ERA	G	GS	CG	SHO	SV	IP	R	ER	HR	BB	SO	HBP	WHIP	FIP	ERA+
Total	363	245	3.09	750	665	382	63	28	5,243.2	2,016	1,798	434	1,434	2,583,	42	1.195	3.49	119

== Later life ==
Spahn managed the Tulsa Oilers for five seasons, winning 372 games from 1967 to 1971. His 1968 club won the Pacific Coast League championship. He also coached for the Mexico City Tigers and pitched a handful of games there. He was a pitching coach with the Cleveland Indians, in the minor leagues for the California Angels and for six years, with Japan's Hiroshima Toyo Carp.

For many years, he owned and ran the large Diamond Star Ranch south of Hartshorne, Oklahoma before retiring to live near a golf course in Broken Arrow with his half-Cherokee wife LoRene (née Southard) with whom he had one child, a son named Gregory (1948–2022).

=== Death ===
Spahn died of natural causes at his home in Broken Arrow. He is interred in the Elmwood Cemetery in Hartshorne. After his death, a street was named after him in Buffalo, New York, Warren Spahn Way, that connects Abbott Road with Seneca Street through Cazenovia Park in the heart of South Buffalo. The street is near South Park High School, Spahn's alma mater.

== Honors ==
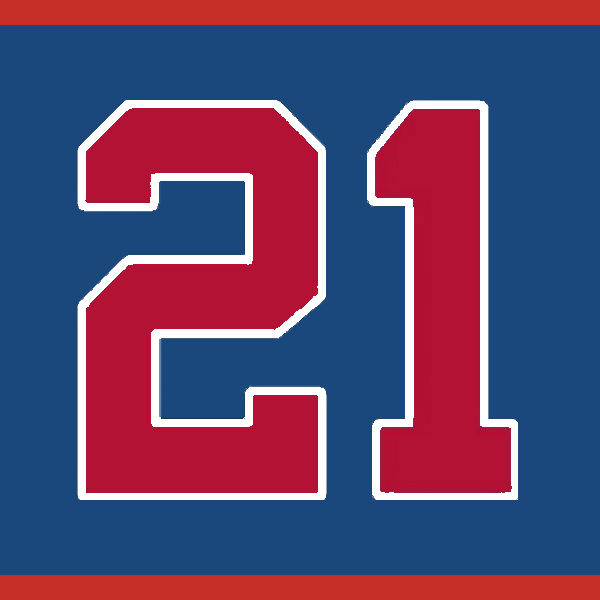
Warren Spahn's number 21 was retired by the Milwaukee Braves in 1965.

Spahn's number 21 was retired by the Braves in 1965, soon after his retirement. He was selected for the all-time All-Star baseball team by Sports Illustrated magazine in 1991, as the left-handed pitcher. The other selections were: outfielders Ty Cobb, Babe Ruth, and Willie Mays; shortstop Cal Ripken, third baseman Mike Schmidt, second baseman Jackie Robinson, first baseman Lou Gehrig, catcher Mickey Cochrane, right-handed pitcher Christy Mathewson, relief pitcher Dennis Eckersley, and manager Casey Stengel.

Spahn was elected to the Wisconsin Athletic Hall of Fame in 1973 and became a charter member of both the Buffalo Baseball Hall of Fame in 1985, and the Greater Buffalo Sports Hall of Fame in 1991.

In 1999, he was ranked number 21 by The Sporting News on their list of "Baseball's 100 Greatest Players", and was also named one of the 30 players on the Major League Baseball All-Century Team. In 2020, The Athletic ranked Spahn at number 49 on its "Baseball 100" list, complied by sportswriter Joe Posnanski.

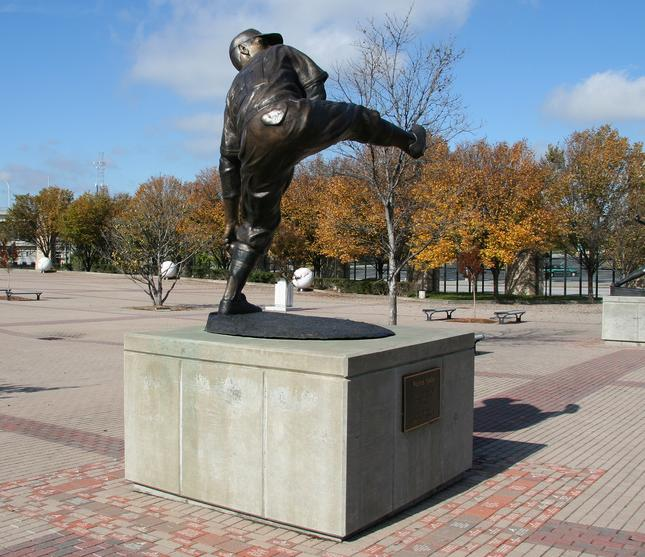
A statue of Spahn was situated outside Turner Field, and is now outside Truist Park

Spahn was inducted into the Braves Hall of Fame in 1999. A few months before his death, he attended the unveiling of a statue outside Atlanta's Turner Field. When the Braves vacated Turner Field to move into their current home of Truist Park, the statue was moved, and now stands outside that ballpark. The statue depicts Spahn in the middle of one of his leg kicks. The statue was created by Shan Gray, who has sculpted numerous other statues of athletes that stand in Oklahoma, including two others of Spahn. One statue resides at the Oklahoma Sports Hall of Fame located at the Chickasaw Bricktown Ballpark and the other is located in Hartshorne, Oklahoma, at the Hartshorne Event Center.

On April 4, 2009, the facilities of Broken Arrow Youth Baseball, in Spahn's longtime home of Broken Arrow, Oklahoma, were dedicated in his honor.

In their Naked Gun films, producers Zucker, Abrahams and Zucker sometimes included joke credits. The trio, who were Milwaukee-area natives, included Spahn in the closing credits once, with the disclaimer, "He's not in the film, but he's still our all-time favorite left-hand pitcher."

Spahn also made his acting debut with a cameo appearance as a German soldier in a 1963 episode (season two, episode eight "Glow Against the Sky") of the television series Combat!

In 2013, the Bob Feller Act of Valor Award honored Spahn as one of 37 Baseball Hall of Fame members for his service in the United States Army during World War II.

== See also ==
- Major League Baseball titles leaders
- List of Major League Baseball annual ERA leaders
- List of Major League Baseball annual shutout leaders
- List of Major League Baseball annual strikeout leaders
- List of Major League Baseball annual wins leaders
- List of Major League Baseball career complete games leaders
- List of Major League Baseball career innings pitched leaders
- List of Major League Baseball career shutout leaders
- List of Major League Baseball career strikeout leaders
- List of Major League Baseball career wins leaders
- List of Major League Baseball no-hitters
- List of Major League Baseball all-time leaders in home runs by pitchers

Awards and achievements
Preceded by Don Drysdale; Frank Robinson	Major League Player of the Month; August 1960; August 1961	Succeeded by Ken Boyer; Jim O'Toole
Preceded by Lew Burdette; Warren Spahn	No-hitter pitcher September 16, 1960; April 28, 1961	Succeeded by Warren Spahn; Bo Belinsky
Sporting positions
Preceded by Mel Harder	New York Mets Pitching Coach; 1965	Succeeded by Wes Westrum
Preceded by Cot Deal	Cleveland Indians Pitching Coach; 1972–1973	Succeeded by Clay Bryant
