= Pray for Rain (poem) =

Poem by Gerald V. Hern

- by Gerald V. Hern
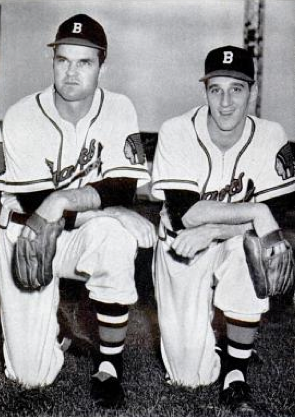
- Johnny Sain and Warren Spahn, c. 1951
- Language: English
- Subjects: Warren Spahn; Johnny Sain
- Publisher: The Boston Post
- Publication date: September 14, 1948

"Spahn and Sain", commonly referred to as "Pray for Rain", is a poem by Gerald V. Hern, published in The Boston Post on September 14, 1948. The poem was an ode to Boston Braves pitchers Warren Spahn and Johnny Sain who were both considered to be the team's best pitchers and who won a combined 212 games as teammates.

== Background ==
In 1948, the Boston Braves won what turned out to be their final pennant during their tenure at Boston, behind the pitching of future Hall of Famer Warren Spahn and his teammate Johnny Sain. The remainder of the rotation was seemingly so thin that in September, Boston Post writer Gerald Hern wrote a poem about the pair:

First we'll use Spahn
then we'll use Sain
Then an off day
followed by rain
Back will come Spahn
followed by Sain
And followed
we hope
by two days of rain.

The poem received such a wide audience that the sentiment, usually now paraphrased as "Spahn and Sain and pray for rain" or "Spahn and Sain, then pray for rain", is now considered a part of baseball lore.
