= Johnny Sain =

American baseball player (1917–2006)

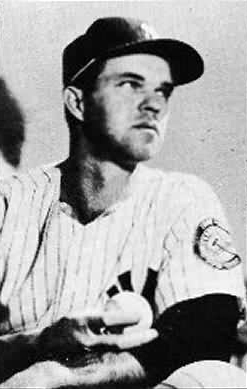
- Sain in 1953
- Pitcher
- Born: September 25, 1917; Havana, Arkansas, U.S.
- Died: November 7, 2006 (aged 89); Downers Grove, Illinois, U.S.
- Batted: Right Threw: Right

MLB debut
- April 17, 1942, for the Boston Braves

Last MLB appearance
- July 15, 1955, for the Kansas City Athletics

MLB statistics
- Win–loss record: 139–116
- Earned run average: 3.49
- Strikeouts: 910
- Stats at Baseball Reference

Teams
- As player: Boston Braves (1942, 1946–1951); New York Yankees (1951–1955); Kansas City Athletics (1955); As coach: Kansas City Athletics (1959); New York Yankees (1961–1963); Minnesota Twins (1965–1966); Detroit Tigers (1967–1969); Chicago White Sox (1971–1975); Atlanta Braves (1977, 1985–1986)

Career highlights and awards
- 3× All-Star (1947, 1948, 1953); 6× World Series champion (1951–1953, 1961, 1962, 1968); NL wins leader (1948); Braves Hall of Fame

John Franklin Sain (September 25, 1917 – November 7, 2006) was an American right-handed pitcher in Major League Baseball who was best known for teaming with left-hander Warren Spahn on the Boston Braves teams from 1946 to 1951. He was the runner-up for the National League's Most Valuable Player Award in the Braves' pennant-winning season of 1948, after leading the National League in wins, complete games and innings pitched. He later became further well known as one of the top pitching coaches in the majors.

== Military service ==
Beginning in late 1942, Sain served in the United States Navy during World War II. As a navy pilot, he spent the next three years stateside, while also playing baseball on the navy bases. He was discharged in November 1945.

== Pitching star of post-war Boston Braves ==
Born in Havana, Arkansas, Sain pitched for 11 years, winning 139 games and losing 116 in his career and compiled an earned run average of 3.49. His best years were those immediately after World War II, when he won 100 games for the Boston Braves, before being traded to the New York Yankees during the 1951 season for Lew Burdette and cash.

Sain had the distinction of being the first pitcher in the Major Leagues to face Jackie Robinson. In 1943, while participating in a benefit game for the Red Cross, Sain became the last man to pitch against Babe Ruth in organized baseball.

In 1948, Sain won 24 games against 15 losses and finished second in the voting for the Most Valuable Player Award behind the St. Louis Cardinals' Stan Musial, who had won two legs of the Triple Crown. Sain and teammate Spahn achieved joint immortality that year when their feats were the subject of sports editor Gerald V. Hern's poem in the Boston Post which was eventually shortened to the epigram "Spahn and Sain and Pray for Rain" According to the Baseball Almanac, the original doggerel appeared in Hern's column on September 14, 1948:

First we'll use Spahn
then we'll use Sain
Then an off day
followed by rain
Back will come Spahn
followed by Sain
And followed
we hope
by two days of rain.

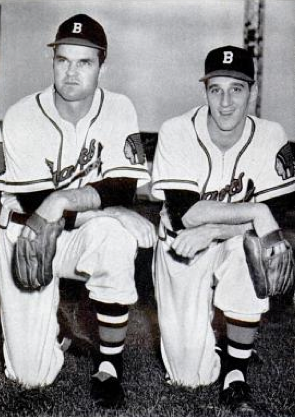
Sain (left) with Warren Spahn in 1951.

The poem was inspired by the performance of Sain and Spahn during the Braves' 1948 pennant drive. The team swept a Labor Day doubleheader, with Spahn throwing a complete game 14-inning win in the opener, and Sain pitching a shutout in the second game. Following two off days, it did rain. Spahn won the next day, and Sain won the day after that. Three days later, Spahn won again. Sain won the next day. After one more off day, the two pitchers were brought back, and won another doubleheader. The two pitchers had gone 8–0 in twelve days' time.

That year, the Boston Braves won their second, latter National League pennant of the post-1901 era, but fell in six games to the Cleveland Indians in the 1948 World Series. Sain won the first game of the Series, a 1–0 shutout at Braves Field that included a memorable play in which Boston catcher Phil Masi was called safe after an apparent pickoff at second base. Masi went on to score the game's only run.

With the Yankees, Sain became a relief pitcher and enjoyed late-career success, leading the American League in saves with 22 in 1954. He finished his career in 1955 with the Kansas City Athletics.

When Sain was pitching, he thought that merely throwing the ball was not enough to get the ball to vary its course as it travelled to home plate. In order to throw a pitch such as a curveball or a screwball, he had to snap his wrist.

Over the course of his 11-season Major League career, Sain recorded a .245 batting average as a pitcher, with 69 runs scored, three home runs, and 101 runs batted in.

== Pitching coach ==
After retiring as a player, Sain spent many years as a well-regarded and outspoken pitching coach for the Kansas City Athletics, New York Yankees, Minnesota Twins, Detroit Tigers, Chicago White Sox and Atlanta Braves. During the 1960s, Sain coached the pitchers of five of the American League's ten pennant-winning teams.

While serving as the Yankees pitching coach, Sain picked up an apple one day and poked a broken car antenna through it. Spinning the apple, Sain came to the idea that he could do the same with a baseball by inserting a wooden rod into it, enabling him to spin the ball differently, imitating the spins used for different pitches. Sain eventually patented the idea and sold his product from his home in Arkansas.

An independent thinker among coaches, Sain tended to be admired by his pitchers, although he battled with at least two of his managers—Sam Mele of the Twins and Mayo Smith of the Tigers—when he disagreed with them. In each case, Sain was fired, but the manager's dismissal soon followed when his pitching staff suffered from Sain's absence. Sain did not make friends among owners and general managers, either, when he would advise pitchers to "climb those golden stairs" to their teams' front offices to demand more money in salary talks. Sain was also well known for ignoring running drills most pitchers despised. He frequently told pitchers and managers "You don't run the damn ball across the plate. If running did it, they'd look for pitchers on track teams."

Jim Bouton, in his book Ball Four, expressed unreserved admiration for Sain, who had been his pitching tutor in New York during his first two Major League seasons, 1962 and 1963. Bouton openly wished to pitch for the 1969 Tigers in order to have yet another opportunity to benefit from Sain's coaching. Sain and Bouton were briefly reunited in the Atlanta Braves system in 1978. Ned Garver said Sain was the best pitching coach he ever encountered. "If he had an idea that he thought could be of value to you, he would tell you about it to try to help you, but by the time he finished visiting with you about it, you would think that you'd thought of it yourself," Garver described Sain's approach.

Tommy John, on the other hand, had trouble working with Sain, who kept trying to get the pitcher to throw a slider, a pitch which always gave John trouble. "Sain could show you how to throw any pitch in the book, but he couldn't look at your motion and tell if your mechanics were off," recalled John. "For a sinkerballer [which John was], that spells trouble."

Pitchers who won 20 or more games under Sain's coaching include Jim Kaat, Whitey Ford, Mudcat Grant, Denny McLain, Jim Bouton, Al Downing, Jim Perry, Wilbur Wood, and Stan Bahnsen.

== Personal life ==
Sain was married twice. His first wife was Doris May McBride of Dallas. They were married on October 1, 1945 and had four children: John Jr., Sharyl, Ronda and Randy. The couple divorced in 1970. Sain's second wife was Mary Ann Zaremba, whom he married on August 24, 1972. They had no children together. Sain was disabled by a stroke in 2002. He died at age 89 in Downers Grove, Illinois, on November 7, 2006. At the time of his death, Sain had 11 grandchildren.

== See also ==
- List of Major League Baseball annual saves leaders
- List of Major League Baseball annual wins leaders
- Pitcher of the Year Award

Sporting positions
Preceded by Spud Chandler	Kansas City Athletics Pitching Coach; 1959	Succeeded by Freddie Fitzsimmons
Preceded by Eddie Lopat	New York Yankees Pitching Coach; 1961–1963	Succeeded by Whitey Ford
Preceded by Gordon Maltzberger	Minnesota Twins Pitching Coach; 1965–1966	Succeeded by Early Wynn
Preceded by Stubby Overmire	Detroit Tigers Pitching Coach; 1967–1969	Succeeded by Mike Roarke
Preceded by Hugh Mulcahy	Chicago White Sox Pitching Coach; 1971–1975	Succeeded by Ken Silvestri
Preceded by Herm Starrette; Rube Walker	Atlanta Braves Pitching Coach; 1977; 1985–1986	Succeeded by Cloyd Boyer; Bruce Dal Canton
