= 1947 in baseball =

The following are the baseball events of the year 1947 throughout the world.

== Champions ==
=== Major League Baseball ===
- Negro League World Series: New York Cubans over Cleveland Buckeyes (4–1)
- World Series: New York Yankees over Brooklyn Dodgers (4–3)
- All-Star Game, July 8 at Wrigley Field: American League, 2–1
- Negro League Baseball All-Star Game: West, 5–2

=== Other champions ===
- All-American Girls Professional Baseball League: Grand Rapids Chicks over Muskegon Lassies
- First College World Series: California
- First Little League World Series: Maynard, Williamsport, Pennsylvania

==== Winter Leagues ====
- Cuban League: Alacranes de Almendares
- Mexican Pacific League: Presidentes de Hermosillo
- Puerto Rican League: Leones de Ponce
- Venezuelan League: Sabios de Vargas

==== Club tournaments ====
- Interamerican Series: Buffalo All-Stars

== Awards and honors ==
- Baseball Hall of Fame
  - Carl Hubbell
  - Frankie Frisch
  - Mickey Cochrane
  - Lefty Grove
- Most Valuable Player
  - Joe DiMaggio (AL)
  - Bob Elliott (NL)
- Rookie of the Year
  - Jackie Robinson (ML)
- The Sporting News Player of the Year Award
  - Ted Williams (AL) – OF, Boston Red Sox
- The Sporting News Manager of the Year Award
  - Bucky Harris (AL) – New York Yankees

== Statistical leaders ==
Any team shown in small text indicates a previous team a player was on during the season.

	American League		National League		Negro American League		Negro National League	
Stat	Player	Total	Player	Total	Player	Total	Player	Total
AVG	Ted Williams^{1} (BOS)	.343	Harry Walker (PHI/STL)	.363	Willard Brown (KCM)	.377	Henry Kimbro (BEG)	.385
HR	Ted Williams^{1} (BOS)	32	Ralph Kiner (PIT); Johnny Mize (NYG)	51	Hank Thompson (KCM)	8	Monte Irvin (NE)	11
RBI	Ted Williams^{1} (BOS)	114	Johnny Mize (NYG)	138	Willard Brown (KCM)	64	Butch Davis (BEG); Henry Kimbro (BEG)	52
W	Bob Feller (CLE)	20	Ewell Blackwell (CIN)	22	Jim LaMarque (KCM)	10	Max Manning (NE)	12
ERA	Joe Haynes (CWS)	2.42	Warren Spahn (BSN)	2.33	Gene Richardson (KCM)	1.33	Lino Donoso (NYC)	2.30
K	Bob Feller (CLE)	196	Ewell Blackwell (CIN)	193	Jim LaMarque (KCM)	85	Bob Romby (BEG)	99

^{1} American League Triple Crown batting winner

== Major league baseball final standings ==
=== American League final standings ===
American League
Team	W	L	Pct.	GB	Home	Road
New York Yankees	97	57	.630	—	55‍–‍22	42‍–‍35
Detroit Tigers	85	69	.552	12	46‍–‍31	39‍–‍38
Boston Red Sox	83	71	.539	14	49‍–‍30	34‍–‍41
Cleveland Indians	80	74	.519	17	38‍–‍39	42‍–‍35
Philadelphia Athletics	78	76	.506	19	39‍–‍38	39‍–‍38
Chicago White Sox	70	84	.455	27	32‍–‍43	38‍–‍41
Washington Senators	64	90	.416	33	36‍–‍41	28‍–‍49
St. Louis Browns	59	95	.383	38	29‍–‍48	30‍–‍47

Locations of teams for the 1942–1953 American League seasons
American League

=== National League final standings ===
National League
Team	W	L	Pct.	GB	Home	Road
Brooklyn Dodgers	94	60	.610	—	52‍–‍25	42‍–‍35
St. Louis Cardinals	89	65	.578	5	46‍–‍31	43‍–‍34
Boston Braves	86	68	.558	8	50‍–‍27	36‍–‍41
New York Giants	81	73	.526	13	45‍–‍31	36‍–‍42
Cincinnati Reds	73	81	.474	21	42‍–‍35	31‍–‍46
Chicago Cubs	69	85	.448	25	36‍–‍43	33‍–‍42
Philadelphia Phillies	62	92	.403	32	38‍–‍38	24‍–‍54
Pittsburgh Pirates	62	92	.403	32	32‍–‍45	30‍–‍47

Locations of teams for the 1943–1952 National League seasons
National League

== Negro league baseball final standings ==
All Negro leagues standings below are per MLB and Seamheads.

=== Negro American League final standings ===
vs. Negro American League						vs. Major Black teams			
Negro American League	W	L	T	Pct.	GB	W	L	T	Pct.
Cleveland Buckeyes	49	18	0	.750	—	62	35	1	.638
Kansas City Monarchs	47	29	0	.618	6½	66	47	1	.583
Birmingham Black Barons	42	37	0	.532	13	58	52	0	.527
Memphis Red Sox	38	48	2	.443	20½	49	65	3	.432
Cincinnati–Indianapolis Clowns	30	50	2	.378	25½	40	73	2	.357
Chicago American Giants	28	52	0	.350	27½	36	67	0	.350

Locations of teams for the 1947 Negro American League season
Negro American League
Note: Clowns play in both Indianapolis and Cincinnati.

=== Negro National League final standings ===
vs. Negro National League						vs. Major Black teams			
Negro National League	W	L	T	Pct.	GB	W	L	T	Pct.
New York Cubans	43	18	1	.702	—	52	26	1	.665
Newark Eagles	45	38	1	.542	9	51	45	1	.531
Baltimore Elite Giants	41	36	2	.532	10	52	44	3	.540
Homestead Grays	33	34	3	.493	13	61	44	4	.578
Philadelphia Stars	24	33	2	.424	17	36	37	2	.493
New York Black Yankees	11	38	3	.240	26	21	49	6	.316

Locations of teams for the 1944–1947 Negro National League seasons
Negro National League
Note: Homestead Grays played in both Washington, D.C. and Pittsburgh, with the majority in Washington, D.C.

=== Negro World Series ===
- 1947 Negro World Series: New York Cubans over Cleveland Buckeyes 4–1 (one tie).

== All-American Girls Professional Baseball League final standings ==
Rank	Team	W	L	Pct.	GB
1	Muskegon Lassies	69	43	.616	–
2	Grand Rapids Chicks	64	46	.582	4
3	Racine Belles	65	47	.580	4
4	South Bend Blue Sox	57	54	.514	11½
5	Peoria Redwings	54	57	.487	14½
6	Rockford Peaches	48	63	.432	19½
7	Fort Wayne Daisies	44	66	.400	24
8	Kenosha Comets	43	69	.384	26

== Events ==
=== January ===
- January 18 – The Pittsburgh Pirates purchase the contract of first baseman Hank Greenberg from the Detroit Tigers for $75,000. A future Baseball Hall of Famer and all-time Tiger great, Greenberg, now 36, led the American League in homers with 44 in 1946, but he has become estranged from Detroit's front office. The Pirates will pair him with sophomore Ralph Kiner, who led the National League with 23 home runs in 1946. They also will shorten the left-field dimensions in Forbes Field; the "porch" favoring the two right-handed sluggers will be initially nicknamed "Greenberg Gardens," then "Kiner's Korner." The 1947 campaign proves to be Greenberg's last as an active player; he will hit 25 long balls for the Pirates, while Kiner's and Johnny Mize's 51 home runs set the pace for the majors.
- January 20 – Less than three months before the start of the National League season, with Jackie Robinson poised to break the baseball color line, catcher Josh Gibson of the Homestead Grays, known as "the black Babe Ruth", dies from a stroke in Pittsburgh at 35. Despite a prolonged period of declining mental and physical health, possibly due to a brain tumor, Gibson passes away months after leading the Negro National League in homers in 1946—the 11th time he's done so in 13 seasons. Author of as many as 962 home runs overall, and believed to have compiled a career batting average of as high as .373, he'll be elected to the Baseball Hall of Fame in 1972. (See Deaths for this date below.)

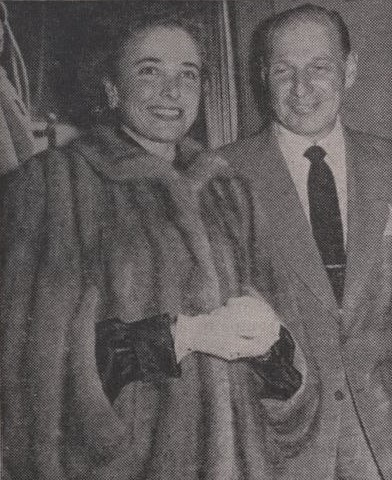
Laraine Day and husband Leo Durocher in 1949

- January 21:
  - A rule change implemented by the Baseball Writers' Association of America that allows voting only for players after 1921 produces four new members of the Hall of Fame: Mickey Cochrane, Frank Frisch, Lefty Grove and Carl Hubbell. Pie Traynor misses selection by only two votes.
  - Brooklyn Dodgers manager Leo Durocher and actress Laraine Day wed in El Paso, Texas, publicly defying a California judge's decree that they wait a full year from Day's divorce before marrying. Durocher and Day have been the subject of intense press scrutiny since their extra-marital affair made headlines in early December 1946.
- January 25 – The New York Yankees sign free-agent first baseman George McQuinn, who was released by the Philadelphia Athletics 16 days earlier. A slick fielder and line-drive hitter, McQuinn, 36, is a four-time AL All-Star who had slumped badly with Philadelphia in 1946. As a Yankee in 1947 and 1948, he'll make two more All-Star squads and earn a World Series ring.

=== February ===
- February 1 – Commissioner of Baseball Happy Chandler announces the creation of a pension plan for retired major leaguers. Any player with five years of experience will receive $50 a month at age 50 and $10 a month for each of the next five years. The plan extends to coaches, players and trainers active on Opening Day. The plan will be funded by $650,000‚ with the 16 teams providing 80% and the players the remaining 20%.
- February 4 – The career of Hal Trosky comes to an end when he's released by the Chicago White Sox. Though overshadowed by fellow first basemen Lou Gehrig and Jimmie Foxx, Trosky, 33, was one of the American League's most feared batsmen of the 1930s, once (in 1936) driving in 162 runs on the strength of 42 homers as a member of the Cleveland Indians. But debilitating migraine headaches impaired his durability, then caused him to miss three full seasons before attempting a final comeback with the 1946 Pale Hose.
- February 14 – The Philadelphia Athletics deal right-handed pitchers Lum Harris and Lou Knerr to the Washington Senators for outfielder/first baseman George Binks.
- February 19 – The Boston Red Sox sign free-agent catcher Frankie "Blimp" Hayes, released by the White Sox six days earlier. Former "iron-man" Hayes, 32, is only 2+ years removed from his remarkable 1944 season, in which he started all 155 of the Athletics' games behind the plate, and only missed 18 innings of action all season. He then followed that in 1945 by starting a combined 151 games for the Athletics and Indians. Hayes will be released by the Red Sox on May 21, 1947, after making only five appearances—ending his MLB career.
- February 23–25 – The wildest pennant race in Cuban League annals sees the Alacranes del Almendares overcome a six-game, late-season deficit to defeat their archrivals, the Leones del Habana, in a three-game, season-concluding sweep. American left-hander Max Lanier, one of the players suspended indefinitely by MLB in May 1946 for "jumping" the reserve clause to sign with the "outlaw" Mexican League, wins two of the contests, including the clincher on a single day of rest.

=== March ===
- March 1:
  - New managers in spring training camps are Billy Herman with the Pittsburgh Pirates, Muddy Ruel with the St. Louis Browns, Bucky Harris with the New York Yankees, and Johnny Neun with the Cincinnati Reds. Neun had ended the 1946 season as manager of the Yankees after both Joe McCarthy and Bill Dickey had quit.
  - Brooklyn's Catholic Youth Organization withdraws from Ebbets Field's "Knothole Gang" to protest Leo Durocher's personal conduct in his affair with and marriage to Laraine Day. Reports critical of Durocher's off-field friendships with gamblers have also been in the headlines since the autumn of 1946.
- March 4 – The Washington Senators reacquire outfielder and six-time American League stolen base king George Case from the Cleveland Indians in exchange for knuckleball hurler Roger Wolff. Case had played 1,190 games for Washington from 1937–1945 before being swapped to the Indians in December 1945 for outfielder Jeff Heath.
- March 15:
  - The Brooklyn Dodgers and their Montreal Royals affiliate arrive in Panama for a series of exhibition games against each other. The teams have been training in Havana to avoid Jim Crow laws in the United States. The Montreal roster includes 1946 International League batting champion Jackie Robinson and catcher Roy Campanella. Brooklyn president and general manager Branch Rickey hopes that Robinson's talent and style of play will "break the ice" with the all-white Dodger roster and smooth his promotion to the major leagues. However, before the Panama series begins, a petition begins to circulate among the white players on the Dodgers that seeks to keep Robinson off the team.
  - The Chicago Cubs bring back one of their stalwart pitchers of the 1930s, veteran right-hander "Big Bill" Lee, as a free agent three weeks after his release from the Boston Braves. Lee, 37, won 20 and 22 games for the National League-champion 1935 and 1938 Cubs, and also posted 19- and 18-win seasons in a Chicago uniform. He'll get into 14 games for the Cubs and spend part of 1947 in the Texas League before drawing his career-ending release on September 19.
- March 22 – The Chicago White Sox claim veteran pitcher Hiram Bithorn on waivers from the Pittsburgh Pirates. The first Puerto Rican to play in Major League Baseball, Bithorn, 31, will pitch in only two innings for the White Sox (going 1–0, 0.00) before being idled by a sore arm.
- March 24 – Commissioner of Baseball Happy Chandler convenes a hearing in Sarasota, Florida, in response to the public feud between New York Yankees president and co-owner Larry MacPhail and Brooklyn Dodgers manager Leo Durocher. The dispute flared when a newspaper article that ran under Durocher's byline on March 9 accused baseball (and, indirectly, the Commissioner) of a "double standard" by allowing MacPhail to bestow free tickets to a Dodgers–Yankees exhibition game to two known gamblers whom Durocher has been warned by Chandler to avoid.
- March 26 – After manager Leo Durocher calls a middle-of-the-night meeting to castigate Brooklyn Dodgers players who've signed a petition aimed at denying Jackie Robinson a place on the team, one of the petitioners, outfielder Dixie Walker, asks Branch Rickey to trade him. Walker, a former NL batting champion and three-time All-Star, is one of the Dodgers' most popular veterans, nicknamed The People's Cherce.

=== April ===
- April 2 – The Boston Red Sox sell the contract of right-fielder Catfish Metkovich to the Cleveland Indians.
- April 6 – The New York Yankees sign pitcher Lew Burdette, 20, as an amateur free agent.
- April 9:
  - Commissioner of Baseball Happy Chandler drops a bombshell on the Brooklyn Dodgers, suspending manager Leo Durocher for the entire 1947 season for "conduct detrimental to baseball." Chandler's controversial ruling, which comes after his closed-door hearings of late March, stems from Durocher's highly publicized, high-risk behavior—his association with known gamblers, scandals surrounding his allegedly adulterous courting of and marriage to starlet Laraine Day, and public feud with powerful New York Yankees co-owner Larry MacPhail.
  - The suspension leaves the Dodgers without a manager on the eve of the National League season—and the anticipated debut of "Organized Baseball's" first Black major-league player of the 20th century, Jackie Robinson. A press release issued the following day at Ebbets Field in the sixth inning of an exhibition game will announce that the Dodgers have purchased Robinson's contract from the Montreal Royals.
- April 12:
  - The New York Yankees release longtime ace relief pitcher Johnny Murphy; the 38-year-old right-hander signs with the Boston Red Sox three days later.
  - The St. Louis Browns sell the contract of third baseman Mark Christman to the Washington Senators.
  - The Pittsburgh Pirates unconditionally release third baseman Lee Handley, who's immediately signed by the cross-state Philadelphia Phillies.

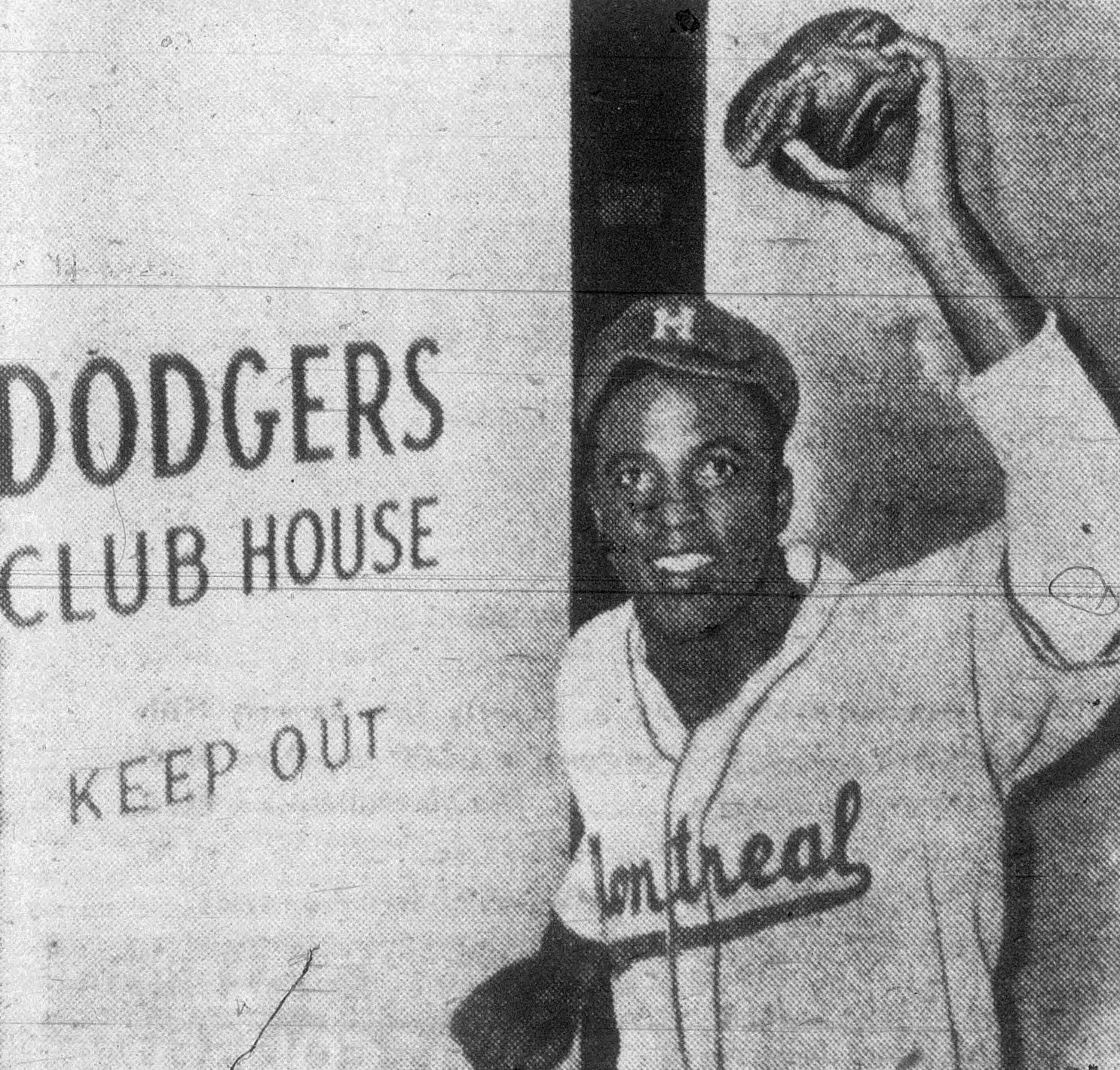
Jackie Robinson, April 1947

- April 15 – Major League Baseball's color line is officially broken forever when Jackie Robinson makes his debut for the Brooklyn Dodgers against the Boston Braves at Ebbets Field. Playing first base and batting second, Robinson goes hitless in three at bats, but scores the winning run in a 5–3 Brooklyn victory. He plays errorless ball in the field. Coach Clyde Sukeforth, who escorted Robinson to Brooklyn for his historic meeting with Branch Rickey in August 1945, is the Dodgers' acting manager who writes Robinson's name on today's lineup card. More than a half-century later, Major League Baseball will decree April 15 to be "Jackie Robinson Day" with every MLB player wearing Robinson's #42.
- April 16 – The Cincinnati Reds sell the contract of veteran utilityman and former NL All-Star second baseman Lonny Frey to the Chicago Cubs.
- April 18:
  - Burt Shotton, 62, a long-time associate of Branch Rickey's, is appointed to serve as manager of the Brooklyn Dodgers during Leo Durocher's season-long suspension. Rickey turns to Shotton after Joe McCarthy, currently retired, declines the chance to take the interim position. Apart from one game, Shotton has not helmed a big-league team since he was fired from the Philadelphia Phillies in 1933 after compiling a 370–549–4 (.403) record over six full baseball seasons. Having hung up his uniform when he stepped down as a Cleveland Indians coach in 1945, he will manage the Dodgers in street clothes.
    - In Shotton's first game today, Brooklyn falls to the New York Giants, 10–4, at the Polo Grounds for its first defeat of 1947. Jackie Robinson, however, collects his first National League home run, hit in the third inning off Dave Koslo.
  - The St. Louis Cardinals sell the contract of pitcher and 1942 World Series hero Johnny Beazley to the Boston Braves. Beazley, struggling to recover from a sore arm suffered while playing baseball during his United States Army service in World War II, will pitch in only 13 games for the Braves from this season through May 1949.
- April 22:
  - On a cold afternoon at Ebbets Field, in the opener of a three-game series, Ben Chapman, manager of the Philadelphia Phillies, leads his team in racist chants directed at Jackie Robinson of the Brooklyn Dodgers. The Phillies' abuse backfires: it begins to galvanize support for Robinson among white teammates formerly cool or hostile to his presence; influential radio and print journalists denounce Chapman; and Commissioner Happy Chandler chastises him. The contest itself is scoreless into the bottom of the eighth inning when Robinson singles, steals second base, and scores its only run on an RBI hit by Gene Hermanski. Brooklyn's Hal Gregg throws a one-hit, complete-game shutout, allowing only a first-inning double to Del Ennis. Brooklyn will sweep all three low-scoring games; Robinson scores four of their eight total runs.
  - Cleveland Indians fireballer Bob Feller one hits the visiting St. Louis Browns and triumphs 5–0. Al Zarilla's seventh-inning single spoils the no-hitter; Feller walks one and fans ten hitters.
- April 23 – Cleveland sells the contract of minor-league slugger Gus Zernial to the Chicago White Sox. Outfielder Zernial will require two more years of seasoning at Triple-A, but when he arrives in the majors in 1949, he'll blast 237 homers over an 11-season career.
- April 24 – Johnny Mize belts three home runs and Walker Cooper adds another, but the New York Giants fall to Johnny Sain and the Boston Braves, 14–5, at the "Wigwam". The Braves collect 21 hits, led by Danny Litwhiler's four safeties; Litwhiler also hits Boston's only homer of the day.
- April 27 – It is Babe Ruth Day at Yankee Stadium. Battling throat cancer, Ruth speaks to the packed house, proclaiming, "The only real game, I think, in the world is baseball."
- April 29 – After signing with the New York Yankees the previous winter, Joe Medwick is released despite never playing a single game with the Bombers. On May 25, the future Hall of Famer, now 35, will rejoin his original team, the St. Louis Cardinals, as a backup outfielder and pinch hitter.

=== May ===
- May 2 – Future Hall-of-Famer Bob Feller tosses his second one-hitter in ten days with his 2–0 victory over the Boston Red Sox at Cleveland Stadium. Johnny Pesky's first-inning single is Boston's only "knock"; Feller walks six and strikes out ten. Over his career, "Rapid Robert" will fire three no-hit games; April 22's and today's are the ninth and tenth of the 12 one-hitters he'll have on his résumé. Feller's third straight complete-game, shutout win lowers his earned run average to 0.26 for 1947.
- May 3:
  - The Brooklyn Dodgers trade pitchers Hank Behrman, Kirby Higbe and Cal McLish, catcher Dixie Howell, and infielder Gene Mauch to the Pittsburgh Pirates for outfielder Al Gionfriddo and $100,000. Higbe had been among those Dodgers seeking a trade rather than play alongside Jackie Robinson; Howell, on the other hand, had congratulated Robinson on his promotion to the Dodgers. Gionfriddo, a second-stringer in his final MLB season, will make one of the most celebrated "circus catches" in World Series history in October.
  - The St. Louis Cardinals send outfielder Harry Walker and pitcher Freddy Schmidt to the Philadelphia Phillies in exchange for outfielder Ron Northey. Although batting a paltry .200 with the Redbirds, Walker will hit .371 for the Phillies in 130 games to finish the season with a National League-leading .363 batting average.
- May 9:
  - A story authored by sports editor Stanley Woodward of the New York Herald Tribune reports that NL president Ford Frick and St. Louis Cardinals owner Sam Breadon have quelled a potential strike by members of the Cardinals who refuse to take the field with Jackie Robinson. While a potential strike has been rumored, the details of Woodward's story will be hotly disputed and the seriousness of such a strike threat debated for decades.
  - Right-hander Cliff Fannin of the St. Louis Browns issues 11 bases on balls and allows ten hits in 101/3 innings of work in today's start against the visiting Cleveland Indians. Yet he loses the contest by a score of only 4–3. Cleveland leaves 17 on base over the 11-inning game.
  - The Pittsburgh Pirates sell the contract of veteran left-hander Ken Heintzelman, 31, to the Philadelphia Phillies.
- May 13:
  - Ted Williams hits two home runs over Fenway Park's Green Monster for the first time in his career, as the Boston Red Sox drub the Chicago White Sox, 19–6. Earlier in the day, Williams had promised a boy in a local hospital that he'd hit a homer for him. Also today, Bobby Doerr hits for the cycle for the second time in his career, becoming the first member of the Bosox to achieve this feat. Doerr smacks a double and a single in a nine-run eighth inning to complete his cycle. Bill Zuber is the winning pitcher over Earl Harrist.
  - At Crosley Field, 27,164 fans watch the Cincinnati Reds beat the Brooklyn Dodgers, 7–5. It is estimated that nearly 9,000 of the fans are black‚ attracted to the game because of Jackie Robinson. When Robinson comes on the field, the Crosley Field organist plays the song Bye Bye Blackbird.
- May 16 – The Boston Braves sign eight-time NL All-Star first baseman Frank McCormick, 35, who had been released by the Philadelphia Phillies two days earlier.
- May 17 – During today's game at Forbes Field, veteran Pittsburgh Pirates first baseman Hank Greenberg asks baserunner Jackie Robinson if he's injured after an earlier collision between the two. Greenberg then gives rookie Robinson a pep talk, telling him: "Don't pay any attention to these guys who are trying to make it hard for you. Stick in there. You're doing fine. Keep your chin up." Robinson takes the advice to heart and later praises Greenberg to the New York Times and writes of him as his "diamond hero". Robinson knows that Greenberg, a Jew, had withstood his own trial by fire with racial taunts being hurled at him by fans and players.
- May 20 – The Boston Red Sox obtain starting catcher Birdie Tebbetts from the Detroit Tigers for fellow backstop Hal Wagner.
- May 26 – In the Bronx, Joe DiMaggio goes three for four, including his fourth home run, scores three times, and drives in four to lead the New York Yankees to a 9–3 victory and a four-game sweep of the defending American League champion Red Sox. Outscoring the Bosox 40–5 over the four contests, the Yankees vault ahead of them into second place, three games behind the league-leading Detroit Tigers. Moreover, their rough treatment of Tex Hughson and Dave Ferriss betrays the arm troubles and performance declines that will beset Boston's ace starting pitchers.
- May 30 – In a Memorial Day doubleheader at Shibe Park, the Philadelphia Athletics shock the Yankees by shutting them out twice, 1–0 and 4–0, behind hurlers Dick Fowler and Joe Coleman. In 1946, Connie Mack's Athletics had lost 105 of 154 games, but they will rebound this season to post their first over-.500 campaign since 1933.

=== June ===
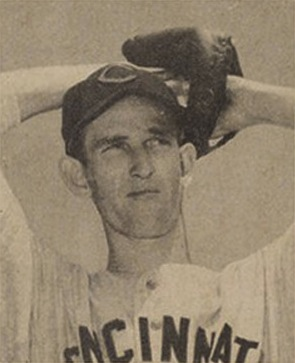
Ewell Blackwell

- June 8 – In the first game of a Sunday doubleheader, Comiskey Park hosts a marathon pitchers duel, as the Washington Senators and the Chicago White Sox grapple for 17 scoreless innings before the Senators break through with a run in the top of the 18th on Al Evans's triple and Sherry Robertson's sacrifice fly, then hold on for a 1–0 victory. Starters Walt Masterson (16 shutout frames) and Frank Papish (13 innings) depart before the game is decided. The official time of the game, the longest in the majors in 1947, is 3:30. Masterson begins MLB's longest consecutive-scoreless-innings-pitched streak of 1947 (34) before it ends on June 27 against the Pale Hose at Griffith Stadium.
- June 9:
  - At Braves Field, veteran right-hander Red Barrett hurls his third one-hitter in as many seasons in a 1–0 Boston victory over the Chicago Cubs. Barrett's opposite number, Hank Borowy, spoils the no-hit bid with a sixth-inning single.
  - At the Polo Grounds, the Pittsburgh Pirates blow an 8–1 lead in the bottom of the eighth inning when the New York Giants tally eight times to claim a 9–8 edge. The Bucs then score twice in the top of the ninth to regain the advantage, 10–9, only to see the slugging Giants come from behind on home runs by Mickey Witek and Walker Cooper to win, 13–10, in their half of the frame. Cooper's game-winning, three-run blow is his second, and the New Yorkers' fifth, four-bagger of the game.
- June 11 – In the process of batting .381 during the month of June, Jackie Robinson goes four-for-four, including a double and a triple, in the Brooklyn Dodgers' 5–4 defeat at the hands of the Cincinnati Reds at Ebbets Field. Three days from now, the rookie will embark on a 21-game hitting streak; by the time it ends July 4, his club will be in first place in the National League standings.
- June 13:
  - A pair of former 20-game winners change teams when the Giants acquire Mort Cooper from the Boston Braves for Bill Voiselle and cash.
  - The defending world-champion St. Louis Cardinals, who began this season 2–11, finally escape the National League basement with Red Munger's 3–0 blanking of the Brooklyn Dodgers at Sportsman's Park. The Cardinals, 21–28 today, will play at a 68–37 clip through season's end to finish second in the Senior Circuit.
  - Boston's Fenway Park hosts its first night game, a 5–3 triumph for the host Red Sox over the Chicago White Sox before a capacity crowd of 34,510. Only two MLB ballparks now lack arc lights for night contests: Detroit's Briggs Stadium, which will install them in 1948, and Chicago's Wrigley Field, which will not install them until 1988.
- June 14 – The Red Sox and White Sox swap right-handed-hitting first basemen, with Boston sending Rudy York, 33, to Chicago for Jake Jones, 26.
- June 15 – By sweeping a doubleheader from the St. Louis Browns, the home-standing New York Yankees climb into first place in the American League with a 30–23 record. The Bombers surpass the Detroit Tigers, who have led since the first week of May; the Bengals today drop both ends of their twin bill to the Washington Senators at Griffith Stadium. While they'll share the top spot for one day (June 19) with the Red Sox, the Yankees will remain in first place for the rest of the season.
- June 18:
  - Ewell Blackwell pitches a no-hitter, leading the Cincinnati Reds to a 6–0 win over the Boston Braves at Crosley Field. "The Whip" walks four men and fans three. The Cincinnati offense is led by newcomer Babe Young, who blasts two three-run homers, while rookie Frankie Baumholtz collects four hits and scores twice and Grady Hatton adds a single, four walks and two runs scored.
  - Meanwhile, Johnny Pesky's fifth hit of the evening delivers a 15-inning, 6–5 win for the Boston Red Sox over the St. Louis Browns before 34,462 fans in Fenway Park's second-ever night game. The contest is unusual because, after the clubs play to a 2–2 deadlock after nine innings, they match each other by scoring three runs over the 13th and 14th frames before Pesky comes through in the 15th with two out. The game ends at 1:07 a.m. — barely averting a curfew that would have halted the contest as a 5–5 tie.
- June 22 – Cincinnati's Ewell Blackwell just misses pitching back-to-back no-hitters when Eddie Stanky of the Brooklyn Dodgers singles with one out in the ninth inning. Stanky's hit ends Blackwell's hitless-inning skein at 19. Blackwell also allows a single to Jackie Robinson two batters after Stanky to finish with a two-hitter. Blackwell's 4–0 triumph is his ninth consecutive victory and improves his record to 11–2.
- June 28 – Walker Cooper of the New York Giants hits a home run in his sixth consecutive game to tie a record set by George Kelly in 1924. Cooper had two homers in the first game of the streak, while his shot today helps his brother Morton defeat the Philadelphia Phillies, 14–6, for his first victory in a Giants uniform.
- June 29 – At Shibe Park, Ferris Fain lines an inside-the-park grand slam in the fifth inning, as the Philadelphia Athletics top the Boston Red Sox, 6–5.
- June 30 – The visiting Brooklyn Dodgers lash 14 hits, including three each by Arky Vaughan, Carl Furillo and Pee Wee Reese, to defeat the Philadelphia Phillies, 7–4, and move into a tie for first place with the idle Boston Braves. They'll remain in the NL's top spot for the remainder of the 1947 season.

=== July ===
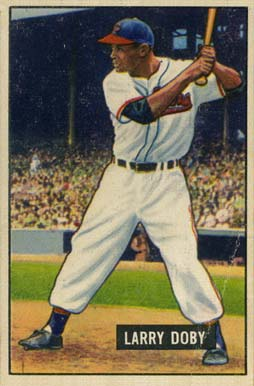
Larry Doby

- July 5:
  - Not quite three months after Jackie Robinson's National League debut, Larry Doby, 23, becomes the first black player in the American League, pinch-hitting for Bryan Stephens in the seventh inning of the Cleveland Indians' game against the Chicago White Sox at Comiskey Park. Facing right-hander Earl Harrist, Doby strikes out. He registers his first AL hit the following night.
    - Doby, then an infielder, had been a standout player with the Newark Eagles of the Negro National League: in 1946 he had led the NNL in hits, triples and the modern metric of OPS (1.030), and he followed that by hitting .354 with eight homers during the early weeks of the Eagles' 1947 season. However, his introduction to white baseball is much more abrupt than Robinson's, whose arrival in Brooklyn had been anticipated since his brilliant 1946 season with the Montreal Royals. Cleveland owner Bill Veeck, though a champion of integration, rushes Doby to the Indians only two days after signing him, bypassing the painstaking preparations Branch Rickey had undertaken for Robinson's debut.
    - Doby initially endures ostracism from white teammates and bats only .156 with five hits and a base on balls in 33 plate appearances, almost exclusively as a pinch hitter, in 1947. However, he will earn a regular job in 1948 when he moves to the outfield, bats .301 in 121 games, and becomes the first black player to earn a World Series ring, as well as the first to hit a home run in the Fall Classic. Doby will forge a 13-season American League career (1947–1959), be selected to seven All-Star teams, blast 253 home runs (leading the AL in both 1952 and 1954), then become MLB's second black manager (1978), and be elected to the Hall of Fame (1998). Looking back on his 1947 experience, he will say: "It was 11 weeks between the time Jackie Robinson and I came into the majors. I can’t see how things were any different for me than they were for him.”
  - MLB owners reject the Triple-A Pacific Coast League's petition that it be recognized as a third major league.
- July 8:
  - At Wrigley Field, home of the Chicago Cubs, the American League defeats the National League, 2–1, in the All-Star Game. Johnny Mize's fourth-inning solo homer plates the Nationals' only run.
  - The All-Star break sees the Brooklyn Dodgers (42–31) leading in a tight National League pennant race. They're one game ahead of the Boston Braves (40–31) and 1½ up on the New York Giants. In the American League, the white-hot New York Yankees (47–26) have opened up an eight-game lead on the Detroit Tigers (37–32) and Boston Red Sox (38–33).
- July 10 – Cleveland Indians right-hander Don Black tosses a no-hitter in a 3–0 win over the Philadelphia Athletics at Municipal Stadium. Black walks six, strikes out five, and defeats Bill McCahan, who will author the American League's other 1947 no-hitter on September 3.
- July 11 – In the nightcap of a doubleheader at the Polo Grounds, the St. Louis Cardinals and New York Giants combine for 20 runs and 18 hits—in the game's first two innings. When the smoke clears, the Giants lead 11–9 with seven innings yet to play. They shut out the Redbirds on two hits the rest of the way, to win 17–9. En route to a record for most home runs by a team during a 154-game season, the Giants belt six round-trippers in the game—including two each by Sid Gordon and Bill Rigney.
- July 17:
  - The New York Yankees win their 19th straight game, 7–2 over the Cleveland Indians, behind rookie Vic Raschi. Now 58–26, the Yankees have gone 30–3 since June 14 and their league lead reaches 11½ games.
  - The American League's last-place team, the St. Louis Browns, become the third AL or NL team to integrate its 1947 playing ranks. After the Browns conditionally purchase the contracts of two members of the Kansas City Monarchs, second baseman Hank Thompson and outfielder Willard Brown, Thompson, 21, becomes the Browns' first black player today at Sportsman's Park, starting against the Philadelphia Athletics and going hitless in four at bats in a 16–2 defeat.
    - Two days later, on July 19, the 32-year-old Willard Brown, who'll be elected to the Hall of Fame in 2006 to recognize his brilliant career with the Monarchs, makes his debut with St. Louis, going 0-for-3 as the starting centerfielder against the Boston Red Sox.
    - On July 20, the St. Louis Browns become the first AL or NL club to field two black players at the same time when both men start and play all nine innings of both games of a doubleheader with the visiting Red Sox. The Browns stun the Bosox by sweeping the twin bill, but Thompson and Brown go a combined 3-for-17.
- July 18 – Ralph Branca, 21-year-old Brooklyn Dodgers right-hander, notches a one-hit shutout against the St. Louis Cardinals at Ebbets Field. Enos Slaughter's eighth-inning single is the Redbirds' only hit. The top of Brooklyn's batting order, Eddie Stanky and Jackie Robinson, give Branca the support he needs, combining to go 5-for-8, scoring five runs, and driving in five.
- July 20 – Cardinals outfielder Ron Northey's long drive is simultaneously ruled "in play" and over Ebbets Field's center-field fence by umpires Larry Goetz and Beans Reardon in the top half of the ninth of today's game against the Dodgers. Deceived by Reardon's home-run call, Northey slows to a trot rounding third and is thrown out at the plate. His run would have made the score 3–0, St. Louis. Redbird manager Eddie Dyer officially protests the game because of the umpires' conflicting decisions. In the bottom of the ninth, Brooklyn tallies three runs to seemingly pull off a 3–2 victory. But NL president Ford Frick upholds the St. Louis protest: he restores Northey's homer (albeit as an "inside the park" blow) and St. Louis' third run. Frick rules that the contest is actually a 3–3 tie. It will be replayed in full on August 18, and the Dodgers will triumph, 12–3.
- July 25 – Sidewinder Ewell Blackwell wins his 16th straight decision dating to May 10, going all nine innings in a 5–4 Cincinnati Reds victory over the Philadelphia Phillies. His complete game is his 15th of this 16-victory span. At 18–2, he's responsible for 41.8% of Cincinnati's wins so far in 1947. Blackwell's streak will end July 30 when he absorbs a ten-inning, 5–4 setback against the New York Giants at Crosley Field.

=== August ===
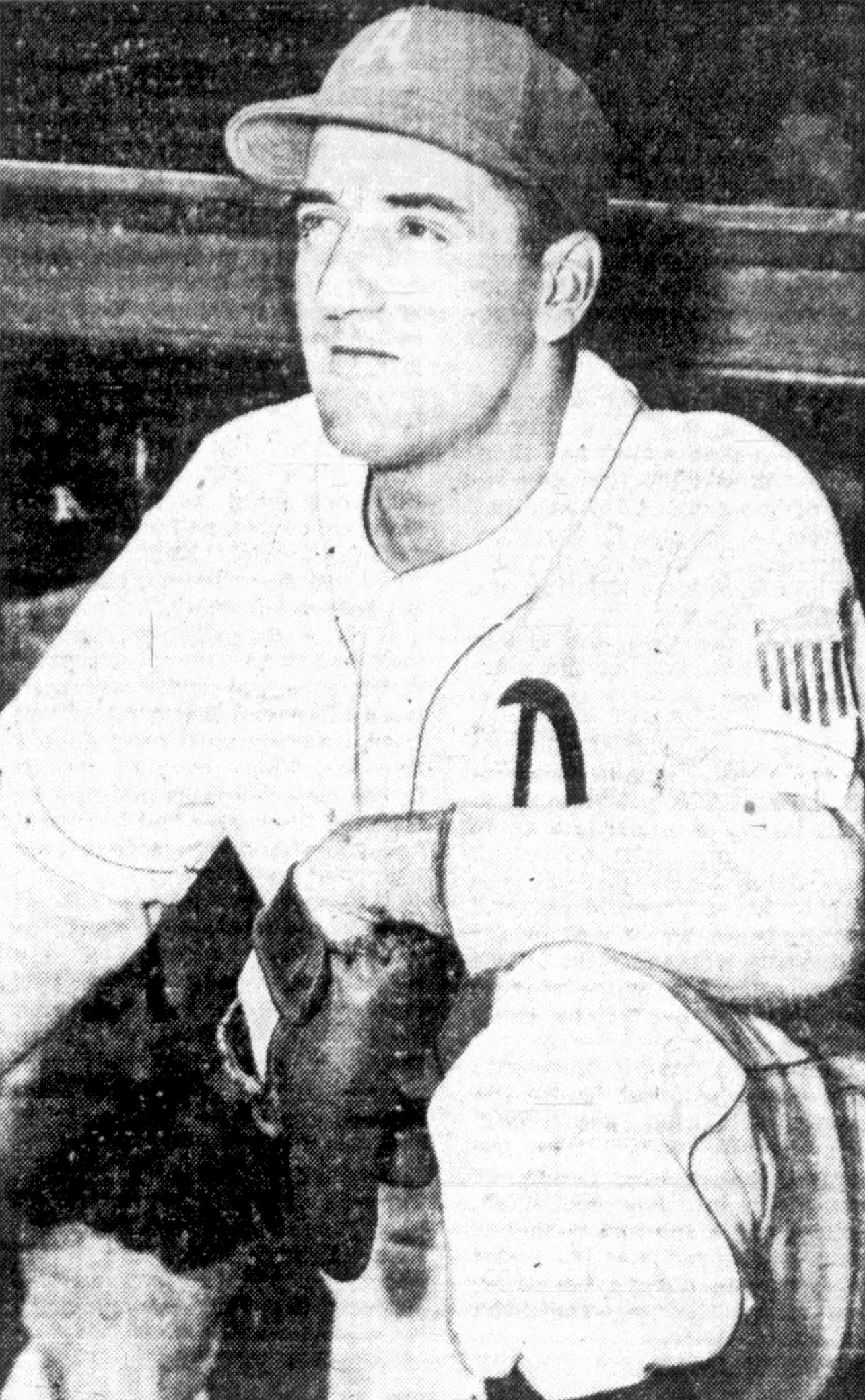
Phil Marchildon

- August 9 – Pitcher, World War II combat veteran, and former Prisoner of War Phil Marchildon of the Philadelphia Athletics registers his fourth consecutive complete game victory and goes three-for-four at the plate (including a home run) to defeat the Washington Senators, 8–1, at Shibe Park. Marchildon, who served as a flying officer in the Royal Canadian Air Force, survived being shot down over the Baltic Sea, hypothermia, and nine months as a POW after a bombing mission over Nazi Germany on August 16, 1944. His harrowing experiences led to recurring nightmares when he returned to civilian life and baseball in 1945. After winning 13 games for a 105-loss Philadelphia team in 1946, Marchildon, 33, comes back this season to post a 19–9, 3.22 record in 35 starts; his 19 wins are tied for second in the American League.
- August 12 – Right-hander Al Gettel of the Cleveland Indians hurls a one-hit shutout, and he and his teammates amass 15 hits and 11 runs, as Cleveland overwhelms the visiting Detroit Tigers. Eddie Mayo's first-inning double is the spoiler.
- August 13 – The St. Louis Browns' Willard Brown, pinch hitting with a man on base in the bottom of the eighth at Sportsman's Park, lashes a Hal Newhouser pitch off the center-field wall, then legs out a game-tying inside-the-park homer—becoming the first African-American player to hit a home run in American League history. The Browns go on to overcome the Tigers, 6–5.
- August 20:
  - At Ebbets Field, the onrushing St. Louis Cardinals ensure a split of their four-game series with the first-place Brooklyn Dodgers with a 12-inning, 3–2 victory. Whitey Kurowski's homer off Brooklyn relief ace Hugh Casey, only the fourth Redbird hit of the day, makes the difference. The Dodgers and Cardinals, bitter foes throughout most of the 1940s, are only 4½ games apart in the National League race. However, an 11th-inning incident—in which St. Louis' Enos Slaughter spikes Jackie Robinson during a play at first base—adds to the enmity: the Dodgers accuse Slaughter of deliberately trying to injure Robinson (who remains in the game), and Slaughter vehemently denies the charge.
  - Washington Senators relief pitcher Tom Ferrick loses both games of a doubleheader with the Cleveland Indians. While pitching with St. Louis the previous season, Ferrick had won both games of a doubleheader against the Philadelphia Athletics on August 4.
- August 23 – The St. Louis Browns release both Willard Brown and Hank Thompson and they return to the Kansas City Monarchs of the Negro American League. Brown had batted only .179 (12-for-67) with one homer and six runs batted in in 21 games; Thompson, .256 (20-for-78) with five RBI in 27 games. They had also encountered hostility from some white teammates and manager Muddy Ruel. In 1949 Thompson will break the New York Giants' color barrier, while Brown continues to star for the Monarchs. The Browns' next black player will be Hall of Famer Leroy "Satchel" Paige on July 18, 1951.
- August 26 – The Brooklyn Dodgers' Dan Bankhead becomes the National League's first black pitcher. He homers in his debut plate appearance, but doesn't fare well on the mound. In 31/3 innings of relief, he gives up ten hits and six earned runs to the Pittsburgh Pirates, who win the game, 16–3.
- August 28 – Two relief pitchers—Clyde Shoun of the Boston Braves and Eddie Erautt of the Cincinnati Reds—distinguish themselves in one of the National League's longest games of 1947, going ten and 92/3 innings respectively in today's 16-inning marathon at Braves Field. The game ends on a sour note for Erautt, as he walks Tommy Holmes with the bases loaded to seal an 8–7 Boston victory.

=== September ===
- September 1 – Jack Lohrke leads off the eighth inning with a home run off Red Barrett, giving the New York Giants and pitcher Larry Jansen a 2–1 victory over the Boston Braves in the opening game of a Labor Day doubleheader at the Polo Grounds. The 43,106 in attendance see history as Lohrke's homer is the Giants' 183rd of the season, surpassing the record of 182 bombs set by the 1936 New York Yankees. The Giants win the nightcap, 12–2; they will finish the season with 221 homers but struggle to finish fourth.
- September 3 – Bill McCahan of the Philadelphia Athletics no-hits the Washington Senators in a 3–0 victory. A second-inning error by first baseman Ferris Fain spoils McCahan's bid for a perfect game.
- September 14 – Rookie outfielder Vic Wertz of the Detroit Tigers hits for the cycle, going five-for-six in a 16–6 rout of the Senators at Griffith Stadium. Wertz, 22, joins Bobby Doerr (May 13) as the only big-leaguers to register a "cycle" in 1947.
- September 15:
  - Red Ruffing of the Chicago White Sox gives up 12 hits over seven innings in a 7–5 loss to the Boston Red Sox in what proves to be his final MLB appearance. The future Hall of Famer, 42, will be released two weeks later, ending his major league career with 273 victories over 22 seasons.
  - Earlier today, Ruffing's former team, the New York Yankees (for whom he went 231–124), had clinched their 15th American League pennant (all won since 1921) when the White Sox took the opening game of today's Fenway Park doubleheader, 6–3, behind Orval Grove. The Yankees end a three-year pennant "drought."
  - The 22-year-long playing career of Mel Ott draws to a close when the 38-year-old slugger is released by the New York Giants. Future Hall of Famer Ott retires with 511 career home runs, most in National League history. He remains the Giants' manager, a job he's held since Opening Day of 1942.
- September 17:
  - With almost two weeks remaining in the 1947 regular season, the Baseball Writers' Association of America announces the winner of its first-ever Major League Rookie of the Year Award: Brooklyn Dodgers first baseman Jackie Robinson. The man who on April 15 broke the baseball color line today raises his batting average to .301 with two hits, including his 11th homer. A single MLB "ROTY" award will be selected this year and next before the honor is split into separate NL and AL awards.
  - Joe Dobson one-hits the St. Louis Browns and notches a 4–0 triumph for his second-place Red Sox at Fenway Park. Wally Judnich gets the Browns' lone hit in the seventh inning; Dobson walks six.
- September 20 – Ernie Lombardi draws his unconditional release from the New York Giants, ending his MLB career at age 39. A two-time National League batting champion despite being notoriously slow afoot, Lombardi will be elected to the Hall of Fame in 1986.
- September 22 – The Brooklyn Dodgers, who sit idle today, clinch their seventh National League title and first since 1941 when the second-place St. Louis Cardinals are eliminated from contention by splitting their doubleheader against the Chicago Cubs at Sportsman's Park. As in 1941, the Dodgers will face the Yankees in 1947's "subway series."
- September 25 – Future Hall of Fame second baseman Billy Herman, 38, steps down as manager of the Pittsburgh Pirates after less than full season at the helm. He's led the Bucs to a 61–92 record, good enough for a tie for seventh in the National League, 33½ lengths behind Brooklyn. Herman also had played sparingly, putting himself into only 15 games and hitting a paltry .213.
- September 27:
  - The New York Cubans overcome a 5–0 deficit with six unanswered runs to defeat the Cleveland Buckeyes, 6–5, in the decisive Game 6 of the 1947 Negro World Series at League Park. Pat Scantlebury sparkles for the Cubans, throwing seven innings of shutdown relief and contributing three hits to the winning cause.
  - Rookie Bobby Thomson's 29th home run of 1947 enables his New York Giants to set the new modern MLB record for home runs in a season, with 221 in 155 official games. The 1956 Cincinnati Redlegs will equal that mark nine years later.
- September 28 – Ted Williams singles twice in four at bats in his 156th game of the season to win his second American League Triple Crown. In addition to leading his circuit in batting (.343), home runs (32), and runs batted in (114), he tops it in runs scored (125), bases on balls received (162), on-base percentage (.499), slugging percentage (.634), and intentional walks (29). Williams previously won the AL Triple Crown in 1942, on the eve of his World War II military service.
- September 29 – Legendary manager Joe McCarthy, who won 1,460 regular-season games, eight AL pennants, and seven World Series in all or part of 16 seasons (1931 to May 23, 1946) at the rudder of the New York Yankees, takes over their rivals to the northeast, the Boston Red Sox, for 1948. McCarthy, 60, who has spent the past 16 months in retirement, succeeds Joe Cronin, who in turn moves up to general manager, replacing Eddie Collins, who steps aside due to declining health. Cronin, 40, has been manager of the Bosox since 1935, and Collins, 60, their GM since 1933, but their efforts have produced only one AL pennant. Collins is already a Hall of Famer (1939), and Cronin (1956) and McCarthy (1957) will follow.

=== October ===
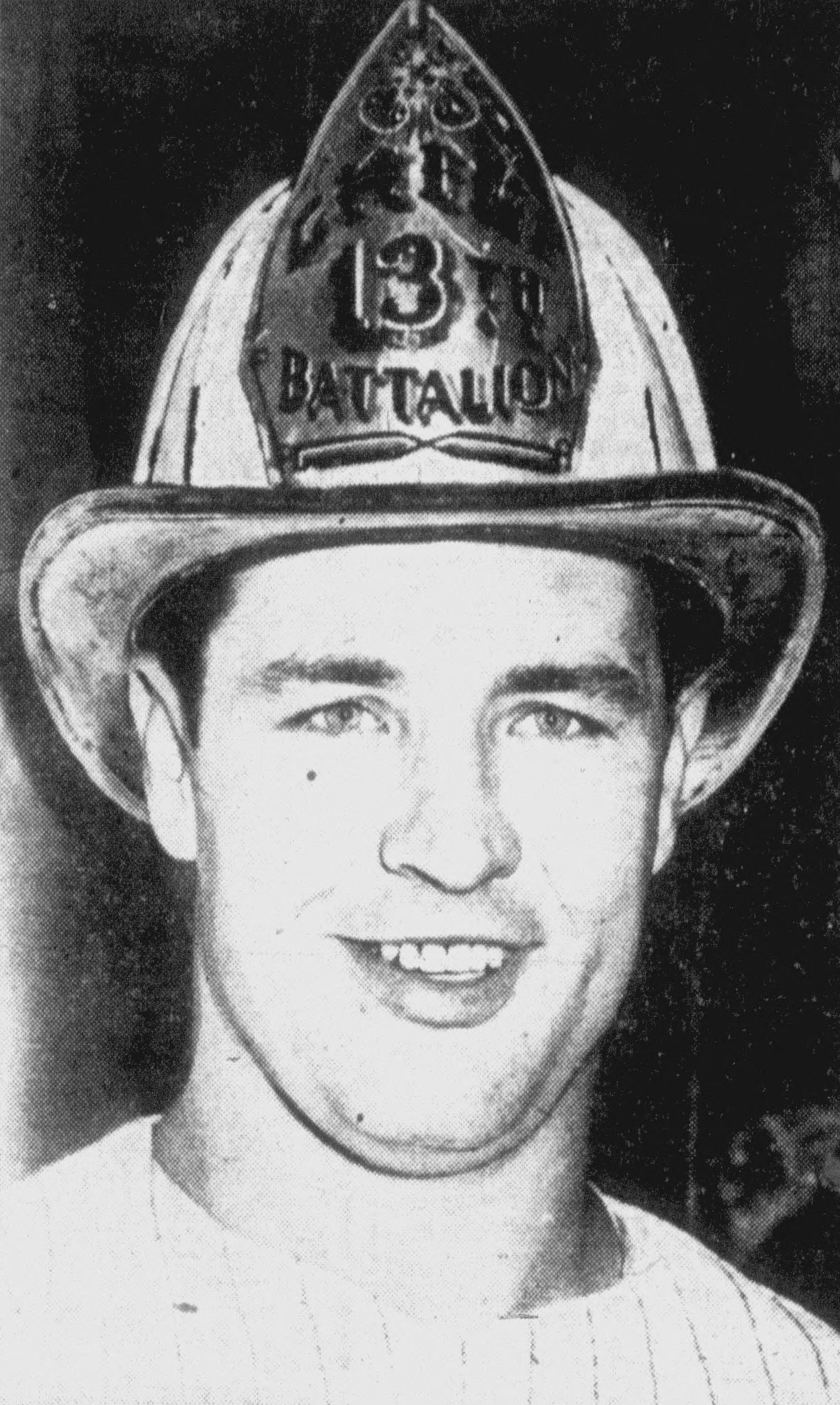
The Yankees' "fireman," Joe Page

- September 30–October 6 – The 1947 World Series, the 44th match between the pennant-winners of the American and National leagues, goes the limit before the New York Yankees defeat the Brooklyn Dodgers, 5–2, in Game 7 to win their eleventh world championship, four games to three. The 1947 Fall Classic is notable on several fronts.
  - It's the first World Series to feature a team with a racially integrated roster: rookie Brooklyn first baseman Jackie Robinson, who broke the baseball color line on April 15, starts all seven games, collects seven hits, including two doubles, in 27 at bats (.259), scores three runs, drives in three, and steals two bases. In addition, Dodger pitcher Dan Bankhead pinch runs for Bobby Bragan in Game 6, and scores Brooklyn's seventh tally in an 8–6 win.
  - It's the first Series to be telecast, although coverage is limited to New York City, Philadelphia, Washington, D.C., and Schenectady/Albany, New York. The TV industry is in its infancy, with only 44,000 to 100,000 sets in U.S. homes, retail store windows, and dining and drinking establishments. Billboard will estimate that 3.9 million viewers took advantage of the new medium to watch the action.
  - It marks the return of the Yankees' 50-year-old manager, Bucky Harris, to the Fall Classic after an absence of 22 years; the "Boy Wonder" playing skipper of the Washington Senators had led his teams to the 1924 championship and a heart-breaking loss to the Pittsburgh Pirates the following season.
  - Above all, it features three memorable highlights.
    - In Game 4 on October 3 at Ebbets Field, the Yankees' Bill Bevens—though issuing ten bases on balls over 82/3 innings—comes within one out of the first no-hit game in World Series history, only to be foiled by pinch hitter Cookie Lavagetto's double that scores Brooklyn's tying and winning runs.
    - Then, in the sixth inning of Game 6 on October 5 at Yankee Stadium, Al Gionfriddo robs Joe DiMaggio of extra bases, perhaps a game-tying homer, when he makes a running catch of DiMaggio's deep drive to the bullpen fence, 415 feet (126 m) from the plate in left-center.
    - And in Game 7 on October 6, Bevens and left-handed bullpen ace Joe Page combine for 71/3 innings of three-hit, shutout relief to enable the Yankees to claw back from a 2–0 deficit and win the deciding contest by scoring five unanswered runs.
- October 2 – The Pittsburgh Pirates hire longtime minor-league manager Billy Meyer, 54, as their new field leader, signing him to a two-year contract for the highest salary ever paid a Pirate skipper. Meyer has compiled a highly successful record in the New York Yankees' organization, with his teams winning four championships and finishing second four times over the past decade. The Pirates today also unconditionally release first baseman Hank Greenberg, ending the future Hall-of-Fame slugger's playing career after 13 MLB seasons and 331 home runs.
- October 6 – Minutes after winning the 1947 World Series, his first championship as an executive, New York Yankees' one-third-owner Larry MacPhail resigns as club president and general manager, then confronts fellow co-owner Dan Topping and farm system director George Weiss at the team's victory party. The following day, Topping and co-owner Del Webb acquire MacPhail's one-third interest in the Bombers, and promote Weiss to general manager. His bizarre departure from the Yankees marks the end of MacPhail's brilliant but erratic baseball career at age 57; he'll be elected posthumously to the Hall of Fame in 1978. Topping and Webb will co-own the Yankees until they sell the franchise to CBS in 1964.
- October 9 – The Washington Senators name former stalwart first baseman Joe Kuhel, 41, their manager for 1948. Kuhel retired from the playing ranks in May 1947; he batted .288 in 1,205 games over 11 seasons with Washington (1930–1937, 1944–1946). He succeeds Ossie Bluege, the club's manager since 1943, who becomes the Senators' farm system director.
- October 24 – The Cleveland Indians release pitcher Mel Harder, a 20-year veteran who won 223 games in a Cleveland uniform. He remains with the club as its pitching coach.

=== November ===
- November 4 – Muddy Ruel is dropped as manager of the St. Louis Browns after one season at the helm. His team finished last in the American League at 59–95 in 1947. Former Browns coach and interim manager James "Zack" Taylor, 49, will take his place.
- November 12 – The St. Louis Browns select second baseman Garvin Hamner from Memphis of the Double-A Southern Association in the minor league draft. Garvin is the elder brother of Philadelphia Phillies' prospect Granny Hamner, a future three-time NL All-Star, and reports at the time claim the Browns mistook the two Hamners, and drafted the wrong brother. A St. Louis spokesman denies the charge.
- November 17 – The cash-strapped Browns make the first of two blockbuster trades with the wealthy Boston Red Sox, sending hard-hitting, three-time AL All-Star shortstop Vern Stephens and pitcher Jack Kramer to the Bosox for $310,000 and six players: pitchers Joe Ostrowski, Al Widmar and Jim Wilson, catcher Roy Partee, infielder Eddie Pellagrini and outfielder Pete Layden. Playing home games at Fenway Park, Stephens will average 144 runs batted in over the next three seasons, and Kramer will win 18 games for Boston in 1948.
- November 18:
  - One day after the massive Vern Stephens trade, the Browns and Red Sox make another major, one-sided deal that favors Boston. In it, St. Louis sends pitcher Ellis Kinder and infielder Billy Hitchcock to the Red Sox for $65,000, pitcher Clem Dreisewerd and infielders Sam Dente and Bill Sommers. Right-hander Kinder will win 23 games as a starting pitcher for the 1949 Red Sox, then become their bullpen ace during the early 1950s, leading the American League in saves twice (1951, 1953).
  - The Pittsburgh Pirates acquire first baseman Johnny Hopp and second baseman Danny Murtaugh from the Boston Braves for pitcher Al Lyons, catcher Bill Salkeld and centerfielder Jim Russell. The trade begins Murtaugh's long career with the Pirates, during which he will serve 15 years over four terms as their manager, and lead Pittsburgh to the 1960 and 1971 world championships.
- November 20 – Boston Braves third baseman Bob Elliott is selected 1947's National League Most Valuable Player by the Baseball Writers' Association of America. Pitcher Ewell Blackwell of the Cincinnati Reds is the runner-up by 30 points.
- November 25 – Sam Breadon and his minority partners sell the St. Louis Cardinals to former United States Postmaster General Robert E. Hannegan, 44, and St. Louis attorney Fred Saigh, 42. Breadon, 71, became the Redbirds' president and largest stockholder in 1920 and principal owner two years later; under him they won nine National League pennants and six World Series titles. The deal—which includes the team, the Cardinals' extensive network of owned-and-operated minor-league farm clubs and assets, and cash and securities set aside for the construction of a new baseball park—is valued at $4.06 million.
- November 27 – Triple Crown winner Ted Williams (.343 BA, 32 home runs, 114 RBI) of the Boston Red Sox is edged out by Joe DiMaggio (.315, 20, 97) for the American League MVP Award by one point. Controversy erupts when it's reported that one BBWAA member has failed to include Williams anywhere on his ballot.
- November 30 – Guillermo Vento becomes the first Venezuelan Professional Baseball League player to make six hits in a single game. His record will eventually be matched by Pete Koegel (1974), Steve Carter (1991) and Ramón Flores (2014).

=== December ===
- December 4:
  - The Boston Braves purchase the contract of veteran outfielder Jeff Heath from the St. Louis Browns. Heath, 32, is a two-time American League All-Star who has batted .291 with 97 homers over 12 seasons in the Junior Circuit. In 1948, his .319 average and 20 homers will help power Boston to the National League pennant.
  - The New York Giants acquire first baseman and minor-league slugger Jack Harshman from San Diego of the Pacific Coast League for three players and $65,000. In the majors, Harshman will falter as a batsman before he converts to the pitching mound, where the left-hander will win 69 games for four American League teams between 1954 and 1960.
- December 8:
  - The NL champion Brooklyn Dodgers trade four-time NL All-Star outfielder Dixie Walker and pitchers Hal Gregg and Vic Lombardi to the Pittsburgh Pirates for pitcher Preacher Roe, third baseman Billy Cox and utilily infielder Gene Mauch. Walker, 37, became one of the Dodgers' most popular players during his nine-season tenure in Brooklyn. But left-handed hurler Roe will win 93 games and Cox will provide stellar infield defense for three Brooklyn pennant-winners through 1954.
  - Leo Durocher, 42, is reinstated as the Dodgers' manager after serving a year-long suspension imposed by Commissioner Happy Chandler for "conduct detrimental to baseball." Burt Shotton, who led the 1947 Dodgers to the National League championship as acting manager, is given a post in the Brooklyn front office.
  - The contract of veteran second baseman Jerry Priddy, once a prized New York Yankees prospect, is sold by the Washington Senators to the St. Louis Browns. A top-flight fielder and dangerous hitter, Priddy, 28, has been hampered by injuries during his career.
- December 10:
  - The Cincinnati Reds sell the contract of pitcher Elmer Riddle to the Pittsburgh Pirates. Former 21-game-winner Riddle, 33, is coming back from arm miseries. He'll win 12 games for the 1948 Pirates and be selected to the 1948 NL All-Star team.
  - The Washington Senators trade outfielder and four-time AL All-Star Stan Spence to the Boston Red Sox for second baseman Al Kozar and outfielder Leon Culberson.
- December 11:
  - The Cleveland Indians deal pitcher Red Embree to the New York Yankees for outfielder Allie Clark.
  - Brooklyn Dodgers general manager Branch Rickey announces an agreement with Florida entrepreneur Bud Holman and the City of Vero Beach to rent 104 acres of a decommissoned World War II naval airstation as the site of "Dodgertown," a first-of-its kind training facility capable of housing hundreds of minor-league ballplayers. The team will pay $1 a year in rent and take over maintenance. The big-league Dodgers will move their training camp there in 1949, and on March 11, 1953, they'll open a new baseball field, Holman Stadium, for Grapefruit League games.
- December 16 – The Detroit Tigers sell the contract of journeyman veteran outfielder Roy Cullenbine, who socked 24 homers in 1947, to the Philadelphia Phillies. Cullenbine, 34, will be released by the Phils in April 1948, ending his playing career.
- December 29 – The Washington Senators release catcher-coach Rick Ferrell from his playing contract, ending his active career. Ferrell, 42, has set an American League record by catching in 1,806 games over 18 seasons beginning in 1929. He'll stay in the game as a coach and front office executive, and be elected to the Hall of Fame by the Veterans Committee in 1984.

== Births ==
=== January ===
- January 1 – Jimmie Lee Solomon
- January 4 – Ken Reynolds
- January 5 – Sandy Vance
- January 7 – Scott Reid
- January 12:
  - Leon Everitt
  - Gene Martin
  - Paul Reuschel
- January 15:
  - Gerry Schoen
  - Tony Solaita
- January 18 – Sachio Kinugasa
- January 21:
  - Bob Reynolds
  - Bill Stein
- January 22 – Senichi Hoshino
- January 23 – Kurt Bevacqua
- January 27:
  - John Lowenstein
  - Tim Plodinec
- January 30 – Matt Alexander
- January 31 – Nolan Ryan

=== February ===
- February 1:
  - Jim McKee
  - Danny Thompson
- February 3 – Joe Coleman
- February 5 – Barry Raziano
- February 7 – Ted Ford
- February 16 – Terry Crowley
- February 20 – Tom Buskey
- February 21:
  - Terry Ley
  - Charley Walters
- February 25 – Ken Szotkiewicz

=== March ===
- March 2 – Jim Nettles
- March 4 – Bruce Miller
- March 5 – Kent Tekulve
- March 7 – Jim Howarth
- March 10 – Darcy Fast
- March 12:
  - Bill Butler
  - Greg Garrett
- March 14 – Mike Strahler
- March 16 – Tom Bradley
- March 19:
  - Garry Jestadt
  - Ángel Mangual
  - Don Rose
- March 21 – Bill Plummer
- March 23 – Pat Bourque

=== April ===
- April 4 – Ray Fosse
- April 14 – Joe Lahoud
- April 17 – Tsutomu Wakamatsu
- April 21 – Al Bumbry
- April 23 – Pat Jacquez
- April 26 – Amos Otis
- April 28 – Lute Barnes
- April 29:
  - Tom House
  - Jim Williams
- April 30 – Jim Clark

=== May ===
- May 5 – Larry Hisle
- May 10:
  - John Cumberland
  - Tim Hosley
- May 12:
  - Vic Albury
  - Bob Heise
- May 13 – Steve Kealey
- May 14 – Dick Tidrow
- May 22 – Rich Hinton
- May 26 – Darrell Evans

=== June ===
- June 4 – Doug Griffin
- June 7:
  - Don Money
  - Thurman Munson
- June 10 – Ken Singleton
- June 16 – Joe Decker
- June 25 – José Ortiz

=== July ===
- July 4:
  - Jim Minshall
  - Jim Nelson
- July 6:
  - Néstor Chávez
  - Lance Clemons
- July 11 – Ron Cook
- July 12 – Scipio Spinks
- July 14:
  - Steve Stone
  - Danny Walton
- July 15 – Enrique Romo
- July 22:
  - Cliff Johnson
  - George Lauzerique
- July 25:
  - Mick Kelleher
  - Mickey Scott
- July 30 – Jim Spencer
- July 31:
  - Pete Koegel
  - Earl Stephenson
  - John Vukovich

=== August ===
- August 1 – Tony Muser
- August 4 – Ken Poulsen
- August 5 – Bernie Carbo
- August 6 – Jim Dunegan
- August 8 – José Cruz
- August 9 – Buddy Hunter
- August 13:
  - Jerry Crawford
  - Fred Stanley
- August 15 – Billy Conigliaro
- August 18:
  - Bucky Guth
  - Lowell Palmer
- August 22 – Bill Burbach
- August 27 – Jim York
- August 31 – Boots Day

=== September ===
- September 1 – Craig Skok
- September 2 – Mel Behney
- September 3 – Bill Gilbreth
- September 7 – Dave Wallace
- September 11 – Larry Cox
- September 12 – John Montague
- September 13 – Mike Adamson
- September 14 – Harry Parker
- September 16 – Gary Ross
- September 17 – Candy Harris
- September 18 – Bill Champion
- September 20 – Pete Hamm
- September 21 – Jim Todd
- September 24 – Norm Angelini
- September 26 – Norm McRae

=== October ===
- October 1:
  - Buzz Capra
  - Remigio Hermoso
- October 3 – Chuck Scrivener
- October 4 – Glenn Adams
- October 6:
  - Jerry Bell
  - Rich Hacker
  - Steve Kline
  - Charlie Vaughan
- October 9 – Bob Moose
- October 10 – Roger Metzger
- October 11:
  - Rick James
  - Charlie Williams
- October 17 – Jim Hutto
- October 20 – Rafael Robles
- October 26 – Bill Gogolewski

=== November ===
- November 4 – Loyd Colson
- November 6:
  - Chris Arnold
  - Skip Pitlock
- November 7:
  - Yutaka Fukumoto
  - Don Newhauser
- November 8 – Lewis Yocum
- November 12 – Ron Bryant
- November 13 – Gene Garber
- November 17 – Tom Dettore
- November 19 – Bob Boone
- November 22:
  - Sandy Alderson
  - John Morlan
- November 23:
  - Dwain Anderson
  - Tom Hall
- November 23 – Frank Tepedino
- November 26:
  - Larry Gura
  - Richie Hebner
- November 27 – John Harrell

=== December ===
- December 3:
  - Wayne Garrett
  - Gerry Pirtle
- December 7 – Johnny Bench
- December 9 – Jerry Cram
- December 10 – Ted Martínez
- December 11 – Greg Shanahan
- December 13 – Dave Hamilton
- December 15 – Ken Crosby
- December 17 – Charlie Sands
- December 21 – Elliott Maddox
- December 26 – Carlton Fisk
- December 28 – Aurelio Rodríguez
- December 31 – Manny Muñiz

== Deaths ==
=== January ===
- January 2 – Joe Koukalik, 66, one of four Austrian players in Major League Baseball history, who pitched eight innings in one baseball game for the Brooklyn Superbas in the 1904 season.
- January 15 – Jimmy Sheckard, 68, left fielder and leadoff hitter who played for eight different teams in a span of 17 seasons between 1897 and 1913, most notably for the Chicago Cubs from 1906 to 1912, a period in which the Cubs won four National League pennants and two World Series titles in 1907 and 1908.
- January 20 – Josh Gibson, 35, Negro leagues All-Star catcher who is considered by baseball historians as one of the best power hitters and catchers in the history of any league, including Major League Baseball, becoming the second Negro league player to be inducted in the National Baseball Hall of Fame behind Satchel Paige.
- January 21 – Jimmy Walsh, 60, third baseman who played from 1910 through 1915 for the Philadelphia Phillies, Baltimore Terrapins and St. Louis Terriers.
- January 29 – Del Gainer, 60, solid first baseman and line drive hitter who played for the Detroit Tigers, Boston Red Sox and St. Louis Cardinals (1922) during ten seasons between 1909 and 1922.
- January 31 – Johnny Kling, 71, catcher who was key part of the great Chicago Cubs dynasty from the early 1900s.

=== February ===
- February 5 – Ed Callahan, 89, outfielder and shortstop who played in 1894 for the St. Louis Maroons, Kansas City Cowboys and Boston Reds clubs of the outlaw Federal League.
- February 9 – Dan Barry, 60, American League umpire in 1928 who worked 132 games in his lone AL season; one of only six umpires to eject Lou Gehrig from a game; former sportswriter.
- February 10:
  - Carney Flynn, 72, pitcher who played with the Cincinnati Reds in 1894 and for the New York Giants and Washington Senators in 1896.
  - George Whiteman, 64, outfielder for the 1918 Boston Red Sox World Champions.
- February 11 – Jim Stanley, born Stanislaus Francis Ciolek, 59, shortstop for Chicago of the Federal League in 1914.
- February 13 – Sam Shaw, 83, pitcher who played with the Baltimore Orioles of the American Association in 1888 and for the Chicago Colts of the National League in 1893.
- February 19 – Hooks Warner, 52, third baseman who played for the Chicago Cubs and the Pittsburgh Pirates in part of four seasons spanning 1916–1921.
- February 23 – George Brickley, 52, two-sport athlete who played as an outfielder for the 1913 Philadelphia Athletics, and later played football as a tailback for the Cleveland Tigers and the New York Brickley Giants.
- February 24 – Jack Glasscock, 89, flashy fielding shortstop of the 19th century, and the sixth player to collect at least 2,000 hits; played 17 seasons (1879–1875) for nine different teams, and won 1890 National League batting crown.
- February 27:
  - Ensign Cottrell, 58, pitcher who played from 1911 to 1915 with the Pittsburgh Pirates, Chicago Cubs, Philadelphia Athletics, Boston Braves and New York Yankees.
  - Jack Calhoun, 67, third baseman the 1902 St. Louis Cardinals.
- February 28:
  - Clarence Stephens, 83, pitcher who played with the Cincinnati Red Stockings in 1886 and for the Cincinnati Reds in 1891.
  - Ike Fisher, 75, catcher and third baseman for the Philadelphia Phillies in its 1898 season, who later managed and owned the Nashville Vols club of the Southern Association.

=== March ===
- March 2 – Dewey Metivier, 48, pitcher who played for the Cleveland Indians from 1922 to 1924.
- March 7 – Dan McGarvey, 57, left fielder who played for the Detroit Tigers in the 1912 season.
- March 20 – Mike Mowrey, 62, outstanding third baseman during the Deadball Era, who played from 1905 through 1915 for five different National League clubs, and was a member of the Brooklyn Robins team who were defeated by the strong Boston Red Sox in the 1916 World Series.
- March 22 – Tony Von Fricken, 77, pitcher for the 1890 Boston Beaneaters.
- March 26 – Jim Bluejacket, 59, pitcher who played from 1914 to 1915 with the Brooklyn Tip-Tops and for the Cincinnati Reds in 1916.
- March 27 – Pete Lister, 65, first baseman who played in 22 games for the Cleveland Naps during the 1907 season.
- March 28 – Johnny Evers, 65, Hall of Fame second baseman who along shortstop Joe Tinker and first baseman Frank Chance formed the most famous double play combination in Major League history, which is memorialized in the legendary poem Baseball's Sad Lexicon, as the trio led the Chicago Cubs during the glory years of 1906–1910 to four National League pennants and two World Series.

=== April ===
- April 2:
  - Charlie Jones, 72, a fine defensive outfielder with a strong arm, who played for the Boston Americans, Chicago White Sox, Washington Senators and St. Louis Browns between 1901 and 1908.
  - Mike Lynch, 71, center fielder for the 1902 Chicago Orphans of the National League.
- April 4 – Jot Goar, 77, pitcher who played with the Pittsburgh Pirates in 1896 and for the Cincinnati Reds in 1898.
- April 12 – Tom Sullivan, 87, pitcher for the Columbus Buckeyes and Kansas City Cowboys in parts of four seasons spanning 1884–1889.
- April 20 – Jack Rothfuss, 75, first baseman for the 1897 Pittsburgh Pirates.
- April 21 – Steamer Flanagan, 66, outfielder who played for the Pittsburgh Pirates in 1905.
- April 25 – John Walsh, 68, third baseman who played for the Philadelphia Phillies in the 1903 season.

=== May ===
- May 1:
  - Kitty Bransfield, 72, first baseman who played for the Boston Beaneaters, Pittsburgh Pirates, Philadelphia Phillies and Chicago Cubs in a span of 12 seasons from 1898 to 1911.
  - Ray Brubaker, 54, veteran minor league player and manager; died in the dugout from a heart attack while managing the Terre Haute Phillies in an Illinois–Indiana–Iowa League game.
- May 2 – Ossie France, 88, pitcher for the 1890 Chicago Colts of the National League.
- May 5 – Ty LaForest, 30, Canadian third baseman who played for the Boston Red Sox in 1945, one of many ballplayers who only appeared in the major leagues during World War II conflict.
- May 6 – Ferdie Moore, 51, first baseman who played for the Philadelphia Athletics during the 1914 season.
- May 7 – Michael McDermott, 83, pitcher who played for the Louisville Colonels of the American Association during the 1889 season.
- May 18 – Hal Chase, 64, outstanding first baseman whose big league career lasted from 1905 to 1919, who was the most notoriously corrupt player in Major League history and was barred from baseball after a reputed long history of fixing games.
- May 19 – Tex Hoffman, 53, third baseman for the 1915 Cleveland Indians.
- May 21 – Dan Kennard, 63, catcher whose career began in Black baseball in 1913 and continued after the formation of the Negro National League for the St. Louis Giants/Stars (1920–1923) and Detroit Stars (1925).
- May 23:
  - Harry Bemis, 73, catcher who played from 1902 through 1910 for the Cleveland Naps of the American League.
  - Goat Cochran, 56, pitcher who played for the Cincinnati Reds in the 1915 season.
- May 24 – Atkins Collins, 37, pitcher for the 1932 Baltimore Black Sox of the East–West League.
- May 27:
  - Ed Konetchy, 61, who led National League first basemen in fielding seven times and batted .281 in 2,085 games over 15 seasons (1907–1921); his 2,150 career hits included 181 triples, 17th all time.
  - Harry Sage, 83, catcher who played in 1890 for the Toledo Maumees of the American Association.
- May 31 – Jimmie Wilson, 46, two-time All-Star catcher who played 1,525 games over 18 seasons (1923–1940) with three National League clubs; won World Series rings with the 1931 St. Louis Cardinals and 1940 Cincinnati Reds; managed Philadelphia Phillies (1934–1938) and Chicago Cubs (1941 to April 30, 1944) to a combined 493–735 (.401) record.

=== June ===
- June 12 – Eugene Scott, 57, catcher for the 1920 Detroit Stars of the Negro National League.
- June 15 – Luke Stuart, second baseman who played in 1921 for the St. Louis Browns, also one of two players to hit an inside-the-park home run in their first Major League Baseball at bat, the other being Johnnie LeMaster, who did it with the San Francisco Giants in 1975.
- June 18:
  - Neal Brady, 50, pitcher who played with the New York Yankees in the 1915 and 1917 seasons and for the Cincinnati Reds in 1925.
  - Jumbo Harting, 82, catcher who played in 1886 for the St. Louis Browns of the National League.
- June 20 – Bob Ewing, 74, pitcher who played from 1902 through 1912 for the Cincinnati Reds, Philadelphia Phillies, and St. Louis Cardinals.
- June 30 – Mellie Wolfgang, 57, pitcher for the Chicago White Sox in five seasons from 1914 to 1918.

=== July ===
- July 4 – Jeff Sweeney, 58, catcher for the New York Highlanders/Yankees in the early 1900s, who in 1914 stole 19 bases, the most ever by a Yankee catcher in a single season.
- July 7 – Dick Egan, infielder who played from 1908 through 1916 for the Cincinnati Reds, Brooklyn Robins and Boston Braves.
- July 8 – William G. Bramham, 72, president of the Minor Leagues from 1932 to 1946.
- July 14 – Orval Overall, 66, pitcher for the 1907/1908 World Champion Chicago Cubs; a right-handed curveball specialist who compiled a lifetime 108–71 record with a 2.23 earned run average, the eighth best ERA in Major League history.
- July 16 – Bill Keen, 54, first baseman who played for the Pittsburgh Pirates in the 1911 season.
- July 29 – George Bausewine, 78, pitcher for the 1889 Philadelphia Athletics, and later an umpire in the National League.
- July 30:
  - Chick Robitaille, 68, Franco-American pitcher who had a solid career with the Athletics club of the Quebec Provincial League in the late 1890s, and later posted a 12–8 record with a 2.56 ERA in 26 games for the Pittsburgh Pirates from 1904 to 1905.
  - Ed Seward, 80, Philadelphia Athletics pitcher who averaged 27 wins from 1887 to 1889, with a career-high 35 in 1888.

=== August ===
- August 3:
  - Curtis Harris, 42, infielder/catcher for the Cleveland Stars, Pittsburgh Crawfords and Philadelphia Stars of the East–West and Negro National leagues between 1932 and 1940.
  - Al Tesch, 56, second baseman who played for the Brooklyn Tip-Tops in the 1915 season.
  - Vic Willis, 71, Hall of Fame pitcher and an eight-time winner of 20 games, a key member of the pennant winning Boston Beaneaters as a rookie in 1898 and also a member of the 1909 world champion Pittsburgh Pirates, who finished with 249 wins, 1651 strikeouts and a 2.63 ERA in only a thirteen-year career.
- August 6 – Gene Good, 64, outfielder for the 1906 Boston Beaneaters.
- August 11 – Harry Davis, 74, first baseman and one of the most feared sluggers in the early 1900s, known today primarily for leading in home runs during four consecutive seasons, while guiding the Philadelphia Athletics teams who dominated the newly formed American League, winning six pennants and three World Series between 1902 and 1913, over a career that spanned more than thirty years as a player, coach, manager and scout.
- August 14 – Woody Crowson, 28, pitcher for the 1945 Philadelphia Athletics of the American League.
- August 15:
  - Bill Hall, 53, pitcher for the 1913 Brooklyn Superbas of the National League.
  - Carlton Lord, 47, third baseman who played for the Philadelphia Phillies during the 1923 season.
- August 21:
  - King Brady, 66, who pitched with the Philadelphia Phillies, Pittsburgh Pirates, Boston Red Sox and Boston Braves in a span of four seasons between 1905 and 1912.
  - Jacob Fox, 67, pitcher for the Philadelphia Phillies during the 1902 season.
- August 26 – Hugh McQuillan, 51, pitcher who played from 1918 to 1927 for the Boston Braves and New York Giants; member of the 1922 World Series champion Giants.
- August 27 – Charles "She" Donahue, 70, infielder who played in 1904 for the St. Louis Cardinals and Philadelphia Phillies.

=== September ===
- September 5 – Bill Ludwig, 65, catcher who played in 1908 for the St. Louis Cardinals.
- September 6 – Joe Gingras, 53, pitcher who played for the Kansas City Packers of the outlaw Federal League in its 1915 season.
- September 8 – Ralph Pond, 59, outfielder who played briefly for the Boston Red Sox during the 1910 season.
- September 13 – Ed Lennon, 50, pitcher for the 1928 Philadelphia Phillies.
- September 26 – John McFarlin, 40, first- and second baseman for the 1932 Atlanta Black Crackers of the Negro Southern League.
- September 28:
  - Jim Cockman, 74, Canadian third baseman who played for the New York Highlanders in 1905.
  - Duke Kelleher, 53, catcher for the 1916 New York Giants.
- September 29 – Ed Walker, 73, English pitcher who played for the Cleveland Bronchos and Naps clubs from 1902 to 1903.
- September 30 – John Halla, 63, pitcher who played in 1905 for the Cleveland Naps.

=== October ===
- October 1 – Hub Northen, 61, outfielder who played from 1910 through 1912 for the St. Louis Browns, Cincinnati Reds and Brooklyn Dodgers.
- October 2:
  - Charles F. Adams, 70, co-owner, and briefly owner, of the Boston Braves/Bees from 1927 to 1940; most known as founder of Boston Bruins of the National Hockey League.
  - Billy Hulen, 77, shortstop who played in 1896 with the Philadelphia Phillies and for the Washington Senators in 1899.
  - Jim Kane, 65, first baseman for the 1908 Pittsburgh Pirates.
- October 10 – Slim Embry, 46, pitcher who played with the Chicago White Sox during the 1923 season.
- October 11 – Doc Martel, 64, catcher and first baseman who played from 1909 to 1910 for the Philadelphia Phillies and Boston Doves.
- October 15 – Pol Perritt, 56, pitcher who played 10 seasons from 1912 through 1921 for the St. Louis Cardinals, New York Giants and Detroit Tigers, while helping the Giants win the National League pennant in 1917.
- October 23 – Cy Rheam, 54, infield/outfield utility who played for the Pittsburgh Rebels of the Federal League in the 1914 and 1915 seasons.

=== November ===
- November 2 – Dot Fulghum, 47, infielder for the 1921 Philadelphia Athletics.
- November 7 – Cy Wright, 54, shortstop who played with the Chicago White Sox in the 1916 season.
- November 14 – Jack Hoey, 66, outfielder who played from 1906 through 1908 for the Boston Americans and Red Sox clubs.
- November 14 – Stub Smith, 73, shortstop who played for the Boston Beaneaters of the National League in 1898.
- November 21 – Slow Joe Doyle, 53, pitcher who played from 1906 to 1910 for the New York Highlanders and Cincinnati Reds.
- November 23 – Charlie Newman, 79, outfielder who played for the New York Giants and Chicago Colts in the 1892 season.

=== December ===
- December 7 – Jud Smith, 78, third baseman who played with the Cincinnati Reds, St. Louis Browns, Pittsburgh Pirates and Washington Senators of the National League in a span of four seasons from 1893 to 1898.
- December 9 – Bevo LeBourveau, 51, outfielder who played for the Philadelphia Phillies and the Philadelphia Athletics in all or parts of four seasons spanning 1919–1929.
- December 17 – Lee Viau, 81, pitcher who played from 1888 through 1892 for the Cincinnati's Red Stockings and Reds, Cleveland Spiders, Louisville Colonels and Boston Beaneaters.
- December 24 – Joe Cobb, 52, catcher who appeared in one game for the Detroit Tigers in the 1918 season.
- December 26:
  - Roxey Roach, 65, shortstop who played from 1910 to 1912 with the New York Highlanders and Washington Senators of the American League, and for the Buffalo Buffeds/Blues of the Federal League in 1915.
  - Phil Stremmel, 67, pitcher who played for the St. Louis Browns of the American League in the 1909 and 1910 seasons.
- December 29 – George Blaeholder, 43, pitcher for the St. Louis Browns, Philadelphia Athletics, and Cleveland Indians in 12 seasons between 1925 and 1936, who is most noted for popularizing the slider pitch.
