= Johnny Beazley =

American baseball player (1918–1990)

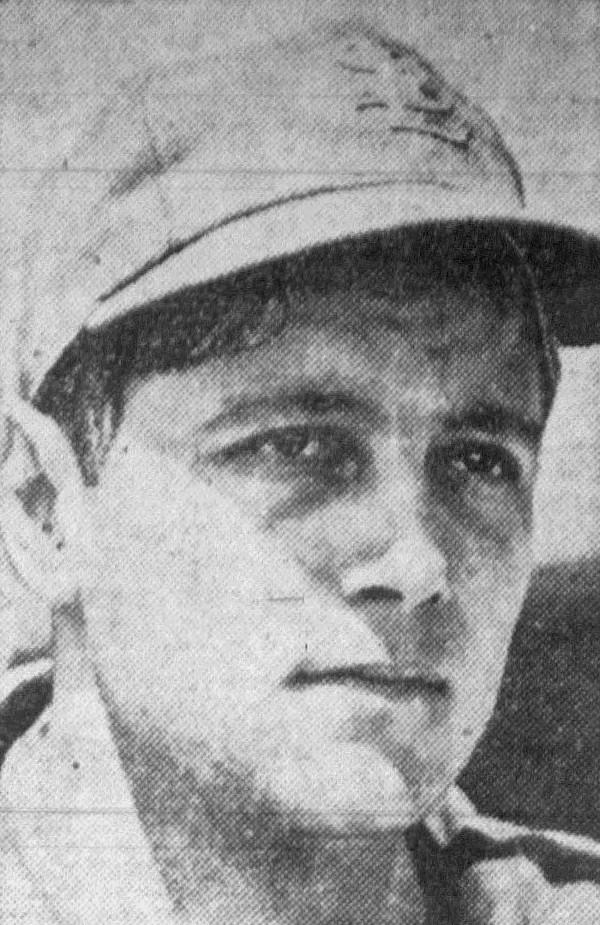
- Beazley, circa 1942
- Pitcher
- Born: May 25, 1918; Nashville, Tennessee, U.S.
- Died: April 21, 1990 (aged 71); Nashville, Tennessee, U.S.
- Batted: Right Threw: Right

MLB debut
- September 28, 1941, for the St. Louis Cardinals

Last MLB appearance
- May 8, 1949, for the Boston Braves

MLB statistics
- Win–loss record: 31–12
- Earned run average: 3.01
- Strikeouts: 147
- Stats at Baseball Reference

Teams
- St. Louis Cardinals (1941–1942, 1946); Boston Braves (1947–1949)

Career highlights and awards
- 2× World Series champion (1942, 1946)

John Andrew Beazley (May 25, 1918 – April 21, 1990) was an American right-handed pitcher in Major League Baseball who played for the St. Louis Cardinals and Boston Braves.

As a rookie in 1942, Beazley went 21–6 with a 2.13 ERA for the Cardinals, as his 21 wins and ERA ranked him second in the National League behind teammate Mort Cooper (22 and 1.78). Beazley completed his feat pitching two complete-game wins in the team's World Series victory over the New York Yankees in five games, allowing three runs in Game Two and two runs in Game Five for a combined 2.50 ERA.

After the season, Beazley enlisted in the United States Army during World War II. While serving, he was sent to pitch for an Army team and felt pain in his arm, but ordered by his commanding officer to pitch through the pain, Beazley severely hurt his arm. Coming out of the service in 1946, he tried in vain to regain his form but was never the same, winning only nine games for the rest of his career.

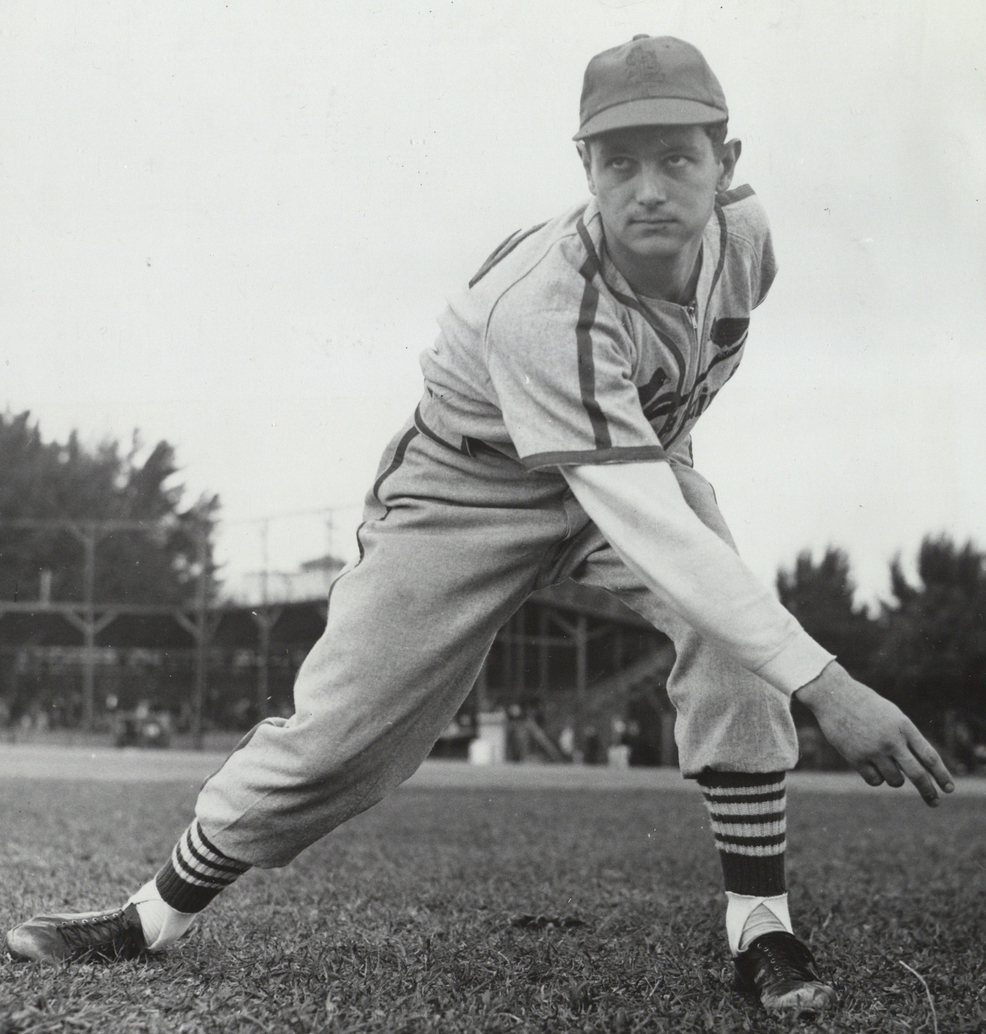
Johnny Beazley

In a six-season career, Beazley posted a 31–12 record with 147 strikeouts and a 3.01 ERA in 76 games, including three shutouts and 21 complete games in 374 innings pitched.

After leaving baseball, Beazley worked as a beer distributor. Beazley died at his home in Nashville, Tennessee on the morning of April 21, 1990 after a prolonged battle with cancer.
