= Jimmy Brown (baseball) =

American baseball player and coach (1910–1977)

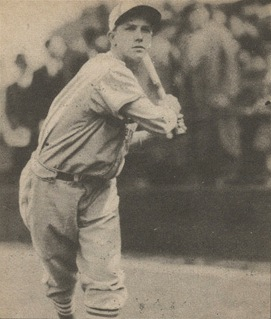
- Infielder
- Born: April 25, 1910; Jamesville, North Carolina, U.S.
- Died: December 29, 1977 (aged 67); Bath, North Carolina, U.S.
- Batted: Switch Threw: Right

MLB debut
- April 23, 1937, for the St. Louis Cardinals

Last MLB appearance
- September 15, 1946, for the Pittsburgh Pirates

MLB statistics
- Batting average: .279
- Home runs: 9
- Runs batted in: 319
- Stats at Baseball Reference

Teams
- St. Louis Cardinals (1937–1943); Pittsburgh Pirates (1946)

Career highlights and awards
- All-Star (1942); World Series champion (1942)

James Roberson Brown (April 25, 1910 – December 29, 1977) was an American Major League Baseball infielder and coach.

== Early life ==
Born in Jamesville, North Carolina, he played college baseball for the North Carolina State College (now North Carolina State University) Wolfpack. Brown was a switch-hitter who threw right-handed; he was listed as 5 feet 8 inches (1.73 m) tall and 165 pounds (75 kg).

== Career ==
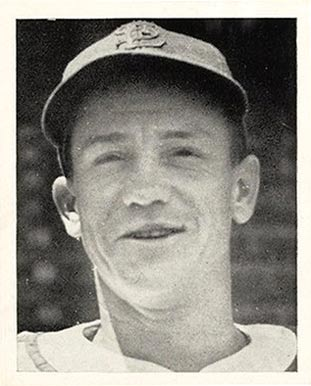
Brown in 1941

He signed with the St. Louis Cardinals afterwards and made his major league debut two days before his 27th birthday. He made an immediate impact, not only scoring 9 triples his rookie year, but also leading the league in sacrifice hits with 26. His 1938 season was not as impressive, but he did manage to increase his batting average over .300. Brown had a career year in 1939, not only leading the league in at-bats with 645, but finishing 6th in MVP voting. He began being known as a reliable leadoff hitter and as an infielder that the Cardinals could put anywhere, having played 1936 primarily as a second baseman, 1939 as a shortstop, and 1941 as a third baseman.

After a decent season in 1940, he came back with another great year in 1941, tying a career high in triples with 9, earning a career high batting average with .306, and finishing 4th in MVP voting. This, however, was still not enough to earn an all-star appearance. In 1942 he managed to earn his lone all-star appearance and finish 13th in MVP voting. Despite this and leading the league in at-bats with 606, his batting average dipped to .256, a career low. Despite this, during the 1942 World Series, he led all Cardinals' hitters in batting average with .300 en route to their World Series victory.

Brown enlisted in the United States Army Air Forces after playing 34 games during the 1943 season. When World War II ended, his contract was sold for $30,000 on January 5, 1946, to the Pittsburgh Pirates; he played the 1946 season as a utility infielder before being released by the Pirates on November 15.

In 890 games over eight seasons, Brown posted a .279 batting average (980-for-3512) with 465 runs, 146 doubles, 42 triples, 9 home runs, 319 RBI and 231 bases on balls. He finished his career with a .959 fielding percentage playing at second and third base and shortstop. In the 1942 World Series, he hit .300 (6-for-20) with 2 runs, 1 RBI and 3 walks.

Upon retirement, he became a manager in the Pittsburgh farm system, with the Indianapolis Indians in 1947 and the New Orleans Pelicans in 1948. Brown then returned to the National League as a coach for the Boston Braves, working for three seasons (1949–51) under his old Cardinal skipper, Billy Southworth.

== Later life ==
After leaving Boston in 1952, he was a manager for minor league teams in the farm systems of the Cardinals, Braves and Cincinnati Reds. He died December 29, 1977, in Bath, North Carolina, where he was a long-time resident.
