= Atherton, Missouri =

Unincorporated community in Missouri, U.S.

Coordinates: 39°11′10″N 94°18′20″W

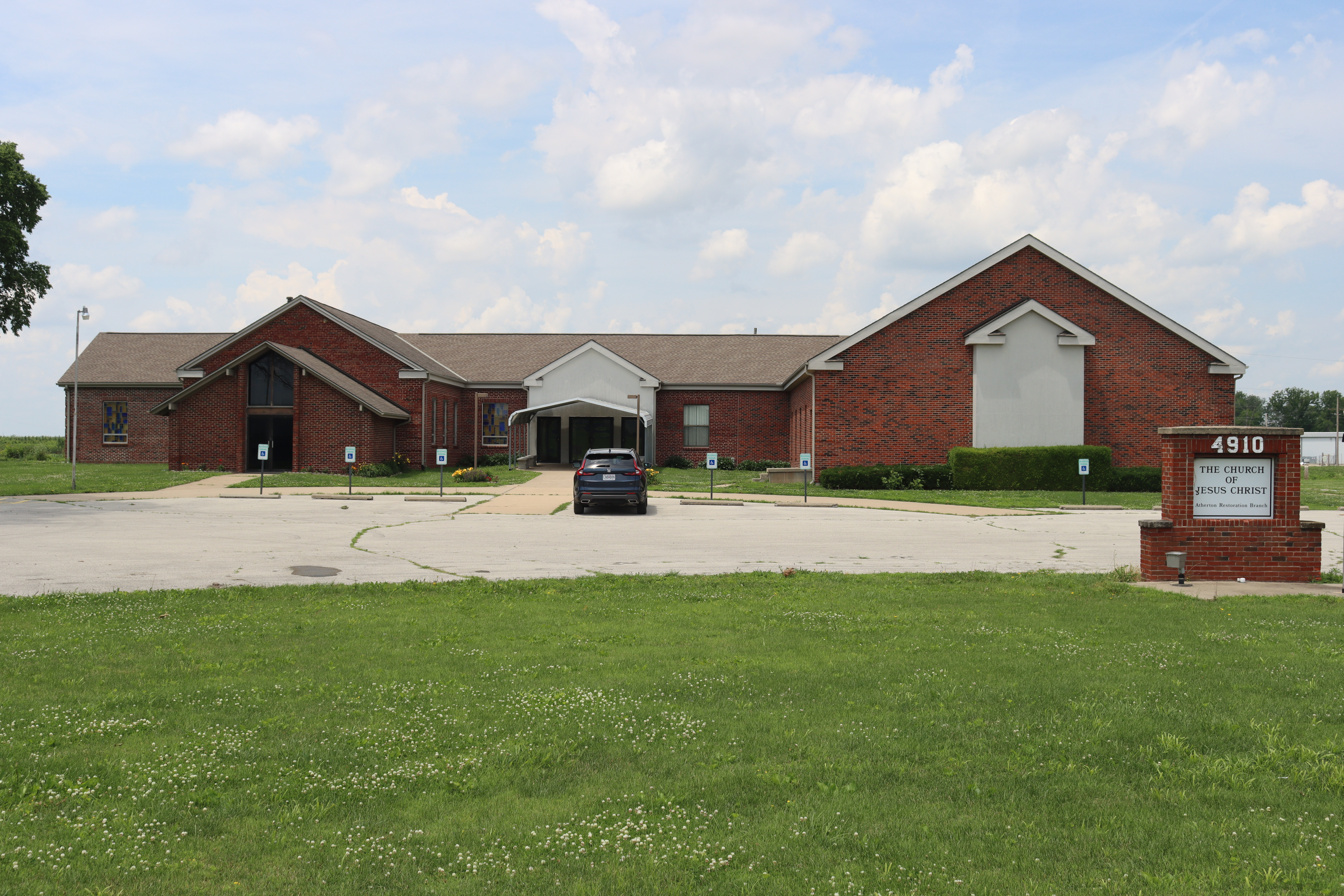
Atherton Restoration Branch

Atherton is an unincorporated community in Jackson County, in the U.S. state of Missouri.

== History ==
A post office called Atherton was established in 1888, and remained in operation until 1976. The community was named after a railroad employee.

In 1925, Atherton had 112 inhabitants.

== Notable people ==
Mort Cooper, a professional baseball pitcher, was born at Atherton in 1913. His younger brother Walker Cooper, a baseball catcher, was born at Atherton in 1915.
