= John Halla =

American baseball player (1884–1947)

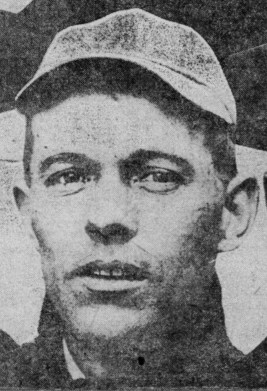
- Pitcher
- Born: May 13, 1884; St. Louis, Missouri, U.S.
- Died: September 30, 1947 (aged 63); El Segundo, California, U.S.
- Batted: Left Threw: Left

MLB debut
- August 18, 1905, for the Cleveland Naps

Last MLB appearance
- August 29, 1905, for the Cleveland Naps

MLB statistics
- Win–loss record: 0-0
- Earned run average: 2.84
- Strikeouts: 4
- Stats at Baseball Reference

Teams
- Cleveland Naps (1905)

John Arthur Halla (May 13, 1884 – September 30, 1947) was an American professional baseball pitcher from 1902 to 1917. He played one season in Major League Baseball for the Cleveland Naps. Halla was 5 feet, 11 inches tall and weighed 175 pounds.

== Career ==
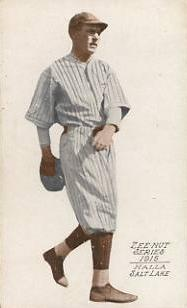
A baseball card depicting Halla

Halla was born in St. Louis, Missouri, in 1884. He started his professional baseball career in 1902 with the Jefferson City Convicts of the Missouri Valley League. In 1904, he had a win–loss record of 20-19 for the MVL's Pittsburg Coal Diggers. The following season, he went 15–11 in the Western Association and was sold to the Cleveland Naps in August.

Halla made three relief appearances for Cleveland, pitching 12.2 innings and giving up four earned runs. That was the only major league experience of his career. He began the 1906 season with the Ohio–Pennsylvania League's Sharon Steels but then joined the Western Association's Topeka White Sox after losing four of his first five decisions.

With Topeka, Halla went 10-3 for the rest of the season. In 1907, he stayed with the same club and went 24–9 to set a career-high in victories. He pitched a no-hitter on August 1 of that year.

Halla was then purchased by the American Association's Louisville Colonels and stayed with them for the next three seasons. In 1908, Halla had a win-loss record of 23-16 while pitching 336 innings, and in 1909, he went 17–12. However, he then went 10–23 in 1910 to lead the league in losses. He went to the Pacific Coast League for two seasons after that and posted two more losing records.

Halla bounced around various minor leagues until 1917. In his final season, he went 18-15 for the Western League's Lincoln Links. He finished his professional baseball career with 195 wins and 166 losses, all in the minors.

Halla died in El Segundo, California, in 1947 and was buried in Pacific Crest Cemetery.
