= 1942 World Series =

1942 Major League Baseball championship series

Team (Wins)	Managers	Season
St. Louis Cardinals (4)	Billy Southworth	106–48, .688, GA: 2
New York Yankees (1)	Joe McCarthy	103–51, .669, GA: 9
- Dates: September 30 – October 5
- Venue(s): Sportsman's Park (St. Louis); Yankee Stadium (New York)
- Umpires: George Magerkurth (NL), Bill Summers (AL), George Barr (NL), Cal Hubbard (AL)
- Hall of Famers: Umpire: Cal Hubbard; Cardinals: Billy Southworth (mgr.); Enos Slaughter; Stan Musial; Yankees: Joe McCarthy (mgr.); Bill Dickey; Joe DiMaggio; Joe Gordon; Phil Rizzuto; Red Ruffing

Broadcast
- Radio: Mutual
- Radio announcers: Red Barber and Mel Allen

The 1942 World Series was the championship series in Major League Baseball for the 1942 season. The 39th edition of the World Series, it featured the defending champion New York Yankees against the St. Louis Cardinals, with the Cardinals winning in five games for their first championship since 1934 and their fourth overall.

The 1942 Cardinals set a franchise record for victories with 106. Every Cardinals player, except for Harry Gumbert, was a product of the team's farm system, which had been created by Branch Rickey.

The Yankees won Game 1 despite a Cardinals rally, but the Cardinals swept the rest of the games. The loss was the Yankees' first since the 1926 World Series, also at the hands of the Cardinals. The Yankees had won eight World Series in the interim (a record for most consecutive series won between losses) and had won 32 out of 36 World Series games in that period, including five sweeps (1927 vs. the Pirates, 1928 vs. the Cardinals, 1932 and 1938 vs. the Cubs and 1939 vs. the Reds).

== Summary ==
NL St. Louis Cardinals (4) vs. AL New York Yankees (1)

Game	Date	Score	Location	Time	Attendance
1	September 30	New York Yankees – 7, St. Louis Cardinals – 4	Sportsman's Park	2:35	34,769
2	October 1	New York Yankees – 3, St. Louis Cardinals – 4	Sportsman's Park	1:57	34,255
3	October 3	St. Louis Cardinals – 2, New York Yankees – 0	Yankee Stadium	2:30	69,123
4	October 4	St. Louis Cardinals – 9, New York Yankees – 6	Yankee Stadium	2:28	69,902
5	October 5	St. Louis Cardinals – 4, New York Yankees – 2	Yankee Stadium	1:58	69,052

== Matchups ==
=== Game 1 ===
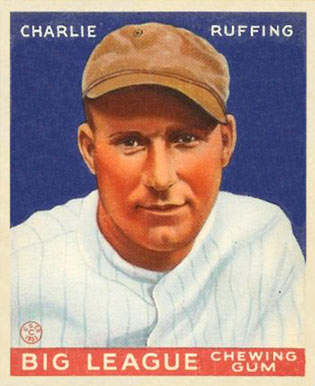
Red Ruffing

Wednesday, September 30, 1942 1:30 pm (CT) at Sportsman's Park in St. Louis, Missouri
Team	1	2	3	4	5	6	7	8	9	R	H	E
New York	0	0	0	1	1	0	0	3	2	7	11	0
St. Louis	0	0	0	0	0	0	0	0	4	4	7	4
WP: Red Ruffing (1–0) LP: Mort Cooper (0–1) Sv: Spud Chandler (1)

In Game 1, Red Ruffing had a no-hitter until Terry Moore singled for St. Louis with two out in the eighth inning. The Yankees scored the game's first run in the fourth on Buddy Hassett's two-out double with two on off Mort Cooper. Next inning with runners on second and third, Joe DiMaggio's fielder's choice made it 2–0 Yankees. In the eighth with two on, Hassett's single scored a run, then an error on Red Ruffing's fly ball scored two more. Red Rolfe singled to lead off the ninth off Max Lanier and scored on an error on Roy Cullenbine's bunt attempt. Charlie Keller walked and an error on a pickoff attempt allowed Cullenbine to score. In the bottom of the ninth, with two on and two outs, Marty Marion put the Cardinals on the board with a two-run triple, then scored on Ken O'Dea's single. After Jimmy Brown walked, Spud Chandler relieved Ruffing and allowed an RBI single to Terry Moore. Another single loaded the bases, bringing Stan Musial to the plate as the potential winning run, only to have Musial ground out to end the game as the Yankees took a 1–0 series lead with a 7–4 win.

=== Game 2 ===
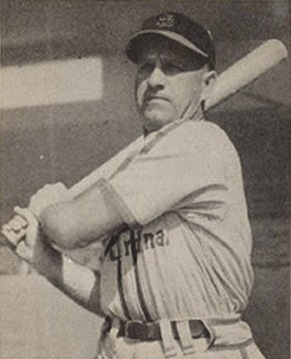
Enos Slaughter

Thursday, October 1, 1942 1:30 pm (CT) at Sportsman's Park in St. Louis, Missouri
Team	1	2	3	4	5	6	7	8	9	R	H	E
New York	0	0	0	0	0	0	0	3	0	3	10	2
St. Louis	2	0	0	0	0	0	1	1	X	4	6	0
WP: Johnny Beazley (1–0) LP: Tiny Bonham (0–1); Home runs: NYY: Charlie Keller (1); STL: None

In Game 2, Walker Cooper's two-run double in the first, the Cardinals' first hit of the game, put them up 2–0 off Tiny Bonham. In the seventh, innings Johnny Hopp singled and scored on Whitey Kurowski's triple to make it 3–0 Cardinals. Johnny Beazley pitched seven shutout innings, but in the eighth allowed a two-out single to Roy Cullenbine, who stole second and scored on Joe DiMaggio's single. A two-run home run by Charlie Keller then tied the score, but the Cardinals regained the lead in the bottom half when Enos Slaughter doubled with two outs and scored on Stan Musial's single. Slaughter threw out Tuck Stainback going from first to third on a single with no outs in the ninth. Beazley then retired the next two hitters to end the game as the Cardinals tied the series with a 4–3 win heading to New York.

=== Game 3 ===
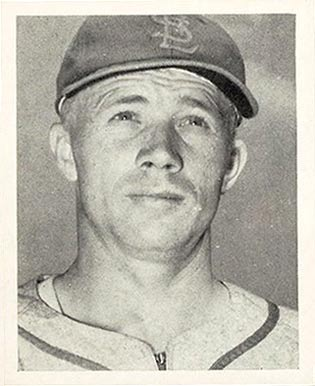
Ernie White

Saturday, October 3, 1942 1:30 pm (ET) at Yankee Stadium in Bronx, New York
Team	1	2	3	4	5	6	7	8	9	R	H	E
St. Louis	0	0	1	0	0	0	0	0	1	2	5	1
New York	0	0	0	0	0	0	0	0	0	0	6	1
WP: Ernie White (1–0) LP: Spud Chandler (0–1)

Ernie White pitched a six-hit shutout against New York, walking none. The last time the Yankees were shutout in a World Series game was by Jesse Haines in 1926. The Cardinals scored the game's first run in the third off Spud Chandler on Jimmy Brown's groundout with runners on second and third, then added an insurance run in the ninth off Marv Breuer on Enos Slaughter's RBI single with two on, the run unearned due to catcher Bill Dickey's error on Terry Moore's bunt attempt, to take a 2–1 series lead.

=== Game 4 ===
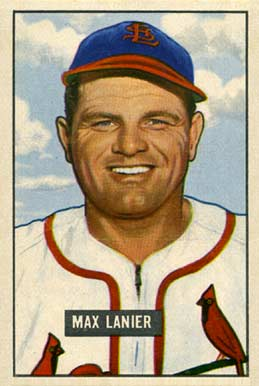
Max Lanier

Sunday, October 4, 1942 2:00 pm (ET) at Yankee Stadium in Bronx, New York
Team	1	2	3	4	5	6	7	8	9	R	H	E
St. Louis	0	0	0	6	0	0	2	0	1	9	12	1
New York	1	0	0	0	0	5	0	0	0	6	10	1
WP: Max Lanier (1–0) LP: Atley Donald (0–1); Home runs: STL: None; NYY: Charlie Keller (2)

In Game 4, the Yankees struck first in the bottom of the first when Red Rolfe doubled off Mort Cooper and scored on Roy Cullenbine's single. In the top of the fourth, the Cardinals loaded the bases with no outs on two singles and walk before Whitey Kurowski's two-run single put them up 2–1. A walk loaded the bases before Cooper's two-run single made it 4–1 Cardinals. Atley Donald relieved starter Hank Borowy and allowed a one-out RBI single to Terry Moore and two-out RBI double to Stan Musial. In the bottom of the sixth, after a leadoff single and walk, Cullunbine's RBI single made it 6–2 Cardinals and one out later, Charlie Keller's three-run home run cut their lead to one. Harry Gumbert relieved Cooper and Joe Gordon reached first third baseman Kurowski's throwing error, then scored on Jerry Priddy's double to tie the game, but the Cardinals took the lead for good in the seventh. After two leadoff walks, an RBI single by Walker Cooper put them up 7–6, and Marty Marion hit a sacrifice fly off Tiny Bonham later that inning. The Cardinals added another run in the ninth Johnny Hopp hit a leadoff single, moved to third on two groundouts and scored on a single by Max Lanier, who pitched three shutout innings to close the game and earn the win, leaving the Cardinals one win away from the championship.

=== Game 5 ===
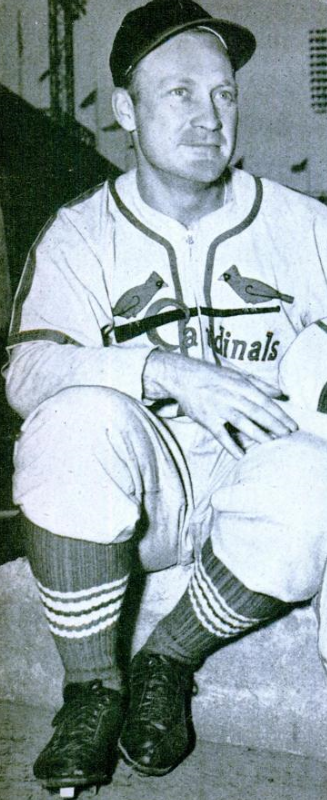
Whitey Kurowski

Monday, October 5, 1942 1:30 pm (ET) at Yankee Stadium in Bronx, New York
Team	1	2	3	4	5	6	7	8	9	R	H	E
St. Louis	0	0	0	1	0	1	0	0	2	4	9	4
New York	1	0	0	1	0	0	0	0	0	2	7	1
WP: Johnny Beazley (2–0) LP: Red Ruffing (1–1); Home runs: STL: Enos Slaughter (1), Whitey Kurowski (1); NYY: Phil Rizzuto (1)

In Game 5, Phil Rizzuto's leadoff home run in the bottom of the first off Johnny Beazley put the Yankees up 1–0, but the Cardinals tied the score in the fourth on Enos Slaughter's leadoff home run off Red Ruffing. The Yankees retook the lead in the bottom half when Red Rolfe hit a leadoff single, moved to third on an error and groundout and scored on Joe DiMaggio's single, but the Cardinals again tied the game in the sixth on two leadoff singles and a sacrifice fly by Walker Cooper. In the top of the ninth, Whitey Kurowski's two-run home run put the Cardinals up 4–2. Though the Yankees put two on in the bottom of the ninth on a single and error with no outs, Beazley picked off Joe Gordon at second and retired the next two batters to end the game and give the Cardinals the championship.

== Composite box ==
1942 World Series (4–1): St. Louis Cardinals (N.L.) over New York Yankees (A.L.)

Team	1	2	3	4	5	6	7	8	9	R	H	E
St. Louis Cardinals	2	0	1	7	0	1	3	1	8	23	39	10
New York Yankees	2	0	0	2	1	5	0	6	2	18	44	5
Total attendance: 277,101 Average attendance: 55,420; Winning player's share: $6,193 Losing player's share: $3,352

== 1942 World Series in literature ==
- This World Series was used as a background for the plot endings in Philip Roth's 2004 novel The Plot Against America.

== See also ==
- 1942 Negro World Series
