= Walker Cooper =

American baseball player and manager (1915–1991)

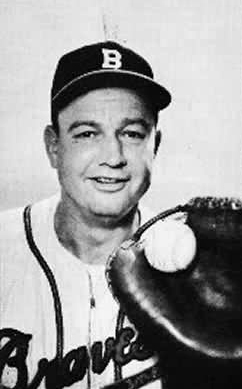
- Catcher
- Born: January 8, 1915; Atherton, Missouri, U.S.
- Died: April 11, 1991 (aged 76); Scottsdale, Arizona, U.S.
- Batted: Right Threw: Right

MLB debut
- September 25, 1940, for the St. Louis Cardinals

Last MLB appearance
- September 20, 1957, for the St. Louis Cardinals

MLB statistics
- Batting average: .285
- Home runs: 173
- Runs batted in: 812
- Stats at Baseball Reference

Teams
- St. Louis Cardinals (1940–1945); New York Giants (1946–1949); Cincinnati Reds (1949–1950); Boston / Milwaukee Braves (1950–1953); Pittsburgh Pirates (1954); Chicago Cubs (1954–1955); St. Louis Cardinals (1956–1957)

Career highlights and awards
- 8× All-Star (1942–1944, 1946–1950); 2× World Series champion (1942, 1944)

William Walker Cooper (January 8, 1915 – April 11, 1991) was an American professional baseball catcher and manager. He played in Major League Baseball as a catcher from 1940 to 1957, most notably as a member of the St. Louis Cardinals with whom he won two World Series championships. An eight-time All-Star, Cooper was known as one of the top catchers in baseball during the 1940s and early 1950s. His elder brother Mort Cooper, also played in Major League Baseball as a pitcher.

== Professional career ==
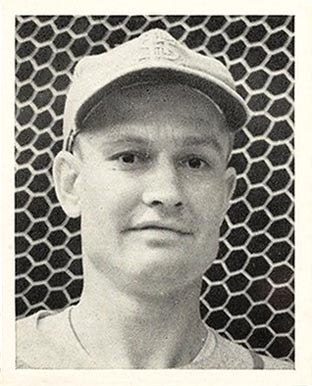
Cooper with the Cardinals

A native of Atherton, Missouri, Cooper was a solid defensive catcher as well as a strong hitter, making the National League All-Star team every year from 1942 to 1950. After being stuck in the Cardinals' talent-rich farm system in the late 1930s, he finally broke in with the team in late 1940 at age 25 (and reportedly complained to umpire Beans Reardon about the first pitch he saw); but a broken collarbone limited his play to 68 games in 1941. On August 30 of that year, Cooper caught Lon Warneke's no-hitter. In 1942 he batted .281, finishing among the National League's top ten players in slugging, doubles and triples as St. Louis won the pennant by two games; brother Mort won the Most Valuable Player Award. Batting fifth, he hit .286 in the World Series against the defending champion New York Yankees, driving in the winning run in Game 4 and scoring the winning run on Whitey Kurowski's home run in the ninth inning of the final Game 5; he then picked Joe Gordon off second base with no outs in the bottom of the ninth inning, as the team earned its first title in eight years.

In 1943, Cooper raised his average to a career-high .318, and was third in the National League in batting and slugging and fifth in RBI, as the Cardinals repeated as league champions; he was runner-up in the Most Valuable Player Award vote to teammate Stan Musial. In the 1943 World Series he batted .294 as the clean-up hitter, but St. Louis lost the rematch with the Yankees. In 1944, Cooper's average dipped only slightly to .317 as the Cardinals won their third straight pennant, facing the crosstown St. Louis Browns in the World Series; again batting cleanup, he hit .318 in the Series and scored the team's first run in the final Game 6, and the Cardinals won another title. World War II service in the Navy led him to appear in only four games in 1945, and before his return, the New York Giants purchased his contract following a salary dispute in January 1946; the sale by the Cardinals for $175,000 ($2,889,292 today) was the highest cash-only deal ever to that time; the transactions of Joe Cronin in 1934 and Dizzy Dean in 1938 were larger deals, but also involved other players.

Cooper enjoyed his most productive season at the plate in 1947, when he hit .305 and compiled career highs in home runs (35), RBI (122), runs (79), hits (157) triples (8) and games (140); the Giants set a new major league record with 221 home runs. In that season, Cooper homered in six consecutive games to tie a record set by George Kelly in 1924. After Leo Durocher became Giants manager in 1948, he began revamping the team to emphasize speed, and Cooper was traded to the Cincinnati Reds on June 13, 1949 for fellow catcher Ray Mueller after starting the year hitting .211. Three weeks later, on July 6, Cooper became the only catcher in major league history, and one of only eleven players, to have hit 10 or more RBI in a single game; he was 6-for-7, including three home runs and five runs. That year, he also led National League catchers in assists for the only time in his career.

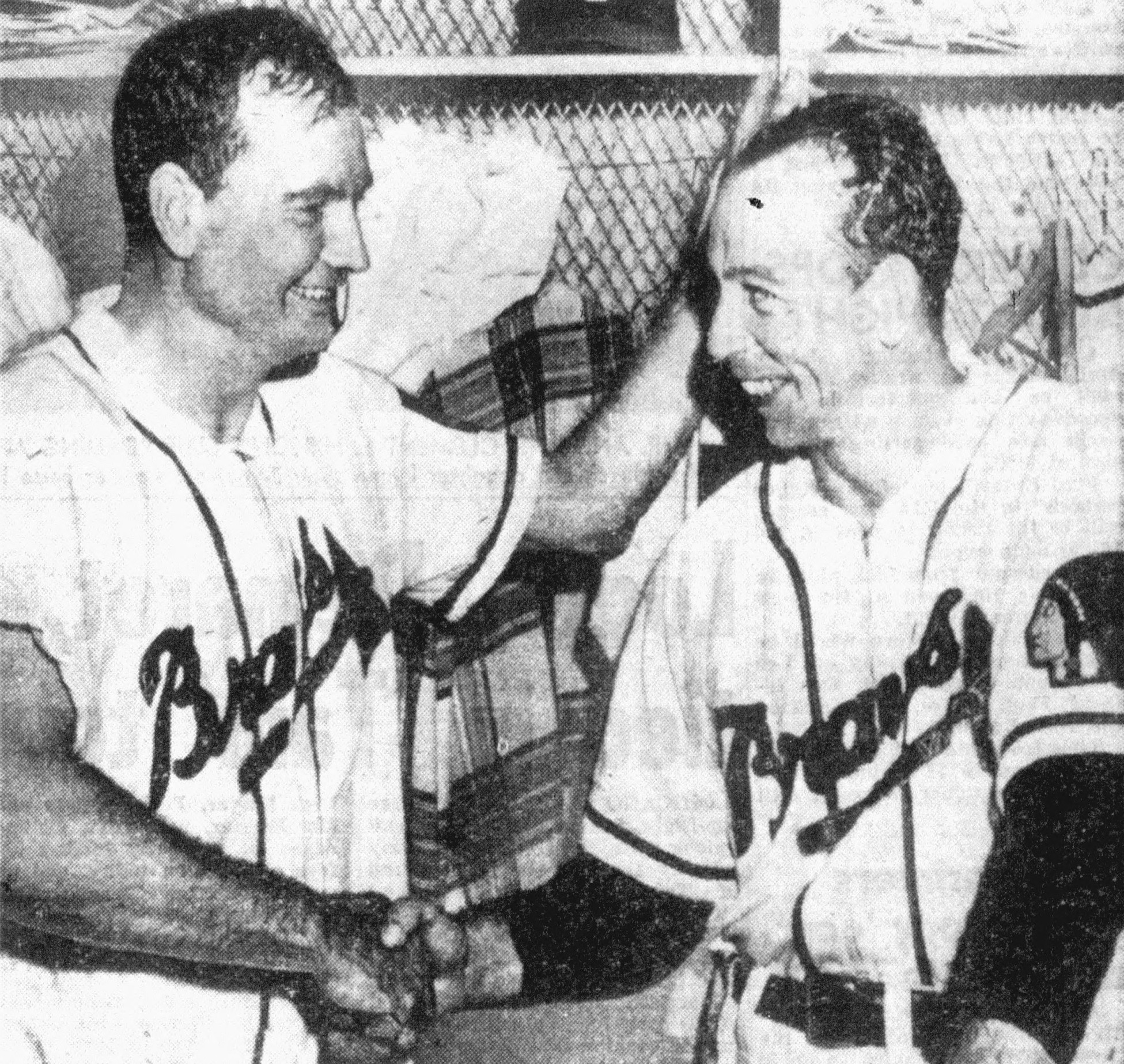
Cooper (left) congratulates his battery mate Vern Bickford following his no-hitter in 1950

In May 1950 he was traded to the Boston Braves, where he caught Vern Bickford's no-hitter on August 11 of that year. He remained with the Braves through their 1953 move to Milwaukee, batting over .300 in his first two seasons with the club. Cooper holds the distinction of being the last man to come to bat at Boston's Braves Field, flying out to Brooklyn's Andy Pafko.

Cooper signed with the Pittsburgh Pirates before the 1954 season, but was let go in May after hitting only .200; he was picked up by the Chicago Cubs, and hit well as a backup catcher and pinch-hitter through 1955. He then returned to St. Louis to spend his last two seasons as a Cardinal, ending his career in October 1957. After his daughter, Sara (Miss Missouri 1957), married Cardinals second baseman Don Blasingame, he noted, "You know you are getting too old when your daughter marries one of your teammates."

== Career statistics ==
In an eighteen-year major league career, Cooper played in 1,473 games, accumulating 1,341 hits in 4,702 at bats for a .285 career batting average along with 173 home runs, 812 runs batted in, and a .464 slugging percentage. He led National League catchers three times in range factor, twice in caught stealing percentage, and once in assists, finishing with a .977 career fielding percentage. One of the sport's strongest players in his prime, at the end of his career he ranked among the top five National League catchers in career batting average (.285), slugging average (.464), home runs (173) and runs batted in (812). He also batted .300 over three World Series with the St. Louis Cardinals from 1942 to 1944 as the team won two championships, and ranked tenth in National League history in both games (1,223) and putouts (5,166) behind the plate when he retired. During his career, he set a record by hitting grand slams with five different teams (a mark subsequently tied by Dave Kingman and Dave Winfield). His .464 slugging average then placed him behind only Roy Campanella (.500) and Gabby Hartnett (.489) among players with 1,000 National League games as a catcher, and his 173 HRs and 812 RBI put him behind only Campanella (242, 856), Hartnett (236, 1,179), and Ernie Lombardi (190, 990). His elder brother, Mort Cooper, was a National League pitcher and his teammate for the first few years of his career, while his son-in-law, Don Blasingame, also was a major leaguer.

== Managing career ==
After his playing career, he managed the Indianapolis Indians (1958–59) and Dallas-Fort Worth Rangers (1961) of the Triple-A American Association and was a coach for the 1960 Kansas City Athletics, before leaving the game.

Walker Cooper died of a respiratory illness in Scottsdale, Arizona on April 11, 1991 at age 76.

== See also ==
- List of St. Louis Cardinals coaches
- List of Major League Baseball single-game hits leaders
