= Eugene Scott (baseball) =

American baseball player

- Catcher
- Born: August 31, 1889; Shreveport, Louisiana, U.S.
- Died: June 12, 1947 (aged 57); Detroit, Michigan, U.S.
- Threw: Right

debut
- 1917, for the Texas All Stars

Last appearance
- 1920, for the Detroit Stars

Teams
- Texas All Stars (1917); Lincoln Giants (1920); Detroit Stars (1920)

Eugene Scott (born August 31, 1889) was an American Negro leagues catcher for several years before the founding of the first Negro National League.
