= Dan Barry (umpire) =

American baseball umpire (1886-1947)

- Born: Daniel Augustine Barry; August 29, 1886; Boston, Massachusetts, U.S.
- Died: February 9, 1947 (aged 60); Boston, Massachusetts, U.S.
- Occupation: Umpire
- Years active: 1928
- Employer: American League

Daniel Augustine Barry (August 29, 1886 - February 9, 1947) was an American professional baseball umpire. Barry umpired 132 American League games in 1928, 49 of them as the home plate umpire.

== Early life and career ==
Born in Boston, Barry played high school baseball followed by semipro and minor league baseball. After an arm injury, he began a newspaper career with the sports department at The Boston Post. Having spent fifteen years as a college baseball umpire, particularly for Harvard and Holy Cross games, Barry was one of few umpires who would be promoted to MLB umpiring without ever officiating in the minor leagues.

== MLB career ==
Barry was promoted to the umpiring staff of the American League for the 1928 season, the first Boston man to hold that distinction. Umpire George Moriarity took a leave of absence to manage the Detroit Tigers that year and he came back to umpiring for 1929. Barry returned to newspaper work.

In his lone major league season, Barry recorded only two ejections. His first was Lou Gehrig, one of six times that the Hall of Famer was ejected in his career. Later in the season, Barry handed Lena Blackburne his only ejection as a manager in 232 career games.

== Later life ==
Barry maintained an interest in umpiring, but shifted his focus to youth baseball. He worked in several Little World Series after his stint in the major leagues.
