= Mort Cooper =

American baseball player (1913–1958)

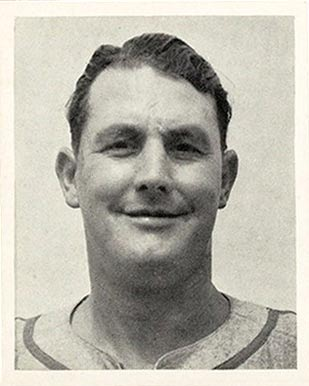
- Pitcher
- Born: March 2, 1913; Atherton, Missouri, U.S.
- Died: November 17, 1958 (aged 45); Little Rock, Arkansas, U.S.
- Batted: Right Threw: Right

MLB debut
- September 14, 1938, for the St. Louis Cardinals

Last MLB appearance
- May 7, 1949, for the Chicago Cubs

MLB statistics
- Win–loss record: 128–75
- Earned run average: 2.97
- Strikeouts: 913
- Stats at Baseball Reference

Teams
- St. Louis Cardinals (1938–1945); Boston Braves (1945–1947); New York Giants (1947); Chicago Cubs (1949)

Career highlights and awards
- 4× All-Star (1942, 1943, 1945, 1946); 2× World Series champion (1942, 1944); NL MVP (1942); 2× NL wins leader (1942, 1943); NL ERA leader (1942); St. Louis Cardinals Hall of Fame

Morton Cecil Cooper (March 2, 1913 – November 17, 1958) was an American professional baseball pitcher. He played 11 seasons in Major League Baseball (MLB) for the St. Louis Cardinals, Boston Braves, New York Giants, and Chicago Cubs. A four-time MLB All-Star, Cooper won the National League (NL) Most Valuable Player (MVP) Award in 1942. His younger brother, Walker Cooper, also played in the major leagues.

== Early life ==
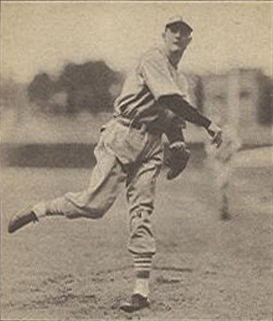
Cooper in 1940

Cooper was born on March 2, 1913, in Atherton, Missouri to Robert J. and Verna Cooper. He had four brothers and one sister. Cooper and his younger brother Walker, with whom he would come to play Major League Baseball on the St. Louis Cardinals, were raised playing baseball by their father, Robert J. Cooper, a rural mail carrier. Cooper attended William Chrisman High School in Independence, Missouri. At age 17, Cooper joined a closely scouted amateur league baseball team, the Ripley Merchants.

== Professional career ==
Cooper was a pitcher who could throw a fastball, screwball, forkball or curveball. He pitched in six Minor League Baseball seasons and 11 MLB seasons. From 1940 to 1945, he pitched for the St. Louis Cardinals with his brother Walker as his catcher.

=== Minor leagues ===
Cooper was signed by the Class A Des Moines Demons of the Western League in 1933. That same year he played for the Western League's Wichita/Muskogee Oilers. He was signed by the St. Louis Cardinals that same season, and assigned to its Western League affiliate, the Springfield Cardinals.

In 1934, the St. Louis Cardinals assigned Cooper to the Class A Elmira Red Wings of the New York-Pennsylvania League. He pitched in 29 games, going 185 innings pitched, with a 10–12 win–loss record and 4.43 earned run average (ERA). He also pitched briefly for the Double-A Columbus Red Birds. In 1935, he played the full season with the Red Birds, going 6–7, with a 3.65 ERA in 101 innings pitched. At Columbus again in 1936, he was 5–7, with a 4.76 ERA in only 85 innings pitched. Still with Columbus in 1937, he was 13–13, with a 4.10 ERA in 178 innings pitched and 147 strikeouts.

In 1938, Cooper was 13–10, with a 2.32 ERA for the Houston Buffaloes. Cooper led the Class A-1 Texas League in strikeouts, with 201 in 202 innings pitched. His Houston teammates included his brother Walker, a backup catcher, and future Cardinal teammates, pitchers Harry Brecheen and Ted Wilks. Cooper was called up the by Cardinals in September 1938.

=== Major leagues ===
==== St. Louis Cardinals ====
Cooper debuted with the Cardinals on September 14, 1938. He threw a complete game three-hitter, winning 3–2 over the Philadelphia Phillies. Overall in 1938, he started three of the four games in which he pitched, with a 2–1 record, one save and a 3.04 ERA. In his 1939 rookie season, Cooper was 12–6 with five saves, starting 26 of the 45 games in which he appeared. He had a 3.25 ERA in 210.2 innings pitched. In 1940, he was 11–12, with a 3.63 ERA in 230.2 innings pitched. Cooper had arm surgery in 1941 that kept him from playing between June 17 and July 27. It has been reported this was shoulder surgery. Still, he pitched 186.2 innings that year, with a 13–9 record and 3.91 ERA.

From 1942 to 1944 the Cardinals went to the World Series, winning in both 1942 (over the New York Yankees) and 1944 (over the St. Louis Browns), while losing to the Yankees in 1943. Cooper's three best winning seasons came during this three year stretch, when he was arguably the best pitcher in Major League Baseball. During each of these seasons, Walker Cooper was his catcher and was an All-Star each of those years.

In 1942, Cooper led all Major League pitchers with 22 wins (tied with Tex Hughson), 10 shutouts and an 8.2 WAR (wins above replacement) for pitchers. He led all National League pitchers with a 1.78 ERA. He gave up only nine home runs in 278.2 innings pitched, and pitched 22 complete games. From June 7 to June 25, he pitched four shoutouts and a one-run game over five consecutive starts. He earned NL Most Valuable Player honors, and was named to the NL All-Star team (but was the losing pitcher in that game). He started two games in the 1942 World Series, and was 0–1 with a 5.54 ERA.

In 1943, Cooper was 21–8, with a 2.30 ERA, 24 complete games and six shutouts in 274 innings pitched. He was again an All-Star, and was fifth in NL Most Valuable Player voting. He started the All-Star game, pitching four innings, but was again the losing pitcher. His future Hall of Fame teammate Stan Musial won the NL Most Valuable Player award, and his brother Walker was second in the MVP voting. He tied for the MLB lead in wins (21), and led the NL in WAR for pitchers (5.7).

During the 1943 season, Cooper pitched consecutive one-hit shutouts, on May 31 and June 4. In the first one-hitter, against the Brooklyn Dodgers, Billy Herman hit a double that landed just inside the left field foul line. In the second one-hitter against the Philadelphia Phillies, Jimmy Wasdell hit a single in the eighth inning. He was the only baserunner in what would have otherwise been a perfect game. The Cardinals lost to the Yankees in the World Series that year, with Cooper winning the only game for the Cardinals in the series, going 1–1 overall with a 2.81 ERA.

The Coopers' father, Robert Cooper, died of a heart attack the morning of October 6, 1943 at his home in Independence. Mort and Walker were in New York where the Cardinals were playing in the World Series against the New York Yankees. Mort and Walker played later that same day, as they believed that is what their father would have wanted them to do. Cooper pitched a complete game six-hitter, winning 4–3.

In 1944, he was 22–7, with a 2.46 ERA and 22 complete games in 252.1 innings pitched. He tied for the Major League lead among all pitchers with seven shutouts. He finished ninth in NL Most Valuable Player voting. He went 1–1 in the World Series against the St. Louis Browns, with a 1.13 ERA. He lost the opening game, giving up only two runs in seven innings, but the Cardinals only scored one run against Browns' pitcher Denny Galehouse.

Cooper came back and beat Galehouse in Game 5, throwing a complete game shutout in the Cardinals' 2–0 victory. The Game 5 home plate umpire, John "Ziggy" Sears, called it the "'greatest pitching duel'" he had seen in his 35 years of baseball. He said "'Cooper had perfect control of his assortment–a fork ball a screw ball and a fast ball. Galehouse was brilliant in his effort too'".

==== Boston Braves, New York Giants, Chicago Cubs ====
Cooper's career declined after 1944. At the start of the 1945 season, both Mort and Walker staged contract holdouts, demanding that the Cardinals raise their salaries to $15,000 each. Earlier, the Coopers had been told by the Cardinals and owner Sam Breadon the team had set a wage ceiling under the World War II Wage Stabilization Act (passed in October 1942). They agreed to limit their salaries accordingly. The Coopers later learned the team gave Marty Marion a raise exceeding the ceiling and were furious with the team, thinking they were misled; then demanding their own raises above the putative wage ceiling. In Mort's case, he was seeking either a $1,500 or $3,000 raise from his "capped" $12,000 salary.

Subsequently, Mort was traded in late May 1945 to the Boston Braves after only three starts for the Cardinals (with a 2–0 record and 1.52 ERA) for a lesser pitcher, Red Barrett, and $60,000. Walker spent the majority of the season in the U. S. Navy. After the season, his contract rights were sold for $175,000 to the New York Giants. Years later, Sam Breadon would take extraordinary steps to help Mort Cooper in difficult circumstances.

Bothered by bone chips in his elbow, Cooper pitched only 78 innings for the Braves, going 7–4, with a 3.35 ERA. He reached the point where he could pitch no more than three innings, and in August 1945 had his second arm surgery by the same St. Louis surgeon who had operated on him in 1941. Cooper did not pitch between August 16 and September 30. Years after Cooper's retirement one columnist wrote Cooper's arm problems originated from throwing the screwball to complement his fastball, rather than relying on a curveball, claiming that Cooper admitted he never developed a good curveball.

In 1946 with the Braves, Cooper was 13–11 in 199 innings pitched, with 3.12 ERA and 15 complete games. He did lead the NL in allowing 16 home runs. He was selected to the NL All-Star team for the third and final time. Ironically, his season ending four-hit complete game shutout victory over the Brooklyn Dodgers created the opportunity for the Cardinals to go on to the World Series that year.

In 1947, Cooper was once again hampered by a bad arm. He began the 1947 season for the Braves with a 2–5 record, and was traded to the New York Giants in June for Bill Voiselle and cash. The Giants had a narrow first place lead in the National League at the time. In joining the Giants, he also rejoined his brother Walker, who was the Giants starting catcher. He was 1–5 for the Giants over the rest of the season; pitching only 36.2 innings in eight starting appearances.

Cooper requested voluntary retirement before the 1948 season began. He changed his mind in early June and attempted a comeback, but was unsuccessful. The Giants eventually released Cooper in July 1948, after not pitching all year due to arm trouble which did not respond to treatment. Cooper paid for another arm surgery, at his own expense, and attempted a comeback in 1949 with the Chicago Cubs. Former Cards owner Sam Breadon had convinced the Cubs to give Cooper a chance after Cooper worked to get himself into shape, for which Cooper was appreciative, even after their falling out years earlier. However, Cooper's career ended with a single 1949 relief appearance for the Cubs in which he failed to record an out.

Cooper retired with a record of 128–75, a 2.97 ERA, 913 strikeouts, and 33 shutouts in 1,840 2/3 innings. He was selected to the NL All-Star team three times (1942–43; 1946). As a hitter, Cooper recorded a .194 batting average (127-for-654) with 50 runs, six home runs and 68 RBI.

== Legacy and honors ==
Along with Wes and Rick Ferrell, Mort and Walker Cooper are considered the best brother pitcher and catcher teammates (batteries) in the history of Major League Baseball. The Cooper brothers are also among the top sibling combinations in MLB history based on their combined WAR (wins above replacement). Cooper gained induction into the St. Louis Cardinals Hall of Fame and Museum on April 25, 2019.

== Personal life and death ==
In addition to Walker Cooper playing professional baseball, Cooper's youngest brother (by 13 years), Sam Cooper, played six years of Minor League Baseball.

Cooper was married to Bernadine, who filed for divorce in 1945. Together, they had one son, Lonnie. In October 1948, Cooper was alleged to have passed three bad checks, totaling less than $200. He said he believed he was going to get a new baseball contract and would have money to cover the checks. Former Cardinals owner Sam Breadon posted bond for Cooper, and then covered the checks and charges were dismissed.

Cooper lived in Houston for several years in the 1950s. He developed cirrhosis and a staphylococcal infection. He was hospitalized at St. Vincent's Infirmary in Little Rock, Arkansas, for about three weeks before he died. Cooper was buried in Independence. He was survived by his wife Viola Dee Cooper, and son Lonnie Morton Cooper.

== See also ==
- List of St. Louis Cardinals team records
- List of Major League Baseball annual ERA leaders
- List of Major League Baseball annual wins leaders
