= Knothole Gang =

Knothole Gang logo for the Billings Mustangs

In minor league baseball promotion, the Knothole Gang is a special ticket package for children (usually no more than 12–14 years of age) sold in an effort to bring more families out to games.

An example of teams using the promotion:

- Billings Mustangs – $12 38-game season pass
- Jupiter Hammerheads – $15 free admittance to Tuesday games
- Rochester Red Wings – $3 ticket on selected games
- Palm Beach Cardinals – $15 free admittance to Tuesday games
- Syracuse Chiefs – $15 Sunday game activities
- Wichita Wranglers – $10 10-game pass
- St. Lucie Mets – $18 free admittance to Friday and Sunday games

In addition to game admission, souvenir T-shirts, meet-the-players autograph days, and free or discount merchandise may also be included in the membership.

== History ==
Knothole gangs came about as professional ballparks were first being built with wooden fences which could develop holes when knots in the wood popped out. Children unable to buy tickets found themselves able to watch the games for free through knotholes, and would congregate around these holes during games.

In the late 1880s (perhaps 1889) – New Orleans Pelicans owner Abner Powell promoted the first knot hole gang when he allowed kids to watch free if they showed good behavior.

Historically, the St. Louis Cardinals are recognized as sponsoring the first "Knothole Gang club". A quote, from Baseball Though a Knothole – A St. Louis History by Bill Borst, pages 38 – 39, tells the story. "William Edward Bilheimer, a St. Louis insurance man, introduced the idea of a 'Knothole Gang'. With each fifty dollars' worth of stock purchased [in the Cardinal franchise] went one bleacher seat that was opened up free of charge for the city's youth." The date was the beginning of the 1917 season. This came about as part of the plans when Mrs. Helen Britton sold the Cardinal's club to a "fan syndicate from the city's prominent businessmen that formed an army of stockholders", page 38. Executive Branch Rickey developed the idea.

Another good example of a knothole gang was the Columbus Redbirds of Columbus, Ohio. If kids decided that they wanted to sign up they would do so and if they got good grades, they would be admitted free into any home game with the exceptions of the playoffs and All-Star games.

The Brooklyn Dodgers gave over 2 million free passes to kids during the 1940s and '50s. A photo of youngsters lying on the pavement to grab a view from under the center field gate at Ebbets.

From 1962 to 1965, the Houston Colt .45s called their knot-hole gang the "Six Shooter Club".
