= 1949 Boston Braves season =

1949 Boston Braves
- League: National League
- Ballpark: Braves Field
- City: Boston, Massachusetts
- Record: 75–79 (.487)
- League place: 4th
- Owners: Louis R. Perini
- General managers: John J. Quinn
- Managers: Billy Southworth, Johnny Cooney
- Television: WNAC; WBZ-TV (Jim Britt, Tom Hussey, Bump Hadley)
- Radio: WHDH (Jim Britt, Tom Hussey, Leo Egan)

The 1949 Boston Braves season was the 79th season of the franchise.

== Offseason ==
- December 15, 1948: Mike McCormick and Nanny Fernandez were traded by the Braves to the Brooklyn Dodgers for Pete Reiser.

== Regular season ==
=== Season standings ===
National League
Team	W	L	Pct.	GB	Home	Road
Brooklyn Dodgers	97	57	.630	—	48‍–‍29	49‍–‍28
St. Louis Cardinals	96	58	.623	1	51‍–‍26	45‍–‍32
Philadelphia Phillies	81	73	.526	16	40‍–‍37	41‍–‍36
Boston Braves	75	79	.487	22	43‍–‍34	32‍–‍45
New York Giants	73	81	.474	24	43‍–‍34	30‍–‍47
Pittsburgh Pirates	71	83	.461	26	36‍–‍41	35‍–‍42
Cincinnati Reds	62	92	.403	35	35‍–‍42	27‍–‍50
Chicago Cubs	61	93	.396	36	33‍–‍44	28‍–‍49

=== Record vs. opponents ===
1949 National League record Sources:
Team	BSN	BRO	CHC	CIN	NYG	PHI	PIT	STL
Boston	—	10–12	12–10	12–10–1	12–10–2	11–11	12–10	6–16
Brooklyn	12–10	—	17–5	17–5	14–8	11–11	16–6	10–12–1
Chicago	10–12	5–17	—	9–13	12–10	6–16	11–11	8–14
Cincinnati	10–12–1	5–17	13–9	—	7–15	13–9	9–13	5–17–1
New York	10–12–2	8–14	10–12	15–7	—	11–11	12–10	7–15
Philadelphia	11–11	11–11	16–6	9–13	11–11	—	13–9	10–12
Pittsburgh	10–12	6–16	11–11	13–9	10–12	9–13	—	12–10
St. Louis	16–6	12–10–1	14–8	17–5–1	15–7	12–10	10–12	—

=== Roster ===
1949 Boston Braves
Roster
Pitchers: 34 Johnny Antonelli; 13 Red Barrett; 17 Johnny Beazley; 24 Vern Bickford; 18 Glenn Elliott; 25 Bob Hall; 37 Bobby Hogue; 22 Nels Potter; 33 Johnny Sain; 26 Clyde Shoun; 21 Warren Spahn; 96 Bill Voiselle	Catchers: 23 Del Crandall; 10,26 Mickey Livingston; 10 Phil Masi; 15 Bill Salkeld; Infielders: 2 Alvin Dark; 3 Bob Elliott; 17 Elbie Fletcher; 14 Al Lakeman; 8 Connie Ryan; 6 Ray Sanders; 12 Eddie Stanky; 9 Earl Torgeson	Outfielders: 19 Clint Conatser; 4 Jeff Heath; 1 Tommy Holmes; 11 Pete Reiser; 31 Marv Rickert; 5 Jim Russell; 14 Ed Sauer; 7 Sibby Sisti; 23 Don Thompson; Other batters: 16 Steve Kuczek	Manager: 30 Billy Southworth; 28 Johnny Cooney; Coaches: 29 Jimmy Brown; 28 Johnny Cooney; 36 Si Johnson; 35 Bob Keely

== Player stats ==
=== Batting ===
==== Starters by position ====
Note: Pos = Position; G = Games played; AB = At bats; H = Hits; Avg. = Batting average; HR = Home runs; RBI = Runs batted in

Pos	Player	G	AB	H	Avg.	HR	RBI
C	Del Crandall	67	228	60	.263	4	34
1B	Elbie Fletcher	122	413	108	.262	11	51
2B	Eddie Stanky	138	506	144	.285	1	42
SS	Al Dark	130	529	146	.276	3	53
3B	Bob Elliott	139	482	135	.280	17	76
OF	Tommy Holmes	117	380	101	.266	8	59
OF	Marv Rickert	100	277	81	.292	6	49
OF	Jim Russell	130	415	96	.231	8	54

==== Other batters ====
Note: G = Games played; AB = At bats; H = Hits; Avg. = Batting average; HR = Home runs; RBI = Runs batted in

Player	G	AB	H	Avg.	HR	RBI
Sibby Sisti	101	268	69	.257	5	22
Pete Reiser	84	221	60	.271	8	40
Ed Sauer	79	214	57	.266	3	31
Connie Ryan	85	208	52	.250	6	20
Bill Salkeld	66	161	41	.255	5	25
Clint Conatser	53	152	40	.263	3	16
Jeff Heath	36	111	34	.306	9	23
Phil Masi	37	105	22	.210	0	6
Earl Torgeson	25	100	26	.260	4	19
Mickey Livingston	28	64	15	.234	0	6
Ray Sanders	9	21	3	.143	0	0
Don Thompson	7	11	2	.182	0	0
Al Lakeman	3	6	1	.167	0	0
Steve Kuczek	1	1	1	1.000	0	0

=== Pitching ===
==== Starting pitchers ====
Note: G = Games pitched; IP = Innings pitched; W = Wins; L = Losses; ERA = Earned run average; SO = Strikeouts

Player	G	IP	W	L	ERA	SO
Warren Spahn	38	302.1	21	14	3.07	151
Johnny Sain	37	243.0	10	17	4.81	73
Vern Bickford	37	230.2	16	11	4.25	101
Bill Voiselle	30	169.1	7	8	4.04	63

==== Other pitchers ====
Note: G = Games pitched; IP = Innings pitched; W = Wins; L = Losses; ERA = Earned run average; SO = Strikeouts

Player	G	IP	W	L	ERA	SO
Johnny Antonelli	22	96.0	3	7	3.56	48
Bob Hall	31	74.1	6	4	4.36	43
Glenn Elliott	22	68.1	3	4	3.95	15

==== Relief pitchers ====
Note: G = Games pitched; W = Wins; L = Losses; SV = Saves; ERA = Earned run average; SO = Strikeouts

Player	G	W	L	SV	ERA	SO
Nels Potter	41	6	11	7	4.19	57
Bobby Hogue	33	2	2	3	3.13	23
Red Barrett	23	1	1	0	5.68	17
Johnny Beazley	1	0	0	0	0.00	0
Clyde Shoun	1	0	0	0	0.00	0

== Farm system ==
Level	Team	League	Manager
AAA	Milwaukee Brewers	American Association	Nick Cullop
A	Hartford Chiefs	Eastern League	Earl Browne and Ripper Collins
A	Denver Bears	Western League	Mike Gazella, Bill DeCarlo and Earl Browne
B	Evansville Braves	Illinois–Indiana–Iowa League	Bob Coleman
B	Pawtucket Slaters	New England League	Ripper Collins, Earl Browne and Dutch Dorman
B	Jackson Senators	Southeastern League	Willis Hudlin
C	Eau Claire Bears	Northern League	Andy Cohen
D	Bluefield Blue-Grays	Appalachian League	Ernie White
D	Marysville Braves	Far West League	Rex Carr
D	Owensboro Oilers	KITTY League	Bill Adair
D	High Point-Thomasville Hi-Toms	North Carolina State League	Jim Gruzdis

LEAGUE CHAMPIONS: Bluefield, High Point-Thomasville
