= 1948 Boston Braves season =

Major League Baseball season

1948 Boston Braves
- National League champions
- League: National League
- Ballpark: Braves Field
- City: Boston, Massachusetts
- Record: 91–62 (.595)
- League place: 1st
- Owners: Louis R. Perini
- General managers: John J. Quinn
- Managers: Billy Southworth
- Television: WBZ-TV/WNAC-TV
- Radio: WHDH (Jim Britt, Tom Hussey)

The 1948 Boston Braves season was the 78th consecutive season of the Major League Baseball franchise, its 73rd in the National League. It produced the team's second NL pennant of the 20th century, its first since 1914, and its tenth overall league title dating to 1876.

Led by starting pitchers Johnny Sain and Warren Spahn (who combined for 39 victories), and the hitting of Bob Elliott, Jeff Heath, Tommy Holmes and rookie Alvin Dark, the 1948 Braves captured 91 games to finish 61/2 paces ahead of the second-place St. Louis Cardinals. They also attracted 1,455,439 fans to Braves Field, the third-largest gate in the National League and a high-water mark for the team's stay in Boston. The 1948 pennant was the fourth National League championship in seven years for Braves' manager Billy Southworth, who had won three NL titles (1942–44, inclusive) and two World Series championships (1942 and 1944) with the Cardinals. Southworth would be posthumously elected to the Baseball Hall of Fame as a manager in 2008.

However, the Braves fell in six games to the Cleveland Indians in the 1948 World Series, and would experience a swift decline in both on-field success and popularity over the next four seasons. Attendance woes—the Braves would draw only 281,278 home fans in 1952—forced the team's relocation to Milwaukee, Wisconsin, in March 1953. (It later moved to Atlanta in 1966.)

After playing .500 baseball in April and May 1948, the Braves vaulted into first place on the strength of a 39–21 record during June and July. Hampered by second baseman Eddie Stanky's broken ankle and center fielder Jim Russell's season-ending illness, the club slumped slightly in August, going only 14–17 and falling out of the lead August 29. But then it righted itself to win 21 of its final 28 games, regain the top spot September 2, and clinch the NL flag on the 26th. Meanwhile, the city's American League team, the Red Sox, ended their season in a first-place tie with the Indians and lost a playoff game to Cleveland at Fenway Park on October 4; this ruined the prospect of what would have been the only all-Boston World Series, now an impossibility since the Braves left Boston after the 1952 season. (The Tribe were doubtlessly very unpopular in Beantown after defeating both of their teams in the post-season.)

For both the Braves and Red Sox, the 1948 season was the first in which their games were broadcast on television, with telecasts alternating between WBZ-TV and WNAC-TV and the teams sharing the same announcers. The first-ever telecast of a major league game in New England occurred on Tuesday night, June 15, with the Braves defeating the visiting Chicago Cubs 6–3 behind Sain's complete game.

== Offseason ==
- October 28, 1947: Hoyt Wilhelm was purchased by the Braves from the Mooresville Moores. (Date given is approximate. Exact date is uncertain.)
- November 20, 1947: Hoyt Wilhelm was drafted from the Braves by the New York Giants in the 1947 minor league draft.
- March 6, 1948: Bama Rowell, Ray Sanders, and $40,000 were traded by the Braves to the Brooklyn Dodgers for Eddie Stanky.
- Prior to 1948 season: Carl Sawatski was acquired from the Braves by the Chicago Cubs.

== Regular season ==
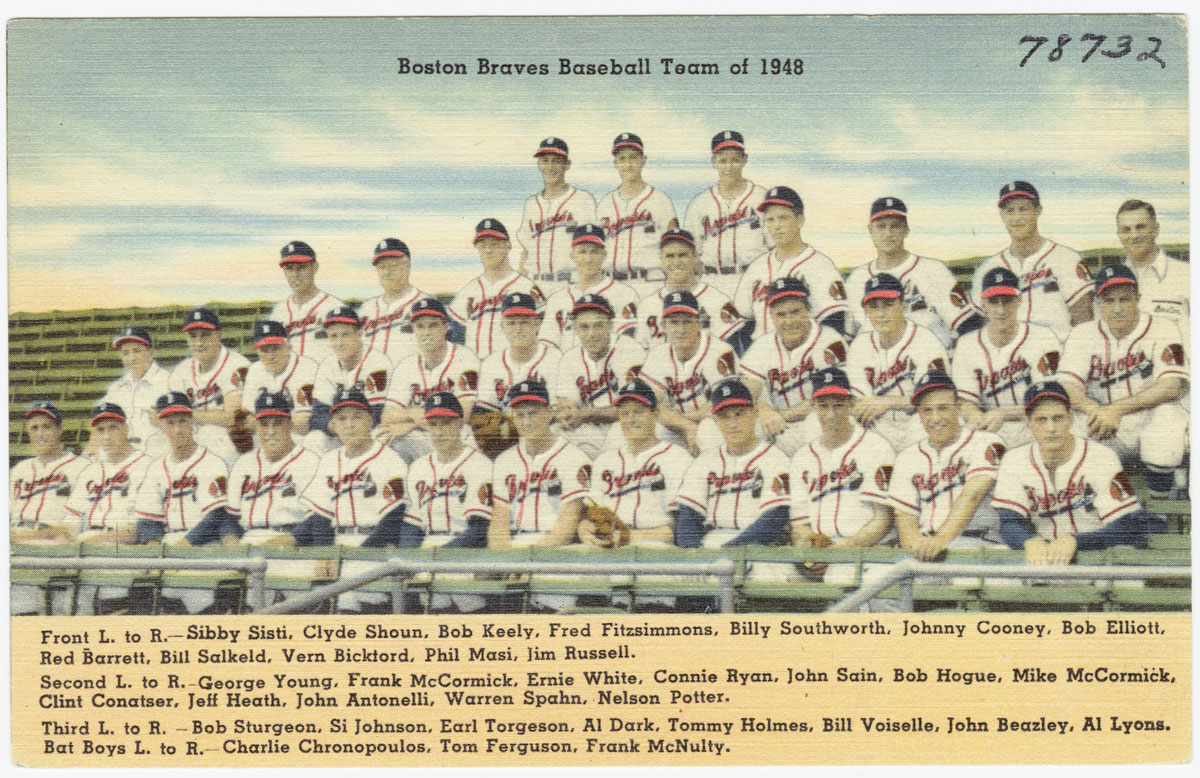
Postcard showing the team.

=== Season standings ===
National League
| Team | W | L | Pct. | GB | Home | Road |
|---|---|---|---|---|---|---|
| Boston Braves | 91 | 62 | .595 | — | 45‍–‍31 | 46‍–‍31 |
| St. Louis Cardinals | 85 | 69 | .552 | 6½ | 44‍–‍33 | 41‍–‍36 |
| Brooklyn Dodgers | 84 | 70 | .545 | 7½ | 36‍–‍41 | 48‍–‍29 |
| Pittsburgh Pirates | 83 | 71 | .539 | 8½ | 47‍–‍31 | 36‍–‍40 |
| New York Giants | 78 | 76 | .506 | 13½ | 37‍–‍40 | 41‍–‍36 |
| Philadelphia Phillies | 66 | 88 | .429 | 25½ | 32‍–‍44 | 34‍–‍44 |
| Cincinnati Reds | 64 | 89 | .418 | 27 | 32‍–‍45 | 32‍–‍44 |
| Chicago Cubs | 64 | 90 | .416 | 27½ | 35‍–‍42 | 29‍–‍48 |

=== Record vs. opponents ===
1948 National League record Sources:
| Team | BSN | BRO | CHC | CIN | NYG | PHI | PIT | STL |
|---|---|---|---|---|---|---|---|---|
| Boston | — | 14–8 | 16–6–1 | 13–8 | 11–11 | 14–8 | 12–10 | 11–11 |
| Brooklyn | 8–14 | — | 11–11 | 18–4 | 11–11–1 | 15–7 | 9–13 | 12–10 |
| Chicago | 6–16–1 | 11–11 | — | 10–12 | 11–11 | 7–15 | 8–14 | 11–11 |
| Cincinnati | 8–13 | 4–18 | 12–10 | — | 10–12 | 11–11 | 9–13 | 10–12 |
| New York | 11–11 | 11–11–1 | 11–11 | 12–10 | — | 14–8 | 12–10 | 7–15 |
| Philadelphia | 8–14 | 7–15 | 15–7 | 11–11 | 8–14 | — | 12–10–1 | 5–17 |
| Pittsburgh | 10–12 | 13–9 | 14–8 | 13–9 | 10–12 | 10–12–1 | — | 13–9–1 |
| St. Louis | 11–11 | 10–12 | 11–11 | 12–10 | 15–7 | 17–5 | 9–13–1 | — |

=== Roster ===
1948 Boston Braves
Roster
| Pitchers: 34 Johnny Antonelli; 13 Red Barrett; 17 Johnny Beazley; 24 Vern Bickford; 16 Glenn Elliott; 37 Bobby Hogue; 25 Al Lyons; 11 Ray Martin; 25,22 Nels Potter; 38 Jim Prendergast; 33 Johnny Sain; 26 Clyde Shoun; 21 Warren Spahn; 39,96 Bill Voiselle; 29 Ernie White; 16 Ed Wright | Catchers: 11 Paul Burris; 10 Phil Masi; 15 Bill Salkeld; Infielders: 2 Al Dark; 3 Bob Elliott; 6 Frank McCormick; 8 Connie Ryan; 7 Sibby Sisti; 12 Eddie Stanky; 14 Bobby Sturgeon; 9 Earl Torgeson | Outfielders: 19 Clint Conatser; 4,36 Jeff Heath; 1 Tommy Holmes; 7 Danny Litwhiler; 31 Mike McCormick; 4 Marv Rickert; 5 Jim Russell; Other batters: 5,20 Ray Sanders | Manager: 30 Billy Southworth; Coaches: 28 Johnny Cooney; 27 Fred Fitzsimmons; 36 Si Johnson; 35 Bob Keely |

== Player stats ==
| = Indicates team leader |

=== Batting ===
==== Starters by position ====
Note: Pos = Position; G = Games played; AB = At bats; H = Hits; Avg. = Batting average; HR = Home runs; RBI = Runs batted in

| Pos | Player | G | AB | H | Avg. | HR | RBI |
|---|---|---|---|---|---|---|---|
| C | Phil Masi | 113 | 376 | 95 | .253 | 5 | 44 |
| 1B | Earl Torgeson | 134 | 438 | 111 | .253 | 10 | 67 |
| 2B | Eddie Stanky | 67 | 247 | 79 | .320 | 2 | 29 |
| SS | Al Dark | 137 | 543 | 175 | .322 | 3 | 48 |
| 3B | Bob Elliott | 151 | 540 | 153 | .283 | 23 | 100 |
| OF | Tommy Holmes | 139 | 585 | 190 | .325 | 6 | 61 |
| OF | Jeff Heath | 115 | 364 | 116 | .319 | 20 | 76 |
| OF | Jim Russell | 89 | 322 | 85 | .264 | 9 | 54 |

==== Other batters ====
Note: G = Games played; AB = At bats; H = Hits; Avg. = Batting average; HR = Home runs; RBI = Runs batted in

| Player | G | AB | H | Avg. | HR | RBI |
|---|---|---|---|---|---|---|
| Mike McCormick | 115 | 343 | 104 | .303 | 1 | 39 |
| Clint Conatser | 90 | 224 | 60 | .277 | 3 | 23 |
| Sibby Sisti | 83 | 221 | 54 | .244 | 0 | 21 |
| Bill Salkeld | 78 | 198 | 48 | .242 | 8 | 28 |
| Frank McCormick | 75 | 180 | 45 | .250 | 4 | 34 |
| Connie Ryan | 51 | 122 | 26 | .213 | 0 | 10 |
| Bobby Sturgeon | 34 | 78 | 17 | .218 | 0 | 4 |
| Danny Litwhiler | 13 | 33 | 9 | .273 | 0 | 6 |
| Marv Rickert | 3 | 13 | 3 | .231 | 0 | 2 |
| Ray Sanders | 5 | 4 | 1 | .250 | 0 | 2 |
| Paul Burris | 2 | 4 | 2 | .500 | 0 | 0 |

=== Pitching ===
==== Starting pitchers ====
Note: G = Games pitched; IP = Innings pitched; W = Wins; L = Losses; ERA = Earned run average; SO = Strikeouts

| Player | G | IP | W | L | ERA | SO |
|---|---|---|---|---|---|---|
| Johnny Sain | 42 | 314.2 | 24 | 15 | 2.60 | 137 |
| Warren Spahn | 36 | 257.0 | 15 | 12 | 3.71 | 114 |
| Bill Voiselle | 37 | 215.2 | 13 | 13 | 3.63 | 89 |
| Vern Bickford | 33 | 146.0 | 11 | 5 | 3.27 | 60 |
| Glenn Elliott | 1 | 3.0 | 1 | 0 | 3.00 | 2 |

==== Other pitchers ====
Note: G = Games pitched; IP = Innings pitched; W = Wins; L = Losses; ERA = Earned run average; SO = Strikeouts

| Player | G | IP | W | L | ERA | SO |
|---|---|---|---|---|---|---|
| Red Barrett | 32 | 128.1 | 7 | 8 | 3.65 | 40 |
| Nels Potter | 18 | 85.0 | 5 | 2 | 2.33 | 47 |
| Jim Prendergast | 10 | 16.2 | 1 | 1 | 10.26 | 3 |
| Johnny Beazley | 3 | 16.0 | 0 | 1 | 4.50 | 4 |

==== Relief pitchers ====
Note: G = Games pitched; W = Wins; L = Losses; SV = Saves; ERA = Earned run average; SO = Strikeouts

| Player | G | W | L | SV | ERA | SO |
|---|---|---|---|---|---|---|
| Clyde Shoun | 36 | 5 | 1 | 4 | 4.01 | 25 |
| Bobby Hogue | 40 | 8 | 2 | 2 | 3.23 | 43 |
| Ernie White | 15 | 0 | 2 | 2 | 1.96 | 8 |
| Al Lyons | 7 | 1 | 0 | 0 | 7.82 | 5 |
| Johnny Antonelli | 4 | 0 | 0 | 0 | 2.25 | 0 |
| Ed Wright | 3 | 0 | 0 | 0 | 1.93 | 2 |
| Ray Martin | 2 | 0 | 0 | 0 | 0.00 | 0 |

== 1948 World Series ==
=== Game 1 ===
October 6, 1948, at Braves Field in Boston, Massachusetts

| Team | 1 | 2 | 3 | 4 | 5 | 6 | 7 | 8 | 9 | R | H | E |
|---|---|---|---|---|---|---|---|---|---|---|---|---|
| Cleveland | 0 | 0 | 0 | 0 | 0 | 0 | 0 | 0 | 0 | 0 | 4 | 0 |
| Boston | 0 | 0 | 0 | 0 | 0 | 0 | 0 | 1 | X | 1 | 2 | 2 |
WP: Johnny Sain (1–0) LP: Bob Feller (0–1)

=== Game 2 ===
October 7, 1948, at Braves Field in Boston, Massachusetts

| Team | 1 | 2 | 3 | 4 | 5 | 6 | 7 | 8 | 9 | R | H | E |
|---|---|---|---|---|---|---|---|---|---|---|---|---|
| Cleveland | 0 | 0 | 0 | 2 | 1 | 0 | 0 | 0 | 1 | 4 | 8 | 1 |
| Boston | 1 | 0 | 0 | 0 | 0 | 0 | 0 | 0 | 0 | 1 | 8 | 3 |
WP: Bob Lemon (1–0) LP: Warren Spahn (0–1)

=== Game 3 ===
October 8 at Cleveland Municipal Stadium in Cleveland, Ohio

| Team | 1 | 2 | 3 | 4 | 5 | 6 | 7 | 8 | 9 | R | H | E |
|---|---|---|---|---|---|---|---|---|---|---|---|---|
| Boston | 0 | 0 | 0 | 0 | 0 | 0 | 0 | 0 | 0 | 0 | 5 | 1 |
| Cleveland | 0 | 0 | 1 | 1 | 0 | 0 | 0 | 0 | X | 2 | 5 | 0 |
WP: Gene Bearden (1–0) LP: Vern Bickford (0–1)

=== Game 4 ===
October 9, 1948, at Cleveland Municipal Stadium in Cleveland, Ohio

| Team | 1 | 2 | 3 | 4 | 5 | 6 | 7 | 8 | 9 | R | H | E |
|---|---|---|---|---|---|---|---|---|---|---|---|---|
| Boston | 0 | 0 | 0 | 0 | 0 | 0 | 1 | 0 | 0 | 1 | 7 | 0 |
| Cleveland | 1 | 0 | 1 | 0 | 0 | 0 | 0 | 0 | X | 2 | 5 | 0 |
WP: Steve Gromek (1–0) LP: Johnny Sain (1–1); Home runs: BOS: Marv Rickert (1); CLE: Larry Doby (1)

=== Game 5 ===
October 10, 1948, at Cleveland Municipal Stadium in Cleveland, Ohio

| Team | 1 | 2 | 3 | 4 | 5 | 6 | 7 | 8 | 9 | R | H | E |
|---|---|---|---|---|---|---|---|---|---|---|---|---|
| Boston | 3 | 0 | 1 | 0 | 0 | 1 | 6 | 0 | 0 | 11 | 12 | 0 |
| Cleveland | 1 | 0 | 0 | 4 | 0 | 0 | 0 | 0 | 0 | 5 | 6 | 2 |
WP: Warren Spahn (1–1) LP: Bob Feller (0–2); Home runs: BOS: Bob Elliott 2 (2), Bill Salkeld (1); CLE: Dale Mitchell (1), Jim Hegan (1)

=== Game 6 ===
October 11, 1948, at Braves Field in Boston, Massachusetts

| Team | 1 | 2 | 3 | 4 | 5 | 6 | 7 | 8 | 9 | R | H | E |
|---|---|---|---|---|---|---|---|---|---|---|---|---|
| Cleveland | 0 | 0 | 1 | 0 | 0 | 2 | 0 | 1 | 0 | 4 | 10 | 0 |
| Boston | 0 | 0 | 0 | 1 | 0 | 0 | 0 | 2 | 0 | 3 | 9 | 0 |
WP: Bob Lemon (2–0) LP: Bill Voiselle (0–1); Home runs: CLE: Joe Gordon (1); BOS: None

== Farm system ==
| Level | Team | League | Manager |
|---|---|---|---|
| AAA | Milwaukee Brewers | American Association | Nick Cullop |
| A | Hartford Chiefs | Eastern League | Earl Browne |
| B | Evansville Braves | Illinois–Indiana–Iowa League | Bob Coleman |
| B | Pawtucket Slaters | New England League | Hughie Wise |
| B | Jackson Senators | Southeastern League | Willis Hudlin |
| C | Kingston Ponies | Border League | Ben Lady |
| C | Eau Claire Bears | Northern League | Andy Cohen |
| C | Leavenworth Braves | Western Association | Dutch Dorman |
| D | Bluefield Blue-Grays | Appalachian League | George Lacy |
| D | Marysville Braves | Far West League | Ed Wheeler, James Keller and Spencer Harris |
| D | Mount Vernon Braves | Illinois State League | Creepy Crespi |
| D | Owensboro Oilers | KITTY League | Rex Carr |
| D | High Point-Thomasville Hi-Toms | North Carolina State League | Jim Gruzdis |
| D | Richmond Braves | Ohio–Indiana League | Ollie Byers |

LEAGUE CHAMPIONS: Evansville
