= 1948 Major League Baseball postseason =

1948 Major League Baseball season tiebreaker series

Tournament details
- Dates: October 4-11, 1948
- Teams: 3

Final positions
- Champions: Cleveland Indians (2nd title)
- Runners-up: Boston Braves

The 1948 Major League Baseball season resulted in a tie for the American League pennant between the Cleveland Indians and Boston Red Sox. Both finished the regular season with identical 96-58 records.

The tie thus required a one-game playoff to be held between the two teams. This game was played on October 4, 1948 at Fenway Park in Boston. The Indians defeated the Red Sox and advanced to the 1948 World Series, where they defeated the National League champion Boston Braves in six games.

== Bracket ==
American League playoff			World Series
			AL	Cleveland	4
AL	Cleveland	1	NL	Boston Braves	2
AL	Boston Red Sox	0

== American League tiebreaker playoff ==
=== Cleveland Indians vs. Boston Red Sox ===
Monday, October 4, 1948 1:15 pm (ET) at Fenway Park in Boston, Massachusetts
Team	1	2	3	4	5	6	7	8	9	R	H	E
Cleveland	1	0	0	4	1	0	0	1	1	8	13	1
Boston	1	0	0	0	0	2	0	0	0	3	5	1
WP: Gene Bearden (20–7) LP: Denny Galehouse (8–8); Home runs: CLE: Lou Boudreau 2 (18), Ken Keltner (31); BRS: Bobby Doerr (27); Attendance: 33,957; Notes: Game duration 2 hours and 24 minutes Boxscore

The Indians defeated the Red Sox to advance to the World Series for the first time since 1920 (in the process denying what would have been the only all-Boston World Series between the Red Sox and Braves).

Gene Bearden pitched a complete game and Lou Boudreau hit two homers as the Indians blew out the Red Sox to clinch the pennant.

This was the last time the Indians and Red Sox played for the pennant until the ALCS in 2007, where the Red Sox returned the favor and defeated the Indians in seven games en route to a World Series title after trailing 3–1 in the series.

== 1948 World Series ==
=== Cleveland Indians (AL) vs. Boston Braves (NL) ===
Cleveland won the series, 4–2.

Game	Date	Score	Location	Time	Attendance
1	October 6	Cleveland Indians – 0, Boston Braves – 1	Braves Field	1:42	40,135
2	October 7	Cleveland Indians – 4, Boston Braves – 1	Braves Field	2:14	39,633
3	October 8	Boston Braves – 0, Cleveland Indians – 2	Cleveland Municipal Stadium	1:36	70,306
4	October 9	Boston Braves – 1, Cleveland Indians – 2	Cleveland Municipal Stadium	1:31	81,897
5	October 10	Boston Braves – 11, Cleveland Indians – 5	Cleveland Municipal Stadium	2:39	86,288
6	October 11	Cleveland Indians – 4, Boston Braves – 3	Braves Field	2:16	40,103

This was the first World Series matchup between the Indians and Braves. The Indians defeated the Braves in six games to win their first title since 1920.

Game 1 was a complete game pitchers’ duel between Johnny Sain and Bob Feller, which would be won by the former as Sain pitched a four-hit shutout in a 1-0 Braves victory. Bob Lemon pitched a complete game in Game 2 as the Indians evened the series headed to Cleveland. In Game 3, Gene Bearden pitched a five-hit complete game shutout as the Indians took the series lead. Game 4 was yet another complete game pitchers’ duel between Sain and Steve Gromek, which was won by the latter as the Indians took a 3–1 series lead. In Game 5, Bob Elliott homered twice as the Braves blew out the Indians to send the series back to Boston. In Game 6, Lemon pitched seven solid innings and Joe Gordon’s solo homer in the top of the sixth put the Indians in the lead for good as they secured the title. Game 6 was the last postseason game ever played at Braves Field.

This was the Braves’ last World Series appearance during their time in Boston, as the team would move to Milwaukee in 1953. The Braves would return to the World Series in 1957, and defeated the New York Yankees in seven games for their second championship.

As of 2026, this is Cleveland’s last World Series victory, and they currently hold the longest championship drought in the majors. The Indians would return to the World Series in 1954 boasting 111 wins to their record, but were shockingly swept by the New York Giants, which started a streak of what is currently four consecutive losses in the World Series for the team. The only team of the four major North American leagues with a longer championship drought are the NFL’s Arizona Cardinals, who last won a championship in 1947 as the Chicago Cardinals, a year before Cleveland’s World Series victory.

The Braves and Indians would meet again in the World Series almost half a century later in 1995, where the Braves returned the favor and defeated the Indians in six games.
