= Ray Sanders (baseball) =

American baseball player (1916–1983)

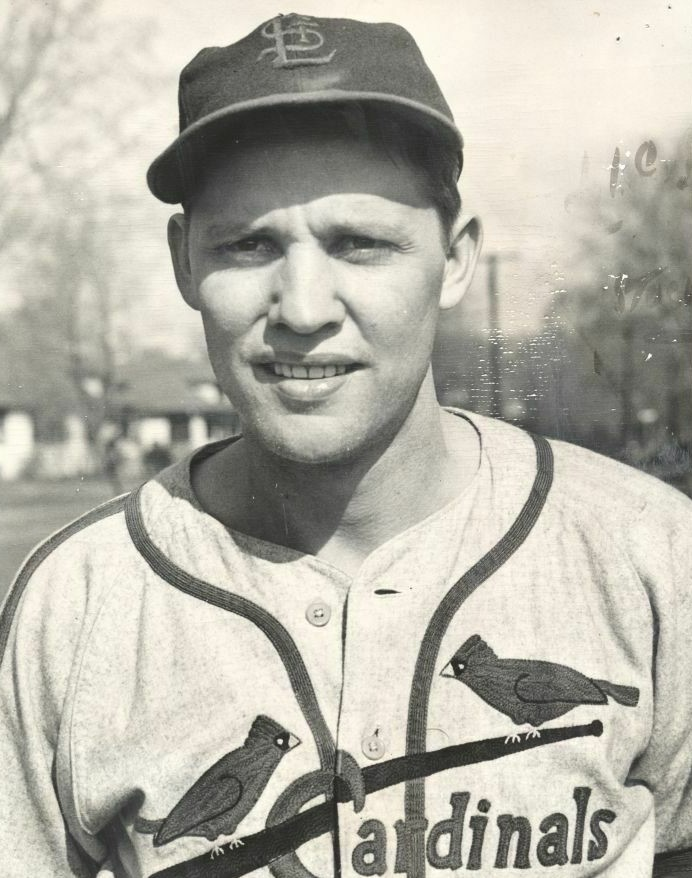
- First baseman
- Born: December 4, 1916; Bonne Terre, Missouri, U.S.
- Died: October 28, 1983 (aged 66); Washington, Missouri, U.S.
- Batted: Left Threw: Right

MLB debut
- April 14, 1942, for the St. Louis Cardinals

Last MLB appearance
- September 21, 1949, for the Boston Braves

MLB statistics
- Batting average: .274
- Home runs: 42
- Runs batted in: 329
- Stats at Baseball Reference

Teams
- St. Louis Cardinals (1942–1945); Boston Braves (1946, 1948–1949)

Career highlights and awards
- 2× World Series champion (1942, 1944)

Raymond Floyd Sanders (December 4, 1916 – October 28, 1983) was an American professional baseball player. Primarily a first baseman, he played all or part of six seasons in Major League Baseball between 1942 and 1949.

== Early life ==
Sanders was born in Bonne Terre, Missouri.

== Playing career ==
=== Cardinals ===
Sanders was originally signed by the St. Louis Cardinals in 1938. From 1939 to 1941 he was named to his league's all-star team as either a starter or honorable mention each year.

Following the 1941 season, Cardinals general manager Branch Rickey traded future Hall of Fame first baseman Johnny Mize to the New York Giants, opening a spot for Sanders. Sanders made his MLB debut for the Cardinals on April 14, 1942. He and Johnny Hopp split time at first base through mid August, with Hopp receiving the lion's share of playing time from that point on, as well as starting all five games in the 1942 World Series, which the Cardinals won over the New York Yankees.

Sanders became the Cardinals full-time first baseman in 1943, with Hopp moving to a utility role. The Cardinals won their second straight National League pennant, but lost a rematch with the Yankees in the 1943 World Series in five games. In their lone win in Game Two, Sanders followed Whitey Kurowski's home run with one of his own, which wound up being the margin of victory in the 4–3 win.

In 1944, Sanders had his best year, finishing 15th in the voting for the National League Most Valuable Player Award. He set career highs in batting average, home runs, and runs batted in, helping the Cardinals to return to the 1944 World Series. This time playing against the St. Louis Browns in their only World Series appearance, Sanders hit a home run in Game Five to help the Cardinals to a 2–0 win, with the Cardinals also winning Game Six to close out the Series.

In 1945, the Cardinals lost several of their star players, most notably Stan Musial, to World War II service, and failed to return to the World Series, finishing three games behind the Chicago Cubs. When Musial returned in 1946, the team intended to make him their regular first baseman. To make room, Sanders' contract was sold to the Boston Braves for $25,000.

=== Braves ===
Sanders began the 1946 season as the Braves' regular first baseman, but he suffered a severe arm injury in August in a collision with Erv Dusak and missed the rest of the season. Hopp, who had also been acquired by the Braves during the previous offseason, once again filling in for him. Sanders, whose arm had been broken in three places missed the entire 1947 season as well. Meanwhile, Earl Torgeson had entrenched himself as the Braves' starting first baseman in the interim.

On March 6, 1948, Sanders was involved in yet another trade centering on a future Hall of Famer. The Brooklyn Dodgers had used Jackie Robinson as a first baseman in 1947, but in 1948 the decision was made to move him to his more natural position as a second baseman. To make room, their 1947 second baseman, Eddie Stanky, was traded to the Braves for Sanders, Bama Rowell and $40,000. Sanders did not stay in the Dodgers organization long however, as he was returned to the Braves on April 18 for $60,000, partially because he was "damaged goods" since his arm still hadn't healed fully.

Sanders began the 1948 season in the minor leagues, first with the Pacific Coast League's Seattle Rainiers. When he was unable to get playing time due to Seattle's high level of talent, he was reassigned to the Class A Hartford Chiefs. He finally returned to the major leagues in September, appearing in five games, all as a pinch hitter. Despite his lack of playing time, he was on the Braves' roster for the 1948 World Series due to injuries to Jeff Heath and Jim Russell. In his lone appearance in the Series, he made the last out of Game Two off Bob Lemon as a pinch hitter, tapping the first pitch he saw back to the mound.

Sanders made the Braves as a bench player in 1949, but again missed most of the season due to injury. He broke his wrist during spring training, and wound up playing just nine games, his last in the major leagues, with his final game coming on September 1. After spending 1950 with the minor league Milwaukee Brewers, he retired.

=== Career statistics ===
In a seven-year, 630 game career, Sanders compiled a .274 batting average (597-for-2182) with 321 runs, 42 home runs and 329 RBI. He posted a career .991 fielding percentage. In four World Series appearances (1942,'43,'44,'48) he batted .275 (11-for-40) with 9 runs, 2 home runs, 3 RBI and 9 walks.

== Later life ==
Well after his playing days, Sanders went into scouting with the Cleveland Indians. He was married to Bernice Magre of Crystal City, Missouri for 40 years, and they had a daughter (Sandra) and a son (James). Sanders died in an automobile accident in Washington, Missouri on October 28, 1983 at age 66.
