= Glenn Elliott =

Glenn Elliott may refer to:

- Glenn Elliott (footballer) (born 1950), former Australian rules footballer
- Glenn Elliott (baseball) (1919–1969), former Boston Braves pitcher
- Glenn Elliott (politician) (born 1971), American politician
