= Bobby Hogue =

American baseball player (1921-1987)

- Pitcher
- Born: April 5, 1921; Miami, Florida, U.S.
- Died: December 22, 1987 (aged 66); Miami, Florida, U.S.
- Batted: Right Threw: Right

MLB debut
- April 24, 1948, for the Boston Braves

Last MLB appearance
- September 27, 1952, for the St. Louis Browns

MLB statistics
- Win–loss record: 18–16
- Earned run average: 3.97
- Strikeouts: 108
- Stats at Baseball Reference

Teams
- Boston Braves (1948–1951); St Louis Browns (1951); New York Yankees (1951–1952); St. Louis Browns (1952)

Career highlights and awards
- World Series champion (1951)

Robert Clinton Hogue (April 5, 1921 – December 22, 1987) was an American professional baseball player, a right-handed relief pitcher who appeared in 172 Major League games over five seasons (1948–1952) for the Boston Braves, St. Louis Browns and New York Yankees. The native of Miami, Florida, stood 5 feet 10 inches (1.78 m) tall and was listed at 190 pounds (86 kg) during his pitching career. He was a United States Navy veteran of World War II.

In his rookie MLB season with the 1948 Braves, Hogue appeared in 40 games and compiled an 8–2 record, an earned run average of 3.23 and two saves to help Boston win its last National League pennant. In his only starting assignment, on July 8 against the Brooklyn Dodgers, he pitched ineffectively and lasted only two innings, but the Braves came back to win the contest, 7–4. He did not appear in the 1948 World Series. During his tenure with the Braves, Hogue learned to throw the knuckleball, which became an effective pitch in his repertoire.

Three seasons later, Hogue bounced from the Braves to the second division St. Louis Browns of the American League to the powerhouse Yankees' Triple-A Kansas City Blues into mid-August. But on August 20, 1951, the Yankees recalled Hogue and another player from the Blues for the stretch run, and each contributed to New York's third straight AL pennant. (The other player was a 19-year-old rookie centerfielder named Mickey Mantle.) During the rest of the American League season, Hogue appeared in seven games in relief for the Yanks, allowing four hits and no runs in 7 1/3 innings pitched and winning his only decision. In the 1951 World Series, Hogue appeared in two games (both Yankee losses) in relief, but only allowed one hit, a single to former teammate Eddie Stanky in Game 3, and did not allow any inherited baserunners to score. Those two games were the only games lost by the Yankees in a six-game triumph over their NL neighbors, the New York Giants.

The Yankees placed him on waivers on August 2. and he was claimed by the Browns on August 4. Hogue pitched eight games during August and September.

Hogue pitched for the Toronto Maple Leafs of the Triple-A International League in 1953. He continued with the Maple Leafs into the 1954 season, choosing to voluntarily retire mid-season. The Maple Leafs released him on August 6. However, he signed a contract on April 27, 1955 with the Minneapolis Millers.

After serving as a circulation bureau manager for the Miami Herald, Hogue died on December 22, 1987, after a long illness.
