= Marv Rickert =

American baseball player (1921–1978)

- Outfielder
- Born: January 8, 1921; Longbranch, Washington, U.S.
- Died: June 3, 1978 (aged 57); Oakville, Washington, U.S.
- Batted: Left Threw: Right

MLB debut
- September 10, 1942, for the Chicago Cubs

Last MLB appearance
- September 26, 1950, for the Chicago White Sox

MLB statistics
- Batting average: .247
- Home runs: 19
- Runs batted in: 145
- Stats at Baseball Reference

Teams
- Chicago Cubs (1942, 1946–1947); Cincinnati Reds (1948); Boston Braves (1948–1949); Pittsburgh Pirates (1950); Chicago White Sox (1950)

Marvin August Rickert (January 8, 1921 – June 3, 1978) was an American professional baseball player. The native of Longbranch, Washington, was an outfielder who appeared in 402 Major League games in 1942 and from 1946 to 1950 for the Chicago Cubs, Cincinnati Reds, Boston Braves, Pittsburgh Pirates and Chicago White Sox. He batted left-handed, threw right-handed, stood 6 feet 2 inches (1.88 m) tall and weighed 195 pounds (88 kg). He served in the United States Coast Guard during World War II.

Rickert is perhaps best known for his tenure with the Boston Braves in 1948–49. Acquired by Boston from Cincinnati in a May 11, 1948, trade for fellow outfielder Danny Litwhiler, Rickert spent the following 3 1/2 months with the Braves' Triple-A Milwaukee Brewers farm club, batting .302 with 27 home runs and 117 runs batted in in 128 games, as the MLB Braves won the National League pennant.

== 'Emergency' player during 1948 World Series ==
Rickert was not summoned to Boston when the Brewers' season ended and returned home to his native Washington. But on September 29, three days after the Braves clinched the NL pennant, starting left fielder Jeff Heath broke his ankle while sliding into home plate against the Brooklyn Dodgers, knocking him out of action for the 1948 World Series, just seven days away.

Needing a left-handed hitting outfielder to replace Heath, the Braves put in an urgent call to Rickert, summoned him back East, and placed him on their roster, while successfully appealing to Commissioner of Baseball Happy Chandler to make Rickert eligible for the World Series on an emergency basis. Rickert — temporarily inheriting Heath's #4 Braves' uniform — shook off the rust by starting Boston's final three regular season games in left field (collecting three hits in 13 at bats, including a triple). He then started Game 1 of the 1948 Fall Classic against the Cleveland Indians, and got one of the Braves' two hits in their 1–0 victory over Bob Feller at Braves Field. Held hitless in Game 2, then out of the lineup in the third game against southpaw Gene Bearden, he returned to the starting lineup in Game 4 to collect two more hits in four at bats off Steve Gromek, one of them a solo home run for the Braves' only tally in a 2–1 defeat. Rickert then started the final two games of the Series as well, but collected only one hit in eight at bats. All told, he batted .211 in the World Series (four for 19), won by Cleveland in six games.

Rickert made the 1949 Braves roster and enjoyed his finest Major League season that year. Replacing Heath as Boston's most-used left fielder, Rickert appeared in an even 100 games and batted .292 with six home runs and 49 runs batted in. But Rickert's time in Boston was over: his contract was sold to the Pirates in December. Rickert would split the 1950 season between Pittsburgh and the White Sox, then play two more years in the minors before retiring after the 1952 season.

During his Major League career, Rickert collected 284 hits, including 45 doubles, nine triples, and 19 home runs.

== Death ==
Rickert died from a heart attack at the age of 57 on June 3, 1978, on his farm in Oakville, Washington.
