= Phil Masi =

American baseball player (1916–1990)

- Catcher
- Born: January 6, 1916; Chicago, Illinois, U.S.
- Died: March 29, 1990 (aged 74); Mount Prospect, Illinois, U.S.
- Batted: Right Threw: Right

MLB debut
- April 23, 1939, for the Boston Braves

Last MLB appearance
- August 17, 1952, for the Chicago White Sox

MLB statistics
- Batting average: .264
- Home runs: 47
- Runs batted in: 417
- Stats at Baseball Reference

Teams
- Boston Braves (1939–1949); Pittsburgh Pirates (1949); Chicago White Sox (1950–1952)

Career highlights and awards
- 4× All-Star (1945–1948)

Philip Samuel Masi (January 6, 1916 – March 29, 1990) was an American professional baseball player. He played in Major League Baseball as a catcher from 1939 to 1952, most prominently for the Boston Braves where he was a four-time All-Star player and was an integral member of the 1948 National League pennant-winning team.

Although Masi was considered one of the best defensive catchers of his era, he was also notable for his involvement in a controversial play that occurred during the 1948 World Series between the Boston Braves and the Cleveland Indians. He also played for the Pittsburgh Pirates and the Chicago White Sox.

== Playing career ==
=== Early career ===
Born in Chicago, Masi attended Austin High School, then began his professional baseball career when he was contracted in 1936 by the Cleveland Indians at the age of 20. In 1937, he played for the Wausau Timberjacks and demonstrated his versatility by playing as a catcher, outfielder, third baseman and as a first baseman. Masi became known as the Pepper Martin of the Northern League because of his head-first slides and prancing running style, while leading the league with 31 home runs and being named to the league's All-Star team.

Masi was then purchased by the Milwaukee Brewers who assigned him to play for the Springfield Indians of the Middle Atlantic League. Baseball Commissioner Kenesaw Mountain Landis found this move to be in violation of baseball rules and allowed him to sign a non-reserve contract with Springfield, meaning that he would be a free agent at the end of the season. He played mostly as a catcher for Springfield in 1938 where his backup that year was the future All-Star catcher for the Cleveland Indians, seventeen-year-old Jim Hegan. Masi posted a .308 batting average with 16 home runs and 97 runs batted in for Springfield, earning a promotion to the major leagues when he was signed by the Boston Braves, then known as the Bees.

The Bees already had future Hall of Fame member, Al López, as well as future All-Star, Ray Mueller and veteran Johnny Riddle as catchers going into spring training in 1939 however, Masi impressed Bees' manager Casey Stengel so much that, Mueller and Riddle would be traded before the start of the season, leaving Masi as Lopez's backup. He made his major league debut with the Bees on April 23, 1939 at the age of 23. After his father died in 1942, he was given a 3-A draft classification exempting him from military duty as he was the sole support for his family.

Masi served as the Braves' backup catcher first to Al López, then Ray Berres, and finally to Ernie Lombardi. He began to develop his reputation as a good defensive catcher from his association with knuckleball pitcher Jim Tobin. The other Braves catchers shunned Tobin due to the unpredictability of the notoriously difficult to catch knuckleball and, Masi took over the job as his catcher. When Lombardi was traded to the New York Giants in 1943, Masi became the Braves regular catcher. His work with Tobin paid off on April 27, 1944 when Tobin pitched a no hitter against the Brooklyn Dodgers.

=== All-Star ===
Masi's batting continued to improve in 1945 when he was hitting at a .335 pace in July to earn a place as a reserve catcher for the National League team in the 1945 All-Star Game however, the game was cancelled due to wartime travel restrictions. Masi finished the season with a .272 batting average along with 25 doubles, 7 home runs and 46 runs batted in. He also led National League catchers in assists and was second in putouts and in baserunners caught stealing.

Masi was hitting for a .300 average in late June 1946, earning him a place as a reserve player for the National League in the 1946 All-Star Game. He ended the season with a .267 average, 3 home runs, a career-high 62 runs batted in and, led the league's catchers in putouts. In 1946, pitchers Warren Spahn and Johnny Sain returned to the Braves from their military service and, their success further enhanced Masi's reputation for handling pitching staffs. Sain won 20 games in 1946 and led the league with 24 complete games as the Braves improved to a fourth-place finish in the National League standings.

Masi had his most productive season in 1947, earning his third selection as a reserve for the National League in the 1947 All-Star Game and ending the year ranked tenth in the league in hitting with a career-high .304 batting average. He also posted career-highs in home runs (9) and in on-base percentage (.377) and continued to build upon his excellent defensive reputation by leading National League catchers with a .989 fielding percentage. Masi guided the Braves' pitching staff to a league-leading 14 shutouts and the second-best team earned run average in the league, as both Spahn and Sain won 21 games each. The Braves continued to improve, finishing the 1947 season in third place behind the Dodgers and Cardinals.

Although Masi's offensive output began to decline in 1948, he earned his fourth consecutive All-Star selection due to his excellent defensive abilities. His pitch-calling skills helped the Braves' pitching staff lead the league in earned run average as the team clinched the 1948 National League pennant by six and a half games over the St. Louis Cardinals. He also contributed a .253 batting average with 19 doubles, 5 home runs and 44 runs batted in.

=== 1948 World Series controversy ===
It was in the first game of the 1948 World Series held at Braves Field against the favored Cleveland Indians that Masi would become embroiled in a controversy that secured his place in baseball history. The Braves' Johnny Sain and Indians' Bob Feller were engaged in a scoreless pitchers' duel when the Braves came to bat in the bottom of the eighth inning. Feller walked Braves catcher Bill Salkeld to open the inning. Braves manager Billy Southworth then substituted the slow-footed Salkeld with Masi, who entered the game as a pinch runner. Mike McCormick followed with a sacrifice bunt, advancing Masi to second base. Feller issued an intentional walk to Eddie Stanky, who was replaced by Sibby Sisti. Feller then made a pick off attempt of Masi at second base. Indians' shortstop Lou Boudreau appeared to tag Masi out, but umpire Bill Stewart called him safe. Tommy Holmes followed with a single that scored Masi with the only run of the game, giving the Braves a 1-0 victory. The umpire's controversial ruling touched off heated debates among the media and fans, especially after Associated Press photographs of the play were published. Although the victory gave the Braves a 1-0 lead, the Indians won the World Series in six games.

=== Later career ===
Masi's offensive production continued to decline and, with young prospect Del Crandall ready to play, the Braves traded Masi to the Pittsburgh Pirates in June 1949. After only a half-season with Pittsburgh, he was traded to his hometown Chicago White Sox in 1950. He earned the starting catchers job with the White Sox and helped them become a respectable team with his handling of the pitching staff. The team's earned run average ranked sixth in the league prior to Masi's arrival. With Masi handling the pitching staff, the team's earned run average improved to fourth best in 1950. He had a .279 batting average in 1950 and led all American League catchers with a .996 fielding percentage, committing only two errors in 114 games. In 1951, Masi's experience was again evident as he helped the White Sox pitching staff improve their earned run average to second best in the American League behind the Cleveland Indians. He hit for a .271 batting average in 1951 at the age of 35. When the White Sox acquired a younger Sherm Lollar in 1952, Masi returned to backup duties before being released at the end of the season.

Masi returned to the minor leagues in 1953 where he helped the Dallas Eagles win the Texas League championship before going on to win the 1953 Dixie Series. He retired as a player at the end of the 1953 season at the age of 37.

== Career statistics ==
In a fourteen-year major league career, Masi played in 1,229 games, accumulating 917 hits in 3,468 at bats for a .264 career batting average along with 47 home runs, 417 runs batted in and a .344 on-base percentage. Over his career, he committed only 72 errors in 4,257 chances for a career .983 fielding percentage. A four-time All-Star, he led National League catchers in fielding percentage twice and, American League catchers once. A fast running catcher, he collected 45 stolen bases in his career and was often used in pinch-running duties.

Masi died on March 29, 1990 in Mount Prospect, Illinois, at the age of 74. Upon his death, his will revealed that he really was out on the pick-off play in the 1948 World Series.
