= Jim Hegan =

American baseball player (1920–1984)

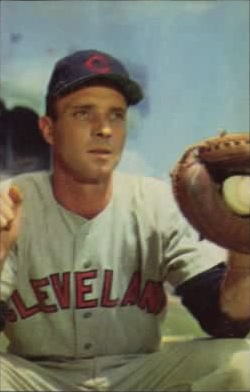
- Hegan, c. 1953
- Catcher
- Born: August 3, 1920; Lynn, Massachusetts, U.S.
- Died: June 17, 1984 (aged 63); Swampscott, Massachusetts, U.S.
- Batted: Right Threw: Right

MLB debut
- September 9, 1941, for the Cleveland Indians

Last MLB appearance
- July 4, 1960, for the Chicago Cubs

MLB statistics
- Batting average: .228
- Home runs: 92
- Runs batted in: 525
- Stats at Baseball Reference

Teams
- Cleveland Indians (1941–1942, 1946–1957); Detroit Tigers (1958); Philadelphia Phillies (1958–1959); San Francisco Giants (1959); Chicago Cubs (1960)

Career highlights and awards
- 5× All-Star (1947, 1949–1952); 3× World Series champion (1948, 1961, 1962); Cleveland Guardians Hall of Fame

James Edward Hegan (August 3, 1920 – June 17, 1984) was an American professional baseball player, coach, and scout. He played for 17 seasons as a catcher in Major League Baseball (MLB) from 1941 to 1942 and 1946 to 1960, most prominently with the Cleveland Indians where he was an integral member of the 1948 World Series winning team. A five-time All-Star player, Hegan was a light-hitting player offensively, but he distinguished himself as one of the best defensive catchers of his era as well as a capable handler of pitching staffs.

After retiring as a player, he continued to serve as a major league coach in a baseball career that spanned almost 40 years. Hegan was inducted into the Cleveland Indians Hall of Fame in 1966.

== Early life and Major League career ==
Born in Lynn, Massachusetts, Hegan attended Lynn English High School and was signed by the Cleveland Indians in 1938. After playing in the minor leagues for four seasons, he made his major league debut with the Indians on September 7, 1941 at the age of 20. Hegan appeared in 68 games for the Indians in 1942, before joining the United States Coast Guard for the remainder of the Second World War.

== Post-war career ==
When Hegan returned in 1946 he became the Indians' regular starting catcher, replacing Frankie Hayes. In his second season back after the war, Hegan was recognized as one of the top catchers in the American League when, he was selected as a reserve in the 1947 All-Star Game. He had his best season offensively in 1948, posting a .248 batting average along with 14 home runs and 61 runs batted in, as the Indians finished the season tied for first place with the Boston Red Sox.

After defeating the Red Sox in a one-game playoff, the Indians went on to defeat the Boston Braves in the 1948 World Series. Despite his low batting average, Hegan ended the season ranked in 19th place in the 1948 American League Most Valuable Player Award voting, due in part to his handling of the Indians' pitching staff which led the league in winning percentage, shutouts and in earned run average.

=== Recognition for handling pitchers ===
Hegan's pitch-calling skills continued to be made evident as, the Indian's pitching staff would lead the American League in earned run average every year from 1948 to 1951. In 1951 and 1952, the Indians' pitching staff would have three 20-game winning pitchers. Cleveland pitchers gave Hegan credit for part of their success.

Cleveland Indian Hall of Fame pitcher Bob Feller was quoted as saying,"He was one of the best defensive catchers in baseball history. Jim called a good game. We disagreed rarely. Jim was very good at keeping pitchers calm."

Another Hall of Fame pitcher, Bob Lemon said of Hegan, "When I first started pitching, I used to shake him off sometimes. Invariably, they'd get a hit. So I stopped shaking him off."

In 1954, Hegan would again lead the Indians' pitching staff to the lowest earned run average in the league and committed only 4 errors in 137 games played as, the Indians won the American League pennant with a then-record 111 victories in a 154-game season. The Indians would eventually lose to the New York Giants in the 1954 World Series. Hegan would once again guide the Indians' pitching staff to the league's lowest earned run average in 1956 as, the Indians boasted three 20-game winning pitchers for the third time during his career.

== Later playing career ==
After the 1957 season, Hegan was traded to the Detroit Tigers. He was traded several more times before ending his playing career with the Chicago Cubs in 1960 at the age of 39.

== Career statistics ==
Hegan would be the Indians starting catcher for 11 seasons from 1946 until 1956. In 1,666 games played, Hegan had a 1,087 hits for a .228 batting average, with 92 home runs and 525 runs batted in. During his career, he led American League catchers three times in putouts, assists, double plays, total chances per game and fielding percentage and, had a career fielding percentage of .990.

At the time of his retirement in 1960, Hegan's .990 career fielding percentage was second only to Buddy Rosar among retired catchers. His 49.77% career caught stealing percentage ranks 16th all-time among major league catchers. Hegan caught 121 shutouts in his career, ranking him 9th all-time among major league catchers. He is the Indians' all-time leader in games played as a catcher with 1,491.

As a testament to Hegan's pitch-calling skills during this period, the Indians' pitching staff was the best in baseball, leading the American League six times in earned run average. Hegan was selected to be an American League All-Star five times during his playing career. During his career, Hegan was the catcher for six 20-game winning pitchers (Bob Feller, Bob Lemon, Gene Bearden, Early Wynn, Mike Garcia, Herb Score), and he caught no hitters by three different pitchers: Don Black (1947), Bob Lemon (1948) and Bob Feller (1951). Moreover, Hegan caught for a record seven different pitchers who would eventually be inducted into the Baseball Hall of Fame.

Despite his considerable defensive skills, because he was a light-hitting player, Hegan is almost a forgotten man in major league baseball history. Yankee Hall of Fame catcher Bill Dickey once said about Hegan's fielding abilities, "If I had been able to catch like Hegan I wouldn't have needed to hit".

== Coaching career ==
He began his coaching career as a playing coach for the Cubs working under former Cleveland teammate Lou Boudreau in 1960. In mid-year, after his active career ended July 4, Hegan became the full-time bullpen coach for the New York Yankees, helping to mentor future catching stand outs Thurman Munson and Rick Dempsey. He served with the Yankees through the 1973 season.

He then moved with manager Ralph Houk to the Detroit Tigers for five years, through 1978. He finished his career in uniform back with the Yankees as a coach (1979–80), and was serving as a scout for the Yankees when he died on June 17, 1984, at the age of 63 in Swampscott, Massachusetts, of a heart attack.

== Personal life ==
Jim Hegan's son, Mike Hegan, was an All-Star first baseman who played major league baseball from 1964 to 1977, and later a sports commentator for both the Milwaukee Brewers and Indians, retiring shortly before his death in 2013.

Mike had two different tenures with the Yankees in the 1960s and 1970s, both times overlapping with Jim's tenure on the Yankee coaching staff.

== See also ==
- List of second-generation Major League Baseball players
