= Steve Kuczek =

American baseball player

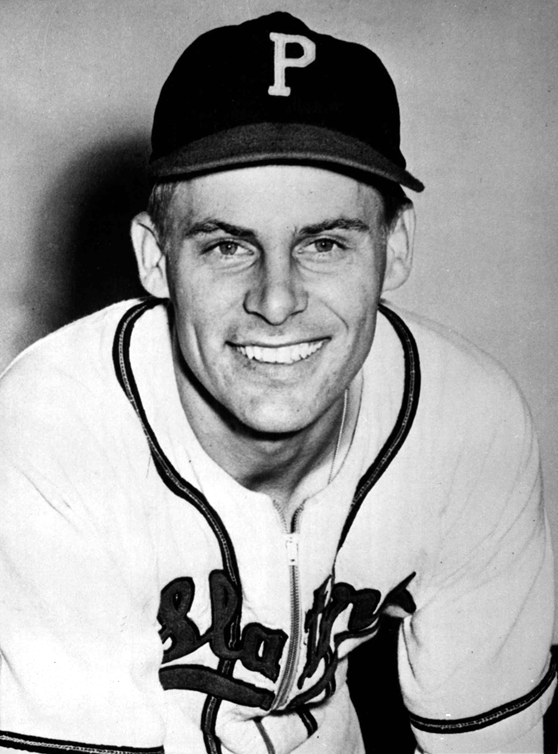
- Steve Kuczek while playing for the Pawtucket Slaters, the class B minor league affiliate of the Boston Braves
- Pinch hitter
- Born: December 28, 1924; Amsterdam, New York, U.S.
- Died: November 21, 2010 (aged 85); Scotia, New York, U.S.
- Batted: Right Threw: Right

MLB debut
- September 29, 1949, for the Boston Braves

Last MLB appearance
- September 29, 1949, for the Boston Braves

MLB statistics
- Batting average: 1.000
- At bats: 1
- Hits: 1
- Stats at Baseball Reference

Teams
- Boston Braves (1949)

Stanislaw Leo "Steve" Kuczek (December 28, 1924 – November 21, 2010) was an American professional baseball player. A late-season callup to the 1949 Boston Braves, he became one of only 84 players in the history of Major League Baseball to sport a career 1.000 batting average. He was born in Amsterdam, New York, and played baseball in high school, as well as at Colgate University and in the United States Army, in which he served during World War II.

On September 29, 1949, in a game against the Brooklyn Dodgers at Braves Field, Kuczek made his first and only appearance in the Major Leagues. In the second game of a doubleheader, rain had soaked the field and darkness was beginning to set in. In the bottom of the fifth inning with the Dodgers leading 8–0, Tommy Holmes stepped into the batter's box, and Connie Ryan entered the on deck circle wearing a raincoat. Unamused by Ryan's protest of the game continuing under such conditions (and the bonfire started on the dugout steps by other members of the Braves), umpire George Barr promptly ejected Ryan. Kuczek was selected to pinch-hit for Ryan, and was likely going to assume Ryan's position at shortstop were the game to continue. Holmes singled off Dodger pitcher Don Newcombe, and Kuczek followed by doubling down the right field line. Newcombe then went on to strike out the next three Braves, and umpire Barr called the now official game in favor of the Dodgers.

Kuczek never appeared in another MLB game, and retired after the completion of the 1950 minor league season. He worked with General Electric after his baseball career ended. He died in Scotia, New York, at the age of 85.
