= Denny Galehouse =

American baseball player (1911–1998)

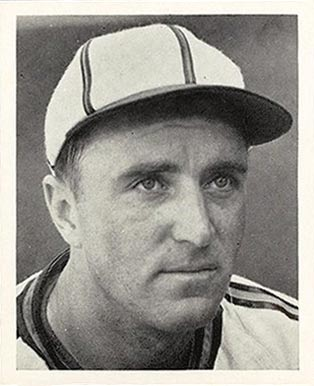
- Galehouse with the St. Louis Browns, circa 1941
- Pitcher
- Born: December 7, 1911; Marshallville, Ohio, U.S.
- Died: December 12, 1998 (aged 87); Doylestown, Ohio, U.S.
- Batted: Right Threw: Right

MLB debut
- April 30, 1934, for the Cleveland Indians

Last MLB appearance
- May 3, 1949, for the Boston Red Sox

MLB statistics
- Win–loss record: 109–118
- Earned run average: 3.97
- Strikeouts: 851
- Stats at Baseball Reference

Teams
- Cleveland Indians (1934–1938); Boston Red Sox (1939–1940); St. Louis Browns (1941–1944, 1946–1947); Boston Red Sox (1947–1949)

Dennis Ward Galehouse (December 7, 1911 – December 12, 1998) was an American Major League Baseball pitcher with the Cleveland Indians, Boston Red Sox and the St. Louis Browns between 1934 and 1949. Galehouse batted and threw right-handed.

== Early life ==
Galehouse was born in Marshallville, Ohio, and grew up in nearby Doylestown. He played semipro baseball in Doylestown. He was 18 years old in 1930 when he entered professional baseball with the Johnstown Johnnies of the Middle Atlantic League. Between 1931 and 1934, he registered double-digit wins, earning a promotion to the major leagues in 1934.

== Career ==
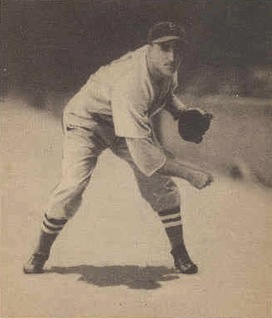
Galehouse in 1940

Galehouse made his major league debut with the Cleveland Indians in 1934, although did not become a regular pitcher until 1936. He remained in Cleveland through the 1938 season. His best seasons came in the 1940s with the St. Louis Browns and Boston Red Sox; he won either 11 or 12 games four times during those years.

He missed the 1945 season due to service in the United States Navy in World War II, at the Great Lakes Naval Training Station, where he was a key fixture on the ball team’s pitching staff and was later discharged on December 15, 1945, returning to the Browns for the 1946 season.

Galehouse led the American League in fewest bases on balls allowed per nine innings pitched (2.482) in 1947, and finished fifth in shutouts in the American League (with three) that season.

In 15 seasons, Galehouse had a 109–118 win–loss record, pitched 375 games (258 starts), 100 complete games, 17 shutouts, 13 saves, 851 strikeouts, and a 3.97 ERA.

Galehouse started a one-game, winner-take-all playoff for the Red Sox against Cleveland on October 4, 1948 to determine who would win the AL pennant. The BoSox lost that game, 8-3, and Cleveland went on to win the World Series that year.

== Later life ==
Galehouse remained in baseball after his playing career as a scout for both the Red Sox and Indians, as well as the Detroit Tigers, St. Louis Cardinals and San Diego Padres. He died in Doylestown at the age of 87 from complications of heart disease.
