= Clint Conatser =

American baseball player (1921–2019)

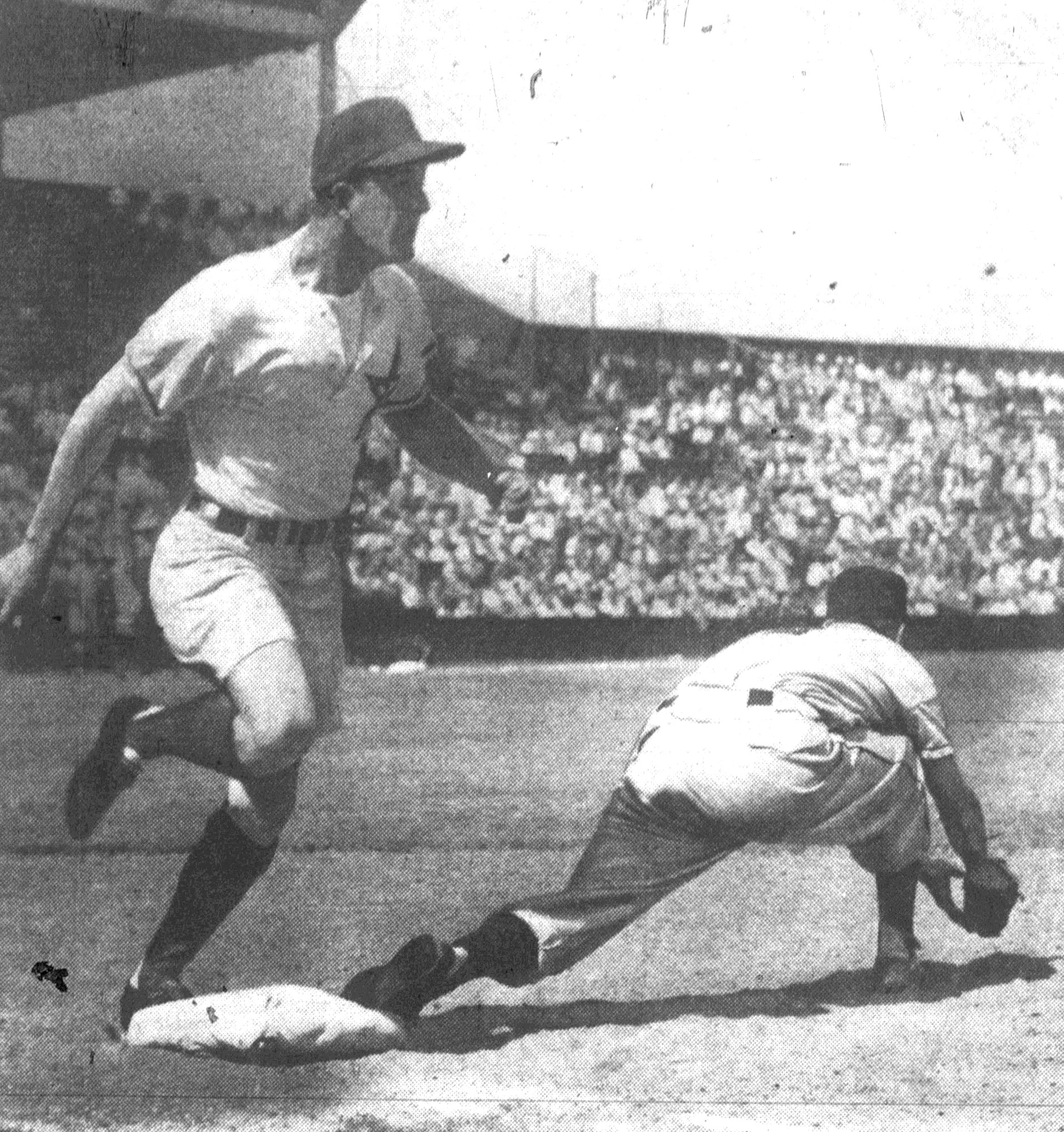
- Conatser (left) during a game on June 3, 1951 at Gilmore Field in Los Angeles, California.
- Outfielder
- Born: July 24, 1921; Los Angeles, California, U.S.
- Died: August 23, 2019 (aged 98); Laguna Hills, California, U.S.
- Batted: Right Threw: Right

MLB debut
- April 21, 1948, for the Boston Braves

Last MLB appearance
- July 14, 1949, for the Boston Braves

MLB statistics
- Batting average: .271
- At bats: 376
- Hits: 102
- Stats at Baseball Reference

Teams
- Boston Braves (1948–1949)

Clinton Astor Conatser (July 24, 1921 – August 23, 2019) was an American professional baseball player. An outfielder, Conatser played 1 1/2 seasons for the Boston Braves of Major League Baseball and was a member of the 1948 Braves, the last Boston-based team to win a National League pennant.

Born in Los Angeles, Conatser stood 5 ft 11 in (1.80 m) tall, weighed 182 lb (83 kg), and threw and batted right-handed. His professional career began in 1939, and he bounced around in the farm systems of the Cleveland Indians and Detroit Tigers before being drafted by the Braves from the Seattle Rainiers of the Pacific Coast League after the 1947 season. He was a member of the Braves for the entire 1948 campaign as a platoon outfielder, batting.277 in 77 games with three home runs and 23 runs batted in. He pinch hit a single in four at bats in the 1948 World Series, which Boston lost to the Indians in six games. Conatser added three more home runs in 1949 and batted.263, but was demoted to the Braves' Milwaukee Brewers Triple-A affiliate in July. All told, he batted.271 in 143 Major League games with six homers and 39 RBI.

Conatser spent the remainder of his playing career at the Triple-A level, retiring after the 1952 Pacific Coast League season. He died on August 23, 2019, in Laguna Hills, California.
