= Jim Russell (baseball) =

American baseball player (1918–1987)

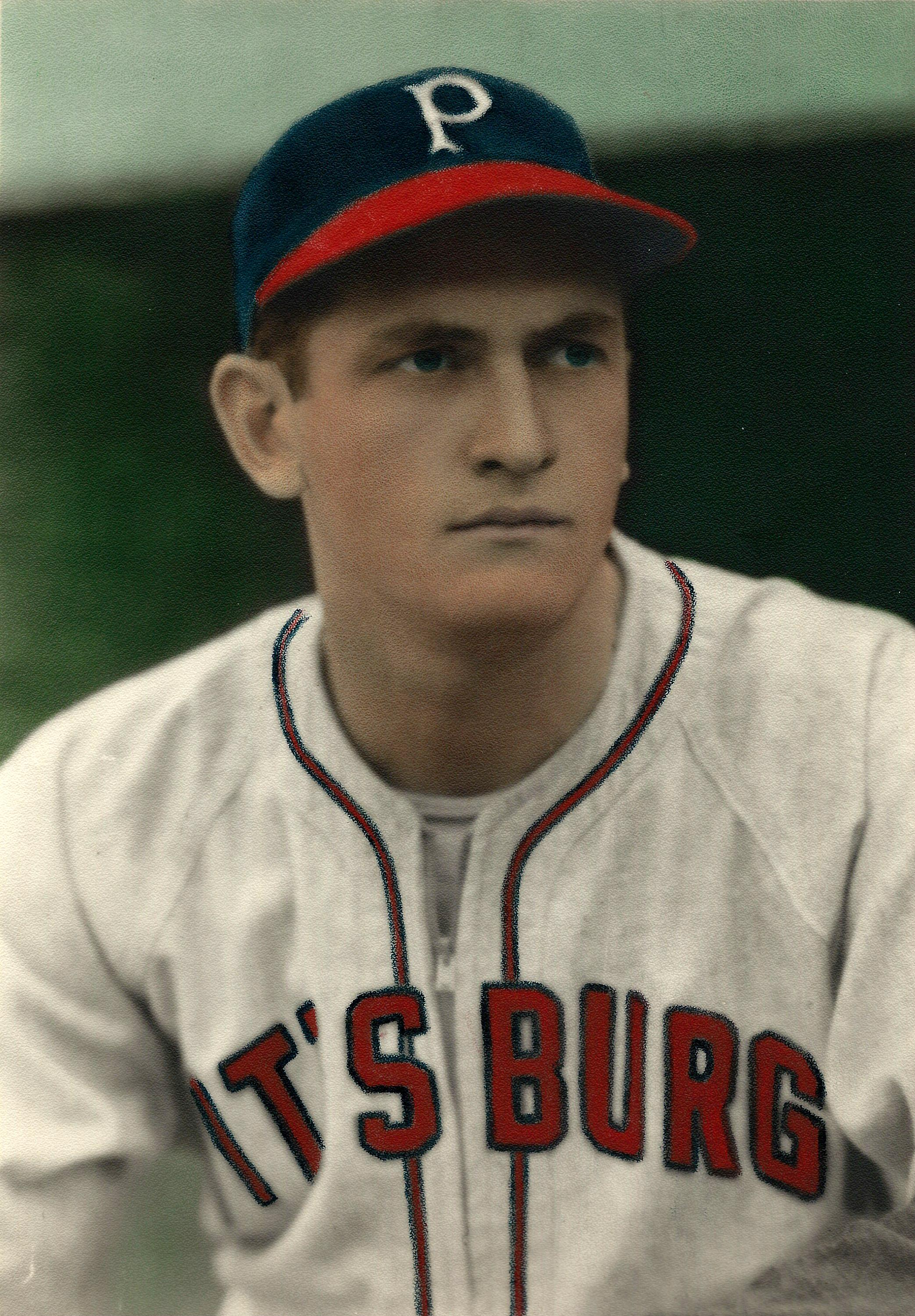
- Outfielder
- Born: October 1, 1918; Fayette City, Pennsylvania, U.S.
- Died: November 24, 1987 (aged 69); Orlando, Florida, U.S.
- Batted: Switch Threw: Right

MLB debut
- September 12, 1942, for the Pittsburgh Pirates

Last MLB appearance
- October 1, 1951, for the Brooklyn Dodgers

MLB statistics
- Batting average: .267
- Home runs: 67
- Runs batted in: 428
- Stats at Baseball Reference

Teams
- Pittsburgh Pirates (1942–1947); Boston Braves (1948–1949); Brooklyn Dodgers (1950–1951)

James William Russell (October 1, 1918 – November 24, 1987) was an American professional baseball outfielder. He played in Major League Baseball (MLB) for the Pittsburgh Pirates, Boston Braves, and Brooklyn Dodgers between 1942 and 1951.

== Background ==
Russell was born in Fayette City, Pennsylvania, on October 1, 1918, the son of James Walch "Doc" Russell and Lillian Johnson. Russell never finished high school, but instead went out to work mines to bolster his family's financial situation. Jim played baseball with rocks (for balls) and tree limbs (for bats) in alleyways when he was a youngster. As a youth, he contracted rheumatic fever twice; his baseball career would be shortened because of his rheumatic heart disease.

== Baseball career ==
Russell, a switch hitter who threw right-handed, stood 6 feet 1 inch (1.85 m) tall and weighed 181 pounds (82 kg) After beginning his minor league career in 1937, his contract was bought by the Pittsburgh Pirates in September 1942. In 1944, Russell led the Pirates in hitting with a .312 batting average and 181 total hits, and hit the first pinch-hit home run in Pirates history on August 20.

Russell was traded in November 1947 to the Boston Braves in a five-player transaction that included Danny Murtaugh, Johnny Hopp and Bill Salkeld. He was the pennant-winning Braves' regular center fielder in 1948, starting 80 of Boston's 98 games played through early August. But then he was stricken with bacterial endocarditis brought on by the rheumatic fever he had as a child. It cost him the rest of the season and a chance to play in the 1948 World Series.

He was able to play again for the Braves in 1949, but the heart problem slowly degraded his ability, as he had a .231 batting average. Russell was claimed on waivers from the Braves after the 1949 season by the Brooklyn Dodgers. He spent the next two seasons shuttling between the parent club and the Dodgers' top farm team in Montreal. In 1952 and 1953, he returned to the minors and finished his playing career with the Portland Beavers of the Pacific Coast League.

As a big-leaguer, Russell appeared in 1,035 games played over his ten-season career and batted .267 with 428 RBI. His 959 hits included 175 doubles, 51 triples and 67 home runs. Defensively, he recorded an overall .981 fielding percentage playing at all three outfield positions and first base.

From 1954 until 1963, he scouted for the Dodgers and Washington Senators.

The first player in Pittsburgh Pirates history to hit a grand slam as a pinch-hitter, Russell was also the first player in Major League Baseball history to homer from both sides of the plate in the same game on two separate occasions, doing so on June 7, 1948 for the Boston Braves and on July 26, 1950 while with the Brooklyn Dodgers. He also had a pair of doubles in the 1948 game for 12 total bases.
