= Jim Britt =

American sportscaster (1910–1980)

- Born: April 11, 1910; San Francisco, California, U.S.
- Died: December 31, 1980 (aged 70); Monterey, California, U.S.
- Education: University of Detroit
- Sports commentary career
- Teams: University of Notre Dame (football, basketball) (1934–1935); Boston Braves (1940–1942, 1946–1952); Boston Red Sox (1940–1942, 1946–1950); Cleveland Indians (1954–1957)
- Genre: Play-by-play

James Joseph Britt (April 11, 1910 – December 31, 1980) was an American sportscaster who broadcast Major League Baseball games in Boston, Massachusetts, and Cleveland, Ohio, during the 1940s and 1950s. On June 15, 1948, Britt was at the microphone on WBZ-TV for the first live telecast of a Major League game in New England, as the Boston Braves defeated the Chicago Cubs, 6–3, at Braves Field.

A native of San Francisco, Britt graduated from the University of Detroit with a degree in English and from the University of Southern California with a law degree and began his broadcasting career in Michigan before taking on play-by-play announcing for the University of Notre Dame's football and basketball teams, then the Buffalo Bisons minor league baseball club. He joined the air staff of Boston's WNAC radio in 1939.

== Boston Braves and Red Sox ==
From 1940 through 1950, with time out for United States Navy service in World War II, Britt was the voice of both the National League Boston Braves (officially the "Bees" from 1936 to 1940) and the American League Boston Red Sox, succeeding Baseball Hall of Fame second baseman and manager Frankie Frisch as play-by-play broadcaster when Frisch returned to uniform as pilot of the 1940 Pittsburgh Pirates. Britt also hosted an evening sports show on WNAC.

At the time, the Braves and Red Sox each broadcast only their home games and shared announcing teams and flagship stations. Because MLB schedules were then arranged so that the two Boston clubs were never home at the same time, there were no schedule conflicts. As such, Britt was the voice of two pennant-winning clubs, the 1946 Red Sox and the 1948 Braves. During the latter year, only the Red Sox' defeat at the hands of the Cleveland Indians in the 1948 American League tie-breaker game on October 4 kept Britt from being the play-by-play voice of both league champions.

At the close of the 1950 season, the teams' co-operative radio arrangement ended and each decided to air a full schedule of 154 games, home and away. Britt chose to stay with the Braves, and the Red Sox were left to look for their own lead announcer.

As fate would have it, the Sox would hire the "second banana" for the New York Yankees — a Mel Allen protégé named Curt Gowdy — who would be the voice of the Red Sox for 15 years before moving on to NBC's Game of the Week and a place in the Baseball Hall of Fame as a Ford C. Frick Award winner. Meanwhile, the Braves' attendance fell disastrously in 1951 and 1952, and the club moved to Milwaukee in March 1953, in the middle of spring training.

== Cleveland Indians and national work ==
Britt did not accompany the Braves to Wisconsin. Instead, he relocated to Cleveland and joined the TV announcing crew of the Indians in 1954, working through 1957 with Ken Coleman, a native of the Boston area (and Gowdy's eventual successor, in 1966, as voice of the Red Sox). The highlight of Britt's Cleveland tenure was the Indians' 1954 American League pennant with their league-record 111–43 season (one game better than the 110–44 1927 Yankees). But the Indians were upset in four straight games by the New York Giants in the ensuing 1954 World Series.

Nationally, Britt participated in the Mutual network radio coverage of the World Series in 1948 and 1950, and worked on NBC's television coverage of the Series in 1949 and 1951. He also announced several baseball All-Star Games in the late 1940s and early '50s, as well as NFL games on the DuMont network and college football coverage (including the 1953 Sugar Bowl game) on ABC.

== Return to Boston ==
Britt returned to Boston in the late 1950s as a newscaster and sportscaster for the city's ABC affiliate, then WHDH-TV, Channel 5. The station also was the flagship of the Red Sox' television network, but Britt never regained his former role announcing for the team. Instead, he initiated a popular candlepin bowling show he would host until 1966, and also hosted Dateline: Boston (a nonsports predecessor to many of the modern-day magazine-style television programs) and an ABC-TV network series of hourlong 18-hole matches between two golfers called All-Star Golf featuring the best of their time including Ben Hogan, Sammy Snead, Lloyd Mangrum and Billy Casper.

In retirement he eventually returned to his native California, where he died, aged 70, in Monterey.
