= 1948 American League tie-breaker game =

1948 Major League Baseball tie-breaker game

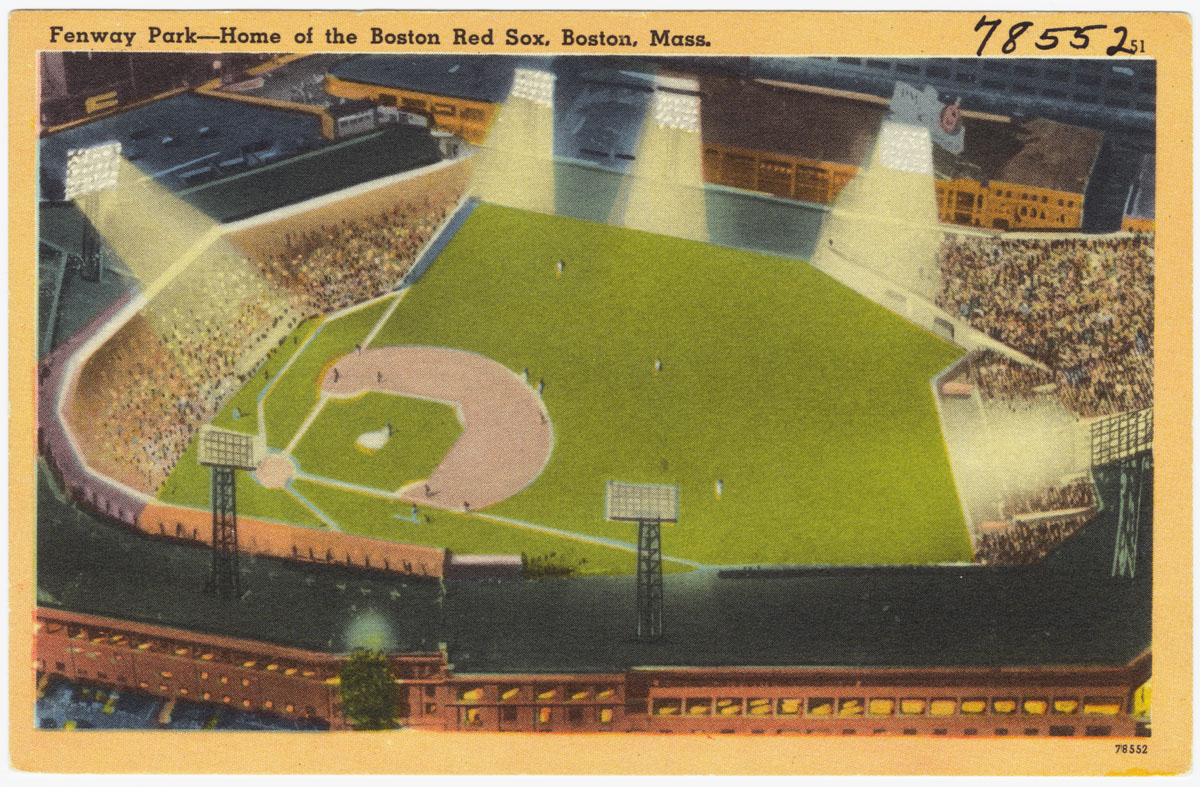
- Fenway Park in Boston, game venue
	1	2	3	4	5	6	7	8	9	R	H	E
Cleveland Indians	1	0	0	4	1	0	0	1	1	8	13	1
Boston Red Sox	1	0	0	0	0	2	0	0	0	3	5	1
- Date: October 4, 1948
- Venue: Fenway Park
- City: Boston, Massachusetts
- Umpires: HP: Bill McGowan; 1B: Bill Summers; 2B: Eddie Rommel; 3B: Charlie Berry
- Attendance: 33,957
- Television: WBZ-TV (BOS)
- Radio: Mutual; WHDH (BOS); WHK (CLE)
- Radio announcers: Mutual: Mel Allen and Jim Britt

The 1948 American League tie-breaker game was a one-game extension to Major League Baseball's (MLB) 1948 regular season, played between the Cleveland Indians and Boston Red Sox to determine the winner of the American League (AL) pennant. The game was played on October 4, 1948, at Fenway Park in Boston, Massachusetts. It was necessary after both teams finished the season with identical win–loss records of 96–58. This was the first-ever one-game playoff in the AL, and the only one before 1969, when the leagues were split into divisions.

The Indians defeated the Red Sox, 8–3, as the Indians scored four runs in the fourth inning and limited the Red Sox to five hits. The Indians advanced to the 1948 World Series, where they defeated the Boston Braves, four games to two, giving them their second and most recent World Series championship. In baseball statistics, the tie-breaker counted as the 155th regular season game by both teams, with all events in the game added to regular season statistics.

== Background ==
The 1948 Major League Baseball season was predicted to be a close race between the Yankees and Red Sox. In a United Press poll conducted just before the season started, the majority of sportswriters chose the Yankees, who had won last year's World Series, to face the Braves or St. Louis Cardinals that year, while others chose the Red Sox; only one sportswriter chose the Indians to reach the World Series. Most of the American League managers had the Yankees finishing first, followed by the Red Sox, Indians, and Detroit Tigers. Tension and confidence was evident between the teams, as two months into the season, after defeating the Red Sox 7–0, Yankees manager Bucky Harris declared that the Yankees would win the pennant, though they were currently at second place at the time.

The pennant race continued between the three teams throughout the entire season. On September 25, after playing 147 games, with seven games left to play, all three teams had a record of 91–56. After each team played four more games, the Indians were up two games, meaning the Yankees and Red Sox had to win their games on September 30 to stay in the pennant race. They did, and the month of October opened up with both teams 1.5 games behind the Indians. The Indians' last series was a three-game stand against the Tigers, while the Red Sox and Yankees had a two-game series against each other.

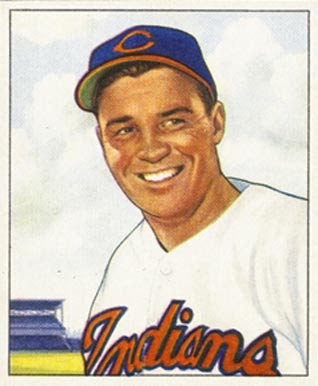
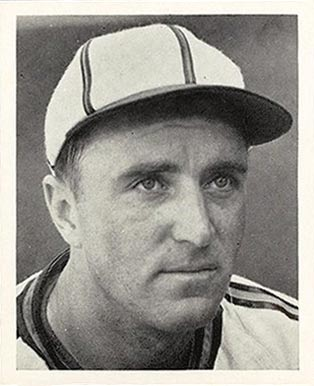
Starting pitchers Gene Bearden of Cleveland (left) and Denny Galehouse of Boston (right)

The Indians lost their first game 5–3 against the Tigers on October 1, giving them a one-game lead with two games left to play. As a result, speculation arose about the possibility of a three-way tie. On October 2, Cleveland beat Detroit to clinch at least a tie, and Boston beat New York 5–1, ending the Yankees' pennant run and bringing the race down to two teams. On the last day of the season, October 3, Boston won their game and Cleveland lost, giving them identical 96–58 records and forcing a tiebreaker the following day at Boston. The home field for the game was decided by a coin toss, held the previous week in Chicago. The Indians chose rookie Gene Bearden to start against Boston in the tie-breaker, despite only having one day of rest, as he had beaten the Red Sox twice that season, and the Red Sox chose Denny Galehouse, passing on Mel Parnell, who had beaten the Indians on three separate occasions that season.

== Game summary ==
Monday, October 4, 1948 1:15 pm (ET) at Fenway Park in Boston, Massachusetts
Team	1	2	3	4	5	6	7	8	9	R	H	E
Cleveland	1	0	0	4	1	0	0	1	1	8	13	1
Boston	1	0	0	0	0	2	0	0	0	3	5	1
WP: Gene Bearden (20–7) LP: Denny Galehouse (8–8); Home runs: CLE: Lou Boudreau 2 (18), Ken Keltner (31); BOS: Bobby Doerr (27); Attendance: 33,957; Notes: Game duration 2 hours and 24 minutes Boxscore

Galehouse started off the game by quickly getting outs from Dale Mitchell and Allie Clark. American League MVP Lou Boudreau then hit a home run off Galehouse to make the score 1–0. After another out, Bearden came on the mound in the bottom of the first. Johnny Pesky doubled, then scored on a hit by Vern Stephens to make the score 1–1 at the end of the first inning. Both pitchers allowed one baserunner the following inning; Ken Keltner reached base for Cleveland and Birdie Tebbetts reached base for the Red Sox. Both pitchers then got three quick outs in the third inning.

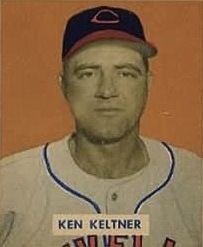
Ken Keltner

In the fourth inning, the Indians opened up the game. Boudreau and Joe Gordon hit back-to-back singles, which brought Keltner to the plate. The Red Sox expected a bunt, but instead the third baseman hit his 31st home run of the season to put the Indians ahead, 4–1. Galehouse was then replaced with Ellis Kinder, who was met with a double by Larry Doby. Kinder responded by getting the next three batters out, which brought the score to 5–1 as Doby also scored. After Bearden got three Red Sox out, the Indians started the fifth inning with the top of their lineup. Mitchell and Eddie Robinson, who came in for Clark, were out. Boudreau then hit his second home run of the night to make the score 6–1.

The rest of the fifth inning saw no more hits, and after a Keltner double, three Indians were out in the top of the sixth inning. The Red Sox began to fight back in the bottom of the sixth inning. With one out, Ted Williams reached first base on an error by Gordon. Stephens struck out, but Bobby Doerr hit his 27th home run of the season to make the score 6–3. No runs were scored in the seventh inning, though Bearden and Mitchell both reached base. The Indians were able to score another run in the eighth inning after Jim Hegan was intentionally walked. Bearden then hit a fly ball to Williams, who dropped it, allowing Hegan to score and making it 7–3 in the Indians' favor. The Indians were able to score one more run in the ninth when Robinson scored after Keltner grounded into a bases-loaded double play. Bearden got the final three Red Sox out in the bottom of the ninth, finishing the game with an 8–3 Indians victory and giving Bearden a complete game.

== Aftermath ==
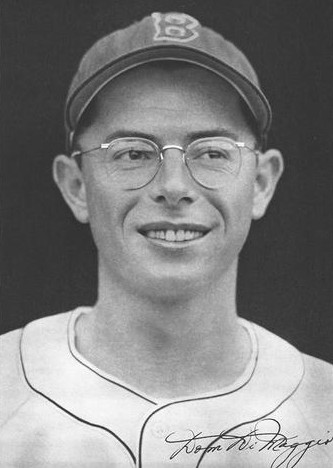
Dom DiMaggio

The Indians received their first playoff berth since the 1920 World Series. Indians' Manager Lou Boudreau dedicated the victory to pitcher Don Black, who suffered a cerebral hemorrhage the previous month. The Indians went on to face the Boston Braves in the 1948 World Series, winning it four games to two. The Red Sox fans experienced disappointment when Boston mayor James Michael Curley ordered the fire department sirens sounded when Boston won the pennant. The sirens did sound, but it was instead for a fire in the Boston Navy Yard.

The Red Sox's defeat disappointed Boston fans, who had been rooting the entire season for an All-Boston World Series. Before the October 4 game, the oddsmakers gave the Red Sox the advantage, meaning that an all-Boston World Series was likely. The Red Sox did not make another playoff appearance until 1967, when the St. Louis Cardinals defeated them in the 1967 World Series.

The game counted as a regular season game in baseball statistics. As a result, Dom DiMaggio and Vern Stephens led the league with 155 games played, which could not have been equaled except by another Red Sox or Indians player. DiMaggio's four at-bats in the game also gave him the league lead with 648, four ahead of Bob Dillinger of the St. Louis Browns. Dale Mitchell's one single also gave him the league lead in that statistics, beating out Dillinger by one. Gene Bearden's nine inning, one earned run performance brought his earned run average (ERA) down to 2.43, which led the American League. Boudreau finished the season with a .355 batting average, 116 runs, 18 home runs, and 106 runs batted in, and won the Major League Baseball Most Valuable Player Award at the end of the season.
