= Bob Keely =

American baseball player (1909–2001)

- Catcher
- Born: August 22, 1909; St. Louis, Missouri, U.S.
- Died: May 20, 2001 (aged 91); Sarasota, Florida, U.S.
- Batted: Right Threw: Right

MLB debut
- July 25, 1944, for the St. Louis Cardinals

Last MLB appearance
- September 29, 1945, for the St. Louis Cardinals

MLB statistics
- Games played: 2
- At bats: 1
- Hits: 0
- Stats at Baseball Reference

Teams
- As player: St. Louis Cardinals (1944–1945); As coach: Boston / Milwaukee Braves (1946–1957)

Career highlights and awards
- World Series champion (1957)

Robert William Keely (August 22, 1909 – May 20, 2001) was an American professional baseball coach and scout, and, for one full season and parts of two others, a player. He served as a coach in Major League Baseball for 12 seasons (1946–1957) with the Boston / Milwaukee Braves.

Born in St. Louis, Missouri, Keely stood 6' (183 cm) tall, weighed 175 pounds (79 kg), and threw and batted right-handed. Keely played one season of minor league baseball, 1937, with the Union City Greyhounds of the Class D KITTY League, but was a longtime semiprofessional catcher with the Belleville Stags. During World War II, he joined the St. Louis Cardinals as the club's bullpen catcher — an extra hand who caught relief pitchers and batting practice. He was activated for one game in 1944 and one game in 1945, going hitless in one at bat and handling two chances as a catcher without an error.

Keely formally became a major-league coach when he joined manager Billy Southworth in moving from the Cardinals to the Braves in 1946. He was the Braves' bullpen coach through the 1957 season, serving in both Boston and Milwaukee and under four different managers. He worked on the 1948 NL champions and the 1957 world champions with the club.

After leaving the Braves, Keely was a scout for the Cardinals through the mid-1970s. He died at age 91 in Sarasota, Florida.
