= Bill Salkeld =

American baseball player (1917–1967)

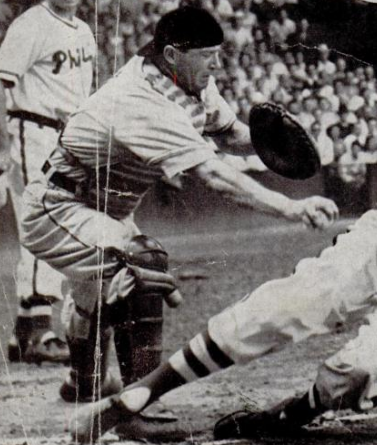
- Catcher
- Born: March 8, 1917; Pocatello, Idaho, U.S.
- Died: April 22, 1967 (aged 50); Los Angeles, California, U.S.
- Batted: Left Threw: Right

MLB debut
- April 18, 1945, for the Pittsburgh Pirates

Last MLB appearance
- April 21, 1950, for the Chicago White Sox

MLB statistics
- Batting average: .273
- Home runs: 31
- Runs batted in: 132
- Stats at Baseball Reference

Teams
- Pittsburgh Pirates (1945–1947); Boston Braves (1948–1949); Chicago White Sox (1950)

William Franklin Salkeld (March 8, 1917 – April 22, 1967) was an American professional baseball player, a catcher in the Major Leagues from 1945–50 for the Pittsburgh Pirates, Boston Braves and Chicago White Sox. A native of Pocatello, Idaho, who grew up in Sacramento, California, Salkeld batted left-handed, threw right-handed, stood 5 feet 10 inches (1.78 m) tall and weighed 190 pounds (86 kg).

== Early years ==
Salkeld's professional career was almost ended at the age of 19 by a serious knee injury that caused him to miss 2 1/2 seasons. He was able to return to baseball as the 22-year-old player-manager of the 1939 Tucson Cowboys of the Class D Arizona–Texas League. He then spent 1940–44 in the top-level Pacific Coast League.

== Major league career ==
Salkeld made his Major League debut at age 28 with the 1945 Pirates during the final year of the World War II manpower shortage. As a rookie, Salkeld batted .311 with 15 home runs in only 317 plate appearances and finished 24th in the National League Most Valuable Player voting. Although his productivity declined during the postwar period as ex-Major Leaguers returned to the game from military service, Salkeld kept his Major League foothold for most of the next four seasons.

Traded to the Boston Braves after the 1947 campaign, Salkeld platooned with right-handed hitter Phil Masi in 1948 as the Braves stormed to their first National League championship in 34 years. Salkeld then appeared in five games of the 1948 World Series against the Cleveland Indians. In 15 plate appearances, he collected two hits and five walks plus one sacrifice hit for an on-base percentage of .500. Salkeld's solo home run off future Hall of Famer Bob Feller in the sixth inning of Game 5 tied the contest at five; the following inning, Boston scored six runs to salt away an 11–5 victory (although Cleveland prevailed in the Series, four games to two). In 1949, he batted .255 in 66 games for Boston, with five home runs and 25 RBIs.

Salkeld played a single game for the Chicago White Sox in April 1950, then spent the remainder of the season with the Seattle Rainiers of the Pacific Coast League.

In six seasons, Salkeld batted .273 (232-for-850) with 111 runs, 31 home runs and 132 RBI. On August 4, 1945, he hit for the cycle.

== Later years ==
After leaving baseball after the 1953 minor league season, Salkeld settled in the San Fernando Valley area of Los Angeles, where he had worked in the motion picture industry during off-seasons. He died from cancer at the age of 50 in 1967 and was buried at the Forest Lawn Cemetery in the Hollywood Hills area of Los Angeles. Four years later, his grandson Roger was born in Burbank, California. Roger Salkeld would be chosen by the Seattle Mariners in the first round of the 1989 Major League Baseball draft, and appear in 45 MLB games as a right-handed pitcher for the Mariners and Cincinnati Reds during the mid-1990s.

== See also ==
- List of Major League Baseball players to hit for the cycle

Achievements
Preceded by Bob Elliott	Hitting for the cycle August 4, 1945	Succeeded by Mickey Vernon
