= Bob Elliott (baseball) =

American baseball player, coach, and manager (1916–1966)

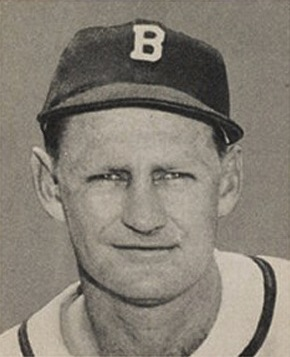
- Elliott with the Boston Braves in 1948
- Third baseman / Outfielder / Manager
- Born: November 26, 1916; San Francisco, California, U.S.
- Died: May 4, 1966 (aged 49); San Diego, California, U.S.
- Batted: Right Threw: Right

MLB debut
- September 2, 1939, for the Pittsburgh Pirates

Last MLB appearance
- September 16, 1953, for the Chicago White Sox

MLB statistics
- Batting average: .289
- Hits: 2,061
- Home runs: 170
- Runs batted in: 1,195
- Stats at Baseball Reference
- Managerial record at Baseball Reference

Teams
- As player: Pittsburgh Pirates (1939–1946); Boston Braves (1947–1951); New York Giants (1952); St. Louis Browns (1953); Chicago White Sox (1953); As manager: Kansas City Athletics (1960)

Career highlights and awards
- 7× All-Star (1941, 1942, 1944, 1945, 1947, 1948, 1951); NL MVP (1947)

Robert Irving Elliott (November 26, 1916 – May 4, 1966) was an American third baseman and right fielder in Major League Baseball who played most of his career with the Pittsburgh Pirates and Boston Braves. He also briefly managed and coached in the Majors. Born in San Francisco, California, the right-handed batting and throwing Elliott stood 6 feet (1.8 m) tall and weighed 185 pounds (84 kg).

Elliott contributed some of the happiest memories to the Braves' final Boston years, winning the 1947 National League Most Valuable Player Award and earning the nickname "Mr. Team." The following season, his power hitting helped lift Boston to its second National League pennant of the 20th century, the team's first in 34 years, and last before relocating to Milwaukee. He was the second Major League third baseman to have five seasons of 100 runs batted in, joining Pie Traynor, and retired with the highest career slugging percentage (.440) of any NL third baseman. He also led the National League in assists three times and in putouts and double plays twice each, and ended his career among the NL leaders in games (8th, 1262), assists (7th, 2547), total chances (10th, 4113) and double plays (4th, 231) at third base. He had the second most hits (1,563) in the 1940s and the most for all National League players.

== Early career with Pirates ==
Raised in El Centro, California, he attended El Centro Junior College and signed with the Pirates in 1936. Elliott came to the Major Leagues as an outfielder in 1939. As a right-handed batter, his power hitting was hampered by the spacious left field at Forbes Field, but in eight years with the team he compiled more than 100 RBI three times, and he batted .315 in 1943. Manager Frankie Frisch shifted him to third base after the 1941 season, seeking to take advantage of his strong arm while compensating for his lack of speed. Exempted from World War II military service due to head injuries from being hit by a batted ball in 1943, Elliott was named to the NL All-Star team in 1941, 1942, 1944 and 1945, and finished among the top ten players in the MVP voting from 1942 through 1944, placing second in the league in RBI the last two years.

On July 15, 1945, he hit for the cycle. After the 1946 season, he was traded to the Braves in a lopsided deal for 37-year-old second baseman Billy Herman, a future member of the Baseball Hall of Fame who was named Pittsburgh's playing manager for 1947. But Herman was aghast at the price — Elliott — the Pirates had paid for him. "Why, they've gone and traded the whole team on me", he said. Herman played only 15 more Major League games and the other three players made a total of 127 appearances with the Pirates.

== Boston's "Mr. Team" ==
With a friendlier hitting environment at Braves Field, Elliott exceeded the 20 home run mark three times in his five years in Boston, equalling Whitey Kurowski for the most 20-HR seasons by an NL third baseman. In his 1947 MVP campaign, Elliott did not lead the NL in any offensive category; however, he batted .317 (second in the NL), with 22 home runs and 113 runs batted in, all team highs. In 1948, when the Braves won the pennant, Elliott batted .283 with 23 homers and 100 RBI and made his sixth All-Star team. He also led the Major Leagues with 131 walks, breaking the club record of 110 set by Billy Hamilton in 1896; it remains the franchise record. Batting cleanup, he hit .333 in the 1948 World Series, which Boston lost in six games to the Cleveland Indians; he had a pair of home runs in his first two at bats in Game 5, an 11–5 victory, and was 3 for 3 with a walk in the final 4–3 loss in Game 6.

Although his numbers declined somewhat thereafter, Elliott enjoyed productive years from 1949 through 1951, including a season batting .305 with 24 home runs and 107 RBI in 1950, his sixth 100-RBI campaign. He was named to his last All-Star squad in 1951, his final year with Boston. By the early 1950s he had broken Kurowski's NL record for career home runs at third base, though Eddie Mathews surpassed him within a few seasons.

== Late playing career ==
Elliott's playing career began to wind down in 1952, as he struggled with the New York Giants following an April trade, and ended after a 1953 campaign split between the St. Louis Browns and Chicago White Sox. Over 15 years (1939–53) and 1,978 games, Elliott batted .289 and collected 2,061 hits, 170 home runs, 382 doubles, 94 triples, 1,064 runs, 967 bases on balls and 1,195 RBI. Elliott's last highlight was two home runs on opening night for the Giants in 1952, both off Baseball Hall of Fame pitcher Robin Roberts. His final Major League game occurred on September 16, 1953, for the White Sox.

Elliott then returned to California in 1954 and played for his hometown team, the San Diego Padres of the Pacific Coast League, for the second half of the season. He hit two home runs and drove in five runs in the final game of the year, helping the Padres to win the pennant for the first time since 1937, the team's second year in the PCL (when they were led by 19-year-old San Diegan star Ted Williams).

== Manager and coach ==
He became the Padres' manager in 1955 and managed them through the first 35 games of the 1957 season. He also managed the Sacramento Solons of the Pacific Coast League in 1959. After a third-place finish in Sacramento, Elliott received his only Major League managing opportunity when he took over the Kansas City Athletics for the 1960 season. But the Athletics were one of the weakest teams in the American League, and the team's owner, Arnold Johnson, died suddenly just before the season began. The A's won only 58 games while losing 96 (.377) in Elliott's only season at the helm, finishing in last place. He was fired by new owner Charles O. Finley at season's end, and replaced by Joe Gordon. In 1961, Elliott was a coach for the expansion Los Angeles Angels during their maiden AL campaign.

Less than five years later, Elliott died at age 49 in San Diego after suffering a ruptured vein in his windpipe. He was survived by his wife, Skippy, two daughters, Judy Gale and Cheryl Townsend, and grandchildren Daren Klum, Chris Townsend and Bob Townsend. Elliott is buried at Greenwood Memorial Park in San Diego.

Elliott was posthumously inducted into both the San Diego Hall of Champions (1967) and the Boston Braves Hall of Fame (1997).

== See also ==
- List of Major League Baseball career hits leaders
- List of Major League Baseball career runs scored leaders
- List of Major League Baseball career runs batted in leaders
- List of Major League Baseball players to hit for the cycle

Achievements
Preceded by Dixie Walker	Hitting for the cycle July 15, 1945	Succeeded by Bill Salkeld

Preceded by Lefty O'Doul	San Diego Padres (PCL) manager 1955–1957	Succeeded by Catfish Metkovich
Preceded by Sibby Sisti	Sacramento Solons manager 1959	Succeeded by Ernie White
Preceded by Franchise established	Los Angeles Angels first base coach 1961	Succeeded by Del Rice
