= Bill Voiselle =

American baseball player (1919–2005)

- Pitcher
- Born: January 29, 1919; Greenwood, South Carolina, U.S.
- Died: January 31, 2005 (aged 86); Greenwood, South Carolina, U.S.
- Batted: Right Threw: Right

MLB debut
- September 1, 1942, for the New York Giants

Last MLB appearance
- July 8, 1950, for the Chicago Cubs

MLB statistics
- Win–loss record: 74–84
- Earned run average: 3.83
- Strikeouts: 645
- Stats at Baseball Reference

Teams
- New York Giants (1942–1947); Boston Braves (1947–1949); Chicago Cubs (1950)

Career highlights and awards
- All-Star (1944); NL strikeout leader (1944)

William Symmes Voiselle (January 29, 1919 – January 31, 2005) was a starting pitcher in Major League Baseball. From 1942 through 1950, Voiselle played for the New York Giants (1942–47), Boston Braves (1947–49) and Chicago Cubs (1950). He batted and threw right-handed.

== Biography ==
Voiselle was born in Greenwood, South Carolina, but grew up in the nearby town of Ninety Six. He received special permission from Commissioner Happy Chandler to wear the number 96 on his jersey as a way to honor his hometown. At the time (and until the 1990s) this was the highest number ever worn in major league baseball.

Voiselle debuted with the Giants in 1942 and reached the big leagues full-time in 1944. Nicknamed "Big Bill", in his rookie season, he led the NL in innings pitched and strikeouts, and finished third with a career-high 21 wins. He made his only All-Star appearance that season and finished fifth in MVP voting. To top it off, The Sporting News named him the National League Pitcher of the Year in the first season of the award.

Voiselle suffered a minor sophomore jinx in 1945, winning 14 but with a high 4.49 ERA. After many prominent major leaguers returned from World War II, his role with the Giants was reduced. He also was on the end of a $500 fine from Giants manager Mel Ott for allowing St. Louis Cardinals batter Johnny Hopp to get a hit on an 0-2 count during a June 1 game at Sportsman's Park.

Voiselle was eventually traded to the Boston Braves for another wartime star, Mort Cooper, in the 1947 midseason. In 1948, Voiselle won 13 games for the Braves Champions Team as the third starter behind Warren Spahn and Johnny Sain. In the World Series against the Cleveland Indians, Voiselle came into Game 3 as a relief pitcher and he got the start in Game 6, taking the loss, 4–3. Most concede that Voiselle and the Braves out-pitched and out-hit the Indians, but the team was eliminated 4–2. Voiselle pitched 10.2 innings in the Series and surrendered three earned runs for a 2.53 ERA. After that, he pitched one more season with the Braves, winning just seven games, before being traded before the 1950 season to the Chicago Cubs for infielder Gene Mauch. Voiselle only spent a half a season with the Cubs, during which he failed to record a victory in 19 appearances (seven starts). It would end up being his last year in the majors, though he continued pitching for a significant number of minor league clubs.

In a nine-season career, Voiselle posted a 74–84 record with 645 strikeouts and a 3.83 ERA in 1373 1/3 innings.

Voiselle died in Greenwood, South Carolina, just two days after his 86th birthday.

== See also ==
- List of Major League Baseball annual strikeout leaders
- Sporting News Pitcher of the Year Award
