= Jeff Heath =

American baseball player (1915–1975)

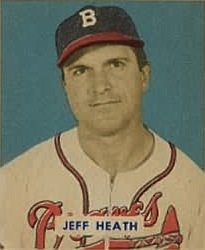
- Heath's 1949 Bowman Gum baseball card
- Left fielder
- Born: April 1, 1915; Fort William, Ontario, Canada
- Died: December 9, 1975 (aged 60); Seattle, Washington, U.S.
- Batted: Left Threw: Right

MLB debut
- September 13, 1936, for the Cleveland Indians

Last MLB appearance
- September 8, 1949, for the Boston Braves

MLB statistics
- Batting average: .293
- Home runs: 194
- Runs batted in: 887
- Stats at Baseball Reference

Teams
- Cleveland Indians (1936–1945); Washington Senators (1946); St. Louis Browns (1946–1947); Boston Braves (1948–1949)

Career highlights and awards
- 2× All-Star (1941, 1943)

Member of the Canadian

Baseball Hall of Fame
- Induction: 1988

John Geoffrey Heath (April 1, 1915^{[a]} – December 9, 1975) was a Canadian-born American left fielder in Major League Baseball (MLB) who played most of his career for the Cleveland Indians.

He was one of the American League's most promising power hitters of the late 1930s and early 1940s, twice led the AL in triples, and batted at least .340 with over 100 runs batted in (RBIs) each time. In 1941 he was selected to his first All-Star Game and that same season became the first player from the American League to become a member of the 20–20–20 club when he hit 20 each of doubles, triples and home runs in the same season. His other All-Star Game selections were in 1943 and 1945.

Heath played for the Washington Senators and St. Louis Browns during the 1946 season and the National League's (NL) Boston Braves beginning in 1948. He incurred a compound fracture to his ankle in late September 1948 in a game in Brooklyn shortly after Boston had clinched the pennant. Subsequently, the Braves were without their starting left fielder for the 1948 World Series. In 1949, Heath's last season in the majors, sportswriter Franklin Lewis wrote, "There was the inimitable Heath who...should have been one of the greatest players in history. But there were no valves on his temper. He grinned in the manner of a schoolboy or he snarled with the viciousness of a tiger."

== Early life ==
Heath was born April 1, 1915, in Fort William, Ontario. His family moved to Victoria, British Columbia before settling in Seattle, Washington. He attended Garfield High School in Seattle where he played baseball and football. As a freshman, he made the varsity baseball squad. Heath was a multi-sport athlete and was offered scholarships from various schools to play American football. University of Washington head coach Jimmy Phelan said Heath was the best fullback in the country. Heath chose a future in baseball, however, and in 1935, he signed with the Yakima Bears of the semipro Northwest League, where he hit .390. He was selected as an All-American amateur team member, managed by Les Mann and played games in Japan. For the tour his batting average was .483. Heath faced difficulties being allowed re-entry upon the team's arrival to the U.S. and became a naturalized U.S. citizen.

Cleveland Indians scout Willie Kamm helped sign Heath to a contract with the organization in 1936. Kamm said, "If this kid isn't a big leaguer I've wasted a lot of time learning baseball." He reported to spring training with the New Orleans Pelicans of the Southern Association. One of his hands became infected and the Indians moved him to their Class C Mid-Atlantic team, the Zanesville Greys. With the Greys, he hit league-bests with 187 RBIs and a .383 average, while his 28 home runs were second-most. He was called up to join the Indians before the 1936 season ended.

== Cleveland Indians ==
Heath batted left-handed and threw right-handed and was listed as 5 feet 11 inches (1.80 m) tall and 200 pounds (91 kg) (14 stone, 4). He broke in with the Indians in 1936 at the age of 21, appeared in 12 games with the club and recorded a .341 batting average and seven extra-base hits. During spring training leading up to the 1937 season, Heath was describing as getting "as much attention as the backline of a Broadway chorus." He appeared in 20 games and hit .230 for the season. During spring training before the 1938 season, Indians manager Oscar Vitt said Heath was "the best natural hitter I've seen since Joe Jackson." One columnist described Vitt's decision to employ Heath:

"Vitt finally decided to use Jeff Heath, the chap with the bulging muscles, in his left pasture. There are few better hitters in the American league than the husky from Washington. Jeff is not the most graceful ballhawk in captivity and he may toss to the wrong base, but put a bat in his hands and the opposition's pitcher will tremble."

In his first full season in 1938, he batted .343 – behind only batting champion Jimmie Foxx's .349 – while leading the league with 18 triples. Upon the conclusion of the season, Heath joined fellow American League (AL) players, and Indians teammate Bob Feller, in exhibition games played around the country (also known as barnstorming), mostly in cities which did not have a major league team. He had 21 home runs and 112 RBIs, collected 58 hits in August alone, and was among the league leaders in slugging average and total bases for the 1938 season. In January 1939, he married Theabelle Callard. He finished with a .292 batting average in 1939. The season also included a late-season punch to a fan from Heath during a home game in Cleveland. "It was just another blunder in a bad season that has been full of mistakes", Heath said of the incident. Before the 1940 season, Heath said, "I'm going to show 'em I'm no flash in the pan. Last year I was overswinging and taking my eye of the ball. I'm not going to do that this season." During the season, Heath was one of 12 reported players who presented a list of grievances against Vitt to Indians President Alva Bradley. Bradley called a meeting with the players and by the end of it, a statement of support from the players for Vitt was released. Twenty-one Indians signed the document, while Heath was one of four who did not, as he was one of two in the hospital at the time of the meeting. Instances between Vitt and his players, including Heath, continued past June, however. Heath was suspended by Vitt after a game in August after the two exchanged words following a strikeout by Heath, who was put in the game as a pinch-hitter. Indians Vice President C.C. Slapnicka withdrew the suspension. The Indians finished the regular season with an 89–65 record in Vitt's last season as manager and Heath a career-low .219 average. The Indians lost the AL pennant by one game to the Detroit Tigers and Heath received much of the blame, although Vitt was released as the team's manager and replaced by Roger Peckinpaugh.

Peckinpaugh announced in December 1940 Heath would remain a starting outfielder with the club. Heath came back in 1941 with a season campaign in which he again led the AL with 20 triples, batted .340 (fourth in the league), and was third in slugging behind Ted Williams and Joe DiMaggio. He also finished second in total bases and RBIs (behind DiMaggio) as well as second in hits, made his first All-Star team, and finished eighth in the Most Valuable Player award voting. He became the first AL player to make the 20-20-20 club, having recorded 20 doubles, triples and home runs in one season. In 1941, Heath became the first player in American League history to record a 20-20-20 season. Heath had 32 doubles, 20 triples, and 24 home runs. This feat would not be equaled until George Brett accomplished the feat in 1979.

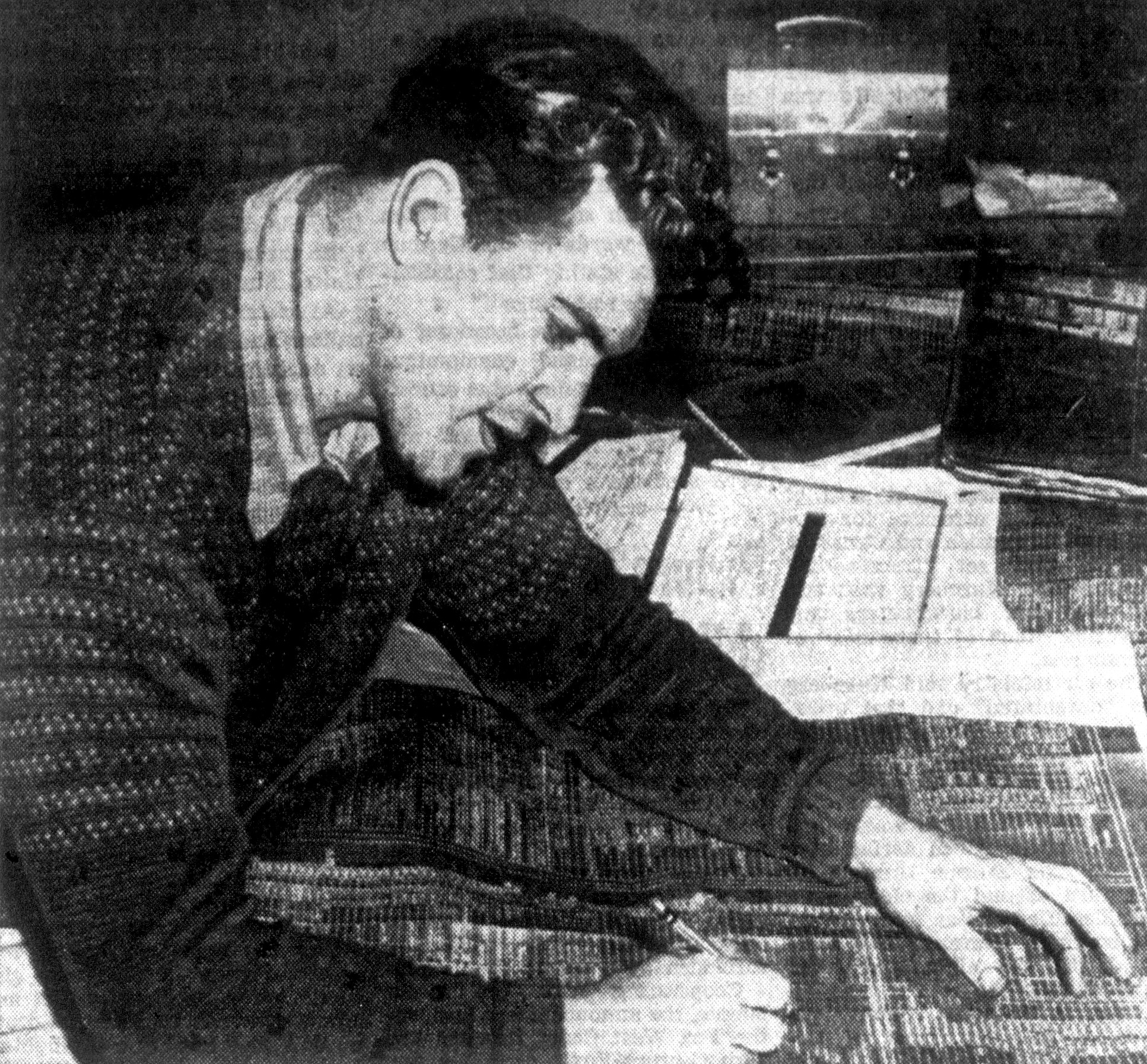
Heath in 1943 as a draftsman for the Seattle-Tacoma Shipbuilding Corporation.

Heath worked as a draftsman for Seattle-Tacoma Shipbuilding Corporation during the off-season leading up to 1943. In years previous, Heath had been described as "lazy" and "lacking aggressiveness" but the 1943 season appeared to be different, including investing extra time in batting practice. He was selected for the All-Star Game and finished fourth in the AL in home runs with 18. Heath was rejected in 1944 for military duty due to knee problems. During the 1944 season Heath was mainly used as a pinch-hitter. In the off-season he underwent knee surgery and entered a contract dispute with the Indians. He did not join the team until June of the 1945 season after a two-month holdout. Despite missing the beginning part of the season, he was still named an All-Star although the game was not played due to travel restrictions during World War II. He finished the season with a batting average of .305 and his 15 home runs were fifth in the AL. In 1943 he became the second player born outside the U.S. to hit 100 home runs, and he surpassed George Selkirk with his 109th home run in 1945.

Heath, who had acquired the nickname "Lord Jeff", was called a "problem child" by Indian player-manager Lou Boudreau. Peckinpaugh once said that Heath "could have been one of the greatest players. He had the ability to do about anything. He could run, he could throw, and he could hit. But he just had no hustle, no nothing. If a ball went by him, he just might walk after it." In December 1945 the Indians traded Heath to the Washington Senators where he started in right field.

== Washington Senators and St. Louis Browns ==
In 1946, Senators' President Clark Griffith agreed to send outfielder George Case to Cleveland in exchange for Heath. Of the trade, Griffith said, "We've sacrificed plenty of speed for a man of tremendous hitting power." During spring training, the addition of Heath led to the Senators being described as a "dark horse." The Associated Press continued:

"Heath's performance may be the key to the Senators' fate. The husky Canadian is the kind of slugger Washington was crying for last fall. He can break up a ball game with one mighty swish of his bat but, to put it mildly, there always has been an uncertain quality about him. Big Jeff was dissatisfied in Cleveland, didn't like the ballpark, didn't like the management, didn't like anything. Still, he has been a most valuable hitter, perhaps one of the best in the game when he is settled down to business."

But Heath would appear in just 48 games with the Senators. He finished with the team hitting .283 with four home runs and 27 RBIs, his last game on June 15 before he was traded to the St. Louis Browns in mid-June for Al LaMacchia and Joe Grace. In his first game with the Browns on June 17 he went 1-for-3 with one RBI. The Browns, who were 23–32 at the time Heath joined the club, finished the 1946 season 66–88. Heath finished with 12 home runs and 57 RBIs in 86 games with the Browns.

Again, the Heath tendency for resentment and trouble led to the Browns trade. Washington had a utility infielder, Sherry Robertson, who was the nephew of owner Clark Griffith. During games, Heath would ride Robertson on the bench, calling him "owner's pet", in reference to the possibility that Robertson was only on the team due to that relationship, and the possibility that Robertson was better paid than Heath. This was the subject of a column in the Washington Post after Heath was gone by longtime sports writer Shirley Povich, who hated to see the Heath bat leave Washington.

The Browns were the second team in the AL to add black players to their roster after the Indians signed Larry Doby in July 1947. Willard Brown and Hank Thompson were teammates of Heath's during the 1947 season, but Heath was described as committing a "petulant display of prejudice" towards Brown after Brown hit a home run with one of Heath's old bats. Brown preferred to use a heavy bat and did not bring his own after being told by the Browns the team would supply him with bats. Brown found one of Heath's damaged bats and applied tape to the affix the knob to the end of the bat. When he tried to use the bat during a game, the umpire told him he could not use the bat with tape applied, so Brown discarded the loose fragments of the bat and proceeded to hit a home run during the at-bat. When he returned to the dugout, however, Heath destroyed the bat when he hit it against the dugout wall.

Heath had a career-high 27 home runs during the 1947 season, but the Browns finished in eighth and last place in the AL. In the Browns' final game, Heath was already in the clubhouse showers when it was his turn to bat in the ninth inning. Upon the conclusion of the season, Browns management was looking to overhaul the team roster. Browns General Manager Bill DeWitt tried to shop Heath to a National League team rather than leave him in the AL. On December 4 it was announced the Boston Braves of the National League had acquired Heath.

== Boston Braves ==
Unlike the Browns, the Braves were contenders all the way to the end of the 1948 season. In a game against the Philadelphia Phillies on September 3, and with the Braves tied for the NL lead, Heath hit a two-run home run and the Braves went on to win the game, 3–1, and stayed in first place for the remainder of the regular season. With the Braves up five games in the NL standings and four games remaining on their regular season schedule, the Braves had a match-up with the Brooklyn Dodgers on September 29 but according to teammate Clint Conatser, Heath asked Braves manager Billy Southworth for the night off but his request was denied. During the game, Heath attempted to score from second base and slid towards home plate to try to beat the tag by Dodgers catcher Roy Campanella. As he slid, his foot got caught in the dirt which caused his ankle to twist. "I began to slide about five feet from the plate. Funny thing, I generally get my spikes up off the ground, but this time I didn't. I looked at my foot, which was twisted all the way around, and honestly I thought it would come right off", Heath said the next day from a local hospital. After playing in the majors for parts of 12 years, he would be forced to miss the World Series as it was later diagnosed he fractured his ankle. He called the broken ankle "the biggest disappointment of my life." A widely published newspaper photograph of the play showed Heath sliding toward the plate, mouth open in shock, with his leg bent mid-ankle with the lower ankle rotated ninety degrees to the upper ankle. He was quoted asking himself "Why did I slide?" when he was carried off the field on a stretcher and later put in an ambulance. In 1964, Heath said:

"I guess I didn't tuck my leg while sliding. Carl Furillo (Dodger rightfielder) made the throw. He had a great arm and I was out a mile. They (sportswriters) said it was an unnecessary slide in a game that didn't mean anything. The hell it was, you always slide. Besides Johnny Sain (Braves pitcher) was after his 23rd win and we wanted to shove Brooklyn into third place."

Heath's regular season came to an end, as he batted .319 with 20 home runs on the season. The Braves' season came to an end after six games in the World Series as they lost to the Indians, four games to two.

Heath played in the minors the following season before eventually rejoining the Braves during the 1949 season. In a game on August 28, Heath helped tie the Cincinnati Reds with a home run in the ninth inning and helped win the game for the Braves with another in the 10th inning. He ended his final major league season after 36 games into the 1949 season. He batted .306 with nine homers and 23 RBIs. In October 1949, the Braves placed Heath on waivers and general manager John Quinn offered him a managing position with a team in the Braves farm system, but he never accepted Quinn's offer to manage. Baseball historian Bill James when summarizing the 1940s listed Heath as the recipient for his designation of "A Better Ballplayer Than a Human Being." Southworth said, "They told me when I got him from the American League that Heath was a troublemaker. If he is, I'd sure like to have eight other troublemakers like him."

== Retirement ==
Before he retired from professional baseball, Heath appeared in 57 games for the Seattle Rainiers of the Pacific Coast League. He was later fired from the team. In 1951, he was given a trial basis with the Rainiers but was never signed.

Sportswriter Franklin Lewis interviewed Heath and asked if he would do anything differently in his career if he was given the chance. Heath responded, "I wouldn't gag around as much. I shouldn't have popped off. It's all right for little guys to talk loud, but not a big ox like me."

In his 14-season major league career, Heath posted a .293 batting average and a .509 slugging average, with 194 home runs, 1,447 hits, 887 RBIs, 777 runs, 279 doubles, 102 triples and 56 stolen bases in 1,383 games played. Defensively, he recorded a .972 fielding percentage as an outfielder. Among all players with a thousand games played in the 1940s, his Adjusted OPS+ was 142, third best in the decade. Bobby Thomson surpassed him in 1955 to become the major leagues' home run leader among foreign-born players. Heath was the first player to hit a home run in all AL and NL ballparks. He was named as one of the "Top 100 Greatest Indians." In 1988 he was inducted into the Canadian Baseball Hall of Fame.

He worked briefly as a scout for the Cleveland Indians. He later worked as a color commentator with the Rainiers and did advertising work in the Seattle area. During one game while Heath provided commentary, he cursed into the microphone on-air and later apologized. A station manager later approached him regarding the incident and Heath responded by throwing the manager down a flight of stairs.

Heath died of a heart attack in Seattle at age 60.^{[a]} He had suffered a heart attack in 1957 at the age of 43. He was survived by two daughters and one son.

== Footnotes ==
- ^{a} While the Associated Press story which ran on December 10, 1975, announcing Heath's death stated he was 59 years of age at the time of his death, several sources (including Baseball-Reference.com, The Canadian Baseball Hall of Fame and Museum, Society for American Baseball Research, and Biographical Dictionary of American Sports) list his death at the age of 60 and that he was born in 1915. A United Press International story released in 1939 stated Heath was born in 1916, not 1915.

== See also ==
- List of Major League Baseball players from Canada
- 20–20–20 club
- List of Major League Baseball career triples leaders
- List of Major League Baseball annual triples leaders
