= Ernie White =

American baseball player (1916–1974)

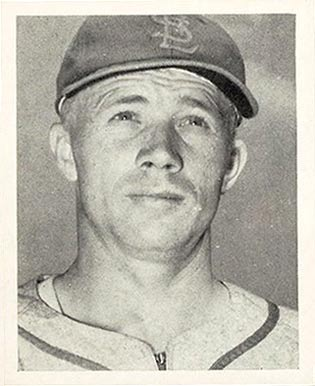
- Pitcher
- Born: September 5, 1916; Pacolet Mills, South Carolina, U.S.
- Died: May 22, 1974 (aged 57); Augusta, Georgia, U.S.
- Batted: Right Threw: Left

MLB debut
- May 9, 1940, for the St. Louis Cardinals

Last MLB appearance
- October 3, 1948, for the Boston Braves

MLB statistics
- Win–loss record: 30–21
- Earned run average: 2.78
- Strikeouts: 244
- Stats at Baseball Reference

Teams
- St. Louis Cardinals (1940–1943); Boston Braves (1946–1948)

Career highlights and awards
- World Series champion (1942)

Ernest Daniel White (September 5, 1916 – May 22, 1974) was an American professional baseball player who pitched in the Major Leagues from 1940 to 1943 and from 1946 to 1948. A native of Pacolet Mills, South Carolina, he threw left-handed, batted right-handed, stood 5 ft 11 1/2 in (1.82 m) tall and weighed 175 pounds (79 kg).

White pitched for two National League clubs, the St. Louis Cardinals and Boston Braves, during his seven-year MLB career, and was a member of three pennant-winners and one World Series champion. He threw a complete-game shutout in Game 3 of the 1942 World Series, defeating the New York Yankees 2–0 at Yankee Stadium, as the Cardinals beat New York in five games in the only World Series ever lost by the Yanks during Joe McCarthy's 15+-year term as manager. During the previous season, 1941, White enjoyed his best campaign, winning 17 of 24 decisions, compiling an ERA of 2.40, and finishing sixth in the NL Most Valuable Player poll.

White served in the U.S. Army during World War II, missing the 1944–45 seasons. While in Europe he participated in the Battle of the Bulge.

Because of a sore arm, White pitched in only one game and four innings for the 1947 Braves, and spent most of that campaign as a coach on the staff of Boston manager Billy Southworth. But he was able to return to the mound for 15 games and 23 innings with Boston's 1948 NL championship team.

In 108 career major-league games, he won 30 and lost 21 contests, with 24 complete games, five shutouts and six saves, with an earned run average of 2.78; in 4891/3 innings pitched, he struck out 244, and permitted 425 hits and 188 bases on balls. All thirty victories came during his first four years in the league as a Cardinal. His six-hit shutout of the Bombers in 1942 was his only World Series appearance.

In 1949, White embarked on a 15-year career as a minor league manager, toiling in the farm systems of the Braves, Cincinnati Reds, Kansas City Athletics, Yankees and New York Mets, winning three league championships. His 1952 Columbia Reds won 100 regular-season games, but lost in the Sally League playoffs. White also spent one season, 1963, as pitching coach of the Mets on the staff of legendary Casey Stengel.

White died in Augusta, Georgia, at the age of 57 from complications following knee surgery.

Sporting positions
Preceded by Red Ruffing	New York Mets pitching coach 1963	Succeeded by Mel Harder
