= Glenn Elliott (baseball) =

American baseball player (1919-1969)

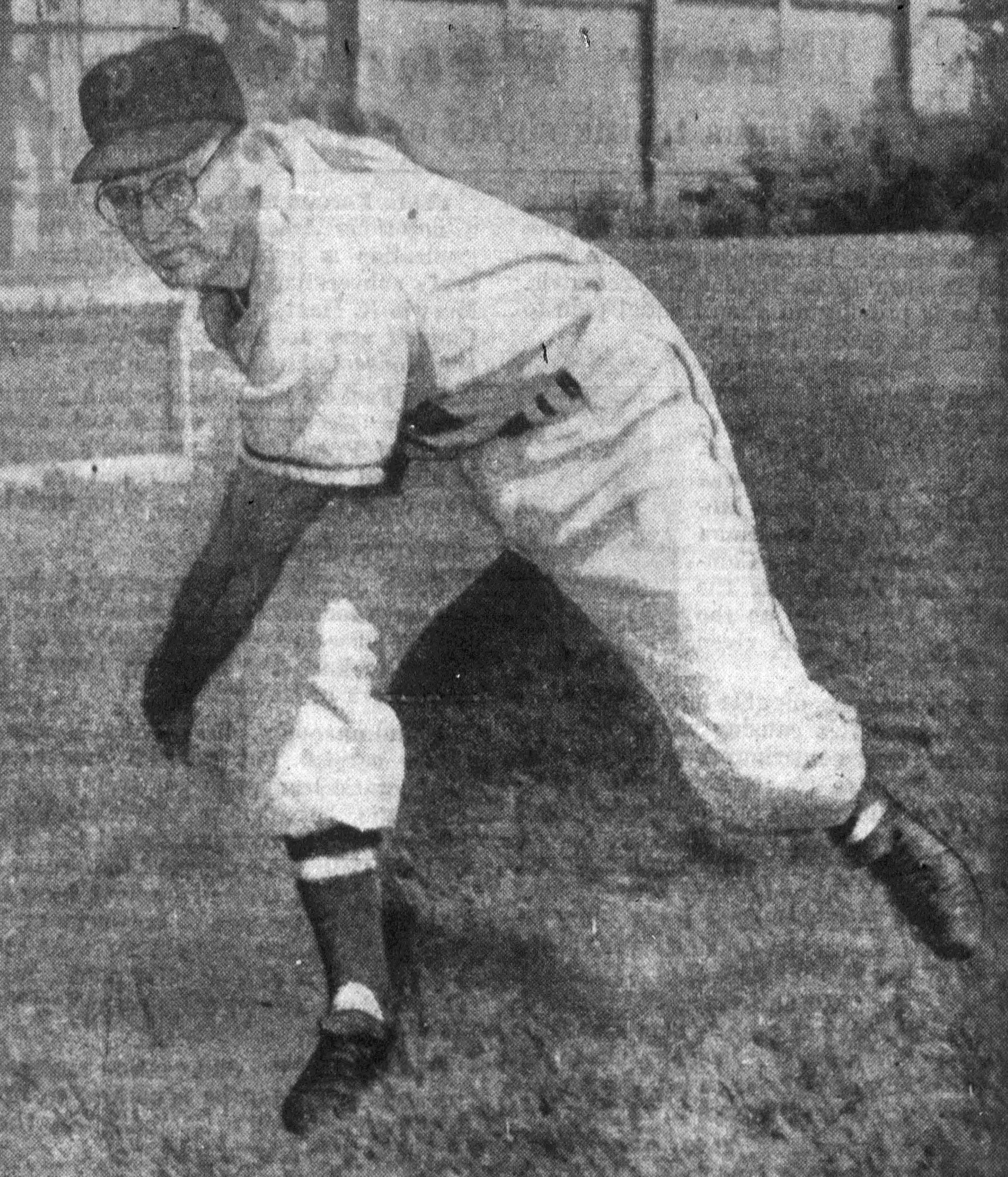
- Elliott, circa 1954
- Pitcher
- Born: November 11, 1919; Sapulpa, Oklahoma
- Died: July 27, 1969 (aged 49); Portland, Oregon
- Batted: Both Threw: Left

MLB debut
- April 17, 1947, for the Boston Braves

Last MLB appearance
- September 29, 1949, for the Boston Braves

MLB statistics
- Win–loss record: 4–5
- Earned run average: 4.08
- Strikeouts: 25
- Innings pitched: 90 1/3
- Stats at Baseball Reference

Teams
- Boston Braves (1947–1949)

Herbert Glenn Elliott (November 11, 1919 – July 27, 1969) was an American professional baseball player, a left-handed pitcher who worked in 34 Major League games between 1947 and 1949 for the Boston Braves. The native of Sapulpa, Oklahoma, stood 5 feet 10 inches (1.78 m) tall and weighed 170 pounds (77 kg).

Elliott starred for his high school in Myrtle Creek, Oregon, before playing for Oregon State University in college, lettering in 1940, 1941, and 1942. His pro pitching career lasted from 1942 to 1956, and he served as an area scout for the Philadelphia Phillies based in the Pacific Northwest from 1960 until his death, from a brain tumor, at age 49 in July 1969.

On April 17, 1947, Elliott, pitching in relief for the Braves against the Brooklyn Dodgers, surrendered Jackie Robinson's first major league hit, a bunt single down the third-base line.

Elliott allowed 93 hits and 39 bases on balls in 90 1/3 innings pitched in the Major Leagues, with 25 strikeouts. He made only one appearance for the 1948 National League champion Braves, on September 1 against the Cincinnati Reds. He started the game and lasted only three innings, but was ruled the winner of an 11–1 Boston victory by the official scorer. During a lengthy minor league career, he won 150 games.
