= Earl Browne =

American baseball player (1911–1993)

- Outfielder/First baseman
- Born: March 5, 1911; Louisville, Kentucky, U.S.
- Died: January 12, 1993 (aged 81); Whittier, California, U.S.
- Batted: Left Threw: Left

MLB debut
- September 12, 1935, for the Pittsburgh Pirates

Last MLB appearance
- May 22, 1938, for the Philadelphia Phillies

MLB statistics
- Batting average: .284
- Home runs: 6
- Hits: 131
- Stats at Baseball Reference

Teams
- Pittsburgh Pirates (1935–1936); Philadelphia Phillies (1937–1938)

Earl James Browne (March 5, 1911 – January 12, 1993) was an American professional baseball player and manager. An outfielder and first baseman, he threw and batted left-handed, stood 6 feet 0 inches (1.83 m) tall and weighed 175 pounds (79 kg). He was born in Louisville, Kentucky, and attended DuPont Manual High School in that city.

Browne spent one full season and parts of three others in Major League Baseball between 1935 and 1938, toiling for the Pittsburgh Pirates and Philadelphia Phillies. During his full season, spent with the 1937 Phillies, Browne appeared in 102 games, with 97 hits in 322 at bats for a .294 batting average, including six home runs and 52 runs batted in. Overall, he batted .284 with six homers and 69 RBI in 143 MLB games.

Browne also had a 22-year career in minor league baseball as a southpaw pitcher, outfielder and first baseman. He batted .304 in 2,167 minor league games, with 183 home runs and 1,301 RBI, and twice batted over .400 as a playing manager in the Class D KITTY League (1946–1947) as skipper of the Owensboro Oilers, a Boston Braves farm club. He compiled a 51–42 won/lost mark in six years as a minor league pitcher.

He died in Whittier, California, at the age of 81.
