= 1948 World Series =

1948 baseball championship series

Team (Wins)	Managers	Season
Cleveland Indians (4)	Lou Boudreau (player/manager)	97–58, .626, GA: 1
Boston Braves (2)	Billy Southworth	91–62, .595, GA: 6 1/2
- Dates: October 6–11
- Venue(s): Braves Field (Boston); Cleveland Stadium (Cleveland)
- Umpires: George Barr (NL), Bill Summers (AL), Bill Stewart (NL), Bill Grieve (AL), Babe Pinelli (NL: outfield only), Joe Paparella (AL: outfield only)
- Hall of Famers: Indians: Lou Boudreau; Larry Doby; Bob Feller; Joe Gordon; Bob Lemon; Satchel Paige; Braves: Billy Southworth (mgr.); Warren Spahn

Broadcast
- Television: NBC; CBS; ABC; DuMont
- TV announcers: Red Barber, Tom Hussey (in Boston) and Van Patrick (in Cleveland)
- Radio: Mutual
- Radio announcers: Mel Allen and Jim Britt

The 1948 World Series was the championship series in Major League Baseball for the 1948 season. The 45th edition of the World Series, it matched the American League (AL) champion Cleveland Indians and the National League (NL) champion Boston Braves. The Braves had won the National League pennant for the first time since the "Miracle Braves" team of 1914, while the Indians had spoiled a chance for the only all-Boston World Series by winning a one-game playoff against the Boston Red Sox for the American League flag. Though superstar pitcher Bob Feller failed to win either of his two starts, the Indians won the Series in six games to capture their second championship (as well as their most recent) and their first since 1920.

It was the first World Series to be televised beyond the previous year's limited New York-Schenectady-Philadelphia-Baltimore-Washington network and was announced by famed sportcasters Red Barber, Tom Hussey (in Boston) and Van Patrick (in Cleveland). This was the second appearance in the Fall Classic for both teams, with the Indians' lone previous appearance coming in a 1920 win against the Brooklyn Dodgers and the Braves' lone previous appearance coming in a 1914 win against the Philadelphia Athletics. Consequently, this was the first, and to date only, World Series in which both participating teams had previously played in, but not yet lost, a previous World Series. Currently, this phenomenon can only be repeated if the Miami Marlins or the Washington Nationals play against the Los Angeles Angels in a future World Series.

Television coverage of the World Series increased this year, but due to the medium still being in its infancy coverage was strictly regional. The series was open to any channel with an affiliation with one of the national broadcast networks: NBC, CBS, ABC, or DuMont. But games played in Boston could only be seen in the Northeast, while when the series shifted to Cleveland those games were the first to be aired in Chicago, Pittsburgh, Milwaukee, St. Louis, Detroit and Toledo.

This was the only World Series played between 1947 and 1958 not to feature a New York team, and the last not won by a New York team until the 1957 Series (which the Braves, having relocated to Milwaukee, won over the Yankees). The two teams would meet again in the 1995 Series, with the Braves—by then relocated to Atlanta—winning. This was the first World Series, and the last until 2016, in which both teams scored the same number of total runs. This would be the final World Series to feature a team helmed by a player-manager. This is also the only World Series pre-1967 in which the winning team had not won at least one Commissioner's Trophy after its introduction in the 1967 World Series.

As of 2026, this is Cleveland’s last World Series victory, and they now hold the longest championship drought in the majors.

== Summary ==
AL Cleveland Indians (4) vs. NL Boston Braves (2)

Game	Date	Score	Location	Time	Attendance
1	October 6	Cleveland Indians – 0, Boston Braves – 1	Braves Field	1:42	40,135
2	October 7	Cleveland Indians – 4, Boston Braves – 1	Braves Field	2:14	39,633
3	October 8	Boston Braves – 0, Cleveland Indians – 2	Cleveland Municipal Stadium	1:36	70,306
4	October 9	Boston Braves – 1, Cleveland Indians – 2	Cleveland Municipal Stadium	1:31	81,897
5	October 10	Boston Braves – 11, Cleveland Indians – 5	Cleveland Municipal Stadium	2:39	86,288
6	October 11	Cleveland Indians – 4, Boston Braves – 3	Braves Field	2:16	40,103

== Matchups ==
=== Game 1 ===
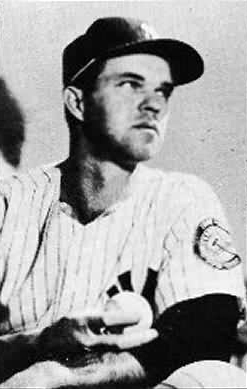
Johnny Sain

October 6, 1948 1:00 pm (ET) at Braves Field in Boston, Massachusetts
Team	1	2	3	4	5	6	7	8	9	R	H	E
Cleveland	0	0	0	0	0	0	0	0	0	0	4	0
Boston	0	0	0	0	0	0	0	1	X	1	2	2
WP: Johnny Sain (1–0) LP: Bob Feller (0–1)

Braves pitcher Johnny Sain and Indians pitcher Bob Feller were engaged in a scoreless pitchers' duel when the Braves came to bat in the bottom of the eighth inning. Feller walked Braves catcher Bill Salkeld to open the inning. Braves manager, Billy Southworth then replaced the slow-footed Salkeld with Phil Masi, who entered the game as a pinch runner. Mike McCormick followed with a sacrifice bunt, advancing Masi to second base. Feller issued an intentional walk to Eddie Stanky, who was replaced by Sibby Sisti. Feller then tried to pick off Masi at second base. Indians' shortstop Lou Boudreau appeared to tag Masi out, but umpire Bill Stewart called him safe. Tommy Holmes proceeded to hit a single that allowed Masi to score the only run of the game, giving the Braves a 1–0 victory.

The umpire's controversial ruling touched off heated debates among the media and fans, especially after Associated Press photographs of the play were published. Although Feller allowed only two hits, he took the loss in what would be the closest he came to winning a World Series game. Upon his death in 1990, Masi's will revealed that he really was out on the pick-off play.

=== Game 2 ===
Bob Lemon

October 7, 1948 1:00 pm (ET) at Braves Field in Boston, Massachusetts
Team	1	2	3	4	5	6	7	8	9	R	H	E
Cleveland	0	0	0	2	1	0	0	0	1	4	8	1
Boston	1	0	0	0	0	0	0	0	0	1	8	3
WP: Bob Lemon (1–0) LP: Warren Spahn (0–1)

The second game also made television history when a live broadcast of the Indians–Braves matchup was shown aboard the Baltimore and Ohio Railroad's Marylander passenger train travelling between Washington, D.C., and New York City, using a receiver operated by Bendix Corporation technicians. An Associated Press reporter observing the demonstration said, "Technically, it was surprisingly good." The Braves scored a run in the first off Bob Lemon on Bob Elliott's RBI single with two on, but Lemon held them scoreless for the rest of the game. After three shutout innings, Lou Boudreau hit a leadoff double in the fourth off Warren Spahn, then scored on Joe Gordon's single with Gordon advancing to second on the throw to home. One out later, Larry Doby's RBI single put the Indians up 2–1. Next inning, Dale Mitchell hit a leadoff single, moved to second on a sacrifice bunt and scored on Boudreau's single. The Indians scored one more run in the ninth off Nels Potter when Jim Hegan reached on an error, moved to third on two groundouts and scored on Bob Kennedy's single. The series was tied 1–1 heading to Cleveland.

=== Game 3 ===
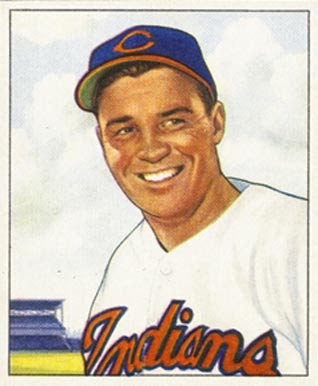
Gene Bearden

October 8, 1948 1:00 pm (ET) at Cleveland Municipal Stadium in Cleveland, Ohio
Team	1	2	3	4	5	6	7	8	9	R	H	E
Boston	0	0	0	0	0	0	0	0	0	0	5	1
Cleveland	0	0	1	1	0	0	0	0	X	2	5	0
WP: Gene Bearden (1–0) LP: Vern Bickford (0–1)

For the third straight game, no home runs were hit by either team. This would not happen again in a World Series until 2014. The game's two runs came on Larry Doby's groundout in the third after a double and walk and Jim Hegan's RBI single after a single and walk in the fourth, both off Vern Bickford. Gene Bearden pitched a complete shutout, allowing five hits while striking out four, as the Indians took a 2–1 series lead.

=== Game 4 ===
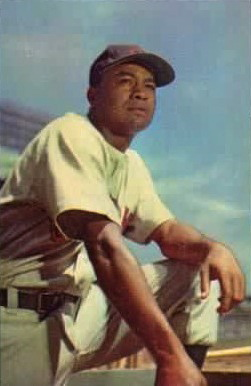
Larry Doby

October 9, 1948 1:00 pm (ET) at Cleveland Municipal Stadium in Cleveland, Ohio
Team	1	2	3	4	5	6	7	8	9	R	H	E
Boston	0	0	0	0	0	0	1	0	0	1	7	0
Cleveland	1	0	1	0	0	0	0	0	X	2	5	0
WP: Steve Gromek (1–0) LP: Johnny Sain (1–1); Home runs: BOS: Marv Rickert (1); CLE: Larry Doby (1)

Steve Gromek of the Indians and Johnny Sain of the Braves pitched complete games each. The Indians struck first when Dale Mitchell hit a leadoff single in the first and scored on Lou Boudreau's double, then added to their lead on Larry Doby's home run in the third. Marv Rickert's leadoff home run in the seventh cut the Indians' lead to 2–1, but they held on to take a 3–1 series lead.

=== Game 5 ===
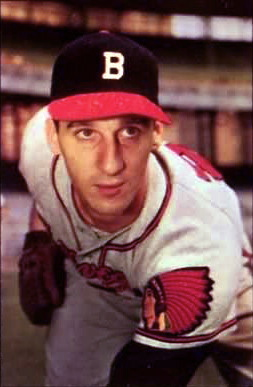
Warren Spahn

October 10, 1948 1:00 pm (ET) at Cleveland Municipal Stadium in Cleveland, Ohio
Team	1	2	3	4	5	6	7	8	9	R	H	E
Boston	3	0	1	0	0	1	6	0	0	11	12	0
Cleveland	1	0	0	4	0	0	0	0	0	5	6	2
WP: Warren Spahn (1–1) LP: Bob Feller (0–2); Home runs: BOS: Bob Elliott 2 (2), Bill Salkeld (1); CLE: Dale Mitchell (1), Jim Hegan (1)

Satchel Paige appeared for the Indians, becoming the first black pitcher to take the mound in World Series history. The previous day's single-game attendance record was broken with 86,288 fans. After two leadoff singles, Bob Elliott's three-run home run in the first off Indians starter Bob Feller made it 3–0 Braves. Dale Mitchell's leadoff home run in the bottom half off Nels Potter put the Indians on the board. Elliott's second home run of the game in the third made it 4–1 Braves, but in the fourth after a leadoff single and walk, Walt Judnich's RBI single made it 4–2 Braves, then one out later, Jim Hegan's three-run home run put the Indians in front 5–4 and knock Potter out of the game. Bill Salkeld's home run in the sixth tied the game. Next inning, Tommy Holmes hit a leadoff single, moved to second on a sacrifice bunt, and scored on Earl Torgeson's RBI single. Ed Klieman relieved Feller and allowed a walk, two-runs single to Marv Rickert, and another walk. Russ Christopher then allowed RBI singles to Mike McCormick and Eddie Stanky. Warren Spahn's sacrifice fly off Paige capped the game's scoring at 11–5. Spahn pitched 5 2/3 shutout innings of relief for the win, forcing a Game 6 in Boston.

=== Game 6 ===
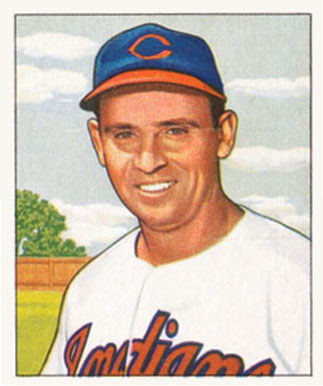
Joe Gordon

October 11, 1948 1:00 pm (ET) at Braves Field in Boston, Massachusetts
Team	1	2	3	4	5	6	7	8	9	R	H	E
Cleveland	0	0	1	0	0	2	0	1	0	4	10	0
Boston	0	0	0	1	0	0	0	2	0	3	9	0
WP: Bob Lemon (2–0) LP: Bill Voiselle (0–1) Sv: Gene Bearden (1); Home runs: CLE: Joe Gordon (1); BOS: None

The Indians struck first in Game 6 when Dale Mitchell hit a leadoff double in the third off Bill Voiselle and scored on Lou Boudreau's RBI double, but the Braves tied the game on Mike McCormick's RBI single with two on off Bob Lemon in the fourth. A walk loaded the bases, but Voiselle grounded out to end the inning. Joe Gordon's leadoff home in the sixth put the Indians back in front 2–1. After a one-out walk and single, Jim Hegan's RBI groundout extended their lead to 3–1. Three straight singles in the eighth by Ken Keltner, Thurman Tucker and Eddie Robinson made it 4–1 Indians. In the bottom of the inning, the Braves loaded the bases off Lemon on a single, double and walk. Clint Conatser's sacrifice fly and Phil Masi's RBI double off Gene Bearden made it 4–3 Indians, but Bearden pitched a scoreless ninth for the save to give the Indians the championship.

To date, this is Cleveland’s last World Series victory, and they now hold the longest championship drought in the majors. The only team of the four major North American leagues with a longer championship drought are the NFL’s Arizona Cardinals, who last won a championship in 1947 as the Chicago Cardinals, a year before Cleveland’s World Series victory.

== Composite box ==
1948 World Series (4–2): Cleveland Indians (AL) over Boston Braves (NL)

Team	1	2	3	4	5	6	7	8	9	R	H	E
Cleveland Indians	2	0	3	7	1	2	0	1	1	17	38	3
Boston Braves	4	0	1	1	0	1	7	3	0	17	43	6
Total attendance: 358,362 Average attendance: 59,727; Winning player's share: $6,772 Losing player's share: $4,571
