= 1950 Philadelphia Phillies season =

Major League Baseball season

1950 Philadelphia Phillies
- National League Champion
- Granny Hamner, Del Ennis, and Richie Ashburn of the 1950 Phillies "Whiz Kids" in a promotional photo.
- League: National League
- Ballpark: Shibe Park
- City: Philadelphia
- Owners: R. R. M. Carpenter, Jr.
- General managers: R. R. M. Carpenter, Jr.
- Managers: Eddie Sawyer
- Television: WPTZ; WCAU; WFIL (Bill Campbell)
- Radio: WPEN (Gene Kelly, Bill Brundige)

The 1950 Philadelphia Phillies season was the 68th season in the history of the franchise.

The Phillies won the National League pennant by two games over the Brooklyn Dodgers. It marked the second pennant in franchise history. Nicknamed the "Whiz Kids" because of the youth of their roster, they went on to lose the World Series to the New York Yankees in four straight games.

== Previous off-season ==
- October 3, 1949: Schoolboy Rowe was released by the Phillies.
- November 17, 1949: Milo Candini was drafted by the Phillies from the Oakland Oaks in the 1949 rule 5 draft.
- Prior to 1950 season: Bob Bowman was signed as an amateur free agent by the Phillies.

On January 10, 1950, owner Bob Carpenter announced that the club had officially abandoned the nickname "Blue Jays" and would be the "Phillies". The club had adopted the nickname in 1944 but it never caught on among fans.

== City Series ==
The pre-season 1950 City Series was planned for three games prior to Opening Day. Snow flurries and cold weather in Philadelphia caused the cancellation of the first game. The Athletics beat the Phillies 7–4 and the Phillies won the following game 11–2.

== Regular season ==
=== Season standings ===
National League
Team	W	L	Pct.	GB	Home	Road
Philadelphia Phillies	91	63	.591	—	48‍–‍29	43‍–‍34
Brooklyn Dodgers	89	65	.578	2	48‍–‍30	41‍–‍35
New York Giants	86	68	.558	5	44‍–‍32	42‍–‍36
Boston Braves	83	71	.539	8	46‍–‍31	37‍–‍40
St. Louis Cardinals	78	75	.510	12½	48‍–‍28	30‍–‍47
Cincinnati Reds	66	87	.431	24½	38‍–‍38	28‍–‍49
Chicago Cubs	64	89	.418	26½	35‍–‍42	29‍–‍47
Pittsburgh Pirates	57	96	.373	33½	33‍–‍44	24‍–‍52

=== Record vs. opponents ===
1950 National League record Sources:
Team	BSN	BRO	CHC	CIN	NYG	PHI	PIT	STL
Boston	—	9–13	9–13	17–5	13–9	9–13–1	15–7–1	11–11
Brooklyn	13–9	—	10–12	12–10	12–10	11–11–1	19–3	12–10
Chicago	13–9	12–10	—	4–17	5–17	9–13–1	11–11	10–12
Cincinnati	5–17	10–12	17–4	—	11–11	4–18	12–10	7–15
New York	9–13	10–12	17–5	11–11	—	12–10	16–6	11–11
Philadelphia	13–9–1	11–11–1	13–9–1	18–4	10–12	—	14–8	12–10
Pittsburgh	7–15–1	3–19	11–11	10–12	6–16	8–14	—	12–9
St. Louis	11–11	10–12	12–10	15–7	11–11	10–12	9–12	—

=== Game log ===
Legend
	Phillies win
	Phillies loss
	Phillies tie
	Postponement
**Bold**	Phillies team member

1950 Game Log
Overall Record: 91–63–3
April (6–6–1)

#	Date	Opponent	Score	Win	Loss	Save	Attendance	Record
1	April 18	Dodgers	9–1	**Robin Roberts** (1–0)	Don Newcombe (0–1)	None	29,074	1–0
2	April 19	Dodgers	5–7	Bud Podbielan (1–0)	**Russ Meyer** (0–1)	None	8,450	1–1
–	April 20	Dodgers	Postponed (rain); Makeup: September 8					
3	April 21	@ Braves	2–2 (7)^{^{[a]}}	None	None	None	7,308	1–1–1
4	April 22	@ Braves	2–3	Warren Spahn (2–0)	**Curt Simmons** (0–1)	None	7,607	1–2–1
5	April 23 (1)	@ Braves	3–4	Johnny Sain (2–0)	**Blix Donnelly** (0–1)	None	see 2nd game	1–3–1
6	April 23 (2)	@ Braves	6–5	**Jim Konstanty** (1–0)	Bobby Hogue (0–1)	None	10,302	2–3–1
–	April 24	@ Giants	Postponed (rain and cold); Makeup: August 20					
7	April 25	@ Giants	4–8	Larry Jansen (1–1)	**Russ Meyer** (0–2)	None	4,940	2–4–1
8	April 26	@ Dodgers	4–5 (10)^{^{[b]}}	Willie Ramsdell (1–0)	**Blix Donnelly** (0–2)	None	21,556	2–5–1
9	April 27	@ Dodgers	9–2	**Robin Roberts** (2–0)	Preacher Roe (1–1)	None	5,488	3–5–1
10	April 28	Braves	6–1	**Curt Simmons** (1–1)	Johnny Sain (2–1)	None	22,231	4–5–1
11	April 29	Braves	2–1	**Bob Miller** (1–0)	Vern Bickford (0–2)	None	5,064	5–5–1
12	April 30 (1)	Braves	1–4	Normie Roy (1–0)	**Russ Meyer** (0–3)	None	see 2nd game	5–6–1
13	April 30 (2)	Braves	9–3	**Robin Roberts** (3–0)	Dick Donovan (0–2)	None	14,201	6–6–1

May (17–9)

#	Date	Opponent	Score	Win	Loss	Save	Attendance	Record
14	May 2	@ Cubs	8–10	Bob Rush (2–0)	**Ken Heintzelman** (0–1)	Dutch Leonard (2)	6,279	6–7–1
15	May 3	@ Cubs	5–2	**Ken Johnson** (1–0)	Johnny Klippstein (0–1)	**Jim Konstanty** (1)	4,071	7–7–1
16	May 4	@ Cardinals	9–6	**Curt Simmons** (2–1)	Gerry Staley (1–2)	**Jim Konstanty** (2)	9,871	8–7–1
17	May 5	@ Cardinals	2–3	Harry Brecheen (2–1)	**Robin Roberts** (3–1)	None	12,302	8–8–1
18	May 6	@ Cardinals	11–7	**Bob Miller** (2–0)	Max Lanier (1–1)	**Jim Konstanty** (3)	9,730	9–8–1
19	May 7 (1)	@ Reds	6–0	**Ken Heintzelman** (1–1)	Howie Fox (1–2)	None	see 2nd game	10–8–1
20	May 7 (2)	@ Reds	6–4	**Curt Simmons** (3–1)	Ewell Blackwell (1–1)	None	13,313	11–8–1
21	May 8	@ Reds	6–5	**Ken Johnson** (2–0)	Herm Wehmeier (1–3)	**Bob Miller** (1)	5,141	12–8–1
–	May 10	@ Pirates	Postponed (rain); Makeup: July 24					
22	May 11	@ Pirates	3–2	**Robin Roberts** (4–1)	Murry Dickson (2–3)	None	28,452	13–8–1
23	May 13	Giants	7–1	**Curt Simmons** (4–1)	Dave Koslo (1–3)	None	12,596	14–8–1
24	May 14 (1)	Giants	3–4	Larry Jansen (2–3)	**Ken Heintzelman** (1–2)	None	see 2nd game	14–9–1
25	May 14 (2)	Giants	9–7^{^{[c]}}	**Jim Konstanty** (2–0)	Sheldon Jones (1–4)	**Robin Roberts** (1)	25,769	15–9–1
26	May 16	Reds	1–0	**Robin Roberts** (5–1)	Ewell Blackwell (2–2)	None	16,041	16–9–1
27	May 17	Reds	5–4	**Ken Johnson** (3–0)	Herm Wehmeier (1–4)	None	12,655	17–9–1
–	May 18	Reds	Postponed (rain and wet grounds); Makeup: August 1 as a traditional double-header					
–	May 19	Cubs	Postponed (rain); Makeup: July 25 as a traditional double-header					
28	May 20	Cubs	2–7	Bob Rush (5–0)	**Curt Simmons** (4–2)	None	4,020	17–10–1
29	May 21 (1)	Cardinals	5–6	Gerry Staley (3–3)	**Robin Roberts** (5–2)	Howie Pollet (1)	see 2nd game	17–11–1
30	May 21 (2)	Cardinals	4–2	**Curt Simmons** (5–2)	Cloyd Boyer (1–1)	None	32,986	18–11–1
31	May 23	Pirates	0–6	Bill Macdonald (1–0)	**Russ Meyer** (0–4)	None	12,428	18–12–1
32	May 24	Pirates	6–3	**Jim Konstanty** (3–0)	Bill Werle (3–2)	None	18,993	19–12–1
33	May 25	Pirates	3–0	**Bob Miller** (3–0)	Cliff Chambers (5–4)	None	5,265	20–12–1
34	May 26	@ Giants	3–2	**Robin Roberts** (6–2)	Jack Kramer (0–2)	None	17,782	21–12–1
35	May 27	@ Giants	8–5	**Curt Simmons** (6–2)	Sheldon Jones (2–6)	**Jim Konstanty** (4)	13,273	22–12–1
36	May 28 (1)	@ Giants	5–2 (11)	**Jim Konstanty** (4–0)	Andy Hansen (0–1)	None	23,956	23–12–1
37	May 28 (2)	@ Giants	1–3	Dave Koslo (3–4)	**Ken Heintzelman** (1–3)	None	23,986	23–13–1
38	May 30 (1)	@ Dodgers	6–7 (10)	Preacher Roe (5–2)	**Jim Konstanty** (4–1)	None	18,884	23–14–1
39	May 30 (2)	@ Dodgers	4–6	Jack Banta (4–1)	**Russ Meyer** (0–5)	Ralph Branca (1)	34,700	23–15–1

June (14–11)

#	Date	Opponent	Score	Win	Loss	Save	Attendance	Record
40	June 1	@ Cubs	8–4	**Curt Simmons** (7–2)	Frank Hiller (3–1)	**Jim Konstanty** (5)	9,812	24–15–1
–	June 2	@ Cubs	Postponed (wet grounds); Makeup: July 18 as a traditional double-header					
41	June 3	@ Cubs	6–2	**Bubba Church** (1–0)	Bob Rush (6–2)	**Jim Konstanty** (6)	not available	25–15–1
42	June 4	@ Cardinals	2–6	Max Lanier (4–2)	**Ken Heintzelman** (1–4)	None	30,956	25–16–1
43	June 5	@ Cardinals	6–5	**Robin Roberts** (7–2)	Red Munger (2–2)	None	15,604	26–16–1
44	June 6	@ Cardinals	4–5	Howie Pollet (5–3)	**Curt Simmons** (7–3)	None	16,328	26–17–1
45	June 7	@ Reds	4–0	**Bob Miller** (4–0)	Willie Ramsdell (2–6)	None	8,220	27–17–1
46	June 8	@ Reds	4–8	Ken Raffensberger (5–5)	**Russ Meyer** (0–6)	None	4,102	27–18–1
–	June 9	@ Reds	Postponed (rain); Makeup: July 22 as a traditional double-header					
–	June 10	@ Pirates	Postponed (rain); Makeup: July 19 as a traditional double-header					
47	June 11 (1)	@ Pirates	7–6	**Jim Konstanty** (5–1)	Vern Law (0–1)	None	see 2nd game	28–18–1
48	June 11 (2)	@ Pirates	4–5 (12)	Bill Werle (4–4)	**Blix Donnelly** (0–3)	None	33,217	28–19–1
49	June 13	Cardinals	3–6	Harry Brecheen (4–3)	**Curt Simmons** (7–4)	None	28,587	28–20–1
50	June 14	Cardinals	2–4	Max Lanier (6–2)	**Ken Heintzelman** (1–5)	None	15,563	28–21–1
–	June 15	Cardinals	Postponed (rain); Makeup: August 7					
–	June 16	Reds	Postponed (rain); Makeup: August 3					
51	June 17	Reds	5–2	**Robin Roberts** (8–2)	Ewell Blackwell (4–7)	None	7,669	29–21–1
52	June 18 (1)	Reds	4–3	**Curt Simmons** (8–4)	Herm Wehmeier (3–8)	None	see 2nd game	30–21–1
53	June 18 (2)	Reds	4–2	**Bob Miller** (5–0)	Howie Fox (1–5)	None	20,495	31–21–1
54	June 20	Pirates	7–3	**Russ Meyer** (1–6)	Vern Law (0–2)	None	13,597	32–21–1
55	June 21	Pirates	3–5	Bill Macdonald (3–1)	**Robin Roberts** (8–3)	Bill Werle (6)	18,632	32–22–1
56	June 22	Pirates	7–4	**Bob Miller** (6–0)	Hank Borowy (0–2)	None	5,326	33–22–1
57	June 23	Cubs	4–7	Doyle Lade (3–1)	**Curt Simmons** (8–5)	Paul Minner (3)	21,030	33–23–1
58	June 24	Cubs	5–4	**Russ Meyer** (2–6)	Frank Hiller (4–2)	**Jim Konstanty** (7)	7,195	34–23–1
59	June 25 (1)	Cubs	8–11	Johnny Schmitz (8–3)	**Jim Konstanty** (5–2)	Doyle Lade (2)	see 2nd game	34–24–1
60	June 25 (2)	Cubs	2–1	**Robin Roberts** (9–3)	Bob Rush (8–6)	None	18,484	35–24–1
61	June 27	@ Braves	3–2	**Curt Simmons** (9–5)	Warren Spahn (9–8)	**Jim Konstanty** (8)	13,361	36–24–1
62	June 28	@ Braves	1–3	Johnny Sain (10–5)	**Russ Meyer** (2–7)	None	18,724	36–25–1
63	June 29	@ Braves	2–3	Vern Bickford (7–6)	**Ken Heintzelman** (1–6)	None	13,980	36–26–1
64	June 30	Dodgers	8–5	**Jim Konstanty** (6–2)	Don Newcombe (7–3)	**Bubba Church** (1)	31,555	37–26–1

July (21–13–1)

#	Date	Opponent	Score	Win	Loss	Save	Attendance	Record
65	July 1	Dodgers	6–4	**Bob Miller** (7–0)	Bud Podbielan (5–4)	**Jim Konstanty** (9)	18,761	38–26–1
66	July 2 (1)	Dodgers	6–4	**Russ Meyer** (3–7)	Ralph Branca (2–4)	**Jim Konstanty** (10)	see 2nd game	39–26–1
67	July 2 (2)	Dodgers	8–8 (10)^{^{[d]}}	None	None	None	35,118	39–26–2
68	July 3	Braves	1–3	Vern Bickford (8–6)	**Ken Heintzelman** (1–7)	None	11,162	39–27–2
69	July 4 (1)	Braves	14–5	**Robin Roberts** (10–3)	Normie Roy (3–3)	None	see 2nd game	40–27–2
70	July 4 (2)	Braves	9–12	Bobby Hogue (3–2)	**Jim Konstanty** (6–3)	Warren Spahn (1)	21,190	40–28–2
71	July 5	Giants	10–3	**Russ Meyer** (4–7)	Clint Hartung (3–3)	None	17,771	41–28–2
72	July 6	Giants	9–6	**Bob Miller** (8–0)	Sheldon Jones (6–10)	**Jim Konstanty** (11)	8,709	42–28–2
73	July 7	@ Dodgers	7–2	**Curt Simmons** (10–5)	Ralph Branca (2–5)	None	28,585	43–28–2
74	July 8	@ Dodgers	4–1	**Jim Konstanty** (7–3)	Don Newcombe (7–5)	None	20,714	44–28–2
75	July 9	@ Dodgers	3–7	Erv Palica (2–1)	**Russ Meyer** (4–8)	None	20,895	44–29–2
–	July 11	**1950 Major League Baseball All-Star Game at Comiskey Park in Chicago**						
76	July 13	@ Cardinals	3–2	**Curt Simmons** (11–5)	Howie Pollet (9–6)	None	24,471	45–29–2
77	July 14	@ Cardinals	2–4	Gerry Staley (8–6)	**Robin Roberts** (10–4)	None	25,529	45–30–2
78	July 15	@ Cardinals	6–8	Fred Martin (3–1)	**Jim Konstanty** (7–4)	Al Brazle (5)	20,219	45–31–2
79	July 16 (1)	@ Cubs	0–8	Monk Dubiel (4–3)	**Russ Meyer** (4–9)	None	see 2nd game	45–32–2
80	July 16 (2)	@ Cubs	3–10	Doyle Lade (5–3)	**Bob Miller** (8–1)	None	35,710	45–33–2
–	July 17	@ Cubs	Postponed (rain); Makeup: August 28 (which later became a traditional double-header)					
81	July 18 (1)	@ Cubs	2–5	Paul Minner (4–5)	**Robin Roberts** (10–5)	None	see 2nd game	45–34–2
82	July 18 (2)	@ Cubs	8–3	**Bubba Church** (2–0)	Bob Rush (9–10)	None	28,861	46–34–2
83	July 19 (1)	@ Pirates	3–2 (11)	**Curt Simmons** (12–5)	Bill Werle (5–8)	**Jim Konstanty** (12)	see 2nd game	47–34–2
84	July 19 (2)	@ Pirates	2–4	Bill Macdonald (4–3)	**Russ Meyer** (4–10)	None	18,953	47–35–2
85	July 20	@ Pirates	8–10	Murry Dickson (5–10)	**Blix Donnelly** (0–4)	None	7,291	47–36–2
86	July 21	@ Pirates	4–1	**Bubba Church** (3–0)	Mel Queen (3–8)	None	34,016	48–36–2
87	July 22 (1)	@ Reds	2–0	**Robin Roberts** (11–5)	Willie Ramsdell (5–8)	None	see 2nd game	49–36–2
88	July 22 (2)	@ Reds	1–6	Howie Fox (5–6)	**Ken Heintzelman** (1–8)	None	13,215	49–37–2
89	July 23 (1)	@ Reds	12–4	**Curt Simmons** (13–5)	Ken Raffensberger (9–11)	None	see 2nd game	50–37–2
90	July 23 (2)	@ Reds	7–4	**Russ Meyer** (5–10)	Ewell Blackwell (8–10)	**Jim Konstanty** (13)	28,831	51–37–2
91	July 24	@ Pirates	1–2 (6)	Bill Macdonald (5–3)	**Bob Miller** (8–2)	None	15,431	51–38–2
92	July 25 (1)	Cubs	7–0	**Bubba Church** (4–0)	Johnny Klippstein (1–3)	None	see 2nd game	52–38–2
93	July 25 (2)	Cubs	1–0	**Robin Roberts** (12–5)	Bob Rush (9–11)	None	32,726	53–38–2
94	July 26	Cubs	6–4	**Milo Candini** (1–0)	Monk Dubiel (4–4)	**Jim Konstanty** (14)	11,693	54–38–2
95	July 27	Cubs	13–3	**Curt Simmons** (14–5)	Doyle Lade (5–5)	None	7,343	55–38–2
96	July 28	Pirates	4–1	**Bob Miller** (9–2)	Bill Macdonald (5–4)	None	7,343	56–38–2
97	July 29	Pirates	4–7	Bill Werle (6–8)	**Bubba Church** (4–1)	None	10,252	56–39–2
98	July 30 (1)	Pirates	10–0	**Robin Roberts** (13–5)	Mel Queen (4–9)	None	see 2nd game	57–39–2
99	July 30 (2)	Pirates	4–2	**Jim Konstanty** (8–4)	Murry Dickson (5–11)	**Russ Meyer** (1)	21,411	58–39–2

August (20–8–1)

#	Date	Opponent	Score	Win	Loss	Save	Attendance	Record
100	August 1 (1)	Reds	6–4	**Bob Miller** (10–2)	Frank Smith (1–4)	**Jim Konstanty** (15)	see 2nd game	59–39–2
101	August 1 (2)	Reds	1–4	Ewell Blackwell (10–11)	**Curt Simmons** (14–6)	None	34,728	59–40–2
102	August 2	Reds	2–0	**Bubba Church** (5–1)	Willie Ramsdell (5–9)	None	8,540	60–40–2
–	August 3	Reds	Postponed (rain); Makeup: September 15 as a traditional double-header					
103	August 4	Cardinals	4–2	**Robin Roberts** (14–5)	Howie Pollet (10–9)	None	27,691	61–40–2
104	August 5	Cardinals	2–1	**Russ Meyer** (6–10)	Gerry Staley (10–9)	**Jim Konstanty** (16)	21,869	62–40–2
105	August 6 (1)	Cardinals	1–7	Cloyd Boyer (5–2)	**Bob Miller** (10–3)	None	see 2nd game	62–41–2
106	August 6 (2)	Cardinals	0–2	Max Lanier (10–4)	**Bubba Church** (5–2)	None	31,914	62–42–2
107	August 7	Cardinals	9–0	**Ken Johnson** (4–0)	Harry Brecheen (6–8)	None	25,251	63–42–2
108	August 8	@ Dodgers	6–5	**Robin Roberts** (15–5)	Don Newcombe (11–7)	**Jim Konstanty** (17)	32,886	64–42–2
109	August 9	@ Dodgers	5–4	**Russ Meyer** (7–10)	Erv Palica (4–4)	**Jim Konstanty** (18)	19,644	65–42–2
110	August 10	Giants	6–5 (10)	**Jim Konstanty** (9–4)	Dave Koslo (11–9)	None	33,032	66–42–2
111	August 11	Giants	1–3	Sal Maglie (10–3)	**Curt Simmons** (14–7)	None	15,895	66–43–2
112	August 12	Giants	5–4 (11)^{^{[e]}}	**Jim Konstanty** (10–4)	Dave Koslo (11–10)	None	14,955	67–43–2
113	August 13	Giants	0–2	Jim Hearn (4–2)	**Ken Johnson** (4–1)	None	19,644	67–44–2
114	August 15	Braves	9–1	**Curt Simmons** (15–7)	Johnny Sain (16–9)	**Jim Konstanty** (19)	32,215	68–44–2
115	August 16	Braves	5–1	**Robin Roberts** (16–5)	Vern Bickford (14–9)	None	23,846	69–44–2
116	August 18	@ Giants	4–7	Jim Hearn (5–2)	**Russ Meyer** (7–11)	None	26,086	69–45–2
–	August 19	@ Giants	Postponed (rain); Makeup: September 27 as a traditional double-header					
–	August 20 (1)	@ Giants	Postponed (rain); Makeup: August 21					
–	August 20 (2)	@ Giants	Postponed (rain); Makeup: September 28 as a traditional double-header					
117	August 21	@ Giants	4–0	**Curt Simmons** (16–7)	Larry Jansen (13–9)	None	19,320	70–45–2
118	August 22	@ Reds	4–3	**Robin Roberts** (17–5)	Ken Raffensberger (12–14)	None	11,660	71–45–2
119	August 23	@ Reds	6–4	**Bob Miller** (11–3)	Willie Ramsdell (6–11)	**Jim Konstanty** (20)	5,964	72–45–2
120	August 24	@ Pirates	4–2	**Bubba Church** (6–2)	Vern Law (3–6)	None	9,096	73–45–2
121	August 25	@ Pirates	9–7 (15)	**Jim Konstanty** (11–4)	Cliff Chambers (10–14)	None	25,686	74–45–2
122	August 26	@ Pirates	4–14	Murry Dickson (7–13)	**Robin Roberts** (17–6)	None	12,157	74–46–2
123	August 27 (1)	@ Cubs	6–1	**Bubba Church** (7–2)	Paul Minner (7–9)	None	see 2nd game	75–46–2
124	August 27 (2)	@ Cubs	4–4 (11)^{^{[f]}}	None	None	None	38,944	75–46–3
125	August 28 (1)	@ Cubs	5–7	Dutch Leonard (4–1)	**Curt Simmons** (16–8)	Johnny Vander Meer (1)	see 2nd game	75–47–3
126	August 28 (2)	@ Cubs	9–5	**Jim Konstanty** (12–4)	Johnny Klippstein (1–8)	None	19,756	76–47–3
127	August 29	@ Cardinals	5–3	**Robin Roberts** (18–6)	Howie Pollet (12–11)	**Jim Konstanty** (21)	27,058	77–47–3
128	August 30	@ Cardinals	9–8	**Jim Konstanty** (13–4)	Gerry Staley (11–11)	**Curt Simmons** (1)	17,232	78–47–3

September (12–16)

#	Date	Opponent	Score	Win	Loss	Save	Attendance	Record
129	September 1	@ Braves	7–3	**Bubba Church** (8–2)	Max Surkont (2–1)	None	14,908	79–47–3
130	September 2	@ Braves	2–0	**Curt Simmons** (17–8)	Johnny Sain (17–11)	None	17,230	80–47–3
–	September 3	@ Braves	Postponed (rain); Makeup: September 25 as a traditional double-header					
131	September 4 (1)	Giants	0–2	Jim Hearn (8–2)	**Robin Roberts** (18–7)	None	see 2nd game	80–48–3
132	September 4 (2)	Giants	0–9	Sal Maglie (14–3)	**Bob Miller** (11–4)	None	33,988	80–49–3
133	September 6 (1)	Dodgers	0–2	Don Newcombe (17–8)	**Bubba Church** (8–3)	None	see 2nd game	80–50–3
134	September 6 (2)	Dodgers	2–3	Dan Bankhead (7–4)	**Jim Konstanty** (13–5)	None	32,279	80–51–3
135	September 7	Dodgers	2–3	Carl Erskine (3–4)	**Robin Roberts** (18–8)	Ralph Branca (6)	24,624	80–52–3
136	September 8	Dodgers	4–3	**Russ Meyer** (8–11)	Erv Palica (8–7)	None	14,727	81–52–3
137	September 9	Braves	7–6	**Jim Konstanty** (14–5)	Dave Cole (0–1)	None	15,329	82–52–3
138	September 10	Braves	1–3 (5)	Johnny Sain (18–12)	**Bubba Church** (8–4)	None	14,684	82–53–3
139	September 12	Cardinals	1–0	**Robin Roberts** (19–8)	Max Lanier (11–7)	None	20,864	83–53–3
–	September 13	Cardinals	Postponed (rain); Makeup: September 14					
140	September 14	Cardinals	3–2	**Jim Konstanty** (15–5)	Al Brazle (10–7)	None	17,142	84–53–3
141	September 15 (1)	Reds	2–1	**Ken Heintzelman** (2–8)	Willie Ramsdell (8–13)	None	see 2nd game	85–53–3
142	September 15 (2)	Reds	8–7 (19)	**Blix Donnelly** (1–4)	Eddie Erautt (3–2)	None	20,673	86–53–3
143	September 16	Reds	0–2	Ewell Blackwell (15–15)	**Bob Miller** (11–5)	None	12,052	86–54–3
144	September 17	Pirates	5–3	**Russ Meyer** (9–11)	Bill Werle (8–14)	**Jim Konstanty** (22)	20,031	87–54–3
145	September 19	Cubs	0–1	Frank Hiller (11–5)	**Robin Roberts** (19–9)	None	20,404	87–55–3
146	September 20	Cubs	9–6	**Jim Konstanty** (16–5)	Johnny Schmitz (10–15)	None	4,259	88–55–3
147	September 23	Dodgers	2–3	Don Newcombe (19–10)	**Robin Roberts** (19–10)	None	22,602	88–56–3
148	September 24	Dodgers	0–11	Erv Palica (12–7)	**Bubba Church** (8–5)	None	32,190	88–57–3
149	September 25 (1)	@ Braves	12–4	**Ken Heintzelman** (3–8)	Warren Spahn (21–16)	None	see 2nd game	89–57–3
150	September 25 (2)	@ Braves	3–5	Max Surkont (5–1)	**Jim Konstanty** (16–6)	None	7,451	89–58–3
151	September 26	@ Braves	8–7	**Blix Donnelly** (2–4)	Bob Hall (0–2)	None	1,987	90–58–3
152	September 27 (1)	@ Giants	7–8 (10)	Dave Koslo (13–15)	**Jim Konstanty** (16–7)	None	see 2nd game	90–59–3
153	September 27 (2)	@ Giants	0–5	Jim Hearn (11–4)	**Bubba Church** (8–6)	None	10,004	90–60–3
154	September 28 (1)	@ Giants	1–3	Sal Maglie (18–4)	**Ken Heintzelman** (3–9)	None	see 2nd game	90–61–3
155	September 28 (2)	@ Giants	1–3	Sheldon Jones (13–16)	**Robin Roberts** (19–11)	None	7,984	90–62–3
156	September 30	@ Dodgers	3–7	Erv Palica (13–8)	**Bob Miller** (11–6)	None	23,879	90–63–3

October (1–0)

#	Date	Opponent	Score	Win	Loss	Save	Attendance	Record
157	October 1	@ Dodgers	4–1 (10)	**Robin Roberts** (20–11)	Don Newcombe (19–11)	None	35,073	91–63–3

^{^[a]}The April 21, 1950, game ended after seven innings with the score tied 2–2, and an additional game was played on June 29.
^{^[b]}The April 26, 1950, game was protested by the Phillies in the bottom of the tenth inning. The protest was later denied.
^{^[c]}The second game on May 14 was suspended (Sunday curfew) after eight innings with the score 9–7 and was completed July 5, 1950, with new umpires.
^{^[d]}The second game on July 2, 1950, ended after ten innings (Sunday curfew) with the score tied 8–8, and an additional game was played on September 6.
^{^[e]}The August 12, 1950, game was protested by the Giants in the bottom of the fourth inning. The protest was later denied.
^{^[f]}The second game on August 27, 1950, ended after eleven innings with the score tied 4–4, and an additional game was played on August 28.

=== Roster ===
1950 Philadelphia Phillies
**Roster**
**Pitchers**: 20 Hank Borowy; 41 Jack Brittin; 18 Milo Candini; 23 Bubba Church; 30 Blix Donnelly; 27 Ken Heintzelman; 39 Ken Johnson; 35 Jim Konstanty; 34 Russ Meyer; 19 Bob Miller; 20 Steve Ridzik; 36 Robin Roberts; 28 Curt Simmons; 39 Paul Stuffel; 33 Jocko Thompson	**Catchers**: 29 Stan Lopata; 21 Andy Seminick; 25 Ken Silvestri; **Infielders**: 5 Jimmy Bloodworth; 3 Putsy Caballero; 9 Mike Goliat; 2 Granny Hamner; 6 Willie Jones; 4 Eddie Waitkus	**Outfielders**: 1 Richie Ashburn; 16 Johnny Blatnik; 14 Del Ennis; 17 Stan Hollmig; 15 Jackie Mayo; 12 Bill Nicholson; 8 Dick Sisler; 37 Dick Whitman	**Manager**: 24 Eddie Sawyer; **Coaches**: 11 Benny Bengough; 32 Dusty Cooke; 38 George Earnshaw; 40 Maje McDonnell; 31 Cy Perkins

== Player stats ==
= Indicates team leader

= Indicates league leader

=== Batting ===
==== Starters by position ====
Note: Pos = Position; G = Games played; AB = At bats; H = Hits; R = Runs; Avg. = Batting average; HR = Home runs; RBI = Runs batted in

Pos	Player	G	AB	H	R	Avg.	HR	RBI
C	Andy Seminick	130	393	113	55	.288	24	68
1B	Eddie Waitkus	154	641	182	102	.284	2	44
2B	Mike Goliat	145	483	113	49	.234	13	64
3B	Willie Jones	157	610	163	100	.267	25	88
SS	Granny Hamner	157	637	172	78	.270	11	82
OF	Dick Sisler	141	523	155	79	.296	13	83
OF	Del Ennis	153	595	185	92	.311	31	128
OF	Richie Ashburn	151	594	180	84	.303	2	41

==== Other batters ====
Note: G = Games played; AB = At bats; H = Hits; Avg. = Batting average; HR = Home runs; RBI = Runs batted in

Player	G	AB	H	Avg.	HR	RBI
Dick Whitman	75	132	33	.250	0	12
Stan Lopata	58	129	27	.209	1	11
Jimmy Bloodworth	54	96	22	.229	0	13
Bill Nicholson	41	58	13	.224	3	10
Jackie Mayo	18	36	8	.222	0	3
Putsy Caballero	46	24	4	.167	0	0
Ken Silvestri	11	20	5	.250	0	4
Stan Hollmig	11	12	3	.250	0	1
Johnny Blatnik	4	4	1	.250	0	0

=== Pitching ===
= Indicates league leader

==== Starting pitchers ====
Note: G = Games pitched; IP = Innings pitched; W = Wins; L = Losses; ERA = Earned run average; SO = Strikeouts

Player	G	IP	W	L	ERA	SO
Robin Roberts	40	304.1	20	11	3.02	146
Curt Simmons	31	214.2	17	8	3.40	146
Russ Meyer	32	159.2	9	11	5.30	74
Ken Heintzelman	23	125.1	3	9	4.09	39

==== Other pitchers ====
Note: G = Games pitched; IP = Innings pitched; W = Wins; L = Losses; ERA = Earned run average; SO = Strikeouts

Player	G	IP	W	L	ERA	SO
Bob Miller	35	172.0	11	6	3.57	44
Bubba Church	31	142.0	8	6	2.73	50
Ken Johnson	14	60.2	4	1	4.01	32

==== Relief pitchers ====
Note: G = Games pitched; W = Wins; L = Losses; SV = Saves; ERA = Earned run average; SO = Strikeouts

Player	G	W	L	SV	ERA	SO
Jim Konstanty	74	16	7	22	2.66	56
Milo Candini	18	1	0	0	2.70	10
Blix Donnelly	14	2	4	0	4.29	10
Hank Borowy	3	0	0	0	5.68	3
Paul Stuffel	3	0	0	0	1.80	3
Jack Brittin	3	0	0	0	4.50	3
Jocko Thompson	2	0	0	0	0.00	2
Steve Ridzik	1	0	0	0	6.00	2

== 1950 World Series ==
AL New York Yankees (4) vs. NL Philadelphia Phillies (0)

Game	Score	Date	Location	Attendance
1	Yankees – 1, Phillies – 0	October 4	Shibe Park	30,746
2	Yankees – 2, Phillies – 1 (10 innings)	October 5	Shibe Park	32,660
3	Phillies – 2, Yankees – 3	October 6	Yankee Stadium	64,505
4	Phillies – 2, Yankees – 5	October 7	Yankee Stadium	68,098

== Awards and honors ==
- Jim Konstanty, Associated Press Athlete of the Year, National League MVP
- Eddie Sawyer, Associated Press Manager of the Year.
- Eddie Waitkus, Associated Press Comeback Player of the Year.

The Phillies would celebrate and honor the 1950 team in subsequent years.

The 1950 team was honored with a parade through Center City, Philadelphia on June 5, 1963 and luncheon at the Warwick Hotel with Philadelphia Mayor James Tate, MLB Commission Ford Frick, and National League President Warren Giles. That evening the 1950 players faced the 1963 Phillies in an exhibition at Connie Mack Stadium prior to the game against the St. Louis Cardinals. The Phillies recognized the team on August 16, 1975 for its 25th anniversary, presented the players with World Series rings, and staged an old-timers game prior to the team's matchup with the San Diego Padres. The organization celebrated the 50th anniversary of the team on August 8, 2000 prior to the Phillies game against the Baltimore Orioles.

=== Records ===
- Jim Konstanty, Major league single-season record (since broken), most wins by a relief pitcher (16)

== Farm system ==
Level	Team	League	Manager
AAA	Toronto Maple Leafs	International League	Jack Sanford
A	Utica Blue Sox	Eastern League	Leon Riley
B	Terre Haute Phillies	Illinois–Indiana–Iowa League	Dan Carnevale
B	Wilmington Blue Rocks	Interstate League	Skeeter Newsome
C	Schenectady Blue Jays	Canadian–American League	Dick Carter
C	Vandergrift Pioneers	Middle Atlantic League	Don Hasenmayer
C	Salina Blue Jays	Western Association	John Davenport
D	Klamath Falls Gems	Far West League	Hub Kittle
D	Americus Phillies	Georgia–Florida League	Eddie Murphy
D	Carbondale Pioneers	North Atlantic League	Joe Glenn
D	Lima Phillies	Ohio–Indiana League	Frank McCormick
D	Bradford Phillies	PONY League	Barney Lutz

LEAGUE CHAMPIONS: Terre Haute, Wilmington

Vandergrift club folded, July 20, 1950
