= 1950 Chicago Cubs season =

1950 Chicago Cubs
- League: National League
- Ballpark: Wrigley Field
- City: Chicago
- Record: 64–89 (.418)
- League place: 7th
- Owners: Philip K. Wrigley
- General managers: Wid Matthews
- Managers: Frankie Frisch
- Television: WGN-TV (Jack Brickhouse, Harry Creighton, Vince Lloyd); WBKB (Joe Wilson)
- Radio: WIND (Bert Wilson, Bud Campbell)

The 1950 Chicago Cubs season was the 79th season of the Chicago Cubs franchise, the 75th in the National League and the 35th at Wrigley Field. The Cubs finished seventh in the National League with a record of 64–89.

== Offseason ==
- October 29, 1949: Jim Fanning was signed as an amateur free agent by the Chicago Cubs.

== Regular season ==
=== Season standings ===
National League
Team	W	L	Pct.	GB	Home	Road
Philadelphia Phillies	91	63	.591	—	48‍–‍29	43‍–‍34
Brooklyn Dodgers	89	65	.578	2	48‍–‍30	41‍–‍35
New York Giants	86	68	.558	5	44‍–‍32	42‍–‍36
Boston Braves	83	71	.539	8	46‍–‍31	37‍–‍40
St. Louis Cardinals	78	75	.510	12½	48‍–‍28	30‍–‍47
Cincinnati Reds	66	87	.431	24½	38‍–‍38	28‍–‍49
Chicago Cubs	64	89	.418	26½	35‍–‍42	29‍–‍47
Pittsburgh Pirates	57	96	.373	33½	33‍–‍44	24‍–‍52

=== Record vs. opponents ===
1950 National League record Sources:
Team	BSN	BRO	CHC	CIN	NYG	PHI	PIT	STL
Boston	—	9–13	9–13	17–5	13–9	9–13–1	15–7–1	11–11
Brooklyn	13–9	—	10–12	12–10	12–10	11–11–1	19–3	12–10
Chicago	13–9	12–10	—	4–17	5–17	9–13–1	11–11	10–12
Cincinnati	5–17	10–12	17–4	—	11–11	4–18	12–10	7–15
New York	9–13	10–12	17–5	11–11	—	12–10	16–6	11–11
Philadelphia	13–9–1	11–11–1	13–9–1	18–4	10–12	—	14–8	12–10
Pittsburgh	7–15–1	3–19	11–11	10–12	6–16	8–14	—	12–9
St. Louis	11–11	10–12	12–10	15–7	11–11	10–12	9–12	—

=== Notable transactions ===
- April 1, 1950: Gene Baker was signed as an amateur free agent by the Cubs.
- June 29, 1950: Harry Chiti was signed as an amateur free agent by the Cubs.

== Roster ==
1950 Chicago Cubs
Roster
Pitchers: 26 Monk Dubiel; 18 Warren Hacker; 30,45 Frank Hiller; 36 Johnny Klippstein; 23 Doyle Lade; 20 Dutch Leonard; 24 Paul Minner; 17 Bob Rush; 53 Johnny Schmitz; 34 Johnny Vander Meer; 33 Andy Varga; 96 Bill Voiselle	Catchers: 32 Harry Chiti; 12 Mickey Owen; 11 Carl Sawatski; 10 Bob Scheffing; 8 Rube Walker; Infielders: 44 Phil Cavarretta; 2 Randy Jackson; 5 Bob Ramazzotti; 6 Bill Serena; 39 Roy Smalley Jr.; 21 Wayne Terwilliger; 7 Emil Verban; 29 Preston Ward	Outfielders: 22 Bob Borkowski; 16 Hank Edwards; 4 Hal Jeffcoat; 41 Carmen Mauro; 10 Ron Northey; 48 Andy Pafko; 9 Hank Sauer	Manager: 3 Frankie Frisch; Coaches: 49 Bill Baker; 47 Spud Davis; 42 Roy Johnson

== Player stats ==
=== Batting ===
==== Starters by position ====
Note: Pos = Position; G = Games played; AB = At bats; H = Hits; Avg. = Batting average; HR = Home runs; RBI = Runs batted in

Pos	Player	G	AB	H	Avg.	HR	RBI
C	Mickey Owen	86	259	63	.243	2	21
1B	Preston Ward	80	285	72	.253	6	33
2B	Wayne Terwilliger	133	480	116	.242	10	32
SS	Roy Smalley Jr.	154	557	128	.230	21	85
3B	Bill Serena	127	435	104	.239	17	61
OF	Bob Borkowski	85	256	70	.273	4	29
OF	Andy Pafko	146	514	156	.304	36	92
OF	Hank Sauer	145	540	148	.274	32	103

==== Other batters ====
Note: G = Games played; AB = At bats; H = Hits; Avg. = Batting average; HR = Home runs; RBI = Runs batted in

Player	G	AB	H	Avg.	HR	RBI
Phil Cavarretta	82	256	70	.273	10	31
Rube Walker	74	213	49	.230	6	16
Carmen Mauro	62	185	42	.227	1	10
Hal Jeffcoat	66	179	42	.235	2	18
Bob Ramazzotti	61	145	38	.262	1	6
Ron Northey	53	114	32	.281	4	20
Randy Jackson	34	111	25	.225	3	6
Hank Edwards	41	110	40	.364	2	21
Carl Sawatski	38	103	18	.175	1	7
Emil Verban	45	37	4	.108	0	1
Bob Scheffing	12	16	3	.188	0	1
Harry Chiti	3	6	2	.333	0	0

=== Pitching ===
==== Starting pitchers ====
Note: G = Games pitched; IP = Innings pitched; W = Wins; L = Losses; ERA = Earned run average; SO = Strikeouts

Player	G	IP	W	L	ERA	SO
Bob Rush	39	254.2	13	20	3.71	93
Johnny Schmitz	39	193.0	10	16	4.99	75
Paul Minner	39	190.1	8	13	4.11	99

==== Other pitchers ====
Note: G = Games pitched; IP = Innings pitched; W = Wins; L = Losses; ERA = Earned run average; SO = Strikeouts

Player	G	IP	W	L	ERA	SO
Frank Hiller	38	153.0	12	5	3.53	55
Monk Dubiel	39	142.2	6	10	4.16	51
Doyle Lade	34	117.2	5	6	4.74	36
Johnny Klippstein	33	104.2	2	9	5.25	51
Johnny Vander Meer	32	73.2	3	4	3.79	41
Bill Voiselle	19	51.1	0	4	5.79	25
Warren Hacker	5	15.1	0	1	5.28	5

==== Relief pitchers ====
Note: G = Games pitched; W = Wins; L = Losses; SV = Saves; ERA = Earned run average; SO = Strikeouts

Player	G	W	L	SV	ERA	SO
Dutch Leonard	35	5	1	6	3.77	28
Andy Varga	1	0	0	0	0.00	0

== Minor Leagues ==
Level	Team	League	Manager
AAA	Springfield Cubs	International League	Stan Hack
AAA	Los Angeles Angels	Pacific Coast League	Bill Kelly
AA	Nashville Vols	Southern Association	Don Osborn
A	Grand Rapids Jets	Central League	Jack Knight
A	Des Moines Bruins	Western League	Charlie Root
B	Decatur Commodores	Illinois–Indiana–Iowa League	Morrie Arnovich
B	Rock Hill Chiefs	Tri-State League	Dick Bouknight
C	Visalia Cubs	California League	Jim Acton
C	Sioux Falls Canaries	Northern League	Lee Eilbracht
C	Springfield Cubs	Western Association	Bob Peterson
C	Clovis Pioneers	West Texas–New Mexico League	Paul Dean, Harold Hoffman, Ray Bauer and Chuck Bushong
D	Moultrie Cubs	Georgia–Florida League	Steve Collins and Jim Trew
D	Carthage Cubs	Kansas–Oklahoma–Missouri League	Donald Anderson
D	Rutherford County Owls	Western Carolina League	Halley Wilson
D	Janesville Cubs	Wisconsin State League	Adolph Matulis

LEAGUE CHAMPIONS: Nashville, Rock Hill, Sioux Falls
