= 1950 Pittsburgh Pirates season =

1950 Pittsburgh Pirates
- League: National League
- Ballpark: Forbes Field
- City: Pittsburgh, Pennsylvania
- Owners: Frank E. McKinney, John W. Galbreath, Bing Crosby, Thomas P. Johnson
- General managers: Roy Hamey
- Managers: Billy Meyer
- Radio: WWSW; Rosey Rowswell, Bob Prince

The 1950 Pittsburgh Pirates season was the 69th season of the Pittsburgh Pirates franchise; the 64th in the National League. The Pirates finished eighth and last in the league standings with a record of 57–96.

== Regular season ==
=== Season standings ===
National League
Team	W	L	Pct.	GB	Home	Road
Philadelphia Phillies	91	63	.591	—	48‍–‍29	43‍–‍34
Brooklyn Dodgers	89	65	.578	2	48‍–‍30	41‍–‍35
New York Giants	86	68	.558	5	44‍–‍32	42‍–‍36
Boston Braves	83	71	.539	8	46‍–‍31	37‍–‍40
St. Louis Cardinals	78	75	.510	12½	48‍–‍28	30‍–‍47
Cincinnati Reds	66	87	.431	24½	38‍–‍38	28‍–‍49
Chicago Cubs	64	89	.418	26½	35‍–‍42	29‍–‍47
Pittsburgh Pirates	57	96	.373	33½	33‍–‍44	24‍–‍52

=== Record vs. opponents ===
1950 National League record Sources:
Team	BSN	BRO	CHC	CIN	NYG	PHI	PIT	STL
Boston	—	9–13	9–13	17–5	13–9	9–13–1	15–7–1	11–11
Brooklyn	13–9	—	10–12	12–10	12–10	11–11–1	19–3	12–10
Chicago	13–9	12–10	—	4–17	5–17	9–13–1	11–11	10–12
Cincinnati	5–17	10–12	17–4	—	11–11	4–18	12–10	7–15
New York	9–13	10–12	17–5	11–11	—	12–10	16–6	11–11
Philadelphia	13–9–1	11–11–1	13–9–1	18–4	10–12	—	14–8	12–10
Pittsburgh	7–15–1	3–19	11–11	10–12	6–16	8–14	—	12–9
St. Louis	11–11	10–12	12–10	15–7	11–11	10–12	9–12	—

=== Game log ===
1950 Game Log: 57–96 (Home: 33–44; Away: 24–52)
April: 6–5 (Home: 4–1; Away: 2–4)

#	Date	Opponent	Score	Win	Loss	Save	Attendance	Record
1	April 18	@ Cardinals	2–4	Staley	**Chesnes** (0–1)	—	20,871	0–1
2	April 19	@ Cardinals	4–3	**Chambers** (1–0)	Munger	—	5,648	1–1
3	April 20	@ Cardinals	8–4	**Dickson** (1–0)	Pollet	—	4,235	2–1
4	April 21	Reds	7–5	**Werle** (1–0)	Wehmeier	**Lombardi** (1)	32,685	3–1
5	April 22	Reds	9–2	**Chesnes** (1–1)	Hetki	—	14,533	4–1
6	April 23	Reds	5–3	**Chambers** (2–0)	Smith	—	18,049	5–1
7	April 27	Cardinals	2–5	Munger	**Dickson** (1–1)	—	34,995	5–2
8	April 28	Cardinals	4–3	**Werle** (2–0)	Staley	**Main** (1)	10,102	6–2
9	April 29	@ Reds	6–14	Erautt	**Chesnes** (1–2)	—	4,895	6–3
10	April 30	@ Reds	2–4	Fox	**Chambers** (2–1)	Wehmeier		6–4
11	April 30	@ Reds	1–2	Blackwell	**Queen** (0–1)	—	10,759	6–5

May: 10–18 (Home: 4–11; Away: 6–7)

#	Date	Opponent	Score	Win	Loss	Save	Attendance	Record
12	May 2	Braves	6–1	**Dickson** (2–1)	Spahn	—	24,115	7–5
13	May 3	Braves	4–15	Sain	**Lombardi** (0–1)	—	9,389	7–6
14	May 4	Giants	3–1	**Chambers** (3–1)	Jansen	—	6,680	8–6
15	May 5	Giants	5–4	**Queen** (1–1)	Jones	**Werle** (1)	31,785	9–6
16	May 6	Giants	8–9	Maglie	**Lombardi** (0–2)	Hansen	13,577	9–7
17	May 7	Dodgers	2–3	Barney	**Dickson** (2–2)	Erskine	33,734	9–8
18	May 8	Dodgers	5–7	Podbielan	**Chambers** (3–2)	Banta	9,476	9–9
19	May 9	Dodgers	10–5	**Werle** (3–0)	Palica	—	26,734	10–9
20	May 11	Phillies	2–3	Roberts	**Dickson** (2–3)	—	28,452	10–10
21	May 12	@ Cubs	3–6	Rush	**Gregg** (0–1)	—	8,763	10–11
22	May 13	@ Cubs	3–4	Hiller	**Chambers** (3–3)	Dubiel	25,453	10–12
23	May 14	@ Cubs	6–5	**Chesnes** (2–2)	Leonard	**Werle** (2)		11–12
24	May 14	@ Cubs	16–9	**Main** (1–0)	Lade	**Werle** (3)	34,659	12–12
25	May 16	@ Braves	0–3	Sain	**Dickson** (2–4)	—	10,273	12–13
26	May 17	@ Braves	4–1	**Chambers** (4–3)	Bickford	—	13,384	13–13
27	May 20	@ Dodgers	2–3	Banta	**Queen** (1–2)	—		13–14
28	May 20	@ Dodgers	3–4 (11)	Bankhead	**Werle** (3–1)	—	20,311	13–15
29	May 21	@ Giants	4–2	**Chesnes** (3–2)	Jansen	—		14–15
30	May 21	@ Giants	8–6	**Chambers** (5–3)	Jones	**Werle** (4)	34,972	15–15
31	May 23	@ Phillies	6–0	**Macdonald** (1–0)	Meyer	—	12,428	16–15
32	May 24	@ Phillies	3–6	Konstanty	**Werle** (3–2)	—	18,993	16–16
33	May 25	@ Phillies	0–3	Miller	**Chambers** (5–4)	—	5,265	16–17
34	May 26	Cubs	0–4	Hiller	**Queen** (1–3)	—	22,526	16–18
35	May 27	Cubs	5–7	Minner	**Chesnes** (3–3)	Leonard	10,220	16–19
36	May 28	Cubs	0–6	Schmitz	**Dickson** (2–5)	—		16–20
37	May 28	Cubs	1–5	Rush	**Lombardi** (0–3)	—	23,873	16–21
38	May 30	Cardinals	13–17	Staley	**Werle** (3–3)	Brazle		16–22
39	May 30	Cardinals	5–8	Staley	**Dickson** (2–6)	—	33,182	16–23

June: 7–18 (Home: 4–9; Away: 3–9)

#	Date	Opponent	Score	Win	Loss	Save	Attendance	Record
40	June 1	Braves	2–14	Bickford	**Queen** (1–4)	—	5,468	16–24
41	June 2	Braves	5–4	**Macdonald** (2–0)	Spahn	—	23,549	17–24
42	June 3	Braves	6–10	Sain	**Lombardi** (0–4)	Hogue	5,737	17–25
43	June 4	Giants	3–4	Maglie	**Chambers** (5–5)	Kennedy	14,534	17–26
44	June 5	Giants	4–5 (10)	Koslo	**Walsh** (0–1)	Hansen	16,733	17–27
45	June 6	Giants	4–10	Kramer	**Queen** (1–5)	—	5,111	17–28
46	June 7	Dodgers	0–9	Newcombe	**Macdonald** (2–1)	—	30,904	17–29
47	June 8	Dodgers	4–3	**Chambers** (6–5)	Branca	**Werle** (5)	22,697	18–29
48	June 9	Dodgers	7–9	Podbielan	**Werle** (3–4)	Newcombe	9,510	18–30
49	June 11	Phillies	6–7	Konstanty	**Law** (0–1)	—		18–31
50	June 11	Phillies	5–4 (12)	**Werle** (4–4)	Donnelly	—	33,217	19–31
51	June 13	@ Giants	0–7	Jansen	**Chambers** (6–6)	—	15,088	19–32
52	June 16	@ Braves	5–6	Sain	**Queen** (1–6)	—	15,866	19–33
53	June 17	@ Braves	6–15	Hogue	**Borowy** (0–1)	—	6,272	19–34
54	June 18	@ Braves	6–8	Roy	**Dickson** (2–7)	—		19–35
55	June 18	@ Braves	8–8			—	22,817	19–35
56	June 19	@ Braves	1–0	**Chambers** (7–6)	Spahn	—	5,578	20–35
57	June 20	@ Phillies	3–7	Meyer	**Law** (0–2)	—	13,597	20–36
58	June 21	@ Phillies	5–3	**Macdonald** (3–1)	Roberts	**Werle** (6)	18,632	21–36
59	June 22	@ Phillies	4–7	Miller	**Borowy** (0–2)	—	5,326	21–37
60	June 23	@ Dodgers	3–15	Podbielan	**Dickson** (2–8)	—	25,519	21–38
61	June 24	@ Dodgers	12–21	Roe	**Werle** (4–5)	—	22,010	21–39
62	June 25	@ Dodgers	16–11	**Chambers** (8–6)	Branca	**Macdonald** (1)	20,196	22–39
63	June 27	Reds	3–8	Wehmeier	**Macdonald** (3–2)	Blackwell	13,500	22–40
64	June 28	Reds	6–5	**Dickson** (3–8)	Smith	—	12,040	23–40
65	June 30	@ Cardinals	4–9	Staley	**Chambers** (8–7)	—	12,631	23–41

July: 11–19 (Home: 8–8; Away: 3–11)

#	Date	Opponent	Score	Win	Loss	Save	Attendance	Record
66	July 1	@ Cardinals	4–5	Pollet	**Queen** (1–7)	Brazle	15,795	23–42
67	July 2	@ Cardinals	1–2	Munger	**Werle** (4–6)	Brazle	25,630	23–43
68	July 3	@ Reds	5–8	Ramsdell	**Dickson** (3–9)	Blackwell	3,405	23–44
69	July 4	@ Reds	4–8	Wehmeier	**Chambers** (8–8)	—		23–45
70	July 4	@ Reds	4–5	Fox	**Macdonald** (3–3)	—	10,728	23–46
71	July 5	@ Cubs	4–1	**Queen** (2–7)	Lade	—	10,815	24–46
72	July 6	@ Cubs	2–4	Minner	**Werle** (4–7)	—	12,953	24–47
73	July 7	Cardinals	9–1	**Law** (1–2)	Staley	—	28,468	25–47
74	July 8	Cardinals	7–6	**Dickson** (4–9)	Brecheen	—	15,224	26–47
75	July 9	Cardinals	3–2	**Queen** (3–7)	Lanier	**Werle** (7)	21,431	27–47
76	July 14	Giants	5–7	Maglie	**Chambers** (8–9)	—	29,323	27–48
77	July 15	Giants	2–1	**Werle** (5–7)	Jansen	—	11,958	28–48
78	July 16	Braves	5–9	Bickford	**Law** (1–3)	—		28–49
79	July 16	Braves	6–5	**Borowy** (1–2)	Hogue	—	29,363	29–49
80	July 17	Braves	6–8	Johnson	**Borowy** (1–3)	Hogue	21,450	29–50
81	July 18	Braves	3–11	Spahn	**Dickson** (4–10)	—	5,445	29–51
82	July 19	Phillies	2–3 (11)	Simmons	**Werle** (5–8)	Konstanty		29–52
83	July 19	Phillies	4–2	**Macdonald** (4–3)	Meyer	—	18,953	30–52
84	July 20	Phillies	10–8	**Dickson** (5–10)	Donnelly	—	7,291	31–52
85	July 21	Phillies	1–4	Church	**Queen** (3–8)	—	34,016	31–53
86	July 22	Dodgers	3–12	Branca	**Pierro** (0–1)	—	18,103	31–54
87	July 23	Dodgers	6–11	Barney	**Chambers** (8–10)	Newcombe	25,889	31–55
88	July 24	Phillies	2–1 (6)	**Macdonald** (5–3)	Miller	—	15,431	32–55
89	July 25	@ Braves	2–7	Sain	**Pierro** (0–2)	—	18,461	32–56
90	July 26	@ Braves	8–4	**Queen** (4–8)	Bickford	**Dickson** (1)	12,689	33–56
91	July 27	@ Braves	3–5	Spahn	**Chambers** (8–11)	—	8,302	33–57
92	July 28	@ Phillies	1–4	Miller	**Macdonald** (5–4)	—	7,343	33–58
93	July 29	@ Phillies	7–4	**Werle** (6–8)	Church	—	10,252	34–58
94	July 30	@ Phillies	0–10	Roberts	**Queen** (4–9)	—		34–59
95	July 30	@ Phillies	2–4	Konstanty	**Dickson** (5–11)	Meyer	21,411	34–60

August: 8–22 (Home: 5–14; Away: 3–8)

#	Date	Opponent	Score	Win	Loss	Save	Attendance	Record
96	August 1	@ Dodgers	1–3	Palica	**Chambers** (8–12)	—	16,691	34–61
97	August 2	@ Dodgers	4–5 (10)	Branca	**Dickson** (5–12)	—	6,361	34–62
98	August 4	@ Giants	2–3	Jones	**Law** (1–4)	Koslo	14,238	34–63
99	August 5	@ Giants	0–5	Hearn	**Queen** (4–10)	—	9,264	34–64
100	August 6	@ Giants	0–5	Jansen	**Werle** (6–9)	—	17,182	34–65
101	August 6	@ Giants	0–3	Maglie	**Dickson** (5–13)	—	17,182	34–66
102	August 8	Cardinals	4–6	Martin	**Chambers** (8–13)	—	18,243	34–67
103	August 10	Cubs	7–4	**Law** (2–4)	Minner	**Dickson** (2)	10,087	35–67
104	August 11	Cubs	1–3	Hiller	**Werle** (6–10)	—	11,082	35–68
105	August 12	Cubs	2–7	Rush	**Macdonald** (5–5)	—	6,770	35–69
106	August 13	Cubs	7–4	**Chambers** (9–13)	Schmitz	—		36–69
107	August 13	Cubs	2–0	**Queen** (5–10)	Dubiel	—	18,162	37–69
108	August 14	Reds	8–13	Smith	**Lombardi** (0–5)	—	4,306	37–70
109	August 15	Reds	10–9	**Macdonald** (6–5)	Hetki	—	5,495	38–70
110	August 16	@ Cardinals	5–3	**Law** (3–4)	Boyer	**Dickson** (3)	12,134	39–70
111	August 18	@ Cubs	9–3	**Chambers** (10–13)	Dubiel	—	3,823	40–70
112	August 19	@ Cubs	13–8	**Dickson** (6–13)	Rush	**Werle** (8)	13,290	41–70
113	August 20	@ Cubs	2–4	Minner	**Law** (3–5)	—		41–71
114	August 20	@ Cubs	2–5	Hiller	**Macdonald** (6–6)	—	29,589	41–72
115	August 21	Dodgers	2–3	Newcombe	**Werle** (6–11)	—	7,666	41–73
116	August 22	Dodgers	8–10	Palica	**Queen** (5–11)	Branca	19,526	41–74
117	August 23	Dodgers	5–7 (17)	Branca	**Queen** (5–12)	—	16,382	41–75
118	August 24	Phillies	2–4	Church	**Law** (3–6)	—	9,096	41–76
119	August 25	Phillies	7–9 (15)	Konstanty	**Chambers** (10–14)	—	25,686	41–77
120	August 26	Phillies	14–4	**Dickson** (7–13)	Roberts	—	12,157	42–77
121	August 27	Braves	3–7 (13)	Surkont	**Werle** (6–12)	—		42–78
122	August 27	Braves	1–4	Roy	**Queen** (5–13)	—	24,279	42–79
123	August 29	Giants	5–10	Jansen	**Law** (3–7)	—	13,850	42–80
124	August 30	Giants	0–4	Maglie	**Chambers** (10–15)	—	7,794	42–81
125	August 31	Giants	1–2	Hearn	**Macdonald** (6–7)	—	3,552	42–82

September: 14–13 (Home: 8–1; Away: 6–12)

#	Date	Opponent	Score	Win	Loss	Save	Attendance	Record
126	September 1	Cardinals	10–4	**Werle** (7–12)	Boyer	—	12,589	43–82
127	September 2	Cardinals	6–0	**Law** (4–7)	Staley	—	5,638	44–82
128	September 3	Cardinals	12–11 (10)	**Werle** (8–12)	Brecheen	—	12,736	45–82
129	September 4	Cubs	5–3	**Barrett** (1–0)	Dubiel	**Walsh** (1)		46–82
130	September 4	Cubs	3–0	**Macdonald** (7–7)	Rush	—	20,695	47–82
131	September 6	@ Reds	3–2	**Law** (5–7)	Blackwell	—	7,079	48–82
132	September 7	@ Reds	4–6 (10)	Erautt	**Barrett** (1–1)	—	1,176	48–83
133	September 9	@ Cardinals	5–4	**Dickson** (8–13)	Pollet	—	13,527	49–83
134	September 10	@ Cardinals	5–6 (10)	Wilks	**Barrett** (1–2)	—		49–84
135	September 10	@ Cardinals	6–2	**Macdonald** (8–7)	Dusak	—	12,436	50–84
136	September 12	@ Giants	0–3	Jones	**Werle** (8–13)	—	4,112	50–85
137	September 13	@ Giants	1–3 (7)	Maglie	**Law** (5–8)	—	11,684	50–86
138	September 14	@ Giants	7–1	**Dickson** (9–13)	Jansen	—	4,272	51–86
139	September 14	@ Giants	1–6	Hearn	**Macdonald** (8–8)	—		51–87
140	September 15	@ Braves	4–7	Surkont	**Queen** (5–14)	—	9,168	51–88
141	September 16	@ Braves	4–0 (12)	**Chambers** (11–15)	Bickford	—	4,606	52–88
142	September 17	@ Phillies	3–5	Meyer	**Werle** (8–14)	Konstanty	20,031	52–89
143	September 19	@ Dodgers	3–14	Newcombe	**Law** (5–9)	—		52–90
144	September 19	@ Dodgers	2–3	Palica	**Dickson** (9–14)	—	2,637	52–91
145	September 20	@ Dodgers	2–7	Erskine	**Macdonald** (8–9)	—	1,011	52–92
146	September 21	@ Dodgers	8–10	Palica	**Werle** (8–15)	—	5,241	52–93
147	September 22	Reds	8–7 (10)	**Walsh** (1–1)	Smith	—	12,979	53–93
148	September 23	Reds	8–7	**Law** (6–9)	Wehmeier	**Walsh** (2)	4,009	54–93
149	September 24	Reds	1–7	Blackwell	**Macdonald** (8–10)	—		54–94
150	September 24	Reds	3–2	**Dickson** (10–14)	Raffensberger	—	25,233	55–94
151	September 27	@ Cubs	7–4	**Law** (7–9)	Dubiel	—	4,783	56–94
152	September 30	@ Reds	2–5	Fox	**Werle** (8–16)	—	1,719	56–95

October: 1–1 (Home: 0–0; Away: 1–1)

#	Date	Opponent	Score	Win	Loss	Save	Attendance	Record
153	October 1	@ Reds	2–3	Erautt	**Dickson** (10–15)	—		56–96
154	October 1	@ Reds	3–1	**Chambers** (12–15)	Byerly	—	8,390	57–96

Legend: = Win = Loss = Tie
Bold = Pirates team member

=== Roster ===
1950 Pittsburgh Pirates
**Roster**
**Pitchers**: 38 Frank Barrett; 24 Hank Borowy; 23 Cliff Chambers; 24 Bob Chesnes; 22 Murry Dickson; 20 Hal Gregg; 37 Harry Gumbert; 20 Vern Law; 28 Vic Lombardi; 25 Bill Macdonald; 39 Woody Main; 40 Windy McCall; 30 Frank Papish; 13 Bill Pierro; 27 Mel Queen; 29 Junior Walsh; 19 Bill Werle	**Catchers**: 9 Ed Fitz Gerald; 8 Clyde McCullough; 9 Ray Mueller; 10 Earl Turner; **Infielders**: 10 Johnny Berardino; 16 Pete Castiglione; 3 Dale Coogan; 3 Bob Dillinger; 11 Nanny Fernandez; 12 Johnny Hopp; 7 Danny Murtaugh; 11 Danny O'Connell; 5 Jack Phillips; 6 Stan Rojek; 2 Hank Schenz; 37 Ed Stevens; 14 George Strickland	**Outfielders**: 17 Ted Beard; 18,21 Gus Bell; 4 Ralph Kiner; 13 Marv Rickert; 18,21 Tom Saffell; 15 Wally Westlake	**Manager**: 1 Billy Meyer; **Coaches**: 31 Frankie Gustine; 31 Goldie Holt; 32 Bill Posedel; 34 Johnny Riddle; 33 Honus Wagner

== Player stats ==
=== Batting ===
==== Starters by position ====
Note: Pos = Position; G = Games played; AB = At bats; H = Hits; Avg. = Batting average; HR = Home runs; RBI = Runs batted in

Pos	Player	G	AB	H	Avg.	HR	RBI
C	Clyde McCullough	103	279	71	.254	6	34
1B	Johnny Hopp	106	318	108	.340	8	47
2B	Danny Murtaugh	118	367	108	.294	2	37
SS	Danny O'Connell	79	315	92	.292	8	32
3B	Bob Dillinger	58	222	64	.288	1	9
OF	Gus Bell	111	422	119	.282	8	53
OF	Ralph Kiner	150	547	149	.272	47	118
OF	Wally Westlake	139	477	136	.285	24	95

==== Other batters ====
Note: G = Games played; AB = At bats; H = Hits; Avg. = Batting average; HR = Home runs; RBI = Runs batted in

Player	G	AB	H	Avg.	HR	RBI
Pete Castiglione	94	263	67	.255	3	22
Stan Rojek	76	230	59	.257	0	17
Jack Phillips	69	208	61	.293	5	34
Nanny Fernandez	65	198	51	.258	6	27
Tom Saffell	67	182	37	.203	2	6
Ted Beard	61	177	41	.232	4	12
Ray Mueller	67	156	42	.269	6	24
Johnny Berardino	40	131	27	.206	1	12
Dale Coogan	53	129	31	.240	1	13
Hank Schenz	58	101	23	.228	1	5
Earl Turner	40	74	18	.243	3	5
Ed Stevens	17	46	9	.196	0	3
George Strickland	23	27	3	.111	0	2
Marv Rickert	17	20	3	.150	0	0
Ed Fitz Gerald	6	15	1	.067	0	0

=== Pitching ===
==== Starting pitchers ====
Note: G = Games pitched; IP = Innings pitched; W = Wins; L = Losses; ERA = Earned run average; SO = Strikeouts

Player	G	IP	W	L	ERA	SO
Cliff Chambers	37	249.1	12	15	4.30	93
Bob Chesnes	9	49.0	3	3	5.54	12

==== Other pitchers ====
Note: G = Games pitched; IP = Innings pitched; W = Wins; L = Losses; ERA = Earned run average; SO = Strikeouts

Player	G	IP	W	L	ERA	SO
Murry Dickson	51	225.0	10	15	3.80	76
Bill Werle	48	215.1	8	16	4.60	78
Bill Macdonald	32	153.0	8	10	4.29	60
Vern Law	27	128.0	7	9	4.92	57
Mel Queen	33	120.1	5	14	5.98	76
Bill Pierro	12	29.0	0	2	10.55	13
Hank Borowy	11	25.1	1	3	6.39	9
Hal Gregg	5	5.1	0	1	13.50	3
Frank Papish	4	2.1	0	0	27.00	1

==== Relief pitchers ====
Note: G = Games pitched; W = Wins; L = Losses; SV = Saves; ERA = Earned run average; SO = Strikeouts

Player	G	W	L	SV	ERA	SO
Vic Lombardi	39	0	5	1	6.60	26
Junior Walsh	38	1	1	2	5.05	33
Woody Main	12	1	0	1	4.87	12
Frank Barrett	5	1	2	0	4.15	0
Windy McCall	2	0	0	0	9.45	5
Jack Phillips	1	0	0	0	7.20	2
Harry Gumbert	1	0	0	0	5.40	0

== Farm system ==
Level	Team	League	Manager
AAA	Indianapolis Indians	American Association	Al López
AA	New Orleans Pelicans	Southern Association	Hugh Luby and Bill Burwell
A	Albany Senators	Eastern League	Pinky May
A	Charleston Rebels	Sally League	Rip Sewell
B	Waco Pirates	Big State League	Buddy Hancken
B	York White Roses	Interstate League	Frank Oceak
C	Modesto Reds	California League	Marc Carrola
C	Hutchinson Elks	Western Association	Wes Griffin
D	Greenville Pirates	Alabama State League	Mickey O'Neil
D	Tallahassee Pirates	Georgia–Florida League	Walt Tauscher
D	Bartlesville Pirates	Kansas–Oklahoma–Missouri League	Tedd Gullic
D	Mayfield Clothiers	KITTY League	Jerry Gardner
D	Salisbury Pirates	North Carolina State League	George Detore

LEAGUE CHAMPIONS: Modesto, Hutchinson, Tallahassee, Mayfield
