= 1950 Cincinnati Reds season =

1950 Cincinnati Reds
- League: National League
- Ballpark: Crosley Field
- City: Cincinnati
- Owners: Powel Crosley Jr.
- General managers: Warren Giles
- Managers: Luke Sewell
- Television: WCPO-TV (Waite Hoyt)
- Radio: WCPO (Waite Hoyt)

The 1950 Cincinnati Reds season was a season in American baseball. The team finished sixth in the National League with a record of 66–87, 24 1/2 games behind the Philadelphia Phillies.

== Offseason ==
- December 14, 1949: Harry Walker was traded by the Reds to the St. Louis Cardinals for Lou Klein and Ron Northey.

== Regular season ==
=== Season standings ===
National League
Team	W	L	Pct.	GB	Home	Road
Philadelphia Phillies	91	63	.591	—	48‍–‍29	43‍–‍34
Brooklyn Dodgers	89	65	.578	2	48‍–‍30	41‍–‍35
New York Giants	86	68	.558	5	44‍–‍32	42‍–‍36
Boston Braves	83	71	.539	8	46‍–‍31	37‍–‍40
St. Louis Cardinals	78	75	.510	12½	48‍–‍28	30‍–‍47
Cincinnati Reds	66	87	.431	24½	38‍–‍38	28‍–‍49
Chicago Cubs	64	89	.418	26½	35‍–‍42	29‍–‍47
Pittsburgh Pirates	57	96	.373	33½	33‍–‍44	24‍–‍52

=== Record vs. opponents ===
1950 National League record Sources:
Team	BSN	BRO	CHC	CIN	NYG	PHI	PIT	STL
Boston	—	9–13	9–13	17–5	13–9	9–13–1	15–7–1	11–11
Brooklyn	13–9	—	10–12	12–10	12–10	11–11–1	19–3	12–10
Chicago	13–9	12–10	—	4–17	5–17	9–13–1	11–11	10–12
Cincinnati	5–17	10–12	17–4	—	11–11	4–18	12–10	7–15
New York	9–13	10–12	17–5	11–11	—	12–10	16–6	11–11
Philadelphia	13–9–1	11–11–1	13–9–1	18–4	10–12	—	14–8	12–10
Pittsburgh	7–15–1	3–19	11–11	10–12	6–16	8–14	—	12–9
St. Louis	11–11	10–12	12–10	15–7	11–11	10–12	9–12	—

=== Notable transactions ===
- June 20, 1950: Jim Bolger was signed as an amateur free agent by the Reds.
- September 7, 1950: Peanuts Lowrey was purchased from the Reds by the St. Louis Cardinals.

=== Roster ===
1950 Cincinnati Reds
Roster
Pitchers: 38 Jay Avrea; 47 Ewell Blackwell; 38 Bud Byerly; 34 Eddie Erautt; 43 Howie Fox; 33 Johnny Hetki; 35 Harry Perkowski; 30 Kent Peterson; 36 Ken Raffensberger; 40 Willie Ramsdell; 32 Frank Smith; 31 Herm Wehmeier	Catchers: 7 Walker Cooper; 6 Dixie Howell; 8 Hobie Landrith; 8 Johnny Pramesa; 7 Bob Scheffing; Infielders: 12 Bobby Adams; 11 Jimmy Bloodworth; 15 Grady Hatton; 18 Ted Kluszewski; 14 Sammy Meeks; 16 Connie Ryan; 10 Virgil Stallcup	Outfielders: 17 Joe Adcock; 23 Jim Bolger; 28 Danny Litwhiler; 21 Peanuts Lowrey; 20 Lloyd Merriman; 23 Ron Northey; 24 Bob Usher; 22 Johnny Wyrostek; Other batters: 25 Marv Rackley; 2 Ted Tappe	Manager: 50 Luke Sewell; Coaches: 51 Tony Cuccinello; 52 Gus Mancuso; 53 Phil Page

== Player stats ==
=== Batting ===
==== Starters by position ====
Note: Pos = Position; G = Games played; AB = At bats; H = Hits; Avg. = Batting average; HR = Home runs; RBI = Runs batted in

Pos	Player	G	AB	H	Avg.	HR	RBI
C	Dixie Howell	82	224	50	.223	2	22
1B	Ted Kluszewski	134	538	165	.307	25	111
2B	Connie Ryan	106	367	95	.259	3	43
SS	Virgil Stallcup	136	483	121	.251	8	54
3B	Grady Hatton	130	438	114	.260	11	54
OF	Joe Adcock	102	372	109	.293	8	55
OF	Johnny Wyrostek	131	509	145	.285	8	76
OF	Bob Usher	106	321	83	.259	6	35

==== Other batters ====
Note: G = Games played; AB = At bats; H = Hits; Avg. = Batting average; HR = Home runs; RBI = Runs batted in

Player	G	AB	H	Avg.	HR	RBI
Bobby Adams	115	348	98	.282	3	25
Lloyd Merriman	92	298	77	.258	2	31
Peanuts Lowrey	91	264	60	.227	1	11
Johnny Pramesa	74	228	70	.307	5	30
Danny Litwhiler	54	112	29	.259	6	12
Sammy Meeks	39	95	27	.284	1	8
Ron Northey	27	77	20	.260	5	9
Bob Scheffing	21	47	13	.277	2	6
Walker Cooper	15	47	9	.191	0	4
Hobie Landrith	4	14	3	.214	0	1
Jimmy Bloodworth	4	14	3	.214	0	1
Ted Tappe	7	5	1	.200	1	1
Marv Rackley	5	2	1	.500	0	1
Jim Bolger	2	1	0	.000	0	0

=== Pitching ===
==== Starting pitchers ====
Note: G = Games pitched; IP = Innings pitched; W = Wins; L = Losses; ERA = Earned run average; SO = Strikeouts

Player	G	IP	W	L	ERA	SO
Ewell Blackwell	40	261.0	17	15	2.97	188
Ken Raffensberger	38	239.0	14	19	4.26	87
Herm Wehmeier	41	230.0	10	18	5.67	121
Willie Ramsdell	27	157.1	7	12	3.72	83

==== Other pitchers ====
Note: G = Games pitched; IP = Innings pitched; W = Wins; L = Losses; ERA = Earned run average; SO = Strikeouts

Player	G	IP	W	L	ERA	SO
Howie Fox	34	187.0	11	8	4.33	64
Kent Peterson	9	20.0	0	3	7.20	6
Bud Byerly	4	14.2	0	1	2.45	5

==== Relief pitchers ====
Note: G = Games pitched; W = Wins; L = Losses; SV = Saves; ERA = Earned run average; SO = Strikeouts

Player	G	W	L	SV	ERA	SO
Frank Smith	38	2	7	3	3.87	55
Eddie Erautt	33	4	2	1	5.65	35
Johnny Hetki	22	1	2	0	5.09	21
Harry Perkowski	22	0	0	0	5.24	19
Jay Avrea	2	0	0	0	3.38	2

== Farm system ==
Level	Team	League	Manager
AAA	Syracuse Chiefs	International League	Bruno Betzel
AA	Tulsa Oilers	Texas League	Al Vincent
A	Charleston Senators	Central League	Joe Beggs
A	Columbia Reds	Sally League	Gee Walker
C	Ogden Reds	Pioneer League	Cecil Scheffel
D	Muncie Reds	Ohio–Indiana League	Mike Blazo
D	Lockport Reds	PONY League	Cyril Pfeifer
D	Wilmington Pirates	Tobacco State League	Bull Hamons, Red Teague and Steve Collins
