= 1950 Boston Braves season =

Major League Baseball season

1950 Boston Braves
- League: National League
- Ballpark: Braves Field
- City: Boston, Massachusetts
- Record: 83–71 (.539)
- League place: 4th
- Owners: Louis R. Perini
- General managers: John J. Quinn
- Managers: Billy Southworth
- Television: WNAC; WBZ-TV (Jim Britt, Tom Hussey, Bump Hadley)
- Radio: WHDH (Jim Britt, Tom Hussey, Leo Egan)

The 1950 Boston Braves season was the 80th season of the franchise. During the season, Sam Jethroe became the first black player in the history of the Braves.

== Offseason ==
- December 5, 1949: Phil Paine was selected by the Braves from the Philadelphia Phillies in the minor league draft.
- December 14, 1949: Eddie Stanky and Alvin Dark were traded by the Braves to the New York Giants for Sid Gordon, Buddy Kerr, Willard Marshall, and Red Webb.
- Prior to 1950 season: Art Fowler was acquired by the Braves from the Atlanta Crackers.

== Regular season ==
=== Season standings ===
National League
Team	W	L	Pct.	GB	Home	Road
Philadelphia Phillies	91	63	.591	—	48‍–‍29	43‍–‍34
Brooklyn Dodgers	89	65	.578	2	48‍–‍30	41‍–‍35
New York Giants	86	68	.558	5	44‍–‍32	42‍–‍36
Boston Braves	83	71	.539	8	46‍–‍31	37‍–‍40
St. Louis Cardinals	78	75	.510	12½	48‍–‍28	30‍–‍47
Cincinnati Reds	66	87	.431	24½	38‍–‍38	28‍–‍49
Chicago Cubs	64	89	.418	26½	35‍–‍42	29‍–‍47
Pittsburgh Pirates	57	96	.373	33½	33‍–‍44	24‍–‍52

=== Record vs. opponents ===
1950 National League record Sources:
Team	BSN	BRO	CHC	CIN	NYG	PHI	PIT	STL
Boston	—	9–13	9–13	17–5	13–9	9–13–1	15–7–1	11–11
Brooklyn	13–9	—	10–12	12–10	12–10	11–11–1	19–3	12–10
Chicago	13–9	12–10	—	4–17	5–17	9–13–1	11–11	10–12
Cincinnati	5–17	10–12	17–4	—	11–11	4–18	12–10	7–15
New York	9–13	10–12	17–5	11–11	—	12–10	16–6	11–11
Philadelphia	13–9–1	11–11–1	13–9–1	18–4	10–12	—	14–8	12–10
Pittsburgh	7–15–1	3–19	11–11	10–12	6–16	8–14	—	12–9
St. Louis	11–11	10–12	12–10	15–7	11–11	10–12	9–12	—

=== Roster ===
1950 Boston Braves
Roster
Pitchers: 34 Johnny Antonelli; 24 Vern Bickford; 17 Bob Chipman; 16 Dave Cole; 20,36 Dick Donovan; 22 Mickey Haefner; 25 Bob Hall; 37 Bobby Hogue; 19,50 Ernie Johnson; 39 Dick Manville; 26 Normie Roy; 33 Johnny Sain; 21 Warren Spahn; 36 Max Surkont; 6 Murray Wall; 31 Bucky Walters	Catchers: 14 Paul Burris; 39 Walker Cooper; 23 Del Crandall; 22 Walt Linden; Infielders: 3 Bob Elliott; 12 Roy Hartsfield; 10 Buddy Kerr; 2 Gene Mauch; 8 Connie Ryan; 7 Sibby Sisti; 9 Earl Torgeson; 18 Emil Verban	Outfielders: 6 Bob Addis; 4 Sid Gordon; 1 Tommy Holmes; 5 Sam Jethroe; 27 Willard Marshall; 15 Luis Olmo; 11 Pete Reiser	Manager: 30 Billy Southworth; Coaches: 29 Jimmy Brown; 28 Johnny Cooney; 35 Bob Keely; 31 Bucky Walters

== Player stats ==
= Indicates team leader

= Indicates league leader

=== Batting ===
==== Starters by position ====
Note: Pos = Position; G = Games played; AB = At bats; H = Hits; R = Runs; Avg. = Batting average; HR = Home runs; RBI = Runs batted in; SB = Stolen bases

Pos	Player	G	AB	H	R	Avg.	HR	RBI	SB
C	Walker Cooper	102	337	111	52	.329	14	60	1
1B	Earl Torgeson	156	576	167	120	.290	23	87	15
2B	Roy Hartsfield	107	419	116	62	.277	7	24	7
SS	Buddy Kerr	155	507	115	45	.227	2	46	0
3B	Bob Elliott	142	531	162	94	.305	24	107	2
OF	Sid Gordon	134	481	146	78	.304	27	103	2
OF	Sam Jethroe	141	582	159	100	.273	18	58	35
OF	Tommy Holmes	105	322	96	44	.298	9	51	0

==== Other batters ====
Note: G = Games played; AB = At bats; H = Hits; Avg. = Batting average; HR = Home runs; RBI = Runs batted in

Player	G	AB	H	Avg.	HR	RBI
Willard Marshall	105	298	70	.235	5	40
Del Crandall	79	255	56	.220	4	37
Luis Olmo	69	154	35	.227	5	22
Gene Mauch	48	121	28	.231	1	15
Sibby Sisti	69	105	18	.171	2	11
Pete Reiser	53	78	16	.205	1	10
Connie Ryan	20	72	14	.194	3	6
Bob Addis	16	28	7	.250	0	2
Paul Burris	10	23	4	.174	0	3
Walt Linden	3	5	2	.400	0	0
Emil Verban	4	5	0	.000	0	0

=== Pitching ===
==== Starting pitchers ====
Note: G = Games pitched; IP = Innings pitched; W = Wins; L = Losses; ERA = Earned run average; SO = Strikeouts

Player	G	IP	W	L	ERA	SO
Vern Bickford	40	311.2	19	14	3.47	126
Warren Spahn	41	293.0	21	17	3.16	191
Johnny Sain	37	278.1	20	13	3.94	96
Max Surkont	9	55.2	5	2	3.23	21

==== Other pitchers ====
Note: G = Games pitched; IP = Innings pitched; W = Wins; L = Losses; ERA = Earned run average; SO = Strikeouts

Player	G	IP	W	L	ERA	SO
Bob Chipman	27	124.0	7	7	4.43	40
Normie Roy	19	59.2	4	3	5.13	25
Johnny Antonelli	20	57.2	2	3	5.93	33
Bob Hall	21	50.1	0	2	6.97	22
Dick Donovan	10	29.2	0	2	8.19	9
Mickey Haefner	8	24.0	0	2	5.63	10

==== Relief pitchers ====
Note: G = Games pitched; W = Wins; L = Losses; SV = Saves; ERA = Earned run average; SO = Strikeouts

Player	G	W	L	SV	ERA	SO
Bobby Hogue	36	3	5	7	5.03	15
Ernie Johnson Sr.	16	2	0	0	6.97	15
Dave Cole	4	0	1	0	1.13	8
Murray Wall	1	0	0	0	9.00	2
Bucky Walters	1	0	0	0	4.50	0
Dick Manville	1	0	0	0	0.00	2

== Farm system ==
Level	Team	League	Manager
AAA	Milwaukee Brewers	American Association	Bob Coleman
AA	Atlanta Crackers	Southern Association	Dixie Walker
A	Hartford Chiefs	Eastern League	Ripper Collins
A	Denver Bears	Western League	Earl Browne
B	Evansville Braves	Illinois–Indiana–Iowa League	Ernie White
B	Hagerstown Braves	Interstate League	Dutch Dorman
B	Jackson Senators	Southeastern League	Willis Hudlin
C	Ventura Braves	California League	Gene Lillard
C	Eau Claire Bears	Northern League	Andy Cohen
D	Bluefield Blue-Grays	Appalachian League	Bill Adair
D	Owensboro Oilers	KITTY League	Travis Jackson
