= Ernest Thorwald Johnson =

Ernest Thorwald Johnson may refer to:

- Ernest Thorwald Johnson Jr. (born 1956), American sportscaster
- Ernest Thorwald Johnson Sr. (1924–2011), American baseball player and sports commentator
