= Jack Brittin =

American baseball player (1924-1994)

- Pitcher
- Born: March 4, 1924; Athens, Illinois, U.S.
- Died: January 5, 1994 (aged 69); Springfield, Illinois, U.S.
- Batted: Right Threw: Right

MLB debut
- September 15, 1950, for the Philadelphia Phillies

Last MLB appearance
- May 13, 1951, for the Philadelphia Phillies

MLB statistics
- Games pitched: 6
- Earned run average: 6.75
- Strikeouts: 6
- Innings pitched: 8
- Stats at Baseball Reference

Teams
- Philadelphia Phillies (1950–1951)

John Albert Brittin (March 4, 1924 – January 5, 1994) was an American professional baseball right-handed pitcher. He appeared briefly for the Philadelphia Phillies of Major League Baseball (MLB) in 1950 and 1951. Brittin was listed as 5 feet 11 inches (1.80 m) tall and 175 pounds (79 kg).

Born in Athens, Illinois, Brittin served in the United States Navy in the Pacific Theater of World War II, where he was an ensign aboard an Landing Ship, Tank during the Battle of Okinawa. Upon his discharge from the military, he attended the University of Illinois at Urbana–Champaign. His professional playing career extended from 1947 through 1954. In 1949, Brittin won 21 games for the Wilmington Blue Rocks of the Class B Interstate League. He was recalled by the pennant-bound 1950 Phillies in September from Triple-A. In Brittin's big league debut, he pitched a scoreless inning in a marathon, 19-inning victory over the Cincinnati Reds. Cincinnati was ahead, 5–2, when Brittin relieved Robin Roberts in the eighth. Brittin retired the Reds in order, then was removed for a pinch hitter. The Phillies tied the game in the ninth, and then again in the 18th frame, and won it 8–7 in their half of the 19th.

In six total games pitched in MLB, all in relief, Brittin had a 0–0 record with a 6.75 earned run average (ERA). He allowed seven hits, six earned runs, and nine bases on balls, in eight full innings pitched.

On January 5, 1994, Brittin died in Springfield, Illinois, at the age of 69.
