= Ernie Johnson (pitcher) =

American baseball player (1924–2011)

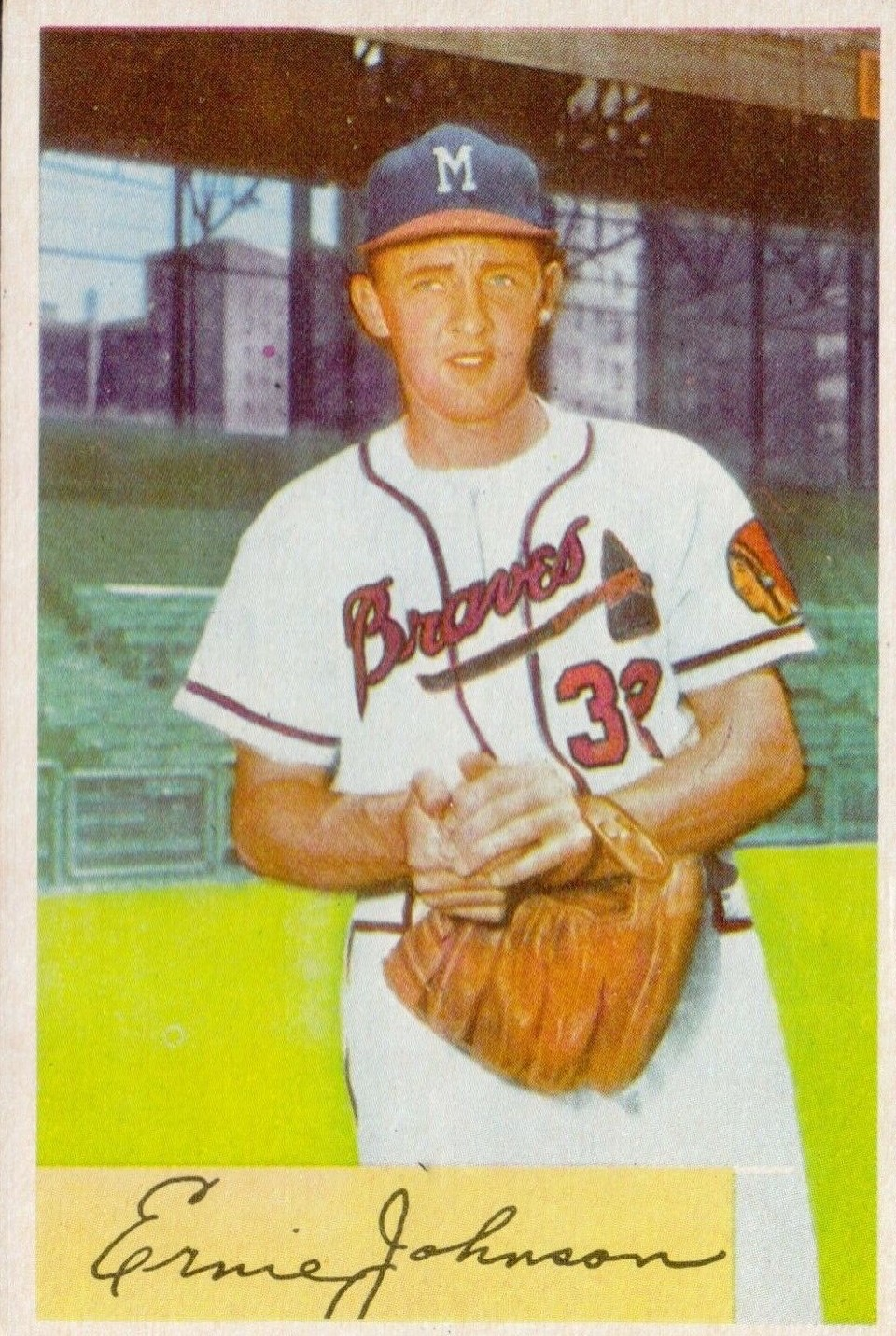
- Johnson on a 1954 Bowman baseball card
- Pitcher
- Born: June 16, 1924; Brattleboro, Vermont, U.S.
- Died: August 12, 2011 (aged 87); Atlanta, Georgia, U.S.
- Batted: Right Threw: Right

MLB debut
- April 28, 1950, for the Boston Braves

Last MLB appearance
- September 12, 1959, for the Baltimore Orioles

MLB statistics
- Win–loss record: 40–23
- Earned run average: 3.77
- Strikeouts: 319
- Stats at Baseball Reference

Teams
- Boston / Milwaukee Braves (1950, 1952–1958); Baltimore Orioles (1959)

Career highlights and awards
- World Series champion (1957); Braves Hall of Fame

Ernest Thorwald Johnson Sr. (June 16, 1924 – August 12, 2011) was an American professional baseball player and television sports color commentator. He played in Major League Baseball as a right-handed pitcher between 1950 and 1959. He played the majority of his career with the Boston Braves and remained with the team when they became the Milwaukee Braves in 1953. Johnson was a member of the world champion 1957 Milwaukee Braves. He played his final season with the Baltimore Orioles. After his playing career, he became a longtime television color commentator on the TBS television network. In 2001, Johnson was inducted into the Atlanta Braves Hall of Fame. He was the father of Inside the NBA sportscaster Ernie Johnson Jr.

== Baseball career ==
After serving three years in the U.S. Marine Corps, Johnson made his major league debut in relief on April 28, 1950, against the Philadelphia Phillies at Shibe Park. His first big league win was also in relief, coming against the New York Giants on June 30, 1950, at the Polo Grounds.

Johnson led Western League pitchers with a .750 winning percentage while playing for the Denver Bears in 1949. He spent part of 1950 in the Eastern League and all of 1951 in the American Association before returning to the major leagues for good in 1952. He led American Association pitchers with a .789 winning percentage and an ERA of 2.62 while playing for the Milwaukee Brewers in 1951. He started 10 games for Boston in 1952 and then appeared almost exclusively in relief thereafter.

From 1953 to 1957, the first five years that the Braves were in Milwaukee, Johnson made 175 relief appearances, an average of 35 per season.

Playing for the 1957 World Series Champion Braves, Johnson had a 7–3 record and four saves in 30 games. In three World Series appearances against the New York Yankees that October he gave up only one run and two hits and one walk in seven innings, but it happened to be a game-winning home run by Hank Bauer in the seventh inning of Game 6.

In nine seasons, Johnson had a losing record only once (1955) and had an overall winning percentage of .635. Career totals include a record of 40–23 in 273 games, 19 games started, three complete games, one shutout, 119 games finished, 19 saves, and an ERA of 3.77.

== Broadcasting career ==
Following his playing days Johnson was a longtime color commentator and play-by-play broadcaster on Braves radio and television, working from 1962 to 1999. He became an icon in Atlanta after the team moved there in 1966, and in the 1980s gained national exposure through his work with Skip Caray and Pete Van Wieren on "Superstation" TBS. He was elected to the Braves' Hall of Fame on August 24, 2001. His son, Ernie Johnson Jr., worked with him on SportSouth telecasts from 1993 to 1996. The broadcast booth at Atlanta's Truist Park bears his name. In 2014, Johnson was inducted into the Vermont Sports Hall of Fame.

== Death ==
Johnson died on August 12, 2011, after a long illness.
