= Paul Stuffel =

American baseball player (1927–2018)

- Pitcher
- Born: March 22, 1927; Canton, Ohio, U.S
- Died: September 9, 2018 (aged 91); Canton, Ohio, U.S.
- Batted: Right Threw: Right

MLB debut
- September 16, 1950, for the Philadelphia Phillies

Last MLB appearance
- May 24, 1953, for the Philadelphia Phillies

MLB statistics
- Win–loss record: 1–0
- Earned run average: 5.73
- Strikeouts: 6
- Innings pitched: 11
- Stats at Baseball Reference

Teams
- Philadelphia Phillies (1950, 1952–1953)

Paul Harrington Stuffel (March 22, 1927 – September 9, 2018) was an American professional baseball player, a right-handed pitcher who worked in seven games over portions of three Major League seasons for the Philadelphia Phillies.

== Biography ==
A native of Canton, Ohio, Stuffel attended Kent State University. He stood 6 feet 2 inches (1.88 m) tall and weighed 185 pounds (84 kg). Stuffel signed with Philadelphia in 1947 and was recalled in September 1950 after spending the year with the Triple-A Toronto Maple Leafs of the International League. The "Whiz Kid" Phillies used him in three games in relief — all losses — as the Phils struggled (ultimately successfully) to maintain their lead in the National League pennant race. Stuffel, however, pitched well, allowing only four hits, one base on balls and one earned run in five full innings pitched. As a late-season callup, he was not eligible to play in the 1950 World Series.

He spent all of 1951 and most of 1952 in the minors, although he was called up again by the Phillies in September 1952. Stuffel then made his only Major League starting assignment on September 27 against the New York Giants at the Polo Grounds. He allowed four hits (all singles) and two earned runs in five innings pitched, but walked seven batters. Still, he was credited with his only MLB win, a 7–3 triumph.

He had a final trial with the Phils in early 1953, but was wild and ineffective in two appearances, facing four batters and walking all four — allowing four earned runs and posting an earned run average of infinity. They were his final games in the Majors, where in his seven games and 11 innings pitched he permitted nine hits, 12 bases on balls and seven earned runs. He struck out six. Stuffel continued his career in the minors into 1957; he won 105 minor-league games.

Stuffel went to Lincoln High School, in Canton, Ohio. He served in the United States Army during World War II. Stuffel was involved in the insurance business and lived in Alliance, Ohio. Stuffel died on September 9, 2018.
