= Sammy Meeks =

American baseball player (1923–2007)

- Infielder
- Born: April 23, 1923; Anderson, South Carolina, U.S.
- Died: April 23, 2007 (aged 84); Memphis, Tennessee, U.S.
- Batted: Right Threw: Right

MLB debut
- April 29, 1948, for the Washington Senators

Last MLB appearance
- September 20, 1951, for the Cincinnati Reds

MLB statistics
- Batting average: .251
- Home runs: 3
- Runs batted in: 18
- Stats at Baseball Reference

Teams
- Washington Senators (1948); Cincinnati Reds (1949–1951)

Samuel Mack Meeks (April 23, 1923 – April 23, 2007) was an American professional baseball player, an infielder whose career extended from 1946 to 1959 and who appeared in 102 Major League games in two full seasons and parts of two others between 1948 and 1951. The native of Anderson, South Carolina, batted and threw right-handed; he stood 5 feet 9 inches (1.75 m) tall and weighed 160 pounds (73 kg).

Mostly a shortstop during his Major League career, Meeks debuted with the 1948 Washington Senators, but played the bulk of his MLB games with the Cincinnati Reds, including the full seasons of 1950–1951. He also had his most memorable day as a big leaguer as a Red, after his recall late in the 1949 season. On September 22 at Crosley Field he started a doubleheader at second base against the New York Giants. Meeks collected four hits in seven at bats, including a double and two home runs, with three runs batted in. Two days later, he started another game at home, this time against the Pittsburgh Pirates, and collected two more hits and two more RBI. The three-day skein raised Meeks' batting average from .238 to .344, and he eventually batted .306 during his September trial.

Meeks made the 1950 Reds and appeared in a career-high 39 games, with 95 at-bats. He posted another strong year at the plate, hitting .284 with five multi-hit games. But his playing time decreased significantly in 1951, when he registered only 35 at-bats (mostly as a pinch hitter) and hit only .229. He then spent the rest of his career in the minors, mostly in the Double-A Southern Association.

Meeks' 50 MLB hits included eight doubles and three home runs. He died on his 84th birthday in Memphis, Tennessee.
