= Johnny Blatnik =

American baseball player (1921–2004)

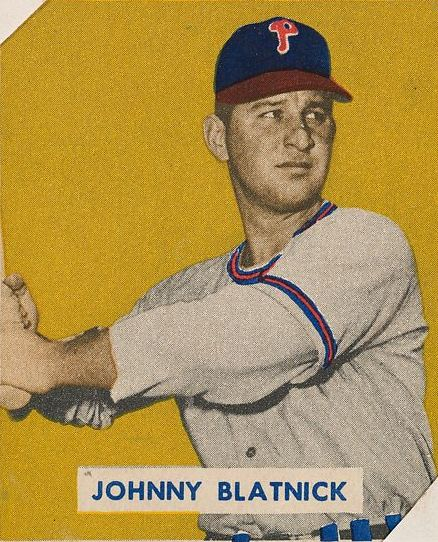
- Left fielder
- Born: March 10, 1921; Bridgeport, Ohio, U.S.
- Died: January 21, 2004 (aged 82); Lansing, Ohio, U.S.
- Batted: Right Threw: Right

MLB debut
- April 21, 1948, for the Philadelphia Phillies

Last MLB appearance
- May 14, 1950, for the St. Louis Cardinals

MLB statistics
- Batting average: .243
- Home runs: 6
- Runs batted in: 46
- Stats at Baseball Reference

Teams
- Philadelphia Phillies (1948–1950); St. Louis Cardinals (1950)

John Louis Blatnik (March 10, 1921 – January 21, 2004) was an American professional baseball outfielder who played in Major League Baseball (MLB) from 1948 through 1950 for the Philadelphia Phillies and St. Louis Cardinals. Listed at 6 ft (1.8 m), 195 lb (88 kg), Blatnik batted and threw right-handed.

A native of Bridgeport, Ohio, Blatnik was known as a line-drive hitter and a strong-armed outfielder. He was the regular left fielder for the 1948 Phillies. Blatnik appeared in a career-high 121 games while batting .260 with 41 extra-base hits that season, while leading all National League (NL) outfielders with nine assists. However, injuries cut short his career, and he appeared in just 28 games over the next two years. Blatnik began the 1950 campaign with the eventual NL champion Phillies "Whiz Kids," but was traded to the Cardinals for left-handed pitcher Ken Johnson on April 27 after only four games played with Philadelphia. Blatnik was sent to the minor leagues by the Cardinals after only seven more games and 23 plate appearances.

In a three-season Major League career, Blatnik was a .253 hitter, with 113 hits, six home runs and 46 runs batted in (RBI) in 138 games, including 59 runs, 27 double, eight triples, three stolen bases, and a .317 on-base percentage.

On January 21, 2004, Blatnik died in Lansing, Ohio, at the age of 82 and was buried nearby in Holly Memorial Gardens.
