= Bob Miller (pitcher, born 1926) =

American baseball player (1926–2020)

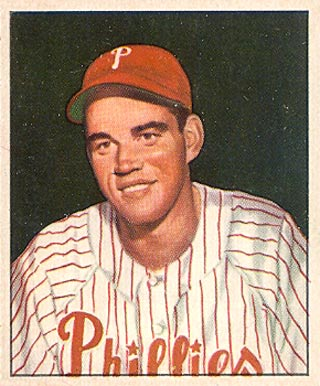
- Pitcher
- Born: June 16, 1926; Detroit, Michigan, U.S.
- Died: November 27, 2020 (aged 94); West Bloomfield Township, Michigan, U.S.
- Batted: Right Threw: Right

MLB debut
- September 16, 1949, for the Philadelphia Phillies

Last MLB appearance
- August 10, 1958, for the Philadelphia Phillies

MLB statistics
- Win–loss record: 42–42
- Earned run average: 3.96
- Strikeouts: 263
- Stats at Baseball Reference

Teams
- Philadelphia Phillies (1949–1958)

Robert John Miller (June 16, 1926 – November 27, 2020) was an American professional baseball right-handed pitcher, who appeared in Major League Baseball (MLB) from 1949 to 1958, for the Philadelphia Phillies. Miller was a member of the 1950 "Whiz Kids", only the second Phillies team to win a National League (NL) pennant.

== Early life ==
Miller attended St. Mary of Redford High School then served in the United States Army during World War II in the Pacific Theater of Operations, then attended the University of Detroit Mercy.

== Professional career ==
Miller signed with the Philadelphia Phillies in 1948 and, after winning 19 games for the Class B Terre Haute Phillies, was recalled to the big league team, in September 1949. That season, his major league statistics included 2 2/3 scoreless innings pitched, all in relief.

The following campaign, at not quite 24 years of age, Miller became a member of the youthful ("Whiz Kids") Phillies' pitching staff. He appeared in 35 games, 22 as a starter, and won 11 of 17 decisions with an earned run average (ERA) of 3.57, in 174 innings pitched. Although not as celebrated as fellow young pitchers Robin Roberts and Curt Simmons, Miller ranked third on the staff in innings pitched and fourth in victories. He hurled seven complete games and notched two shutouts.

Miller started Game 4 of the 1950 World Series, but faced only four batters and recorded only one out, and took the loss in a 5–2 New York Yankees victory that cemented a four-game sweep for the Bombers.

Miller spent parts of 1951 and 1952 in minor league baseball. Altogether, he worked in 261 MLB games, going 42–42, and surrendered 889 hits and 247 bases on balls in 822 innings pitched. Miller struck out 263. Defensively, in 205 total chances, he committed only two errors for a career .990 fielding percentage. Miller‘s only two miscues came in consecutive appearances in 1954, on August 15 in a starting role against the Pittsburgh Pirates and on August 19 in a relief appearance against the New York Giants.

== Coaching and later life ==
Following a stint as the university's assistant baseball coach, Miller assumed head coaching duties for the Titans baseball team in 1965, becoming the program's fourth head coach. He would hold this position until 2000, compiling 896 wins over that time period. Miller’s 36-year tenure would lead to a 1979 induction into the Titans Sports Hall of Fame and the Michigan Sports Hall of Fame in 1999.

Miller’s baseball coaching legacy extended to his sons Pat and Bob. Pat Miller serves as an assistant coach at Walled Lake Central High School in Walled Lake, Michigan, and Bob Miller, Jr., coaches varsity baseball at Redford Union High School in Redford, Michigan. Miller Sr. died on November 27, 2020, at the age of 94.

== See also ==
- List of Major League Baseball players who spent their entire career with one franchise
