= 1950 New York Giants (MLB) season =

1950 New York Giants
- League: National League
- Ballpark: Polo Grounds
- City: New York City
- Record: 86–68 (.558)
- League place: 3rd
- Owners: Horace Stoneham
- General managers: Chub Feeney
- Managers: Leo Durocher
- Television: WPIX (Russ Hodges, Ernie Harwell)
- Radio: WMCA (Russ Hodges, Ernie Harwell)

The 1950 New York Giants season was the franchise's 68th season. The team finished in third place in the National League with an 86–68 record, 5 games behind the Philadelphia Phillies.

== Offseason ==
- December 14, 1949: Sid Gordon, Buddy Kerr, Willard Marshall, and Red Webb were traded by the Giants to the Boston Braves for Eddie Stanky and Alvin Dark.
- Prior to 1950 season: Al Sima was purchased from the Giants by the Washington Senators.

== Regular season ==
=== Season standings ===
National League
Team	W	L	Pct.	GB	Home	Road
Philadelphia Phillies	91	63	.591	—	48‍–‍29	43‍–‍34
Brooklyn Dodgers	89	65	.578	2	48‍–‍30	41‍–‍35
New York Giants	86	68	.558	5	44‍–‍32	42‍–‍36
Boston Braves	83	71	.539	8	46‍–‍31	37‍–‍40
St. Louis Cardinals	78	75	.510	12½	48‍–‍28	30‍–‍47
Cincinnati Reds	66	87	.431	24½	38‍–‍38	28‍–‍49
Chicago Cubs	64	89	.418	26½	35‍–‍42	29‍–‍47
Pittsburgh Pirates	57	96	.373	33½	33‍–‍44	24‍–‍52

=== Record vs. opponents ===
1950 National League record Sources:
Team	BSN	BRO	CHC	CIN	NYG	PHI	PIT	STL
Boston	—	9–13	9–13	17–5	13–9	9–13–1	15–7–1	11–11
Brooklyn	13–9	—	10–12	12–10	12–10	11–11–1	19–3	12–10
Chicago	13–9	12–10	—	4–17	5–17	9–13–1	11–11	10–12
Cincinnati	5–17	10–12	17–4	—	11–11	4–18	12–10	7–15
New York	9–13	10–12	17–5	11–11	—	12–10	16–6	11–11
Philadelphia	13–9–1	11–11–1	13–9–1	18–4	10–12	—	14–8	12–10
Pittsburgh	7–15–1	3–19	11–11	10–12	6–16	8–14	—	12–9
St. Louis	11–11	10–12	12–10	15–7	11–11	10–12	9–12	—

=== Notable transactions ===
- June 20, 1950: Willie Mays was signed as an amateur free agent by the Giants.

=== Roster ===
1950 New York Giants
Roster
Pitchers: 44 Andy Hansen; 36 Clint Hartung; 21 Jim Hearn; 30 Kirby Higbe; 46 Larry Jansen; 37 Sheldon Jones; 32 Monte Kennedy; 31 Dave Koslo; 33 Jack Kramer; 35 Sal Maglie; 30 George Spencer	Catchers: 6 Sam Calderone; 7 Ray Mueller; 9 Wes Westrum; 7 Sal Yvars; Infielders: 19 Alvin Dark; 15,20 Tookie Gilbert; 15 Jack Harshman; 20 Monte Irvin; 10 Spider Jorgensen; 17 Jack Lohrke; 20 Nap Reyes; 18 Bill Rigney; 14 Rudy Rufer; 12 Eddie Stanky; 16 Hank Thompson	Outfielders: 25 Whitey Lockman; 24 Jack Maguire; 22 Don Mueller; 23 Bobby Thomson; 39 Roy Weatherly; Other batters: 10 Marv Blaylock; 21 Mike McCormick; 26 Pete Milne	Manager: 2 Leo Durocher; Coaches: 5 Fred Fitzsimmons; 3 Herman Franks; 1 Frank Shellenback

== Player stats ==
= Indicates team leader

=== Batting ===
==== Starters by position ====
Note: Pos = Position; G = Games played; AB = At bats; H = Hits; Avg. = Batting average; HR = Home runs; RBI = Runs batted in

Pos	Player	G	AB	H	Avg.	HR	RBI
C	Wes Westrum	140	437	103	.236	23	71
1B	Tookie Gilbert	113	322	71	.220	4	32
2B	Eddie Stanky	152	527	158	.300	8	51
SS	Alvin Dark	154	587	164	.279	16	67
3B	Hank Thompson	148	512	148	.289	20	91
OF	Whitey Lockman	129	532	157	.295	6	52
OF	Don Mueller	132	525	153	.291	7	84
OF	Bobby Thomson	149	563	142	.252	25	85

==== Other batters ====
Note: G = Games played; AB = At bats; H = Hits; Avg. = Batting average; HR = Home runs; RBI = Runs batted in

Player	G	AB	H	Avg.	HR	RBI
Monte Irvin	110	374	112	.299	15	66
Bill Rigney	56	83	15	.181	0	8
Roy Weatherly	52	69	18	.261	0	11
Sam Calderone	34	67	20	.299	1	12
Jack Lohrke	30	43	8	.186	0	4
Jack Maguire	29	40	7	.175	0	3
Spider Jorgensen	24	37	5	.135	0	4
Jack Harshman	9	32	4	.125	2	4
Sal Yvars	9	14	2	.143	0	0
Ray Mueller	4	11	1	.091	0	0
Mike McCormick	4	4	0	.000	0	0
Pete Milne	4	4	1	.250	0	1
Nap Reyes	1	1	0	.000	0	0
Marv Blaylock	1	1	0	.000	0	0

=== Pitching ===
= Indicates league leader

==== Starting pitchers ====
Note: G = Games pitched; IP = Innings pitched; W = Wins; L = Losses; ERA = Earned run average; SO = Strikeouts

Player	G	IP	W	L	ERA	SO
Larry Jansen	40	275.0	19	13	3.01	161
Sheldon Jones	40	199.0	13	16	4.61	97
Jim Hearn	16	125.0	11	3	1.94	54

==== Other pitchers ====
Note: G = Games pitched; IP = Innings pitched; W = Wins; L = Losses; ERA = Earned run average; SO = Strikeouts

Player	G	IP	W	L	ERA	SO
Sal Maglie	47	206.0	18	4	2.71	96
Dave Koslo	40	186.2	13	15	3.91	56
Monty Kennedy	36	114.1	5	4	4.72	41
Jack Kramer	35	86.2	3	6	3.53	27
Clint Hartung	20	65.1	3	3	6.61	23

==== Relief pitchers ====
Note: G = Games pitched; W = Wins; L = Losses; SV = Saves; ERA = Earned run average; SO = Strikeouts

Player	G	W	L	SV	ERA	SO
Andy Hansen	31	0	1	3	5.53	19
Kirby Higbe	18	0	3	0	4.93	17
George Spencer	10	1	0	0	2.49	5

== Farm system ==
Level	Team	League	Manager
AAA	Minneapolis Millers	American Association	Tommy Heath
AAA	Jersey City Giants	International League	Joe Becker
A	Jacksonville Tars	Sally League	Hal Gruber and Dale Alexander
A	Sioux City Soos	Western League	Hugh Poland
B	Trenton Giants	Interstate League	Frank Genovese
B	Richmond Colts	Piedmont League	Vinnie Smith
B	Vicksburg Billies	Southeastern League	Buddy Blair
B	Knoxville Smokies	Tri-State League	Jack Aragón
C	Erie Sailors	Middle Atlantic League	Pete Pavich
C	St. Cloud Rox	Northern League	Charlie Fox
C	Idaho Falls Russets	Pioneer League	Lilio Marcucci
C	Enid Giants	Western Association	Harold Kollar
D	Bristol Twins	Appalachian League	Ben Geraghty
D	Galax Leafs	Blue Ridge League	Jim Grigg
D	Medford Rogues	Far West League	Tommy Nelson and Wilfred Jonas

Level	Team	League	Manager
D	Sanford Giants	Florida State League	Ed Levy
D	Springfield Giants	Ohio–Indiana League	Andy Gilbert
D	Lawton Giants	Sooner State League	Louis Brower
D	Lenoir Red Sox	Western Carolina League	Claude Jonnard
D	Oshkosh Giants	Wisconsin State League	Dave Garcia

LEAGUE CHAMPIONS: Sioux City, Bristol, Lenoir, Oshkosh
