= Dick Whitman =

American baseball player (1920–2003)

- Outfielder
- Born: November 9, 1920; Woodburn, Oregon
- Died: February 12, 2003 (aged 82); Peoria, Arizona
- Batted: Left Threw: Right

MLB debut
- April 16, 1946, for the Brooklyn Dodgers

Last MLB appearance
- June 4, 1951, for the Philadelphia Phillies

MLB statistics
- Batting average: .259
- Home runs: 2
- Runs scored: 93
- Stats at Baseball Reference

Teams
- Brooklyn Dodgers (1946–1949); Philadelphia Phillies (1950–1951)

Dick Corwin Whitman (November 9, 1920 – February 12, 2003) was an American professional baseball player. The outfielder, a native of Woodburn, Oregon, appeared in 285 games in Major League Baseball over all or parts of six seasons (1946–1951) for the Brooklyn Dodgers and Philadelphia Phillies. He batted left-handed, threw right-handed, and was listed as 5 feet 11 inches (1.80 m) tall and 170 pounds (77 kg).

== Early career and military service ==
Whitman played college baseball at the University of Oregon and signed with Brooklyn prior to the 1942 baseball season. He played for two lower-level Dodger farm teams that year and hit a composite .313. Then he entered the United States Army for World War II service. Sent to the European Theater in December 1944, he was a veteran of the Battle of the Bulge, earning a Purple Heart, Bronze Star and three battle stars.

== Major league career ==
He returned to baseball in 1946, and in only his second pro season, he won a place on the Dodgers' MLB roster. As a rookie, Whitman was the pennant-contending Dodgers' starting left-fielder and #3 hitter on Opening Day, April 16 against the Boston Braves. Although he was held hitless in his first two National League games, he was Brooklyn's regular left-fielder for the season's first 13 games. On May 1, he started in center field and went five-for-five against the Chicago Cubs; the Dodgers won 5–1 to improve their record to 9–4 while Whitman's batting average rose to .263. But Whitman soon assumed the role of backup center-fielder to fellow rookie Carl Furillo, although he started another 40 games in center. In 104 games played, he collected 69 hits, 15 doubles, three triples, two home runs and 31 runs batted in—all of which were his MLB career bests.

Whitman then spent 1947 with the Triple-A Montreal Royals, hitting .327 in 141 games. The Dodgers recalled him in September and used him in four contests, but he was ineligible for the 1947 World Series. The 1948 campaign saw Whitman get into 60 games for the Dodgers, with 38 starts in the Brooklyn outfield. He batted a career-high .291, but he also was sent back to Montreal for 40 games. Then, in 1949, Whitman spent the full year with Brooklyn, but with drastically reduced playing time, his production slumped to a .184 batting average on only nine hits over 23 games. Nevertheless, he appeared in the 1949 World Series as a pinch hitter, striking out against Allie Reynolds of the New York Yankees in Game 4 on October 8 to close out a 6–4 Dodger defeat. The Dodgers then sold Whitman's contract to the Phillies in November.

The 1950 Phillies—immortalized as the "Whiz Kids" because of young stars like Robin Roberts, Richie Ashburn, Curt Simmons, "Puddin' Head" Jones, Del Ennis and Granny Hamner—won the second National League pennant in the club's history, outlasting Whitman's former team, the Dodgers, in the season's final game. One of the team's veterans, Whitman was the Phils' most-used backup outfielder, starting 21 games and appearing in 75 contests overall. He batted .308 as a pinch-hitter, with 12 hits, and hit .250 overall. Then he made three appearances in the 1950 World Series as an emergency batsman, going 0-for-two with a base on balls.

That season would be Whitman's last full year in the majors. In 1951, he collected only two hits in 17 at bats as a pinch hitter and reserve outfielder for the Phillies, and was traded back to the Dodgers on June 8. Brooklyn sent him to Triple-A, and Whitman spent the next 41/2 years playing at the highest levels of the minors. Then, in 1956 and 1957, he was the player-manager of the San Jose JoSox of the Class C California League. In 1956, Whitman led the JoSox into the California League playoffs as both skipper and the circuit's batting champion and Most Valuable Player.

His final big league totals included 165 career hits in 285 total games, with 37 doubles, three triples, two homers and 67 runs batted in. He hit .259 lifetime. He was excellent defensively, recording a .992 fielding percentage at all three outfield positions. He committed only three errors in 367 total chances in 1258.1 innings.

Dick Whitman spent his post-baseball years in San Jose as a supervisor for the San Jose Water Works. He was, all his life, an avid hunter and fisherman and an exemplary sportsman. He and Jo Ann -- they had three children, Richard, Jr., Joe and Allison -- retired to Peoria, Arizona, where he died at age 82.
