= Ken Silvestri =

American baseball player and manager (1916–1992)

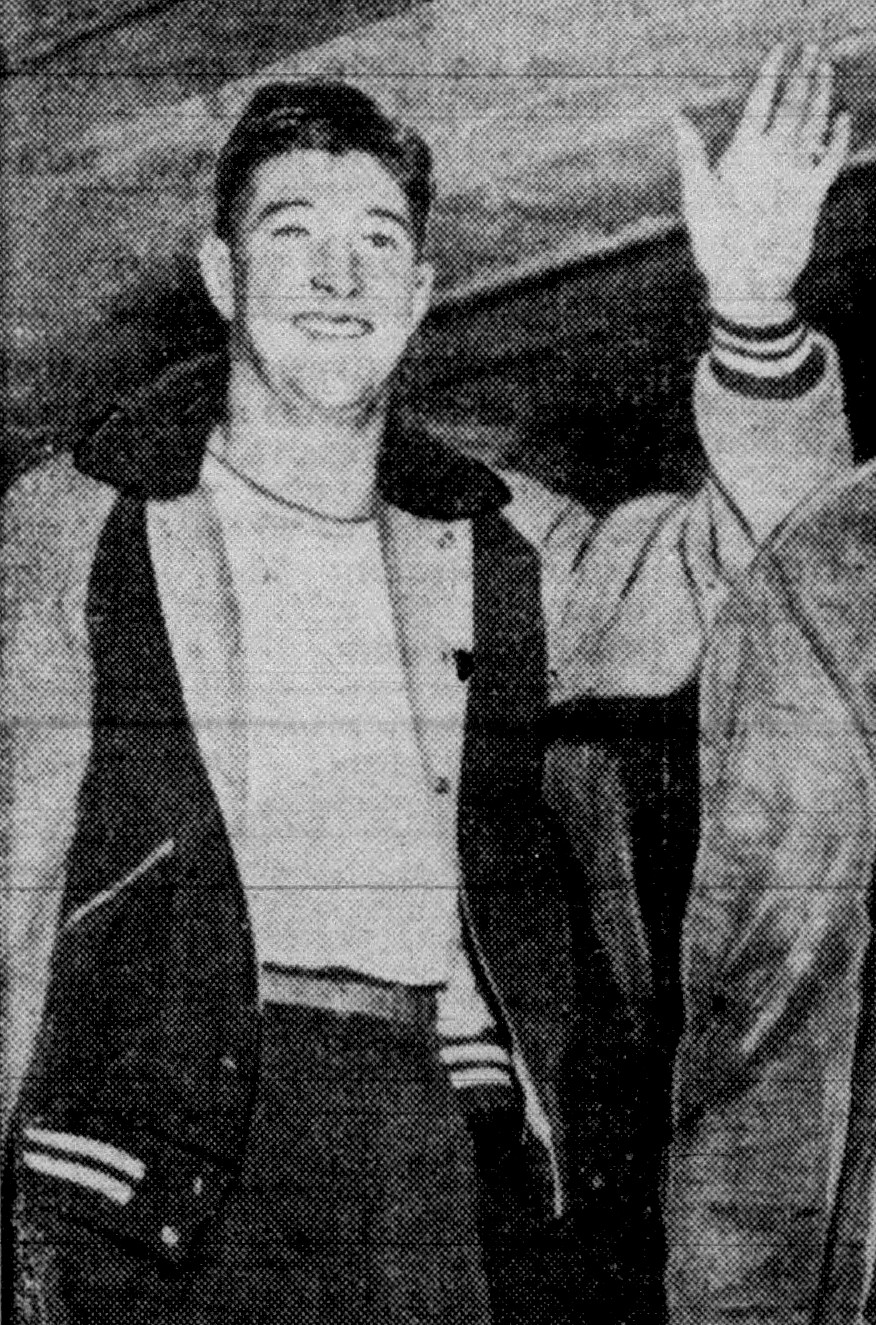
- Silvestri, circa 1941
- Catcher
- Born: May 3, 1916; Chicago, Illinois, U.S.
- Died: March 31, 1992 (aged 75); Tallahassee, Florida, U.S.
- Batted: Switch Threw: Right

MLB debut
- April 18, 1939, for the Chicago White Sox

Last MLB appearance
- July 31, 1951, for the Philadelphia Phillies

MLB statistics
- Batting average: .217
- Home runs: 5
- Runs batted in: 25
- Stats at Baseball Reference

Teams
- Chicago White Sox (1939–1940); New York Yankees (1941, 1946–1947); Philadelphia Phillies (1949–1951)

Career highlights and awards
- World Series champion (1941)

Kenneth Joseph Silvestri (May 3, 1916 – March 31, 1992) was an American professional baseball player, coach and manager. During his 16-year professional playing career, he was a backup catcher in the Major Leagues over eight seasons scattered between 1939 through 1951, appearing for the Chicago White Sox (1939–40), New York Yankees (1941; 1946–47) and Philadelphia Phillies (1950–51).

Silvestri was born in Chicago and attended Purdue University. A switch-hitter who threw right-handed, he stood 6 feet 1 inch (1.85 m) tall and weighed 200 pounds (91 kg). He served in the United States Army during World War II.

As a big leaguer, Silvestri batted .217, with 44 hits, 11 doubles, one triple, five home runs and 25 RBI in 102 games played. As a member of the 1950 Phillies, he appeared in Game 2 of the 1950 World Series as a defensive replacement, spelling starting catcher Andy Seminick and handling Baseball Hall of Famer Robin Roberts for two scoreless innings. However, the opposing Yankees broke through to win the game after Silvestri was removed for a pinch hitter in the ninth.

Following his MLB playing career, Silvestri managed in the minor leagues in the Yankee farm system and coached for the Phillies (1952–53; 1959–60), Milwaukee / Atlanta Braves (1963–75) and the White Sox (1976; 1982), working as a minor league instructor for Chicago from 1977 to 1981. He also managed the Atlanta Braves for the final three games of the 1967 season after skipper Billy Hitchcock was fired. The Braves lost all three games Silvestri managed.

Silvestri died in Tallahassee, Florida at age 75.

== Sources ==
- Career statistics from Baseball Reference · Retrosheet · Baseball Almanac

Preceded by Johnny Sain; Ron Schueler	Chicago White Sox pitching coach 1976; 1982	Succeeded by Stan Williams; Dave Duncan
