= Maje McDonnell =

American baseball coach, scout, and official

- Coach
- Born: July 20, 1920; Philadelphia, Pennsylvania, U.S.
- Died: July 8, 2010 (aged 89); Philadelphia, Pennsylvania, U.S.
- Batted: Right Threw: Right

Teams
- As coach: Philadelphia Phillies (1948–1957)

Robert A. "Maje" McDonnell (July 20, 1920 – July 8, 2010) was an American coach, scout and official with the Philadelphia Phillies of Major League Baseball. Until he retired in 2009, McDonnell served for four decades as the Phillies' "goodwill ambassador," and was an employee of the team for five of the eight National League pennants it has won, and both of its World Series championships. McDonnell was considered a face of the Phillies franchise.

Born in Philadelphia, Pennsylvania, he attended the city's Northeast High School. McDonnell was a right-handed pitcher in college baseball who stood 5 feet 6 inches (168 cm) tall and weighed 135 pounds (61 kg; 9 st 9 lb). He attended Villanova University, where he also played basketball despite his stature. He joined the United States Army during World War II and rose to the rank of major, saw combat in the European Theater of Operations, and was awarded a Bronze Star, a Purple Heart and five battle stars.

McDonnell joined the Phillies as a batting practice pitcher in 1947, and was serving as a coach when the 1950 "Whiz Kids" won the National League flag — at that time, only the second pennant in Phillies' history. He was a member of the Phils' coaching staff through 1957, working under managers Ben Chapman, Eddie Sawyer, Steve O'Neill, Terry Moore and Mayo Smith. He was a Phillies' scout from 1958 to 1960.

After working for the Ballantine Brewery and coaching at the high school and college level in the Philadelphia area, he returned to the Phillies in 1973, serving as a "ticket seller, tour guide, Phantasy Camp instructor, and the organization's face and voice in the community." He was thus part of Phillie teams that won NL pennants in 1980, 1983, 1993 and 2008, and its 1980 and 2008 world champions.
