= Dale Coogan =

American baseball player (1930–1989)

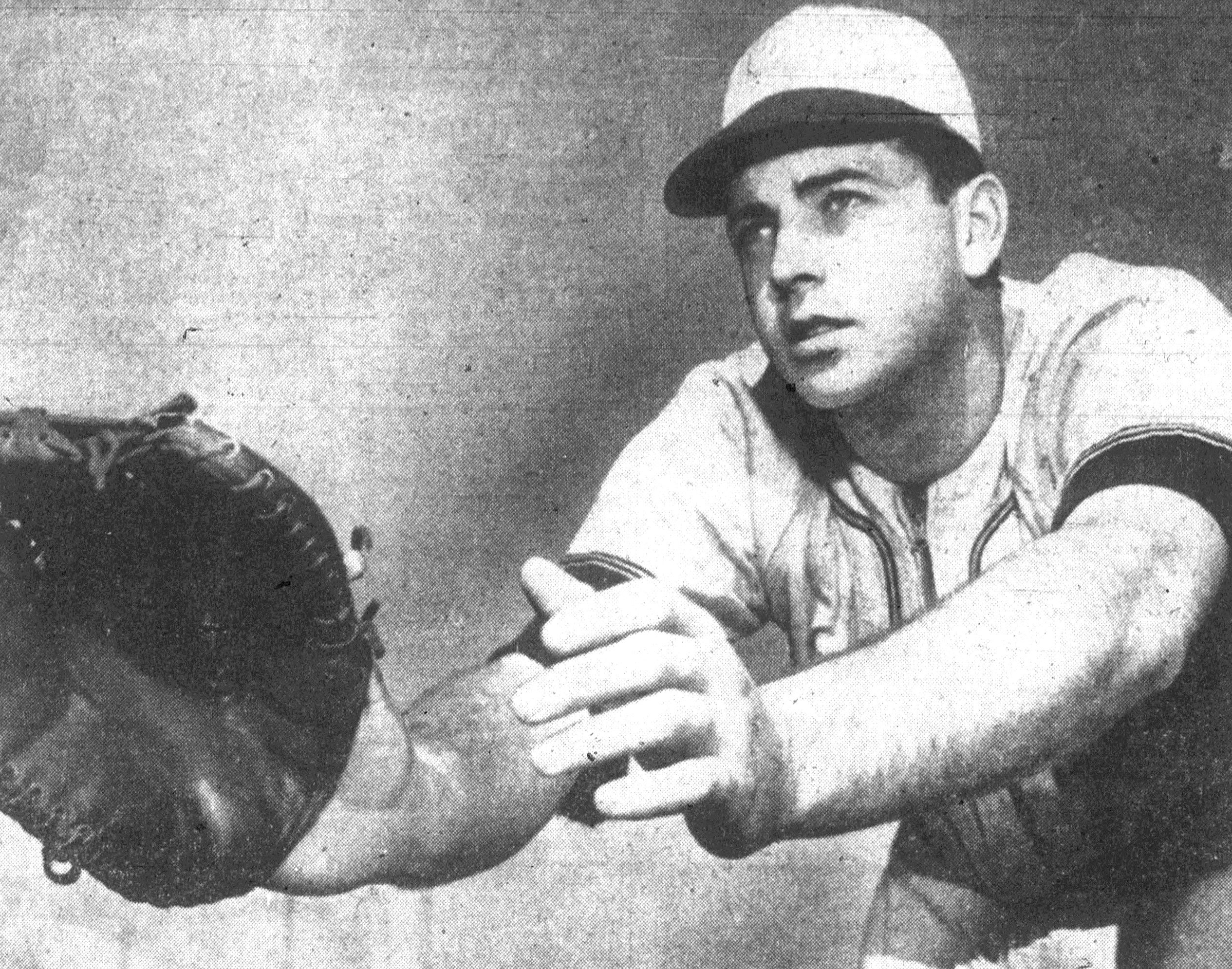
- Coogan, circa 1951
- First baseman
- Born: August 14, 1930; Los Angeles, California
- Died: March 8, 1989 (aged 58); Mission Viejo, California
- Batted: Left Threw: Left

MLB debut
- April 22, 1950, for the Pittsburgh Pirates

Last MLB appearance
- July 5, 1950, for the Pittsburgh Pirates

MLB statistics
- Batting average: .240
- Home runs: 1
- Runs batted in: 13
- Stats at Baseball Reference

Teams
- Pittsburgh Pirates (1950)

Dale Roger Coogan (August 14, 1930 – March 8, 1989) was an American professional baseball player who appeared in 53 games in the Major Leagues as a first baseman for the Pittsburgh Pirates in 1950. A native of Los Angeles, California, Coogan threw and batted left-handed and was listed as 6 feet 1 inch (1.85 m) tall and 195 pounds (88 kg).

He signed with the Pirates in 1948 after attending Washington High School and made the big-league Pirates after two seasons in their farm system. He notched his first hit on April 29, 1950, by singling off Eddie Erautt of the Cincinnati Reds at Crosley Field. Other highlights included a four-hit game on May 30 against the St. Louis Cardinals and his only big-league home run, a three-run blast off Ralph Branca in a game suspended by rain that began June 24 and finished August 1. Coogan's belt happened during the June contest, but by August 1, he was back in the minor leagues. The Brooklyn Dodgers eventually won the game, 21–12.

During his three-month tenure in the National League in 1950, Coogan registered 31 hits, with six doubles and one triple accompanying his one home run. He continued his playing career in the minors through 1958, including brief service with his hometown Hollywood Stars of the Pacific Coast League in 1951.

Coogan attended college during the off-seasons of his baseball career, and earned bachelor's and master's degrees from Long Beach State University, and a doctorate from the University of Southern California. He was a teacher or administrator with three Southern California public school districts, and was superintendent of the Ocean View Elementary School District at the time of his death, at 58, from cancer in Mission Viejo, California. He was interred at Pacific View Memorial Park.
