= Monk Dubiel =

American baseball player (1918–1969)

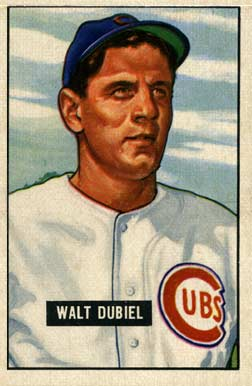
- Pitcher
- Born: February 12, 1918; Hartford, Connecticut, U.S.
- Died: October 23, 1969 (aged 51); Hartford, Connecticut, U.S.
- Batted: Right Threw: Right

MLB debut
- April 19, 1944, for the New York Yankees

Last MLB appearance
- April 29, 1952, for the Chicago Cubs

MLB statistics
- Win–loss record: 45–53
- Earned run average: 3.87
- Strikeouts: 289
- Stats at Baseball Reference

Teams
- New York Yankees (1944–1945); Philadelphia Phillies (1948); Chicago Cubs (1949–1952)

Walter John "Monk" Dubiel (February 12, 1918 – October 23, 1969) was an American professional baseball right-handed pitcher, who played in Major League Baseball (MLB) for the New York Yankees, Philadelphia Phillies, and Chicago Cubs. He stood 6 feet (1.83 m) tall and weighed 190 pounds (86 kg).

A native and lifelong resident of Hartford, Connecticut, Dubiel pitched 14 years (1941–1954) in pro baseball, spending five full seasons and parts of two others in MLB between 1944 and 1952. His best season was his rookie 1944 campaign for the New York Yankees. While Dubiel evenly split 26 decisions, he logged 19 complete games, three shutouts, and 232 innings pitched, with an earned run average (ERA) of 3.38. After winning ten games, losing nine, for the 1945 Yankees, he was sent to Minor League Baseball (MiLB) for the first two seasons immediately following World War II

Dubiel resurfaced in the National League (NL) in 1948 as a "swing man" — working as both a starter and a reliever — for the Philadelphia Phillies. On December 14, 1948, Dubiel was traded to the Chicago Cubs in a four-player swap that sent first baseman Eddie Waitkus to the Phils. Although Waitkus would miss much of the 1949 season after being shot by Ruth Ann Steinhagen (an obsessed fan), he would play a key role on the 1950 "Whiz Kids".

Dubiel pitched in 187 big league games, 97 as a starting pitcher, and allowed 854 hits, and 349 bases on balls, in 879 1/3 innings pitched. He posted a 45–53 won–lost record and a 3.87 career earned run average, struck out 289, and recorded 11 career saves during his MLB career.

Dubiel died in Hartford, aged 51, on October 23, 1969.
