= Ken Johnson (left-handed pitcher) =

American baseball player (1923–2004)

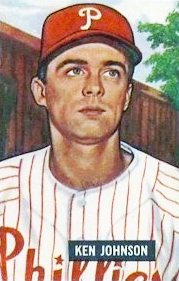
- Johnson's 1951 Bowman Gum baseball card
- Pitcher
- Born: January 14, 1923; Topeka, Kansas, U.S.
- Died: April 6, 2004 (aged 81); Wichita, Kansas, U.S.
- Batted: Left Threw: Left

MLB debut
- September 18, 1947, for the St. Louis Cardinals

Last MLB appearance
- July 15, 1952, for the Detroit Tigers

MLB statistics
- Win–loss record: 12–14
- Earned run average: 4.58
- Innings pitched: 269 1/3
- Stats at Baseball Reference

Teams
- St. Louis Cardinals (1947–1950); Philadelphia Phillies (1950–1951); Detroit Tigers (1952)

Career highlights and awards
- Appeared in 1950 World Series

Kenneth Wandersee Johnson (January 14, 1923 – April 6, 2004), nicknamed "Hook" for his curveball, was an American professional baseball player, a pitcher who appeared in 74 games pitched in Major League Baseball for three different teams between the 1947 and 1952 seasons. Listed at 6 feet 1 inch (1.85 m), 185 pounds (84 kg), he batted and threw left-handed.

The native of Topeka, Kansas, served in World War II in the United States Army in the Pacific Theater of Operations, where he was a tank commander.

Johnson entered the Majors in 1947 with the St. Louis Cardinals, playing for them in part of four seasons (1947–50) before joining the Philadelphia Phillies (1950–51) and Detroit Tigers (1952). In his first major league start, he pitched a one-hitter for the Cardinals against the Chicago Cubs at Wrigley Field (September 27). He struggled with his control after that and was sent by St. Louis to the Phillies in exchange for outfielder Johnny Blatnik. He went 4–1 as a member of the famous Phillies Whiz Kids, on the way to the National League pennant. Although he did not pitch in the 1950 World Series, Johnson appeared as a pinch runner for Dick Sisler in the ninth inning of Game 4, and scored the Phils' last run of the Fall Classic on an error by New York Yankees leftfielder Gene Woodling. New York won that game, 5–2, and the Series, four games to none. Johnson also pitched in nine games for Detroit in 1952, his last Major League season.

In a six-season career, Johnson posted a 12–14 record with a 4.58 ERA in 74 appearances, including 34 starts, eight complete games, four shutouts, 147 strikeouts, 195 bases on balls, and a 1.32 walk-to-strikeout ratio in 269 1/3 innings of work. Johnson died in Wichita, Kansas, at the age of 81.
