= Bill Pierro =

American baseball player (1926–2006)

- Pitcher
- Born: April 15, 1926; Brooklyn, New York
- Died: April 1, 2006 (aged 79); Brooklyn, New York
- Batted: Right Threw: Right

MLB debut
- July 17, 1950, for the Pittsburgh Pirates

Last MLB appearance
- September 19, 1950, for the Pittsburgh Pirates

MLB statistics
- Win–loss record: 0-2
- Earned run average: 10.55
- Strikeouts: 13
- Stats at Baseball Reference

Teams
- Pittsburgh Pirates (1950)

William Leonard Pierro (April 15, 1926 – April 1, 2006), nicknamed "Wild Bill", was a pitcher in Major League Baseball. He played for the Pittsburgh Pirates.
