= Bill Macdonald (baseball) =

American baseball player (1929–1991)

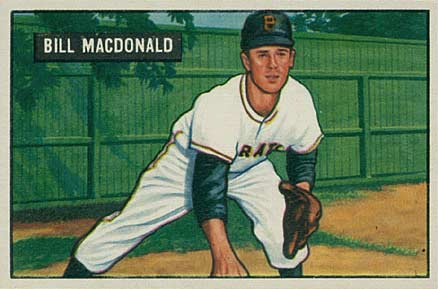
- Pitcher
- Born: March 28, 1929; Alameda, California, U.S.
- Died: May 4, 1991 (aged 62); Shasta Lake, California, U.S.
- Batted: Right Threw: Right

MLB debut
- May 6, 1950, for the Pittsburgh Pirates

Last MLB appearance
- May 24, 1953, for the Pittsburgh Pirates

MLB statistics
- Win–loss record: 8–11
- Earned run average: 4.66
- Strikeouts: 64
- Stats at Baseball Reference

Teams
- Pittsburgh Pirates (1950, 1953)

William Paul Macdonald, Jr. (March 28, 1929 – May 4, 1991) was an American professional baseball player, a right-handed pitcher who appeared in 36 Major League games for the 1950 and 1953 Pittsburgh Pirates. Born in Alameda, California, he stood 5 feet 10 inches (1.78 m) tall and weighed 170 pounds (77 kg) as an active player.

Macdonald signed his first professional contract with the Detroit Tigers and spent 1947–48 in their farm system. After winning 15 games during the latter season for the Flint Arrows of the Class A Central League, Macdonald was declared a free agent by Commissioner of Baseball Happy Chandler on October 27, 1948; three months later, he signed with the New Orleans Pelicans, the Pirate affiliate in the Double-A Southern Association. In 1949, he posted a 13–11 record with the Pelicans and made the Pirates' roster out of spring training in 1950.

As a rookie, he appeared in 32 games, twenty as a starting pitcher, and won eight of 18 decisions, with six complete games and two shutouts. In his second MLB game, on May 23, he threw a complete game, three-hitter and blanked the eventual National League champion Philadelphia Phillies, 6–0 at Shibe Park.

Macdonald missed the entire 1951–52 seasons due to military service. When he returned to baseball in 1953, he pitched ineffectively for the Pirates during the season's early weeks and spent much of the campaign with the Hollywood Stars of the Open-Classification Pacific Coast League. He left baseball after the 1954 minor league season.

All told, in 160 1/3 Major League innings pitched, Macdonald gave up 150 hits and 96 bases on balls; he struck out 64.
