= Jay Avrea =

American baseball player (1920–1987)

- Pitcher
- Born: July 6, 1920; Cleburne, Texas, U.S.
- Died: June 26, 1987 (aged 66); Dallas, Texas, U.S.
- Batted: Right Threw: Right

MLB debut
- April 22, 1950, for the Cincinnati Reds

Last MLB appearance
- May 6, 1950, for the Cincinnati Reds

MLB statistics
- Win–loss record: 0–0
- Earned run average: 3.38
- Strikeouts: 2
- Stats at Baseball Reference

Teams
- Cincinnati Reds (1950)

James Epherium Avrea (July 6, 1920 – June 26, 1987) was an American professional baseball player. The right-handed pitcher appeared in two Major League Baseball games for the Cincinnati Reds during the 1950 season. Avrea was born in Cleburne, Texas, and attended W. H. Adamson High School in Dallas. He was listed as 6 feet 1 inch (1.85 m) tall and 175 pounds (79 kg).

Avrea's professional career lasted for six total seasons (1940; 1947–1951). His two appearances for the Reds came as a relief pitcher on April 22 and May 6, 1950, both Cincinnati defeats. In his debut game, Avrea entered the game with the Reds down 9–1 in the fourth inning; he held the Pittsburgh Pirates off the scoresheet for 22/3 innings pitched before exiting for a pinch hitter. In his second and final appearance, he again entered a lopsided game, with Cincinnati trailing the Boston Braves 11–1. He gave up two runs in 22/3 innings and left with the Reds still trailing 13–9; they dropped that game 15–11.

In his two games, Avrea notched two strikeouts and allowed six hits, three bases on balls and two runs in 51/3 innings pitched, with a 3.38 earned run average. He died in Dallas at age 66.
