= Paul Minner =

American baseball player (1923–2006)

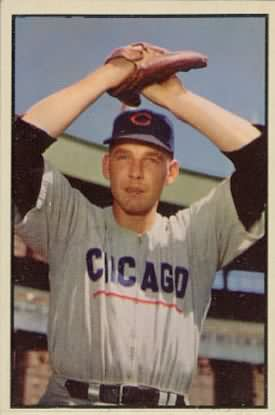
- Pitcher
- Born: July 30, 1923; New Wilmington, Pennsylvania, U.S.
- Died: March 28, 2006 (aged 82); Lemoyne, Pennsylvania, U.S.
- Batted: Left Threw: Left

MLB debut
- September 12, 1946, for the Brooklyn Dodgers

Last MLB appearance
- June 12, 1956, for the Chicago Cubs

MLB statistics
- Win–loss record: 69–84
- Earned run average: 3.94
- Strikeouts: 481
- Stats at Baseball Reference

Teams
- Brooklyn Dodgers (1946, 1948–1949); Chicago Cubs (1950–1956)

Paul Edison Minner (July 30, 1923 – March 28, 2006) was an American Major League pitcher from 1946 to 1956. He played for the Chicago Cubs and Brooklyn Dodgers.

== Biography ==
Born in New Wilmington, Pennsylvania, on July 30, 1923, Minner was listed at 6 ft 5 in (1.96 m) and 210 lb (95 kg).

Minner was signed by the Dodgers and began minor league play in 1941, but service as a master sergeant in the United States Army during World War II interrupted his baseball career from 1943 through 1945.

Minner surrendered the first home run in Frank Robinson's career on April 28, 1956. It was the first of Robinson's 586 career home runs, tenth all-time.

Minner was a better than average hitting pitcher in his major league career, posting a .219 batting average (98-for-447) with 46 runs, 6 home runs, 43 RBI and 33 bases on balls. He finished his career with a .967 fielding percentage.

== Death ==
Minner died at the age of eighty-two on March 28, 2006, in Lemoyne, Pennsylvania.
