= Frank Hiller =

American baseball player (1920–1987)

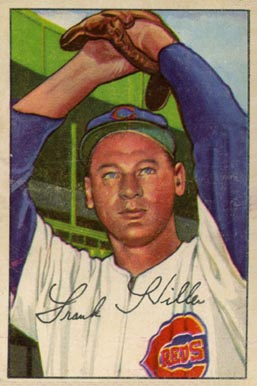
- Pitcher
- Born: July 13, 1920; Irvington, New Jersey, U.S.
- Died: January 10, 1987 (aged 66); West Chester, Pennsylvania, U.S.
- Batted: Right Threw: Right

MLB debut
- May 25, 1946, for the New York Yankees

Last MLB appearance
- June 23, 1953, for the New York Giants

MLB statistics
- Win–loss record: 30–32
- Earned run average: 4.42
- Strikeouts: 197
- Stats at Baseball Reference

Teams
- New York Yankees (1946, 1948–1949); Chicago Cubs (1950–1951); Cincinnati Reds (1952); New York Giants (1953)

Frank Walter Hiller (July 13, 1920 – January 10, 1987) was an American professional baseball pitcher who played in the Major Leagues from 1946 to 1953 for the New York Giants, Chicago Cubs, New York Yankees and Cincinnati Reds.
