= Willie Ramsdell =

American baseball player (1916–1969)

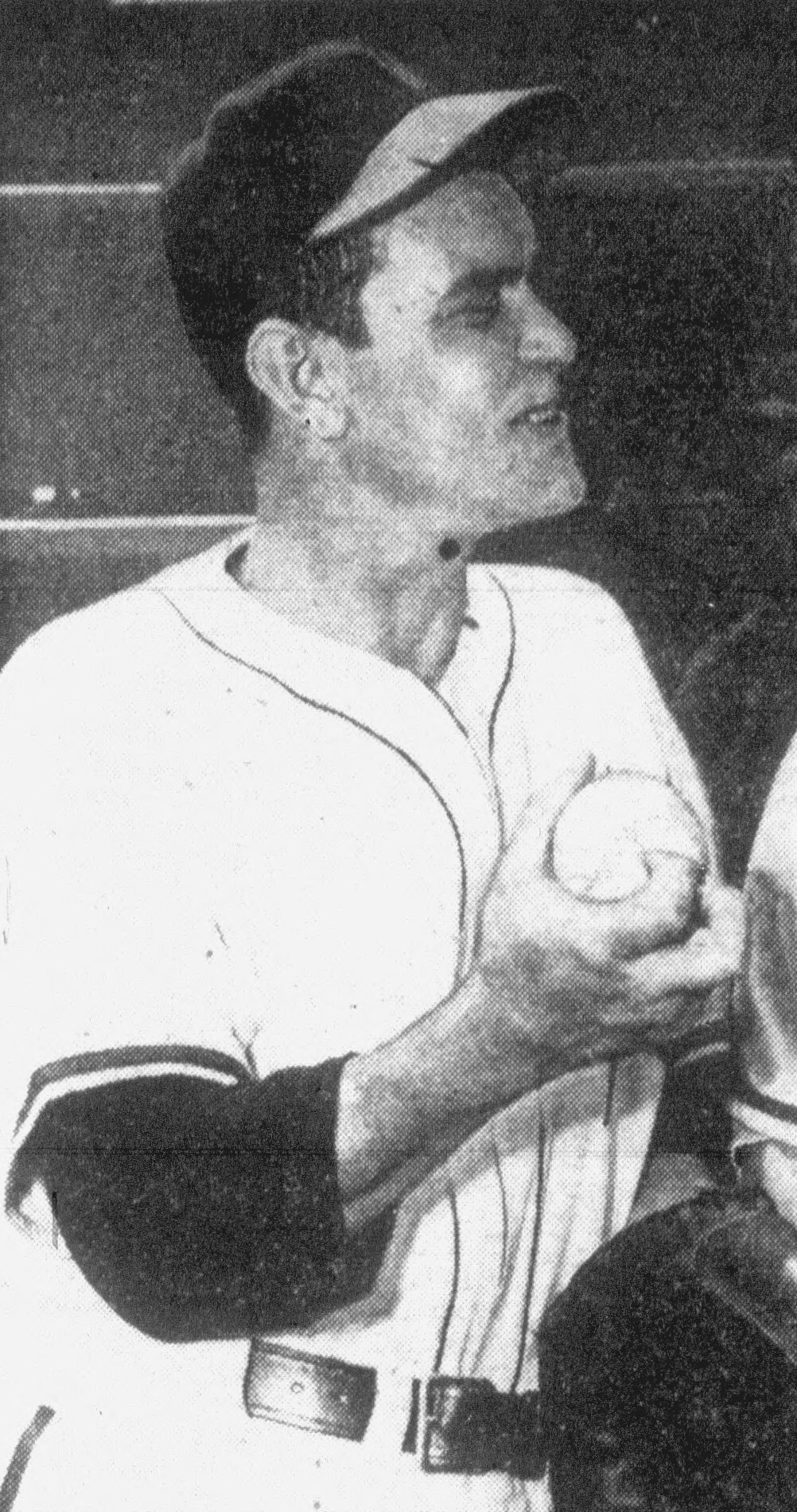
- Ramsdell, circa 1949
- Pitcher
- Born: April 4, 1916; Williamsburg, Kansas, U.S.
- Died: October 8, 1969 (aged 53); Wichita, Kansas, U.S.
- Batted: Right Threw: Right

MLB debut
- September 24, 1947, for the Brooklyn Dodgers

Last MLB appearance
- July 15, 1952, for the Chicago Cubs

MLB statistics
- Win–loss record: 24–39
- Earned run average: 3.83
- Strikeouts: 240
- Stats at Baseball Reference

Teams
- Brooklyn Dodgers (1947–1948, 1950); Cincinnati Reds (1950–1951); Chicago Cubs (1952)

James Willard Ramsdell (April 4, 1916 – October 8, 1969) was an American professional baseball pitcher who appeared in 111 games in Major League Baseball for the Brooklyn Dodgers (1947–1948, 1950), Cincinnati Reds (1950–1951) and Chicago Cubs (1952). Known by his middle name, Ramsdell's reliance on his knuckleball led to the nickname "Willie the Knuck." He threw and batted right-handed and was listed as 5 feet 11 inches (1.80 m) tall and 165 pounds (75 kg).

Born in Williamsburg, Kansas, Ramsdell had a 13-season professional career that began in 1938. He joined the Brooklyn farm system in 1942, and then played semipro baseball for three years during World War II. When the war ended, the Dodgers assigned him to Double-A Fort Worth, where he posted standout seasons in both 1947 and 1948, winning 38 of 50 decisions, with 37 complete games.

The Dodgers brought him to the majors as a 31-year-old rookie for his first taste of major-league action in September 1947, then sent him back to the minor leagues for part of 1948 and all of 1949 before he returned to Brooklyn in 1950. He worked mostly out of the bullpen as a Dodger, making only one start, a losing effort on May 26, 1948, against the Cubs, in 34 appearances. Finally, on May 10, 1950, during the cutdown period that called for teams to trim their rosters from 28 to 25 men, the Dodgers sold Ramsdell's contract to the second-division Cincinnati Reds.

By May 23, he had earned a place in Cincinnati's starting rotation, and held it for two seasons. As a Red, he took the ball 53 times in 58 games pitched through the end of 1951, and notched 18 complete games and two shutouts. However, his won–lost mark for the struggling team was only 16–29 (.356), and in 1951 he led the National League in games lost (17) and wild pitches (nine). The Reds traded him to the Cubs in January 1952, and, though he pitched effectively in 19 games (with four starts), posting a strong 2.42 earned run average through mid-July, Chicago sent him to the Los Angeles Angels of the Open-Classification Pacific Coast League. He spent the remainder of his career in the minor leagues, retiring in 1954.

As a major-leaguer, Ramsdell won 24 games and lost 39 (.381), with an ERA of 3.83. His 111 games pitched included 58 starts; all of his complete games and each of his shutouts came as a Red. He also was credited with five saves among his 53 relief appearances. In 4792/3 innings pitched, he allowed 246 runs on 455 hits and 215 bases on balls; he struck out 240.

Willie Ramsdell died in Wichita on October 8, 1969, after a long illness, at the age of 53.
