= Willard Marshall =

American baseball player (1921–2000)

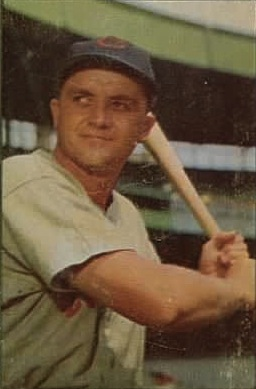
- Marshall in about 1953.
- Right fielder
- Born: February 8, 1921; Richmond, Virginia, U.S.
- Died: November 5, 2000 (aged 79); Norwood, New Jersey, U.S.
- Batted: Left Threw: Right

MLB debut
- April 14, 1942, for the New York Giants

Last MLB appearance
- June 15, 1955, for the Chicago White Sox

MLB statistics
- Batting average: .274
- Home runs: 130
- Runs batted in: 604
- Stats at Baseball Reference

Teams
- New York Giants (1942, 1946–1949); Boston Braves (1950–1952); Cincinnati Reds (1952–1953); Chicago White Sox (1954–1955)

Career highlights and awards
- 3× All-Star (1942, 1947, 1949)

Willard Warren Marshall (February 8, 1921 – November 5, 2000) was a right fielder in Major League Baseball. From 1942 through 1955, Marshall played for the New York Giants (1942, 1946–1949), Boston Braves (1952), Cincinnati Reds (1952-1953) and Chicago White Sox (1954–1955). He batted left-handed and threw right-handed.

== Career ==
In an 11-season career, Marshall posted a .274 batting average with 130 home runs and 604 RBI in 1246 games played. In 1947 he tied a NL record at the time by hitting three home runs in one game. That year, he had a .291 batting average, 36 home runs, 107 runs batted in and a .528 slugging percentage. In 1951 he became the second outfielder in the history of baseball to play an entire season without an error.

He was inducted into the Virginia Sports Hall of Fame in 1990.

== Personal life ==
Marshall lived in Fort Lee, New Jersey and later in Rockleigh, New Jersey. He was buried at Fairview Cemetery in Fairview, New Jersey.
