= 1949 Philadelphia Phillies season =

1949 Philadelphia Phillies
- Also known as the Philadelphia Blue Jays
- League: National League
- Ballpark: Shibe Park
- City: Philadelphia
- Owners: R. R. M. Carpenter, R. R. M. Carpenter Jr.
- General managers: R. R. M. Carpenter Jr.
- Managers: Eddie Sawyer
- Television: WPTZ/WCAU/WFIL
- Radio: WIBG (By Saam, George Walsh)

The 1949 Philadelphia Phillies season was the 67th season in the history of the franchise.

== Offseason ==
- October 4, 1948: Harry Walker was traded by the Phillies to the Chicago Cubs for Bill Nicholson.
- November 15, 1948: Bob Chakales was drafted from the Phillies by the Cleveland Indians in the 1948 minor league draft.
- November 24, 1948: Tommy Lasorda was drafted from the Phillies by the Brooklyn Dodgers in the 1948 minor league draft.
- Prior to 1949 season: Ron Mrozinski was signed by the Phillies as an amateur free agent.

== Regular season ==
On June 2, 1949, the Phillies matched a Major League record with five home runs in one inning in a 12–3 win over the Cincinnati Reds at Shibe Park.

On August 19, 1949, the Phillies held "Eddie Waitkus Night" at Shibe Park. Waitkus was in uniform for the first time since being shot on June 14, 1949, in Chicago by an infatuated woman.

This marked the Phillies' first winning season since 1932, ending an MLB record of 16 consecutive losing seasons. This would remain the longest streak in league history until the Pirates suffered their 17th consecutive losing season in 2009.

=== Season standings ===
National League
| Team | W | L | Pct. | GB | Home | Road |
|---|---|---|---|---|---|---|
| Brooklyn Dodgers | 97 | 57 | .630 | — | 48‍–‍29 | 49‍–‍28 |
| St. Louis Cardinals | 96 | 58 | .623 | 1 | 51‍–‍26 | 45‍–‍32 |
| Philadelphia Phillies | 81 | 73 | .526 | 16 | 40‍–‍37 | 41‍–‍36 |
| Boston Braves | 75 | 79 | .487 | 22 | 43‍–‍34 | 32‍–‍45 |
| New York Giants | 73 | 81 | .474 | 24 | 43‍–‍34 | 30‍–‍47 |
| Pittsburgh Pirates | 71 | 83 | .461 | 26 | 36‍–‍41 | 35‍–‍42 |
| Cincinnati Reds | 62 | 92 | .403 | 35 | 35‍–‍42 | 27‍–‍50 |
| Chicago Cubs | 61 | 93 | .396 | 36 | 33‍–‍44 | 28‍–‍49 |

=== Record vs. opponents ===
1949 National League record Sources:
| Team | BSN | BRO | CHC | CIN | NYG | PHI | PIT | STL |
|---|---|---|---|---|---|---|---|---|
| Boston | — | 10–12 | 12–10 | 12–10–1 | 12–10–2 | 11–11 | 12–10 | 6–16 |
| Brooklyn | 12–10 | — | 17–5 | 17–5 | 14–8 | 11–11 | 16–6 | 10–12–1 |
| Chicago | 10–12 | 5–17 | — | 9–13 | 12–10 | 6–16 | 11–11 | 8–14 |
| Cincinnati | 10–12–1 | 5–17 | 13–9 | — | 7–15 | 13–9 | 9–13 | 5–17–1 |
| New York | 10–12–2 | 8–14 | 10–12 | 15–7 | — | 11–11 | 12–10 | 7–15 |
| Philadelphia | 11–11 | 11–11 | 16–6 | 9–13 | 11–11 | — | 13–9 | 10–12 |
| Pittsburgh | 10–12 | 6–16 | 11–11 | 13–9 | 10–12 | 9–13 | — | 12–10 |
| St. Louis | 16–6 | 12–10–1 | 14–8 | 17–5–1 | 15–7 | 12–10 | 10–12 | — |

=== Game log ===
Legend
| | Phillies win |
| | Phillies loss (via forfeit) |
| | Phillies loss |
| | Postponement |
| **Bold** | Phillies team member |

1949 Game Log
Overall Record: 81–73
April (5–8)

| # | Date | Opponent | Score | Win | Loss | Save | Attendance | Record |
|---|---|---|---|---|---|---|---|---|
| 1 | April 18 | @ Braves | 4–0 | **Ken Heintzelman** (1–0) | Johnny Sain (0–1) | None | 9,195 | 1–0 |
| 2 | April 19 (1) | @ Braves | 3–4 | Nels Potter (1–0) | **Ken Trinkle** (0–1) | None | see 2nd game | 1–1 |
| 3 | April 19 (2) | @ Braves | 2–11 | Vern Bickford (1–0) | **Russ Meyer** (0–1) | None | 30,337 | 1–2 |
| 4 | April 20 | @ Braves | 5–6 | Nels Potter (2–0) | **Jim Konstanty** (0–1) | None | 6,095 | 1–3 |
| – | April 22 | Dodgers | Postponed (rain, wet grounds); Makeup: June 30 | | | | | |
| 5 | April 23 | Dodgers | 6–8 | Erv Palica (1–0) | **Robin Roberts** (0–1) | None | 13,198 | 1–4 |
| 6 | April 24 (1) | Dodgers | 7–4 | **Ken Heintzelman** (2–0) | Carl Erskine (0–1) | None | see 2nd game | 2–4 |
| 7 | April 24 (2) | Dodgers | 5–6 | Ralph Branca (2–0) | **Curt Simmons** (0–1) | Jack Banta (1) | 33,748 | 2–5 |
| 8 | April 25 | Giants | 3–6 | Clint Hartung (2–0) | **Hank Borowy** (0–1) | None | 3,366 | 2–6 |
| 9 | April 26 | Giants | 12–11 (11) | **Schoolboy Rowe** (1–0) | Andy Hansen (0–1) | None | 3,296 | 3–6 |
| 10 | April 27 | Braves | 0–2 | Warren Spahn (1–1) | **Robin Roberts** (0–2) | None | 16,436 | 3–7 |
| 11 | April 28 | Braves | 1–6 | Vern Bickford (2–1) | **Jocko Thompson** (0–1) | None | 2,417 | 3–8 |
| 12 | April 29 | @ Dodgers | 5–2 | **Ken Heintzelman** (3–0) | Joe Hatten (1–1) | None | 8,090 | 4–8 |
| 13 | April 30 | @ Dodgers | 12–4 | **Hank Borowy** (1–1) | Jack Banta (0–1) | None | 19,572 | 5–8 |

May (13–13)

| # | Date | Opponent | Score | Win | Loss | Save | Attendance | Record |
|---|---|---|---|---|---|---|---|---|
| 14 | May 1 | @ Dodgers | 4–2 | **Russ Meyer** (1–1) | Preacher Roe (1–2) | None | 20,507 | 6–8 |
| 15 | May 3 | Cardinals | 7–3 | **Robin Roberts** (1–2) | Ken Johnson (0–1) | **Ken Trinkle** (1) | 16,228 | 7–8 |
| 16 | May 4 | Cardinals | 7–5 | **Ken Heintzelman** (4–0) | Al Brazle (2–1) | **Ken Trinkle** (2) | 14,169 | 8–8 |
| 17 | May 5 | Cardinals | 2–3 | Red Munger (1–0) | **Hank Borowy** (1–2) | None | 4,354 | 8–9 |
| 18 | May 6 | Pirates | 4–3 | **Russ Meyer** (2–1) | Elmer Riddle (0–2) | None | 15,754 | 9–9 |
| 19 | May 7 | Pirates | 4–6 | Hal Gregg (1–0) | **Schoolboy Rowe** (1–1) | None | 6,832 | 9–10 |
| 20 | May 8 (1) | Reds | 7–14 (12) | Ken Raffensberger (3–3) | **Schoolboy Rowe** (1–2) | None | see 2nd game | 9–11 |
| 21 | May 8 (2) | Reds | 8–1 (6)^{^{[a]}} | **Robin Roberts** (2–2) | Eddie Erautt (0–1) | None | 17,707 | 10–11 |
| – | May 9 | Reds | Postponed (rain); Makeup: June 3 as a traditional double-header | | | | | |
| – | May 10 | Reds | Postponed (rain); Makeup: June 3 as a traditional double-header | | | | | |
| 22 | May 11 | Cubs | 2–4 | Emil Kush (3–0) | **Ken Heintzelman** (4–1) | None | 7,433 | 10–12 |
| 23 | May 12 | Cubs | 4–3 | **Hank Borowy** (2–2) | Bob Rush (1–4) | None | 2,506 | 11–12 |
| 24 | May 13 | @ Giants | 1–9 | Larry Jansen (3–2) | **Russ Meyer** (2–2) | None | 21,765 | 11–13 |
| 25 | May 14 | @ Giants | 2–12 | Sheldon Jones (4–3) | **Robin Roberts** (2–3) | None | 17,867 | 11–14 |
| 26 | May 15 | @ Giants | 3–7 | Monty Kennedy (3–2) | **Curt Simmons** (0–2) | None | 24,637 | 11–15 |
| 27 | May 17 | @ Cardinals | 5–4 (12) | **Robin Roberts** (3–3) | Al Brazle (3–2) | None | 12,357 | 12–15 |
| 28 | May 18 | @ Cardinals | 3–2 | **Curt Simmons** (1–2) | Ted Wilks (2–2) | None | 2,666 | 13–15 |
| – | May 19 | @ Cubs | Postponed (weather, wet grounds, threatening weather); Makeup: June 15 as a traditional double-header | | | | | |
| – | May 20 | @ Cubs | Postponed (cold); Makeup: July 30 as a traditional double-header | | | | | |
| 29 | May 21 | @ Cubs | 5–1 | **Hank Borowy** (3–2) | Dutch Leonard (1–4) | None | 11,839 | 14–15 |
| 30 | May 22 (1) | @ Pirates | 6–5 | **Robin Roberts** (4–3) | Elmer Riddle (0–4) | **Jim Konstanty** (1) | 31,467 | 15–15 |
| – | May 22 (2) | @ Pirates | Postponed (rain and wet grounds); Makeup: June 20 | | | | | |
| 31 | May 24 | @ Reds | 3–4 (11) | Harry Gumbert (2–1) | **Curt Simmons** (1–3) | None | 16,111 | 15–16 |
| 32 | May 25 | @ Reds | 2–3 | Buddy Lively (4–1) | **Ken Heintzelman** (4–2) | None | 4,870 | 15–17 |
| 33 | May 27 | Giants | 9–3 | **Curt Simmons** (2–3) | Clint Hartung (4–4) | **Jim Konstanty** (2) | 10,397 | 16–17 |
| 34 | May 28 | Giants | 5–2 | **Hank Borowy** (4–2) | Larry Jansen (4–4) | None | 6,340 | 17–17 |
| 35 | May 29 (1) | Giants | 2–4 (15) | Dave Koslo (1–0) | **Jim Konstanty** (0–2) | None | see 2nd game | 17–18 |
| 36 | May 29 (2) | Giants | 0–3 (7)^{^{[b]}} | Hank Behrman (2–0) | **Russ Meyer** (2–3) | None | 22,350 | 17–19 |
| 37 | May 30 (1) | Braves | 3–7 | Bill Voiselle (3–1) | **Ken Heintzelman** (4–3) | Nels Potter (3) | see 2nd game | 17–20 |
| 38 | May 30 (2) | Braves | 6–5 (10) | **Russ Meyer** (3–3) | Bobby Hogue (0–1) | None | 21,933 | 18–20 |
| 39 | May 31 | Braves | 6–7 | Nels Potter (4–3) | **Schoolboy Rowe** (1–3) | None | 2,386 | 18–21 |

June (20–11)

| # | Date | Opponent | Score | Win | Loss | Save | Attendance | Record |
|---|---|---|---|---|---|---|---|---|
| 40 | June 1 | Reds | 4–3 (10) | **Robin Roberts** (5–3) | Harry Gumbert (2–3) | None | 6,845 | 19–21 |
| 41 | June 2 | Reds | 12–3 | **Schoolboy Rowe** (2–3) | Ken Raffensberger (6–4) | None | 10,549 | 20–21 |
| 42 | June 3 (1) | Reds | 2–3 | Harry Gumbert (3–3) | **Jim Konstanty** (0–3) | None | see 2nd game | 20–22 |
| 43 | June 3 (2) | Reds | 3–1 | **Russ Meyer** (4–3) | Buddy Lively (4–3) | None | 7,911 | 21–22 |
| 44 | June 4 | Cubs | 1–0 | **Ken Heintzelman** (5–3) | Bob Rush (3–6) | None | 6,190 | 22–22 |
| 45 | June 5 (1) | Cubs | 7–2 | **Hank Borowy** (5–2) | Johnny Schmitz (2–3) | None | see 2nd game | 23–22 |
| 46 | June 5 (2) | Cubs | 7–8 | Bob Rush (4–6) | **Russ Meyer** (4–4) | None | 15,240 | 23–23 |
| 47 | June 7 | Pirates | 6–5 | **Schoolboy Rowe** (3–3) | Murry Dickson (2–8) | None | 12,105 | 24–23 |
| 48 | June 8 | Pirates | 2–0 | **Robin Roberts** (6–3) | Tiny Bonham (0–2) | None | 10,136 | 25–23 |
| 49 | June 9 | Pirates | 4–3 (18) | **Jim Konstanty** (1–3) | Murry Dickson (2–9) | None | 4,095 | 26–23 |
| 50 | June 10 | Cardinals | 3–2 | **Ken Heintzelman** (6–3) | Al Brazle (6–3) | None | 23,332 | 27–23 |
| 51 | June 11 | Cardinals | 2–6 | Red Munger (4–2) | **Hank Borowy** (5–3) | None | 12,199 | 27–24 |
| 52 | June 12 (1) | Cardinals | 3–7 | Harry Brecheen (5–3) | **Curt Simmons** (2–4) | None | see 2nd game | 27–25 |
| 53 | June 12 (2) | Cardinals | 8–3 | **Robin Roberts** (7–3) | Gerry Staley (3–3) | None | 33,224 | 28–25 |
| 54 | June 14 | @ Cubs | 9–2 | **Russ Meyer** (5–4) | Bob Muncrief (1–7) | None | 7,815 | 29–25 |
| 55 | June 15 (1) | @ Cubs | 4–1 | **Ken Heintzelman** (7–3) | Bob Rush (4–8) | None | see 2nd game | 30–25 |
| 56 | June 15 (2) | @ Cubs | 3–0 | **Hank Borowy** (6–3) | Johnny Schmitz (2–5) | **Robin Roberts** (1) | 18,809 | 31–25 |
| 57 | June 16 | @ Cubs | 4–3 | **Jim Konstanty** (2–3) | Bob Muncrief (1–8) | None | 4,899 | 32–25 |
| 58 | June 17 | @ Cardinals | 8–0 | **Robin Roberts** (8–3) | Harry Brecheen (5–4) | None | 17,676 | 33–25 |
| 59 | June 18 | @ Cardinals | 3–4 | Howie Pollet (7–4) | **Curt Simmons** (2–5) | None | 20,034 | 33–26 |
| 60 | June 19 | @ Cardinals | 5–6 | Ted Wilks (5–2) | **Robin Roberts** (8–4) | None | 20,136 | 33–27 |
| 61 | June 20 | @ Pirates | 7–1 | **Russ Meyer** (6–4) | Bill Werle (4–4) | None | 30,066 | 34–27 |
| 62 | June 21 | @ Pirates | 9–4 | **Hank Borowy** (7–3) | Murry Dickson (2–10) | None | 32,332 | 35–27 |
| 63 | June 22 | @ Pirates | 3–12 | Vic Lombardi (1–1) | **Robin Roberts** (8–5) | None | 8,957 | 35–28 |
| 64 | June 23 | @ Pirates | 9–3 | **Curt Simmons** (3–5) | Elmer Riddle (1–7) | None | 10,283 | 36–28 |
| – | June 24 | @ Reds | Postponed (rain); Makeup: August 4 as a traditional double-header | | | | | |
| 65 | June 25 | @ Reds | 6–5 | **Ken Heintzelman** (8–3) | Howie Fox (4–6) | **Robin Roberts** (2) | 5,681 | 37–28 |
| 66 | June 26 (1) | @ Reds | 3–4 (10) | Harry Gumbert (4–3) | **Curt Simmons** (3–6) | None | see 2nd game | 37–29 |
| 67 | June 26 (2) | @ Reds | 2–5 | Herm Wehmeier (2–3) | **Hank Borowy** (7–4) | None | 14,522 | 37–30 |
| 68 | June 28 | Dodgers | 3–5 | Preacher Roe (7–2) | **Robin Roberts** (8–6) | None | 22,997 | 37–31 |
| 69 | June 29 | Dodgers | 1–5 | Ralph Branca (10–1) | **Curt Simmons** (3–7) | None | 36,814 | 37–32 |
| 70 | June 30 | Dodgers | 4–2 | **Ken Heintzelman** (9–3) | Joe Hatten (6–4) | None | 9,660 | 38–32 |

July (12–15)

| # | Date | Opponent | Score | Win | Loss | Save | Attendance | Record |
|---|---|---|---|---|---|---|---|---|
| 71 | July 1 | @ Braves | 1–2 (12) | Vern Bickford (10–4) | **Hank Borowy** (7–5) | None | 17,058 | 38–33 |
| 72 | July 2 | @ Braves | 3–2 | **Blix Donnelly** (1–0) | Warren Spahn (9–7) | None | 21,661 | 39–33 |
| 73 | July 3 | @ Braves | 7–0 | **Robin Roberts** (9–6) | Johnny Sain (5–9) | None | 10,540 | 40–33 |
| 74 | July 4 (1) | @ Dodgers | 1–7 | Preacher Roe (8–2) | **Curt Simmons** (3–8) | None | see 2nd game | 40–34 |
| 75 | July 4 (2) | @ Dodgers | 4–8 | Don Newcombe (6–2) | **Jocko Thompson** (0–2) | Jack Banta (2) | 11,754 | 40–35 |
| 76 | July 5 | @ Dodgers | 7–2 | **Ken Heintzelman** (10–3) | Joe Hatten (6–5) | None | 24,535 | 41–35 |
| – | July 6 | @ Giants | Postponed (rain); Makeup: August 13 as a traditional double-header | | | | | |
| 77 | July 7 | @ Giants | 3–11 | Dave Koslo (5–2) | **Hank Borowy** (7–6) | None | 21,841 | 41–36 |
| 78 | July 8 | Braves | 3–4 (16) | Bobby Hogue (1–2) | **Schoolboy Rowe** (3–4) | None | 11,238 | 41–37 |
| 79 | July 9 | Braves | 3–4 | Johnny Sain (6–9) | **Blix Donnelly** (1–1) | Nels Potter (7) | 6,854 | 41–38 |
| – | July 10 | Braves | Postponed (rain); Makeup: September 4 as a traditional double-header | | | | | |
| – | July 12 | **1949 Major League Baseball All-Star Game at Ebbets Field in Brooklyn** | | | | | | |
| 80 | July 14 | Cardinals | 1–0 | **Ken Heintzelman** (11–3) | Max Lanier (0–1) | None | 13,379 | 42–38 |
| 81 | July 15 | Cardinals | 0–1 | Howie Pollet (12–5) | **Robin Roberts** (9–7) | None | 14,395 | 42–39 |
| 82 | July 16 | Cardinals | 4–2 | **Hank Borowy** (8–6) | Harry Brecheen (6–7) | **Jim Konstanty** (3) | 9,854 | 43–39 |
| 83 | July 17 (1) | Pirates | 1–2 (5) | Cliff Chambers (5–1) | **Russ Meyer** (6–5) | None | 12,761 | 43–40 |
| – | July 17 (2) | Pirates | Postponed (rain); Makeup: August 25 as a traditional double-header | | | | | |
| 84 | July 18 | Pirates | 2–7 | Murry Dickson (4–11) | **Jim Konstanty** (2–4) | None | 4,068 | 43–41 |
| 85 | July 19 | Cubs | 1–0 | **Ken Heintzelman** (12–3) | Doyle Lade (0–1) | None | 7,076 | 44–41 |
| 86 | July 20 | Cubs | 3–4 (11) | Dutch Leonard (4–11) | **Curt Simmons** (3–9) | None | 7,036 | 44–42 |
| 87 | July 21 | Cubs | 8–4 | **Hank Borowy** (9–6) | Monk Dubiel (3–6) | None | 3,082 | 45–42 |
| 88 | July 22 | Reds | 2–1 | **Russ Meyer** (7–5) | Kent Peterson (2–2) | **Robin Roberts** (3) | 10,905 | 46–42 |
| 89 | July 23 | Reds | 8–2 | **Ken Heintzelman** (13–3) | Johnny Vander Meer (2–6) | None | 6,581 | 47–42 |
| 90 | July 24 (1) | Reds | 1–10 | Ken Raffensberger (10–9) | **Curt Simmons** (3–10) | None | see 2nd game | 47–43 |
| 91 | July 24 (2) | Reds | 3–4 | Herm Wehmeier (4–6) | **Robin Roberts** (9–8) | None | 16,796 | 47–44 |
| 92 | July 26 | @ Cardinals | 5–9 | Harry Brecheen (8–7) | **Robin Roberts** (9–9) | None | 21,052 | 47–45 |
| 93 | July 27 | @ Cardinals | 3–7 | Red Munger (9–4) | **Hank Borowy** (9–7) | None | 19,984 | 47–46 |
| 94 | July 28 | @ Cardinals | 2–10 | Al Brazle (10–5) | **Ken Heintzelman** (13–4) | None | 14,570 | 47–47 |
| – | July 29 | @ Cubs | Postponed (rain); Makeup: September 21 as a traditional double-header | | | | | |
| 95 | July 30 (1) | @ Cubs | 4–3 | **Russ Meyer** (8–5) | Doyle Lade (1–2) | None | see 2nd game | 48–47 |
| 96 | July 30 (2) | @ Cubs | 9–1 | **Robin Roberts** (10–9) | Johnny Schmitz (6–8) | None | 33,461 | 49–47 |
| 97 | July 31 | @ Cubs | 5–4 (10) | **Jim Konstanty** (3–4) | Bob Muncrief (3–9) | None | 18,926 | 50–47 |

August (14–15)

| # | Date | Opponent | Score | Win | Loss | Save | Attendance | Record |
|---|---|---|---|---|---|---|---|---|
| 98 | August 2 | @ Reds | 3–11 | Herm Wehmeier (6–6) | **Ken Heintzelman** (13–5) | None | 9,097 | 50–48 |
| 99 | August 3 | @ Reds | 0–2 | Ken Raffensberger (11–11) | **Robin Roberts** (10–10) | None | 2,690 | 50–49 |
| 100 | August 4 (1) | @ Reds | 5–8 | Kent Peterson (4–3) | **Russ Meyer** (8–6) | Ewell Blackwell (1) | see 2nd game | 50–50 |
| 101 | August 4 (2) | @ Reds | 1–9 | Johnny Vander Meer (3–6) | **Hank Borowy** (9–8) | None | 5,709 | 50–51 |
| 102 | August 5 | @ Pirates | 0–1 | Bill Werle (8–8) | **Schoolboy Rowe** (3–5) | None | 24,944 | 50–52 |
| 103 | August 6 | @ Pirates | 4–3 | **Jim Konstanty** (4–4) | Harry Gumbert (5–5) | None | 13,260 | 51–52 |
| 104 | August 7 (1) | @ Pirates | 7–3 | **Hank Borowy** (10–8) | Cliff Chambers (6–3) | None | see 2nd game | 52–52 |
| 105 | August 7 (2) | @ Pirates | 5–4 | **Jim Konstanty** (5–4) | Bob Chesnes (5–7) | **Robin Roberts** (4) | 27,928 | 53–52 |
| 106 | August 9 | Dodgers | 1–8 | Carl Erskine (2–1) | **Robin Roberts** (10–11) | None | 21,463 | 53–53 |
| 107 | August 10 | Dodgers | 5–7 | Jack Banta (5–4) | **Jim Konstanty** (5–5) | None | 16,426 | 53–54 |
| 108 | August 11 | Dodgers | 7–10 | Joe Hatten (10–6) | **Schoolboy Rowe** (3–6) | Jack Banta (3) | 15,856 | 53–55 |
| 109 | August 12 | @ Giants | 2–0 (7) | **Hank Borowy** (11–8) | Sheldon Jones (9–8) | None | 4,099 | 54–55 |
| – | August 13 (1)^{^{[c]}} | @ Giants | Postponed (rain); Makeup: August 14 as a traditional double-header | | | | | |
| – | August 13 (2)^{^{[c]}} | @ Giants | Postponed (rain); Makeup: September 6 as a traditional double-header | | | | | |
| 110 | August 14 (1)^{^{[c]}} | @ Giants | 1–8 | Dave Koslo (8–6) | **Robin Roberts** (10–12) | None | see 2nd game | 54–56 |
| 111 | August 14 (2)^{^{[c]}} | @ Giants | 0–1 | Larry Jansen (13–11) | **Russ Meyer** (8–7) | None | 25,402 | 54–57 |
| 112 | August 16 | @ Dodgers | 2–1 (12) | **Ken Heintzelman** (14–5) | Don Newcombe (11–5) | None | 20,071 | 55–57 |
| 113 | August 17 | @ Dodgers | 11–7 | **Jim Konstanty** (6–5) | Erv Palica (7–7) | **Russ Meyer** (1) | 16,172 | 56–57 |
| 114 | August 18 | @ Dodgers | 9–5 | **Hank Borowy** (12–8) | Rex Barney (6–7) | **Jim Konstanty** (4) | 7,327 | 57–57 |
| 115 | August 19 | Giants | 7–1 | **Robin Roberts** (11–12) | Dave Koslo (8–7) | None | 19,654 | 58–57 |
| 116 | August 20 | Giants | 9–3 | **Russ Meyer** (9–7) | Monty Kennedy (9–9) | **Jim Konstanty** (5) | 9,110 | 59–57 |
| 117 | August 21 (1) | Giants | 4–0 | **Ken Heintzelman** (15–5) | Sheldon Jones (9–9) | None | see 2nd game | 60–57 |
| 118 | August 21 (2) | Giants | 2–4^{^{[d]}} (9) | None | None | None | 19,742 | 60–58 |
| 119 | August 23 | Reds | 4–3 (13) | **Robin Roberts** (12–12) | Kent Peterson (4–5) | None | 6,976 | 61–58 |
| 120 | August 25 (1) | Pirates | 1–5 | Murry Dickson (7–12) | **Russ Meyer** (9–8) | None | see 2nd game | 61–59 |
| 121 | August 25 (2) | Pirates | 4–2 | **Robin Roberts** (13–12) | Junior Walsh (1–2) | None | 7,179 | 62–59 |
| 122 | August 26 | Pirates | 2–3 | Bill Werle (10–9) | **Ken Heintzelman** (15–6) | None | 9,586 | 62–60 |
| 123 | August 27 | Pirates | 2–8 | Tiny Bonham (7–4) | **Schoolboy Rowe** (3–7) | None | 6,070 | 62–61 |
| 124 | August 28 (1) | Cubs | 4–7 | Doyle Lade (4–3) | **Hank Borowy** (12–9) | None | see 2nd game | 62–62 |
| 125 | August 28 (2) | Cubs | 8–2 | **Russ Meyer** (10–8) | Dewey Adkins (0–3) | None | 12,719 | 63–62 |
| 126 | August 29 | Cubs | 6–5 | **Blix Donnelly** (2–1) | Bob Muncrief (5–10) | **Jim Konstanty** (6) | 2,802 | 64–62 |
| – | August 31 | Cardinals | Postponed (rain); Makeup: September 1 | | | | | |

September (16–10)

| # | Date | Opponent | Score | Win | Loss | Save | Attendance | Record |
|---|---|---|---|---|---|---|---|---|
| 127 | September 1 | Cardinals | 0–4 | Howie Pollet (17–8) | **Ken Heintzelman** (15–7) | None | 14,138 | 64–63 |
| 128 | September 2 | Braves | 6–3 | **Jim Konstanty** (7–5) | Bill Voiselle (6–5) | None | 6,538 | 65–63 |
| 129 | September 3 | Braves | 10–4 | **Robin Roberts** (14–12) | Bob Hall (5–4) | None | 5,273 | 66–63 |
| 130 | September 4 (1) | Braves | 9–8 | **Ken Trinkle** (1–1) | Nels Potter (6–9) | None | see 2nd game | 67–63 |
| 131 | September 4 (2) | Braves | 8–7 | **Curt Simmons** (4–10) | Vern Bickford (14–9) | None | 18,727 | 68–63 |
| 132 | September 5 (1) | @ Giants | 9–7 | **Ken Heintzelman** (16–7) | Adrián Zabala (2–2) | **Jim Konstanty** (7) | see 2nd game | 69–63 |
| 133 | September 5 (2) | @ Giants | 4–2 | **Russ Meyer** (11–8) | Dave Koslo (8–11) | None | 16,577 | 70–63 |
| 134 | September 6 (1)^{^{[c]}} | @ Giants | 4–2 (10) | **Jim Konstanty** (8–5) | Larry Jansen (15–14) | None | see 2nd game | 71–63 |
| 135 | September 6 (2)^{^{[c]}} | @ Giants | 1–4 | Sheldon Jones (12–10) | **Hank Borowy** (12–10) | None | 4,150 | 71–64 |
| 136 | September 8 | @ Braves | 3–1 | **Russ Meyer** (12–8) | Johnny Sain (10–14) | None | 5,856 | 72–64 |
| – | September 9 | @ Braves | Postponed (rain); Makeup: September 11 as a traditional double-header | | | | | |
| 137 | September 10 | @ Braves | 0–1 | Warren Spahn (18–12) | **Robin Roberts** (14–13) | None | 5,450 | 72–65 |
| 138 | September 11 (1) | @ Braves | 3–1 | **Ken Heintzelman** (17–7) | Bill Voiselle (6–7) | None | see 2nd game | 73–65 |
| 139 | September 11 (2) | @ Braves | 6–3 | **Russ Meyer** (13–8) | Vern Bickford (14–10) | **Curt Simmons** (1) | 10,801 | 74–65 |
| 140 | September 13 | @ Pirates | 6–11 | Cliff Chambers (10–7) | **Hank Borowy** (12–11) | None | 11,878 | 74–66 |
| 141 | September 14 | @ Pirates | 12–4 | **Robin Roberts** (15–13) | Junior Walsh (1–4) | None | 3,920 | 75–66 |
| 142 | September 16 | @ Reds | 1–2 | Ken Raffensberger (16–15) | **Ken Heintzelman** (17–8) | None | 1,185 | 75–67 |
| 143 | September 17 | @ Reds | 4–0 | **Russ Meyer** (14–8) | Herm Wehmeier (11–10) | None | 2,065 | 76–67 |
| 144 | September 18 | @ Cardinals | 3–15 | Red Munger (15–6) | **Robin Roberts** (15–14) | Gerry Staley (5) | 24,319 | 76–68 |
| 145 | September 19 | @ Cardinals | 4–3 | **Jocko Thompson** (1–2) | Howie Pollet (19–9) | None | 16,874 | 77–68 |
| 146 | September 20 | @ Cardinals | 5–7 | Fred Martin (6–0) | **Ken Heintzelman** (17–9) | Gerry Staley (6) | 9,642 | 77–69 |
| 147 | September 21 (1) | @ Cubs | 3–1 | **Russ Meyer** (15–8) | Warren Hacker (5–8) | None | see 2nd game | 78–69 |
| 148 | September 21 (2) | @ Cubs | 6–9 | Monk Dubiel (6–9) | **Robin Roberts** (15–15) | None | 5,572 | 78–70 |
| 149 | September 22 | @ Cubs | 2–3 | Dewey Adkins (2–4) | **Hank Borowy** (12–12) | None | 1,813 | 78–71 |
| 150 | September 24 | @ Dodgers | 1–8 | Don Newcombe (16–8) | **Jocko Thompson** (1–3) | None | 34,083 | 78–72 |
| 151 | September 25 | @ Dodgers | 5–3 | **Russ Meyer** (16–8) | Jack Banta (9–6) | None | 33,452 | 79–72 |
| 152 | September 28 | Giants | 2–0 | **Russ Meyer** (17–8) | Sheldon Jones (15–12) | None | 1,996 | 80–72 |

October (1–1)

| # | Date | Opponent | Score | Win | Loss | Save | Attendance | Record |
|---|---|---|---|---|---|---|---|---|
| 153 | October 1 | Dodgers | 6–4 | **Jim Konstanty** (9–5) | Preacher Roe (15–6) | None | 29,165 | 81–72 |
| 154 | October 2 | Dodgers | 7–9 (10) | Jack Banta (10–6) | **Ken Heintzelman** (17–10) | None | 36,765 | 81–73 |

^{^[a]}The second game on May 8, 1949, was called due to the Pennsylvania Sunday curfew at the end of the sixth inning with the score 8–1.
^{^[b]}The second game on May 29, 1949, was called due to the Pennsylvania Sunday curfew at the end of the seventh inning with the score 0–3.
^{^[c]}The original schedule indicated single games on August 13 (which became a double-header after the July 7 postponement), 14 (which became a double-header after the August 13 postponement), and 15 (later moved to September 6) with no games scheduled on September 6 (which became a double-header from the August 13 postponement and the August 15 schedule change).
^{^[d]}The second game on August 21, 1949, was forfeited in favor of the New York Giants. Contemporary newspaper accounts indicate a 9–0 final score as a result of the forfeiture, but Baseball-Reference indicates a 2–4 score and Phillies loss.

=== Roster ===
1949 Philadelphia Phillies
**Roster**
| **Pitchers**: 39 Charlie Bicknell; 20 Hank Borowy; 30 Blix Donnelly; 27 Ken Heintzelman; 35 Jim Konstanty; 34 Russ Meyer; 41 Bob Miller; 36 Robin Roberts; 19 Schoolboy Rowe; 28 Curt Simmons; 37 Jocko Thompson; 22 Ken Trinkle | **Catchers**: 29 Stan Lopata; 21 Andy Seminick; 25 Ken Silvestri; 26 Hal Wagner; **Infielders**: 7 Buddy Blattner; 9 Putsy Caballero; 3 Bill Glynn; 9 Mike Goliat; 33,17 Granny Hamner; 6 Willie Jones; 5 Eddie Miller; 8 Dick Sisler; 4 Eddie Waitkus | **Outfielders**: 1 Richie Ashburn; 16 Johnny Blatnik; 14 Del Ennis; 17 Stan Hollmig; 15 Jackie Mayo; 12 Bill Nicholson; 33 Ed Sanicki; **Other batters**: 3 Bert Haas | **Manager**: 24 Eddie Sawyer; **Coaches**: 11 Benny Bengough; 32 Dusty Cooke; 38 George Earnshaw; 40 Maje McDonnell; 31 Cy Perkins |

== Player stats ==
=== Batting ===
==== Starters by position ====
Note: Pos = Position; G = Games played; AB = At bats; H = Hits; Avg. = Batting average; HR = Home runs; RBI = Runs batted in

| Pos | Player | G | AB | H | Avg. | HR | RBI |
|---|---|---|---|---|---|---|---|
| C | Andy Seminick | 109 | 334 | 81 | .243 | 24 | 68 |
| 1B | Dick Sisler | 121 | 412 | 119 | .289 | 7 | 50 |
| 2B | Eddie Miller | 85 | 266 | 55 | .207 | 6 | 29 |
| SS | Granny Hamner | 154 | 662 | 174 | .263 | 6 | 53 |
| 3B | Willie Jones | 149 | 532 | 130 | .244 | 19 | 77 |
| OF | Del Ennis | 154 | 610 | 184 | .302 | 25 | 110 |
| OF | Bill Nicholson | 98 | 299 | 70 | .234 | 11 | 40 |
| OF | Richie Ashburn | 154 | 662 | 188 | .284 | 1 | 37 |

==== Other batters ====
Note: G = Games played; AB = At bats; H = Hits; Avg. = Batting average; HR = Home runs; RBI = Runs batted in

| Player | G | AB | H | Avg. | HR | RBI |
|---|---|---|---|---|---|---|
| Stan Hollmig | 81 | 251 | 64 | .255 | 2 | 26 |
| Stan Lopata | 83 | 240 | 65 | .271 | 8 | 27 |
| Eddie Waitkus | 54 | 209 | 64 | .306 | 1 | 28 |
| Mike Goliat | 55 | 189 | 40 | .212 | 3 | 19 |
| Buddy Blattner | 64 | 97 | 24 | .247 | 5 | 21 |
| Putsy Caballero | 29 | 68 | 19 | .279 | 0 | 3 |
| Jackie Mayo | 45 | 39 | 5 | .128 | 0 | 2 |
| Ed Sanicki | 7 | 13 | 3 | .231 | 3 | 7 |
| Bill Glynn | 8 | 10 | 2 | .200 | 0 | 1 |
| Johnny Blatnik | 6 | 8 | 1 | .125 | 0 | 0 |
| Ken Silvestri | 4 | 4 | 0 | .000 | 0 | 0 |
| Hal Wagner | 1 | 4 | 0 | .000 | 0 | 0 |
| Bert Haas | 2 | 1 | 0 | .000 | 0 | 0 |

=== Pitching ===
==== Starting pitchers ====
Note: G = Games pitched; IP = Innings pitched; W = Wins; L = Losses; ERA = Earned run average; SO = Strikeouts

| Player | G | IP | W | L | ERA | SO |
|---|---|---|---|---|---|---|
| Ken Heintzelman | 33 | 250.0 | 17 | 10 | 3.02 | 65 |
| Robin Roberts | 43 | 226.2 | 15 | 15 | 3.69 | 95 |
| Russ Meyer | 37 | 213.0 | 17 | 8 | 3.08 | 78 |
| Hank Borowy | 28 | 193.1 | 12 | 12 | 4.19 | 73 |

==== Other pitchers ====
Note: G = Games pitched; IP = Innings pitched; W = Wins; L = Losses; ERA = Earned run average; SO = Strikeouts

| Player | G | IP | W | L | ERA | SO |
|---|---|---|---|---|---|---|
| Curt Simmons | 38 | 131.1 | 4 | 10 | 4.59 | 83 |
| Blix Donnelly | 23 | 78.1 | 2 | 1 | 5.06 | 36 |
| Schoolboy Rowe | 23 | 65.1 | 3 | 7 | 4.82 | 22 |
| Jocko Thompson | 8 | 31.1 | 1 | 3 | 6.89 | 12 |

==== Relief pitchers ====
Note: G = Games pitched; W = Wins; L = Losses; SV = Saves; ERA = Earned run average; SO = Strikeouts

| Player | G | W | L | SV | ERA | SO |
|---|---|---|---|---|---|---|
| Jim Konstanty | 53 | 9 | 5 | 7 | 3.25 | 43 |
| Ken Trinkle | 42 | 1 | 1 | 2 | 4.00 | 14 |
| Charlie Bicknell | 13 | 0 | 0 | 0 | 7.62 | 4 |
| Bob Miller | 3 | 0 | 0 | 0 | 0.00 | 0 |

== Farm system ==
| Level | Team | League | Manager |
|---|---|---|---|
| AAA | Toronto Maple Leafs | International League | Del Bissonette |
| A | Utica Blue Sox | Eastern League | Patrick Colgan |
| B | Terre Haute Phillies | Illinois–Indiana–Iowa League | Leon Riley |
| B | Wilmington Blue Rocks | Interstate League | Jack Sanford |
| B | Portland Pilots | New England League | Skeeter Newsome |
| C | Schenectady Blue Jays | Canadian–American League | Dick Carter |
| C | Vandergrift Pioneers | Middle Atlantic League | George Savino |
| C | Salina Blue Jays | Western Association | Joe Gantenbein |
| D | Seaford Eagles | Eastern Shore League | Paul Galin |
| D | Klamath Falls Gems | Far West League | Hub Kittle |
| D | Americus Phillies | Georgia–Florida League | Eddie Murphy |
| D | Carbondale Pioneers | North Atlantic League | Barney Lutz |
| D | Bradford Blue Wings | PONY League | Dan Carnevale |
| D | Appleton Papermakers | Wisconsin State League | Fred Clemence |

LEAGUE CHAMPIONS: Portland, Bradford
