= Stan Hollmig =

American baseball player (1926–1981)

- Outfielder
- Born: January 2, 1926; Fredericksburg, Texas, U.S.
- Died: December 4, 1981 (aged 55); San Antonio, Texas, U.S.
- Batted: Right Threw: Right

MLB debut
- April 19, 1949, for the Philadelphia Phillies

Last MLB appearance
- September 26, 1951, for the Philadelphia Phillies

MLB statistics
- Batting average: .253
- Home runs: 2
- Runs batted in: 27
- Stats at Baseball Reference

Teams
- Philadelphia Phillies (1949–1951)

Stanley Ernest Hollmig (January 2, 1926 – December 4, 1981) was an American professional baseball player and scout. Born in Fredericksburg, Texas, he was an outfielder who played in 94 games over all or parts of three seasons (1949–51) in Major League Baseball for the Philadelphia Phillies.

Nicknamed "Hondo", Hollmig was listed as 6 feet 2 inches (1.88 m) tall and 190 pounds (86 kg); he threw and batted right-handed. He signed with the Phillies after attending Texas A&M University, where he was an All-Conference football player.

== Semi-regular for 1949 Phillies ==
Hollmig spent only one season (1948) in the club's farm system before earning a spot with the 1949 Phillies. He started 65 games as a right fielder (left-handed-swinging Bill Nicholson started 79), collected 64 hits and batted .255. On back-to-back days, June 7–8, he hit his only two MLB home runs against the Pittsburgh Pirates' Vic Lombardi (a three-run shot) and Tiny Bonham (a two-run homer), respectively. In the latter game, he provided all the run support needed for Phillies' pitcher (and eventual Baseball Hall of Famer) Robin Roberts, who hurled a 2–0, shutout victory.

== Key hits during 1950 stretch run ==
Hollmig was a member of the pennant-winning 1950 Whiz Kids, but appeared in only 11 games and had 12 plate appearances all season. Hollmig collected three hits, with two doubles. One of those doubles came September 15 as a pinch hitter in the ninth inning of a game against the Cincinnati Reds at Shibe Park. Batting for Jackie Mayo with the Phils trailing, 5–3, Hollmig rifled a two-bagger to right field, sending Del Ennis to third base. Hollmig was then removed for a pinch runner, who scored along with Ennis on a game-tying double hit by Granny Hamner. The contest went into extra innings, with the Phillies again rallying from a two-run deficit in the 18th to tie the score—then winning 8–7 in the 19th. In his only start of the season, two days later against the Pirates, Hollmig's RBI single was a key hit in a five-run rally that carried Philadelphia to a 5–3 victory. Each win was crucial, because the Phillies and Brooklyn Dodgers would battle to the season's final day before Hollmig's club prevailed and averted a best-of-three tie-breaker series. Hollmig did not play in the 1950 World Series.

He spent most of 1951 in the minor leagues before making two final appearances as a pinch hitter for Philadelphia during September. He then spent seven more seasons in the minors, retiring after the 1958 campaign. After his playing career, Hollmig was a scout for the Reds and Houston Astros. All told, he had 67 hits in the big leagues, with 13 doubles and six triples accompanying his two home runs.

He died from cancer in San Antonio, Texas, at age 55 in 1981.
