= 1949 Chicago Cubs season =

1949 Chicago Cubs
- League: National League
- Ballpark: Wrigley Field
- City: Chicago
- Record: 61–93 (.396)
- League place: 8th
- Owners: Philip K. Wrigley
- General managers: James T. Gallagher
- Managers: Charlie Grimm, Frankie Frisch
- Television: WGN-TV (Jack Brickhouse, Harry Creighton); WBKB (Joe Wilson); WENR (Rogers Hornsby, Bill Brundige)
- Radio: WIND (Bert Wilson)

The 1949 Chicago Cubs season was the 78th season of the Chicago Cubs franchise, the 74th in the National League and the 34th at Wrigley Field. The Cubs finished eighth and last in the National League with a record of 61–93.

== Offseason ==
- October 4, 1948: Bill Nicholson was traded by the Cubs to the Philadelphia Phillies for Harry Walker.
- November 8, 1948: Bob Speake was signed as an amateur free agent by the Cubs.

== Regular season ==
=== Season standings ===
National League
Team	W	L	Pct.	GB	Home	Road
Brooklyn Dodgers	97	57	.630	—	48‍–‍29	49‍–‍28
St. Louis Cardinals	96	58	.623	1	51‍–‍26	45‍–‍32
Philadelphia Phillies	81	73	.526	16	40‍–‍37	41‍–‍36
Boston Braves	75	79	.487	22	43‍–‍34	32‍–‍45
New York Giants	73	81	.474	24	43‍–‍34	30‍–‍47
Pittsburgh Pirates	71	83	.461	26	36‍–‍41	35‍–‍42
Cincinnati Reds	62	92	.403	35	35‍–‍42	27‍–‍50
Chicago Cubs	61	93	.396	36	33‍–‍44	28‍–‍49

=== Record vs. opponents ===
1949 National League record Sources:
Team	BSN	BRO	CHC	CIN	NYG	PHI	PIT	STL
Boston	—	10–12	12–10	12–10–1	12–10–2	11–11	12–10	6–16
Brooklyn	12–10	—	17–5	17–5	14–8	11–11	16–6	10–12–1
Chicago	10–12	5–17	—	9–13	12–10	6–16	11–11	8–14
Cincinnati	10–12–1	5–17	13–9	—	7–15	13–9	9–13	5–17–1
New York	10–12–2	8–14	10–12	15–7	—	11–11	12–10	7–15
Philadelphia	11–11	11–11	16–6	9–13	11–11	—	13–9	10–12
Pittsburgh	10–12	6–16	11–11	13–9	10–12	9–13	—	12–10
St. Louis	16–6	12–10–1	14–8	17–5–1	15–7	12–10	10–12	—

=== Notable transactions ===
- June 15, 1949: Peanuts Lowrey and Harry Walker were traded by the Cubs to the Cincinnati Reds for Frank Baumholtz and Hank Sauer.

=== Roster ===
1949 Chicago Cubs
Roster
Pitchers: 37 Dewey Adkins; 31 Bob Chipman; 34 Mort Cooper; 17 Jess Dobernic; 26 Monk Dubiel; 17,18 Warren Hacker; 35 Ralph Hamner; 29 Emil Kush; 23 Doyle Lade; 20 Dutch Leonard; 12 Cal McLish; 11 Bob Muncrief; 17,30 Bob Rush; 53 Johnny Schmitz; 20 Lefty Sloat	Catchers: 4,8 Smoky Burgess; 9 Rube Novotney; 9,10 Mickey Owen; 10 Bob Scheffing; 8 Rube Walker; Infielders: 44 Phil Cavarretta; 6 Frankie Gustine; 22 Clarence Maddern; 33 Gene Mauch; 5 Bob Ramazzotti; 22 Herman Reich; 5 Hank Schenz; 6 Bill Serena; 39 Roy Smalley Jr.; 6 Wayne Terwilliger; 7 Emil Verban	Outfielders: 11 Cliff Aberson; 47 Frank Baumholtz; 16 Hank Edwards; 4,19 Hal Jeffcoat; 47 Peanuts Lowrey; 48 Andy Pafko; 43 Hank Sauer; 43 Harry Walker; Other batters: 36 Jim Kirby	Manager: 3 Frankie Frisch; 40 Charlie Grimm; Coaches: 42 Roy Johnson; 45 Merv Shea

== Player stats ==
=== Batting ===
==== Starters by position ====
Note: Pos = Position; G = Games played; AB = At bats; H = Hits; Avg. = Batting average; HR = Home runs; RBI = Runs batted in

Pos	Player	G	AB	H	Avg.	HR	RBI
C	Mickey Owen	62	198	54	.273	2	18
1B	Herman Reich	108	386	108	.280	3	34
2B	Emil Verban	98	343	99	.289	0	22
SS	Roy Smalley Jr.	135	477	117	.245	8	35
3B	Frankie Gustine	76	261	59	.226	4	27
OF	Hal Jeffcoat	108	363	89	.245	2	26
OF	Andy Pafko	144	519	146	.281	18	69
OF	Hank Sauer	96	357	104	.291	27	83

==== Other batters ====
Note: G = Games played; AB = At bats; H = Hits; Avg. = Batting average; HR = Home runs; RBI = Runs batted in

Player	G	AB	H	Avg.	HR	RBI
Phil Cavarretta	105	360	106	.294	8	49
Bob Ramazzotti	65	190	34	.179	0	6
Hank Edwards	58	176	51	.290	7	21
Rube Walker	56	172	42	.244	3	22
Frank Baumholtz	58	164	37	.226	1	15
Harry Walker	42	159	42	.264	1	14
Gene Mauch	72	150	37	.247	1	7
Bob Scheffing	55	149	40	.268	3	19
Wayne Terwilliger	36	112	25	.223	2	10
Peanuts Lowrey	38	111	30	.270	2	10
Rube Novotney	22	67	18	.269	0	6
Smokey Burgess	46	56	15	.268	1	12
Bill Serena	12	37	8	.216	1	7
Hank Schenz	7	14	6	.429	0	1
Clarence Maddern	10	9	3	.333	1	2
Cliff Aberson	4	7	0	.000	0	0
Jim Kirby	3	2	1	.500	0	0

=== Pitching ===
==== Starting pitchers ====
Note: G = Games pitched; IP = Innings pitched; W = Wins; L = Losses; ERA = Earned run average; SO = Strikeouts

Player	G	IP	W	L	ERA	SO
Johnny Schmitz	36	207.0	11	13	4.35	75
Bob Rush	35	201.0	10	18	4.07	80
Dutch Leonard	33	180.0	7	16	4.15	83

==== Other pitchers ====
Note: G = Games pitched; IP = Innings pitched; W = Wins; L = Losses; ERA = Earned run average; SO = Strikeouts

Player	G	IP	W	L	ERA	SO
Monk Dubiel	32	147.2	6	9	4.14	52
Doyle Lade	36	129.2	4	5	5.00	43
Warren Hacker	30	125.2	5	8	4.23	40
Bob Chipman	38	113.1	7	8	3.97	46
Dewey Adkins	30	82.1	2	4	5.68	43
Cal McLish	8	23.0	1	1	5.87	6
Ralph Hamner	6	12.1	0	2	8.76	3
Lefty Sloat	5	9.0	0	0	7.00	3

==== Relief pitchers ====
Note: G = Games pitched; W = Wins; L = Losses; SV = Saves; ERA = Earned run average; SO = Strikeouts

Player	G	W	L	SV	ERA	SO
Bob Muncrief	34	5	6	2	4.56	36
Emil Kush	26	3	3	2	3.78	22
Jess Dobernic	4	0	0	0	20.25	0
Mort Cooper	1	0	0	0	inf	0

== Farm system ==
Level	Team	League	Manager
AAA	Los Angeles Angels	Pacific Coast League	Bill Kelly
AA	Nashville Vols	Southern Association	Rollie Hemsley
A	Macon Peaches	Sally League	Don Osborn
A	Des Moines Bruins	Western League	Stan Hack
B	Decatur Cubs	Illinois–Indiana–Iowa League	Morrie Arnovich
B	Springfield Cubs	New England League	Bob Peterson
B	Selma Cloverleafs	Southeastern League	Leo Twardy and Joseph Szuch
C	Visalia Cubs	California League	Red Treadway, Jigger Statz and Claude Passeau
C	Clinton Steers	Central Association	Adolph Matulis and Joseph Blake
C	Sioux Falls Canaries	Northern League	Irvin Fortune and Lee Eilbracht
D	St. Augustine Saints	Florida State League	Frankie Piet
D	Carthage Cubs	Kansas–Oklahoma–Missouri League	Donald Anderson
D	Lumberton Cubs	Tobacco State League	Red Lucas and Jim Guinn
D	Rutherford County Owls	Western Carolina League	Sam Gibson and Halley Wilson
D	Janesville Cubs	Wisconsin State League	Jim Oglesby, Mike Frederick and Adolph Matulis

LEAGUE CHAMPIONS: Nashville, Macon, Rutherford County
