= 1949 Pittsburgh Pirates season =

1949 Pittsburgh Pirates
- League: National League
- Ballpark: Forbes Field
- City: Pittsburgh, Pennsylvania
- Owners: Frank E. McKinney, John W. Galbreath, Bing Crosby, Thomas P. Johnson
- General managers: Roy Hamey
- Managers: Billy Meyer
- Radio: WWSW; Rosey Rowswell, Bob Prince

The 1949 Pittsburgh Pirates season was the 68th season of the Pittsburgh Pirates franchise; the 63rd in the National League. The Pirates finished sixth in the league standings with a record of 71–83.

== Offseason ==
- Prior to 1949 season: Dick Smith was signed as an amateur free agent by the Pirates.

== Regular season ==
=== Season standings ===
National League
Team	W	L	Pct.	GB	Home	Road
Brooklyn Dodgers	97	57	.630	—	48‍–‍29	49‍–‍28
St. Louis Cardinals	96	58	.623	1	51‍–‍26	45‍–‍32
Philadelphia Phillies	81	73	.526	16	40‍–‍37	41‍–‍36
Boston Braves	75	79	.487	22	43‍–‍34	32‍–‍45
New York Giants	73	81	.474	24	43‍–‍34	30‍–‍47
Pittsburgh Pirates	71	83	.461	26	36‍–‍41	35‍–‍42
Cincinnati Reds	62	92	.403	35	35‍–‍42	27‍–‍50
Chicago Cubs	61	93	.396	36	33‍–‍44	28‍–‍49

=== Record vs. opponents ===
1949 National League record Sources:
Team	BSN	BRO	CHC	CIN	NYG	PHI	PIT	STL
Boston	—	10–12	12–10	12–10–1	12–10–2	11–11	12–10	6–16
Brooklyn	12–10	—	17–5	17–5	14–8	11–11	16–6	10–12–1
Chicago	10–12	5–17	—	9–13	12–10	6–16	11–11	8–14
Cincinnati	10–12–1	5–17	13–9	—	7–15	13–9	9–13	5–17–1
New York	10–12–2	8–14	10–12	15–7	—	11–11	12–10	7–15
Philadelphia	11–11	11–11	16–6	9–13	11–11	—	13–9	10–12
Pittsburgh	10–12	6–16	11–11	13–9	10–12	9–13	—	12–10
St. Louis	16–6	12–10–1	14–8	17–5–1	15–7	12–10	10–12	—

=== Game log ===
1949 Game Log: 71–83 (Home: 36–41; Away: 35–42)
April: 5–6 (Home: 3–1; Away: 2–5)

#	Date	Opponent	Score	Win	Loss	Save	Attendance	Record
1	April 19	@ Cubs	1–0	**Sewell** (1–0)	Leonard	—	29,392	1–0
2	April 20	@ Cubs	0–4	Rush	**Dickson** (0–1)	—	11,218	1–1
3	April 21	@ Cubs	3–4	Kush	**Muncrief** (0–1)	—	11,599	1–2
4	April 22	Reds	5–4	**Werle** (1–0)	Fox	**Casey** (1)	32,167	2–2
5	April 24	Reds	2–3 (10)	Gumbert	**Casey** (0–1)	—		2–3
6	April 24	Reds	3–1	**Chambers** (1–0)	Lively	—	24,444	3–3
7	April 25	Cubs	8–2	**Sewell** (2–0)	Rush	—	35,373	4–3
8	April 27	@ Cardinals	7–1	**Dickson** (1–1)	Pollet	—	11,727	5–3
9	April 28	@ Cardinals	2–4	Brazle	**Lombardi** (0–1)	—	4,561	5–4
10	April 29	@ Reds	3–7	Fox	**Werle** (1–1)	—	20,046	5–5
11	April 30	@ Reds	4–8	Wehmeier	**Riddle** (0–1)	Burkhart	4,416	5–6

May: 11–18 (Home: 5–8; Away: 6–10)

#	Date	Opponent	Score	Win	Loss	Save	Attendance	Record
12	May 1	@ Reds	10–4	**Chesnes** (1–0)	Howell	**Casey** (2)		6–6
13	May 1	@ Reds	2–5	Lively	**Chambers** (1–1)	—	24,872	6–7
14	May 3	@ Giants	3–5	Hartung	**Dickson** (1–2)	—	33,995	6–8
15	May 4	@ Giants	4–11	Jansen	**Muncrief** (0–2)	—	9,874	6–9
16	May 5	@ Giants	2–3 (10)	Behrman	**Dickson** (1–3)	—	8,422	6–10
17	May 6	@ Phillies	3–4	Meyer	**Riddle** (0–2)	—	15,754	6–11
18	May 7	@ Phillies	6–4	**Gregg** (1–0)	Rowe	—	6,832	7–11
19	May 8	@ Braves	8–3	**Chambers** (2–1)	Sain	**Muncrief** (1)		8–11
20	May 8	@ Braves	11–8	**Casey** (1–1)	Potter	**Riddle** (1)	27,211	9–11
21	May 9	@ Braves	1–4	Bickford	**Dickson** (1–4)	—	13,706	9–12
22	May 11	@ Dodgers	5–3	**Werle** (2–1)	Barney	—	22,709	10–12
23	May 12	@ Dodgers	6–11	Branca	**Gregg** (1–1)	—	7,455	10–13
24	May 13	Cardinals	3–2	**Casey** (2–1)	Munger	—	34,893	11–13
25	May 14	Cardinals	3–4	Pollet	**Dickson** (1–5)	Wilks	18,914	11–14
26	May 15	Cardinals	3–4	Staley	**Werle** (2–2)	Wilks	26,909	11–15
27	May 17	Giants	3–2	**Chesnes** (2–0)	Hartung	—	30,450	12–15
28	May 18	Giants	5–3	**Muncrief** (1–2)	Jansen	**Casey** (3)	14,240	13–15
29	May 19	Braves	2–3	Bickford	**Riddle** (0–3)	—	9,586	13–16
30	May 20	Braves	2–1	**Werle** (3–2)	Hall	—	29,807	14–16
31	May 21	Braves	2–8	Spahn	**Dickson** (1–6)	Hogue	16,724	14–17
32	May 22	Phillies	5–6	Roberts	**Riddle** (0–4)	Konstanty	31,467	14–18
33	May 24	Dodgers	1–6	Branca	**Chesnes** (2–1)	—	29,625	14–19
34	May 25	Dodgers	6–8	Banta	**Muncrief** (1–3)	—	13,988	14–20
35	May 26	@ Cardinals	6–13	Wilks	**Higbe** (0–1)	—	10,402	14–21
36	May 27	@ Cardinals	1–2	Brazle	**Dickson** (1–7)	—	12,110	14–22
37	May 28	@ Cardinals	2–4	Wilks	**Werle** (3–3)	—	15,931	14–23
38	May 29	@ Cardinals	4–2	**Riddle** (1–4)	Brecheen	**Muncrief** (2)	16,535	15–23
39	May 30	Cubs	5–8	Rush	**Higbe** (0–2)	—		15–24
40	May 30	Cubs	8–6	**Chesnes** (3–1)	McLish	**Muncrief** (3)	38,089	16–24

June: 11–15 (Home: 8–7; Away: 3–8)

#	Date	Opponent	Score	Win	Loss	Save	Attendance	Record
41	June 1	@ Braves	6–8	Hall	**Muncrief** (1–4)	Potter	20,153	16–25
42	June 2	@ Braves	1–4	Spahn	**Bonham** (0–1)	—	20,130	16–26
43	June 4	@ Dodgers	6–8	Banta	**Muncrief** (1–5)	—	18,352	16–27
44	June 5	@ Dodgers	5–4 (10)	**Dickson** (2–7)	Barney	—	25,035	17–27
45	June 6	@ Dodgers	1–5	Newcombe	**Chesnes** (3–2)	—	30,053	17–28
46	June 7	@ Phillies	5–6	Rowe	**Dickson** (2–8)	—	12,105	17–29
47	June 8	@ Phillies	0–2	Roberts	**Bonham** (0–2)	—	10,136	17–30
48	June 9	@ Phillies	3–4 (18)	Konstanty	**Dickson** (2–9)	—	4,095	17–31
49	June 10	@ Giants	6–1	**Werle** (4–3)	Jansen	—	6,942	18–31
50	June 11	@ Giants	3–4	Behrman	**Riddle** (1–5)	—	14,065	18–32
51	June 12	@ Giants	6–5	**Sewell** (3–0)	Hansen	**Casey** (4)	18,149	19–32
52	June 14	Braves	4–3	**Bonham** (1–2)	Potter	—	29,639	20–32
53	June 15	Braves	8–7	**Sewell** (4–0)	Hogue	—	15,048	21–32
54	June 16	Braves	2–7	Bickford	**Poat** (0–1)	—	12,239	21–33
55	June 17	Giants	6–4	**Bonham** (2–2)	Hartung	—	32,615	22–33
56	June 18	Giants	4–5	Jones	**Riddle** (1–6)	Koslo	17,752	22–34
57	June 19	Giants	9–4	**Chesnes** (4–2)	Jansen	—	25,413	23–34
58	June 20	Phillies	1–7	Meyer	**Werle** (4–4)	—	30,066	23–35
59	June 21	Phillies	4–9	Borowy	**Dickson** (2–10)	—	32,332	23–36
60	June 22	Phillies	12–3	**Lombardi** (1–1)	Roberts	—	8,957	24–36
61	June 23	Phillies	3–9	Simmons	**Riddle** (1–7)	—	10,283	24–37
62	June 24	Dodgers	4–2	**Bonham** (3–2)	Barney	—	34,670	25–37
63	June 25	Dodgers	10–17	Branca	**Chesnes** (4–3)	—	19,800	25–38
64	June 26	Dodgers	3–15	Newcombe	**Werle** (4–5)	—	39,548	25–39
65	June 29	Reds	7–3	**Lombardi** (2–1)	Erautt	—	9,003	26–39
66	June 30	Reds	2–1	**Chambers** (3–1)	Fox	—	8,283	27–39

July: 18–10 (Home: 6–5; Away: 12–5)

#	Date	Opponent	Score	Win	Loss	Save	Attendance	Record
67	July 1	@ Cubs	5–6	Muncrief	**Dickson** (2–11)	—	10,526	27–40
68	July 2	@ Cubs	8–3	**Bonham** (4–2)	Dubiel	**Sewell** (1)	16,670	28–40
69	July 3	@ Cubs	7–3	**Lombardi** (3–1)	Hacker	—	18,128	29–40
70	July 4	@ Reds	2–1	**Chambers** (4–1)	Fox	—		30–40
71	July 4	@ Reds	1–0	**Werle** (5–5)	Erautt	—	15,479	31–40
72	July 6	Cardinals	4–3	**Dickson** (3–11)	Munger	—	32,983	32–40
73	July 7	Cardinals	2–0	**Bonham** (5–2)	Staley	—	15,603	33–40
74	July 8	Cubs	2–1	**Lombardi** (4–1)	Leonard	—	36,336	34–40
75	July 9	Cubs	6–5 (13)	**Sewell** (5–0)	Kush	—	15,924	35–40
76	July 10	Cubs	6–8	Rush	**Chesnes** (4–4)	Dubiel		35–41
77	July 10	Cubs	6–9 (6)	Chipman	**Werle** (5–6)	Dubiel	26,317	35–42
78	July 14	@ Giants	3–4	Jansen	**Werle** (5–7)	—	22,677	35–43
79	July 16	@ Giants	9–0	**Chesnes** (5–4)	Hartung	—		36–43
80	July 16	@ Giants	7–6 (11)	**Werle** (6–7)	Hansen	**Casey** (5)	20,001	37–43
81	July 17	@ Phillies	2–1 (5)	**Chambers** (5–1)	Meyer	—	12,761	38–43
82	July 18	@ Phillies	7–2	**Dickson** (4–11)	Konstanty	—	4,068	39–43
83	July 19	@ Dodgers	3–4	Palica	**Sewell** (5–1)	—	16,387	39–44
84	July 20	@ Dodgers	8–6	**Chambers** (6–1)	Palica	—	12,381	40–44
85	July 21	@ Dodgers	6–7	Palica	**Werle** (6–8)	—	11,947	40–45
86	July 22	@ Braves	3–5	Bickford	**Dickson** (4–12)	Hogue	16,958	40–46
87	July 23	@ Braves	12–9	**Casey** (3–1)	Potter	**Chesnes** (1)	8,213	41–46
88	July 24	@ Braves	4–3	**Werle** (7–8)	Sain	—		42–46
89	July 24	@ Braves	7–6	**Casey** (4–1)	Voiselle	—	21,986	43–46
90	July 26	Giants	4–1	**Bonham** (6–2)	Hansen	—	35,041	44–46
91	July 27	Giants	3–8	Higbe	**Chesnes** (5–5)	—	19,768	44–47
92	July 28	Giants	6–8	Jones	**Gumbert** (0–1)	Higbe	12,653	44–48
93	July 31	Braves	1–9	Sain	**Chambers** (6–2)	—		44–49
94	July 31	Braves	6–5	**Gumbert** (1–1)	Potter	—	27,105	45–49

August: 12–19 (Home: 4–9; Away: 8–10)

#	Date	Opponent	Score	Win	Loss	Save	Attendance	Record
95	August 1	Dodgers	0–9	Branca	**Bonham** (6–3)	—	29,483	45–50
96	August 2	Dodgers	2–5	Barney	**Chesnes** (5–6)	—	27,697	45–51
97	August 3	Dodgers	5–10	Erskine	**Riddle** (1–8)	—	13,007	45–52
98	August 4	Dodgers	3–11	Newcombe	**Lombardi** (4–2)	—	14,363	45–53
99	August 5	Phillies	1–0	**Werle** (8–8)	Rowe	—	24,944	46–53
100	August 6	Phillies	3–4	Konstanty	**Gumbert** (1–2)	—	13,260	46–54
101	August 7	Phillies	3–7	Borowy	**Chambers** (6–3)	—		46–55
102	August 7	Phillies	4–5	Konstanty	**Chesnes** (5–7)	Roberts	27,928	46–56
103	August 9	@ Cubs	8–3	**Chambers** (7–3)	Schmitz	**Gumbert** (1)	11,313	47–56
104	August 10	@ Cubs	0–2	Lade	**Walsh** (0–1)	—	10,326	47–57
105	August 11	@ Cubs	3–2	**Werle** (9–8)	Dubiel	**Gumbert** (2)	5,415	48–57
106	August 12	@ Cardinals	2–8	Staley	**Bonham** (6–4)	—	22,231	48–58
107	August 13	@ Cardinals	6–3	**Dickson** (5–12)	Munger	—	25,745	49–58
108	August 14	@ Cardinals	4–0	**Chambers** (8–3)	Pollet	—	22,996	50–58
109	August 15	@ Reds	9–7	**Sewell** (6–1)	Wehmeier	**Gumbert** (3)	11,371	51–58
110	August 16	@ Reds	1–2 (10)	Fox	**Chesnes** (5–8)	—	2,526	51–59
111	August 18	Cubs	2–0	**Walsh** (1–1)	Lade	—	6,922	52–59
112	August 19	Cardinals	8–2	**Chambers** (9–3)	Staley	—	32,476	53–59
113	August 20	Cardinals	3–4	Pollet	**Gumbert** (1–3)	—	20,659	53–60
114	August 21	Cardinals	2–4	Martin	**Werle** (9–9)	—		53–61
115	August 21	Cardinals	8–0	**Dickson** (6–12)	Brecheen	—	34,408	54–61
116	August 23	@ Braves	2–5	Sain	**Chesnes** (5–9)	—	14,405	54–62
117	August 24	@ Braves	5–6	Spahn	**Chambers** (9–4)	—	6,467	54–63
118	August 25	@ Phillies	5–1	**Dickson** (7–12)	Meyer	—	4,548	55–63
119	August 25	@ Phillies	2–4	Roberts	**Walsh** (1–2)	—	7,179	55–64
120	August 26	@ Phillies	3–2	**Werle** (10–9)	Heintzelman	—	9,586	56–64
121	August 27	@ Phillies	8–2	**Bonham** (7–4)	Rowe	—	6,070	57–64
122	August 28	@ Dodgers	0–9	Newcombe	**Chesnes** (5–10)	—	23,663	57–65
123	August 29	@ Dodgers	1–5	Banta	**Chambers** (9–5)	—	24,031	57–66
124	August 30	@ Dodgers	3–4	Barney	**Dickson** (7–13)	—	13,708	57–67
125	August 31	@ Giants	5–12	Jones	**Werle** (10–10)	—	4,701	57–68

September: 13–14 (Home: 9–10; Away: 4–4)

#	Date	Opponent	Score	Win	Loss	Save	Attendance	Record
126	September 1	@ Giants	5–9	Hansen	**Lombardi** (4–3)	Higbe	3,973	57–69
127	September 3	@ Cubs	7–11	Adkins	**Chambers** (9–6)	Chipman	13,289	57–70
128	September 4	@ Cubs	7–11 (7)	Muncrief	**Chesnes** (5–11)	Rush	18,082	57–71
129	September 5	@ Cardinals	1–9	Munger	**Dickson** (7–14)	—		57–72
130	September 5	@ Cardinals	5–4 (10)	**Lombardi** (5–3)	Munger	—	32,214	58–72
131	September 6	Reds	3–6 (10)	Blackwell	**Walsh** (1–3)	—	11,797	58–73
132	September 7	Reds	2–5	Raffensberger	**Chambers** (9–7)	—	12,367	58–74
133	September 8	Reds	7–9	Wehmeier	**Lombardi** (5–4)	—	4,170	58–75
134	September 9	Cubs	1–8	Dubiel	**Chesnes** (5–12)	—	7,905	58–76
135	September 10	Cubs	5–9	Leonard	**Werle** (10–11)	Rush	5,369	58–77
136	September 11	Cubs	7–3	**Dickson** (8–14)	Adkins	—	9,851	59–77
137	September 13	Phillies	11–6	**Chambers** (10–7)	Borowy	—	11,878	60–77
138	September 14	Phillies	4–12	Roberts	**Walsh** (1–4)	—	3,920	60–78
139	September 16	Dodgers	9–2	**Werle** (11–11)	Newcombe	—	28,202	61–78
140	September 17	Dodgers	7–2	**Dickson** (9–14)	Palica	—	14,842	62–78
141	September 18	Giants	4–13	Jones	**Chesnes** (5–13)	—		62–79
142	September 18	Giants	7–2 (6)	**Chambers** (11–7)	Behrman	—	28,291	63–79
143	September 19	Giants	4–6 (10)	Jones	**Gumbert** (1–4)	—	11,542	63–80
144	September 20	Braves	2–4	Bickford	**Lombardi** (5–5)	—	11,348	63–81
145	September 21	Braves	7–9	Hall	**Werle** (11–12)	—	11,881	63–82
146	September 22	Braves	1–0	**Dickson** (10–14)	Sain	—	8,261	64–82
147	September 24	@ Reds	6–5	**Chambers** (12–7)	Raffensberger	—	2,019	65–82
148	September 25	@ Reds	7–3	**Chesnes** (6–13)	Wehmeier	—		66–82
149	September 25	@ Reds	5–3	**Dickson** (11–14)	Fox	—	9,086	67–82
150	September 27	Cardinals	6–4	**Werle** (12–12)	Munger	**Lombardi** (1)	27,283	68–82
151	September 29	Cardinals	7–2	**Dickson** (12–14)	Staley	—	9,573	69–82
152	September 30	Reds	3–2	**Chesnes** (7–13)	Wehmeier	—	9,416	70–82

October: 1–1 (Home: 1–1; Away: 0–0)

#	Date	Opponent	Score	Win	Loss	Save	Attendance	Record
153	October 2	Reds	4–2	**Chambers** (13–7)	Fox	—		71–82
154	October 2	Reds	5–6	Raffensberger	**Werle** (12–13)	—	40,025	71–83

Legend: = Win = Loss
Bold = Pirates team member

=== Notable transactions ===
- May 19, 1949: Ed Bahr and Grady Wilson were traded by the Pirates to the Brooklyn Dodgers for Nanny Fernandez.
- September 21, 1949: The Pirates traded a player to be named later and cash to the San Francisco Seals for Bill Werle. The Pirates completed the deal by sending Steve Nagy to the Seals on September 27.

=== Roster ===
1949 Pittsburgh Pirates
**Roster**
**Pitchers**: 10 Tiny Bonham; 25 Hugh Casey; 23 Cliff Chambers; 24 Bob Chesnes; 18,22 Murry Dickson; 37 Hal Gregg; 37 Harry Gumbert; 13 Kirby Higbe; 28 Vic Lombardi; 27 Bob Muncrief; 27,37 Ray Poat; 21 Elmer Riddle; 30 Rip Sewell; 29 Junior Walsh; 19,29 Bill Werle	**Catchers**: 9 Ed Fitz Gerald; 17 Phil Masi; 8 Clyde McCullough; **Infielders**: 10 Monty Basgall; 3 Eddie Bockman; 16 Pete Castiglione; 2 Les Fleming; 12 Johnny Hopp; 7 Danny Murtaugh; 5 Jack Phillips; 17 Bobby Rhawn; 6 Stan Rojek; 5 Ed Stevens	**Outfielders**: 17 Ted Beard; 14 Wally Judnich; 4 Ralph Kiner; 17 Marv Rackley; 14 Dino Restelli; 18 Tom Saffell; 11 Dixie Walker; 15 Wally Westlake; **Other batters**: 19 Jack Cassini	**Manager**: 1 Billy Meyer; **Coaches**: 31 Goldie Holt; 32 Bill Posedel; 34 Johnny Riddle; 33 Honus Wagner

== Player stats ==
= Indicates league leader

=== Batting ===
==== Starters by position ====
Note: Pos = Position; G = Games played; AB = At bats; H = Hits; Avg. = Batting average; HR = Home runs; RBI = Runs batted in

Pos	Player	G	AB	H	Avg.	HR	RBI
C	Clyde McCullough	91	241	57	.237	4	21
1B	Johnny Hopp	105	371	118	.318	5	39
2B	Monty Basgall	107	308	67	.218	2	26
SS	Stan Rojek	144	557	136	.244	0	31
3B	Pete Castiglione	118	448	120	.268	6	43
OF	Dino Restelli	72	232	58	.250	12	40
OF	Ralph Kiner	152	549	170	.310	54	127
OF	Wally Westlake	147	525	148	.282	23	104

==== Other batters ====
Note: G = Games played; AB = At bats; H = Hits; Avg. = Batting average; HR = Home runs; RBI = Runs batted in

Player	G	AB	H	Avg.	HR	RBI
Danny Murtaugh	75	236	48	.203	2	24
Ed Stevens	67	221	58	.262	4	32
Eddie Bockman	79	220	49	.223	6	19
Tom Saffell	73	205	66	.322	2	25
Dixie Walker	88	181	51	.282	1	18
Ed Fitz Gerald	75	160	42	.263	2	18
Phil Masi	48	135	37	.274	2	13
Jack Phillips	18	56	13	.232	0	3
Marv Rackley	11	35	11	.314	0	2
Wally Judnich	10	35	8	.229	0	1
Les Fleming	24	31	8	.258	0	7
Ted Beard	14	24	2	.083	0	1
Bobby Rhawn	3	7	1	.143	0	0
Jack Cassini	8	0	0	----	0	0

=== Pitching ===
==== Starting pitchers ====
Note: G = Games pitched; IP = Innings pitched; W = Wins; L = Losses; ERA = Earned run average; SO = Strikeouts

Player	G	IP	W	L	ERA	SO
Bill Werle	35	221.0	12	13	4.24	106
Bob Chesnes	27	145.1	7	13	5.88	49
Tiny Bonham	18	89.0	7	4	4.25	25
Elmer Riddle	16	74.1	1	8	5.33	24
Junior Walsh	9	42.2	1	4	5.06	24

==== Other pitchers ====
Note: G = Games pitched; IP = Innings pitched; W = Wins; L = Losses; ERA = Earned run average; SO = Strikeouts

Player	G	IP	W	L	ERA	SO
Murry Dickson	44	224.1	12	14	3.29	89
Cliff Chambers	34	177.1	13	7	3.96	93
Vic Lombardi	34	134.0	5	5	4.57	64
Rip Sewell	28	76.0	6	1	3.97	26
Ray Poat	11	36.0	0	1	6.25	17
Bob Muncrief	13	35.2	1	5	6.31	11
Hal Gregg	8	18.2	1	1	3.38	9
Kirby Higbe	7	15.1	0	2	13.50	5

==== Relief pitchers ====
Note: G = Games pitched; W = Wins; L = Losses; SV = Saves; ERA = Earned run average; SO = Strikeouts

Player	G	W	L	SV	ERA	SO
Hugh Casey	33	4	1	5	4.66	9
Harry Gumbert	16	1	4	3	5.86	5

== Farm system ==
Level	Team	League	Manager
AAA	Indianapolis Indians	American Association	Al López
AA	New Orleans Pelicans	Southern Association	Hugh Luby
A	Albany Senators	Eastern League	Pinky May
B	Waco Pirates	Big State League	Buddy Hancken
B	Davenport Pirates	Illinois–Indiana–Iowa League	Bill Burwell
B	York White Roses	Interstate League	Frank Oceak
C	Modesto Reds	California League	Bill Jackson and Max Macon
C	Keokuk Pirates	Central Association	Charlie Hargreaves
C	Uniontown Coal Barons	Middle Atlantic League	Wes Griffin
D	Greenville Pirates	Alabama State League	Walt Tauscher
D	Tallahassee Pirates	Georgia–Florida League	Norman Veazey, Bob Shawkey, Johnnie Heving and Gene Cabaniss
D	Bartlesville Pirates	Kansas–Oklahoma–Missouri League	Tedd Gullic
D	Salisbury Pirates	North Carolina State League	John Corriden and Mickey O'Neil

LEAGUE CHAMPIONS: Indianapolis, Waco
