= 1949 Cincinnati Reds season =

1949 Cincinnati Reds
- League: National League
- Ballpark: Crosley Field
- City: Cincinnati
- Owners: Powel Crosley Jr.
- General managers: Warren Giles
- Managers: Bucky Walters, Luke Sewell
- Television: WLWT/WCPO-TV (Waite Hoyt)
- Radio: WCPO (Waite Hoyt)

The 1949 Cincinnati Reds season was a season in American baseball. The team finished seventh in the National League with a record of 62–92, 35 games behind the Brooklyn Dodgers.

== Regular season ==
=== Season standings ===
National League
| Team | W | L | Pct. | GB | Home | Road |
|---|---|---|---|---|---|---|
| Brooklyn Dodgers | 97 | 57 | .630 | — | 48‍–‍29 | 49‍–‍28 |
| St. Louis Cardinals | 96 | 58 | .623 | 1 | 51‍–‍26 | 45‍–‍32 |
| Philadelphia Phillies | 81 | 73 | .526 | 16 | 40‍–‍37 | 41‍–‍36 |
| Boston Braves | 75 | 79 | .487 | 22 | 43‍–‍34 | 32‍–‍45 |
| New York Giants | 73 | 81 | .474 | 24 | 43‍–‍34 | 30‍–‍47 |
| Pittsburgh Pirates | 71 | 83 | .461 | 26 | 36‍–‍41 | 35‍–‍42 |
| Cincinnati Reds | 62 | 92 | .403 | 35 | 35‍–‍42 | 27‍–‍50 |
| Chicago Cubs | 61 | 93 | .396 | 36 | 33‍–‍44 | 28‍–‍49 |

=== Record vs. opponents ===
1949 National League record Sources:
| Team | BSN | BRO | CHC | CIN | NYG | PHI | PIT | STL |
|---|---|---|---|---|---|---|---|---|
| Boston | — | 10–12 | 12–10 | 12–10–1 | 12–10–2 | 11–11 | 12–10 | 6–16 |
| Brooklyn | 12–10 | — | 17–5 | 17–5 | 14–8 | 11–11 | 16–6 | 10–12–1 |
| Chicago | 10–12 | 5–17 | — | 9–13 | 12–10 | 6–16 | 11–11 | 8–14 |
| Cincinnati | 10–12–1 | 5–17 | 13–9 | — | 7–15 | 13–9 | 9–13 | 5–17–1 |
| New York | 10–12–2 | 8–14 | 10–12 | 15–7 | — | 11–11 | 12–10 | 7–15 |
| Philadelphia | 11–11 | 11–11 | 16–6 | 9–13 | 11–11 | — | 13–9 | 10–12 |
| Pittsburgh | 10–12 | 6–16 | 11–11 | 13–9 | 10–12 | 9–13 | — | 12–10 |
| St. Louis | 16–6 | 12–10–1 | 14–8 | 17–5–1 | 15–7 | 12–10 | 10–12 | — |

=== Notable transactions ===
- June 15, 1949: Frank Baumholtz and Hank Sauer were traded by the Reds to the Chicago Cubs for Peanuts Lowrey and Harry Walker.

=== Roster ===
1949 Cincinnati Reds
Roster
| Pitchers: 47 Ewell Blackwell; 48 Ken Burkhart; 32 Walker Cress; 17,39 Jess Dobernic; 33,34 Eddie Erautt; 40 Frank Fanovich; 43 Howie Fox; 41 Harry Gumbert; 39 Dixie Howell; 37 Buddy Lively; 35 Harry Perkowski; 30 Kent Peterson; 36 Ken Raffensberger; 32,33 Johnny Vander Meer; 31 Herm Wehmeier | Catchers: 7 Walker Cooper; 6 Dixie Howell; 7 Ray Mueller; 8 Johnny Pramesa; Infielders: 12 Bobby Adams; 11 Jimmy Bloodworth; 14 Claude Corbitt; 15 Grady Hatton; 18 Ted Kluszewski; 17 Chuck Kress; 14 Sammy Meeks; 10 Virgil Stallcup | Outfielders: 21 Frank Baumholtz; 28 Danny Litwhiler; 21 Peanuts Lowrey; 20 Lloyd Merriman; 29 Wally Post; 29 Hank Sauer; 29 Harry Walker; 22 Johnny Wyrostek | Manager: 2 Luke Sewell; 1 Bucky Walters; Coaches: 3 Tony Cuccinello; 4 Phil Page; 2 Luke Sewell |

== Player stats ==
=== Batting ===
==== Starters by position ====
Note: Pos = Position; G = Games played; AB = At bats; H = Hits; Avg. = Batting average; HR = Home runs; RBI = Runs batted in

| Pos | Player | G | AB | H | Avg. | HR | RBI |
|---|---|---|---|---|---|---|---|
| C | Walker Cooper | 82 | 307 | 86 | .280 | 16 | 62 |
| 1B | Ted Kluszewski | 136 | 531 | 164 | .309 | 8 | 68 |
| 2B | Jimmy Bloodworth | 134 | 452 | 118 | .261 | 9 | 59 |
| SS | Virgil Stallcup | 141 | 575 | 146 | .254 | 3 | 45 |
| 3B | Grady Hatton | 137 | 537 | 141 | .263 | 11 | 69 |
| OF | Harry Walker | 86 | 314 | 100 | .318 | 1 | 23 |
| OF | Peanuts Lowrey | 89 | 309 | 85 | .275 | 2 | 25 |
| OF | Johnny Wyrostek | 134 | 474 | 118 | .249 | 9 | 46 |

==== Other batters ====
Note: G = Games played; AB = At bats; H = Hits; Avg. = Batting average; HR = Home runs; RBI = Runs batted in

| Player | G | AB | H | Avg. | HR | RBI |
|---|---|---|---|---|---|---|
| Danny Litwhiler | 102 | 292 | 85 | .291 | 11 | 48 |
| Lloyd Merriman | 103 | 287 | 66 | .230 | 4 | 26 |
| Bobby Adams | 107 | 277 | 70 | .253 | 0 | 25 |
| Dixie Howell | 64 | 172 | 42 | .244 | 2 | 18 |
| Hank Sauer | 42 | 152 | 36 | .237 | 4 | 16 |
| Ray Mueller | 32 | 106 | 29 | .274 | 1 | 13 |
| Claude Corbitt | 44 | 94 | 17 | .181 | 0 | 3 |
| Frank Baumholtz | 27 | 81 | 19 | .235 | 1 | 8 |
| Sammy Meeks | 16 | 36 | 11 | .306 | 2 | 6 |
| Chuck Kress | 27 | 29 | 6 | .207 | 0 | 3 |
| Johnny Pramesa | 17 | 25 | 6 | .240 | 1 | 2 |
| Wally Post | 6 | 8 | 2 | .250 | 0 | 1 |

=== Pitching ===
==== Starting pitchers ====
Note: G = Games pitched; IP = Innings pitched; W = Wins; L = Losses; ERA = Earned run average; SO = Strikeouts

| Player | G | IP | W | L | ERA | SO |
|---|---|---|---|---|---|---|
| Ken Raffensberger | 41 | 284.0 | 18 | 17 | 3.39 | 103 |
| Howie Fox | 38 | 215.0 | 6 | 19 | 3.98 | 60 |
| Herm Wehmeier | 33 | 213.1 | 11 | 12 | 4.68 | 80 |
| Johnny Vander Meer | 28 | 159.2 | 5 | 10 | 4.90 | 76 |

==== Other pitchers ====
Note: G = Games pitched; IP = Innings pitched; W = Wins; L = Losses; ERA = Earned run average; SO = Strikeouts

| Player | G | IP | W | L | ERA | SO |
|---|---|---|---|---|---|---|
| Eddie Erautt | 39 | 112.2 | 4 | 11 | 3.36 | 43 |
| Buddy Lively | 31 | 103.1 | 4 | 6 | 3.92 | 30 |
| Kent Peterson | 30 | 66.1 | 4 | 5 | 6.24 | 28 |
| Harry Perkowski | 5 | 23.2 | 1 | 1 | 4.56 | 3 |
| Dixie Howell | 5 | 13.1 | 0 | 1 | 8.10 | 7 |

==== Relief pitchers ====
Note: G = Games pitched; W = Wins; L = Losses; SV = Saves; ERA = Earned run average; SO = Strikeouts

| Player | G | W | L | SV | ERA | SO |
|---|---|---|---|---|---|---|
| Ewell Blackwell | 30 | 5 | 5 | 1 | 4.23 | 55 |
| Frank Fanovich | 29 | 0 | 2 | 0 | 5.40 | 27 |
| Harry Gumbert | 29 | 4 | 3 | 2 | 5.53 | 12 |
| Jess Dobernic | 14 | 0 | 0 | 0 | 9.78 | 6 |
| Ken Burkhart | 11 | 0 | 0 | 1 | 3.18 | 8 |
| Walker Cress | 3 | 0 | 0 | 0 | 0.00 | 0 |

== Farm system ==
| Level | Team | League | Manager |
|---|---|---|---|
| AAA | Syracuse Chiefs | International League | Jewel Ens |
| AA | Tulsa Oilers | Texas League | Al Vincent |
| A | Charleston Senators | Central League | Joe Beggs |
| A | Columbia Reds | Sally League | Gee Walker |
| B | Sunbury Reds | Interstate League | Joe Buzas |
| C | Rockford Rox | Central Association | Bob Dill and Fred Lietz |
| C | Tyler Trojans | East Texas League | Carl McNabb and Mel Hicks |
| C | Ogden Reds | Pioneer League | Herm Schulte |
| D | Muncie Reds | Ohio–Indiana League | Mike Blazo |
| D | Lockport Reds | PONY League | Cecil Scheffel |

LEAGUE CHAMPIONS: Tulsa
