= 1949 St. Louis Cardinals season =

Major League Baseball season

1949 St. Louis Cardinals
- League: National League
- Ballpark: Sportsman's Park
- City: St. Louis, Missouri
- Record: 96–58 (.612)
- League place: 2nd
- Owners: Fred Saigh
- General managers: William Walsingham Jr.
- Managers: Eddie Dyer
- Television: KSD (Harry Caray, Gabby Street)
- Radio: WIL (Harry Caray, Gabby Street)
- Stats: ESPN.com; Baseball Reference

The 1949 St. Louis Cardinals season was the team's 68th season in St. Louis, Missouri, and its 58th season in the National League (NL). The Cardinals went 96–58 during the season and finished second, one game back in the National League. The team set an NL record for fewest stolen bases in a season, 17, which still stands.

== Offseason ==
- November 24, 1948: Ray Jablonski was drafted by the Cardinals from the Boston Red Sox in the 1948 minor league draft.
- Prior to 1949 season (exact date unknown)
  - Dick Rand was signed as an amateur free agent by the Cardinals.
  - Neal Hertweck was signed as an amateur free agent by the Cardinals.

== Regular season ==
=== Season standings ===
National League
Team	W	L	Pct.	GB	Home	Road
Brooklyn Dodgers	97	57	.630	—	48‍–‍29	49‍–‍28
St. Louis Cardinals	96	58	.623	1	51‍–‍26	45‍–‍32
Philadelphia Phillies	81	73	.526	16	40‍–‍37	41‍–‍36
Boston Braves	75	79	.487	22	43‍–‍34	32‍–‍45
New York Giants	73	81	.474	24	43‍–‍34	30‍–‍47
Pittsburgh Pirates	71	83	.461	26	36‍–‍41	35‍–‍42
Cincinnati Reds	62	92	.403	35	35‍–‍42	27‍–‍50
Chicago Cubs	61	93	.396	36	33‍–‍44	28‍–‍49

=== Record vs. opponents ===
1949 National League record Sources:
Team	BSN	BRO	CHC	CIN	NYG	PHI	PIT	STL
Boston	—	10–12	12–10	12–10–1	12–10–2	11–11	12–10	6–16
Brooklyn	12–10	—	17–5	17–5	14–8	11–11	16–6	10–12–1
Chicago	10–12	5–17	—	9–13	12–10	6–16	11–11	8–14
Cincinnati	10–12–1	5–17	13–9	—	7–15	13–9	9–13	5–17–1
New York	10–12–2	8–14	10–12	15–7	—	11–11	12–10	7–15
Philadelphia	11–11	11–11	16–6	9–13	11–11	—	13–9	10–12
Pittsburgh	10–12	6–16	11–11	13–9	10–12	9–13	—	12–10
St. Louis	16–6	12–10–1	14–8	17–5–1	15–7	12–10	10–12	—

=== Roster ===
1949 St. Louis Cardinals
Roster
Pitchers: 24 Cloyd Boyer; 27 Al Brazle; 31 Harry Brecheen; 34 Jim Hearn; 35 Ken Johnson; 24 Kurt Krieger; 40,23 Max Lanier; 41,39 Fred Martin; 20 Red Munger; 11 Howie Pollet; 33 Bill Reeder; 14 Jerry Staley; 28 Ted Wilks; 39 Ray Yochim	Catchers: 15 Bill Baker; 17 Joe Garagiola; 18 Del Rice; 10 Del Wilber; Infielders: 5 Steve Bilko; 12 Tommy Glaviano; 22 Solly Hemus; 3 Nippy Jones; 21 Eddie Kazak; 29 Lou Klein; 1 Whitey Kurowski; 4 Marty Marion; 19 Rocky Nelson; 2 Red Schoendienst	Outfielders: 32 Chuck Diering; 36 Bill Howerton; 6 Stan Musial; 5 Ron Northey; 16 Hal Rice; 10 Ed Sauer; 9 Enos Slaughter; Other batters: 41 Russ Derry; 7 Erv Dusak	Manager: 30 Eddie Dyer; Coaches: 25 Tony Kaufmann; 8 Terry Moore; 26 Buzzy Wares

== Player stats ==
=== Batting ===
==== Starters by position ====
Note: Pos = Position; G = Games played; AB = At bats; H = Hits; Avg. = Batting average; HR = Home runs; RBI = Runs batted in

Pos	Player	G	AB	H	Avg.	HR	RBI
C	Del Rice	92	284	67	.236	4	29
1B	Nippy Jones	110	380	114	.300	8	62
2B	Red Schoendienst	151	640	190	.297	3	54
SS	Marty Marion	134	515	140	.272	5	70
3B	Eddie Kazak	92	326	99	.304	6	42
OF	Stan Musial	157	612	207	.338	36	123
OF	Chuck Diering	131	369	97	.263	3	38
OF	Enos Slaughter	151	568	191	.336	13	96

==== Other batters ====
Note: G = Games played; AB = At bats; H = Hits; Avg. = Batting average; HR = Home runs; RBI = Runs batted in

Player	G	AB	H	Avg.	HR	RBI
Ron Northey	90	265	69	.260	7	50
Tommy Glaviano	87	258	69	.267	6	36
Rocky Nelson	82	244	54	.221	4	32
Joe Garagiola	81	241	63	.261	3	26
Lou Klein	58	114	25	.219	2	12
Hal Rice	40	46	9	.196	1	9
Ed Sauer	24	45	10	.222	0	1
Solly Hemus	20	33	11	.333	0	2
Bill Baker	20	30	4	.133	0	4
Steve Bilko	6	17	5	.294	0	2
Whitey Kurowski	10	14	2	.143	0	0
Bill Howerton	9	13	4	.308	0	1
Del Wilber	2	4	1	.250	0	0
Russ Derry	2	2	0	.000	0	0
Erv Dusak	1	0	0	----	0	0

=== Pitching ===
==== Starting pitchers ====
Note: G = Games pitched; IP = Innings pitched; W = Wins; L = Losses; ERA = Earned run average; SO = Strikeouts

Player	G	IP	W	L	ERA	SO
Howie Pollet	39	230.2	20	9	2.77	108
Harry Brecheen	32	214.2	13	11	3.35	88
Red Munger	35	188.1	15	8	3.87	82
Max Lanier	15	92.0	5	4	3.82	37

==== Other pitchers ====
Note: G = Games pitched; IP = Innings pitched; W = Wins; L = Losses; ERA = Earned run average; SO = Strikeouts

Player	G	IP	W	L	ERA	SO
Al Brazle	39	206.1	14	8	3.18	75
Gerry Staley	45	171.1	10	10	2.73	55
Fred Martin	21	70.0	6	0	2.44	30
Jim Hearn	17	42.0	1	3	5.14	18
Cloyd Boyer	4	3.1	0	0	10.80	0

==== Relief pitchers ====
Note: G = Games pitched; W = Wins; L = Losses; SV = Saves; ERA = Earned run average; SO = Strikeouts

Player	G	W	L	SV	ERA	SO
Ted Wilks	59	10	3	9	3.73	71
Bill Reeder	21	1	1	0	5.08	21
Ken Johnson	14	0	1	0	6.42	18
Ray Yochim	3	0	0	0	15.43	3
Kurt Krieger	1	0	0	0	0.00	0

== Farm system ==
Level	Team	League	Manager
AAA	Columbus Red Birds	American Association	Hal Anderson
AAA	Rochester Red Wings	International League	Johnny Keane
AA	Houston Buffaloes	Texas League	Del Wilber
A	Columbus Cardinals	Sally League	Kemp Wicker
A	Omaha Cardinals	Western League	Cedric Durst
B	Winston-Salem Cardinals	Carolina League	Willie Duke, George Ferrell and Roland LeBlanc
B	Allentown Cardinals	Interstate League	Al Hollingsworth
B	Lynchburg Cardinals	Piedmont League	Pug Griffin and Vernon Mackie
C	Fresno Cardinals	California League	Frenchy Uhalt
C	Duluth Dukes	Northern League	Ed Madjeski and Russ Rolandson
C	Pocatello Cardinals	Pioneer League	Walter Lowe
C	St. Joseph Cardinals	Western Association	Harold Olt
D	Johnson City Cardinals	Appalachian League	Ben Catchings
D	Salisbury Cardinals	Eastern Shore League	Gene Corbett
D	Willows Cardinals	Far West League	Bert Bonomi and Fred Fass
D	Tallassee Cardinals	Georgia–Alabama League	Bob Comiskey and Bill Blackwell
D	Albany Cardinals	Georgia–Florida League	Sheldon "Chief" Bender
D	West Frankfort Cardinals	Mississippi–Ohio Valley League	Bob Stanton
D	Lebanon Chicks	North Atlantic League	Harold Contini
D	Hamilton Cardinals	PONY League	George Kissell

LEAGUE CHAMPIONS: Lynchburg, Pocatello
