= 1949 New York Giants (MLB) season =

1949 New York Giants
- League: National League
- Ballpark: Polo Grounds
- City: New York City
- Record: 73–81 (.474)
- League place: 5th
- Owners: Horace Stoneham
- General managers: Chub Feeney
- Managers: Leo Durocher
- Television: WPIX (Russ Hodges, Al Helfer)
- Radio: WMCA (Russ Hodges, Al Helfer)

The 1949 New York Giants season was the franchise's 67th season. The team finished in fifth place in the National League with a 73–81 record, 24 games behind the Brooklyn Dodgers. The games were now broadcast on the then new station WPIX-TV, which was launched the year before.

== Offseason ==
- Prior to 1949 season (exact date unknown)
  - Art Fowler was acquired from the Giants by the Atlanta Crackers.
  - Foster Castleman was signed as an amateur free agent by the Giants.

== Regular season ==
=== Season standings ===
National League
| Team | W | L | Pct. | GB | Home | Road |
|---|---|---|---|---|---|---|
| Brooklyn Dodgers | 97 | 57 | .630 | — | 48‍–‍29 | 49‍–‍28 |
| St. Louis Cardinals | 96 | 58 | .623 | 1 | 51‍–‍26 | 45‍–‍32 |
| Philadelphia Phillies | 81 | 73 | .526 | 16 | 40‍–‍37 | 41‍–‍36 |
| Boston Braves | 75 | 79 | .487 | 22 | 43‍–‍34 | 32‍–‍45 |
| New York Giants | 73 | 81 | .474 | 24 | 43‍–‍34 | 30‍–‍47 |
| Pittsburgh Pirates | 71 | 83 | .461 | 26 | 36‍–‍41 | 35‍–‍42 |
| Cincinnati Reds | 62 | 92 | .403 | 35 | 35‍–‍42 | 27‍–‍50 |
| Chicago Cubs | 61 | 93 | .396 | 36 | 33‍–‍44 | 28‍–‍49 |

=== Record vs. opponents ===
1949 National League record Sources:
| Team | BSN | BRO | CHC | CIN | NYG | PHI | PIT | STL |
|---|---|---|---|---|---|---|---|---|
| Boston | — | 10–12 | 12–10 | 12–10–1 | 12–10–2 | 11–11 | 12–10 | 6–16 |
| Brooklyn | 12–10 | — | 17–5 | 17–5 | 14–8 | 11–11 | 16–6 | 10–12–1 |
| Chicago | 10–12 | 5–17 | — | 9–13 | 12–10 | 6–16 | 11–11 | 8–14 |
| Cincinnati | 10–12–1 | 5–17 | 13–9 | — | 7–15 | 13–9 | 9–13 | 5–17–1 |
| New York | 10–12–2 | 8–14 | 10–12 | 15–7 | — | 11–11 | 12–10 | 7–15 |
| Philadelphia | 11–11 | 11–11 | 16–6 | 9–13 | 11–11 | — | 13–9 | 10–12 |
| Pittsburgh | 10–12 | 6–16 | 11–11 | 13–9 | 10–12 | 9–13 | — | 12–10 |
| St. Louis | 16–6 | 12–10–1 | 14–8 | 17–5–1 | 15–7 | 12–10 | 10–12 | — |

=== Roster ===
1949 New York Giants
Roster
| Pitchers: 21 Hank Behrman; 17 Roger Bowman; 44 Andy Hansen; 36 Clint Hartung; 16,30 Kirby Higbe; 46 Larry Jansen; 37 Sheldon Jones; 32 Monte Kennedy; 31 Dave Koslo; 30 Ray Poat; 48 Andy Tomasic; 38 Red Webb; 29,47 Adrián Zabala | Catchers: 7 Walker Cooper; 3 Herman Franks; 8 Mickey Livingston; 8 Ray Mueller; 9 Wes Westrum; 39 Sal Yvars; Infielders: 47 Dick Culler; 29 Augie Galan; 20 Sid Gordon; 39 Bert Haas; 12 George Hausmann; 26 Bobby Hofman; 10 Buddy Kerr; 24 Joe Lafata; 17 Jack Lohrke; 15 Johnny Mize; 12 Bobby Rhawn; 18 Bill Rigney; 28 Rudy Rufer; 16 Hank Thompson; -- Davey Williams | Outfielders: 7 Monte Irvin; 25 Whitey Lockman; 27 Willard Marshall; 9,16 Pete Milne; 22 Don Mueller; 23 Bobby Thomson | Manager: 2 Leo Durocher; Coaches: 6 Fred Fitzsimmons; 3 Herman Franks; 1 Frankie Frisch; 5 Red Kress |

== Player stats ==
=== Batting ===
==== Starters by position ====
Note: Pos = Position; G = Games played; AB = At bats; H = Hits; Avg. = Batting average; HR = Home runs; RBI = Runs batted in

| Pos | Player | G | AB | H | Avg. | HR | RBI |
|---|---|---|---|---|---|---|---|
| C | Wes Westrum | 64 | 169 | 41 | .243 | 7 | 28 |
| 1B | Johnny Mize | 106 | 388 | 102 | .263 | 18 | 62 |
| 2B | Hank Thompson | 75 | 275 | 77 | .280 | 9 | 34 |
| SS | Buddy Kerr | 90 | 220 | 46 | .209 | 0 | 19 |
| 3B | Sid Gordon | 141 | 489 | 139 | .284 | 26 | 90 |
| OF | Willard Marshall | 141 | 499 | 153 | .307 | 12 | 70 |
| OF | Whitey Lockman | 151 | 617 | 186 | .301 | 11 | 65 |
| OF | Bobby Thomson | 156 | 641 | 198 | .309 | 27 | 109 |

==== Other batters ====
Note: G = Games played; AB = At bats; H = Hits; Avg. = Batting average; HR = Home runs; RBI = Runs batted in

| Player | G | AB | H | Avg. | HR | RBI |
|---|---|---|---|---|---|---|
| Bill Rigney | 122 | 389 | 108 | .278 | 6 | 47 |
| Jack Lohrke | 55 | 180 | 48 | .267 | 5 | 22 |
| Ray Mueller | 56 | 170 | 38 | .224 | 5 | 23 |
| Walker Cooper | 42 | 147 | 31 | .211 | 4 | 21 |
| Joe Lafata | 64 | 140 | 33 | .236 | 3 | 16 |
| Bert Haas | 54 | 104 | 27 | .260 | 1 | 10 |
| Monte Irvin | 36 | 76 | 17 | .224 | 0 | 7 |
| Mickey Livingston | 19 | 57 | 17 | .298 | 4 | 12 |
| Don Mueller | 51 | 56 | 13 | .232 | 0 | 1 |
| Davey Williams | 13 | 50 | 12 | .240 | 1 | 5 |
| Bobby Hofman | 19 | 48 | 10 | .208 | 0 | 3 |
| George Hausmann | 16 | 47 | 6 | .128 | 0 | 3 |
| Bobby Rhawn | 14 | 29 | 5 | .172 | 0 | 2 |
| Pete Milne | 31 | 29 | 7 | .241 | 1 | 6 |
| Augie Galan | 22 | 17 | 1 | .059 | 0 | 2 |
| Rudy Rufer | 7 | 15 | 1 | .067 | 0 | 2 |
| Sal Yvars | 3 | 8 | 0 | .000 | 0 | 0 |
| Herman Franks | 1 | 3 | 2 | .667 | 0 | 0 |
| Dick Culler | 7 | 1 | 0 | .000 | 0 | 0 |

=== Pitching ===
==== Starting pitchers ====
Note: G = Games pitched; IP = Innings pitched; W = Wins; L = Losses; ERA = Earned run average; SO = Strikeouts

| Player | G | IP | W | L | ERA | SO |
|---|---|---|---|---|---|---|
| Larry Jansen | 37 | 259.2 | 15 | 16 | 3.85 | 113 |
| Monty Kennedy | 38 | 223.1 | 12 | 14 | 3.43 | 95 |
| Clint Hartung | 33 | 154.2 | 9 | 11 | 5.00 | 48 |
| Roger Bowman | 2 | 6.1 | 0 | 0 | 4.26 | 4 |

==== Other pitchers ====
Note: G = Games pitched; IP = Innings pitched; W = Wins; L = Losses; ERA = Earned run average; SO = Strikeouts

| Player | G | IP | W | L | ERA | SO |
|---|---|---|---|---|---|---|
| Dave Koslo | 38 | 212.0 | 11 | 14 | 2.50 | 64 |
| Sheldon Jones | 42 | 207.1 | 15 | 12 | 3.34 | 79 |
| Adrián Zabala | 15 | 41.0 | 2 | 3 | 5.27 | 13 |

==== Relief pitchers ====
Note: G = Games pitched; W = Wins; L = Losses; SV = Saves; ERA = Earned run average; SO = Strikeouts

| Player | G | W | L | SV | ERA | SO |
|---|---|---|---|---|---|---|
| Hank Behrman | 43 | 3 | 3 | 0 | 4.92 | 25 |
| Kirby Higbe | 37 | 2 | 0 | 2 | 3.47 | 38 |
| Andy Hansen | 33 | 2 | 6 | 1 | 4.61 | 26 |
| Red Webb | 20 | 1 | 1 | 0 | 4.03 | 9 |
| Andy Tomasic | 2 | 0 | 1 | 0 | 18.00 | 2 |
| Ray Poat | 2 | 0 | 0 | 0 | 19.29 | 0 |

== Farm system ==
| Level | Team | League | Manager |
|---|---|---|---|
| AAA | Minneapolis Millers | American Association | Tommy Heath |
| AAA | Jersey City Giants | International League | Joe Becker |
| A | Jacksonville Tars | Sally League | Jack Aragón |
| A | Sioux City Soos | Western League | Donald Ramsay |
| B | Trenton Giants | Interstate League | Hugh Poland |
| B | Richmond Colts | Piedmont League | Vinnie Smith |
| B | Knoxville Smokies | Tri-State League | Frank Genovese |
| C | Erie Sailors | Middle Atlantic League | Pete Pavich |
| C | St. Cloud Rox | Northern League | Charlie Fox |
| C | Idaho Falls Russets | Pioneer League | Johnny Babich, Lou Garland and Frank Gabler |
| C | Reno Silver Sox | Sunset League | Lilio Marcucci |
| C | Fort Smith Giants | Western Association | Harold Kollar |
| D | Bristol Twins | Appalachian League | Ben Geraghty |
| D | Sanford Giants | Florida State League | Hal Gruber |
| D | Hickory Rebels | North Carolina State League | Owen Linn, Thomas Jackson, William Proctor and Charlie Bowles |
| D | Springfield Giants | Ohio–Indiana League | Tony Ravish |
| D | Lawton Giants | Sooner State League | Louis Brower |
| D | Lenoir Red Sox | Western Carolina League | Claude Jonnard |
| D | Oshkosh Giants | Wisconsin State League | Dave Garcia |

LEAGUE CHAMPIONS: Trenton, Lawton, Oshkosh
