= Bill Glynn (baseball) =

American baseball player (1925–2013)

- First baseman
- Born: July 30, 1925; Sussex, New Jersey, U.S.
- Died: January 15, 2013 (aged 87); San Diego, California, U.S.
- Batted: Left Threw: Left

MLB debut
- September 16, 1949, for the Philadelphia Phillies

Last MLB appearance
- September 26, 1954, for the Cleveland Indians

MLB statistics
- Batting average: .249
- Home runs: 10
- Runs batted in: 56
- Stats at Baseball Reference

Teams
- Philadelphia Phillies (1949); Cleveland Indians (1952–1954)

William Vincent Glynn (July 30, 1925 – January 15, 2013) was an American professional baseball first baseman, who played in Major League Baseball (MLB) for all or portions of four seasons with the Philadelphia Phillies (1949) and Cleveland Indians 1952–1954. Glynn threw and batted left-handed, stood 6 feet (1.8 m) tall and weighed 190 pounds (86 kg).

Born in Sussex, New Jersey, Glynn attended Franklin High School, where he played baseball, basketball, and football. He was a United States Army veteran of World War II, and began his pro career in 1946.

Glynn played for the Utica Blue Sox in 1947, a team that won the Governor's Cup as Eastern League champions. The Blue Sox were then a farm club of the Philadelphia Phillies. He briefly played for the 1949 Phils as a late September call-up. Traded to the Sacramento Solons of the Pacific Coast League after the 1951 campaign, he was acquired by the Indians in July of the following season. He remained with the Tribe into the spring of 1955, with his last MLB appearance occurring during the 1954 World Series against the New York Giants. Glynn appeared in Games 1 and 3, striking out against Marv Grissom in the tenth inning of the former, and doubling off Rubén Gómez in the latter. His Indians lost both contests as the Giants swept them in four straight games.

In 310 games over four MLB seasons, Glynn posted a .249 batting average (170-for-684) with 94 runs, 22 doubles, four triples, 10 home runs, 56 runs batted in (RBI), and 61 bases on balls. He finished his career with a .989 fielding percentage as a first baseman.

Glynn died on January 15, 2013. He was interred at Fort Rosecrans National Cemetery.
