= Bob Chesnes =

American baseball player (1921–1979)

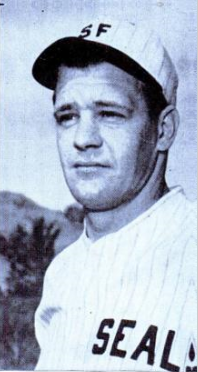
- Pitcher
- Born: May 6, 1921; Oakland, California, U.S.
- Died: May 23, 1979 (aged 58); Everett, Washington, U.S.
- Batted: Switch Threw: Right

MLB debut
- May 6, 1948, for the Pittsburgh Pirates

Last MLB appearance
- September 27, 1950, for the Pittsburgh Pirates

MLB statistics
- Win–loss record: 24–22
- Earned run average: 4.66
- Strikeouts: 130
- Stats at Baseball Reference

Teams
- Pittsburgh Pirates (1948–1950)

Robert Vincent Chesnes (May 6, 1921 – May 23, 1979) was an American professional baseball player, a right-handed pitcher who worked in 61 games pitched in the Major Leagues from 1948 through 1950 for the Pittsburgh Pirates. The native of Oakland, California, stood 6 feet (1.83 m) tall and weighed 180 pounds (82 kg).

Chesnes entered organized baseball in 1940 as an infielder in the Class D Northeast Arkansas League. He began his conversion to full-time pitcher the following season. Then, after 1942, his professional career was interrupted by three years of service (1943–45) in the United States Coast Guard during World War II.

Returning to baseball in 1946, he posted three highly successful consecutive seasons, including a stellar rookie year in Major League Baseball. After going 18–6 with a 1.52 earned run average in the Class C Pioneer League in 1946, Chesnes was promoted all the way to the Triple-A San Francisco Seals of the Pacific Coast League for 1947. There he won 22 games and lost eight, leading the PCL in winning percentage (.733) as well as in earned run average with a 2.32 mark. That off-season, the Pirates acquired Chesnes from the unaffiliated Seals for $100,000 and four players (including outfielder Gene Woodling and catcher Dixie Howell).

Chesnes made his MLB debut on his 27th birthday in relief against the New York Giants, but soon became a starting pitcher in the Pittsburgh rotation. He won 14 of 20 decisions with 15 complete games and a earned run average of 3.57, as the Pirates climbed into the National League's first division. His 14 victories led the Bucs, and the switch-hitting former infielder also batted a strong .275 in 98 at bats, best among Pirate pitchers. But Chesnes' final two seasons in Pittsburgh were plagued by arm miseries. He went only 10–16 during 1949–50 and his ERA ballooned to a composite 5.81. Chesnes spent part of 1950 and all of 1951 in the minor leagues before leaving the game.

All told, he allowed 377 hits and 189 bases on balls with 130 strikeouts in 378 2/3 innings pitched during his MLB career, with one shutout and one save. As a hitter, Chesnes had a lifetime batting average of .256, with two home runs and 15 runs batted in.
