= Dewey Adkins =

American baseball player (1918–1998)

- Pitcher
- Born: May 11, 1918; Norcatur, Kansas, U.S.
- Died: December 26, 1998 (aged 80); Santa Monica, California, U.S.
- Batted: Right Threw: Right

MLB debut
- September 19, 1942, for the Washington Senators

Last MLB appearance
- October 2, 1949, for the Chicago Cubs

MLB statistics
- Win–loss record: 2–4
- Earned run average: 5.64
- Strikeouts: 47
- Stats at Baseball Reference

Teams
- Washington Senators (1942–1943); Chicago Cubs (1949)

John Dewey Adkins (May 11, 1918 – December 26, 1998) was an American Major League Baseball pitcher for the Washington Senators and Chicago Cubs in the 1940s. In a three-season career, Adkins won two games, lost four, and had an earned run average (ERA) of 5.64.

Born in Norcatur, Kansas, Adkins made his major league debut on September 19, 1942, as a late-season call-up for the Senators, starting the only game he appeared in that season. He allowed 8 runs (7 earned) in 6 1/3 innings but did not figure in the decision. Adkins made a few more appearances for Washington the next season, all in relief, compiling a 2.61 ERA in seven games.

After eventually finding himself playing for Atlanta in the independent minor league Southern Association, Adkins did not make another appearance at the big league level until the age of 31. Reemerging with the Chicago Cubs in 1949, Adkins saw his most extensive major league action. He pitched in thirty games as both a starter and a reliever, completing one of his five starts and finishing fourteen of the 25 games in which he appeared as a reliever. Adkins also hit his only major league home run as a member of the 1949 Cubs. His 1949 record of 2–4 and ERA of 5.68 failed to get him a job the next season, and he never again appeared at the major league level.

Adkins died on December 26, 1998, in Santa Monica, California.
