= Granny Hamner =

American baseball player (1927–1993)

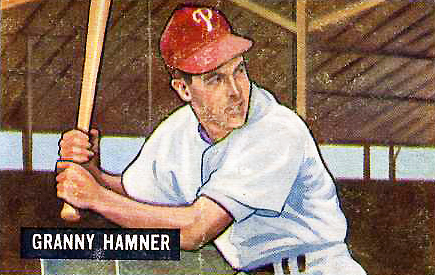
- Shortstop / Second baseman
- Born: April 26, 1927; Richmond, Virginia, U.S.
- Died: September 12, 1993 (aged 66); Philadelphia, Pennsylvania, U.S.
- Batted: Right Threw: Right

MLB debut
- September 14, 1944, for the Philadelphia Phillies

Last MLB appearance
- August 1, 1962, for the Kansas City Athletics

MLB statistics
- Batting average: .262
- Home runs: 104
- Runs batted in: 708
- Stats at Baseball Reference

Teams
- Philadelphia Phillies (1944–1959); Cleveland Indians (1959); Kansas City Athletics (1962)

Career highlights and awards
- 3× All-Star (1952–1954); Philadelphia Phillies Wall of Fame

Granville Wilbur "Granny" Hamner (April 26, 1927 – September 12, 1993) was an American professional baseball shortstop and second baseman in Major League Baseball (MLB). Hamner was one of the key players on the "Whiz Kids", the 1950 National League (NL) champion Philadelphia Phillies.

== Career ==
Hamner was born in Richmond, Virginia and graduated from Benedictine High School. His brother Garvin was also an infielder in the big leagues. "Granny" spent 15 1/2 years with the Phillies, having come to the club as a 17-year-old during World War II. In 1945, still seventeen, he became the youngest player ever to start an Opening Day game, a record that still stands as of 2022. By the Phillies' 1950 NL pennant season, he was one of the team leaders, age 23. A right-handed hitting shortstop with moderate power, Hamner compiled more than 80 runs batted in (RBI) four times.

In the 1950 World Series, a four-game New York Yankees sweep dominated by Yankee pitchers, Hamner batted .429 (6 for 14) with three extra-base hits. In March 1952, manager Eddie Sawyer named Hamner team captain of the Phillies.

An All-Star three years in a row, Hamner was the National League's starting shortstop in the 1952 All-Star Game, played on his home field, Shibe Park, in Philadelphia. The game was called off after five innings due to rain.

On May 16, 1959, Hamner was traded to the Cleveland Indians, but he batted only .164 for the remainder of the campaign. Hamner then became a Kansas City Athletics’ Minor League Baseball (MiLB), manager, reappearing briefly with the A's as a pitcher during the 1962 season. (He had begun dabbling on the mound for the 1956-57 Phillies). But the change did not prolong Hamner's playing career. He briefly managed in the Phils' farm system in the 1970s and 1980s.

In 17 major league seasons, Hamner compiled a .262 batting average with 104 home runs. As a pitcher, he was winless with two losses, with an earned run average (ERA) of 5.40, in seven games, and 13 1/3 innings pitched.

== Later life ==
In 1980, Hamner was one of several drivers who were able to stop their vehicles on the Sunshine Skyway Bridge in Florida before reaching the gap in the roadway caused by the collapse of a span after the freighter MV Summit Venture collided with the bridge.

In 1981, Hamner was inducted into the Virginia Sports Hall of Fame.

On September 12, 1993, Hamner died of a heart attack at age 66 in Philadelphia.
