= Jackie Mayo =

American baseball player (1925-2014)

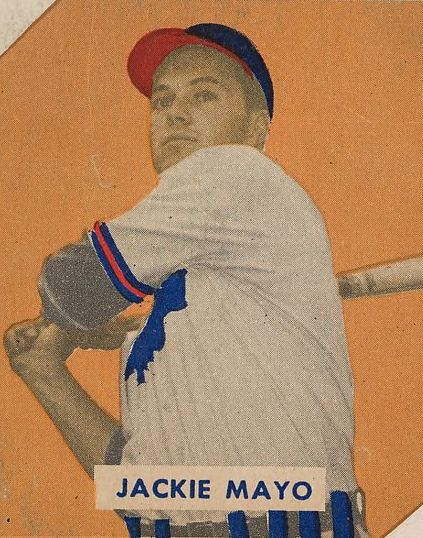
- 1949 Bowman card
- Outfielder
- Born: July 26, 1925; Litchfield, Illinois, U.S.
- Died: August 19, 2014 (aged 89); North Lima, Ohio, U.S.
- Batted: Right Threw: Right

MLB debut
- September 19, 1948, for the Philadelphia Phillies

Last MLB appearance
- September 27, 1953, for the Philadelphia Phillies

MLB statistics
- Batting average: .213
- Home runs: 1
- Runs batted in: 12
- Stats at Baseball Reference

Teams
- Philadelphia Phillies (1948–1953)

John Lewis Mayo (July 26, 1925 – August 19, 2014) was an American professional baseball player who appeared in 139 Major League games for the Philadelphia Phillies between 1948 and 1953.

== Biography ==
Mayo was born in Litchfield, Illinois, and his birth name was John Lewis. In 1947, shortly after graduating from the University of Notre Dame where he was captain of the baseball team, Mayo signed with the Phillies as an amateur free agent.

He appeared in three games of the 1950 World Series, and in one plate appearance, in Game 2, he drew a base on balls against Allie Reynolds of the New York Yankees as a pinch hitter for Robin Roberts leading off the tenth inning. Although Mayo was bunted safely to second base, he remained stranded there as the Yankees won, 2–1.

Mayo was part of the team that won the National League pennant in 1950 and was regarded as one of the Philadelphia Whiz Kids.

Following his retirement from Major League Baseball, Mayo retired to Youngstown, Ohio.
