= Bill Nicholson (baseball) =

American baseball player (1914–1996)

- Nicholson in 1942 card
- Outfielder
- Born: December 11, 1914; Chestertown, Maryland, U.S.
- Died: March 8, 1996 (aged 81); Chestertown, Maryland, U.S.
- Batted: Left Threw: Right

MLB debut
- June 13, 1936, for the Philadelphia Athletics

Last MLB appearance
- September 19, 1953, for the Philadelphia Phillies

MLB statistics
- Batting average: .268
- Home runs: 235
- Runs batted in: 948
- Stats at Baseball Reference

Teams
- Philadelphia Athletics (1936); Chicago Cubs (1939–1948); Philadelphia Phillies (1949–1953)

Career highlights and awards
- 5× All-Star (1940, 1941, 1943–1945); 2× NL home run leader (1943, 1944); 2× NL RBI leader (1943, 1944)

William Beck "Swish" Nicholson (December 11, 1914 – March 8, 1996) was an American right fielder in Major League Baseball who played for the Philadelphia Athletics (1936), Chicago Cubs (1939–1948) and Philadelphia Phillies (1949–1953). A native of Chestertown, Maryland, where he attended Washington College, he batted left-handed and threw right-handed.

In 1944, Nicholson received an intentional walk with the bases loaded. He is listed as one of only seven players in major league history to do it. The others are Abner Dalrymple (1881), Nap Lajoie (1901), Del Bissonette (1928), Barry Bonds (1998), Josh Hamilton (2008), and Corey Seager (2022).

== Career ==
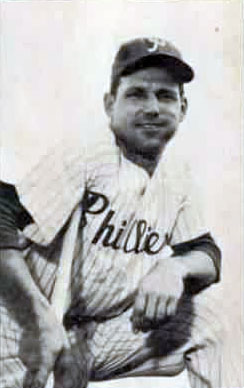
Undated photo of Nicholson with Phillies

In a 16-year career, Nicholson posted a .268 batting average with 235 home runs and 948 run batted in in 1,677 games.

At 6 feet tall and 205 pounds, he was an imposing figure at the plate. While awaiting each pitch, he would loosen up with determined practice swings, ending each with his bat aimed at the pitcher, and holding that pose for several seconds. With each practice swing, the fans would chant "Swish."

Nicknamed "Swish" because of his mighty swing, which often missed the ball, Nicholson twice led the National League in home runs and runs batted in. He played briefly in the American League for the Philadelphia Athletics in 1936, then spent two years in the minors before joining the Chicago Cubs in 1939.

Nicholson became a regular with the Cubs in 1940. His most productive season came in 1943, when he hit .309 with a league-leading 29 home runs and 128 runs batted in. He finished third in the NL MVP Award vote behind Stan Musial and Walker Cooper.

In 1944, Nicholson slipped to .287, but he again led the NL in home runs (33) and runs batted in (122), as well as runs (116) and total bases (317). In the same season, after hitting four consecutive homers in a July 23 doubleheader at the Polo Grounds, he came to bat with the bases loaded in the eighth inning of the second game, and was intentionally walked. Obviously, that forced in a run, but the Cubs could not score again and the Giants won the game, 12–10. This time, he lost the MVP honors by one vote to Marty Marion.

Although Nicholson helped the Cubs to the 1945 pennant, his failing eyesight resulted in a slip in production. He hit only .243 with 13 home runs and 88 runs batted in during the regular season, and batted just .214 with eight runs batted in during Chicago's seven-game loss to the Detroit Tigers in the World Series. The eight RBIs was the record for a 7-game World Series.

In 1949, Nicholson was traded to the Philadelphia Phillies, where he became a part-time player and frequent pinch-hitter. The next season, after he became weak and lost weight, it was disclosed that Nicholson was diabetic. He was unable to play in the World Series with his "Whiz Kids" teammates against the Yankees. Well respected as one of the toughest men to double up, Nicholson hit into double plays only once every 90.7 at-bats. He finished his career in 1953 with eight pinch homers.

Bill Nicholson died in Chestertown, Maryland, aged 81.

== Highlights ==
- 5-time All-Star (1940–41, 1943–45)
- Twice led NL in home runs (1943–44)
- Twice led NL in runs batted in (1943–44)
- Led NL in runs (1944)
- One of five NL right fielders to register 11 total chances in a game (1945). The others are Harry Schafer (1877), Greasy Neale (1920), Casey Stengel (1920) and Bake McBride (1978). The major league record is held by Tony Armas, who handled 12 chances in an AL game (1982).

== See also ==
- List of Major League Baseball career home run leaders
- List of Major League Baseball annual runs batted in leaders
- List of Major League Baseball annual home run leaders
- List of Major League Baseball annual runs scored leaders
