= 1949 in baseball =

The following are the baseball events of the year 1949 throughout the world.

== Champions ==
=== Major League Baseball ===
- World Series: New York Yankees over Brooklyn Dodgers (4–1)
- All-Star Game, July 12 at Ebbets Field: American League, 11–7

=== Caribbean leagues ===
- Cuban League: Alacranes del Almendares
- Panamanian League: Refresqueros de Spur Cola
- Mexican Pacific League: Tacuarineros de Culiacán
- Puerto Rican League: Indios de Mayagüez
- Venezuelan League: Cervecería Caracas

=== Club tournaments ===
- Caribbean Series: Alacranes del Almendares
- Interamerican Series: New York Stars

=== Other champions ===
- All-American Girls Professional Baseball League: Rockford Peaches
- College World Series: Texas
- Little League World Series: Hammonton, New Jersey
- Negro League Baseball All-Star Game: East, 4–0

== Awards and honors ==
- Baseball Hall of Fame
  - Mordecai Brown
  - Charlie Gehringer
  - Kid Nichols
- Most Valuable Player
  - Ted Williams (AL)
  - Jackie Robinson (NL)
- Rookie of the Year
  - Roy Sievers (AL)
  - Don Newcombe (NL)
- The Sporting News Player of the Year Award
  - Ted Williams (AL) – OF, Boston Red Sox
- The Sporting News Manager of the Year Award
  - Casey Stengel (AL) – New York Yankees

== Statistical leaders ==
	American League		National League	
Stat	Player	Total	Player	Total
AVG	George Kell (DET)	.343	Jackie Robinson (BRO)	.342
HR	Ted Williams (BOS)	43	Ralph Kiner (PIT)	54
RBI	Vern Stephens (BOS); Ted Williams (BOS)	159	Ralph Kiner (PIT)	127
W	Mel Parnell (BOS)	25	Warren Spahn (BSN)	21
ERA	Mike Garcia (CLE)	2.36	Dave Koslo (NYG)	2.50
K	Virgil Trucks (DET)	153	Warren Spahn (BSN)	151

== Major league baseball final standings ==
=== American League final standings ===
American League
Team	W	L	Pct.	GB	Home	Road
New York Yankees	97	57	.630	—	54‍–‍23	43‍–‍34
Boston Red Sox	96	58	.623	1	61‍–‍16	35‍–‍42
Cleveland Indians	89	65	.578	8	49‍–‍28	40‍–‍37
Detroit Tigers	87	67	.565	10	50‍–‍27	37‍–‍40
Philadelphia Athletics	81	73	.526	16	52‍–‍25	29‍–‍48
Chicago White Sox	63	91	.409	34	32‍–‍45	31‍–‍46
St. Louis Browns	53	101	.344	44	36‍–‍41	17‍–‍60
Washington Senators	50	104	.325	47	26‍–‍51	24‍–‍53

Locations of teams for the 1942–1953 American League seasons
American League

=== National League final standings ===
National League
Team	W	L	Pct.	GB	Home	Road
Brooklyn Dodgers	97	57	.630	—	48‍–‍29	49‍–‍28
St. Louis Cardinals	96	58	.623	1	51‍–‍26	45‍–‍32
Philadelphia Phillies	81	73	.526	16	40‍–‍37	41‍–‍36
Boston Braves	75	79	.487	22	43‍–‍34	32‍–‍45
New York Giants	73	81	.474	24	43‍–‍34	30‍–‍47
Pittsburgh Pirates	71	83	.461	26	36‍–‍41	35‍–‍42
Cincinnati Reds	62	92	.403	35	35‍–‍42	27‍–‍50
Chicago Cubs	61	93	.396	36	33‍–‍44	28‍–‍49

Locations of teams for the 1943–1952 National League seasons
National League

== All-American Girls Professional Baseball League final standings ==
Rank	Team	W	L	Pct.	GB
1	South Bend Blue Sox	75	36	.676	—
2	Rockford Peaches	75	36	.676	—
3	Grand Rapids Chicks	57	54	.514	18
4	Kenosha Comets	58	55	.505	19
5	Fort Wayne Daisies	52	57	.477	23
6	Muskegon Lassies	46	66	.411	29 1/2
7	Racine Belles	45	65	.409	29 1/2
8	Peoria Redwings	36	73	.330	39

== Nippon Professional Baseball final standings ==
Team	G	W	L	T	Pct.	GB
Yomiuri Giants	134	85	48	1	.639	-
Hankyu Braves	136	69	64	3	.519	16.0
Daiei Stars	134	67	65	2	.508	17.5
Nankai Hawks	135	67	67	1	.500	18.5
Chunichi Dragons	137	66	68	3	.493	19.5
Osaka Tigers	137	65	69	3	.485	20.5
Tokyu Flyers	138	64	73	1	.467	23.0
Taiyo Robins	133	52	81	0	.391	33.0

== Events ==
=== January ===
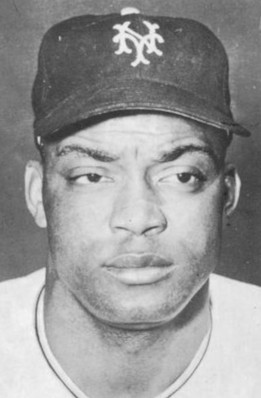
Monte Irvin in 1955

- January 12 – The New York Giants are fined $2,000, and manager Leo Durocher $500, for signing coach Freddie Fitzsimmons while he was still under contract to the Boston Braves. Fitzsimmons gets a $500 fine and a 30-day spring training suspension.
- January 17 – The New York Yankees sell the contract of right-hander Bill Bevens to the Chicago White Sox. Bevens, 32, was one of the most talked-about players of the 1947 World Series—starting Game 4 and holding the Brooklyn Dodgers hitless over 82/3 innings before surrendering a pinch double and the game itself to Cookie Lavagetto's clutch hit. Bevens makes one more appearance in pinstripes, in a Game 7 victory, before a dead arm keeps on the sidelines for all of 1948. In fact, Bevens never pitches another MLB game after the 1947 Fall Classic. The White Sox return him to the Bombers because of his sore arm on March 28 and Bevens sits out the 1949 campaign as well. He's able to hurl in the minors from 1950–1953 before leaving baseball.
- January 20 – The Detroit Tigers purchase the contract of outfielder Don Lund from the St. Louis Browns. Lund, 25, a former star athlete at the University of Michigan, will go to coach the Wolverines' baseball team to the 1962 College World Series championship and serve as key Tigers' executive.
- January 25 – Lou Boudreau is rewarded for the Cleveland Indians' championship with a two-year, $65,000 annual contract as shortstop-manager.
- January 27 – Fred Saigh buys out the interest of Robert Hannegan and now controls 90 percent of the St. Louis Cardinals' stock. Saigh and Hannegan had swung the purchase in 1947 with only $60,300 in cash in a $4 million deal. Hannegan comes out with $866,000 profit in two years.
- January 28 – The New York Giants sign their first black players, outfielder Monte Irvin and pitcher Ford Smith. They are assigned to minor-league Jersey City. Irvin will star for the Giants and be elected to the Baseball Hall of Fame, but Smith never makes the National League.
- January 29 – The Pittsburgh Pirates acquire pitcher Murry Dickson from the St. Louis Cardinals for $125,000.

=== February ===
- February 2 – Brothers Bill DeWitt and Charlie DeWitt gain control of the St. Louis Browns by acquiring 57 percent of the stock from Richard Muckerman for $1 million.
- February 7 – Perennial All-Star and three-time former Most Valuable Player Joe DiMaggio signs with the New York Yankees for $100,000, the first six-figure contract in Major League history.
- February 9:
  - A federal appeals court orders the $300,000 suit against Major League Baseball by former New York Giants outfielder and Mexican League "contract jumper" Danny Gardella back to a lower court for trial.
  - The defending MLB champion Cleveland Indians release 33-year-old outfielder Wally Judnich on waivers to the Pittsburgh Pirates. Judnich was Cleveland's starting right fielder in four of the six games of the 1948 World Series.
- February 19 – The Indians sign Homestead Grays slugger Luke Easter to a free-agent contract and assign him to San Diego of the Pacific Coast League. Easter, 33, led the 1948 Negro National League in home runs. Although hampered by knee miseries, he will hit 25 homers and bat .363 in 80 PCL games and be called up to Cleveland in August.
- February 20 – The first Caribbean Series is inaugurated with a doubleheader at Havana. In the first game, Indios de Mayagüez of Puerto Rico faces Spur Cola Colonites of Panama, while the Cuban host team, Alacranes del Almendares, takes on Cervecería Caracas of Venezuela in the nightcap. The Cuban club will win the best-of-six-days Series with a perfect 6–0 record, followed by Venezuela (3–3), Panama (2–4) and Puerto Rico (1–5).

=== March ===
- March 1 – The St. Louis Browns, owners of Sportsman's Park, move to evict the St. Louis Cardinals in order to gain a rental increase.
- March 2 – Joe DiMaggio leaves the New York Yankees' spring training camp to have an ailing right heel examined at Johns Hopkins Hospital. DiMaggio is assured that surgery is unnecessary and returns to the Yankees. The as yet undiagnosed heel ailment will continue to plague DiMaggio throughout the season. DiMaggio is hitting just 7-for-31 in the Grapefruit League.
- March 8 – Former Cardinals pitchers Max Lanier and Fred Martin, late of the Mexican League, file a $2.5 million suit against Major League Baseball. A federal judge on April 1 will deny their right to be reinstated.
- March 28 – Manager Leo Durocher of the New York Giants makes a deal with his former team, the Brooklyn Dodgers, acquiring right-handed hurler Hank Behrman, 27, in a straight-cash transaction.

=== April ===
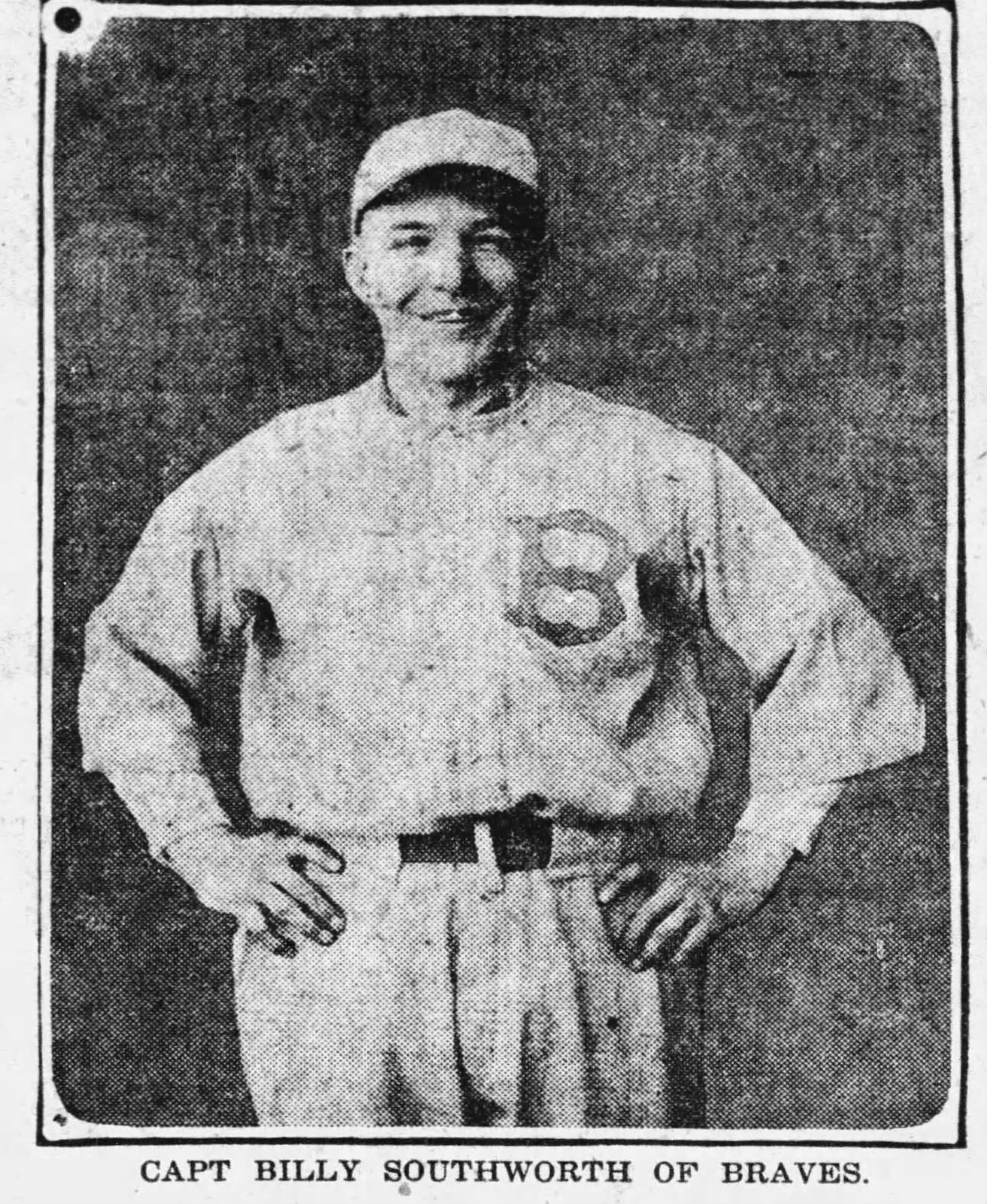
Outfielder Billy Southworth as captain of the 1923 Boston Braves

- April 8 – Dissension rumors surround the defending National League-champion Boston Braves after manager Billy Southworth calls a closed meeting of the club in a South Carolina hotel.
- April 12 – Joe DiMaggio returns to Johns Hopkins Hospital due to continuing pain in his right heel. The Yankee center fielder is diagnosed with a bone spur, which will cause him to miss 65 games during the season.
- April 18 – On Opening Day, the Philadelphia Phillies shut out the Boston Braves, 4–0, behind Ken Heintzelman at Braves Field, and the Washington Senators defeat the Philadelphia Athletics 3–2 at Griffith Stadium.
- April 19:
  - At pregame ceremonies marking the season opener in Yankee Stadium, a granite monument to the late Babe Ruth is unveiled in center field. Plaques honoring Lou Gehrig and Miller Huggins are also presented. Mayor William O'Dwyer, Governor Thomas E. Dewey, and Babe's widow, Claire Merritt Ruth, are in attendance. In the game—Casey Stengel's debut as manager of the Yankees—the Bombers edge the Senators 3–2 on Tommy Henrich's ninth-inning solo home run, what will later be termed a "walk-off homer." Gene Woodling plays center field in place of the injured Joe DiMaggio.
  - In Brooklyn, the Dodgers pay tribute to Jack "Shorty" Laurice, the club's "number one" fan and leader of the Ebbets Field "Sym-phony" band. Laurice died in 1948.
  - Before 53,000 at Briggs Stadium, Detroit Tigers rookie Johnny Groth homers twice in his first three at-bats against the Chicago White Sox.
- April 20 – Philadelphia Phillies third baseman Willie Jones hits four consecutive doubles, tying an NL mark with Dick Bartell (1933) and Ernie Lombardi (1935).
- April 24 – Lloyd Merriman of the Cincinnati Reds hits a home run and a triple in his first major league game.
- April 28 – A New York fan charges Leo Durocher with assault after the Giants lose 15–2 to Brooklyn. Commissioner Happy Chandler suspends Durocher but he is absolved on May 3. Chandler criticizes teams for relaxed security that allows fans on the field.
- April 26 – Brooklyn Dodgers Gene Hermanski, Jackie Robinson, and Gil Hodges combine for a 7–4–3 triple play during a 5–2 win over the visiting Boston Braves. It is the only triple play in Brooklyn Dodgers history.
- April 30 – Rocky Nelson hits an "inside-the-glove" two-run home run in short center-left field to turn a ninth inning 3–1 Chicago Cubs lead into a 4–3 St. Louis Cardinals victory. Cubs center fielder Andy Pafko's catch is ruled a trap by umpire Al Barlick, as Pafko races in, holding the ball high as runners circle the bases.

=== May ===
- May 1 – Elmer Valo becomes the first American League player to hit two bases-loaded triples in a game when he leads the Philadelphia Athletics to a 15–9 win in the opener of a doubleheader against the Washington Senators at Shibe Park. Valo will hit a third bases-loaded triple on July 18, to tie Shano Collins for the AL mark, set in 1918. The A's also take Game 2, 7–3, called after seven innings.
- May 3 – Taking advantage of "Home Run Lane," the dramatically shortened outfield fence installed by first-year Chicago White Sox general manager Frank Lane at Comiskey Park, the Washington Senators belt seven home runs—and need them all—in beating Chicago, 14–12 in 10 innings. This is the first time in MLB history a team has collected seven homers in an extra-inning contest. Clyde Vollmer leads the long-ball parade with a pair, followed by Mark Christman, Gil Coan, Al Evans, Eddie Robinson and Bud Stewart. The Sox get homers from Joe Tipton and Gus Zernial.
- May 4:
  - Chicago White Sox infielder Floyd Baker, who will play 874 games in his 13-year major league career, hits his only career home run into "Home Run Lane" in an 8–7 loss to the Senators. Baker victimizes Washington right-hander Sid Hudson.
  - A day after the two teams played to a 13-inning, 14–14 tie, the Detroit Tigers beat the Boston Red Sox 5–1 behind Virgil Trucks' three-hitter. The Tigers shell Boston pitcher Mickey Harris for 14 hits in 52/3 innings.

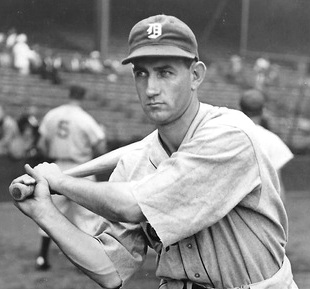
Charlie Gehringer in 1935

- May 5:
  - Charlie Gehringer, star second baseman of the Detroit Tigers from 1925 though 1941, is selected for the Baseball Hall of Fame. Two days later, the Old-Timers committee will select Kid Nichols and Mordecai Brown.
  - At the Polo Grounds, Johnny Mize pounds a tenth-inning home run and the New York Giants beat the Pittsburgh Pirates 3–2 to sweep their three-game series. The homer, off Murry Dickson, is the 300th for Mize. Reliever Hank Behrman, in for Sheldon Jones, pitches out of tight jams in the ninth and tenth innings for the win. Wally Westlake is stranded in the tenth after reaching Behrman for a leadoff triple.
  - Before the start of a series with the New York Yankees, the Chicago White Sox get rid of "Home Run Lane," the five-foot-high chicken wire barrier erected to cut the Comiskey Park's home-run distance by 20 feet, foul pole to foul pole. It resulted in 11 home runs in eight games, with opponents hitting seven of them. The AL will subsequently rule that fences cannot be moved more than once a season. The Yankees still win today, 7–5, to go 13–3 on the young season. Tommy Henrich has the only homer, while left-fielder Johnny Lindell twice makes catches that would've cleared the wire fence. Allie Reynolds, with help from Joe Page, is the winning pitcher.
  - At Cleveland, Bob Feller, making his first start since pitching two innings in the season opener and coming up with a sore shoulder, beats the Boston Red Sox 7–3. Cleveland scores six runs in the second inning, including a three-run home run by Ken Keltner off Jack Kramer. On the next pitch, rookie Minnie Miñoso, making his second start, hits his first major-league homer. Ted Williams and Bobby Doerr hit eighth-inning homers for the Red Sox, while Joe Gordon adds a homer in the fifth for Cleveland.
  - Two outfielders change clubs when the Boston Red Sox acquire Al Zarilla from the St. Louis Browns for Stan Spence and cash considerations.
- May 6 – Philadelphia Athletics pitcher Bobby Shantz makes a sensational debut, tossing nine hitless innings in relief in a 13-inning 5–4 Athletics win over the Detroit Tigers. Shantz finally gives up two hits and a run in the 13th, but old-timer Wally Moses, now back with the A's, saves him with a two-run home run in the bottom of the 13th.
- May 8:
  - At Shibe Park, the Cincinnati Reds score five runs in the ninth inning to take a 7–3 lead, but the Philadelphia Phillies tie to go into extra innings. Cincinnati then scores seven runs in the 12th to win 14–7.
  - Sam Breadon, owner of the St. Louis Cardinals from 1920 to 1947, dies at age 72. Robert E. Hannegan, the man to whom Breadon sold the Redbirds, will himself pass away on October 6 at age 46.
- May 9:
  - At Briggs Stadium, the Detroit Tigers set back the first-place New York Yankees 4–1, behind the five-hit pitching of Ted Gray. Vic Raschi also allows just five hits, including a home run by Dick Wakefield, in taking the loss.
  - The first-place New York Giants win their seventh game in a row as pitcher Sheldon Jones stops the Chicago Cubs 7–2. Aided by ten walks and home runs by Sid Gordon and Willard Marshall, the Giants pin the loss on starter Ralph Hamner, who allows one hit in three innings.
- May 10 – Southpaw knuckle-baller Mickey Haefner allows a first-inning single to Larry Doby, then holds Doby's Cleveland Indians hitless the rest of the way, as the visiting Washington Senators eke out a 1–0 road victory. Haefner's is the first of eight one-hitters this year in the majors.
- May 11 – The Boston Red Sox release veteran right-hander Denny Galehouse. Only seven months before, the 37-year-old hurler had been manager Joe McCarthy's surprise, and controversial, selection as the Bosox' starting pitcher in the 1948 American League tie-breaker game at Fenway Park. Galehouse's poor three-inning stint doomed the Red Sox, who lost the 1948 AL pennant by dropping an 8–3 decision to the Cleveland Indians. He makes two ineffective relief appearances for Boston in 1949 before today's release ends his MLB career.
- May 13 – Commissioner of Baseball Happy Chandler awards the contract of former Negro leagues shortstop Artie Wilson to the New York Yankees after the Bombers lodge a formal complaint over Wilson's signing with the rival Cleveland Indians. Although he's assigned to Triple-A Oakland and never called to the Yankee varsity, Wilson becomes one of the first players to break the organization's color barrier. At Oakland, where he's the Oaks' only black player, he's befriended by 21-year-old second baseman Billy Martin, who offers to become Wilson's roommate.
- May 14 – Roy Sievers hits a home run and a double to drive in four runs, leading the St. Louis Browns' 8–3 victory over the Detroit Tigers. Slick-fielding Detroit first baseman Paul Campbell ties a major league record by making two unassisted double plays. While with minor league Montreal in 1941, Campbell started 26 DPs at first base.
- May 15:
  - In a doubleheader at Comiskey Park, Chicago White Sox pitchers Bill Wight and Al Gettel shut out the Cleveland Indians, 10–0 and 2–0.
  - Boston Braves pitcher Vern Bickford stops the Brooklyn Dodgers 4–0, allowing just four singles. One is by Gil Hodges, extending his hitting streak to 17 games. Jim Russell switch-hits a home run and double to pin the loss on Morrie Martin.
- May 16 – The Chicago Cubs receive infielder Bob Ramazzotti from the Brooklyn Dodgers in exchange for infielder Hank Schenz and $25,000.
- May 18 – The Brooklyn Dodgers send Marv Rackley to the Pittsburgh Pirates for fellow outfielder Johnny Hopp and $25,000. The trade will be nullified June 7, with each player returning to his former organization.
- May 20 – First baseman and former local schoolboy baseball star Elbie Fletcher returns to the Boston Braves, who purchase his contract from the New York Giants' organization. Fletcher, 33, who broke in with the Braves as a teenager in 1934, is acquired to take the place of Earl Torgeson, out for the 1949 season after surgery to repair a separated shoulder suffered on May 14 when he collided with Jackie Robinson in a vain attempt to break up a double play.
- May 22:
  - Brooklyn pitcher Don Newcombe makes his first major league start a dandy, shutting out the Cincinnati Reds 3–0 in the first game of a doubleheader at Crosley Field. It's the first shutout in an NL debut in 11 years and extends Brooklyn's win streak at Cincinnati to 19 games going back to June 1947. Newcombe gives up hits to the first two batters, then allows just three more while walking none. He drives in two runs as well.
  - In the second game, Ken Raffensberger surpasses Newcombe by firing a one-hitter to beat the Dodgers, 2–0, tossing only 83 pitches. The only hit is a leadoff single by Gil Hodges in the eighth inning. Raffensberger pitched two one-hitters against the Dodgers during the 1948 season.
- May 24 – Striking out the last six St. Paul batters, Mickey McDermott of Triple-A Louisville fans a total of 20 for a new American Association record. Southpaw McDermott wins 3–1, striking out the side in the third, fifth, sixth, eighth and ninth innings.
- May 27 – The Cleveland Indians start the season so badly, 12–17, that owner Bill Veeck arranges a "Second Opening Day". Behind pitcher Al Benton, Cleveland make it a success, beating the Chicago White Sox 4–0. The Indians do rise to second place, within 2½ games of the top, but they will finish third, eight games back.
- May 28 – White Sox rookie left fielder Gus Zernial breaks his collarbone making a diving catch against the Indians. He will be out of action for two months. Cleveland pushes across a run in the ninth inning against Howie Judson to take a 3–2 victory. Early Wynn is the winning pitcher.

=== June ===
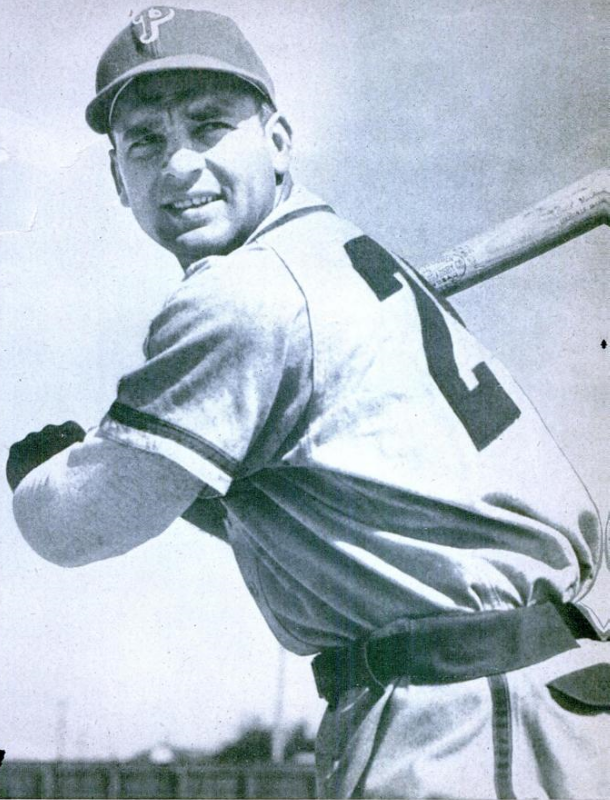
Andy Seminick

- June 2 – At Shibe Park, the Philadelphia Phillies hit five home runs during the same inning (the eighth) in a 12–3 victory over the Cincinnati Reds, tying the major league mark set by the 1939 New York Giants. Andy Seminick belts two, while Del Ennis, Willie Jones and Schoolboy Rowe have one each. Jones adds a triple as Granny Hamner's double jumps the extra bases total to 18, still a record. Seminick collects three homers overall.
- June 5 – Commissioner Happy Chandler lifts his 1946 ban on all players who jumped to the Mexican League. Only Sal Maglie will make a significant mark after the exile. Lou Klein will be the first jumper to make a major-league box score, successfully pinch-hitting on June 16.
- June 6 – The Pittsburgh Pirates deal veteran right-hander Kirby Higbe to the New York Giants for pitcher Ray Poat and infielder Bobby Rhawn, reuniting the 34-year-old Higbe with his old manager in Brooklyn, Leo Durocher. The Pirates also lose pitcher Bob Muncrief on waivers to the Chicago Cubs.
- June 9:
  - Philadelphia Athletics pitcher Dick Fowler records nine putouts in a 12-inning 1–0 victory over the Chicago White Sox.
  - Pennsylvania's two other MLB clubs, the Pirates and the Phillies, go 18 innings at Philadelphia's Shibe Park before the Phils eke out a 4–3 victory. Pittsburgh's Murry Dickson is the hard-luck loser, allowing the winning tally after throwing 112/3 innings of shutout relief; Jim Konstanty, who holds the Bucs scoreless over nine full frames out of the Phillie bullpen, gets the win. It's MLB's longest game by innings in 1949.
- June 12:
  - Frank Frisch, who began the season as coach with the New York Giants, replaces Charlie Grimm as manager of the last-place (19–31) Chicago Cubs.
  - Gil Hodges hits a grand slam and collects eight RBI for the Brooklyn Dodgers in their 20–7 win over the Cincinnati Reds.
- June 13:
  - The so-far disappointing Boston Red Sox (25–24 on the season) shake up their roster by sending left-hander Mickey Harris and outfielder Sam Mele to the Washington Senators for right-hander Walt Masterson.
  - In a trade of catchers, the New York Giants send Walker Cooper to the Cincinnati Reds in exchange for Ray Mueller.
- June 14:
  - Wally Westlake hits for the cycle in the Pittsburgh Pirates' come-from-behind 4–3 win over the Boston Braves at Forbes Field. A solid but unspectacular outfielder (one All-Star selection) over his ten-year MLB career, Westlake hits for the cycle for the second time in two years, the first man ever to achieve the feat twice. He completes his "cycle" with a ninth-inning double that drives in the Bucs' winning run. He is the first of three MLB players to hit for the cycle in 1949.
  - Following the Phillies 4–1 win over the Chicago Cubs at Wrigley Field, first baseman Eddie Waitkus is shot by Ruth Ann Steinhagen, an obsessed fan, at Chicago's Edgewater Beach Hotel. The shooting occurs just before midnight. The bullet punctures Waitkus' lung and lodges near his heart. After undergoing four operations, he recovers enough to play the following season, but he is not the same ballplayer. At the time of the shooting, Waitkus was batting .304 and leading the all-star voting among National League first basemen. Waitkus' shooting serves as the inspiration for the "Roy Hobbs" character in the Bernard Malamud novel, The Natural, and its subsequent film adaptation.
- June 15:
  - The Chicago Cubs make a consequential, all-outfielder trade, acquiring Hank Sauer and Frankie Baumholtz from the Cincinnati Reds for Peanuts Lowrey and Harry Walker. Sauer, 32, will transform from a struggling major-leaguer to a fearsome right-handed slugger—bashing 198 homers in 6½ seasons as a Cub mainstay, winning 1952's National League MVP as co-home-run champion, making two All-Star teams, and becoming a Wrigley Field favorite.
  - It's also a big day for Hank's younger brother, Ed Sauer, 30, a reserve outfielder. The St. Louis Cardinals sell Ed's contract to the Pittsburgh Pirates, who immediately trade him to the Boston Braves for catcher Phil Masi.
  - San Francisco Seals rookie outfielder Dino Restelli joins the Pittsburgh Pirates and hits seven home runs in his first 39 at-bats. He will finish with 12, hitting .250 in 72 games, and is out of the NL the next year.
- June 16 – The Boston Braves bring up 19-year-old Del Crandall from Evansville of the Class B Three-I League and make him their regular catcher. Crandall will make 11 National League All-Star teams and capture four Gold Glove Awards between 1953 and 1962.
- June 24 – The Boston Red Sox pound the St. Louis Browns for 25 hits in a 21–2 win. Ted Williams contributes seven RBI to go along with two home runs, three runs scored, and a stolen base.
- June 25 – Gil Hodges hits for the cycle, including two homers, and drives in four as the Brooklyn Dodgers humble the Pittsburgh Pirates by a football-like score of 17–10. Forbes Field fans witness their second "cycle" in 11 days. The teams combine for nine home runs, one shy of the record.
- June 26:
  - At Yankee Stadium, Pat Mullin of the Detroit Tigers hits three home runs in a Detroit 12–4 win over the New York Yankees.
  - The Brooklyn Dodgers continue to rake, knocking 22 hits (although only one is a homer) to down the Pittsburgh Pirates, 15–3. The lone long ball belongs to Brooklyn's Carl Furillo, who goes five for five, scores four times, and drives in four.

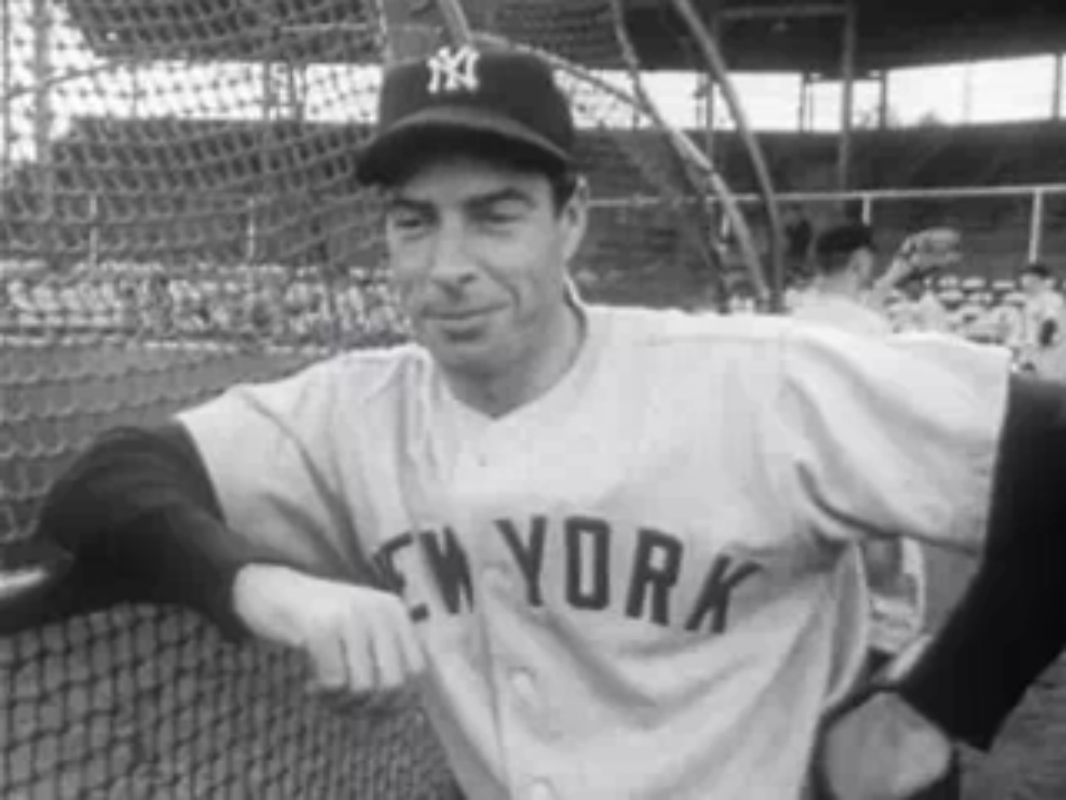
Joe DiMaggio in 1951

- June 28 – After missing the first 65 games of the season due to a bone spur in his right heel, Joe DiMaggio returns to the Yankee lineup with a home run and a single in a 5–4 win over the Boston Red Sox at Fenway Park. The crowd of 36,228 is the largest for a night game in Fenway history. With the win, the first-place Yankees move 4½ games ahead of the second-place Philadelphia Athletics and six games ahead of the third-place Red Sox. DiMaggio will hit four homers in the Bombers' three-game sweep.
- June 29:
  - Mickey Owen and Luis Olmo rejoin the Brooklyn Dodgers from Mexican League exile. Owen is claimed off waivers by the Chicago Cubs on July 2 without appearing in a game for Brooklyn.
  - The Yankees come back from a seven-run deficit to defeat the Red Sox, 9–7. Joe DiMaggio belts two home runs in the win, a three-run shot in the fifth and a tie-breaking two-run blast in the eighth that provides the margin of victory.
- June 30 – Joe DiMaggio belts his fourth home run in three games, a three-run shot off the left field light tower at Fenway Park. DiMaggio's home run powers the Yankees to a 6–3 victory and a three-game sweep of the Red Sox. The Red Sox drop to fifth-place, 8 games behind the front-running Yankees.

=== July ===
- July 2 – Monte Kennedy of the New York Giants shuts out the Brooklyn Dodgers, 16–0. Kennedy contributes a seventh-inning grand slam to his cause. The 16-run margin sets a club record for biggest shutout win that would stand until 2000.
- July 3 – At the Polo Grounds, New York Giants pitcher Monte Kennedy hits a grand slam and shuts out the Brooklyn Dodgers 16–0.
- July 4:
  - At Ebbets Field, the Brooklyn Dodgers (44–28) increase their National League lead to two games over the St. Louis Cardinals (42–30) by winning the holiday twin bill from the Philadelphia Phillies, 7–1 and 8–4, while St. Louis divides with the Chicago Cubs at Wrigley Field.
    - In the Cubs–Cardinals' opening tilt, former four-time NL All-Star catcher Mickey Owen appears in his first big-league game since May 24, 1945, going hitless in three at bats in Chicago's 9–4 defeat. Owen, 33, a prominent "contract jumper" who defected to the Mexican League in 1946, was reinstated from a four-year suspension by the Commissioner of Baseball June 5.
  - In the American League, the first-place New York Yankees and runner-up Philadelphia Athletics each sweep their doubleheaders, enabling the 48–25 Yanks to maintain their 4½-game bulge over the 44–30 Mackmen. In The Bronx, The Yankees take the first game, 3–2, and the rain-shortened second, 6–4. The sweep leaves the Red Sox 12 games behind the first-place Yankees. Meanwhile, at Shibe Park, the Athletics take two from the Washington Senators, 9–7 and 8–0.
- July 6 – Cincinnati Reds catcher Walker Cooper, acquired recently from the Giants, ties a modern record with six hits in seven at-bats, including three home runs with 10 RBI, and scores five times in a 23–4 victory over the Chicago Cubs. Cincinnati's 26 hits and 23 runs scored are the most of any MLB club in a 1949 contest.
- July 7 – New York Giants pitcher Dave Koslo hits the first two home runs of his career while beating the Philadelphia Phillies 11–3 at the Polo Grounds.
- July 8:
  - Hank Thompson and Monte Irvin, called up three days earlier from Jersey City, become the first black players in Giants franchise history. Thompson starts at second base, and Irvin pinch-hits in the eighth inning. When Thompson steps in against Brooklyn Dodger Don Newcombe, it is the first time in major league history that a black batter and pitcher have squared off. The Dodgers win the game, 4–3. Thompson was also the first black to play for the St. Louis Browns in 1947, 12 days after Larry Doby's AL debut with the Cleveland Indians. The Giants are the fourth MLB franchise to break the baseball color line.
  - A 16-inning affair between the Phillies and Braves ends at 1:01 a.m., becoming, to date, the latest-ending National League game in history. Boston wins, 4–3.
- July 12 – The American League defeats the National League, 11–7, in the All-Star Game at Ebbets Field. The NL commits five errors in the game. The contest is noteworthy for also being the first Midsummer Classic to feature black players: Jackie Robinson, Roy Campanella, and Don Newcombe of the National League, and Larry Doby of the American League.
- July 24 – The St. Louis Cardinals beat the Brooklyn Dodgers 14–1, to give St. Louis three straight victories at Ebbets Field, as they take over the NL lead Brooklyn has held through most of the season. Stan Musial hits for the cycle and drives in four runs.
- July 26 – Philadelphia Athletics outfielder Wally Moses gets his 2,000th career hit off Joe Ostrowski of the St. Louis Browns in a 5–4 win.

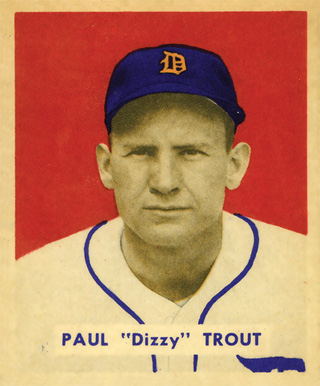
Dizzy Trout

- July 28:
  - A 12-for-25 run raises Jackie Robinson's NL-leading average to .364. He will win the batting title at a career-high .342 average.
  - Detroit Tigers pitcher Dizzy Trout hits a ninth-inning grand slam against the Washington Senators as the Tigers win 13–7 at Griffith Stadium.
- July 31 – At Crosley Field, Sid Gordon of the New York Giants blasts two home runs in the second inning of game two, as the Giants sweep the Cincinnati Reds, 10–0 and 9–0, behind pitchers Larry Jansen and Adrián Zabala.

=== August ===
- August 3 – Boston Red Sox pitcher Ellis Kinder strikes out 14 batters in a 9–3 win over the St. Louis Browns. It is the most strikeouts by a Sox pitcher since Smoky Joe Wood struck out 15 in 1911.
- August 5 – The Chicago White Sox acquire Cuban pitcher Luis Alomá from the Detroit Tigers for Venezuelan righty Álejandro Carrasquel, one of the Mexican League "exiles" recently reinstated by Organized Baseball.
- August 6:
  - Luke Appling appears in his 2,154th game as a shortstop, surpassing the major league mark set by Rabbit Maranville. Appling will finish his career with 2,218 games at shortshop.
  - Adrián Zabala sets a National League record by balking three times in the Giants' 3–1 win over the St. Louis Cardinals. Despite the loss, the Cardinals remain 1/2 game ahead in the National League by virtue of the second-place Brooklyn Dodgers' loss to the Cincinnati Reds.
- August 7 – In the first game of a doubleheader against the Browns, Yankees catcher Yogi Berra suffers a fractured thumb when he is hit by a pitch after hitting a three-run home run in his previous at bat. The injury will keep Berra out of the Yankee lineup until September. The Yankees win the game, 20–2.
- August 8 – Carl Furillo returns to the Dodgers' lineup after an injury and collects two hits and a run scored in Brooklyn's 2–1 win over the rival Giants. The win keeps the Dodgers tied with the Cardinals for first place. Furillo will hit .431 over the final eight weeks of the season and finish at .322, fourth best in the league.
- August 9 – Dominic DiMaggio's 34-game hitting streak is on the line against Vic Raschi and the New York Yankees. Hitless in his first four at-bats, DiMaggio hits a sinking line drive in the eighth inning that his brother Joe catches at his shoetops. Nevertheless, Dom's Boston Red Sox win 6–3, to move 5½ games behind the Yankees. Dom had started his streak after going hitless against Raschi.
- August 15 – Reports of clubhouse turmoil plague the defending National League champion Boston Braves all season. Manager Billy Southworth, who has battled personal tragedy and alcoholism for years, is rumored to be drinking again and some players are known to be contemptuous of him. Braves owner Lou Perini prevails on Southworth to take a leave of absence, and he departs today with his team at 55–54–2, in fourth place in the National League and 13½ games behind the Brooklyn Dodgers. Boston will recover briefly under coach Johnny Cooney but it finishes under .500 at season's end.
- August 17 – The St. Louis Cardinals move back into first place with a 4–3 win over the Cincinnati Reds.
- August 21 – A barrage of bottles from the Shibe Park stands—hurled to protest umpire George Barr's decision over a trapped fly ball to Phillie Richie Ashburn—results in the first forfeiture in the major leagues in seven years. The New York Giants, who were ahead 4–2 with one out in the ninth today over the Philadelphia Phillies when the forfeit is declared, gave one away in 1942 when hordes of youngsters invaded the Polo Grounds field.
- August 22:
  - The New York Yankees acquire 36-year-old slugger Johnny Mize from the NL Giants for $40,000. Mize, a future Hall of Famer (Class of 1981), smashed 51 homers in 1947, 40 in 1948, and 18 in 107 games so far this season. At the time, the Yankees' lead over the now second-place Boston Red Sox is down to 2½ games.
  - The Boston Braves score two runs in the ninth inning to defeat the Brooklyn Dodgers, 7–6. One of the runs comes on Eddie Stanky's first home run of the season. The loss is Brooklyn's sixth in seven games and drops the Dodgers two games behind the Cardinals.
- August 26:
  - In their 4–2 victory over the first-place St. Louis Cardinals today at the Polo Grounds, four New York Giants, including manager Leo Durocher, are ejected by umpires Larry Goetz and Lou Jorda.
  - With a doubleheader sweep of the White Sox, the Red Sox close to within 1½ games of the Yankees. The Red Sox win the first game, 11–4, behind Mel Parnell, who becomes the majors' first 20-game winner of the season, and Ted Williams, who slams his 31st and 32nd home runs of the season. The Red Sox take the second game, 10–7.
- August 27 – Former Mexican League "jumpers" Max Lanier and Fred Martin drop their $2.5 million suit against Major League Baseball.
- August 28 – In the first game of a doubleheader in Chicago, Tommy Henrich crashes into the wall while chasing a Chuck Kress fly ball and fractures two vertebrae. The injury will sideline Henrich for three weeks. In the second game, the newly acquired Johnny Mize dislocates his shoulder. With the exception of seven pinch-hit appearances, he will miss the rest of the regular season. The Yankees are also playing without Yogi Berra, who fractured his thumb earlier in the month. Despite the injuries, the Yankees sweep the doubleheader by scores of 8–7 and 7–5.

=== September ===
- September 3 – In American Association action, Columbus Red Birds pitcher Cot Deal starts and completes a 20-inning game against the Louisville Colonels. In addition to winning the game and giving up one earned run during the 20 innings, Deal collects four hits in eight at-bats.
- September 4 – The St. Louis Cardinals sweep a Sportsman's Park doubleheader against the Cincinnati Reds, 6–4 and 11–2, to push their lead over the Brooklyn Dodgers to 2½ games.
- September 5:
  - At Shibe Park, the New York Yankees sweep a Labor Day twin bill against the Philadelphia Athletics. Joe DiMaggio hits a grand slam and drives in five runs in the Yankees' 13–4 win in the opener. The second game, shortened by darkness, is a 5–2 Bomber triumph. New York's lead over the Boston Red Sox now stands at 1½ games.
  - The Yankees pick up bullpen depth by signing veteran relief pitcher Hugh Casey, released by the Pittsburgh Pirates August 10. Casey, 35, won 70 games and saved 49 others during his seven years (1939–1942, 1946–1948) as a member of the Brooklyn Dodgers.
- September 8 – In an 8–0 win over the Chicago Cubs, Red Schoendienst steals the St. Louis Cardinals' 17th and final base of the season, setting a major league record for fewest steals in a season.
- September 9:
  - Despite terrorizing the NL with his bat and baserunning during the season, Jackie Robinson is picked off base by Dave Koslo, the fourth time this year New York Giants pitchers have nabbed him.
  - At Yankee Stadium, Ellis Kinder wins his 19th game of the season as the Red Sox pound the Yankees, 7–1, cutting the Yankees' lead in the American League to 1½ games.
- September 10 – Stan Musial's two-out, two-run home run in the top of the ninth gives the Cardinals a 6–5 win over the Cincinnati Reds, which maintains St. Louis' one-game lead in the National League.
- September 11:
  - The Washington Senators set a major league record for the most base on balls in an inning by surrendering 11 in the third inning during a 20–5 rout at the hands of the New York Yankees.
  - Stan Musial blasts three home runs as the Cardinals sweep a doubleheader from the Cincinnati Reds, 7–5 and 7–4, to extend their lead over the Dodgers to 1½ games.
- September 13 – Ralph Kiner ties a major league record held by six players with his 4th grand slam of the season. In the Pirates' 11–6 win over the Philadelphia Phillies, Kiner hits 2 home runs and drives in 6 runs. The 2 home runs come in his first 2 at-bats of the game. Kiner had homered in his final 2 at-bats in yesterday's game, making it 4 home runs in 4 consecutive at-bats over 2 games. It is the 2nd time in his career that Kiner has accomplished the feat, having previously done so in 1947. Kiner's 1949 total will include 25 on the road, 29 at Forbes Field, 14 of them in the bullpen enclosure still known as Greenberg Gardens.
- September 14 – Ellis Kinder wins his 20th game of the season, shutting out the Detroit Tigers, 1–0, at Fenway Park. It is also Kinder's 10th consecutive win. Kinder joins teammate Mel Parnell as a 20-game winner. It is the last time this century that the Red Sox will feature a pair of 20-game winners.
- September 15 – Veteran Pittsburgh Pirates pitcher Tiny Bonham dies following an appendectomy and stomach surgery at the age of 36, just 18 days after his last pitching performance, an 8–2 victory over the Philadelphia Phillies. His widow, Ruth, will receive the first benefits under the players pension plan, $90 a month for 10 years.
- September 18 – The injury-plagued Yankees receive another blow when Joe DiMaggio is stricken with pneumonia. Without DiMaggio, the Yankee still top the Indians, 7–3, at Cleveland Municipal Stadium. The Red Sox, however, keep pace with an 11–5 rout of the visiting White Sox to remain 2½ games behind the Yanks. Ted Williams hits his 39th and 40th home runs of the season and drives in 6 runs, giving him 153 RBI for the season. Teammate Vern Stephens also hits his 40th home run and drives in his 150th run.
- September 19:
  - The Yankees stretch their lead of the idle Red Sox to 3 games with a 6–0 blanking of the Indians.
  - Ralph Kiner hits his 50th home run of the season, but the Pirates fall to the Giants, 6–4, in extra-innings.
- September 20 – Jackie Robinson steals home in a 5–0 Brooklyn Dodgers victory against the Chicago Cubs. It is his fifth steal of home this year and the 13th in his three years in the NL. That is the most in the majors since Ben Chapman stole his 15th and last in 1940, his 11th season.
- September 21:
  - The Yankees squander an 8–1 lead at Yankee Stadium and fall to the Chicago White Sox, 9–8. Coupled with the Red Sox' 9–6 victory over the Indians, the Yankees lead shrinks to 2 games.
  - The Cardinals and Dodgers split a doubleheader at Sportsman's Park, leaving the Cards in front by 1½ games. The Cards take the first game, 1–0, while the Dodgers answered back with a 5–0 win in the second.
- September 22 – The Dodgers amass 19 hits and 13 walks in a 19–6 rout of the host Cardinals, bringing the Bums to within a 1/2 game of first-place. Carl Furillo has 7 RBI for Brooklyn. In a losing effort, Stan Musial hits his 32nd home run of the season—his 21st against lefties, a major league record for a left-handed batter that will later be matched by Ken Griffey Jr. in 1996 and 1998.
- September 24:
  - Bob Elliott hits three consecutive home runs in the Boston Braves' 6–4 win over the New York Giants at the Polo Grounds. Warren Spahn wins his 20th game, becoming the first National League pitcher this season to do so. For the decade, Elliot collects a league-best 903 RBI.
  - At Fenway Park, Ellis Kinder pitches a six-hit shutout and Ted Williams lines his 42nd home run to beat the New York Yankees 2–0 and pull the Red Sox one game behind New York. Kinder wins his 13th straight game, is 15–1 at Fenway this season, and moves to 4–0 on the season against the Yankees.
- September 25:
  - At their final home game, the Cardinals win 6–1 over the Cubs on the Cardinals' final game. Coupled with the Dodgers' 5–3 loss to the Phillies, the Cardinals end the day with a 1½ game lead in the National League. The Cardinals held first place for two months to this point.
  - Despite 71 injuries that kept players out of games, Casey Stengel and his New York Yankees have been in first place all season. But today the Boston Red Sox move into a tie for first place with a 4–1 victory over Allie Reynolds. Ted Williams hits his 43rd home run, and Mel Parnell wins his 25th game of the season. Parnell is 16–3 at Fenway Park this year. Joe DiMaggio listens to the game from a hospital, bedridden with pneumonia. The Yankees return to New York and are greeted at Grand Central Station by a huge crowd of fans, including Mrs. Babe Ruth, who predicts, "Whoever wins tomorrow should go all the way."
- September 26 – Before 67,634 at Yankee Stadium, the Red Sox come away with a 7–6 win and move into sole possession of first place when Johnny Pesky scores on a disputed squeeze play. The Sox rally from a 6–3 deficit by scoring four runs in the eighth. The winning run scores when Bobby Doerr drops a surprise squeeze bunt in front of Tommy Henrich, playing first base, and Pesky slides under the catcher's tag at home plate. Umpire Bill Grieve calls Pesky safe, and Casey Stengel is fined for a post-game confrontation with the ump. Now ahead by one game, the Sox depart for a three-game set in Washington before going back to New York for a final two-game showdown against the Yankees.
- September 27:
  - The Boston Red Sox, winners of 16 out of the last 19 with the Senators, take the opener at Griffith Stadium 6–4, maintaining a one game lead on the Yankees, who also won their game, as Vic Raschi won his 20th game of the season, defeating the Athletics, 3–1.
  - The Cardinals fall to the Pirates, 6–4, cutting their lead over the idle Dodgers to 1 game.
- September 28:
  - Facing Ray Scarborough, the Senators' top pitcher, the Boston Red Sox take a 1–0 lead into the ninth inning only to have the Senators tie it up. Mel Parnell, in relief for Boston, bounces a curve ball wild pitch past catcher Birdie Tebbetts, and the winning run scores from third base.
  - The New York Yankees, taking two out of three games from the Philadelphia Athletics with a seesaw battle against the A's, 7–5, stay one game behind the Boston Red Sox with two games left. Joe DiMaggio, down 18 pounds from his bout with pneumonia, takes batting practice for the Yankees.
  - Called up from Triple-A Toronto in mid-September, outfielder Ed Sanicki of the Philadelphia Phillies gets his third hit of the season. All three are home runs. On September 14, Sanicki had homered with two men on his first big-league at bat, against Rip Sewell of the Pittsburgh Pirates.
- September 29 – The St. Louis Cardinals lose 7–2 to former Redbird Murry Dickson, now with the Pittsburgh Pirates, following a Red Munger defeat. It is Dickson's 5th win of the season against his former team. Meanwhile, the Dodgers sweep a doubleheader against the Braves, 9–2 and 8–0, moving them ahead of the Cardinals by a 1/2 game in the National League.
- September 30:
  - The Boston Red Sox outlast the Washington Senators 11–9 to move into New York for the showdown for the AL pennant, as the Yankees are defeated by Dick Fowler and the A's, 4–1. Aided by 14 walks, the Sox win the game despite being outhit by the Senators, 18–5.
  - Ralph Kiner hits his 54th home run, his 16th in September, as the Pittsburgh Pirates beat Herm Wehmeier and the Cincinnati Reds 3–2. Kiner's monthly total eclipses Cy Williams' 1923 NL mark.

=== October ===
- October 1:
  - Needing to win just one of their final two games at Yankee Stadium to clinch the American League pennant, the Boston Red Sox squander a 4–0 lead and fall to the Yankees, 5–4. Joe DiMaggio, who returns to the Bombers' lineup today after his weeks-long bout with pneumonia, scores the home side's first run of the game and Johnny Lindell's home run provides the winning margin. The Yankees and Red Sox are deadlocked atop the American League, with a winner-take-all showdown set for tomorrow's final day of the season.
  - The Brooklyn Dodgers, now ahead by a game in the National League, lose to the Philadelphia Phillies, 6–4. The St. Louis Cardinals, however, lose to the Chicago Cubs, 3–1, preserving the Dodgers' one-game lead.
  - Southpaw Alex Kellner become the first 20-game winner for the Philadelphia Athletics since Lefty Grove in 1933. However, Kellner will suffer a reversal of fortunes the next season and lose 20 games.
  - The Pittsburgh Pirates cut ties with two veterans, pitcher Rip Sewell, 42, and outfielder Dixie Walker, 39. Sewell won 143 games in a Pirate uniform from 1939 through 1949, and made three NL All-Star teams. Walker is best known as a Dodger (1939–1947), where he was an NL All-Star four times and won the NL batting crown in 1944. Both men will continue their baseball careers as minor-league managers.
- October 2:
  - A crowd of 70,000 sees the host New York Yankees and Boston Red Sox square off on the final day of the season with the American League pennant hanging in the balance. Phil Rizzuto scores the game's first run after tripling in the first. Vic Raschi nurses the 1–0 lead and duels Ellis Kinder into the eighth inning, when the Yankees bust out and plate four runs off relievers Mel Parnell and Tex Hughson. The Red Sox rally for three in the ninth, but it's not enough: the Yankees win the game, 5–3, their 16th pennant since 1921, and first of ten that manager Casey Stengel will oversee through 1960. Ted Williams is hitless in two official at-bats. He goes one for 12 over the final four games of the season, enabling George Kell of the Detroit Tigers to edge Williams for the batting title, .3429 to .3427.
  - The National League pennant is also on the line, although in two different games. At Shibe Park, the Philadelphia Phillies shell Don Newcombe and Rex Barney and tie the Brooklyn Dodgers, 7–7, in the sixth. After the game heads to extra innings, the Dodgers score two runs in the top of the tenth on singles by Duke Snider and Luis Olmo, then Jack Banta completes a 41/3-inning shutout relief performance, to win, 9–7. Brooklyn preserves its one-game lead over the runner-up St. Louis Cardinals, who also triumph today, 13–5 over the Chicago Cubs at Wrigley Field. It's the Dodgers' eighth NL title since 1890.
- October 4 – Off-the-field, the Dodgers continue to deal away minor-league assets, sending Triple-A Montreal outfielder Sam Jethroe, along with Bob Addis, to the Boston Braves for three marginal players. Days earlier, Brooklyn had sold Triple-A Hollywood outfielder Irv Noren to the Washington Senators for $50,000, and sent third base prospect Danny O'Connell to the Pittsburgh Pirates for $50,000 and a minor-league infielder. Jethroe, Noren and O'Connell will go on to noteworthy MLB careers.
- October 5 – The World Series gets underway at Yankee Stadium. The New York Yankees and Allie Reynolds defeat the Brooklyn Dodgers, 1–0, on Tommy Henrich's home run in the bottom of the ninth off Don Newcombe. Newcombe had struck out 11 and walked none before Henrich's blast. Henrich's shot is the first game-ending home run in World Series history.
- October 6 – The visiting Dodgers even the Series in Game 2 with a 1–0 win behind Preacher Roe. Gil Hodges' single in the second drives in Jackie Robinson for the game's only run.
- October 7:
  - "Organized Baseball" reaches a settlement with Danny Gardella, the defiant former New York Giant outfielder who was the first U.S. player to "jump" to the Mexican League in 1946, was suspended for five years, then sued in federal court to have the reserve clause overturned in October 1947. Today, Gardella agrees to drop that suit in exchange for a cash payment, and is signed by the St. Louis Cardinals as a free agent. He will appear in one game for the 1950 Cardinals before going to the minor leagues.
  - With both the Series and game deadlocked at 1–1, the Yankees score three runs in the top of the ninth inning at Ebbets Field. The Dodgers answer with two in the bottom of the frame, but the Yankees hold on to win, 4–3, and take a 2–1 lead in the 1949 World Series. Tomorrow, the Bombers will increase their Fall Classic advantage to three games to one, by taking Game 4, 6–4.
- October 9 – The New York Yankees defeat the Brooklyn Dodgers, 10–6, in Game 5 of the World Series, sweeping all three games played at Ebbets Field and winning their 12th world championship, four games to one. It's the second time in three years that the Yankees have bested the Dodgers in the Fall Classic, and represents the first of an unprecedented five straight World Series titles for the "Bronx Bombers". Relief ace Joe Page wins the inaugural Babe Ruth Award as the Most Valuable Player for the Series.
- October 13 – The Oakland Oaks of the Pacific Coast League sell the contracts of two young players, second baseman Billy Martin, 21, and outfielder Jackie Jensen, 22, to the New York Yankees; the Oaks also get a "player to be named later", catcher Eddie Malone. The fiery Martin will become a Yankee legend as a player and manager; Jensen, a future (1958) AL Most Valuable Player and three-time RBI champ, will find stardom after he's traded away in May 1952.
- October 19:
  - Three weeks after acquiring Venezuelan shortstop Alfonso "Chico" Carrasquel from the Brooklyn Dodgers' organization for two minor leaguers and cash consideration‚ the Chicago White Sox steal second baseman Nellie Fox from the Philadelphia Athletics in exchange for backup catcher Joe Tipton. For the next six seasons, Carrasquel and Fox will form the ChiSox' double play combination and the team regains its winning ways in 1951.
  - Bucky Harris becomes the first manager to be hired a third time by the same team when he succeeds Joe Kuhel as skipper of the Washington Senators. Harris, 52, previously helmed the Senators from 1924–1928 (winning the 1924 World Series and 1925 AL pennant) and 1935–1942. More recently, Harris had won a World Series (1947) and finished third with a 94–60 record (1948) as pilot of the New York Yankees. Under Kuhel, Washington plummeted into last place in the Junior Circuit in 1949, losing 104 games.
- October 23 – Luke Sewell, who served as acting manager of the Cincinnati Reds for the last three games of the 1949 season when Bucky Walters was released, is named Cincinnati's full-fledged skipper for 1950. A former standout American League catcher, Sewell, 48, is known as the man who managed the 1944 St. Louis Browns to the only AL pennant they have ever won in their history.
- October 26 – After his disgruntled players had voted skipper Billy Southworth, a future Hall-of-Fame manager, only a half-share of the Boston Braves' fourth-place World Series money, Commissioner Happy Chandler steps in to restore Southworth's full amount due. Suffering from stress and rumored to be battling a drinking problem, Southworth took a leave of absence for the last 45 games of the 1949 season. He will return to the Braves' helm in 1950.

=== November ===
- November 18 – Brooklyn Dodgers infielder Jackie Robinson, who hit 16 home runs with 124 RBI and led the National League with a .342 batting average, becomes the first African American to win the Most Valuable Player Award. Stan Musial, Ralph Kiner, and teammate Pee Wee Reese are the runners-up.
- November 21 – Bill Veeck sells the Cleveland Indians for $2.2 million to a local syndicate headed by Ellis Ryan. Hank Greenberg will be the new general manager.
- November 25 – Boston Red Sox left fielder Ted Williams, who lost the Triple Crown when his batting average was .0002 below that of George Kell, wins the American League MVP Award with 13 of 22 first place votes, with the rest of the votes going to Phil Rizzuto (5), Joe Page (3) and Mel Parnell (1).
- November 26 – In Japanese baseball, the Central League is joined by the Pacific League.

=== December ===
- December 1 – Attendance in major league parks drops by 24% to 20.2 million fans in 1949, down from 20.9 million in 1948. The New York Yankees (2.28 million) and Cleveland Indians (2.23 million) lead the way, but the St. Louis Browns fall to 270,396, 16th and last in MLB.
- December 6 – The New York Yankees release outfielder Charlie Keller, 33, a five-time American League All-Star and 5x World Series champion during his 11 years in pinstripes. Keller will sign with the Detroit Tigers as a free agent on December 28.
- December 13 – Seeking to add talent to a winning, 81–73 team and give 86-year-old manager Connie Mack "one last pennant" in his 50th year at the helm, the Philadelphia Athletics send third baseman Frankie Gustine, shortstop Billy DeMars, outfielder Ray Coleman, a minor leaguer, and an astronomical (for them) $100,000 to the St. Louis Browns for All-Star third baseman Bob Dillinger and outfielder Paul Lehner. Dillinger is a .309 lifetime hitter and three-time AL stolen base champion, but his indifferent defense has tarnished his reputation. His stay in Philadelphia will last only 84 games in 1950 before he's waived, and his acquisition will be deemed an expensive blunder.
- December 14:
  - After prolonged rumors and denials, the New York Giants make a momentous trade with the Boston Braves, acquiring shortstop and 1948 National League Rookie of the Year Alvin Dark, 27, and sparkplug veteran second baseman Eddie Stanky, 34, from Boston for pitcher Red Webb, shortstop Buddy Kerr, and hard-hitting outfielders Sid Gordon and Willard Marshall. Dark and Stanky are both critics of the Braves' veteran manager, Billy Southworth; but, while the trade is first seen as an "impulsive mistake" on the part of the Giants, the two infielders will contribute to their first-division finish in 1950 and NL pennant in 1951. The Braves, meanwhile, are stripped of their double-play combination, and only Gordon contributes meaningfully to their early 1950s teams.
  - The Chicago White Sox trade relief specialist Ed Klieman to the Philadelphia Athletics for third baseman Hank Majeski. Klieman led the American League in saves in 1947 with 17 as a member of the Cleveland Indians.
  - The St. Louis Cardinals reacquire outfielder and former National League batting champ Harry Walker, most recently with the Cincinnati Reds, for second baseman Lou Klein (just returned from Mexican League exile and subsequent suspension) and outfielder Ron Northey.
  - The Detroit Tigers send right-hander Lou Kretlow and $100,000 to the St. Louis Browns for second baseman Jerry Priddy. The following day, the Browns claim left-hander Stubby Overmire on waivers from the Tigers.
  - The Boston Braves trade pitcher Bill Voiselle to the Chicago Cubs for infielder Gene Mauch.
- December 17 – The New York Yankees acquire outfielder Dick Wakefield, an erstwhile American League All-Star, from the Detroit Tigers for first baseman Dick Kryhoski.
- December 24 – Making a deal on Christmas Eve, the Boston Braves trade outfielders Jim Russell and Ed Sauer, plus cash, to the Brooklyn Dodgers for outfielder Luis Olmo.

== Movies ==
- Take Me Out to the Ball Game
- The Stratton Story
- It Happens Every Spring
- The Kid from Cleveland

== Births ==
=== January ===
- January 3:
  - Ike Brookens
  - Gary Lavelle
- January 4 – Dennis Saunders
- January 8 – Wilbur Howard
- January 13:
  - Mike Buskey
  - Jim Foor
- January 15:
  - Luis Alvarado
  - Bobby Grich
- January 19 – Ramón de los Santos
- January 22 – Mike Caldwell
- January 29 – Jim Tyrone
- January 31:
  - Mark Ballinger
  - Fred Kendall
  - Jim Willoughby

=== February ===
- February 3 – Bake McBride
- February 4 – Steve Brye
- February 6 – Richie Zisk
- February 9:
  - John Andrews
  - John Young
- February 11 – Ben Oglivie
- February 12:
  - Ray Corbin
  - Enzo Hernández
  - Lenny Randle
- February 14 – Larry Fritz
- February 16 – Bob Didier
- February 18:
  - John Mayberry
  - Jerry Morales
- February 27 – John Wockenfuss
- February 28 – Jim Kremmel

=== March ===
- March 3 – Jesse Jefferson
- March 8 – Juan Jiménez
- March 13 – Dennis O'Toole
- March 15 – Jim Kern
- March 21 – Don Durham
- March 22 – Terry Wilshusen
- March 23 – Jim Geddes
- March 26 – Roger Hambright
- March 28 – Frank Snook
- March 30 – Terry Cox

=== April ===
- April 8 – Mac Scarce
- April 9 – Sam Ewing
- April 10:
  - Tom Lundstedt
  - Pete Varney
- April 15 – Ray Bare
- April 23 – Bob O'Brien
- April 26 – Bruce Ellingsen
- April 27 – Greg Kosc
- April 30 – Phil Garner

=== May ===
- May 2 – Steve Grilli
- May 4 – Pat Osburn
- May 11 – Jerry Martin
- May 13 – Terry Hughes
- May 15 – Steve Dunning
- May 16 – Rick Reuschel
- May 18 – Chris Ward
- May 22 – Mike Eden
- May 26 – Ed Crosby
- May 27 – Terry Collins

=== June ===
- June 2 – Jack Pierce
- June 6 – Jim Deidel
- June 15 – Dusty Baker
- June 16 – Bob Rauch
- June 17 – Brian Ostrosser
- June 18 – Dave Schneck
- June 19 – Jerry Reuss
- June 22:
  - Ron Hodges
  - Dave Tomlin
- June 23 – Dave Goltz
- June 28 – Don Baylor

=== July ===
- July 7 – Tim Nordbrook
- July 9 – Steve Luebber
- July 11:
  - Jack Heidemann
  - Stan Thomas
- July 17 – Herb Hutson
- July 19 – Gene Locklear
- July 21 – Al Hrabosky
- July 22 – Tim Johnson
- July 25 – Santiago Guzmán
- July 26 – David Vincent
- July 28 – Vida Blue
- July 31 – Jay Schlueter

=== August ===
- August 4 – Terry Humphrey
- August 6 – Mike Reinbach
- August 9 – Ted Simmons
- August 10:
  - Tom Brown
  - Jimmy McMath
- August 11 – Luis Meléndez
- August 13 – Andre Thornton
- August 18 – Charlie Hudson
- August 19 – Paul Mitchell
- August 22 – Doug Bair
- August 25 – Bob Babcock

=== September ===
- September 1:
  - Gary Ignasiak
  - Garry Maddox
- September 4 – Paul Jata
- September 6 – Mike Thompson
- September 9 – Reggie Sanders
- September 13:
  - Rick Dempsey
  - Jim Obradovich
- September 15:
  - Don Carrithers
  - Dave Pagan
- September 16:
  - Mike Garman
  - Roger Moret
- September 24 – Don Kirkwood
- September 27 – Mike Schmidt
- September 28 – Mario Guerrero
- September 29 – Steve Busby
- September 30 – Ike Blessitt

=== October ===
- October 2 – Greg Pryor
- October 3:
  - Jim Breazeale
  - Steve Foucault
- October 4 – John Wathan
- October 5 – Danny Fife
- October 8 – Enos Cabell
- October 9 – Steve Palermo
- October 10:
  - Larry Lintz
  - Rob Sperring
- October 11 – Bobby Jones
- October 16 – Don Hood
- October 18:
  - Ed Farmer
  - George Hendrick
- October 21 – Skip James
- October 23 – Greg Thayer
- October 26:
  - Mike Hargrove
  - Steve Rogers
- October 27 – Jim Burton

=== November ===
- November 16 – Leon Brown
- November 20 – Ron Cash
- November 22 – Rich Chiles
- November 28 – Dave Augustine

=== December ===
- December 2 – Jay Kleven
- December 11 – Craig Caskey
- December 14 – Bill Buckner
- December 20:
  - Cecil Cooper
  - Oscar Gamble
- December 21 – Larry Bradford
- December 24 – Frank Taveras
- December 27 – Chico Escárrega
- December 28 – John Milner

== Deaths ==
=== January ===
- January 1 – Hans Rasmussen, 53, pitcher who played for the Chicago Whales during the 1915 season.
- January 4 – Joe Evers, 57, pinch-runner who appeared in just one game for the 1913 New York Giants.
- January 9 – Harry McIntire, 69, pitcher who played from 1905 through 13 for the Brooklyn Superbas, Chicago Cubs and Cincinnati Reds, who posted a 13-9 record with a 3.07 ERA and 10 complete games in 1910, to help Chicago win the 1910 National League pennant.
- January 21 – Russ Ennis, 51, catcher who played for the Washington Senators in the 1926 season.
- January 23 – Walt Herrell, 69, pitcher for the 1911 Washington Senators.
- January 26 − Hugh Bradley, 63, first baseman who played for the Boston Red Sox, Pittsburgh Rebels, Brooklyn Tip-Tops and Newark Pepper in a span of four seasons from 1910 to 1915, including the 1912 World Champion Red Sox.
- January 28 – Frank Naleway, 46, shortstop who played with the Chicago White Sox in 1924.

=== February ===
- February 4 – Pat Martin, 54, pitcher who played for the Philadelphia Athletics in the 1920 season.
- February 8 – John Carden, 27, pitcher for the 1946 New York Giants.
- February 10 – Johnny Bates, 66, outfielder who played from 1906 to 1914 for the Boston Beaneaters, Boston Doves, Philadelphia Phillies, Cincinnati Reds, Chicago Cubs and Baltimore Terrapins, as well is a member of the select list of players who hit a home run in their first MLB at bat.
- February 15 – Tommy Raub, 78, backup catcher who played for the Chicago Cubs and St. Louis Cardinals in part of two seasons spanning 1903–1906.
- February 18 – Marty O'Toole, 60, pitcher who played with the Cincinnati Reds, Pittsburgh Pirates and New York Giants in a span of five seasons from 1908 to 1914.
- February 20 – Norm Baker, 85, who pitched for the Pittsburgh Alleghenys, Louisville Colonels and Baltimore Orioles of the National League in three seasons between 1883 and 1890.
- February 24 – Ted Scheffler, 84, outfielder who played in 1888 with the Detroit Wolverines and for the Rochester Broncos in 1890.

=== March ===
- March 11 – Eric McNair, 39, shortstop who played with the Philadelphia Athletics, Boston Red Sox, Chicago White Sox and Detroit Tigers during 14 seasons from 1929 to 1942, was a member of the 1930 World Series champion Athletics, led the American League in doubles with 47 in 1932, and also was a member of a 1934 All-American team that toured China, Japan and the Philippines, playing against teams in those countries.
- March 15 – Bill Cissell, 45, middle infielder who played for the Chicago White Sox, Cleveland Indians, Boston Red Sox, Philadelphia Athletics and New York Giants during 10 seasons spanning 1928–1938.
- March 18 – Rudy Sommers, 61, pitcher who played for the Chicago Cubs, Brooklyn Tip-Tops and Boston Red Sox over four seasons between 1912 and 1927.
- March 19 – Truck Eagan, 71, part-time infielder for the Pittsburgh Pirates and Cleveland Blues in the 1901 season.
- March 22 – Jake Livingstone, 69, Russian pitcher who played in 1901 with the New York Giants.
- March 25 – Jim Riley, 62, outfielder who appeared in just one game with the Boston Doves in 1910.
- March 26 – Mike Jacobs, 72, shortstop who played five games for the Chicago Orphans in 1902.
- March 27 – Frank Gleich, 55, backup outfielder for the 1919–1920 New York Yankees
- March 30 – Bill Bernhard, 78, one of the first pitchers to jump from the National League to the American League, who posted a combined record of 116–82 with a 3.04 earned run average in 231 games for the Philadelphia Phillies, Philadelphia Athletics and the Cleveland Bronchos/Naps from 1899 to 1907, including 23 wins and a 2.13 ERA for Cleveland in the 1904 season.

=== April ===
- April 4 – George Suggs, 66, pitcher whose career spanned from 1908 through 1915, compiling a 99–91 record with a 3.11 ERA in 245 games with the Detroit Tigers, Cincinnati Reds and Baltimore Terrapins, including 20 wins in 1910 and 24 in 1914.
- April 6 – Gene Madden, 59, who appeared as a pinch-hitter in one game for the Pittsburgh Pirates in 1916.
- April 11 – Joe Buskey, 46, shortstop for the 1926 Philadelphia Phillies.
- April 20 – John Murphy, 69, backup infielder who played from 1902 to 1903 for the St. Louis Cardinals and Detroit Tigers.
- April 21 – Harry Morelock, 79, shortstop for the Philadelphia Phillies in the 1891 and 1892 seasons.
- April 28 – Clay Touchstone, 46, pitcher who played for the Boston Braves and Chicago White Sox over parts of three seasons between 1928 and 1945.

=== May ===
- May 6:
  - Charlie Hallstrom, 85, one of four big leaguers to have been born in Sweden. who pitched in just one game for the Providence Grays during the 1885 National League season.
  - Speed Kelly, 64, third baseman who played for the Washington Senators in 1909.
- May 7 – James Durham, 67, pitcher for the Chicago White Sox in 1902.
- May 8 – Sam Breadon, 72, owner of the St. Louis Cardinals from 1920 to 1947.
- May 14 – Mike Kahoe, 75, one of the first catchers to wear shin guards, who played for the Cincinnati Reds, Chicago Orphans, St. Louis Browns, Philadelphia Phillies, Chicago Cubs and Washington Senators in 10 seasons from 1895 to 1909.
- May 17 – Bill Swarback, 81, for the 1887 New York Giants.
- May 24 – Joe Callahan, 32, pitcher who played for the Boston Bees in the 1939 to 1940 seasons.
- May 27 – Jim Canavan, 82, who played some outfield and infield utility positions with the Cincinnati Kelly's Killers, Milwaukee Brewers, Chicago Colts, Cincinnati Reds and Brooklyn Bridegrooms in a span of five seasons from 1891 to 1897.
- May 29 – Doc Scanlan, 68, who pitched with the Pittsburgh Pirates and Brooklyn Superbas/Dodgers during seven seasons between 1903 and 1911.

=== June ===
- June 7 – Hi Bell, 51, pitcher who played for the St. Louis Cardinals and New York Giants in a span of eight seasons from 1924 to 1934, as well as a member of the Cardinals teams that won the World Series in 1926 and 1933 and the National League pennant in 1930.
- June 11 – R. R. M. Carpenter, 71, co-owner (with his son) of the Philadelphia Phillies from November 23, 1943 until his death.
- June 12 – Oliver Marcell, 53, African-American third baseman for a number of teams around the Negro leagues from 1918 through 1931, also a top-class hitter whose defensive skills took center stage by comparison.
- June 14 – Charley Moran, 71, who gained renown as both a catcher and umpire in Major League Baseball and as a collegiate and professional American football coach, while playing for the St. Louis Cardinals, umpiring in the National League from 1918 to 1939, working in four World Series, and coaching football at several colleges.
- June 15:
  - Nig Clarke, 66, Canadian catcher who played with the Detroit Tigers, Cleveland Naps, St. Louis Browns, Philadelphia Phillies and Pittsburgh Pirates over part of nine seasons between 1905 and 1920.
  - Jim Buchanan, pitcher for the 1905 St. Louis Browns of the American League.
- June 16 – Jim Cook, 69, outfielder who played with the Chicago Cubs in the 1903 season.
- June 16 – Jerry Kane, 87, backup catcher for the 1890 St. Louis Browns of the National League.
- June 23 – John Godar, 84, outfielder for the 1892 Baltimore Orioles of the National League.
- June 25 – Buck Freeman, 77, outfielder for the Washington Statesmen/Senators, Boston Beaneaters and Boston Americans in 10 seasons between 1891 and 1907, who led both the National League and American League in home runs, twice topped the American League in RBI, batted a .300 average four times, and was a member of the 1903 World Champion Boston Americans.

=== July ===
- July 6 – Ike Caveney, 54, shortstop who played with the Cincinnati Reds from 1922 to 1925, and later became a player-manager for the PCL San Francisco Seals from 1932 to 1934.
- July 10 – Red Downey, 60, outfielder for the 1909 Brooklyn Superbas of the National League.
- July 17 – Jack Slattery, 71, backup catcher who played for the Boston Americans, Cleveland Naps, Chicago White Sox, St. Louis Cardinals and Washington Senators in parts of four seasons from 1901 to 1909, and later managed the Boston Braves in 1928.
- July 23 – John Anderson, 75, outfielder and first baseman and the first of only three big leaguers to have been born in Norway, who played for six teams in a 14 season-career between 1894 and 1908, slashing .290/.329/.405 through 1,636 games, while leading the National League with 22 triples and a .494 slugging average in 1898 and the American League with 39 stolen bases in 1906.

=== August ===
- August 22 – Chief Zimmer, 88, catcher for 19 seasons, 13 with the Cleveland Spiders, batted .300 four times.
- August 25 – Mule Watson, 52, who pitched from 1918 through 1924 for the Philadelphia Athletics, Boston Braves, Pittsburgh Pirates and New York Giants, as well as the last pitcher in Major League Baseball history to start both games of a doubleheader twice in the same season.

=== September ===
- September 1 – Larry McClure, 64, outfielder for the 1910 New York Highlanders.
- September 9:
  - Len Madden, 59, pitcher for the 1912 Chicago Cubs.
  - Hal Neubauer, 47, pitcher who played for the 1925 Boston Red Sox.
- September 12 – Sherry Smith, 58, pitcher for the Pittsburgh Pirates, Brooklyn Robins and Cleveland Indians in a span of 14 season from 1911 to 1927, who is best known as the hard-luck loser in a pitching duel against Babe Ruth of the Boston Red Sox in the longest World Series game ever played — 14 innings in 1916 — when gave up an-out, RBI-single to Del Gainer that allowed Mike McNally to score the winning run in the eventual 2-1 loss.
- September 13 – Tim Jordan, 70, first baseman for the Washington Senators, New York Highlanders and Brooklyn Superbas over parts of ten seasons from 1901 to 1910, who led the National League in home runs in 1906 and 1908.
- September 14 – Billy Martin, 75, shortstop for the Boston Braves in the 1914 season.
- September 15:
  - Heinie Beckendorf, 65, catcher who played with the Detroit Tigers from 1909 to 1910 and for the Washington Senators in 1910.
  - Tiny Bonham, 36, All-Star pitcher who played for the New York Yankees and Pittsburgh Pirates during 10 seasons between 1940 and 1949; member of Yankees teams that won World Series titles in 1941 and 1943; died following an appendectomy, just 18 days after his final pitching performance, an 8–2 win over the Philadelphia Phillies.
- September 18:
  - Roger Denzer, 77, pitcher who played with the Chicago Colts in 1897 and for the New York Giants in 1901.
  - Charlie Malay, 70, second baseman for the 1905 Brooklyn Superbas.
- September 21 – Buck Danner, 58, shortstop who played for the Philadelphia Athletics during the 1915 season.
- September 22 – Matty Fitzgerald, 69, catcher who played from 1906 to 1907 for the New York Giants.

=== October ===
- October 1 – Eddie Kolb, 69, pitcher whose only appearance in the majors was in the last game of the Cleveland Spiders in its 1899 season.
- October 2 – Frank Schulte, 67, slugging right fielder for the Chicago Cubs teams from 1904 to 1916, who earned the first National League MVP Award in 1911, led the league in home runs twice and stole 233 bases in his career, including home plate 22 times.
- October 3 – John Donahue, 55, right fielder for the 1923 Boston Red Sox.
- October 6:
  - Robert E. Hannegan, 46, St. Louis political figure and former U.S. Postmaster General who was co-owner of the Cardinals (with Fred Saigh) from November 1947 to January 1949.
  - Guy Zinn, 62, outfielder who played from 1911 through 1915 for the New York Highlanders, Boston Braves and Baltimore Terrapins.
- October 14 – Huyler Westervelt, 80, 19th century pitcher who played for the New York Giants in 1894.
- October 16 – Jack Ryan, 65, pitcher who played for the Cleveland Naps, Boston Red Sox and Brooklyn Dodgers during three seasons spanning 1908–1911, later a longtime pitching coach for the Red Sox.
- October 19 – Bill Steele, 63, pitcher for the St. Louis Cardinals in five seasons from 1910 to 1914.
- October 20 – Dick Rudolph, 62, spitball pitcher who played for the New York Giants and Boston Braves over 13 seasons from 1910 to 1927, posting a 121–108 career record with a 2.66 ERA, including two 20-win seasons and a World Series ring with the 1914 Miracle Braves – the first MLB club ever to win a World Series in just four games – while pitching complete-game victories in Games 1 and 4.
- October 23 – Bill Burdick, 90, 19th century pitcher who played from 1888 to 1889 for the Indianapolis Hoosiers.
- October 25 – Tim Bowden, 58, outfielder for the 1914 St. Louis Browns.
- October 26 – Lou Mahaffey, 75, 19th century pitcher for Louisville Colonels of the National League in 1898, who later player for several minor league teams before joining the Pacific Coast League as an umpire in 1906.
- October 29 – John Malarkey, 77, pitcher for the Washington Senators, Chicago Orphans and Boston Beaneaters of the National League over six seasons spanning 1894–1903, who is recognized as the only pitcher in MLB history to earn a victory by hitting his own walk-off home run, a solo shot against St. Louis Cardinals pitcher Mike O'Neill in the bottom of the 11th inning to give the Beaneaters a 4–3 victory on September 10, 1902 at Boston's South End Grounds.
- October 31 – Jack Lundbom, 72, pitcher for the 1902 Cleveland Bronchos.

=== November ===
- November 4 – Larry Douglas, pitcher who played in 1915 for the Baltimore Terrapins of the outlaw Federal League.
- November 6 – Bill Richardson, 71, first baseman for the 1901 St. Louis Cardinals.
- November 11 – Brick Owens, 64, American League umpire from 1916 to 1937, who officiated in five World Series and the 1934 MLB All-Star Game.
- November 14 – Artie Clarke, 89, utilityman whose main position was catcher, who appeared in 149 games for the New York Giants in the 1890 the 1891 seasons.
- November 17 – Fred Hoey, 65, sportswriter and pioneering baseball broadcaster in Boston; radio voice of both the Braves (1925–1938) and Red Sox (1927–1938).
- November 22 – Erv Brame, 48, good-hitting pitcher who posted a 52–37 won–lost mark from 1928 through 1932 for the Pittsburgh Pirates; batted .306 in 396 career at bats, with eight home runs and 75 RBI, and was frequently asked to pinch hit.
- November 28 – Art Kruger, 68, backup outfielder who played with four teams in all or part of four seasons between 1907 and 1915, most prominently for the Kansas City Packers of the Federal League from 1914 to 1915.

=== December ===
- December 1 – Hanson Horsey, 60, pitcher who played for the Cincinnati Reds in the 1912 season.
- December 3 – Pete LePine, 73, Canadian outfielder and first baseman who appeared in 30 games for the Detroit Tigers in 1902.
- December 13 – Orth Collins, 69, outfielder and pitcher who played with the New York Highlanders in the 1904 season and for the Washington Senators in 1909.
- December 15 – Frank Hershey, 72, pitcher who appeared in just one game for the Boston Beaneaters in the 1905 season.
- December 16 – Jack Himes, 71, outfielder who played for the St. Louis Cardinals in the 1905 and 1906 seasons.
- December 19 – Robert Gibson, 80, pitcher for the Chicago Colts and Pittsburgh Alleghenys during the 1890 National League season, who later became a federal judge.
- December 21 – Teddy Kearns, 49, backup infielder who played with the Philadelphia Athletics in the 1920 season and for the Chicago Cubs from 1924 to 1925.
- December 30 – Doc Watson, 64, pitcher who played with the Chicago Cubs in 1913 before joining the Chicago Chi-Feds and St. Louis Terriers clubs of the Federal League from 1914 to 1915.
