= Tough Call =

1948 painting by Norman Rockwell

Tough Call (Game Called Because of Rain)
- Artist: Norman Rockwell
- Year: 1948
- Medium: Oil on canvas
- Dimensions: 109 cm × 104 cm (43 in × 41 in)
- Location: National Baseball Hall of Fame

Tough Call – also known as Game Called Because of Rain, Bottom of the Sixth, or The Three Umpires – is a 1948 painting by American artist Norman Rockwell, painted for the April 23, 1949, cover of The Saturday Evening Post magazine. The original painting is in the collection of the National Baseball Hall of Fame. It is considered the best known of Rockwell's baseball-themed works, and appears in at least ten Rockwell commentary books.

The painting is set at a ballpark, where a group of three baseball umpires is looking skyward, as rain is starting to fall. Behind them is a scoreboard showing the game to be in the bottom of the 6th inning, with the Pittsburgh Pirates leading the Brooklyn Dodgers by a score of 1–0. Also shown is a Brooklyn coach or manager in conversation with his Pittsburgh counterpart.

== Creation ==
During the 1948 season, Rockwell visited Ebbets Field, home ballpark of the Dodgers, with a photographer. The photographer took pictures of the umpires, some players, and the ballpark, which Rockwell used for reference in painting a Post cover image that he completed in California that winter. While in California, Rockwell also visited Ralph Kiner, to view his Pirates uniform for additional reference.

Two reference photographs feature a lineup that the Dodgers used only on September 13, against the Chicago Cubs:

No.	Pos.	Player
35	LF	Marv Rackley
42	2B	Jackie Robinson
1	SS	Pee Wee Reese
7	3B	Pete Reiser
6	CF	Carl Furillo
10	C	Bruce Edwards
14	1B	Gil Hodges
22	RF	Gene Hermanski
26	P	Rex Barney

Reiser, normally an outfielder, played only four games at third base during the season, and only on September 13 was Barney also the pitcher. Other reference photographs show the three umpires who worked a doubleheader between the Dodgers and Pirates on September 14. The scoreboard also lists an upcoming Wednesday doubleheader against the Cincinnati Reds, which was played on September 15.

The above are all consistent with the reference photographs being taken on September 14, before the first game of the Pirates doubleheader, with the scoreboard still displaying the Dodgers' lineup from their prior game against the Cubs.

An early version of the painting was found in 2017, and was sold for $1.68 million.

== Composition ==
The painting features five people, standing from left to right, who each posed for reference photographs;

- base umpire Larry Goetz
- home plate umpire Beans Reardon, holding his outside chest protector
- base umpire Lou Jorda
- Brooklyn coach Clyde Sukeforth, holding his hat and largely obscured by the umpires
- Pittsburgh manager Billy Meyer

Three Pittsburgh fielders are visible in the distance. While lacking reference photographs, they are identified, standing from left to right, as;

- second baseman Danny Murtaugh, with arms akimbo
- center fielder Johnny Hopp
- right fielder Dixie Walker

On the scoreboard, part of the Brooklyn batting order can be seen, and number 20 is listed as being at bat, while the line score shows just a single run in the game, scored by Pittsburgh in the top of the 2nd inning.

Not all details of the painting match actual game events of September 14, such as;

- Pittsburgh did not have a 1–0 lead in either game of the doubleheader
- Johnny Hopp played first base in both games
- no Brooklyn player wearing number 20 played that day

== Reception ==
The cover image was well received by the public. It has been the subject of confusion, however, and it caused some controversy between Rockwell and the Post.

The source of confusion is the depiction of Sukeforth and Meyer, and the score, which has Pittsburgh leading. If the game is ended by the umpires due to rain, Pittsburgh will win, given that they have the lead with five innings already completed. If so, why does Sukeforth (Brooklyn coach) look happy, while Meyer (Pittsburgh manager) appears unhappy? The Post provided an explanation for their readers;

In the picture, Clyde Sukeforth, a Brooklyn coach, could well be saying, 'You may be all wet, but it ain't raining a drop!' The huddled Pittsburgher—Bill Meyer, Pirate manager—is doubtless retorting, 'For the love of Abner Doubleday, how can we play ball in this cloudburst?'

1982 postage stamp

Other explanations are also possible; since the manually operated scoreboard at Ebbets Field was only updated after each team had batted, it's possible that Brooklyn is actually leading (due to scoring two or more runs in the bottom of the 6th inning), yet the score hasn't been updated yet. Ultimately, the painting is open to interpretation as "a fictional creation intended to do nothing other than elicit emotions of the moment, leaving the viewer to extrapolate various scenarios."

The source of controversy was changes the Post made to the image, without Rockwell's consent. The Post used an artist to adjust illustrations prior to publication; for example, to remove brand names. That artist adjusted Rockwell's original image to lighten the sky, and also darken the Pirates' uniforms. This upset Rockwell, who complained that the Post "had the piece of sky added when I still feel it was better as I conceived and painted it" in a letter to their art editor. After a total of four Rockwell paintings were adjusted by the Post in 1948 and 1949, Rockwell's objections resulted in the Post changing its policy.

== In popular culture ==
The painting has been widely reproduced on numerous souvenir items, and was featured on a postage stamp issued by the Turks and Caicos Islands in 1982. In 2008, the image was shown on the television series The Bronx Is Burning, allegedly without permission, which resulted in a lawsuit against ESPN.
