= 1949 Brooklyn Dodgers season =

Major League Baseball season

1949 Brooklyn Dodgers
- National League champions
- League: National League
- Ballpark: Ebbets Field
- City: Brooklyn, New York
- Record: 97–57 (.630)
- League place: 1st
- Owners: James & Dearie Mulvey, Walter O'Malley, Branch Rickey, John L. Smith
- President: Branch Rickey
- Managers: Burt Shotton
- Radio: WMGM; Red Barber, Connie Desmond, Ernie Harwell

The 1949 Brooklyn Dodgers held off the St. Louis Cardinals to win the National League title by one game. The Dodgers lost the World Series to the New York Yankees in five games.

== Offseason ==
- November 24, 1948: Tommy Lasorda was drafted by the Dodgers from the Philadelphia Phillies in the 1948 minor league draft.
- December 15, 1948: Pete Reiser was traded by the Dodgers to the Boston Braves for Mike McCormick and Nanny Fernandez.
- February 26, 1949: Hank Behrman was purchased from the Dodgers by the New York Giants.

== Regular season ==
Jackie Robinson led the NL in hitting and stolen bases and won the National League Most Valuable Player Award. Robinson was the first black player to win the NL MVP.

=== Season standings ===
National League
Team	W	L	Pct.	GB	Home	Road
Brooklyn Dodgers	97	57	.630	—	48‍–‍29	49‍–‍28
St. Louis Cardinals	96	58	.623	1	51‍–‍26	45‍–‍32
Philadelphia Phillies	81	73	.526	16	40‍–‍37	41‍–‍36
Boston Braves	75	79	.487	22	43‍–‍34	32‍–‍45
New York Giants	73	81	.474	24	43‍–‍34	30‍–‍47
Pittsburgh Pirates	71	83	.461	26	36‍–‍41	35‍–‍42
Cincinnati Reds	62	92	.403	35	35‍–‍42	27‍–‍50
Chicago Cubs	61	93	.396	36	33‍–‍44	28‍–‍49

=== Record vs. opponents ===
1949 National League record Sources:
Team	BSN	BRO	CHC	CIN	NYG	PHI	PIT	STL
Boston	—	10–12	12–10	12–10–1	12–10–2	11–11	12–10	6–16
Brooklyn	12–10	—	17–5	17–5	14–8	11–11	16–6	10–12–1
Chicago	10–12	5–17	—	9–13	12–10	6–16	11–11	8–14
Cincinnati	10–12–1	5–17	13–9	—	7–15	13–9	9–13	5–17–1
New York	10–12–2	8–14	10–12	15–7	—	11–11	12–10	7–15
Philadelphia	11–11	11–11	16–6	9–13	11–11	—	13–9	10–12
Pittsburgh	10–12	6–16	11–11	13–9	10–12	9–13	—	12–10
St. Louis	16–6	12–10–1	14–8	17–5–1	15–7	12–10	10–12	—

=== Opening Day lineup ===
Opening Day Starters
Name	Position
Cal Abrams	Left fielder
Pee Wee Reese	Shortstop
Duke Snider	Center fielder
Jackie Robinson	Second baseman
Carl Furillo	Right fielder
Billy Cox	Third baseman
Gil Hodges	First baseman
Roy Campanella	Catcher
Joe Hatten	Starting pitcher

=== Notable transactions ===
- May 16, 1949: Bob Ramazzotti was traded by the Dodgers to the Chicago Cubs for Hank Schenz.
- May 18, 1949: Marv Rackley was traded by the Dodgers to the Pittsburgh Pirates for Johnny Hopp and cash (trade voided June 7).
- May 19, 1949: Nanny Fernandez was traded by the Dodgers to the Pittsburgh Pirates for Ed Bahr and Grady Wilson.
- September 28, 1949: Kermit Wahl was traded by the Dodgers to the Philadelphia Athletics for Bill McCahan and cash.
- September 30, 1949: Irv Noren was purchased from the Dodgers by the Washington Senators.

=== Roster ===
1949 Brooklyn Dodgers
Roster
Pitchers: 11 Jack Banta; 26 Rex Barney; 13 Ralph Branca; 17 Carl Erskine; 19 Joe Hatten; 16 Morrie Martin; 23 Pat McGlothin; 38 Paul Minner; 36 Don Newcombe; 12 Erv Palica; 40 Bud Podbielan; 28 Preacher Roe; 37 Johnny Van Cuyk	Catchers: 39 Roy Campanella; 10 Bruce Edwards; Infielders: 3 Billy Cox; 14 Gil Hodges; 21 Spider Jorgensen; 34 Eddie Miksis; 9 Bob Ramazzotti; 1 Pee Wee Reese; 42 Jackie Robinson	Outfielders: 32 Cal Abrams; 9 Tommy Brown; 6 Carl Furillo; 22 Gene Hermanski; 35 Johnny Hopp; 7 Mike McCormick; 37 Luis Olmo; 35 Marv Rackley; 4 Duke Snider; 18 Dick Whitman; Other batters: 36 Chuck Connors; 8 George Shuba	Manager: -- Burt Shotton; Coaches: 31 Jake Pitler; 27 Milt Stock; 15 Clyde Sukeforth

== Player stats ==
= Indicates team leader

= Indicates league leader

=== Batting ===
==== Starters by position ====
Note: Pos = Position; G = Games played; AB = At bats; R = Runs; H = Hits; Avg. = Batting average; HR = Home runs; RBI = Runs batted in; SB = Stolen bases

Pos	Player	GP	AB	R	H	Avg.	HR	RBI	SB
C	Roy Campanella	130	436	65	125	.287	22	82	3
1B	Gil Hodges	156	596	94	170	.285	23	115	10
2B	Jackie Robinson	156	593	122	203	.342	16	124	37
SS	Pee Wee Reese	155	617	132	172	.279	16	73	26
3B	Billy Cox	100	390	48	91	.233	8	40	5
OF	Duke Snider	146	552	100	161	.292	23	92	12
OF	Gene Hermanski	87	224	48	67	.299	8	42	12
OF	Carl Furillo	142	549	95	177	.322	18	106	4

==== Other batters ====
Note: G = Games played; AB = At bats; H = Hits; Avg. = Batting average; HR = Home runs; RBI = Runs batted in

Player	GP	AB	H	Avg.	HR	RBI
Marv Rackley	63	150	45	.300	1	15
Bruce Edwards	64	148	31	.209	8	25
Mike McCormick	55	139	29	.209	2	14
Spider Jorgensen	53	134	36	.269	1	14
Eddie Miksis	50	113	25	.221	1	6
Luis Olmo	38	105	32	.305	1	14
Tommy Brown	41	89	27	.303	3	18
Dick Whitman	23	49	9	.184	0	2
Cal Abrams	8	24	2	.083	0	0
Johnny Hopp	8	14	0	.000	0	0
Bob Ramazzotti	5	13	2	.154	1	3
Chuck Connors	1	1	0	.000	0	0
George Shuba	1	1	0	.000	0	0

=== Pitching ===
==== Starting pitchers ====
Note: G = Games pitched; IP = Innings pitched; W = Wins; L = Losses; ERA = Earned run average; SO = Strikeouts

Player	G	IP	W	L	ERA	SO
Don Newcombe	38	244.1	17	8	3.17	149
Preacher Roe	30	212.2	15	6	2.79	109
Joe Hatten	37	187.1	12	8	4.18	58
Ralph Branca	34	186.2	13	5	4.39	109

==== Other pitchers ====
Note: G = Games pitched; IP = Innings pitched; W = Wins; L = Losses; ERA = Earned run average; SO = Strikeouts

Player	G	IP	W	L	ERA	SO
Jack Banta	48	152.1	10	6	3.37	97
Rex Barney	38	140.2	9	8	4.41	80
Morrie Martin	10	30.2	1	3	7.04	15

==== Relief pitchers ====
Note: G = Games pitched; W = Wins; L = Losses; SV = Saves; ERA = Earned run average; SO = Strikeouts

Player	G	W	L	SV	ERA	SO
Erv Palica	49	8	9	6	3.62	44
Paul Minner	27	3	1	2	3.80	17
Carl Erskine	22	8	1	0	4.63	49
Pat McGlothin	7	1	1	0	4.60	11
Bud Podbielan	7	0	1	0	3.65	5
Johnny Van Cuyk	2	0	0	0	9.00	0

== 1949 World Series ==
=== Game 1 ===
October 5, 1949, at Yankee Stadium in New York City

Team	1	2	3	4	5	6	7	8	9	R	H	E
Brooklyn	0	0	0	0	0	0	0	0	0	0	2	0
New York	0	0	0	0	0	0	0	0	1	1	5	1
WP: Allie Reynolds (1–0) LP: Don Newcombe (0–1); Home runs: BRK: None; NY: Tommy Henrich (1)

=== Game 2 ===
October 6, 1949, at Yankee Stadium in New York City

Team	1	2	3	4	5	6	7	8	9	R	H	E
Brooklyn	0	1	0	0	0	0	0	0	0	1	7	2
New York	0	0	0	0	0	0	0	0	0	0	6	1
WP: Preacher Roe (1–0) LP: Vic Raschi (0–1)

=== Game 3 ===
October 7, 1949, at Ebbets Field in Brooklyn, New York

Team	1	2	3	4	5	6	7	8	9	R	H	E
New York	0	0	1	0	0	0	0	0	3	4	5	0
Brooklyn	0	0	0	1	0	0	0	0	2	3	5	0
WP: Joe Page (1–0) LP: Ralph Branca (0–1); Home runs: NY: None; BRK: Pee Wee Reese (1), Luis Olmo (1), Roy Campanella (1)

=== Game 4 ===
October 8, 1949, at Ebbets Field in Brooklyn, New York

Team	1	2	3	4	5	6	7	8	9	R	H	E
New York	0	0	0	3	3	0	0	0	0	6	10	0
Brooklyn	0	0	0	0	0	4	0	0	0	4	9	1
WP: Eddie Lopat (1–0) LP: Don Newcombe (0–2)

=== Game 5 ===
October 9, 1949, at Ebbets Field in Brooklyn, New York

Team	1	2	3	4	5	6	7	8	9	R	H	E
New York	2	0	3	1	1	3	0	0	0	10	11	1
Brooklyn	0	0	1	0	0	1	4	0	0	6	11	2
WP: Vic Raschi (1–1) LP: Rex Barney (0–1); Home runs: NY: Joe DiMaggio (1); BRK: Gil Hodges (1)

== Awards and honors ==
- National League Most Valuable Player
  - Jackie Robinson
- National League Rookie of the Year
  - Don Newcombe

=== National League All-Stars ===
- 1949 Major League Baseball All-Star Game
  - Jackie Robinson starter
  - Pee Wee Reese starter
  - Ralph Branca reserve
  - Roy Campanella reserve
  - Gil Hodges reserve
  - Don Newcombe reserve
  - Preacher Roe reserve

=== The Sporting News awards ===
- TSN Major League All-Star Team
  - Roy Campanella
  - Jackie Robinson
- TSN NL Rookie of the Year Award
  - Don Newcombe

== Farm system ==
Level	Team	League	Manager
AAA	Hollywood Stars	Pacific Coast League	Fred Haney
AAA	Montreal Royals	International League	Clay Hopper
AAA	St. Paul Saints	American Association	Walter Alston
AA	Ft. Worth Cats	Texas League	Bobby Bragan
AA	Mobile Bears	Southern Association	Paul Chervinko
A	Greenville Spinners	South Atlantic League	Clay Bryant
A	Pueblo Dodgers	Western League	Ray Hathaway
B	Asheville Tourists	Tri-State League	Ed Head
B	Danville Dodgers	Illinois–Indiana–Iowa League	Lou Rochelli
B	Lancaster Red Roses	Interstate League	Al Campanis
B	Miami Sun Sox	Florida International League	Pepper Martin
B	Nashua Dodgers	New England League	Greg Mulleavy
B	Newport News Dodgers	Piedmont League	Roy Schalk
C	Billings Mustangs	Pioneer League	Larry Shepard
C	Geneva Robins	Border League	Charles Small
C	Greenwood Dodgers	Cotton States League	Jim Bivin
C	Johnstown Johnnies	Middle Atlantic League	Roy Nichols
C	Santa Barbara Dodgers	California League	Chester Kehn
D	Trois-Rivières Royals	Canadian–American League	George Scherger
D	Cairo Dodgers	Kentucky–Illinois–Tennessee League	William Hart
D	Cambridge Dodgers	Eastern Shore League	Mearl Strachan
D	Ponca City Dodgers	Kansas–Oklahoma–Missouri League	Boyd Bartley
D	Sheboygan Indians	Wisconsin State League	Joe Hauser
D	Valdosta Dodgers	Georgia–Florida League	Doc Alexson

LEAGUE CHAMPIONS: Hollywood, Montreal, Pueblo, Geneva
