= Pat McGlothin =

American baseball player (1920–2014)

- Pitcher
- Born: October 20, 1920; Coalfield, Tennessee, U.S.
- Died: October 24, 2014 (aged 94); Knoxville, Tennessee, U.S.
- Batted: Left Threw: Right

MLB debut
- April 25, 1949, for the Brooklyn Dodgers

Last MLB appearance
- April 18, 1950, for the Brooklyn Dodgers

MLB statistics
- Win–loss record: 1–1
- Earned run average: 5.60
- Strikeouts: 13
- Stats at Baseball Reference

Teams
- Brooklyn Dodgers (1949–1950)

Ezra Malachi "Pat" McGlothin (October 20, 1920 – October 24, 2014) was an American professional baseball pitcher who appeared in eight total games in Major League Baseball during 1949 and 1950 for the Brooklyn Dodgers. He was born in Coalfield, Tennessee and lived most of his life in Knoxville. He graduated from Central High School and attended the University of Tennessee.

McGlothin, a right-hander, was listed as 6 feet 3 inches (1.91 m) tall and 180 pounds (82 kg). His pro career extended from 1942 to 1954, with the 1943–1945 seasons missed because of his World War II service in the United States Navy. He was a successful minor-league hurler in the Brooklyn farm system, notching 13 or more victories six times in the seven seasons spanning 1946 to 1952.

McGlothin made the Dodgers' 1949 early-season roster and appeared in seven games, all in relief, between April 25 and May 13. He compiled a 1–1 won–lost record with no saves in 152/3 innings pitched. His victory occurred on May 7, 1949, at Ebbets Field against the Chicago Cubs. Dodger starting pitcher Ralph Branca exited the game for a pinch hitter in the fourth inning, trailing 4–3. By the time McGlothin took the mound in the top of the fifth frame, Brooklyn had piled on six runs to take the lead 9–4, which McGlothin preserved by throwing five innings of one-hit, shutout ball. Brooklyn came away with a 10–4 victory. He appeared in one game in 1951 on April 18, when he was ineffective in a mop-up assignment against the Philadelphia Phillies.

All told, McGlothin posted a 1–1 career record in MLB with a 5.60 earned run average in eight relief assignments, allowing 18 hits, six bases on balls, and 11 earned runs in 172/3 innings pitched. He struck out 13. In the minors, he went 108–76 in 292 career games pitched. He died four days after his 94th birthday on October 24, 2014.
