= Ray Poat =

American baseball player (1917–1990)

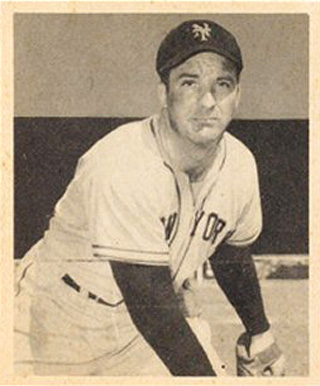
- 1948 Bowman baseball card
- Pitcher
- Born: December 19, 1917; Chicago, Illinois, U.S.
- Died: April 29, 1990 (aged 72); Oak Lawn, Illinois, U.S.
- Batted: Right Threw: Right

MLB debut
- April 15, 1942, for the Cleveland Indians

Last MLB appearance
- September 21, 1949, for the Pittsburgh Pirates

MLB statistics
- Win–loss record: 22–30
- Earned run average: 4.55
- Innings pitched: 400
- Stats at Baseball Reference

Teams
- Cleveland Indians (1942–1944); New York Giants (1947–1949); Pittsburgh Pirates (1949)

Raymond Willis Poat (December 19, 1917 – April 29, 1990) was an American professional baseball player native to Chicago. A right-handed pitcher, he played six Major League seasons, for the Cleveland Indians from 1942 to 1944, the New York Giants from 1947 to 1949, and the Pittsburgh Pirates in 1949. He stood 6 feet 2 inches (1.88 m) tall and weighed 200 pounds (91 kg).

He was traded along with Bobby Rhawn from the Giants to the Pirates for Kirby Higbe on June 6, 1949.

Poat appeared in 116 MLB games (47 as a starting pitcher) and an even 400 innings. He allowed 425 hits and 162 bases on balls, recording 178 strikeouts. He was a very successful hurler in minor league baseball, winning 91 of 135 decisions (.674).

== Hitting for the "season cycle" ==
Poat's grave at Chapel Hill Gardens South, Oak Lawn, Illinois

Poat became the first Major League player to achieve a season cycle, which is getting just four hits in a season, yet getting one hit of each type: single, double, triple and home run.
