= Kirby Higbe =

American baseball player (1915–1985)

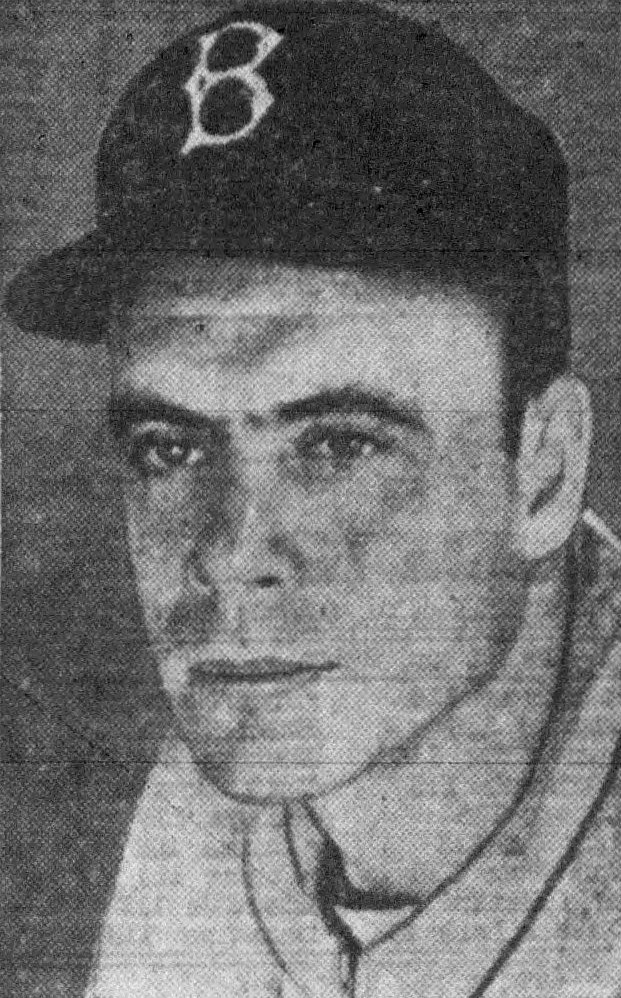
- Higbe, circa 1942
- Pitcher
- Born: April 8, 1915; Columbia, South Carolina, U.S.
- Died: May 6, 1985 (aged 70); Columbia, South Carolina, U.S.
- Batted: Right Threw: Right

MLB debut
- October 3, 1937, for the Chicago Cubs

Last MLB appearance
- July 7, 1950, for the New York Giants

MLB statistics
- Win–loss record: 118–101
- Earned run average: 3.69
- Strikeouts: 971
- Stats at Baseball Reference

Teams
- Chicago Cubs (1937–1939); Philadelphia Phillies (1939–1940); Brooklyn Dodgers (1941–1943, 1946–1947); Pittsburgh Pirates (1947–1949); New York Giants (1949–1950)

Career highlights and awards
- 2× All-Star (1940, 1946); NL wins leader (1941); NL strikeout leader (1940)

Walter Kirby Higbe (April 8, 1915 – May 6, 1985) was an American right-handed starting pitcher in Major League Baseball (MLB) from 1937 to 1950. Best known for his time with the Brooklyn Dodgers, he was a two-time National League (NL) All-Star.

== Early baseball career ==
Higbe was born in Columbia, South Carolina, in 1915. A hard thrower, he played mostly in the minor leagues from 1933 to 1938. In 1937, with the Moline Plowboys of the Illinois–Indiana–Iowa League, Higbe had a 21–5 record and led the league in wins. He also had short stints with the NL's Chicago Cubs in 1937 and 1938.

In May 1939, the Cubs traded Higbe to the Philadelphia Phillies. He finally stuck in the majors, and in 1940, went 14–19 with a 3.72 earned run average (ERA) for a last place Phillies' team. That year he led the NL with 137 strikeouts, and was named an All-Star.

== Brooklyn Dodgers ==
In November 1940, the Phillies traded Higbe to the Brooklyn Dodgers for Bill Crouch, Mickey Livingston, Vito Tamulis, and $100,000. Higbe had his most successful season in 1941, going 22–9 with a 3.14 ERA and 121 strikeouts. He tied his teammate Whit Wyatt for the league-lead in wins and finished seventh in the NL MVP voting as the Dodgers won the pennant. In the 1941 World Series, Higbe started one game but did not get a decision, and the Dodgers lost the series to the New York Yankees.

Higbe went 16–11 in 1942 and then went 13–10 in 1943. After the 1943 season, he joined the United States Army during World War II. Initially assigned to the military police, he soon received training as a rifleman and saw combat in Germany. In 1945, Higbe and his fellow soldiers went to the Philippines; however, when they arrived there, they learned that Japan had surrendered. Nonetheless, he stayed in Manila until March 1946, at which point he finally returned to the United States.

Back with the Dodgers for the 1946 season, Higbe went 17–8 with a 3.03 ERA and 134 strikeouts. He was named an All-Star for the second time. He began the 1947 season with a 2–0 record for the eventual NL champion Dodgers, but he insisted upon being traded when Brooklyn added Jackie Robinson to the team as the first black major leaguer in the 20th century. According to Higbe, the Dodger players who were opposed to having Robinson on the team "didn't have anything personal against Jackie Robinson or any other Negro ... but we were Southerners who had never lived or played with Negroes, and we didn't see any reason to start then."

== Later baseball career ==
The Dodgers traded Higbe to the Pittsburgh Pirates in May 1947. He was reunited with his old Dodgers manager Leo Durocher when he was acquired by the New York Giants from the Pirates for Bobby Rhawn and Ray Poat on June 6, 1949. Towards the end of his career, Higbe threw primarily knuckleballs. His last season in the majors was 1950. He then went back to the minor leagues, where he played until 1953.

Higbe finished his MLB career with a 118–101 record, a 3.69 ERA, 971 strikeouts, and a 102 ERA+.

== Later life ==
After his baseball career ended, Higbe drifted from job to job, getting in trouble with the law multiple times. He published an autobiography, The High Hard One, in 1967.

Higbe died in Columbia, South Carolina, in 1985 at the age of 70. In the 2013 film 42, he was portrayed by Brad Beyer.

== See also ==
- List of Major League Baseball annual strikeout leaders
- List of Major League Baseball annual wins leaders
