= Beans Reardon =

American baseball umpire (1897–1984)

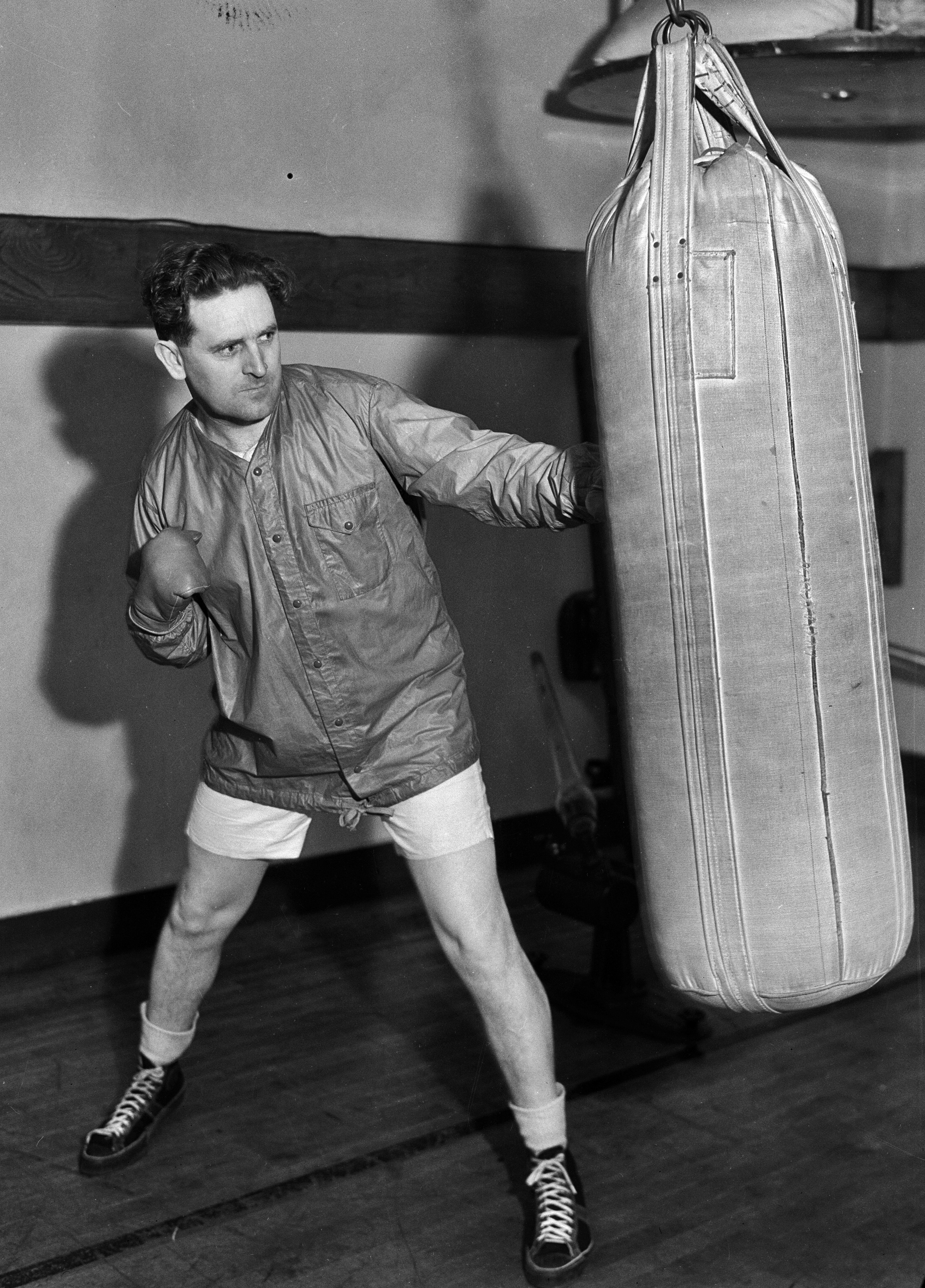
Reardon working out, 1936

John Edward "Beans" Reardon (November 23, 1897 – July 31, 1984) was an American umpire in Major League Baseball who worked in the National League from 1926 to 1949. He worked five World Series and three All-Star Games.

== Early life and career ==
Born on November 23, 1897, in Taunton, Massachusetts, Reardon's family moved to Los Angeles when he was 14, and he acquired his nickname as a youth due to his Boston-area origins. Having no chance at a career playing baseball due to a throwing arm ruined by overexertion in sandlot ball, he began umpiring amateur games as a teenager. He got his professional start with a copper miners' league in Arizona in 1919, but after arriving for duty and learning that his contract required him to work in the mines, he resigned after one day's work, followed by a doubleheader he umpired singlehandedly.

== Career ==
From 1920 to 1921, he umpired in the Western Canada League, where he made his reputation in Edmonton by refusing a police escort out of a park after a particularly contentious game before a hostile crowd, saying, "I didn't sneak in and I won't sneak out." He then worked in the Pacific Coast League for four seasons before reaching the major leagues. While based in California, Reardon mentored future Edmonton umpire John Ducey.

He was known for his many arguments on the field, and for the fact that he relished the opportunity to match the players in his use of off-color language; he came to refer to himself as "the last of the cussin' umpires", and rarely ejected players from games, reportedly because he enjoyed trading insults. At one point in his career, NL president Ford Frick issued a memo to all field personnel requiring them to reduce their use of profanity, a thinly veiled move directed primarily at Reardon.

Reardon had a difficult relationship with longtime NL umpire Bill Klem, the dean of the league staff; the younger umpire insisted upon wearing the outside chest protector used by American League umpires, rather than the inside protector favored by Klem. Reardon also regularly conversed during games with spectators in the stands, another annoyance to Klem. Reardon would note that he perhaps stayed as long as he did in the league only because Klem was promoted to a non-field position in 1941. Ever outspoken, upon accepting an award named for Klem from Houston sportswriters in the 1960s, Reardon offhandedly remarked that he and Klem hated one another.

== Notable games ==
He officiated in five World Series: 1930, 1934, 1939, 1943 and 1949. He also umpired in three All-Star Games (1936, 1940, 1948), calling balls and strikes in all three contests; and he was one of the umpires for the 3-game series to determine the NL champion in 1946. He was the plate umpire when Babe Ruth hit his 714th and final home run in 1935, and also for Clyde Shoun's no-hitter on May 15, 1944.

== Later life ==
Reardon retired following the 1949 World Series. By the late 1940s, he was the highest-paid umpire in the league, he was earning three times as much from his offseason business as an Anheuser-Busch beer distributor. He eventually sold the distributorship to Frank Sinatra for over half a million dollars in 1967, although he continued to do public relations work for the brewery.

Reardon made an uncredited appearance as an umpire in the 1953 film The Kid from Left Field.

== Personal life ==
Reardon suffered two strokes late in his life, and died on July 31, 1984, aged 86, in Long Beach, California.

Beans was friends with Mae West and she is said to have sent him a copy of a nude photograph every Christmas. He appeared in several of her movies.

He was notably the basis for the home plate umpire in Norman Rockwell's famous painting Bottom of the Sixth, flanked by umpires Larry Goetz and Lou Jorda. Reardon is largely identifiable because, despite the depicted game being in the National League, the umpire is using the outside chest protector.

== See also ==
- List of Major League Baseball umpires (disambiguation)
