= Bobby Rhawn =

American baseball player (1919–1984)

- Third baseman
- Born: February 13, 1919; Catawissa, Pennsylvania, U.S.
- Died: June 9, 1984 (aged 65); Danville, Pennsylvania, U.S.
- Batted: Right Threw: Right

MLB debut
- September 17, 1947, for the New York Giants

Last MLB appearance
- July 31, 1949, for the Chicago White Sox

MLB statistics
- Batting average: .237
- Home runs: 2
- Runs batted in: 18
- Stats at Baseball Reference

Teams
- New York Giants (1947–1949); Pittsburgh Pirates (1949); Chicago White Sox (1949)

Robert John Rhawn (February 13, 1919 – June 8, 1984) was an American professional baseball player. He appeared in the Major Leagues, primarily as a third baseman, for the New York Giants, Pittsburgh Pirates and Chicago White Sox between 1947 and 1949. Nicknamed "Rocky", Rhawn got into 90 MLB games during parts of those three seasons. He had an 11-year career overall (1938–1940; 1945–1952), most of it taking place at the highest levels of minor league baseball. He also served in the United States Army during World War II.

Rhawn batted and threw right-handed; he stood 5 feet 8 inches (1.73 m) tall and weighed 180 pounds (82 kg). He made his MLB debut after the end of the 1947 minor league season—when he had batted .302 and knocked in 90 runs, and made the American Association's All-Star team as a utility player. In Rhawn's first big-league contest, he relieved Giants' second baseman Bill Rigney in mid-game, collected two singles in two at bats, and scored two runs in a 9–3 Giants' victory over the Chicago Cubs at Wrigley Field. Four days later, he went 3–for–4 against the Philadelphia Phillies, and hit the first of his two MLB home runs, a two-run shot off Schoolboy Rowe, pacing a 6–4 New York win.

He was traded along with Ray Poat from the Giants to the Pirates for Kirby Higbe on June 6, 1949.

Rhawn's 47 MLB hits also included nine doubles and two triples.
