= Jimmy McMath =

American baseball player (1949–2010)

- Outfielder
- Born: August 10, 1949; Tuscaloosa, Alabama, U.S.
- Died: July 20, 2010 (aged 60); Meadville, Mississippi, U.S.
- Batted: Left Threw: Left

MLB debut
- September 7, 1968, for the Chicago Cubs

Last MLB appearance
- September 22, 1968, for the Chicago Cubs

MLB statistics
- Batting average: .143
- Home runs: 0
- Runs batted in: 2
- Stats at Baseball Reference

Teams
- Chicago Cubs (1968)

Jimmy Lee McMath (August 10, 1949 – July 20, 2010) was an American professional baseball player. He played part of the 1968 season in Major League Baseball for the Chicago Cubs, primarily as a left fielder. Listed at 6 feet 1 1/2 inches (1.87 m), 195 pounds (88 kg), he batted and threw left-handed.

A native of Tuscaloosa, Alabama, McMath was drafted by the Cubs in the second round of the 1967 amateur draft, and immediately was assigned to their minor league system with the Caldwell Cubs of the Pioneer League.

McMath garnered some attention after hitting a .388 average in 51 games for the Quincy Cubs of the Midwest League to start 1968. He was promoted to the Double-A San Antonio Missions, where he hit .263 in 75 games. Still just 19 years old, he was promoted to the big club in late September, the youngest player in the National League in 1968. He went 2-for-14 for a .143 average and drove in two runs in just six games. Defensively, he played 3 games at left field with 6 put outs.

McMath split 1969 between San Antonio and the Triple-A Tacoma Cubs. He returned to Tacoma in 1970, but hit just .213 in 51 games. In 1971, he went backwards through the Cubs system, playing first at San Antonio, where he hit just .212, and then going back down to Quincy. After the season, he was let go, his career over at age 22. Overall, McMath hit .269 with 22 home runs in 398 minor league games from 1967 to 1971.

McMath died in Meadville, Mississippi, at the age of 60.

== Sources ==
- Career statistics from Baseball Reference · Baseball Reference (Minors) · Retrosheet · Baseball Almanac
- Obituary
