= Mike McCormick (outfielder) =

American baseball player (1917–1976)

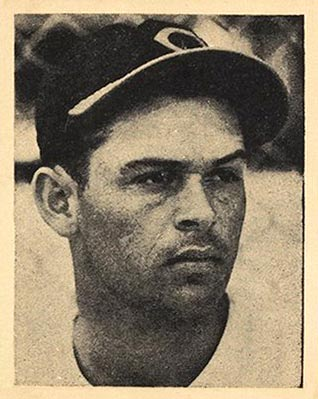
- Outfielder
- Born: May 6, 1917; Angels Camp, California, U.S.
- Died: April 13, 1976 (aged 58); Los Angeles, California, U.S.
- Batted: Right Threw: Right

MLB debut
- April 16, 1940, for the Cincinnati Reds

Last MLB appearance
- September 30, 1951, for the Washington Senators

MLB statistics
- Batting average: .275
- Home runs: 14
- Runs batted in: 215
- Stats at Baseball Reference

Teams
- Cincinnati Reds (1940–1943, 1946); Boston Braves (1946–1948); Brooklyn Dodgers (1949); New York Giants (1950); Chicago White Sox (1950); Washington Senators (1951)

Career highlights and awards
- World Series champion (1940); Cincinnati Reds Hall of Fame

Myron Winthrop "Mike" McCormick (May 6, 1917 – April 13, 1976) was an American professional baseball player. He was an outfielder for the Cincinnati Reds (1940–43 and 1946), Boston Braves (1946–48), Brooklyn Dodgers (1949), New York Giants (1950), Chicago White Sox (1950) and Washington Senators (1951) of Major League Baseball.

== Biography ==
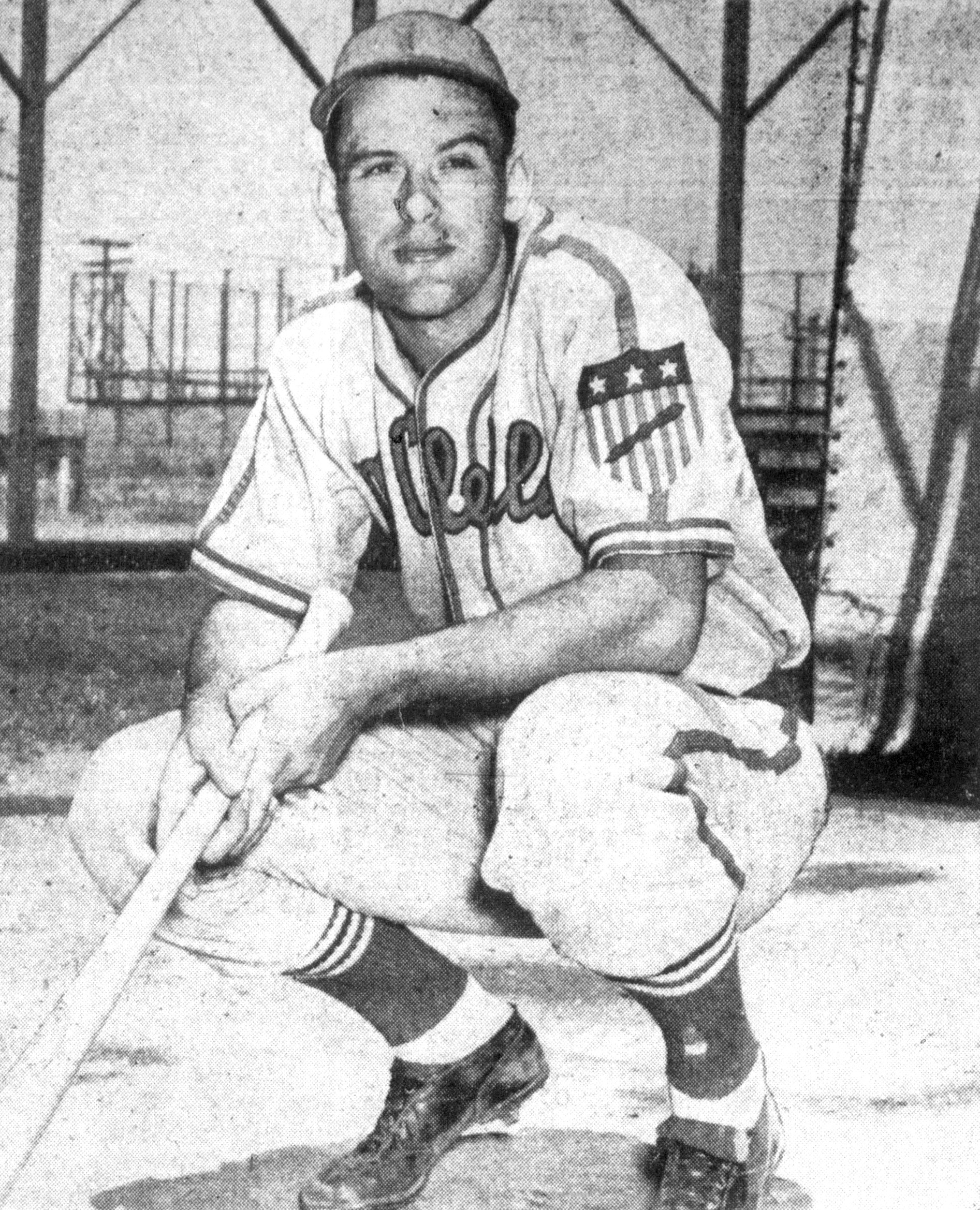
McCormick in 1943

McCormick was born in Angels Camp, California, stood 6 feet (180 cm) tall, weighed 190 pounds (86 kg), and threw and batted right-handed.

He helped the Reds win the 1940 World Series, and led the National League in sacrifice hits that season. Forty games into the 1942 season, McCormick was sidelined with a broken leg. He returned to the Reds for the 1943 season, but he was inducted into the military after only a few games. He missed the 1944 and 1945 seasons due to military service. He served in the Army Air Force and played on a military baseball team with Joe DiMaggio in Hawaii.

After the Braves won the 1948 National League pennant, he was traded from the Braves to the Brooklyn Dodgers in December of that year; he and an unnamed player were sent to Brooklyn in exchange for Pete Reiser. The Dodgers won the 1949 NL pennant. The next year, he was signed by the New York Giants, played for Oakland of the Pacific Coast League, and had his contract purchased by the Chicago White Sox that June.

In 10 seasons he played in 748 games and had 2,325 at bats, 302 runs, 640 hits, 100 doubles, 29 triples, 14 home runs, 215 RBI, 16 stolen bases, 188 walks, .275 batting average, .330 on-base percentage, .361 slugging percentage, 840 total bases and 72 sacrifice hits. Defensively, he recorded a .980 fielding percentage at all three outfield positions.

In April 1976, McCormick was attending a game at Dodger Stadium when he suffered a heart attack. He died at a Los Angeles hospital.
