= Larry Goetz =

American baseball umpire (1895–1962)

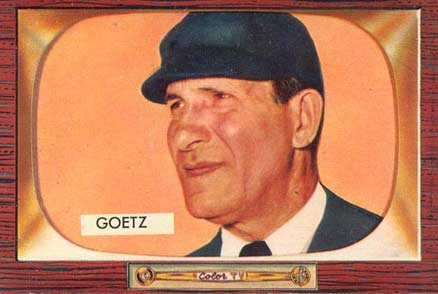
- Born: Lawrence John Goetz; February 15, 1895; Cincinnati, Ohio, U.S.
- Died: October 31, 1962 (aged 67); Cincinnati, Ohio, U.S.
- Years active: 1920s–1950s
- Known for: Umpire
- Spouse: Ruth Elston

Lawrence John Goetz (February 15, 1895 – October 31, 1962) was an American professional baseball umpire.

Goetz started umpiring in the Blue Grass League from 1920 to 1922. He also umpired in the Western Ohio League, Piedmont League, and the American Association.

Goetz then became a successful National League umpire from 1936 through the 1957 season, working in 3,218 games. Goetz was an umpire in the 1941, 1947 and 1952 World Series and was an alternate for the 1940 series as well as working the 1939 Major League Baseball All-Star Game. Goetz was also home plate umpire for Vern Bickford's no-hitter on August 11, 1950. He was one of the umpires in Norman Rockwell's famous painting Bottom of the Sixth, along with Beans Reardon and Lou Jorda.

Goetz was known for being a strict disciplinarian and not taking arguments from players, and as a result he earned their respect.

Goetz was dismissed in 1957 by National League President Warren Giles, having been inactive the previous season due to illness. The discharged arbitrator had been critical of the Senior Circuit because of the refusal by the league to include umpires in the retired players' pension fund.

In Goetz' last years he served as a commentator for the Mutual Broadcasting Company and had made appearances on local Cincinnati radio programs. He died in his native Cincinnati at the age of 67, following a heart attack. Goetz had a wife, Helen.
