= Frank Hershey (baseball) =

American baseball player (1877-1949)

- Pitcher
- Born: December 13, 1877; Gorham, New York
- Died: December 15, 1949 (aged 72); Canandaigua, New York
- Batted: Unknown Threw: Right

MLB debut
- April 20, 1905, for the Boston Beaneaters

Last MLB appearance
- April 20, 1905, for the Boston Beaneaters

MLB statistics
- Win–loss record: 0–1
- Earned run average: 6.75
- Strikeouts: 1

Teams
- Boston Beaneaters (1905)

Frank Hershey (December 13, 1877 – December 15, 1949) was a Major League Baseball right-handed pitcher. He played in one game, on April 20, 1905 for the Boston Beaneaters.

== Sources ==
- Frank Hershey at Baseball Reference.com
