= Lou Jorda =

American baseball umpire (1893–1964)

- Born: Louis Delarond Jorda; May 22, 1893; New Orleans, Louisiana, U.S.
- Died: May 27, 1964 (aged 71); Largo, Florida, U.S.
- Occupation: Umpire
- Years active: 1927–1931, 1940–1952
- Employer: National League

Louis Delarond Jorda (May 22, 1893 – May 27, 1964) was an American professional baseball umpire who worked in the National League from 1927 to 1931 and again from 1940 to 1952.

== Minor league playing career ==
Jorda began his baseball career in 1913 as a catcher for the Gadsden Steel Makers of the Georgia–Alabama League. He played in the minor leagues until 1916.

== Umpiring career ==
In 1919, Jorda started his umpiring career in the Cotton States League. He moved on to the Sally League in 1920, and stayed there until after the 1926 season.

The National League hired Jorda in 1927. Over his 18-year big league umpiring career, Jorda umpired 2,509 major league games, in addition to working two All-Star Games (1941 and 1951), and two World Series (1945, and 1949).

== Later life ==
After his umpiring career, he was a partner in a beer distributorship with retired colleague Beans Reardon in southern California.

Jorda was one of the umpires featured in Norman Rockwell's famous painting Bottom of the Sixth, along with Reardon and Larry Goetz.

== Death ==
Jorda died at his Florida home on May 27, 1964, just five days after his 71st birthday. He was survived by his wife, son and daughter.

== See also ==
- List of Major League Baseball umpires (disambiguation)
