= Marv Rackley =

American baseball player (1921–2018)

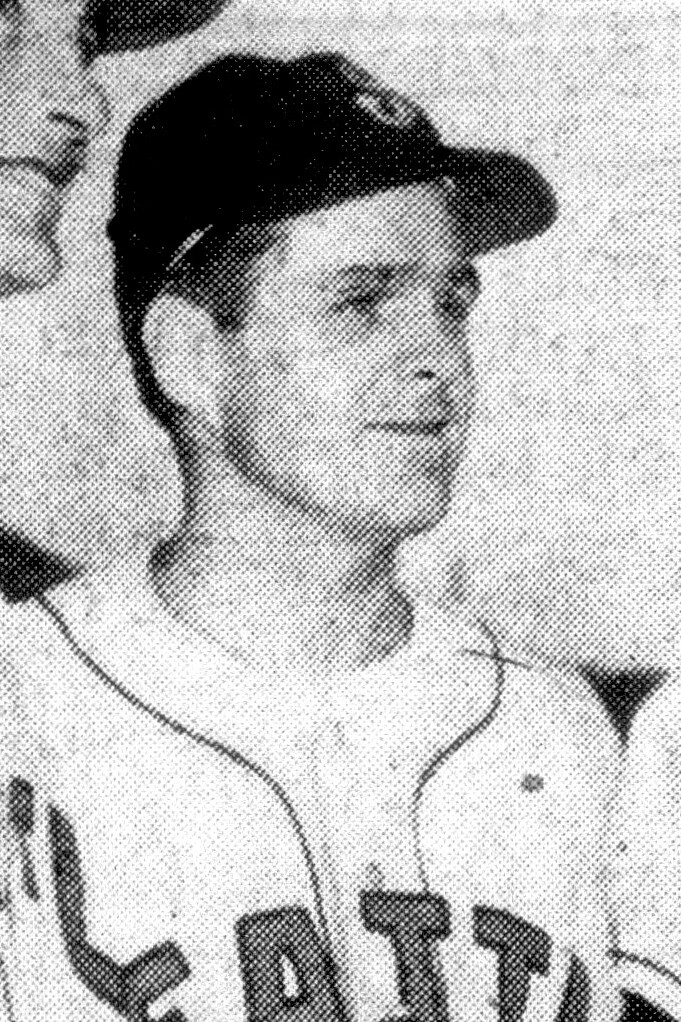
- Rackley in 1950
- Center fielder
- Born: July 25, 1921; Seneca, South Carolina, U.S.
- Died: April 24, 2018 (aged 96); Greenville, South Carolina, U.S.
- Batted: Left Threw: Left

MLB debut
- April 15, 1947, for the Brooklyn Dodgers

Last MLB appearance
- May 8, 1950, for the Cincinnati Reds

MLB statistics
- Batting average: .317
- Runs scored: 87
- Runs batted in: 35
- Stats at Baseball Reference

Teams
- Brooklyn Dodgers (1947–1949); Pittsburgh Pirates (1949); Cincinnati Reds (1950)

Marvin Eugene Rackley (July 25, 1921 – April 24, 2018) was an American baseball player who was an outfielder in Major League Baseball. He played from 1947 to 1950 with the Brooklyn Dodgers, Pittsburgh Pirates, and Cincinnati Reds. He appeared in the 1949 World Series as a member of the Dodgers.

== Career ==
Rackley was born in Seneca, South Carolina. He signed with the Dodgers in 1941, at the age of 19. In his first professional season, he hit .322 in the Georgia–Florida League. After the 1942 season, Rackley enlisted in the Army Air Force. He spent three years in the service and also played some semi-pro baseball.

In 1946, Rackley was discharged and returned to organized baseball. The Dodgers sent him to the Montreal Royals of the International League, where he was teammates with Jackie Robinson in Robinson's first minor league season. While Robinson was the star of the team, Rackley also played well, batting .305 and leading the league in triples (14) and stolen base (64). Montreal won the pennant and the Junior World Series. After the season, Robinson hired Rackley to play on the Jackie Robinson All-Stars exhibition team.

Rackley joined the Dodgers in 1947. He made his major league debut as a pinch-runner on April 15, in the same game that Jackie Robinson made his debut as the starting first baseman. Rackley would be the last surviving player from either team in that game.

In 18 games in 1947, Rackley batted .222. He finished the season in the American Association. Rackley then rejoined Brooklyn in 1948 and had his best major league campaign, hitting .327 in 88 games. On May 1, 1949, he was traded to Pittsburgh for first baseman Johnny Hopp. But after three weeks with the Pirates (during which Rackley appeared in 11 games played and batted .314), the trade was voided on June 7 and Rackley went back to the Dodgers. He was purchased by Cincinnati in October, for $60,000. He played five games for them in 1950 before going to the Pacific Coast League's Seattle Rainiers. Over the next several years, Rackley also played in the Southern Association and the International League. He retired in 1955 and died in April 2018 at the age of 96.
