= Johnny Hopp =

American baseball player and coach (1916–2003)

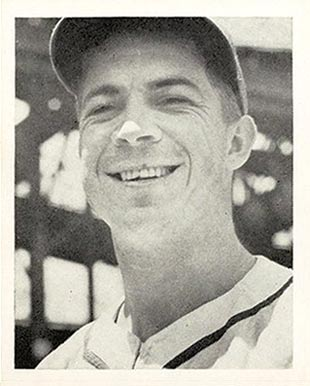
- Outfielder / First baseman
- Born: July 18, 1916; Hastings, Nebraska, U.S.
- Died: June 1, 2003 (aged 86); Scottsbluff, Nebraska, U.S.
- Batted: Left Threw: Left

MLB debut
- September 18, 1939, for the St. Louis Cardinals

Last MLB appearance
- September 27, 1952, for the Detroit Tigers

MLB statistics
- Batting average: .296
- Home runs: 46
- Runs batted in: 458
- Stats at Baseball Reference

Teams
- St. Louis Cardinals (1939–1945); Boston Braves (1946–1947); Pittsburgh Pirates (1948–1949); Brooklyn Dodgers (1949); Pittsburgh Pirates (1949–1950); New York Yankees (1950–1952); Detroit Tigers (1952)

Career highlights and awards
- All-Star (1946); 4× World Series champion (1942, 1944, 1950, 1951)

John Leonard Hopp (July 18, 1916 – June 1, 2003) was an American professional baseball player and coach. Born in Hastings, Nebraska, he was an outfielder and first baseman who appeared in 1,393 Major League Baseball games over 14 seasons (1939–52) for the St. Louis Cardinals, Boston Braves, Pittsburgh Pirates, Brooklyn Dodgers, New York Yankees and Detroit Tigers. He threw and batted left-handed, and was listed as 5 feet 10 inches (1.78 m) tall and 170 pounds (77 kg). He was nicknamed "Cotney" as a youth because of his blond ("cotton-top") hair.

As a Cardinal and Yankee, Hopp appeared in five World Series between 1942 and 1951 and was a member of the winning team in four of them.

== Playing and coaching career ==
Hopp graduated from Hastings High School, and attended Hastings College. Signed by the Cardinals in 1936, he apprenticed in their extensive farm system for four seasons, hitting over .300 three times.

=== Cardinals ===
Hopp made his Cardinal debut on September 18, 1939, and entered the big leagues for good the following season. During his first season as a regular, 1941, Hopp started 75 games in the outfield and another 33 as backup first baseman to slugger Johnny Mize. He batted .303 with 135 hits, including 25 doubles and 11 triples, third in the National League. He also stole 15 bases, fifth-most in the league. Both 1942 and 1943 saw Hopp slump at the plate, but contribute to back-to-back Cardinal pennants. In the 1942 World Series, Hopp started all five games at first base, and although he collected only three singles in 17 at bats to the cause, St. Louis won the world championship over the New York Yankees, four games to one.

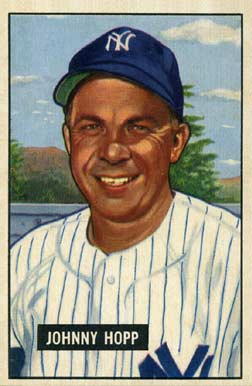
Hopp with the Yankees

Then, in 1944, he had his best overall season. Playing as the Cardinals' everyday center fielder (in the absence of Terry Moore, who was performing World War II military service), Hopp reached career highs in hits (177), runs scored (106), doubles (35), home runs (11) and runs batted in (72); his batting average (.336) was his second-best. The Redbirds won their third consecutive National League championship. In the all-St. Louis 1944 World Series, he again started every game and played errorless ball as the Cardinals won their second world title in three seasons, overcoming the Browns, four victories to two. Hopp had a relatively quiet Series at the plate, collecting five singles in 17 at bats.

=== Braves ===
The last wartime season, 1945, saw Hopp become the Cardinals' regular right fielder, and his batting average fell to .289 as St. Louis finished second, three games behind the Chicago Cubs. That off-season, Cardinal manager Billy Southworth moved to the Boston Braves, and with the surplus of major-league talent coming back from wartime service, Boston began purchasing players who had contributed to Southworth's successful Cardinal teams of 1940–45. They obtained Hopp for shortstop Eddie Joost and cash on February 5, 1946. The trade led to Hopp's second-most-productive campaign. Splitting time between first base and center field, he collected 148 hits and batted .333, and stole a career-high 21 bases. Selected to the 1946 National League All-Star team, Hopp started in center field at Fenway Park on July 9 and singled against Bob Feller in two at bats. It would be his only career All-Star appearance.

=== Pirates ===
Hopp returned to the Braves in 1947, but was platooned in center field with right-handed-hitting Mike McCormick and his average fell to .288. That November, he was swapped to the Pirates for their center fielder, Jim Russell, in a five-player deal. Hopp would be the Pirates' regular center fielder in 1948 and 1949, with the exception of a three-week period in the latter season. On May 18, 1949, he was traded to the Dodgers for outfielder Marv Rackley. He appeared in eight games for Brooklyn, including two starting assignments, but went 0-for-14 at the plate, dropping his average to .174 on the season. Then, on June 7, the trade was canceled and Rackley and Hopp returned to their original clubs. Hopp responded by batting .335 with 106 hits through the rest of the season for the Pirates (raising his final average to .306). His hot streak continued in 1950 when, as the Bucs' starting first baseman, Hopp added another 108 safeties. He was hitting .340 on September 5 when last-place Pittsburgh sent him to the Yankees in a waiver deal.

=== Yankees ===
The Yankees were then embroiled in a pennant scramble with the Detroit Tigers, and Hopp's game-winning pinch hit grand slam against the Browns on September 17 contributed to the Yankees' surge to the American League championship. He went 9-for-27 (.333) as a Yankee during that stretch drive. Allowed to participate in the World Series despite his post-August-31 acquisition, Hopp got into three games and was hitless in two at bats. He hung on in the American League as a part-time player for the next two seasons. In 1951, Hopp was a pinch hitter and the Yankees' third-string first baseman (behind Joe Collins and Mize) and made his final World Series appearance, drawing a walk in his only plate appearance in Game 3.

The Yankees released Hopp in late May 1952 and he caught on days later with the Tigers, who had fallen all the way from pennant contention in 1950 to last place in 1952. Appearing mostly as a pinch hitter, Hopp batted only .217 for the Tigers and retired as an active player.

=== Career summary ===
In his 14 MLB seasons, Hopp collected 1,262 hits, with 216 doubles, 74 triples, 46 home runs and 458 runs batted in. He hit .296 lifetime and stole 128 bases. Defensively, Hopp posted a .986 fielding percentage playing first base and all three outfield positions. Although on the winning side in four of the five World Series he played in, Hopp batted .160 (with eight hits, all singles) with no runs batted in 50 Fall Classic at bats.

His last big-league manager, Fred Hutchinson, appointed Hopp to his coaching staff with the 1954 Tigers and 1956 Cardinals.

== After baseball ==
Hopp then left pro baseball and returned to Hastings, where he worked for Kansas-Nebraska Energy, conducted baseball schools and was a motivational speaker. He was elected to the Lincoln Journal's Nebraska Sports Hall of Fame (1985) and the Nebraska High School Hall of Fame (1997). He died, aged 86, in Scottsbluff, Nebraska, and was interred in Hastings' Parkview Cemetery.

== See also ==
- List of Major League Baseball single-game hits leaders
- List of St. Louis Cardinals coaches
