= 1947 New York Giants (MLB) season =

1947 New York Giants
- League: National League
- Ballpark: Polo Grounds
- City: New York City
- Record: 81–73 (.526)
- League place: 4th
- Owners: Horace Stoneham
- General managers: Chub Feeney
- Managers: Mel Ott
- Television: WNBT (Frankie Frisch, Steve Ellis)
- Radio: WMCA (Frankie Frisch, Steve Ellis)

The 1947 New York Giants season was the franchise's 65th season. The team finished in fourth place in the National League with an 81–73 record, 13 games behind the Brooklyn Dodgers. It was the first season to be broadcast on television, with WNBT acting as the official team television broadcast partner.

== Offseason ==
- December 19, 1946: Harry Danning was released by the Giants.
- Prior to 1947 season: Nick Testa was acquired by the Giants from the Walden Hummingbirds.

== Regular season ==
- April 18: In the third inning of a game against the Brooklyn Dodgers, Dave Koslo gave up Jackie Robinson's first major league home run.
- April 19: 32,355 paying fans and 736 servicemen set the record for the biggest Saturday attendance at the Polo Grounds. Jackie Robinson had three at bats and had two singles and one double. The Giants still managed to win the game by a score of 4–3.

Between September 5 and 23, the Giants hit at least one home run in each of 19 games, the longest such streak in franchise history (considering records from 1914 onwards).

=== Season standings ===
National League
Team	W	L	Pct.	GB	Home	Road
Brooklyn Dodgers	94	60	.610	—	52‍–‍25	42‍–‍35
St. Louis Cardinals	89	65	.578	5	46‍–‍31	43‍–‍34
Boston Braves	86	68	.558	8	50‍–‍27	36‍–‍41
New York Giants	81	73	.526	13	45‍–‍31	36‍–‍42
Cincinnati Reds	73	81	.474	21	42‍–‍35	31‍–‍46
Chicago Cubs	69	85	.448	25	36‍–‍43	33‍–‍42
Philadelphia Phillies	62	92	.403	32	38‍–‍38	24‍–‍54
Pittsburgh Pirates	62	92	.403	32	32‍–‍45	30‍–‍47

=== Record vs. opponents ===
1947 National League record Sources:
Team	BSN	BRO	CHC	CIN	NYG	PHI	PIT	STL
Boston	—	12–10	13–9	13–9	13–9	14–8	12–10	9–13
Brooklyn	10–12	—	15–7	15–7	14–8	14–8	15–7	11–11–1
Chicago	9–13	7–15	—	12–10	7–15	16–6–1	8–14	10–12
Cincinnati	9–13	7–15	10–12	—	13–9	13–9	13–9	8–14
New York	9–13	8–14	15–7	9–13	—	12–10	15–7–1	13–9
Philadelphia	8–14	8–14	6–16–1	9–13	10–12	—	13–9	8–14
Pittsburgh	10–12	7–15	14–8	9–13	7–15–1	9–13	—	6–16–1
St. Louis	13–9	11–11–1	12–10	14–8	9–13	14–8	16–6–1	—

=== Opening Day lineup ===
- Centerfield: Fuzz White
- Shortstop: Bill Rigney
- Leftfield: Clint Hartung
- First base: Johnny Mize
- Rightfield: Willard Marshall
- Catcher: Walker Cooper
- Third base: Sid Gordon
- Second base: Bobby Thomson
- Pitcher: Bill Voiselle

=== Notable transactions ===
- April 12, 1947: Jess Pike was released by the Giants.

=== Roster ===
1947 New York Giants
Roster
Pitchers: 37 Woody Abernathy; 38 Nate Andrews; 39 Bill Ayers; 33 Joe Beggs; 40 Mike Budnick; 33 Bob Carpenter; 13,14 Mort Cooper; 44 Andy Hansen; 23 Clint Hartung; 30,35 Hooks Iott; 46 Larry Jansen; 39 Sheldon Jones; 32 Monte Kennedy; 31 Dave Koslo; -- Mario Picone; 30 Ray Poat; 35 Junior Thompson; 34 Ken Trinkle; 30 Bill Voiselle	Catchers: 5 Walker Cooper; 8 Mickey Livingston; 6 Ernie Lombardi; 9 Bennie Warren; -- Wes Westrum; 7 Sal Yvars; Infielders: 12 Buddy Blattner; 10 Buddy Kerr; 16 Jack Lohrke; 15 Johnny Mize; -- Bobby Rhawn; 18 Bill Rigney; 17 Mickey Witek	Outfielders: 21 Gary Gearhart; 20 Sid Gordon; 24 Joe Lafata; 27 Willard Marshall; 19 Bobby Thomson; 28 Fuzz White; Other batters: 25,28 Whitey Lockman; 4 Mel Ott; 14 Babe Young	Manager: 4 Mel Ott; Coaches: 3 Hank Gowdy; 1 Travis Jackson; 2 Red Kress

== Player stats ==
=== Batting ===
==== Starters by position ====
Note: Pos = Position; G = Games played; AB = At bats; H = Hits; Avg. = Batting average; HR = Home runs; RBI = Runs batted in

Pos	Player	G	AB	H	Avg.	HR	RBI
C	Walker Cooper	140	515	157	.305	35	122
1B	Johnny Mize	154	586	177	.302	51	138
2B	Bill Rigney	130	531	142	.267	17	59
3B	Jack Lohrke	112	329	79	.240	11	35
SS	Buddy Kerr	138	547	157	.287	7	49
OF	Sid Gordon	130	437	119	.272	13	57
OF	Willard Marshall	155	587	171	.291	36	107
OF	Bobby Thomson	138	545	154	.283	29	85

==== Other batters ====
Note: G = Games played; AB = At bats; H = Hits; Avg. = Batting average; HR = Home runs; RBI = Runs batted in

Player	G	AB	H	Avg.	HR	RBI
Gary Gearhart	73	179	44	.246	6	17
Mickey Witek	51	160	35	.219	3	17
Buddy Blattner	55	153	40	.261	0	13
Ernie Lombardi	48	110	31	.282	4	21
Joe Lafata	62	95	21	.221	2	18
Bobby Rhawn	13	45	14	.311	1	3
Babe Young	14	14	1	.071	0	0
Fuzz White	7	13	3	.231	0	0
Wes Westrum	6	12	5	.417	0	2
Mickey Livingston	5	6	1	.167	0	0
Bennie Warren	3	5	1	.200	0	0
Sal Yvars	1	5	1	.200	0	0
Mel Ott	4	4	0	.000	0	0
Whitey Lockman	2	2	1	.500	0	1

=== Pitching ===
==== Starting pitchers ====
Note: G = Games pitched; IP = Innings pitched; W = Wins; L = Losses; ERA = Earned run average; SO = Strikeouts

Player	G	IP	W	L	ERA	SO
Larry Jansen	42	248.0	21	5	3.16	104
Dave Koslo	39	217.1	15	10	4.39	86
Clint Hartung	23	138.0	9	7	4.57	54
Ray Poat	7	60.0	4	3	2.55	25
Mort Cooper	8	36.2	1	5	7.12	12

==== Other pitchers ====
Note: G = Games pitched; IP = Innings pitched; W = Wins; L = Losses; ERA = Earned run average; SO = Strikeouts

Player	G	IP	W	L	ERA	SO
Monte Kennedy	34	148.1	9	12	4.85	60
Andy Hansen	27	82.1	1	5	4.37	18
Hooks Iott	20	71.1	3	8	5.93	46
Sheldon Jones	15	55.2	2	2	3.88	24
Bill Voiselle	11	42.2	1	4	4.64	20
Bill Ayers	13	35.1	0	3	8.15	22
Mike Budnick	7	12.0	0	0	10.50	6
Mario Picone	2	7.0	0	0	7.71	1

==== Relief pitchers ====
Note: G = Games pitched; W = Wins; L = Losses; SV = Saves; ERA = Earned run average; SO = Strikeouts

Player	G	W	L	SV	ERA	SO
Ken Trinkle	62	8	4	10	3.75	37
Joe Beggs	32	3	3	2	4.23	23
Gene Thompson	15	4	2	0	4.29	13
Hub Andrews	7	0	0	0	6.23	2
Bob Carpenter	2	0	0	0	12.00	0
Woody Abernathy	1	0	0	0	9.00	0

== Farm system ==
Level	Team	League	Manager
AAA	Minneapolis Millers	American Association	Tom Sheehan
AAA	Jersey City Giants	International League	Bruno Betzel
A	Jacksonville Tars	Sally League	Johnny Hudson
A	Sioux City Soos	Western League	Joe Becker
B	Trenton Giants	Interstate League	Tommy Heath
B	Manchester Giants	New England League	Hal Gruber
B	Richmond Colts	Piedmont League	Bob Latshaw
C	Danville Leafs	Carolina League	Herb Brett and Gene Petty
C	Erie Sailors	Middle Atlantic League	Donald Cross
C	Reno Silver Sox	Sunset League	Tom Lloyd
C	Fort Smith Giants	Western Association	Earl Wolgamot
D	Bristol Twins	Appalachian League	Charlie Fox
D	Seaford Eagles	Eastern Shore League	Robert Westfall
D	Peekskill Highlanders	North Atlantic League	Al Gardella
D	Hickory Rebels	North Carolina State League	Sammy Bell
D	Springfield Giants	Ohio State League	Donald Ramsay
D	Oshkosh Giants	Wisconsin State League	Ray Lucas

LEAGUE CHAMPIONS: Seaford
