= 1947 Cincinnati Reds season =

1947 Cincinnati Reds
- League: National League
- Ballpark: Crosley Field
- City: Cincinnati
- Owners: Powel Crosley Jr.
- General managers: Warren Giles
- Managers: Johnny Neun
- Radio: WCPO (Waite Hoyt)

The 1947 Cincinnati Reds season was a season in American baseball. The team finished fifth in the National League with a record of 73–81, 21 games behind the Brooklyn Dodgers.

== Offseason ==
- November 1, 1946: Virgil Stallcup was drafted by the Reds from the Boston Red Sox in the 1946 rule 5 draft.

== Regular season ==
- May 13: Jackie Robinson played in his first game in Cincinnati. The Reds won the game 7–5 over Robinson and the Dodgers. In the loss, Robinson had a walk, a single, and a run. Laughter, racial slurs and debris were hurled at Robinson by the fans. Dodgers shortstop Pee Wee Reese put his hand on Robinson's shoulder to hush the crowd.

=== Season standings ===
National League
Team	W	L	Pct.	GB	Home	Road
Brooklyn Dodgers	94	60	.610	—	52‍–‍25	42‍–‍35
St. Louis Cardinals	89	65	.578	5	46‍–‍31	43‍–‍34
Boston Braves	86	68	.558	8	50‍–‍27	36‍–‍41
New York Giants	81	73	.526	13	45‍–‍31	36‍–‍42
Cincinnati Reds	73	81	.474	21	42‍–‍35	31‍–‍46
Chicago Cubs	69	85	.448	25	36‍–‍43	33‍–‍42
Philadelphia Phillies	62	92	.403	32	38‍–‍38	24‍–‍54
Pittsburgh Pirates	62	92	.403	32	32‍–‍45	30‍–‍47

=== Record vs. opponents ===
1947 National League record Sources:
Team	BSN	BRO	CHC	CIN	NYG	PHI	PIT	STL
Boston	—	12–10	13–9	13–9	13–9	14–8	12–10	9–13
Brooklyn	10–12	—	15–7	15–7	14–8	14–8	15–7	11–11–1
Chicago	9–13	7–15	—	12–10	7–15	16–6–1	8–14	10–12
Cincinnati	9–13	7–15	10–12	—	13–9	13–9	13–9	8–14
New York	9–13	8–14	15–7	9–13	—	12–10	15–7–1	13–9
Philadelphia	8–14	8–14	6–16–1	9–13	10–12	—	13–9	8–14
Pittsburgh	10–12	7–15	14–8	9–13	7–15–1	9–13	—	6–16–1
St. Louis	13–9	11–11–1	12–10	14–8	9–13	14–8	16–6–1	—

=== Roster ===
1947 Cincinnati Reds
Roster
Pitchers: 43 Joe Beggs; 47 Ewell Blackwell; 34 Eddie Erautt; 41 Harry Gumbert; 40 Johnny Hetki; 32 Clayton Lambert; 37 Buddy Lively; 44 Bob Malloy; 35 Harry Perkowski; 38 Kent Peterson; 42 Ken Polivka; 36 Ken Raffensberger; 48 Elmer Riddle; 35 Mike Schultz; 36 Clyde Shoun; 33 Johnny Vander Meer; 31 Bucky Walters; 45 Herm Wehmeier	Catchers: 5 Ray Lamanno; 7 Ray Mueller; 6 Hugh Poland; Infielders: 12 Bobby Adams; 15 Grady Hatton; 20 Ted Kluszewski; 17 Chuck Kress; 13,14 Eddie Miller; 10 Virgil Stallcup; 19 Kermit Wahl; 17 Babe Young; 16 Benny Zientara	Outfielders: 21 Frank Baumholtz; 23 Augie Galan; 18 Bert Haas; 27 Eddie Lukon; 24 Tommy Tatum; 24 Bob Usher; 25 Clyde Vollmer; Other batters: 4 Al Lakeman	Manager: 1 Johnny Neun; Coaches: 2 George Kelly; 3 Phil Page

== Player stats ==
=== Batting ===
==== Starters by position ====
Note: Pos = Position; G = Games played; AB = At bats; H = Hits; Avg. = Batting average; HR = Home runs; RBI = Runs batted in

Pos	Player	G	AB	H	Avg.	HR	RBI
C	Ray Lamanno	118	413	106	.257	5	50
1B	Babe Young	95	364	103	.283	14	79
2B	Benny Zientara	117	418	108	.258	2	24
SS	Eddie Miller	151	545	146	.268	19	87
3B	Grady Hatton	146	524	147	.281	16	77
OF	Bert Haas	135	482	138	.286	3	67
OF	Augie Galan	124	392	123	.314	6	61
OF	Frank Baumholtz	151	643	182	.283	5	45

==== Other batters ====
Note: G = Games played; AB = At bats; H = Hits; Avg. = Batting average; HR = Home runs; RBI = Runs batted in

Player	G	AB	H	Avg.	HR	RBI
Bobby Adams	81	217	59	.272	4	20
Eddie Lukon	86	200	41	.205	11	33
Ray Mueller	71	192	48	.250	6	33
Tommy Tatum	69	176	48	.273	1	16
Clyde Vollmer	78	155	34	.219	1	13
Kermit Wahl	39	81	14	.173	1	4
Chuck Kress	11	27	4	.148	0	0
Bob Usher	9	22	4	.182	1	1
Hugh Poland	16	18	6	.333	0	2
Ted Kluszewski	9	10	1	.100	0	2
Al Lakeman	2	2	0	.000	0	0
Virgil Stallcup	8	1	0	.000	0	0

=== Pitching ===
==== Starting pitchers ====
Note: G = Games pitched; IP = Innings pitched; W = Wins; L = Losses; ERA = Earned run average; SO = Strikeouts

Player	G	IP	W	L	ERA	SO
Ewell Blackwell	33	273.0	22	8	2.47	193
Johnny Vander Meer	30	186.0	9	14	4.40	79
Bucky Walters	20	122.0	8	8	5.75	43
Ken Raffensberger	19	106.2	6	5	4.13	38

==== Other pitchers ====
Note: G = Games pitched; IP = Innings pitched; W = Wins; L = Losses; ERA = Earned run average; SO = Strikeouts

Player	G	IP	W	L	ERA	SO
Kent Peterson	37	152.1	6	13	4.25	78
Buddy Lively	38	123.0	4	7	4.68	52
Eddie Erautt	36	119.0	4	9	5.07	43
Joe Beggs	11	32.1	0	3	5.29	11
Elmer Riddle	16	30.1	1	0	8.31	8
Harry Perkowski	3	7.1	0	0	3.68	2

==== Relief pitchers ====
Note: G = Games pitched; W = Wins; L = Losses; SV = Saves; ERA = Earned run average; SO = Strikeouts

Player	G	W	L	SV	ERA	SO
Harry Gumbert	46	10	10	10	3.89	43
Johnny Hetki	37	3	4	0	5.81	33
Clyde Shoun	10	0	0	0	5.02	7
Clayton Lambert	3	0	0	0	15.88	1
Ken Polivka	2	0	0	0	3.00	1
Mike Schultz	1	0	0	0	4.50	0
Bob Malloy	1	0	0	0	18.00	1
Herm Wehmeier	1	0	0	0	0.00	0

== Farm system ==
Level	Team	League	Manager
AAA	Syracuse Chiefs	International League	Jewel Ens
A	Columbia Reds	Sally League	Gee Walker
B	Providence Chiefs	New England League	Buzz Boyle
C	Rockford Rox	Central Association	Cyril Pfeifer
C	Tyler Trojans	Lone Star League	Hack Miller
C	Ogden Reds	Pioneer League	Pip Koehler
D	Muncie Reds	Ohio State League	Mike Blazo
D	Lockport Reds	PONY League	Cecil Scheffel

LEAGUE CHAMPIONS: Syracuse
