= 1947 Pittsburgh Pirates season =

1947 Pittsburgh Pirates
- League: National League
- Ballpark: Forbes Field
- City: Pittsburgh, Pennsylvania
- Owners: Frank E. McKinney, John W. Galbreath, Bing Crosby, Thomas P. Johnson
- General managers: Roy Hamey
- Managers: Billy Herman, Bill Burwell
- Radio: WWSW; Rosey Rowswell, Jack Craddock

The 1947 Pittsburgh Pirates season was the 66th season of the Pittsburgh Pirates franchise; the 61st in the National League. The Pirates finished tied with the Philadelphia Phillies for eighth and last in the league standings with a record of 62–92. It was the last season the Pirates used red and blue as their team colors, as they switched to Black and Gold for the following season, and they haven't changed them ever since.

== Offseason ==
- October 2, 1946: Steve Nagy was purchased by the Pirates from the Brooklyn Dodgers.
- Prior to 1947 season (exact date unknown)
  - Joe Muir was signed as an amateur free agent by the Pirates.
  - Tod Davis was returned by the Pirates to the Hollywood Stars after the expiration of their minor league working agreement.

== Regular season ==
- June 24: Against the Pirates, Jackie Robinson of the Brooklyn Dodgers stole home plate for the first time in his career. The Pirates catcher was Dixie Howell.

=== Season standings ===
National League
Team	W	L	Pct.	GB	Home	Road
Brooklyn Dodgers	94	60	.610	—	52‍–‍25	42‍–‍35
St. Louis Cardinals	89	65	.578	5	46‍–‍31	43‍–‍34
Boston Braves	86	68	.558	8	50‍–‍27	36‍–‍41
New York Giants	81	73	.526	13	45‍–‍31	36‍–‍42
Cincinnati Reds	73	81	.474	21	42‍–‍35	31‍–‍46
Chicago Cubs	69	85	.448	25	36‍–‍43	33‍–‍42
Philadelphia Phillies	62	92	.403	32	38‍–‍38	24‍–‍54
Pittsburgh Pirates	62	92	.403	32	32‍–‍45	30‍–‍47

=== Record vs. opponents ===
1947 National League record Sources:
Team	BSN	BRO	CHC	CIN	NYG	PHI	PIT	STL
Boston	—	12–10	13–9	13–9	13–9	14–8	12–10	9–13
Brooklyn	10–12	—	15–7	15–7	14–8	14–8	15–7	11–11–1
Chicago	9–13	7–15	—	12–10	7–15	16–6–1	8–14	10–12
Cincinnati	9–13	7–15	10–12	—	13–9	13–9	13–9	8–14
New York	9–13	8–14	15–7	9–13	—	12–10	15–7–1	13–9
Philadelphia	8–14	8–14	6–16–1	9–13	10–12	—	13–9	8–14
Pittsburgh	10–12	7–15	14–8	9–13	7–15–1	9–13	—	6–16–1
St. Louis	13–9	11–11–1	12–10	14–8	9–13	14–8	16–6–1	—

=== Game log ===
1947 Game Log: 62–92 (Home: 32–45; Away: 30–47)
April: 8–5 (Home: 3–2; Away: 5–3)

#	Date	Opponent	Score	Win	Loss	Save	Attendance	Record
1	April 15	@ Cubs	1–0	**Sewell** (1–0)	Borowy	—	29,427	1–0
2	April 17	@ Cubs	7–1	**Roe** (1–0)	Wyse	—	9,749	2–0
3	April 18	Reds	12–11	**Ostermueller** (1–0)	Beggs	**Bonham** (1)	38,216	3–0
4	April 19	Reds	6–1	**Strincevich** (1–0)	Lively	—	21,891	4–0
5	April 20	Reds	5–13	Blackwell	**Bahr** (0–1)	—		4–1
6	April 20	Reds	7–3 (6)	**Sewell** (2–0)	Erautt	—	40,784	5–1
7	April 23	@ Cardinals	8–5	**Bahr** (1–1)	Burkhart	—	6,832	6–1
8	April 24	Cubs	5–6	Borowy	**Roe** (1–1)	Kush	6,889	6–2
9	April 26	@ Reds	2–3	Gumbert	**Nagy** (0–1)	—	11,316	6–3
10	April 27	@ Reds	1–6	Walters	**Sewell** (2–1)	—		6–4
11	April 27	@ Reds	1–2 (12)	Hetki	**Ostermueller** (1–1)	—	36,961	6–5
12	April 29	@ Phillies	6–2	**Bahr** (2–1)	Raffensberger	—	7,386	7–5
13	April 30	@ Phillies	11–4	**Bonham** (1–0)	Hughes	—	6,576	8–5

May: 9–12 (Home: 7–4; Away: 2–8)

#	Date	Opponent	Score	Win	Loss	Save	Attendance	Record
14	May 6	@ Braves	0–6	Sain	**Higbe** (0–1)	—	29,631	8–6
15	May 7	@ Braves	2–3	Karl	**Behrman** (0–1)	—	11,175	8–7
16	May 8	@ Braves	5–12	Beazley	**Strincevich** (1–1)	—	4,560	8–8
17	May 10	Cardinals	3–0	**Ostermueller** (2–1)	Dickson	—	12,579	9–8
18	May 11	Cardinals	6–10 (10)	Hearn	**Nagy** (0–2)	—		9–9
19	May 11	Cardinals	3–3 (7)			—	29,315	9–9
20	May 15	Dodgers	7–3	**Bahr** (3–1)	Lombardi	**Bonham** (2)	13,471	10–9
21	May 16	Dodgers	1–3	Branca	**Higbe** (0–2)	Casey	34,184	10–10
22	May 17	Dodgers	4–0	**Ostermueller** (3–1)	Melton	—	17,673	11–10
23	May 18	Giants	7–6	**Singleton** (1–0)	Trinkle	—		12–10
24	May 18	Giants	6–11 (7)	Thompson	**Strincevich** (1–2)	Ayers	32,996	12–11
25	May 20	Braves	4–3 (10)	**Bonham** (2–0)	Karl	—	37,175	13–11
26	May 22	@ Cardinals	1–4	Pollet	**Higbe** (0–3)	—	14,035	13–12
27	May 23	@ Cardinals	0–2	Munger	**Roe** (1–2)	—	12,722	13–13
28	May 25	@ Cardinals	5–10	Brazle	**Behrman** (0–2)	—		13–14
29	May 25	@ Cardinals	2–1	**Ostermueller** (4–1)	Hearn	—	26,817	14–14
30	May 26	@ Reds	5–1	**Higbe** (1–3)	Walters	**Herring** (1)	19,967	15–14
31	May 27	@ Reds	1–6	Blackwell	**Bahr** (3–2)	—	2,974	15–15
32	May 28	Cubs	7–6	**Herring** (1–0)	Kush	—	30,339	16–15
33	May 30	Cubs	2–1 (10)	**Roe** (2–2)	Erickson	—		17–15
34	May 30	Cubs	2–5	Borowy	**Higbe** (1–4)	—	37,451	17–16
35	May 31	@ Giants	9–10	Trinkle	**Herring** (1–1)	—	32,905	17–17

June: 8–21 (Home: 2–9; Away: 6–12)

#	Date	Opponent	Score	Win	Loss	Save	Attendance	Record
36	June 1	@ Braves	0–2	Sain	**Bahr** (3–3)	—		17–18
37	June 1	@ Braves	7–8 (10)	Cooper	**Bagby** (0–1)	—	30,656	17–19
38	June 2	@ Braves	4–3	**Sewell** (3–1)	Johnson	**Herring** (2)	5,831	18–19
39	June 3	@ Dodgers	6–11	Barney	**Higbe** (1–5)	Casey		18–20
40	June 3	@ Dodgers	7–8	Barney	**Roe** (2–3)	—	27,244	18–21
41	June 4	@ Dodgers	4–9	Branca	**Singleton** (1–1)	—	32,287	18–22
42	June 5	@ Dodgers	0–3	Taylor	**Ostermueller** (4–2)	—	24,977	18–23
43	June 6	@ Phillies	3–4	Schmidt	**Herring** (1–2)	—	12,421	18–24
44	June 8	@ Phillies	2–5	Leonard	**Strincevich** (1–3)	—		18–25
45	June 8	@ Phillies	5–4	**Bonham** (3–0)	Donnelly	—	18,551	19–25
46	June 9	@ Giants	10–13	Jansen	**Herring** (1–3)	—	13,069	19–26
47	June 10	@ Giants	2–3 (12)	Thompson	**Bonham** (3–1)	—	39,690	19–27
48	June 11	@ Giants	8–7	**Ostermueller** (5–2)	Beggs	**Higbe** (1)	13,222	20–27
49	June 12	Cubs	3–7	Erickson	**Bahr** (3–4)	Schmitz	32,132	20–28
50	June 13	Braves	2–6	Barrett	**Sewell** (3–2)	—	6,314	20–29
51	June 15	Braves	4–13	Spahn	**Strincevich** (1–4)	—		20–30
52	June 15	Braves	3–12	Sain	**Roe** (2–4)	—	29,062	20–31
53	June 18	Giants	5–12	Jansen	**Ostermueller** (5–3)	—	3,661	20–32
54	June 19	Giants	12–2	**Higbe** (2–5)	Cooper	—	8,779	21–32
55	June 20	Phillies	6–0	**Bonham** (4–1)	Rowe	—	27,683	22–32
56	June 21	Phillies	1–5	Leonard	**Bagby** (0–2)	—	11,144	22–33
57	June 22	Phillies	3–4 (13)	Jurisich	**Higbe** (2–6)	Mauney	25,392	22–34
58	June 24	Dodgers	2–4	Branca	**Ostermueller** (5–4)	—	35,331	22–35
59	June 25	Dodgers	2–6	Taylor	**Higbe** (2–7)	—	10,313	22–36
60	June 26	@ Cubs	8–0	**Bonham** (5–1)	Lade	—	10,654	23–36
61	June 27	@ Cubs	12–8	**Bagby** (1–2)	Lee	**Higbe** (2)	9,725	24–36
62	June 28	@ Cubs	2–6	Meyer	**Roe** (2–5)	—		24–37
63	June 28	@ Cubs	5–6	Lade	**Wolff** (0–1)	—	37,111	24–38
64	June 29	@ Cubs	10–4	**Higbe** (3–7)	Passeau	—	27,385	25–38

July: 15–18 (Home: 8–9; Away: 7–9)

#	Date	Opponent	Score	Win	Loss	Save	Attendance	Record
65	July 1	Cardinals	1–2	Hearn	**Bonham** (5–2)	—	37,844	25–39
66	July 2	Reds	6–8	Gumbert	**Ostermueller** (5–5)	—	23,384	25–40
67	July 3	Reds	7–3	**Bagby** (2–2)	Hetki	—	8,610	26–40
68	July 4	@ Reds	0–8	Blackwell	**Roe** (2–6)	—		26–41
69	July 4	@ Reds	4–6	Gumbert	**Bahr** (3–5)	—	19,282	26–42
70	July 5	Cubs	3–4	Lade	**Sewell** (3–3)	—	12,340	26–43
71	July 6	Cubs	6–2	**Bonham** (6–2)	Erickson	**Higbe** (3)		27–43
72	July 6	Cubs	10–0	**Ostermueller** (6–5)	Meyer	—	25,776	28–43
73	July 10	@ Phillies	2–7	Leonard	**Bagby** (2–3)	—	12,044	28–44
74	July 10	@ Phillies	1–2	Hughes	**Higbe** (3–8)	—	12,044	28–45
75	July 11	@ Phillies	7–2	**Bonham** (7–2)	Schanz	—	12,670	29–45
76	July 12	@ Phillies	2–4	Rowe	**Sewell** (3–4)	Donnelly	8,035	29–46
77	July 13	@ Giants	6–3	**Ostermueller** (7–5)	Cooper	—		30–46
78	July 13	@ Giants	1–3	Jansen	**Roe** (2–7)	—	30,166	30–47
79	July 14	@ Giants	1–5	Hartung	**Higbe** (3–9)	—	8,631	30–48
80	July 15	@ Dodgers	12–4	**Roe** (3–7)	Taylor	—		31–48
81	July 15	@ Dodgers	9–3	**Bagby** (3–3)	Hatten	—	25,594	32–48
82	July 16	@ Dodgers	6–10	Behrman	**Bonham** (7–3)	Taylor	27,756	32–49
83	July 17	@ Dodgers	7–1	**Queen** (1–0)	King	—	9,133	33–49
84	July 18	@ Braves	2–1	**Higbe** (4–9)	Voiselle	—	19,628	34–49
85	July 19	@ Braves	0–2	Sain	**Roe** (3–8)	—	22,584	34–50
86	July 20	@ Braves	9–1	**Ostermueller** (8–5)	Spahn	—	15,675	35–50
87	July 21	Phillies	1–8	Leonard	**Wolff** (0–2)	—	12,631	35–51
88	July 23	Phillies	6–2	**Bonham** (8–3)	Jurisich	—	27,563	36–51
89	July 24	Phillies	8–6	**Sewell** (4–4)	Schmidt	—	12,631	37–51
90	July 24	Phillies	3–2	**Higbe** (5–9)	Rowe	**Roe** (1)	15,433	38–51
91	July 25	Dodgers	1–4	Taylor	**Queen** (1–1)	—	42,014	38–52
92	July 26	Dodgers	4–6	Casey	**Strincevich** (1–5)	—	17,606	38–53
93	July 27	Dodgers	4–8	Behrman	**Ostermueller** (8–6)	Casey		38–54
94	July 27	Dodgers	4–11 (7)	Gregg	**Higbe** (5–10)	—	42,716	38–55
95	July 29	Braves	6–5	**Bonham** (9–3)	Voiselle	—	20,186	39–55
96	July 30	Braves	5–3	**Higbe** (6–10)	Barrett	—	12,672	40–55
97	July 30	Braves	5–8	Wright	**Roe** (3–9)	Karl	12,672	40–56

August: 14–18 (Home: 5–6; Away: 9–12)

#	Date	Opponent	Score	Win	Loss	Save	Attendance	Record
98	August 1	Giants	1–2	Koslo	**Queen** (1–2)	—	28,855	40–57
99	August 2	Giants	2–10	Jansen	**Wolff** (0–3)	—		40–58
100	August 2	Giants	5–4	**Ostermueller** (9–6)	Iott	—	19,196	41–58
101	August 3	Giants	8–11	Kennedy	**Roe** (3–10)	Trinkle		41–59
102	August 3	Giants	6–6 (8)			—	26,490	41–59
103	August 4	Reds	4–7	Walters	**Bonham** (9–4)	Gumbert	19,883	41–60
104	August 5	Reds	12–4	**Queen** (2–2)	Lively	**Higbe** (4)	6,229	42–60
105	August 6	@ Cubs	7–2	**Wolff** (1–3)	Erickson	—	9,086	43–60
106	August 7	@ Cubs	3–0	**Higbe** (7–10)	Borowy	—	7,766	44–60
107	August 8	@ Cardinals	0–6	Munger	**Ostermueller** (9–7)	—	21,872	44–61
108	August 9	@ Cardinals	5–4	**Higbe** (8–10)	Pollet	—	20,320	45–61
109	August 10	@ Cardinals	0–5	Dickson	**Roe** (3–11)	—		45–62
110	August 10	@ Cardinals	5–7	Burkhart	**Bonham** (9–5)	Dickson	25,482	45–63
111	August 11	@ Reds	3–8	Walters	**Wolff** (1–4)	—	12,832	45–64
112	August 12	@ Reds	3–2 (12)	**Lyons** (1–0)	Peterson	—	5,730	46–64
113	August 13	Cubs	10–2	**Queen** (3–2)	Erickson	**Bonham** (3)	5,111	47–64
114	August 14	Cardinals	5–3	**Ostermueller** (10–7)	Dickson	—	19,197	48–64
115	August 15	Cardinals	4–7	Munger	**Bonham** (9–6)	Wilks	35,344	48–65
116	August 16	Cardinals	12–7	**Bagby** (4–3)	Burkhart	—	6,435	49–65
117	August 17	Cardinals	5–6	Hearn	**Higbe** (8–11)	Brazle	36,000	49–66
118	August 19	@ Braves	5–7	Lanfranconi	**Lyons** (1–1)	—	23,192	49–67
119	August 20	@ Braves	16–10	**Ostermueller** (11–7)	Sain	—	24,638	50–67
120	August 21	@ Giants	1–4	Hartung	**Higbe** (8–12)	—	20,700	50–68
121	August 22	@ Giants	7–8	Trinkle	**Lyons** (1–2)	Beggs	8,773	50–69
122	August 23	@ Giants	11–10	**Bagby** (5–3)	Beggs	**Higbe** (5)		51–69
123	August 23	@ Giants	4–0	**Roe** (4–11)	Hansen	—	32,211	52–69
124	August 24	@ Dodgers	1–3	Branca	**Bonham** (9–7)	Casey	33,207	52–70
125	August 25	@ Dodgers	10–11	King	**Higbe** (8–13)	Casey		52–71
126	August 26	@ Dodgers	16–3	**Ostermueller** (12–7)	Gregg	—	24,069	53–71
127	August 27	@ Phillies	3–4	Leonard	**Queen** (3–3)	—	7,537	53–72
128	August 28	@ Phillies	0–7	Rowe	**Singleton** (1–2)	—	8,202	53–73
129	August 30	@ Cubs	8–5	**Bonham** (10–7)	Erickson	**Roe** (2)	27,523	54–73
130	August 31	@ Cubs	3–6	Lade	**Strincevich** (1–6)	—	22,925	54–74

September: 8–18 (Home: 7–15; Away: 1–3)

#	Date	Opponent	Score	Win	Loss	Save	Attendance	Record
131	September 1	@ Cardinals	5–6 (10)	Dickson	**Ostermueller** (12–8)	—		54–75
132	September 1	@ Cardinals	2–8	Hearn	**Roe** (4–12)	—	30,095	54–76
133	September 3	Reds	6–13	Blackwell	**Higbe** (8–14)	—	37,299	54–77
134	September 4	Reds	5–7	Gumbert	**Queen** (3–4)	—	3,682	54–78
135	September 6	Cubs	7–6 (10)	**Sewell** (5–4)	Erickson	—	6,037	55–78
136	September 7	Cubs	3–4	Lade	**Higbe** (8–15)	—	11,930	55–79
137	September 8	Giants	8–10	Trinkle	**Bagby** (5–4)	—	3,936	55–80
138	September 9	Giants	1–3	Hartung	**Roe** (4–13)	—	20,008	55–81
139	September 10	Giants	2–3	Jansen	**Queen** (3–5)	—	3,557	55–82
140	September 11	Braves	4–3 (13)	**Higbe** (9–15)	Sain	—	7,010	56–82
141	September 11	Braves	10–8	**Singleton** (2–2)	Lanfranconi	—	7,010	57–82
142	September 12	Braves	4–3	**Sewell** (6–4)	Barrett	—	21,012	58–82
143	September 13	Braves	1–8	Johnson	**Roe** (4–14)	—	10,721	58–83
144	September 14	Phillies	3–7	Leonard	**Bonham** (10–8)	—		58–84
145	September 14	Phillies	7–9	Rowe	**Queen** (3–6)	—	24,279	58–85
146	September 15	Phillies	12–2	**Higbe** (10–15)	Hughes	—	2,833	59–85
147	September 16	Phillies	1–2	Donnelly	**Queen** (3–7)	—	2,568	59–86
148	September 17	Dodgers	2–4	Gregg	**Ostermueller** (12–9)	Behrman	33,916	59–87
149	September 18	Dodgers	8–7	**Higbe** (11–15)	King	—	15,440	60–87
150	September 21	@ Reds	1–3	Blackwell	**Higbe** (11–16)	—		60–88
151	September 21	@ Reds	11–7 (8)	**Nagy** (1–2)	Gumbert	—	15,975	61–88
152	September 23	Cardinals	4–8	Hearn	**Ostermueller** (12–10)	Wilks	10,330	61–89
153	September 24	Cardinals	1–5	Munger	**Roe** (4–15)	—	11,658	61–90
154	September 25	Cardinals	3–15	Dickson	**Higbe** (11–17)	—	7,155	61–91
155	September 25	Cardinals	1–3	Staley	**Nagy** (1–3)	—	7,155	61–92
156	September 28	Reds	7–0	**Bonham** (11–8)	Lively	—	33,704	62–92

Legend: = Win = Loss = Tie
Bold = Pirates team member

=== Notable transactions ===
- July 23, 1947: Frank Thomas was signed as an amateur free agent by the Pirates.
- September 23, 1947: Joe Grace was selected off waivers by the Pirates from the Washington Senators.

=== Roster ===
1947 Pittsburgh Pirates
**Roster**
**Pitchers**: 36 Jim Bagby; 24 Ed Bahr; 18 Hank Behrman; 35 Tiny Bonham; 25 Ken Gables; 20 Ken Heintzelman; 27 Art Herring; 13 Kirby Higbe; -- Lee Howard; 2 Al Lyons; 28,40 Cal McLish; 19 Hugh Mulcahy; 28 Steve Nagy; 21 Fritz Ostermueller; 23 Mel Queen; 29 Preacher Roe; 30 Rip Sewell; 26 Elmer Singleton; 22 Nick Strincevich; 23 Lou Tost; 32 Roger Wolff	**Catchers**: 1 Dixie Howell; 31 Roy Jarvis; 10 Clyde Kluttz; 1,2 Bill Salkeld; 14,42 Billy Sullivan; **Infielders**: 8 Eddie Basinski; 2,19 Jimmy Bloodworth; 9 Pete Castiglione; 6 Billy Cox; 3 Elbie Fletcher; 5 Hank Greenberg; 16 Frankie Gustine; 11 Billy Herman; 19,42 Gene Mauch; 7 Whitey Wietelmann	**Outfielders**: 4 Ralph Kiner; 12 Culley Rikard; 17 Jim Russell; 15 Wally Westlake; 14 Gene Woodling; **Other batters**: 18 Al Gionfriddo	**Manager**: 39 Bill Burwell; 11 Billy Herman; **Coaches**: 39 Bill Burwell; 37 Johnny McKee; 38 Zack Taylor; 33 Honus Wagner

== Player stats ==
=== Batting ===
==== Starters by position ====
Note: Pos = Position; G = Games played; AB = At bats; H = Hits; Avg. = Batting average; HR = Home runs; RBI = Runs batted in

Pos	Player	G	AB	H	Avg.	HR	RBI
C	Dixie Howell	76	214	59	.276	4	25
1B	Hank Greenberg	125	402	100	.249	25	74
2B	Jimmy Bloodworth	88	316	79	.250	7	48
SS	Billy Cox	132	529	145	.274	15	54
3B	Frankie Gustine	156	616	183	.297	9	67
OF	Ralph Kiner	152	565	177	.313	51	127
OF	Wally Westlake	112	407	111	.273	17	69
OF	Jim Russell	128	478	121	.253	8	51

==== Other batters ====
Note: G = Games played; AB = At bats; H = Hits; Avg. = Batting average; HR = Home runs; RBI = Runs batted in

Player	G	AB	H	Avg.	HR	RBI
Culley Rikard	109	324	93	.287	4	32
Clyde Kluttz	73	232	70	.302	6	42
Eddie Basinski	56	161	32	.199	4	17
Elbie Fletcher	69	157	38	.242	1	22
Whitey Wietelmann	48	128	30	.234	1	7
Gene Woodling	22	79	21	.266	0	10
Bill Salkeld	47	61	13	.213	0	8
Billy Sullivan	38	55	14	.255	0	8
Pete Castiglione	13	50	14	.280	0	1
Billy Herman	15	47	10	.213	0	6
Roy Jarvis	18	45	7	.156	1	4
Gene Mauch	16	30	9	.300	0	1
Al Gionfriddo	1	1	0	.000	0	0

=== Pitching ===
==== Starting pitchers ====
Note: G = Games pitched; IP = Innings pitched; W = Wins; L = Losses; ERA = Earned run average; SO = Strikeouts

Player	G	IP	W	L	ERA	SO
Fritz Ostermueller	26	183.0	12	10	3.84	66
Mel Queen	14	74.0	3	7	4.01	34

==== Other pitchers ====
Note: G = Games pitched; IP = Innings pitched; W = Wins; L = Losses; ERA = Earned run average; SO = Strikeouts

Player	G	IP	W	L	ERA	SO
Kirby Higbe	46	225.0	11	17	3.72	99
Tiny Bonham	33	149.2	11	8	3.85	63
Preacher Roe	38	144.0	4	15	5.25	59
Rip Sewell	24	121.0	6	4	3.57	36
Nick Strincevich	32	89.0	1	6	5.26	22
Ed Bahr	19	82.1	3	5	4.59	25
Roger Wolff	13	30.0	1	4	8.70	7
Hank Behrman	10	24.2	0	2	9.12	11
Steve Nagy	6	14.0	1	3	5.79	4
Hugh Mulcahy	2	6.2	0	0	4.05	2
Ken Heintzelman	2	4.0	0	0	20.25	2

==== Relief pitchers ====
Note: G = Games pitched; W = Wins; L = Losses; SV = Saves; ERA = Earned run average; SO = Strikeouts

Player	G	W	L	SV	ERA	SO
Jim Bagby	37	5	4	0	4.67	23
Elmer Singleton	36	2	2	1	6.31	24
Al Lyons	13	1	2	0	7.31	16
Art Herring	11	1	3	2	8.44	6
Lee Howard	2	0	0	0	3.38	2
Lou Tost	1	0	0	0	9.00	0
Cal McLish	1	0	0	0	18.00	0
Ken Gables	1	0	0	0	54.00	0

== Farm system ==
Level	Team	League	Manager
AAA	Indianapolis Indians	American Association	Jimmy Brown
A	Albany Senators	Eastern League	Pinky May
B	York White Roses	Interstate League	Ed Turchin
B	Selma Cloverleafs	Southeastern League	Carl Fischer and Boom-Boom Beck
C	Keokuk Pirates	Central Association	Frank Oceak
C	Uniontown Coal Barons	Middle Atlantic League	Alex Stutzke
C	Fargo-Moorhead Twins	Northern League	Bruno Haas
C	Riverside Dons	Sunset League	Norm DeWeese and Jack Rothrock
D	Rehoboth Beach Pirates	Eastern Shore League	Gordon McKinnon and Doug Peden
D	Leesburg Pirates	Florida State League	Wilbur Good, Jr.
D	Tallahassee Pirates	Georgia–Florida League	Phil Seghi
D	Bartlesville Oilers	Kansas–Oklahoma–Missouri League	Charles Marleau
D	Salisbury Pirates	North Carolina State League	Edgar Leip
D	Hornell Pirates	PONY League	Art Doll
