= 1947 Boston Braves season =

1947 Boston Braves
- League: National League
- Ballpark: Braves Field
- City: Boston, Massachusetts
- Record: 86–68 (.558)
- League place: 3rd
- Owners: Louis R. Perini
- General managers: John J. Quinn
- Managers: Billy Southworth
- Radio: WHDH (Jim Britt, Tom Hussey)

The 1947 Boston Braves season was the 77th season of the franchise. They finished in third place with an 86-68 win-loss record, 8 games behind the Brooklyn Dodgers.

== Offseason ==
- Prior to 1947 season (exact date unknown)
  - Jack Daniels was acquired by the Braves from the Bloomingdale Troopers.
  - Carl Sawatski was acquired by the Braves from the Philadelphia Phillies.

== Regular season ==
On April 15, the Braves played against the Brooklyn Dodgers in Jackie Robinson's first game. Johnny Sain threw the first pitch against Robinson. Behind 3–2, Robinson scored the game-winning run against the Braves. The final score was 5–3 for Brooklyn.

Bob Elliott became the first third baseman in the history of the National League to win the MVP Award.

=== Season standings ===
National League
Team	W	L	Pct.	GB	Home	Road
Brooklyn Dodgers	94	60	.610	—	52‍–‍25	42‍–‍35
St. Louis Cardinals	89	65	.578	5	46‍–‍31	43‍–‍34
Boston Braves	86	68	.558	8	50‍–‍27	36‍–‍41
New York Giants	81	73	.526	13	45‍–‍31	36‍–‍42
Cincinnati Reds	73	81	.474	21	42‍–‍35	31‍–‍46
Chicago Cubs	69	85	.448	25	36‍–‍43	33‍–‍42
Philadelphia Phillies	62	92	.403	32	38‍–‍38	24‍–‍54
Pittsburgh Pirates	62	92	.403	32	32‍–‍45	30‍–‍47

=== Record vs. opponents ===
1947 National League record Sources:
Team	BSN	BRO	CHC	CIN	NYG	PHI	PIT	STL
Boston	—	12–10	13–9	13–9	13–9	14–8	12–10	9–13
Brooklyn	10–12	—	15–7	15–7	14–8	14–8	15–7	11–11–1
Chicago	9–13	7–15	—	12–10	7–15	16–6–1	8–14	10–12
Cincinnati	9–13	7–15	10–12	—	13–9	13–9	13–9	8–14
New York	9–13	8–14	15–7	9–13	—	12–10	15–7–1	13–9
Philadelphia	8–14	8–14	6–16–1	9–13	10–12	—	13–9	8–14
Pittsburgh	10–12	7–15	14–8	9–13	7–15–1	9–13	—	6–16–1
St. Louis	13–9	11–11–1	12–10	14–8	9–13	14–8	16–6–1	—

=== Roster ===
1947 Boston Braves
Roster
Pitchers: 25 Red Barrett; 27 Johnny Beazley; 13 Mort Cooper; 37 Glenn Elliott; 36 Si Johnson; 18,24 Andy Karl; 34 Walt Lanfranconi; 24 Johnny Lanning; 20 Max Macon; 24 Ray Martin; 32 Dick Mulligan; 33 Johnny Sain; 26 Clyde Shoun; 21 Warren Spahn; 96 Bill Voiselle; 29 Ernie White; 16 Ed Wright	Catchers: 22 Hank Camelli; 10 Phil Masi; Infielders: 14 Dick Culler; 3 Bob Elliott; 11 Nanny Fernandez; 6 Frank McCormick; 15 Danny Murtaugh; 8 Connie Ryan; 7 Sibby Sisti; 9 Earl Torgeson	Outfielders: 1 Tommy Holmes; 12 Johnny Hopp; 7 Danny Litwhiler; 31 Mike McCormick; 2 Tommy Neill; 5 Bama Rowell; Other batters: 23 Bob Brady	Manager: 30 Billy Southworth; Coaches: 20 Ray Berres; 28 Johnny Cooney; 35 Bob Keely; 29 Ernie White

== Player stats ==
=== Batting ===
==== Starters by position ====
Note: Pos = Position; G = Games played; AB = At bats; H = Hits; Avg. = Batting average; HR = Home runs; RBI = Runs batted in

Pos	Player	G	AB	H	Avg.	HR	RBI
C	Phil Masi	126	411	125	.304	9	50
1B	Earl Torgeson	128	399	112	.281	16	78
2B	Connie Ryan	150	544	144	.265	5	69
3B	Bob Elliott	150	555	176	.317	22	113
SS	Dick Culler	77	214	53	.248	0	19
OF	Bama Rowell	113	384	106	.276	5	40
OF	Tommy Holmes	150	618	191	.309	9	53
OF	Johnny Hopp	134	430	124	.288	2	32

==== Other batters ====
Note: G = Games played; AB = At bats; H = Hits; Avg. = Batting average; HR = Home runs; RBI = Runs batted in

Player	G	AB	H	Avg.	HR	RBI
Mike McCormick	92	284	81	.285	3	36
Danny Litwhiler	91	226	59	.261	7	31
Frank McCormick	81	212	75	.354	2	43
Nanny Fernandez	83	209	43	.288	2	32
Sibby Sisti	56	153	43	.281	2	15
Hank Camelli	52	150	29	.193	1	11
Tommy Neill	7	10	2	.200	0	0
Danny Murtaugh	3	8	1	.125	0	0
Bob Brady	1	1	0	.000	0	0

=== Pitching ===
==== Starting pitchers ====
Note: G = Games pitched; IP = Innings pitched; W = Wins; L = Losses; ERA = Earned run average; SO = Strikeouts

Player	G	IP	W	L	ERA	SO
Warren Spahn	40	289.2	21	10	2.33	123
Johnny Sain	38	266.0	21	12	3.52	132
Red Barrett	36	210.2	11	12	3.55	53
Bill Voiselle	22	131.1	8	7	4.32	59
Ray Martin	1	9.0	1	0	1.00	2
Ernie White	1	4.0	0	0	0.00	1

==== Other pitchers ====
Note: G = Games pitched; IP = Innings pitched; W = Wins; L = Losses; ERA = Earned run average; SO = Strikeouts

Player	G	IP	W	L	ERA	SO
Si Johnson	36	112.2	6	8	4.23	27
Ed Wright	23	64.2	3	3	6.40	14
Mort Cooper	10	46.2	2	5	4.05	15
Johnny Beazley	9	28.2	2	0	4.40	12

==== Relief pitchers ====
Note: G = Games pitched; W = Wins; L = Losses; SV = Saves; ERA = Earned run average; SO = Strikeouts

Player	G	W	L	SV	ERA	SO
Andy Karl	27	2	3	3	3.86	5
Walt Lanfranconi	36	4	4	1	2.95	18
Clyde Shoun	26	5	3	1	4.40	23
Glenn Elliott	11	0	1	1	4.74	8
Johnny Lanning	3	0	0	0	9.82	0
Dick Mulligan	1	0	0	0	9.00	1
Max Macon	1	0	0	0	0.00	1

== Awards and honors ==
- Bob Elliott, National League MVP

== Farm system ==
Level	Team	League	Manager
AAA	Milwaukee Brewers	American Association	Nick Cullop
AA	Little Rock Travelers	Southern Association	Bill Dickey
A	Hartford Chiefs	Eastern League	Dutch Dorman
B	Evansville Braves	Illinois–Indiana–Iowa League	Bob Coleman
B	Pawtucket Slaters	New England League	Pete Fox
B	Jackson Senators	Southeastern League	Willis Hudlin
C	Fort Lauderdale Braves	Florida International League	Jimmy Zinn and Walter Kopp
C	Eau Claire Bears	Northern League	Hughie Wise
C	Las Vegas Ramblers	Sunset League	Newell Kimball
C	Amarillo Gold Sox	West Texas–New Mexico League	Harry Lamprich
C	Leavenworth Braves	Western Association	Joe Bowman
D	Bluefield Blue-Grays	Appalachian League	George Lacy
D	Mount Vernon Braves	Illinois State League	Otto Huber
D	Owensboro Oilers	KITTY League	Earl Browne
D	Bloomingdale Troopers	North Atlantic League	Harold Scinski and Stephen Kuk
D	Richmond Roses	Ohio State League	Rex Carr

LEAGUE CHAMPIONS: Milwaukee
