= 1947 Chicago Cubs season =

1947 Chicago Cubs
- League: National League
- Ballpark: Wrigley Field
- City: Chicago
- Record: 69–85 (.448)
- League place: 6th
- Owners: Philip K. Wrigley
- General managers: James T. Gallagher
- Managers: Charlie Grimm
- Television: WBKB (Jack Brickhouse, Joe Wilson)
- Radio: WIND (Bert Wilson)

The 1947 Chicago Cubs season was the 76th season of the Chicago Cubs franchise, the 72nd in the National League and the 32nd at Wrigley Field. The Cubs finished sixth in the National League with a record of 69–85.

== Offseason ==
- November 21, 1946: Jim Brosnan was signed as an amateur free agent by the Cubs.

== Regular season ==
- May 18: 46,572 paying fans (while there were 20,000 fans outside) came to Wrigley Field to see Jackie Robinson of the Brooklyn Dodgers play. The Dodgers won by a score of 4–2.

=== Season standings ===
National League
Team	W	L	Pct.	GB	Home	Road
Brooklyn Dodgers	94	60	.610	—	52‍–‍25	42‍–‍35
St. Louis Cardinals	89	65	.578	5	46‍–‍31	43‍–‍34
Boston Braves	86	68	.558	8	50‍–‍27	36‍–‍41
New York Giants	81	73	.526	13	45‍–‍31	36‍–‍42
Cincinnati Reds	73	81	.474	21	42‍–‍35	31‍–‍46
Chicago Cubs	69	85	.448	25	36‍–‍43	33‍–‍42
Philadelphia Phillies	62	92	.403	32	38‍–‍38	24‍–‍54
Pittsburgh Pirates	62	92	.403	32	32‍–‍45	30‍–‍47

=== Record vs. opponents ===
1947 National League record Sources:
Team	BSN	BRO	CHC	CIN	NYG	PHI	PIT	STL
Boston	—	12–10	13–9	13–9	13–9	14–8	12–10	9–13
Brooklyn	10–12	—	15–7	15–7	14–8	14–8	15–7	11–11–1
Chicago	9–13	7–15	—	12–10	7–15	16–6–1	8–14	10–12
Cincinnati	9–13	7–15	10–12	—	13–9	13–9	13–9	8–14
New York	9–13	8–14	15–7	9–13	—	12–10	15–7–1	13–9
Philadelphia	8–14	8–14	6–16–1	9–13	10–12	—	13–9	8–14
Pittsburgh	10–12	7–15	14–8	9–13	7–15–1	9–13	—	6–16–1
St. Louis	13–9	11–11–1	12–10	14–8	9–13	14–8	16–6–1	—

=== Roster ===
1947 Chicago Cubs
Roster
Pitchers: 26 Hank Borowy; 32 Bob Carpenter; 31 Bob Chipman; 37 Paul Erickson; 35 Ralph Hamner; 29 Emil Kush; 22,23 Doyle Lade; 23 Bill Lee; 17 Russ Meers; 28 Russ Meyer; 24 Ox Miller; 13 Claude Passeau; 34 Freddy Schmidt; 53 Johnny Schmitz; 33 Hank Wyse	Catchers: 11 Mickey Livingston; 8 Clyde McCullough; 10 Bob Scheffing; 12 Dewey Williams; Infielders: 22 Lonny Frey; 6 Stan Hack; 20 Don Johnson; 45 Billy Jurges; 47 Peanuts Lowrey; 49 Ray Mack; 21 Sal Madrid; 21 Lennie Merullo; 5 Hank Schenz; 7 Bobby Sturgeon; 36 Eddie Waitkus	Outfielders: 11 Cliff Aberson; 44 Phil Cavarretta; 46 Dom Dallessandro; 43 Bill Nicholson; 48 Andy Pafko; 35 Marv Rickert	Manager: 40 Charlie Grimm; Coaches: 42 Roy Johnson; 45 Billy Jurges; 52 Red Smith; 41 Milt Stock

== Player stats ==
=== Batting ===
==== Starters by position ====
Note: Pos = Position; G = Games played; AB = At bats; H = Hits; Avg. = Batting average; HR = Home runs; RBI = Runs batted in

Pos	Player	G	AB	H	Avg.	HR	RBI
C	Bob Scheffing	110	363	96	.264	5	50
1B	Eddie Waitkus	130	514	150	.292	2	35
2B	Don Johnson	120	402	104	.259	3	26
SS	Lennie Merullo	108	373	90	.241	0	29
3B	Peanuts Lowrey	115	448	126	.281	5	37
OF	Andy Pafko	129	513	155	.302	13	66
OF	Bill Nicholson	148	487	119	.244	26	75
OF	Phil Cavarretta	127	459	144	.314	2	63

==== Other batters ====
Note: G = Games played; AB = At bats; H = Hits; Avg. = Batting average; HR = Home runs; RBI = Runs batted in

Player	G	AB	H	Avg.	HR	RBI
Stan Hack	76	240	65	.271	0	12
Clyde McCullough	86	234	59	.252	3	30
Bobby Sturgeon	87	232	59	.254	0	21
Cliff Aberson	47	140	39	.279	4	20
Marv Rickert	71	137	20	.146	2	15
Dom Dallessandro	66	115	33	.287	1	14
Ray Mack	21	78	17	.218	2	12
Lonny Frey	24	43	9	.209	0	3
Billy Jurges	14	40	8	.200	1	2
Mickey Livingston	19	33	7	.212	0	3
Sal Madrid	8	24	3	.125	0	1
Hank Schenz	7	14	1	.071	0	0
Dewey Williams	3	2	0	.000	0	0

=== Pitching ===
==== Starting pitchers ====
Note: G = Games pitched; IP = Innings pitched; W = Wins; L = Losses; ERA = Earned run average; SO = Strikeouts

Player	G	IP	W	L	ERA	SO
Johnny Schmitz	38	207.0	13	18	3.22	97
Doyle Lade	34	187.1	11	10	3.94	62
Ralph Hamner	3	25.0	1	2	2.82	14
Ox Miller	4	16.0	1	2	10.13	7
Freddy Schmidt	1	3.0	0	0	9.00	0

==== Other pitchers ====
Note: G = Games pitched; IP = Innings pitched; W = Wins; L = Losses; ERA = Earned run average; SO = Strikeouts

Player	G	IP	W	L	ERA	SO
Hank Borowy	40	183.0	8	12	4.38	75
Paul Erickson	40	174.0	7	12	4.34	82
Hank Wyse	37	142.0	6	9	4.31	53
Bob Chipman	32	134.2	7	6	3.68	51
Claude Passeau	19	63.1	2	6	6.25	26
Bob Carpenter	4	7.1	0	1	4.91	1

==== Relief pitchers ====
Note: G = Games pitched; W = Wins; L = Losses; SV = Saves; ERA = Earned run average; SO = Strikeouts

Player	G	W	L	SV	ERA	SO
Emil Kush	47	8	3	5	3.36	44
Russ Meers	35	2	0	0	4.48	28
Russ Meyer	23	3	2	0	3.40	22
Bill Lee	14	0	2	0	4.50	9

== Farm system ==
Level	Team	League	Manager
AAA	Los Angeles Angels	Pacific Coast League	Bill Kelly
AA	Nashville Vols	Southern Association	Larry Gilbert
AA	Tulsa Oilers	Texas League	Gus Mancuso
A	Macon Peaches	Sally League	Ray Hayworth
A	Des Moines Bruins	Western League	Jim Keesey
B	Davenport Cubs	Illinois–Indiana–Iowa League	Dickey Kerr and Morrie Arnovich
B	Portsmouth Cubs	Piedmont League	Gene Hasson
B	Fayetteville Cubs	Tri-State League	Clyde McDowell
B	Tacoma Tigers	Western International League	Luther Harvel
C	Visalia Cubs	California League	John Intlekofer
C	Clinton Cubs	Central Association	Bob Peterson
C	Sioux Falls Canaries	Northern League	Jim Oglesby
C	Hutchinson Cubs	Western Association	Morrie Arnovich and Dickey Kerr
D	Elizabethton Betsy Cubs	Appalachian League	Lou Bekeza
D	Centralia Cubs	Illinois State League	Chuck Hawley
D	Iola Cubs	Kansas–Oklahoma–Missouri League	Al Reitz
D	Lumberton Cubs	Tobacco State League	Red Lucas
D	Janesville Bears	Wisconsin State League	Frankie Piet

LEAGUE CHAMPIONS: Los Angeles, Clinton, Sioux Falls
