= Dixie Howell (catcher) =

American baseball player (1920–1990)

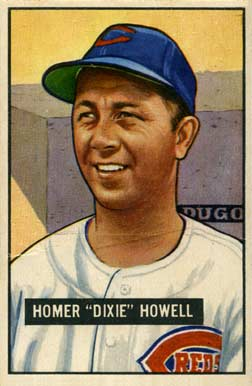
- Catcher
- Born: April 24, 1920; Louisville, Kentucky, U.S.
- Died: October 5, 1990 (aged 70); Binghamton, New York, U.S.
- Batted: Right Threw: Right

MLB debut
- May 6, 1947, for the Pittsburgh Pirates

Last MLB appearance
- September 8, 1956, for the Brooklyn Dodgers

MLB statistics
- Batting average: .246
- Home runs: 12
- Runs batted in: 93
- Stats at Baseball Reference

Teams
- Pittsburgh Pirates (1947); Cincinnati Reds (1949–1952); Brooklyn Dodgers (1953, 1955–1956)

Career highlights and awards
- World Series champion (1955)

Homer Elliot "Dixie" Howell (April 24, 1920 – October 5, 1990) was an American professional baseball catcher. He appeared in eight seasons in Major League Baseball (MLB) between 1947 and 1956 for the Pittsburgh Pirates, Cincinnati Reds and Brooklyn Dodgers.

== Robinson's teammate in Montreal ==
Howell was born in Louisville, Kentucky. He threw and batted right-handed, stood 5 feet 11 inches (1.80 m) tall and weighed 190 pounds (86 kg). His professional career began in 1938 after his graduation from Louisville Male High School. By 1941, he had been acquired by the Dodgers and was playing for their top affiliate, the Montreal Royals of the International League. With the outbreak of World War II, he served in the United States Army in the European Theater of Operations and missed the 1944–45 seasons. In 1946 he returned to Montreal and split catching duties for the Royals with left-handed-batting Herman Franks. The 1946 Royals, led by second baseman Jackie Robinson, won the league championship and the Junior World Series, but are famous as the first racially integrated team in "organized baseball" since the 1880s. Howell witnessed Robinson's constant battle against intimidation—especially in the form of brushback pitches.

"I was with Jackie on Montreal", Howell told Roger Kahn in 1953. "The way he was thrown at that year was unbelievable. Unbelievable and disgraceful."

"You never saw anything like it", Howell said in a Los Angeles Times interview published eight months before his 1990 death. "Every time he came up, he'd go down!"

According to Robinson biographer Arnold Rampersad, Howell was one of two Southern-born Montreal players (with Marv Rackley) who personally wished Robinson well on his promotion to the parent Dodgers in April 1947, breaking the baseball color line.

== Major league career ==
Howell also made his major league debut in 1947, but not for the Dodgers. On May 3, he was traded to the Pirates in a multi-player transaction headlined by former Brooklyn starting pitcher Kirby Higbe, and played his first game three days later, going hitless in three at bats against the Boston Braves' ace right-hander, Johnny Sain. Howell and Clyde Kluttz served as the Bucs' two primary catchers in 1947 and Howell batted an MLB-career-high .276, but at the end of the season he was traded to the Triple-A San Francisco Seals, and spent 1948 in the Pacific Coast League.

Selected by Cincinnati in the 1948 Rule 5 draft, Howell spent the next four seasons (1949–52) in the big leagues with the Reds, serving as their most-used catcher in both 1950 and 1951. But in 1952, the Reds traded for veteran receiver Andy Seminick and Howell appeared in only 17 games. In October, the Dodgers reacquired him for pitcher Clyde King. He played mostly at Triple-A in 1953 and 1954 (when he returned to the Montreal Royals), but spent the entire 1955 season on Brooklyn's National League roster. Playing behind Roy Campanella and Rube Walker, Howell got into only 16 games (13 in the field and nine as a starting catcher). But he batted .262, and participated in another memorable season that saw Brooklyn win its only world championship, a seven-game triumph over the New York Yankees in the 1955 World Series. Howell did not appear in the World Series.

Howell was sent back to the Royals for most of the 1956 campaign, but was recalled by the pennant-bound Dodgers in August for his final seven games of major league service. He collected three hits and started in four games, but did not participate in the 1956 World Series, a rematch between the Dodgers and Yankees won by the Bombers in seven games. Howell's career then continued in the minor leagues in 1957–58 before his retirement. As a big leaguer, in 340 games over eight seasons he collected 224 hits in 910 at-bats, scoring 98 runs, with 39 doubles, four triples, 12 home runs and 93 RBI. Defensively, he recorded a .984 fielding percentage as a catcher.

He is one of three Dixie Howells to have played professional baseball, and his big-league career coincided with that of pitcher Millard "Dixie" Howell, also a native Kentuckian. Both Dixie Howells were teammates on the 1949 Cincinnati Reds.
