= Chuck Diering =

American baseball player (1923–2012)

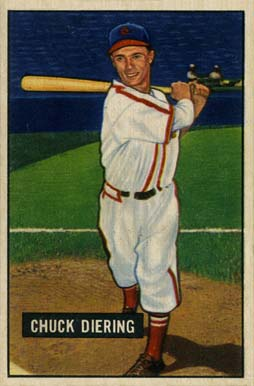
- Outfielder
- Born: February 5, 1923; St. Louis, Missouri, U.S.
- Died: November 23, 2012 (aged 89); Spanish Lake, Missouri, U.S.
- Batted: Right Threw: Right

MLB debut
- April 15, 1947, for the St. Louis Cardinals

Last MLB appearance
- June 24, 1956, for the Baltimore Orioles

MLB statistics
- Batting average: .249
- Home runs: 14
- Runs batted in: 141
- Stats at Baseball Reference

Teams
- St. Louis Cardinals (1947–1951); New York Giants (1952); Baltimore Orioles (1954–1956)

Charles Edward Allen Diering (February 5, 1923 – November 23, 2012) was an American professional baseball player who appeared in 752 games in Major League Baseball as outfielder and third baseman over all or part of nine seasons between 1947 and 1956 for the St. Louis Cardinals, New York Giants and Baltimore Orioles. He batted and threw right-handed and was listed as 5 feet 10 inches (1.78 m) tall and 165 pounds (75 kg).

Born in St. Louis, Diering attended Beaumont High School and began his pro career in the Cardinals' organization in 1941, then missed the 1943–1945 seasons performing World War II service in the United States Army.

Diering returned to baseball in 1946, and made the Cardinals' roster at the outset of the 1947 season. But he didn't win a regular job until 1949, when he was the Redbirds' starting center fielder, batting a career-high .263 in 131 games played. He only held that job for 1949 and part of 1950, then reverted to a backup role. He was traded to the Giants with Max Lanier for Eddie Stanky on December 11, 1951. He hit only .174 in sparse duty for the 1952 Giants, and spent much of that campaign and all of 1953 with Triple-A Minneapolis.

Selected by the transplanted former St. Louis Browns in the 1953 Rule 5 draft, Diering resumed a regular role for the brand-new Baltimore Orioles in 1954 and 1955, getting into 265 total games. He was selected the club's first-ever Most Valuable Player in 1954. By the middle of 1956, however, his offensive struggles cost him his regular and MLB status. After playing his final game as an Oriole on June 24, 1956, as a defensive replacement against the Detroit Tigers at Briggs Stadium, he continued his pro career in the minor leagues into 1957.

In his 752-game, nine-season major league tenure, Diering collected 411 hits, with 76 doubles, 14 triples and 14 home runs. He batted .249 lifetime with 141 runs batted in.

After his playing days were over, Diering owned a car dealership in Alton, Illinois. He died in Spanish Lake, Missouri, at 89 on November 23, 2012.
