= Hank Camelli =

American baseball player (1914–1996)

- Catcher
- Born: December 9, 1914; Gloucester, Massachusetts, U.S.
- Died: July 14, 1996 (aged 81); Wellesley, Massachusetts, U.S.
- Batted: Right Threw: Right

MLB debut
- October 3, 1943, for the Pittsburgh Pirates

Last MLB appearance
- September 28, 1947, for the Boston Braves

MLB statistics
- Batting average: .229
- Home runs: 2
- Runs batted in: 26
- Stats at Baseball Reference

Teams
- Pittsburgh Pirates (1943–1946); Boston Braves (1947)

Henry Richard Camelli (December 9, 1914 – July 14, 1996) was an American professional baseball player. A catcher, he appeared in Major League Baseball between 1943 and 1947 for the Pittsburgh Pirates and Boston Braves. The native of Gloucester, Massachusetts, stood 5 feet 11 inches (1.80 m) tall, weighed 190 pounds (86 kg) and threw and batted right-handed.

Camelli’s professional baseball career stretched over 16 seasons (1935–48; 1950–51), with 13 years in minor league baseball as a player and playing manager, including 1940 when at age 25 he was the catcher/manager of the Saginaw Athletics of the Class C Michigan State League. During one stretch that season, Camelli caught six doubleheaders in a row. He appeared in single games for the 1943 and 1945 Pirates, the latter because of military service in the United States Army. His best MLB season was 1944, when he batted .296 with 37 hits and one home run in 63 games and 125 at bats. Overall, he appeared in 159 games in all or parts of five Major League campaigns.

On September 30, 1946, he was included in a multiplayer trade that sent him to his hometown Braves with third baseman Bob Elliott for future Hall of Fame second baseman Billy Herman, pitcher Elmer Singleton, outfielder Stan Wentzel and infielder Whitey Wietelmann. Herman was promptly named playing manager of the 1947 Pirates, but he was aghast at the cost — Elliott — the Pirates had paid for him. "Why, they've gone and traded the whole team on me", he said. Elliott would win the 1947 National League Most Valuable Player award and lead Boston to the 1948 National League pennant. Herman's 1947 Pirates lost 92 games and finished tied for seventh in the NL, and he resigned before the season's final game.

Camelli was Boston's second-string catcher (behind Phil Masi) in 1947, his final season in the Majors. The Braves then sent him to the San Diego Padres of the AAA Pacific Coast League for 1948. He died in Wellesley, Massachusetts, at the age of 81.
