= 1947 St. Louis Cardinals season =

Major League Baseball season

1947 St. Louis Cardinals
- League: National League
- Ballpark: Sportsman's Park
- City: St. Louis, Missouri
- Record: 89–65 (.578)
- League place: 2nd
- Owners: Sam Breadon
- General managers: William Walsingham Jr.
- Managers: Eddie Dyer
- Television: KSD (Harry Caray, Gabby Street)
- Radio: WTMV/WEW (Harry Caray, Gabby Street)
- Stats: ESPN.com; Baseball Reference

The 1947 St. Louis Cardinals season was the team's 66th season in St. Louis, Missouri and the 56th season in the National League. The Cardinals went 89–65 during the season and finished second in the National League.

== Offseason ==
- November 17, 1946: Tom Poholsky was drafted by the Cardinals from the Boston Red Sox in the 1946 minor league draft.
- December 13, 1946: Hal Epps was selected off waivers by the Cardinals from the Philadelphia Athletics.
- Prior to 1947 season: Rip Repulski was signed as an amateur free agent by the Cardinals.

== Regular season ==
- May 6: There were rumors of a walkout by the Cardinals in protest of having to play Jackie Robinson and the Brooklyn Dodgers. The rumors resulted in an article published by Stanley Woodward of the New York Herald Tribune. The Cardinals played the game and lost by a score of 7–6, despite holding a 6–3 lead.
- May 21: Jackie Robinson played his first game at Sportsman's Park. The Dodgers won by a score of 4–3 in ten innings.
- September 11: Cardinals catcher Joe Garagiola and Jackie Robinson were involved in an incident at home plate. Garagiola stepped on Robinson's foot and the two started arguing. Umpire Bean Reardon held back Garagiola while Robinson clapped. The incident was later part of a children's book titled In the Year of the Boar and Jackie Robinson.

=== Season standings ===
National League
| Team | W | L | Pct. | GB | Home | Road |
|---|---|---|---|---|---|---|
| Brooklyn Dodgers | 94 | 60 | .610 | — | 52‍–‍25 | 42‍–‍35 |
| St. Louis Cardinals | 89 | 65 | .578 | 5 | 46‍–‍31 | 43‍–‍34 |
| Boston Braves | 86 | 68 | .558 | 8 | 50‍–‍27 | 36‍–‍41 |
| New York Giants | 81 | 73 | .526 | 13 | 45‍–‍31 | 36‍–‍42 |
| Cincinnati Reds | 73 | 81 | .474 | 21 | 42‍–‍35 | 31‍–‍46 |
| Chicago Cubs | 69 | 85 | .448 | 25 | 36‍–‍43 | 33‍–‍42 |
| Philadelphia Phillies | 62 | 92 | .403 | 32 | 38‍–‍38 | 24‍–‍54 |
| Pittsburgh Pirates | 62 | 92 | .403 | 32 | 32‍–‍45 | 30‍–‍47 |

=== Record vs. opponents ===
1947 National League record Sources:
| Team | BSN | BRO | CHC | CIN | NYG | PHI | PIT | STL |
|---|---|---|---|---|---|---|---|---|
| Boston | — | 12–10 | 13–9 | 13–9 | 13–9 | 14–8 | 12–10 | 9–13 |
| Brooklyn | 10–12 | — | 15–7 | 15–7 | 14–8 | 14–8 | 15–7 | 11–11–1 |
| Chicago | 9–13 | 7–15 | — | 12–10 | 7–15 | 16–6–1 | 8–14 | 10–12 |
| Cincinnati | 9–13 | 7–15 | 10–12 | — | 13–9 | 13–9 | 13–9 | 8–14 |
| New York | 9–13 | 8–14 | 15–7 | 9–13 | — | 12–10 | 15–7–1 | 13–9 |
| Philadelphia | 8–14 | 8–14 | 6–16–1 | 9–13 | 10–12 | — | 13–9 | 8–14 |
| Pittsburgh | 10–12 | 7–15 | 14–8 | 9–13 | 7–15–1 | 9–13 | — | 6–16–1 |
| St. Louis | 13–9 | 11–11–1 | 12–10 | 14–8 | 9–13 | 14–8 | 16–6–1 | — |

=== Notable transactions ===
- May 3, 1947: Harry Walker and Freddy Schmidt were traded by the Cardinals to the Philadelphia Phillies for Ron Northey.

=== Roster ===
1947 St. Louis Cardinals
Roster
| Pitchers: 27 Al Brazle; 31 Harry Brecheen; 10 Ken Burkhart; 22 Murry Dickson; 33 Johnny Grodzicki; 34 Jim Hearn; 35 Ken Johnson; 20 Red Munger; 11 Howie Pollet; 29 Freddy Schmidt; 14 Jerry Staley; 28 Ted Wilks | Catchers: 17 Joe Garagiola; 18 Del Rice; 23 Del Wilber; Infielders: 16 Bernie Creger; 3 Jeff Cross; 7,19 Nippy Jones; 1 Whitey Kurowski; 4 Marty Marion; 6 Stan Musial; 2 Red Schoendienst; 15 Dick Sisler | Outfielders: 32 Chuck Diering; 7,19 Erv Dusak; 21 Joe Medwick; 8 Terry Moore; 5 Ron Northey; 9 Enos Slaughter; 5 Harry Walker | Manager: 30 Eddie Dyer; Coaches: 25 Tony Kaufmann; 26 Buzzy Wares |

== Player stats ==
=== Batting ===
==== Starters by position ====
Note: Pos = Position; G = Games played; AB = At bats; H = Hits; Avg. = Batting average; HR = Home runs; RBI = Runs batted in

| Pos | Player | G | AB | H | Avg. | HR | RBI |
|---|---|---|---|---|---|---|---|
| C | Del Rice | 97 | 261 | 57 | .218 | 12 | 44 |
| 1B | Stan Musial | 149 | 587 | 183 | .312 | 19 | 95 |
| 2B | Red Schoendienst | 151 | 659 | 167 | .253 | 3 | 48 |
| 3B | Whitey Kurowski | 146 | 513 | 159 | .310 | 27 | 104 |
| SS | Marty Marion | 149 | 540 | 147 | .272 | 4 | 74 |
| OF | Erv Dusak | 111 | 328 | 93 | .284 | 6 | 28 |
| OF | Enos Slaughter | 147 | 551 | 162 | .294 | 10 | 86 |
| OF | Terry Moore | 127 | 460 | 130 | .283 | 7 | 45 |

==== Other batters ====
Note: G = Games played; AB = At bats; H = Hits; Avg. = Batting average; HR = Home runs; RBI = Runs batted in

| Player | G | AB | H | Avg. | HR | RBI |
|---|---|---|---|---|---|---|
| Ron Northey | 110 | 311 | 91 | .293 | 15 | 63 |
| Joe Garagiola | 77 | 183 | 47 | .257 | 5 | 25 |
| Joe Medwick | 75 | 150 | 46 | .307 | 4 | 28 |
| Del Wilber | 51 | 99 | 23 | .232 | 0 | 12 |
| Chuck Diering | 105 | 74 | 16 | .216 | 2 | 11 |
| Dick Sisler | 46 | 74 | 15 | .203 | 0 | 9 |
| Nippy Jones | 23 | 73 | 18 | .247 | 1 | 5 |
| Jeff Cross | 51 | 49 | 5 | .102 | 0 | 3 |
| Harry Walker | 10 | 25 | 5 | .200 | 0 | 0 |
| Bernie Creger | 15 | 16 | 3 | .188 | 0 | 0 |

=== Pitching ===
==== Starting pitchers ====
Note: G = Games pitched; IP = Innings pitched; W = Wins; L = Losses; ERA = Earned run average; SO = Strikeouts

| Player | G | IP | W | L | ERA | SO |
|---|---|---|---|---|---|---|
| Red Munger | 40 | 224.1 | 16 | 5 | 3.37 | 123 |
| Harry Brecheen | 29 | 223.1 | 16 | 11 | 3.30 | 89 |

==== Other pitchers ====
Note: G = Games pitched; IP = Innings pitched; W = Wins; L = Losses; ERA = Earned run average; SO = Strikeouts

| Player | G | IP | W | L | ERA | SO |
|---|---|---|---|---|---|---|
| Murry Dickson | 47 | 231.2 | 13 | 16 | 3.07 | 111 |
| Howie Pollet | 37 | 176.1 | 9 | 11 | 4.34 | 73 |
| Al Brazle | 44 | 168.0 | 14 | 8 | 2.84 | 85 |
| Jim Hearn | 37 | 162.0 | 12 | 7 | 3.22 | 57 |
| Ken Burkhart | 34 | 95.0 | 3 | 6 | 5.21 | 44 |
| Ken Johnson | 2 | 10.0 | 1 | 0 | 0.00 | 8 |

==== Relief pitchers ====
Note: G = Games pitched; W = Wins; L = Losses; SV = Saves; ERA = Earned run average; SO = Strikeouts

| Player | G | W | L | SV | ERA | SO |
|---|---|---|---|---|---|---|
| Ted Wilks | 37 | 4 | 0 | 5 | 5.01 | 28 |
| Gerry Staley | 18 | 1 | 0 | 0 | 2.76 | 14 |
| Johnny Grodzicki | 16 | 0 | 1 | 0 | 5.40 | 8 |
| Freddy Schmidt | 2 | 0 | 0 | 0 | 2.25 | 2 |

== Farm system ==
| Level | Team | League | Manager |
|---|---|---|---|
| AAA | Columbus Red Birds | American Association | Hal Anderson |
| AAA | Rochester Red Wings | International League | Cedric Durst |
| AA | Houston Buffaloes | Texas League | Johnny Keane |
| A | Columbus Cardinals | Sally League | Kemp Wicker |
| A | Omaha Cardinals | Western League | Ollie Vanek |
| B | Decatur Commodores | Illinois–Indiana–Iowa League | Gene Corbett |
| B | Allentown Cardinals | Interstate League | Specs Garbee and Benny Borgmann |
| B | Lynchburg Cardinals | Piedmont League | Jack McLain and Vernon Mackie |
| C | Fresno Cardinals | California League | Frank Demaree, Bill Harris, Charlie Baron and Bill Brenzel |
| C | Winston-Salem Cardinals | Carolina League | Zip Payne |
| C | Duluth Dukes | Northern League | Paul Bowa |
| C | Pocatello Cardinals | Pioneer League | Jim Tyack |
| C | St. Joseph Cardinals | Western Association | Bob Stanton |
| D | Johnson City Cardinals | Appalachian League | Bob Kline |
| D | Salisbury Cardinals | Eastern Shore League | Harold Contini |
| D | Albany Cardinals | Georgia–Florida League | Mickey Katkaveck |
| D | West Frankfort Cardinals | Illinois State League | Everett Johnston |
| D | Carthage Cardinals | Kansas–Oklahoma–Missouri League | Woody Fair |
| D | Hamilton Cardinals | PONY League | John Newman |

LEAGUE CHAMPIONS: Houston, St. Joseph
