= Johnny McKee =

American baseball player and coach

John R. McKee (December 6, 1914 – May 12, 2013) was an American college baseball player and Major League Baseball coach. He spent one season, 1947, as the bullpen coach of the Pittsburgh Pirates.

McKee was born in Philadelphia, Pennsylvania. According to the Society for American Baseball Research, he was a catcher for nearby Villanova University. No professional playing record is listed for him in Baseball Reference. During World War II, he was a pilot and lieutenant colonel in the United States Army Air Forces.

McKee served on the coaching staff of Pittsburgh manager Billy Herman in 1947. According to the Pittsburgh Post-Gazette and the United Press, McKee and fellow coach Zack Taylor were released on October 23, 1947, after Billy Meyer succeeded Herman as the Pirates' skipper; those accounts referred to McKee as the club's "bullpen catcher."

McKee died in Vineland, New Jersey, at the age of 98.
