= Billy Herman =

American baseball player and manager (1909–1992)

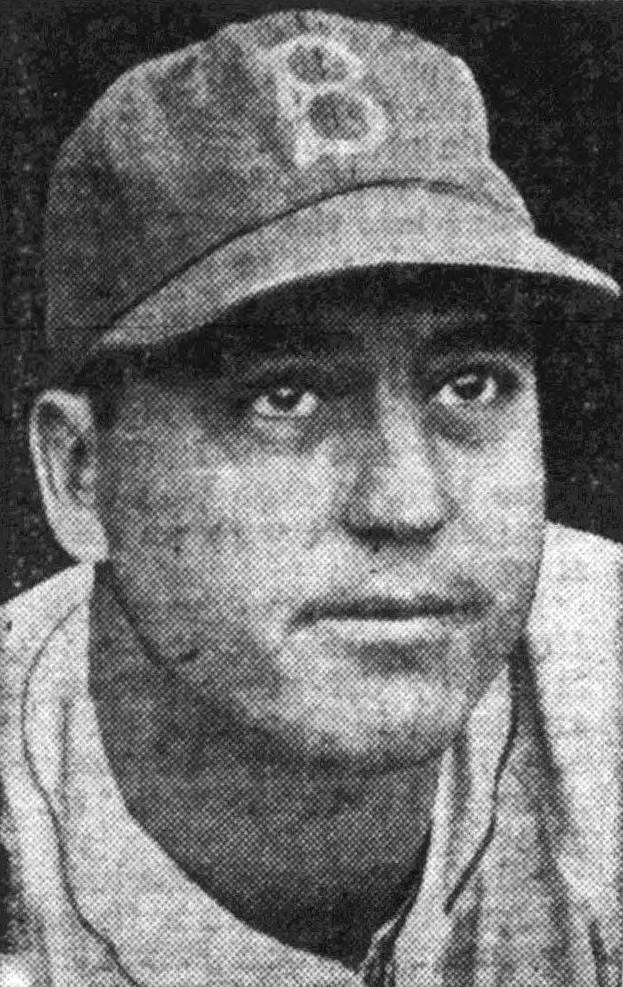
- Herman with the Brooklyn Dodgers in 1941
- Second baseman / Manager
- Born: July 7, 1909; New Albany, Indiana, U.S.
- Died: September 5, 1992 (aged 83); West Palm Beach, Florida, U.S.
- Batted: Right Threw: Right

MLB debut
- August 29, 1931, for the Chicago Cubs

Last MLB appearance
- August 1, 1947, for the Pittsburgh Pirates

MLB statistics
- Batting average: .304
- Hits: 2,345
- Home runs: 47
- Runs batted in: 839
- Managerial record: 189–274
- Winning %: .408
- Stats at Baseball Reference
- Managerial record at Baseball Reference

Teams
- As player: Chicago Cubs (1931–1941); Brooklyn Dodgers (1941–1943, 1946); Boston Braves (1946); Pittsburgh Pirates (1947); As manager: Pittsburgh Pirates (1947); Boston Red Sox (1964–1966); As coach: Brooklyn Dodgers (1952–1957); Milwaukee Braves (1958–1959); Boston Red Sox (1960–1964); California Angels (1967); San Diego Padres (1978–1979)

Career highlights and awards
- 10× All-Star (1934–1943); World Series champion (1955); Chicago Cubs Hall of Fame

Member of the National

Baseball Hall of Fame
- Induction: 1975
- Election method: Veterans Committee

William Jennings Bryan Herman (July 7, 1909 – September 5, 1992) was an American second baseman and manager in Major League Baseball (MLB) during the 1930s and 1940s. He reached the World Series four times (1932, 1935, 1938, 1941) but lost each time. Known for his stellar defense and consistent batting, Herman still holds many National League (NL) defensive records for second basemen and was inducted into the National Baseball Hall of Fame in 1975.

== Biography ==
=== Early life ===
Born in New Albany, Indiana, in 1909, and named after William Jennings Bryan, the three-time presidential candidate and statesman of the turn of the 20th century, Herman attended New Albany High School.

=== Baseball career ===
Herman broke into the majors in 1931 with the Chicago Cubs and asserted himself as a star the following season, 1932, by hitting .314 and scoring 102 runs. His first at-bat was memorable. Facing Cincinnati Reds pitcher Si Johnson, Herman chopped a pitch into the back of home plate, which then bounced up and hit Herman in the back of the head, knocking him out. A fixture in the Chicago lineup over the next decade, Herman was a consistent hitter and solid producer. He regularly hit .300 or higher (and as high as .341 in 1935) and drove in a high of 93 runs in 1936. He also hit 57 doubles in both 1935 and 1936.

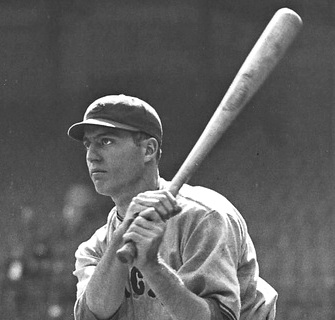
Herman with the Chicago Cubs in 1932

After a sub-standard offensive year in 1940, Herman was traded to the Brooklyn Dodgers in 1941. He had one of his finest offensive season in 1943, when he batted .330 with a .398 on-base percentage and 100 runs driven in.

Herman missed the 1944 and 1945 seasons to serve in World War II, but returned to play in 1946 with the Dodgers and Boston Braves (after being traded mid-season). At 37, he was considered prime managerial material by the new owners of the Pittsburgh Pirates. On September 30, 1946, Herman was traded to Pittsburgh with three marginal players (outfielder Stan Wentzel, pitcher Elmer Singleton and infielder Whitey Wietelmann) for third baseman Bob Elliott and catcher Hank Camelli. Herman was promptly named playing manager of the 1947 Pirates, but he was aghast at the cost—Elliott—the Pirates had paid for him. "Why, they've gone and traded the whole team on me", he said. Elliott won the 1947 NL Most Valuable Player award and led Boston to the 1948 National League pennant. Herman's 1947 Pirates lost 92 games and finished tied for seventh in the NL, and he resigned before the season's final game. (His last appearance as a Major League player was on August 1 of that year.)

Herman then managed in the minor leagues and became a Major League coach with the Dodgers (1952–57) and Braves (now based in Milwaukee) (1958–59)—serving on five National League pennant winners in eight seasons. Then he moved to the American League (AL) as the third-base coach of the Boston Red Sox for five years (1960–64), before managing the Red Sox to lackluster records in 1965 and 1966; his 1965 Boston club lost 100 games. After his firing by the Red Sox in September 1966, he coached for the California Angels (1967) and San Diego Padres (1978–79) and served in player development roles with the Padres and Oakland Athletics.

Herman finished his 1,922-game big-league career with a .304 batting average, 1,163 runs scored, 2,345 hits, 486 doubles, 82 triples, 47 home runs, 839 runs batted in, 737 bases on balls and 428 strikeouts. Defensively, he recorded an overall .968 fielding percentage. He won four NL pennants (1932, 1935, 1938, and 1941) but no World Series championships as a player (although he was a coach on the 1955 World Series champion Brooklyn Dodgers). His record as a Major League manager was 189-274 (.408). Herman holds the NL records for most putouts in a season by a second baseman and led the league in putouts seven times. He also shares the Major League record for most hits on opening day, with five, set April 14, 1936.

=== Later life ===
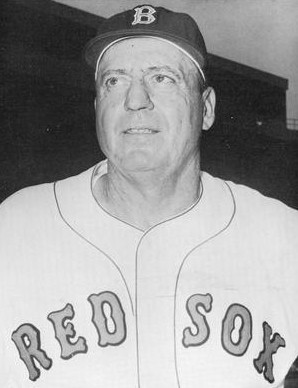
Herman as manager of the Boston Red Sox in 1965

Herman moved to Palm Beach Gardens, Florida in 1968. He was inducted into the Baseball Hall of Fame in 1975. He died of cancer in 1992.

In 2013, the Bob Feller Act of Valor Award honored Herman as one of 37 Baseball Hall of Fame members for his service in the United States Navy during World War II. According to his honorable discharge, he was awarded the American Campaign Medal, the Asiatic Pacific Campaign Medal, and the WWII Victory Medal. He held the rank of Specialist (A) Third Class at the time of his separation.

=== Personal ===
Herman's granddaughter is Cheri Herman Daniels, wife of former Indiana Governor Mitch Daniels.

== Managerial record ==
Team	Year	Regular season					Postseason			
Team	Year	Games	Won	Lost	Win %	Finish	Won	Lost	Win %	Result
PIT	1947	153	61	92	.399	resigned	–	–	–	–
PIT total		153	61	92	.399		0	0	–	
BOS	1964	2	2	0	1.000	8th in AL	–	–	–	–
BOS	1965	162	62	100	.383	9th in AL	–	–	–	–
BOS	1966	146	64	82	.438	fired	–	–	–	–
BOS total		310	128	182	.413		0	0	–	
Total		463	189	274	.408		0	0	–	

== See also ==
- List of Major League Baseball career hits leaders
- List of Major League Baseball doubles records
- List of Major League Baseball career doubles leaders
- List of Major League Baseball career runs scored leaders
- List of Major League Baseball annual doubles leaders
- List of Major League Baseball annual triples leaders
- List of Major League Baseball player-managers

Sporting positions
Preceded by Connie Ryan	Milwaukee Braves third-base coach 1958–1959	Succeeded by George Myatt
Preceded by Jack Burns	Boston Red Sox third-base coach 1960–1964	Succeeded by Billy Gardner
Preceded by Salty Parker	California Angels third-base coach 1967	Succeeded by Rocky Bridges
