= Lou Tost =

American baseball player (1911–1967)

- Pitcher
- Born: June 1, 1911; Cumberland, Washington, US
- Died: February 21, 1967 (aged 55); Santa Clara, California, US
- Batted: Left Threw: Left

MLB debut
- April 20, 1942, for the Boston Braves

Last MLB appearance
- April 24, 1947, for the Pittsburgh Pirates

MLB statistics
- Win–loss record: 10–11
- Earned run average: 3.65
- Strikeouts: 46
- Stats at Baseball Reference

Teams
- Boston Braves (1942–1943); Pittsburgh Pirates (1947)

Louis Eugene Tost (June 1, 1911 – February 21, 1967) was an American Major League Baseball pitcher. He played three seasons with the Boston Braves (1942–43) and Pittsburgh Pirates (1947).

From 1944 to 1945, Tost served in the United States Navy during World War II.
