= 1947 Philadelphia Phillies season =

Major League Baseball season

1947 Philadelphia Phillies
- Also known as the Philadelphia Blue Jays
- League: National League
- Ballpark: Shibe Park
- City: Philadelphia
- Owners: R. R. M. Carpenter
- General managers: Herb Pennock
- Managers: Ben Chapman
- Television: WPTZ
- Radio: WIBG (By Saam, Chuck Thompson)

The 1947 Philadelphia Phillies season was the 65th season in the history of the franchise.

The Phillies finished in 7th place in the National League with a record of 62 wins and 92 losses. It was the first season for Phillies television broadcasts, which debuted on WPTZ.

== Offseason ==
- Prior to 1947 season: Carl Sawatski was acquired from the Phillies by the Boston Braves.

On July 27, 1946, the City of Clearwater had announced that the Phillies had accepted Clearwater's invitation to train at Clearwater Athletic Field in 1947 on a one-year agreement. On March 7, 1947, the Phillies and city signed a 10-year deal for the Phillies to train in Clearwater. The Phillies lost their first spring training game in 1947 at Athletic Field to the Detroit Tigers by a score of 13–1. The Phillies' attendance that spring was 13,291 which was ninth out of the ten teams training in Florida.

== Regular season ==
- April 22: During a game against the Brooklyn Dodgers, Phillies manager Ben Chapman hurled racial slurs at Jackie Robinson. Commissioner Happy Chandler warned the franchise to keep the manager under control or face disciplinary action. Of note, it was the first major league game in which Robinson committed an error.
- June 2: The Phillies travel to Egypt, Pennsylvania to recruit Curt Simmons and play a team of all-star high school players from the Lehigh Valley. The game was played on the opening day of Egypt Memorial Park, June 2, 1947, in front of a crowd of 4,500. Simmons struck out eleven and the game ended in a 4–4 tie (a late-game error was the only thing that prevented the high school team from winning).

=== Season standings ===
National League
Team	W	L	Pct.	GB	Home	Road
Brooklyn Dodgers	94	60	.610	—	52‍–‍25	42‍–‍35
St. Louis Cardinals	89	65	.578	5	46‍–‍31	43‍–‍34
Boston Braves	86	68	.558	8	50‍–‍27	36‍–‍41
New York Giants	81	73	.526	13	45‍–‍31	36‍–‍42
Cincinnati Reds	73	81	.474	21	42‍–‍35	31‍–‍46
Chicago Cubs	69	85	.448	25	36‍–‍43	33‍–‍42
Philadelphia Phillies	62	92	.403	32	38‍–‍38	24‍–‍54
Pittsburgh Pirates	62	92	.403	32	32‍–‍45	30‍–‍47

=== Record vs. opponents ===
1947 National League record Sources:
Team	BSN	BRO	CHC	CIN	NYG	PHI	PIT	STL
Boston	—	12–10	13–9	13–9	13–9	14–8	12–10	9–13
Brooklyn	10–12	—	15–7	15–7	14–8	14–8	15–7	11–11–1
Chicago	9–13	7–15	—	12–10	7–15	16–6–1	8–14	10–12
Cincinnati	9–13	7–15	10–12	—	13–9	13–9	13–9	8–14
New York	9–13	8–14	15–7	9–13	—	12–10	15–7–1	13–9
Philadelphia	8–14	8–14	6–16–1	9–13	10–12	—	13–9	8–14
Pittsburgh	10–12	7–15	14–8	9–13	7–15–1	9–13	—	6–16–1
St. Louis	13–9	11–11–1	12–10	14–8	9–13	14–8	16–6–1	—

=== Notable transactions ===
- May 3, 1947: Ron Northey was traded by the Phillies to the St. Louis Cardinals for Harry Walker and Freddy Schmidt.

=== Roster ===
1947 Philadelphia Phillies
Roster
Pitchers: 30 Blix Donnelly; 27 Ken Heintzelman; 36 Lefty Hoerst; 28 Tommy Hughes; 17 Oscar Judd; 21 Al Jurisich; 26 Dick Koecher; 20 Dutch Leonard; 15 Dick Mauney; 29 Lou Possehl; 16 Ken Raffensberger; 19 Schoolboy Rowe; 18 Charley Schanz; 33 Freddy Schmidt; 32 Curt Simmons; 37 Homer Spragins	Catchers: 32 Rollie Hemsley; 8 Don Padgett; 35 Hugh Poland; 24 Andy Seminick; Infielders: 22 Jack Albright; 27 Putsy Caballero; 36 Nick Etten; 35 Granny Hamner; 35 Lee Handley; 12 Willie Jones; 26 Al Lakeman; 22 Ralph LaPointe; 10 Frank McCormick; 6 Skeeter Newsome; 26,10 Howie Schultz; 5 Jim Tabor; 9 Emil Verban	Outfielders: 2 Buster Adams; 14 Del Ennis; 3 Charlie Gilbert; -- Jesse Levan; 12 Ron Northey; 4 Harry Walker; 1 Johnny Wyrostek; Other batters: 12 Lou Finney	Manager: 7 Ben Chapman; Coaches: 11 Benny Bengough; 25 Benny Culp; 31 Cy Perkins

== Player stats ==
=== Batting ===
==== Starters by position ====
Note: Pos = Position; G = Games played; AB = At bats; H = Hits; Avg. = Batting average; HR = Home runs; RBI = Runs batted in

Pos	Player	G	AB	H	Avg.	HR	RBI
C	Andy Seminick	111	337	85	.252	13	50
1B	Howie Schultz	114	403	90	.223	6	35
2B	Emil Verban	155	540	154	.285	0	42
SS	Skeeter Newsome	95	310	71	.229	2	22
3B	Lee Handley	101	277	70	.253	0	42
OF	Harry Walker	130	488	181	.371	1	41
OF	Del Ennis	139	541	149	.275	12	81
OF	Johnny Wyrostek	128	454	124	.273	5	51

==== Other batters ====
Note: G = Games played; AB = At bats; H = Hits; Avg. = Batting average; HR = Home runs; RBI = Runs batted in

Player	G	AB	H	Avg.	HR	RBI
Jim Tabor	75	251	59	.235	4	31
Ralph LaPointe	56	211	65	.308	1	15
Buster Adams	69	182	45	.247	2	15
Al Lakeman	55	182	29	.159	6	19
Don Padgett	75	158	50	.316	0	24
Charlie Gilbert	83	152	36	.237	2	10
Jack Albright	41	99	23	.232	2	5
Willie Jones	18	62	14	.226	0	10
Ron Northey	13	47	12	.255	0	3
Nick Etten	14	41	10	.244	1	8
Frank McCormick	15	40	9	.225	1	8
Jesse Levan	2	9	4	.444	0	1
Hugh Poland	4	8	0	.000	0	0
Putsy Caballero	2	7	1	.143	0	0
Granny Hamner	2	7	2	.286	0	0
Lou Finney	4	4	0	.000	0	0
Rollie Hemsley	2	3	1	.333	0	1

=== Pitching ===
==== Starting pitchers ====
Note: G = Games pitched; IP = Innings pitched; W = Wins; L = Losses; ERA = Earned run average; SO = Strikeouts

Player	G	IP	W	L	ERA	SO
Dutch Leonard	32	235.0	17	12	2.68	103
Schoolboy Rowe	31	195.2	14	10	4.32	74
Ken Heintzelman	24	136.0	7	10	4.04	55
Curt Simmons	1	9.0	1	0	1.00	9

==== Other pitchers ====
Note: G = Games pitched; IP = Innings pitched; W = Wins; L = Losses; ERA = Earned run average; SO = Strikeouts

Player	G	IP	W	L	ERA	SO
Oscar Judd	32	146.2	4	15	4.60	54
Tommy Hughes	29	127.0	4	11	3.47	44
Blix Donnelly	38	120.2	4	6	2.98	31
Al Jurisich	34	118.1	1	7	4.94	48
Ken Raffensberger	10	41.0	2	6	5.49	16
Dick Koecher	3	17.0	0	2	4.76	4
Lefty Hoerst	4	11.1	1	1	7.94	0

==== Relief pitchers ====
Note: G = Games pitched; W = Wins; L = Losses; SV = Saves; ERA = Earned run average; SO = Strikeouts

Player	G	W	L	SV	ERA	SO
Charley Schanz	34	2	4	2	4.16	42
Freddy Schmidt	29	5	8	0	4.70	24
Dick Mauney	9	0	0	1	3.86	6
Homer Spragins	4	0	0	0	6.75	3
Lou Possehl	2	0	0	0	4.15	1

== Farm system ==
Level	Team	League	Manager
A	Utica Blue Sox	Eastern League	Eddie Sawyer
B	Terre Haute Phillies	Illinois–Indiana–Iowa League	Ray Brubaker, Whitey Gluchoski and Jack Sanford
B	Wilmington Blue Rocks	Interstate League	Jack Saltzgaver
C	Schenectady Blue Jays	Canadian–American League	Leon Riley
C	Vandergrift Pioneers	Middle Atlantic League	Floyd "Pat" Patterson
C	Salina Blue Jays	Western Association	Ed Walls
D	Dover Phillies	Eastern Shore League	Dick Carter
D	Americus Phillies	Georgia–Florida League	Jack Sanford and Lew Krausse, Sr.
D	Carbondale Pioneers	North Atlantic League	Patrick Colgan
D	Bradford Blue Wings	PONY League	George Savino
D	Appleton Papermakers	Wisconsin State League	Andy Latchie and Whitey Gluchoski

LEAGUE CHAMPIONS: Utica, Wilmington, Schenectady, Vandergrift
