= Clint Hartung =

American baseball player (1922–2010)

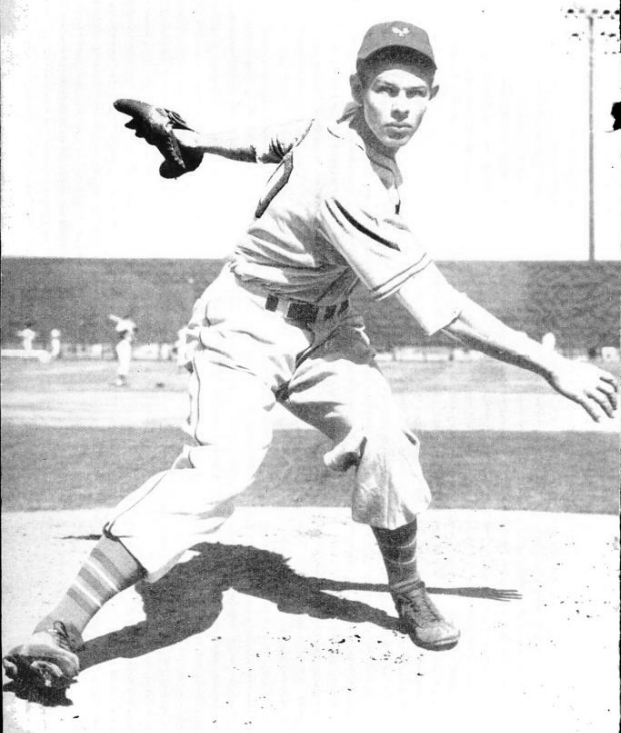
- Hartung in 1947
- Pitcher / Outfielder
- Born: August 10, 1922; Hondo, Texas, U.S.
- Died: July 8, 2010 (aged 87); Sinton, Texas, U.S.
- Batted: Right Threw: Right

MLB debut
- April 15, 1947, for the New York Giants

Last MLB appearance
- September 28, 1952, for the New York Giants

MLB statistics
- Win–loss record: 29–29
- Earned run average: 5.02
- Strikeouts: 167
- Batting average: .238
- Home runs: 14
- Runs batted in: 43
- Stats at Baseball Reference

Teams
- New York Giants (1947–1952)

Clinton Clarence Hartung (August 10, 1922 – July 8, 2010), nicknamed "the Hondo Hurricane", was an American right-handed pitcher and right fielder in Major League Baseball who played with the New York Giants from 1947 to 1952.

== Early years ==
Clinton Clarence Hartung was born in Hondo, Texas, on August 10, 1922. His hometown was the source of his nickname, "the Hondo Hurricane." He stood 6 feet 5 inches (1.96 m) and weighed 220 pounds (100 kg). His high school team won a state baseball championship in 1939.

== Baseball career ==
Originally signed for the Minneapolis Millers, Hartung played for the Eau Claire Bears of the Northern League for two months in 1942, hitting .358 with a .596 slugging percentage and winning three games as a pitcher.

He was then drafted into the Army Air Forces, where he spent the duration of World War II playing on military teams such as the Hickam Field Bombers; for the latter he went 25–0 as a pitcher and batted .567.

A year before his demobilization, the Giants signed him for $35,000, a very high sum, and expectations were proportionally high: Sportswriter Tom Meany later said of him, "Rather than stop at the Polo Grounds they should have taken him straight to Cooperstown." Other reports hailed him as the second coming of Babe Ruth; "he could hit a ball 700 feet and had a bazooka for an arm," James S. Hirsch summed up the exaggerations of Hartung's ability.

In 1947 he finally debuted in the major leagues, but his performance under these conditions quickly proved less stellar. His first season he only managed 9–7 pitching and .306 hitting. In 1948 his stats declined to 8–8 and .179; his pitching never recovered, and 1950 was his last year in that job for the Giants, while his hitting did recover somewhat but he never achieved anything like his earlier numbers. As with some other phenoms, he was noted for doing much better in spring training than he would in the regular season. His fielding was never good, and reportedly he was unable to hit curveballs.

After 1950, he was relieved of his duties as a pitcher and was switched to the outfield—a very rare position shift in the major leagues. Hartung was the 11th player in history whose first homer in the majors was as a pitcher to later hit a home run as a position player; the previous player to do so was Babe Ruth, but the next was not until Rick Ankiel repeated the feat in the 2000s. He was at least present, though passively, as the pinch runner at third base in the 1951 play known as the Shot Heard 'Round the World.

By 1953 he was back in the minor leagues, playing for the AAA Minneapolis Millers. In 1954 and 1955, he played mostly for the Cincinnati Redlegs' AAA farm team the Havana Sugar Kings of the International League. In 1955, he also briefly played for the Nashville Volunteers of the Southern Association, and the Oakland Oaks of the Pacific Coast League.

He played for the Plymouth (Oil Company) Oilers, a nationally known semi-pro team in Sinton, Texas, for several years after leaving the minor leagues.

The baseball statistical reference by Bill James commemorates Hartung with its "Clint Hartung Award", for the most overhyped rookie of each decade (and honors him with one for the 1940s), and baseball-themed musician Terry Cashman wrote a song called "The Hondo Hurricane".

Hartung died at his home in Sinton, Texas, July 8, 2010.
