= Clayton Lambert (baseball) =

American baseball player (1917–1981)

- Pitcher
- Born: March 26, 1917; Summit, Illinois, U.S.
- Died: April 3, 1981 (aged 64); Ogden, Utah, U.S.
- Batted: Right Threw: Right

MLB debut
- April 22, 1946, for the Cincinnati Reds

Last MLB appearance
- April 30, 1947, for the Cincinnati Reds

MLB statistics
- Win–loss record: 2–2
- Earned run average: 5.40
- Strikeouts: 21
- Stats at Baseball Reference

Teams
- Cincinnati Reds (1946–1947)

Clayton Patrick Lambert (March 26, 1917 – April 3, 1981) was an American professional baseball pitcher who appeared in 26 games in Major League Baseball for the Cincinnati Reds in 1946 and 1947. A right-hander, Lambert stood 6 feet 2 inches (1.88 m) tall and weighed 185 pounds (84 kg). He was born in Summit, Illinois, and attended Illinois College.

Lambert entered pro baseball in the Cincinnati farm system as a 22-year-old in 1939. In 1941, hurling for the Ogden Reds of the Class C Pioneer League, he posted a 21–6 won–lost record, and led his circuit in earned run average (2.21) and winning percentage (.778). The following year, he was promoted to top-level Syracuse of the International League, and pitched well, winning seven of ten decisions and lowering his ERA to 1.91. Lambert then missed three seasons, 1943–1945, serving in the United States Army Air Forces during World War II.

Returning to baseball in its first postwar season, he spent 1946 on the Reds' National League roster, appearing in 23 games, 19 of them in relief. Pitching for a second-division club, his year was marked by two highlights, both starting assignments: complete game victories against the Chicago Cubs on August 31 and Philadelphia Phillies on September 19.

Lambert began 1947 on the Reds' early-season roster, but in his first appearance of the year on April 18 against the Pittsburgh Pirates in relief, he was treated harshly, surrendering six hits and seven earned runs in only one inning of work. The Reds lost the contest, 12–11. Lambert worked in two more games, the last on April 28, but when Cincinnati optioned him back to Syracuse at the May cutdown, Lambert retired from the game rather than report.

He returned to Ogden, Utah, site of his 1940 and 1941 seasons, where he appeared in ten games at age 31 before retiring from baseball. He settled in Ogden, where he died at 64 in April 1981.
