= Ray Martin (baseball) =

American baseball player (1925-2013)

- Pitcher
- Born: March 13, 1925; Norwood, Massachusetts, U.S.
- Died: March 7, 2013 (aged 87); Norwood, Massachusetts, U.S.
- Batted: Right Threw: Right

MLB debut
- July 2, 1943, for the Boston Braves

Last MLB appearance
- April 25, 1948, for the Boston Braves

MLB statistics
- Win–loss record: 1–0
- Earned run average: 2.45
- Strikeouts: 3
- Stats at Baseball Reference

Teams
- Boston Braves (1943, 1947–1948)

Raymond Joseph Martin (March 13, 1925 – March 7, 2013) was an American former Major League Baseball pitcher. He played three seasons with the Boston Braves in 1943 and 1947 to 1948.

Marin served with the military police in the United States Army in the European Theater of Operations during World War II.
