= Woody Abernathy (pitcher) =

American baseball player

- Pitcher
- Born: February 1, 1915; Forest City, North Carolina, U.S.
- Died: December 5, 1994 (aged 79); Louisville, Kentucky, U.S.
- Batted: Left Threw: Left

MLB debut
- July 28, 1946, for the New York Giants

Last MLB appearance
- April 17, 1947, for the New York Giants

MLB statistics
- Win–loss record: 1–1
- Earned run average: 3.64
- Strikeouts: 6
- Stats at Baseball Reference

Teams
- New York Giants (1946–1947)

Virgil Woodrow Abernathy (February 1, 1915 – December 5, 1994) was an American professional baseball player whose career spanned six seasons, including parts of two in Major League Baseball with the New York Giants (1946–1947). Abernathy batted and threw left-handed. Abernathy also played in the minor leagues. Over his career in the minors, Abernathy played for the Class-D Salisbury Bees (1938), the Class-C Fort Smith Giants (1942), the Double-A Jersey City Giants (1945), and the Double-A (later Triple-A) Minneapolis Millers (1945–1948). In the majors, Abernathy went 1–1 with a 3.64 earned run average (ERA), one save and six strikeouts in 16 games, one start. In the minors, he went 43–68 in 133 games. After his playing career, Abernathy was a repairman in Chesnee, South Carolina for 30 years.

== Professional career ==
=== Early career ===
In 1939, Abernathy began his professional career with the Class-D Salisbury Bees of the North Carolina State League. The Salisbury team, representing Salisbury, North Carolina, were affiliated with the Boston Bees Major League Baseball franchise. Abernathy took an absence from the professional circuit after the 1939 season. In 1942, Abernathy joined a semi-professional team representing Woodruff, South Carolina. Later that season he joined the Class-C Fort Smith Giants of the Western Association. With Fort Smith, Abernathy went 16–6 in 29 games. After the season, he was tied for third in wins amongst league pitchers. Abernathy was runner-up for the league's best pitcher award that season. During the Western Association playoffs in 1942, Abernathy won two games for the Giants who went on to win the league pennant. Abernathy again left the professional circuit, this time for two seasons. In 1945, Abernathy joined the Double-A Jersey City Giants of the International League, but only pitched one game before he joined the Double-A Minneapolis Millers of the American Association. With the Millers that season, Abernathy went 9–13 with a 4.59 earned run average (ERA) and 80 strikeouts in 32 games, 25 starts. Before the 1946 season, Abernathy tried out for the Class-B Spartanburg Peaches. That season, Abernathy did not play for the Peaches, instead re-joining the Millers of Minneapolis. With the Millers in 1946, Abernathy went 9–9 with a 3.44 ERA in 22 games, 19 starts.

=== New York Giants ===
On July 25, 1946, the New York Giants acquired Abernathy from the Minneapolis Millers in exchange for pitchers Bob Joyce and Rube Fischer, and cash considerations. Abernathy made his major league debut on July 28, 1946, against the Cincinnati Reds. In that game, Abernathy went seven innings giving up five runs (four earned) while striking out two. He got the loss in that game. On September 2, against the Boston Braves, Abernathy got his first and only major league save. Abernathy picked up his first win on September 5, against the Philadelphia Phillies after pitching only 1/3 of an inning. On the season, Abernathy went 1–1 with a 3.38 ERA, one save and six strikeouts in 15 games, one start. In 1947, Abernathy pitched only one game with the Giants giving-up three runs (two earned) in two innings pitched.

=== Later career ===
After completing his tenure with the New York Giants, Abernathy re-joined the Minneapolis Millers. During the 1946 season, Abernathy went 9–10 with a 5.19 ERA and 52 strikeouts in 27 games, 17 starts. During the off-season, Abernathy was plagued with a stomach injury that he cured himself of before the 1948 season. In 1948, Abernathy only pitched two games and stuck out one in one inning pitched.

== Later life ==
Abernathy resided in Chesnee, South Carolina where he worked as a repairman at the Reeves Brothers Textile Plant for 30 years until his retirement. Abernathy died on December 5, 1994, survived by his wife Marry Abernathy née Badgett, his sister Nell Ford, his stepsister Janell Peterson, his half-sister Junie Jones and his brother Wade Abernathy. Abernathy was buried at Resthaven Memorial Park.
