= Fuzz White =

American baseball player (1916-2003)

- Center fielder
- Born: June 27, 1916; Springfield, Missouri, U.S.
- Died: April 24, 2003 (aged 86); Springfield, Missouri, U.S.
- Batted: Left Threw: Right

MLB debut
- September 17, 1940, for the St. Louis Browns

Last appearance
- May 6, 1947, for the New York Giants

MLB statistics
- Batting average: .200
- Hits: 3
- Runs batted in: 0
- Stats at Baseball Reference

Teams
- St. Louis Browns (1940); New York Giants (1947)

Albert Eugene "Fuzz" White (June 27, 1916 – April 24, 2003) was an American Major League Baseball center fielder who played for the St. Louis Browns (1940) and New York Giants (1947). His career was unusual in that he went almost seven years between major league appearances.

During World War II, White served in the Army.

White made his first two major league appearances (September, 1940) as a pinch-hitter, going 0-for-2. Six years later, on November 1, 1946, he was drafted by the New York Giants from the Browns in the 1946 rule V draft. Then, next season, at the age of 31, he played in seven games for the Giants. At the plate he went 3-for-13 with three runs scored, and on defense recorded 11 putouts with no errors.

White died in his hometown of Springfield, Missouri, at the age of 86.
