= Hooks Iott =

American baseball player (1919-1980)

- Pitcher
- Born: December 3, 1919; Mountain Grove, Missouri, U.S.
- Died: April 17, 1980 (aged 60); St. Petersburg, Florida, U.S.
- Batted: Both Threw: Left

MLB debut
- September 6, 1941, for the St. Louis Browns

Last MLB appearance
- September 23, 1947, for the Detroit Tigers

MLB statistics
- Win–loss record: 3–9
- Earned run average: 7.05
- Strikeouts: 53
- Stats at Baseball Reference

Teams
- St. Louis Browns (1941, 1947); New York Giants (1947)

Clarence Eugene "Hooks" Iott (December 3, 1919 – April 17, 1980) was an American professional baseball player. The left-handed pitcher, a native of Mountain Grove, Missouri, worked in 26 games and 81 2/3 innings pitched in Major League Baseball for the St. Louis Browns (1941, 1947) and the New York Giants (1947). He served in the United States Army Air Forces during World War II.

Although Iott pitched only briefly in the Major Leagues, Iott spent 16 seasons playing for 20 different teams in minor league baseball (1938–42; 1946; 1948–57), where he won 175 career games. At Paragould, in the Northeast Arkansas League, he struck out 25 batters in a nine-inning game, and 30 batters in a 15-inning game in 1941.
