= Johnny Neun =

American baseball player (1900–1990)

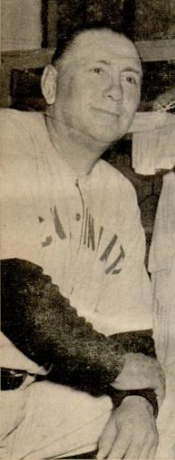
- Neun in 1948
- First baseman / Manager
- Born: October 28, 1900; Baltimore, Maryland, U.S.
- Died: March 28, 1990 (aged 89); Baltimore, Maryland, U.S.
- Batted: Switch Threw: Left

MLB debut
- April 14, 1925, for the Detroit Tigers

Last MLB appearance
- September 27, 1931, for the Boston Braves

MLB statistics
- Batting average: .289
- Home runs: 2
- Runs batted in: 85
- Stats at Baseball Reference

Teams
- As player: Detroit Tigers (1925–1928); Boston Braves (1930–1931); As manager: New York Yankees (1946); Cincinnati Reds (1947–1948)

John Henry Neun (October 28, 1900 – March 28, 1990) was an American professional baseball player and manager. He played in Major League Baseball (MLB) as a first baseman from 1925 to 1931 for the Detroit Tigers and the Boston Braves. Neun completed the seventh unassisted triple play in MLB history. After his playing career he served as the manager for the New York Yankees and the Cincinnati Reds.

== Career ==
Neun was born in Baltimore, Maryland. Although never an everyday player (he never played more than 97 games a season), Neun entered baseball immortality on May 31, 1927 against the Cleveland Indians, when he caught a line drive from Homer Summa, stepped on first to retire Charlie Jamieson, and despite shouts from his shortstop to throw him the ball, raced towards second base to retire Glenn Myatt, completing the seventh unassisted triple play in MLB history, and the first such play to end a game. Neun became the second, and most recent, first baseman to accomplish the feat. It came one day after Jimmy Cooney of the Chicago Cubs turned his own unassisted triple play.

On July 9, 1927, playing against the New York Yankees, Neun had five base hits and five stolen bases. He is the only player since at least 1914 to have at least five of each in one game. Nevertheless, he stole only 41 bases in his career.

A switch-hitter who threw left-handed, Neun batted .289 with two home runs and 85 RBI in 945 at bats during his seven-year Major League Baseball career.

In 1935, after retiring as a player, Neun began managing in the New York Yankees' farm system, and from 1938 through 1941, he piloted the AA Newark Bears, winning International League regular season championships in 1938 (104 wins) and 1941 (100 wins) and the 1938 playoff title. He then spent two seasons as skipper of the Yanks' other top affiliate, the Kansas City Blues of the American Association (where he won another regular-season pennant, in 1942), before joining the New York coaching staff in 1944.

In September 1946, he was hired as the manager of the Yankees, replacing Bill Dickey. His stint in New York lasted only 14 games (8-6) through the third-place Yankees' final regular season game. During the offseason, he was hired by the Cincinnati Reds as the successor to Hall of Fame manager Bill McKechnie. Neun piloted the Reds for all of 1947 and through August 5, 1948, compiling a record of 117–137 (.461). He was dismissed after 100 games in 1948 in favor of Bucky Walters. He continued working in the game, and into his eighties was a scout and instructor for the Milwaukee Brewers.

== Managerial record ==
Team	Year	Regular season					Postseason			
Team	Year	Games	Won	Lost	Win %	Finish	Won	Lost	Win %	Result
NYY	1946	14	8	6	.571	3rd in AL	–	–	–	–
NYY total		14	8	6	.571		0	0	–	
CIN	1947	154	73	81	.474	5th in NL	–	–	–	–
CIN	1948	100	44	56	.440	fired	–	–	–	–
CIN total		254	117	137	.461		0	0	–	
Total		268	125	143	.466		0	0	–	

== Neun and Cooney ==
Despite their joint fame, Neun and Jimmy Cooney never actually met, as they were playing in different leagues. (They did face each other in a minor league game in 1929, but didn't exchange words.) Finally, nearly six decades later, in 1986, Sports Illustrated arranged a conference call between the two.

Neun died of pancreatic cancer in his birthplace of Baltimore at age 89.
