= Doyle Lade =

American baseball player (1921–2000)

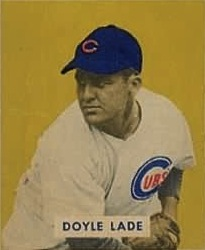
- Lade's 1949 Bowman Gum baseball card
- Pitcher
- Born: February 17, 1921; Fairbury, Nebraska, U.S.
- Died: May 18, 2000 (aged 79); Lincoln, Nebraska, U.S.
- Batted: Right Threw: Right

MLB debut
- September 18, 1946, for the Chicago Cubs

Last MLB appearance
- September 29, 1950, for the Chicago Cubs

MLB statistics
- Win–loss record: 25–29
- Earned run average: 4.39
- Strikeouts: 176
- Stats at Baseball Reference

Teams
- Chicago Cubs (1946–1950)

Doyle Marion "Porky" Lade (February 17, 1921 – May 18, 2000) was a Major League Baseball pitcher who pitched for the Chicago Cubs from 1946 to 1950. Although nicknamed for his stocky frame, Lade was listed as 5 feet 10 inches (1.78 m) tall and 183 pounds (83 kg).

Born in Fairbury, Nebraska, Lade began his baseball career when he was signed by the Cleveland Indians as an amateur free agent in 1941. He spent the 1941 season with Oklahoma City of the Texas League, where he had a 6–10 record and an earned run average (ERA) of 3.66. At the end of the 1941 season, he was traded to Savannah of the South Atlantic League for Hugh Klaerner. On July 8, 1942, while playing for the Shreveport Sports of the Texas League, Lade pitched a no-hitter against San Antonio and won the game 1–0, with his solo home run providing the only run support for Shreveport. In August, he was purchased by the Chicago White Sox effective at the conclusion of the Texas League season, and was considered the top prospect of the four players acquired.

After the 1942 season ended, Lade signed up for military service, and spent the next few years as a member of the United States Coast Guard. When he returned to the White Sox for the 1946 season, he was placed on the original major league roster, but instead began the season for Shreveport. On July 9, 1946, Lade's contract was purchased from the Chicago White Sox by the Chicago Cubs. In his time in the minors in 1946, he won 12 games and at one time pitched 32 consecutive scoreless innings.

Lade made his major league debut on September 18, 1946, and played three games for the Cubs, losing two and finished with a 4.11 ERA. During the 1947 Chicago Cubs season, Lade had career highs in games started with 25, games played with 34, inning pitched with over 187, 11 wins, 10 losses, and a 3.94 ERA. By the end of the season, sportswriters were declaring the White Sox giving up Lade to be a "mistake" on their part. Over the next three season, Lade was primarily used as a spot starter. During the 1948 Chicago Cubs season, he played the first two months of the season before being optioned to Los Angeles to the disappointment of Ralph Kiner, who had hit five home runs off of Lade. He was later recalled and finished the season with the Cubs. He finished the season with a 4.02 ERA, five wins, and six losses in 19 games.

The 1949 Chicago Cubs season saw Lade continue his role as a utility pitcher, pitching in 36 games, starting 13, and finishing 12, going 4–5 with an ERA of 5.00 in the process. Lade put up similar stats during the 1950 Chicago Cubs season. In 34 games, 12 of which he started, he won five, lost six, and had an ERA of 4.74. He was on the Cubs' roster through the winter preceding the 1951 season, but was cut May 15, 1951, to reduce the Cubs to a 25-man roster. This signified the end of his major league career, with Lade having played his last game on September 29, 1950.

As a hitter, Lade was better than average for a pitcher, posting a .220 batting average (36-for-164) with 15 runs, 11 RBI and drawing 14 bases on balls. Defensively, he was a better than average fielding pitcher, recording a .988 fielding percentage, committing only two miscues in 171 total chances in 537.1 innings pitched, which was 27 points higher than the league average at his position.

Lade died on May 18, 2000, in Lincoln, Nebraska, at the age of 79. He was cremated and is interred at the National Memorial Cemetery of Arizona located in Phoenix, Arizona.
