= Mario Picone =

American baseball player (1926-2013)

- Pitcher
- Born: July 5, 1926; Brooklyn, New York, U.S.
- Died: October 23, 2013 (aged 87); Brooklyn, New York, U.S.
- Batted: Right Threw: Right

MLB debut
- September 27, 1947, for the New York Giants

Last MLB appearance
- June 24, 1954, for the Cincinnati Redlegs

MLB statistics
- Win–loss record: 0–2
- Earned run average: 6.30
- Innings pitched: 40
- Stats at Baseball Reference

Teams
- New York Giants (1947; 1952; 1954); Cincinnati Redlegs (1954)

Mario Peter Picone (July 5, 1926 – October 23, 2013), nicknamed "Babe", was an Italian American pitcher in Major League Baseball who played for the New York Giants and the Cincinnati Redlegs in part of three seasons spanning 1947–1954.

Listed at 5 ft 11 in (1.80 m), 180 lb (82 kg), Picone batted and threw right handed. He was born in Brooklyn, New York.

In a 13-game career, Picone posted a 0–2 record and a 6.30 ERA in 13 pitching appearances, including three starts, allowing 28 earned runs on 43 hits and 25 walks, while striking out 11 in 40 innings of work.

Two of his starting assignments accounted for the two losses on his MLB résumé. On September 27, 1952, he opened for the Giants and lasted eight innings against the Philadelphia Phillies, allowing six runs (five earned), in a 7–3 defeat at the Polo Grounds.

Then, on June 13, 1954, in his first appearance for Cincinnati, he faced his hometown Brooklyn Dodgers at Crosley Field and lasted only 4 1/3 innings, giving up five earned runs, including home runs by Duke Snider and Jim Gilliam. Brooklyn eventually won, 14–2.

He also spent 13 seasons in the Minor leagues, playing from 1944 through 1956 for 11 different clubs. His most productive season came in 1952, when he combined a record of 21–8 with a 2.94 for Sioux City and Minneapolis. Besides, he won 19 games in 1945 and amassed four seasons with at least 14 wins.

Overall, in the minors, he went 129–98 with a 3.95 ERA in 186 pitching appearances (82 starts) over 1975.0 innings.

Picone died on October 23, 2013, in Brooklyn at the age of 87. His death was reported six months later.
