= Ken Polivka =

American baseball player (1921–1988)

- Pitcher
- Born: January 21, 1921; Chicago, Illinois, U.S.
- Died: July 23, 1988 (aged 67); Aurora, Illinois, U.S.
- Batted: Left Threw: Left

MLB debut
- April 18, 1947, for the Cincinnati Reds

Last MLB appearance
- April 23, 1947, for the Cincinnati Reds

MLB statistics
- Win–loss record: 0–0
- Earned run average: 3.00
- Strikeouts: 1
- Stats at Baseball Reference

Teams
- Cincinnati Reds (1947)

Kenneth Lyle Polivka (January 21, 1921 – July 23, 1988), nicknamed "Soup", was an American professional baseball player. He was a left-handed pitcher for one season (1947) with the Cincinnati Reds. For his career, he did not record a decision, with a 3.00 earned run average, and one strikeouts in three innings pitched.

He was born in Chicago, Illinois and died in Aurora, Illinois, at the age of 67.
