= Joe Lafata =

American baseball player (1921-2004)

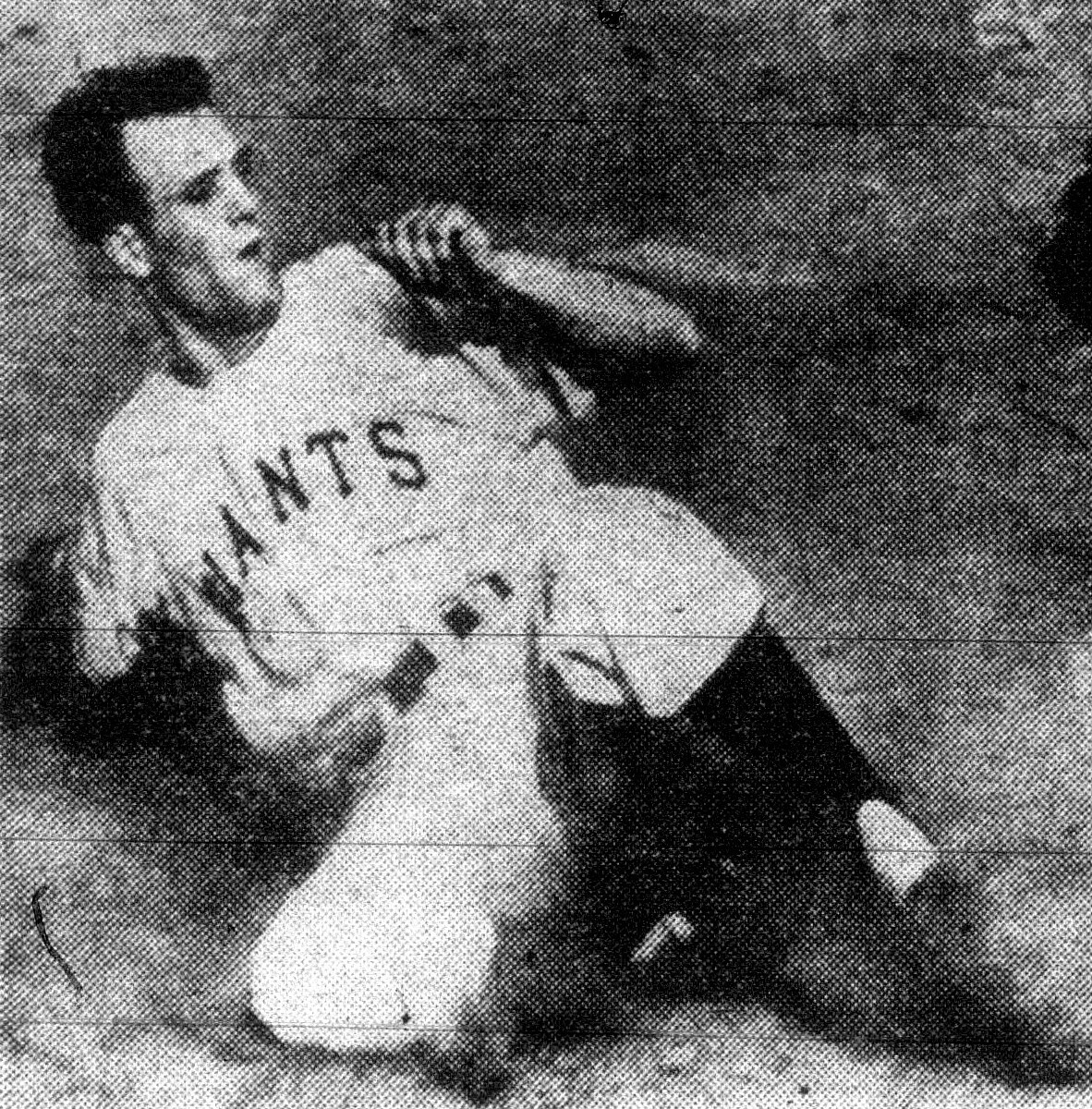
- Lafata in 1949
- First baseman / Outfielder
- Born: August 3, 1921; Detroit, Michigan, U.S.
- Died: May 6, 2004 (aged 82); Roseville, Michigan, U.S.
- Batted: Left Threw: Left

MLB debut
- April 17, 1947, for the New York Giants

Last MLB appearance
- September 25, 1949, for the New York Giants

MLB statistics
- Batting average: .229
- Home runs: 5
- Runs batted in: 34
- Stats at Baseball Reference

Teams
- New York Giants (1947–1949)

Joseph Joseph Lafata (August 3, 1921 – May 6, 2004) was an American professional baseball player who appeared in 127 games as a first baseman, outfielder and pinch hitter in Major League Baseball for the New York Giants over three seasons spanning 1947 to 1949. Born in Detroit, Lafata threw and batted left-handed, and was listed as 6 feet (1.8 m) tall and 163 pounds (74 kg).

Lafata's professional career stretched from 1940 through 1952, with two full years (1943 and 1944) missed due to his World War II United States Army service. He spent the full 1947 and 1949 seasons with the Giants, starting 33 games as a first baseman and 19 as a left fielder. In perhaps his finest MLB game, on June 23, 1949 against the St. Louis Cardinals at Sportsman's Park, he collected three hits in four at bats, including a two-run home run off Cardinals' southpaw Howie Pollet.

All told, he batted .229 in the majors in 236 at bats, with three doubles, two triples, five home runs and 34 runs batted in.

Lafata died on May 6, 2004 in Roseville, Michigan. He is buried in Detroit, Michigan at Mt. Olivet Cemetery.
