= Sal Madrid =

American baseball player (1920–1977)

- Shortstop
- Born: June 9, 1920; El Paso, Texas, U.S.
- Died: February 24, 1977 (aged 56); Fort Wayne, Indiana, U.S.
- Batted: Right Threw: Right

MLB debut
- September 17, 1947, for the Chicago Cubs

Last MLB appearance
- September 28, 1947, for the Chicago Cubs

MLB statistics
- Games played: 8
- At bats: 24
- Hits: 3
- Stats at Baseball Reference

Teams
- Chicago Cubs (1947)

Salvator Madrid (June 9, 1920 – February 24, 1977) was an American shortstop in Major League Baseball. He played for the Chicago Cubs.

Madrid played for the Tulsa Oilers in the Texas League before being called up to the Major Leagues in 1947. He made his Major League debut on September 17, 1947 against the New York Giants at Wrigley Field. Madrid managed only three hits in 24 at bats over eight games with the Cubs. When asked in a radio interview why he was struggling so badly at the Major League level, Madrid reportedly said that it was "too damn hot" in the Texas League and the heat had made him "too damn weak."

Madrid was inducted into the Northeast Indiana Baseball Hall of Fame in 1970.
