= Cliff Aberson =

American baseball and football player (1921–1973)

- Left fielder
- Born: August 28, 1921; Chicago, Illinois, U.S.
- Died: June 23, 1973 (aged 51); Vallejo, California, U.S.
- Batted: Right Threw: Right

MLB debut
- July 18, 1947, for the Chicago Cubs

Last MLB appearance
- May 9, 1949, for the Chicago Cubs

MLB statistics
- Batting average: .251
- Home runs: 5
- Runs batted in: 26
- Stats at Baseball Reference

Teams
- Chicago Cubs (1947–1949)
- Football career
No. 78
- Position: Tailback / defensive back
Personal information
- Listed height: 6 ft 0 in (1.83 m)
- Listed weight: 195 lb (88 kg)
Career information
- High school: Nicolas Senn High School
- College: Green Bay Packers (1946)
Career statistics
- Rushing yards: 161
- Rush attempts: 48
- Passing yards: 184
- TD–INT: 0–5
- Games played: 10
- Stats at Pro Football Reference

Clifford Alexander Aberson (August 28, 1921 – June 23, 1973) was an American Major League Baseball left fielder and football player. Aberson played baseball for the Chicago Cubs for parts of three seasons, from 1947 to 1949. He hit .251 in 63 career games. He also played football for the Green Bay Packers, playing 10 games in 1946.

== Personal life ==
Aberson enlisted in the United States Army Air Forces in 1943. He was transferred to the United States Army by 1945, and took part in the European theatre as a sergeant. He was discharged in March 1946. He died in 1973 in Vallejo, California at the age of 51 following a long battle with cancer.
