= Mike Schultz (1940s pitcher) =

American baseball player (1920–2004)

- Pitcher
- Born: December 17, 1920; Syracuse, New York, U.S.
- Died: August 2, 2004 (aged 83); East Syracuse, New York, U.S.
- Batted: Left Threw: Left

MLB debut
- April 20, 1947, for the Cincinnati Reds

Last MLB appearance
- April 20, 1947, for the Cincinnati Reds

MLB statistics
- Win–loss record: 0–0
- Earned run average: 4.50
- Strikeouts: 0
- Stats at Baseball Reference

Teams
- Cincinnati Reds (1947)

William Michael Schultz (December 17, 1920 – August 2, 2004) was an American professional baseball player. He was a left-handed pitcher for one season (1947) with the Cincinnati Reds. For his career, he did not record a decision, with a 4.50 earned run average in two innings pitched.

He was born in Syracuse, New York and died in East Syracuse, New York, at the age of 83.
