= Bernie Creger =

American baseball player (1927–1997)

- Shortstop
- Born: March 21, 1927; Wytheville, Virginia, U.S.
- Died: November 30, 1997 (aged 70); Lynchburg, Virginia, U.S.
- Batted: Right Threw: Right

MLB debut
- April 29, 1947, for the St. Louis Cardinals

Last MLB appearance
- September 28, 1947, for the St. Louis Cardinals

MLB statistics
- Games played: 15
- At bats: 16
- Hits: 3
- Stats at Baseball Reference

Teams
- St. Louis Cardinals (1947)

Bernard Odell Creger (March 21, 1927 – November 30, 1997) was an American professional baseball shortstop who appeared in 15 games in Major League Baseball for the 1947 St. Louis Cardinals. Creger's pro career began when he was 16 years old and lasted for ten seasons (1943–1952), all but one of them spent in the St. Louis organization. Born in Wytheville, Virginia, he threw and batted right-handed, and was listed as 6 feet (1.8 m) tall and 175 pounds (79 kg).

Creger had only 18 plate appearances for the 1947 Cardinals; he collected three hits—one of them a double—and one base on balls. He was credited with one sacrifice hit and one stolen base. He had no runs batted in. In the field, he played 49 innings during the year and started three late season games at shortstop. He made five errors in 29 total chances for a fielding percentage of .828.
