= Elmer Singleton =

American baseball player (1918–1996)

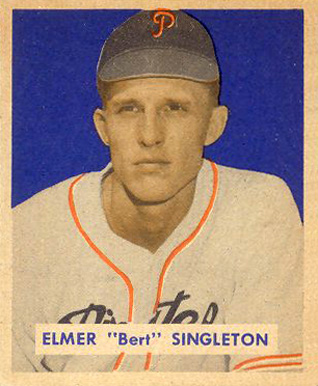
- Pitcher
- Born: June 26, 1918; Ogden, Utah, U.S.
- Died: January 5, 1996 (aged 77); Ogden, Utah, U.S.
- Batted: Right Threw: Right

MLB debut
- August 20, 1945, for the Boston Braves

Last MLB appearance
- August 1, 1959, for the Chicago Cubs

MLB statistics
- Win–loss record: 11–17
- Earned run average: 4.83
- Strikeouts: 160
- Stats at Baseball Reference

Teams
- Boston Braves (1945–1946); Pittsburgh Pirates (1947–1948); Washington Senators (1950); Chicago Cubs (1957–1959)

Bert Elmer Singleton (June 26, 1918 – January 5, 1996) was an American professional baseball player. The right-handed pitcher played all or part of seven seasons in Major League Baseball spread over 15 years (between 1945 and 1959) for the Boston Braves, Pittsburgh Pirates, Washington Senators and Chicago Cubs. His professional career spanned 24 seasons, from 1940 until 1963, missing only 1944 due to voluntary retirement during World War II. A native of Ogden, Utah, he was listed as 6 feet 2 inches (1.88 m) tall and 174 pounds (79 kg).

Singleton worked in 145 games pitched in the big leagues, including 19 as a starter, putting up a record of 11–17 and earned run average of 4.83. He allowed 322 hits and 146 bases on balls, with 160 strikeouts, in 3272/3 innings pitched. He registered two complete games.

He also was part of a notable trade on September 30, 1946, when he was shipped by the Braves to the Pirates in a six-player deal that brought third baseman Bob Elliott to Boston. Elliott would be chosen winner of the National League's 1947 Most Valuable Player Award and lead the Braves to the 1948 NL pennant.

His lengthy minor-league career included 14 seasons in the top-level Pacific Coast League. Singleton appeared in 526 minor-league games overall, and registered 184 career wins (against 186 losses).
