= 1947 Major League Baseball season =

1947 MLB season
- League: American League (AL); National League (NL)
- Sport: Baseball
- Duration: Regular season: April 15 – September 28, 1947; World Series: September 30 – October 6, 1947
- Games: 154
- Teams: 16 (8 per league)

Regular season
- Season MVP: AL: Joe DiMaggio (NYY); NL: Bob Elliott (BSN)
- AL champions: New York Yankees
- AL runners-up: Detroit Tigers
- NL champions: Brooklyn Dodgers
- NL runners-up: St. Louis Cardinals

World Series
- Champions: New York Yankees
- Runners-up: Brooklyn Dodgers

MLB seasons
- ← 1946 1948 →

Locations of teams for the 1942–1953 American League seasons
American League
Locations of teams for the 1943–1952 National League seasons
National League

The 1947 major league baseball season began on April 15, 1947. The regular season ended on September 28, with the Brooklyn Dodgers and New York Yankees as the regular season champions of the National League and American League, respectively. The postseason began with Game 1 of the 44th World Series on September 30 and ended with Game 7 on October 6. In the second iteration of this Subway Series World Series matchup, the Yankees defeated the Dodgers, four games to three, capturing their 11th championship in franchise history, since their previous in 1943. Going into the season, the defending World Series champions were the St. Louis Cardinals from the 1946 season.

The 14th All-Star Game was held on July 8 at Wrigley Field in Chicago, Illinois, home of the Chicago Cubs. The American League won, 2–1.

The 1947 season is most notable as the year that the baseball color line broke, thanks to the Brooklyn Dodgers starting Jackie Robinson on Opening Day.

== Integration: Breaking the color line ==
On April 15, Opening Day for the National League's Brooklyn Dodgers, Jackie Robinson was in the Dodgers' lineup, playing first base against the Boston Braves at Ebbets Field. His appearance in a major league game broke the baseball color line, the practice of excluding players of black African descent. Though he endured epithets, death threats and other abuses, as well as a slow start, his skill would earn him the first ever Rookie of the Year award, named in Robinson's honor 40 years later.

Halfway through the season, Larry Doby became the first black player in the American League when he started in center field for the Cleveland Indians on July 5. Doby, a more low-key figure, suffered many of the same indignities that Robinson did, albeit with less press coverage.

Kansas City Monarchs star Willard Brown and teammate Hank Thompson briefly played for the St. Louis Browns, becoming the third and fourth Black players in either the NL or AL, and made the St. Louis Browns the first of either the NL or AL to field two Black players on one roster. Brown was the first black player to hit a home run in the American League.

== Schedule ==
The 1947 schedule consisted of 154 games for all teams in the American League and National League, each of which had eight teams. Each team was scheduled to play 22 games against the other seven teams of their respective league. This continued the format put in place since the 1904 season (except for 1919) and would be used until 1961 in the American League and 1962 in the National League.

Opening Day took place on April 15, featuring all sixteen teams, continuing the trend from 1945. The final day of the regular season was on September 28, which also saw all sixteen teams play, continuing the trend from the previous season. This was the first time since 1940 that all sixteen teams played their first and last games on the same days. The World Series took place between September 30 and October 6.

== Rule changes ==
The 1947 season saw the following rule changes:

- Regarding salaries and pensions, major-league players would be guaranteed:
  - A minimum salary of $5,000 (equivalent to $72,100 in 2025).
  - A limitation on pay cuts to a maximum of 25%
  - $25 per week (equivalent to $360 in 2025) in living expenses during spring training
  - The creation of a pension plan. Said plan was to be funded by each player contributing $250 per year (equivalent to $3,600 in 2025), a sum that would be matched by his owner.
    - Proceeds from the World Series broadcasting and the All-Star Game would go to the pension plan.
- A team claiming a player through waiver calls on the third call would get said player. Previously, owners had been able to retain players put on waivers, regardless of whether another team claimed them or not.
- The Commissioner of Baseball could no longer unilaterally rule on items "detrimental" to baseball on minor-leagues, and now followed the major-league rule that was implemented the previous season, that the commissioner had the authority to determine when a rule or act was harmful to baseball and to block the implementation of such a rule.
- A new Major-Minor League Agreement established a classification labeled Bonus Players for both the major and minors. The designation was assigned to newly signed players who were paid bonus money above defined amounts. The fixed minimum amount that would trigger a bonus classification ranged from $600 (equivalent to $8,650 in 2025) in Class D to $6,000 (equivalent to $86,500 in 2025) in the majors. A Bonus Player would retain the label for his career. If he was optioned to a lower classification or playing level, he would be subject to an unrestricted draft.

== Teams ==
League	Team	City	Ballpark	Capacity	Manager
American League	Boston Red Sox	Boston, Massachusetts	Fenway Park	35,500	Joe Cronin
American League	Chicago White Sox	Chicago, Illinois	Comiskey Park	47,400	Ted Lyons
American League	Cleveland Indians	Cleveland, Ohio	Cleveland Stadium	78,811	Lou Boudreau
American League	Detroit Tigers	Detroit, Michigan	Briggs Stadium	58,000	Steve O'Neill
American League	New York Yankees	New York, New York	Yankee Stadium	70,000	Bucky Harris
American League	Philadelphia Athletics	Philadelphia, Pennsylvania	Shibe Park	33,166	Connie Mack
American League	St. Louis Browns	St. Louis, Missouri	Sportsman's Park	31,250	Muddy Ruel
American League	Washington Senators	Washington, D.C.	Griffith Stadium	32,000	Ossie Bluege
National League	Boston Braves	Boston, Massachusetts	Braves Field	36,706	Billy Southworth
National League	Brooklyn Dodgers	New York, New York	Ebbets Field	34,219	Clyde Sukeforth
National League	Brooklyn Dodgers	New York, New York	Ebbets Field	34,219	Burt Shotton
National League	Chicago Cubs	Chicago, Illinois	Wrigley Field	38,396	Charlie Grimm
National League	Cincinnati Reds	Cincinnati, Ohio	Crosley Field	30,101	Johnny Neun
National League	New York Giants	New York, New York	Polo Grounds	54,500	Mel Ott
National League	Philadelphia Phillies	Philadelphia, Pennsylvania	Shibe Park	33,166	Ben Chapman
National League	Pittsburgh Pirates	Pittsburgh, Pennsylvania	Forbes Field	33,730	Billy Herman
National League	Pittsburgh Pirates	Pittsburgh, Pennsylvania	Forbes Field	33,730	Bill Burwell
National League	St. Louis Cardinals	St. Louis, Missouri	Sportsman's Park	31,250	Eddie Dyer

== Standings ==
=== American League ===
American League
Team	W	L	Pct.	GB	Home	Road
New York Yankees	97	57	.630	—	55‍–‍22	42‍–‍35
Detroit Tigers	85	69	.552	12	46‍–‍31	39‍–‍38
Boston Red Sox	83	71	.539	14	49‍–‍30	34‍–‍41
Cleveland Indians	80	74	.519	17	38‍–‍39	42‍–‍35
Philadelphia Athletics	78	76	.506	19	39‍–‍38	39‍–‍38
Chicago White Sox	70	84	.455	27	32‍–‍43	38‍–‍41
Washington Senators	64	90	.416	33	36‍–‍41	28‍–‍49
St. Louis Browns	59	95	.383	38	29‍–‍48	30‍–‍47

=== National League ===
National League
Team	W	L	Pct.	GB	Home	Road
Brooklyn Dodgers	94	60	.610	—	52‍–‍25	42‍–‍35
St. Louis Cardinals	89	65	.578	5	46‍–‍31	43‍–‍34
Boston Braves	86	68	.558	8	50‍–‍27	36‍–‍41
New York Giants	81	73	.526	13	45‍–‍31	36‍–‍42
Cincinnati Reds	73	81	.474	21	42‍–‍35	31‍–‍46
Chicago Cubs	69	85	.448	25	36‍–‍43	33‍–‍42
Philadelphia Phillies	62	92	.403	32	38‍–‍38	24‍–‍54
Pittsburgh Pirates	62	92	.403	32	32‍–‍45	30‍–‍47

=== Tie games ===
11 tie games (7 in AL, 4 in NL), which are not factored into winning percentage or games behind (and were often replayed again) occurred throughout the season.

==== American League ====
- Boston Red Sox, 3
- Chicago White Sox, 1
- Cleveland Indians, 3
- Detroit Tigers, 4
- New York Yankees, 1
- Philadelphia Athletics, 2

==== National League ====
- Brooklyn Dodgers, 1
- Chicago Cubs, 1
- New York Giants, 1
- Philadelphia Phillies, 1
- Pittsburgh Pirates, 2
- St. Louis Cardinals, 2

== Postseason ==
The postseason began on September 30 and ended on October 6 with the New York Yankees defeating the Brooklyn Dodgers in the 1947 World Series in seven games.

=== Bracket ===
World Series
AL	New York Yankees	4
NL	Brooklyn Dodgers	3

== Managerial changes ==
=== Off-season ===
Team	Former Manager	New Manager
Brooklyn Dodgers	Leo Durocher	Clyde Sukeforth
Cincinnati Reds	Hank Gowdy	Johnny Neun
New York Yankees	Johnny Neun	Bucky Harris
Pittsburgh Pirates	Spud Davis	Billy Herman
St. Louis Browns	Zack Taylor	Muddy Ruel

=== In-season ===
Team	Former Manager	New Manager
Brooklyn Dodgers	Clyde Sukeforth	Burt Shotton
Pittsburgh Pirates	Billy Herman	Bill Burwell

== League leaders ==
=== American League ===
Hitting leaders
Stat	Player	Total
AVG	Ted Williams^{1} (BOS)	.343
OPS	Ted Williams (BOS)	1.133
HR	Ted Williams^{1} (BOS)	32
RBI	Ted Williams^{1} (BOS)	114
R	Ted Williams (BOS)	125
H	Johnny Pesky (BOS)	207
SB	Bob Dillinger (SLB)	34

^{1} American League Triple Crown batting winner

Pitching leaders
Stat	Player	Total
W	Bob Feller (CLE)	20
L	Hal Newhouser (DET)	17
ERA	Joe Haynes (CWS)	2.42
K	Bob Feller (CLE)	196
IP	Bob Feller (CLE)	299.0
SV	Ed Klieman (CLE); Joe Page (NYY)	17
WHIP	Bob Feller (CLE)	1.194

=== National League ===
Hitting leaders
Stat	Player	Total
AVG	Harry Walker (PHI/STL)	.363
OPS	Ralph Kiner (PIT)	1.055
HR	Ralph Kiner (PIT); Johnny Mize (NYG)	51
RBI	Johnny Mize (NYG)	138
R	Johnny Mize (NYG)	137
H	Tommy Holmes (BSN)	191
SB	Jackie Robinson (BRO)	29

Pitching leaders
Stat	Player	Total
W	Ewell Blackwell (CIN)	22
L	Johnny Schmitz (CHC)	18
ERA	Warren Spahn (BSN)	2.33
K	Ewell Blackwell (CIN)	193
IP	Warren Spahn (BSN)	289.2
SV	Hugh Casey (BRO)	18
WHIP	Warren Spahn (BSN)	1.136

== Milestones ==
=== Batters ===
==== Cycles ====
- Bobby Doerr (BOS):
  - Doerr hit for his second cycle and 12th in franchise history, on May 13 against the Chicago White Sox.
- Vic Wertz (DET):
  - Wertz hit for his first cycle and fifth in franchise history, in game one of a doubleheader on September 14 against the Washington Senators.

==== Other batting accomplishments ====
- Walker Cooper (NYG):
  - Tied a Major League record by becoming the fourth player and second National League player to hit home runs in six consecutive games between June 22 and 28.

=== Pitchers ===
==== No-hitters ====
- Ewell Blackwell (CIN):
  - Blackwell threw his first career no-hitter and ninth no-hitter in franchise history, by defeating the Boston Braves 6–0 on June 18. Blackwell walked four and struck out three.
- Don Black (CLE):
  - Black threw his first career no-hitter and eighth no-hitter in franchise history, by defeating the Philadelphia Athletics 3–0 in game one of a doubleheader on July 10. Black walked six and struck out five.
- Bill McCahan (PHA):
  - McCahan threw his first career no-hitter and fifth no-hitter in franchise history, by defeating the Washington Senators 3–0 on September 3. McCahan walked none and struck out two.

== Awards and honors ==
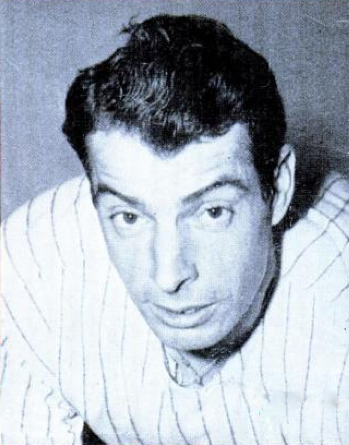
Joe DiMaggio (1951)

=== Regular season ===
Baseball Writers' Association of America Awards
BBWAA Award	National League	American League
Rookie of the Year	Jackie Robinson (BRO)	—
Most Valuable Player	Bob Elliott (BSN)	Joe DiMaggio (NYY)

=== Other awards ===
The Sporting News Awards
Award	National League	American League
Player of the Year	—	Ted Williams (BOS)
Rookie of the Year	Jackie Robinson (BRO)	—
Manager of the Year	—	Bucky Harris (NYY)
Executive of the Year	Branch Rickey (BRO)	—

=== Baseball Hall of Fame ===
- Carl Hubbell
- Frankie Frisch
- Mickey Cochrane
- Lefty Grove

== Home field attendance ==
Team name	Wins	%±	Home attendance	%±	Per game
New York Yankees	97	11.5%	2,178,937	−3.8%	28,298
Brooklyn Dodgers	94	−2.1%	1,807,526	0.6%	23,173
New York Giants	81	32.8%	1,600,793	31.2%	21,063
Cleveland Indians	80	17.6%	1,521,978	44.0%	19,513
Boston Red Sox	83	−20.2%	1,427,315	0.7%	17,621
Detroit Tigers	85	−7.6%	1,398,093	−18.8%	17,476
Chicago Cubs	69	−15.9%	1,364,039	1.6%	17,266
Pittsburgh Pirates	62	−1.6%	1,283,531	71.1%	16,247
Boston Braves	86	6.2%	1,277,361	31.7%	16,589
St. Louis Cardinals	89	−9.2%	1,247,913	17.5%	16,207
Philadelphia Athletics	78	59.2%	911,566	46.6%	11,687
Philadelphia Phillies	62	−10.1%	907,332	−13.2%	11,784
Cincinnati Reds	73	9.0%	899,975	25.7%	11,688
Chicago White Sox	70	−5.4%	876,948	−10.8%	11,693
Washington Senators	64	−15.8%	850,758	−17.2%	11,049
St. Louis Browns	59	−10.6%	320,474	−39.1%	4,162

== Venues ==
After playing at both League Park (where they played 45 seasons in part or in full) and Cleveland Stadium (where they played 13 season in part or in full) since 1932 (sans 1933 through 1935), the Cleveland Indians permanently move into Cleveland Stadium leaving their inaugural park, having played at League Park for 45 seasons (every season since 1901 excluding 1933). Previously, the Indians would typically play home games at League Park on weekdays and Cleveland Stadium on weekends. They would go on to play at Cleveland Stadium for a total of 60 seasons through 1993.

== See also ==
- 1947 in baseball (Events, Births, Deaths)
- 1947 All-American Girls Professional Baseball League season
