= 1948 St. Louis Cardinals season =

Major League Baseball season

1948 St. Louis Cardinals
- League: National League
- Ballpark: Sportsman's Park
- City: St. Louis, Missouri
- Record: 85–69 (.552)
- League place: 2nd
- Owners: Fred Saigh; Robert Hannegan
- General managers: William Walsingham Jr.
- Managers: Eddie Dyer
- Television: KSD (Bob Ingham)
- Radio: WTMV/WEW (Harry Caray, Gabby Street)
- Stats: ESPN.com; Baseball Reference

The 1948 St. Louis Cardinals season was the team's 67th season in St. Louis, Missouri and the 57th season in the National League. The Cardinals went 85–69 during the season and finished second in the National League.

== Regular season ==
Outfielder Stan Musial won the MVP Award this year, batting .376, with 39 home runs and 131 RBIs. Musial became the first player to win three National League MVP Awards.

=== Season standings ===
National League
Team	W	L	Pct.	GB	Home	Road
Boston Braves	91	62	.595	—	45‍–‍31	46‍–‍31
St. Louis Cardinals	85	69	.552	6½	44‍–‍33	41‍–‍36
Brooklyn Dodgers	84	70	.545	7½	36‍–‍41	48‍–‍29
Pittsburgh Pirates	83	71	.539	8½	47‍–‍31	36‍–‍40
New York Giants	78	76	.506	13½	37‍–‍40	41‍–‍36
Philadelphia Phillies	66	88	.429	25½	32‍–‍44	34‍–‍44
Cincinnati Reds	64	89	.418	27	32‍–‍45	32‍–‍44
Chicago Cubs	64	90	.416	27½	35‍–‍42	29‍–‍48

=== Record vs. opponents ===
1948 National League record Sources:
Team	BSN	BRO	CHC	CIN	NYG	PHI	PIT	STL
Boston	—	14–8	16–6–1	13–8	11–11	14–8	12–10	11–11
Brooklyn	8–14	—	11–11	18–4	11–11–1	15–7	9–13	12–10
Chicago	6–16–1	11–11	—	10–12	11–11	7–15	8–14	11–11
Cincinnati	8–13	4–18	12–10	—	10–12	11–11	9–13	10–12
New York	11–11	11–11–1	11–11	12–10	—	14–8	12–10	7–15
Philadelphia	8–14	7–15	15–7	11–11	8–14	—	12–10–1	5–17
Pittsburgh	10–12	13–9	14–8	13–9	10–12	10–12–1	—	13–9–1
St. Louis	11–11	10–12	11–11	12–10	15–7	17–5	9–13–1	—

=== Notable transactions ===
- April 7, 1948: Dick Sisler was traded by the Cardinals to the Philadelphia Phillies for Ralph LaPointe and $30,000.

=== Roster ===
1948 St. Louis Cardinals
Roster
Pitchers: 37 Clarence Beers; 27 Al Brazle; 31 Harry Brecheen; 10 Ken Burkhart; 22 Murry Dickson; 34 Jim Hearn; 35 Ken Johnson; 20 Red Munger; 36 Al Papai; 11 Howie Pollet; 14 Gerry Staley; 28 Ted Wilks; 39 Ray Yochim	Catchers: 15 Bill Baker; 24 Johnny Bucha; 17 Joe Garagiola; 18 Del Rice; 23 Del Wilber; Infielders: 19 Nippy Jones; 12 Eddie Kazak; 1 Whitey Kurowski; 29 Don Lang; 16 Ralph LaPointe; 4 Marty Marion; 2 Red Schoendienst; 10 Babe Young; 3 Bobby Young	Outfielders: 32 Chuck Diering; 7 Erv Dusak; 21,12 Joe Medwick; 8 Terry Moore; 6 Stan Musial; 5 Ron Northey; 21 Hal Rice; 9 Enos Slaughter; Other batters: 3 Jeff Cross; 41 Larry Miggins	Manager: 30 Eddie Dyer; Coaches: 25 Tony Kaufmann; 26 Buzzy Wares

== Player stats ==
=== Batting ===
==== Starters by position ====
Note: Pos = Position; G = Games played; AB = At bats; H = Hits; Avg. = Batting average; HR = Home runs; RBI = Runs batted in

Pos	Player	G	AB	H	Avg.	HR	RBI
C	Del Rice	100	290	57	.197	4	34
1B	Nippy Jones	132	481	122	.254	10	81
2B	Red Schoendienst	119	408	111	.272	4	36
SS	Marty Marion	144	567	143	.252	4	43
3B	Don Lang	117	323	87	.269	4	31
OF	Stan Musial	155	611	230	.376	39	131
OF	Enos Slaughter	146	549	176	.321	11	90
OF	Terry Moore	91	207	48	.232	4	18

==== Other batters ====
Note: G = Games played; AB = At bats; H = Hits; Avg. = Batting average; HR = Home runs; RBI = Runs batted in

Player	G	AB	H	Avg.	HR	RBI
Erv Dusak	114	311	65	.209	6	19
Ron Northey	96	246	79	.321	13	64
Ralph LaPointe	87	222	50	.225	0	15
Whitey Kurowski	77	220	47	.214	2	33
Bill Baker	45	119	35	.294	0	15
Babe Young	41	111	27	.243	1	13
Del Wilber	27	58	11	.190	0	10
Joe Garagiola	24	56	6	.107	2	7
Hal Rice	8	31	10	.323	0	3
Eddie Kazak	6	22	6	.273	0	2
Joe Medwick	20	19	4	.211	0	2
Chuck Diering	7	7	0	.000	0	0
Johnny Bucha	2	1	0	.000	0	0
Bobby Young	3	1	0	.000	0	0
Larry Miggins	1	1	0	.000	0	0
Jeff Cross	2	0	0	----	0	0

=== Pitching ===
==== Starting pitchers ====
Note: G = Games pitched; IP = Innings pitched; W = Wins; L = Losses; ERA = Earned run average; SO = Strikeouts

Player	G	IP	W	L	ERA	SO
Murry Dickson	42	252.1	12	16	4.14	113
Harry Brecheen	33	233.1	20	7	2.24	149
Howie Pollet	36	186.1	13	8	4.54	80

==== Other pitchers ====
Note: G = Games pitched; IP = Innings pitched; W = Wins; L = Losses; ERA = Earned run average; SO = Strikeouts

Player	G	IP	W	L	ERA	SO
Red Munger	39	166.0	10	11	4.50	72
Al Brazle	42	156.1	10	6	3.80	55
Jim Hearn	34	89.2	8	6	4.22	27
Ken Johnson	13	45.1	2	4	4.76	20

==== Relief pitchers ====
Note: G = Games pitched; W = Wins; L = Losses; SV = Saves; ERA = Earned run average; SO = Strikeouts

Player	G	W	L	SV	ERA	SO
Ted Wilks	57	6	6	13	2.62	71
Gerry Staley	31	4	4	0	6.92	23
Ken Burkhart	20	0	0	1	5.54	16
Al Papai	10	0	1	0	5.06	8
Erv Dusak	1	0	0	0	0.00	0
Ray Yochim	1	0	0	0	0.00	1
Clarence Beers	1	0	0	0	13.50	0

== Farm system ==
Level	Team	League	Manager
AAA	Columbus Red Birds	American Association	Hal Anderson
AAA	Rochester Red Wings	International League	Cedric Durst
AA	Houston Buffaloes	Texas League	Johnny Keane
A	Columbus Cardinals	Sally League	Kemp Wicker
A	Omaha Cardinals	Western League	Ollie Vanek
B	Allentown Cardinals	Interstate League	Al Hollingsworth
B	Lynchburg Cardinals	Piedmont League	Vernon Mackie
C	Fresno Cardinals	California League	Stan Benjamin
C	Winston-Salem Cardinals	Carolina League	Zip Payne
C	Duluth Dukes	Northern League	George Treadwell and Ed Madjeski
C	Pocatello Cardinals	Pioneer League	Roland LeBlanc
C	St. Joseph Cardinals	Western Association	Harold Olt
D	Johnson City Cardinals	Appalachian League	Specs Garbee
D	Salisbury Cardinals	Eastern Shore League	Gene Corbett
D	Willows Cardinals	Far West League	Jim Tyack and Bill Krueger

Level	Team	League	Manager
D	Tallassee Indians	Georgia–Alabama League	Hugh East and Bob Comiskey
D	Albany Cardinals	Georgia–Florida League	Bob Stanton
D	West Frankfort Cardinals	Illinois State League	Harold Contini
D	Carthage Cardinals	Kansas–Oklahoma–Missouri League	Alvin Kluttz
D	Hamilton Red Birds	PONY League	George Kissell
D	Lawrenceville Cardinals	Virginia League	Bob Comiskey, George Shearin and John Pruett

LEAGUE CHAMPIONS: St. Joseph, West Frankfort
