= 1948 New York Giants (MLB) season =

1948 New York Giants
- League: National League
- Ballpark: Polo Grounds
- City: New York
- Record: 78–76 (.506)
- League place: 5th
- Owners: Horace Stoneham
- General managers: Chub Feeney
- Managers: Mel Ott, Leo Durocher
- Television: WNBT (Steve Ellis)
- Radio: WMCA (Frankie Frisch, Maury Farrell)

The 1948 New York Giants season was the franchise's 66th season. The team finished in fifth place in the National League with a 78–76 record, 13½ games behind the Boston Braves.

== Offseason ==
- November 20, 1947: 1947 minor league draft
  - Hoyt Wilhelm was drafted by the Giants from the Boston Braves.
  - Ed Albrecht was drafted from the Giants by the St. Louis Browns.
  - Pete Milne was drafted by the Giants from the Cleveland Indians.
- Prior to 1948 season: Marv Grissom was acquired from the Giants by the Sacramento Solons.

== Regular season ==
=== Season standings ===
National League
Team	W	L	Pct.	GB	Home	Road
Boston Braves	91	62	.595	—	45‍–‍31	46‍–‍31
St. Louis Cardinals	85	69	.552	6½	44‍–‍33	41‍–‍36
Brooklyn Dodgers	84	70	.545	7½	36‍–‍41	48‍–‍29
Pittsburgh Pirates	83	71	.539	8½	47‍–‍31	36‍–‍40
New York Giants	78	76	.506	13½	37‍–‍40	41‍–‍36
Philadelphia Phillies	66	88	.429	25½	32‍–‍44	34‍–‍44
Cincinnati Reds	64	89	.418	27	32‍–‍45	32‍–‍44
Chicago Cubs	64	90	.416	27½	35‍–‍42	29‍–‍48

=== Record vs. opponents ===
1948 National League record Sources:
Team	BSN	BRO	CHC	CIN	NYG	PHI	PIT	STL
Boston	—	14–8	16–6–1	13–8	11–11	14–8	12–10	11–11
Brooklyn	8–14	—	11–11	18–4	11–11–1	15–7	9–13	12–10
Chicago	6–16–1	11–11	—	10–12	11–11	7–15	8–14	11–11
Cincinnati	8–13	4–18	12–10	—	10–12	11–11	9–13	10–12
New York	11–11	11–11–1	11–11	12–10	—	14–8	12–10	7–15
Philadelphia	8–14	7–15	15–7	11–11	8–14	—	12–10–1	5–17
Pittsburgh	10–12	13–9	14–8	13–9	10–12	10–12–1	—	13–9–1
St. Louis	11–11	10–12	11–11	12–10	15–7	17–5	9–13–1	—

=== Roster ===
1948 New York Giants
Roster
Pitchers: 38 Hub Andrews; 33 Joe Beggs; 33 Clem Dreisewerd; 49 Paul Erickson; 40 Jack Hallett; 44 Andy Hansen; 23 Clint Hartung; 46 Larry Jansen; 37 Sheldon Jones; 32 Monte Kennedy; 36 Alex Konikowski; 31 Dave Koslo; 49 Thornton Lee; 50 Lou Lombardo; 36 Mickey McGowan; 48 Bobo Newsom; 30 Ray Poat; 34 Ken Trinkle; 29 Red Webb	Catchers: 5 Walker Cooper; 8 Mickey Livingston; 6 Wes Westrum; 45 Sal Yvars; Infielders: 17 Buddy Blattner; 28 Jack Conway; 28 Lonny Frey; 20 Sid Gordon; 8 Jack Harshman; 10 Buddy Kerr; 16 Jack Lohrke; 14 Johnny McCarthy; 15 Johnny Mize; 12,22 Bobby Rhawn; 18 Bill Rigney	Outfielders: 33 Hal Bamberger; 21 Les Layton; 25 Whitey Lockman; 27 Willard Marshall; 39 Pete Milne; 22 Don Mueller; 19 Bobby Thomson; Other batters: 26 Joe Lafata	Manager: 2 Leo Durocher; 4 Mel Ott; Coaches: 3 Hank Gowdy; 1 Travis Jackson; 2,7 Red Kress

== Player stats ==
=== Batting ===
==== Starters by position ====
Note: Pos = Position; G = Games played; AB = At bats; H = Hits; Avg. = Batting average; HR = Home runs; RBI = Runs batted in

Pos	Player	G	AB	H	Avg.	HR	RBI
C	Walker Cooper	91	290	77	.266	16	54
1B	Johnny Mize	152	560	162	.289	40	125
2B	Bill Rigney	113	424	112	.264	10	43
SS	Buddy Kerr	144	496	119	.240	0	46
3B	Sid Gordon	142	521	156	.299	30	107
OF	Willard Marshall	143	537	146	.272	14	86
OF	Whitey Lockman	146	584	167	.286	18	59
OF	Bobby Thomson	138	471	117	.248	16	63

==== Other batters ====
Note: G = Games played; AB = At bats; H = Hits; Avg. = Batting average; HR = Home runs; RBI = Runs batted in

Player	G	AB	H	Avg.	HR	RBI
Jack Lohrke	97	280	70	.250	5	31
Wes Westrum	66	125	20	.160	4	16
Mickey Livingston	45	99	21	.212	2	12
Les Layton	63	91	21	.231	2	12
Don Mueller	36	81	29	.358	1	9
Johnny McCarthy	56	57	15	.263	2	12
Lonny Frey	29	51	13	.255	1	6
Jack Conway	24	49	12	.245	1	3
Bobby Rhawn	36	44	12	.273	1	8
Sal Yvars	15	38	8	.211	1	6
Pete Milne	12	27	6	.222	0	2
Buddy Blattner	8	20	4	.200	0	0
Hal Bamberger	7	12	1	.083	0	0
Jack Harshman	5	8	2	.250	0	1
Joe Lafata	1	1	0	.000	0	0

=== Pitching ===
==== Starting pitchers ====
Note: G = Games pitched; IP = Innings pitched; W = Wins; L = Losses; ERA = Earned run average; SO = Strikeouts

Player	G	IP	W	L	ERA	SO
Larry Jansen	42	277.0	18	12	3.61	126

==== Other pitchers ====
Note: G = Games pitched; IP = Innings pitched; W = Wins; L = Losses; ERA = Earned run average; SO = Strikeouts

Player	G	IP	W	L	ERA	SO
Sheldon Jones	55	201.1	16	8	3.35	82
Ray Poat	39	157.2	11	10	4.34	57
Clint Hartung	36	153.1	8	8	4.75	42
Dave Koslo	35	149.0	8	10	3.87	58
Monte Kennedy	25	114.1	3	9	4.01	63
Andy Hansen	36	100.0	5	3	2.97	27
Thornton Lee	11	32.2	1	3	4.41	17
Red Webb	5	28.0	2	1	3.21	9
Bobo Newsom	11	25.2	0	4	4.21	9

==== Relief pitchers ====
Note: G = Games pitched; W = Wins; L = Losses; SV = Saves; ERA = Earned run average; SO = Strikeouts

Player	G	W	L	SV	ERA	SO
Ken Trinkle	53	4	5	7	3.18	20
Alex Konikowski	22	2	3	1	7.56	9
Clem Dreisewerd	4	0	0	1	5.68	2
Mickey McGowan	3	0	0	0	7.36	2
Lou Lombardo	2	0	0	0	6.75	0
Jack Hallett	2	0	0	0	4.50	3
Paul Erickson	2	0	0	0	0.00	1
Hub Andrews	1	0	0	0	0.00	0
Joe Beggs	1	0	0	0	0.00	0

== Farm system ==
Level	Team	League	Manager
AAA	Minneapolis Millers	American Association	Frank Shellenback and Billy Herman
AAA	Jersey City Giants	International League	Bruno Betzel
A	Jacksonville Tars	Sally League	Johnny Hudson
A	Sioux City Soos	Western League	Joe Becker
B	Trenton Giants	Interstate League	Tommy Heath
B	Richmond Colts	Piedmont League	Charlie "Greek" George
B	Knoxville Smokies	Tri-State League	Dale Alexander and Dave Garcia
C	Ogdensburg Maples	Border League	Russ Wein
C	Quebec Alouettes	Canadian–American League	Tony Ravish and Bernie Woycik
C	Erie Sailors	Middle Atlantic League	Donald Ramsay
C	St. Cloud Rox	Northern League	Charlie Fox
C	Reno Silver Sox	Sunset League	Tom Lloyd
C	Fort Smith Giants	Western Association	Jack Aragón
D	Bristol Twins	Appalachian League	Rufus Jackson and Dale Alexander
D	Seaford Eagles	Eastern Shore League	Robert Westfall and Socks Seibold
D	Pittsburg/Roseville Diamonds	Far West League	Gus Suhr, Arnold Rose and Bill Shewey
D	Sanford Giants	Florida State League	Hal Gruber

Level	Team	League	Manager
D	Chanute Giants	Kansas–Oklahoma–Missouri League	Al Smith
D	Hickory Rebels	North Carolina State League	Sammy Bell
D	Springfield Giants	Ohio–Indiana League	Robert Roth and Rufus Jackson
D	Lawton Giants	Sooner State League	Louis Brower
D	Oshkosh Giants	Wisconsin State League	Ray Lucas

LEAGUE CHAMPIONS: Sioux City, Trenton, Ogdensburg, Erie, Reno
Pittsburg franchise moved to Roseville, July 30, 1948
