= 1948 Brooklyn Dodgers season =

1948 Brooklyn Dodgers
- League: National League
- Ballpark: Ebbets Field
- City: Brooklyn, New York
- Record: 84–70 (.545)
- League place: 3rd
- Owners: James & Dearie Mulvey, Walter O'Malley, Branch Rickey, John L. Smith
- President: Branch Rickey
- Managers: Leo Durocher, Ray Blades, Burt Shotton
- Radio: WMGM; Red Barber, Connie Desmond, Ernie Harwell

Leo Durocher returned as manager of the Brooklyn Dodgers to start the 1948 season but was fired in mid-season. He was replaced first by team coach Ray Blades and then by Burt Shotton, who had managed the team to the 1947 pennant. The Dodgers finished third in the National League after this tumultuous season.

The 1948 Dodgers were very much a work in progress, beginning to coalesce into the classic "Boys of Summer" teams of the 1950s. Gil Hodges was in the opening day lineup, but as a catcher. He would only be shifted to first base after the emergence of Roy Campanella. Jackie Robinson started the season at second base—Eddie Stanky had been traded just before the start of the season to make room for Robinson at his natural position; he had played first base during his 1947 rookie season. Pee Wee Reese was the only "Boys of summer" regular to already be ensconced at his position, shortstop. Billy Cox had been acquired from the Pittsburgh Pirates during the offseason, but as one of nine players who would see time at third for the team that year, he only played 70 games at the position. Carl Furillo was already a regular, but in center field. Duke Snider was brought up to the team in mid-season, and it was not until 1949 that Furillo moved to right field and Snider became the regular center fielder.

Preacher Roe and Ralph Branca were in the starting rotation, but Carl Erskine only appeared in a handful of games, and Don Newcombe would not join the staff until the following year.

== Offseason ==
- November 14, 1947: Stan Rojek and Ed Stevens were purchased from the Dodgers by the Pittsburgh Pirates.
- December 3, 1947: Monty Basgall was traded by the Dodgers to the Pittsburgh Pirates for Jimmy Bloodworth and Vic Barnhart.
- December 8, 1947: Dixie Walker, Hal Gregg and Vic Lombardi were traded by the Dodgers to the Pittsburgh Pirates for Preacher Roe, Billy Cox and Gene Mauch.
- March 6, 1948: Eddie Stanky was traded by the Dodgers to the Boston Braves for Bama Rowell, Ray Sanders and cash.

== Regular season ==
Future Hall of Famer Roy Campanella made his major league debut on April 20. In July, Campanella replaced Bruce Edwards as the club's starting catcher. This marked the first time that a major league team had two black players in its everyday lineup.

On August 29, Jackie Robinson completed the "reverse" or "unnatural" cycle, just the third accomplished by a National League player, and fifth in the major leagues. The most recent reverse cycle by a National League player was by Arky Vaughan on July 19, 1939, as a member of the Pittsburgh Pirates. Robinson and Vaughan were teammates this season, though not in the starting lineup together for this game.

On September 9, Rex Barney pitched a no-hitter against the New York Giants. He walked two batters and struck out four in a 2–0 victory.

=== Season standings ===
National League
Team	W	L	Pct.	GB	Home	Road
Boston Braves	91	62	.595	—	45‍–‍31	46‍–‍31
St. Louis Cardinals	85	69	.552	6½	44‍–‍33	41‍–‍36
Brooklyn Dodgers	84	70	.545	7½	36‍–‍41	48‍–‍29
Pittsburgh Pirates	83	71	.539	8½	47‍–‍31	36‍–‍40
New York Giants	78	76	.506	13½	37‍–‍40	41‍–‍36
Philadelphia Phillies	66	88	.429	25½	32‍–‍44	34‍–‍44
Cincinnati Reds	64	89	.418	27	32‍–‍45	32‍–‍44
Chicago Cubs	64	90	.416	27½	35‍–‍42	29‍–‍48

=== Record vs. opponents ===
1948 National League record Sources:
Team	BSN	BRO	CHC	CIN	NYG	PHI	PIT	STL
Boston	—	14–8	16–6–1	13–8	11–11	14–8	12–10	11–11
Brooklyn	8–14	—	11–11	18–4	11–11–1	15–7	9–13	12–10
Chicago	6–16–1	11–11	—	10–12	11–11	7–15	8–14	11–11
Cincinnati	8–13	4–18	12–10	—	10–12	11–11	9–13	10–12
New York	11–11	11–11–1	11–11	12–10	—	14–8	12–10	7–15
Philadelphia	8–14	7–15	15–7	11–11	8–14	—	12–10–1	5–17
Pittsburgh	10–12	13–9	14–8	13–9	10–12	10–12–1	—	13–9–1
St. Louis	11–11	10–12	11–11	12–10	15–7	17–5	9–13–1	—

=== Opening Day lineup ===
Opening Day lineup
Name	Position
Jackie Robinson	Second baseman
Arky Vaughan	Left fielder
Preston Ward	First baseman
Carl Furillo	Center fielder
Pee Wee Reese	Shortstop
Dick Whitman	Right fielder
Billy Cox	Third baseman
Gil Hodges	Catcher
Rex Barney	Starting pitcher

=== Notable transactions ===
- April 18, 1948: Ray Sanders was purchased from the Dodgers by the Boston Braves.
- September 29, 1948: Jimmy Bloodworth was purchased from the Dodgers by the Cincinnati Reds.

=== Roster ===
1948 Brooklyn Dodgers
Roster
Pitchers: 11 Jack Banta; 26 Rex Barney; 29 Hank Behrman; 13 Ralph Branca; 25 Hugh Casey; 17 Carl Erskine; 23,45 John Hall; 19 Joe Hatten; 20 Phil Haugstad; 16,23 Clyde King; 38 Paul Minner; 12,40 Erv Palica; 32 Willie Ramsdell; 28 Preacher Roe; 20 Elmer Sexauer; 30 Lefty Sloat; 41 Harry Taylor; 37 Johnny Van Cuyk	Catchers: 24 Bobby Bragan; 33,39,56 Roy Campanella; 10 Bruce Edwards; Infielders: 33 Tommy Brown; 3 Billy Cox; 14 Gil Hodges; 21 Spider Jorgensen; 29,44 Gene Mauch; 34 Eddie Miksis; 17 Bob Ramazzotti; 1 Pee Wee Reese; 42 Jackie Robinson; 36,52 Preston Ward	Outfielders: 6 Carl Furillo; 22 Gene Hermanski; 17,40 Don Lund; 35 Marv Rackley; 7 Pete Reiser; 8 George Shuba; 4 Duke Snider; 9 Arky Vaughan; 18 Dick Whitman	Manager: 27 Ray Blades; 2 Leo Durocher; -- Burt Shotton; Coaches: 27 Ray Blades; 31 Jake Pitler; 15 Clyde Sukeforth

== Player stats ==
=== Batting ===
==== Starters by position ====
Note: Pos = Position; G = Games played; AB = At bats; H = Hits; Avg.= Batting average; HR = Home runs; RBI = Runs batted in

Pos	Player	G	AB	H	Avg.	HR	RBI
C	Roy Campanella	83	279	72	.258	9	45
1B	Gil Hodges	134	481	120	.249	11	70
2B	Jackie Robinson	147	574	170	.296	12	85
3B	Billy Cox	88	237	59	.249	3	15
SS	Pee Wee Reese	151	566	155	.274	9	75
OF	Gene Hermanski	133	400	116	.290	15	60
OF	Carl Furillo	108	364	108	.297	4	44
OF	Marv Rackley	88	281	92	.327	0	15

==== Other batters ====
Note: G = Games played; AB = At bats; H = Hits; Avg.= Batting average; HR = Home runs; RBI = Runs batted in

Player	G	AB	H	Avg.	HR	RBI
Bruce Edwards	96	286	79	.276	8	54
Eddie Miksis	86	221	47	.213	2	16
Dick Whitman	60	165	48	.291	0	20
George Shuba	63	161	43	.267	4	32
Duke Snider	53	160	39	.244	5	21
Preston Ward	42	146	38	.260	1	21
Tommy Brown	54	145	35	.241	2	20
Pete Reiser	64	127	30	.236	1	19
Arky Vaughan	65	123	30	.244	3	22
Spider Jorgensen	31	90	27	.300	1	13
Don Lund	27	69	13	.188	1	5
Gene Mauch	12	13	2	.154	0	0
Bobby Bragan	9	12	2	.167	0	0
Bob Ramazzotti	4	3	0	.000	0	0

=== Pitching ===
==== Starting pitchers ====
Note: G = Games pitched; IP = Innings pitched; W = Wins; L = Losses; ERA = Earned run average; SO = Strikeouts

Player	G	IP	W	L	ERA	SO
Rex Barney	44	246.2	15	13	3.10	138
Ralph Branca	36	215.2	14	9	3.51	122
Harry Taylor	17	80.2	2	7	5.36	32

==== Other pitchers ====
Note: G = Games pitched; IP = Innings pitched; W = Wins; L = Losses; ERA = Earned run average; SO = Strikeouts

Player	G	IP	W	L	ERA	SO
Joe Hatten	42	208.2	13	10	3.58	73
Preacher Roe	34	177.2	12	8	2.63	86
Erv Palica	41	125.1	6	6	4.45	74
Carl Erskine	17	64.0	6	3	3.23	29
Lefty Sloat	4	7.1	0	1	6.14	1
Jack Banta	2	3.1	0	1	8.10	1

==== Relief pitchers ====
Note: G = Games pitched; W = Wins; L = Losses; SV = Saves; ERA = Earned run average; SO = Strikeouts

Player	G	W	L	SV	ERA	SO
Hank Behrman	34	5	4	7	4.05	42
Paul Minner	28	4	3	1	2.44	23
Willie Ramsdell	27	4	4	4	5.19	34
Hugh Casey	22	3	0	4	8.00	7
Clyde King	9	0	1	0	8.03	5
Johnny Van Cuyk	3	0	0	0	3.60	1
John Hall	3	0	0	0	6.23	2
Elmer Sexauer	2	0	0	0	13.50	0
Phil Haugstad	1	0	0	0	0.00	0

== Awards and honors ==
- 1948 Major League Baseball All-Star Game
  - Ralph Branca starter
  - Pee Wee Reese starter

=== League top five finishers ===
Rex Barney

- #2 in NL in strikeouts (138)
- #4 in NL in shutouts (4)

Ralph Branca

- #5 in NL in strikeouts (122)

Pee Wee Reese

- #2 in NL in stolen bases (25)

Jackie Robinson

- #4 in NL in runs scored (108)
- #4 in NL in stolen bases (22)
- #4 in NL in doubles (38)

Preacher Roe

- #4 in NL in ERA (2.63)

== Farm system ==
Level	Team	League	Manager
AAA	Montreal Royals	International League	Clay Hopper
AAA	St. Paul Saints	American Association	Walter Alston
AA	Fort Worth Cats	Texas League	Les Burge; George Dockins; Bobby Bragan
AA	Mobile Bears	Southern Association	Alfred Todd
A	Greenville Spinners	South Atlantic League	Greg Mulleavy
A	Pueblo Dodgers	Western League	John Fitzpatrick
B	Asheville Tourists	Tri-State League	Clay Bryant
B	Danville Dodgers	Illinois–Indiana–Iowa League	Paul Chervinko
B	Lancaster Red Roses	Interstate League	Dibrell Williams; Jack Knight
B	Nashua Dodgers	New England League	Al Campanis
B	Newport News Dodgers	Piedmont League	Roy Schalk
C	Abilene Blue Sox	West Texas–New Mexico League	Art Bowland; Otis Davis
C	Greenwood Dodgers	Cotton States League	Jim Bivin
C	Idaho Falls Russets	Pioneer League	Jay Kirke, Jr. Lewis Garland
C	Johnstown Johnnies	Middle Atlantic League	Roy Nichols
C	Santa Barbara Dodgers	California League	Chester Kehn
D	Trois-Rivières Royals	Canadian–American League	Ed Head
D	Cairo Dodgers	Kentucky–Illinois–Tennessee League	Hugh Holliday; Norbert Hall
D	Cambridge Dodgers	Eastern Shore League	Bob Vickery; Stew Hofferth
D	Medford Nuggets	Far West League	Larry Shepard
D	Olean Oilers	Pennsylvania–Ontario–New York League	Greg Mulleavy
D	Ponca City Dodgers	Kansas–Oklahoma–Missouri League	Boyd Bartley
D	Pulaski Counts	Appalachian League	George Pfister
D	Sheboygan Indians	Wisconsin State League	Joe Hauser
D	Valdosta Dodgers	Georgia–Florida League	Lou Rochelli
D	Zanesville Dodgers	Ohio–Indiana League	Ray Hathaway

LEAGUE CHAMPIONS: Montreal, St. Paul, Ft. Worth, Greenville, Nashua, Newport News, Santa Barbara, Pulaski, Sheboygan, Zanesville
