= 1948 Pittsburgh Pirates season =

1948 Pittsburgh Pirates
- League: National League
- Ballpark: Forbes Field
- City: Pittsburgh, Pennsylvania
- Owners: Frank E. McKinney, John W. Galbreath, Bing Crosby, Thomas P. Johnson
- General managers: Roy Hamey
- Managers: Billy Meyer
- Radio: WWSW; Rosey Rowswell, Bob Prince

The 1948 Pittsburgh Pirates season was the 67th season of the Pittsburgh Pirates franchise; the 62nd in the National League. The Pirates finished fourth in the league standings with a record of 83–71. It was the first season the Pirates sported Black and Gold as the teams official colors, matching them with the city's other professional sports teams who also use Black and Gold as their colors, which they all still use to this day.

== Offseason ==
- December 8, 1947: Billy Cox, Gene Mauch and Preacher Roe were traded by the Pirates to the Brooklyn Dodgers for Hal Gregg, Vic Lombardi and Dixie Walker.

== Regular season ==
=== Season standings ===
National League
Team	W	L	Pct.	GB	Home	Road
Boston Braves	91	62	.595	—	45‍–‍31	46‍–‍31
St. Louis Cardinals	85	69	.552	6½	44‍–‍33	41‍–‍36
Brooklyn Dodgers	84	70	.545	7½	36‍–‍41	48‍–‍29
Pittsburgh Pirates	83	71	.539	8½	47‍–‍31	36‍–‍40
New York Giants	78	76	.506	13½	37‍–‍40	41‍–‍36
Philadelphia Phillies	66	88	.429	25½	32‍–‍44	34‍–‍44
Cincinnati Reds	64	89	.418	27	32‍–‍45	32‍–‍44
Chicago Cubs	64	90	.416	27½	35‍–‍42	29‍–‍48

=== Record vs. opponents ===
1948 National League record Sources:
Team	BSN	BRO	CHC	CIN	NYG	PHI	PIT	STL
Boston	—	14–8	16–6–1	13–8	11–11	14–8	12–10	11–11
Brooklyn	8–14	—	11–11	18–4	11–11–1	15–7	9–13	12–10
Chicago	6–16–1	11–11	—	10–12	11–11	7–15	8–14	11–11
Cincinnati	8–13	4–18	12–10	—	10–12	11–11	9–13	10–12
New York	11–11	11–11–1	11–11	12–10	—	14–8	12–10	7–15
Philadelphia	8–14	7–15	15–7	11–11	8–14	—	12–10–1	5–17
Pittsburgh	10–12	13–9	14–8	13–9	10–12	10–12–1	—	13–9–1
St. Louis	11–11	10–12	11–11	12–10	15–7	17–5	9–13–1	—

=== Game log ===
1948 Game Log: 83–71 (Home: 47–31; Away: 36–40)
April: 6–4 (Home: 2–1; Away: 4–3)

#	Date	Opponent	Score	Win	Loss	Save	Attendance	Record
1	April 19	@ Reds	1–4	Blackwell	**Gregg** (0–1)	—	32,147	0–1
2	April 20	Cubs	3–2	**Sewell** (1–0)	Meyer	—	38,546	1–1
3	April 21	Cubs	3–6	Borowy	**Bonham** (0–1)	Chipman	5,555	1–2
4	April 22	Cubs	3–0	**Riddle** (1–0)	Rush	—	38,546	2–2
5	April 23	@ Reds	3–5	Blackwell	**Higbe** (0–1)	Gumbert	5,355	2–3
6	April 24	@ Reds	7–1	**Singleton** (1–0)	Hughes	—	10,385	3–3
7	April 25	@ Reds	6–7	Gumbert	**Lombardi** (0–1)	—		3–4
8	April 25	@ Reds	13–10	**Walsh** (1–0)	Hetki	—	28,086	4–4
9	April 29	@ Cubs	4–2	**Riddle** (2–0)	Borowy	—	6,637	5–4
10	April 30	@ Cubs	10–4	**Sewell** (2–0)	Rush	**Higbe** (1)	13,058	6–4

May: 14–12 (Home: 9–4; Away: 5–8)

#	Date	Opponent	Score	Win	Loss	Save	Attendance	Record
11	May 1	Reds	7–2	**Ostermueller** (1–0)	Hughes	—	13,661	7–4
12	May 2	Reds	6–4	**Queen** (1–0)	Blackwell	**Lombardi** (1)	35,779	8–4
13	May 5	Braves	3–2	**Higbe** (1–1)	Sain	—	5,210	9–4
14	May 6	Giants	2–9	Poat	**Bonham** (0–2)	—	14,542	9–5
15	May 8	Giants	5–12	Jansen	**Lombardi** (0–2)	Trinkle	11,535	9–6
16	May 9	Dodgers	2–14	Branca	**Singleton** (1–1)	—		9–7
17	May 9	Dodgers	10–8	**Sewell** (3–0)	Ramsdell	—	40,797	10–7
18	May 10	Dodgers	4–2	**Riddle** (3–0)	Palica	—	11,355	11–7
19	May 12	Phillies	0–5	Donnelly	**Bonham** (0–3)	—	11,664	11–8
20	May 13	Phillies	5–1	**Chesnes** (1–0)	Leonard	**Singleton** (1)	29,789	12–8
21	May 14	@ Cardinals	1–2	Pollet	**Ostermueller** (1–1)	—	14,839	12–9
22	May 15	@ Cardinals	3–8	Brecheen	**Riddle** (3–1)	—	10,086	12–10
23	May 16	@ Cardinals	5–6 (10)	Pollet	**Gregg** (0–2)	—	20,484	12–11
24	May 18	@ Braves	4–3	**Lombardi** (1–2)	Voiselle	—	19,181	13–11
25	May 19	@ Braves	1–4	Bickford	**Sewell** (3–1)	—	15,978	13–12
26	May 20	@ Braves	13–0	**Riddle** (4–1)	Barrett	—	3,089	14–12
27	May 21	@ Dodgers	8–4	**Ostermueller** (2–1)	Barney	**Gregg** (1)	8,803	15–12
28	May 22	@ Dodgers	3–1	**Higbe** (2–1)	Branca	—	12,821	16–12
29	May 23	@ Giants	1–2	Jansen	**Singleton** (1–2)	—	36,473	16–13
30	May 25	@ Phillies	1–4	Erickson	**Riddle** (4–2)	Rowe	7,138	16–14
31	May 27	@ Phillies	1–2	Simmons	**Higbe** (2–2)	—	13,839	16–15
32	May 28	Cardinals	1–1 (6)			—	24,029	16–15
33	May 29	Cardinals	7–3	**Chesnes** (2–0)	Munger	—	15,336	17–15
34	May 30	Cardinals	9–3	**Higbe** (3–2)	Pollet	—		18–15
35	May 30	Cardinals	7–6	**Lombardi** (2–2)	Staley	—	33,584	19–15
36	May 31	@ Cubs	3–4	Rush	**Higbe** (3–3)	—		19–16
37	May 31	@ Cubs	4–2	**Riddle** (5–2)	Chambers	—	46,965	20–16

June: 13–13 (Home: 6–6; Away: 7–7)

#	Date	Opponent	Score	Win	Loss	Save	Attendance	Record
38	June 2	Braves	1–5	Sain	**Lombardi** (2–3)	—	25,710	20–17
39	June 3	Braves	5–3	**Higbe** (4–3)	Voiselle	**Singleton** (2)	9,767	21–17
40	June 4	Braves	7–10	Hogue	**Gregg** (0–3)	Voiselle	37,355	21–18
41	June 5	Braves	8–7	**Lombardi** (3–3)	Bickford	—	11,397	22–18
42	June 6	Giants	4–16	Poat	**Singleton** (1–3)	—		22–19
43	June 6	Giants	4–3	**Riddle** (6–2)	Trinkle	—	36,496	23–19
44	June 7	Giants	5–9	Jones	**Singleton** (1–4)	—	23,243	23–20
45	June 9	Dodgers	6–4	**Sewell** (4–1)	Barney	**Higbe** (2)	11,790	24–20
46	June 10	Dodgers	4–1	**Bonham** (1–3)	Taylor	—	30,344	25–20
47	June 11	Dodgers	2–3 (13)	Branca	**Lombardi** (3–4)	Ramsdell	10,233	25–21
48	June 13	Phillies	7–8	Dubiel	**Higbe** (4–4)	Heintzelman		25–22
49	June 13	Phillies	9–2	**Riddle** (7–2)	Rowe	—	30,385	26–22
50	June 15	@ Giants	2–0	**Ostermueller** (3–1)	Hartung	—	44,150	27–22
51	June 16	@ Giants	11–5	**Bonham** (2–3)	Konikowski	—	8,160	28–22
52	June 17	@ Giants	9–8	**Singleton** (2–4)	Jansen	**Higbe** (3)	13,556	29–22
53	June 18	@ Phillies	2–0	**Riddle** (8–2)	Roberts	—	13,501	30–22
54	June 19	@ Phillies	7–6	**Chesnes** (3–0)	Dubiel	**Higbe** (4)	7,555	31–22
55	June 20	@ Phillies	0–9	Leonard	**Sewell** (4–2)	—		31–23
56	June 20	@ Phillies	7–5	**Gregg** (1–3)	Donnelly	**Queen** (1)	23,810	32–23
57	June 21	@ Dodgers	2–5	Branca	**Lombardi** (3–5)	—	28,404	32–24
58	June 24	@ Dodgers	2–6	Ramsdell	**Chesnes** (3–1)	—		32–25
59	June 24	@ Dodgers	6–8 (8)	Barney	**Riddle** (8–3)	Roe	24,745	32–26
60	June 25	@ Braves	3–12	Spahn	**Ostermueller** (3–2)	—	25,587	32–27
61	June 26	@ Braves	7–1	**Bonham** (3–3)	Voiselle	—	31,490	33–27
62	June 27	@ Braves	1–9	Sain	**Lombardi** (3–6)	—	17,648	33–28
63	June 29	@ Reds	5–6 (14)	Raffensberger	**Singleton** (2–5)	—	23,233	33–29

July: 13–16 (Home: 8–10; Away: 5–6)

#	Date	Opponent	Score	Win	Loss	Save	Attendance	Record
64	July 1	@ Reds	5–2	**Ostermueller** (4–2)	Wehmeier	—	5,493	34–29
65	July 2	Cubs	1–5	Meyer	**Chesnes** (3–2)	—	30,041	34–30
66	July 4	Cubs	5–1	**Sewell** (5–2)	Borowy	**Higbe** (5)		35–30
67	July 4	Cubs	6–2	**Riddle** (9–3)	Rush	—	26,183	36–30
68	July 5	Reds	10–3	**Lombardi** (4–6)	Fox	—		37–30
69	July 5	Reds	4–6	Gumbert	**Bonham** (3–4)	Fox	32,029	37–31
70	July 6	Reds	4–6	Vander Meer	**Queen** (1–1)	Gumbert	31,035	37–32
71	July 7	@ Cardinals	2–1	**Chesnes** (4–2)	Brazle	—	14,255	38–32
72	July 8	@ Cardinals	6–4	**Ostermueller** (5–2)	Staley	**Higbe** (6)	15,035	39–32
73	July 9	@ Cubs	1–2	Hamner	**Riddle** (9–4)	—	14,506	39–33
74	July 10	@ Cubs	2–4	Schmitz	**Sewell** (5–3)	—	19,873	39–34
75	July 11	@ Cubs	0–1	Meyer	**Bonham** (3–5)	—	29,683	39–35
76	July 15	Giants	4–3	**Queen** (2–1)	Hartung	—		40–35
77	July 15	Giants	3–10	Poat	**Riddle** (9–5)	—	26,050	40–36
78	July 17	Giants	5–6	Konikowski	**Higbe** (4–5)	—	16,071	40–37
79	July 18	Braves	2–10	Potter	**Riddle** (9–6)	—		40–38
80	July 18	Braves	1–3	Bickford	**Bonham** (3–6)	—	34,116	40–39
81	July 19	Braves	1–0	**Ostermueller** (6–2)	Sain	—	28,115	41–39
82	July 20	Phillies	11–2	**Chesnes** (5–2)	Simmons	—	26,019	42–39
83	July 21	Phillies	2–3 (10)	Rowe	**Singleton** (2–6)	—	6,797	42–40
84	July 22	Phillies	5–3	**Sewell** (6–3)	Bicknell	—		43–40
85	July 22	Phillies	1–1 (5)			—	14,107	43–40
86	July 23	Dodgers	3–4	Palica	**Queen** (2–2)	Behrman	33,702	43–41
87	July 25	Dodgers	6–7	Erskine	**Chesnes** (5–3)	Palica		43–42
88	July 25	Dodgers	7–4 (8)	**Singleton** (3–6)	Barney	—	39,204	44–42
89	July 27	@ Braves	1–5	Potter	**Ostermueller** (6–3)	—	29,031	44–43
90	July 28	@ Braves	2–8	Bickford	**Riddle** (9–7)	—	25,446	44–44
91	July 29	@ Braves	1–2	Voiselle	**Queen** (2–3)	—	12,813	44–45
92	July 30	@ Dodgers	10–5	**Chesnes** (6–3)	Branca	—	31,278	45–45
93	July 31	@ Dodgers	5–2	**Higbe** (5–5)	Behrman	**Lombardi** (2)	15,633	46–45

August: 20–9 (Home: 15–5; Away: 5–4)

#	Date	Opponent	Score	Win	Loss	Save	Attendance	Record
94	August 6	@ Giants	6–7	Poat	**Ostermueller** (6–4)	Jones	6,544	46–46
95	August 7	@ Giants	5–4 (11)	**Higbe** (6–5)	Poat	—	20,408	47–46
96	August 8	@ Giants	2–6	Jansen	**Riddle** (9–8)	Jones		47–47
97	August 8	@ Giants	5–4	**Chesnes** (7–3)	Konikowski	—	46,214	48–47
98	August 10	Cubs	5–1	**Gregg** (2–3)	Rush	—	21,256	49–47
99	August 11	Cubs	4–2	**Sewell** (7–3)	Hamner	—	4,652	50–47
100	August 12	Cardinals	3–2	**Lombardi** (5–6)	Dickson	—	26,004	51–47
101	August 13	Cardinals	5–4	**Chesnes** (8–3)	Wilks	—	34,893	52–47
102	August 14	Cardinals	3–6	Brecheen	**Ostermueller** (6–5)	—	22,283	52–48
103	August 15	Cardinals	3–8	Wilks	**Higbe** (6–6)	—		52–49
104	August 15	Cardinals	5–4	**Bonham** (4–6)	Dickson	—	37,767	53–49
105	August 16	Reds	2–5	Vander Meer	**Gregg** (2–4)	—	19,230	53–50
106	August 17	Reds	4–3	**Lombardi** (6–6)	Blackwell	—	25,929	54–50
107	August 18	@ Cubs	7–4	**Chesnes** (9–3)	Meyer	**Higbe** (7)	13,317	55–50
108	August 19	@ Cubs	2–1	**Sewell** (8–3)	Lade	—	10,853	56–50
109	August 20	@ Cardinals	4–7	Staley	**Ostermueller** (6–6)	Brazle	21,580	56–51
110	August 21	@ Cardinals	2–9	Munger	**Bonham** (4–7)	—	22,387	56–52
111	August 22	@ Cardinals	4–1 (10)	**Riddle** (10–8)	Dickson	**Lombardi** (3)	18,578	57–52
112	August 24	Dodgers	9–1	**Chesnes** (10–3)	Erskine	—	38,265	58–52
113	August 25	Dodgers	12–11	**Main** (1–0)	Erskine	—	17,048	59–52
114	August 26	Phillies	11–4	**Sewell** (9–3)	Heintzelman	**Higbe** (8)		60–52
115	August 26	Phillies	4–1	**Queen** (3–3)	Leonard	**Higbe** (9)	10,387	61–52
116	August 27	Phillies	4–3	**Higbe** (7–6)	Leonard	—	32,367	62–52
117	August 28	Phillies	2–9	Rowe	**Ostermueller** (6–7)	—		62–53
118	August 28	Phillies	7–11	Leonard	**Bonham** (4–8)	—	14,286	62–54
119	August 29	Braves	6–1	**Chesnes** (11–3)	Spahn	—		63–54
120	August 29	Braves	5–2	**Lombardi** (7–6)	Voiselle	—	30,276	64–54
121	August 30	Braves	2–1	**Ostermueller** (7–7)	Sain	—	33,174	65–54
122	August 31	Giants	5–4	**Riddle** (11–8)	Poat	**Higbe** (10)	30,386	66–54

September: 16–16 (Home: 7–5; Away: 9–11)

#	Date	Opponent	Score	Win	Loss	Save	Attendance	Record
123	September 1	Giants	1–3	Kennedy	**Bonham** (4–9)	—	33,946	66–55
124	September 2	Giants	4–5	Jansen	**Chesnes** (11–4)	—	16,250	66–56
125	September 3	Cubs	1–10	Meyer	**Queen** (3–4)	—	27,843	66–57
126	September 5	Cubs	7–3	**Sewell** (10–3)	Borowy	—		67–57
127	September 5	Cubs	3–11	Lade	**Riddle** (11–9)	—	25,569	67–58
128	September 6	Cardinals	2–1	**Chesnes** (12–4)	Dickson	—		68–58
129	September 6	Cardinals	4–1	**Lombardi** (8–6)	Munger	—		69–58
130	September 7	Cardinals	6–2	**Ostermueller** (8–7)	Hearn	—	36,136	70–58
131	September 8	@ Reds	5–1	**Bonham** (5–9)	Fox	—	12,436	71–58
132	September 9	@ Reds	6–1	**Riddle** (12–9)	Walters	—	2,002	72–58
133	September 11	@ Cubs	13–12	**Queen** (4–4)	Chambers	**Riddle** (1)	17,095	73–58
134	September 12	@ Cubs	7–3	**Sewell** (11–3)	McCall	—	27,967	74–58
135	September 13	@ Giants	2–5	Kennedy	**Lombardi** (8–7)	—	33,372	74–59
136	September 14	@ Dodgers	5–8	Behrman	**Ostermueller** (8–8)	—		74–60
137	September 14	@ Dodgers	3–7	Taylor	**Riddle** (12–10)	—		74–61
138	September 15	@ Giants	8–3	**Bonham** (6–9)	Jansen	—	9,180	75–61
139	September 16	@ Giants	10–6	**Chesnes** (13–4)	Koslo	—	7,174	76–61
140	September 17	@ Braves	2–6	Sain	**Lombardi** (8–8)	—	11,838	76–62
141	September 18	@ Braves	1–2	Spahn	**Ostermueller** (8–9)	—	21,085	76–63
142	September 19	@ Phillies	6–9	Leonard	**Main** (1–1)	—		76–64
143	September 19	@ Phillies	3–5	Rowe	**Higbe** (7–7)	—	15,713	76–65
144	September 20	@ Phillies	2–5	Roberts	**Chesnes** (13–5)	—	2,884	76–66
145	September 20	@ Phillies	4–7	Possehl	**Bonham** (6–10)	—	3,513	76–67
146	September 21	@ Dodgers	6–3	**Lombardi** (9–8)	Barney	—	10,882	77–67
147	September 22	@ Dodgers	5–1	**Sewell** (12–3)	Taylor	—	3,756	78–67
148	September 24	Reds	3–4	Wehmeier	**Ostermueller** (8–10)	Gumbert	18,914	78–68
149	September 25	Reds	16–6	**Chesnes** (14–5)	Blackburn	—	7,766	79–68
150	September 26	Reds	8–6	**Sewell** (13–3)	Gumbert	**Lombardi** (4)		80–68
151	September 26	Reds	8–5 (8)	**Singleton** (4–6)	Peterson	—	26,483	81–68
152	September 29	@ Cardinals	2–1	**Lombardi** (10–8)	Dickson	—	5,977	82–68
153	September 30	@ Cardinals	1–6	Munger	**Chesnes** (14–6)	—	2,060	82–69
154	September 30	@ Cardinals	1–4	Brecheen	**Ostermueller** (8–11)	—	8,597	82–70

October: 1–1 (Home: 0–0; Away: 1–1)

#	Date	Opponent	Score	Win	Loss	Save	Attendance	Record
155	October 1	@ Reds	2–1	**Higbe** (8–7)	Cress	—	1,162	83–70
156	October 3	@ Reds	0–1	Vander Meer	**Lombardi** (10–9)	—	7,255	83–71

Legend: = Win = Loss = Tie
Bold = Pirates team member

=== Roster ===
1948 Pittsburgh Pirates
**Roster**
**Pitchers**: 35 Tiny Bonham; 24 Bob Chesnes; 32 Hal Gregg; 13 Kirby Higbe; 28 Vic Lombardi; 36 Woody Main; 38 Cal McLish; 21 Fritz Ostermueller; 23 Mel Queen; 37 Elmer Riddle; 30 Rip Sewell; 26 Elmer Singleton; 22 Nick Strincevich; 34 Junior Walsh	**Catchers**: 9 Ed Fitz Gerald; 10 Clyde Kluttz; 3 Johnny Riddle; 31 Earl Turner; **Infielders**: 8 Monty Basgall; 18 Eddie Bockman; -- Pete Castiglione; 16 Frankie Gustine; 7 Danny Murtaugh; 6 Stan Rojek; 5 Ed Stevens; 14 Max West; 17 Grady Wilson	**Outfielders**: 17 Ted Beard; 12 Johnny Hopp; 4 Ralph Kiner; 11 Dixie Walker; 15 Wally Westlake; **Other batters**: 29 Don Gutteridge	**Manager**: 1 Billy Meyer; **Coaches**: 2 Bill Burwell; 19 Goldie Holt; 3 Johnny Riddle; 30 Rip Sewell; 33 Honus Wagner

== Player stats ==
=== Batting ===
==== Starters by position ====
Note: Pos = Position; G = Games played; AB = At bats; H = Hits; Avg. = Batting average; HR = Home runs; RBI = Runs batted in

Pos	Player	G	AB	H	Avg.	HR	RBI
C	Clyde Kluttz	94	271	60	.221	4	20
1B	Ed Stevens	128	429	109	.254	10	69
2B	Danny Murtaugh	146	514	149	.290	1	71
SS	Stan Rojek	156	641	186	.290	4	51
3B	Frankie Gustine	131	449	120	.267	9	42
OF	Dixie Walker	129	408	129	.316	2	54
OF	Ralph Kiner	156	555	147	.265	40	123
OF	Wally Westlake	132	428	122	.285	17	65

==== Other batters ====
Note: G = Games played; AB = At bats; H = Hits; Avg. = Batting average; HR = Home runs; RBI = Runs batted in

Pos	Player	G	AB	H	Avg.	HR	RBI
UT	Johnny Hopp	120	392	109	.278	1	31
C	Ed Fitz Gerald	102	262	70	.267	1	35
3B	Eddie Bockman	70	176	42	.239	4	23
1B	Max West	87	146	26	.178	8	21
OF	Ted Beard	25	81	16	.198	0	7
2B	Monty Basgall	38	51	11	.216	2	6
C	Johnny Riddle	10	15	3	.200	0	0
SS	Grady Wilson	12	10	1	.100	0	1
PH	Don Gutteridge	4	2	0	.000	0	0
SS	Pete Castiglione	4	2	0	.000	0	0
C	Earl Turner	2	1	0	.000	0	0

=== Pitching ===
==== Starting pitchers ====
Note: G = Games pitched; IP = Innings pitched; W = Wins; L = Losses; ERA = Earned run average; SO = Strikeouts

Player	G	IP	W	L	ERA	SO
Bob Chesnes	25	194.1	14	6	3.57	69
Elmer Riddle	28	191.0	12	10	3.49	63
Tiny Bonham	22	135.2	6	10	4.31	42
Fritz Ostermueller	23	134.1	8	11	4.42	43
Rip Sewell	21	121.2	13	3	3.48	36

==== Other pitchers ====
Note: G = Games pitched; IP = Innings pitched; W = Wins; L = Losses; ERA = Earned run average; SO = Strikeouts

Player	G	IP	W	L	ERA	SO
Vic Lombardi	38	163.0	10	9	3.70	54
Kirby Higbe	56	158.0	8	7	3.36	86
Elmer Singleton	38	92.1	4	6	4.97	53
Hal Gregg	22	74.1	2	4	4.60	25
Mel Queen	25	66.1	4	4	6.65	34
Cal McLish	2	5.0	0	0	9.00	1

==== Relief pitchers ====
Note: G = Games pitched; W = Wins; L = Losses; SV = Saves; ERA = Earned run average; SO = Strikeouts

Player	G	W	L	SV	ERA	SO
Woody Main	17	1	1	0	8.33	12
Nick Strincevich	3	0	0	0	8.31	1
Junior Walsh	2	1	0	0	10.38	0

== Farm system ==
Level	Team	League	Manager
AAA	Indianapolis Indians	American Association	Al López
AA	New Orleans Pelicans	Southern Association	Jimmy Brown
A	Fort Wayne Generals	Central League	Boom-Boom Beck
A	Albany Senators	Eastern League	Pinky May
B	Waco Pirates	Big State League	Buster Chatham
B	Davenport Pirates	Illinois–Indiana–Iowa League	Ival Goodman
B	York White Roses	Interstate League	Frank Oceak
B	Anderson Rebels	Tri-State League	Bob Richards
C	Keokuk Pirates	Central Association	Phil Seghi
C	Uniontown Coal Barons	Middle Atlantic League	Bill Mongiello
C	Fargo-Moorhead Twins	Northern League	Bruno Haas and Ralph DiLullo
D	Greenville Pirates	Alabama State League	Walt Tauscher
D	Rehoboth Beach Pirates	Eastern Shore League	Doug Peden
D	New Iberia Pelicans	Evangeline League	George Stumpf
D	Santa Rosa Pirates	Far West League	Dan Reagan
D	Leesburg Pirates	Florida State League	Edgar Leip
D	Tallahassee Pirates	Georgia–Florida League	Jack Rothrock
D	Bartlesville Oilers	Kansas–Oklahoma–Missouri League	Eddie Marleau
D	Salisbury Pirates	North Carolina State League	Art Doll

LEAGUE CHAMPIONS: Santa Rosa
