= 1948 Cincinnati Reds season =

1948 Cincinnati Reds
- League: National League
- Ballpark: Crosley Field
- City: Cincinnati
- Owners: Powel Crosley Jr.
- General managers: Warren Giles
- Managers: Johnny Neun, Bucky Walters
- Television: WLWT (Waite Hoyt)
- Radio: WCPO (Waite Hoyt)

The 1948 Cincinnati Reds season was a season in American baseball. The team finished seventh in the National League with a record of 64–89, 27 games behind the Boston Braves. This season was the first wherein the Reds were broadcast on television all over Cincinnati via WLWT, with a television simulcast of the radio commentary from WCPO with Waite Hoyt in the booth.

== Offseason ==
- Prior to 1948 season (exact date unknown)
  - Hobie Landrith was signed as an amateur free agent by the Reds.
  - Bob Nieman was signed as an amateur free agent by the Reds.

== Regular season ==
=== Season standings ===
National League
Team	W	L	Pct.	GB	Home	Road
Boston Braves	91	62	.595	—	45‍–‍31	46‍–‍31
St. Louis Cardinals	85	69	.552	6½	44‍–‍33	41‍–‍36
Brooklyn Dodgers	84	70	.545	7½	36‍–‍41	48‍–‍29
Pittsburgh Pirates	83	71	.539	8½	47‍–‍31	36‍–‍40
New York Giants	78	76	.506	13½	37‍–‍40	41‍–‍36
Philadelphia Phillies	66	88	.429	25½	32‍–‍44	34‍–‍44
Cincinnati Reds	64	89	.418	27	32‍–‍45	32‍–‍44
Chicago Cubs	64	90	.416	27½	35‍–‍42	29‍–‍48

=== Record vs. opponents ===
1948 National League record Sources:
Team	BSN	BRO	CHC	CIN	NYG	PHI	PIT	STL
Boston	—	14–8	16–6–1	13–8	11–11	14–8	12–10	11–11
Brooklyn	8–14	—	11–11	18–4	11–11–1	15–7	9–13	12–10
Chicago	6–16–1	11–11	—	10–12	11–11	7–15	8–14	11–11
Cincinnati	8–13	4–18	12–10	—	10–12	11–11	9–13	10–12
New York	11–11	11–11–1	11–11	12–10	—	14–8	12–10	7–15
Philadelphia	8–14	7–15	15–7	11–11	8–14	—	12–10–1	5–17
Pittsburgh	10–12	13–9	14–8	13–9	10–12	10–12–1	—	13–9–1
St. Louis	11–11	10–12	11–11	12–10	15–7	17–5	9–13–1	—

=== Notable transactions ===
- September 29, 1948: The Reds traded a player to be named later and cash to the Brooklyn Dodgers for Jimmy Bloodworth. The Reds completed the deal by sending Kermit Wahl to the Dodgers before the 1949 season.

=== Roster ===
1948 Cincinnati Reds
Roster
Pitchers: 44 Jim Blackburn; 47 Ewell Blackwell; 48 Ken Burkhart; 32,44 Walker Cress; 34 Eddie Erautt; 43 Howie Fox; 41 Harry Gumbert; 40 Johnny Hetki; 48 Ken Holcombe; 32,44 Tommy Hughes; 37 Buddy Lively; 38 Kent Peterson; 36 Ken Raffensberger; 33 Johnny Vander Meer; 31 Bucky Walters; 45 Herm Wehmeier	Catchers: 5 Ray Lamanno; 7 Ray Mueller; 8,11 Dewey Williams; Infielders: 12 Bobby Adams; 14 Claude Corbitt; 15 Grady Hatton; 18,20 Ted Kluszewski; 19 Howie Schultz; 10 Virgil Stallcup; 17 Babe Young; 16 Benny Zientara	Outfielders: 21 Frank Baumholtz; 37 Steve Filipowicz; 23 Augie Galan; 28 Danny Litwhiler; 29,45 Hank Sauer; 25 Clyde Vollmer; 22,27 Johnny Wyrostek; Other batters: 6 Hugh Poland; 18,28 Marv Rickert	Manager: 1 Johnny Neun; 31 Bucky Walters; Coaches: 2 George Kelly; 3 Phil Page

== Player stats ==
=== Batting ===
==== Starters by position ====
Note: Pos = Position; G = Games played; AB = At bats; H = Hits; Avg. = Batting average; HR = Home runs; RBI = Runs batted in

Pos	Player	G	AB	H	Avg.	HR	RBI
C	Ray Lamanno	127	385	93	.242	0	27
1B	Ted Kluszewski	113	379	104	.274	12	57
2B	Bobby Adams	87	262	78	.298	1	21
SS	Virgil Stallcup	149	539	123	.228	3	65
3B	Grady Hatton	133	458	110	.240	9	44
OF	Frank Baumholtz	128	415	123	.296	4	30
OF	Johnny Wyrostek	136	512	140	.273	17	76
OF	Hank Sauer	145	530	138	.260	35	97

==== Other batters ====
Note: G = Games played; AB = At bats; H = Hits; Avg. = Batting average; HR = Home runs; RBI = Runs batted in

Player	G	AB	H	Avg.	HR	RBI
Danny Litwhiler	106	338	93	.275	14	44
Claude Corbitt	87	258	66	.256	0	18
Benny Zientara	74	187	35	.187	0	7
Babe Young	49	130	30	.231	1	12
Dewey Williams	48	95	16	.168	1	5
Augie Galan	54	77	22	.286	2	16
Howie Schultz	36	72	12	.167	2	9
Ray Mueller	14	34	7	.206	0	2
Steve Filipowicz	7	26	9	.346	0	3
Clyde Vollmer	7	9	1	.111	0	0
Marv Rickert	8	6	1	.167	0	0
Hugh Poland	3	3	1	.333	0	0

=== Pitching ===
==== Starting pitchers ====
Note: G = Games pitched; IP = Innings pitched; W = Wins; L = Losses; ERA = Earned run average; SO = Strikeouts

Player	G	IP	W	L	ERA	SO
Johnny Vander Meer	33	232.0	17	14	3.41	120
Howie Fox	34	171.0	6	9	4.53	63
Herm Wehmeier	33	147.1	11	8	5.86	56
Ewell Blackwell	22	138.2	7	9	4.54	114
Bucky Walters	7	35.0	0	3	4.63	19

==== Other pitchers ====
Note: G = Games pitched; IP = Innings pitched; W = Wins; L = Losses; ERA = Earned run average; SO = Strikeouts

Player	G	IP	W	L	ERA	SO
Ken Raffensberger	40	180.1	11	12	3.84	57
Kent Peterson	43	137.0	2	15	4.60	64
Tommy Hughes	12	27.0	0	4	9.00	7

==== Relief pitchers ====
Note: G = Games pitched; W = Wins; L = Losses; SV = Saves; ERA = Earned run average; SO = Strikeouts

Player	G	W	L	SV	ERA	SO
Harry Gumbert	61	10	8	17	3.47	25
Walker Cress	30	0	1	0	4.50	33
Ken Burkhart	16	0	3	0	6.91	14
Jim Blackburn	16	0	2	0	4.18	10
Buddy Lively	10	0	0	0	2.38	12
Johnny Hetki	3	0	1	0	9.45	3
Eddie Erautt	2	0	0	0	6.00	0
Ken Holcombe	2	0	0	0	7.71	2

== Farm system ==
Level	Team	League	Manager
AAA	Syracuse Chiefs	International League	Jewel Ens
AA	Tulsa Oilers	Texas League	Al Vincent
A	Columbia Reds	Sally League	Gee Walker
B	Sunbury Reds	Interstate League	Joe Buzas
C	Rockford Rox	Central Association	Cyril Pfeifer and Paul O'Dea
C	Tyler Trojans	Lone Star League	Hack Miller
C	Ogden Reds	Pioneer League	Pip Koehler and Bobby Mattick
D	Ballinger Cats	Longhorn League	Bill Atwood
D	Muncie Reds	Ohio–Indiana League	Mike Blazo
D	Lockport Reds	PONY League	Cecil Scheffel

LEAGUE CHAMPIONS: Lockport
