= 1948 Chicago Cubs season =

1948 Chicago Cubs
- League: National League
- Ballpark: Wrigley Field
- City: Chicago
- Record: 64–90 (.416)
- League place: 8th
- Owners: Philip K. Wrigley
- General managers: James T. Gallagher
- Managers: Charlie Grimm
- Television: WGN-TV (Jack Brickhouse, Marty Hogan); WBKB (Joe Wilson)
- Radio: WIND (Bert Wilson)

The 1948 Chicago Cubs season was the 77th season of the Chicago Cubs franchise, the 73rd in the National League and the 33rd at Wrigley Field, as well as the first of many seasons to be broadcast on television on WGN-TV while keeping its separate WBKB telecasts. The Cubs finished eighth and last in the National League with a record of 64–90.

== Offseason ==
- October 9, 1947: Randy Jackson was signed as an amateur free agent by the Cubs.
- December 6, 1947: Don Elston was signed as an amateur free agent by the Cubs.
- Prior to 1948 season (exact date unknown):
  - Jim Pearce was released by the Cubs.
  - Carl Sawatski was acquired by the Cubs from the Boston Braves.

== Regular season ==
=== Season standings ===
National League
Team	W	L	Pct.	GB	Home	Road
Boston Braves	91	62	.595	—	45‍–‍31	46‍–‍31
St. Louis Cardinals	85	69	.552	6½	44‍–‍33	41‍–‍36
Brooklyn Dodgers	84	70	.545	7½	36‍–‍41	48‍–‍29
Pittsburgh Pirates	83	71	.539	8½	47‍–‍31	36‍–‍40
New York Giants	78	76	.506	13½	37‍–‍40	41‍–‍36
Philadelphia Phillies	66	88	.429	25½	32‍–‍44	34‍–‍44
Cincinnati Reds	64	89	.418	27	32‍–‍45	32‍–‍44
Chicago Cubs	64	90	.416	27½	35‍–‍42	29‍–‍48

=== Record vs. opponents ===
1948 National League record Sources:
Team	BSN	BRO	CHC	CIN	NYG	PHI	PIT	STL
Boston	—	14–8	16–6–1	13–8	11–11	14–8	12–10	11–11
Brooklyn	8–14	—	11–11	18–4	11–11–1	15–7	9–13	12–10
Chicago	6–16–1	11–11	—	10–12	11–11	7–15	8–14	11–11
Cincinnati	8–13	4–18	12–10	—	10–12	11–11	9–13	10–12
New York	11–11	11–11–1	11–11	12–10	—	14–8	12–10	7–15
Philadelphia	8–14	7–15	15–7	11–11	8–14	—	12–10–1	5–17
Pittsburgh	10–12	13–9	14–8	13–9	10–12	10–12–1	—	13–9–1
St. Louis	11–11	10–12	11–11	12–10	15–7	17–5	9–13–1	—

=== Notable transactions ===
- September 1948: Warren Hacker was acquired by the Cubs from the Shreveport Sports.

=== Roster ===
1948 Chicago Cubs
Roster
Pitchers: 26 Hank Borowy; 16 Don Carlsen; 32 Cliff Chambers; 31 Bob Chipman; 17 Jess Dobernic; 37 Paul Erickson; 17 Warren Hacker; 35 Ralph Hamner; 2 Tony Jacobs; 29 Emil Kush; 23 Doyle Lade; 27 Dutch McCall; 28 Russ Meyer; 30 Bob Rush; 53 Johnny Schmitz; 24 Ben Wade	Catchers: 9 Clyde McCullough; 10 Bob Scheffing; 8 Rube Walker; Infielders: 44 Phil Cavarretta; 6,18 Jeff Cross; 7 Dick Culler; 20 Don Johnson; 20 Danny Lynch; 33 Gene Mauch; 48 Andy Pafko; 5 Hank Schenz; 39 Roy Smalley Jr.; 7 Emil Verban; 36 Eddie Waitkus	Outfielders: 11 Cliff Aberson; 19 Hal Jeffcoat; 47 Peanuts Lowrey; 22 Clarence Maddern; 41 Carmen Mauro; 43 Bill Nicholson; Other batters: 18 Carl Sawatski	Manager: 40 Charlie Grimm; Coaches: 42 Roy Johnson; 45 Billy Jurges; 11 Merv Shea; 52 Red Smith; 41 Milt Stock

== Player stats ==
=== Batting ===
==== Starters by position ====
Note: Pos = Position; G = Games played; AB = At bats; H = Hits; Avg. = Batting average; HR = Home runs; RBI = Runs batted in

Pos	Player	G	AB	H	Avg.	HR	RBI
C	Bob Scheffing	102	293	88	.300	5	45
1B	Eddie Waitkus	139	562	166	.295	7	44
2B	Hank Schenz	96	337	88	.261	1	14
SS	Roy Smalley Jr.	124	361	78	.216	4	36
3B	Andy Pafko	142	548	171	.312	26	101
OF	Peanuts Lowrey	129	435	128	.294	2	54
OF	Hal Jeffcoat	134	473	132	.279	4	42
OF	Bill Nicholson	143	494	129	.261	19	67

==== Other batters ====
Note: G = Games played; AB = At bats; H = Hits; Avg. = Batting average; HR = Home runs; RBI = Runs batted in

Player	G	AB	H	Avg.	HR	RBI
Phil Cavarretta	111	334	93	.278	3	40
Emil Verban	56	248	73	.294	1	16
Clarence Maddern	80	214	54	.252	4	27
Clyde McCullough	69	172	36	.209	1	7
Rube Walker	79	171	47	.275	5	26
Gene Mauch	53	138	28	.203	1	7
Dick Culler	48	89	15	.169	0	5
Cliff Aberson	12	32	6	.188	1	6
Jeff Cross	16	20	2	.100	0	0
Don Johnson	6	12	3	.250	0	0
Danny Lynch	7	7	2	.286	1	1
Carmen Mauro	3	5	1	.200	1	1
Carl Sawatski	2	2	0	.000	0	0

=== Pitching ===
==== Starting pitchers ====
Note: G = Games pitched; IP = Innings pitched; W = Wins; L = Losses; ERA = Earned run average; SO = Strikeouts

Player	G	IP	W	L	ERA	SO
Johnny Schmitz	34	242.0	18	13	2.64	100
Russ Meyer	29	164.2	10	10	3.66	89
Dutch McCall	30	151.1	4	13	4.82	89

==== Other pitchers ====
Note: G = Games pitched; IP = Innings pitched; W = Wins; L = Losses; ERA = Earned run average; SO = Strikeouts

Player	G	IP	W	L	ERA	SO
Bob Rush	36	133.1	5	11	3.92	72
Hank Borowy	39	127.0	5	10	4.89	50
Ralph Hamner	27	111.1	5	9	4.69	53
Cliff Chambers	29	103.2	2	9	4.43	51
Doyle Lade	19	87.1	5	6	4.02	29
Warren Hacker	3	3.0	0	1	21.00	0

==== Relief pitchers ====
Note: G = Games pitched; W = Wins; L = Losses; SV = Saves; ERA = Earned run average; SO = Strikeouts

Player	G	W	L	SV	ERA	SO
Bob Chipman	34	2	1	4	3.58	16
Emil Kush	34	1	4	3	4.38	31
Jess Dobernic	54	7	2	1	3.15	48
Paul Erickson	3	0	0	0	6.35	4
Ben Wade	2	0	1	0	7.20	1
Tony Jacobs	1	0	0	0	4.50	2
Don Carlsen	1	0	0	0	36.00	1

== Farm system ==
Level	Team	League	Manager
AAA	Los Angeles Angels	Pacific Coast League	Bill Kelly
AA	Nashville Vols	Southern Association	Larry Gilbert
A	Macon Peaches	Sally League	Don Osborn
A	Des Moines Bruins	Western League	Stan Hack
B	Decatur Commodores	Illinois–Indiana–Iowa League	Red Lucas and Nelson Burbrink
B	Springfield Cubs	New England League	Bob Peterson
B	Selma Cloverleafs	Southeastern League	Morrie Arnovich
B	Fayetteville Cubs	Tri-State League	Skeeter Scalzi
C	Visalia Cubs	California League	John Intlekofer, Jigger Statz and Donald Anderson
C	Clinton Cubs	Central Association	Nelson Burbrink and Lee Eilbracht
C	Sioux Falls Canaries	Northern League	Jim Oglesby
C	Hutchinson/Springfield Cubs	Western Association	Frankie Piet
D	Elizabethton Betsy Cubs	Appalachian League	Adolph Matulis
D	St. Augustine Saints	Florida State League	Donald Anderson and John Sebastian
D	Centralia Cubs	Illinois State League	Willard Sellergren and Claude Passeau
D	Marion Cubs	Ohio–Indiana League	Lou Bekeza and Frank Kristie
D	Lumberton Cubs	Tobacco State League	Charles Jamin
D	Janesville Cubs	Wisconsin State League	Frank Kristie and Lou Bekeza

LEAGUE CHAMPIONS: Fayetteville, Clinton

Hutchinson club moved to Springfield (Missouri), July 21, 1948
