= 1948 Philadelphia Phillies season =

Major League Baseball season

1948 Philadelphia Phillies
- Also known as the Philadelphia Blue Jays
- League: National League
- Ballpark: Shibe Park
- City: Philadelphia, Pennsylvania
- Owners: R. R. M. Carpenter
- General managers: R. R. M. Carpenter, Jr.
- Managers: Ben Chapman, Eddie Sawyer
- Television: WPTZ/WCAU (Claude Haring)
- Radio: WIBG (By Saam, Chuck Thompson)

The 1948 Philadelphia Phillies season was the 66th season in the history of the franchise.

== Regular season ==
The 1948 campaign marked the Phillies' 16th consecutive losing season. This stood as the major league record until the Pittsburgh Pirates broke it in 2009 with their 17th consecutive losing season.

=== Season standings ===
National League
Team	W	L	Pct.	GB	Home	Road
Boston Braves	91	62	.595	—	45‍–‍31	46‍–‍31
St. Louis Cardinals	85	69	.552	6½	44‍–‍33	41‍–‍36
Brooklyn Dodgers	84	70	.545	7½	36‍–‍41	48‍–‍29
Pittsburgh Pirates	83	71	.539	8½	47‍–‍31	36‍–‍40
New York Giants	78	76	.506	13½	37‍–‍40	41‍–‍36
Philadelphia Phillies	66	88	.429	25½	32‍–‍44	34‍–‍44
Cincinnati Reds	64	89	.418	27	32‍–‍45	32‍–‍44
Chicago Cubs	64	90	.416	27½	35‍–‍42	29‍–‍48

=== Record vs. opponents ===
1948 National League record Sources:
Team	BSN	BRO	CHC	CIN	NYG	PHI	PIT	STL
Boston	—	14–8	16–6–1	13–8	11–11	14–8	12–10	11–11
Brooklyn	8–14	—	11–11	18–4	11–11–1	15–7	9–13	12–10
Chicago	6–16–1	11–11	—	10–12	11–11	7–15	8–14	11–11
Cincinnati	8–13	4–18	12–10	—	10–12	11–11	9–13	10–12
New York	11–11	11–11–1	11–11	12–10	—	14–8	12–10	7–15
Philadelphia	8–14	7–15	15–7	11–11	8–14	—	12–10–1	5–17
Pittsburgh	10–12	13–9	14–8	13–9	10–12	10–12–1	—	13–9–1
St. Louis	11–11	10–12	11–11	12–10	15–7	17–5	9–13–1	—

=== Notable transactions ===
- April 7, 1948: Ralph LaPointe and $30,000 were traded by the Phillies to the St. Louis Cardinals for Dick Sisler.
- April 8, 1948: Phillies purchased the contract of Richie Ashburn from the Toronto Maple Leafs

=== Roster ===
1948 Philadelphia Phillies
Roster
Pitchers: 35 Charlie Bicknell; 30 Blix Donnelly; 34 Monk Dubiel; 41 Paul Erickson; 37 Lou Grasmick; 33,27 Ken Heintzelman; 21 Ed Heusser; 17 Oscar Judd; 26 Dick Koecher; -- Jim Konstanty; 20 Dutch Leonard; 18 Sam Nahem; 36 Al Porto; 12 Lou Possehl; 36 Robin Roberts; 22,19 Schoolboy Rowe; 32,28 Curt Simmons; 36 Nick Strincevich; 9 Jocko Thompson	Catchers: 25 Al Lakeman; 41 Stan Lopata; 22,8 Don Padgett; 24 Andy Seminick; 17 Hal Wagner; Infielders: 27,2 Putsy Caballero; 34,3 Bert Haas; 6,1 Granny Hamner; 23 Willie Jones; 16,5 Eddie Miller; 15 Bama Rowell; 10,12 Howie Schultz; 6 Dick Sisler; 9 Emil Verban	Outfielders: 1 Richie Ashburn; 16 Johnny Blatnik; 14 Del Ennis; 18 Jackie Mayo; 4 Harry Walker	Manager: 7 Ben Chapman; 32 Dusty Cooke; 7 Eddie Sawyer; Coaches: 11 Benny Bengough; 32 Dusty Cooke; 40 Maje McDonnell; 31 Cy Perkins

== Player stats ==
=== Batting ===
==== Starters by position ====
Note: Pos = Position; G = Games played; AB = At bats; H = Hits; Avg. = Batting average; HR = Home runs; RBI = Runs batted in

Pos	Player	G	AB	H	Avg.	HR	RBI
C	Andy Seminick	125	391	88	.225	13	44
1B	Dick Sisler	121	446	122	.274	11	56
2B	Granny Hamner	129	446	116	.260	3	48
SS	Eddie Miller	130	468	115	.246	14	61
3B	Putsy Caballero	113	351	86	.245	0	19
OF	Johnny Blatnik	121	415	108	.260	6	45
OF	Del Ennis	152	589	171	.290	30	95
OF	Richie Ashburn	117	463	154	.333	2	40

==== Other batters ====
Note: G = Games played; AB = At bats; H = Hits; Avg. = Batting average; HR = Home runs; RBI = Runs batted in

Player	G	AB	H	Avg.	HR	RBI
Bert Haas	95	333	94	.282	4	34
Harry Walker	112	332	97	.292	2	23
Bama Rowell	77	196	47	.240	1	22
Emil Verban	55	169	39	.231	0	11
Don Padgett	36	74	17	.230	0	7
Al Lakeman	32	68	11	.162	1	4
Willie Jones	17	60	20	.333	2	9
Jackie Mayo	12	35	8	.229	0	3
Stan Lopata	6	15	2	.133	0	2
Howie Schultz	6	13	1	.077	0	1
Hal Wagner	3	4	0	.000	0	0

=== Pitching ===
==== Starting pitchers ====
Note: G = Games pitched; IP = Innings pitched; W = Wins; L = Losses; ERA = Earned run average; SO = Strikeouts

Player	G	IP	W	L	ERA	SO
Dutch Leonard	34	225.2	12	17	2.51	92
Curt Simmons	31	170.0	7	13	4.87	86
Schoolboy Rowe	30	148.0	10	10	4.07	46
Robin Roberts	20	146.2	7	9	3.19	84
Blix Donnelly	26	131.2	5	7	3.69	46
Jocko Thompson	2	13.0	1	0	2.77	7

==== Other pitchers ====
Note: G = Games pitched; IP = Innings pitched; W = Wins; L = Losses; ERA = Earned run average; SO = Strikeouts

Player	G	IP	W	L	ERA	SO
Monk Dubiel	37	150.1	8	10	3.89	42
Ken Heintzelman	27	130.0	6	11	4.29	57
Paul Erickson	4	17.1	2	0	5.19	5
Nick Strincevich	6	16.2	0	1	9.18	4
Lou Possehl	3	14.2	1	1	4.91	7
Oscar Judd	4	14.1	0	2	6.91	7

==== Relief pitchers ====
Note: G = Games pitched; W = Wins; L = Losses; SV = Saves; ERA = Earned run average; SO = Strikeouts

Player	G	W	L	SV	ERA	SO
Ed Heusser	33	3	2	3	4.99	22
Sam Nahem	28	3	3	0	7.02	30
Charlie Bicknell	17	0	1	0	5.96	5
Jim Konstanty	6	1	0	2	0.93	7
Dick Koecher	3	0	1	0	3.00	2
Al Porto	3	0	0	0	0.00	1
Lou Grasmick	2	0	0	0	7.20	2
Al Lakeman	1	0	0	0	13.50	0

== Farm system ==
Level	Team	League	Manager
AAA	Toronto Maple Leafs	International League	Eddie Sawyer and Dick Porter
A	Utica Blue Sox	Eastern League	Dick Porter and Patrick Colgan
B	Terre Haute Phillies	Illinois–Indiana–Iowa League	Patrick Colgan and Dale Jones
B	Wilmington Blue Rocks	Interstate League	Jack Sanford
B	Portland Pilots	New England League	Del Bissonette
C	Schenectady Blue Jays	Canadian–American League	Leon Riley
C	Vandergrift Pioneers	Middle Atlantic League	Floyd "Pat" Patterson and Lew Krausse, Sr.
C	Salina Blue Jays	Western Association	Vance Dinges
D	Dover Phillies	Eastern Shore League	Guy Glaser and Grover Wearshing
D	Baton Rouge Red Sticks	Evangeline League	Dick Carter
D	Klamath Falls Gems	Far West League	Joe Gantenbein
D	Americus Phillies	Georgia–Florida League	Le Grant Scott and Eddie Murphy
D	Carbondale Pioneers	North Atlantic League	Dan Carnevale
D	Bradford Blue Wings	PONY League	George Savino
D	Appleton Papermakers	Wisconsin State League	Whitey Gluchoski

LEAGUE CHAMPIONS: Carbondale
