= Charlie Bicknell =

Charlie Bicknell may refer to:

- Charlie Bicknell (footballer) (1905–1994), English footballer
- Charlie Bicknell (baseball) (1928–2013), American Major League Baseball pitcher
