= Woody Main =

American baseball player (1922–1992)

- Pitcher
- Born: February 12, 1922; Delano, California, U.S.
- Died: June 27, 1992 (aged 70); Whittier, California, U.S.
- Batted: Right Threw: Right

MLB debut
- April 21, 1948, for the Pittsburgh Pirates

Last MLB appearance
- April 28, 1953, for the Pittsburgh Pirates

MLB statistics
- Win–loss record: 4–13
- Earned run average: 5.14
- Innings pitched: 204 2/3
- Stats at Baseball Reference

Teams
- Pittsburgh Pirates (1948; 1950; 1952–1953)

Forrest Harry "Woody" Main (February 12, 1922 – June 27, 1992) was an American professional baseball player. He was a 6 ft 3 in (1.91 m), 195 lb (88 kg) right-handed pitcher who appeared in 79 Major League games for the Pittsburgh Pirates between 1948 and 1953.

Born in Delano, California, Main first signed with the New York Yankees and pitched in their farm system in 1941–42 and 1946–47, and served in the United States Marine Corps during World War II. Although he compiled a poor won–loss record of 22–44 during his four years in the Yankee system, he did post a winning mark (7–6) with the 1947 Kansas City Blues and when the Blues' manager, Billy Meyer, was appointed skipper of the 1948 Pirates, he selected Main in the winter Rule 5 draft. Main spent the next seven seasons in the Pittsburgh organization, including two full seasons (1948 and 1952) at the MLB level.

The 1952 Pirates — losers of 112 games and finishing 54 1/2 games out of first place in the National League — are often listed as one of the worst teams in Major League history. Main worked in a team-leading 48 games for the 1952 Bucs, eleven as a starting pitcher. Although he won only two of 14 decisions, he threw two complete games and recorded two saves, and his 4.46 earned run average was almost two-tenths of a point lower than the staff ERA of 4.65. One of his victories (and complete games) was a 6–2 triumph over the defending NL champion New York Giants on June 17 at the Polo Grounds.

Main gave up 210 hits and 84 bases on balls in 204 2/3 innings of Major League service, while notching 107 strikeouts. He left baseball after the 1954 season.
