= Lou Lombardo =

Lou Lombardo may refer to:

- Lou Lombardo (baseball)
- Lou Lombardo (filmmaker)
