= Earl Turner =

Earl Turner may refer to:

- Earl Turner (baseball) (1923–1999), Major League Baseball player
- Earl Turner (film editor) (1884–1971)
- Earl Turner, fictional character in The Turner Diaries
