= Elmer Sexauer =

American baseball player (1926-2011)

- Pitcher
- Born: May 21, 1926; St. Louis County, Missouri, U.S.
- Died: June 27, 2011 (aged 85); Atlanta, Georgia, U.S.
- Batted: Right Threw: Right

MLB debut
- September 6, 1948, for the Brooklyn Dodgers

Last MLB appearance
- September 12, 1948, for the Brooklyn Dodgers

MLB statistics
- Win–loss record: 0–0
- Earned run average: 13.50
- Strikeouts: 0
- Stats at Baseball Reference

Teams
- Brooklyn Dodgers (1948)

Elmer George Sexauer (May 21, 1926 – June 27, 2011) was an American professional baseball pitcher who appeared in two Major League Baseball games for the 1948 Brooklyn Dodgers. Born in St. Louis County, Missouri, the 6 ft 4 in (1.93 m), 220 lb (100 kg) right-hander was an alumnus of Wake Forest University.

Sexauer's pro career lasted only two seasons: 1948 and 1949. After beginning 1948 in the minor leagues with a promising campaign at Class B Danville — he went 11–7 with a 2.25 earned run average in 24 games — he was recalled after September 1, and made his MLB debut on September 6, 1948, in relief against the eventual National League champion Boston Braves at Braves Field. Called into the contest in the sixth inning with the Dodgers trailing 4–0, he retired Earl Torgeson and Bob Elliott before leaving the contest for a pinch hitter. Six days later, at the Polo Grounds, Sexauer again entered a contest the Dodgers were trailing — 4–1 to the New York Giants — and again faced two batters. But this time, he walked them both before being lifted for Hugh Casey. When one of Sexauer's baserunners, future 1951 hero Bobby Thomson, scored, Sexauer was charged with an earned run. It was final appearance in the major leagues.

A severe shoulder injury limited his career to just two more games, for Class B Wilmington in the Philadelphia Phillies' organization in 1949.

For his two major-league appearances, Sexauer faced four hitters and allowed no hits without recording a strikeout. But the single earned run he allowed saddled him with a career 13.50 earned run average in two-thirds of an inning pitched.

== Subject of Erskine anecdote ==
The book Carl Erskine's Tales from the Dodgers Dugout: Extra Innings (2004) is composed of short stories from the former Dodgers' pitcher. Sexauer is prominent in one of these stories, entitled "Elmer and Jocko".

The story chronicles an unusual interaction between Sexauer and Hall of Fame umpire Jocko Conlan. According to Erskine, a Dodger had thrown a towel from the Brooklyn dugout onto the field towards Conlan to protest one of his calls, but Conlan failed to spot the culprit. The angry umpire approached Dodger manager Burt Shotton, informing him that someone had to be ejected for the incident. Shotton — also unaware of who threw the towel — offered up Sexauer, since the pitcher was a rookie who had just been brought up from the minors.

Sexauer was thus ejected before he was able to throw a single pitch in the majors. The innocent rookie left the field to a chorus of boos from the opposing crowd.

However, Erskine's widely quoted story may be inaccurate or apocryphal. It records the incident as occurring in 1950, not 1948 — and Sexauer left pro baseball entirely in 1949, the previous season. Retrosheet's official entries for Sexauer show no ejections during his brief MLB tenure, which was confined to 1948. The same source records that the only Dodger ejected by Conlan in 1948 was Pete Reiser, on September 25.
