= Johnny Bucha =

American baseball player (1925–1996)

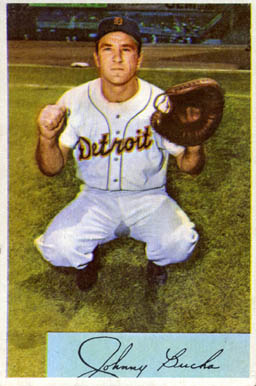
- Catcher
- Born: January 22, 1925; Allentown, Pennsylvania, U.S.
- Died: April 28, 1996 (aged 71); Bethlehem, Pennsylvania, U.S.
- Batted: Right Threw: Right

MLB debut
- May 2, 1948, for the St. Louis Cardinals

Last MLB appearance
- September 25, 1953, for the Detroit Tigers

MLB statistics
- Batting average: .205
- Home runs: 1
- Runs batted in: 15
- Stats at Baseball Reference

Teams
- St. Louis Cardinals (1948, 1950); Detroit Tigers (1953)

John George Bucha (January 22, 1925 – April 28, 1996) was an American professional baseball player whose 18-year career included 84 games in Major League Baseball (MLB) over three seasons. A catcher and native of Allentown, Pennsylvania, Bucha appeared in only two games for the 1948 St. Louis Cardinals, but was a full-year member of the 1950 Redbirds (getting into 22 games) and the 1953 Detroit Tigers (appearing in 60 contests). He threw and batted right-handed, stood 5 feet 11 inches (1.80 m) tall and weighed 190 pounds (86 kg).

Bucha's playing career lasted from 1943 through 1960. He joined the Cardinals' organization as an 18-year-old, playing for his hometown Allentown Wings of the Class B Interstate League. His minor league career would see him play in over 1,400 games, including over 1,000 games in Triple-A. At the MLB level, Bucha collected 40 hits, including ten doubles and one home run, in 195 career at bats. His home run came on September 9, 1953, against pitcher Harry Byrd at Connie Mack Stadium, as Bucha's Tigers defeated the Philadelphia Athletics, 8–2.

Bucha began 1954 with the Tigers' Triple-A affiliate, the Buffalo Bisons, but on June 9 he was traded to the Brooklyn Dodgers, along with Chuck Kress and Ernie Nevel, in exchange for Wayne Belardi. Bucha remained at the Triple-A level for the rest of his baseball career.
