= Jim Blackburn (baseball) =

American baseball pitcher (1924–1969)

- Pitcher
- Born: June 19, 1924; Warsaw, Kentucky, U.S.
- Died: October 26, 1969 (aged 45); Cincinnati, Ohio, U.S.
- Batted: Right Threw: Right

MLB debut
- July 24, 1948, for the Cincinnati Reds

Last MLB appearance
- May 5, 1951, for the Cincinnati Reds

MLB statistics
- Win–loss record: 0–2
- Earned run average: 5.50
- Strikeouts: 11
- Stats at Baseball Reference

Teams
- Cincinnati Reds (1948, 1951)

James Ray Blackburn (June 19, 1924 – October 26, 1969) was an American professional baseball pitcher who appeared in 18 games in Major League Baseball for the Cincinnati Reds in 1948 and 1951. The right-hander was a native of Warsaw, Kentucky, who stood 6 feet 4 inches (1.93 m) tall and weighed 175 pounds (79 kg).

== World War II veteran and POW ==
Blackburn's professional career began at age 17 in 1941, and was interrupted in 1943 by service in the United States Army. Attaining the rank of sergeant, Blackburn saw combat in the European Theatre of World War II. He was wounded in the leg in Belgium on December 18, 1944, during the Battle of St. Vith, one of the opening engagements of the Battle of the Bulge, and was taken as a prisoner of war by the German army; while a POW, his weight dwindled to 100 pounds (45 kg). After he was liberated by advancing American troops in May 1945, he required months of hospitalization to regain his health.

== Return to baseball ==
Blackburn was able to return to baseball in 1946. In July 1948 he was recalled to Cincinnati for his first major-league stint, and he appeared in 16 games, all in relief, for a second-division Reds' team. He proved to be highly effective through his first 11 games, but three rough September outings saddled him with two losses and inflated his earned run average from 1.59 to 4.18. Blackburn then missed the entire 1949 season. In 1950, he returned to baseball in the minor leagues, winning 21 games with a stellar 2.73 ERA in the Double-A Texas League. As a result, the Reds gave him a second trial in the early weeks of 1951, but he was ineffective in two appearances, posting a 17.18 ERA in only 32/3 innings pitched.

He resumed his career in the minors, where he played into the 1952 campaign, his last in baseball. In his 18 major-league games, all in relief, he compiled an 0–2 record and a 5.50 ERA, with no saves; in 36 innings pitched, he allowed 46 hits and 16 bases on balls, with 11 strikeouts. Jim Blackburn died in Cincinnati at the age of 45 on October 26, 1969.
