= Hal Bamberger =

American baseball player (1924-2010)

- Outfielder
- Born: October 29, 1924; Lebanon, Pennsylvania, U.S.
- Died: November 14, 2010 (aged 86); Reading, Pennsylvania, U.S.
- Batted: Left Threw: Right

MLB debut
- September 15, 1948, for the New York Giants

Last MLB appearance
- October 3, 1948, for the New York Giants

MLB statistics
- Batting average: .083
- Home runs: 0
- Runs batted in: 0
- Stats at Baseball Reference

Teams
- New York Giants (1948)

Harold Earl Bamberger (October 29, 1924 – November 14, 2010) was an American professional baseball outfielder who batted left-handed and threw right-handed. He graduated from Cornwall High School in Lebanon, Pennsylvania, after lettering in four sports, then served in the U.S. Marine Corps for three years, mostly in the Pacific Ocean theatre of World War II.

In seven games with Leo Durocher's New York Giants during the 1948 season, Bamberger posted a .083 batting average (1-for-12) with no runs or RBI. He spent eight years in the minor leagues, in 1942 and from 1946 to 1952, compiling a .287 average and 54 home runs over 771 games. He managed the Class-C Muskogee Giants in 1951 and the Reamstown team in the Lebanon-Lancaster League.

After baseball, Bamberger worked as a general foreman at Grace Mines for thirty years, then at Hopewell Culture National Historical Park for six. He died in Reading, Pennsylvania, aged 86.
