= Lefty Sloat =

American baseball player (1918–2003)

- Pitcher
- Born: December 1, 1918; Nokomis, Illinois, U.S.
- Died: April 18, 2003 (aged 84); Saint Paul, Minnesota, U.S.
- Batted: Right Threw: Left

MLB debut
- April 24, 1948, for the Brooklyn Dodgers

Last MLB appearance
- May 13, 1949, for the Chicago Cubs

MLB statistics
- Win–loss record: 0–1
- Earned run average: 6.61
- Strikeouts: 4
- Stats at Baseball Reference

Teams
- Brooklyn Dodgers (1948); Chicago Cubs (1949)

Dwain Clifford Sloat (December 1, 1918 – April 18, 2003) was an American professional baseball pitcher who appeared in nine Major League Baseball games during the 1948 and 1949 seasons for the Brooklyn Dodgers and Chicago Cubs. The southpaw batted right-handed, stood 6 feet (1.83 m) tall and weighed 168 pounds (76 kg). He was born in Nokomis, Illinois.

== Baseball career ==
Sloat's eleven-season professional career began in the minor leagues in 1938 and was interrupted for four years during the World War II period, when he served in the United States Army.

Sloat's contract was acquired by the Brooklyn Dodgers during the war when they purchased the St. Paul Saints of the American Association. He debuted in the major leagues at age 29 in April 1948, during a four-game, early-season stint with the Dodgers. In his lone start, on May 8 against the Cubs at Wrigley Field, he allowed four earned runs in 42/3 innings pitched and was tagged with the 6–0 loss.

After he returned to the minors for the balance of 1948, he was selected by the Cubs in the off-season Rule 5 Draft. As in Brooklyn the year before, Sloat was given an early-season audition, appearing for the Cubs in five contests in April and May 1949. In his only start in a Chicago uniform, Sloat earned a no-decision on April 24 at Sportsman's Park against the contending St. Louis Cardinals, going four innings and permitting two earned runs in a game St. Louis ultimately captured 5–4 in their final at bat in the ninth frame.

In his nine big-league appearances, Sloat posted a won–lost record of 0–1 and an earned run average of 6.61, with two games finished in relief. In 161/3 innings pitched, he permitted 21 hits and 11 bases on balls, and was credited with four strikeouts.

He retired from baseball after the 1952 season.
