= Larry Miggins =

American baseball player (1925–2023)

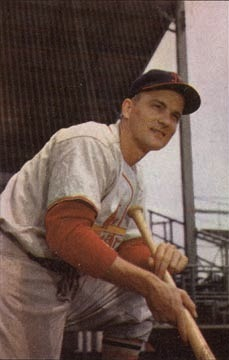
- Outfielder
- Born: August 20, 1925; The Bronx, New York, U.S.
- Died: December 12, 2023 (aged 98); Houston, Texas, U.S.
- Batted: Right Threw: Right

MLB debut
- October 3, 1948, for the St. Louis Cardinals

Last MLB appearance
- September 28, 1952, for the St. Louis Cardinals

MLB statistics
- Batting average: .227
- Home runs: 2
- Runs batted in: 10
- Stats at Baseball Reference

Teams
- St. Louis Cardinals (1948; 1952)

Lawrence Edward Miggins (August 20, 1925 – December 12, 2023) was an American outfielder and first baseman in Major League Baseball who played for the St. Louis Cardinals in parts of the 1948 and 1952 seasons. Listed at 6 ft 4 in (1.93 m), 198 lb (90 kg), Miggins batted and threw right-handed. He was born in The Bronx, New York, to Irish immigrants.

== Biography ==
Miggins was signed by the New York Giants in 1944 and was assigned immediately to Double-A Jersey City, then the top farm system affiliate of the Giants, but his baseball career was interrupted late in the year after he entered service in the United States Merchant Navy during World War II. Following his discharge, Miggins rejoined Jersey City in 1946, being obtained a year later by the Cardinals from the Giants in the Rule 5 draft. In 1946, Miggins was the starting third basemen for the Jersey City Giants when they played the Montreal Royals on Opening Day. That game marked the professional debut of Jackie Robinson. Miggins was the last surviving member of the Giants from that game. In two seasons at St. Louis, Miggins posted a .227 batting average (22-for-97) in 43 games, including five doubles, one triple and two home runs, while driving in 10 runs and scoring seven times. His childhood friend, Vin Scully, called Miggins's first home run.

Miggins also played nine seasons of Minor League ball between 1944 and 1954, batting .265 with 143 home runs in 944 games. After his baseball career, Miggins attended University of St. Thomas and went on to earn a master's degree from Sam Houston State. He later worked in the U.S. Probation and Parole office in Houston, and also served as baseball coach for his alma mater. In 2003, Miggins was inducted into the Texas Baseball Hall of Fame.

Miggins was the last living player who played for the St. Louis Cardinals in the 1940s. He died in Houston on December 12, 2023, at the age of 98.
