= Earl Turner (baseball) =

American baseball player (1923–1999)

- Catcher
- Born: May 6, 1923; Pittsfield, Massachusetts, U.S.
- Died: October 20, 1999 (aged 76); Lee, Massachusetts, U.S.
- Batted: Right Threw: Right

MLB debut
- September 25, 1948, for the Pittsburgh Pirates

Last MLB appearance
- July 19, 1950, for the Pittsburgh Pirates

MLB statistics
- Batting average: .240
- Home runs: 3
- Runs batted in: 5
- Stats at Baseball Reference

Teams
- Pittsburgh Pirates (1948, 1950)

Earl Edwin Turner (May 6, 1923 – October 20, 1999) was an American professional baseball player. Turner was a backup catcher in Major League Baseball who played in 42 total games for the Pittsburgh Pirates during the 1948 and 1950 seasons. A native of Pittsfield, Massachusetts, Turner batted and threw right-handed; he stood 5 feet 9 inches (1.75 m) tall and weighed 170 pounds (77 kg). He served in the United States Army during World War II.

In a two-season MLB career, Turner was a .240 hitter (18 hits in 75 at bats) with three home runs and five RBI. His three homers, all solo shots, were hit in 1950 off Ralph Branca (June 24), Bobby Hogue (July 16, in a game in which Turner went 3-for-4), and Johnny Sain (July 17, his next-to-last Major League game).

Turner retired from pro ball after the 1952 minor league season and died in Lee, Massachusetts, at the age of 76.
