= Danny Lynch (baseball) =

American baseball player (1926–1978)

- Second baseman
- Born: February 7, 1926; Dallas, Texas, U.S.
- Died: June 30, 1978 (aged 52); Plano, Texas, U.S.
- Batted: Right Threw: Right

MLB debut
- September 14, 1948, for the Chicago Cubs

Last MLB appearance
- October 2, 1948, for the Chicago Cubs

MLB statistics
- Batting average: .286
- Slugging percentage: .714
- Home runs: 1
- Stats at Baseball Reference

Teams
- Chicago Cubs (1948)

Matthew Daniel Lynch Jr. (Note: Lynch's draft registration card of February 1944 listed his name as "Matt Dan Lynch, Jr.", while his father's draft registration card of two years earlier had read "Matt Dan Lynch, Sr.") (Note: Lynch was listed by Baseball-Reference.com as "Dummy" Lynch before May 2021, but there is no indication that the nickname was actually used for Lynch. "Dummy" Lynch may actually have been 19th-century pitcher Thomas Lynch.) (February 7, 1926 – June 30, 1978) was an American professional baseball player. He played briefly in Major League Baseball, for the Chicago Cubs in 1948.

== Biography ==
A native of Dallas, Texas, Lynch was a paratrooper in the United States Army during World War II. After the war, he attended Southern Methodist University (SMU), where he played both baseball and basketball. The 1947 edition of The Rotunda, SMU's yearbook, includes a baseball team photo with both Lynch and future Heisman Trophy winner Doak Walker.

Lynch's father, who shared the same name, had played in the minor leagues for a decade as a middle infielder. The younger Lynch was originally signed by the Pittsburgh Pirates in June 1948, and played 91 games for the minor league Waco Pirates. However, in September 1948, Lynch was declared a free agent after Commissioner of Baseball Happy Chandler ruled that the Pirates had hired the elder Lynch as a scout as a way to hide a bonus payment. Lynch was then signed by the Chicago Cubs on September 7, and married on September 8.

A week after being signed, Lynch played in Major League Baseball for the Cubs, appearing in seven games through the end of the 1948 season; one as a second baseman, one as a pinch runner, and five as a pinch hitter. In seven major league at bats, he had two hits, including a home run off of Johnny Sain, for a .286 batting average and a .714 slugging percentage. Lynch did not return to the major leagues, but he played in the minor leagues through 1954, including over 300 games at the Triple-A level.

After retiring from baseball, Lynch became a lawyer in Texas. He died in an automobile accident in June 1978 in Plano, Texas.
