= Don Lang (third baseman) =

American baseball player (1915–2010)

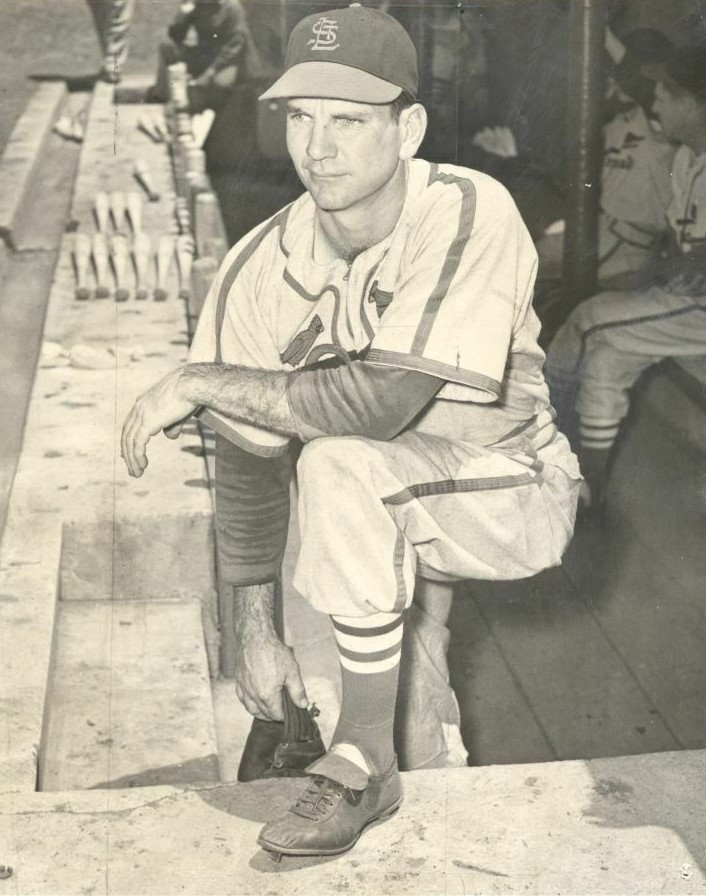
- Third base
- Born: March 15, 1915; Selma, California
- Died: September 1, 2010 (aged 95); Ventura, California
- Batted: Right Threw: Right

MLB debut
- July 4, 1938, for the Cincinnati Reds

Last MLB appearance
- October 1, 1948, for the St. Louis Cardinals

MLB statistics
- Batting average: .268
- Hits: 100
- Runs batted in: 42
- Stats at Baseball Reference

Teams
- Cincinnati Reds (1938); St. Louis Cardinals (1948)

Donald Charles Lang (March 15, 1915 – September 1, 2010) was a third baseman in Major League Baseball who played for the Cincinnati Reds (1938) and St. Louis Cardinals(1948). Born in Selma, California, he batted and threw right-handed.

Listed at 6 feet 0 inches (1.83 m) and 175 pounds (79 kg), Lang had a 12-season baseball career between 1936 and 1950 which was interrupted by serving to his country during World War II (Pacific, 1943–45), while property of the Boston Red Sox. He played 10 seasons in the minors, including nine of Triple-A ball, and two in major league ten years apart.

Lang entered in the majors in 1938, appearing in 25 games with the Cincinnati Reds. In 1948 he became the everyday third baseman for the St. Louis Cardinals due to a career-ending injury to incumbent Whitey Kurowski.

In 138 major league games, Lang posted a .268 batting average (100-for-373) with five home runs and 42 RBI, including 35 runs, 17 doubles, two triples and a .355 on-base percentage.
