= Mickey McGowan =

American baseball player (1921–2003)

- Pitcher
- Born: November 26, 1921; Dothan, Alabama, U.S.
- Died: March 8, 2003 (aged 81); Waycross, Georgia, U.S.
- Batted: Left Threw: Left

MLB debut
- April 22, 1948, for the New York Giants

Last MLB appearance
- May 1, 1948, for the New York Giants

MLB statistics
- Win–loss record: 0–0
- Earned run average: 7.36
- Strikeouts: 2
- Stats at Baseball Reference

Teams
- New York Giants (1948)

Tullis Earl "Mickey" McGowan (November 26, 1921 – March 8, 2003) was an American professional baseball player. He was a left-handed pitcher for one season (1948) with the New York Giants. For his career, he did not record a decision, with a 7.36 earned run average and two strikeouts in 3 2/3 innings pitched.

McGowan was born in Dothan, Alabama and later died in Waycross, Georgia at the age of 81.
