= Grady Wilson (baseball) =

American baseball player (1922–2003)

- Shortstop
- Born: November 23, 1922; Columbus, Georgia, U.S.
- Died: July 23, 2003 (aged 80); Columbus, Georgia, U.S.
- Batted: Right Threw: Right

MLB debut
- May 15, 1948, for the Pittsburgh Pirates

Last MLB appearance
- July 15, 1948, for the Pittsburgh Pirates

MLB statistics
- Batting average: .100
- Hits: 1
- Runs batted in: 1
- Stats at Baseball Reference

Teams
- Pittsburgh Pirates (1948)

Grady Herbert Wilson (November 23, 1922 – July 23, 2003) was an American professional baseball player. He played part of one season in Major League Baseball, appearing in 12 games for the Pittsburgh Pirates in 1948, primarily as a shortstop. He also had an extensive career in minor league baseball, spanning fourteen years from 1946–59, and then as a manager until 1966.
