= Charlie Bicknell (baseball) =

American baseball player (1928-2013)

- Pitcher
- Born: July 27, 1928; Plainfield, New Jersey, U.S.
- Died: November 24, 2013 (aged 85); Livingston, Montana, U.S.
- Batted: Right Threw: Right

MLB debut
- April 22, 1948, for the Philadelphia Phillies

Last MLB appearance
- September 18, 1949, for the Philadelphia Phillies

MLB statistics
- Win–loss record: 0–1
- Earned run average: 6.83
- Strikeouts: 9
- Stats at Baseball Reference

Teams
- Philadelphia Phillies (1948–1949)

Charles Stephen Bicknell (July 27, 1928 – November 24, 2013) was an American professional baseball pitcher who appeared in 30 games in Major League Baseball (MLB) for the Philadelphia Phillies during the 1948 and 1949 seasons. Bicknell threw and batted right-handed and was listed as 5 feet 11 inches (1.80 m) tall and 170 pounds (77 kg). He was born in Plainfield, New Jersey, where he graduated from high school. He attended Seton Hall University.

Of his 30 appearances, 29 came in a relief role. His only MLB decision, a loss, came in his only opportunity as a starting pitcher. On July 22, 1948, he took the mound against the Pittsburgh Pirates at Forbes Field, and failed to record an out, walking the first two batters in the Buc lineup before giving up an RBI single to future Baseball Hall of Famer Ralph Kiner. He then was replaced by reliever Ed Heusser, who allowed the two runners he inherited to score. Staked to a three-run, first-inning advantage, Pittsburgh went on to win, 5–3. In his two full big-league seasons, Bicknell surrendered 61 hits in 54 innings pitched, but had a poor 9-to-34 strikeout-to-walk ratio. His career earned run average was also subpar, at 6.83.

The Boston Braves acquired Bicknell in 1950 and sent him to the minor leagues, and he never returned to the majors. Altogether, he spent a decade (1947–1950 and 1952–1957) in professional baseball,
