= Babe Young =

American baseball player (1915–1983)

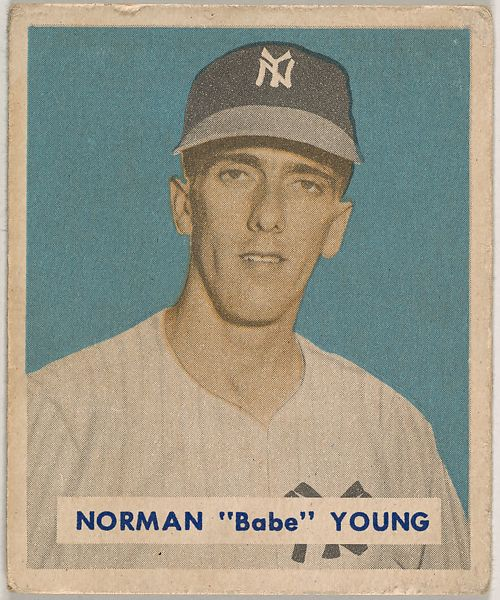
- First baseman
- Born: July 1, 1915; Astoria, New York, U.S.
- Died: December 25, 1983 (aged 68); Everett, Massachusetts, U.S.
- Batted: Left Threw: Left

MLB debut
- September 26, 1936, for the New York Giants

Last MLB appearance
- October 2, 1948, for the St. Louis Cardinals

MLB statistics
- Batting average: .273
- Home runs: 79
- Runs batted in: 415
- Stats at Baseball Reference

Teams
- New York Giants (1936, 1939–1942, 1946–1947); Cincinnati Reds (1947–1948); St. Louis Cardinals (1948)

Norman Robert Young (July 1, 1915 – December 25, 1983) was an American professional baseball player. He played all or part of eight seasons in Major League Baseball (MLB) for the New York Giants (1936, 1939–42 and 1946–47), Cincinnati Reds (1947–48) and St. Louis Cardinals (1948), primarily as a first baseman. He was a member of the Giants' 1936 National League pennant-winning team.

He finished 26th in voting for the 1940 NL MVP for playing in 149 Games and having 556 At Bats, 75 Runs, 159 Hits, 27 Doubles, 4 Triples, 17 Home Runs, 101 RBI, 4 Stolen Bases, 69 Walks, .286 Batting Average, .367 On-base percentage, .441 Slugging Percentage, 245 Total Bases and 5 Sacrifice Hits.

He finished 21st in voting for the 1941 NL MVP for playing in 152 Games and having 574 At Bats, 90 Runs, 152 Hits, 28 Doubles, 5 Triples, 25 Home Runs, 104 RBI, 1 Stolen Base, 66 Walks, .265 Batting Average, .346 On-base percentage, .462 Slugging Percentage, 265 Total Bases and 4 Sacrifice Hits .

After playing a partial 1942 season, he missed the 1943, 1944, and 1945 MLB seasons due to compelled military service in World War II. He returned in 1946, but never matched the pre-war success of his 1940 and 1941 seasons.

In 8 seasons he played in 728 Games and had 2,403 At Bats, 320 Runs, 656 Hits, 121 Doubles, 17 Triples, 79 Home Runs, 415 RBI, 9 Stolen Bases, 274 Walks, .273 Batting Average, .352 On-base percentage, .436 Slugging Percentage, 1,048 Total Bases and 15 Sacrifice Hits.

He died in Everett, Massachusetts at the age of 68.
