= Clarence Beers =

American baseball player (1918–2002)

- Pitcher
- Born: December 9, 1918; El Dorado, Kansas, U.S.
- Died: December 6, 2002 (aged 83); Tucson, Arizona, U.S.
- Batted: Right Threw: Right

MLB debut
- May 2, 1948, for the St. Louis Cardinals

Last MLB appearance
- May 2, 1948, for the St. Louis Cardinals

MLB statistics
- Win–loss record: 0–0
- Earned run average: 13.50
- Strikeouts: 0
- Stats at Baseball Reference

Teams
- St. Louis Cardinals (1948)

Clarence Scott Beers (December 9, 1918 – December 6, 2002) was an American professional baseball pitcher whose 13-season career included a single game played in the major leagues in 1948 as a member of the St. Louis Cardinals. Born in El Dorado, Kansas, Beers batted and threw right-handed, stood 6 feet (1.8 m) tall and weighed 175 pounds (79 kg).

He signed with St. Louis in 1937, but his minor league career was interrupted when he missed the 1938 season and the 1943–1945 campaigns, the latter because of his service in the United States Army Air Forces during World War II. He returned to baseball in 1946, and the following season he led the Double-A Texas League in games won (25) and posted a stellar 2.40 earned run average as a member of the Houston Buffaloes.

Beers was 29 years old when he received his only big-league opportunity on May 7, 1948. The Cardinals were trailing the Chicago Cubs at Sportsman's Park 7–4 when Beers was summoned to the mound in the eighth inning to relieve left-hander Ken Johnson with two men on base and one out. Beers faced seven batters, allowing a single, wild pitch, two doubles, and an intentional walk; he was the victim of a passed ball and an error committed by his catcher, Del Wilber. He retired two Cubs, Hank Schenz on a ground ball and Phil Cavarretta on a fly out. Beers permitted both inherited runners to score, and was charged with four runs of his own, although only one was earned. When he exited the game for a pinch hitter in the bottom of the inning, the Cubs led 13–4.

His final major league line included two-thirds of one inning pitched, one earned run allowed, and a career ERA of 13.50.

Beers returned to the minors following his appearance on May 2, and pitched through 1953 before leaving pro baseball. He died in Tucson, Arizona, three days short of his 84th birthday in 2002.
