= Pete Milne =

American baseball player (1925-1999)

- Outfielder
- Born: April 10, 1925; Mobile, Alabama, U.S.
- Died: April 11, 1999 (aged 74); Mobile, Alabama, U.S.
- Batted: Left Threw: Right

MLB debut
- September 15, 1948, for the New York Giants

Last MLB appearance
- May 14, 1950, for the New York Giants

MLB statistics
- Batting average: .233
- Home runs: 1
- Runs batted in: 9
- Stats at Baseball Reference

Teams
- New York Giants (1948–1950)

William James "Pete" Milne (April 10, 1925 – April 11, 1999) was an American professional baseball player. He played parts of three seasons in Major League Baseball, from 1948 until 1950, for the New York Giants, primarily as an outfielder. He also had a lengthy career in minor league baseball, playing professionally from 1943 until 1956.

== Starting out with Cleveland ==
Milne was originally signed by the Cleveland Indians back in 1943, and played in their organization that season, for the Batavia Clippers. He spent 1943 as a first baseman, playing 69 games and batting .332. Milne missed the next two seasons due to World War II, coming back in 1946 with the Wilkes-Barre Barons. He also played part of 1946 with the unaffiliated Charleston Rebels. After splitting the 1947 season between the Barons and the Spartanburg Peaches, he was drafted out of the Cleveland farm system by the New York Giants in the minor league draft.

== Three years in the major leagues ==
After playing most of 1948 for the Jersey City Giants, one of New York's top farm clubs, Milne made his major league debut on September 15. He played in 12 games down the stretch for the Giants, batting .222 in 27 at bats.

Milne opened the 1949 season with the Giants, playing in 31 games and batting .241 with one home run (an inside-the-park grand slam) before being sent back down to Jersey City. He spent most of his time as a pinch hitter that season, playing just one game in the field.

Milne was back at Jersey City in 1950, splitting most of the season between the minor league Giants and the Minneapolis Millers. He got one more late season chance, getting one hit in four at bats as a pinch hitter to finish his major league career.

== Back to the minor leagues ==
Milne was back in Minneapolis in 1951. He played 131 games for the Millers, batting an even .300, but did not get another call to the majors. He left the Giants organization after the season, playing the next three seasons with the Oakland Oaks of the Pacific Coast League. In 1955, he moved on to the PCL's Sacramento Solons, and then in 1956 returned to the Indians' organization for one last go-round. After batting just .220 for the Mobile Bears, Milne retired.

== Home run ==
Milne hit just one home run in his career, but it was quite memorable. In the 7th inning of a game against the Brooklyn Dodgers on April 27, 1949, Milne became the first and only player in MLB history to record a pinch hit inside the park grand slam home run. Milne entered the game as a pinch hitter against Pat McGlothin with the bases loaded. Milne proceeded to hit an Inside-the-park grand slam home run past a diving Duke Snider which gave the New York Giants an 11–8 lead. That wound up being the final score of the game.

== Sources ==
- Career statistics from Baseball Reference · Baseball Reference (Minors) · Retrosheet · Baseball Almanac, or Retrosheet
