= Jeff Cross (baseball) =

American baseball player (1918–1997)

- Infielder
- Born: August 28, 1918; Tulsa, Oklahoma, U.S.
- Died: July 23, 1997 (aged 78); Huntsville, Texas, U.S.
- Batted: Right Threw: Right

MLB debut
- September 27, 1942, for the St. Louis Cardinals

Last MLB appearance
- June 8, 1948, for the Chicago Cubs

MLB statistics
- Batting average: .162
- Home runs: 0
- Runs batted in: 10
- Stats at Baseball Reference

Teams
- St. Louis Cardinals (1942, 1946–1948); Chicago Cubs (1948)

Joffre James "Jeff" Cross (August 28, 1918 – July 23, 1997) was an American professional baseball infielder who appeared in 119 games over all or parts of four seasons (1942 and 1946–1948) in Major League Baseball for the St. Louis Cardinals and Chicago Cubs. Born in Tulsa, Oklahoma, he threw and batted right-handed, stood 5 feet 11 inches (1.80 m) tall and weighed 160 pounds (73 kg).

Cross played college baseball for the Oklahoma Sooners. Cross's professional career began in 1938 in the Cardinals' farm system. His first MLB game came on the last day of the 1942 National League season. He started at shortstop in the second game of a doubleheader for the World Series-bound Cardinals after they had clinched the league pennant with a victory in the opening game of that day's twin bill. Cross collected one hit in four at bats against the Cubs' Claude Passeau and played errorless ball in the field, as St. Louis won, 4–1, to increase the Redbirds' final margin to two full games ahead of the Brooklyn Dodgers. He then served in the United States Navy during World War II, missing three baseball seasons (1943–1945). Cross then spent all of the 1946 and 1947 campaigns on the Cardinals' roster, appearing in an even 100 games as a utility infielder, starting 14 games at shortstop, eight at second base, and four at third base. He batted only .217 and .102 respectively, and did not play in the 1946 World Series, won by the Cardinals in seven games over the Boston Red Sox. After two appearances as a pinch runner with the Cardinals in 1948, his contract was sold to the Cubs, for whom he collected only two hits in 20 at bats through June 8. He spent the balance of the year with the Double-A Shreveport Sports before retiring from baseball.

Altogether, Cross was credited with 23 hits (including four doubles) and ten runs batted in in the major leagues, batting .162 lifetime.

After his retirement from professional baseball, Cross managed the Houston Little League team to the 1950 Little League World Series championship.
