= Billy Meyer =

American baseball player and manager (1893–1957)

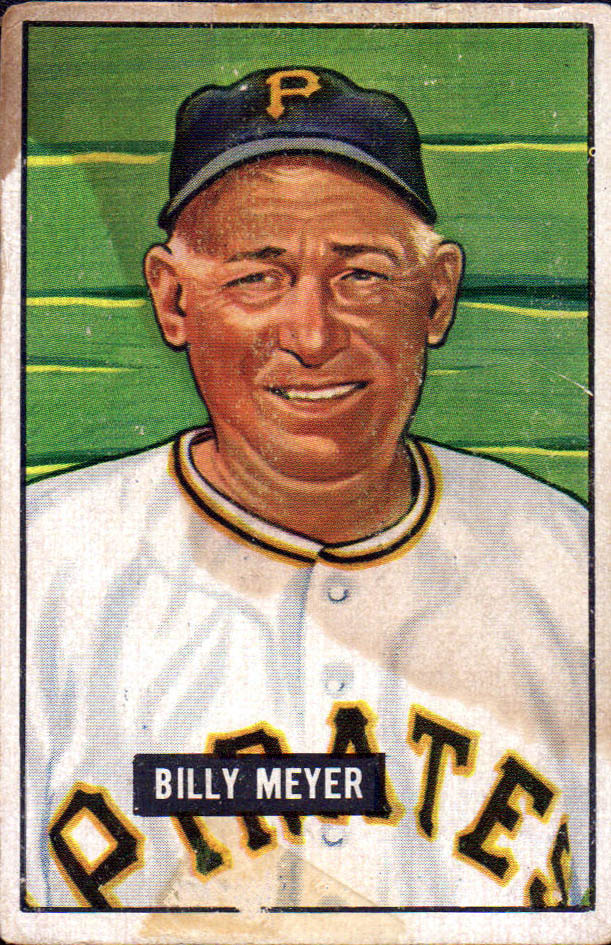
- Meyer as depicted in a baseball card by Bowman Gum, 1951
- Catcher / Manager
- Born: January 14, 1893; Knoxville, Tennessee, U.S.
- Died: March 31, 1957 (aged 64); Knoxville, Tennessee, U.S.
- Batted: Right Threw: Right

MLB debut
- September 6, 1913, for the Chicago White Sox

Last MLB appearance
- September 18, 1917, for the Philadelphia Athletics

MLB statistics
- Batting average: .236
- Home runs: 1
- Runs batted in: 21
- Managerial record: 317–452
- Winning %: .412
- Stats at Baseball Reference
- Managerial record at Baseball Reference

Teams
- As player: Chicago White Sox (1913); Philadelphia Athletics (1916–1917); As manager: Pittsburgh Pirates (1948–1952)

Career highlights and awards
- 1948 The Sporting News Major League Manager of the Year; Pittsburgh Pirates No. 1 retired

William Adam Meyer (January 14, 1893 – March 31, 1957) was an American baseball player and manager. He holds the dubious distinction of having played with, then managed, two of the worst teams in the history of Major League Baseball.

A catcher who spent most of his 19-year active (1910–1928) playing career in the minor leagues, he threw and batted right-handed, and was listed as 5 feet 9 inches (1.75 m) tall and 170 pounds (77 kg).

Meyer broke into the majors with the 1913 Chicago White Sox, though he appeared in only one game. Three years later, when he returned to the American League with the Philadelphia Athletics in 1916, he appeared in 50 games for a squad which won only 36 games and lost 117. The following year, he played in 62 games for an improved A's club which, however, still posted a 55–98 mark.

Then, a generation-and-a-half later, Meyer managed the 1952 Pittsburgh Pirates to the third-worst record in modern National League history, the Bucs winning only 42 of 154 games.

However, during the period from 1932 through 1947, Meyer was a successful minor league manager, helming high-level teams in the New York Yankees' organization and winning four playoff championships. In addition, in 1948, Meyer's first season at the helm of the Pirates, he was selected The Sporting News Major League Manager of the Year, after he led the Bucs to a surprising first-division finish.

== Early life ==
Meyer was born in Knoxville, Tennessee, to William and Carrie Meyer. His father, born in the Grand Duchy of Baden in Germany, had emigrated to the United States at age 16 and operated a brewery in Knoxville.

Meyer started playing baseball in grade school when his father bought him a catcher's mitt to catch his older brother. His hero was catcher Johnny Kling. He was a good student until high school, when baseball became such a primary focus that it even resulted in a school suspension. His father also owned a brewery in Smithton, Pennsylvania, for a time and the younger Meyer worked there during vacation. During his sophomore year of high school, Meyer was offered $75 per month to catch for a Lakeland, Florida, team, but was expected to inherit the brewery so his father resisted the idea. He went regardless, and played so well a Sanford, Florida, team offered him $175 per month to play for them. He caught for other Florida teams and finally hit a championship-winning home run for Gainesville, Florida. When he returned to Tennessee with $250, his father never protested against baseball again.

== Major league playing career ==
In 1915, Meyer played so well for a Davenport, Iowa, team Connie Mack acquired him to back up catcher Wally Schang for his major league Philadelphia Athletics. He recalled Mack had him catch for unpredictable young pitchers in order to save Schang. He played 50 games for the A's that year—and was thus on hand for a season in which the A's finished with the worst winning percentage in Major League Baseball history. He played 62 games for the A's in 1917. As it turned out, this would be Meyer's last season in the majors as an active player. He collected 71 hits, with seven doubles, three triples and one home run, batted .236, and was credited with 21 runs batted in.

After the season, Meyer was sold to the Louisville Colonels in the American Association. He would stay in Louisville for 11 years, and was a major contributor to the Colonels' American Association pennants in 1921 and 1925 under Joe McCarthy.

== Minor league managerial career ==
=== Playing manager ===
When McCarthy was called up to manage the Chicago Cubs for the 1926 season, Meyer was named to succeed him at the helm of the Colonels. In his first season, Louisville won a second consecutive pennant with a team which included future Baseball Hall of Fame second baseman Billy Herman (whom Meyer would replace as skipper of the Pirates over 20 years later). But when the Colonels promptly slumped to consecutive 100-loss seasons in 1927 and 1928, he was fired. At the same time, he was released as a player.

=== Yankees' organization ===
After spending three years (1929–1931) as a coach with the Minneapolis Millers, an American Association rival of the Colonels, Meyer became manager of the 1932 Springfield Rifles of the Eastern League, an affiliate of the New York Yankees, where McCarthy was in his second season as manager. Meyer had the Rifles in first place on July 17 when the league folded due to Depression-related financial troubles. Only two days later, was hired by the Binghamton Triplets of the New York–Pennsylvania League, another Yankees farm team. Meyer stayed in Binghamton for 31/2 years, winning the pennant in 1933 and split-season pennants in 1934 and 1935, and impressing George Weiss, head of the parent club's growing farm system. In 1936, Meyer moved up to the top-level Oakland Oaks of the Pacific Coast League, who then had a working agreement with the Bronx Bombers. He produced one playoff team in two seasons while at Oakland and was named to manage another top-level Yankees farm outlet, the Kansas City Blues of the American Association, in 1938.

For the next ten years, Meyer alternated as the manager of the Blues (1938–1941; 1946–1947) and another elite Yankee farm club, the Newark Bears of the International League (1942–1945). During that time, he won four pennants and finished second four times. His 1939 Blues, who finished 107–47 and won the Junior World Series for the second year in a row, were named the 12th-best team in history by Minor League Baseball. Meyer was named Minor League Manager of the Year by The Sporting News. Overall, as a manager in the minors, Meyer won eight pennants, narrowly missed a ninth, and finished in the second division only twice. On July 6, 1944, Meyer and Newark were in last place, 30 games behind Bucky Harris and his Buffalo Bisons, and had lost to Buffalo seven consecutive times. Newark rebounded by winning 30 of 34 games while Buffalo dropped into the second division, and missed winning the pennant by a fraction of a percent. In 19 seasons as a minor league skipper, Meyer's clubs won 1,605 and lost 1,325 (.548).

=== Reputation ===
Meyer was known for scrappiness. With Newark, one of his players, Nick Rhabe, threatened the general manager, "If you don't get me more dough, you'll be sorry." Rhabe carried through on the threat by running the bases poorly in a game. Meyer responded by knocking Rhabe down the dugout steps and kicking him off the team. In general, he was a disciplinarian who rarely screamed at players, similar to the style of Joe McCarthy.

Meyer was an avid singer and a fan of George M. Cohan. While in New York, Joe McCarthy introduced Meyer to Cohan. Meyer impressed him by singing songs that Cohan himself had not remembered writing.

=== Bypassed for MLB jobs ===
During his minor league managerial career, Meyer was considered for major league jobs several times. He was a candidate to be manager for the 1938 Cleveland Indians, but lost out to Ossie Vitt, his peer as the skipper of the Yanks' Newark Bears affiliate. Later, he was derailed by the clubs' preference of the time for player–managers, thus saving salary during the Great Depression, or men whose major league résumés were stronger than Meyer's. When the Cubs fired Gabby Hartnett after the 1940 campaign Meyer was considered, but Jimmie Wilson got the job after helping the Cincinnati Reds win the 1940 World Series.

In 1945, Frank E. McKinney, owner of the Indianapolis Indians of the American Association, approached Meyer at the Little World Series in Louisville on behalf of the Indians' parent team, the Boston Braves, about their managerial opening, but the Braves owners, led by Lou Perini, ultimately chose Billy Southworth, winner of three straight NL pennants and two World Series titles from 1942 to 1944 with the St. Louis Cardinals; Southworth would be elected to the Baseball Hall of Fame as a manager in 2008. The parent Yankees, meanwhile, had only one skipper from 1931 through 1945: McCarthy, who won eight American League pennants, seven World Series titles, and 1,438 regular-season games (an average of 96 a season) during that span.

== Major league managerial career ==
=== Health issues ===
After a tumultuous 1946 season, which saw McCarthy quit as the Bombers' skipper in May, Yankees president and co-owner Larry MacPhail offered the 1947 managerial job to Meyer, though Meyer had been seriously ill during 1946, having collapsed during a June game from heat prostration, then been hospitalized for several weeks after suffering a mild heart attack. The hot-tempered, hard-drinking MacPhail also had a reputation for clashing with his managers. Meyer declined MacPhail's offer and instead returned to Kansas City, leading the 1947 Blues to a first-place finish, while the Yankees rebounded to win the 1947 pennant under Bucky Harris.

=== Pittsburgh Pirates ===
The years 1946 and 1947 were also consequential for the Pittsburgh Pirates. Frank McKinney—who had contacted Meyer about interviewing with the Braves after the 1945 season—became the Pirates' majority owner in August 1946. His ownership group, which included entertainer Bing Crosby and real-estate magnate John W. Galbreath, hired a new management team at the close of the 1946 season. As general manager, they selected former Yankees farm system official Roy Hamey. Then they acquired Billy Herman from the Braves and named the future Baseball Hall of Fame second baseman their player–manager for 1947. However the managerial move backfired: the 37-year-old Herman was at the end of the line as a player, appearing in only 18 games and hitting .213, and his Pirates stumbled to the club's second consecutive seventh-place season in the eight-team National League. Herman resigned with one game left in the 1947 campaign.

Hamey, who had worked with Meyer at both Binghamton and Kansas City in the Yankee organization, and McKinney then turned to Meyer, who accepted their offer to become Pittsburgh's pilot for 1948. Meyer received an important endorsement from Joe McCarthy, who had followed Meyer's work closely with future Yankees stars in Oakland, Kansas City and Newark. McCarthy was impressed enough to say Meyer had been the best manager in the minor leagues at the time, and predicted that he would be one of the best in the majors as well. In 1948, in his first season, Pittsburgh rose from seventh place to fourth in the standings—and just 81/2 games out of first. The 21-game improvement to 83–71 earned Meyer The Sporting News Major League Manager of the Year. The Pirates also led the National League in attendance.

Despite the home run heroics of Ralph Kiner, the Pirates dropped to sixth place in 1949. Reportedly, Meyer lost the team when he suggested to reporters a player had run into a pitchout on his own when he had actually given the player a hit and run sign. By 1950 they were back in the cellar. In December 1950, the Pirate ownership replaced Hamey with Branch Rickey, whose solution was to purge the team of high-salaried veterans and bring up young players from the farm system—the same tactic he'd used to rebuild the St. Louis Cardinals and Brooklyn Dodgers. However, it backfired disastrously in Pittsburgh, and Meyer was saddled with what amounted to a minor-league team at the major-league level. The Pirates managed to improve to seventh in 1951, but lost 112 games in 1952—the second-worst record in franchise history, and the third-worst in modern (post-1900) National League history. Meyer resigned at the end of that campaign.

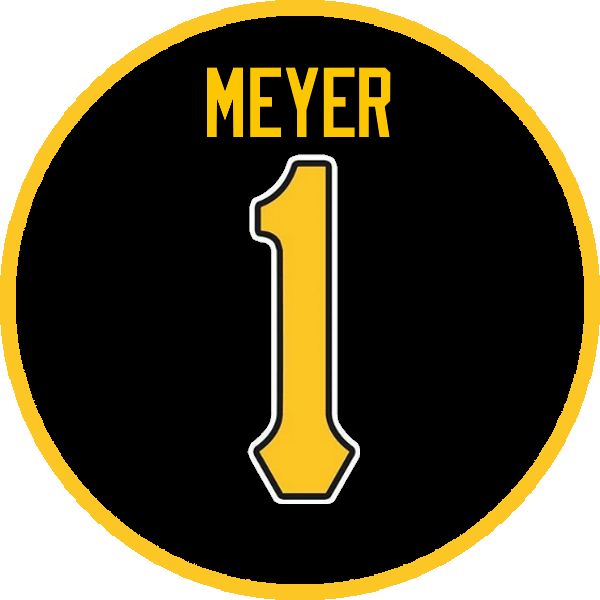
Billy Meyer's number 1 was retired by the Pittsburgh Pirates in 1954.

== Legacy ==
In 1954, the Pirates retired Meyer's uniform number #1. It was only the seventh number retired by a team in AL/NL history, with Meyer the first person who was primarily a manager to have his number retired. Several later historians have remarked on the puzzling circumstances of the number retirement, given that Meyer had a managing record of 317–452 (.412) over only five seasons in Pittsburgh and never finishing higher than fourth in the league. This is a contrast to the vast majority of retired numbers, which recognize either professional accomplishments at the highest level (frequently but not always including membership in the Baseball Hall of Fame), long-term tenure with the same team, significant post-season success, or a personal connection/possible tragedy associated with the franchise.

Meyer also was honored by his native city of Knoxville, where he maintained his home and had married a classmate from grade school, Madelon Warters, in 1932. The city's baseball park, for years the home of the minor-league Knoxville Smokies, was named Bill Meyer Stadium in his honor. The stadium was closed in 1999 and demolished in 2003.

Meyer appears in the Norman Rockwell painting Tough Call.

== Post-managerial career ==
After his managing days, Meyer worked as a scout and troubleshooter for the Pirates until he suffered a stroke in 1955. Meyer died two years later, in Knoxville, of heart and kidney ailments at age 64.

Sporting positions
Preceded by Joe McCarthy	Louisville Colonels manager 1926–1928	Succeeded by Allen Sothoron
Preceded by Ossie Vitt	Oakland Oaks manager 1936–1937	Succeeded by Johnny Vergez
Preceded by Dutch Zwilling; Casey Stengel; Burleigh Grimes	Kansas City Blues manager 1938–1941; 1946; 1947	Succeeded by Johnny Neun; Burleigh Grimes; Dick Bartell
Preceded by Johnny Neun	Newark Bears manager 1942–1945	Succeeded by George Selkirk
