= John Hall (baseball) =

American baseball player (1924-1995)

- Pitcher
- Born: January 9, 1924; Muskogee, Oklahoma, U.S.
- Died: January 17, 1995 (aged 71); Midwest City, Oklahoma, U.S.
- Batted: Right Threw: Right

MLB debut
- April 21, 1948, for the Brooklyn Dodgers

Last MLB appearance
- May 8, 1948, for the Brooklyn Dodgers

MLB statistics
- Record: 0-0
- Earned run average: 6.23
- Strikeouts: 2
- Stats at Baseball Reference

Teams
- Brooklyn Dodgers (1948)

John Sylvester Hall (January 9, 1924 – January 17, 1995) was an American pitcher in Major League Baseball. He pitched in three games for the 1948 Brooklyn Dodgers.
