= Lou Lombardo (baseball) =

American baseball player (1928-2001)

- Pitcher
- Born: November 18, 1928; Carlstadt, New Jersey, U.S.
- Died: June 11, 2001 (aged 72); Fort Mill, South Carolina, U.S.
- Batted: Left Threw: Left

MLB debut
- September 18, 1948, for the New York Giants

Last MLB appearance
- October 3, 1948, for the New York Giants

MLB statistics
- Games pitched: 2
- Earned run average: 6.75
- Innings pitched: 5.1
- Stats at Baseball Reference

Teams
- New York Giants (1948)

Louis Lombardo (November 18, 1928 – June 11, 2001) was an American Major League Baseball pitcher who played in two games for the New York Giants in 1948.
