= Stan Rojek =

American baseball player (1919–1997)

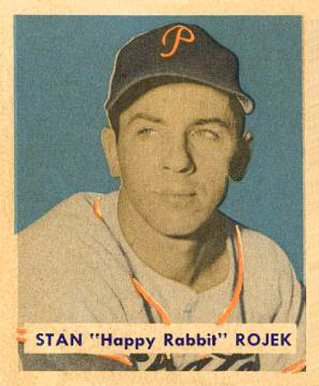
- Shortstop
- Born: April 21, 1919; North Tonawanda, New York, U.S.
- Died: July 9, 1997 (aged 78); North Tonawanda, New York, U.S.
- Batted: Right Threw: Right

MLB debut
- September 22, 1942, for the Brooklyn Dodgers

Last MLB appearance
- May 13, 1953, for the St. Louis Browns

MLB statistics
- Batting average: .266
- Home runs: 4
- Runs batted in: 122
- Stats at Baseball Reference

Teams
- Brooklyn Dodgers (1942, 1946–1947); Pittsburgh Pirates (1948–1951); St. Louis Cardinals (1951); St. Louis Browns (1952)

Stanley Andrew Rojek (April 21, 1919 – July 9, 1997) was an American professional baseball shortstop for the Brooklyn Dodgers (1942 and 1946–47), Pittsburgh Pirates (1948–51), St. Louis Cardinals (1951) and St. Louis Browns (1952) of Major League Baseball.

He helped the Dodgers win the 1947 National League Pennant. He worked in his family's dairy, 'Rojek's Dairy'.

He finished 10th in voting for the 1948 NL MVP for leading the league in Games (156), At Bats (641), Plate Appearances (713) and Singles (150). He also had 85 Runs, 186 Hits, 27 Doubles, 5 Triples, 4 Home Runs, 51 RBI, 24 Stolen Bases, 61 Walks, .290 Batting Average, .355 On-base percentage, .367 Slugging Percentage, 235 Total Bases and 8 Sacrifice Hits.

In 8 seasons he played in 522 Games and had 1,764 At Bats, 225 Runs, 470 Hits, 67 Doubles, 13 Triples, 4 Home Runs, 122 RBI, 32 Stolen Bases, 152 Walks, .266 Batting Average, .327 On-base percentage, .326 Slugging Percentage, 575 Total Bases and 35 Sacrifice Hits. His career fielding percentage was .966.

He lockered next to Jackie Robinson, in Brooklyn, when Jackie broke baseball's colored barrier. Rojek was one of the only players who was kind to Jackie.

Rojek was very poor. When he wasn't playing baseball or helping with his brothers' families, he was driving the family milk truck and working the business. The dairy was called "Rojek's Dairy", and Stan would assist his brother, Theodore, with the milk bottle and cream cheese deliveries.

He died in his hometown at the age of 78. In dedication, he has a baseball field named after him in his hometown, North Tonawanda.
