= 1948 Major League Baseball season =

1948 MLB season
- League: American League (AL); National League (NL)
- Sport: Baseball
- Duration: Regular season: April 19 – October 4, 1948 (AL); April 19 – October 3, 1948 (NL); World Series: October 6–11, 1948
- Games: 154
- Teams: 16 (8 per league)

Regular season
- Season MVP: AL: Lou Boudreau (CLE); NL: Stan Musial (STL)
- AL champions: Cleveland Indians
- AL runners-up: Boston Red Sox
- NL champions: Boston Braves
- NL runners-up: St. Louis Cardinals

World Series
- Champions: Cleveland Indians
- Runners-up: Boston Braves

MLB seasons
- ← 1947 1949 →

Locations of teams for the 1942–1953 American League seasons
American League
Locations of teams for the 1943–1952 National League seasons
National League

The 1948 major league baseball season began on April 19, 1948. The regular season ended on October 4, with the Boston Braves and Cleveland Indians as the regular season champions of the National League and American League, respectively. The Indians won the American League title via a tie-breaker game victory over the Boston Red Sox, after both teams finished their 154-game schedules with identical 96–58 records. This was the second regular season tie-breaker, and saw a change from the previous three-game format to that of a single-game, Game 163. The postseason began with Game 1 of the 45th World Series on October 6 and ended with Game 6 on October 11. The Indians defeated the Braves, four games to two, capturing their second championship in franchise history, since their previous in 1920. Going into the season, the defending World Series champions were the New York Yankees from the 1947 season.

The 15th All-Star Game was held on July 13 at Sportsman's Park in St. Louis, Missouri, hosted by the St. Louis Browns. The American League won, 5–2, for their third straight win.

The 1948 season is notable as being the final season of any Negro league holding major-league status, as per MLB's 2020 designation of Negro leagues. It would be the final season of the Negro National League, while the Negro American League would continue as a minor-league until it ceased play after the 1962 season.

== Schedule ==
The 1948 schedule consisted of 154 games for all teams in the American League and National League, each of which had eight teams. Each team was scheduled to play 22 games against the other seven teams of their respective league. This continued the format put in place since the 1904 season (except for 1919) and would be used until 1961 in the American League and 1962 in the National League.

Opening Day took place on April 19, featuring six teams. The final day of the scheduled regular season was on October 3, which saw all sixteen teams play, continuing the trend from 1946. Due to the Boston Red Sox and Cleveland Indians finishing with the same record of 96–58, a tie-breaker game was scheduled, to be considered an extension of the regular season. The Indians won the Game 163 tie-breaker on October 4. The World Series took place between October 6 and October 11.

== Teams ==
League	Team	City	Ballpark	Capacity	Manager
American League	Boston Red Sox	Boston, Massachusetts	Fenway Park	35,500	Joe McCarthy
American League	Chicago White Sox	Chicago, Illinois	Comiskey Park	47,400	Ted Lyons
American League	Cleveland Indians	Cleveland, Ohio	Cleveland Stadium	78,811	Lou Boudreau
American League	Detroit Tigers	Detroit, Michigan	Briggs Stadium	58,000	Steve O'Neill
American League	New York Yankees	New York, New York	Yankee Stadium	67,000	Bucky Harris
American League	Philadelphia Athletics	Philadelphia, Pennsylvania	Shibe Park	33,166	Connie Mack
American League	St. Louis Browns	St. Louis, Missouri	Sportsman's Park	34,000	Zack Taylor
American League	Washington Senators	Washington, D.C.	Griffith Stadium	28,085	Joe Kuhel
National League	Boston Braves	Boston, Massachusetts	Braves Field	37,106	Billy Southworth
National League	Brooklyn Dodgers	New York, New York	Ebbets Field	34,219	Leo Durocher
National League	Brooklyn Dodgers	New York, New York	Ebbets Field	34,219	Ray Blades
National League	Brooklyn Dodgers	New York, New York	Ebbets Field	34,219	Burt Shotton
National League	Chicago Cubs	Chicago, Illinois	Wrigley Field	38,396	Charlie Grimm
National League	Cincinnati Reds	Cincinnati, Ohio	Crosley Field	30,101	Johnny Neun
National League	Cincinnati Reds	Cincinnati, Ohio	Crosley Field	30,101	Bucky Walters
National League	New York Giants	New York, New York	Polo Grounds	54,500	Mel Ott
National League	New York Giants	New York, New York	Polo Grounds	54,500	Leo Durocher
National League	Philadelphia Phillies	Philadelphia, Pennsylvania	Shibe Park	33,166	Ben Chapman
National League	Philadelphia Phillies	Philadelphia, Pennsylvania	Shibe Park	33,166	Dusty Cooke
National League	Philadelphia Phillies	Philadelphia, Pennsylvania	Shibe Park	33,166	Eddie Sawyer
National League	Pittsburgh Pirates	Pittsburgh, Pennsylvania	Forbes Field	33,730	Billy Meyer
National League	St. Louis Cardinals	St. Louis, Missouri	Sportsman's Park	34,000	Eddie Dyer

== Standings ==
=== American League ===
American League
Team	W	L	Pct.	GB	Home	Road
Cleveland Indians	97	58	.626	—	48‍–‍30	49‍–‍28
Boston Red Sox	96	59	.619	1	55‍–‍23	41‍–‍36
New York Yankees	94	60	.610	2½	50‍–‍27	44‍–‍33
Philadelphia Athletics	84	70	.545	12½	36‍–‍41	48‍–‍29
Detroit Tigers	78	76	.506	18½	39‍–‍38	39‍–‍38
St. Louis Browns	59	94	.386	37	34‍–‍42	25‍–‍52
Washington Senators	56	97	.366	40	29‍–‍48	27‍–‍49
Chicago White Sox	51	101	.336	44½	27‍–‍48	24‍–‍53

=== National League ===
National League
Team	W	L	Pct.	GB	Home	Road
Boston Braves	91	62	.595	—	45‍–‍31	46‍–‍31
St. Louis Cardinals	85	69	.552	6½	44‍–‍33	41‍–‍36
Brooklyn Dodgers	84	70	.545	7½	36‍–‍41	48‍–‍29
Pittsburgh Pirates	83	71	.539	8½	47‍–‍31	36‍–‍40
New York Giants	78	76	.506	13½	37‍–‍40	41‍–‍36
Philadelphia Phillies	66	88	.429	25½	32‍–‍44	34‍–‍44
Cincinnati Reds	64	89	.418	27	32‍–‍45	32‍–‍44
Chicago Cubs	64	90	.416	27½	35‍–‍42	29‍–‍48

- The Cleveland Indians defeated the Boston Red Sox in a one-game regular season extension to earn the American League pennant.

=== Tie games ===
7 tie games (3 in AL, 4 in NL), which are not factored into winning percentage or games behind (and were often replayed again) occurred throughout the season.

==== American League ====
- Chicago White Sox, 2
- Cleveland Indians, 1
- St. Louis Browns, 2
- Washington Senators, 1

==== National League ====
- Boston Braves, 1
- Brooklyn Dodgers, 1
- Chicago Cubs, 1
- New York Giants, 1
- Philadelphia Phillies, 1
- Pittsburgh Pirates, 2
- St. Louis Cardinals, 1

== Postseason ==
The postseason began on October 4 and ended on October 11 with the Cleveland Indians defeating the Boston Braves in the 1948 World Series in six games.

=== Bracket ===
American League playoff			World Series
			AL	Cleveland	4
AL	Cleveland	1	NL	Boston Braves	2
AL	Boston Red Sox	0

== Managerial changes ==
=== Off-season ===
Team	Former Manager	New Manager
Brooklyn Dodgers	Burt Shotton	Leo Durocher
Pittsburgh Pirates	Bill Burwell	Billy Meyer
St. Louis Browns	Muddy Ruel	Zack Taylor
Washington Senators	Ossie Bluege	Joe Kuhel

=== In-season ===
Team	Former Manager	New Manager
Brooklyn Dodgers	Leo Durocher	Ray Blades
Brooklyn Dodgers	Ray Blades	Burt Shotton
Cincinnati Reds	Johnny Neun	Bucky Walters
New York Giants	Mel Ott	Leo Durocher
Philadelphia Phillies	Ben Chapman	Dusty Cooke
Philadelphia Phillies	Dusty Cooke	Eddie Sawyer

== League leaders ==
=== American League ===
Hitting leaders
Stat	Player	Total
AVG	Ted Williams (BOS)	.369
OPS	Ted Williams (BOS)	1.112
HR	Joe DiMaggio (NYY)	39
RBI	Joe DiMaggio (NYY)	155
R	Tommy Henrich (NYY)	138
H	Bob Dillinger (SLB)	207
SB	Bob Dillinger (SLB)	28

Pitching leaders
Stat	Player	Total
W	Hal Newhouser (DET)	21
L	Fred Sanford (SLB)	21
ERA	Gene Bearden (CLE)	2.43
K	Bob Feller (CLE)	164
IP	Bob Lemon (CLE)	293.2
SV	Russ Christopher (CLE)	17
WHIP	Bob Lemon (CLE)	1.226

=== National League ===
Hitting leaders
Stat	Player	Total
AVG	Stan Musial (STL)	.376
OPS	Stan Musial (STL)	1.152
HR	Ralph Kiner (PIT); Johnny Mize (NYG)	40
RBI	Stan Musial (STL)	131
R	Stan Musial (STL)	135
H	Stan Musial (STL)	230
SB	Richie Ashburn (PHI)	32

Pitching leaders
Stat	Player	Total
W	Johnny Sain (BSN)	24
L	Dutch Leonard (PHI)	17
ERA	Harry Brecheen (STL)	2.24
K	Harry Brecheen (STL)	149
IP	Johnny Sain (BSN)	314.2
SV	Harry Gumbert (CIN)	17
WHIP	Harry Brecheen (STL)	1.037

== Milestones ==
=== Batters ===
==== Four home runs in one game ====
- Pat Seerey (CWS/CLE):
  - Became the fifth player to hit four home runs in one game as a part of the Chicago White Sox in a 12–11 win against the Philadelphia Athletics in game one of a doubleheader on July 18.

==== Cycles ====
- Joe DiMaggio (NYY):
  - DiMaggio hit for his second cycle and 11th in franchise history, on May 20 against the Chicago White Sox.
- Wally Westlake (PIT):
  - Westlake hit for his first cycle and 14th in franchise history, on July 30 against the Brooklyn Dodgers.
- Jackie Robinson (BRO):
  - Robinson hit for his first cycle, the sixth in franchise history, and the sixth reverse cycle in major league history, in game one of a doubleheader on August 29 against the St. Louis Cardinals.

==== Other batting accomplishments ====
- George Vico (DET):
  - Becomes the fifth major league player to hit a home run off the first pitch he sees as a major league player against the Chicago White Sox.

=== Pitchers ===
==== No-hitters ====
- Bob Lemon (CLE):
  - Lemon threw his first career no-hitter and ninth no-hitter in franchise history, by defeating the Detroit Tigers 2–0 on June 30. Lemon walked three and struck out four.
- Rex Barney (BRO):
  - Barney threw his first career no-hitter and 10th no-hitter in franchise history, by defeating the New York Giants 2–0 on September 9. Barney walked two and struck out four, throwing 75 strikes on 116 pitches.

== Awards and honors ==
=== Regular season ===
Baseball Writers' Association of America Awards
BBWAA Award	National League	American League
Rookie of the Year	Alvin Dark (BSN)	—
Most Valuable Player	Stan Musial (STL)	Lou Boudreau (CLE)

=== Other awards ===
The Sporting News Awards
Award	National League	American League
Player of the Year	—	Lou Boudreau (CLE)
Pitcher of the Year	Johnny Sain (BSN)	Bob Lemon (CLE)
Rookie of the Year	Richie Ashburn (PHI)	—
Manager of the Year	Billy Meyer (PIT)	—
Executive of the Year	—	Bill Veeck (CLE)

=== Baseball Hall of Fame ===
- Herb Pennock
- Pie Traynor

== Home field attendance ==
Team name	Wins	%±	Home attendance	%±	Per game
Cleveland Indians	97	21.3%	2,620,627	72.2%	33,172
New York Yankees	94	−3.1%	2,373,901	8.9%	30,830
Detroit Tigers	78	−8.2%	1,743,035	24.7%	22,637
Boston Red Sox	96	15.7%	1,558,798	9.2%	19,985
Pittsburgh Pirates	83	33.9%	1,517,021	18.2%	18,963
New York Giants	78	−3.7%	1,459,269	−8.8%	18,952
Boston Braves	91	5.8%	1,455,439	13.9%	19,151
Brooklyn Dodgers	84	−10.6%	1,398,967	−22.6%	17,935
Chicago Cubs	64	−7.2%	1,237,792	−9.3%	15,869
St. Louis Cardinals	85	−4.5%	1,111,440	−10.9%	14,434
Philadelphia Athletics	84	7.7%	945,076	3.7%	12,274
Cincinnati Reds	64	−12.3%	823,386	−8.5%	10,693
Washington Senators	56	−12.5%	795,254	−6.5%	10,196
Chicago White Sox	51	−27.1%	777,844	−11.3%	10,235
Philadelphia Phillies	66	6.5%	767,429	−15.4%	10,098
St. Louis Browns	59	0.0%	335,564	4.7%	4,415

== Retired numbers ==
- Babe Ruth had his No. 3 retired by the New York Yankees on June 13. This was the second number retired by the team.
- Mel Ott had his No. 4 retired by the New York Giants on July 17. This was the second number retired by the team.

== See also ==
- 1948 in baseball (Events, Movies, Births, Deaths)
- 1948 All-American Girls Professional Baseball League season
