= 1947 Brooklyn Dodgers season =

Major League Baseball season

1947 Brooklyn Dodgers
- National League champions
- League: National League
- Ballpark: Ebbets Field
- City: Brooklyn, New York
- Record: 94–60 (.610)
- League place: 1st
- Owners: James & Dearie Mulvey, Walter O'Malley, Branch Rickey, John L. Smith
- President: Branch Rickey
- Managers: Clyde Sukeforth, Burt Shotton
- Radio: WHN; Red Barber, Connie Desmond

The 1947 Brooklyn Dodgers season was the team's 65th season of play overall and its 58th season of play in the National League (NL) of Major League Baseball (MLB). The Dodgers finished in first place in the National League with a record of 94–60, five games ahead of the St. Louis Cardinals. They advanced to the 1947 World Series against the American League champion New York Yankees, but lost the series in seven games. The Dodgers played their home games at Ebbets Field.

On April 15, Jackie Robinson started at first base for the Dodgers, breaking the baseball color line and becoming the first black player in MLB since Moses Fleetwood Walker in the 1880s. Robinson went on to bat .297, score 125 runs, steal 29 bases, and win MLB's inaugural Rookie of the Year award. This season was dramatized in the movie 42.

== Offseason ==
- October 2, 1946: Steve Nagy was purchased from the Dodgers by the Pittsburgh Pirates.
- October 19, 1946: Art Herring was purchased from the Dodgers by the Pittsburgh Pirates.
- December 4, 1946: Augie Galan was traded by the Dodgers to the Cincinnati Reds for Ed Heusser.
- December 5, 1946: Eddie Basinski was traded by the Dodgers to the Pittsburgh Pirates for Al Gerheauser.
- Prior to 1947 season: Marion Fricano was signed as an amateur free agent by the Dodgers.

== Regular season ==
Due to the suspension of Leo Durocher for a year for "conduct detrimental to baseball", coach Clyde Sukeforth managed the first 2 games of the season on an emergency basis, but declined to manage for the full season, so Burt Shotton took over as manager for the rest of the season.

The Dodgers had a home attendance of 1.8 million paying fans, a National League record at the time. On the road, the Dodgers drew 1.9 million paying fans, also a National League record at that time.

=== Season standings ===
National League
| Team | W | L | Pct. | GB | Home | Road |
|---|---|---|---|---|---|---|
| Brooklyn Dodgers | 94 | 60 | .610 | — | 52‍–‍25 | 42‍–‍35 |
| St. Louis Cardinals | 89 | 65 | .578 | 5 | 46‍–‍31 | 43‍–‍34 |
| Boston Braves | 86 | 68 | .558 | 8 | 50‍–‍27 | 36‍–‍41 |
| New York Giants | 81 | 73 | .526 | 13 | 45‍–‍31 | 36‍–‍42 |
| Cincinnati Reds | 73 | 81 | .474 | 21 | 42‍–‍35 | 31‍–‍46 |
| Chicago Cubs | 69 | 85 | .448 | 25 | 36‍–‍43 | 33‍–‍42 |
| Philadelphia Phillies | 62 | 92 | .403 | 32 | 38‍–‍38 | 24‍–‍54 |
| Pittsburgh Pirates | 62 | 92 | .403 | 32 | 32‍–‍45 | 30‍–‍47 |

=== Record vs. opponents ===
1947 National League record Sources:
| Team | BSN | BRO | CHC | CIN | NYG | PHI | PIT | STL |
|---|---|---|---|---|---|---|---|---|
| Boston | — | 12–10 | 13–9 | 13–9 | 13–9 | 14–8 | 12–10 | 9–13 |
| Brooklyn | 10–12 | — | 15–7 | 15–7 | 14–8 | 14–8 | 15–7 | 11–11–1 |
| Chicago | 9–13 | 7–15 | — | 12–10 | 7–15 | 16–6–1 | 8–14 | 10–12 |
| Cincinnati | 9–13 | 7–15 | 10–12 | — | 13–9 | 13–9 | 13–9 | 8–14 |
| New York | 9–13 | 8–14 | 15–7 | 9–13 | — | 12–10 | 15–7–1 | 13–9 |
| Philadelphia | 8–14 | 8–14 | 6–16–1 | 9–13 | 10–12 | — | 13–9 | 8–14 |
| Pittsburgh | 10–12 | 7–15 | 14–8 | 9–13 | 7–15–1 | 9–13 | — | 6–16–1 |
| St. Louis | 13–9 | 11–11–1 | 12–10 | 14–8 | 9–13 | 14–8 | 16–6–1 | — |

=== Game log ===
1947 Game Log: 94-60 (Home: 52-25; Away: 42-34)
April: 8-3 (Home: 8-1; Away: 0-2)

| # | Date | Opponent | Score | Win | Loss | Save | Attendance | Record |
|---|---|---|---|---|---|---|---|---|
| 1 | April 15 | Braves | 5–3 | Gregg (1–0) | Sain (0–1) | Casey (1) | 26,623 | 1–0 |
| 2 | April 17 | Braves | 12–6 | Higbe (1–0) | Cooper (0–1) | Casey (2) | 10,252 | 2–0 |
| 3 | April 18 | @ Giants | 4–10 | Koslo (1–0) | Lombardi (0–1) | | 37,546 | 2–1 |
| 4 | April 19 | @ Giants | 3–4 | Voiselle (1-1) | Branca (0–1) | | 52,355 | 2-2 |
| 5 | April 22 | Phillies | 1–0 | Gregg (2–0) | Leonard (1-1) | | 9,790 | 3–2 |
| 6 | April 23 | Phillies | 5–2 | Hatten (1–0) | Judd (0–2) | | 8,812 | 4–2 |
| 7 | April 24 | Phillies | 2–0 | Branca (1-1) | Hughes (0–2) | Casey (3) | 11,654 | 5–2 |
| 8 | April 26 | Giants | 7–3 | Lombardi (1-1) | Voiselle (1–2) | | 33,565 | 6–2 |
| 9 | April 27 | Giants | 9–8 | Casey (1–0) | Thompson (0–1) | | 31,675 | 7–2 |
| 10 | April 29 | Cubs | 10–6 | Hatten (2–0) | Wyse (1–2) | Casey (4) | 22,030 | 8–2 |
| 11 | April 30 | Cubs | 1–3 | Lade (1–0) | Branca (1–2) | | 20,140 | 8–3 |

May: 12-14 (Home: 5-3; Away: 7-11)

| # | Date | Opponent | Score | Win | Loss | Save | Attendance | Record |
|---|---|---|---|---|---|---|---|---|
| 12 | May 1 | Cubs | 5–2 | Higbe (2–0) | Chipman (2–1) | Chandler (1) | 11,533 | 9–3 |
| 13 | May 6 | Cardinals | 7–6 | Casey (2–0) | Grodzicki (0–1) | | 18,971 | 10–3 |
| 14 | May 7 | Cardinals | 1–2 | Pollet (1–3) | Lombardi (1–2) | | 11,435 | 10–4 |
| 15 | May 8 | Cardinals | 1–5 | Brecheen (3–1) | Branca (1–3) | | 32,328 | 10–5 |
| 16 | May 9 | @ Phillies | 5–6 (11) | Leonard (4–1) | Casey (2–1) | | 22,680 | 10–6 |
| 17 | May 10 | @ Phillies | 4–2 | Hatten (3–0) | Hughes (0–5) | | 15,556 | 11–6 |
| 18 | May 11 | @ Phillies | 3–7 | Leonard (5–1) | Lombardi (1–3) | | -- | 11–7 |
| 19 | May 11 | @ Phillies | 4–5 | Rowe (5–0) | Chandler (0–1) | Heintzelman (1) | 40,952 | 11–8 |
| 20 | May 12 | Braves | 8–3 | Branca (2–3) | Cooper (1–3) | | 19,661 | 12–8 |
| 21 | May 13 | @ Reds | 5–7 | Vander Meer (1-1) | Taylor (0–1) | Gumbert (2) | 27,164 | 12–9 |
| 22 | May 14 | @ Reds | 0–2 | Blackwell (4–2) | Hatten (3–1) | | 6,688 | 12–10 |
| 23 | May 15 | @ Pirates | 3–7 | Bahr (3–1) | Lombardi (1–4) | Bonham (2) | 13,471 | 12–11 |
| 24 | May 16 | @ Pirates | 3–1 | Branca (3-3) | Higbe (2-2) | Casey (5) | 34,184 | 13–11 |
| 25 | May 17 | @ Pirates | 0–4 | Ostermueller (3–1) | Melton (0–1) | | 17,673 | 13–12 |
| 26 | May 18 | @ Cubs | 4–2 | Hatten (4–1) | Schmitz (3-3) | Casey (6) | 46,572 | 14–12 |
| 27 | May 19 | @ Cubs | 7–8 | Erickson (1-1) | Gregg (2–1) | Schmitz (3) | 21,875 | 14–13 |
| 28 | May 21 | @ Cardinals | 4–3 (10) | Casey (3–1) | Brecheen (4–2) | | 16,249 | 15–13 |
| 29 | May 23 | Phillies | 5–4 | Barney (1–0) | Leonard (6–2) | Casey (7) | 33,136 | 16–13 |
| 30 | May 24 | Phillies | 3–4 (10) | Schmidt (1–2) | Casey (3–2) | | 23,442 | 16–14 |
| 31 | May 25 | Phillies | 5–3 | Hatten (5–1) | Hughes (0–6) | | 18,016 | 17–14 |
| 32 | May 27 | @ Giants | 7–3 | Branca (4–3) | Koslo (3–2) | | 51,780 | 18–14 |
| 33 | May 28 | @ Giants | 14–2 | Taylor (1-1) | Jansen (3–1) | | 28,260 | 19–14 |
| 34 | May 29 | @ Giants | 4–5 | Hartung (4–0) | Hatten (5–2) | Trinkle (4) | 24,274 | 19–15 |
| 35 | May 30 | @ Braves | 3–6 | Spahn (8–0) | Barney (1-1) | | -- | 19–16 |
| 36 | May 30 | @ Braves | 0–3 | Barrett (2–3) | Lombardi (1–5) | | 30,535 | 19–17 |
| 37 | May 31 | @ Braves | 5–0 | Branca (5–3) | Lanfranconi (0–1) | | 23,275 | 20–17 |

June: 18-11 (Home: 8-4; Away: 10-7)

| # | Date | Opponent | Score | Win | Loss | Save | Attendance | Record |
|---|---|---|---|---|---|---|---|---|
| 38 | June 1 | Cardinals | 6–1 | Taylor (2–1) | Brecheen (5–3) | | 34,109 | 21–17 |
| 39 | June 2 | Cardinals | 4–5 (10) | Pollet (3–6) | Branca (5–4) | | 17,719 | 21–18 |
| 40 | June 3 | Pirates | 11–6 | Barney (2–1) | Higbe (3–5) | Casey (8) | -- | 22–18 |
| 41 | June 3 | Pirates | 8–7 | Barney (3–1) | Roe (2–3) | | 27,244 | 23–18 |
| 42 | June 4 | Pirates | 9–4 | Branca (6–4) | Singleton (1-1) | | 32,287 | 24–18 |
| 43 | June 5 | Pirates | 3–0 | Taylor (3–1) | Ostermueller (4–2) | | 24,977 | 25–18 |
| 44 | June 6 | Cubs | 6–2 | Hatten (6–2) | Wyse (2–5) | | 31,555 | 26–18 |
| 45 | June 9 | Reds | 6–9 | Gumbert (5–2) | Lombardi (1–6) | Peterson (1) | 32,864 | 26–19 |
| 46 | June 10 | Reds | 1–3 | Blackwell (8–2) | Branca (6–5) | | -- | 26–20 |
| 47 | June 10 | Reds | 6–5 | Branca (7–5) | Lively (0–2) | | 33,045 | 27–20 |
| 48 | June 11 | Reds | 4–5 | Riddle (1–0) | Hatten (6–3) | Gumbert (4) | 18,403 | 27–21 |
| 49 | June 13 | @ Cardinals | 0–3 | Munger (5–1) | Taylor (3–2) | | 25,606 | 27–22 |
| 50 | June 14 | @ Cardinals | 3–5 | Brazle (5–3) | Branca (7–6) | | 9,190 | 27–23 |
| 51 | June 14 | @ Cardinals | 2–12 | Brecheen (8–3) | Barney (3–2) | | 26,005 | 27–24 |
| 52 | June 15 | @ Cardinals | 3–11 | Pollet (4–7) | Hatten (6–4) | | 29,686 | 27–25 |
| 53 | June 16 | @ Cubs | 2–1 | Taylor (4–2) | Lade (4–3) | | 20,097 | 28–25 |
| 54 | June 18 | @ Cubs | 5–3 | Hatten (7–4) | Borowy (7–3) | Casey (9) | 23,313 | 29–25 |
| 55 | June 19 | @ Cubs | 5–1 | Branca (8–6) | Schmitz (4–8) | | 19,932 | 30–25 |
| 56 | June 21 | @ Reds | 6–5 | Casey (4–2) | Gumbert (5–3) | | 11,807 | 31–25 |
| 57 | June 22 | @ Reds | 0–4 | Blackwell (11–2) | Hatten (7–5) | | -- | 31–26 |
| 58 | June 22 | @ Reds | 9–8 | Lombardi (2–6) | Walters (3–4) | Gregg (1) | 31,204 | 32–26 |
| 59 | June 24 | @ Pirates | 4–2 | Branca (9–6) | Ostermueller (5–4) | | 35,331 | 33–26 |
| 60 | June 25 | @ Pirates | 6–2 | Taylor (5–2) | Higbe (4–7) | | 10,313 | 34–26 |
| 61 | June 26 | Braves | 8–6 | Branca (10–6) | Johnson (2–4) | | 33,102 | 35–26 |
| 62 | June 27 | @ Braves | 8–5 | Barney (4–2) | Voiselle (1–5) | Behrman (1) | 35,801 | 36–26 |
| 63 | June 28 | @ Braves | 4–5 | Lanfranconi (1-1) | Behrman (0–3) | | 11,930 | 36–27 |
| 64 | June 29 | @ Giants | 4–3 | Taylor (6–2) | Iott (1-1) | | -- | 37–27 |
| 65 | June 29 | @ Giants | 5–9 | Trinkle (5–1) | Gregg (2-2) | | 52,147 | 37–28 |
| 66 | June 30 | @ Phillies | 7–4 | Barney (5–2) | Rowe (8–3) | Behrman (2) | 28,515 | 38–28 |

July: 25-8 (Home: 14-7; Away: 11-1)

| # | Date | Opponent | Score | Win | Loss | Save | Attendance | Record |
|---|---|---|---|---|---|---|---|---|
| 67 | July 1 | @ Phillies | 3–5 | Schanz (2–1) | King (0–1) | Donnelly (4) | 10,644 | 38–29 |
| 68 | July 2 | Giants | 11–3 | Branca (11–6) | Kennedy (6–4) | | 33,313 | 39–29 |
| 69 | July 3 | Giants | 2–19 | Koslo (8–4) | Gregg (2–3) | | 27,938 | 39–30 |
| 70 | July 4 | Giants | 16–7 (8) | Casey (5–2) | Trinkle (5–2) | Branca (1) | 20,565 | 40–30 |
| 71 | July 4 | Giants | 4–3 | Taylor (7–2) | M. Cooper (3–8) | | 32,332 | 41–30 |
| 72 | July 5 | Braves | 1–4 | Voiselle (3–5) | Lombardi (2–7) | | 20,596 | 41–31 |
| 73 | July 6 | Braves | 4–0 | Branca (12–6) | Barrett (6-6) | | 26,363 | 42–31 |
| – | July 8 | 14th All-Star Game | American League vs. National League (Wrigley Field, Chicago) | | | | | |
| 74 | July 10 | Cubs | 5–3 | Branca (13–6) | Borowy (8–4) | Casey (10) | -- | 43–31 |
| 75 | July 10 | Cubs | 4–3 (10) | Branca (14–6) | Meyer (3–2) | | 35,876 | 44–31 |
| 76 | July 11 | Cubs | 5–0 | Lombardi (3–7) | Passeau (0–2) | | 31,508 | 45–31 |
| 77 | July 12 | Cubs | 7–2 | Hatten (8–5) | Lade (6-6) | | -- | 46–31 |
| 78 | July 12 | Cubs | 6–5 | Casey (6–2) | Borowy (8–5) | | 27,736 | 47–31 |
| 79 | July 13 | Reds | 9–1 | King (1-1) | Peterson (3–7) | | 23,018 | 48–31 |
| 80 | July 14 | Reds | 1–9 | Lively (2-2) | Branca (14–7) | | 29,379 | 48–32 |
| 81 | July 15 | Pirates | 4–12 | Roe (3–7) | Taylor (7–3) | | -- | 48–33 |
| 82 | July 15 | Pirates | 3–9 | Bagby (3-3) | Hatten (8–6) | | 25,594 | 48–34 |
| 83 | July 16 | Pirates | 10–6 | Behrman (1–3) | Bonham (7–3) | Taylor (1) | 27,756 | 49–34 |
| 84 | July 17 | Pirates | 1–7 | Queen (1–0) | King (1–2) | | 9,133 | 49–35 |
| 85 | July 18 | Cardinals | 7–0 | Branca (15–7) | Munger (8–3) | | 32,734 | 50–35 |
| 86 | July 19 | Cardinals | 5–7 | Dickson (5–10) | Lombardi (3–8) | | 15,685 | 50–36 |
| 87 | July 20 | Cardinals | 3–3 | | | | 33,420 | 50–36 |
| 88 | July 21 | Reds | 7–4 | Lombardi (4–8) | Gumbert (7–6) | Behrman (3) | -- | 51–36 |
| 89 | July 21 | Reds | 4–3 | Hatten (9–6) | Peterson (3–8) | | 35,092 | 52–36 |
| 90 | July 22 | @ Reds | 12–1 | Branca (16–7) | Lively (2–4) | | 31,808 | 53–36 |
| 91 | July 23 | @ Reds | 5–2 | Behrman (2–3) | Raffensberger (3–7) | Casey (11) | 12,528 | 54–36 |
| 92 | July 24 | @ Reds | 6–1 | Lombardi (5–8) | Vander Meer (4–8) | | 13,676 | 55–36 |
| 93 | July 25 | @ Pirates | 4–1 | Taylor (8–3) | Queen (1-1) | | 42,014 | 56–36 |
| 94 | July 26 | @ Pirates | 6–4 | Casey (7–2) | Strincevich (1–5) | | 17,606 | 57–36 |
| 95 | July 27 | @ Pirates | 8–4 | Behrman (3-3) | Ostermueller (8–6) | Casey (12) | -- | 58–36 |
| 96 | July 27 | @ Pirates | 11–4 (7) | Gregg (3-3) | Higbe (7–10) | | 42,716 | 59–36 |
| 97 | July 28 | @ Cubs | 4–0 | Hatten (10–6) | Schmitz (5–13) | | 25,052 | 60–36 |
| 98 | July 29 | @ Cardinals | 4–0 | Taylor (9–3) | Dickson (6–11) | | 32,419 | 61–36 |
| 99 | July 30 | @ Cardinals | 11–10 (10) | King (2-2) | Hearn (7–4) | | 31,709 | 62–36 |
| 100 | July 31 | @ Cardinals | 2–1 | Lombardi (6–8) | Pollet (6–9) | | 21,873 | 63–36 |

August: 19-13 (Home: 15-6; Away: 4-7)

| # | Date | Opponent | Score | Win | Loss | Save | Attendance | Record |
|---|---|---|---|---|---|---|---|---|
| 101 | August 1 | @ Cubs | 8–10 | Kush (5–1) | Casey (7–3) | | 24,319 | 63–37 |
| 102 | August 2 | @ Cubs | 7–12 | Erickson (6–4) | Taylor (9–4) | | 34,108 | 63–38 |
| 103 | August 3 | @ Cubs | 0–6 | Schmitz (6–13) | Branca (16–8) | | 41,120 | 63–39 |
| 104 | August 4 | @ Braves | 4–2 (10) | Casey (8–3) | Voiselle (3–11) | | 23,828 | 64–39 |
| 105 | August 5 | @ Braves | 2–4 | Sain (15–7) | Gregg (3–4) | | 20,658 | 64–40 |
| 106 | August 6 | @ Braves | 3–7 | Spahn (14–6) | Hatten (10–7) | | 32,252 | 64–41 |
| 107 | August 7 | @ Braves | 1–3 | Barrett (9–8) | Taylor (9–5) | | 16,971 | 64–42 |
| 108 | August 8 | Phillies | 5–0 | Branca (17–8) | Leonard (12–7) | | 32,170 | 65–42 |
| 109 | August 9 | Phillies | 3–5 | Rowe (10–8) | Lombardi (6–9) | Jurisich (1) | 23,095 | 65–43 |
| 110 | August 10 | Phillies | 2–0 | Hatten (11–7) | Donnelly (1–4) | | 24,830 | 66–43 |
| 111 | August 12 | Braves | 2–9 | Voiselle (4–11) | Branca (17–9) | Shoun (1) | 38,794 | 66–44 |
| 112 | August 13 | Braves | 10–5 | King (3–2) | Johnson (3–7) | | 25,684 | 67–44 |
| 113 | August 14 | Braves | 1–0 | Lombardi (7–9) | Spahn (14–8) | | 18,571 | 68–44 |
| 114 | August 15 | @ Phillies | 8–1 | Hatten (12–7) | Rowe (10–9) | | 26,060 | 69–44 |
| 115 | August 16 | @ Phillies | 5–4 | Casey (9–3) | Judd (1–12) | Behrman (4) | 9,859 | 70–44 |
| 116 | August 17 | @ Phillies | 0–4 | Leonard (14–7) | King (3-3) | | -- | 70–45 |
| 117 | August 17 | @ Phillies | 7–5 | Casey (10–3) | Jurisich (1–5) | Lombardi (1) | 32,220 | 71–45 |
| 118 | August 18 | Cardinals | 7–5 | Lombardi (8–9) | Pollet (7–11) | Casey (13) | 32,781 | 72–45 |
| 119 | August 18 | Cardinals | 12–3 | Taylor (10–5) | Brecheen (14–7) | Lombardi (2) | 33,723 | 73–45 |
| 120 | August 19 | Cardinals | 3–11 | Brazle (10–6) | Behrman (3–4) | Hearn (1) | 33,465 | 73–46 |
| 121 | August 20 | Cardinals | 2–3 (12) | Pollet (8–11) | Casey (10–4) | Munger (3) | 25,762 | 73–47 |
| 122 | August 21 | Reds | 8–1 | King (4–3) | Blackwell (19–6) | | 14,577 | 74–47 |
| 123 | August 22 | Reds | 6–5 (12) | Behrman (4-4) | Gumbert (8-8) | | 14,836 | 75–47 |
| 124 | August 23 | Reds | 8–5 | Lombardi (9-9) | Vander Meer (6–13) | | 30,041 | 76–47 |
| 125 | August 24 | Pirates | 3–1 | Branca (18–9) | Bonham (9–7) | Casey (14) | 33,207 | 77–47 |
| 126 | August 25 | Pirates | 11–10 | King (5–3) | Higbe (10–13) | Casey (15) | 20,166 | 78–47 |
| 127 | August 26 | Pirates | 3–16 | Ostermueller (12–7) | Gregg (3–5) | | 24,069 | 78–48 |
| 128 | August 27 | Cubs | 3–6 | Schmitz (9–16) | Hatten (12–8) | | 13,117 | 78–49 |
| 129 | August 28 | Cubs | 6–2 | Lombardi (10–9) | Wyse (5–8) | Behrman (5) | 22,375 | 79–49 |
| 130 | August 29 | Giants | 6–3 | Branca (19–9) | Koslo (14–9) | | 34,568 | 80–49 |
| 131 | August 30 | Giants | 3–1 | King (6–3) | Trinkle (6–4) | Casey (16) | 37,512 | 81–49 |
| 132 | August 31 | Giants | 10–4 | Behrman (5–4) | Kennedy (9–11) | Lombardi (3) | 33,837 | 82–49 |

September: 12-11 (Home: 2-4; Away: 10-7)

| # | Date | Opponent | Score | Win | Loss | Save | Attendance | Record |
|---|---|---|---|---|---|---|---|---|
| 133 | September 1 | Phillies | 5–0 | Hatten (13–8) | Hughes (4–10) | | 28,153 | 83–49 |
| 134 | September 1 | Phillies | 0–5 | Judd (3–13) | Branca (19–10) | | 35,468 | 83–50 |
| 135 | September 4 | @ Giants | 2–0 | Lombardi (11–9) | Hansen (0–4) | | 49,203 | 84–50 |
| 136 | September 5 | @ Giants | 7–6 | Haugstad (1–0) | Jansen (17–5) | Casey (17) | 23,475 | 85–50 |
| 137 | September 6 | @ Giants | 2–3 | Poat (3–0) | Branca (19–11) | | 43,085 | 85–51 |
| 138 | September 7 | @ Giants | 6–7 | Koslo (15–9) | King (6–4) | Trinkle (9) | 50,638 | 85–52 |
| 139 | September 9 | @ Cubs | 3–4 | Schmitz (10–17) | Lombardi (11–10) | Erickson (1) | 25,988 | 85–53 |
| 140 | September 10 | @ Cubs | 5–1 | Hatten (14–8) | Chipman (6–5) | Casey (18) | 21,594 | 86–53 |
| 141 | September 11 | @ Cardinals | 4–3 | Branca (20–11) | Brecheen (15–10) | Behrman (6) | 20,452 | 87–53 |
| 142 | September 12 | @ Cardinals | 7–8 | Wilks (4–0) | Behrman (5-5) | | 31,957 | 87–54 |
| 143 | September 13 | @ Cardinals | 8–7 | Lombardi (12–10) | Dickson (12–14) | Behrman (7) | 33,510 | 88–54 |
| 144 | September 14 | @ Reds | 13–2 | Hatten (15–8) | Peterson (5–13) | | -- | 89–54 |
| 145 | September 14 | @ Reds | 6–3 | Hatten (16–8) | Gumbert (10–9) | | 34,623 | 90–54 |
| 146 | September 16 | @ Reds | 7–3 | Branca (21–11) | Walters (8-8) | | 8,261 | 91–54 |
| 147 | September 17 | @ Pirates | 4–2 | Gregg (4–5) | Ostermueller (12–9) | Behrman (8) | 33,916 | 92–54 |
| 148 | September 18 | @ Pirates | 7–8 | Higbe (13–15) | King (6–5) | | 15,440 | 92–55 |
| 149 | September 20 | Braves | 1–8 | Sain (20–11) | Lombardi (12–11) | | 29,762 | 92–56 |
| 150 | September 21 | Braves | 0–4 | Spahn (20–10) | Branca (21–12) | | 34,128 | 92–57 |
| 151 | September 23 | Giants | 6–1 | Hatten (17–8) | Jones (1–2) | Bankhead (1) | 26,123 | 93–57 |
| 152 | September 24 | Giants | 5–6 | Beggs (3–5) | Ramsdell (0–1) | Trinkle (10) | 16,990 | 93–58 |
| 153 | September 25 | @ Phillies | 5–2 (10) | Ramsdell (1-1) | Leonard (17–12) | | 22,736 | 94–58 |
| 154 | September 27 | @ Braves | 1–2 | Martin (1–0) | Palica (0–1) | | 7,720 | 94–59 |
| 155 | September 28 | @ Braves | 2–3 | Sain (21–12) | Banta (0–1) | | 25,511 | 94–60 |

=== Opening Day lineup ===
| Name | Position |
|---|---|
| Eddie Stanky | Second baseman |
| Jackie Robinson | First baseman |
| Pete Reiser | Center fielder |
| Dixie Walker | Right fielder |
| Gene Hermanski | Left fielder |
| Bruce Edwards | Catcher |
| Spider Jorgensen | Third baseman |
| Pee Wee Reese | Shortstop |
| Joe Hatten | Starting pitcher |

=== Season summary ===
==== April ====
On Opening Day, Jackie Robinson made his debut as the Dodgers' first baseman. He went 0-for-3, scoring a run. He also had one sacrifice hit and grounded into a double play before being replaced late in the game by Howie Schultz. In the field, he had 11 putouts without an error. During a game against the Philadelphia Phillies on April 22, Robinson committed an error for the first time in his major league career.

==== May ====
On May 13, Robinson played in his first game in Cincinnati. The Reds won the game 7–5. Despite the loss, Robinson had a walk, a single, and a run. Various racial slurs were hurled at Robinson by the fans. Pee Wee Reese put his hand on Robinson's shoulder to hush the crowd. 46,572 paying fans (while there were 20,000 fans outside) on May 18 came to Chicago's Wrigley Field to see Robinson play against the Cubs. The Dodgers won by a score of 4–2.

==== June ====
Against the Pirates on June 24, Robinson stole home plate for the first time in his career. The Pirates catcher was Dixie Howell, who had started the season in Brooklyn's farm system.

==== July ====
The Dodgers had five players selected to the All-Star Game: Dixie Walker, Ralph Branca, Bruce Edwards, Eddie Stanky, and Pee Wee Reese.

==== August ====
On August 20, St. Louis Cardinals right fielder Enos Slaughter stepped on Robinson's foot and it got injured. He fell down to the ground and all of his teammates stood up for him and shouted back at the Cardinals.

==== September ====
On September 11, Cardinals catcher Joe Garagiola and Robinson were involved in an incident at home plate. Garagiola stepped on Robinson's foot and the two started arguing. Umpire Beans Reardon held back Garagiola while Robinson clapped. The incident was later part of a children's book titled In the Year of the Boar and Jackie Robinson by Bette Bao Lord. Against the Pittsburgh Pirates on September 17, Robinson hit a home run off Fritz Ostermueller. That day, the Dodgers won the NL Pennant, sending them to the World Series.

=== Notable transactions ===
- May 3, 1947: Kirby Higbe, Hank Behrman, Cal McLish, Gene Mauch and Dixie Howell were traded by the Dodgers to the Pittsburgh Pirates for Al Gionfriddo and cash.
- May 10, 1947: Howie Schultz was purchased from the Dodgers by the Philadelphia Phillies.
- May 13, 1947: Tommy Tatum was purchased from the Dodgers by the Cincinnati Reds.

=== Roster ===
1947 Brooklyn Dodgers
Roster
| Pitchers: 23 Dan Bankhead; 11 Jack Banta; 26 Rex Barney; 29 Hank Behrman; 13,20 Ralph Branca; 25 Hugh Casey; 39 Ed Chandler; 23 George Dockins; 8,28 Hal Gregg; 19 Joe Hatten; 20 Phil Haugstad; 13 Kirby Higbe; 16,21 Clyde King; 18 Vic Lombardi; 37 Rube Melton; 40 Erv Palica; 32 Willie Ramsdell; 41 Harry Taylor; 43 Johnny Van Cuyk | Catchers: 24 Bobby Bragan; 10 Bruce Edwards; 14 Gil Hodges; Infielders: 33 Tommy Brown; 21 Spider Jorgensen; 5 Cookie Lavagetto; 34 Eddie Miksis; 1 Pee Wee Reese; 42 Lew Riggs; 3 Stan Rojek; 8 Howie Schultz; 12 Eddie Stanky; 36 Ed Stevens | Outfielders: 6 Carl Furillo; 30 Al Gionfriddo; 22 Gene Hermanski; 17,40 Don Lund; 35 Marv Rackley; 7 Pete Reiser; 4 Duke Snider; 17 Tommy Tatum; 9 Arky Vaughan; 11 Dixie Walker; 14 Dick Whitman | Manager: -- Burt Shotton; 40 Clyde Sukeforth; Coaches: 16,27 Ray Blades; 31 Jake Pitler; 40,15 Clyde Sukeforth |

== Player stats ==
=== Batting ===
==== Starters by position ====
Note: Pos = Position; G = Games played; AB = At bats; H = Hits; Avg. = Batting average; HR = Home runs; RBI = Runs batted in

| Pos | Player | G | AB | H | Avg. | HR | RBI |
|---|---|---|---|---|---|---|---|
| C | Bruce Edwards | 130 | 471 | 139 | .295 | 9 | 80 |
| 1B | Jackie Robinson | 151 | 590 | 175 | .297 | 12 | 48 |
| 2B | Eddie Stanky | 146 | 559 | 141 | .252 | 3 | 53 |
| 3B | Spider Jorgensen | 129 | 441 | 121 | .274 | 5 | 67 |
| SS | Pee Wee Reese | 142 | 476 | 135 | .284 | 12 | 73 |
| OF | Dixie Walker | 148 | 529 | 162 | .306 | 9 | 94 |
| OF | Pete Reiser | 110 | 388 | 120 | .309 | 5 | 46 |
| OF | Carl Furillo | 124 | 437 | 129 | .295 | 8 | 88 |

==== Other batters ====
Note: G = Games played; AB = At bats; H = Hits; Avg. = Batting average; HR = Home runs; RBI = Runs batted in

| Player | G | AB | H | Avg. | HR | RBI |
|---|---|---|---|---|---|---|
| Gene Hermanski | 79 | 189 | 52 | .275 | 7 | 39 |
| Arky Vaughan | 64 | 126 | 41 | .325 | 2 | 25 |
| Eddie Miksis | 45 | 86 | 23 | .267 | 4 | 10 |
| Duke Snider | 40 | 83 | 20 | .241 | 0 | 5 |
| Stan Rojek | 32 | 80 | 21 | .263 | 0 | 7 |
| Gil Hodges | 28 | 77 | 12 | .156 | 1 | 7 |
| Cookie Lavagetto | 41 | 69 | 18 | .261 | 3 | 11 |
| Al Gionfriddo | 37 | 62 | 11 | .177 | 0 | 6 |
| Bobby Bragan | 25 | 36 | 7 | .194 | 0 | 3 |
| Tommy Brown | 15 | 34 | 8 | .235 | 0 | 2 |
| Don Lund | 11 | 20 | 6 | .300 | 2 | 5 |
| Ed Stevens | 5 | 13 | 2 | .154 | 0 | 0 |
| Dick Whitman | 4 | 10 | 4 | .400 | 0 | 2 |
| Marv Rackley | 18 | 9 | 2 | .222 | 0 | 2 |
| Tommy Tatum | 4 | 6 | 0 | .000 | 0 | 0 |
| Howie Schultz | 2 | 1 | 0 | .000 | 0 | 0 |

=== Pitching ===
==== Starting pitchers ====
Note: G = Games pitched; IP = Innings pitched; W = Wins; L = Losses; ERA = Earned run average; SO = Strikeouts

| Player | G | IP | W | L | ERA | SO |
|---|---|---|---|---|---|---|
| Ralph Branca | 43 | 280.0 | 21 | 12 | 2.67 | 148 |
| Joe Hatten | 42 | 225.1 | 17 | 8 | 3.63 | 76 |
| Kirby Higbe | 4 | 15.2 | 2 | 0 | 5.17 | 10 |

==== Other pitchers ====
Note: G = Games pitched; IP = Innings pitched; W = Wins; L = Losses; ERA = Earned run average; SO = Strikeouts

| Player | G | IP | W | L | ERA | SO |
|---|---|---|---|---|---|---|
| Vic Lombardi | 33 | 174.2 | 12 | 11 | 2.99 | 72 |
| Harry Taylor | 33 | 162.0 | 10 | 5 | 3.11 | 58 |
| Hal Gregg | 37 | 104.1 | 4 | 5 | 5.87 | 59 |
| Clyde King | 29 | 87.2 | 6 | 5 | 2.77 | 31 |
| Rex Barney | 28 | 77.2 | 5 | 2 | 4.75 | 36 |
| Jack Banta | 3 | 7.2 | 0 | 1 | 7.04 | 3 |
| Rube Melton | 4 | 4.2 | 0 | 1 | 13.50 | 1 |

==== Relief pitchers ====
Note: G = Games pitched; W = Wins; L = Losses; SV = Saves; ERA = Earned run average; SO = Strikeouts

| Player | G | W | L | SV | ERA | SO |
|---|---|---|---|---|---|---|
| Hugh Casey | 46 | 10 | 4 | 18 | 3.99 | 40 |
| Hank Behrman | 38 | 5 | 3 | 8 | 5.30 | 31 |
| Ed Chandler | 15 | 0 | 1 | 1 | 6.37 | 8 |
| Phil Haugstad | 6 | 1 | 0 | 0 | 2.84 | 4 |
| Dan Bankhead | 4 | 0 | 0 | 1 | 7.20 | 6 |
| George Dockins | 4 | 0 | 0 | 0 | 11.81 | 1 |
| Erv Palica | 3 | 0 | 1 | 0 | 3.00 | 1 |
| Willie Ramsdell | 2 | 1 | 1 | 0 | 6.75 | 3 |
| Johnny Van Cuyk | 2 | 0 | 0 | 0 | 5.40 | 2 |

== Postseason ==
=== Game log ===
Legend
| | Dodgers win |
| | Dodgers loss |
| **Bold** | Dodgers team member |

1947 Postseason Game Log: 3–4 (Home: 2–1; Away: 1–3)
World Series: 3–4 (Home: 2–1; Away: 1–3)

| # | Date | Opponent | Score | Win | Loss | Save | Attendance | Record | Streak |
|---|---|---|---|---|---|---|---|---|---|
| 1 | September 30 | @ Yankees | L 3–5 | Shea (1–0) | **Branca** (0–1) | Page (1) | 73,365 | 0–1 | L1 |
| 2 | October 1 | @ Yankees | L 3–10 | Reynolds (1–0) | **Lombardi** (0–1) | – | 69,865 | 0–2 | L2 |
| 3 | October 2 | Yankees | **W** 9–8 | **Casey** (1–0) | Newsom (0–1) | – | 33,098 | 1–2 | W1 |
| 4 | October 3 | Yankees | **W** 3–2 | **Casey** (2–0) | Bevens (0–1) | – | 33,443 | 2–2 | W2 |
| 5 | October 4 | Yankees | L 1–2 | Shea (2–0) | **Barney** (0–1) | – | 34,379 | 2–3 | L1 |
| 6 | October 5 | @ Yankees | **W** 8–6 | **Branca** (1–1) | Page (0–1) | **Casey** (1) | 74,065 | 3–3 | W1 |
| 7 | October 6 | @ Yankees | L 2–5 | Page (1–1) | **Gregg** (0–1) | – | 71,548 | 3–4 | L1 |

=== Postseason rosters ===
Playoff rosters
World Series

- Pitchers: 23 Dan Bankhead 11 Jack Banta 26 Rex Barney 20 Ralph Branca 25 Hugh Casey 28 Hal Gregg 19 Joe Hatten 20 Phil Haugstad 21 Clyde King 18 Vic Lombardi 40 Erv Palica 32 Willie Ramsdell 41 Harry Taylor 43 Johnny Van Cuyk
- Catchers: 24 Bobby Bragan 10 Bruce Edwards 14 Gil Hodges
- Infielders: 21 Spider Jorgensen 5 Cookie Lavagetto 1 Pee Wee Reese 42 Jackie Robinson 12 Eddie Stanky
- Outfielders: 6 Carl Furillo 22 Gene Hermanski 7 Pete Reiser 4 Duke Snider 11 Dixie Walker 30 Al Gionfriddo

== Awards and honors ==
- 1947 Major League Baseball All-Star Game
  - Dixie Walker starter
  - Ralph Branca reserve
  - Bruce Edwards reserve
  - Pee Wee Reese reserve
  - Eddie Stanky reserve
- Rookie of the Year Award
  - Jackie Robinson
- TSN Major League Executive of the Year
  - Branch Rickey
- TSN Major League All-Star Team
  - Ralph Branca
- TSN Rookie of the Year Award
  - Jackie Robinson

== Farm system ==
| Level | Team | League | Manager |
|---|---|---|---|
| AAA | Montreal Royals | International League | Clay Hopper |
| AAA | St. Paul Saints | American Association | Herman Franks; Curt Davis |
| AA | Ft. Worth Cats | Texas League | Les Burge |
| AA | Mobile Bears | Southern Association | Alfred Todd |
| A | Greenville Spinners | South Atlantic League | Frenchy Bordagaray; Pepper Martin |
| A | Pueblo Dodgers | Western League | Walter Alston |
| B | Asheville Tourists | Tri-State League | William Sayles |
| B | Danville Dodgers | Illinois–Indiana–Iowa League | Paul Chervinko |
| B | Nashua Dodgers | New England League | John Dantonio |
| B | Newport News Dodgers | Piedmont League | John Fitzpatrick |
| B | Spokane Indians | Western International League | Ben Geraghty |
| C | Abilene Blue Sox | West Texas–New Mexico League | Art Bowland; Hayden Greer |
| C | Greenwood Dodgers | Cotton States League | Jim Bivin |
| C | Johnstown Johnnies | Middle Atlantic League | Jay Kirke, Jr. |
| C | Santa Barbara Dodgers | California League | Ray Hathaway |
| D | Trois-Rivières Royals | Canadian–American League | Lou Rochelli |
| D | Cambridge Dodgers | Eastern Shore League | Roy Nichols |
| D | Kingston Dodgers | North Atlantic League | George Scherger |
| D | Olean Oilers | Pennsylvania–Ontario–New York League | Greg Mulleavy |
| D | Ponca City Dodgers | Kansas–Oklahoma–Missouri League | Boyd Bartley |
| D | Pulaski Counts | Appalachian League | Larry Kinzer |
| D | Valdosta Dodgers | Georgia–Florida League | Hugh Holliday |
| D | Zanesville Dodgers | Ohio–Indiana League | Clay Bryant |

LEAGUE CHAMPIONS: Mobile, Pueblo, Nashua, Spokane, Greenwood, Zanesville
