= 1946 National League tie-breaker series =

1946 best-of-three tie-breaker series in Major League Baseball

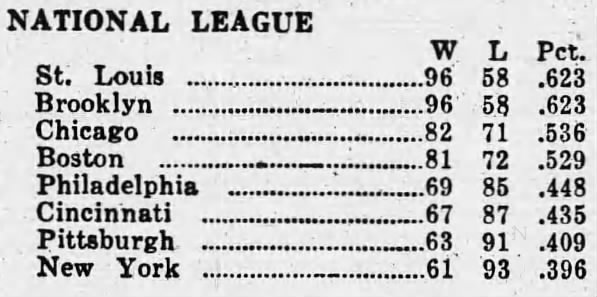
- Standings at the end of the 154-game schedule
Team (Wins)	Manager(s)	Season
St. Louis Cardinals (2)	Eddie Dyer	96–58 (.623)
Brooklyn Dodgers (0)	Leo Durocher	96–58 (.623)
- Dates: October 1–3, 1946
- Venue: Sportsman's Park (St. Louis); Ebbets Field (Brooklyn)
- Umpires: Dusty Boggess, Larry Goetz, Babe Pinelli, Beans Reardon
- Hall of Famers: Cardinals: Stan Musial; Red Schoendienst; Enos Slaughter; Dodgers: Billy Herman; Joe Medwick; Pee Wee Reese

The 1946 National League tie-breaker series was a best-of-three playoff series that extended the 1946 regular season to decide the winner of the National League pennant. The games were played on October 1 and October 3, 1946, between the St. Louis Cardinals and Brooklyn Dodgers. It was necessary after both teams finished their 154-game schedules atop the National League with identical win–loss records of 96–58. This was the first ever tie-breaker series in major-league history. The Cardinals had won 16 of the 24 the regular-season games between the two teams.

The first game took place at Sportsman's Park in St. Louis, and the second, at Brooklyn's Ebbets Field. The Cardinals swept the Dodgers behind wins from pitchers Howie Pollet and Murry Dickson, thus advancing to the 1946 World Series in which they defeated the Boston Red Sox, four games to three. In baseball statistics, the tie-breaker series counted as the 155th and 156th regular season games by both teams, with all events in the games added to regular season statistics.

== Background ==
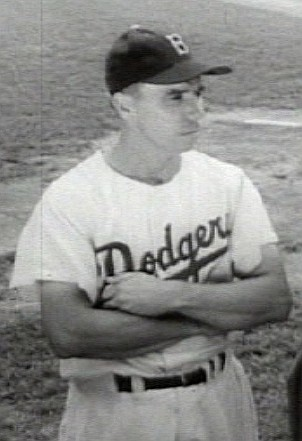
Shortstop Pee Wee Reese batted cleanup for the 1946 Dodgers.

In the first season of baseball since the conclusion of World War II, all ballplayers who had served in the military were returning to their former teams. The Cardinals regained Hall of Famer Stan Musial, and the Dodgers reacquired Hall of Famer Pee Wee Reese. The previous season, St. Louis finished second in the NL, and Brooklyn ended the season third, with records of 95–59 and 87–67, respectively. In a pre-season poll of 119 sportswriters, 115 picked the Cardinals to win the National League, while none selected the Dodgers.

Cardinals manager Eddie Dyer said that talk about his team being a "shoo-in" to win the pennant was devised by Dodgers general manager Branch Rickey to ease the pressure on them, and increase pressure on the Cardinals, noting that he felt Brooklyn was the clear favorite. The Dodgers spent the first month of the season creating a "youth movement" on their club, allowing younger players to have significant playing time. When the team was in first place in the middle of May, however, manager Leo Durocher dropped the idea and instead focused on winning the pennant. Dyer said at the start of the season that as long as St. Louis was within five games of first place on July 4, they would win the pennant race. As July 4 came and went, they found themselves seven games behind the Dodgers, and concern grew in St. Louis.

The Cardinals rebounded, and on August 22, after winning both games of a doubleheader against the Philadelphia Phillies, the clubs were tied, 71–45. After the Dodgers had led the league most of the season, the Cardinals were in first place most of September. On September 29, St. Louis and Brooklyn were again tied with just one game left to play against the Chicago Cubs and Boston Braves, respectively. The Cardinals lost to the Cubs, 8–3, while the Dodgers lost to the Braves, 4–0, and as a result the two teams were placed in a best-of-three tiebreaker series to determine who would face the Boston Red Sox in the 1946 World Series. The Dodgers chose Ralph Branca to pitch the first game in the series. The Cardinals debated starting either Howie Pollet or Murry Dickson, before deciding on Pollet.

== Game 1 summary ==
Team	1	2	3	4	5	6	7	8	9	R	H	E
Brooklyn	0	0	1	0	0	0	1	0	0	2	8	0
St. Louis	1	0	2	0	0	0	1	0	X	4	12	1
WP: Howie Pollet (21–10) LP: Ralph Branca (3–1); Home runs: BRO: Howie Schultz (3); STL: None; Attendance: 26,012; Umpires: Beans Reardon (HP), Babe Pinelli (1B), Larry Goetz (2B), Dusty Boggess (3B); Boxscore

Pollet started the game by retiring the first three Brooklyn hitters. Eddie Stanky grounded out, Cookie Lavagetto flied out to center field, and Joe Medwick grounded out to end the inning. Branca took the mound in the bottom of the first, striking out Red Schoendienst and allowing a single to Terry Moore. After National League MVP Musial struck out, Enos Slaughter singled and Whitey Kurowski walked to load the bases. Joe Garagiola brought in a run before being tagged out to end the inning with the score 1–0. In the second inning, Carl Furillo reached base on an error by Pollet. Pee Wee Reese singled, but Furillo was out at second. Another groundout brought the Cardinals back up, and the Dodgers got all three batters quickly out to end the inning. In the top of the third, Howie Schultz hit a home run on the first pitch, tying the score at 1–1. After three more outs, St. Louis came back up to bat. Moore flied out, then Musial walked, and Slaughter singled. Musial scored on Kurowski's hit while Slaughter was called out, and after two more singles, the latter bringing in Kurowski, Branca was taken out of the game.

Kirby Higbe replaced Branca on the mound, and ended the inning with the Cardinals in the lead, 3–1. Both teams combined for one hit in the fourth inning, a single by Moore. In the top of the fifth, Reese and Bruce Edwards singled, and Schultz grounded out on a bunt. Stan Rojek pinch hit for Higbe, and walked, loading the bases. Stanky grounded into a double play, ending the inning without the Dodgers scoring any runs. In the bottom of the fifth, Hal Gregg replaced Higbe on the mound, and retired the side in order. The sixth inning contained just one baserunner — Schoendienst — who was stranded on first after hitting a single.

The top of the seventh started with Furillo flying out to right field. Reese, Edwards, and Schultz all singled after Furillo's out. Reese scored on Schultz's hit, but Slaughter threw Edwards out at third base A groundout by Bob Ramazzotti ended the threat with the Cardinals leading, 3–2. Dyer later said he considered this play the one that saved the game for St. Louis. In the bottom of the seventh, the Dodgers inserted their fourth pitcher, Vic Lombardi. After Musial tripled and Slaughter flied out, he was replaced by Rube Melton, the fifth and final pitcher the Dodgers used. A Garagiola single scored Musial, and Melton got the other two outs in between a wild pitch, making the score 4–2 at the end of the seventh. Stanky walked to start the eighth, giving him a league-leading 137 walks for the season. Brooklyn finished the eighth inning leaving two on base, and the Cardinals failed to score in the bottom of the eighth as well, leaving a man on base. In the top of the ninth, Reese and Edwards flied out, and Schultz struck out to end the game, giving the Cardinals a 4–2 victory.

== Game 2 summary ==
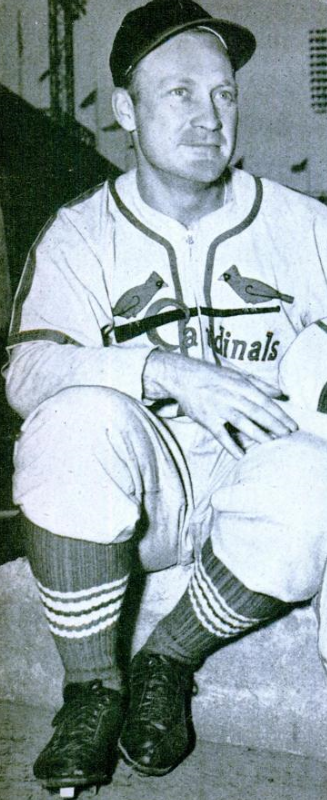
Third baseman Whitey Kurowski batted predominantly fourth or fifth for the Cardinals in 1946.

Team	1	2	3	4	5	6	7	8	9	R	H	E
St. Louis	0	2	0	0	3	0	1	2	0	8	13	0
Brooklyn	1	0	0	0	0	0	0	0	3	4	6	0
WP: Murry Dickson (15–6) LP: Joe Hatten (14–11) Sv: Harry Brecheen (3); Attendance: 31,437; Umpires: Babe Pinelli (HP), Larry Goetz (1B), Dusty Boggess (2B), Beans Reardon (3B), Boxscore

Originally, the Cardinals were wavering between starting Murry Dickson or Harry Brecheen in game two, while the Dodgers were looking to use either Higbe, who had pitched in the previous game, or Joe Hatten; the two clubs went with Dickson and Hatten. Hatten began the game in the top of the first inning by only allowing one hit to Terry Moore. In the bottom of the first, the Dodgers scored the game's first run. After Eddie Stanky struck out, and Dick Whitman flied out, Augie Galan singled. He was brought home by a walk and another single. After Carl Furillo flied out, the first inning ended with a score of 1–0. In the top of the second, the Cardinals responded when Erv Dusak tripled after a Slaughter ground out. Marty Marion hit a sacrifice fly to score Dusak, and after a single by Clyde Kluttz, Dickson tripled to score another run, giving St. Louis a 2–1 lead, before a fly out ended their half of the inning. Dickson walked Bruce Edwards, but retired the next three batters, leaving the score 2–1 at the end of the second inning.

Neither team got a hit in the third or fourth innings. The only runners to reach base were Whitey Kurowski and Marion, both on walks. The fifth started that the same way, with Slaughter and Moore flying out. With two outs however, the Cardinals started hitting. Musial doubled, Kurowski walked, Slaughter tripled, and Dusak singled. All but Dusak scored on the hits, bringing the score to 5–1 and ending Hatten's day. Hank Behrman came on in relief. Behrman kept any more runs from scoring, and after another inning in which the Dodgers did not record a hit, the score was 5–1 at the end of the fifth.

Vic Lombardi replaced Behrman in the top of the sixth. He allowed just one hit to Dickson, keeping the score 5–1 when Brooklyn came up to bat. Whitman, Galan, and Dixie Walker all grounded out to end the inning. In the top of the seventh, Lombardi allowed two walks, then Dusak hit a sacrifice bunt, after which Lombardi was replaced by Higbe. Marion hit a sacrifice bunt as well, which allowed Kurowski to score. Higbe quickly got the third out, and the Dodgers again went hitless in the seventh, making the score 6–1 at the end of seven innings. In the top of the eighth, Dickson struck out, while Red Schoendienst singled and Moore doubled. Musial was intentionally walked to load the bases, and Kurowski singled, allowing two baserunners to score and making the game 8–1 in favor of the Cardinals. After another walk, Higbe was replaced on the pitcher's mound by Rube Melton, who got the final two outs of the inning.

Brooklyn went hitless in the bottom of the eighth. They inserted Harry Taylor to pitch the top half of the ninth, in which, he held St. Louis hitless. With half an inning left to play, the Dodgers began to get hits off of Dickson. Galan doubled, and after Walker flied out, Ed Stevens tripled to score Galan and Furillo singled to score Stevens, after a wild pitch and a walk, Brecheen took over pitching duties for Dickson with St. Louis leading 8–3. Edwards singled off Brecheen and allowed Furillo to score, and after Cookie Lavagetto walked, the score was 8–4 with the bases loaded. The Cardinals kept the score from getting any closer, as Brecheen struck out the final two batters to end the game.

== Aftermath ==
The Cardinals advanced to the World Series against the Boston Red Sox, whom they defeated four games to three. While the Cardinals were facing the Dodgers, the Red Sox faced a team of American League All-Stars in an exhibition match. During the game, Ted Williams injured his elbow. He recovered in time to play in the World Series, but manager Joe Cronin blamed the injury on having to wait for the three-game series to finish, and pushed for future tie-breakers to be a single game. Cronin got his wish in the American League, as the 1948 American League tie-breaker was only a one-game matchup. However, the National League hosted three more series-style tie-breakers in later seasons before converting to a single-game format.

After Brooklyn lost the series, rumors of Durocher leaving to manage the New York Yankees, which had started in the final days of the regular season, resurfaced. Durocher responded by saying that he would remain the manager of the Dodgers "until I die", quelling any speculation.

The two games counted statistically as regular season games. As a result, Musial and Slaughter led the league with 156 games played, which could not have been equaled by anyone but a Brooklyn or St. Louis player. Musial's two hits in the series gave him a league-leading 228 for the season. Pollet's nine inning, two earned runs performance lowered his earned run average (ERA) to 2.10, and increased his win total to 21, both of which led the National League, narrowly edging out Johnny Sain's 20 wins and 2.21 ERA. Murry Dickson's victory in the second game gave him 15 wins and six losses on the season; this brought his win–loss percentage to .714, which led the National League. Musial finished the season with a .365 batting average, 124 runs, 50 doubles, 20 triples, 16 home runs, and 103 runs batted in, and won the Major League Baseball Most Valuable Player Award at the end of the season.
