= Wayne Terwilliger =

American baseball player (1925–2021)

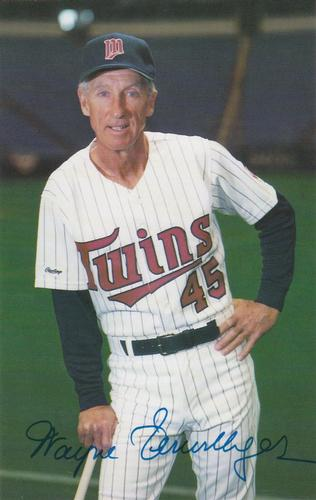
- Terwilliger in 1987 as a coach for the Minnesota Twins
- Second baseman
- Born: June 27, 1925; Clare, Michigan, U.S.
- Died: February 3, 2021 (aged 95); Weatherford, Texas, U.S.
- Batted: Right Threw: Right

MLB debut
- August 6, 1949, for the Chicago Cubs

Last MLB appearance
- May 16, 1960, for the Kansas City Athletics

MLB statistics
- Batting average: .240
- Home runs: 22
- Runs batted in: 162
- Stats at Baseball Reference

Teams
- Chicago Cubs (1949–1951); Brooklyn Dodgers (1951); Washington Senators (1953–1954); New York Giants (1955–1956); Kansas City Athletics (1959–1960)

Career highlights and awards
- 2× World Series Champion (1987, 1991)

Willard Wayne Terwilliger (June 27, 1925 – February 3, 2021), nicknamed "Twig", was an American professional baseball second baseman. He played nine seasons in Major League Baseball (MLB) between 1949 and 1960 for the Chicago Cubs, Brooklyn Dodgers, Washington Senators, New York Giants, and Kansas City Athletics.

== Early life ==
Terwilliger grew up in Michigan. He joined the Marines in 1943 following his 18th birthday and served as a radioman on an amphibious tank in the Pacific Theater of World War II.

While overseas, Terwilliger served in Tinian and Iwo Jima, and had his tank destroyed at Saipan. "We were hit and the tank bogged down," he told The Sporting News on April 26, 1950. "We had to abandon the tank. Everybody scattered into the nearest fox holes. But at just about that time a [Japanese] tank rolled up and began blasting away. I knew I had to get out of there, so I ran for the beach, zigzagging in and out with the tank chasing me. I'm sure I'd be lying out there somewhere now if it hadn't been for one of our own tanks, which luckily showed up while I was doing all that broken field running."

Terwilliger was discharged in late 1945 and attended Western Michigan College, where he quickly became a star shortstop. As early as 1946, he was attracting attention from major league scouts, and St. Louis Browns' scout Jack Fournier was particularly keen to sign him.

== Playing career ==
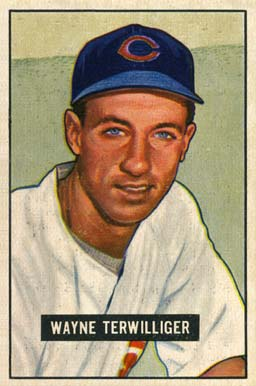
A 1951 Bowman Gum baseball card of Terwilliger

In 1948, after finishing college, Terwilliger was playing second base with the semi-pro Benton Harbor Buds when he was signed as a free agent in July by the Chicago Cubs. The Cubs assigned him to the Single-A Des Moines Bruins of the Western League, where he finished the season. In 1949, Terwilliger was promoted to the AAA Los Angeles Angels of the Pacific Coast League, where he batted .275 in 115 games, before being called up to the Cubs in August and playing in 36 games. Terwilliger spent the 1950 season as the Cubs' starting second baseman, hitting .242 with 10 home runs, 32 RBI, and 13 stolen bases. However, after getting off to a poor start to the 1951 season, Terwilliger was included in a trade that sent outfielder Andy Pafko, pitcher Johnny Schmitz, and catcher Rube Walker to the Brooklyn Dodgers for catcher Bruce Edwards, pitcher Joe Hatten, outfielder Gene Hermanski and infielder Eddie Miksis.

After spending the 1952 season with the AAA St. Paul Saints, Terwilliger was claimed off waivers by the Washington Senators following the 1952 season and spent the next two seasons as the Senators' second baseman. Prior to the start of the 1955 season, Terwilliger switched teams again after the New York Giants purchased him from the Senators. He spent the 1955 and '56 seasons shuttling between New York and AAA Minneapolis and the entire 1957 season at AAA. Following the 1957 season, he was traded to the Detroit Tigers in a swap for fellow journeymen infielder Jack Dittmer.

After spending 1958 with the Tigers' AAA Charleston Senators, he was acquired by the Kansas City A's from the Detroit Tigers in the December 1958 Rule 5 draft. In 1959, Terwilliger saw his last large stretch of time in the majors, playing 74 games at second and shortstop for the A's. After starting the 1960 season with the A's, Terwilliger was unofficially traded to the New York Yankees, a transaction that was common at the time between the two teams when the Yankees were accused of using the A's as a major league farm club and the two teams often seemed to have mutual rights to each other's players, and played the rest of the season at AAA Richmond Virginians before retiring as a full-time player.

In 666 games over nine seasons, Terwilliger posted a .240 batting average (501-for-2091) with 271 runs, 22 home runs, 162 RBI and 247 bases on balls. Defensively, he recorded a .974 fielding percentage playing primarily at second base.

== Coaching career ==
After his playing days were over, Terwilliger started a successful career as coach and minor-league manager in the Yankees' organization with the Greensboro Yankees of the B-level Carolina League. After taking the 1962 season off, Terwilliger was hired by the Washington Senators to manage their single-A team, the Wisconsin Rapids Senators in the Midwest League. He spent the following six seasons managing in the Senators organization, the last two at AAA.

Under manager Ted Williams, Terwilliger was the third base coach of the Senators from 1969 to 1971 and of the Texas Rangers in their first season, 1972. Following the season, Terwilliger was let go by the Rangers, following Williams' retirement, and managed the Houston Astros' AA Columbus Astros in 1973 and Texas' single-A Lynchburg Rangers in 1975 before spending the next four seasons managing the single-A Asheville Tourists. In 1980, he was hired as the manager of Texas' AA Tulsa Drillers.

Terwilliger returned as a major league coach after being hired to Don Zimmer's 1981 Rangers staff and stayed with the team for four years. He coached first for Zimmer, and then Darrell Johnson, Doug Rader, and Bobby Valentine. In 1986, he was hired as first base coach on Ray Miller's Minnesota Twins staff. He stayed on with rookie manager Tom Kelly, handling the job when the team won the World Series in 1987 and 1991 before leaving following the 1994 season.

Staying in Minnesota, Terwilliger returned to the St. Paul Saints in 1995, this time as the first base coach of the team in the independent Northern League. He remained with the team until 2002.

In 2003, Terwilliger was named manager of the Fort Worth Cats in the independent Central Baseball League, and won the 2005 Central League championship. After retiring from managing following the end of the 2005 season, Terwilliger accepted the position as first base coach for the Cats, at the age of 81, and remained with the team in the new American Association through the 2010 season.

Throughout his career, Terwilliger managed 12 minor-league teams and compiled a record of 1,224 wins and 1,089 losses. In 2006, Terwilliger's autobiography, Terwilliger Bunts One, which drew its title from Annie Dillard's essay on how her mother turned that phrase into a mantra, was released.

== Personal life ==
Terwilliger married twice. He first married Mary Jane Locke with whom he had a son, Steve, and a daughter, Marcie. His second wife's name was Linda.

Terwilliger died in Weatherford, Texas, on February 3, 2021, at the age of 95. He was receiving treatment for bladder cancer, but the cause of death was not given.

Sporting positions
Preceded by Bobby Hofman	Washington Senators/Texas Rangers third base coach 1969–1972	Succeeded by Chuck Hiller
Preceded by Fred Koenig	Texas Rangers first base coach 1981–1985	Succeeded by Art Howe
Preceded by Tony Oliva	Minnesota Twins first base coach 1986–1994	Succeeded by Jerry White
