= Erv Palica =

American baseball player (1928-1982)

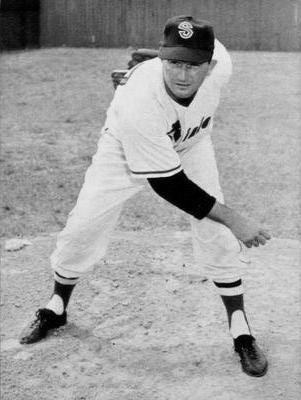
- Palica with the Seattle Indians in 1961
- Pitcher
- Born: February 9, 1928; Lomita, California, U.S.
- Died: May 29, 1982 (aged 54); Huntington Beach, California, U.S.
- Batted: Right Threw: Right

MLB debut
- April 21, 1945, for the Brooklyn Dodgers

Last MLB appearance
- September 24, 1956, for the Baltimore Orioles

MLB statistics
- Win–loss record: 41–55
- Earned run average: 4.22
- Strikeouts: 423
- Stats at Baseball Reference

Teams
- Brooklyn Dodgers (1945, 1947–1951, 1953–1954); Baltimore Orioles (1955–1956)

Ervin Martin Palica (born Pavliecevich; February 9, 1928 – May 29, 1982) was an American professional baseball player, a right-handed pitcher who appeared in 262 games played and 246 games pitched in Major League Baseball over ten seasons between 1945 and 1956 with the Brooklyn Dodgers and Baltimore Orioles. Born in Lomita, California, and of Yugoslav descent (described variously as Slovenian, Croatian and Serb–Montenegrin), he was listed as 6 feet 1 inch (1.85 m) tall and 180 pounds (82 kg). Three brothers (Alex, Ambrose "Bo" and Nick) played minor league baseball.

== Brooklyn Dodgers ==
At 17, Palica was the youngest player in the National League during 1945 at the time of his April debut with two pinch-running appearances for the Dodgers. (He did not score any runs in games played April 21 and 29, both against the rival New York Giants). He then began honing his skills as a pitcher in the minors, before returning to Brooklyn for three late-season mound appearances for the pennant-bound 1947 Dodgers. He spent the full seasons of 1948–51 with the Dodger varsity, getting into 152 games, most of them in relief. During his best season, 1950, he made 19 starts, won 13 of 21 decisions, and threw 10 complete games with two shutouts. He appeared in the 1949 World Series, throwing two shutout innings in relief against the New York Yankees in a losing cause during the Yanks' Game 5 clincher.

But 1951 was a terrible season on the field for Palica. On July 18, brought in to face the lowly Pittsburgh Pirates with the Dodgers behind 10–6 in the fifth inning, Palica held the fort, allowing one run over three innings while the Dodgers overcame the deficit and went ahead, 12–11, in their half of the sixth. But in the eighth frame, Palica could not hold the lead, allowing a solo home run to slugger Ralph Kiner and an RBI single to former Dodger star Pete Reiser. Pittsburgh went on to a 13–12 triumph, and, after the game—which had featured angry battles between the Dodgers and the umpiring crew—Brooklyn manager Chuck Dressen lost his temper and witheringly questioned Palica's courage in "on the record" remarks to the assembled media. Having lost confidence in Palica, Dressen used him in only four more games and 4 1/3 innings pitched in August 1951. Palica did not pitch after August 27, as the archrival Giants roared back from a 13 1/2-game mid-August deficit to tie the Dodgers and force a playoff, which they won on Bobby Thomson's famous walk-off homer.

== Korean War and Baltimore Orioles ==
By that point, Palica was in the United States Army performing military service during the Korean War. He missed the 1952–53 seasons completely, and returned in 1954 to appear in 25 games for new Dodger manager Walter Alston, most of them as a reliever. During the offseason of 1954–55, he was traded to the Orioles, a second-division American League team that gave Palica a chance to reclaim a starting pitcher role. He got into 62 games over two seasons with Baltimore, 39 as a starter, but posted only a 9–22 record. During his big-league career, Palica allowed 806 hits and 399 bases on balls in 839 1/3 innings pitched. He struck out 423, threw 20 complete games and three shutouts, and was credited with a dozen saves.

== After major league career ==
Palica spent the final seven seasons of his pro career (1957–63) back in the minors, winning 15 games three different times in the top-level Pacific Coast League.

In retirement, Palica worked as a longshoreman in Southern California, and died from a heart attack at age 54 in Huntington Beach.
