= Billy Cox (baseball) =

American baseball player (1919–1978)

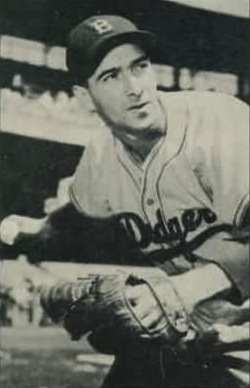
- Cox in 1953
- Third baseman / Shortstop
- Born: August 29, 1919; Newport, Pennsylvania, U.S.
- Died: March 30, 1978 (aged 58); Harrisburg, Pennsylvania, U.S.
- Batted: Right Threw: Right

MLB debut
- September 20, 1941, for the Pittsburgh Pirates

Last MLB appearance
- June 11, 1955, for the Baltimore Orioles

MLB statistics
- Batting average: .262
- Home runs: 66
- Runs batted in: 351
- Stats at Baseball Reference

Teams
- Pittsburgh Pirates (1941, 1946–1947); Brooklyn Dodgers (1948–1954); Baltimore Orioles (1955)

William Richard Cox (August 29, 1919 – March 30, 1978) was an American professional baseball third baseman and shortstop. He played in Major League Baseball (MLB) for the Pittsburgh Pirates, Brooklyn Dodgers, and Baltimore Orioles. He was one of the top fielding third basemen of his time, and played in three World Series for the Brooklyn Dodgers. Hall of fame third baseman George Kell once said, "'I never dreamed third base could be played with such artistry until I saw Cox in [the 1952 World] Series.'"

== Early life ==
Cox was Born on August 29, 1919, in Newport, Pennsylvania. He attended Newport High School, where he was an exceptional baseball player for the Newport Buffaloes, graduating in 1939. Like his father Frederick Cox, he also played semi-pro baseball.

== Professional baseball and military service ==
=== Pre-war (1940-41) ===
In 1940, Cox signed to play for the independent Class-B Harrisburg Senators of the Interstate League. Playing shortstop for the 1940 Senators, he had a .288 batting average, with eight home runs, five triples and twenty-four doubles in 120 games; and was named an all-star. In 1941 for the Senators, he hit .363, with six home runs, 15 triples and 42 doubles, leading the league in batting average, hits, doubles and total bases. Defensively, he set a league record for most assists by a shortstop.

Cox came to the attention of Pittsburgh Pirate scout Pie Traynor, who had been a Hall of Fame third baseman for the Pirates. Cox was signed by the Pittsburgh Pirates in 1941, after the Pirates paid the Senators $20,000. (It has also been stated the Pirates signed Cox as an amateur free agent in 1940.) Cox made his MLB debut with the Pirates on September 20, 1941, playing in ten games at shortstop that season. These would be his last games with the Pirates until 1946.

=== World War II service ===
Cox entered military service on February 9, 1942. He did have the opportunity to play organized baseball at times in the military, and he was once allowed to play for the Pirates in an exhibition game against the Harrisburg Senators in 1942. Soon after, he was sent overseas as part of the 814th Signal Corps, the role of which was to follow front line troops and lay wire to set up communication centers. He served in North Africa, Sicily, Italy, France and Germany. He also served 18 months on Guadalcanal. He was discharged from the service in November 1945.

=== Return to the Pirates ===
He signed a new contract with the Pirates in early 1946, and returned to play in the 1946 season, again at shortstop. Among those teaching him how to better play the position were Hall of Famers Honus Wagner and Pirate manager Frankie Frisch. Although he had missed four years of major league baseball, he hit .290, and was 27th in Most Valuable Player (MVP) voting. In 1947, he hit .274, with career highs in home runs (15), triples (7), doubles (30), hits (145), runs batted in (RBI) (54), and runs scored (75). His fielding percentage at shortstop went from .935 in 1946 to .968 in 1947.

=== Brooklyn Dodgers ===
Cox was traded to the Brooklyn Dodgers on December 8, 1947, along with Preacher Roe (Cox's friend and roommate) and Gene Mauch, for Dixie Walker, Hal Gregg and Vic Lombardi. Walker was a lifetime .300 hitter, but was nearing the end of his career; but more significantly, he had strongly opposed Jackie Robinson's joining the Dodgers in 1947 and breaking MLB's color barrier. Gregg's usage declined in the ensuing few years before his retirement, and Lombardi finished his major league career by 1950.

Roe would go on to have a 93–37 won–loss record for the Dodgers over seven years, including 15, 19, and 22 win seasons as a starting pitcher; and Cox became an important player for the Dodgers at third base, also playing seven years in Brooklyn. He developed a reputation as one of baseball's best fielding third basemen, and possibly the best at this time. He was also known for his timely hitting. After seeing Cox field in the 1952 World Series, Hall of Fame third baseman George Kell said, "'I never dreamed third base could be played with such artistry until I saw Cox in that Series.'"

From 1949-53, Cox was the principal third baseman of a Dodgers infield that included Gil Hodges (first base), Jackie Robinson (second base) and Pee Wee Reese (shortstop); though Robinson played significant numbers of games at third base and the outfield in 1953, and little at second base (where Jim Gilliam had taken over the position). In 1950, he led National League third baseman with a .957 fielding percentage, and was second in 1951 (.967). His fielding percentages at third base were similar in his other Dodger years (1948/.958, 1949/.964, 1952/.970, 1953/.974, and 1954/.961).

In 1952, he was 23rd in MVP voting. From 1949-53, seasons in which he had at least 371 plate appearances, Cox hit between .233 and .291. His best Dodgers hitting year came in 1953, in only 327 at bats. Cox hit .291, with 10 home runs, 18 doubles, 44 RBIs, 44 runs scored and an .806 OPS (on-base plus slugging). This was also his best fielding year (.974 fielding percentage).

The Dodgers won the National League Championship and went on to the World Series in 1949, 1952 and 1953. Cox played in all three World Series against the Yankees, all ending in defeat for the Dodgers. In the 1953 World Series, Cox had a two-run double in Game 2 and a three-run home run in Game 5 against the New York Yankees. He batted .304 for the Series and led Brooklyn in runs batted in with six, with an .899 OPS. In 15 World Series games, he had a career post-season average of .302 with an .806 OPS, five doubles and one home run, six RBI and seven runs scored.

=== Baltimore Orioles ===
In 1955, Cox and Roe were traded together for a second time. Cox was acquired along with Preacher Roe by the Baltimore Orioles from the Dodgers on December 14, 1954 for a pair of minor-leaguers, infielder Harry Schwegman and right-handed pitcher John Jancse, and $60,000. The trade also gave the Dodgers financial space to sign future Hall of Fame pitcher Sandy Koufax.

Cox was an infield starter (principally at third base) and leadoff hitter with the Orioles during the first half of 1955, starting at third base and hitting leadoff in the Orioles opening game that year. He started 34 games at third base, and twelve more between shortstop and second base. A number of other Orioles played third base that year, including future Hall of Fame third baseman Brooks Robinson who was in his first year as an Oriole.

Two months into the 1955 season, on June 15, he was traded along with Gene Woodling from the Orioles to the Cleveland Indians for Dave Pope, Wally Westlake and cash before the trade deadline on June 15, 1955. His former Pirate teammate Hank Greenberg was Cleveland's general manager who had traded for Cox. At the time, Cox had played in 53 games for the 19–39 Orioles, and was batting .211. He would not report to his new team. Even after a meeting with Indians' manager Al López, Cox resolved to retire and did so on June 17. Cox told López and Greenberg that he had a bad leg, and was suffering form an inguinal hernia, and did not believe he could go on playing.

=== Career ===
In 1058 games over 11 seasons, Cox posted a .262 batting average (974-for-3712) with 470 runs, 174 doubles, 32 triples, 66 home runs, 351 RBIs, 42 stolen bases, .318 on-base percentage and .380 slugging percentage. He finished his career with a .962 fielding percentage playing primarily at third base and also at shortstop and second base. In 15 World Series games, he batted .302 (16-for-53) with 7 runs, 5 doubles, 1 home run, 6 RBIs and 4 walks. As of 2025, he ranks 40th all-time in fielding percentage by a third baseman.

== Legacy ==
There is a chapter on Cox in Roger Kahn's book “The Boys of Summer,” about the 1952-53 Dodgers; considered one of the greatest books about baseball ever written.

In 1971, Cox was inducted into the Capital Area [Harrisburg] Hall of Fame.

== Death ==
Cox died of esophageal cancer in 1978, in Harrisburg, Pennsylvania, at age 58.
