= Ken Trinkle =

American baseball player (1919–1976)

- Pitcher
- Born: December 15, 1919; Paoli, Indiana, U.S.
- Died: May 10, 1976 (aged 56); Paoli, Indiana, U.S.
- Batted: Right Threw: Right

MLB debut
- April 25, 1943, for the New York Giants

Last MLB appearance
- October 2, 1949, for the Philadelphia Phillies

MLB statistics
- Win–loss record: 21–29
- Earned run average: 3.74
- Strikeouts: 130
- Stats at Baseball Reference

Teams
- New York Giants (1943, 1946–1948); Philadelphia Phillies (1949)

Kenneth Wayne Trinkle (December 15, 1919 – May 10, 1976) was an American professional baseball player and right-handed pitcher who appeared in 216 games in Major League Baseball with the New York Giants (1943 and 1946–1948) and Philadelphia Phillies (1949). A relief specialist, he led the National League in appearances in 1946 and 1947. The native of Paoli, Indiana, stood 6 feet 1 inch (1.85 m) tall and weighed 175 pounds (79 kg).

== Biography ==
=== Early baseball career ===
Ken Trinkle signed his first professional contract with the Class D Thomasville Orioles in 1939 after high school. Trinkle hurled for the minor-league Baltimore Orioles of the International League from 1940 to 1942, and was 15–11 during his last year with the Orioles before being purchased by the New York Giants.

Trinkle made his major league debut with the Giants on April 25, 1943, at age 23. He made 11 appearances with the Giants. Despite a respectable 3.74 earned run average (ERA), he went 1–5 and was farmed out to the Jersey City Giants of the International League.

=== Military service ===
On September 18, 1943, Trinkle entered military service with the United States Army during World War II. In 1944, he was stationed at Fort Riley, Kansas, where he played with the Fort Riley baseball team. He played alongside Pete Reiser, Harry Walker, Joe Gantenbein, Al Brazle, Murry Dickson and Joe Garagiola.

Trinkle, Dickson and Gantenbein were later shipped to France. They eventually had been separated upon arrival. Trinkle went to the replacement center and served for the 9th Armored Division military unit. He fought during the Battle of the Bulge and was awarded a Bronze Star for his service. "I was a scout in a reconnaissance outfit", he told The Sporting News on June 4, 1947. "We would go out in front of the infantry to report if anything was there. If you didn’t come back, they knew there was something out there."

After the German surrender in May 1945, Trinkle teamed up with Ralph Houk for the 9th Armored Division baseball team. They made it to the play-offs of the 1945 ETO World Series. Another teammate was a Minor League Baseball player, Ed Musial, who was Stan's younger brother. After the cease of hostilities in Europe, Trinkle played for the 71st Infantry Division Red Circlers baseball team. The team featured players such as Ewell Blackwell, Ancil Moore, Johnny Wyrostek, Garland Lawing, Russ Kern, Milt Ticco, Herb Bremer and Bill Ayers. The team eventually lost the World Series.

=== Postwar baseball career ===
By November 1945, Trinkle was back playing with the New York Giants. He made a league-leading 48 appearances for the Giants in 1946, and in 1947, he again led the National League in appearances with 62, finishing 38 of those games. On June 11, 1947, future Baseball Hall of Famer Mel Ott made his last appearance as a player when he pinch hit for Trinkle in the New York Giants' 8–7 loss to the Pittsburgh Pirates when he popped the ball to shortstop. He made a further 53 appearances in 1948, but Trinkle was purchased by the Philadelphia Phillies on December 14.

In 1949, his only season with Philadelphia and his last in MLB, Trinkle pitched in 42 games and recorded his highest major league earned run average (ERA) at 4.00. Trinkle returned to the International League in 1950, pitching for the Toronto Maple Leafs that season, then returning to Baltimore for the 1951 and 1952 campaigns.

Trinkle died on May 10, 1976, in hometown of Paoli at age 56.
