= Mike Schultz =

Mike Schultz may refer to:

- Mike Schultz (2000s pitcher) (born 1979), baseball player
- Mike Schultz (1940s pitcher) (1920–2004), baseball player
- Mike Schultz (American football) (born 1958), American football coach
- Mike Schultz (politician) (born 1950), American politician from Utah
- Mike Schultz (snowboarder) (born 1981), Paralympic snowboarder

== See also ==
- Mike Schulz (born 1964), American politician
