= Harry Taylor (1946–1952 pitcher) =

American baseball player (1919–2000)

- Pitcher
- Born: May 20, 1919; East Glenn, Indiana, U.S.
- Died: November 5, 2000 (aged 81); Terre Haute, Indiana, U.S.
- Batted: Right Threw: Right

MLB debut
- September 22, 1946, for the Brooklyn Dodgers

Last MLB appearance
- May 4, 1952, for the Boston Red Sox

MLB statistics
- Win–loss record: 19–21
- Earned run average: 4.10
- Strikeouts: 127
- Stats at Baseball Reference

Teams
- Brooklyn Dodgers (1946–1948); Boston Red Sox (1950–1952)

James Harry Taylor (May 20, 1919 – November 5, 2000) was an American professional baseball player. He was a right-handed pitcher who appeared in 90 games, 44 as a starter, in Major League Baseball for the Brooklyn Dodgers (1946–48) and Boston Red Sox (1950–52). The native of East Glenn, Indiana, stood 6 feet 1 inch (1.85 m) tall and weighed 175 pounds (79 kg).

Taylor's professional career lasted from 1938 through 1955, with five seasons (1941–45) missed due to United States Army service in World War II and another two (1953–54) out of organized baseball in the semipro ranks. He spent the entire 1947 campaign on the Dodgers' big-league roster, winning ten of 15 decisions with 20 starting assignments and two shutouts. It was an eventful season for Brooklyn that saw Jackie Robinson break the baseball color line in the Major Leagues, manager Leo Durocher's season-long suspension for "conduct detrimental to baseball", and the Dodgers win their seventh overall National League pennant.

Taylor was the Dodgers' starting pitcher in Game 4 of the 1947 World Series on October 3 at Ebbets Field. Matched against the New York Yankees' Bill Bevens, Taylor failed to record an out, facing four batters in the first inning and allowing two singles, a base on balls, a fielder's choice (the batter reaching on an error) and an unearned run before being relieved by Hal Gregg, who got out of the inning without further scoring. Bevens, meanwhile, threw 8 2/3 innings of no-hit baseball. But the Yankee hurler allowed ten bases on balls, and his no-hitter and game were ruined by pinch hitter Cookie Lavagetto's ninth-inning double, scoring the decisive two runs and enabling the Dodgers to win, 3–2.

Taylor returned to the minor leagues during the 1948 season, and spent almost all of the following two years at Triple-A. But in September 1950, his contract was purchased by the Red Sox, who were chasing the Yankees and Detroit Tigers in the American League pennant race. After one game in relief, he threw two complete game victories, September 25 against the Philadelphia Athletics (a two-hit shutout) and October 1 against the Yankees. But Boston fell short in the standings, finishing in third place, four games behind the Yankees.

In his 90 MLB games, Taylor worked 357 2/3 innings pitched, and allowed 344 hits and 201 bases on balls. He recorded 127 strikeouts, 16 complete games and four saves.

He posted a .161 batting average (20-for-124) in his career. He fielded his position well, recording a .990 fielding percentage with only one error in 105 total chances.
