= 1951 Major League Baseball All-Star Game =

1951 American baseball competition

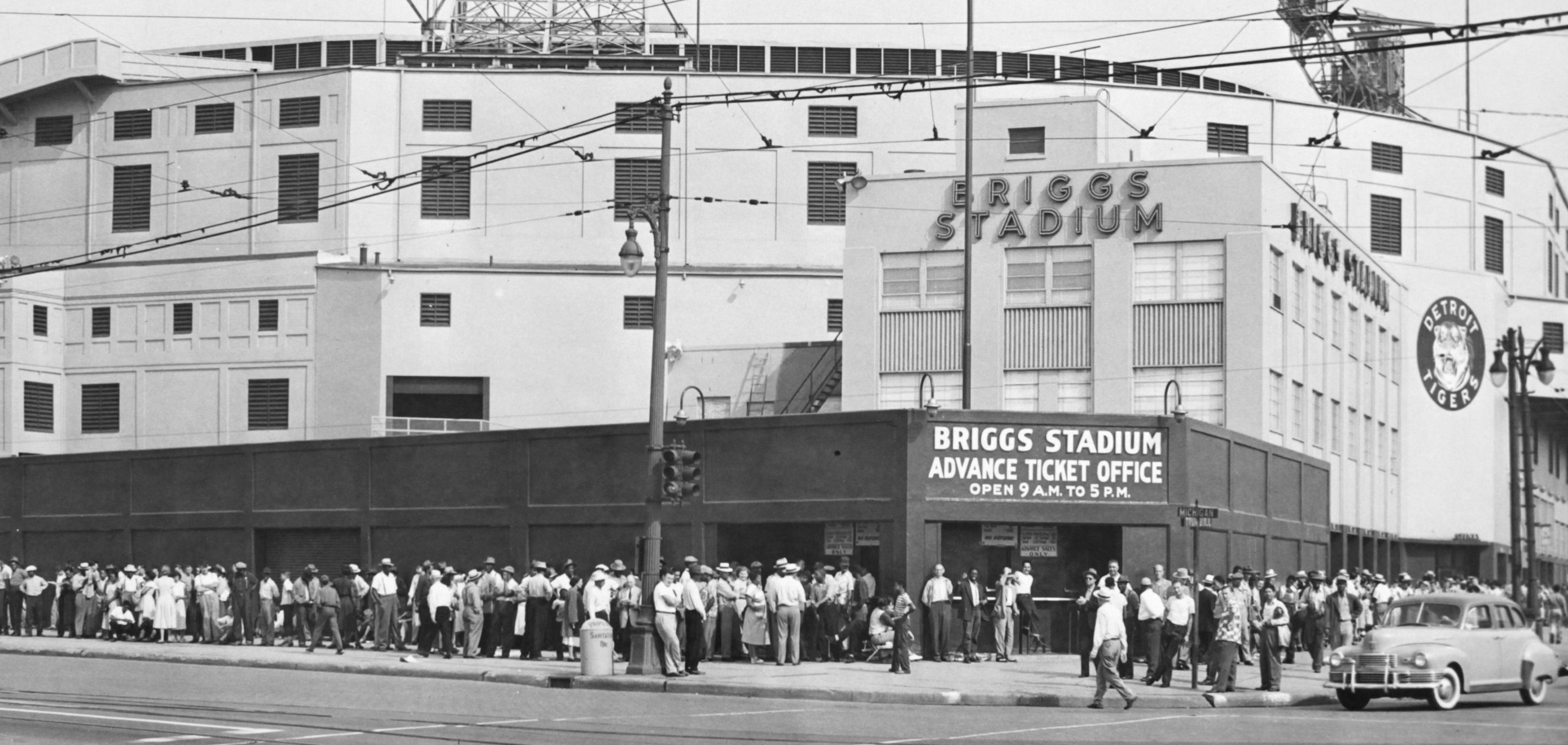
	1	2	3	4	5	6	7	8	9	R	H	E
National League	1	0	0	3	0	2	1	1	0	8	12	1
American League	0	1	0	1	1	0	0	0	0	3	10	2
- Date: July 10, 1951
- Venue: Briggs Stadium
- City: Detroit, Michigan
- Managers: Eddie Sawyer (Philadelphia Phillies); Casey Stengel (New York Yankees)
- Attendance: 52,075
- Ceremonial first pitch: Ty Cobb
- Television: NBC
- TV announcers: Jack Brickhouse and Jim Britt
- Radio: Mutual
- Radio announcers: Al Helfer and Mel Allen

The 1951 Major League Baseball All-Star Game was the 18th playing of the midsummer classic between the all-stars of the American League (AL) and National League (NL), the two leagues comprising Major League Baseball. The game was held on July 10, 1951, at Briggs Stadium in Detroit, Michigan the home of the Detroit Tigers of the American League. The game resulted in the National League defeating the American League 8–3.

== Summary ==
The 1951 game was originally awarded to the Philadelphia Phillies. The City of Detroit was celebrating the 250th anniversary of its founding in 1701 and requested to host the year's All-Star Game. Although the National League was scheduled to host the game in '51, the game was moved to Detroit. The Phillies hosted the 1952 Game.

Long-time Tigers player and broadcaster Harry Heilmann died at age 56 in Detroit the day prior to the game. A moment of silence was observed in Heilmann's memory prior to the game's start.

The American League was 7–5 favorites to win the game. The ceremonial first pitch was delivered by Ty Cobb. Chico Carrasquel became the first Latin American player in Major League history to start in an All-Star game.

== Opening lineups ==
National League			American League
Player	Team	Pos	Player	Team	Pos
Richie Ashburn	Philadelphia Phillies	CF	Dom DiMaggio	Boston Red Sox	CF
Alvin Dark	New York Giants	SS	Nellie Fox	Chicago White Sox	2B
Stan Musial	St. Louis Cardinals	LF	George Kell	Detroit Tigers	3B
Jackie Robinson	Brooklyn Dodgers	2B	Ted Williams	Boston Red Sox	LF
Gil Hodges	Brooklyn Dodgers	1B	Yogi Berra	New York Yankees	C
Bob Elliott	Boston Braves	3B	Vic Wertz	Detroit Tigers	RF
Del Ennis	Philadelphia Phillies	RF	Ferris Fain	Philadelphia Athletics	1B
Roy Campanella	Brooklyn Dodgers	C	Chico Carrasquel	Chicago White Sox	SS
Robin Roberts	Philadelphia Phillies	P	Ned Garver	St. Louis Browns	P

== Rosters ==
Players in italics have since been inducted into the National Baseball Hall of Fame.

1951 National League All-Star Game roster
Pitchers: 47 (United States) Ewell Blackwell; 46 (United States) Larry Jansen *; 20 (United States) Dutch Leonard *; 35 (United States) Sal Maglie; 36 (United States) Don Newcombe; 36 (United States) Robin Roberts; 28 (United States) Preacher Roe *; 21 (United States) Warren Spahn *; Catchers: 39 (United States) Roy Campanella; 8 (United States) Bruce Edwards *	Infielders: 19 (United States) Alvin Dark; 3 (United States) Bob Elliott; 14 (United States) Gil Hodges; 6 (United States) Willie Jones; 1 (United States) Pee Wee Reese; 42 (United States) Jackie Robinson; 2 (United States) Red Schoendienst; Outfielders: 1 (United States) Richie Ashburn; 14 (United States) Del Ennis; 4 (United States) Ralph Kiner; 6 (United States) Stan Musial; 9 (United States) Enos Slaughter; 4 (United States) Duke Snider; 17 (United States) Wally Westlake; 22 (United States) Johnny Wyrostek	Manager: 24 (United States) Eddie Sawyer; Coaches: 11 (United States) Benny Bengough; 32 (United States) Dusty Cooke; (United States) Cy Perkins; * = Did not play

1951 American League All-Star Game roster
Pitchers: 31 (United States) Ned Garver; 18 (United States) Randy Gumpert *; 29 (United States) Fred Hutchinson; 21 (United States) Bob Lemon; 30 (United States) Eddie Lopat; 22 (Cuba) Connie Marrero *; 17 (United States) Mel Parnell; 30 (United States) Bobby Shantz *; Catchers: 8 (United States) Yogi Berra; 4 (United States) Jim Hegan	Infielders: 17 (Venezuela) Chico Carrasquel; 1 (United States) Bobby Doerr; 8 (United States) Ferris Fain; 26 (United States) Nellie Fox; 7 (United States) George Kell; 10 (United States) Phil Rizzuto; 46 (United States) Eddie Robinson; 5 (United States) Vern Stephens; Outfielders: 3 (United States) Jim Busby; 7 (United States) Dom DiMaggio; 5 (United States) Joe DiMaggio *; 14 (United States) Larry Doby; 9 (Cuba) Minnie Miñoso; 5 (United States) Vic Wertz; 9 (United States) Ted Williams	Manager: 37 (United States) Casey Stengel; Coaches: 33 (United States) Bill Dickey; 15 (United States) Tommy Henrich; * = Did not play

== Line score ==
Tuesday, July 10, 1951 1:30 pm (ET) at Briggs Stadium in Detroit, Michigan
Team	1	2	3	4	5	6	7	8	9	R	H	E
National League	1	0	0	3	0	2	1	1	0	8	12	1
American League	0	1	0	1	1	0	0	0	0	3	10	2
WP: Sal Maglie (1–0) LP: Eddie Lopat (0–1) Sv: Ewell Blackwell (1); Home runs: NL: Stan Musial (1), Bob Elliott (1), Gil Hodges (1), Ralph Kiner (1); AL: Vic Wertz (1), George Kell (1)

How the runs scored
Team	Inning	Play	NL	AL
NL	1st	Ashburn scored on E4	1	0
AL	2nd	Fain tripled, Berra scored	1	1
NL	4th	Musial homered; Elliott homered, Hodges scored	4	1
AL	4th	Wertz homered	4	2
AL	5th	Kell homered	4	3
NL	6th	Hodges homered, Robinson scored	6	3
NL	7th	Robinson singled, Ashburn scored	7	3
NL	8th	Kiner homered	8	3

Play-by-play at Retrosheet
