= Bruce Edwards (baseball) =

American baseball player (1923–1975)

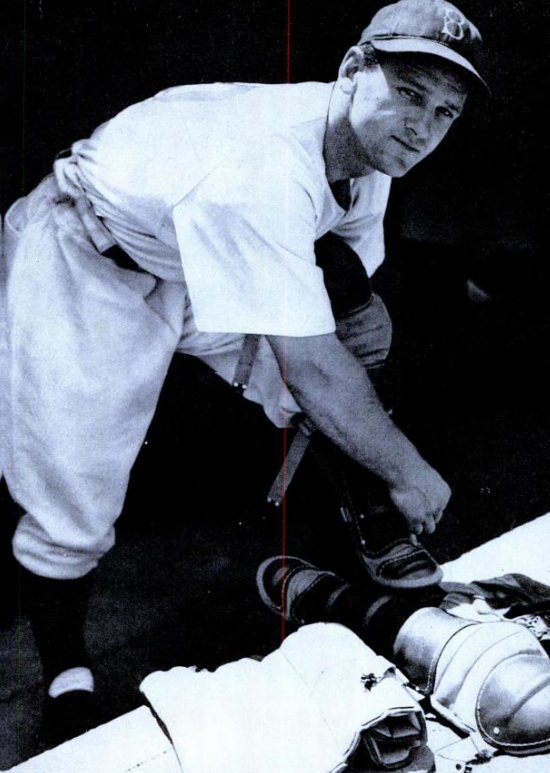
- Bruce Edwards in 1946
- Catcher
- Born: July 15, 1923; Quincy, Illinois, U.S.
- Died: April 25, 1975 (aged 51); Sacramento, California, U.S.
- Batted: Right Threw: Right

MLB debut
- June 23, 1946, for the Brooklyn Dodgers

Last MLB appearance
- September 13, 1956, for the Cincinnati Reds

MLB statistics
- Batting average: .256
- Home runs: 39
- Runs batted in: 241
- Stats at Baseball Reference

Teams
- Brooklyn Dodgers (1946–1951); Chicago Cubs (1951–1952, 1954); Washington Senators (1955); Cincinnati Reds (1956)

Career highlights and awards
- 2× All-Star (1947, 1951)

Charles Bruce Edwards (July 15, 1923 – April 25, 1975) was an American professional baseball player. He played for ten seasons as a catcher in Major League Baseball from 1946 to 1952 and from 1954 to 1956, most notably for the Brooklyn Dodgers.

== Baseball career ==
Edwards began his professional baseball career in 1941 at the age of 17 with the Santa Barbara Saints of the California League. After serving in the United States Army during the Second World War, he returned to baseball in 1946 with the Mobile Bears of the Southern Association, where he posted a .332 batting average. In June 1946, Edwards' contract was purchased from Mobile by the Brooklyn Dodgers.

Edwards made his major league debut with the Dodgers on June 23, 1946 at the age of 22 and was installed as the Dodgers' starting catcher by manager Leo Durocher, after Mickey Owen had fled the team to join the Mexican League. He hit for a .246 batting average as the Dodgers battled the St. Louis Cardinals in a tight pennant race. The two teams ended the season tied for first place and met in the 1946 National League tie-breaker series. It was the first playoff tiebreaker in Major League Baseball history. The Cardinals won the first two games of the best-of-three game series to capture the National League pennant. Edwards finished in fourteenth place in balloting for the 1946 National League Most Valuable Player Award.

By the beginning of the 1947 season, Edwards was considered one of the top catchers in the league. He had the best season of his career, hitting for a .295 batting average along with 9 home runs and 80 runs batted in, as the Dodgers won the National League pennant by five games over the Cardinals. Edwards started every game of the 1947 World Series as the Dodgers were defeated in seven games by the New York Yankees. He hit into a Series-ending double play in the ninth inning of Game 7. Edwards finished fourth in balloting for 1947 National League Most Valuable Player Award, and was named to the National League team as a reserve in the 1947 All-Star Game.

In 1948, infield troubles forced the Dodgers to move Edwards to third base for half of the season while rookie Roy Campanella was brought up from the minor leagues to play as catcher. His batting average dropped to .276 with 8 home runs and 56 runs batted in, as the Dodgers fell to third place in the National League. An arm injury incurred during spring training in 1948 as well as the blossoming of Campanella as a hitter eventually relegated Edwards to second-string status, although he was still considered among the best catchers in the National League.

On June 15, 1951, Edwards was traded by the Brooklyn Dodgers to the Chicago Cubs as part of an eight-player trade. In July, he earned his second All-Star berth when he was named as a reserve in the 1951 All-Star Game. Edwards appeared in only 50 games in 1952, mostly as a pinch hitter.

In 1953, he was sent down to the minor leagues where he played for the Springfield Cubs before becoming the player-manager for the Cubs' minor league affiliate, the Des Moines Bruins of the Western League. Edwards played as a third baseman and hit .321 while he managed Des Moines to a fourth-place finish, winning the Western League play off championship. He performed so well that the Cubs announced in October that he would return to the major leagues as a third baseman. However, after appearing in only four games with the Cubs in April 1954, he returned to the minor leagues where he played for the Los Angeles Angels of the Pacific Coast League, posting a .298 batting average in 106 games.

In December 1954, he returned to the major leagues again when his contract was purchased from the Angels by the Washington Senators. After only one season with the Senators, Edwards was released during spring training in 1956. He signed by the Cincinnati Reds as a free agent in July 1956 and played in his final major league game on September 13, 1956. Edwards returned to the minor leagues to play two seasons with the Visalia Redlegs before ending his playing career in 1958 at the age of 34.

== Career statistics ==
In a ten-year major league career, Edwards played in 591 games, accumulating 429 hits in 1,675 at bats for a .256 career batting average along with 39 home runs, 241 runs batted in and an on-base percentage of .335. He ended his career with a .982 fielding percentage. A two-time All-Star, Edwards led National League catchers once in putouts and once in baserunners caught stealing. Edwards was the Dodgers' catcher on September 9, 1948, when pitcher Rex Barney threw a no-hitter against the New York Giants.

Edwards died of a heart attack in his home in Sacramento, California, on April 25, 1975, at the age of 51.
