= Phil Haugstad =

American baseball player (1924–1998)

- Pitcher
- Born: February 23, 1924; Black River Falls, Wisconsin, U.S.
- Died: October 21, 1998 (aged 74); Black River Falls, Wisconsin, U.S.
- Batted: Right Threw: Right

MLB debut
- September 1, 1947, for the Brooklyn Dodgers

Last MLB appearance
- July 1, 1952, for the Cincinnati Reds

MLB statistics
- Win–loss record: 1–1
- Earned run average: 5.59
- Strikeouts: 28
- Stats at Baseball Reference

Teams
- Brooklyn Dodgers (1947–1948, 1951); Cincinnati Reds (1952)

Philip Donald Haugstad (February 23, 1924 – October 21, 1998) was an American pitcher in Major League Baseball.

He was born in Black River Falls, Wisconsin. Haugstad pitched from 1947 to 1952 with the Brooklyn Dodgers and Cincinnati Reds.
