= Tommy Tatum =

American baseball player (1919–1989)

- Center fielder
- Born: July 16, 1919; Decatur, Texas, U.S.
- Died: November 7, 1989 (aged 70); Oklahoma City, Oklahoma, U.S.
- Batted: Right Threw: Right

MLB debut
- August 1, 1941, for the Brooklyn Dodgers

Last MLB appearance
- September 24, 1947, for the Cincinnati Reds

MLB statistics
- Batting average: .258
- Home runs: 1
- Runs batted in: 17
- Stats at Baseball Reference

Teams
- Brooklyn Dodgers (1941, 1947); Cincinnati Reds (1947)

V T "Tommy" Tatum (July 16, 1919 – November 7, 1989) was an American center fielder in Major League Baseball who played with the Brooklyn Dodgers and Cincinnati Reds in 1941 and 1947. Born in Decatur, Texas, he served in the Army from 1942 to 1946 during World War II.

In 81 games over two major league seasons, Tatum posted a .258 batting average (50-for-194) with 20 runs, 1 home run and 17 RBIs.

He was the manager of the Oklahoma City Indians from 1951 to 1955 after his playing career ended. He died at age 70 in Oklahoma City, Oklahoma.
