= Vic Lombardi =

American baseball player (1922–1997)

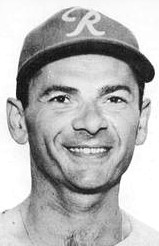
- Pitcher
- Born: September 20, 1922; Reedley, California, U.S.
- Died: December 3, 1997 (aged 75); Fresno, California, U.S.
- Batted: Left Threw: Left

MLB debut
- April 18, 1945, for the Brooklyn Dodgers

Last MLB appearance
- September 24, 1950, for the Pittsburgh Pirates

MLB statistics
- Win–loss record: 50–51
- Earned run average: 3.68
- Strikeouts: 340
- Stats at Baseball Reference

Teams
- Brooklyn Dodgers (1945–1947); Pittsburgh Pirates (1948–1950)

Victor Alvin Lombardi (September 20, 1922 – December 3, 1997) was an American pitcher in Major League Baseball. He pitched from 1945 to 1950 with the Brooklyn Dodgers and Pittsburgh Pirates. He was the starting pitcher in two games of the 1947 World Series for the Dodgers. On December 8, 1947, Lombardi was traded, along with Hal Gregg and Dixie Walker, to Pittsburgh for Gene Mauch, Billy Cox and Preacher Roe.

In 1978 Lombardi was inducted into the Fresno Athletic Hall of Fame.

Lombardi died in December 1997 at the age of 75 from complications related to heart surgery.
