= Walt Lanfranconi =

American baseball player (1916–1986)

- Pitcher
- Born: November 9, 1916; Barre, Vermont, U.S.
- Died: August 17, 1986 (aged 69); Barre, Vermont, U.S.
- Batted: Right Threw: Right

MLB debut
- September 12, 1941, for the Chicago Cubs

Last MLB appearance
- September 14, 1947, for the Boston Braves

MLB statistics
- Win–loss record: 4–5
- Earned run average: 2.96
- Strikeouts: 19
- Stats at Baseball Reference

Teams
- Chicago Cubs (1941); Boston Braves (1947)

Walter Oswald Lanfranconi (November 9, 1916 – August 17, 1986) was an American Major League Baseball pitcher. The 155 lb (70 kg) right-hander played for the Chicago Cubs (1941) and Boston Braves (1947). His career was unusual in that he went almost six years between major league appearances.

Lanfranconi made his major league debut in relief against the Philadelphia Phillies at Wrigley Field (September 12, 1941). Twelve days later he started and lost 2–0 to All-Star Bucky Walters and the Cincinnati Reds. Then, as a 30-year-old in 1947, he went 4–4 with one save as a starter and reliever for the Braves. In one of his best games, he defeated the Philadelphia Phillies 7–1 in the nightcap of a 4th of July double-header at Shibe Park with 28,580 fans in attendance.

Lanfranconi's career totals include a record of 4–5 in 38 games, 70 innings pitched, 19 strikeouts, and an ERA of 2.96.

Lanfranconi missed the 1943–45 baseball seasons due to military service with the US Army during World War II.

Lanfranconi died in his hometown of Barre, Vermont, at the age of 69. He was buried at Hope Cemetery in Barre.
