= Ed Stevens (baseball) =

American baseball player (1925–2012)

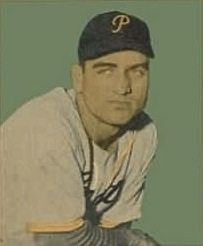
- Stevens' 1949 Bowman Gum baseball card
- First baseman
- Born: January 12, 1925; Galveston, Texas, U.S.
- Died: July 22, 2012 (aged 87); Houston, Texas, U.S.
- Batted: Left Threw: Left

MLB debut
- July 20, 1945, for the Brooklyn Dodgers

Last MLB appearance
- October 1, 1950, for the Pittsburgh Pirates

MLB statistics
- Batting average: .252
- Home runs: 28
- Runs batted in: 193
- Stats at Baseball Reference

Teams
- Brooklyn Dodgers (1945–1947); Pittsburgh Pirates (1948–1950)

Edward Lee "Big Ed" Stevens (January 12, 1925 – July 22, 2012) was a first baseman in Major League Baseball who played from 1945 through 1950 with the Brooklyn Dodgers and Pittsburgh Pirates. Listed at 6' 1", 190 lb., he batted and threw left-handed.

Born in Galveston, Texas, Stevens was originally signed as a 16-year-old by the Dodgers. He played minor league ball in parts of four seasons before joining the big team in 1945.

As a rookie, he shared duties at first with incumbent Augie Galan, posting a .274 batting average with four home runs and 29 runs batted in in 55 games.

Stevens became a regular in 1946, ending with a .242 and 60 RBI in 103 games, while his 10 home runs were the second-highest on the team, being surpassed only by Pete Reiser (11).

Although he had been the regular in that season, Stevens was replaced at first base by Jackie Robinson in 1947. He appeared in just five games and was sent to Triple-A Montreal Royals, where he hit .290 with 27 homers and 108 RBI in 133 games. During the off-season, he was purchased along with Stan Rojek by the Pirates from the Dodgers.

Stevens opened 1948 with Pittsburgh, where he replaced retired Hank Greenberg. As a regular at first base, he posted career numbers in games (128), at-bats (468), runs, hits, RBI (69) and matched his career-best of 10 home runs, which were third-best on the team.

Stevens was used sparingly for the next two seasons before returning to the minors in 1951. He finished with a .252 average in 375 major league games.

In parts of 16 minor league seasons spanning 1941 to 1961, Stevens belted 257 home runs and drove in 1013 runs, while collecting a slash line (BA/OBP/SLG) of .275/.347/.457 in 1865 games.

Following his playing days, Stevens went on to a long career as a coach, which included working with the San Diego Padres in part of the 1981 season in order for him to qualify for pension benefits, and scouting.

Stevens was still doing the latter until he retired in 1989.

In 2009, he gained induction into the International League Hall of Fame.

Stevens was a longtime resident of Houston, Texas, where he died in 2012 at the age of 87.
