= Joe Hatten =

American baseball player (1916–1988)

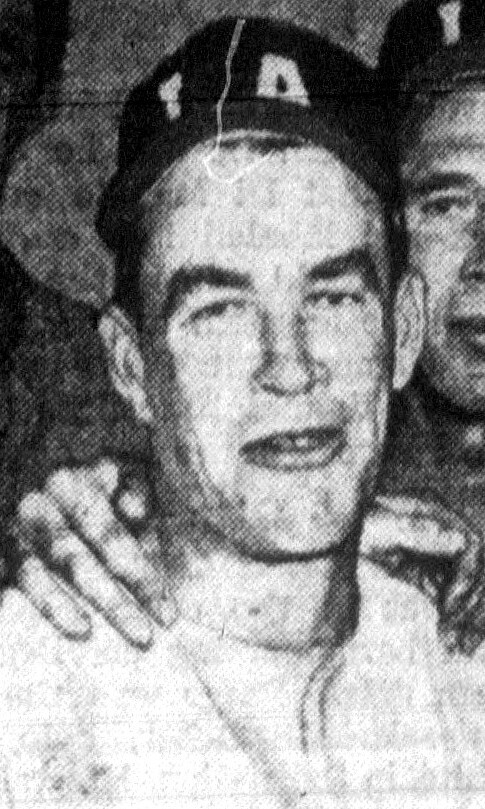
- Hatten in 1953
- Pitcher
- Born: November 7, 1916; Bancroft, Iowa, U.S.
- Died: December 16, 1988 (aged 72); Redding, California, U.S.
- Batted: Right Threw: Left

MLB debut
- April 21, 1946, for the Brooklyn Dodgers

Last MLB appearance
- July 4, 1952, for the Chicago Cubs

MLB statistics
- Win–loss record: 65–49
- Earned run average: 3.87
- Strikeouts: 381
- Stats at Baseball Reference

Teams
- Brooklyn Dodgers (1946–1951); Chicago Cubs (1951–1952)

Joseph Hilarian Hatten (November 7, 1916 – December 16, 1988) was an American professional baseball pitcher who appeared in 233 games pitched in Major League Baseball for the Brooklyn Dodgers and Chicago Cubs from 1946 to mid-1952. Born in Bancroft, Iowa, he threw left-handed, batted right-handed and was listed as 6 feet (1.8 m) tall and 176 pounds (80 kg).

== Baseball career ==
=== Minor leagues and military service ===
Hatten started in pro ball at age 20 with Crookston in the old Northern League in 1937. Acquired by the Montreal Royals from the Minneapolis Millers of the American Association in the 1941–42 off-season, Hatten pitched for the Royals briefly in 1942 before entering the U.S. Navy.

=== Brooklyn Dodgers ===
Upon his discharge four years later, he first saw service with the Brooklyn Dodgers. Possessing a "rubber arm", Hatten worked as both a starting pitcher and a reliever, even appearing in both ends of a double-header.

Hatten's first year in the big leagues in 1946 saw him post a 14–11 won-lost record with a 2.84 ERA, eighth-best in the National League. He followed that season with a career-high 17 wins, eight losses and a 3.63 ERA. Hatten often had trouble controlling his pitches, as he allowed the second-most bases on balls in each of his first two seasons with the Dodgers, walking 110 batters in 1946 and 105 in 1947. He also led the National League in hit batsmen with seven in 1946. In 1948, Hatten threw 51 pitches in a five-inning complete game shutout against Cincinnati, the fewest pitches for a complete game in major league history. Later that same season, Hatten threw 211 pitches in a 12 2/3-inning complete game in the first game of a doubleheader against the New York Giants but took the loss after allowing 2 runs (1 earned and 1 unearned). His 211 pitches are the most by a pitcher in a single game in which pitch volume was tracked.

The Dodgers won the 1947 and 1949 NL pennants during Hatten's stay, and he would appear in six World Series games, all against the New York Yankees. In 1947, he started Game 3 at Ebbets Field. Staked to a 6–0 lead after two innings and a 9–4 advantage after four, Hatten was driven from the contest with one out in the fifth after allowing a two-run home run to Joe DiMaggio. Brooklyn held on to win, 9–8, but the victory was awarded to relief ace Hugh Casey. His other five Fall Classic appearances would come in relief, three in 1947 and two in 1949. Over Hatten's six games pitched, he did not earn a decision or a save; in 102/3 total innings, he allowed ten earned runs on 16 hits and nine bases on balls, striking out five. His career World Series earned run average was 8.44.

=== Chicago Cubs ===
Hatten won 59 games (losing 39) for the Dodgers between 1946 and June 1951, when he was sent to the Chicago Cubs as part of a blockbuster mid-season trade that delivered slugging outfielder Andy Pafko to Brooklyn. He finished his MLB career by going 6–10 for the Cubs through July 1952.

=== MLB statistics ===
During his 233-game MLB career, Hatten compiled a record of 65–49 with a 3.87 ERA. He registered 51 complete games and eight shutouts in 149 career starts, and four saves in 84 relief assignments. In 1,087 innings pitched, he allowed 1,124 hits and 492 walks, with 381 strikeouts. Hatten pitched in the high minors into 1960, and was 43 years old when he retired from the mound.

He died at age 72 in Redding, California.

Preceded by Hal Gregg	Brooklyn Dodgers Opening Day; Starting pitcher 1947	Succeeded by Rex Barney
Preceded by Rex Barney	Brooklyn Dodgers Opening Day; Starting pitcher 1949	Succeeded by Don Newcombe
