= Johnny Van Cuyk =

American baseball player (1921-2010)

- Relief pitcher
- Born: July 7, 1921; Little Chute, Wisconsin, U.S.
- Died: July 10, 2010 (aged 89); Rochester, Minnesota, U.S.
- Batted: Left Threw: Left

MLB debut
- September 18, 1947, for the Brooklyn Dodgers

Last MLB appearance
- May 9, 1949, for the Brooklyn Dodgers

MLB statistics
- Win–loss record: 0-0
- Earned run average: 5.23
- Strikeouts: 3
- Stats at Baseball Reference

Teams
- Brooklyn Dodgers (1947–49)

John Henry Van Cuyk (July 7, 1921 – July 10, 2010) was an American relief pitcher in Major League Baseball who played from 1947 through 1949 for the Brooklyn Dodgers. Listed at 6 ft 1 in (1.85 m), 190 lb., he batted and threw left-handed. His younger brother, Chris Van Cuyk, also pitched in the majors.

A native of Little Chute, Wisconsin, to Henry and Anna Van Cuyk, he grew up in the close village of Kimberly, where he attended school. He started his professional career in 1940 with Class-D Appleton Papermakers, playing for them in part of two seasons before serving stateside in the United States Army during World War II from 1941 to 1945.

Van Cuyk entered the majors in 1947 with the Brooklyn Dodgers, pitching in seven games for them in part of three seasons. He posted a 5.53 earned run average and did not have a decision or save, allowing seven runs (six earned) on four hits while walking three and striking out three in 10.1 innings of work. He also saw time at the minor league level with the Montreal Royals (1946), St. Paul Saints (1947-'49) and Oakland Oaks (1950-'51), combining to go 77–68 with a 4.00 ERA in 330 pitching appearances (114 starts) during a 10-year career.

Following his baseball career, Van Cuyk went into real estate and car sales. He was a longtime resident of Rochester, Minnesota, where he died three days after his 89th birthday.
