= Curt Davis =

American baseball player (1903–1965)

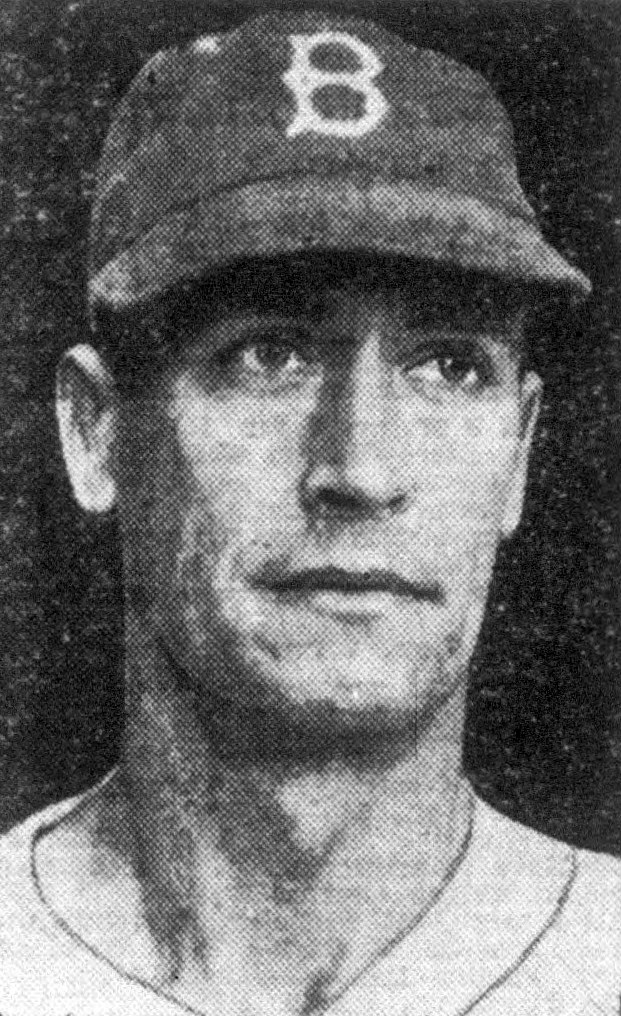
- Davis, circa 1943
- Pitcher
- Born: September 7, 1903; Greenfield, Missouri, U.S.
- Died: October 12, 1965 (aged 62); Covina, California, U.S.
- Batted: Right Threw: Right

MLB debut
- April 21, 1934, for the Philadelphia Phillies

Last MLB appearance
- April 28, 1946, for the Brooklyn Dodgers

MLB statistics
- Win–loss record: 158–131
- Earned run average: 3.42
- Strikeouts: 684
- Stats at Baseball Reference

Teams
- Philadelphia Phillies (1934–1936); Chicago Cubs (1936–1937); St. Louis Cardinals (1938–1940); Brooklyn Dodgers (1940–1946)

Career highlights and awards
- 2× All-Star (1936, 1939)

Curtis Benton Davis (September 7, 1903 – October 12, 1965) was an American Major League Baseball pitcher. Even though he did not reach the big leagues until he was 30, the right-hander was a two-time National League All-Star over a 13-year career spread among the Philadelphia Phillies (1934–1936), Chicago Cubs (1936–1937), St. Louis Cardinals (1938–1940) and Brooklyn Dodgers (1940–1946).

The Greenfield, Missouri, native had quite a list of accomplishments, including winning 19 games as a rookie, 22 games in 1939, eleven double-digit victory seasons, and pitching in the 1941 World Series. He had excellent control, leading the NL in BB/9IP in 1938 and 1941, and finishing in the top ten in the league ten times.

== Career ==
Nicknamed "Coonskin”, Davis stood 6 feet 2 inches (1.88 m) tall and weighed 185 pounds (84 kg). He began his career in professional baseball in 1928 at the age of 24 with the Salt Lake City Bees of the Class C Utah–Idaho League, and promptly won 16 of 30 decisions. The following year, he jumped all the way to the top minor-league level as a member of the San Francisco Seals of the Pacific Coast League. In five seasons in San Francisco, he won 90 games and lost 77. Then he was selected on October 2, 1933, by the Phillies in that year's Rule 5 draft.

As a rookie in 1934, he won 19 games (losing 17) for a Phillies club that won only 56 of 149 games—accounting for 34 percent of the club's victories. The following year, he went 16–14 for another futile Phillies team. His fortunes improved when, in May 1936, he was acquired by the first-division Cubs, for whom he went 21–14 in 52 games over a season and a half and made the 1936 All-Star team. Appearing in that season's Midsummer Classic, played at Braves Field, Boston, Davis entered the contest in the seventh inning with his side ahead, 4–0. But he gave up a home run to Lou Gehrig, the first batter he faced, and singles to Baseball Hall of Famers Goose Goslin, Jimmie Foxx and Luke Appling; he retired two other Hall of Famers, Earl Averill and Bill Dickey, but had to be relieved by Lonnie Warneke with the National League margin cut to only one run. Warneke nailed down the save, however, and the NL hung on to win, 4–3.

On April 16, 1938, he was one of the Cubs' players who were involved in the trade that brought future Hall of Fame pitcher Dizzy Dean from the Cardinals; the Cubs won the 1938 National League pennant, but Davis would enjoy a stellar 1939 campaign in St. Louis, going 22–16 (3.63) and finishing third in the Senior Circuit in wins and saves and fifth in shutouts. He made the NL All-Star squad for a second time.

Then, the following year, on June 12, 1940, he was traded to Brooklyn with future Hall of Fame slugger Joe Medwick for four players and $125,000, in one of the highest-profile transactions of the baseball season. He won 13 games in 1941 as the Dodgers captured their first pennant since 1920. Then he started Game 1 of the 1941 World Series against the New York Yankees, surrendering six hits and three earned runs in 51/3 innings pitched. He was charged with the 3–2 Brooklyn defeat in what would be his only World Series appearance.

In 1942, Davis almost pitched the Dodgers to their second successive National League title. He won 15 of 21 decisions, posted a 2.36 earned run average, third in the NL, and led the Brooklyn staff with five shutouts. But the Cardinals overcame the Dodgers in a furious pennant race, and Davis' club finished out of the postseason. He remained a Dodger throughout the World War II era, winning ten games during each of the 1943–1945 seasons. After pitching one game in 1946 (on April 28), he was released by Brooklyn three days later.

Career totals for his 429 games pitched include a 158–131 record, 281 games started, 141 complete games, 24 shutouts, 111 games finished, 33 saves, and an ERA of 3.42 in 2,325 innings pitched. Other top ten rankings for Davis include wins (four times), winning percentage (four times), ERA (four times), H/9IP (three times), WHIP (five times), shutouts (five times), saves (five times), games finished (once), and oldest player (five times).

An excellent hitter for a pitcher, Davis had a .203 career batting average (165-813) with 70 runs, 11 home runs and 81 RBI. He hit .300 (12-40) with the Cubs in 1937 and .381 (40-105) with 17 RBI with the Cardinals in 1939.

Davis died at the age of 62 in Covina, California.

Sporting positions
Preceded by Whit Wyatt	Brooklyn Dodgers Opening Day; Starting pitcher 1942	Succeeded by Ed Head
Preceded by Hal Gregg	Brooklyn Dodgers Opening Day; Starting pitcher 1945	Succeeded by Hal Gregg
Preceded by Herman Franks	St. Paul Saints (1901–1960) manager 1947	Succeeded by Walter Alston
