= East Glenn, Indiana =

- Unincorporated community
- Vigo County's location in Indiana

- location in Vigo County, Indiana
- Coordinates: 39°29′09″N 87°17′44″W
- Country: United States
- State: Indiana
- County: Vigo
- Township: Lost Creek
- Elevation: 564 ft (172 m)
- Time zone: UTC-5 (Eastern (EST))
  - Summer (DST): UTC-4 (EDT)
- ZIP code: 47803
- Area codes: 812, 930
- GNIS feature ID: 433907

East Glenn is an unincorporated community in central Lost Creek Township, Vigo County, in the U.S. state of Indiana.

Just outside the boundaries of Terre Haute, it is also part of the Terre Haute metropolitan area.

== Geography ==
East Glenn is located at 39°29′09″N 87°17′44″W at an elevation of 562 feet.
