= Ed Chandler =

American baseball player (1917-2003)

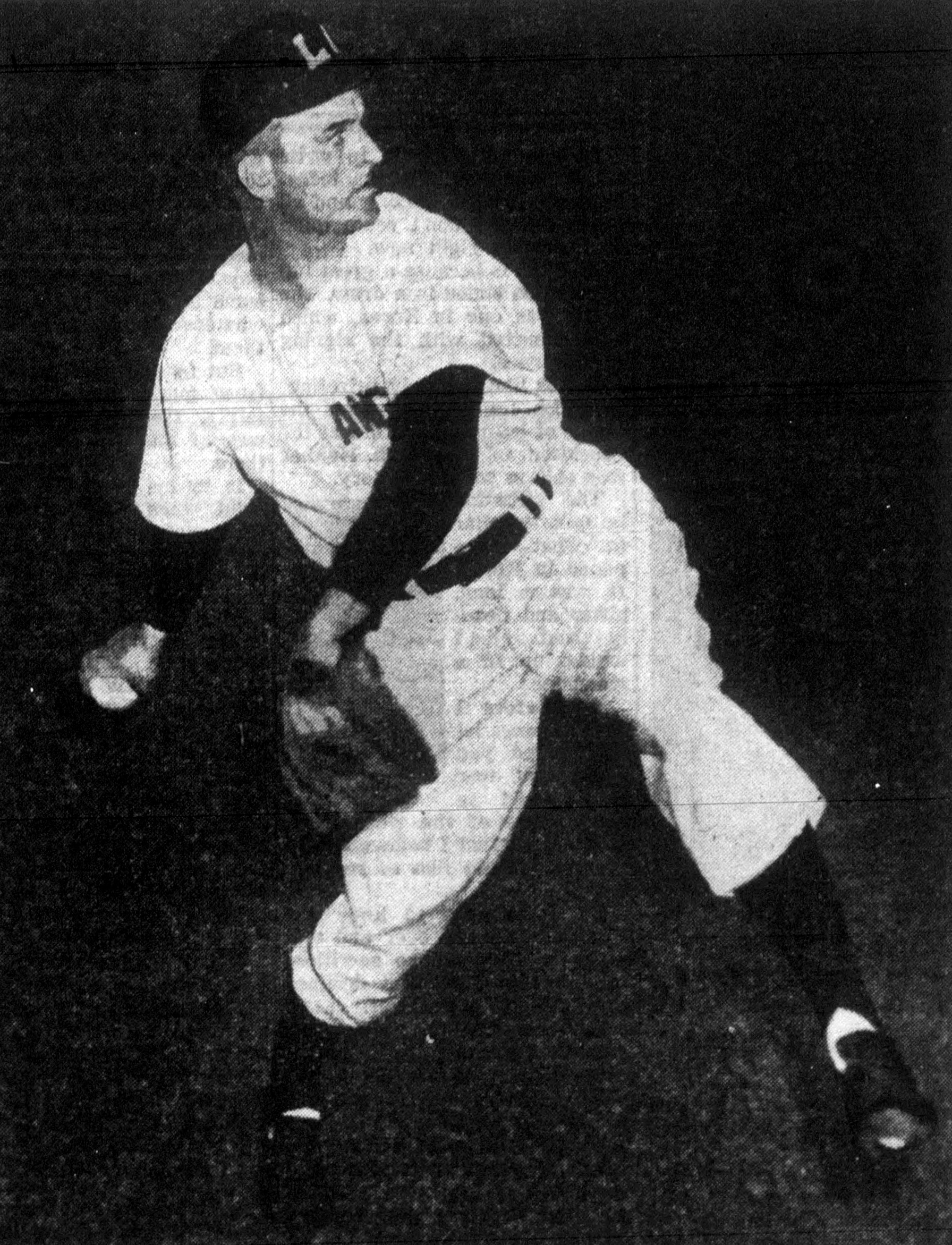
- Chandler, circa 1953
- Pitcher
- Born: February 17, 1917; Pinson, Alabama, U.S.
- Died: July 6, 2003 (aged 86); Las Vegas, Nevada, U.S.
- Batted: Right Threw: Right

MLB debut
- April 18, 1947, for the Brooklyn Dodgers

Last MLB appearance
- June 14, 1947, for the Brooklyn Dodgers

MLB statistics
- Win–loss record: 0–1
- Earned run average: 6.37
- Strikeouts: 8
- Stats at Baseball Reference

Teams
- Brooklyn Dodgers (1947)

Edward Oliver Chandler (February 17, 1917 – July 6, 2003) was an American pitcher in Major League Baseball. He pitched in fifteen games for the Brooklyn Dodgers during the 1947 baseball season.

Born in Pinson, Alabama, Chandler's family was huge, with him being one of 14 sons. His father was William M, and his mother was Susie Caroline Chandler.
