= Hugh Casey (baseball) =

American baseball player (1913–1951)

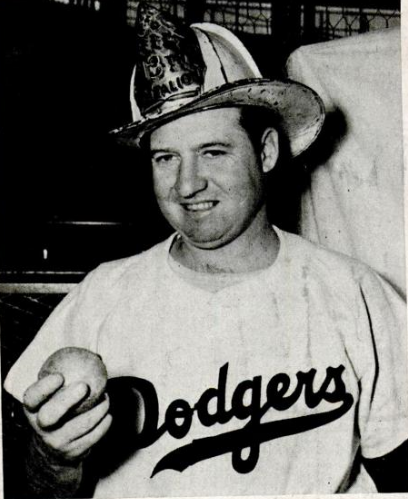
- Casey in 1948
- Pitcher
- Born: October 14, 1913; Atlanta, Georgia, U.S.
- Died: July 3, 1951 (aged 37); Atlanta, Georgia, U.S.
- Batted: Right Threw: Right

MLB debut
- April 29, 1935, for the Chicago Cubs

Last MLB appearance
- September 23, 1949, for the New York Yankees

MLB statistics
- Win–loss record: 75–42
- Earned run average: 3.45
- Strikeouts: 349
- Saves: 54
- Stats at Baseball Reference

Teams
- Chicago Cubs (1935); Brooklyn Dodgers (1939–1942, 1946–1948); Pittsburgh Pirates (1949); New York Yankees (1949)

Career highlights and awards
- 2× NL saves leader (1942, 1947)

Hugh Thomas Casey (October 14, 1913 – July 3, 1951) was an American Major League Baseball pitcher. He played for the Chicago Cubs (1935), Brooklyn Dodgers (1939–42 and 1946–48), Pittsburgh Pirates (1949), and New York Yankees (1949).

== Baseball career ==
Casey was born in Atlanta in 1913. He started his professional baseball career with the Atlanta Crackers of the Southern Association at the age of 18. Except for a brief stint with the Chicago Cubs in 1935, he pitched mostly in the minor leagues from 1932 to 1938.

After going 13–14 for Memphis in 1938, Casey was drafted by the Brooklyn Dodgers. He was a starter and reliever for the Dodgers from 1939 to 1941, winning over 10 games each season. In 1941, Casey helped the Dodgers win the National League championship. He is perhaps best known for an alleged wild pitch that he threw in the ninth inning of Game 4 in the 1941 World Series which precipitated a New York Yankees rally. Catcher Mickey Owen thought that the pitch was a spitball, but Casey always swore it was not. Officially, the play was recorded as a passed ball. Brooklyn lost the game and, eventually, the series. Casey went 0–2.

Casey was used mostly as a reliever in 1942 and led the league in saves. In January 1943, during World War II, Casey entered the United States Navy. He was discharged in December 1945. Upon his return to the Dodgers, he had two good seasons in 1946 and 1947. In 1947, Casey led the National League in saves for the second time. He pitched well in the 1947 World Series, going 2–0 with a save, but the Dodgers lost in seven games.

Like many of the colorful Dodger players during that era, Casey had his share of adventure. His teammates later recalled a time in which he sparred with writer Ernest Hemingway in Hemingway's house.

After 1947, Casey lost his effectiveness, and his major league career ended in 1949. He went 10–4 for his old team, the Crackers, in 1950; Atlanta won the pennant.

== Later life ==
Towards the end of his life, Casey ran a restaurant in Brooklyn.

On July 3, 1951, Casey died in Atlanta from a self-inflicted shotgun blast to the neck while his estranged wife was pleading with him on the phone. Casey was upset that he had recently been named as the father of a child by another woman in a paternity suit. He was 37 years old.

Casey was inducted into the Georgia Sports Hall of Fame in 1991.

== See also ==
- List of Major League Baseball annual saves leaders
