= Gene Hermanski =

American baseball player (1920–2010)

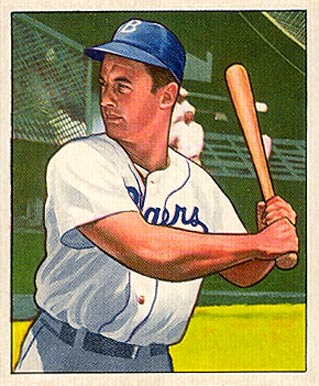
- Outfielder
- Born: May 11, 1920; Pittsfield, Massachusetts, U.S.
- Died: August 9, 2010 (aged 90); Homosassa Springs, Florida, U.S.
- Batted: Left Threw: Right

MLB debut
- August 14, 1943, for the Brooklyn Dodgers

Last MLB appearance
- September 22, 1953, for the Pittsburgh Pirates

MLB statistics
- Batting average: .272
- Home runs: 46
- Runs batted in: 259
- Stats at Baseball Reference

Teams
- Brooklyn Dodgers (1943, 1946–1951); Chicago Cubs (1951–1953); Pittsburgh Pirates (1953)

Eugene Victor Hermanski (May 11, 1920 – August 9, 2010) was an American Major League Baseball outfielder. A native of Pittsfield, Massachusetts, he attended Seton Hall University.

Signed by the Philadelphia Athletics as an amateur free agent in 1939, Hermanski made his Major League Baseball debut with the Brooklyn Dodgers on August 14, 1943, and appeared in his final game on September 22, 1953.

The Salem (Massachusetts) Evening News, reported on August 8, 1943, that the then-22-year-old outfielder, recently released from the USCG Salem Air Station in order to enlist in the USN's V-5 Aviation Training Program, was expected to use a month-long break to play for the Brooklyn Dodgers. "Hermanski hit a homer and two triples in an exhibition game with the Red Sox and poled out a homer and a double in a contest with the Braves."

When Hermanski played for the Brooklyn Dodgers along with Jackie Robinson, he demonstrated he was a great teammate by suggesting that all of the players stand in solidarity by wearing No. 42 to confuse potential snipers who were said to be out to kill Robinson because he had broken the color barrier.

Hermanski died in Homosassa Springs, Florida, at the age of 90.

== Career statistics ==
In a 739 game major league career spanning nine seasons, Hermanski posted a .272 batting average (533-for-1960) with 276 runs, 46 home runs and 259 RBI. Playing primarily left and right field, he recorded a .977 fielding percentage. In two World Series (1947 & '49), he hit .219 (7-for-32) with 5 runs and 3 RBI.
