= Ewell Blackwell =

American baseball player (1922–1996)

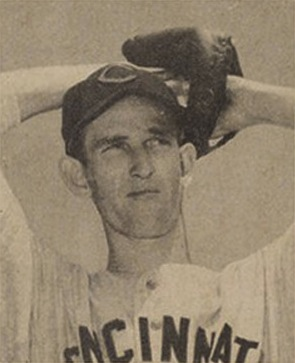
- Pitcher
- Born: October 23, 1922; Fresno, California, U.S.
- Died: October 29, 1996 (aged 74); Hendersonville, North Carolina, U.S.
- Batted: Right Threw: Right

MLB debut
- April 21, 1942, for the Cincinnati Reds

Last MLB appearance
- April 18, 1955, for the Kansas City Athletics

MLB statistics
- Win–loss record: 82–78
- Earned run average: 3.30
- Strikeouts: 839
- Stats at Baseball Reference

Teams
- Cincinnati Reds (1942, 1946–1952); New York Yankees (1952–1953); Kansas City Athletics (1955)

Career highlights and awards
- 6× All-Star (1946–1951); World Series champion (1952); NL wins leader (1947); NL strikeout leader (1947); Pitched a no-hitter on June 18, 1947; Cincinnati Reds Hall of Fame

Ewell Blackwell (October 23, 1922 – October 29, 1996) was an American right-handed starting pitcher in Major League Baseball. Nicknamed "The Whip" for his sidearm, snap-delivery, Blackwell played for the Cincinnati Reds for most of his career (1942; 1946–52). He also played with the New York Yankees (1952–53) and finished his career with the Kansas City Athletics (1955).

== Baseball career ==
The 6 ft 6 in (1.98 m), 195 lb (88 kg) Blackwell is considered to have been one of the greatest pitchers of his era, and starred in a six-year streak in the All-Star Game from 1946 through 1951. He was the winning pitcher of the 1950 All-Star Game, getting Joe DiMaggio to ground into a game-ending double play in the 14th inning.

On June 18, 1947, Blackwell pitched a 6–0 no-hitter against the Boston Braves. In his next start, June 22, against the Brooklyn Dodgers, he took a no-hitter into the ninth inning, trying to tie the achievement of his veteran Reds teammate Johnny Vander Meer from nine years earlier, of throwing consecutive no-hitters. However, the no-hit attempt was broken up by Eddie Stanky. The Reds won the game 4–0.

In a 10-season career, Blackwell posted an 82–78 record with 839 strikeouts and a 3.30 ERA in 1,321 innings pitched. In 1960, he was just the eighth player ever to be inducted into the Cincinnati Reds Hall of Fame. During a 2007 New York Mets broadcast, Blackwell was referred to as the best right-handed pitcher ever by Hall of Famer Ralph Kiner. Both Kiner and Hall of Fame catcher Roy Campanella called Blackwell the toughest pitcher they ever faced. Dodgers broadcaster Vin Scully also reported that batters were genuinely afraid to face him.

Blackwell's best year was 1947, when he recorded 22 wins against 8 losses, including 16 consecutive complete game victories for a weak-hitting team. At a slender 6 ft 6 inches, he was one of the first very tall pitchers, and a fearsome sight to hitters of that era. His bizarre sidearm delivery, described by a leading sports pundit as "looking like a man falling out of a tree", put unusual strain on his arm, abbreviating his success and, ultimately, his career. Along with arm problems, Blackwell had his right kidney removed in January 1949 after it became infected, and then had an emergency appendectomy in September 1950.

Alvin Dark thought Blackwell was the best pitcher in the NL for a brief interval. "It was difficult to pick up the ball in his windup–he'd curl his arm behind his back, and you'd get a glimpse of it there, and that's the last you'd see until it was coming at you."

In 1953 with the Yankees, Blackwell won both of his decisions but retired on July 6 because his arm "hurt too much." He said that he would rest the arm, then try to pitch again the next season, and he wound up playing one more year in 1955 for the Kansas City Athletics.

In 1948, Ziff-Davis Publishing Company published The Secrets of Pitching, By Ewell Blackwell, a short book giving advice for young pitchers.

== Military service ==
From 1943 to 1946 during World War II, Blackwell served with the United States Army in Europe where he worked as a mess sergeant. When not cooking, he had time to play baseball and conduct instructional camps with European youth prior to his March 1946 discharge.

== See also ==
- List of Major League Baseball no-hitters

Preceded by Bob Feller	No-hitter pitcher June 18, 1947	Succeeded by Don Black
