= Rex Barney =

American baseball player (1924-1997)

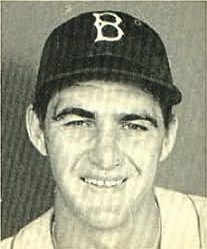
- Barney in 1948
- Pitcher
- Born: December 19, 1924; Omaha, Nebraska, U.S.
- Died: August 12, 1997 (aged 72); Baltimore, Maryland, U.S.
- Batted: Right Threw: Right

MLB debut
- August 18, 1943, for the Brooklyn Dodgers

Last MLB appearance
- September 4, 1950, for the Brooklyn Dodgers

MLB statistics
- Win–loss record: 35–31
- Earned run average: 4.31
- Strikeouts: 336
- Stats at Baseball Reference

Teams
- Brooklyn Dodgers (1943, 1946–1950)

Career highlights and awards
- Pitched a no-hitter on September 9, 1948; Baltimore Orioles Hall of Fame

Rex Edward Barney (December 19, 1924 – August 12, 1997) was an American Major League Baseball pitcher for the Brooklyn Dodgers in 1943 and from 1946 through 1950.

As a teenage phenom, Barney was signed by the Dodgers at the age of 18, in 1943. He pitched 45 innings that year.

Enlisting in the Army in 1943, Barney eventually served in Europe, receiving two Purple Hearts and the Bronze Star Medal.

Barney returned to the majors in 1946. He was one of the hardest throwers in the league but struggled with wildness early in his career. In 1948, however, he gained control of his fastball and had his greatest season; he won 15 games and finished second in the National League with 138 strikeouts. The highlight was hurling a no-hitter against the New York Giants on September 9. He had to sit through a one-hour rain delay and showers in the 7th, 8th, and 9th innings to finish the game. The next season, Barney pitched semi-effectively while suffering lingering effects from a leg injury suffered while sliding into second base.

Barney appeared in 3 games in the 1947 World Series – starting and losing the fifth game – against the New York Yankees. He got knocked out early in his 1949 World Series start, also against the Yankees, after just 2 2/3 innings. In 1950, he walked 48 batters in just 33 innings and never played in the majors again. He ended his career with a 35–31 record and a 4.31 earned run average.

After his retirement as a player, Barney briefly worked as a broadcaster, calling games for Mutual radio in 1958. That same year he also teamed with Al Helfer to call several Philadelphia Phillies games on New York station WOR-TV, helping to fill that city's void of National League baseball following the departure of the Dodgers and Giants to the West Coast.

Barney also teamed with Ted Patterson in 1982 and 1983 to cablecast 16 Baltimore Orioles games per year on the SuperTV channel.

Barney was the public address announcer for the Baltimore Orioles for 24 years. He was known for his signature "Thank Youuuuuuu" and "Give that fan a contract," when someone would catch a foul ball.

== See also ==
- List of Major League Baseball no-hitters

Achievements
Preceded by Bob Lemon	No-hitter pitcher September 9, 1948	Succeeded by Vern Bickford
Sporting positions
Preceded by Joe Hatten	Brooklyn Dodgers Opening Day; Starting pitcher 1948	Succeeded by Joe Hatten
