= Hank Behrman =

American baseball player (1921–1987)

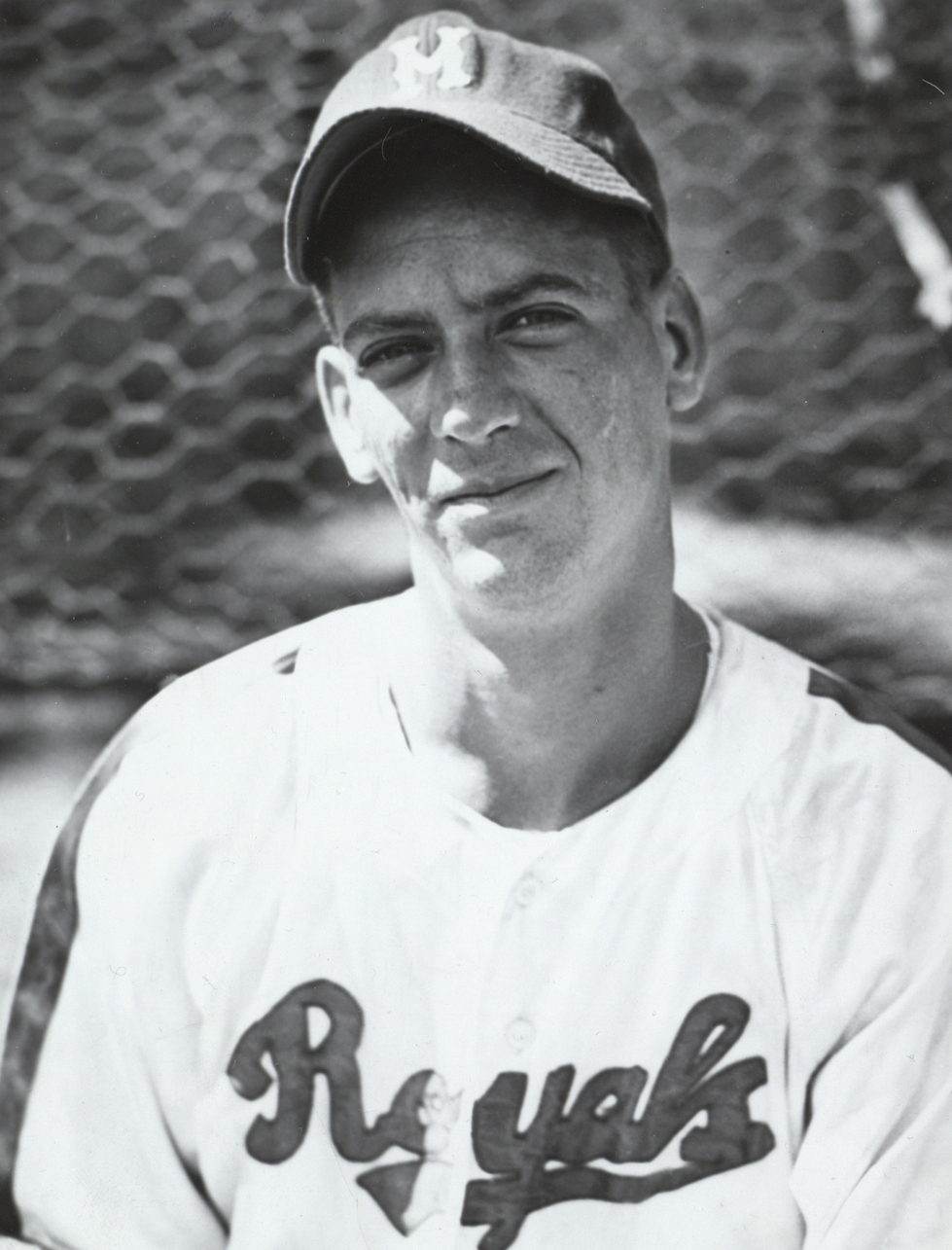
- Pitcher
- Born: June 27, 1921; Brooklyn, New York, U.S.
- Died: January 20, 1987 (aged 65); New York City, U.S.
- Batted: Right Threw: Right

MLB debut
- April 17, 1946, for the Brooklyn Dodgers

Last MLB appearance
- September 18, 1949, for the New York Giants

MLB statistics
- Win–loss record: 24–17
- Earned run average: 4.40
- Strikeouts: 189
- Stats at Baseball Reference

Teams
- Brooklyn Dodgers (1946–1947); Pittsburgh Pirates (1947); Brooklyn Dodgers (1947–1948); New York Giants (1949)

Henry Bernard Behrman (June 27, 1921 – January 20, 1987) was an American pitcher in Major League Baseball. He pitched from 1946 to 1949 with the Brooklyn Dodgers, Pittsburgh Pirates and New York Giants. He appeared in 5 games for the Dodgers during the 1947 World Series.

The right-handed pitcher had his best season as a rookie with the Brooklyn Dodgers in 1946 with an 11–5 record, a 2.93 earned run average and 150 innings pitched. On May 3, 1947, Behrman was traded with pitchers Kirby Higbe and Cal McLish, infielder Gene Mauch and catcher Dixie Howell to the Pittsburgh Pirates for outfielder Al Gionfriddo and $100,000. Then he was sent back to the Dodgers for cash on June 14 of that year. He was sold to the New York Giants on February 26, 1949, and closed his four-year career with them. He was 24–17 lifetime, with half of his wins coming in relief, a 4.40 earned run average and 19 saves.
