= Pete Reiser =

American baseball player and coach (1919–1981)

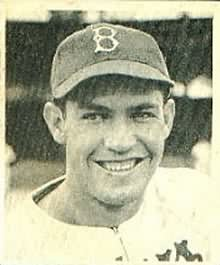
- Reiser in 1948
- Outfielder
- Born: March 17, 1919; St. Louis, Missouri, U.S.
- Died: October 25, 1981 (aged 62); Palm Springs, California, U.S.
- Batted: Left Threw: Right

MLB debut
- July 23, 1940, for the Brooklyn Dodgers

Last MLB appearance
- July 5, 1952, for the Cleveland Indians

MLB statistics
- Batting average: .295
- Home runs: 58
- Runs batted in: 368
- Stats at Baseball Reference

Teams
- Brooklyn Dodgers (1940–1942, 1946–1948); Boston Braves (1949–1950); Pittsburgh Pirates (1951); Cleveland Indians (1952)

Career highlights and awards
- 3× All-Star (1941, 1942, 1946); World Series champion (1963); NL batting champion (1941); 2× NL stolen base leader (1942, 1946)

Harold Patrick Reiser (March 17, 1919 – October 25, 1981), nicknamed "Pistol Pete", was an American professional baseball outfielder and coach, who played in Major League Baseball (MLB), during the 1940s and early 1950s. While known primarily for his time with the Brooklyn Dodgers, Reiser later played for the Boston Braves, Pittsburgh Pirates, and Cleveland Indians.

== Early career ==
A native of St. Louis, Missouri, Reiser signed with his hometown Cardinals, but at age 19 he was among a group of minor league players declared free agents by Commissioner of Baseball Kenesaw Mountain Landis. Reportedly, Cardinal general manager Branch Rickey—mortified at losing a player of Reiser's caliber—arranged for the Dodgers to sign Reiser, hide him in the minors, then trade him back to St. Louis at a later date. But Reiser's stellar performances in spring training in both 1939 and 1940 forced the Dodgers to keep him. (Rickey would become GM of the Dodgers after the 1942 season and witness Reiser's injury-caused decline as a great talent.)

=== Derailed by injuries ===
In 1941, his first season as a regular starter, Reiser helped the Dodgers win the pennant for the first time since 1920. A sensation his second year, he won the National League batting title while leading the league in doubles, triples, total bases, runs scored, and slugging percentage. He was also named a starter to the All-Star team and placed second in MVP balloting. On July 19 of the following year, Reiser crashed face-first into the outfield wall in St. Louis, trying to catch what turned out to be a game-winning inside-the-park home run by Enos Slaughter of the rival Cardinals in the bottom of the 11th inning. The loss cut the Dodgers' lead over the Cardinals to six games.

Despite missing just four games with the resulting concussion, he batted only .244 over his final 48 games that season, dropping his batting average from .350 to .310 for the year. The Dodgers ended up losing the pennant by two games to the Cardinals, who won 20 of their last 23 games and eventually the World Series.

Reiser gave great effort on every play in the field, and was therefore very injury-prone. He fractured his skull running into an outfield wall on one occasion (but still made the throw back to the infield), was temporarily paralyzed on another, and was taken off the field on a stretcher nearly a dozen times.

Leo Durocher, who was Reiser's first major league manager, reflected many years later that in terms of talent, skill and potential, there was only one other player comparable to Reiser: Willie Mays. He also said, "Pete had more power than Willie—left-handed and right-handed both. Willie had everything, Pete had everything but luck."

Reiser served in the United States Army during World War II, playing baseball for Army teams. While serving, he was injured again and had to learn to throw with both arms.

When Reiser returned to the majors in 1946, he was still suffering from a shoulder injury from playing Army baseball. He later said: "It wasn't as serious as the head injuries, but it did more to end my career. The shoulder kept popping out of place, more bone chips developed, and there was constant pain in the arm and shoulder."

He was never the same hitter he was early in his career, but was still as fast as ever, leading the NL in stolen bases and stealing home a record seven times in 1946. In 1948, Ebbets Field became the first ballpark with padded outfield walls due to Reiser's penchant for running into them.

== Later life ==
Reiser managed in the minors for several years (including the Kokomo Dodgers in 1956–57, among others), winning the 1959 Minor League Manager of the Year Award from The Sporting News. He served as a coach on Los Angeles Dodger manager Walter Alston's staff from 1960 to 1964 (including the 1963 world championship team). However, he was forced out in 1965 as manager of the AAA Spokane Indians as the result of a heart attack. His replacement was Duke Snider—the man who had once replaced him as Brooklyn Dodger center fielder.

When Leo Durocher became manager of the Chicago Cubs in 1966, he brought many of his former players to coach on his staff. Reiser was one of them (1966–1969; 1972–1974). He also coached for the California Angels in 1970–71.

In 1981, Lawrence Ritter and Donald Honig included him in their book "The 100 Greatest Baseball Players of All Time." They used what they called "Smoky Joe Wood Syndrome" to explain why a truly exceptional player whose career was curtailed by injury—despite not having had career statistics that would rank him with the all-time greats—should nonetheless be included on their list.

Reiser died in Palm Springs, California, of respiratory disease at 62, and was buried at Desert Memorial Park in Cathedral City, California.

== See also ==
- List of Major League Baseball batting champions
- List of Major League Baseball annual runs scored leaders
- List of Major League Baseball annual stolen base leaders
- List of Major League Baseball annual doubles leaders
- List of Major League Baseball annual triples leaders
