= Hal Gregg =

American baseball player (1921–1991)

- Pitcher
- Born: July 11, 1921; Anaheim, California, U.S.
- Died: May 13, 1991 (aged 69); Bishop, California, U.S.
- Batted: Right Threw: Right

MLB debut
- August 18, 1943, for the Brooklyn Dodgers

Last MLB appearance
- August 17, 1952, for the New York Giants

MLB statistics
- Win–loss record: 40–48
- Earned run average: 4.54
- Strikeouts: 401
- Stats at Baseball Reference

Teams
- Brooklyn Dodgers (1943–1947); Pittsburgh Pirates (1948–1950); New York Giants (1952)

Career highlights and awards
- All-Star (1945)

Harold Dana Gregg (July 11, 1921 – May 13, 1991) was an American starting pitcher in Major League Baseball (MLB) who played for the Brooklyn Dodgers (1943–47), Pittsburgh Pirates (1948–50) and New York Giants (1952). Gregg batted and threw right-handed. He was born in Anaheim, California.

In a nine-season career, Gregg posted a 40–48 record with 401 strikeouts and a 4.54 ERA in 827 innings pitched.

In 1947 Gregg became an unlikely World Series figure. He had pitched very well in relief for Brooklyn, especially in the 4th game when Bill Bevens was hurling his 8 2/3 innings of no-hit ball only to lose in the 9th. Gregg relieved the starter in the 1st, got out of the jam with no runs, and pitched 7 innings holding the Yankees to 2 runs, working out of some more tough jams and keeping Brooklyn in the game. Since Brooklyn's manager had completely mishandled the pitching staff, continually using starters in relief, there was only Gregg ready to start game 7; Gregg thus joined some of the few but greatest pitchers in history who have started a World Series 7th game. Gregg, on two days' rest, lost, giving up 3 runs in 4 innings. He threw 12 innings in the series with 10 strikeouts including DiMaggio, who seldom struck out.

He was a better than average hitting pitcher in his career, compiling a .205 batting average (54-for-263) with 26 runs, 2 home runs and 15 RBI.

Gregg died in Bishop, California, aged 69.

== Best season ==
- 1945: 18 wins, 34 starts, 13 complete games, 139 strikeouts, 254 1/3 innings – all career-highs

== Highlights ==
- Was the winning pitcher against the Boston Braves, 5–3, during the historic debut of Jackie Robinson with the Brooklyn Dodgers (April 15, 1947)
- Pitched a one-hit, 1–0 shutout against the Philadelphia Phillies at Ebbets Field (April 22, 1947)
- The 1947 World Series. He led all Brooklyn pitchers in innings pitched and strikeouts with a memorable 4th game: 7IP, 4H 1R.

Sporting positions
Preceded by Ed Head	Brooklyn Dodgers Opening Day; Starting pitcher 1944	Succeeded by Curt Davis
Preceded by Curt Davis	Brooklyn Dodgers Opening Day; Starting pitcher 1946	Succeeded by Joe Hatten
