= Clancy =

Origin
- Language: Irish
- Meaning: "(son of the) red warrior"
- Region of origin: Ireland

Other names
- Variant form: Mac Fhlannchaidh

Clancy is an Irish name coming from the Gaelic Mac Fhlannchaidh/Mac Fhlannchadha, meaning "Son of the red/ruddy warrior" (Mac being for sons, Ní Fhlannchaidh/Ní Fhlannchadha would be for daughters), or as a hypocorism for Clarence. The surname originated from two different families, one in Thomond and one in the present day County Leitrim.

Notable people with the name include:

== People ==
=== Given name ===
- Clancy Barone (born 1963), American football coach
- Clancy Brown (born 1959), American actor
- Clancy Carlile (1930–1998), American novelist and screenwriter
- Clancy Chassay (born 1980), English journalist
- Clancy Cooper (1906–1975), American actor
- Clancy Eccles (1940–2005), Jamaican reggae singer
- Clancy Edwards (born 1955), American track and field sprinter
- Clancy Fernando (1938–1992), Sri Lankan admiral
- Clancy Hayes (1908–1972), American jazz singer and banjo player
- Clancy Imislund (died 2020) an influential figure in the Alcoholics Anonymous community and managing director of the Midnight Mission in Los Angeles
- Clancy Martin (born 1967), Canadian philosopher, novelist and essayist
- Clancy Newman (born 1977), American cellist and composer
- Clancy O'Connor (born 1982), American actor
- Clancy Pendergast (born 1967), American football coach
- Clancy Rudeforth (born 1983), Australian rules footballer
- Clancy Sigal (1926–2017), American writer
- Clancy Smyres (1922–2007), American baseball player
- Clancy Williams (1942–1986), American football player

=== Surname ===
- Abbey Clancy (born 1986), English model and television personality
- Aislinn Clancy (born 1979), Canadian politician
- Al Clancy (1888–1951), American baseball player
- Aoibheann Clancy (born 2003), Irish footballer
- Bill Clancy (1879–1948), American baseball player
- Bobby Clancy (1927–2002), Irish folk musician, one of the Clancy Brothers
- Boetius Clancy (died 1598), Irish Member of Parliament and High Sheriff
- Bud Clancy (1900–1968), American baseball player
- Carl Stearns Clancy (1890–1971), American long-distance motorcycle rider, film director and producer, credited with the first motorcycle circumnavigation of the world
- Claire Clancy (born 1958), former Chief Executive and Clerk to the National Assembly for Wales, and first woman to be Registrar of Companies for England and Wales
- Conor Clancy (Clare hurler) (born 1971), Irish hurler
- Conor Clancy (Offaly hurler) (born 1993), Irish hurler
- Cummin Clancy (1922–2013), Irish discus thrower
- Daniel J. Clancy (born 1964), American computer scientist
- Dave Clancy (born 1978), British ice hockey goaltender
- Dean Clancy (born 2001), Irish boxer
- Donald D. Clancy (1921–2007), American politician
- Ed or Edward Clancy (disambiguation)
- Finbarr Clancy (born 1970), Irish folk singer and musician, member of the High Kings
- Frank Willey Clancy (1852–1928), American lawyer and politician
- George Clancy (politician) (1881–1921), Irish teacher and politician
- George Clancy (rugby union) (born 1977), Irish rugby union referee
- Gil Clancy (1922–2011), American boxing trainer and commentator
- Gordon Drummond Clancy (1912–1996), Canadian politician
- Jack Clancy (born 1944), American football player
- Jack Clancy (Australian footballer) (1934–2014), Australian rules footballer
- James Clancy (disambiguation)
- Jim Clancy (baseball player) (1955–2025), American baseball pitcher
- Jim Clancy (journalist) (born 1955), American broadcast journalist
- Joe Clancy (born 1990), American football player and college coach
- John Clancy (disambiguation)
- Jonathan Clancy (born 1986), Irish hurler
- Joseph Clancy (disambiguation)
- J. J. Clancy (North Dublin MP) (1847–1928), Irish member of the British Parliament
- J. J. Clancy (Sinn Féin politician) (1891–1932)
- Kendrick Clancy (born 1978), American football player
- Kevin Clancy (born 1983), Scottish football referee
- Kevin Clancy (Royal Mint), British numismatist
- King Clancy (1902–1986), Canadian ice hockey defenceman, referee, coach and executive
- Laurence Clancy (1929–2014), British aerodynamicist, academic and author
- Liam Clancy (1935–2009), Irish folk musician, one of the Clancy Brothers
- Lindsay Clancy, mother accused of murdering her children
- Martin Clancy (fl. 1980s–present) Irish musician and songwriter and writer about artificial intelligence's impact on the arts
- Mary Clancy (born 1948), Canadian politician
- Matthew Clancy (born 1982), Irish retired Gaelic footballer
- Michael Clancy (1949–2010), Governor and Commander-in-Chief of St. Helena and Dependencies, husband of Claire Clancy
- Michael Martin Clancy (1868–1931), Irish Catholic priest in Australia
- Mike Clancy (1924–1988), American professional wrestler
- Mike Clancy (trade unionist), British trad unionist, General Secretary of Prospect (2012–present)
- Nadia Clancy (born 1986), Australian politician
- Natalie Clancy, Canadian journalist
- Paddy Clancy (1922–1998), Irish folk musician, one of the Clancy Brothers
- Pádraig Clancy (born 1980), Irish Gaelic footballer
- Pat Clancy (trade unionist) (1919–1987), Australian trade unionist and communist
- Patrick Clancy (Irish politician) (1877–1947)
- Patty Clancy, 21st century American politician
- Paulette Clancy, British physicist
- Pauric Clancy, Irish Gaelic football player
- Peadar Clancy (1888–1920), member of the Irish Republican Army
- Robert H. Clancy (1882–1962), American politician
- Robert Clancy (doctor), Australian clinical immunologist
- Ryan Clancy (born 1977), American politician
- Sam Clancy (born 1958), American football and basketball player
- Sam Clancy Jr. (born 1980), American basketball assistant coach and former player, son of the above
- Sean Clancy (disambiguation)
- Stephen Clancy (born 1992), Irish racing cyclist
- Susan Clancy, American clinical psychologist
- T. Frank Clancy (1871–1936), American politician and businessman
- Taliqua Clancy (born 1992), Australian beach volleyball player
- Terry Clancy (born 1943), Canadian ice hockey player, son of King Clancy
- Tom or Thomas Clancy (disambiguation)
- Tim Clancy (born 1984), Irish football manager and former player
- Tyler Clancy (born 1997), American politician
- William Clancy (1802–1847), Irish missionary
- Willie Clancy (musician) (1918–1973), Irish Uilleann pipes player
- Willie Clancy (hurler) (1906–1967), Irish hurler

== Fictional characters ==
- Kanuka Clancy, one of the main characters on the anime series Mobile Police Patlabor
- Chief Clancy Wiggum, on The Simpsons
- Clancy Freeman, a recurring character in Blue Heelers
- Clancy, the protagonist in the band Twenty One Pilots' 4th—8th concept albums (Blurryface, Trench, Scaled and Icy, Clancy and Breach)
- Clancy, a playable character in the video game Brawl Stars
- Clancy of the Overflow, the titular character of a Banjo Paterson poem, possibly based on Australian drover Thomas Gerald Clancy
- Nancy Clancy, the titular character of Fancy Nancy.
- Clancy Gilroy, the main protagonist of The Midnight Gospel.

== See also ==
- Senator Clancy (disambiguation)
- Clancey
- Clancee
