= 1948 in baseball =

The following are the baseball events of the year 1948 throughout the world.

== Champions ==
=== Major League Baseball ===
- Negro League World Series: Homestead Grays over Birmingham Black Barons (4–1)
- World Series: Cleveland Indians over Boston Braves (4–2)
- All-Star Game, July 13 at Sportsman's Park: American League, 5–2
- Negro League Baseball All-Star Game: West, 3–0

=== Other champions ===
- All-American Girls Professional Baseball League: Rockford Peaches
- College World Series: USC
- Little League World Series: Lock Haven, Pennsylvania

==== Winter Leagues ====
- Cuban League: Leones del Habana
- Mexican Pacific League: Ostioneros de Guaymas
- Puerto Rican League: Leones de Ponce
- Venezuelan League: Cervecería Caracas

==== Club tournaments ====
- Interamerican Series: Buffalo All-Stars

== Awards and honors ==
- Baseball Hall of Fame
  - Herb Pennock
  - Pie Traynor
- Most Valuable Player
  - Lou Boudreau (AL)
  - Stan Musial (NL)
- Rookie of the Year
  - Alvin Dark
- The Sporting News Player of the Year Award
  - Lou Boudreau, Cleveland Indians
- The Sporting News Pitcher of the Year Award
  - Bob Lemon, Cleveland Indians
  - Johnny Sain, Boston Braves
- The Sporting News Manager of the Year Award
  - Billy Meyer, Pittsburgh Pirates

== Statistical leaders ==
	American League		National League		Negro American League		Negro National League	
Stat	Player	Total	Player	Total	Player	Total	Player	Total
AVG	Ted Williams (BOS)	.369	Stan Musial (STL)	.376	Artie Wilson (BBB)	.433	Lester Lockett (BEG)	.362
HR	Joe DiMaggio (NYY)	39	Ralph Kiner (PIT); Johnny Mize (NYG)	40	Willard Brown (KCM)	7	Luke Easter (HOM); Lester Lockett (BEG)	6
RBI	Joe DiMaggio (NYY)	155	Stan Musial (STL)	131	Willard Brown (KCM)	54	Lester Lockett (BEG)	53
W	Hal Newhouser (DET)	21	Johnny Sain (BSN)	24	Jim LaMarque (KCM)	9	Bill Byrd (BEG)	10
ERA	Gene Bearden (CLE)	2.43	Harry Brecheen (STL)	2.24	Ford Smith (KCM)	2.43	Bill Ricks (PHS)	1.56
K	Bob Feller (CLE)	164	Harry Brecheen (STL)	149	Jim LaMarque (KCM)	80	Joe Black (BEG)	85

== Major league baseball final standings ==
=== American League final standings ===
American League
Team	W	L	Pct.	GB	Home	Road
Cleveland Indians	97	58	.626	—	48‍–‍30	49‍–‍28
Boston Red Sox	96	59	.619	1	55‍–‍23	41‍–‍36
New York Yankees	94	60	.610	2½	50‍–‍27	44‍–‍33
Philadelphia Athletics	84	70	.545	12½	36‍–‍41	48‍–‍29
Detroit Tigers	78	76	.506	18½	39‍–‍38	39‍–‍38
St. Louis Browns	59	94	.386	37	34‍–‍42	25‍–‍52
Washington Senators	56	97	.366	40	29‍–‍48	27‍–‍49
Chicago White Sox	51	101	.336	44½	27‍–‍48	24‍–‍53

Locations of teams for the 1942–1953 American League seasons
American League

=== National League final standings ===
National League
Team	W	L	Pct.	GB	Home	Road
Boston Braves	91	62	.595	—	45‍–‍31	46‍–‍31
St. Louis Cardinals	85	69	.552	6½	44‍–‍33	41‍–‍36
Brooklyn Dodgers	84	70	.545	7½	36‍–‍41	48‍–‍29
Pittsburgh Pirates	83	71	.539	8½	47‍–‍31	36‍–‍40
New York Giants	78	76	.506	13½	37‍–‍40	41‍–‍36
Philadelphia Phillies	66	88	.429	25½	32‍–‍44	34‍–‍44
Cincinnati Reds	64	89	.418	27	32‍–‍45	32‍–‍44
Chicago Cubs	64	90	.416	27½	35‍–‍42	29‍–‍48

Locations of teams for the 1943–1952 National League seasons
National League

== Negro league baseball final standings ==
All Negro leagues standings below are per MLB and Seamheads.

=== Negro American League final standings ===
vs. Negro American League						vs. Major Black teams			
Negro American League	W	L	T	Pct.	GB	W	L	T	Pct.
^{(1)} Birmingham Black Barons	56	22	0	.718	—	67	40	3	.623
^{(2)} Kansas City Monarchs	49	28	3	.631	6½	69	37	3	.647
Cleveland Buckeyes	42	43	2	.494	17½	50	58	4	.464
Memphis Red Sox	39	49	3	.476	22	49	69	4	.418
Indianapolis Clowns	27	45	4	.382	26	45	78	7	.373
Chicago American Giants	26	52	0	.333	30	38	60	2	.390

^{(1)} First half champion ^{(2)} Second half champion

Locations of teams for the 1948 Negro American League season
Negro American League

=== Negro National League final standings ===
This was the sixteenth and final season of the Negro National League. Homestead and Baltimore each won a half of the season. As such, they were matched against each other in the postseason. In the playoffs, Homestead won Games 1 and 2 before a curfew called Game 3 in the ninth inning. Game 4 went to Baltimore, but Homestead had protested that Game 3 should be played from where Game 3 had been stopped (8–4, bases loaded) rather than the start of the ninth inning (tied). The league agreed, but Baltimore refused to play and therefore forfeited.

vs. Negro National League						vs. Major Black teams			
Negro National League	W	L	T	Pct.	GB	W	L	T	Pct.
^{(2)} Homestead Grays	39	21	2	.645	1½	58	25	4	.690
^{(1)} Baltimore Elite Giants	46	25	2	.644	—	53	30	2	.635
Newark Eagles	29	27	1	.518	9½	39	34	3	.533
Philadelphia Stars	27	30	2	.475	12	34	35	3	.493
New York Cubans	17	27	1	.389	15½	30	31	1	.492
New York Black Yankees	9	37	0	.196	24½	13	48	0	.213

^{(1)} First half champion ^{(2)} Second half champion

Locations of teams for the 1948 Negro National League season
Negro National League
Notes: Homestead Grays played in both Washington, D.C. and Pittsburgh, with the majority in Washington, D.C.
New York Black Yankees played in both Rochester and New York, with the majority in Rochester.

=== Negro league postseason ===
1948 was the 23rd and final time that there was a "Playoff Series" held between black baseball teams. 1913 is retroactively the only one not in the major league era of Negro league baseball (1920–1948). 1948 is the only time that saw both the American and National League hold a postseason series to determine the pennant (Major League Baseball would not hold such a format for 21 years).

- Negro American League Championship Series: Birmingham Black Barons over Kansas City Monarchs 4–3 (one tie).
- Negro National League Championship Series: Homestead Grays over Baltimore Elite Giants 2–1 (one forfeit).
- 1948 Negro World Series: Homestead Grays over Birmingham Black Barons 4–1.

== All-American Girls Professional Baseball League final standings ==
=== Eastern Division ===
Rank	Team	W	L	Pct.	GB
1	Grand Rapids Chicks	77	48	.616	—
2	Muskegon Lassies	67	58	.536	10
3	South Bend Blue Sox	57	69	.452	20 1/2
4	Fort Wayne Daisies	53	73	.421	24 1/2
5	Chicago Colleens	47	77	.379	29 1/2

=== Western Division ===
Rank	Team	W	L	Pct.	GB
1	Racine Belles	77	49	.616	—
2	Rockford Peaches	75	50	.600	1 1/2
3	Peoria Redwings	71	55	.563	6
4	Kenosha Comets	62	64	.421	15
5	Springfield Sallies	41	84	.328	35 1/2

== Events ==
=== January ===
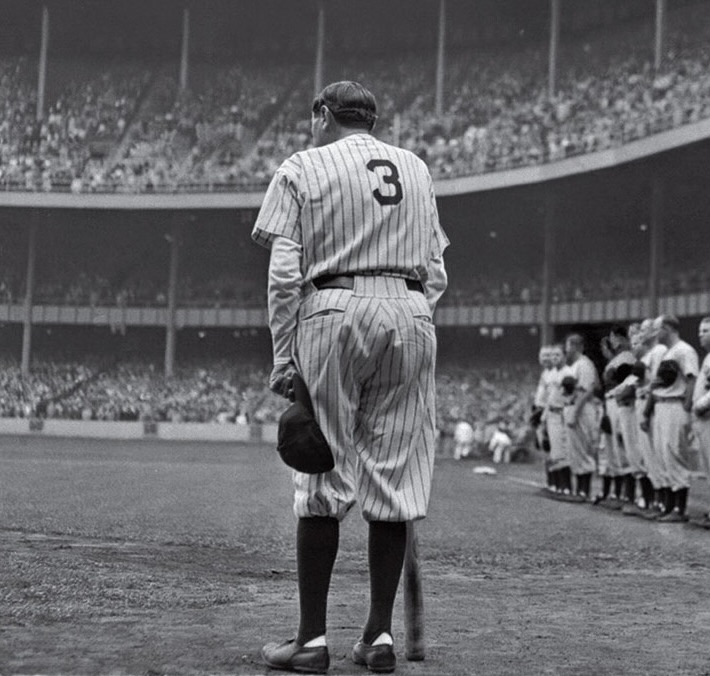
Babe Ruth, June 13, 1948

- January 27 – The Cleveland Indians obtain center fielder Thurman Tucker from the Chicago White Sox for catcher Ralph Weigel. Tucker will start 54 games in center for Cleveland in 1948, second only to future Hall-of-Famer Larry Doby.
- January 30 – Herb Pennock, general manager of the Philadelphia Phillies since November 1943, dies suddenly at age 53 from a cerebral hemorrhage after he collapses in a hotel lobby in New York City. Pennock is also a former star southpaw pitcher who won 241 games for three American League teams, most notably the New York Yankees, between 1912 and 1934. Club president R. R. M. Carpenter Jr. takes on the Phillies' GM portfolio.

=== February ===
- February 7 – The Philadelphia Phillies trade outfielder Johnny Wyrostek and cash to the Cincinnati Reds for 1947 National League All-Star shortstop Eddie Miller.
- February 12 – The Philadelphia Athletics sign veteran free-agent slugger Rudy York, released ten days earlier by the Chicago White Sox.
- February 24 – In George Weiss' first major trade since his appointment as general manager of the New York Yankees on October 7, 1947, he deals catcher Aaron Robinson and pitchers Bill Wight and Fred Bradley to the Chicago White Sox for left-handed starting pitcher Ed Lopat. The 29-year-old Lopat has posted a 50–49 won–lost record, with a 3.18 earned run average, in 113 games for Chicago since 1944; in 7½ seasons with the Yankees, he will go 113–59 (3.19) and win five World Series rings.
- February 27 – Pitcher Herb Pennock, who died January 30, and third baseman Pie Traynor are elected to the National Baseball Hall of Fame.

=== March ===
- March 1 – The Chicago Cubs deal infielder Bobby Sturgeon to the Boston Braves for pitcher Walt Lanfranconi and infielder Dick Culler.
- March 6 – The Braves obtain starting second baseman Eddie Stanky from the Brooklyn Dodgers for infielder/outfielder Bama Rowell, first baseman Ray Sanders, and $40,000. When it's determined that Sanders was injured when the deal was made, he's returned to Boston on April 18, and the Braves compensate Brooklyn with $60,000 in additional cash. Until an ankle fracture sidelines him July 8, the combative Stanky will spark the 1948 Braves into contention for the National League pennant.
- March 17 – Bama Rowell's stay in Brooklyn lasts only 11 days when the Dodgers sell his contract to the Philadelphia Phillies.
- March 26 – After one season with the St. Louis Browns, catcher Jake Early returns to the Washington Senators via a cash transaction. The lefty-swinging receiver made the 1943 American League All-Star team as a Senator.
- March 27 – Recently retired slugger and future Hall of Famer Hank Greenberg joins the Cleveland Indians as minority owner, vice president and farm system director. Greenberg, 37, spent 12 of his 13 major league seasons as a member of the Detroit Tigers, "tormenting" the Cleveland pitching staff.
- March 29 – The Philadelphia Phillies claim pitcher Ed Heusser, 38, off waivers from the Brooklyn Dodgers. Heusser went 19–3 (2.73) in 1947 for the Triple-A Montreal Royals.
- March 30 – The Pacific Coast League (PCL) integrates, as catcher/third baseman Johnny Ritchey of the San Diego Padres pinch hits against the Los Angeles Angels. Ritchey is a former member of the Chicago American Giants who had batted .324 in 1947. He never plays in the American or National leagues, but spends seven years in the PCL.
- March 31 – The Brooklyn Dodgers come to "Dodgertown" to play an exhibition game at their brand-new spring training facility in Vero Beach, Florida, which opened to their 600 minor-league players earlier this year while the parent team worked out in Santo Domingo, Dominican Republic. Today, both Jackie Robinson and Roy Campanella appear in the Brooklyn lineup against the Triple-A Montreal Royals. The Dodgers had leased Vero Beach's former naval air station to enable all of its personnel—including black players restricted by Florida's Jim Crow laws—to live and train together in one place, taking advantage of barracks and dining facilities built during World War II. The Brooklyn club itself will begin training at Dodgertown in 1949, and it will open a new stadium there to host exhibition games in 1953.

=== April ===
- April 3 – The Cleveland Indians purchase the contract of right-handed relief pitcher Russ Christopher from the Philadelphia Athletics. Christopher, 30, will save 17 games for the pennant-bound Indians, most in the American League. A childhood victim of rheumatic fever that permanently weakened his heart, Christopher will retire from baseball after the 1948 World Series with a championship ring.
- April 7 – The Philadelphia Phillies acquire Dick Sisler from the St. Louis Cardinals for infielder Ralph LaPointe and $30,000. A part-time player in St. Louis, Sisler, 27, will win a regular job in Philadelphia as a left-fielder and first baseman, and his home run in extra-innings against the Brooklyn Dodgers at Ebbets Field on October 1, 1950, will deliver only the second pennant in Phillies history.
- April 18:
  - At Yankee Stadium, 62,369 fans—the largest ever for an exhibition game—watch the Brooklyn Dodgers edge the New York Yankees, 5–3.
  - Before 26,663 fans at Fenway Park, the Boston Braves salvage a victory in the three-game exhibition series with the Boston Red Sox, winning 3–2 behind a solid pitching performance from Warren Spahn.
  - The St. Louis Cardinals re-sign outfielder Joe Medwick. The future Hall of Famer, 37, had spent 1947 with the Redbirds, his second tour of duty with the club, batting .307 in 75 games as a backup outfielder and pinch-hitter, but was released October 14. Medwick will appear as a pinch hitter in 20 games this season for the Cardinals until July 25, when he opts to retire.
- April 19 – In a duel of Baseball Hall of Fame managers, Connie Mack's Philadelphia Athletics spoil Joe McCarthy's debut as pilot of the Boston Red Sox by sweeping an Opening Day doubleheader, 5–4 and 4–2, at Fenway Park. McCarthy is returning to baseball after retiring from the New York Yankees on May 23, 1946.
- April 20 – George Vico of the Detroit Tigers hits a home run off the very first pitch he sees in the majors. In doing so, he became the fifth player in major league history to accomplish the feat.
- April 21 – Leo Durocher of the Brooklyn Dodgers, who returned from his one-year suspension one day earlier, uses 24 players, a new MLB record, in a 9–5 loss to the New York Giants.
- April 25 – Ted Kluszewski of the Cincinnati Reds hits the first home run of his distinguished career, a three-run shot off the Pittsburgh Pirates' Hal Gregg.
- April 27 – At Ebbets Field, future Hall of Famer Roy Campanella takes the field as the Brooklyn Dodgers' starting catcher for the first time after two previous appearances as a late-inning substitute. He goes hitless with a base on balls in four plate appearances and handles pitchers Rex Barney and Erv Palica in a 3–2 loss to the Boston Braves. Campanella, 26, is the former standout catcher for the Baltimore Elite Giants of the Negro National League. After today, he'll be sent to the Triple-A St. Paul Saints to break the color line in the American Association before he's recalled to Brooklyn for good in July.
- April 29 – Ted Wilks suffers his first loss in 77 consecutive appearances. Wilks, a relief pitcher for the St. Louis Cardinals, hadn't lost a game since September 8, 1945. His record during that time was 12–0, with four of those wins coming as a spot starter.

=== May ===
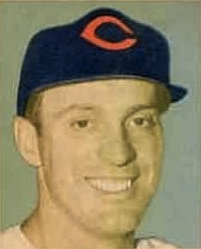
Danny Litwhiler

- May 3 – The Brooklyn Dodgers release third baseman Cookie Lavagetto, ending his MLB playing career. Lavagetto, 35, hasn't appeared in an official game for the 1948 Dodgers, but he leaves behind an indelible memory in his final MLB hit: his pinch double against Bill Bevens that spoiled Bevens' no-hitter and delivered a 3–2 Brooklyn victory in the ninth inning of Game 4 of the 1947 World Series.
- May 11 – The Boston Braves and Cincinnati Reds exchange outfielders, with righthanded-handed hitting Danny Litwhiler going to Cincinnati for lefty-swinging Marv Rickert, assigned to Triple-A Milwaukee. Rickert will be called to Boston in late September to replace Braves' left-fielder Jeff Heath, when Heath's broken ankle keeps him out of the 1948 World Series.
- May 16 – Pete Gray, one-armed outfielder with the 1945 St. Louis Browns, starts his comeback with Class A Elmira.
- May 20 – Joe DiMaggio hits for the cycle for the second time in his career (he'd done it previously on July 9, 1937) and bashes two homers in the New York Yankees' 13–2 rout of the Chicago White Sox at Comiskey Park. The Yankee Clipper drives in six runs.
- May 23 – When the 12–19 Cincinnati Reds, who've been the National League's cellar-dwellers since May 9, defeat the defending NL champion Brooklyn Dodgers 6–5 at Ebbets Field, they drop the 11–18 Dodgers into last place in the Senior Circuit. It's Brooklyn's eighth straight loss. The Dodgers will once again fall into the NL basement May 26 at 12–19 before a four-game win streak boosts them into seventh place, but their early-season struggles bode ominously for the future of manager Leo Durocher.
- May 27 – With their fifth straight victory, 7–3 over the Washington Senators at Griffith Stadium, the 22–10 Philadelphia Athletics take over first place in the American League, jumping over the 19–9 Cleveland Indians. In 1946, Connie Mack's outfit had gone 49–105 and finished last for the sixth time in seven years.

=== June ===
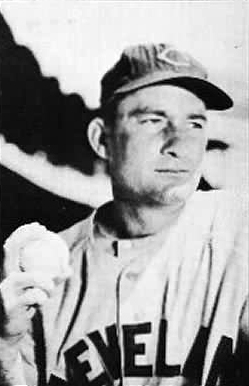
Bob Lemon

- June 2 – The Cleveland Indians trade pitcher Al Gettel and outfielder Pat Seerey to the Chicago White Sox for outfielder Bob Kennedy.
- June 4 – At Griffith Stadium, the visiting Indians break a scoreless deadlock with a five-run 15th inning to defeat the Washington Senators, 5–0. Cleveland hits two triples (struck by Joe Gordon and Wally Judnich) during their winning rally. Though technically trailing the 27–14 Philadelphia Athletics by half a game in the standings, 24–12 Cleveland holds first place in the American League by .008.
- June 7 – The Chicago Cubs claim infielder Gene Mauch off waivers from the Brooklyn Dodgers.
- June 13 – Appearing at Yankee Stadium just nine weeks before his death, the legendary Babe Ruth is honored by the New York Yankees in an emotional pre-game ceremony and his jersey number 3 is retired. This will be his final appearance at "The House That Ruth Built", which is celebrating its 25th anniversary.
- June 14 – Allowing three inherited runners to score, then two more runs of his own making, in only one-third of an inning—and costing the Philadelphia Athletics a ballgame to the lowly St. Louis Browns—Philadelphia relief pitcher Nels Potter is "fired" by his livid, 85-year-old manager, Connie Mack, in front of his teammates in the clubhouse. With his unconditional release, free-agent Potter takes his services to the Boston Braves, whom he helps win the 1948 National League pennant.
- June 15 – The first-place Cleveland Indians swap left-handers with the poverty-stricken, seventh-place Browns, acquiring Sam Zoldak from St. Louis for Bill Kennedy and $100,000. Zoldak will win nine games for Cleveland through season's end, including four during the heat of September's pennant race.
- June 29 – The Boston Braves sign teenaged "bonus baby" Johnny Antonelli, a left-handed pitcher out of a Rochester, New York, high school. His $50,000 bonus means that Antonelli must be kept on the Braves' MLB roster—and it rankles established Boston pitchers like Johnny Sain whose salaries are puny by comparison.
- June 30 – Former third baseman/outfielder Bob Lemon, a full-time pitcher for only two full years, fires a no-hitter as the Cleveland Indians defeat the Detroit Tigers, 2–0. The future Hall of Famer walks three and strikes out four.

=== July ===
- July 4 – Scoring 14 runs in the eighth inning, the Boston Red Sox break a five-all tie to overwhelm the Philadelphia Athletics 19–5 at Fenway Park. The win lifts the talented but slow-starting Red Sox to 33–32; they had been 15–24 as recently as June 2.
- July 7 – The Cleveland Indians sign right-hander Leroy "Satchel" Paige, 41, legendary Negro league pitcher since his 1927 debut with the Birmingham Black Barons, and "a man who became bigger than the game ... [who] quickly became the biggest drawing-card in Negro baseball, able to overpower batters with a buggy-whipped fastball." He will pitch in formerly segregated "Organized Baseball" into 1966, and even hurl three scoreless innings in an official American League game at age 58 on September 25, 1965. Paige will be inducted into the Baseball Hall of Fame in 1971.
- July 8 – Boston Braves second baseman Eddie Stanky breaks his right ankle sliding into third base in the third inning of a 7–4 victory over the Brooklyn Dodgers at Ebbets Field. Batting .325 as a key contributor to the Braves' first-place showing so far, Stanky will not be able to return to the regular lineup until September 28.
- July 13:
  - At Sportsman's Park, home of the St. Louis Browns, the American League defeats the National League, 5–2, in the All-Star Game. The Junior Circuit overcomes a first-inning, 2–0 deficit to seize the victory, with winning pitcher Vic Raschi also delivering a two-run single that ices the AL's triumph.
  - Standings at the All-Star break reveal surprises in each league. The 46–31 Boston Braves, pennant-less since 1914, lead the National League by 5½ games over the 39–35 Pittsburgh Pirates, who finished seventh in 1947. The defending champion Brooklyn Dodgers are languishing 8½ games behind Boston. In the American League, the 45–28 Cleveland Indians lead the formerly downtrodden Philadelphia Athletics (48–32) by a half-game, with the New York Yankees 1½ games back at 44–32. Cleveland has not captured a league title since 1920.

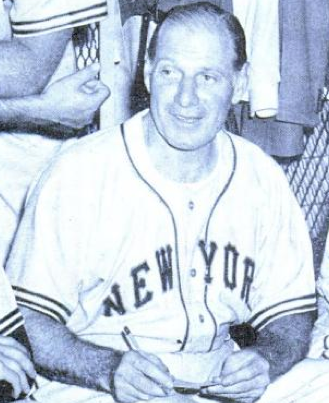
Leo Durocher as a New York Giant

- July 16:
  - New York City's National League arch-enemies share front-page headlines with the Cold War, conflict in the Middle East, and the upcoming U.S. Presidential election, when the Giants and Dodgers engage in a stunning game of managerial musical chairs.
    - Mel Ott, a future Hall-of-Fame slugger who has worn a Giant uniform since his debut at age 17 in 1926, steps down from the managing post he has held since Opening Day 1942. Ott, now 39, has skippered the Giants through a rare period of mediocrity in their so-far illustrious history. When he quits, his 1948 team is 37–38 (.493), tied for fifth place, and 8½ games behind the NL-leading Boston Braves. Ott departs with a 464–530–10 (.467) mark over 6½ seasons—and two last-place finishes. He moves into a front-office job, and never again manages in the majors.
    - In an even greater shock, Brooklyn's pilot, Leo Durocher, is let out of his two-year contract to take Ott's place at the Polo Grounds, where he has been reviled as an implacable foe. Despite his recent, year-long suspension for "conduct detrimental to baseball" that sidelined him during 1947, Durocher, 42, has been the face of the Dodgers' rise to hard-playing pennant contender since he became player-manager in 1939. He has led the Dodgers to a 738–565–15 (.566) overall record and the 1941 NL championship, but his 1948 club, expected to defend its 1947 pennant, was a disappointing 35–37 (.486) under his command. In his last game in a Brooklyn uniform, he directed the 1948 NL All-Stars to a 5–2 defeat on July 13. Under Durocher, this year's Giants will show only slight improvement, with a 41–38 mark, but by 1951—after a roster makeover inspired by Durocher's brand of aggressive baseball—they will battle the Dodgers in one of the greatest late-season pennant races in baseball annals.
    - The Dodgers replace Durocher by calling Burt Shotton, 63, a longtime associate of Brooklyn president and general manager Branch Rickey, back into harness as their skipper. As acting manager of the 1947 Dodgers during Durocher's suspension, Shotton presided over a team that won 92 of the 152 games on his watch, captured the NL pennant by five games, and pushed the New York Yankees to seven games in the 1947 World Series. The colorful Durocher's polar opposite—for example, because Shotton refuses to wear a uniform, he must remain in the Brooklyn dugout during games and can't take the field to dispute umpires' decisions—he will revive the 1948 Dodgers, who finish third. Then they win another pennant under him in 1949, and just miss a third title in 1950, before he's fired in the wake of Rickey's ouster from the team's front office.
  - The Philadelphia Phillies, 37–42 (.468) and seventh in the National League, also change managers, firing Ben Chapman and putting coach Dusty Cooke in charge on an interim basis. Chapman, former Yankees' outfielder of the 1930s, has compiled a 196–276–2 record since becoming the club's skipper June 30, 1945. His Philadelphia tenure will become notorious from an April 1947 series at Ebbets Field when Chapman led the Phillies in race baiting to ruthlessly bench-jockey Jackie Robinson.
- July 18 – Chicago White Sox left fielder Pat Seerey hits four home runs in a game against the Philadelphia Athletics, to become the fifth Major League player to do so. The White Sox win, 12–11, in 11 innings.
- July 22 – Two weeks after losing Eddie Stanky to a broken ankle for at least 60 days, the NL-leading Boston Braves absorb another blow when regular centerfielder Jim Russell is hospitalized in Cincinnati, suffering from unexplained weight loss and a high fever. Eventually diagnosed with subacute bacterial endocarditis, Russell appears in only seven more games in 1948, and none after August 10. He recovers over the winter, however, and is able to appear in 130 games in 1949.
- July 24 – Four members of the Duluth Dukes of the Class C Northern League are killed and 14 are injured when the team bus collides with a truck on a highway near St. Paul, Minnesota. The driver of the truck is also killed. Injured players include Mel McGaha, a future major league manager, and Elmer Schoendienst, younger brother of the St. Louis Cardinals' second baseman. The tragedy recalls the 1946 bus crash involving the Spokane Indians, which took the lives of nine players.
- July 25 – Joe Dobson tosses a six-hitter and Dom DiMaggio and Bobby Doerr provide the runs batted in, as the scorching Boston Red Sox shut down the Cleveland Indians 3–0 to grab a share of first place in the American League. The Bosox have won 39 of their last 51 games dating to June 3, and will remain in the pennant hunt for the rest of the AL campaign.
- July 27 – Eddie Sawyer replaces interim boss Dusty Cooke as manager of the Philadelphia Phillies. Sawyer, 37, has worked with many of the younger Philadelphia players as skipper of their high level farm clubs at Utica and Toronto.
- July 30 – Sophomore outfielder Wally Westlake of the Pittsburgh Pirates hits for the cycle in his club's 10–5 victory over the Brooklyn Dodgers at Ebbets Field.

=== August ===
- August 2 – The St. Louis Cardinals amass 20 hits and thrash the New York Giants, 21–5, at the Polo Grounds. Backup catcher Del Wilber drives in five runs.
- August 3 – The Chicago Cubs acquire veteran second baseman Emil Verban from the Phillies on waivers. Verban, 32, will bat .280 in 199 games with the Cubs through September 12, 1950, and gain a measure of immortality in 1975 when a group of Chicago fans in Washington, D.C., christen themselves "the Emil Verban Society".
- August 5 – The seventh-place Cincinnati Reds (44–56 and 13½ games out of first) dismiss second-year manager Johnny Neun and replace him with former ace starting pitcher Bucky Walters. With 1939's National League Most Valuable Player at the helm, the Reds win only 20 of the 53 remaining games on their schedule.

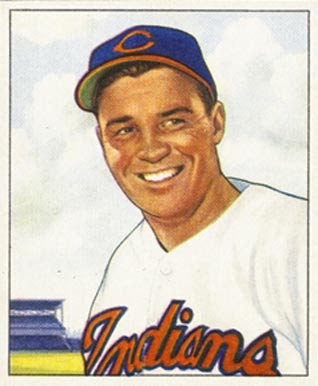
Gene Bearden

- August 12 – In the second game of a doubleheader, the Cleveland Indians rap out 29 hits in a 26–3 win over the St. Louis Browns. The Indians set a major league record as 14 different players hit safely. Rookie knuckle-baller Gene Bearden improves his pitching record to 11–3 (2.56 ERA); he also goes four-for-six at the plate, including a homer, scores four runs and knocks in four. The Tribe's split of the twin bill puts them a half-game behind the front-running Philadelphia Athletics.
- August 16 – Babe Ruth, arguably the greatest player in baseball history, dies from cancer in New York City at the age of 53. On August 17, his open casket is placed on display in the rotunda of Yankee Stadium, where it remains for two days; 77,000 people file past to pay him tribute.
- August 18 – Rex Barney of the Brooklyn Dodgers one-hits the Philadelphia Phillies, 1–0, at Shibe Park. Putsy Caballero's fifth-inning single is the home side's only hit, while Barney issues three walks. Brooklyn's only run off Robin Roberts comes in the top of the first; it's unearned.
- August 20 – The Cleveland Indians notch their fourth straight shutout victory, as Leroy "Satchel" Paige blanks the visiting Chicago White Sox on three hits at Cleveland Stadium. It's Paige's second complete-game shutout of the streak—the 42-year-old future Hall of Famer's first two shutouts as an American Leaguer. The Cleveland staff's consecutive innings scoreless skein will reach 471/3 until the White Sox tally three ninth-inning runs on homers from Aaron Robinson and Dave Philley in tomorrow afternoon's contest.
- August 21 – The second Little League World Series tournament is held in Williamsport, Pennsylvania. The Lock Haven All Stars of Lock Haven, Pennsylvania defeated the St. Petersburg All Stars of St. Petersburg, Florida in the championship game, by a score of 5–4.
- August 25 – At Forbes Field, the visiting Brooklyn Dodgers lead the Pittsburgh Pirates 11–9 in the bottom of the ninth, two out, and two men on. Reliever Carl Erskine enters the game to face Bucs' pinch hitter Eddie Bockman. With the count three balls, one strike, the Dodgers replace Erskine with Hank Behrman, and Bockman grounds out to seemingly end the game in a Brooklyn triumph. But Pirates' manager Billy Meyer protests that the Dodgers have violated Rule 17, Section 4, which mandates that a non-injured hurler (Erskine) must face at least one hitter for a full at bat before he can be removed from the game. His protest is upheld by NL president Ford Frick. When the game is resumed September 21 at Ebbets Field, Bockman takes ball four from Behrman, loading the bases, before Pirate shortstop Stan Rojek clears them with a triple, and Pittsburgh claims a 12–11 victory. Erskine is charged with walking Bockman, and the loss.
- August 26 – The Boston Red Sox take the "rubber match" of a three-game series at Fenway Park, defeating the Cleveland Indians, 8–4, behind Mel Parnell's tenth victory and future Hall-of-Famer Bobby Doerr's eighth-inning, tie-breaking three-run homer. In winning, the Red Sox take a half-game lead over the Indians and a one-game advantage over the New York Yankees in the American League race; all three clubs are tied in loss column with 47 setbacks.
- August 29–30 — Disrupting the National League's pennant race, the visiting Dodgers sweep consecutive-day doubleheaders from the St. Louis Cardinals at Sportsman's Park. Brooklyn's four victories, coupled with the Boston Braves' three straight defeats at the hands of the Pirates in Pittsburgh, enable the Dodgers (68–51) to leapfrog both Boston (69–55) and St. Louis (67–57) to take the lead in the Senior Circuit. Under Burt Shotton, who returned to the manager's post July 16, Brooklyn has gone 32–14.
  - In the opening game of August 29's twin bill, Jackie Robinson hits for the cycle to power the Dodgers' 12–7 victory. It will be the only "cycle" in the Hall of Famer's ten-year NL career.

=== September ===
- September 1 – After a poor (14–17) August that costs them the National League lead, then dropping the opening game of today's Crosley Field doubleheader against the Cincinnati Reds, the Boston Braves capture the nightcap, 11–1, behind pitchers Glenn Elliott and Clyde Shoun. The victory kicks off a 16–2 run that boosts the Braves back into first place on September 3; by the time the hot streak ends on September 22, Boston holds a commanding 7½-game lead in the NL.

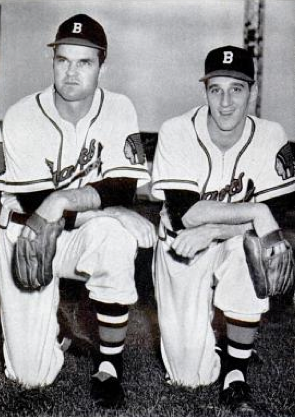
Boston Braves aces Sain and Spahn

- September 6 – Labor Day doubleheaders increase the odds for an "all-Boston" World Series. In the American League, the Red Sox sweep the Washington Senators at Griffith Stadium, while the contending New York Yankees and Cleveland Indians split their twin bills. In the National, the Braves sweep their nearest rivals, the Brooklyn Dodgers, at Braves Field: Warren Spahn throws a 14-inning complete game in the opener for a 2–1 triumph; and in Game 2, Johnny Sain holds the Dodgers off the scoreboard and gets credit for a six-inning, 4–0 triumph when the contest is halted by darkness. In the AL, the 82–48 Red Sox lead the 81–50 Yankees by 1½ and 78–53 Cleveland by 4½. In the Senior Circuit, the 76–57 Braves lead 70–59 Brooklyn by four lengths, with the 68–58 Pittsburgh Pirates and 70–60 St. Louis Cardinals each 4½ games back.
- September 9 – Rex Barney of the Brooklyn Dodgers pitches a 2–0 no-hitter over the New York Giants at the Polo Grounds.
- September 13 – Cleveland Indians pitcher Don Black, 32, is rushed to St. Vincent Charity Hospital after he suffers a cerebral hemorrhage while batting during the second inning of a home game against the St. Louis Browns. Collapsing to his knees, he loses consciousness after teammates assist him to the dugout. On September 22, Cleveland owner Bill Veeck organizes "Don Black Night" at Municipal Stadium. Black's teammates pay for their own tickets to the contest, over 76,000 attend and $40,000 is raised for the pitcher's medical care. After being hospitalized for a month, Black recovers from the ordeal and attends spring training in 1949, but he will never pitch again in the majors.
- September 16 – New York Yankees general manager George Weiss denies persistent reports that he is at odds with field manager Bucky Harris over the issue of minor-league player call-ups. Harris, who led the 1947 Bombers to their 11th world championship and 15th AL pennant, also issues a denial, and says he's focusing on guiding the 1948 Yankees, who today are only one game out of first place, to another World Series. He adds: "If, after the season is over, regardless of the outcome, Mr. Topping, Mr. Webb and Mr. Weiss decide not to re-engage me as manager, that is OK with me." After his Yankees win 94 games but finish 2½ games out of the lead when the 1948 campaign ends October 3, Harris' contract is not renewed.
- September 22:
  - En route to the finest season of his Hall-of-Fame career, Stan Musial of the St. Louis Cardinals posts his fourth five-hit game of 1948 in an 8–2 victory over league-leading Boston at Braves Field. In those four games (April 22, May 19, June 22, and today), Musial has lashed 20 hits in 21 at bats (for a batting average of .952) with four doubles, a triple, and two homers, scored 11 runs, and driven in ten. In today's game, Musial swings at only five pitches—and racks up a homer, a double, and three singles; he also ties Ty Cobb's record for most five-hit games in a single season, set in 1922.
  - On "Don Black Night," the homestanding Cleveland Indians score three first-inning runs and never look back, as they pay tribute to their stricken teammate by defeating the Boston Red Sox and climbing into a tie with the Bosox for the American League lead. Ken Keltner's two-run homer is the big blow, Bob Feller goes the distance for his 17th victory, and Cleveland wins its seventh in a row.
- September 24 – In the Bronx, Billy Johnson clouts a three-run pinch homer to help his New York Yankees defeat the Boston Red Sox, 9–6. With Cleveland falling to the Detroit Tigers, 4–3, there's now a three-way tie among the Yankees, Red Sox and Indians for the AL pennant. Each team sports a 91–56 record with seven to play.
- September 26 – At Braves Field, Bob Elliott hits a three-run homer powering the Boston Braves to a 3–2 triumph over the New York Giants, and clinching the Braves' first National League pennant since 1914.
- September 27 – The Washington Senators acquire Clyde Vollmer from the Cincinnati Reds for fellow outfielder Carden Gillenwater.
- September 29 – Only one day after getting Eddie Stanky back into their lineup after he fractured his right ankle July 8, the National League champion Boston Braves suffer another major injury. Left fielder Jeff Heath is lost for the World Series when he sustains a compound fracture of his left ankle; like Stanky's, Heath's injury comes at Brooklyn's Ebbets Field during a slide. Heath had batted .319 with 20 home runs in 115 games for Boston; in the Series, his place will be taken by lefty-swinging Marv Rickert and the right-handed Mike McCormick.
- September 30 – The New York Yankees purchase the contract of Gene Woodling from San Francisco of the Pacific Coast League. Woodling, 26, will win five World Series rings (1949–1953) as a member of the Yankees' outfield "platoon."

=== October ===
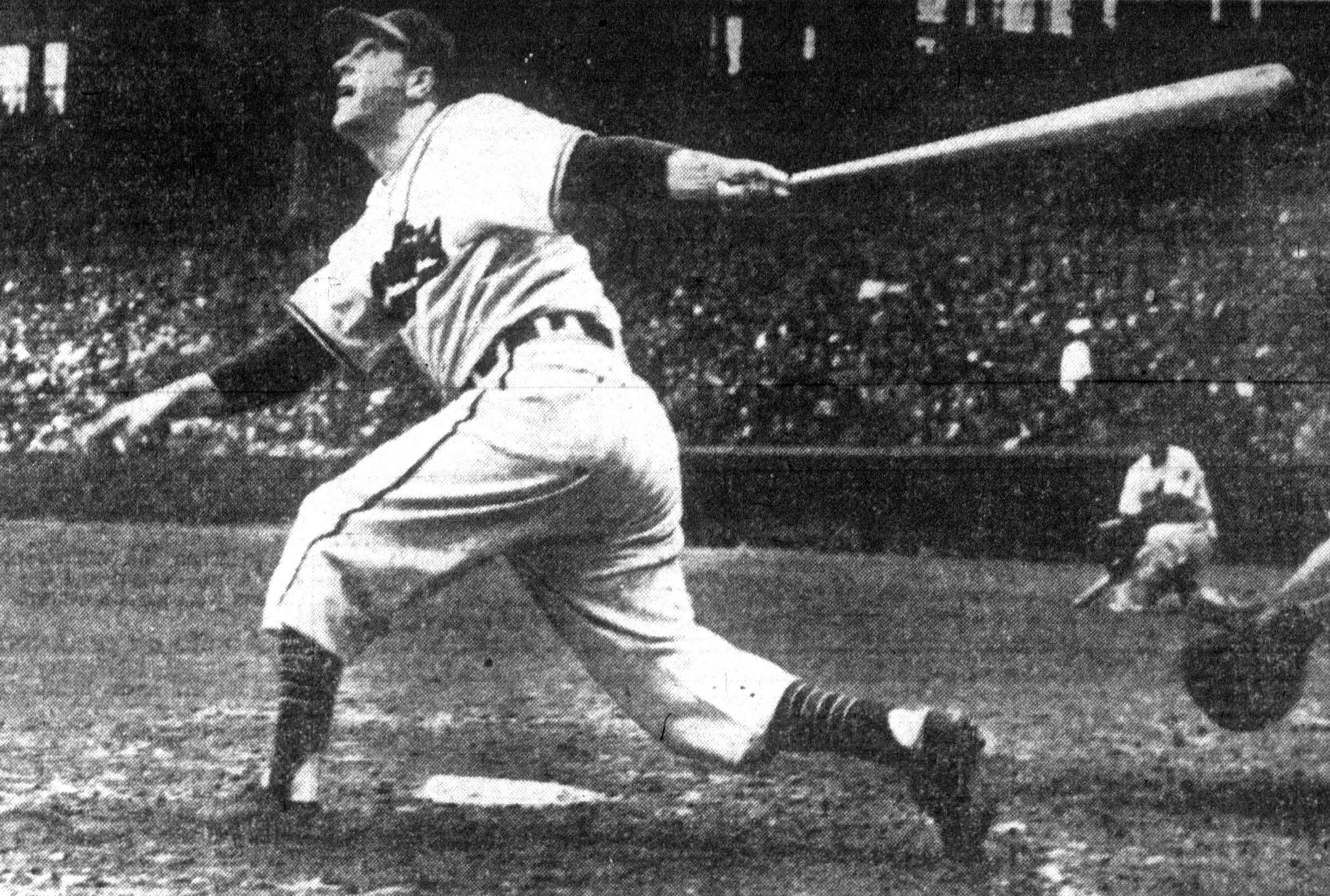
American League MVP Lou Boudreau

- October 1–3 – The final weekend of the American League's intense pennant race sees the second-place Boston Red Sox catch the front-running Cleveland Indians on the season's final day to force the first tie-breaker game in the AL's 48-year history.
  - On Friday, October 1, Cleveland (95–56 to begin the day) falls to the visiting Detroit Tigers, 5–3, while the Red Sox and New York Yankees (both 94–58) are idle. The Indians' 57th loss of the year cuts their lead to one full game.
  - On October 2, the Red Sox eliminate the Yankees from contention with a 5–1 victory at Fenway Park; Jack Kramer earns the win, and Ted Williams' 25th home run is the winning blow. Meanwhile, Cleveland maintains its one-game lead when Gene Bearden throws his second-straight shutout in an 8–0 blanking of the Tigers.
  - On Sunday, October 3, the Red Sox trounce the Yankees, 10–5, to end the regular season 96–58. Meanwhile, Detroit's Hal Newhouser, a future Hall of Famer, holds the Indians to five hits and a single run, and their 7–1 setback drops the Tribe, now 96–58, into a dead heat with the Red Sox for the AL pennant. Boston wins a coin toss and will host a single-game playoff the next day.
- October 3 – The AL's cellar-dwellers, the Chicago White Sox, dismiss former pitching great Ted Lyons as their manager and appoint longtime baseball man Jack Onslow, 59, their new pilot for 1949. Lyons, who won 260 games over 21 years in a White Sox uniform, had compiled a 185–245–4 (.430) record since taking the club's helm May 26, 1946.
- October 4:
  - Shortstop-manager Lou Boudreau goes four-for-four with two solo home runs and three runs scored, Ken Keltner adds a two-run shot, and Gene Bearden wins his 20th game, pitching a complete game with one day of rest, as the Cleveland Indians defeat the Boston Red Sox, 8–3, in a one-game showdown at Fenway Park. The Indians win the second AL pennant in their history and first since 1920. The Red Sox' defeat disappoints local fans who have been rooting for an "All-Boston" World Series matchup with the National League Braves. It's the second time such an event has been thwarted: in 1891, the NL champion Boston Beaneaters refused to meet the American Association champion Boston Reds in a proposed "world series" due to inter-league squabbling over player contracts.
  - The Chicago Cubs trade two-time NL home-run and RBI champion (1943, 1944) Bill "Swish" Nicholson to the Philadelphia Phillies for fellow outfielder and former National League batting king (1947) Harry "The Hat" Walker.
- October 5 – The Homestead Grays break a 6–6 tie with four ninth-inning runs to defeat the Birmingham Black Barons, 10–6, at Rickwood Field, to win the fifth and deciding game of the 1948 Negro World Series. It's the Grays' third title since 1943, and will be the last game in the annals of both the NWS and the Negro National League, which folds its tent later this autumn.
- October 6 – The 1948 World Series opens at Braves Field with the Cleveland Indians' Bob Feller throwing a two-hitter—but he loses the contest, 1–0, when Boston's Phil Masi is ruled safe at second base on a disputed pick-off play in the eighth inning. Masi then scores the game's only run on a single by Tommy Holmes. A still photo of the pick-off later reveals Masi is "out by a foot". Johnny Sain hurls a complete game four-hitter.
- October 8 – The St. Louis Cardinals release centerfielder Terry Moore, a fixture in their lineup since 1935 (excluding his three years of World War II service). Moore, 35, will remain with the Cardinals as a member of Eddie Dyer's coaching staff.
- October 9:
  - In World Series Game 4 at Cleveland Stadium, Larry Doby's solo homer in the third inning is the margin of victory as the Indians defeat the Boston Braves, 2–1, behind Steve Gromek and push the Braves to the brink of elimination. Doby becomes the first black player to hit a home run in a World Series.
  - The Chicago White Sox name Frank Lane general manager, succeeding Leslie O'Connor. Lane, 53, a former farm system director of the Cincinnati Reds, has largely been a minor-league executive over his career and spent 1948 as president of the Triple-A American Association. He will soon earn the nicknames "Frantic Frank" and "Trader Lane" for his penchant for constant roster-churning, but his transactions will revitalize the White Sox.
- October 11:
  - The Cleveland Indians defeat the Boston Braves, 4–3, in Game 6 to capture the second World Series in team history, four games to two. Bob Lemon earns his second win of the series, with rookie sensation Gene Bearden, who threw a complete-game shutout victory in Game 3, gaining a save in relief. Through 2024, the Indians have yet to win another Fall Classic.
  - The Chicago Cubs sell the contract of pitcher Russ Meyer to the Philadelphia Phillies.
- October 12 – Confirming rumors that have swirled for a week, the New York Yankees hire Casey Stengel, 58, to replace Bucky Harris as their manager, beginning with the 1949 season. Stengel's Oakland Oaks won the 1948 Pacific Coast League title, but his major-league managerial record to date has been subpar: 581–742–10 (.439) over nine seasons with the Brooklyn Dodgers (1934–1936) and Boston Bees/Braves (1938–1943), and one over-.500 campaign.

=== November ===
- November 4 – Former MLB outfielder Jake Powell, arrested by Washington, D.C., police for passing bad checks, draws a weapon on officers at the police station, only to turn the gun on himself and commit suicide. Powell, 40, earned four world-championship rings as a member of the New York Yankees (1936–1939), and batted .455 (10-for-22) in their six-game 1936 Fall Classic triumph over the New York Giants.
- November 6 – The Detroit Tigers fire manager Steve O'Neill, at the helm since 1943, and replace him with former New York Yankees stalwart Red Rolfe, who had been Detroit's farm system director. O'Neill's 1945 Tigers won a pennant and World Series; Rolfe has five Fall Classic rings (1936–1939, 1941) from a decade spent with the Yankees as their four-time All-Star third baseman.
- November 10 – In a move that will give them their pitching ace for the next decade, the Chicago White Sox acquire left hander Billy Pierce from the Detroit Tigers in exchange for former All-Star catcher Aaron Robinson. Detroit sweetens the deal by adding $10,000 in cash. Pierce, 21, will win 186 games for the White Sox over the next 13 years and make seven All-Star teams, while Robinson will last fewer than three seasons in Detroit.
- November 25 – Lou Boudreau, 31-year-old shortstop and player-manager of the world champion Cleveland Indians, wins the 1948 American League Most Valuable Player Award; he earns 22 of 24 first-place votes and bests runner-up Joe DiMaggio by 81 points in BBWAA balloting. Boudreau batted .355 with 199 hits, 18 homers (including a pair in the AL's pennant-clinching tie-breaker game), and 106 runs batted in. Using the post-1980s metric of wins above replacement, Boudreau's 1948 WAR of 10.4 leads the Junior Circuit.
- November 26 – National League president Ford Frick steps in and pays $350 for funeral services, including the cost of a coffin, for the unclaimed body of former Chicago Cubs slugger Hack Wilson, who led the NL in home runs four times between 1926 and 1930, and in the latter year bashed 56 homers (an NL record that stood for 68 years) and drove in 191 runs (still the MLB RBI all-time record). An alcoholic, Wilson died penniless at age 48 on November 23 after a fall at his Baltimore home; his body lies unidentified for three days in a mortuary.
- November 30 – Only three seasons after the halting start of the racial integration of "Organized Baseball," the Negro leagues reorganize. The Negro National League, founded in 1920 and in operation continuously since 1933, disbands. Some of its teams, such as the New York Cubans and Baltimore Elite Giants, join the rival Negro American League; its most famous franchise, the Homestead Grays, becomes a barnstorming team. The NNL's demise signals the end of the Negro World Series.

=== December ===
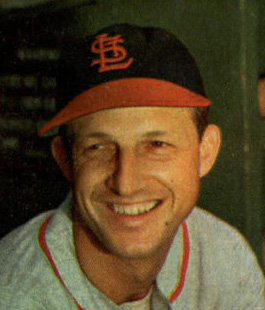
National League MVP Stan Musial

- December 2 – Stan Musial of the St. Louis Cardinals is selected 1948's National League Most Valuable Player. Setting personal bests in almost every category, Musial led the NL in batting average (.376), runs (135), hits (230), doubles (46), triples (18), RBI (131), on-base percentage (.450), slugging percentage (.702), OPS (1.152), total bases (.429), and WAR (11.3). Musial, 28, wins his third MVP trophy since 1943. Pitcher Johnny Sain of the Boston Braves finishes second in the balloting, 80 points behind the St. Louis star.
- December 3
  - Braves shortstop Alvin Dark wins the BBWAA's second MLB Rookie of the Year Award, winning 27 of 48 possible first-place votes to outdistance Gene Bearden and Richie Ashburn. It's the last year that a single "ROTY" award will be given across the 16 big-league teams: in 1949, separate NL and AL winners will be selected.
  - The New York Yankees release veteran shortstop Frankie Crosetti, ending his 17-year playing career. He will remain with the team as third-base coach through the 1968 season.
- December 7 – At Minor League Baseball's annual winter meetings in Minneapolis, 54 leagues vote unanimously to ban major league telecasts to markets located beyond 50 miles from the originating station; the vote is taken after attendance plunges in 1948 for teams located in the Northeast and Middle Atlantic regions where big-league franchises are clustered and TV broadcasts proliferate. At the major-league winter meetings a week later in Chicago, MLB magnates reject the ban.
- December 8 – The Pittsburgh Pirates trade young pitcher Cal McLish and three-time NL All-Star third baseman Frankie Gustine to the Chicago Cubs for southpaw Cliff Chambers and catcher Clyde McCullough.
- December 13 – In one of their rare missteps, the New York Yankees acquire right-hander Fred Sanford and catcher Roy Partee from the St. Louis Browns for pitchers Red Embree and Dick Starr, catcher Sherm Lollar and $100,000. The Yankees believe that Sanford, a hard thrower who'd lost 21 games for the lowly Browns, will transform into a consistent winner in 1949, but the pitcher quickly loses new manager Casey Stengel's confidence. Lollar, 24, has been stuck behind Yogi Berra in New York, but given the chance to play regularly in St. Louis, then Chicago, he will join Berra as one of the American League's top catchers of the 1950s.
- December 14:
  - The world-champion Cleveland Indians add to their starting pitching strength by obtaining future Hall-of-Fame right-hander Early Wynn from the Washington Senators, along with first baseman and former AL batting king Mickey Vernon, for pitchers Joe Haynes and Ed Klieman and first baseman Eddie Robinson. Playing for mostly poor teams, Wynn has compiled a 72–87 won–lost mark and 3.94 earned run average in 191 games for Washington since his 1939 debut; over the next nine years in Cleveland, he will win 20 or more games five times and average 18 victories a season.
  - The Chicago Cubs trade pitcher Hank Borowy and first baseman Eddie Waitkus to the Philadelphia Phillies for hurlers Monk Dubiel and Dutch Leonard.
- December 15 – "Pistol Pete" Reiser's once-brilliant tenure as the centerfielder of the Brooklyn Dodgers comes to an end when he's traded to the Boston Braves for infielder Nanny Fernandez and outfielder Mike McCormick. Reiser was one of the game's brightest young stars of the pre-World War II era, but a series of serious injuries, most of them caused by his fearless outfield play, have taken a heavy, career-altering toll on him.

== Movies ==
- The Babe Ruth Story

== Births ==
=== January ===
- January 1 – Randy Bobb
- January 5:
  - Charlie Hough
  - Bill Laxton
- January 10 – Larry Hardy
- January 11:
  - Rick Henninger
  - Glenn Redmon
- January 13 – Les Cain
- January 16 – Tsuneo Horiuchi
- January 19 – Ken Frailing
- January 22 – Fred Cambria
- January 25 – Ed Goodson
- January 27 – Tom Trebelhorn
- January 30 – Dave Moates

=== February ===
- February 6 – Doug Howard
- February 10:
  - Jim Barr
  - John Gamble
- February 12 – Francisco Estrada
- February 15 – Ron Cey
- February 21 – Bill Slayback
- February 22:
  - Bruce Christensen
  - Tom Griffin
  - Mike Rogodzinski
- February 26 – Hiromitsu Kadota
- February 28 – Mark Wiley

=== March ===
- March 4:
  - Tom Grieve
  - Leron Lee
- March 8 – Joe Staton
- March 9:
  - Darrel Chaney
  - John Curtis
  - Dan Neumeier
- March 10 – Wayne Twitchell
- March 11 – César Gerónimo
- March 12 – Bob Watkins
- March 13 – Steve Barber
- March 19 – Paul Powell
- March 20 – Chuck Seelbach
- March 22:
  - Jake Brown
  - Carlos Velázquez
- March 25 – Mike Nagy

=== April ===
- April 1 – Willie Montañez
- April 4 – Leon Hooten
- April 7 – Rick Sawyer
- April 10 – Lee Lacy
- April 18 – Ron Schueler
- April 19 – Rick Miller
- April 24 – Bob Beall
- April 28 – Pablo Torrealba
- April 30 – Mike Barlow

=== May ===
- May 1 – Von Joshua
- May 2 – Larry Gowell
- May 6 – Frankie Librán
- May 7 – Ken Hottman
- May 8:
  - Steve Braun
  - Miguel Puente
- May 14 – Dave LaRoche
- May 15:
  - Yutaka Enatsu
  - Billy North
- May 17 – Carlos May
- May 19 – Al Santorini
- May 23 – Reggie Cleveland
- May 24 – Hideji Kato
- May 26 – Bob Hansen
- May 27 – Gary Nolan

=== June ===
- June 2 – Joe Pactwa
- June 5 – Mark Schaeffer
- June 10 – Bob Randall
- June 11 – Dave Cash
- June 16 – Ron LeFlore
- June 17:
  - Dave Concepción
  - Gary Ryerson
- June 25 – Clay Kirby

=== July ===
- July 3 – Phil Meeler
- July 4:
  - Ed Armbrister
  - Wayne Nordhagen
- July 5 – Dave Lemonds
- July 7:
  - Bob Gallagher
  - Tommy Moore
- July 8 – Lerrin LaGrow
- July 10 – Rich Hand
- July 13 – Rob Belloir
- July 14:
  - Pepe Frías
  - Earl Williams
- July 21 – John Hart
- July 22 – Jesse Hudson
- July 24 – Mike Adams
- July 26 – John Knox
- July 29 – Hisashi Yamada

=== August ===
- August 1 – Tommy Smith
- August 4 – Johnny Grubb
- August 9:
  - Bill Campbell
  - Gary Timberlake
- August 13 – Erskine Thomason
- August 16 – Mike Jorgensen
- August 17 – Bill Parsons
- August 19 – John Boles
- August 21:
  - John Ellis
  - Craig Robinson
- August 23 – Ron Blomberg
- August 27 – Lew Beasley
- August 30 – Steve Simpson

=== September ===
- September 1 – Dick Lange
- September 11 – Jeff Newman
- September 18:
  - Ken Brett (d. 2003)
  - Lee Richard
- September 21:
  - Gary Lance
  - Aurelio López (d. 1992)
- September 24 – Eric Soderholm
- September 25 – Ray Busse
- September 27 – Carlos López
- September 30:
  - Craig Kusick
  - Rusty Torres

=== October ===
- October 1 – Bill Bonham
- October 4 – Dave Johnson
- October 8:
  - Rick Stelmaszek
  - Bernie Williams
- October 13 – Randy Moffitt
- October 14:
  - Ed Figueroa
  - Brent Strom
- October 19 – Rimp Lanier
- October 21 – Bill Russell
- October 26 – Toby Harrah
- October 31 – Mickey Rivers

=== November ===
- November 3:
  - Rick Kreuger
  - Ed Montague
- November 7:
  - Buck Martinez
  - Tom Walker
- November 16 – Don Hahn
- November 24 – Steve Yeager

=== December ===
- December 1 – George Foster
- December 2 – Wayne Simpson
- December 5 – Buddy Harris
- December 9 – Doc Medich
- December 11 – Gene Hiser
- December 14 – Ralph Garcia
- December 15 – Doug Rau
- December 20 – Jim Norris
- December 21 – Dave Kingman
- December 22 – Steve Garvey
- December 23 – Alec Distaso
- December 26:
  - Chris Chambliss
  - Dave Rader

== Deaths ==
=== January ===
- January 2 – Gordon Zeigler (also known as William "Doc" Zeigler), 49, 5 ft 4 in (1.63 m) southpaw who pitched for the 1920 Detroit Stars of the Negro National League.
- January 4 – Biff Schlitzer, 63, who pitched from 1908 through 1914 for the Philadelphia Athletics, Boston Red Sox and Buffalo Blues.
- January 8 – Howdy Caton, 53, shortstop for the Pittsburgh Pirates over parts of four seasons from 1917 to 1920.
- January 9 – Art Jahn, 52, part-time outfielder who played for the Chicago Cubs, New York Giants and Philadelphia Phillies during two seasons spanning 1925 to 1928.
- January 14:
  - Art Benedict, 85, second baseman who appeared in three games with the Philadelphia Quakers in 1883.
  - George Carr, 53, switch-hitting first- and third baseman who saw service with six Negro leagues teams—primarily the Hilldale Club and Kansas City Monarchs—between 1920 and 1934.
- January 23 – Frank Doljack, 40, outfielder who played for the Detroit Tigers from 1930 through 1934 and the Cleveland Indians in 1943.
- January 30 – Herb Pennock, 53, Hall of Fame pitcher for the Philadelphia Athletics, Boston Red Sox and New York Yankees in a span of 22 seasons from 1912 to 1934, who during his career posted a lifetime record of 240–161 with a 3.60 ERA in 617 games; collected a perfect 5–0 with a 1.95 ERA in six World Series trips—five with the Yankees, including their first World Series championship; general manager of Philadelphia Phillies from 1944 until his death.
- January 31 – Clarence Lehr, 61, who played some outfield and infield utility positions with the Philadelphia Phillies in 1911.

=== February ===
- February 1 – Jim McCormick, 79, infielder who played three games for the National League St. Louis Browns in 1892.
- February 10 – Bill Clancy, 68, first baseman for the 1905 Pittsburgh Pirates.
- February 14 – Mordecai Brown, 71, Hall of Fame pitcher whose loss of two fingers in a childhood accident gave him remarkable movement on pitches, winning 20 games six straight years for the Chicago Cubs, while posting a career record of 239–130 with a 2.06 earned run average; the third best ERA in Major League Baseball history amongst pitchers inducted into the Hall of Fame, as well as the best in MLB history for any pitcher with more than 200 wins.
- February 16 – Percy Coleman, 71, pitcher who played from 1897 to 1898 for the St. Louis Browns and Cincinnati Reds.
- February 19 – Bob Groom, 63, pitcher for the Washington Senators, St. Louis Terriers, St. Louis Browns and Cleveland Indians during 10 seasons from 1909 to 1918, who also hurled a no-hitter in 1917 against the eventual World Champion Chicago White Sox.
- February 21 – Irv Ray, 84, shortstop who played with the Boston Beaneaters of the National League in 1888 and 1889, and the Baltimore Orioles of the American Association from 1889 to 1891.

=== March ===
- March 1 – Rebel Oakes, 64, center fielder who played from 1909 through 1913 with the Cincinnati Reds and St. Louis Cardinals, and later served as a player-manager for the Pittsburgh Rebels of the outlaw Federal League in the 1914 and 1915 seasons.
- March 10 – Stub Brown, 77, pitcher for the Baltimore Orioles from 1893 to 1894 and the Cincinnati Reds in 1897.
- March 17 – Ike Butler, 74, pitcher for the 1902 Baltimore Orioles.
- March 18 – Fritz Von Kolnitz, 54, third baseman who played for the Cincinnati Reds from 1914 to 1915 and the Chicago White Sox in 1916.
- March 23 – Dutch Meier, 68, outfielder and shortstop who played for the Pittsburgh Pirates in 1906.
- March 24 – Jimmy Bannon, 76, outfielder for the St. Louis Browns in 1893 and the Boston Beaneaters from 1894 to 1896.
- March 30 – Charlie Krause, 76, second baseman for the 1901 Cincinnati Reds.

=== April ===
- April 1 – Heinie Jantzen, 57, outfielder for the 1912 St. Louis Browns.
- April 2 – Joe Hewitt, 62, infielder who played in the Negro National League (NNL) between 1920 and 1931, chiefly for St. Louis and Detroit.
- April 3 – Candy Jim Taylor, 64, third baseman who appeared for multiple Negro leagues clubs between 1920 and 1935; longtime manager, especially for St. Louis Stars and Homestead Grays, winning three NNL pennants combined, plus two Negro World Series titles as manager of the Grays of 1942–1943.
- April 16 – Dick Kauffman, 59, first baseman who played for the St. Louis Browns in the 1914 and 1915 seasons.
- April 17 – Pat Deisel, 71, catcher for the 1902 Brooklyn Superbas and the 1903 Cincinnati Reds.
- April 19 – Hen Jordan, 54, catcher for Baltimore and Harrisburg of the Eastern Colored League from 1923 to 1925.
- April 25 – Bertrum Hunter, 42, Negro leagues pitcher who led the East–West League (10–2) and Negro National League (11–3) in games won in back-to-back seasons (1932, 1933).
- April 27 – Ad Yale, 78, who appeared in four games with the Brooklyn Superbas in the 1905 season.

=== May ===
- May 2 – Dick Cogan, 76, two-way player for the Baltimore Orioles, Chicago Orphans and New York Giants over part of three seasons spanning 1897–1900.
- May 4 – John Dolan, 80, pitcher who played for the Cincinnati Reds, Columbus Solons, Washington Senators, St. Louis Browns and Chicago Colts in a span of five seasons between 1890 and 1895.
- May 7 – Hi Ladd, 78, backup outfielder for the Pittsburgh Pirates and Boston Beaneaters in the 1898 season.
- May 18 – Frank Schneiberg, 68, pitcher for the 1910 Brooklyn Superbas.
- May 19 – Frank Browning, 65, pitcher for the Detroit Tigers in its 1910 season.
- May 26 – Bill Sweeney, 62, valuable middle infielder and third baseman whose eight-year National League career began and ended with Chicago (1907, 1914) but was largely spent with the Boston Doves/Rustlers/Braves (1907–1913); stellar 1912 season included .344 batting average, third in NL, with 204 hits, second in the circuit; also set an NL record in 1912 with 425 putouts by a second baseman that would stand for 21 years, while leading the NL both in assists (475) and double plays (75).

=== June ===
- June 5 – Jack McCarthy, 78, left fielder who played for five teams in 12 seasons between 1893 and 1907, whose career batting average of .287 in 1,092 games was achieved during the hard hitting era of the late 1890s and the dead-ball era of the early 1900s, as his .321 average with the Cleveland Blues in 1901 was ninth best in the American League.
- June 7 – Tom Glover, 35, left-hander who hurled primarily for the Columbus/Washington/Baltimore Elite Giants of the Negro National League between 1934 and 1945.
- June 10 – Hosea Siner, 63, backup infielder for the 1909 Boston Doves.
- June 12 – Rasty Wright, 52, pitcher who played for the St. Louis Browns in part of five seasons between 1917 and 1923.
- June 26 – Jimmy Esmond, 58, shortstop who played from 1911 to 1912 with the Cincinnati Reds, and for the Indianapolis Hoosiers and Newark Peppers of the outlaw Federal League in a span of two seasons from 1914 to 1915.
- June 27 – Bull Barbour, 55, first baseman for the 1922 Pittsburgh Keystones of the Negro National League.

=== July ===
- July 1 – Pete Knisely, 60, outfielder who played for the Cincinnati Reds and Chicago Cubs over parts of four seasons from 1912 to 1915.
- July 3 – Charles Witherow, 96, pitcher who appeared in just one game for the Washington Nationals in 1875; last surviving player of the National Association of Professional Baseball Players, predecessor of the National League.
- July 5 – Ed Smith, 84, Canadian pitcher who played in 1884 for the Baltimore Monumentals of the Union Association.
- July 11 – Bert Hall, 58, for the 1911 Philadelphia Phillies.
- July 18 – Chick Hartley, 67, outfielder who played for the New York Giants in the 1902 season.
- July 19 – Charlie See, 51, outfielder who played from 1919 through 1921 for the Cincinnati Reds.
- July 26 – Homer Davidson, 63, catcher and right fielder who appeared in four games for the Cleveland Naps in 1914.
- July 27 – Joe Tinker, 68, Hall of Fame shortstop who along second baseman Johnny Evers and first baseman Frank Chance anchored a famed infield double play combination, which is memorialized in the legendary poem Baseball's Sad Lexicon, as the trio led the Chicago Cubs during the glory years of 1906–1910 to four National League pennants and two World Series titles.
- July 29 – Arnie Stone, 55, pitcher for the Pittsburgh Pirates in the 1923 and 1924 seasons.

=== August ===
- August 7 – Jimmy Wacker, 64, pitcher who played with the Pittsburgh Pirates in the 1909 season.
- August 9:
  - Chick Bowen, 51, backup outfielder for the 1919 New York Giants.
  - Harry Lord, 66, third baseman who played from 1907 through 1910 for the Boston Americans and Red Sox, before joining the Chicago White Sox from 1910 to 1914 and the Buffalo Blues in 1915.
- August 12 – Billy Graulich, 80, catcher and first baseman who played for the 1891 Philadelphia Phillies.
- August 13 – Nig Perrine, 63, backup infielder for the 1907 Washington Senators.
- August 14 – Phil Collins, 46, pitcher who posted an 80–85 (4.66) record in 292 games for the Chicago Cubs, Philadelphia Phillies and St. Louis Cardinals over eight seasons between 1923 and 1935; his home park for most of his career was Baker Bowl, a notorious batter-friendly stadium in the lively ball era.
- August 16 – Babe Ruth, 53, Hall of Fame right fielder and left-handed pitcher, who is considered the greatest star in baseball history, setting enduring records for most home runs in a season (60) and lifetime (714), as well as most career RBI (2,213); lifetime .342 hitter also posted a 94–46 record and 2.28 ERA as a pitcher while playing for seven World Series champions, first with Boston Red Sox (1915, 1916, 1918), then New York Yankees (1923, 1927, 1928, 1932); won 1923 MVP award, at a time when AL rules prohibited winning it more than once; batted .326 with 42 hits (15 homers and 33 RBI) in 41 World Series games, after going 3–0 (0.87 ERA) in three Fall Classic starts (1916, 1918), setting a record for consecutive shutout innings pitched (292/3) that lasted for 43 years.
- August 19 – Fred Odwell, 75, outfielder for the Cincinnati Reds during four seasons from 1904 to 1907, who led the National league in home runs in 1905.
- August 20 – Walter Blair, 64, catcher for the New York Highlanders from 1907 through 1911, who later played and managed for the Buffalo Buffeds/Blues of the Federal League during their only two seasons in 1914 and 1915.
- August 26 – Rip Cannell, 68, outfielder who played from 1904 to 1905 for the Boston Beaneaters of the National League.
- August 29 – Charlie Graham, 70, catcher for the 1906 Boston Red Sox, before becoming manager and owner of the PCL San Francisco Seals.

=== September ===
- September 3 – Bert Husting, 60, two-star athlete in the 1890s University of Wisconsin teams, who later pitched in the majors for the Pittsburgh Pirates, Milwaukee Brewers, Boston Americans and Philadelphia Athletics from 1900 to 1902.
- September 8 – Bill Byers, 70, backup catcher for the 1904 St. Louis Cardinals.
- September 18 – Art Devlin, 68, third baseman who played from 1904 through 1911 with the New York Giants and the Boston Braves from 1912 to 1913, also a member of the 1905 World Series champion team.
- September 23 – Rich Durning, 55, pitcher for the Brooklyn Robins from 1917 to 1918.
- September 26:
  - Hosea Allen, 29, pitcher for three Negro American League clubs between 1941 and 1947.
  - Elmer Leifer, 55, who made 10 appearances as a pinch hitter with the Chicago White Sox in 1921.
- September 27 – Fred Wilson, 40, outfielder/pitcher for the Newark Eagles, New York Cubans and Cincinnati Clowns of the Negro leagues between 1939 and 1945.

=== October ===
- October 1 – Lew Camp, 80, 19th-century Major League Baseball infielder who played with the St. Louis Browns in 1892 and for the Chicago Colts from 1893 to 1894.
- October 7 – Doc Imlay, 59, pitcher for the 1913 Philadelphia Phillies.
- October 8 – Al Orth, 76, softly thrower but curveball specialist, who pitched with the Philadelphia Phillies, Washington Senators and New York Highlanders in a span of 15 seasons from 1895 to 1909, winning 204 games for them, yet struck out just 948 batters in 3,354 innings of work, while remaining an effective pitcher during the early years of the American League, posting career season-highs with 27 wins and 133 strikeouts for the Highlanders in 1906.
- October 12 – Bill Gardner, 82, pitcher who played three games for the Baltimore Orioles of the American Association in 1887.
- October 20 – Ed Kusel, 62, pitcher for the 1909 St. Louis Browns.
- October 24:
  - Harry Grabiner, 57, minority owner and vice president of the Cleveland Indians since 1946; previously served for 30 years (1915–1945) in the front office of the Chicago White Sox.
  - Jack Thoney, 68, well-traveled outfielder and infielder who played from 1902 through 1911 for the Cleveland Bronchos, Baltimore Orioles, Washington Senators, New York Highlanders and Boston Red Sox.
- October 25 – Jerry Kane, 83, catcher and first baseman for the 1890 St. Louis Browns of the American Association.
- October 28 – Roy Ellam, 62, shortstop who played with the Cincinnati Reds in the 1909 season and for the Pittsburgh Pirates in 1918.
- October 31 – Dick Redding, 58, star pitcher of the Negro leagues who set numerous strikeout records and pitched several no-hitters.

=== November ===
- November 1 – Fred Mollenkamp, 58, first baseman who played for the Philadelphia Phillies in the 1914 season.
- November 4 – Jake Powell, 40, outfielder for the Washington Senators, New York Yankees and Philadelphia Phillies in a span of 11 seasons from 1930 to 1945, who helped the Yankees win the World Series every year from 1936 to 1939, and hit a .455 average in the 1936 series.
- November 7 – Jake Smith, 61, pitcher who appeared in two games for the Philadelphia Phillies during the 1911 season.
- November 15 – Joe Wagner, 59, second baseman for the Cincinnati Reds in the 1915 season.
- November 18 – Joe Regan, 76, outfielder for the 1898 New York Giants.
- November 22 – Bob Emmerich, 57, center fielder for the Boston Braves in the 1923 season.
- November 23 – Hack Wilson, 48, Hall of Fame center fielder for four different clubs during 12 seasons from !923–1934, most prominently with the Chicago Cubs between 1926 and 1931, who finished his career with a lifetime .307 batting average, 244 home runs, 1,063 RBI and four home run titles, hitting 56 long balls in 1930, to set a National League record that stood for 68 years, while driving in 191 runs in the same season, which still the all-time major league record.
- November 30 – Frank Bowerman, 79, catcher and battery-mate for Christy Mathewson on the New York Giants, who also played for the Baltimore Orioles and Pittsburgh Pirates, and later managed the 1909 Boston Doves.

=== December ===
- December 3:
  - Gus Bono, 54, pitcher for the 1920 Washington Senators.
  - Fred Buckingham, 72, pitcher who played for the Washington Senators in its 1895 season.
- December 6 – Bill Dammann, 76, pitcher who played from 1897 through 1899 for the Cincinnati Reds.
- December 8 – Pelham Ballenger, 54, third baseman for the Washington Senators in the 1928 season.
- December 26 – Joe Pate, 56, pitcher for the Philadelphia Athletics over parts of two seasons from 1926 to 1927.
- December 27 – Marv Peasley, 60, pitcher who appeared in two games for the Detroit Tigers in 1910.
- December 29 – Larry Hoffman, 70, third baseman for the 1901 Chicago Orphans.
