= 1901 in Ireland =

- Centuries: 18th; 19th; 20th; 21st
- Decades: 1880s; 1890s; 1900s; 1910s; 1920s
- See also: 1901 in the United Kingdom; Other events of 1901; List of years in Ireland

Events in the year 1901 in Ireland.

== Events ==
- 1 January – The centenary of the Act of Union was celebrated by British forces in Ireland.
- 3 January – Despite some opposition Drogheda Corporation voted to confer the freedom of the town on President Kruger of the Boers.
- 22 January – Queen Victoria died in London. In Dublin theatres were closed and the blinds were drawn at the General Post Office.
- 24 January – Edward VII was proclaimed King in Ireland in a state ceremony at Dublin Castle.
- 2 February – Banks, public offices, theatres and music halls were closed in Dublin for the funeral of Queen Victoria.
- 19 February – Thomas O'Donnell, a Nationalist Member of Parliament, was stopped by the Speaker from addressing the British House of Commons in Irish.
- 31 March – The Irish population census was taken. The population of the entire island was 4.5 million people. Roman Catholics outnumbered Anglicans and Presbyterians by almost three to one.
- 16 June – The Catholic Cathedral of St. Eunan and St Columba opened in Letterkenny.
- 11 July – The RMS Celtic was launched at the Harland and Wolff shipyard in Belfast. She was the largest ship in the world and would sail between Liverpool and New York.
- The Jammet Hotel and Restaurant opened in Dublin.
- The Barry's Tea company was founded in Cork.
- The first Roches Stores shop opened.

== Arts and literature ==
- 21 October – Douglas Hyde's play Casadh an tSúgáin was premièred by Conradh na Gaeilge's Amateur Dramatic Society for the Irish Literary Theatre at the Gaiety Theatre, Dublin, featuring the author and Máire Ní Chinnéide and directed by William Fay and George Moore.
- Patrick S. Dinneen's Cormac Ó Conaill became the first novel in Irish published complete in book form.
- George Moore's novel Sister Theresa was published.

== Sport ==
=== Association football ===
- International
  23 February – Scotland 11–0 Ireland (in Glasgow)
  9 March – England 3–0 Ireland (in Southampton)
  23 March – Ireland 0–1 Wales (in Belfast)
  Irish League
  Winners: Distillery
  Irish Cup
  Winners: Cliftonville 1–0 Freebooters
- St Columb's Court, a team from Derry, joined the Irish Football League, but only lasted one season.

=== Athletics ===
- 5 August – Peter O'Connor set the first International Association of Athletics Federations recognised long jump world record, of 24 ft 11¾ in. (7.61 m), in Dublin. It remained unbeaten for 20 years and an Irish record for 89.

== Births ==
- 11 February – Roddy Connolly, Labour Party TD, Seanad member, son of James Connolly (died 1980).
- 15 February – Brendan Bracken, businessman and British cabinet minister (died 1958).
- 10 May – John Desmond Bernal, scientist (died 1971).
- 5 June – Wilfred Hutton, cricketer (died 1978).
- 7 June – Anthony Barry, businessman, Fine Gael party TD, Seanad member and Lord Mayor of Cork (died 1983).
- 8 June – John O'Sullivan, Fine Gael party TD, and Senator (died 1990).
- 12 June – Jimmy Elwood, footballer (died 1936 in Northern Ireland).
- 18 June – Denis Johnston, dramatist (died 1984).
- 5 July – Matt Goff, Kildare Gaelic footballer (died 1956).
- 7 July – Seán Clancy, oldest Irish War of Independence veteran (died 2006)
- 17 July – Patrick Smith, TD and Cabinet minister (died 1982).
- 6 October – Todd Andrews, Irish revolutionary and public servant (died 1985).
- 7 November – Norah McGuinness, artist (died 1980).
- 21 November – Finlay Jackson, cricketer and rugby player (died 1941 in Northern Ireland).
- 23 December – Seán Clancy, veteran of the Irish War of Independence (died 2006)
- 26 December – Gustavus Kelly, cricketer (died [1980).

== Deaths ==
- 8 January – John Barry, soldier, posthumous recipient of the Victoria Cross for gallantry in 1901 at Monument Hill, South Africa (born 1873).
- 22 January – Queen Victoria, monarch of the United Kingdom of Great Britain and Ireland (born 1819).
- 14 March – Arthur Gore, 5th Earl of Arran, Anglo-Irish peer and diplomat (born 1839).
- 8 April – Edward Ernest Bowen, schoolmaster (born 1836).
- 28 April – James Stephens, founding member of the Fenian Brotherhood movement (born 1825).
- 1 July – James Bell, United States Army soldier, awarded the Medal of Honor in 1876 during the Indian Wars (born 1845).
- 20 August – James Owens, soldier, recipient of the Victoria Cross for gallantry in 1854 at the Siege of Sebastopol in the Crimean War (born 1829).
- 8 September – Michael Morris, 1st Baron Killanin, jurist, politician, Lord Chief Justice of Ireland (born 1826).
- 16 November – William George Nicholas Manley, recipient of the Victoria Cross for gallantry in 1864 near Tauranga, New Zealand (born 1831).
- 4 December – William MacCormac, surgeon (born 1836).

== See also ==
- 1901 in Scotland
- 1901 in Wales
