= Edward Clancy =

Edward Clancy may refer to:

- Edward Clancy (cardinal) (1923–2014), Australian Roman Catholic
- Edward J. Clancy Jr., American mayor of Lynn, Massachusetts
- Ed Clancy (born 1985), British bicycle racer
- Ed and Betty Clancy, co-founders of the Clancy's, a famous restaurant in New Orleans

== See also ==
- Bill Clancy (William Edward Clancy, 1879–1948), baseball player
- Clancy (disambiguation)
- Edward (disambiguation)
