= Joseph Clancy =

Joseph Clancy may refer to:

- Joseph Clancy (Secret Service) (born 1955), American law enforcement official
- Joseph Clancy (politician) (1890–1970), American businessman and politician in Wisconsin
- Joseph Clancy (Medal of Honor) (1863–1929), United States Navy sailor and Medal of Honor recipient
- Joe Clancy (born 1990), American football quarterback
