= Clancy (disambiguation) =

Clancy is both a given name and a surname, of Irish origin.

Clancy may also refer to:

== Music ==
- Clancy (band), British pub-rock band
- The Clancy Brothers, Irish folk music singing group
- Clancy (album), by Twenty One Pilots, 2024

== Places ==
- Clancy, Montana, United States, an unincorporated community and census-designated place
- Clancy Branch, Montana, a stream

== See also ==
- Clancy's, a restaurant in New Orleans
- Clancey, a list of people with the surname
