= Mac Fhlannchaidh =

Gaelic-Irish surname

Mac Fhlannchaidh was the surname of two unrelated Gaelic-Irish families, of Breifne and Thomond.

Mac Fhlannchaidh of Breifne were chiefs of Dartraighe, in what is now County Leitrim.

The Mac Fhlannchaidh of Thomond were a branch of the Mac Conmara family, acted as hereditary lawyers to the O'Briens. Their homeland was in the barony of Corcomroe in north County Clare.

It is now often rendered as Clancy.

== See also ==
- Murchadh Mac Fhlannchaidh, died 1482.
- Aedh Mac Fhlannchaidh, died 1492.
