= Sean Clancy =

Sean Clancy may refer to:

- Seán Clancy (1901–2006), member of the Irish Republican Army during the War of Independence, later an Irish Defence Forces lieutenant-colonel
- Seán Clancy (Irish general) (fl. 1984–present), former Chief of Staff of the Irish Defence Forces
- Seán Clancy (composer) (born 1984), Irish composer and lecturer
- Sean Clancy (American football) (born 1956), American football linebacker
- Sean Clancy (fighter) (born 1988), Irish kickboxer
- Sean Clancy (footballer) (born 1987), English footballer
