= Senator Clancy =

Senator Clancy may refer to:

- Edward J. Clancy Jr. (1950–2021), Massachusetts State Senate
- Joseph Clancy (politician) (1890–1970), Wisconsin State Senate
- Patty Clancy (born 1952), Ohio State Senate
