= Jim Clancy =

Jim Clancy may refer to:

- Jim Clancy (baseball) (1955–2025), American Major League Baseball pitcher
- Jim Clancy (journalist), American former journalist for CNN
- Jim Clancy (Ghost Whisperer), a character from the U.S. television show Ghost Whisperer

== See also ==
- James Clancy (disambiguation)
