= Clancee =

Clancee is a given name. Notable people with the given name include:

== People ==
- Clancee Pearce (born 1990), Australian rules footballer

== Fictional characters ==
- Clancee, a character in Ninjago

== See also ==
- Clancy
- Clancey
