= Thomas Clancy =

Thomas or Tom Clancy may refer to:

- Thomas K. Clancy, professor of law at the University of Mississippi School of Law
- Thomas Owen Clancy, American academic and historian
- T. Frank Clancy (1871–1936), American politician and businessman
- Tom Clancy (Australian footballer) (1887–1957), Australian rules footballer
- Tom Clancy (1947–2013), American author
- Tom Clancy (Canadian football) (1872–1938), Canadian football coach and player
- Tom Clancy (Gaelic footballer) (born 1992), Irish Gaelic footballer
- Tom Clancy (rugby union) (born 1962), Irish rugby player
- Tom Clancy (singer) (1924–1990), member of the Irish folk singing group The Clancy Brothers
