= Aedh Mac Fhlannchaidh =

Aedh Mac Fhlannchaidh (died 1492) was an Irish brehon lawyer and Ollamh of Thomond.

Mac Fhlannchaidh was a native of Corcomroe, County Clare. In 1482, Murchadh Mac Fhlannchaidh, his designated successor, died. It is unknown what relationship they bore. Aedh himself died ten years later, according to the Annals of the Four Masters:

- 1492.34 Hugh Mac Clancy, Chief Brehon and Professor of Law in Thomond, died.
