= Murchadh Mac Fhlannchaidh =

Irish brehon lawyer

Murchadh Mac Fhlannchaidh (died 1482) was an Irish brehon lawyer.

Mac Fhlannchaidh was a member of a family native to north Thomond, and the designated heir of the then Ollamh of Thomond, Aedh Mac Fhlannchaidh. However he died before succeeding, the same year as An Cosnamhach Mac Fhlannchaidh

The Annals of the Four Masters contains their joint obituary:

- 1482.Murtough Mac Clancy, intended Ollav of Thomond, and Cosnamhach, son of Conor Oge Mac Clancy, died.
