= John Clancy =

John Clancy may refer to:

== Politicians ==
- John Clancy (Labour politician), leader of Birmingham City Council
- John Michael Clancy (1837–1903), United States Representative from New York
- John R. Clancy (1859–1932), United States Representative from New York
- John T. Clancy (1903–1985), U.S. politician from Brooklyn, New York City
- J. J. Clancy (North Dublin MP) (1847–1928), Irish Member of Parliament North Dublin, 1885–1918
- J. J. Clancy (Sinn Féin politician) (1891–1932), Irish Teachta Dála North Sligo, 1918–1921

== Sports ==
- Jack Clancy (born 1944), American football player
- Jack Clancy (Australian footballer) (1934–2014), Australian rules footballer

== Others ==
- John Clancy (Medal of Honor) (1860s–?), American soldier and Medal of Honor recipient
- John Clancy (playwright), American playwright and theater director
- John Joseph Clancy (bishop) (1856–1912), Bishop of Elphin from 1895 to 1912
- John S. J. Clancy (1895–1970), Australian judge
- John William Clancy (1888–1969), U.S. federal judge
- John Clancy, American theater composer and orchestrator
