= Bull Barbour =

American baseball player

- First baseman
- Born: October 23, 1892; Greenfield, Ohio, U.S.
- Died: June 27, 1948 (aged 55); Greenfield, Ohio, U.S.
- Threw: Right

Negro league baseball debut
- 1921, for the Pittsburgh Keystones

Last appearance
- 1922, for the Pittsburgh Keystones
- Stats at Baseball Reference

Teams
- Pittsburgh Keystones (1921–1922)

Elmore B. Barbour (October 23, 1892 – June 27, 1948), nicknamed "Bull", was an American Negro league first baseman in the 1920s.

A native of Greenfield, Ohio, Barbour made his Negro leagues debut in 1921 with the Pittsburgh Keystones, and played with Pittsburgh again in 1922. He died in Greenfield in 1948 at age 55.
