= Michael Martin Clancy =

Irish-Australian Roman Catholic priest

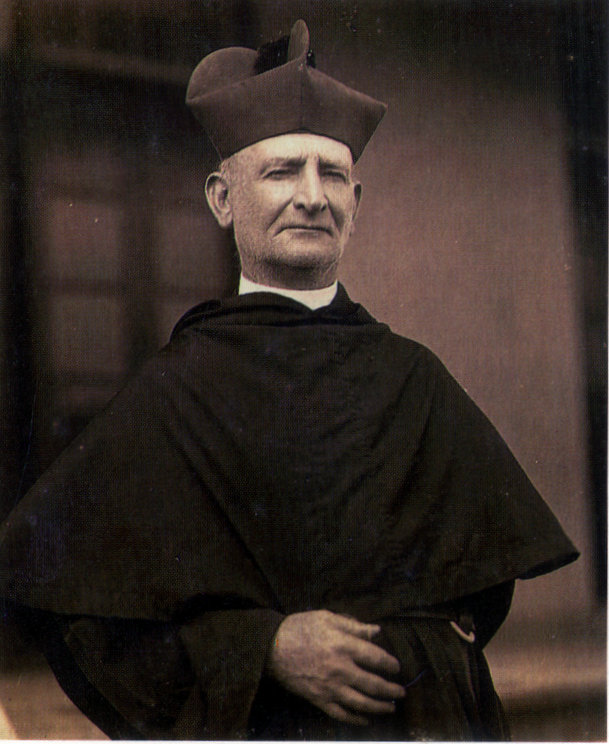
Father Michael Martin Clancy OAS

Father Michael Martin Clancy OSA (1868–1931) was an Irish-Australian Roman Catholic priest. He was the first resident Parish Priest in Geraldton, a town and parish in North Queensland, Australia. He was an inspirational parish priest who developed the Parish, established Catholic education in the Johnstone River district and built Innisfail's present Mother of Good Counsel Church. He played an important part in the development in the town and the district. Father Clancy was enthusiastically involved in the life of the town, local committees and governing bodies. He was instrumental in the changing of Geraldton's name to Innisfail in 1910. He also advocated for forging a link to the Atherton Tableland and the use of Mourilyan Harbour by shipping. Mount Father Clancy Garreth McGonnell near the Beatrice River was named in his honour.

== Early life ==
Michael Clancy was born in Loughill, County Limerick, August 1868. As the son of a farmer, he was educated in animal husbandry, a skill that was to be of great assistance to him in his life in Innisfail. He was ordained in Ireland by Bishop John Hutchinson who was recruiting priests for the North Queensland Vicariate in Cooktown.

== Appointment to Geraldton ==
In return for payment of his education costs, Father Clancy guaranteed a permanent commitment to the Cooktown Vicariate. Father Clancy arrived in Cooktown on 30 October 1895. As part of his duties as an assistant priest to Father Thomas Corcoran in Cairns, he made several visits to Geraldton. After the people of Geraldton asked repeatedly for a permanent priest, Father Clancy was appointed to the new Parish of Geraldton in 1898 as the resident parish priest. His first duty was to repair the Church which was badly eaten by termites. He visited all over his extensive parish on horseback, sometimes riding bareback. He rode the 90 mile track to Cardwell through crocodile infested waters and over mountain ranges bare back. This prompted the parishioners in Cardwell to present him with a saddle on one of his visits.

Father Clancy's influence spread over the whole district. Within a few years, he had acquired land at Daradgee and employed workers to run the newly established church farm. This was a way of raising funds for the church used in Ireland. Before long, there was a church orchard at East Innisfail and another church farm at Bamboo Creek where Father Clancy ran cattle. There were very few projects that he was not involved in. In 1910, when confusion arose between Geraldton in Western Australia and Geraldton in Queensland, it was decided by the Queensland Government that Geraldton should change its name. Father Clancy was one of the committee considering a new name. On Father Clancy's suggestion the name Innisfail was chosen so that the connection with Thomas Henry FitzGerald, the founder of the sugar industry in the Johnstone River district, would not be lost. At various times he was a member of the Chamber of Commerce and in 1912 was a member of the Johnstone River Agricultural Society. Father Clancy was a member of the Railway League which was instrumental in having the main northern rail route re-drawn to include Innisfail in 1914.

== Church buildings ==
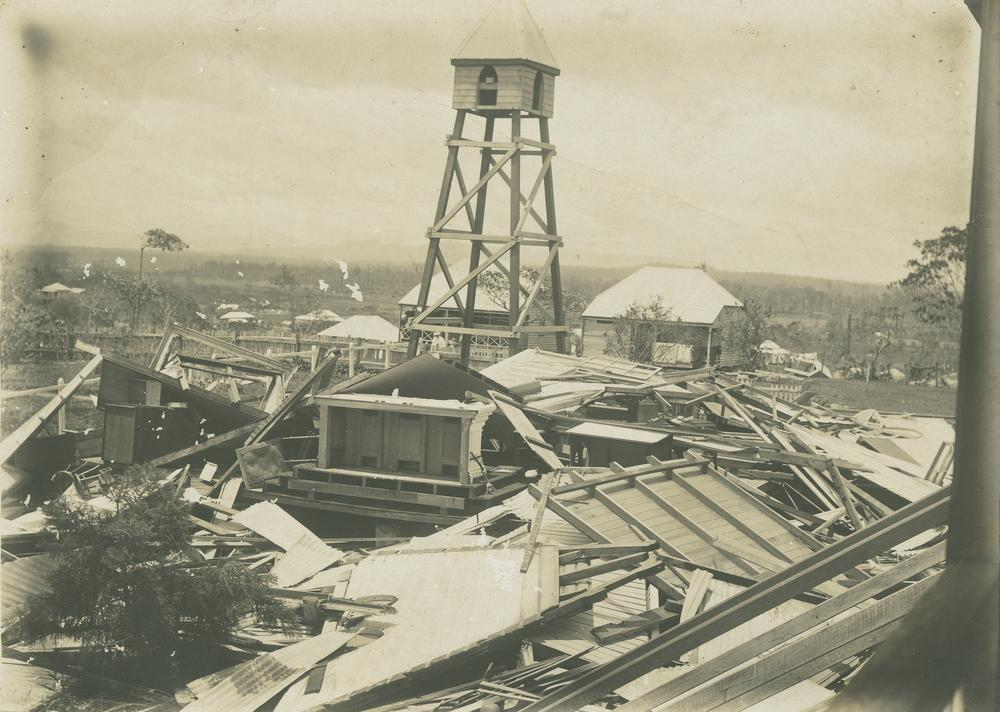
Ruins of the church after the 1906 cyclone

The 1906 Queensland cyclone destroyed the Church but the bell tower standing beside it survived. A new church was built of silky oak and with two sets of stumps supporting the frame to make it stronger but this was not enough to save it from the 1918 Innisfail cyclone. After the cyclone, the silky oak framework of the church was visible lying on its side but the priory was destroyed and the school razed to its floor boards. In 1920, the community began to fund raise for a new church that would withstand cyclones. Funds were raised by cake stalls, raffles, dances and concerts. 12,000 pounds were raised over four years, half of it in direct donations, many of them from towns people who were not Catholics. The plans for the church were drawn up in 1922 by Maurice Lordan. Father Clancy had decided that the new church was to be built of concrete and devised a method for transporting sand and gravel to the building site at minimum cost. The plan involved gaining permission to construct a section of portable track to meet the existing CSR tram-track so that gravel could be collected from the North Johnstone River at Goondi and carted to the building site in boxed cane trams drawn along the track by horses. Builders and volunteers came from all over the parish during construction. Mother of Good Counsel Church was blessed and opened on August 5, 1928. Aware of the large debt remaining on the church, Father Clancy had collectors among the large crowd present at the opening and the church debt was considerably reduced that afternoon.

In 1930, he was ordered to take a holiday and was farewelled by the whole town. On his return, a 400-guest reception was held, and he was appointed to a committee to enquire into direst shipping between Brisbane and Mourilyan Harbour. He was a strong advocate for the opening up of the Palmerston Highway from the Atherton Tablelands to Innisfail and the developing of Mourilyan Harbour as a port. Mount Father Clancy near the Beatrice River was named in his honour.

== Death ==
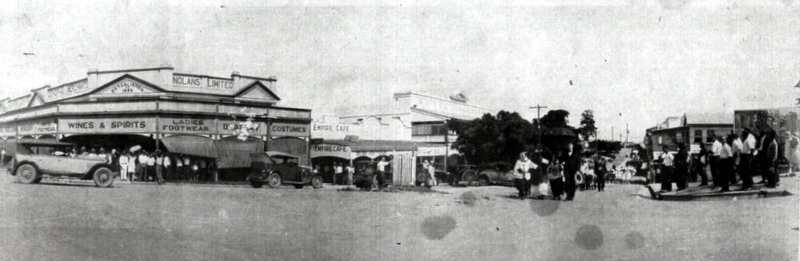
Funeral procession in Innisfail

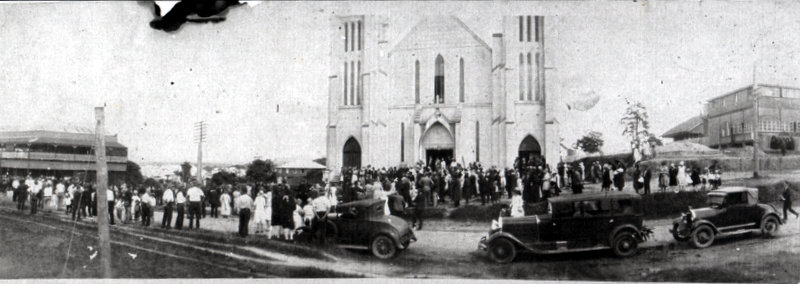
Cars outside Mother of Good Counsel Church

In 1931, the parishioners decided to build a retaining wall to reinforce the grounds of Mother of Good Counsel Church. While digging a trench as part of the effort, Father Clancy suffered a stroke and collapsed. He died in hospital on 20 May 1931. Permission was given for Father Clancy to be buried in the church as a tribute to a man who had tirelessly served not only his parishioners but also the people of the whole Johnstone River District.

Father Michael Clancy's Requiem Mass and funeral was on Friday 22 May. Innisfail came to a standstill as the Funeral Procession made its way through the streets and back to the church. Many people wept openly. Father Clancy was buried in front of the Shrine to Mary, Mother of Good Counsel, a cross inlaid in the floor indicating his tomb. The Bishop of Cooktown, Bishop Heavy said in his panegyric," I ask you not to forget this truly great man..... who for many years lived amongst you, prayed for you and spent himself for your spiritual and temporal good." Upon his death, Clancy specified in his will that his remaining worldly possessions were to be inherited by the Vicar Apostolic of Cooktown.

Clancy's portrait was hung in the Johnstone Shire Council board room.
