= Wilfred Hutton =

Irish cricketer (1901–1978)

Personal information
- Full name: Wilfred Noel Maxwell Hutton
- Born: 5 June 1901; Summerhill, Ireland
- Died: 12 September 1978 (aged 77); Carrigaline, Munster, Ireland
- Batting: Right-handed

Domestic team information
- Years: Team
- 1922: Dublin University

Career statistics
Competition	First-class
Matches	1
Runs scored	2
Batting average	1.00
100s/50s	–/–
Top score	2
Catches/stumpings	–/–
- Source: Cricinfo, 10 January 2022

Wilfred Noel Maxwell Hutton (5 June 1901, in Dublin, Ireland – 12 September 1978, in County Cork) was an Irish cricketer. A right-handed batsman, he played once for the Ireland cricket team in 1927 and also played first-class cricket for Dublin University.

Educated at Shrewsbury School where he was coached at cricket by Neville Cardus, he attended Trinity College Dublin, playing cricket whilst there, including a first-class match against Essex in July 1922, his only first-class match, and played against the West Indies the following year. He played his one and only game for Ireland in August 1927, against the MCC at Lord's. The match was badly affected by rain and he did not bat or bowl for the duration. He continued to play club cricket until 1937.

Following his cricket career, Hutton accepted a position as headmaster of a school in Bangor, County Down. One of his students at the school was future Liberal Democrats leader Paddy Ashdown. He retired in 1963 and settled in County Cork, where his life was disrupted by a rather bizarre incident. Hutton was a former British Army officer (he had been commissioned into the Royal Army Service Corps in March 1941), and one man believed that this must make him an MI6 agent and planned to assassinate him. The Garda Síochána intervened before this could happen.
