= Gordon Zeigler =

American baseball player

- Pitcher
- Born: September 14, 1899; Chilton County, Alabama, U.S.
- Died: January 2, 1948 (aged 48); Detroit, Michigan, U.S.
- Batted: Unknown Threw: Left

Negro league baseball debut
- 1921, for the Detroit Stars

Last appearance
- 1921, for the Detroit Stars

Teams
- Detroit Stars (1921)

Gordon Zeigler (September 14, 1899 – January 2, 1948) was an American baseball pitcher in the Negro leagues. He played with the Detroit Stars in 1921. In some sources, he is listed as William "Doc" Ziegler.
