= Clancey =

Clancey is a surname. Notable people with the surname include:

- George Clancey (1881–1921), American actor
- Julia Clancey (early 21st c.), London-based fashion designer
- Margaret Clancey (1897–1989), American film editor
- Phillip Clancey (1917–2001), British-South African ornithologist
- William Clancey (born 1952), American computer scientist

== See also ==
- Clancy
- Clancee
