= John Clancy (Medal of Honor) =

- Born: c. 1868; New York, U.S.
- Died: July 11, 1932 (aged 63–64); Fort Riley, Kansas, U.S.
- Military career
- Allegiance: United States
- Branch: U.S. Army
- Service years: 1887–1892; 1892–1894
- Highest rank: First sergeant
- Unit: 1st Artillery Regiment
- Battles: Indian Wars Wounded Knee Massacre
- Awards: Medal of Honor

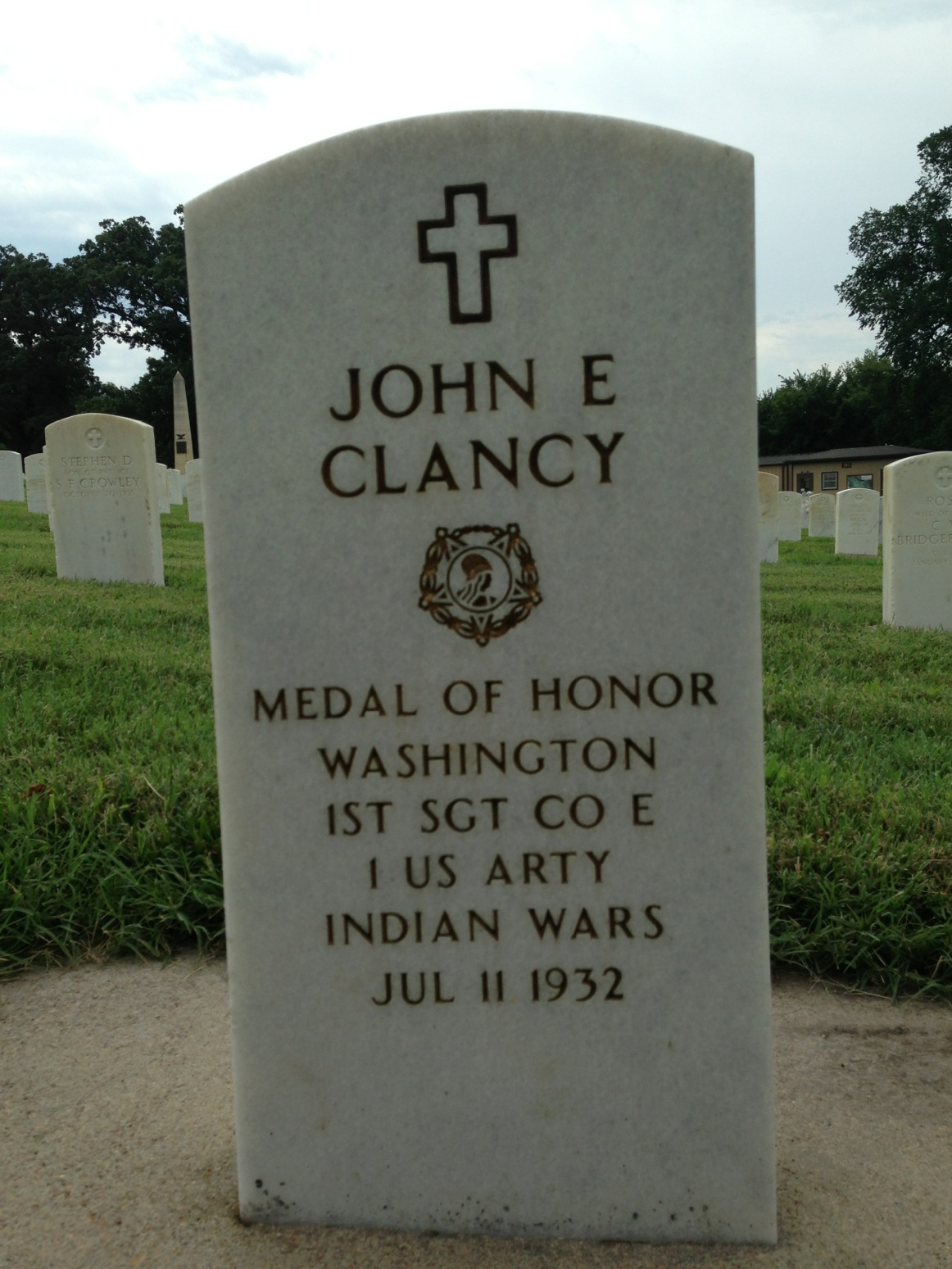
Gravestone at Fort Riley

John E. Clancy (c. 1868 – 1932) was an American soldier who served with the 1st Artillery Regiment. He was awarded the Medal of Honor for bravery at the Battle of Wounded Knee, now called the Wounded Knee Massacre.

== Service ==
Born in New York and raised in Washington, Clancy enlisted in Company E, 1st Artillery Regiment on August 2, 1887 (giving his age as 19) at "Vanco Bks" (possibly Vancouver Barracks).

=== Wounded Knee Massacre ===
On December 29, 1890, Clancy was present at the Wounded Knee Massacre and was cited for bravery in twice voluntarily rescuing wounded comrades from under enemy fire; he was later awarded the Medal of Honor for his actions.

=== Later service ===
He was discharged at Fort Sheridan, Illinois on August 1, 1892, as a private. Clancy re-enlisted in Company E on August 14, 1892, still at Fort Sheridan, and was dishonorably discharged at Fort Sheridan on September 26, 1894.

He died at Fort Riley, Kansas on July 11, 1932.

== Citation ==
December 29, 1890 Private (then musician) John Clancy, Battery E, 1st Artillery: For bravery in twice voluntarily rescuing wounded comrades from under fire of the enemy during action against hostile Sioux Indians at Wounded Knee Creek, South Dakota. (Medal of Honor)

== Controversy ==
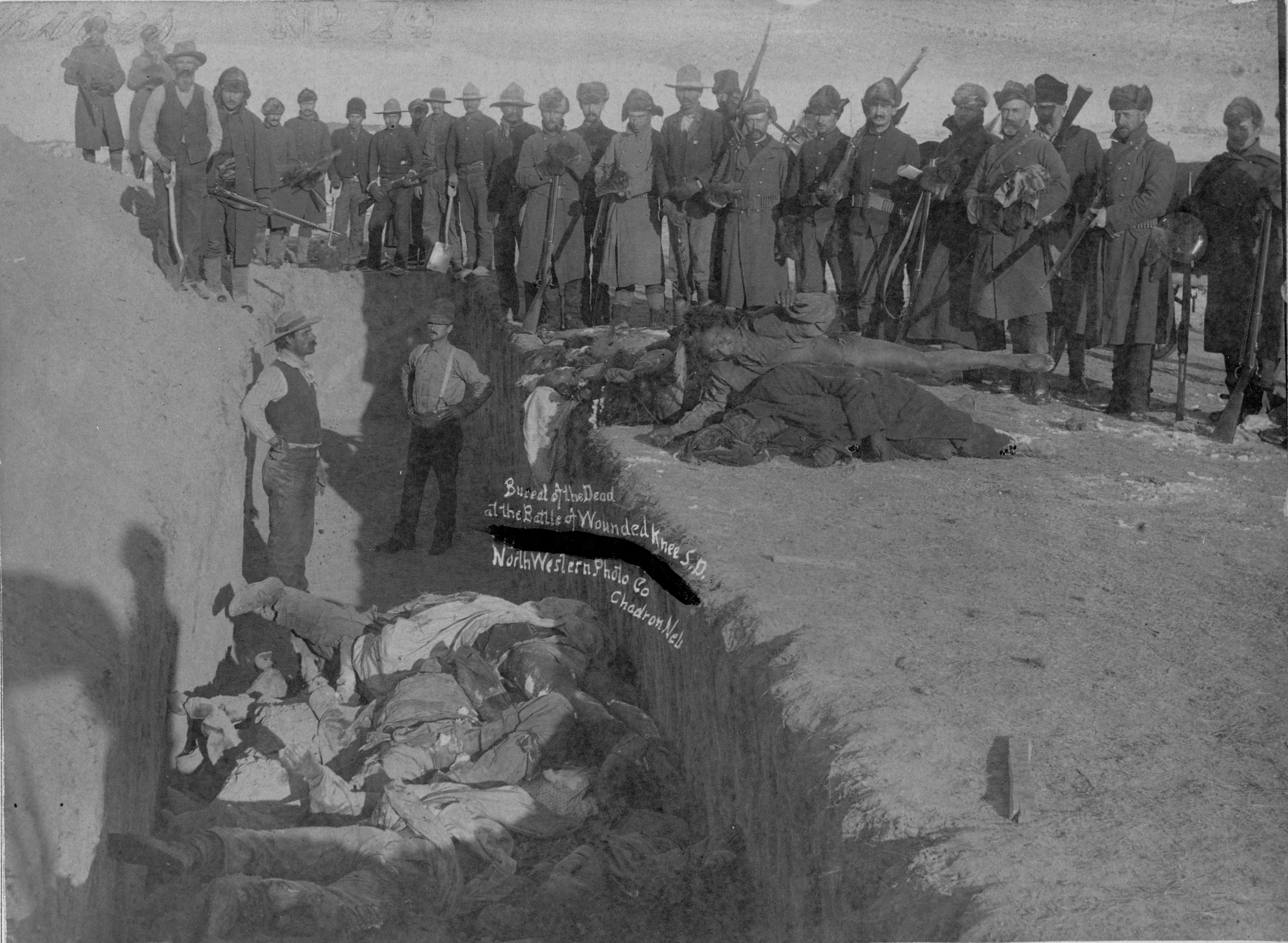
Mass Grave for the Dead Lakota After the Engagement at Wounded Knee

There have been several attempts by various parties to rescind the Medals of Honor awarded in connection with the Battle of Wounded Knee. Proponents claim that the engagement was in-fact a massacre and not a battle, due to the high number of killed and wounded Lakota women and children and the very one-sided casualty counts. Estimates of the Lakota losses indicate 150–300 killed, of which up to 200 were women and children. Additionally, as many as 51 were wounded. In contrast, the 7th Cavalry suffered 25 killed and 39 wounded, many being the result of friendly fire.

Calvin Spotted Elk, direct descendant of Chief Spotted Elk killed at Wounded Knee, launched a petition to rescind medals from the soldiers who participated in the battle.

The Army has also been criticized more generally for the seemingly disproportionate number of Medals of Honor awarded in connection with the battle. For comparison, 20 Medals were awarded at Wounded Knee, 21 at the Battle of Cedar Creek, and 20 at the Battle of Antietam. Respectively, Cedar Creek and Antietam involved 52,712 and 113,000 troops, suffering 8,674 and 22,717 casualties. Wounded Knee, however, involved 610 combatants and resulted in as many as 705 casualties (including non-combatants).
