= James Clancy =

James Clancy may refer to:

- James Clancy (politician) (1844–1921), Ontario farmer, businessman and political figure
- James M. Clancy, warden of Sing Sing prison
- James T. Clancy (1833–1870), Union Army soldier and Medal of Honor recipient

== See also ==
- Jim Clancy (disambiguation)
