= Clancy's =

Coordinates: 29.9190°N 90.1251°W

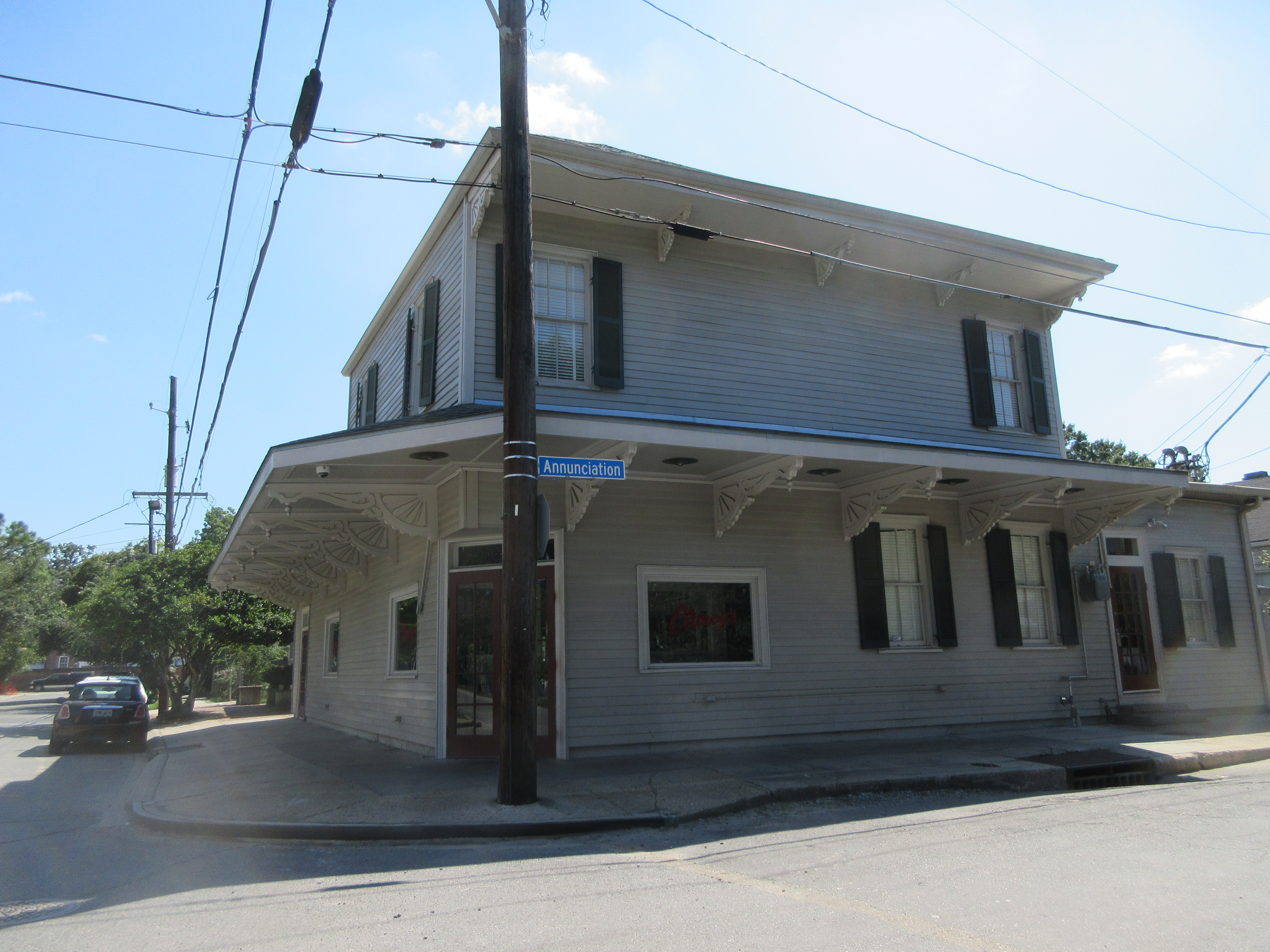
- Interactive map of Clancy's

Restaurant information
- Established: Late 1940s
- Owner: Brad Holingsworth
- Food type: Louisiana Creole cuisine
- Location: 6100 Annunciation Street, Uptown New Orleans, Louisiana, United States
- Reservations: Accepted
- Website: Clancyneworleans.com

Clancy's is a restaurant in New Orleans situated on 6100 Annunciation Street in the Uptown New Orleans district of New Orleans, Louisiana, near Audubon Park. It, like many of its New Orleans coevals, specializes in Louisiana Creole cuisine. Signature dishes include lemon ice box pie, fried oysters with brie (described in New Orleans Cuisine: Fourteen Signature Dishes and Their Histories as "irresistible"), smoked soft-shell crab, and smoked duck. Their oysters Rockefeller and Oysters Bedouin are also remarked upon.

== History ==
While the building has been occupied by bars and restaurants since early in the twentieth century, Clancy's itself was founded in the late 1940s by Ed and Betty Clancy. Its original incarnation was that of a po' boy restaurant and bar, the typical variety of the era. In 1983 the Clancy couple, themselves having borne no heir, sold the restaurant to a group of New Orleans businessmen led by Billy Slatten, Bryan Wagner, and the late judge, Marcel Livaudais. The restaurant was transformed into a fine dining, "white tablecloth"-style restaurant, eclipsing its humble beginnings. It was one of the original Louisiana Creole cuisine bistros that sprung up in the 1980s, now the pre-eminent restaurant style in New Orleans.

In 1987, Clancy's was acquired by longtime employee Brad Holingsworth, who has retained the restaurant's status, and has added an extensive wine cellar. In 2012 chef Steven Manning left to open his own restaurant in the Warehouse District. His role was taken over by Brian Larson, who already had twenty years experience in Clancy's.

== Awards and recognition ==
- Clancy's is listed in The Southern Foodie: 100 Places to Eat in the South Before You Die (and the Recipes That Made Them Famous)
