= T. Frank Clancy =

American politician and businessman

Thomas Frank Clancy (June 7, 1871 – November 18, 1936) was an American politician and businessman.

Born in Liberty Pole, Vernon County, Wisconsin, Clancy went to the public schools. He was in the well drilling business. Clancy was then involved in the harness and saddlery business. Clancy served as president and as treasurer of the village of Soldiers Grove, Wisconsin. He also served on the Soldier Grove village board. Clancy served on the school board and was president of the school board. In 1913, Clancy served in the Wisconsin State Assembly and was a Republican. Clancy also served on the Crawford County Board of Supervisors and the Crawford County Pension and Relief Committee. Clancy died at St. Francis Hospital in La Crosse, Wisconsin.
