= Joe Clancy =

American former football player (born 1990)

No. 14
- Position: Quarterback

Personal information
- Born: October 28, 1990 (age 36); Newburyport, Massachusetts, U.S.
- Listed height: 6 ft 2 in (1.88 m)
- Listed weight: 220 lb (100 kg)

Career information
- High school: Newburyport (MA)
- College: Merrimack
- NFL draft: 2014: undrafted

Career history
- Örebro Black Knights (2014); Blacktips (2014); San Jose SaberCats (2015)*; Los Angeles KISS (2015–2016)
- * Offseason or practice squad member only

Awards and highlights
- 2× First Team All-NE-10 (2012, 2013); 2× NE-10 Offensive Player of the Year (2012, 2013)

Career AFL statistics
- Comp. / Att.: 26 / 68
- Passing yards: 391
- TD–INT: 7–2
- QB rating: 71.38
- Rushing TD: 1
- Stats at ArenaFan.com

Joseph Clancy (born October 28, 1990) is an American former football quarterback. He played college football at Merrimack College.

== Early life ==
A three-sport letterman at Newburyport High School in Newburyport, Massachusetts, Clancy played football, basketball and baseball for the Clippers.

== College career ==
Clancy continued his football career at Merrimack College in North Andover, Massachusetts. Clancy redshirted his freshman year for the Warriors.

== Professional career ==
=== Örebro Black Knights ===
Clancy joined the Black Knights, in the Swedish Superserien, mid season after a season-ending injury to the successor at the position. Joe took the Black Knights to second place in the Swedish final game held at Tele2 Arena in Stockholm. He threw 10 touchdowns to 7 different receivers in his first game with the Black Knights.

=== Blacktips ===
In the fall of 2014, Clancy signed with the Blacktips of the Fall Experimental Football League (FXFL). He made his first start on October 25, 2014, against the Boston Brawlers. Clancy finished out the season with the Blacktips.

=== San Jose SaberCats ===
Clancy was assigned to the San Jose SaberCats of the Arena Football League (AFL) on February 5, 2015. He was placed on recallable reassignment on March 23, 2015.

=== Los Angeles KISS ===
On April 28, 2015, Clancy signed with the Los Angeles KISS. Clancy appeared in his first game with the KISS during their Week 6 game at the Las Vegas Outlaws. Clancy was 5-for-19 passing for 62 yards. On March 26, 2016, Clancy was placed on recallable reassignment.

== Coaching career ==
Clancy later became a quarterbacks coach and passing game coordinator for his alma mater, Merrimack College.
