= Joseph Clancy (politician) =

American businessman and politician

Martin Joseph Clancy, Sr. (August 2, 1890 – July 26, 1970) was an American businessman and politician. He was a member of the Wisconsin State Assembly from 1933 to 1935 and a member of the Wisconsin State Senate from 1935 to 1939.

Born in Racine, Wisconsin, Clancy graduated from Racine High School in 1908. He worked in construction on the Pacific coast and with the Chicago, Milwaukee and St. Paul Railroad. From 1914 to 1924, he worked as a general traffic manager for the rubber industry. Later, he was in the real estate and securities business. From 1933 to 1935, Clancy served in the Wisconsin State Assembly and was a Democrat. Then from 1935 to 1939, Clancy served in the Wisconsin State Senate. From 1941 to 1949, Clancy served as the executive secretary of the Wisconsin Coal Bureau. He was also the legislative counsel for the Milwaukee Transportation Company. Clancy died at his home in Racine, Wisconsin.
