= Seán Clancy =

Irish Army officer (1901–2006)

- Born: 7 July 1901
- Died: 17 September 2006 (aged 105) Dublin, Ireland
- Allegiance: Ireland
- Branch: Irish Republican Army
- Rank: Lieutenant colonel
- Conflicts: Irish War of Independence

Seán Clancy (7 July 1901 – 17 September 2006) was a veteran of the Irish War of Independence. Clancy served in the war as a member of Irish Republican Army, and later as a commander of the Fifth Infantry Battalion in the Irish Defence Forces. He was a lieutenant-colonel at the time of his death.

== Personal life ==
He grew up on a farm in the parish of Bridgetown in the town of Earl Hill, East Clare. He married Agnes Creagh, from Castlebar, in 1926, and they had five children. He was an enthusiastic GAA supporter and was one of the founding members of the Army Athletic Association, in 1923, where he captained teams and later went on to manage other teams.

He was invited by the GAA to see Clare win the All Ireland Hurling titles in 1995 and 1997. He had previously been there for their previous (loosing) final in 1932. He was also outside Croke Parke in 1914 when Clare won, but did not have the money for a ticket. The 81 year wait was something that weighed on him.

== Politics ==
Clancy was a prominent participant in the Dublin Castle ceremony in which Britain handed power to the new Irish government.

Clancy was a Fine Gael supporter throughout his life, he received visits from Liam Cosgrave, John Bruton and Enda Kenny, Garret Fitzgerald. He also was visited by Charlie Haughey as Clancy's previous OC had been Seanie Haughey (father of Charlie) and they had been close.

He died 17 September 2006, aged 105, after a short illness, at St Vincent's Hospital, Dublin. He is buried in Deans Grange Cemetery beside his wife.
