= Bill Clancy =

American baseball player (1879–1948)

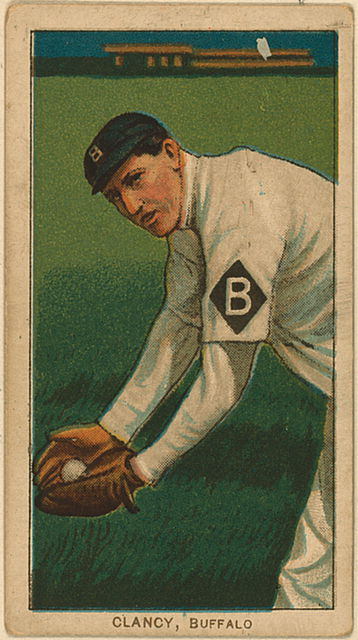
- First baseman
- Born: April 12, 1879; Redfield, New York, U.S.
- Died: February 10, 1948 (aged 68); Oriskany, New York, U.S.
- Batted: Left Threw: Right

MLB debut
- April 14, 1905, for the Pittsburgh Pirates

Last MLB appearance
- June 28, 1905, for the Pittsburgh Pirates

MLB statistics
- Batting average: .229
- Home runs: 2
- Runs batted in: 34
- Stats at Baseball Reference

Teams
- Pittsburgh Pirates (1905)

William Edward Clancy (April 12, 1879 – February 10, 1948) was an American first baseman in Major League Baseball. He played for the Pittsburgh Pirates in 1905. Though he played only one season in the Majors, he spent 11 seasons in the minors, including four with Rochester, and also managed in the minors. He was buried in Oneida County, northern NY, not far from where he was born in Oswego County, NY.
