= 1986 in baseball =

The following are the baseball events of the year 1986 throughout the world.

== Champions ==
=== Major League Baseball ===
- World Series: New York Mets over Boston Red Sox (4–3); Ray Knight, MVP

League Championship Series (ALCS, NLCS)
East	Boston	4
West	California	3
East	NY Mets	4
West	Houston	2

World Series
AL	Boston	3
NL	NY Mets	4

- American League Championship Series MVP: Marty Barrett
- National League Championship Series MVP: Mike Scott
- All-Star Game, July 15 at the Astrodome: American League, 3–2; Roger Clemens, MVP

=== Other champions ===
- Amateur World Series: Cuba
- Caribbean World Series: Águilas de Mexicali (Mexico)
- College World Series: Arizona
- Cuban National Series: Industriales
- Japan Series: Seibu Lions over Hiroshima Toyo Carp (4-3-1)
- Korean Series: Haitai Tigers over Samsung Lions
- Big League World Series: Maracaibo, Venezuela
- Junior League World Series: Waldorf, Maryland
- Little League World Series: Tainan Park, Taiwan
- Senior League World Series: Taipei, Taiwan

== Awards and honors ==
- Baseball Hall of Fame
  - Bobby Doerr
  - Ernie Lombardi
  - Willie McCovey
- Most Valuable Player
  - Roger Clemens, Boston Red Sox (AL)
  - Mike Schmidt, Philadelphia Phillies (NL)
- Cy Young Award
  - Roger Clemens, Boston Red Sox (AL)
  - Mike Scott, Houston Astros (NL)
- Rookie of the Year
  - Jose Canseco, Oakland Athletics (AL)
  - Todd Worrell, St. Louis Cardinals (NL)
- Rolaids Relief Man of the Year Award
  - Dave Righetti, New York Yankees (AL)
  - Todd Worrell, St. Louis Cardinals (NL)
- Manager of the Year Award
  - John McNamara, Boston Red Sox (AL)
  - Hal Lanier, Houston Astros (NL)
- Gold Glove Award
  - Don Mattingly (1B) (AL)
  - Frank White (2B) (AL)
  - Gary Gaetti (3B) (AL)
  - Tony Fernández (SS) (AL)
  - Kirby Puckett (OF) (AL)
  - Gary Pettis (OF) (AL)
  - Jesse Barfield (OF) (AL)
  - Bob Boone (C) (AL)
  - Ron Guidry (P) (AL)

== MLB statistical leaders ==
	American League		National League
Type	Name	Stat	Name	Stat
AVG	Wade Boggs BOS	.357	Tim Raines MON	.334
HR	Jesse Barfield TOR	40	Mike Schmidt PHI	37
RBI	Joe Carter CLE	121	Mike Schmidt PHI	119
Wins	Roger Clemens BOS	24	Fernando Valenzuela LAD	21
ERA	Roger Clemens BOS	2.48	Mike Scott HOU	2.22

== Major league baseball final standings ==
American League
Rank	Club	Wins	Losses	Win %	GB
East Division
1st	Boston Red Sox	95	66	.590	--
2nd	New York Yankees	90	72	.556	5.5
3rd	Detroit Tigers	87	75	.537	8.5
4th	Toronto Blue Jays	86	76	.531	9.5
5th	Cleveland Indians	84	78	.519	11.5
6th	Milwaukee Brewers	77	84	.478	18.0
7th	Baltimore Orioles	73	89	.451	22.5
West Division
1st	California Angels	92	70	.568	--
2nd	Texas Rangers	87	75	.537	5.0
3rd	Kansas City Royals	76	86	.469	16.0
3rd	Oakland Athletics	76	86	.469	16.0
5th	Chicago White Sox	72	90	.444	20.0
6th	Minnesota Twins	71	91	.438	21.0
7th	Seattle Mariners	67	95	.414	25.0

National League
Rank	Club	Wins	Losses	Win %	GB
East Division
1st	New York Mets	108	54	.667	--
2nd	Philadelphia Phillies	86	75	.534	21.5
3rd	St. Louis Cardinals	79	82	.491	28.5
4th	Montreal Expos	78	83	.484	29.5
5th	Chicago Cubs	70	90	.438	37.0
6th	Pittsburgh Pirates	64	98	.395	44.0
West Division
1st	Houston Astros	96	66	.593	--
2nd	Cincinnati Reds	86	76	.531	10.0
3rd	San Francisco Giants	83	79	.512	13.0
4th	San Diego Padres	74	88	.457	22.0
5th	Los Angeles Dodgers	73	89	.451	23.0
6th	Atlanta Braves	72	89	.447	23.5

== Events ==
=== January ===
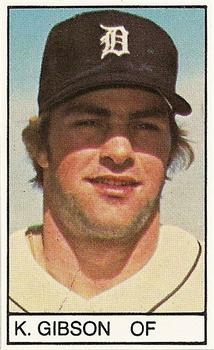
Kirk Gibson in 1983

- January 7
  - The Minnesota Twins and Cleveland Indians greet the new year with a four-pitcher trade. Minnesota receives left-hander Ramón Romero and right-hander Roy Smith from Cleveland in exchange for southpaw Bryan Oelkers (their top pick in the 1982 June amateur draft) and righty Ken Schrom, a former 15-game winner.
  - The sluggish 1985–1986 free-agent signing period continues under "Collusion I", a tacit agreement among MLB owners, inspired by Commissioner of Baseball Peter Ueberroth, to control player salaries and player movement by shunning the pursuit of other clubs' free agents.
    - Today, shortstop Dickie Thon agrees to return to the Houston Astros after being granted free-agency on November 12, 1985.
- January 8
  - Slugging first baseman Willie McCovey is the only player elected this year to the Baseball Hall of Fame by the Baseball Writers' Association of America, and becomes the 16th player elected in his first year of eligibility. Billy Williams falls four votes shy of the 319 needed for election.
  - Multiple marquee free agents sign contracts to return to their 1985 clubs after they fail to receive contract offers from competing teams under "Collusion I". All had been granted the freedom to "test the market" last November 12.
    - The most publicized free agent, outfielder Kirk Gibson, agrees to remain with the Detroit Tigers, signing a three-year deal worth $4 million total. Gibson, 28 and in the prime of his career, had been asking for a five-year, $8 million pact.
    - Future Hall-of-Fame catcher Carlton Fisk re-signs with the Chicago White Sox after New York Yankees owner George Steinbrenner reportedly rescinds his contract offer.
    - Ace relief pitcher Donnie Moore returns to the California Angels for 1986; he had led the 1985 Halos in saves and games pitched and made the AL All-Star team.
    - The Yankees retain three free agents—catcher Butch Wynegar and the Niekro brothers, pitchers Phil and Joe—from their September 1985 roster.
- January 14 – Over 50 players are selected during the final January edition of the 1986 MLB Amateur Draft, which is phased out in favor of a single, June lottery beginning in 1987. Noteworthy 1986 signees include Moisés Alou (Pittsburgh Pirates), Doug Brocail (San Diego Padres), Chris Hammond (Cincinnati Reds), Curt Schilling (Boston Red Sox), Jeff Shaw (Cleveland Indians), Jerome Walton (Chicago Cubs) and Mark Whiten (Toronto Blue Jays).
- January 16
  - The New York Mets acquire infielder Tim Teufel and minor-league outfielder Pat Crosby from the Minnesota Twins for pitchers Joe Klink and Bill Latham and outfielder Billy Beane, the future Oakland Athletics general manager and subject of Moneyball: The Art of Winning an Unfair Game.
  - The Twins make another deal, obtaining former touted Detroit Tigers infielder prospect Chris Pittaro and outfielder Alejandro Sánchez for catcher/outfielder Dave Engle.
- January 20
  - Designated hitter Dave Kingman re-signs with the Oakland Athletics after being unconditionally released by Oakland on December 20, 1985. In his 16th and final MLB season, Kingman, 37, will bash 35 home runs in 144 games in 1986.
  - Tony Pérez, granted free agency from the Cincinnati Reds last November 12, agrees to return to his longtime team for 1986. The 43-year-old future Hall of Famer will appear in 77 games, including 55 at first base, in his 23rd and last big-league campaign.
- January 28
  - Utilityman Juan Beníquez, 35, also one of the players granted free agency on November 12, changes teams, signing with the Baltimore Orioles after five productive seasons with the California Angels.
  - Veteran catcher Darrell Porter, 33, signs with the Texas Rangers; he had been released outright by the St. Louis Cardinals last November 14.
  - Dane Iorg, the Kansas City Royals' pinch hitter whose two-run single won Game 6 of the 1985 World Series, signs with the San Diego Padres. He had been granted free agency November 12.
- January 31
  - The Major League Baseball Players Association files a grievance with the independent arbitrator Thomas Roberts charging MLB owners with collusion and violating the current collective bargaining agreement by acting in concert to restrict free-agent player movement and salaries.
  - The Boston Red Sox sign veteran southpaw reliever Joe Sambito, unconditionally released by the New York Mets on August 23, 1985. The former NL All-Star, 33, still battling back from his 1982 "Tommy John surgery", will become a key piece of Boston's bullpen in 1986.

=== February ===
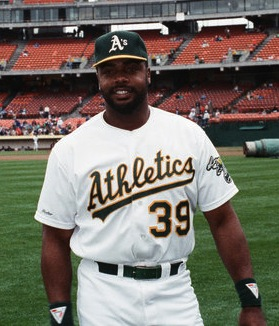
Dave Parker in 1989

- February 3 – The San Francisco Giants sign right-hander Mike LaCoss, released outright by the Kansas City Royals last November 6. LaCoss, 29, will spend six years with the Giants, win 47 games, and save six others.
- February 5 – Outfielder Jim Dwyer, granted free agency from the Baltimore Orioles last November 12, agrees to return for a sixth season as an Oriole.
- February 6 – The New York Yankees sign former California Angels reliever Al Holland, like Dwyer a member of the "Class of 1985" who were granted free agency last November 12.
- February 8 – The Cleveland Indians add free-agent Dickie Noles to their pitching staff. Noles, 29, had been released outright by the Texas Rangers last December 20.
- February 13
  - The New York Yankees and Chicago White Sox make a seven-player trade in which the Yankees re-acquire catcher Ron Hassey and outfielder Matt Winters, a former first-round amateur draft choice, in exchange for pitcher Neil Allen and catcher Scott Bradley. Three minor leaguers complete the transaction.
  - The Atlanta Braves sign right-hander David Palmer, granted free agency from the Montreal Expos last November 12.
- February 18
  - The Texas Rangers re-sign veteran minor-league relief pitcher Dale Mohorcic, granted six-year free agency October 15, 1985. As a 30-year-old rookie, Mohorcic will appear in 58 games for the Rangers in 1986 and pitch effectively, posting seven saves.
  - The Detroit Tigers sign corner infielder and pinch hitter Harry Spilman, granted free agency from the Houston Astros last November 12.
- February 24 – On opening day of spring training, Dick Williams, the manager who led the 1984 San Diego Padres to the first National League pennant in their 17-year history, quits his job after a winter of squabbles with Padres' president Ballard Smith and general manager Jack McKeon. Williams, 56, a future member of the Hall of Fame, compiled a 337–311 (.520) record in four seasons with San Diego. He will be replaced on February 26 by Steve Boros, who skippered the Oakland Athletics between Opening Day 1983 and May 24, 1984.
- February 27 – A natural-gas explosion rips through the Milwaukee Brewers' clubhouse at their new Chandler, Arizona, spring training facility, burning three Brewer coaches, Tony Muser, Larry Haney and Herm Starrette. Muser suffers the most severe burns and will miss the entire 1986 season while he recovers.
- February 28
  - Commissioner Peter Ueberroth announces the suspension of 11 players who had testified during or been implicated in the Pittsburgh drug trials of 1985. Seven—Joaquín Andújar, Dale Berra, Enos Cabell, Keith Hernandez, Jeffrey Leonard, Dave Parker and Lonnie Smith—are suspended for one year, and four for 60 days. However, Ueberroth also rules that the 11 players can avoid suspension by contributing ten percent of their 1986 salaries to anti-drug programs or facilities and up to 200 hours of community service in the next two years, and by participating in baseball-sanctioned anti-drug-use campaigns. All 11 will play "Organized Baseball" in 1986; Parker and Hernandez will make the NL All-Star team, with Hernandez also earning a World Series ring.
  - The Atlanta Braves sign outfielder Omar Moreno as a free agent; he had been unconditionally released by the Kansas City Royals last November 15.

=== March ===
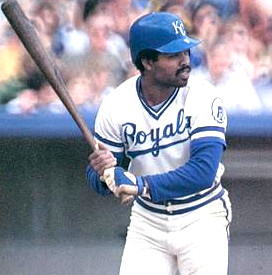
Hal McRae

- March 5 – The Braves acquire nine-time All-Star catcher and future Hall of Famer Ted Simmons, 36, from the Milwaukee Brewers for catcher Rick Cerone and two minor leaguers, pitcher Dave Clay and infielder Flavio Alfaro.
- March 10 – Ernie Lombardi, the National League MVP in 1938, and Bobby Doerr, a nine-time American League All-Star, are elected to the Hall of Fame by the Special Veterans Committee.
- March 13 – At spring training, the father-and-son team of Hal (age 40) and Brian McRae (18) appears together in an exhibition game for the Kansas City Royals. Brian, a first-round pick in the 1985 June amateur draft, will be optioned to the minor leagues before the start of this season and won't make his MLB debut until 1990. In 1991, Brian will play for his father, when Hal takes over as Royals' manager.
- March 28
  - In a rare trade between rivals, the Boston Red Sox send designated hitter Mike Easler to the New York Yankees in exchange for DH Don Baylor.
  - The Yankees also release future Hall-of-Fame hurler Phil Niekro; the knuckleball artist, who will turn 47 in four days, went 32–20 (3.59) in two seasons and 65 games for the Bombers. He'll sign with the Cleveland Indians on April 3 and win 11 games for them in 1986.
- March 30 – The Oakland Athletics acquire 11-year veteran starting pitcher Moose Haas from the Milwaukee Brewers for four players: catcher Charlie O'Brien, third baseman Steve Kiefer, and minor-league hurlers Mike Fulmer and Pete Kendrick.

=== April ===
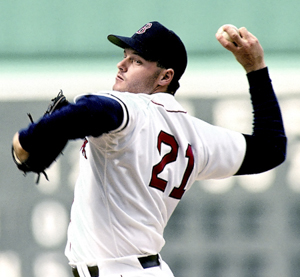
Roger Clemens

- April 1 – The Atlanta Braves unconditionally release four veteran pitchers: Len Barker, Rick Camp, Terry Forster and Pascual Pérez. The "April Fools' Day Massacre" is the largest one-day roster change in the club's 20 seasons in Georgia.
- April 3 – The San Diego Padres acquire outfielder Marvell Wynne from the Pittsburgh Pirates for left-handed pitcher Bob Patterson.
- April 4 – Syd Thrift, the Pirates' new general manager, makes another deal, sending former All-Star slugger Jason Thompson to the Montreal Expos for two minor-league players to be named later, infielder Ronnie Giddens and outfielder Ben Abner. Thompson, 31, is in his final MLB season.
- April 7
  - On Opening Day at Tiger Stadium, lead-off hitter Dwight Evans connects on the season's first pitch, delivered by future Hall of Famer Jack Morris, for a home run. Evans' blast is one of six hit in today's contest, and it helps his Boston Red Sox defeat the Detroit Tigers, 6–5. Kirk Gibson belts two homers for the Tigers.
  - At Riverfront Stadium, budding star Eric Davis slugs a three-run homer off Hall-of-Fame southpaw Steve Carlton to erase an early 3–1 deficit and lead his Cincinnati Reds to a 7–4 triumph over the Philadelphia Phillies.
  - A crowd of 52,292, the largest in Memorial Stadium regular-season history, goes home disappointed as the Cleveland Indians and winning pitcher Ken Schrom defeat the Baltimore Orioles and Mike Flanagan, 6–4.
- April 8
  - At Three Rivers Stadium, Dwight Gooden hurls a complete game and Keith Hernandez knocks in two runs to lead the New York Mets to a 4–2 victory over the Pittsburgh Pirates, the first triumph in a dominant season that will see the 1986 Mets capture the second World Series title in their 25-year history.
  - Before 55,602 at Yankee Stadium, Lou Piniella makes his managerial debut and guides his team to a 4–2 victory over the Kansas City Royals (for whom Piniella played from 1969–1973).
- April 12 – The Mets' pitching staff, which will ultimately rack up 108 victories and lead the National League in team ERA (3.11) this season, surrenders 14 bases on balls, along with 17 hits, in a 14-inning, 9–8 defeat at the hands of the Phillies at Veterans Stadium.
- April 16 – The California Angels sign southpaw relief pitcher Terry Forster, 34, unconditionally released by the Atlanta Braves on April 1.
- April 17 – In his second MLB start, rookie flamethrower Bobby Witt of the Texas Rangers pitches five hitless innings and strikes out ten—but allows eight bases on balls, four wild pitches, and two runs. He gets a "no-decision" in the Rangers' 7–5 victory over the Milwaukee Brewers at County Stadium.
- April 29
  - At Fenway Park, Boston Red Sox right-hander Roger Clemens strikes out 20 Seattle Mariners in nine innings—the first pitcher in major league history to do so; he walks none. Today's three-hit, 3–1 complete game victory improves his 1986 record to 4–0 (1.62). Clemens will equal his MLB-record 20 strikeout/zero walk achievement on September 18, 1996, at Tiger Stadium against Detroit.
  - Mario Soto of the Cincinnati Reds became the 11th pitcher in MLB annals to surrender four home runs in an inning in a 7–4 loss to the Montreal Expos. He's victimized by Andre Dawson, Hubie Brooks, Tim Wallach and Mike Fitzgerald.
- April 30 — San Diego Padres' left-hander Mark Thurmond throws the season's first one-hit game, defeating the St. Louis Cardinals, 5–0, at Jack Murphy Stadium. Willie McGee's seventh-inning single is the Redbirds' lone safety; Thurmond walks one and fans four. MLB hurlers will throw ten complete-game one-hitters in 1986.

=== May ===
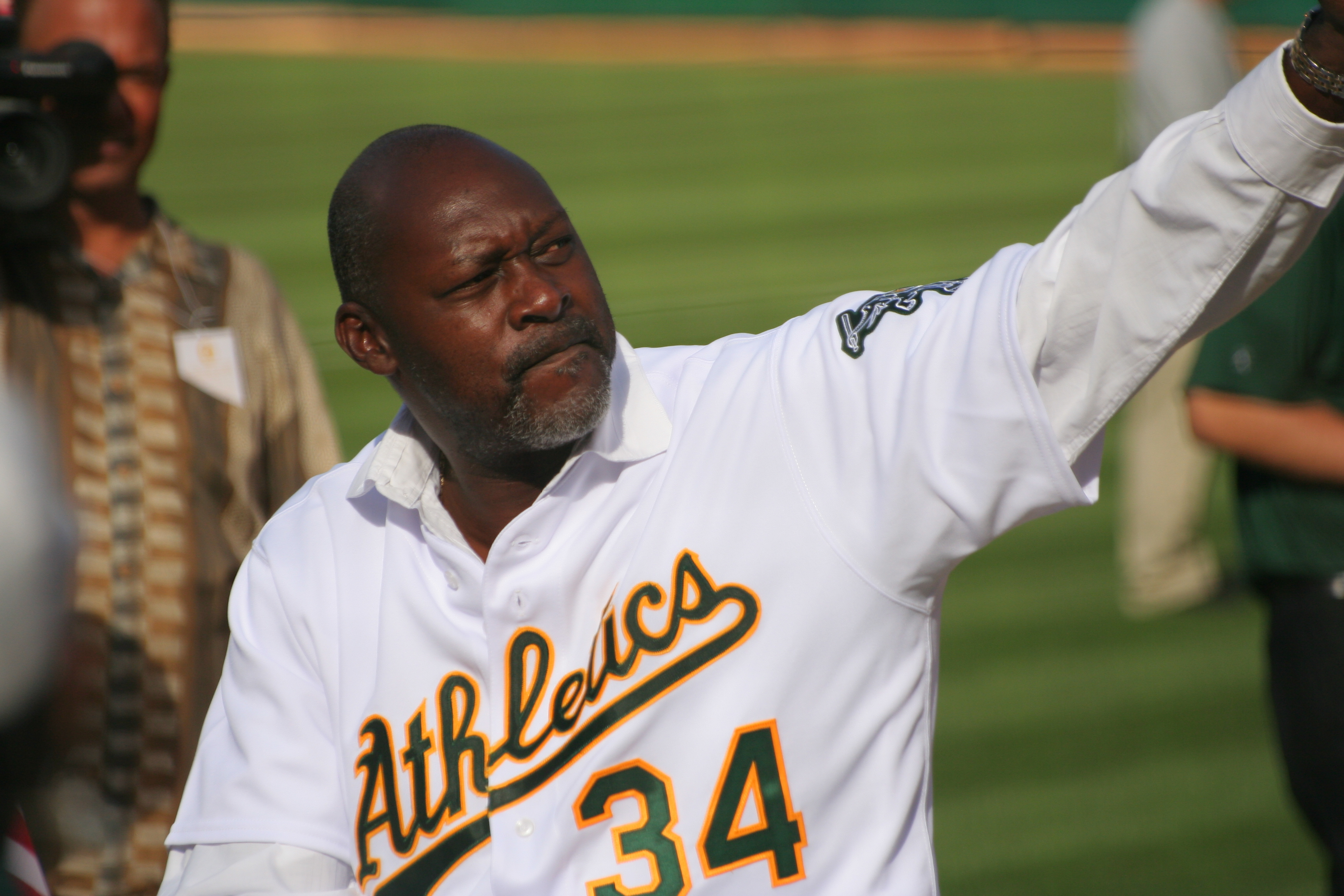
Dave Stewart in 2009

- May 1
  - The host Atlanta Braves (8–12) end the New York Mets' (13–4) club-record-tying 11-game winning streak, 7–2. Four different Braves hit home runs. Zane Smith throws a complete game. After today's setback, the Mets will reel off another seven victories in a row.
  - Vince Coleman of the St. Louis Cardinals ties an MLB record by hitting three sacrifice flies in a single game. Two days later, the New York Yankees' Don Mattingly does the same. Only three other players to date, including Ernie Banks, share the "sac fly" record.
- May 2
  - Twenty-year-old rookie Edwin Correa of the Texas Rangers shuts out the New York Yankees on three hits, 7–0, in the Bronx; Correa fans nine Bombers and issues five bases on balls. Earlier today, American League president Bobby Brown announces a two-game suspension for rookie Yankees' skipper Lou Piniella, effective May 5–6, for bumping umpire Tim Tschida during an argument on April 26. At 14–8, Piniella's Yankees hold first place in the AL East.
  - After an absence of more than three full seasons, free-agent lefty Tommy John, who will turn 43 in 20 days, begins his second term with the Yankees after being granted freedom from the Oakland Athletics on November 12, 1985. The former Bomber (1979–August 31, 1982) will give the Yanks 29 victories and 91 games pitched over the next three years and one month. His unusual odyssey affected by the MLB owners' ultimately ill-fated collusion policy, John will be granted free agency again in the mid-Novembers of 1986 and 1987, and be released outright in November 1988, but return to the Yankees three consecutive times until he retires for good at age 46 with 288 wins on May 30, 1989.
  - The Chicago Cubs sign first baseman Terry Francona as a free agent. The 27-year-old Francona had been released by the Montreal Expos on April 1.
- May 7 – Sweeping the defending World Series champion Kansas City Royals, the surprising Cleveland Indians win their tenth consecutive game, 7–1. Neal Heaton out-duels Cy Young Award-winner Bret Saberhagen. At 17–8, Cleveland is virtually tied with the Yankees for the divisional lead. The streaky Indians will lose nine of their next ten games and fall back to earth, but will enjoy a successful (84–78) 1986 season.
- May 8 – Losers of 16 of their last 20 games, the Seattle Mariners (9–19, seven games behind in the AL West) fire manager Chuck Cottier, who departs with a 98–119 (.452) record since taking the helm September 1, 1984. Coach Marty Martínez will serve as acting skipper tonight (a 4–2 loss to the Boston Red Sox at the Kingdome) before Hall-of-Fame manager Dick Williams takes over on Friday, May 9. For Williams, 57, Seattle will be the sixth and final stop of his two-decade-long managerial career; he had resigned from the San Diego Padres in late February.
- May 14 – The Boston Red Sox climb into a first-place tie with the New York Yankees with their 13th win in their last 17 games, an 8–5, come-from-behind triumph over the California Angels at Anaheim Stadium. Roger Clemens improves to 6–0. The Red Sox are in the midst of a 21–7 month of May that puts them in control of the AL East race.
- May 16
  - Tony Phillips of the Oakland Athletics hits for the cycle in an 8–4 triumph over the Baltimore Orioles at Memorial Stadium, going five-for-five with four runs batted in.
  - The Houston Astros sign relief pitcher Larry Andersen, released three days earlier by the Philadelphia Phillies. The 33-year-old righty will become a key contributor to the Astro bullpen into the 1990 season.
- May 23 – The Oakland Athletics sign right-hander Dave Stewart, who had been unconditionally released two weeks earlier by the Phillies. Stewart, 29, will rebound from disappointing 1984–1985 seasons (7–20, 4.95 in 78 games pitched)—to win nine of 14 decisions for Oakland in 1986, then post four seasons in a row of 20+ victories between 1987 and 1990.
- May 25 – The Pittsburgh Pirates recall top prospect Barry Bonds from Triple-A Hawaii, but a roster technicality in Pittsburgh will delay the 21-year-old outfielder's debut until Friday, May 30. Uncharacteristically, Bonds will go hitless in five at bats in his first MLB game, a ten-inning, 6–4 loss to the Los Angeles Dodgers at Three Rivers Stadium.

=== June ===
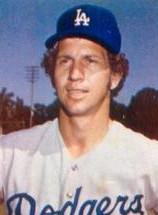
Don Sutton

- June 2 – The Milwaukee Brewers draft 17-year-old shortstop Gary Sheffield from Tampa's Hillsborough High School with their top pick, sixth overall, in the June amateur draft. Sheffield is the nephew of Mets' phenom Dwight Gooden. The San Francisco Giants, picking third overall, select shortstop and future third baseman Matt Williams from the University of Nevada, Las Vegas.
- June 4 – Pitching at Atlanta–Fulton County Stadium, Atlanta Braves pitcher Craig McMurtry gives up Barry Bonds' first major league career home run.
- June 5 – Cesar Cedeño is released by the Los Angeles Dodgers, ending Cedeño's MLB playing career.
- June 9 – An eventful ten days for each of Chicago's MLB franchises begins on a relatively quiet note when Ken Harrelson, the White Sox' chief of baseball operations, brings in former MLB catcher and San Francisco Giants executive Tom Haller as general manager. The self-assured Harrelson, a novice front office boss, is making wholesale changes in the White Sox' organization, replacing longtime senior staff like Roland Hemond and Dave Dombrowski with ex-major leaguers like Alvin Dark and, now, Haller, who is promoted to GM after managing Double-A Birmingham.
- June 11 – After a unanimous vote by the circuit's owners, A. Bartlett Giamatti becomes the 12th president of the 110-year-old National League, succeeding the retiring Chub Feeney. Giamatti, 48, is the president of Yale University and a professor of Renaissance literature who has been a passionate baseball fan since he was a boy.
- June 12
  - Jim Frey, who led the 1984 Chicago Cubs to their first postseason appearance in 39 years, is fired as the club's manager; third base coach Don Zimmer, a longtime friend of Frey's, also is released. Frey's 1984 Cubbies went 96–65 and captured the NL East title before a heart-breaking "come-from-ahead" loss in the NLCS; they've posted a poor 100–117 record since. After coach John Vukovich handles the Cubs today, Gene Michael, 48, former manager of the New York Yankees and now a coach for the Bombers, will be Frey's permanent successor.
  - The San Diego Padres obtain outfielder/second baseman Randy Ready from the Milwaukee Brewers for a "PTBNL" (first baseman Tim Pyznarski).
- June 13 – Los Angeles Dodgers pitcher Fernando Valenzuela and catcher Alex Treviño form the first Mexican battery in MLB history.
- June 16
  - The Montreal Expos acquire pitcher Dennis Martínez from the Baltimore Orioles in a deal that includes two players to be named later; it will be finalized when the Orioles send catcher John Stefero to Montreal and the Expos send infielder Rene Gonzales to Baltimore. Nicknamed El Presidenté, Martínez, 32, will win 100 games and make three NL All-Star teams in eight seasons as an Expo.
  - Jamie Moyer makes his major league debut, earning a win in the Cubs' 7-5 victory over the Philadelphia Phillies. Moyer's career will last 25 seasons, and he'll appear in his final game in 2012.
- June 18 – California Angels pitcher and future Hall of Famer Don Sutton, 41, hurls a complete-game, 5–1 victory against the Texas Rangers for his 300th career win.
- June 19 – The Chicago White Sox fire manager Tony La Russa and pitching coach Dave Duncan. La Russa, 41, has compiled a record of 522–510, including the 1983 AL West championship, since his hiring on August 3, 1979, but the ChiSox are only 26–38 this season. Baseball operations boss Ken Harrelson says that "the overall standings and the performance of the club" caused him to sack the future member of the Hall of Fame. "We're not talking about a personality conflict."
  - Harrelson names Jim Fregosi, 44, former manager of the California Angels, as La Russa's permanent successor on June 22.
- June 20 – The Cleveland Indians trade left-hander Neal Heaton to the Minnesota Twins for righty John Butcher.
- June 21 – In a move that shocks many, reigning Heisman Trophy winner Vincent "Bo" Jackson of Auburn University announces that he will spurn the Tampa Bay Buccaneers, who had made him the first overall selection of the 1986 National Football League Draft, and signs a contract to play baseball with the Kansas City Royals, who had taken him in the fourth round (105th overall) in June 2's MLB amateur draft.
- June 24 – The Philadelphia Phillies unconditionally release future Hall-of-Fame left-hander Steve Carlton, who has won 241 games and four NL Cy Young Awards with them since April 1972. So far this season, Carlton, 41, is only 4–8 (6.18) in 16 starts.
- June 26 – The Oakland Athletics (29–44, 11 games from first in the AL West) fire manager Jackie Moore and elevate bullpen coach Jeff Newman to stopgap pilot while they search for a permanent replacement.
- June 27
  - Roger Clemens of the Boston Red Sox improves to 14–0 on the season, defeating the Baltimore Orioles, 5–3, at Memorial Stadium; he fans 11 hitters in eight innings of work. He will fall short of the American League record of 15–0 to start a season, held by Dave McNally and Johnny Allen, when he's thwarted by Jimmy Key of the Toronto Blue Jays on July 2 at Fenway Park for his first setback of 1986.
  - Robby Thompson of the San Francisco Giants is caught stealing four times (including being picked off) in his club's 7–6, 12-inning win over the host Cincinnati Reds. The young second baseman, who'll be the runner-up in the NL's Rookie of the Year balloting for 1986, isn't able to successfully swipe a bag in the contest.
- June 29 – A third future Hall-of-Fame moundsman makes headlines in June when the first-place Boston Red Sox acquire Tom Seaver from the Chicago White Sox in exchange for infielder Steve Lyons. Seaver, 41, is 2–6 (4.38) in 12 starts for Chicago, and has been seeking a trade to be closer to his Connecticut home.
- June 30 – The New York Mets send pitcher Ed Lynch to the Chicago Cubs for catcher Dave Liddell and minor-league pitcher Dave Lenderman.

=== July ===
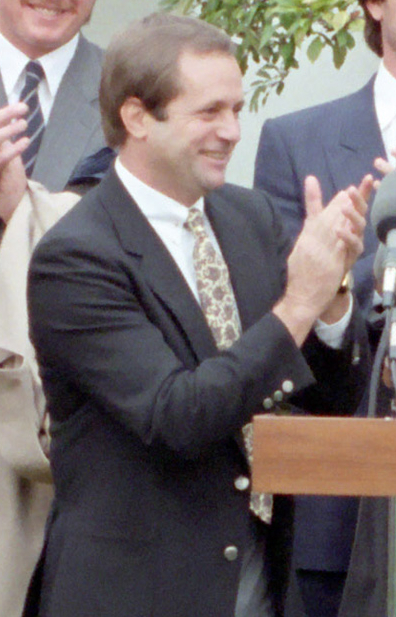
Dick Howser at the White House (1985)

- July 1 – The Chicago White Sox obtain outfielder Iván Calderón, 24, from the Seattle Mariners to complete a June 26 trade in which Seattle acquired catcher Scott Bradley. Calderón will hit 70 homers between 1987 and 1990 as Chicago's starting right fielder.
- July 3 – Tony La Russa's jobless status lasts less than two weeks when he's hired to manage the Oakland Athletics, signing a three-year contract. La Russa immediately appoints Dave Duncan Oakland's pitching coach. The Athletics are 30–50, last in the AL West.
- July 4 – All-time great southpaw Steve Carlton, released by the Philadelphia Phillies on June 24, signs a free-agent contract with the San Francisco Giants.
- July 6
  - First baseman Bob Horner of the Atlanta Braves becomes the 11th player in major league history to hit four home runs in one game. Horner joins Ed Delahanty as the second player to do so in a losing effort, as his Braves fall to the Montreal Expos, 11–8, at Fulton County Stadium.
  - Bobby Cox, the first-year general manager of the Braves, acquires two pitchers in a pair of trades with his former team, the Toronto Blue Jays. In one deal, Cox obtains veteran starting pitcher Doyle Alexander for 22-year-old rookie reliever Duane Ward; in the other, Atlanta gets Jim Acker, a reliever, from Toronto for Joe Johnson, a starter. Both teams will benefit: Ward becomes a cornerstone of the Blue Jay bullpen, and Cox will trade Alexander in 1987 to obtain future Hall of Famer John Smoltz.
- July 9 – "Trader Jack" McKeon, GM of the San Diego Padres, lives up to his nickname, making two transactions. In one, he reacquires starter Ed Whitson from the New York Yankees for reliever Tim Stoddard; in the other, he obtains pitcher Dave LaPoint from the Detroit Tigers for fellow lefty Mark Thurmond. Whitson, who helped pitch the 1984 Padres to a pennant, has struggled in the Bronx, but he'll return to form with San Diego in 1987 as a reliable member of their rotation.
- July 10 – Furious over being bypassed for a spot on the American League All-Star team, right-hander Oil Can Boyd of the Boston Red Sox—whose 11 wins are second-most in the AL—flies into a clubhouse rage and leaves the team. He won't appear again for the Red Sox until August 8, four weeks later, after a three-day suspension, an incident with local police, a brief hospital stay, and newspaper reports detailing his personal financial problems. He'll win five more games during the regular season, and start and win Game 6 of the 1986 ALCS—an elimination game that keeps the Bosox alive in their series against the California Angels.
- July 13 – As the All-Star break begins, the half-way point of the 1986 season sees close races in the western divisions of each major league. In the NL West, the surprising San Francisco Giants (48–40) lead the Houston Astros (47–41) by a game. In the AL West, the California Angels (48–39) hold a 1½-game edge over the Texas Rangers (47–41). Meanwhile, the eastern leaders enjoy more substantial margins over their rivals: the New York Mets (59–25) lead the NL East by 13 games, and the Red Sox (56–31) top the AL East by seven lengths.
- July 15
  - At the Astrodome, the American League wins the 1986 All-Star Game 3–2, for its second Midsummer Classic triumph since 1972. AL starter Roger Clemens, who grew up in Houston, fires three perfect innings to win the game and its MVP Award. Lou Whitaker and Frank White hit home runs.
  - The Junior Circuit's triumph is tinged with tragedy when it proves to be the last game ever managed by Dick Howser, pilot of the defending World Series champion Kansas City Royals. Plagued by intermittent memory lapses and headaches in the weeks before the game, Howser, 50, will be admitted to Saint Luke's Hospital of Kansas City on July 17; five days later, he undergoes surgery that reveals a malignant brain tumor. Mike Ferraro becomes the Royals' acting manager for the remainder of 1986.
- July 22 – Bench-clearing brawls erupt in two National League games.
  - At Riverfront Stadium, New York Mets third baseman Ray Knight incites a melee against his former team, the Cincinnati Reds. Eric Davis, pinch-running for Pete Rose in the tenth inning, steals second and third base. Knight takes the throw from Mets catcher Gary Carter late, brings his glove to Davis's face and knocks his helmet off. A stare-down ensues, followed by a right cross from Knight, and the benches empty. Three Mets (Knight, Kevin Mitchell, Darryl Strawberry) and two Reds (Davis, Mario Soto) are thrown out of the game.
    - As result of the ejections, Mets manager Davey Johnson brings back-up catcher Ed Hearn into the game, and moves Carter to third. Righty Roger McDowell replaces southpaw Jesse Orosco on the mound, and Orosco moves to right field. The pitchers trade positions with two outs in the 11th, and McDowell also swaps positions with left fielder Mookie Wilson with one out in the 12th. This rotation continues for the rest of the game, which the Mets win in the 14th, 6–3, on a home run by shortstop Howard Johnson.
  - At Busch Memorial Stadium, the San Francisco Giants become incensed when, in the fifth inning, Vince Coleman swipes second and third base with the St. Louis Cardinals holding a 10–2 lead. When he bats again, in the seventh, Coleman is knocked down, then hit by a pitch, and benches clear. Managers Roger Craig and Whitey Herzog nearly come to blows. The two are ejected, along with the Giants' Chris Brown. The Cardinals win the game, 10–7.
- July 23 – The Pittsburgh Pirates reacquire Bobby Bonilla from the Chicago White Sox for pitcher José DeLeón. The rookie outfielder, 23, had been discovered by Pirates' general manager Syd Thrift, then a scout, while a teenaged Bonilla was playing summer amateur baseball in Scandinavia. The White Sox had selected Bonilla from Pittsburgh in the 1985 Rule 5 draft; he made the 1986 ChiSox and is hitting .269 in 75 games when today's trade is made. As a Pirate, he'll be an NL All-Star for four consecutive seasons and win three Silver Slugger Awards through 1991.
- July 29 – Sparky Anderson of the Detroit Tigers becomes the first in baseball to achieve 600 career wins as a manager in both the American and National League.
- July 30 – The New York Yankees acquire right-handed slugger Ron Kittle, catcher Joel Skinner and infielder Wayne Tolleson from the White Sox for catchers Ron Hassey and Bill Lindsey (PTBNL) and third baseman Carlos Martínez. The Yankees stand four games behind the Boston Red Sox in the AL East race.

=== August ===
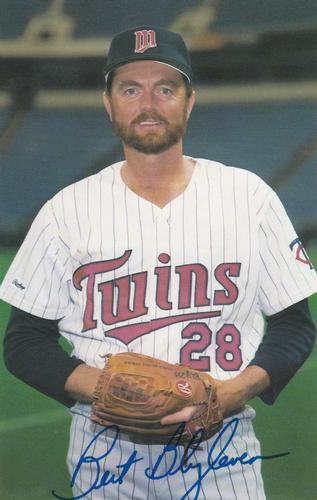
Bert Blyleven

- August 1 – Bert Blyleven of the Minnesota Twins records his 3,000th career strikeout; it comes against Mike Davis of the Oakland Athletics in a 10–1 victory at Metrodome. In the same game, his teammate Kirby Puckett hits for the cycle for the only time in his career.
- August 3 – Lee Mazzilli, one of the stars of the drab late-1970s New York Mets, returns to the team as a free agent after his July 23 release from the Pittsburgh Pirates. Now 31, he's primarily a pinch hitter and backup outfielder, but he'll score a key run in Game 7 of the upcoming World Series.
- August 5
  - At Candlestick Park, San Francisco Giants southpaw Steve Carlton strikes out Eric Davis in the third inning of a game against the Cincinnati Reds. As a result, Carlton accomplished another pitching milestone in his illustrious career, while becoming just the second major league pitcher, after Nolan Ryan, to reach the 4,000 strikeouts mark.
  - Rookie Jim Traber and sophomore Larry Sheets hit consecutive home runs that cap a five-run third inning, and Storm Davis continues his mastery over the Texas Rangers, as the Baltimore Orioles breeze to a 9–2 victory. The win brings the 59–47 Orioles to within 2½ games of the first-place Boston Red Sox. The game proves to be the 1986 Orioles' high-water mark; they collapse completely to lose 42 of their final 56 games and mar Earl Weaver's final swan song by finishing 73–89, the Hall-of-Fame manager's only losing season.
- August 8 – Recalled after a rehabilitation assignment in the Florida State League, 43-year-old lefty Tommy John throttles the visiting Kansas City Royals for 72/3 innings and his New York Yankees earn a 2–0 victory. Willie Randolph's first-inning homer stands up as the game-winning hit. To make room for John, the Yankees release relief pitcher Al Holland.
- August 10
  - The Detroit Tigers trade pitching prospect Ken Hill, currently 20 years old and pitching in Low A ball, and a PTBNL (first baseman Mike Laga) to the St. Louis Cardinals for catcher Mike Heath. Detroit also unconditionally releases catcher Dave Engle.
  - The New York Yankees retire Billy Martin's uniform #1. The digit has also been worn by distinguished Yankees such as Earle Combs, George Selkirk, Frank Crosetti, Snuffy Stirnweiss, Bobby Richardson and Bobby Murcer, but it has come to be identified with the scrappy "Billy the Kid."
- August 11 – Cincinnati Reds player–manager Pete Rose, 45, notches the tenth five-hit game of his 24-year playing career, a new National League record. He singles four times and doubles once, driving in three runs in a 13–4 loss to the San Francisco Giants.
- August 12
  - Don Baylor of the Boston Red Sox sets an AL record when he's hit by a pitch for the 25th time that season, breaking the record he shared with Bill Freehan (1968) and Norm Elberfeld (1911); he's plunked by Kansas City's Bud Black, as the Royals complete a doubleheader sweep with a 6–5 victory.
  - The Chicago White Sox sign free agent Steve Carlton, released by the San Francisco Giants on August 7. Carlton departs the National League with 319 career victories.
- August 13 – The Minnesota Twins acquire pitchers George Frazier and Ray Fontenot and minor-league infielder Julius McDougal from the Chicago Cubs for hurlers Ron Davis and Dewayne Coleman.
- August 14 – The Cincinnati Reds' Pete Rose enjoys a three-for-four day; the last safety is Rose's final and 4,256th hit of his career—an MLB record.
- August 15
  - The Houston Astros, 66–50 and holding a five-game lead in the NL West, obtain right-hander Danny Darwin from the Milwaukee Brewers for pitchers Don August and Mark Knudson. Darwin, 30, will pitch effectively down the stretch (5–2, 2.32 in 12 games) to help Houston seal the division title.
  - The Chicago White Sox sign free-agent 37-year-old former slugger George Foster, released August 7 by the New York Mets after hitting 13 homers in limited duty this season.
- August 17
  - Pete Rose, who inserts himself into the Cincinnati lineup as a pinch hitter, takes a called third strike from San Diego Padres pitcher Goose Gossage, ending a 9–5 loss. The "K" marks Rose's final career plate appearance (15,890), at-bat (14,503), and game (3,562)—all of which are Major League career records; Rose will continue his managerial duties for the Reds into 1989.
  - In a trade that will benefit the AL East-leading Boston Red Sox this postseason, they send shortstop Rey Quiñones, cash, and three players to be named later (pitchers Mike Brown and Mike Trujillo and outfielder John Christensen) to the Seattle Mariners for outfielder Dave Henderson and shortstop Spike Owen.
- August 20 – Two no-hit bids are broken up in the ninth inning.
  - Against the San Francisco Giants at Candlestick Park, Philadelphia Phillies pitcher Don Carman has a perfect game broken up by a Bob Brenly double leading off the final regulation frame. The Phillies win 1–0 in ten innings on a Juan Samuel home run; Steve Bedrosian relieves Carman in the bottom of the tenth and retires the Giants in order.
  - Against the California Angels at Tiger Stadium, Walt Terrell of the Detroit Tigers has his no-hit bid foiled with two outs by a Wally Joyner double, the only safety he will allow in a 3–0 victory. It's the second time this season that Joyner has broken up a no-hit bid in the ninth inning; against the Texas Rangers on June 16, he had foiled Charlie Hough's attempt with one out in the ninth.
- August 21 – In their 24–5 thrashing of the host Cleveland Indians today, the visiting Boston Red Sox set 1986 MLB team highs in hits (24), runs scored, and runs batted in (23). The game marks the debut of Cleveland rookie southpaw Greg Swindell, the #2 overall pick in the June amateur draft; Boston chases him in the fourth inning, then scores an even dozen runs in the sixth against Dickie Noles, José Román and Bryan Oelkers. Newly acquired shortstop Spike Owen scores six runs for the Bosox, most by a big-leaguer in a single game this season.

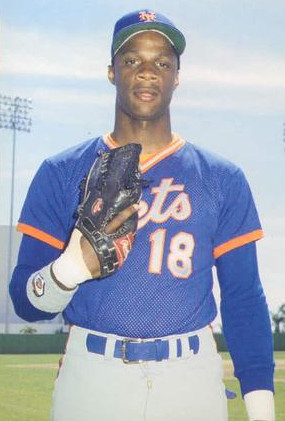
Darryl Strawberry

- August 27 – Darryl Strawberry hits his 100th career home run helping the New York Mets beat the San Diego Padres 6–5.
- August 29 – A game between the Montreal Expos and San Diego Padres is postponed after two 200-pound oxygen cylinders explode inside the unfinished Olympic Stadium tower.

=== September ===
- September 1 – The American League boasts the closest pennant races on Labor Day evening: the Boston Red Sox (77–54) are 3½ games ahead of the Toronto Blue Jays (74–58) in the East, and the California Angels (74–57) lead the surprising Texas Rangers (69–63) by 5½ lengths in the West. In the National League, the runaway New York Mets (88–43) and the Houston Astros (74–57) enjoy margins of 19 and seven full games respectively.
- September 3 – In the majors' longest game of 1986, Billy Hatcher homers in the top of the 18th inning to give the Houston Astros an 8–7 victory over the Chicago Cubs. The two teams had played 14 innings a day earlier before the contest was suspended, and use a major league record 53 players in the game.
- September 5 – Claude Brochu, an executive with the Seagram multinational beverage company with no baseball background, is named to succeed John McHale as president and chief operating officer of the Montreal Expos. McHale, who has held the club presidency since it entered the National League in August 1968, remains with the Expos as deputy chairman and CEO.
- September 6
  - Joe Carter of the Cleveland Indians collects five hits in a game for the third time in 1986 in a 17–9 victory over the Milwaukee Brewers at County Stadium—Carter's second five-hit game in nine days. In the three contests, he goes 15-for-16 (.938) and scores nine runs; of the 15 safeties, five are homers and four are doubles; he knocks in 12. Carter will lead the American League with 121 runs batted in, and bat .302 with 200 hits.
  - After having hit a record 210 career home runs without hitting a grand slam, Bob Horner of the Atlanta Braves finally connects for one in the third inning in a 4-2 win over the Pittsburgh Pirates.
- September 12
  - The 59–80 Minnesota Twins fire second-year manager Ray Miller and appoint third-base coach Tom Kelly interim skipper. Kelly, 36, will gain the Twins' permanent managerial post on November 24 and lead them to two (1987, 1991) World Series championships through 2001.
  - American League president Bobby Brown suspends the Texas Rangers' Bobby Valentine for four games following the manager's heated dispute with umpire Larry Barnett over ball-and-strike calls on September 11.
- September 14
  - Bo Jackson slugs his first major league home run—a 475-foot blast believed to be the longest to date at Royals Stadium—leading the Kansas City Royals to a 10–3 victory over the Seattle Mariners.
  - San Francisco Giants third baseman Bob Brenly, usually a catcher, ties a major league record by making four errors in just one inning. He then redeems himself later by hitting two home runs, including the game-winner, as San Francisco beats the Atlanta Braves, 7–6.
- September 17 – The New York Mets secure their third National League East title since 1969 with a 4–2 win over the visiting Chicago Cubs for their 95th victory of the season.
- September 19 – As the regular season's days dwindle, Joe Cowley of the Chicago White Sox hurls the majors' first no-hitter, defeating the California Angels, 7–1 at Anaheim Stadium. Cowley fans eight, but issues seven bases on balls, and the Angels' run scores in the sixth when Cowley walks the bases loaded and Reggie Jackson hits a sacrifice fly.
- September 21 – Future Hall-of-Fame manager Earl Weaver, who has announced his pending retirement, is ejected for the 97th and final time of his 17-year MLB career. Umpire Al Clark does the honors after a cap-throwing, dirt-kicking Weaver disputes a catcher's interference call in the 11th inning of the Baltimore Orioles' 5–4 loss to the Milwaukee Brewers.
- September 22 – Fernando Valenzuela of the Los Angeles Dodgers becomes the first Mexican pitcher to enjoy a 20-win season in the majors, beating the Houston Astros, 9–2, while allowing just two hits. Four days later, Teddy Higuera of the Brewers becomes the American League's first, Mexico-born 20-game-winner.
- September 25
  - Clinching the Houston Astros' NL West title in spectacular fashion, pitching ace Mike Scott hurls a 2–0 no-hitter against the San Francisco Giants at the Houston Astrodome. Scott walks two and fans 13. The Astros' second division title (after 1980's) sets up a championship series with the Mets, whose franchise entered the National League with Houston's as expansion teams in 1962.
  - George Bamberger retires from the 71–81 Milwaukee Brewers, and third-base coach Tom Trebelhorn replaces him as interim skipper. Bamberger, 63, closes the book on his 41-year career as a pitcher, pitching coach and manager. Trebelhorn, 38, a former minor-league catcher, will be given the Brewers' reins on a permanent basis on October 2 after leading them to six wins in nine games for the rest of this season.
- September 26
  - The California Angels' 8–3 win against the host Texas Rangers gives the Angels their third American League West crown.
  - Admitting he "made some mistakes that hurt the organization's perception and credibility with fans," Ken Harrelson resigns after less than a full calendar year as the Chicago White Sox' executive vice president, baseball operations. Harrelson, 45, will resume his broadcasting career in 1987. After a spell working on the New York Yankees' TV crew, he will return to the White Sox in 1990 as the popular lead announcer on game telecasts through 2015.
- September 28 – The Boston Red Sox claim the American League East championship with a 12–3 drubbing of the Toronto Blue Jays at Fenway Park. Oil Can Boyd throws a complete game for his 16th win and Marty Barrett drives in four runs.

=== October ===
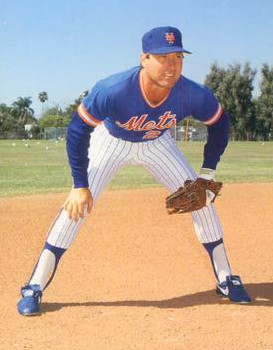
World Series MVP Ray Knight

- October 2 – The Kansas City Royals claim outfielder Jim Eisenreich on waivers from the Minnesota Twins. The highly talented, 27-year-old Eisenreich has missed the 1985 and 1986 seasons recovering from Tourette Syndrome. He will resume his playing career in 1987 by batting .382 in 70 games at Double-A Memphis, and will play almost 1,400 MLB games until his final appearance on September 26, 1998.
- October 4 – At the Hubert H. Humphrey Metrodome, Greg Gagne of the Twins hits two inside-the-park home runs in a 7–3 victory over the Chicago White Sox. In the same game, Bert Blyleven—who goes the distance for the victory—allows his 50th homer of the season (to Daryl Boston) to set a major league record. Coincidentally, Blyleven had given up Dick Allen's two inside-the-park homers in a July 31, 1972 game against the White Sox, the last game prior to today's in which one player hits a pair of inside-the-park blows. That game had been played in the Metrodome's predecessor, Metropolitan Stadium.
- October 5 – On the regular season's final day, the New York Mets beat the Pittsburgh Pirates, 9–0 at Shea Stadium, for their 108th win of the year. The 1986 Mets set franchise records for wins, home wins (55), road wins (53), home runs (148), batting average (.263) and attendance (2,762,417), all for a team that this year is celebrating its 25th anniversary.
- October 6 – Cal Ripken Sr., the widely rumored successor to Earl Weaver as manager of the Baltimore Orioles, is officially appointed the club's 1987 pilot. A career member of the Baltimore organization, and the father of the Orioles' superstar and future Hall of Famer, Ripken, 50, has been the team's third-base coach since late June 1977. Weaver retired for good after yesterday's season finale with a career mark of 1,480–1,060 (.583), four AL pennants and one World Series title.
- October 10 – Clyde King, general manager of the New York Yankees since April 10, 1984, is replaced by former MLB infielder Woody Woodward. King, 62, remains with the Bombers as a special assistant to George Steinbrenner. Woodward, 44, had been the Yanks' vice president, baseball administration. Field manager Lou Piniella, meanwhile, is invited to return for 1987.
- October 12 – In Game 5 of the American League Championship Series, the Boston Red Sox, trailing three games to one to the California Angels and two outs away from elimination, are rescued when Don Baylor delivers a two-run home run off Mike Witt to trim the Angel lead from 5–2 to 5–4. After Witt retires Dwight Evans for the second out, Gary Lucas relieves him and promptly hits Rich Gedman with his first (and only) pitch. Donnie Moore then relieves Lucas and, with one strike away from elimination, Dave Henderson crushes a pitch from Moore into the left-field stands for a 6–5 lead. The Red Sox win, 7–6 in 11 innings (a Henderson sacrifice fly providing the winning run), and extend the series to a sixth game.
- October 14 – At Shea Stadium, Dwight Gooden and Nolan Ryan hook up in a scintillating pitchers' duel in Game 5 of the National League Championship Series with the host New York Mets and Houston Astros tied, two games apiece. Houston loses a potential lead run in the second on a disputed out call at first base; each team scores in the fifth, New York on Darryl Strawberry's homer; Ryan goes nine innings and fans 12 before leaving for a pinch hitter in the visitors' tenth; Gooden works ten innings before leaving in a double-switch. But the game remains knotted 1–1 until the Mets' 12th, when future Hall of Famer Gary Carter singles home Wally Backman with the winning run, to give New York a one-game series edge.
- October 15
  - In the longest game in post-season history (until the 2005 National League Division Series), the visiting Mets defeat the Astros, 7–6 in 16 innings, in Game 6 of the NLCS to earn their first trip to the World Series since 1973, four games to two. New York scores three runs in the top of the ninth to force extra innings, then each team scores a run in the 14th to preserve the deadlock. In the top of the 16th, the Mets tally three more runs, then Houston answers with two of its own before Jesse Orosco fans Kevin Bass to end the game. It's the Mets third NL pennant.
  - At Fenway Park, the Red Sox rout the Angels, 8–1, in Game 7 of the ALCS to complete their comeback from trailing three games to one. Boston wins its tenth-ever AL pennant, and first since 1975.
- October 25 – Leading 5–3 in Game 6 of the World Series, and just one out away from winning their first championship since 1918, the Red Sox surrender singles to Gary Carter, Kevin Mitchell and Ray Knight, and pitcher Bob Stanley throws a wild pitch that allows Mitchell to tie the game. Then Mookie Wilson's slow grounder bounces between the legs of first baseman Bill Buckner, allowing Knight to score to give the New York Mets an improbable 6–5 win. Boston's Calvin Schiraldi absorbs the loss.
- October 27 – At Shea Stadium, the Mets come from behind again, overcoming a three-run Boston lead with six unanswered runs in the sixth and seventh innings and winning Game 7 of the World Series over the Red Sox by a final of 8–5. The Mets capture their second Fall Classic championship and first since 1969. Third baseman Ray Knight, whose homer broke a 3–3 deadlock in the seventh, is chosen Series MVP.
- October 28 – Larry Bowa becomes the tenth manager in the San Diego Padres' 18-year history, replacing Steve Boros. Bowa, 40, the fiery former five-time NL All-Star shortstop, had retired from the playing ranks in 1985 and managed Triple-A Las Vegas to an 80–62 record in 1986. Boros' term in San Diego lasts only one full season after taking over the Padres upon Dick Williams' sudden resignation in February.
- October 29 – The Chicago White Sox make a course correction in their front office, naming Larry Himes, 46, vice president and general manager, and accepting the resignation of GM Tom Haller, a left-over from the failed Ken Harrelson experiment. Harrelson, who quit as the ChiSox' baseball operations czar September 26 after less than a year in the job, had purged veteran baseball people from the club's management team and major-league staff, and replaced most of them with retired MLB players with "presence" but limited executive resumés. A former minor-league catcher, Himes has an extensive scouting and player development background, and for the past six years has headed the California Angels' efforts in those areas.
- October 30 – The Baltimore Orioles trade 24-year-old right-handed starter Storm Davis to the San Diego Padres for reliever Mark Williamson and catcher Terry Kennedy.

=== November ===
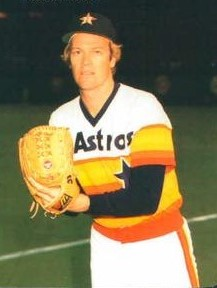
Mike Scott

- November 5 – Hal Lanier, who guided the Houston Astros to the National League West Division in his first season as manager is named the Senior Circuit's Manager of the Year by the BBWAA. The Boston Red Sox' John McNamara takes home the same honor in the American League.
- November 11 – The Astros' Mike Scott (98 points, 15 first-place votes) nips Fernando Valenzuela (88, nine) to win the 1986 NL Cy Young Award. Scott led his circuit in bWAR (8.2), earned run average (2.22), innings pitched (2751/3), and strikeouts (306).
- November 12
  - Seventy-seven players are granted free agency under the terms of the existing collective bargaining agreement between MLB owners and the Major League Baseball Players Association—but the competitive bidding process remains almost nonexistent under the shadow of collusion. For a second consecutive off-season, owners are charged with working in unison "to reduce salaries and length of contractual commitments across the board."
    - Between October 5 and the end of this month, 129 players will become free agents. Today's class includes athletes in the midst of All-Star careers—Doyle Alexander, André Dawson, Bob Horner, Ray Knight, Dennis Martínez, Jack Morris, Lance Parrish, Tim Raines, and others. Dawson, Morris and Raines are future Hall of Famers.
    - The MLBPA will file a second grievance, alleging what will be known as "Collusion II," in February 1987; the union shows that, of top eight free agents, only Dawson will receive a bona fide offer from a team other than his own, the Expos, to whom Dawson refuses to return. Another, Parrish, will be courted by the Philadelphia Phillies, who initially insist that he sign away his right to sue MLB owners as part of the deal. Horner will abandon "Organized Baseball" completely and sign a contract to play in Japan.
  - Roger Clemens wins the American League Cy Young Award unanimously, joining Denny McLain (1968) as the only pitchers to do so. Clemens (28 first-place votes, 140 points) finished with a 24–4 record with 238 strikeouts; his 24 victories and 2.48 ERA led the Junior Circuit. On November 18, Clemens will collect another major honor, the 1986 AL MVP Award; his 339 points and 19 first-place votes enable him to outpace Don Mattingly (258, five) and Jim Rice (241, four).
  - The Los Angeles Dodgers release former starting shortstop Bill Russell, 38, who played 18 seasons and 2,181 regular-season games and made three NL All-Star teams, all as a Dodger. He'll join Tom Lasorda's coaching staff in 1987 and eventually succeed Lasorda as manager in June 1996.
- November 19 – Philadelphia Phillies third baseman Mike Schmidt wins the National League MVP Award, joining Stan Musial and Roy Campanella as the only three-time NL winners. Schmidt led his league with 37 home runs and 119 RBI while hitting a .290 average. Schmidt earns 287 points and 15 of 24 first-place votes, while Glenn Davis is the runner-up (231, six).
- November 24 – St. Louis Cardinals reliever Todd Worrell, who led the National League with 36 saves, receives Rookie of the Year honors. Worrell had helped St. Louis to the 1985 World Series as a late-season call-up but was still a rookie in 1986, as defined by the BBWAA.
- November 25 – Jose Canseco of the Oakland Athletics, who hit .240 with 33 home runs and 117 RBI, wins the American League Rookie of the Year Award with 16 of 28 first place votes, with the others going to Wally Joyner of the California Angels (.290, 22, 100). Canseco also becomes the first Athletics franchise player to win the award since pitcher Harry Byrd in 1952. Canseco's .240 batting average is the lowest ever for a Rookie of the Year position player.
- November 26 – The New York Yankees and Pittsburgh Pirates work out a six-pitcher, interleague trade in which the Yankees send Doug Drabek, Logan Easley and Brian Fisher to Pittsburgh for Pat Clements, Cecilio Guante and Rick Rhoden. Drabek, 24, will win 22 games and the NL Cy Young Award as a Pirate in 1990.

=== December ===
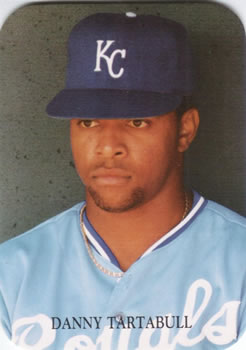
Danny Tartabull

- December 5 – Kansas City Royals manager Dick Howser undergoes surgery for a second time in 4½ months in an attempt to remove a cancerous brain tumor. Howser, 50, went on emergency medical leave hours after leading the American League to victory in the 1986 MLB All-Star Game; he hopes to return to the Royals' helm when spring training begins in February 1987.
- December 7 – Free agent outfielder Claudell Washington, a member of the Collusion II class empowered to "test the market" November 12, returns to the New York Yankees on a two-year contract for a reported $480,000 annually. His 1987 salary reflects a 36 percent pay cut from his 1986 earnings.
- December 9 – At the annual winter meetings, held this year in Hollywood, Florida, American and National league owners approve the sale of two clubs.
  - Brothers and real-estate developers Richard E. and David H. Jacobs acquire the Cleveland Indians from the estate of late trucking magnate F. J. "Steve" O'Neill for a reported $33 million. Under the Jacobses' leadership, the franchise will move into a new stadium and, after years of struggle, become an American League power during the mid-1990s.
  - As Doubleday & Company is being sold to Bertelsmann, ownership of the world-champion New York Mets is transferred to individual investors and equal partners Nelson Doubleday Jr., former chairman of the venerable U.S. publishing house, and Fred Wilpon, who had held five percent of the team. The estimated purchase price of between $80.75 and $100 million is the highest ever paid for a U.S. sports franchise.
- December 10
  - Adding pitching depth, the Los Angeles Dodgers make two deals. In one, they trade left-hander Dennis Powell and minor-league infielder Mike Watters to the Seattle Mariners for southpaw Matt Young. They also send first baseman Greg Brock to the Milwaukee Brewers for hurlers Tim Crews and Tim Leary.
  - The Mariners are also active today, making a second transaction. This one, within their division, transfers slugging outfielder Danny Tartabull and right-hander Rick Luecken to the Kansas City Royals for pitchers Scott Bankhead and Steve Shields and outfielder Mike Kingery.
- December 11
  - In an eight-player (and "four-Kevin") trade, the world champion New York Mets acquire outfielder Kevin McReynolds, along with left-hander Gene Walter and minor-league infielder Adam Ging, for hard-hitting outfielder/third baseman Kevin Mitchell, outfielder Stan Jefferson, infielder Shawn Abner, and minor-league pitchers Kevin Armstrong and Kevin Brown. McReynolds, 27, will be the Mets' starting left-fielder for the next five seasons; Mitchell, 24, will play only 62 games with San Diego before he's dealt to the San Francisco Giants, where he will blossom into an MVP.
  - The Oakland Athletics obtain relief pitcher Gene Nelson and southpaw Bruce Tanner (PTBNL) from the Chicago White Sox for second baseman Donnie Hill.
  - The New York Yankees trade infielder Tom Barrett and outfielder/DH Mike Easler to the Philadelphia Phillies for pitcher Charles Hudson.
- December 16 – San Diego Padres pitcher LaMarr Hoyt is sentenced to 45 days in jail following his third arrest on drug possession charges, this time on the U.S.-Mexico border. Baseball Commissioner Peter Ueberroth will bar Hoyt from baseball on February 25, 1987.
- December 19
  - Jack Morris, the premier free agent pitcher on the "open" market since November 12, reluctantly returns to the Detroit Tigers for a tenth season after the New York Yankees' George Steinbrenner withdraws his one-year contract offer, citing payroll uncertainty. Morris, a future (2018) Hall of Famer, blames collusion. "...[Owners] are putting pressure on me to go back to Detroit," the pitcher says at a news conference. "I don't know where it's coming from, but all of them got the word. Someone is telling them to lay off."
  - The Yankees deal catcher Butch Wynegar to the California Angels for pitcher Ron Romanick and a player to be named later; right-hander Alan Mills, 20, is sent to New York in June 1987 to complete the transaction.
- December 20 – Despite his 29 home runs (with 85 RBI) in 1986, the Tigers unconditionally release 39-year-old third baseman Darrell Evans. When no other MLB team shows interest in his services, Evans will re-sign with Detroit for a 33 percent pay cut in February 1987—then smash 34 homers for the 1987 Tigers.
- December 26 – Future Hall of Famer Reggie Jackson, granted free agency from the California Angels on November 12, returns to his original organization, the Athletics, for whom the 40-year-old slugger played from 1967 through 1975 and where he earned three World Series rings. He'll play one final season in Oakland, appear in 115 games, and hit 15 home runs.

== Births ==
=== January ===
- January 1 – Nick Hagadone
- January 5 – J. P. Arencibia
- January 8 – James Russell
- January 16 – Reid Brignac
- January 16 – Mark Trumbo
- January 20 – David Lough
- January 24 – Andy Dirks
- January 24 – Tyler Flowers
- January 24 – Franklin Morales
- January 27 – Yohan Flande
- January 28 – Brandon Guyer
- January 28 – Nate Jones
- January 29 – Jair Jurrjens
- January 30 – Nick Evans
- January 30 – Jordan Pacheco
- January 30 – Mark Rogers

=== February ===
- February 1 – Kristopher Negron
- February 1 – Justin Sellers
- February 3 – Lucas Duda
- February 4 – Jordan Smith
- February 5 – Ryan Webb
- February 6 – Kanekoa Texeira
- February 7 – Josh Collmenter
- February 8 – Matt Bush
- February 9 – Josh Judy
- February 10 – Dalier Hinojosa
- February 10 – Duke Welker
- February 12 – Brandon Allen
- February 12 – Todd Frazier
- February 15 – Johnny Cueto
- February 15 – Fautino de los Santos
- February 19 – Michael Schwimer
- February 20 – Julio Borbon
- February 26 – Erik Cordier
- February 27 – Yovani Gallardo
- February 27 – James Parr

=== March ===
- March 3 – Eric Farris
- March 6 – Jake Arrieta
- March 6 – Francisco Cervelli
- March 6 – Ross Detwiler
- March 11 – Jeremy Hefner
- March 12 – Joey Butler
- March 16 – Mickey Storey
- March 17 – Chris Davis
- March 21 – Carlos Monasterios
- March 22 – Dexter Fowler
- March 27 – Johnny Monell
- March 28 – Brad Emaus
- March 28 – Steve Susdorf
- March 30 – Barry Enright

=== April ===
- April 4 – Louis Coleman
- April 5 – Steve Clevenger
- April 7 – Chia-Jen Lo
- April 8 – Félix Hernández
- April 8 – Eddie Kunz
- April 8 – Carlos Santana
- April 9 – Bryan Petersen
- April 10 – Corey Kluber
- April 11 – Russ Canzler
- April 11 – Charlie Furbush
- April 12 – Brad Brach
- April 13 – Lorenzo Cain
- April 14 – Cory Gearrin
- April 18 – Billy Butler
- April 20 – Donovan Hand
- April 20 – Jess Todd
- April 23 – Luis Durango
- April 24 – Aaron Cunningham
- April 28 – Dillon Gee
- April 28 – Daniel Moskos

=== May ===
- May 3 – Homer Bailey
- May 6 – Matt Langwell
- May 9 – Daniel Schlereth
- May 10 – Luke Putkonen
- May 10 – Matt Tuiasosopo
- May 13 – John Ely
- May 14 – Efren Navarro
- May 14 – Jackson Williams
- May 15 – Brandon Barnes
- May 19 – Joe Paterson
- May 21 – Matt Wieters
- May 22 – Collin Cowgill
- May 22 – Eric Sogard
- May 23 – Jordan Zimmermann
- May 30 – Tony Campana

=== June ===
- June 2 – Chris Martin
- June 3 – Zach Lutz
- June 6 – Collin Balester
- June 6 – Junichi Tazawa
- June 8 – Ángel Salomé
- June 10 – Al Alburquerque
- June 13 – Jonathan Lucroy
- June 15 – Trevor Plouffe
- June 15 – Sean West
- June 17 – Quinn Wolcott
- June 18 – Steve Cishek
- June 18 – Caleb Joseph
- June 24 – Phil Hughes
- June 25 – Bobby LaFromboise
- June 26 – Michael Kohn
- June 26 – Lou Marson
- June 29 – Tom Koehler
- June 30 – Mike Carp

=== July ===
- July 1 – Charles Blackmon
- July 2 – Brett Cecil
- July 2 – Oliver Marmol
- July 2 – Rene Tosoni
- July 3 – Tommy Hunter
- July 8 – Jaime García
- July 10 – Byung-ho Park
- July 11 – Bryan Augenstein
- July 12 – Nick Vincent
- July 23 – Andrew Carignan
- July 24 – Scott Van Slyke
- July 24 – Miguel Socolovich
- July 26 – Elih Villanueva
- July 27 – Ryan Flaherty
- July 28 – Darin Ruf
- July 30 – Scott Diamond

=== August ===
- August 4 – Alex Castellanos
- August 6 – Jake McGee
- August 7 – Jordan Danks
- August 11 – Colby Rasmus
- August 11 – Pablo Sandoval
- August 16 – Yu Darvish
- August 16 – Martín Maldonado
- August 18 – Tony Cruz
- August 18 – Evan Gattis
- August 18 – Andrew Taylor
- August 19 – Austin Adams
- August 21 – Erik Hamren
- August 24 – Nick Adenhart
- August 26 – Xavier Cedeño
- August 26 – Luis Marte
- August 26 – Brett Wallace
- August 27 – Jordy Mercer
- August 28 – Tommy Hanson
- August 31 – Juan Nicasio

=== September ===
- September 1 – Brian Broderick
- September 2 – Evan Crawford
- September 3 – Brandon Beachy
- September 4 – Jordan Schafer
- September 4 – Michael Stutes
- September 8 – Logan Schafer
- September 9 – Michael Bowden
- September 11 – Kyle Blanks
- September 11 – Andrew Cashner
- September 11 – Pat Hoberg
- September 12 – Steve Garrison
- September 12 – Kyle Weiland
- September 16 – Gordon Beckham
- September 18 – Michael Kirkman
- September 19 – Manabu Mima
- September 19 – Anthony Vasquez
- September 20 – A. J. Ramos
- September 21 – Zach Phillips
- September 22 – Arcenio León
- September 22 – Chris Schwinden
- September 23 – Miguel González
- September 23 – Chris Volstad
- September 26 – Sean Doolittle
- September 27 – Vin Mazzaro
- September 27 – Matt Shoemaker
- September 28 – Zach Stewart
- September 30 – James Hoyt
- September 30 – Edward Paredes

=== October ===
- October 1 – Aaron Poreda
- October 4 – Stephen Fife
- October 5 – Jeff Bianchi
- October 5 – Tanner Roark
- October 6 – Edgmer Escalona
- October 8 – Adron Chambers
- October 8 – Erik Davis
- October 9 – Derek Holland
- October 9 – David Phelps
- October 9 – Chaz Roe
- October 10 – Andrew McCutchen
- October 12 – Trevor Bell
- October 17 – Dan Butler
- October 19 – Daniel Descalso
- October 21 – C. C. Lee
- October 22 – Justin Freeman
- October 22 – Chris Rusin
- October 27 – Pedro Beato
- October 27 – Jon Niese
- October 28 – Josh Thole
- October 30 – Desmond Jennings

=== November ===
- November 1 – Rhiner Cruz
- November 2 – Taylor Green
- November 3 – Alex Wilson
- November 10 – Aaron Crow
- November 10 – Eric Thames
- November 13 – Josh Bell
- November 13 – Wade Miley
- November 13 – Juan Pérez
- November 13 – Bryan Price
- November 17 – Everth Cabrera
- November 19 – Michael Saunders
- November 20 – Alex Guerrero
- November 22 – Chris Dominguez
- November 23 – Brandon Snyder
- November 24 – Dean Anna

=== December ===
- December 1 – A. J. Morris
- December 5 – Tim Kennelly
- December 5 – Justin Smoak
- December 6 – Ryan Tucker
- December 8 – Jordan Norberto
- December 10 – Matt Clark
- December 10 – Pedro Florimón
- December 15 – Nick Buss
- December 16 – Bryan Anderson
- December 16 – Alcides Escobar
- December 16 – Ryan Lollis
- December 17 – Josh Edgin
- December 18 – Chris Carter
- December 25 – Waldis Joaquin
- December 31 – Nate Freiman

== Deaths ==
=== January ===
- January 1 – Bill Hall, 57, backup catcher who played for the Pittsburgh Pirates over part of three seasons spanning 1954–1958.
- January 2
  - Bob Finley, 70, catcher for the Philadelphia Phillies during the 1943 and 1944 seasons.
  - Bill Veeck, 71, principal owner of the Cleveland Indians (1946–1949), St. Louis Browns (1951–1953) and Chicago White Sox (1959–1961 and 1976–1980); broke the American League's color barrier by signing Larry Doby in 1947 and brought Cleveland its second-ever World Series title in 1948; perhaps best remembered for the wacky promotions he used to draw crowds and entertain fans at the ballpark, which included using midget Eddie Gaedel in a 1951 Browns game, and installing fireworks in the Comiskey Park scoreboard; elected to Baseball Hall of Fame in 1991.
- January 3 – Chico Hernández, 70, Cuban backup catcher who played from 1942 to 1943 for the Chicago Cubs.
- January 4 – Dave Morey, 96, a five-sport star at Dartmouth College and Major League Baseball pitcher for the Philadelphia Athletics in 1913, who later became a prominent coach of football and baseball at the Lowell Technological Institute, Middlebury College, Auburn University, Fordham University and Bates College in the period between 1916 and 1939.
- January 7 – Joe Burns, 85, catcher who played eight games for the 1924 Chicago White Sox.
- January 10 – Roy Johnson, 90, pitcher in ten games for 1918 Philadelphia Athletics who became a minor league manager; longtime employee of the Chicago Cubs as a coach (1935–1939, 1944–1953) and scout; interim manager of Cubs for one game (May 3, 1944).
- January 11 – Grover Resinger, 70, minor-league player and manager who was an MLB coach for the Atlanta Braves, Chicago White Sox, Detroit Tigers and California Angels for all or part of seven seasons between 1966 and 1976.
- January 12 – Eddie Solomon, 34, trustworthy relief pitcher who played for the Los Angeles Dodgers, Chicago Cubs, St. Louis Cardinals, Atlanta Braves, Pittsburgh Pirates and Chicago White Sox over ten seasons spanning 1973–1982.
- January 13 – Mike Garcia, 62, three-time All-Star pitcher who played for three teams in 14 seasons from 1948 to 1961, mostly with the Cleveland Indians in a span of 12 years, winning 142 games for the Indians, including 20 or more wins and leading the American League in earned run average twice each, being also a member of their storied 'Big Four' pitching rotation in its 1954 season, along with Bob Feller, Bob Lemon and Early Wynn, as they started 147 of the 156 games of the team, while posting a collective record of 93–36 and 2.85 ERA, guiding the Indians to the World Series for the first time in six years and the third in 34 years.
- January 15 – Fred Thomas, 93, third baseman for three American League clubs from 1918 to 1920, who was also a member of the 1918 World Series Champion Red Sox and a World War I veteran.
- January 24 – John Boozer, 47, pitcher for the Philadelphia Phillies over seven seasons between 1962 and 1969, who has the distinction of being one of only four Major League Baseball pitchers to be ejected from a game for violation of the spitball rule.
- January 28 – Tom Grubbs, 91, pitcher who played for the New York Giants in its 1920 season.

=== February ===
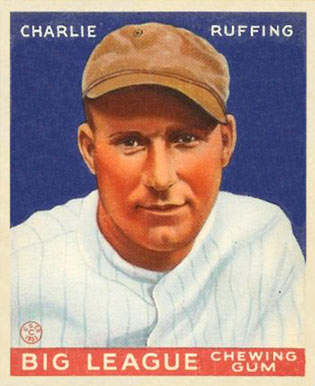
Red Ruffing Goudey Card

- February 13 – Ed McGhee, 61, fourth outfielder who played with the Chicago White Sox, Philadelphia Athletics and Chicago White Sox over part of four seasons spanning 1950–1955.
- February 14 – Fox Blevins, 75, third baseman for the Little Rock Grays, Homestead Grays and Oakland Larks of the Negro leagues between 1932 and 1946.
- February 17 – Red Ruffing, 80, Hall of Fame and six-time All-Star pitcher who played for the Boston Red Sox, New York Yankees and Chicago White Sox in a span of 22 seasons from 1924 to 1947, whose 273 career victories included four straight 20-win seasons for the Yankees from 1936 to 1939, also helping the team win six World Series titles and going 7–2 in nine series decisions, while hitting a .269/.306/.389 slash line with 36 home runs and 273 runs batted in in 882 regular games, including at least a .303 batting average eight times.
- February 20 – Bob Rice, 86, third baseman who played for the 1926 Philadelphia Phillies.
- February 22 – Duke Lattimore, 81, diminutive catcher—listed as 5 feet 6 inches (1.68 m) tall and 141 pounds (64 kg)—who played for the Birmingham Black Sox and Columbus Blue Birds of the Negro leagues between 1929 and 1933.
- February 25 – George Susce, 78, backup catcher and longtime coach whose MLB career spanned 44 years; played sporadically (146 career games) for the Philadelphia Phillies, Detroit Tigers, Pittsburgh Pirates, St. Louis Browns and Cleveland Indians in all or parts of eight seasons between 1929 and 1944; his son pitched in the American League during the 1950s.

=== March ===
- March 2
  - Jocko Collins, 80, longtime scout for six MLB teams who signed players such as Dick Allen, Del Ennis and Tommy Lasorda to their first pro contracts.
  - William D. Mullins, 54, pitcher in the Washington Senators minor league farm system in the 1950s.
- March 3 – Paul Castner, 89, pitcher for the 1923 Chicago White Sox.
- March 5 – Andy Love, 78, first baseman/outfielder who played for the Negro leagues' Detroit Stars, Washington Pilots and Harrisburg Stars between 1930 and 1943.
- March 7 – Jimmy Moore, 82, outfielder who played from 1930 to 1931 for the Chicago White Sox and Philadelphia Athletics.
- March 12 – Fred Hancock, 65, shortstop who played for the Chicago White Sox in 1949.
- March 13 – Jack Warner, 82, third baseman whose career spanned from 1921 through 1946, including stints in the major leagues with the Detroit Tigers, Brooklyn Robins and Philadelphia Phillies during eight seasons between 1925 and 1932.
- March 15 – Bill Patton, 73, backup catcher for Philadelphia Athletics in the 1935 season.
- March 24 – Hank Grampp, 82, pitcher who played for the Chicago Cubs in the 1927 and 1929 seasons.
- March 25 – George Grant, 83, pitcher who played for the St. Louis Browns, Cleveland Indians and Pittsburgh Pirates in a span of seven seasons from 1923 to 1931.
- March 26 – Mel Bosser, 72, pitcher who played for the Cincinnati Reds in the 1945 season.

=== April ===
- April 9
  - Dick Kokos, 58, fourth outfielder who played for the St. Louis Browns and Baltimore Orioles over part of five seasons spanning 1948–1954.
  - Les Pearson, 76, outfielder who played for the 1937 St. Louis Stars of the Negro American League.
- April 10 – Luther Harvel, 80, whose baseball career spanned nearly five decades, playing center field for the Cleveland Indians in 1924 and in the minor leagues in 14 seasons between 1929 and 1949, managing from 1933 to 1949, and later scouting for the Kansas City and Oakland Athletics, Cleveland Indians and Los Angeles Dodgers in a span of eight years from 1967 through 1974.
- April 14 – Doc Land, 82, center fielder who played in 1929 for the Washington Senators.
- April 18 – George Durning, 87, right fielder for the 1925 Philadelphia Phillies.
- April 20 – Eddie Feinberg, 68, middle infielder/utility player for the Philadelphia Phillies in the 1938 and 1939 seasons.
- April 27 – Marty Karow, 81, one of the finest all-around athletes in Ohio State University history during the early 1920s, who later played at shortstop and third base for the Boston Red Sox in its 1927 season.
- April 28 – Pat Seerey, 63, strikeout-prone outfielder who played from 1943 through 1949 for the Cleveland Indians and Chicago White Sox; one of a select group of players who have hit four home runs in a single game, accomplishing the feat on July 18, 1948, at Shibe Park, Philadelphia, against the Athletics.
- April 30 – Bill Higdon, 62, outfielder who played for the Chicago White Sox in its 1949 season.

=== May ===
- May 1 – Ed Wells, 85, pitcher who played for the Detroit Tigers, New York Yankees and St. Louis Browns in all or part of eleven seasons spanning 1923–1934, posting an overall record of 68–69 and a 4.65 ERA, leading the American League in shutouts in 1926 and winning a 1932 World Series ring while pitching for the Yankees.
- May 4
  - Hugh "Hal" Luby, 72, second and third baseman in 120 games with the Philadelphia Athletics (1936) and New York Giants (1944); a fixture in Pacific Coast League, principally for the Oakland Oaks and San Francisco Seals over nine seasons spanning 1938–1948, playing 866 consecutive games between 1939 and 1943; batted .296 in 2,824 minor-league games and amassed 3,165 hits, earning an induction into the Pacific Coast League Hall of Fame.
  - Paul Richards, 77, catcher, manager and executive; played in 523 games over eight MLB seasons between 1932 and 1946 with the Brooklyn Dodgers, New York Giants, Philadelphia Athletics and Detroit Tigers; member of 1945 World Series champion Tigers, starting six of the series' seven games behind the plate; managed the Chicago White Sox (1951–1954 and 1976) and Baltimore Orioles (1955–1961); from September 1954 through 1958, doubled as general manager (GM) of the Orioles, helping build the club that dominated the American League in the late 1960s and early 1970s; also helped build the Houston Colt .45s/Astros franchise as GM of the expansion team from September 1961 through 1965, then served as GM of the Atlanta Braves (1966–1972).
  - Johnny Williams, 68, three-time All-Star pitcher for the Birmingham Black Barons and Cincinnati–Indianapolis Clowns of the Negro American League between 1943 and 1948.
- May 6 – Len Schulte, 69, middle infielder and third baseman who played from 1944 through 1946 for the St. Louis Browns; brother of Ham Schulte.
- May 14
  - Frank O'Rourke, 92, Canadian ballplayer who performed at all four infield positions, primarily at third base, while debuting as the third youngest player in the National League at 17 years age, playing for six teams in part of 13 seasons spanning 1912–1931, mostly with the St. Louis Browns of the American League from 1927 to 1931, and later serving as a longtime scout for the New York Yankees, being inducted posthumously into the Canadian Baseball Hall of Fame in 1996.
  - Joe Sparma, 44, pitcher who posted a 52–52 record and a 3.94 ERA for the Detroit Tigers and Montreal Expos in seven seasons from 1964 to 1970, and also a member of the 1968 World Series champion Tigers.
  - Tom Turner, 69, catcher who played with the Chicago White Sox and the St. Louis Browns in five seasons from 1940 through 1944.
- May 18 – Spades Wood, 77, pitcher who played from 1930 to 1931 for the Pittsburgh Pirates.
- May 23 – Hugh McMullen, 84, part-time catcher for the New York Giants, Washington Senators and Cincinnati Reds over four seasons between 1925 and 1929.
- May 28
  - Taylor Douthit, 85, outfielder who played for the St. Louis Cardinals, Cincinnati Reds and Chicago Cubs in 11 seasons from 1923 to 1933, also a member of the 1926 World Series Champion Cardinals, whose glove is in the Baseball Hall of Fame for a record he set in 1928, when he made 547 putouts in center field for St. Louis, the most in a season by an outfielder in Major League Baseball history.
  - Paul Florence, 86, backup catcher for the 1926 New York Giants, whose baseball career spanned almost 60 years, while playing 12 seasons in the minor leagues and later working as a scout and executive in the Cincinnati Reds and Houston Astros organizations.
- May 31 – Dixie McArthur, 84, pitcher who played for the Pittsburgh Pirates in its 1914 season.

=== June ===
- June 5
  - Joe Mulligan, 72, pitcher for the 1934 Boston Red Sox.
  - Jesse Winters, 82, pitcher who played from 1919 through 1923 for the New York Giants and Philadelphia Phillies.
- June 6 – John Carmichael, 83, Chicago sportswriter from 1927 to 1972, primarily for the Chicago Herald-Examiner and later for the Chicago Daily News, where he wrote his famed column, The Barber Shop, winning a J. G. Taylor Spink Award in 1974.
- June 9 – Milton Richman, 64, sportswriter who spent 42 years with United Press International, being honored with the J. G. Taylor Spink Award in 1981, while receiving nominations for the Pulitzer Prize in both 1957 and 1981.
- June 11 – Porter Charleston, 82, pitcher who hurled in four different Negro leagues between 1927 and 1936, notably for the Hilldale club.
- June 21 – Arnie Portocarrero, 54, pitcher who played with the Philadelphia and Kansas City Athletics from 1954 to 1957 and for the Baltimore Orioles from 1958 to 1960; as a rookie, was the winningest pitcher for the Athletics, who lost 103 games that year; enjoyed his career-best season in 1958, when he won 15 games for the Orioles, fifth most wins in the American League, finishing tenth in earned run average (3.25), including three shutouts and five consecutive complete game victories.
- June 24 – Loy Hanning, 68, pitcher who played for the St. Louis Browns over part of two seasons spanning 1939–1942.
- June 29 – Thomas Albright, 76, Negro leagues pitcher who hurled for the 1929 Atlantic City Bacharach Giants and 1936 New York Cubans.

=== July ===
- July 2 – Peanuts Lowrey, 68, former child actor who became an All-Star outfielder and third baseman; played for the Chicago Cubs, Cincinnati Reds, St. Louis Cardinals and Philadelphia Phillies through 13 seasons from 1942 to 1955, appearing in 978 games and being regarded as one of the best utility men and pinch-hitters of his generation; posted a .310 batting average and .678 OPS for the Cubs in the 1945 World Series; also performed during the 1940s in offseason exhibition games, occasionally playing alongside future Hall of Famers including Cool Papa Bell, Jimmie Foxx, Ralph Kiner, Bob Lemon, Buck Leonard, Satchel Paige and Ted Williams; spent 18 years as an MLB coach for five teams between 1960 and 1981.
- July 3 – Bill McCahan, 65, pitcher who posted a 16–14 record and 3.84 ERA in 57 games for the Philadelphia Athletics from 1946 to 1949, including a no-hitter against the Washington Senators in 1947.
- July 4 – Oscar Roettger, 86, first baseman and pitcher who played for the New York Yankees, Brooklyn Robins and Philadelphia Athletics over part of four seasons from 1923 to 1932; brother of Wally Roettger.
- July 6 – Eddie Yuhas, 61, pitcher for the St. Louis Cardinals during two seasons from 1952 to 1953.
- July 8
  - Johnny Cooney, 85, pitcher, outfielder and first baseman for the Boston Bees/Braves, Brooklyn Dodgers and New York Yankees in 20 seasons from 1921 to 1944; a longtime coach who also managed the Braves for the final five weeks of 1949 during the medical leave of Billy Southworth; son and brother of big-league players.
  - Skeeter Webb, 76, middle infielder who played for the St. Louis Cardinals, Cleveland Indians, Chicago White Sox, Detroit Tigers, and Philadelphia Athletics over part of 12 seasons between 1932 and 1948.
- July 9 – Red Lucas, 84, solid two-way pitcher and prolific pinch-hitter, who played for the New York Giants, Boston Braves, Cincinnati Reds and Pittsburgh Pirates in a span of 15 seasons from 1923 to 1938, posting a 157–135 record with a 3.72 ERA in 396 pitching appearances and amassing 204 complete games and 22 shutouts, while recording a .280 batting average and 404 hits, 114 of them in pinch-hitting duties, including three home runs.
- July 10 – Harl Maggert, 72, outfielder who appeared in 66 games for the 1938 Boston Bees; his father, also an outfielder, had a brief MLB career.
- July 14 – Wally Holborow, 72, pitched in 21 MLB games for the 1944–1945 Washington Senators and 1948 Philadelphia Athletics.
- July 20 – Bill Steinecke, 79, catcher who played four games for 1931 Pirates but whose long minor-league career as a player and manager spanned 1925 to 1964.

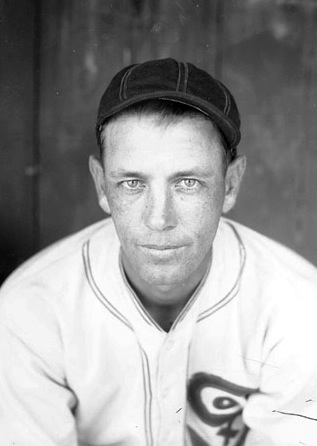
Ted Lyons in 1930

- July 25 – Ted Lyons, 85, Hall of Fame and All-Star pitcher who spent his entire 21-year career with the Chicago White Sox, from 1923 through 1942, and again in 1946; served in United States Marine Corps in the Pacific during wartime; compiled a 260–230 record and 3.67 ERA in 594 games for a usually mediocre team, while leading the American League in wins, innings pitched, complete games and shutouts twice each; went 22–15 with AL-leading totals of 29 complete games and 297 2/3 innings for a 62–92 team in 1930; completed every one of his 20 starts in 1942, at the age of 41, going 14–6 and leading the league with a 2.10 ERA; threw a no-hitter in 1926 against the Boston Red Sox at Fenway Park, which took just one hour and 45 minutes to complete; managed the White Sox from May 26, 1946, through 1948, posting a 185–245 record; then served as pitching coach of Detroit Tigers and Brooklyn Dodgers between 1949 and 1954.
- July 26 – Webb Schultz, 88, pitcher who played for the 1924 Chicago White Sox.
- July 27 – Bud Hafey, 73, outfielder who played for the Chicago White Sox, Pittsburgh Pirates, Cincinnati Reds and Philadelphia Phillies in a span of three seasons from 1935 to 1939.
- July 28
  - Cliff Melton, 74, left-handed pitcher for the New York Giants over all or part of eight seasons spanning 1937–1944; went 20–9 (2.61) as rookie for pennant-winning Giants.
  - Joe Oeschger, 94, pitcher known for his durable arm while pitching for six different teams in 12 seasons from 1914 to 1925, who shares an MLB record for the most innings pitched while playing for the Boston Braves in 1920, locked in a pitching duel with Leon Cadore of the Brooklyn Dodgers during 26 innings in a 1–1 tie eventually called because of darkness, as both pitchers had gone the distance.
  - Carl Whitney, 72, outfielder who played for the New York Black Yankees and Newark Eagles of the Negro National League in 1942.
- July 30 – Mickey Heath, 82, first baseman who played from 1931 to 1932 for the Cincinnati Reds.

=== August ===
- August 9 – Clarence Maddern, 64, outfielder for the Chicago Cubs and Cleveland Indians over part of three seasons spanning 1946–1951.
- August 11 – Tom Gorman, 67, who pitched for the New York Giants in 1939 and went on to serve as a National League umpire from 1951 to 1976, working in five World Series, five All-Star games, two NL Championship Series and nine no-hitters, before becoming a league supervisor.
- August 17
  - Walt Lanfranconi, 69, pitcher who played with the Chicago Cubs in 1941 and for the Boston Braves in 1947.
  - Sammy Vick, 91, part-time right fielder who played for the New York Yankees and Boston Red Sox during five seasons between 1917 and 1921.
- August 22
  - Lamb Barbee, 70, outfielder for the 1945 Cincinnati–Indianapolis Clowns of the Negro American League.
  - Charlie Eckert, 89, pitcher for the Philadelphia Athletics in a span of three seasons from 1919 to 1922.
- August 23 – William Evans, 87, outfielder for seven Negro leagues clubs, including the Homestead Grays, between 1924 and 1937; great-great-uncle of Meghan Markle, Duchess of Sussex.
- August 24 – George Diehl, 68, pitcher for the Boston Braves in the 1942 and 1943 seasons.

=== September ===
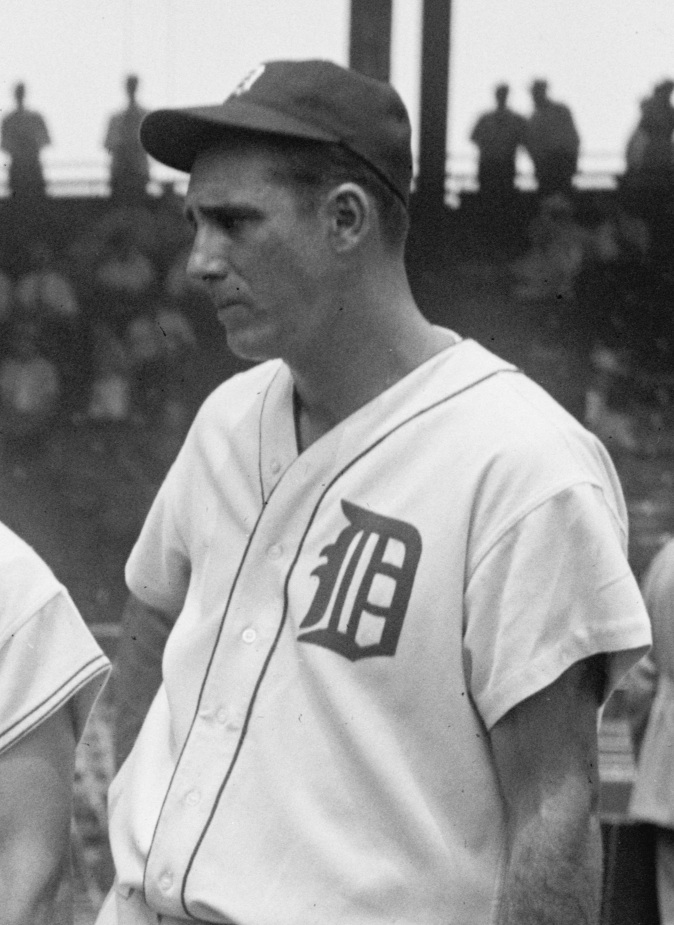
Hank Greenberg, Hall of Famer and two-time MVP

- September 2 – Jim Wilson, 64, whose career spanned more than four decades as an MLB pitcher, scout and front-office executive; played for five teams in 12 seasons between 1945 and 1958, primarily with the Boston/Milwaukee Braves from 1951 to 1954; selected to the All-Star team three times (representing both leagues) and gained fame by pitching the first no-hitter game in Milwaukee MLB history in 1954; general manager of Milwaukee Brewers (1973–1974) and head of the MLB Scouting Bureau (1974–1985).
- September 4 – Hank Greenberg, 75, Hall of Fame and five-time All-Star first baseman and left fielder who won MVP awards at both positions; member of four Detroit Tigers World Series teams which won championships in 1935 and 1945; led the American League in home runs and runs batted in four times each, including career-highs with 58 HR in 1938 and 184 RBI in 1937; won the 1945 AL pennant on last day with a grand slam, ending his career with a slash line of .313/.412/.605 with 331 homers and 1,276 RBI in 1,134 games; after finishing his playing career with the Pittsburgh Pirates in 1947, he became a front office executive, serving as farm system director (1948) and general manager (1949–1957) of Cleveland Indians and vice president/GM (1959–1961) of Chicago White Sox; held ownership stakes in Indians (1956–1957) and White Sox (1959–1961 and 1976–1980).
- September 11 – Otho Nitcholas, 77, pitcher who played for the Brooklyn Dodgers in its 1945 season.
- September 12 – Jim Shilling, 72, middle infielder and third baseman who divided his playing time between the Cleveland Indians and the Philadelphia Phillies in 1939.
- September 14 – Gordon McLendon, 65, broadcaster and entrepreneur whose Liberty Radio Network carried his "Baseball Game of the Day" broadcasts—most of them studio recreations and many announced by McLendon, as "The Old Scotchman", himself—into small cities and towns across the U.S. between 1949 and 1952.
- September 27 – Chuck Sheerin, 77, part-time infielder for the 1936 Philadelphia Phillies.
- September 29 – Artie Gore, 78, National League umpire from 1947 to 1956; worked in 1,464 contests over his ten NL seasons, plus two World Series and two All-Star games.

=== October ===
- October 3
  - Vince DiMaggio, 74, oldest brother of Joe and Dom, two-time All-Star center fielder who played for the Boston Bees, Cincinnati Reds, Pittsburgh Pirates, Philadelphia Phillies and New York Giants in a span of ten seasons from 1935 to 1946, whose career highlights included batting 21 home runs and 100 runs batted in for the 1941 Pirates, four grand slams for the Phillies from 1945 to 1946, and collecting a home run, triple, single, a pair of runs and one RBI over three at-bats in the 1943 All-Star Game.
  - Heinie Mueller, 74, who played every infield position for the Philadelphia Phillies in part of four seasons from 1938 to 1941, being best known by hitting a leadoff home run in his first major league at bat.
- October 8 – Max Surkont, 64, pitcher for the Chicago White Sox, Boston/Milwaukee Braves, Pittsburgh Pirates, St. Louis Cardinals and New York Giants over nine seasons from 1949 through 1957, who set a major league record with eight consecutive strikeouts while pitching for the Braves in 1953, as the record stood until 1970, when future Hall of Famer Tom Seaver struck out ten in a row.
- October 9 – Jo-Jo White, 77, starting center fielder for the Detroit Tigers teams that won the American League pennant in 1934 and the 1935 World Series, who also played for the Philadelphia Athletics and Cincinnati Reds and later coached for five teams from 1959 through 1969, including a brief stint as a manager with Cleveland Indians in August 1960; father of Mike White.
- October 10 – Russ Van Atta, 80, pitcher for the New York Yankees and the St. Louis Browns over a seven-season career from 1933 to 1939, who made history in his debut pitching a four-hit shutout against the Washington Senators, 16–0, while recording four hits in four at-bats, becoming the only American League pitcher ever to get four hits in his major league debut, as well as one of only seven players in AL history to do so in a debut game, being the last the Hall of Famer Kirby Puckett, who registered four singles in his first MLB appearance with the Minnesota Twins in 1984.

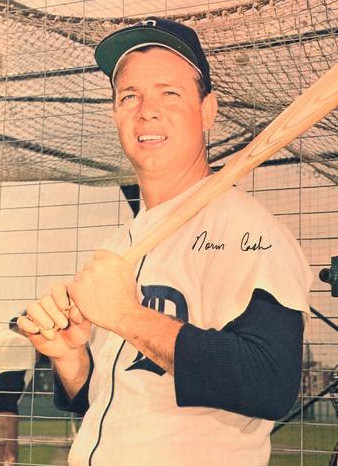
Norm Cash in 1966

- October 12 – Norm Cash, 51, first baseman who appeared in just 71 games with the Chicago White Sox in 1958–1959 before becoming a Detroit Tigers' fixture for the next 15 years; won 1961 American League batting title (.361) and a World Series ring and selected to five All-Star Games; hit 40 home runs (with 132 RBI) in 1961 and slugged 30 or more homers four more times and at least 20 in six seasons; holds Tigers' career defensive records at first base in games (1,912), putouts (14,926), assists (1,303), double plays (1,328) and fielding average (.992), while his 373 home runs with the Tigers is tied for second (with Miguel Cabrera) in franchise history behind Al Kaline (399).
- October 15 – Larry Kopf, 95, shortstop who played with four different teams in a span of ten seasons from 1913 to 1923, as well as a member of the 1919 World Series Champions Reds, whose greatest single feat came at Weeghman Park in 1917, when he broke up the famous double no-hit game pitched by Hippo Vaughn of the Chicago Cubs and Fred Toney of the Reds, as Kopf hit a one-out single in the 10th inning, advanced to second base on an error by center fielder Cy Williams, and later scored on an infield hit by legendary Jim Thorpe, being able to beat the throw to home plate and score the game's only run, while Toney completed his no-hitter in the bottom of the inning for a 1–0 Reds victory.
- October 19 – George Pipgras, 86, American League starting pitcher, umpire and scout, who played for the New York Yankees and the Boston Red Sox over 11 seasons spanning 1923–1935, leading the American League with 24 wins, 38 starts and 300 2/3 innings in 1928, also winning four World Series rings with the Yankees between 1923 and 1932, while umpiring from 1939 to 1945, including officiating in the 1944 World Series as well as the 1940 All-Star Game, finishing his baseball career supervising umpires from 1946 to 1949 and working as a scout for the Red Sox.
- October 23 – Paul Gehrman, 74, pitcher for the 1937 Cincinnati Reds.
- October 26 – Ed Holley, 87, pitcher who played with the Chicago Cubs, Philadelphia Phillies and Pittsburgh Pirates over part of four seasons spanning 1928–1934.

=== November ===
- November 3 – John Middleton, 86, pitcher for the Cleveland Indians in its 1922 season.
- November 10 – Doc Sykes, 94, pitcher in the Negro leagues and Black baseball between 1914 and 1924; became a dentist and practiced in Alabama and Maryland after his playing career.
- November 12
  - Rocky Stone, 68, pitcher who played for the Cincinnati Reds in 1943.
  - Joe Strong, 84, pitcher/outfielder and graduate of Wilberforce University who appeared for eight Negro leagues teams between 1922 and 1937; twice led his circuit's pitchers in earned run average, and batted .268 lifetime.
- November 13
  - Dixie Upright, 60, slugging minor league first baseman who made nine appearances as a pinch-hitter by the St. Louis Browns in 1953, going 2-for-8 with a home run, one RBI and three runs scored.
  - Les Webber, 71. pitcher who played for the Brooklyn Dodgers and the Cleveland Indians in part of six seasons spanning 1942–1948.
- November 30 – Roy Bruner, 69, one of many ballplayers who interrupted their careers to serve during wartime, pitching for the Philadelphia Phillies from 1939 through 1941 before becoming a bomber pilot with the rank of lieutenant, flying in 50 missions in Europe while being shut down on at least one occasion.

=== December ===
- December 3 – Bob Moorhead, 48, original New York Met and the second pitcher in franchise history, relieving starter Roger Craig in the fourth inning on Opening Day, April 11, 1962; appeared in 38 games for the hapless 1962 Mets and nine more for the 1965 edition.
- December 5 – George Abrams, 87, pitcher who made three relief appearances for the Cincinnati Reds in its 1923 season.
- December 7 – John Bogart, 86, pitcher who played with the Detroit Tigers in 1920.
- December 8 – Pip Koehler, 84, part-time outfielder for the 1925 New York Giants.
- December 10 – Si Burick, 77, sportswriter for the Dayton Daily News for 58 years, who covered the Cincinnati Reds and became the first writer from a non-major league city to be honored by the Hall of Fame with the J. G. Taylor Spink Award.
- December 12 – Johnny Wyrostek, 67, two-time All-Star outfielder for the Philadelphia Phillies and Cincinnati Reds over 11 seasons between 1942 and 1954.
- December 16 – Jake Caulfield, 69, backup shortstop for the 1946 Philadelphia Athletics.
- December 18 – Bill Shanner, 92, pitcher who made one appearance for the Philadelphia Athletics in its 1920 season.
- December 19 – Al Stokes, 86, catcher who played from 1925 to 1926 for the Boston Red Sox.
- December 20 – Joe DeSa, 27, Puerto Rican first baseman who played with the St. Louis Cardinals in 1980 and for the Chicago White Sox in 1985.
- December 23 – Dan Wilson, 71, five-time All-Star as an outfielder for five Negro leagues clubs between 1936 and 1947; brother of Emmett Wilson.
- December 27 – Jack Wallaesa, 67 part-time shortstop for the Philadelphia Athletics and Chicago White Sox in a span of five seasons from 1940 to 1948.
- December 28 – Harry Else, 80, catcher for the Memphis Red Sox, Kansas City Monarchs and Chicago American Giants of the Negro leagues between 1932 and 1940.
- December 31 – Provine Bradley, 79, pitcher/second baseman/outfielder for the Cincinnati Tigers and Memphis Red Sox of the Negro American League in 1937–1938.
