= Dallas Green (baseball) =

American baseball player and manager (1934–2017)

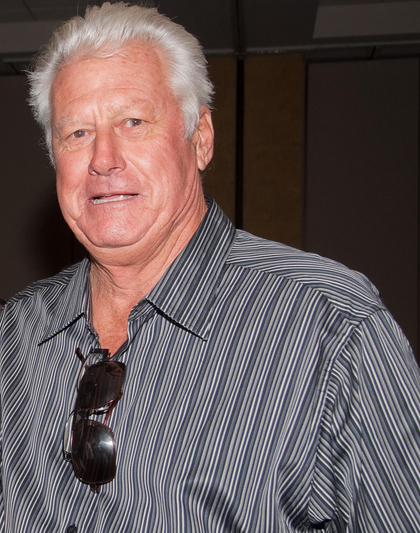
- Green in 2009
- Pitcher / Manager
- Born: August 4, 1934; Newport, Delaware, U.S.
- Died: March 22, 2017 (aged 82); Philadelphia, Pennsylvania, U.S.
- Batted: Left Threw: Right

MLB debut
- June 18, 1960, for the Philadelphia Phillies

Last MLB appearance
- September 12, 1967, for the Philadelphia Phillies

MLB statistics
- Win–loss record: 20–22
- Earned run average: 4.26
- Strikeouts: 268
- Managerial record: 454–478
- Winning %: .487
- Stats at Baseball Reference
- Managerial record at Baseball Reference

Teams
- As player: Philadelphia Phillies (1960–1964); Washington Senators (1965); New York Mets (1966); Philadelphia Phillies (1967); As manager: Philadelphia Phillies (1979–1981); New York Yankees (1989); New York Mets (1993–1996)

Career highlights and awards
- World Series champion (1980); Philadelphia Phillies Wall of Fame

George Dallas Green (August 4, 1934 – March 22, 2017) was an American professional baseball pitcher, manager, scout and executive in Major League Baseball (MLB). He played big league baseball for the Philadelphia Phillies, Washington Senators and New York Mets, from 1960 through 1967. A man of towering stature, at 6 feet 5 inches (1.96 m) tall and 210 pounds (95 kg), Green achieved notoriety for his blunt manner. He possessed a booming voice and achieved many successes over a baseball career that lasted over 60 years.

After his career as a pitcher, minor league manager, and farm system director, Green went on to manage the Phillies, New York Yankees and Mets for all or portions of eight seasons between 1979 and 1996. He led the Phillies to their third National League pennant and the first World Series title in their 97-year history in 1980, when they defeated the Kansas City Royals.

As general manager of the Chicago Cubs from 1981 to 1987, Green built the club that won a division title in 1984 — the Cubs' first postseason appearance in 39 years. In 1983, he was inducted into the Delaware Sports Hall of Fame.

== Early life and playing career ==
Green was born in Newport, Delaware. He was the middle of three children. Green graduated from Conrad High School, and attended the University of Delaware. He played as a pitcher and right fielder for the Delaware Fightin' Blue Hens baseball team and was a two-year letterman in basketball for Delaware. After Green pitched to a 6–0 win–loss record and an 0.88 earned run average (ERA) in 1955, his junior year, Jocko Collins, a scout for the Philadelphia Phillies, signed Green as an amateur free agent.

Green made his major league debut with the Phillies in 1960. Pitching for the Phillies, Senators and Mets, Green had a career 20–22 record and 4.26 ERA, in 185 total games, with 46 games started.

== Managing and front office career ==
=== Philadelphia Phillies ===
After his playing career ended, Green managed the Huron Phillies of the Class A-Short Season Northern League, in 1968 and the Pulaski Phillies of the Rookie-level Appalachian League in 1969. Pulaski won the Appalachian League championship. In 1970, he joined the Phillies' front office as an assistant to farm system director Paul Owens. When Owens was promoted to general manager in June of 1972, Green succeeded him as the Phils' director of player development.

On August 31, 1979, the Phillies hired Green as their field manager, replacing easy-going Danny Ozark. When Green was appointed to the position, he matter-of-factly stated: "I express my thoughts. I'm a screamer, a yeller, and a cusser. I never hold back." Green was notorious for his liberal use of profanity. His difficult manner led to clashes with many of the team's star players, such as slugger Greg Luzinski, shortstop Larry Bowa, and catcher Bob Boone. Titanic blows were exchanged between the 6 ft 5 in Green and 6 ft 6 in (1.98 m) relief pitcher Ron Reed. Still, come October, it was Green manning the helm, guiding the Phillies to victory, in the 1980 World Series — the team’s first World Series title in its 98-year history. Through 1981, he managed Philadelphia to a 169–130 record. In 1981, the team again made the postseason, by virtue of having won the East division, in the first half of the strike-split season; however, the Phillies lost to the Montreal Expos in the National League Division Series, 3 games to 2.

=== Chicago Cubs ===
Following the Tribune Company's purchase of the Chicago Cubs from the Wrigley family in 1981, the company hired Green away from Philadelphia after the 1981 season as executive vice president and general manager. His presence was quickly felt in the organization, as his slogan "Building a New Tradition" was a jab at the Cubs' history of losing. Green hired a number of coaches and scouts away from the Phillies, such as Lee Elia, John Vukovich, and Gordon Goldsberry. Green also made some trades with the Phillies, acquiring players such as Bowa, Keith Moreland, Dickie Noles, and Ryne Sandberg.

Green continued to build the Cubs between the 1982 and 1987 seasons. After acquiring left fielder Gary Matthews and center fielder Bob Dernier from Philadelphia, before the 1984 season, Green's Cubs became serious contenders for the first time in more than a decade. During the 1984 season, Green made a few more moves, most notably acquiring right-handed pitcher Dennis Eckersley from the Boston Red Sox for popular first baseman Bill Buckner in late May, and sending Cubs' prospects Mel Hall and Joe Carter to the Cleveland Indians for relief pitcher George Frazier, backup catcher Ron Hassey, and right-handed pitcher Rick Sutcliffe, in mid-June. Sutcliffe went 16–1 with the Cubs that season to lead the Cubs to the National League East title — their first postseason appearance of any kind since the 1945 World Series. Because Green neglected to renew waivers on Hall and Carter, the status of the trade was in doubt for a while, and the two did not play for a week. Green's first-year manager Jim Frey won NL Manager of the Year, Sutcliffe won the NL Cy Young Award, and Sandberg won the NL Most Valuable Player Award. Green was named The Sporting News Executive of the Year. Green then won a power struggle within the Cubs front office; he was promoted to team president, replacing Jim Finks, who resigned to take a job with the New Orleans Saints of the National Football League.

As it turned out, this was the high point of Green's tenure in Chicago. The Cubs struggled in 1985 and 1986, and fell to last place in 1987. After Green blasted the Cubs for quitting in 1987, manager Gene Michael resigned over Labor Day weekend. Green himself left the Cubs in October 1987, citing "philosophical differences" with Tribune Company executives.

Green was the first Cubs executive to clash with the city of Chicago over the installation of lights in Wrigley Field. Green was a strong proponent of lights from the start of his tenure, but a city ordinance prohibited the Cubs from installing lights in the residential Lakeview neighborhood, where Wrigley Field was located. As Green saw it, the issue was not lights or no lights, but stay at Wrigley Field or move to the suburbs. Bluntly stating that "if there are no lights in Wrigley Field, there will be no Wrigley Field," he threatened to move the Cubs to a new stadium in northwest suburban Schaumburg or Arlington Heights. He also considered shutting down Wrigley Field for a year and playing at Comiskey Park as tenants of the Chicago White Sox, in hopes that the loss of revenue would temper or eliminate neighborhood opposition. Green's stance changed the context of the debate, as even the staunchest opponents of installing lights did not want to be held responsible for the Cubs leaving town. Shortly before Green's departure, the Chicago City Council and Mayor Harold Washington approved a change to the ordinance, allowing the Cubs to install lights in 1988. Green also rebuilt the Cubs' farm system with Goldsberry, developing stars like Shawon Dunston, Greg Maddux, Rafael Palmeiro, Jamie Moyer, and Mark Grace. The Cubs won a division title in 1989.

=== New York Yankees ===
After the 1988 season, the New York Yankees fired manager Lou Piniella, replacing him with Green. The Yankees had slumped to fall out of the playoff race late in 1988, and team owner George Steinbrenner wanted a manager who would be more of a disciplinarian with the players. With the 1989 Yankees, he was also under .500 at 56–65 (.463). The team had finished nine games over .500 the prior year, but fell to nine games under .500 during Green's tenure. Green insulted Steinbrenner by referring to him as "Manager George" for his meddling with the team. Steinbrenner fired Green, in August 1989.

=== New York Mets ===
In 1991, the New York Mets hired Green as a scout. During the 1993 season, the Mets fired manager Jeff Torborg, and hired Green for the position. During his tenure with the Mets, he was under .500 at 229–283 (.447). The Mets fired Green in 1996, replacing him with Bobby Valentine.

=== Late career ===
In 1998, Green returned to the Phillies as a senior advisor to the general manager. He would remain with the Philadelphia organization, serving in various capacities, for the remainder of his life.

Green's overall managerial record was 454–478, a .487 winning percentage.

== Managerial record ==
| Team | Year | Regular season | | | | | Postseason | | | |
| Team | Year | Games | Won | Lost | Win % | Finish | Won | Lost | Win % | Result |
|---|---|---|---|---|---|---|---|---|---|---|
| PHI | 1979 | 30 | 19 | 11 | .633 | 4th in NL East | – | – | – | – |
| PHI | 1980 | 162 | 91 | 71 | .562 | 1st in NL East | 7 | 4 | .636 | Won World Series (KC) |
| PHI | 1981 | 55 | 34 | 21 | .618 | 1st in NL East | 2 | 3 | .400 | Lost NLDS (MON) |
| PHI | 1981 | 52 | 25 | 27 | .481 | 3rd in NL East | 2 | 3 | .400 | Lost NLDS (MON) |
| PHI total | | 299 | 169 | 130 | .565 | | 9 | 7 | .563 | |
| NYY | 1989 | 121 | 56 | 65 | .463 | fired | – | – | – | – |
| NYY total | | 121 | 56 | 65 | .463 | | 0 | 0 | – | |
| NYM | 1993 | 124 | 46 | 78 | .371 | 7th in NL East | – | – | – | – |
| NYM | 1994 | 113 | 55 | 58 | .487 | 3rd in NL East | – | – | – | – |
| NYM | 1995 | 144 | 69 | 75 | .479 | 2nd in NL East | – | – | – | – |
| NYM | 1996 | 131 | 59 | 72 | .450 | fired | – | – | – | – |
| NYM total | | 512 | 229 | 283 | .447 | | 0 | 0 | – | |
| Total | | 932 | 454 | 478 | .487 | | 9 | 7 | .563 | |

== Personal life ==
On January 31, 1958, Green married Sylvia Lowe Taylor at Calvary United Presbyterian Church in Hayden Park, Delaware. The couple had four children, and remained married until his death.

Green's nine-year-old granddaughter, Christina-Taylor Green, was killed in the 2011 Tucson shooting that critically wounded Rep. Gabby Giffords. Her interest in government prompted a neighbor to take her to the event with the congresswoman. Green, after receiving the news of his granddaughter's death, said that this was the worst thing that had ever happened to his family.

His son, John Dallas Green, Christina's father, is the global cross-checker of scouting for the Los Angeles Dodgers.

== Death ==
On March 22, 2017, Green died at Hahnemann University Hospital in Philadelphia, from kidney failure, complicated with pneumonia.

The Phillies wore a patch on their uniform sleeves, featuring a capital D with the team's 70s- and 80s-era “baseball inside the P” logo — the one used during his tenure as the team’s skipper — in the middle color area, featuring the team's colors, red and white, in a black circle, during the 2017 season, in his memory.

Sporting positions
| Preceded by Joe Lonnett | Huron Phillies Manager; 1968 | Succeeded by last manager |
| Preceded by | Pulaski Phillies Manager; 1969 | Succeeded by Brandy Davis |
