= 1986 Junior League World Series =

Tournament information
- Location: Taylor, Michigan
- Dates: August 11–16

Final positions
- Champions: Waldorf, Maryland
- Runner-up: Athens County, Ohio

The 1986 Junior League World Series took place from August 11–16 in Taylor, Michigan, United States. Waldorf, Maryland defeated Athens County, Ohio in the championship game.

This year featured the debut of the Mexico Region.

== Teams ==
| United States | International |
|---|---|
| (Michigan) Ypsilanti, Michigan Host | (Sonora) Hermosillo, Sonora Mexico |
| (Ohio) Athens County, Ohio Central | Yabucoa, Puerto Rico Puerto Rico |
| (Maryland) Waldorf, Maryland East | |
(West Virginia) Chapmanville, West Virginia South
(California) Union City, California West

== Results ==
Upper round 1 | Upper round 2 | Upper final | World Championship
— | Michigan | 0
— | Maryland | 7
1–0 | Maryland | 13
1–0 | Mexico | 1
— | Mexico | 5
— | California | 4
2–0 | Maryland | 18
1–0 | Ohio | 13
— | West Virginia | 2
— | Puerto Rico | 12
1–0 | Puerto Rico | 1
— | Ohio | 4
3–0 | Maryland | 4 | —
2–1 | Ohio | 3 | —
Lower round 1 | Lower round 2 | Lower round 3 | Lower final
1–1 | Puerto Rico | 6
0–1 | Michigan | 1 | 1–1 | California | 3 | 1–1 | Ohio | 9
0–1 | California | 13 | 2–1 | Puerto Rico | 3 | 3–1 | Puerto Rico | 7
2–1 | Mexico | 1
1–1 | Mexico | 8
0–1 | West Virginia | 5

| Consolation Game |
| 0–2 | Michigan | 1 |
| 0–2 | West Virginia | 6 |

1986 Junior League World Series Champions
Waldorf, Maryland
