= Cambria, Illinois =

Cambria
- Village
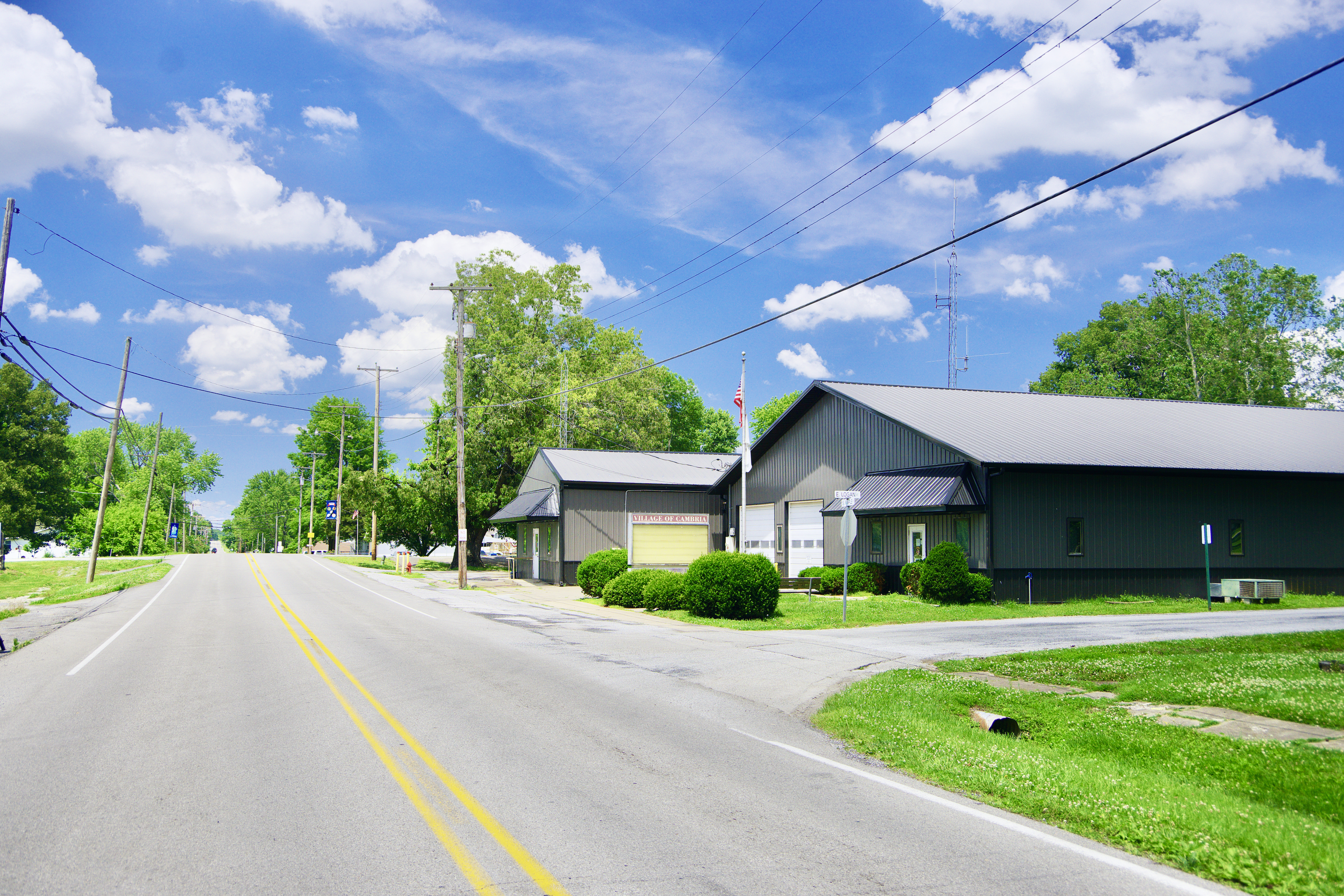
- Maple Street

- Location of Cambria in Williamson County, Illinois.
- Coordinates: 37°46′39″N 89°07′30″W
- Country: United States
- State: Illinois
- County: Williamson

Area
  - Total: 1.46 sq mi (3.78 km^{2})
  - Land: 1.41 sq mi (3.66 km^{2})
  - Water: 0.042 sq mi (0.11 km^{2})
- Elevation: 427 ft (130 m)

Population (2020)
  - Total: 1,505
  - Density: 1,063.6/sq mi (410.67/km^{2})
- Time zone: UTC-6 (CST)
  - Summer (DST): UTC-5 (CDT)
- ZIP Code: 62915
- Area code: 618
- FIPS code: 17-10630
- GNIS feature ID: 2397537
- Website: villageofcambria.com

Cambria is a village in northwestern Williamson County, Illinois, United States. As of the 2020 census, Cambria had a population of 1,505.

== History ==
Cambria was established in the early 1900s by brothers Tom and Evan John, owners of the Carterville and Big Muddy Coal Company, which had opened a mine in the area around 1904. The community was originally known as Lauder, but was changed to Cambria, the old Latin name for Wales, from which the John brothers hailed. A post office known as Reeves opened in 1905, but its name was changed to Cambria in 1911.

== Geography ==
According to the 2010 census, Cambria has a total area of 1.403 square miles (3.63 km^{2}), of which 1.36 square miles (3.52 km^{2}) (or 96.94%) is land and 0.043 square miles (0.11 km^{2}) (or 3.06%) is water.

== Demographics ==
Historical population
Census	Pop.	Note	%±
1910	658		—
1920	779		18.4%
1930	815		4.6%
1940	687		−15.7%
1950	625		−9.0%
1960	568		−9.1%
1970	798		40.5%
1980	1,090		36.6%
1990	1,230		12.8%
2000	1,330		8.1%
2010	1,228		−7.7%
2020	1,505		22.6%
U.S. Census

=== 2020 census ===
As of the 2020 census, Cambria had a population of 1,505. The median age was 33.7 years. 23.7% of residents were under the age of 18 and 14.4% of residents were 65 years of age or older. For every 100 females, there were 91.0 males, and for every 100 females age 18 and over, there were 86.4 males age 18 and over.

96.6% of residents lived in urban areas, while 3.4% lived in rural areas.

There were 649 households in Cambria, of which 30.4% had children under the age of 18 living in them. Of all households, 37.9% were married-couple households, 18.2% were households with a male householder and no spouse or partner present, and 33.7% were households with a female householder and no spouse or partner present. About 32.7% of all households were made up of individuals, and 10.9% had someone living alone who was 65 years of age or older.

There were 749 housing units, of which 13.4% were vacant. The homeowner vacancy rate was 3.7% and the rental vacancy rate was 14.4%.

Racial composition as of the 2020 census
Race	Number	Percent
White	1,227	81.5%
Black or African American	96	6.4%
American Indian and Alaska Native	13	0.9%
Asian	28	1.9%
Native Hawaiian and Other Pacific Islander	0	0.0%
Some other race	25	1.7%
Two or more races	116	7.7%
Hispanic or Latino (of any race)	75	5.0%

=== 2000 census ===
As of the census of 2000, there were 1,330 people, 564 households, and 367 families residing in the village. The population density was 974.3 inhabitants per square mile (376.2/km^{2}). There were 649 housing units at an average density of 475.4 per square mile (183.6/km^{2}). The racial makeup of the village was 95.04% White, 2.26% African American, 0.45% Native American, 0.08% Asian, 0.75% from other races, and 1.43% from two or more races. Hispanic or Latino of any race were 1.73% of the population.

There were 564 households, out of which 35.3% had children under the age of 18 living with them, 47.9% were married couples living together, 14.5% had a female householder with no husband present, and 34.8% were non-families. 28.4% of all households were made up of individuals, and 10.5% had someone living alone who was 65 years of age or older. The average household size was 2.36 and the average family size was 2.91.

In the village, the population was spread out, with 26.3% under the age of 18, 13.4% from 18 to 24, 32.0% from 25 to 44, 17.7% from 45 to 64, and 10.7% who were 65 years of age or older. The median age was 30 years. For every 100 females, there were 91.9 males. For every 100 females age 18 and over, there were 86.0 males.

The median income for a household in the village was $25,870, and the median income for a family was $34,688. Males had a median income of $27,262 versus $20,750 for females. The per capita income for the village was $12,913. About 18.7% of families and 23.2% of the population were below the poverty line, including 25.4% of those under age 18 and 25.0% of those age 65 or over.

=== Education ===
73.7% of the total village population has their high school diploma or equivalent. This is below the national average of 80.4%. The percentage of the total population that holds a bachelor's degree or above is also below the national average of 24.4%. Only 12.9% of citizens hold college level degrees.

== Government ==
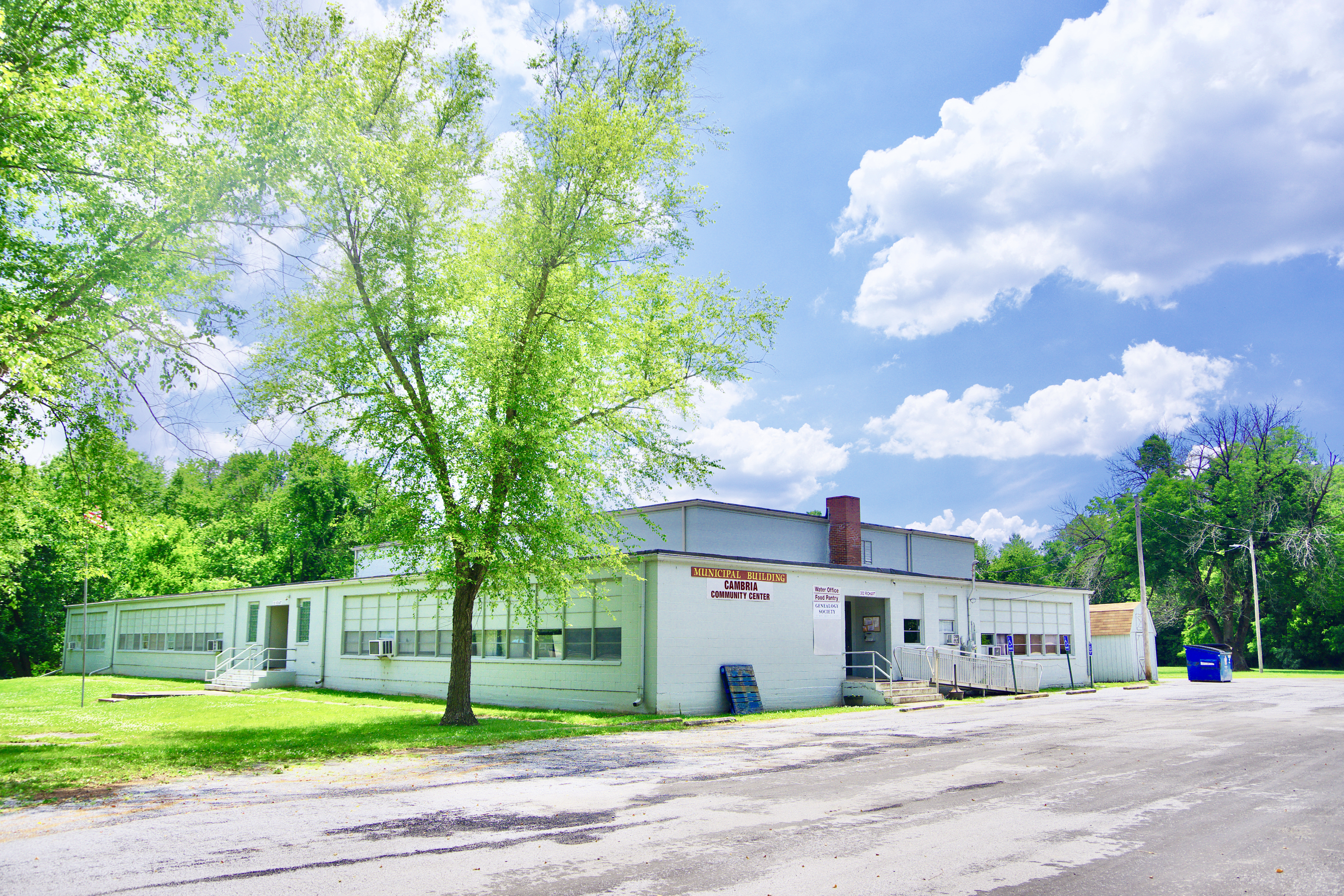
Cambria Municipal Building

Village board meetings are held every first and third Tuesday of the month at the Cambria Village Hall located in the old Cambria Grade School.

== Education ==
Cambria is located in the Carterville School District Unit 5. The Cambria Grade School closed in 2001 when the Tri-C communities of Carterville, Cambria, and Crainville consolidated all Kindergarten through middle school grade levels.

Cambria is located near John A. Logan College located in Carterville and Southern Illinois University Carbondale.

== Notable person ==
- Luther Harvel, outfielder for the Cleveland Indians
