= Del Ennis =

American baseball player (1925–1996)

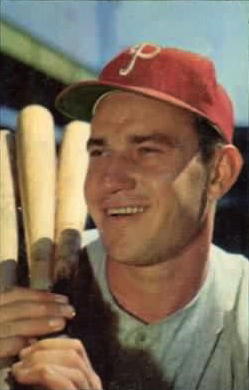
- Ennis in 1953
- Outfielder
- Born: June 8, 1925; Philadelphia, Pennsylvania, U.S.
- Died: February 8, 1996 (aged 70); Huntingdon Valley, Pennsylvania, U.S.
- Batted: Right Threw: Right

MLB debut
- April 28, 1946, for the Philadelphia Phillies

Last MLB appearance
- June 14, 1959, for the Chicago White Sox

MLB statistics
- Batting average: .284
- Hits: 2,063
- Home runs: 288
- Runs batted in: 1,284
- Stats at Baseball Reference

Teams
- Philadelphia Phillies (1946–1956); St. Louis Cardinals (1957–1958); Cincinnati Reds (1959); Chicago White Sox (1959)

Career highlights and awards
- 3× All-Star (1946, 1951, 1955); NL RBI leader (1950); Philadelphia Phillies Wall of Fame

Delmer Ennis (June 8, 1925 – February 8, 1996) was an American professional baseball outfielder, who played in Major League Baseball (MLB) from 1946 to 1959 for the Philadelphia Phillies, St. Louis Cardinals, Cincinnati Reds, and Chicago White Sox. From 1949 to 1957, he accumulated more runs batted in (RBI) than anyone besides Stan Musial and was eighth in the National League (NL) in home runs. In 1950, Ennis led the NL with 126 RBI as the Phillies won their first pennant in 35 years. He held the Phillies career record of 259 home runs from 1956 to 1980, and ranked 10th in National League history with 1,824 games in the outfield, when his career ended.

== Early life and military service ==
Ennis was born to George and Agnes Ennis in the Crescentville section of Philadelphia. He played baseball and football at Olney High School and was mentioned as an all-state fullback. The Philadelphia Phillies scout Jocko Collins came to watch one of Ennis's high school classmates pitch. When Ennis hit two long home runs, Collins tried to recruit him but Ennis was hesitant, worried that he was not ready, and unsure that he wanted to pursue a baseball career. In August 1942, Ennis signed with Collins to play with the Phillies' Canadian–American League team, but the league suspended operations for World War II. Ennis signed with Collins again in March 1943, and hit .348 with 19 home runs and 16 triples for the Phillies' Trenton, New Jersey Interstate League team. In September 1943, Philadelphia wanted to call Ennis to the major leagues, but he went into the United States Navy instead. Ennis saw military action in the Pacific Theater and also toured with a baseball team that included Billy Herman, Johnny Vander Meer and Schoolboy Rowe.

Ennis joined the United States Navy on September 29, 1943, and was assigned to Sampson Naval Training Station, New York, where he graduated as a signalman from "A" school at Sampson and then posted to the Hawaiian Sea Frontier. When the Navy learned that Ennis was associated with the Phillies, they assumed he was a major leaguer and invited him to fill one of the vacancies while in Honolulu. He was included on the Navy's Western PAC Tour of many Pacific Islands in 1944–1945. Ennis looked very good at the plate in the few exhibition games which immediately preceded the tours. His slugging prompted Dan Topping, new owner of the New York Yankees and a fellow serviceman at Pearl Harbor, to offer him $25,000 to sign with the Yanks. The Phillies had paid Ennis only $50 to sign.

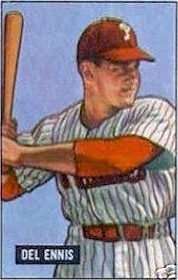
Ennis' 1951 Bowman Gum baseball card

Ennis' naval rank was Petty Officer Third Class. Most of his service was on the island of Guam after the winter tour. Playing with and against major leaguers on the tours was equivalent of a minor league apprenticeship for Ennis. After the tours, he was assigned to a fleet recreation billet at Gab Gab Beach on Guam and stayed on the island for one year. He did not make it back to the States as soon as some of the others because he did not have enough points built up. He returned stateside through San Diego on the USS Wakefield. Ennis was discharged from the Navy on April 5, 1946, and joined the major league Phillies about a week later.

== Philadelphia Phillies ==
Player-manager Ben Chapman delayed Ennis's debut since he had missed spring training, and then had him pinch-hit on April 28 against the Boston Braves – a groundout to shortstop. Chapman gave Ennis the starting job in left field, a weak spot in the Phillies lineup. On May 5, Ennis hit his first home run – a three-run shot in the first inning – and then his second, both in the second game of a doubleheader. His favorite moment was on Del's birthday, June 8, 1946, hitting a single to break up a perfect game with only four outs remaining against Red Barrett. Barrett of the Boston Braves had retired 22 batters in a row before Ennis' single. Olney residents held a Del Ennis Night at Shibe Park with 36,356 in attendance and an estimated 20,000 were turned away. Ennis singled with the bases loaded to drive in two runs in the first inning against the Cardinals and the Phillies won. His average raised over .300 until a slump in July.

In his early career, Ennis was noted not only for his home runs, runs batted in and hard line drives, but also good outfield play and fast, hard baserunning. Eleven weeks after his debut, Ennis became the first Phillies rookie to make an All-Star team on the strength of a strong throwing arm and lively bat. He also became the first ever Sporting News Rookie Award winner, and finished eighth in the Most Valuable Player Award voting after batting .313 with 17 home runs and 73 RBI and placing second in the National League in slugging average (.485) behind Musial.

Ennis showed his power in 1948, driving in 95 runs with 30 home runs – a Phillies record for right-handed hitters, breaking Gavvy Cravath's 1915 total of 24. A year later, he hit .302 with 25 homers and 110 RBI, finishing second in the National League in doubles both seasons. But his most productive season came in 1950, when he hit .311 with career highs of 31 home runs and a league-best 126 RBI. The 31 home runs were the team record for right-handed hitters until teammate Stan Lopata hit 32 in 1956. As a member of the 1950 team dubbed the "Whiz Kids", Ennis helped the Phillies to win their first pennant since 1915 in a finish that saw Philadelphia beat out the Brooklyn Dodgers on the last day of the season, only to be swept in the World Series by the New York Yankees, with Ennis hitting only .143 with no RBI. Ennis placed fourth in the Most Valuable Player Award voting, won by teammate Jim Konstanty.

From 1952 to 1955, Ennis collected four 20+ home run, 100+ RBI seasons, with highs of 29 and 125 in 1953. He was also named to three All-Star games, in 1946, 1951 and 1955. In 1956, he passed Chuck Klein to become the Phillies all-time home run leader, holding the record until Mike Schmidt passed him in 1980. On August 25, 1955, before a doubleheader with St. Louis, the Phillies honored Ennis for driving in more runs at that point than any player in team history. Ennis was presented with gifts including a Cadillac, TV, air conditioner, freezer, diamond ring, and fishing outfit. The Phillies won both games with Ennis adding four RBI to his record total.

The Philadelphia native became the first Phillies player in the modern era to reach 1,000 runs batted in on August 9, 1955. Connie Mack Stadium was sold out for Del Ennis Night later that month (38,545). Ennis’ 259 home runs with the Phillies rank third in franchise history behind Mike Schmidt (548) and Ryan Howard (382). His 1,124 RBIs rank third among modern Phillies behind only Schmidt (1,595) and Howard (1,194). No wonder Phillies broadcasters Gene Kelly and By Saam said, “It’s Ding Dong Del” or “Here comes Ennis the Menace” whenever he stepped to the plate, according to SABR.org.

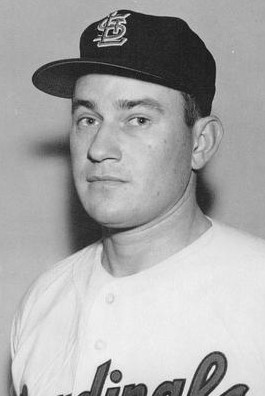
Ennis with the St. Louis Cardinals in 1957

== Late career ==
In 1956, he broke Ed Delahanty's record of 1,544 games with the Phillies. By the end of the 1956 season, he was also among the National League's top ten career home run leaders, though he dropped out of the top ten before his career ended. Traded to the St. Louis Cardinals before the 1957 season for Rip Repulski, Ennis responded with a .286 average, 26 home runs and 105 RBI, finishing second in the league behind his teammate and roommate on the road Stan Musial. But his production dropped off sharply in 1958, and after two years in St. Louis he finished his career in 1959 playing for the Cincinnati Reds and the pennant-winning Chicago White Sox. Despite hitting 12 home runs and driving in 35 runs batted in during spring training for Cincinnati in 1959, Ennis was traded to the Chicago White Sox on May 1 for pitcher Don Rudolph and outfielder Lou Skizas.

In a 14-season career, Ennis compiled a .284 batting average with 288 home runs, 2,063 hits, 1,284 RBI and 985 runs in 1,903 games. Defensively, Ennis recorded a career .969 fielding percentage.

The story of Ennis and the abuse he endured from Philadelphia fans has obscured his impressive statistics and also his memory. Oft noted was the fans' animosity beginning with a slump year in 1951. Despite turning the record around later, the fans were merciless. As an example, in the second game of a doubleheader against the Cardinals on July 31, 1954, in the top of the third inning, Ennis dropped an outfield fly with the bases loaded and all three runners scored. As Phillies' pitcher Steve Ridzik later remarked, "We had a packed house and the fans start to boo him unmercifully. It was terrible. The next inning when he went out to left field they booed and booed and booed. They booed him when he ran off the field at the end of the inning. . . .Here he is ... a hometown guy and everything. . . . He came to bat in the last of the eighth inning with the score still tied and two outs. The fans just booed and booed and all our guys on the bench are just hotter than a pistol. We were ready to fight the thirty-some thousand." In the bottom half of the same inning with two on and two out, he hit the first pitch on the roof in left field at Connie Mack Stadium, and the Phillies won the game by a score of 6–5.

Ennis' career ended with a mid-season release by the White Sox in 1959, after having been acquired from Cincinnati during the first week of the 1959 season. On May 1, he was traded to the White Sox, managed by Al López, where Ennis became the starting left fielder throughout May into early June 1959. In the first 11 games with the White Sox, Ennis drove in seven runs including a game-winner in mid-May at Yankee Stadium. Ennis had four game-winning hits in six games in early 1959 and the White Sox went on to win the AL pennant. However, Ennis was not with the team that played the Dodgers in the 1959 World Series, although he was voted a one-fourth WS share. To make room on the roster for Norm Cash, who had completed a military commitment, Ennis was waived by the Sox in mid-June 1959, ending a career spanning 14 seasons.

His defensive replacement for the White Sox in that period was Johnny Callison, who later was traded to and starred with the Phillies.

With Chicago, Ennis batted .219, with 2 home runs, 7 runs batted in with 96 at bats. The White Sox released Ennis on June 20. They called up Jim McAnany to play right field and moved Al Smith from right field to left field for the balance of the season. With personal problems in his family, Ennis needed to return to Philadelphia.

== Later life ==
Following his retirement as a player, Ennis operated a bowling alley named Del Ennis Lanes in Huntingdon Valley, Pennsylvania, with the former traveling secretary of the Phillies, John Wise. He also bred greyhound race dogs. Ennis also spent a year coaching baseball at Penn State University's Abington Campus (formerly Ogontz campus). He remembered his 1950 Phillies days in his sports enterprise, calling three dogs scheduled to run in Florida racetracks Whiz Kids Ennis, Whiz Kids Ashburn and Whiz Kids Roberts. In 1983, during the franchise's 100th anniversary year, he was named to the Philadelphia Phillies Centennial Team. There is now a plaque on the Phillies Wall of Fame at the team's ballpark honoring the career of Ennis as a Whiz Kid.

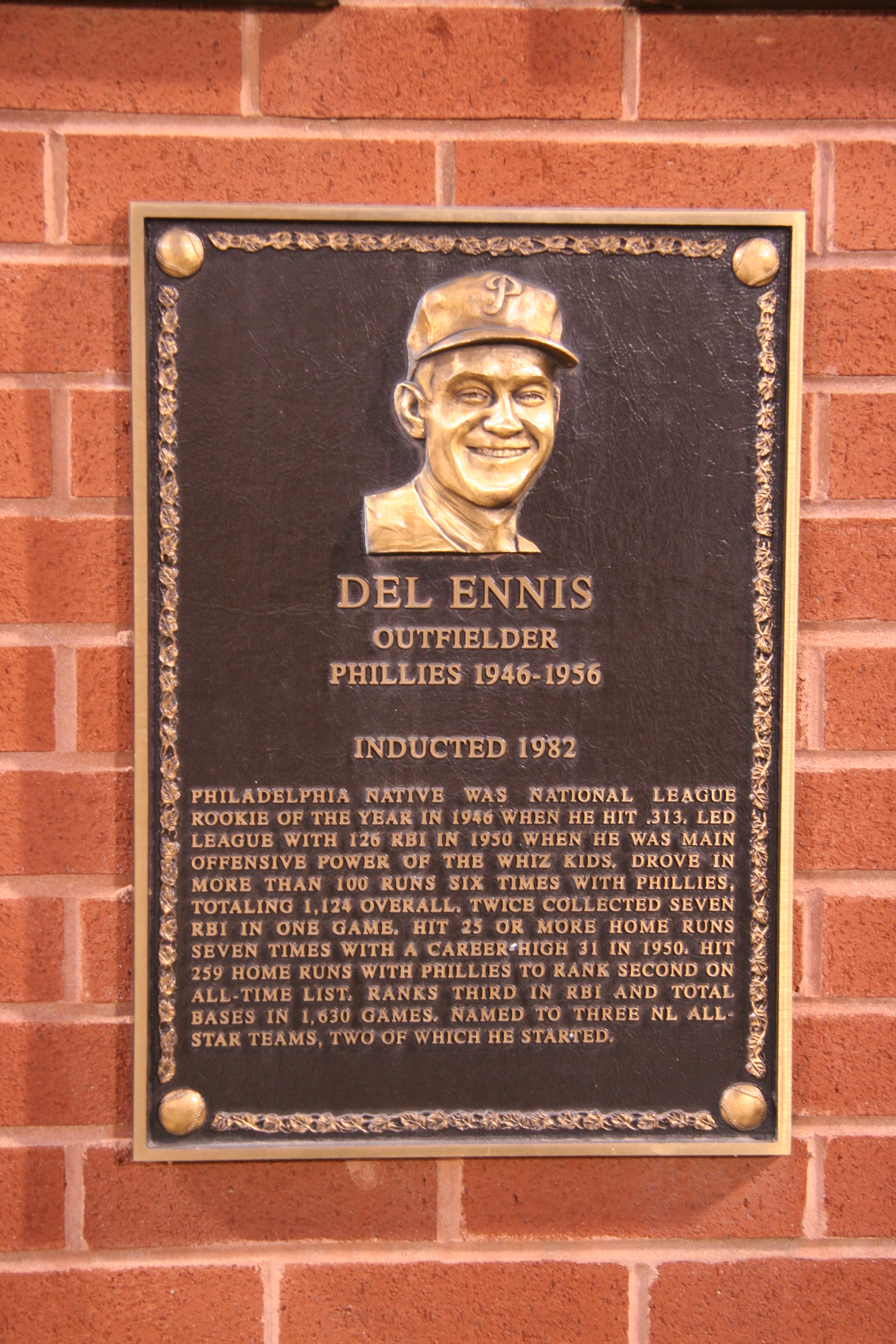
Ennis was inducted into the Philadelphia Baseball Wall of Fame.

Ennis died in Huntingdon Valley, Pennsylvania, at age 70 from complications from diabetes. He was buried in Hillside Cemetery, Roslyn, Pennsylvania.

== See also ==
- List of Major League Baseball career hits leaders
- List of Major League Baseball career home run leaders
- List of Major League Baseball career runs batted in leaders
- List of Major League Baseball annual runs batted in leaders
