= Les Pearson (baseball) =

American baseball player

- Outfielder
- Born: June 27, 1909; East St. Louis, Illinois, U.S.
- Died: April 9, 1986 (aged 76); Los Angeles, California, U.S.

Negro league baseball debut
- 1937, for the St. Louis Stars

Last appearance
- 1937, for the St. Louis Stars
- Stats at Baseball Reference

Teams
- St. Louis Stars (1937)

Lester Pearson (June 27, 1909 – April 9, 1986) was an American Negro league baseball outfielder in the 1930s.

A native of East St. Louis, Illinois, Pearson attended Lincoln University of Missouri and played for the St. Louis Stars in 1937. In 26 recorded games, he posted 34 hits with two home runs and 18 RBI in 120 plate appearances. Pearson died in Los Angeles, California in 1986 at age 76.
