= Fox Blevins =

American baseball player

- Third baseman
- Born: June 4, 1910; San Antonio, Texas, U.S.
- Died: February 14, 1986 (aged 75); Contra Costa, California, U.S.
- Batted: Right Threw: Right

Negro league baseball debut
- 1932, for the Little Rock Grays

Last appearance
- 1936, for the Homestead Grays
- Stats at Baseball Reference

Teams
- Little Rock Grays (1932); Homestead Grays (1936)

Clabron Howard Blevins (June 4, 1910 – February 14, 1986) was an American professional baseball third baseman in the Negro leagues. He played with the Little Rock Grays in 1932 and the Homestead Grays in 1936. He also played with the Oakland Larks of the West Coast Baseball League in 1946.
