= Jocko Collins =

Former MLB scout and NBA referee

John P. ("Jocko") Collins (November 13, 1905 – March 2, 1986) was a professional basketball referee, and a baseball scout for the Philadelphia Phillies, San Francisco Giants, Houston Astros, Baltimore Orioles, New York Mets, and Milwaukee Brewers. He was supervisor of officials for the National Basketball Association (NBA) for 12 years, until he was fired in 1961. As a baseball scout, he was credited with finding and signing players (and future executives) such as Del Ennis, Tommy Lasorda, Dallas Green, Bob Bailor, Dick Allen, and Dave May.

Collins was born in New York City and raised in the Port Richmond neighborhood of Philadelphia. He attended Saint Joseph's Preparatory School and Saint Joseph's College, where he was captain of the baseball and basketball teams and graduated in 1927. He also served as a high school basketball coach and scouted for the Philadelphia 76ers of the NBA. He died in Philadelphia in 1986 at the age of 80.
