= Luther Harvel =

American baseball player (1905–1986)

Luther "Red" Harvel
- Center fielder
- Born: September 30, 1905; Cambria, Illinois, U.S.
- Died: April 10, 1986 (aged 80); Kansas City, Missouri, U.S.
- Batted: Right Threw: Right

MLB debut
- July 31, 1928, for the Cleveland Indians

Last MLB appearance
- September 25, 1928, for the Cleveland Indians

MLB statistics
- Batting average: .221
- Home runs: 0
- Runs batted in: 12
- Stats at Baseball Reference

Teams
- Cleveland Indians (1928)

Luther Raymond Harvel (September 30, 1905 – April 10, 1986), nicknamed "Red", was an American professional baseball player, scout and manager. Born in Cambria, Illinois, he spent almost 50 years in baseball, his career stretching from 1926 into the 1970s. A center fielder during his active career, he threw and batted right-handed, was 5 feet 11 inches (1.80 m) tall and weighed 180 pounds (82 kg). He appeared in 40 games in Major League Baseball for the 1928 Cleveland Indians, getting into 40 games from July 31st on, including 39 in center.

Luther spent most of 1928 at Omaha, hitting .352. He played 13 years in the minors and also managed five seasons. During his 1928 MLB stint — all but one game of which occurred in August and September of that season — Harvel collected 30 hits in 136 at bats, with six doubles and one triple.

Harvel was later a scout for the Kansas City/Oakland A's (1967-1968), Cleveland Indians (1969-1970), Los Angeles Dodgers (1971-1972), and A's again (1973-1974).

He died on 10 April 1986, in Kansas City, Jackson, Missouri, United States, at the age of 80.
