= Philadelphia Phillies all-time roster =

List of baseball players

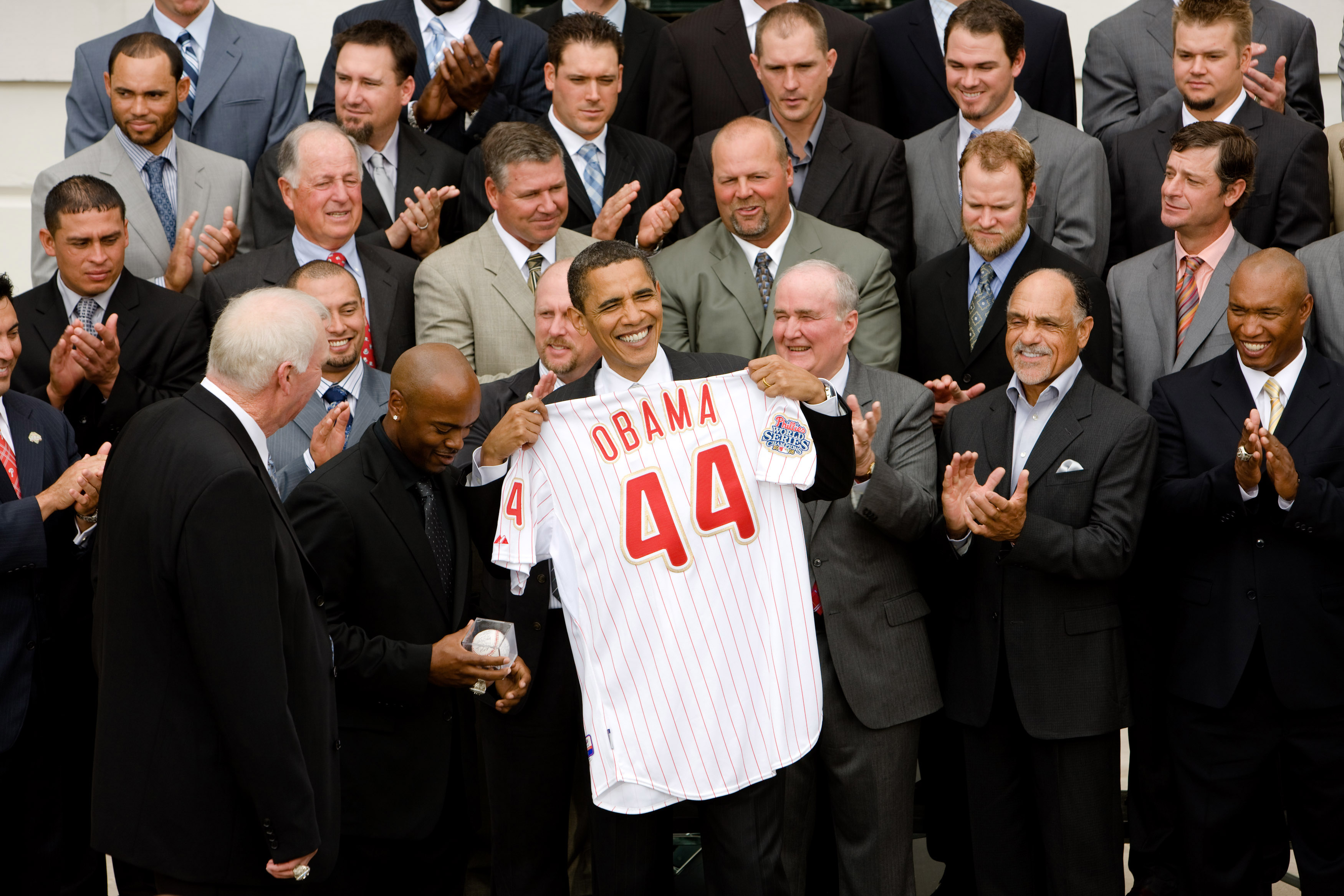
The 2008 Philadelphia Phillies, pictured here with former President Barack Obama, defeated the Tampa Bay Rays to win the franchise's second World Series championship; 40 players represented the Phillies during that season.

The Philadelphia Phillies are a Major League Baseball team based in Philadelphia, Pennsylvania. They are a member of the Eastern Division of Major League Baseball's National League. The team has played officially under two names since beginning play in 1883: the current moniker, as well as the "Quakers", which was used in conjunction with "Phillies" during the team's early history. The team was also known unofficially as the "Blue Jays" during the World War II era. Since the franchise's inception, 2,081 players have made an appearance in a competitive game for the team, whether as an offensive player (batting and baserunning) or a defensive player (fielding, pitching, or both).

Thirty-three players in Phillies history have been inducted into the Baseball Hall of Fame. Those players for whom the Hall recognizes the Phillies as their primary team include Grover Cleveland Alexander, Richie Ashburn, Dave Bancroft, Steve Carlton, Ed Delahanty, Billy Hamilton, Chuck Klein, Robin Roberts, Mike Schmidt, and Sam Thompson; manager Harry Wright was also inducted for his contributions with the club. The Phillies have retired numbers for seven players, including Schmidt (#20), Carlton (#32), Ashburn (#1), Roberts (#36), Allen (#15), Halladay (#34), and Jim Bunning (#14); the eighth retired number is Jackie Robinson's #42, which was retired throughout baseball in 1997. The Phillies also honor two additional players with the letter "P" in the manner of a retired number: Alexander played before numbers were used in the major leagues; and Klein wore a variety of numbers in his Phillies career.

Forty Phillies players have been elected to the Philadelphia Baseball Wall of Fame. All of the players listed above (save Robinson) have been elected; also included are Bobby Abreu, Dick Allen, Bob Boone, Larry Bowa, Pat Burrell, Johnny Callison, Gavvy Cravath, Darren Daulton, Del Ennis, Jimmie Foxx, Dallas Green, Granny Hamner, Willie Jones, John Kruk, Mike Lieberthal, Greg Luzinski, Garry Maddox, Sherry Magee, Tug McGraw, Juan Samuel, Curt Schilling, Bobby Shantz, Chris Short, Curt Simmons, Tony Taylor, Jim Thome, Manny Trillo, John Vukovich, and Cy Williams. Foxx and Shantz were inducted for their contributions as members of the Philadelphia Athletics. Four non-players are also members of the Wall of Fame for their contributions to the Phillies: team executive Paul Owens, broadcaster Harry Kalas, manager Charlie Manuel and general manager Pat Gillick.

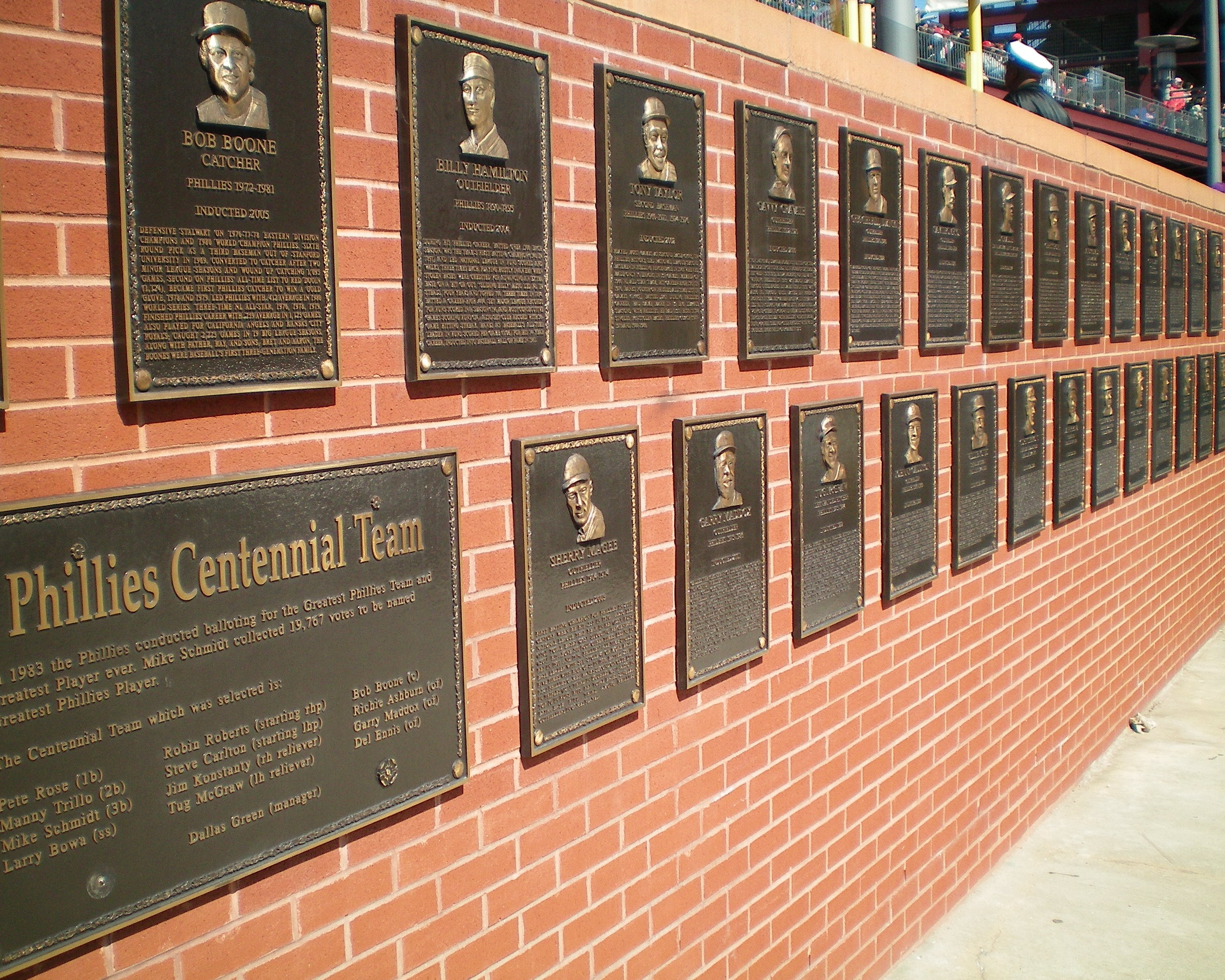
One Phillies player or team figure has been inducted into the Philadelphia Baseball Wall of Fame annually since 1978.

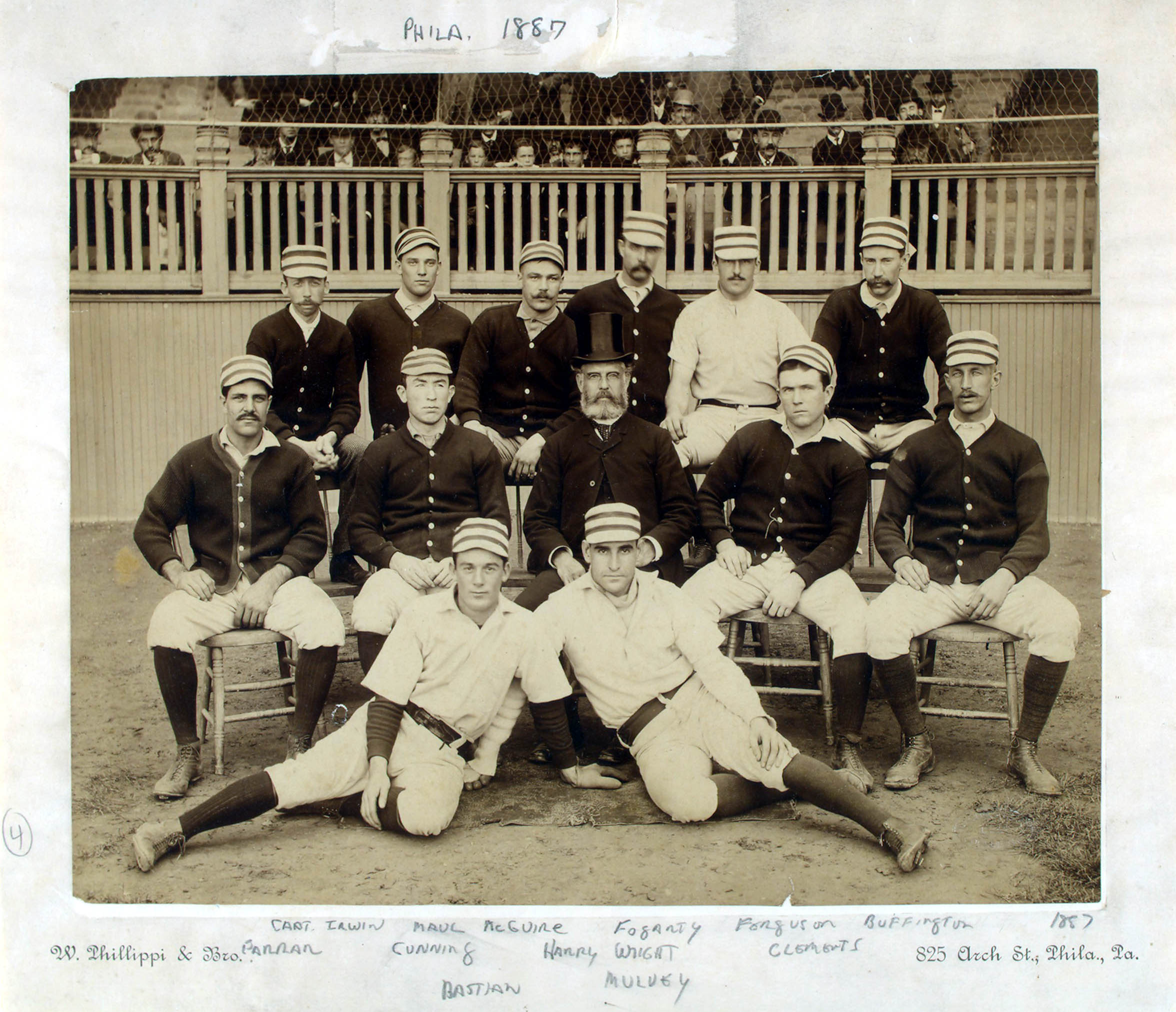
The 1887 Phillies began to play at Baker Bowl, their long-term home, after four years playing in Recreation Park.

Key to abbreviations in column headers
Bat	Number of batters^{[a]}
Pitch	Number of pitchers
HoF	Number of members of the National Baseball Hall of Fame and Museum
WoF	Number of members of the Philadelphia Baseball Wall of Fame
Ret #	Number of players for whom a number has been retired

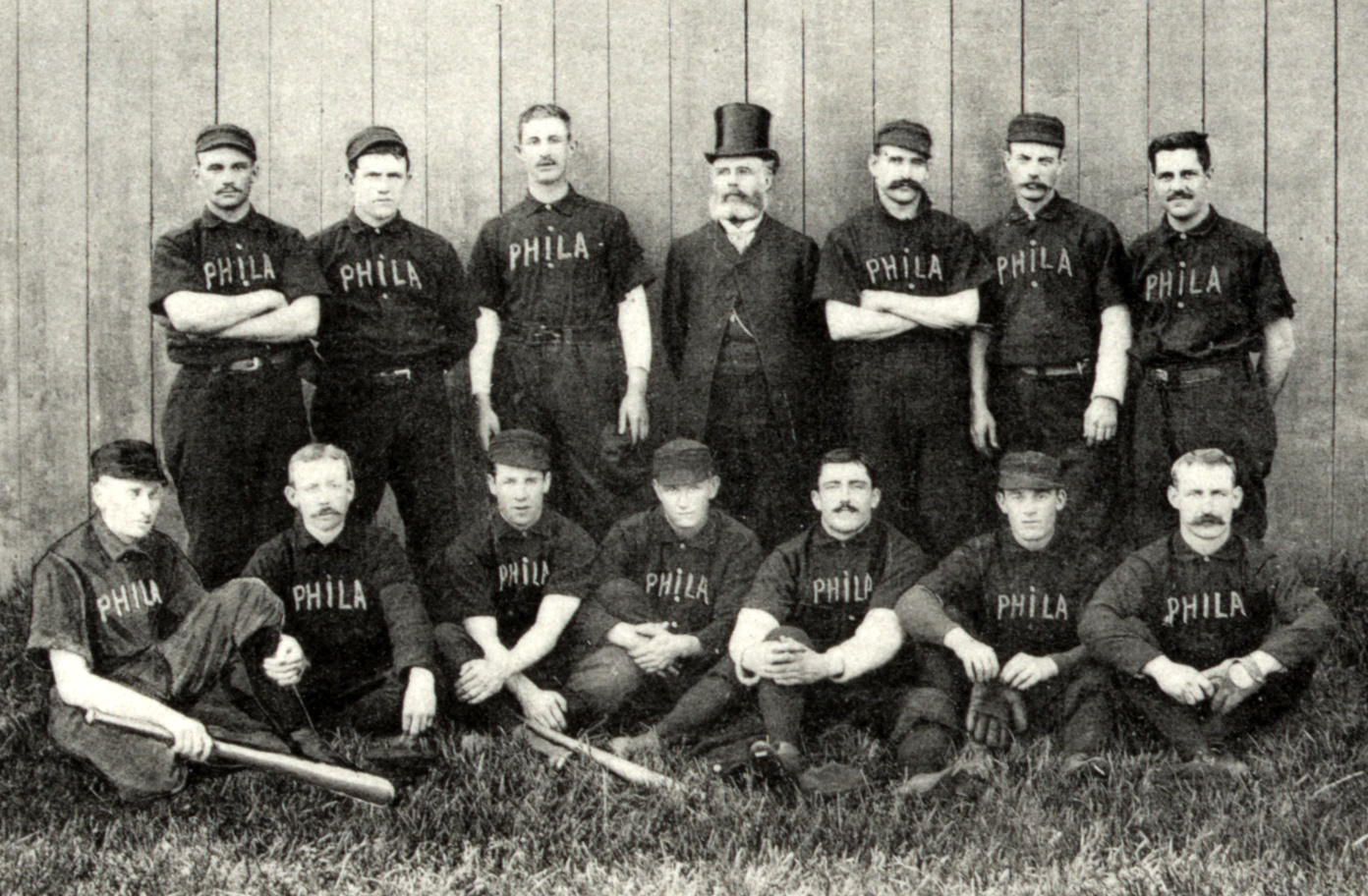
The 1888 Phillies, sometimes known as the "Quakers", were skippered by manager Harry Wright (back row, center).

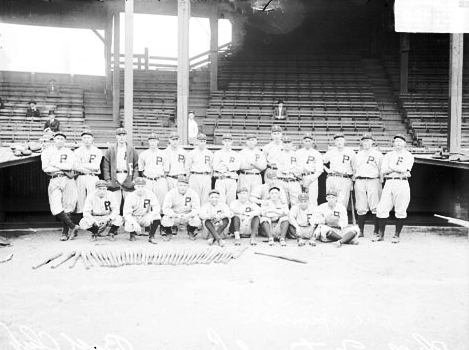
The 1915 Phillies made the franchise's first World Series appearance, led by Wall of Fame outfielder Gavvy Cravath and Hall of Fame pitcher Grover Cleveland Alexander.

List of letters, showing the number of players whose surnames start with each letter and who meet various qualifications
Letter	Players	Bat	Pitch	HoF	WoF	Ret #
A	51	34	17	3	2	2
B	180	95	85	4	4	1
C	143^{[C]}	78	66	2	3	1
D	100^{[D]}	60	40	2	2	0
E	32	16	16	1	1	0
F	79^{[F]}	43	38	2	1	0
G	82^{[G]}	50	33	0	1	0
H	133^{[H]}	73	62	1	2	0
I	10	7	3	0	0	0
J	57	27	30	2	1	0
K	68	32	36	2	2	1
L	101^{[L]}	56	46	1	1	0
M	202^{[M]}	115	89	2	3	0
N	33^{[N]}	17	17	1	0	0
O	26	15	11	0	0	0
P	88	45	43	1	0	0
Q	5	2	3	0	0	0
R	97	49	48	2	1	1
S	187^{[S]}	99	90	3	5	1
T	58	36	22	1	2	0
U	6	3	3	0	0	0
V	24	15	9	0	2	0
W	114^{[W]}	60	55	3	1	0
X	0	—	—	—	—	—
Y	8	6	2	0	0	0
Z	7	4	3	0	0	0
Total	2,081	1,037	871	32	32	8^{[‡]}

== See also ==
- List of Philadelphia Phillies managers
- List of Philadelphia Phillies broadcasters

== Footnotes ==
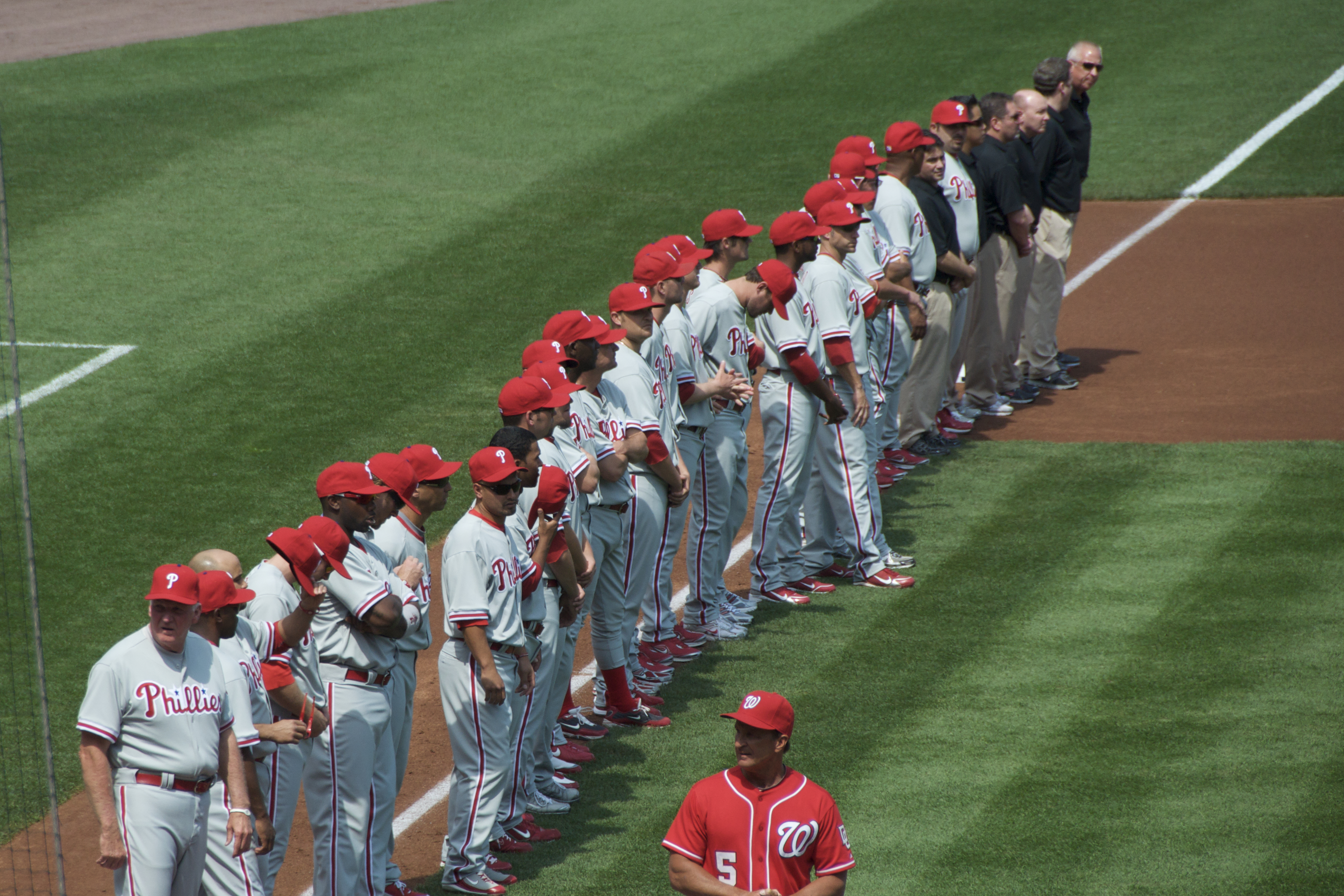
The 2010 Phillies amassed Major League Baseball's best win–loss record for the first time in franchise history.

Key

- ^{a} For the purpose of this list, all non-pitching positions, including pinch hitters and pinch runners, are included in this tally.

Table

- ^{C} One player, Bert Conn, was both a pitcher and a second baseman.
- ^{D} One player, Ed Daily, was both a pitcher and an outfielder.
- ^{F} Two Phillies played as pitchers and position players; Harry Felix was both a pitcher and a third baseman, and Patsy Flaherty played center field in addition to pitching.
- ^{G} One player, Kid Gleason, was both a pitcher and a second baseman.
- ^{H} Two Phillies played as pitchers and position players; Bill Harman was both a catcher and a pitcher, and Hardie Henderson played left field in addition to pitching.
- ^{L} One player, Johnny Lush, was both a pitcher and a first baseman.
- ^{M} Two Phillies played as pitchers and position players; Al Maul was both a left fielder and a pitcher, and Elmer Miller played right field in addition to pitching.
- ^{N} One player, Jack Neagle, was both a pitcher and a left fielder.
- ^{S} Two Phillies played as pitchers and position players; Edgar Smith was both a left fielder and a pitcher, and John Strike played right field in addition to pitching.
- ^{W} One player, Bucky Walters, was both a pitcher and a third baseman.
- ^{‡} The eighth retired number is 42, retired throughout Major League Baseball in honor of Jackie Robinson.
