= Philadelphia Phillies all-time roster (I–J) =

List of baseball players

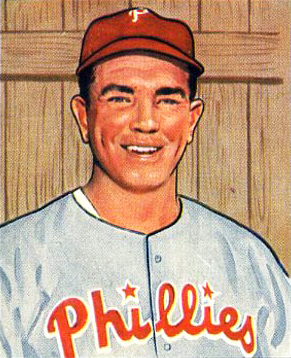
Philadelphia Baseball Wall of Fame member Willie "Puddin' Head" Jones hit 180 home runs and batted in 753 runs in a 13-season career with the Phillies.

The Philadelphia Phillies are a Major League Baseball team based in Philadelphia, Pennsylvania. They are a member of the Eastern Division of Major League Baseball's National League. The team has played officially under two names since beginning play in 1883: the current moniker, as well as the "Quakers", which was used in conjunction with "Phillies" during the team's early history. The team was also known unofficially as the "Blue Jays" during the World War II era. Since the franchise's inception, 2,081 players have made an appearance in a competitive game for the team, whether as an offensive player (batting and baserunning) or a defensive player (fielding, pitching, or both).

Of those 2,081 Phillies, 10 have had surnames beginning with the letter I, and 57 beginning with the letter J. Two members of this list have been inducted into the Baseball Hall of Fame: pitcher Ferguson Jenkins, who played two seasons with Philadelphia before joining the Chicago Cubs; and first baseman Hughie Jennings, whose tenure with the Phillies encompassed the 1901 and 1902 seasons. One list member was also elected to the Philadelphia Baseball Wall of Fame; Willie "Puddin' Head" Jones was the starting third baseman for the Whiz Kids during his 13 seasons with the team.

Among the 34 batters in this list, Orlando Isales has the highest batting average, at .400; he collected two hits in five at-bats during the Phillies' 1980 championship season. Other players with an average over .300 include Tadahito Iguchi (.303 in one season); and Jay Johnstone (.303 in five seasons), who has the highest mark among the players whose surnames begin with J. Jones leads all players on this list with 180 home runs and 753 runs batted in (RBI). Raúl Ibañez leads the I-named players with 70 home runs and 260 RBI.

Of this list's 33 pitchers, two share the best win–loss record, in terms of winning percentage: Alex Jones won one game and lost none; and Eric Junge collected a 2–0 record in two seasons with Philadelphia. Larry Jackson leads all pitchers in this list with 41 victories, while Syl Johnson's 51 defeats are the highest total in that category. Jackson's 373 strikeouts are the best total of any pitcher in this list. Among the pitchers whose names begin with I, Ham Iburg leads in wins (11), losses (18), winning percentage (.379), and strikeouts (106).

Key to symbols in player list(s)
† or ‡	Indicates a member of the National Baseball Hall of Fame and Museum; ‡ indicates that the Phillies are the player's primary team^{[H]}
§	Indicates a member of the Philadelphia Baseball Wall of Fame
*	Indicates a team record^{[R]}
(#)	A number following a player's name indicates that the number was retired by the Phillies in the player's honor.
Year	Italic text indicates that the player is a member of the Phillies' active (25-man) roster.
Position(s)	Indicates the player's primary position(s)^{[P]}
Notes	Statistics shown only for playing time with Phillies^{[S]}
Ref	References

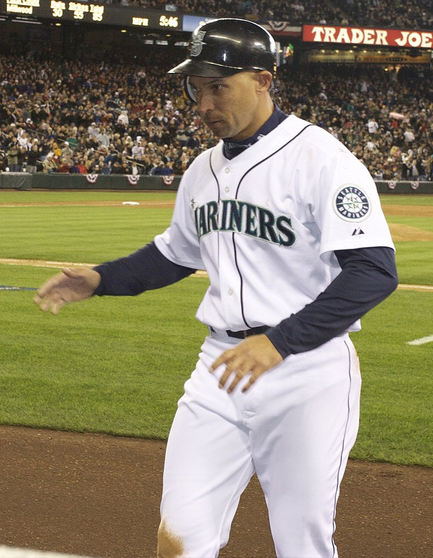
Raúl Ibañez hit 50 home runs in his first two seasons with Philadelphia.

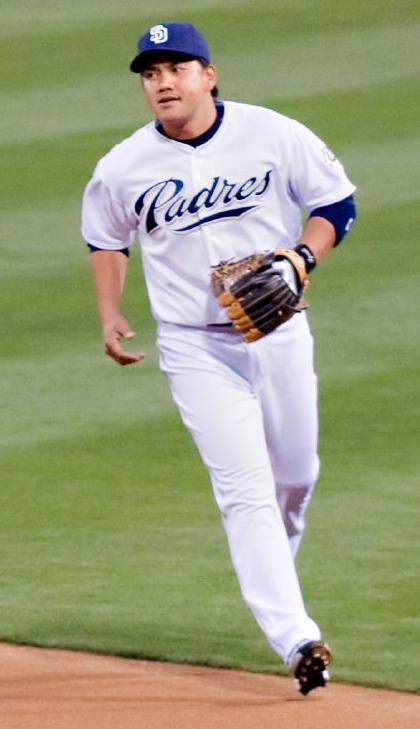
Japanese second baseman Tadahito Iguchi was the first Asian-born Phillie in franchise history.

List of players whose surnames begin with I, showing season(s) and position(s) played and selected statistics
Name	Season(s)	Position(s)	Notes	Ref
Raúl Ibañez	2009–2011	Left fielder	.264 batting average; 70 home runs; 260 runs batted in	
Ham Iburg	1902	Pitcher	11–18 record; 3.89 earned run average; 106 strikeouts	
Tadahito Iguchi	2007–2008	Second baseman	.303 batting average; 3 home runs; 12 runs batted in	
Doc Imlay	1913	Pitcher	7.24 earned run average; 7 strikeouts; 7 walks	
Pete Incaviglia	1993–1994; 1996	Left fielder	.250 batting average; 53 home runs; 163 runs batted in	
Bert Inks	1896	Pitcher	0–1 record; 7.84 earned run average; 2 strikeouts	
Dane Iorg	1977	First baseman	.167 batting average; 1 double; 2 runs batted in	
Hal Irelan	1914	Second baseman	.236 batting average; 1 home run; 16 runs batted in	
Arthur Irwin	1886–1889; 1894	Shortstop	.233 batting average; 18 triples; 128 runs batted in	
Orlando Isales	1980	Right fielder	.400 batting average; 1 triple; 3 runs batted in	

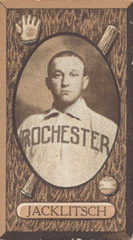
As a catcher, Fred Jacklitsch played for the Phillies from 1900 to 1902, and again from 1907 to 1910.

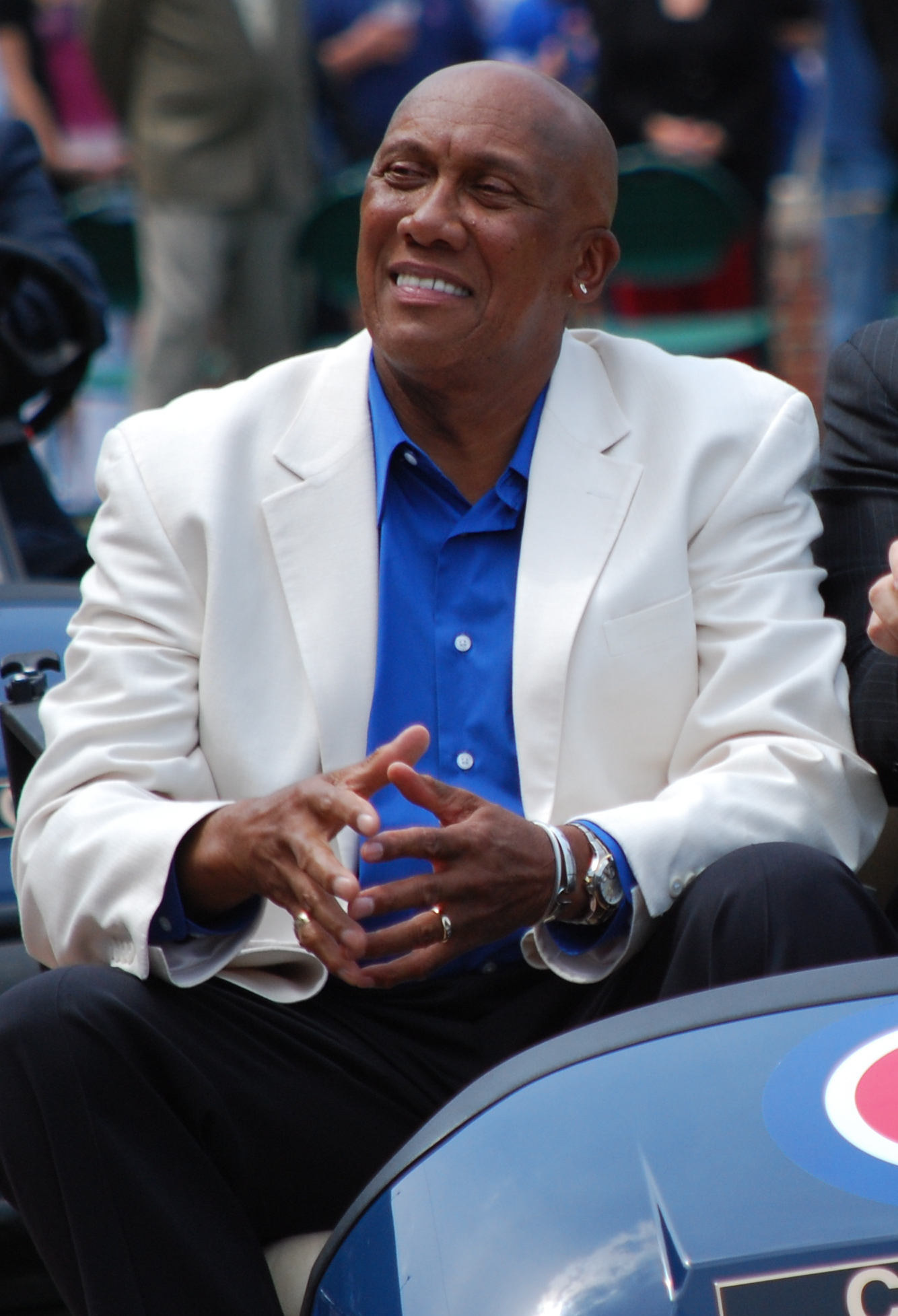
Hall of Fame pitcher Ferguson Jenkins began his career with the Phillies in 1965.

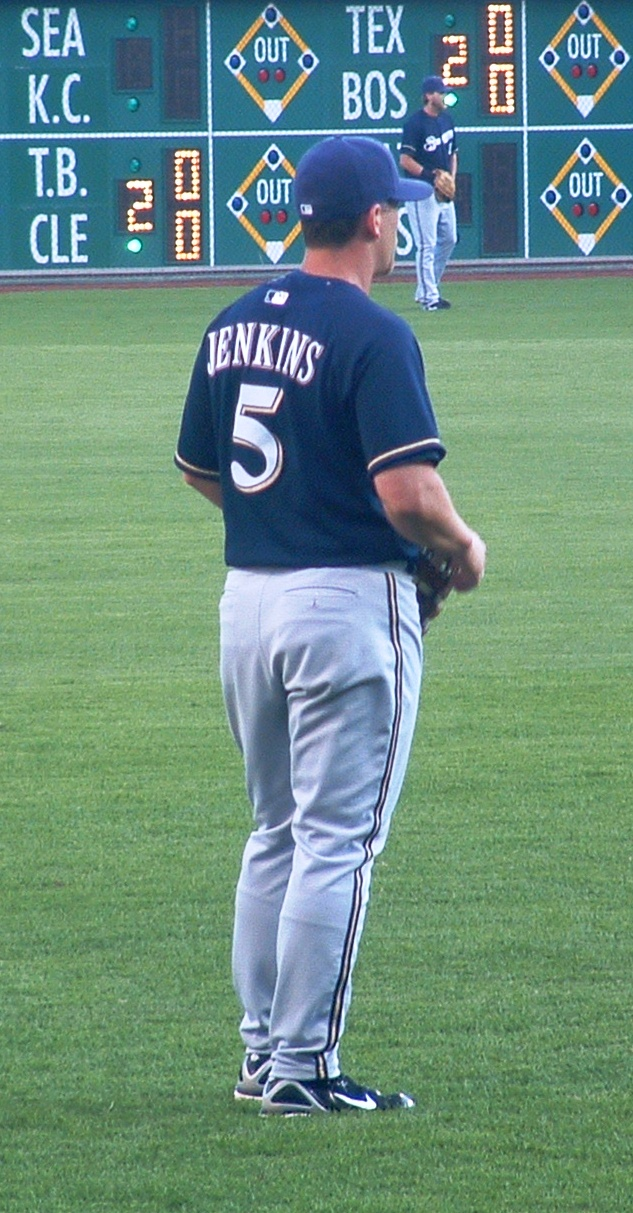
Geoff Jenkins hit nine home runs in his only season with Philadelphia.

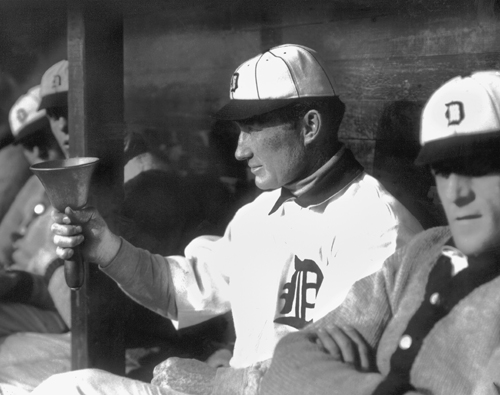
Hall of Famer and first baseman Hughie Jennings played two seasons for the Phillies.

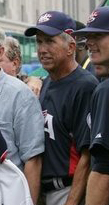
Davey Johnson managed the United States national baseball team at the 2008 Summer Olympics and in the 2009 World Baseball Classic.

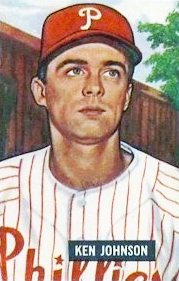
Ken Johnson amassed a 9–9 record in his two Philadelphia seasons.

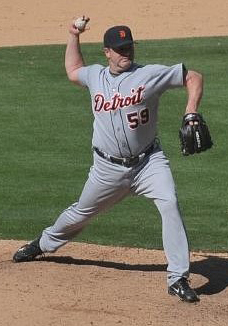
Todd Jones struck out 22 batters for the Phillies in the 2004 season.

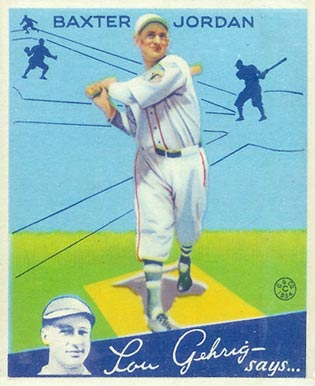
Buck Jordan amassed a .300 batting average in his only season with Philadelphia.

List of players whose surnames begin with J, showing season(s) and position(s) played and selected statistics
Name	Season(s)	Position(s)	Notes	Ref
Fred Jacklitsch	1900–1902; 1907–1910	Catcher	.222 batting average; 23 doubles; 62 runs batted in	
Danny Jackson	1993–1994	Pitcher	26–17 record; 3.53 earned run average; 249 strikeouts	
Grant Jackson	1965–1970	Pitcher	23–43 record; 3.99 earned run average; 431 strikeouts	
John Jackson	1933	Pitcher	2–2 record; 6.00 earned run average; 11 strikeouts	
Ken Jackson	1987	Shortstop	.250 batting average; 2 doubles; 2 runs batted in	
Larry Jackson	1966–1968	Pitcher	41–45 record; 2.95 earned run average; 373 strikeouts	
Mike R. Jackson	1986–1987	Pitcher	3–10 record; 4.11 earned run average; 96 strikeouts	
Mike W. Jackson	1970	Pitcher	1–1 record; 1.42 earned run average; 4 strikeouts	
Elmer Jacobs	1914; 1918–1919	Pitcher	16–18 record; 3.42 earned run average; 87 strikeouts	
Tom Jacquez	2000	Pitcher	11.05 earned run average; 6 strikeouts; 3 walks	
Art Jahn	1928	Right fielder	.223 batting average; 4 doubles; 11 runs batted in	
Chris James	1986–1989	Left fielder Right fielder	.254 batting average; 39 home runs; 144 runs batted in	
Jeff James	1968–1969	Pitcher	6–6 record; 4.52 earned run average; 104 strikeouts	
Stan Javier	1992	Center fielder Left fielder	.261 batting average; 14 doubles; 24 strikeouts	
Gregg Jefferies	1995–1998	Left fielder	.287 batting average; 37 home runs; 203 runs batted in	
Irv Jeffries	1934	Second baseman	.246 batting average; 4 home runs; 19 runs batted in	
Greg Jelks	1987	Third baseman	.091 batting average; 2 runs scored; 14 plate appearances	
Steve Jeltz	1983–1989	Shortstop	.213 batting average; 20 triples; 120 runs batted in	
Ferguson Jenkins^{†}	1965–1966	Pitcher	2–1 record; 2.45 earned run average; 12 strikeouts	
Geoff Jenkins	2008	Right fielder	.246 batting average; 9 home runs; 29 runs batted in	
Hughie Jennings^{†}	1901–1902	First baseman	.267 batting average; 2 home runs; 71 runs batted in	
Alex Johnson	1964–1965	Left fielder	.296 batting average; 12 home runs; 46 runs batted in	
Charlie Johnson	1908	Center fielder	.250 batting average; 1 triple; 2 runs batted in	
Darrell Johnson	1961	Catcher	.230 batting average; 1 double; 3 runs batted in	
Davey Johnson	1977–1978	First baseman	.273 batting average; 10 home runs; 50 runs batted in	
Deron Johnson	1969–1973	First baseman	.251 batting average; 88 home runs; 304 runs batted in	
Jerry Johnson	1968–1969	Pitcher	10–17 record; 3.91 earned run average; 122 strikeouts	
Ken Johnson	1950–1951	Pitcher	9–9 record; 4.37 earned run average; 90 strikeouts	
Lou Johnson	1894	Pitcher	1–1 record; 6.06 earned run average; 10 strikeouts	
Si Johnson	1940–1943; 1946	Pitcher	26–48 record; 4.10 earned run average; 264 strikeouts	
Syl Johnson	1934–1940	Pitcher	36–51 record; 4.50 earned run average; 308 strikeouts	
Youngy Johnson	1897	Pitcher	1–2 record; 4.66 earned run average; 7 strikeouts	
Jay Johnstone	1974–1978	Right fielder	.303 batting average; 33 home runs; 200 runs batted in	
Stan Jok	1954	Pinch hitter^{[a]}	.000 batting average; 2 strikeouts; 3 plate appearances	
Alex Jones	1894	Pitcher	1–0 record; 2.00 earned run average; 3 strikeouts	
Barry Jones	1992	Pitcher	5–6 record; 4.64 earned run average; 19 strikeouts	
Broadway Jones	1923	Pitcher	9.00 earned run average; 1 strikeout; 7 walks	
Dale Jones	1941	Pitcher	0–1 record; 7.56 earned run average; 2 strikeouts	
Doug Jones	1994	Pitcher	2–4 record; 2.17 earned run average; 38 strikeouts	
Nippy Jones	1952	First baseman	.167 batting average; 1 home run; 5 runs batted in	
Ron Jones	1988–1991	Right fielder	.272 batting average; 13 home runs; 40 runs batted in	
Todd Jones	2004	Pitcher	3–3 record; 4.97 earned run average; 22 strikeouts	
Willie Jones^{§}	1947–1959	Third baseman	.258 batting average; 180 home runs; 753 runs batted in	
Bubber Jonnard	1926–1927; 1935	Catcher	.258 batting average; 7 doubles; 16 runs batted in	
Buck Jordan	1938	Third baseman	.300 batting average; 18 doubles; 18 runs batted in	
Charlie Jordan	1896	Pitcher	7.71 earned run average; 3 strikeouts; 2 walks	
Kevin Jordan	1995–2001	Second baseman Third baseman	.258 batting average; 23 home runs; 175 batting average	
Niles Jordan	1951	Pitcher	2–3 record; 3.19 earned run average; 11 strikeouts	
Ricardo Jordan	1996	Pitcher	2–2 record; 1.80 earned run average; 17 strikeouts	
Ricky Jordan	1988–1994	First baseman	.282 batting average; 54 home runs; 300 runs batted in	
Orville Jorgens	1935–1937	Pitcher	21–27 record; 4.70 earned run average; 149 strikeouts	
Rick Joseph	1967–1970	Third baseman First baseman	.245 batting average; 13 home runs; 64 runs batted in	
Oscar Judd	1945–1948	Pitcher	20–33 record; 4.08 earned run average; 162 strikeouts	
Jeff Juden	1994–1995	Pitcher	3–8 record; 4.68 earned run average; 69 strikeouts	
George Jumonville	1940–1941	Shortstop	.146 batting average; 1 home run; 2 runs batted in	
Eric Junge	2002–2003	Pitcher	2–0 record; 2.21 earned run average; 16 strikeouts	
Al Jurisich	1946–1947	Pitcher	5–10 record; 4.48 earned run average; 82 strikeouts	

== Footnotes ==
Key

- ^{H} The National Baseball Hall of Fame and Museum determines which cap a player wears on their plaque, signifying "the team with which he made his most indelible mark". The Hall of Fame considers the player's wishes in making their decision, but the Hall makes the final decision as "it is important that the logo be emblematic of the historical accomplishments of that player’s career".
- ^{P} Players are listed at a position if they appeared in 30% of their games or more during their Phillies career, as defined by Baseball-Reference. Additional positions may be shown on the Baseball-Reference website by following each player's citation.
- ^{R} Franchise batting and pitching leaders are drawn from Baseball-Reference. A total of 1,500 plate appearances are needed to qualify for batting records, and 500 innings pitched or 50 decisions are required to qualify for pitching records.
- ^{S} Statistics are correct as of the end of the 2010 Major League Baseball season.

List

- ^{a} Stan Jok is listed by Baseball-Reference as a third baseman and left fielder, but never appeared in a game in the field for the Phillies.
