= Position (team sports) =

Joint arrangement of a team on its field of play

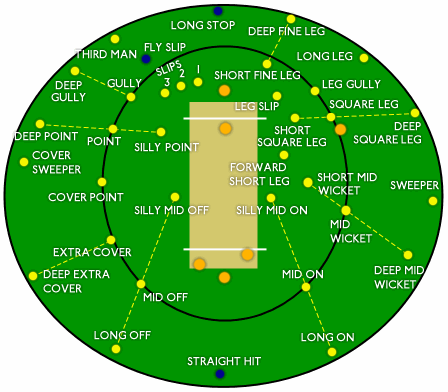
Cricket fielding positions

In team sports, a position is the role and placement of an individual player within the arrangement of players on the field of play during a game.

Many sports measure performance of individual players based on standards for their specific positions. Players' suitability for certain positions is often linked to specific attributes and skill requirements.

For information about team or player positions in some particular sports, see:

== Basketball ==
- Basketball positions

== Batting sports ==
- Baseball fielding positions
- Cricket fielding positions

== Football ==
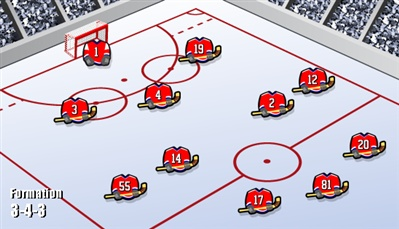
Bandy positions in 3-4-3 formation

- American football positions
- Association football positions
- Australian rules football positions
- Gaelic football positions
- Rugby league positions
- Rugby union positions

== Hockey ==
- Bandy positions are virtually the same as the association football positions
- Field hockey positions
- Ice hockey positions:
  - Goaltender
  - Defenceman
  - Forward

== Net and wall sports ==
- Lawn tennis players in doubles competition alternate between two positions. That is, the service side alternates as server and partner while the receiving side alternates as receiver and partner. There is no substitution of players and the two partners necessarily divide the two pairs of positions almost equally.
- Volleyball players rotate through six positions, taken on the court at the serve. But the positions are not fixed during a volley, only moderately regulated. Volleyball player specialization is highly refined and strategy focuses on how to use specialized players in unequal ways.

== See also ==
- Gaelic football, hurling and camogie positions
