= Total chances =

Baseball statistic

In baseball statistics, total chances (TC), also called chances offered, represents the number of plays in which a defensive player has participated. It is the sum of putouts plus assists plus errors. Chances accepted refers to the total of putouts and assists only.

== See also ==
- Fielding percentage
