= Philadelphia Phillies all-time roster (N–O) =

List of baseball players

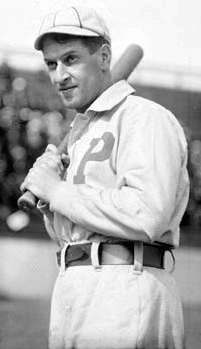
Kid Nichols won five National League pennants with Boston before playing for the Phillies in 1905 and 1906.

The Philadelphia Phillies are a Major League Baseball team based in Philadelphia, Pennsylvania. They are a member of the Eastern Division of Major League Baseball's National League. The team has played officially under two names since beginning play in 1883: the current moniker, as well as the "Quakers", which was used in conjunction with "Phillies" during the team's early history. The team was also known unofficially as the "Blue Jays" during the World War II era. Since the franchise's inception, 2,081 players have made an appearance in a competitive game for the team, whether as an offensive player (batting and baserunning) or a defensive player (fielding, pitching, or both).

Of those 2,081 Phillies, 33 have had surnames beginning with the letter N, and 26 beginning with the letter O. One member of this list has been inducted into the Baseball Hall of Fame; pitcher Kid Nichols played two seasons for the Phillies (1905–1906). No Phillies players with surnames beginning with N or O have been inducted into the Philadelphia Baseball Wall of Fame; however, Paul Owens was a team manager, general manager, and executive from 1972 to 2003. No members of this list hold franchise records, nor have any numbers been retired for them.

Among the 33 batters in this list, Lefty O'Doul has the highest batting average, at .391; he played for the Phillies during the 1929 and 1930 seasons. Other players with an average over .300 include Lou Novikoff (.304 in one season; the only player whose surname begins with N to bat over .300), Dink O'Brien (.333 in one season), and Al Oliver (.312 in one season). Ron Northey leads all members of this list with 60 home runs and 273 runs batted in; among players whose surname begins with O, O'Doul leads with 54 and 219, respectively.

Of this list's 28 pitchers, three share the best win–loss record, in terms of winning percentage: Red Nelson, Jerry Nops, and Eddie Oropesa each have a 1.000 winning percentage, Nelson having won two games and lost none, and Nops and Oropesa each winning one game without a loss. Al Orth, in his seven seasons as a Phillies, accumulated 100 victories and 72 defeats, tops in both categories on this list; among pitchers whose surname begins with N, Nichols' 10 wins and Dickie Noles' 11 losses are highest. Orth and Noles also lead their respective lists in strikeouts: Orth with 359, and Noles with 133. Roy Oswalt's 1.74 earned run average (ERA) is the lowest among members of this list; of the pitchers whose surname begins with N, Nichols' 2.83 ERA is best.

One player, Jack Neagle, has made 30% or more of his Phillies appearances as a pitcher and a position player. He amassed a 1–7 pitching record with a 6.90 ERA while batting in four runs as a left fielder.

Key to symbols in player list(s)
† or ‡	Indicates a member of the National Baseball Hall of Fame and Museum; ‡ indicates that the Phillies are the player's primary team^{[H]}
§	Indicates a member of the Philadelphia Baseball Wall of Fame
*	Indicates a team record^{[R]}
(#)	A number following a player's name indicates that the number was retired by the Phillies in the player's honor.
Year	Italic text indicates that the player is a member of the Phillies' active (25-man) roster.
Position(s)	Indicates the player's primary position(s)^{[P]}
Notes	Statistics shown only for playing time with Phillies^{[S]}
Ref	References

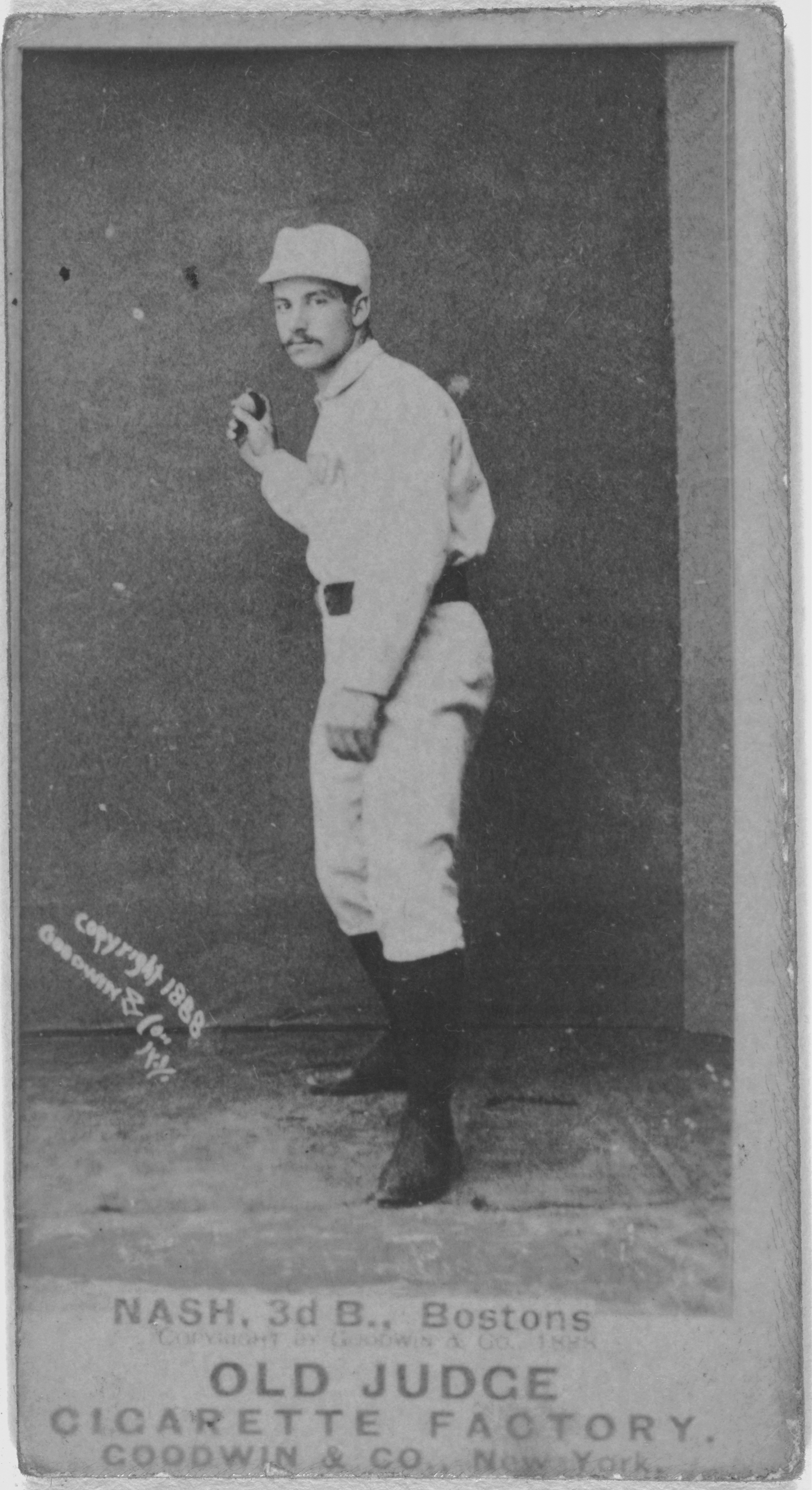
Billy Nash hit three home runs for the Phillies, one for each season he spent with the team.

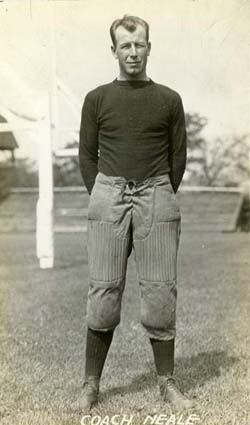
Although Greasy Neale spent a short time with the Phillies in 1921, he is more famous as an American football player and coach; he is a member of both the College and Pro Football Halls of Fame.

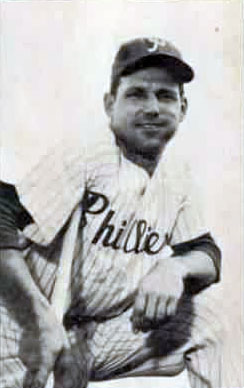
Bill "Swish" Nicholson hit 30 home runs in 5 seasons with Philadelphia.

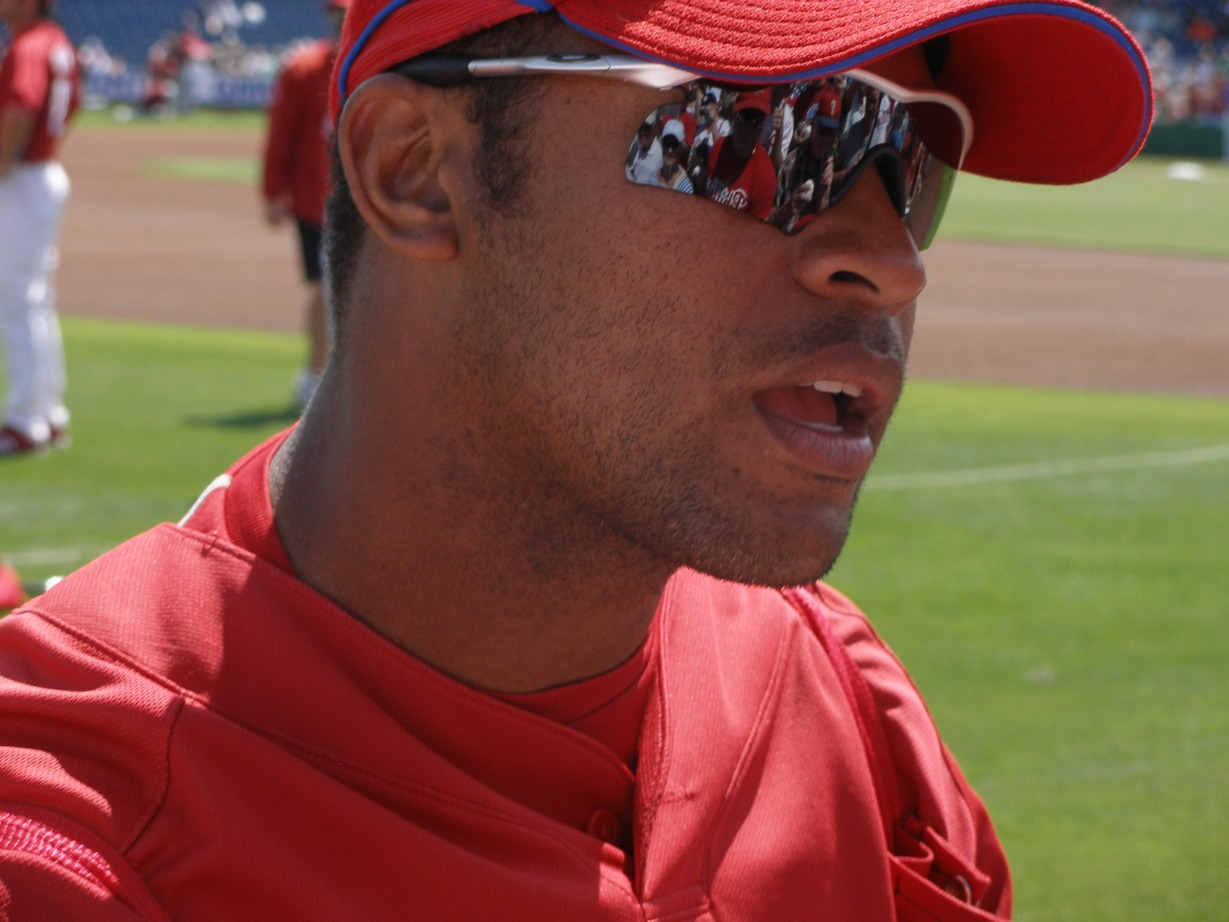
Abraham Núñez played third base for the Phillies for two seasons.

List of players whose surnames begin with N, showing season(s) and position(s) played and selected statistics
Name	Season(s)	Position(s)	Notes	Ref
Bill Nagel	1941	Second baseman	.143 batting average; 2 extra-base hits; 6 runs batted in	
Sam Nahem	1942; 1948	Pitcher	4–6 record; 5.86 earned run average; 68 strikeouts	
Bill Nahorodny	1976	Catcher	.200 batting average; 1 double; 5 plate appearances	
Billy Nash	1896–1898	Third baseman	.252 batting average; 3 home runs; 78 runs batted in	
Jim Nash	1972	Pitcher	0–8 record; 6.27 earned run average; 15 strikeouts	
Earl Naylor	1942–1943	Center fielder	.188 batting average; 3 home runs; 28 runs batted in	
Jack Neagle	1883	Left fielder Pitcher	.164 batting average; 4 runs batted in; 1–7 record; 6.90 earned run average	
Greasy Neale	1921	Right fielder	.211 batting average; 1 run batted in; 7 runs scored	
Cal Neeman	1960–1961	Catcher	.188 batting average; 4 home runs; 15 runs batted in	
Ron Negray	1955–1956	Pitcher	6–6 record; 3.84 earned run average; 74 strikeouts	
Gary Neibauer	1972	Pitcher	0–2 record; 5.30 earned run average; 7 strikeouts	
Al Neiger	1960	Pitcher	5.68 earned run average; 3 strikeouts; 4 walks	
Red Nelson	1912–1913	Pitcher	2–0 record; 3.25 earned run average; 5 strikeouts	
Tom Newell	1987	Pitcher	36.00 earned run average; 1 strikeout; 3 walks	
David Newhan	2000–2001	Second baseman	.217 batting average; 1 run batted in; 5 runs scored	
Skeeter Newsome	1946–1947	Shortstop	.231 batting average; 3 home runs; 45 runs batted in	
Gus Niarhos	1954–1955	Catcher	.143 batting average; 2 hits; 14 plate appearances	
Chet Nichols, Sr.	1930–1932	Pitcher	1–5 record; 4.17 earned run average; 20 strikeouts	
Kid Nichols^{†}	1905–1906	Pitcher	10–7 record; 2.83 earned run average; 51 strikeouts	
Bill Nicholson	1949–1953	Right fielder	.238 batting average; 30 home runs; 115 runs batted in	
Frank Nicholson	1912	Pitcher	6.75 earned run average; 1 strikeout; 2 walks	
Doug Nickle	2000–2002	Pitcher	7.00 earned run average; 3 strikeouts; 6 walks	
Bert Niehoff	1915–1917	Second baseman	.244 batting average; 8 home runs; 152 runs batted in	
Tom Nieto	1989–1990	Catcher	.160 batting average; 1 double; 4 runs batted in	
Al Nixon	1926–1928	Center fielder	.291 batting average; 4 home runs; 66 runs batted in	
Ed Nolan	1885	Pitcher	1–5 record; 4.17 earned run average; 20 strikeouts	
Dickie Noles	1979–1981; 1990	Pitcher	6–11 record; 3.96 earned run average; 133 strikeouts	
Jerry Nops	1896	Pitcher	1–0 record; 5.14 earned run average; 1 strikeout	
Leo Norris	1936–1937	Shortstop; Second baseman	.262 batting average; 20 home runs; 112 runs batted in	
Ron Northey	1942–1944; 1946–1947; 1957	Right fielder	.269 batting average; 60 home runs; 273 runs batted in	
Lou Novikoff	1946	Left fielder	.304 batting average; 1 double; 3 runs batted in	
Abraham Núñez	2006–2007	Third baseman	.221 batting average; 2 home runs; 48 runs batted in	
Ryan Nye	1997–1998	Pitcher	0–2 record; 9.69 earned run average; 10 strikeouts	

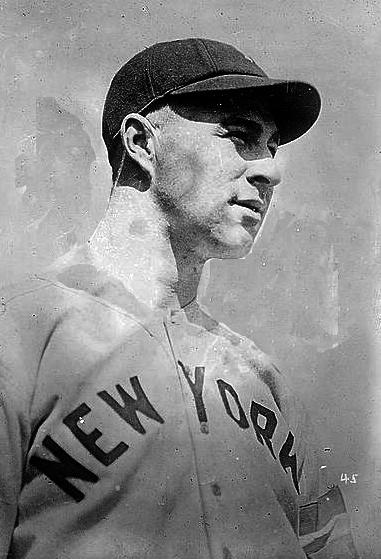
Left fielder Lefty O'Doul batted .391 over two seasons in Philadelphia.

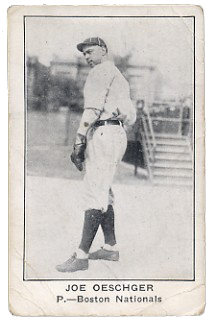
Joe Oeschger had two tenures with the Phillies, pitching for the club from 1914 to 1919, and again in 1924.

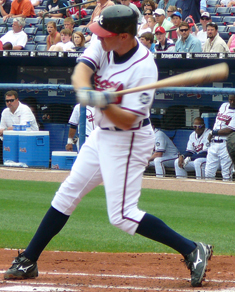
Pete Orr joined the Phillies in 2011 for the first time.

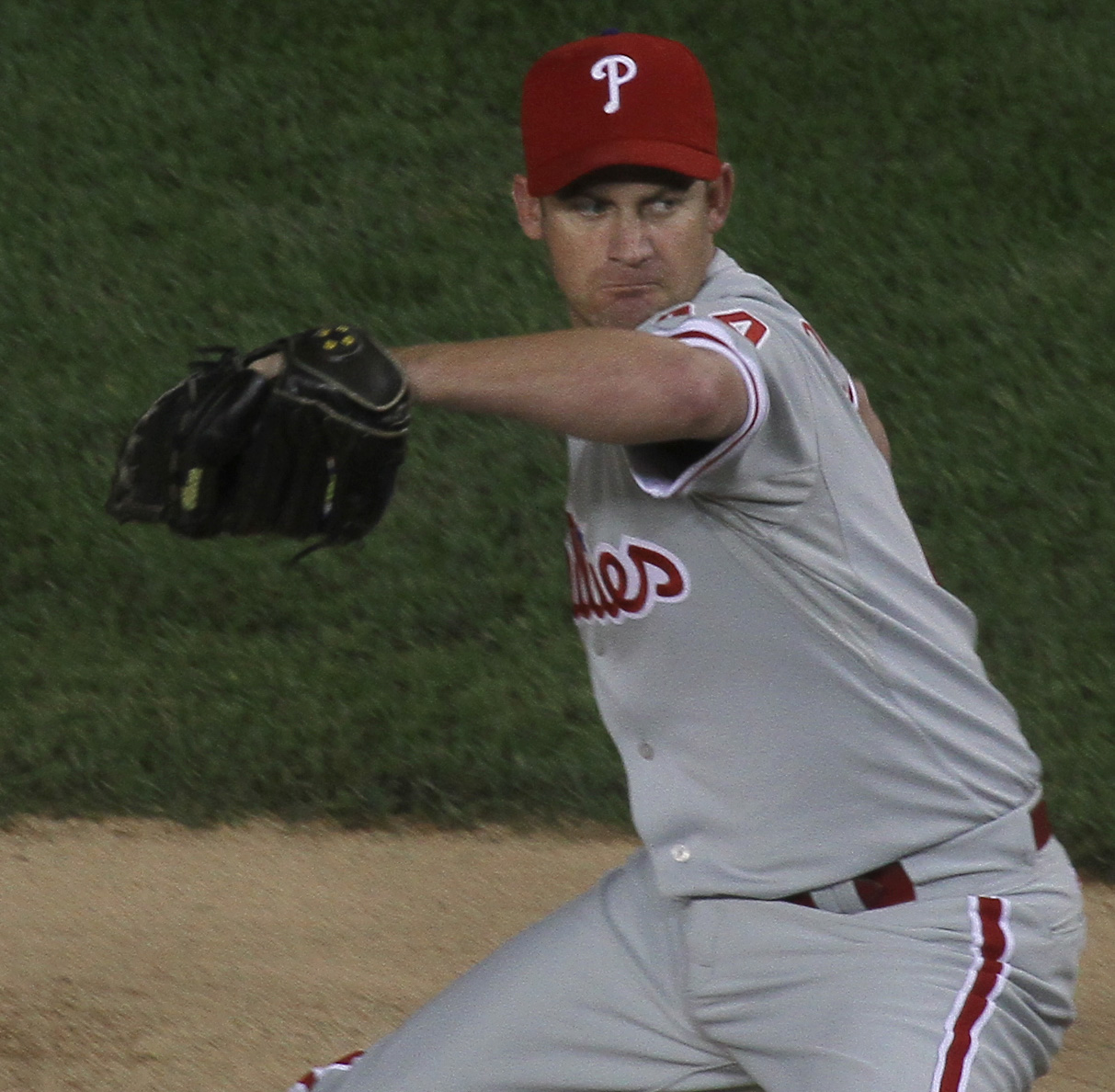
Roy Oswalt was acquired at the 2010 trade deadline from the Houston Astros, collecting a 7–1 record from July 31 to the end of the season.

List of players whose surnames begin with O, showing season(s) and position(s) played and selected statistics
Name	Season(s)	Position(s)	Notes	Ref
Dink O'Brien	1923	Catcher	.333 batting average; 2 doubles; 3 runs scored	
Frank O'Connor	1893	Pitcher	11.25 earned run average; 9 walks; 4 innings pitched	
Harry O'Donnell	1927	Catcher	.063 batting average; 2 runs batted in; 1 run scored	
Lefty O'Doul	1929–1930	Left fielder	.391 batting average; 54 home runs; 219 runs batted in	
Randy O'Neal	1989	Pitcher	0–1 record; 6.23 earned run average; 29 strikeouts	
Skinny O'Neal	1925; 1927	Pitcher	9.24 earned run average; 8 strikeouts; 14 walks	
John O'Neil	1946	Shortstop	.266 batting average; 9 runs batted in; 12 runs scored	
Joe O'Rourke	1929	Pinch hitter^{[a]}	.000 batting average; 3 plate appearances	
Prince Oana	1934	Left fielder	.238 batting average; 3 runs batted in; 3 runs scored	
Johnny Oates	1975–1976	Catcher	.277 batting average; 1 home run; 33 runs batted in	
Joe Oeschger	1914–1919; 1924	Pitcher	29–48 record; 3.32 earned run average; 268 strikeouts	
José Offerman	2005	First baseman	.182 batting average; 1 home run; 3 runs batted in	
Chad Ogea	1999	Pitcher	6–12 record; 5.63 earned run average; 77 strikeouts	
Bob Oldis	1962–1963	Catcher	.242 batting average; 1 home run; 18 runs batted in	
Omar Olivares	1995	Pitcher	0–1 record; 5.40 earned run average; 7 strikeouts	
Al Oliver	1984	First baseman	.312 batting average; 7 doubles; 14 runs batted in	
Gene Oliver	1967	Catcher	.224 batting average; 7 home runs; 34 runs batted in	
Steve Ontiveros	1989–1990	Pitcher	2–1 record; 3.54 earned run average; 18 strikeouts	
Eddie Oropesa	2001	Pitcher	1–0 record; 4.74 earned run average; 15 strikeouts	
Pete Orr	2011	Second baseman	.219 batting average; 3 doubles; 4 runs batted in	
Al Orth	1895–1901	Pitcher	100–72 record; 3.49 earned run average; 359 strikeouts	
Fred Osborn	1907–1909	Center fielder	.251 batting average; 2 home runs; 72 runs batted in	
Roy Oswalt	2010–2011	Pitcher	16–11 record; 2.96 earned run average; 166 strikeouts	
Ricky Otero	1996–1997	Center fielder	.267 batting average; 2 home runs; 35 runs batted in	
Jim Owens	1955–1956; 1958–1962	Pitcher	24–46 record; 4.54 earned run average; 308 strikeouts	
Red Owens	1899	Second baseman	.048 batting average; 1 run batted in; 24 plate appearances	

== Footnotes ==
Key

- ^{H} The National Baseball Hall of Fame and Museum determines which cap a player wears on their plaque, signifying "the team with which he made his most indelible mark". The Hall of Fame considers the player's wishes in making their decision, but the Hall makes the final decision as "it is important that the logo be emblematic of the historical accomplishments of that player's career".
- ^{P} Players are listed at a position if they appeared in 30% of their games or more during their Phillies career, as defined by Baseball-Reference.com. Additional positions may be shown on the Baseball-Reference website by following each player's citation.
- ^{R} Franchise batting and pitching leaders are drawn from Baseball-Reference.com. A total of 1,500 plate appearances are needed to qualify for batting records, and 500 innings pitched or 50 decisions are required to qualify for pitching records.
- ^{S} Statistics are correct as of the end of the 2010 Major League Baseball season.

Table

- ^{a} Joe O'Rourke is listed by Baseball-Reference without a position; he appeared in three career games in 1929.
