= Philadelphia Phillies all-time roster (K) =

List of baseball players

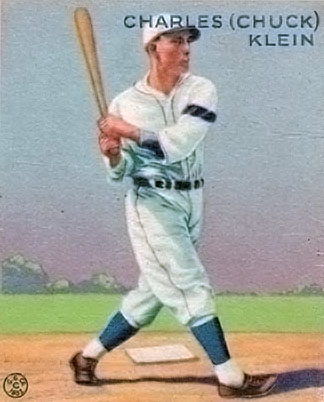
In addition to being a Hall of Famer and member of the Philadelphia Baseball Wall of Fame, Chuck Klein holds Phillies franchise records in career slugging percentage and OPS, as well as six single-season franchise records and two National League records.

The Philadelphia Phillies are a Major League Baseball team based in Philadelphia, Pennsylvania. They are a member of the Eastern Division of Major League Baseball's National League. The team has played officially under two names since beginning play in 1883: the current moniker, as well as the "Quakers", which was used in conjunction with "Phillies" during the team's early history. The team was also known unofficially as the "Blue Jays" during the World War II era. Since the franchise's inception, 2,081 players have made an appearance in a competitive game for the team, whether as an offensive player (batting and baserunning) or a defensive player (fielding, pitching, or both).

Of those 2,081 Phillies, 68 have had surnames beginning with the letter K. Two of those players have been inducted into the Baseball Hall of Fame: pitcher Tim Keefe, who holds the record for the lowest single-season earned run average (ERA) in major league history; and right fielder Chuck Klein, who played 15 seasons for Philadelphia in three separate stints. The Phillies are listed by the Hall of Fame as Klein's primary team. He is one of two members of this list to be elected to the Philadelphia Baseball Wall of Fame—the other being John Kruk— and holds two franchise records (career slugging percentage – .553; career on-base plus slugging – .935). Klein is the only player on this list for whom the Phillies have retired a number; since he began play with Philadelphia before uniform numbers were widely in use and wore a variety of numbers throughout his Phillies career, he is represented by the letter "P" rather than a specific number.

Among the 32 batters in this list, Klein has the highest batting average, at .326; other players with an average over .300 include Bill Keister (.320 in one season), Ed Konetchy (.321 in one season), and Kruk (.309 in six seasons). Klein also leads all players on this list with 243 home runs and 983 runs batted in.

Of this list's 36 pitchers, two—Jack Kucek and Bob Kuzava—have undefeated win–loss records; each has won one game and lost none. Jim Konstanty, the closer for the Whiz Kids, has 51 victories and 39 defeats, most among this list's pitchers; Keefe's 226 strikeouts lead in that category. Johnny Klippstein compiled this list's lowest earned run average, with a 2.28 average in two seasons with Philadelphia.

Key to symbols in player list(s)
† or ‡	Indicates a member of the National Baseball Hall of Fame and Museum; ‡ indicates that the Phillies are the player's primary team^{[H]}
§	Indicates a member of the Philadelphia Baseball Wall of Fame
*	Indicates a team record^{[R]}
(#)	A number following a player's name indicates that the number was retired by the Phillies in the player's honor.
Year	Italic text indicates that the player is a member of the Phillies' active (25-man) roster.
Position(s)	Indicates the player's primary position(s)^{[P]}
Notes	Statistics shown only for playing time with Phillies^{[S]}
Ref	References

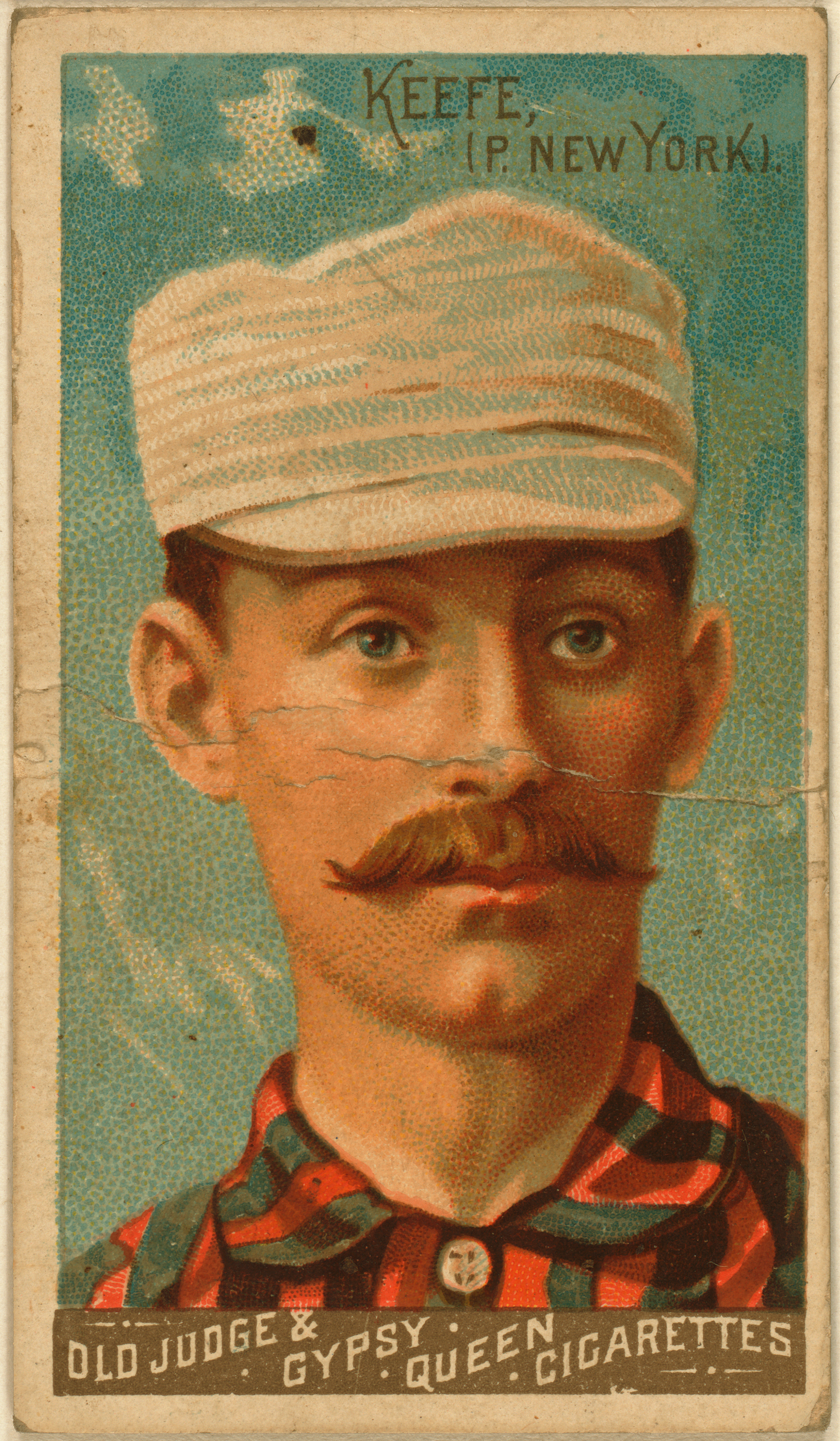
Hall of Famer Tim Keefe won 32 games in three seasons for the Phillies.

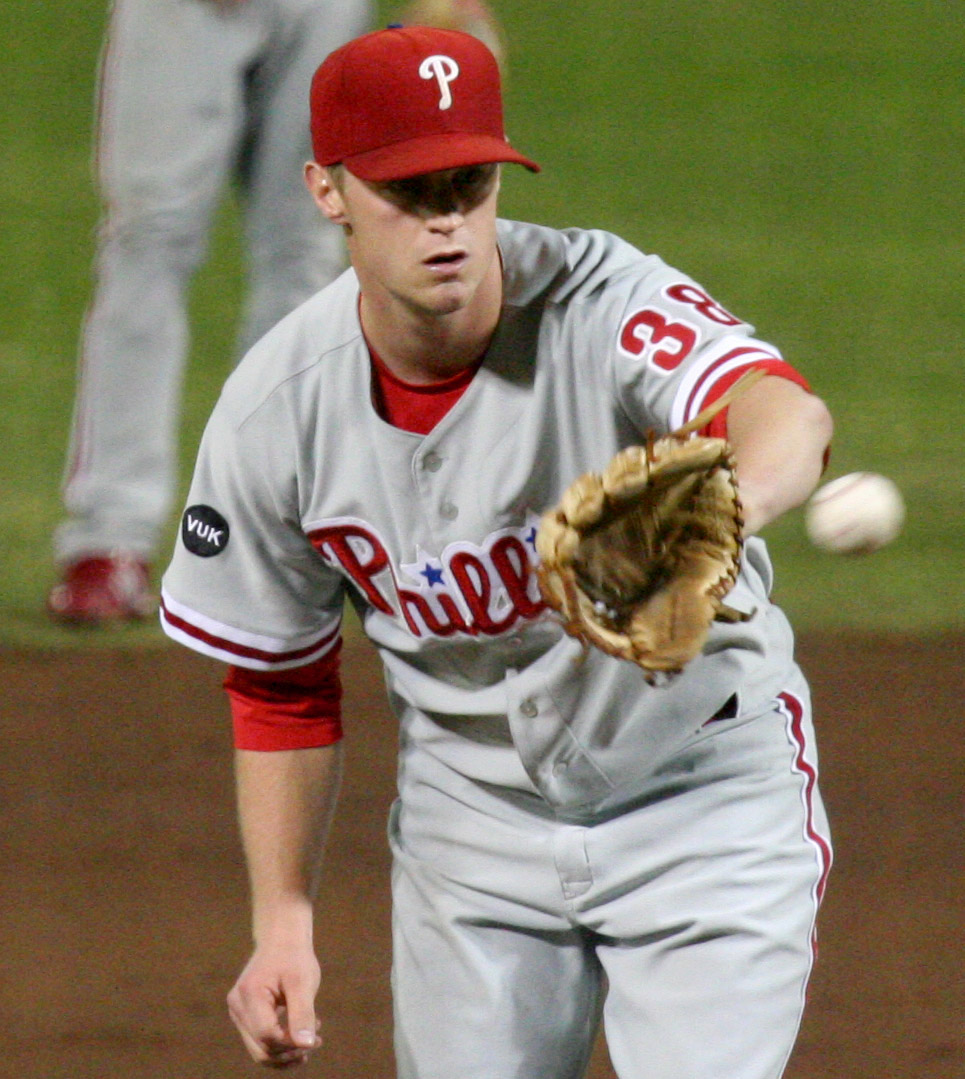
Through the 2011 season, Kyle Kendrick struck out 275 batters for Philadelphia.

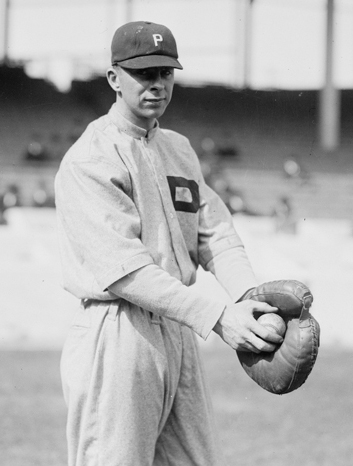
Bill Killefer played seven seasons for the Phillies.

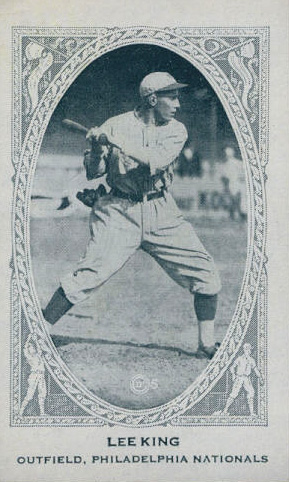
Lee King batted in 45 runs in his Phillies tenure.

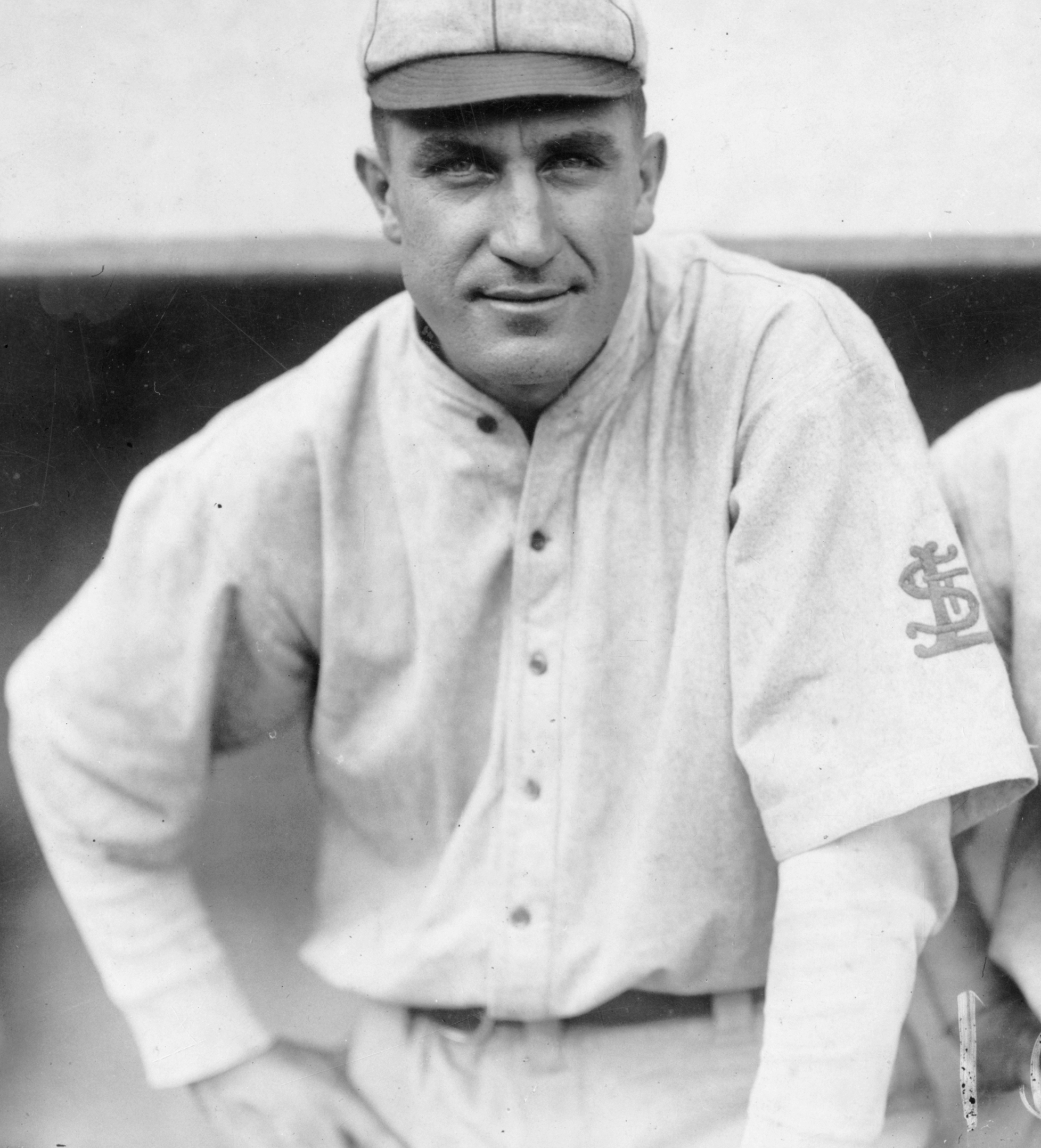
Ed Konetchy batted .321 in his only season in Philadelphia.

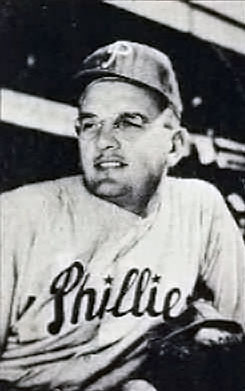
Jim Konstanty won the 1950 National League MVP Award.

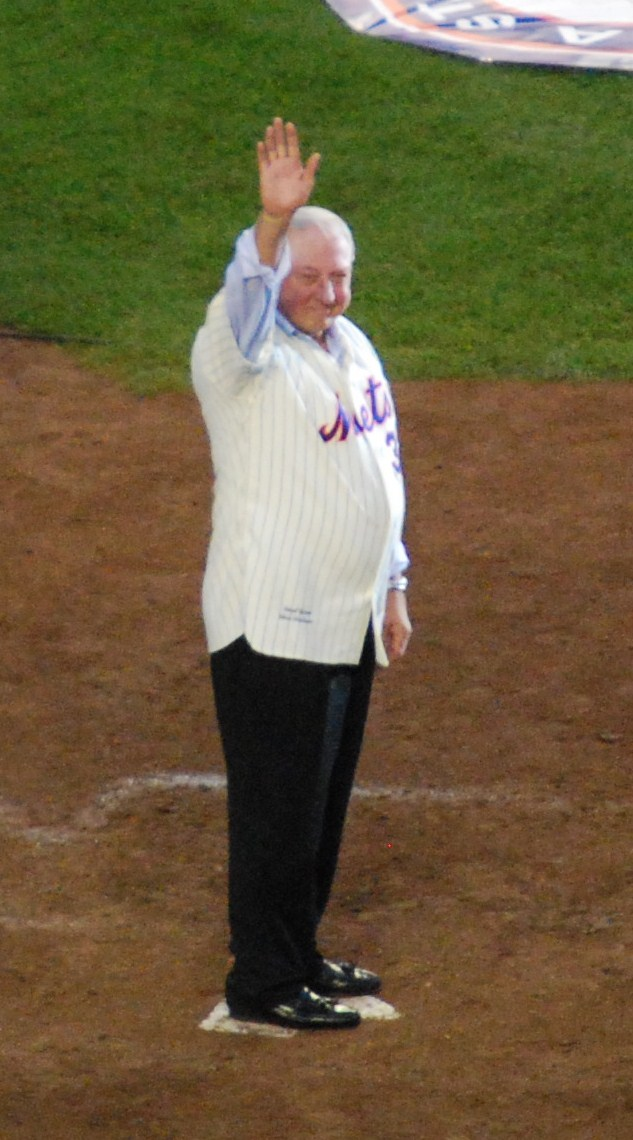
Jerry Koosman won 20 games for the Phillies.

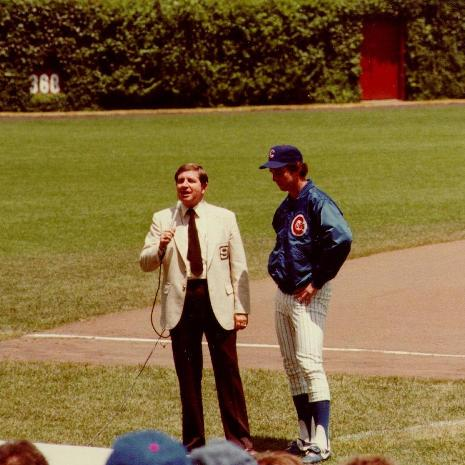
Mike Krukow (right) amassed a 3.12 earned run average during his one season in Philadelphia.

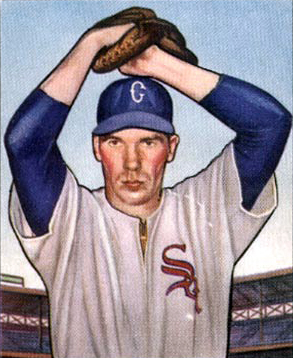
Bob Kuzava won his only decision with the Phillies.

List of players whose surnames begin with K, showing season(s) and position(s) played and selected statistics
Name	Season(s)	Position(s)	Notes	Ref			
Jim Kaat	1976–1979	Pitcher	27–30 record; 4.23 earned run average; 188 strikeouts				
Mike Kahoe	1905	Catcher	.255 batting average; 2 doubles; 4 runs batted in				
Harry Kane	1905–1906	Pitcher	2–4 record; 3.00 earned run average; 26 strikeouts				
Erv Kantlehner	1916	Pitcher	9.00 earned run average; 2 strikeouts; 3 walks				
Joe Kappel	1884	Catcher	.067 batting average; 15 plate appearances; 2 strikeouts				
Andy Karl	1943–1946	Pitcher	15–19 record; 3.48 earned run average; 96 strikeouts				
Ryan Karp	1995; 1997	Pitcher	1–1 record; 5.29 earned run average; 20 strikeouts				
Matt Kata	2005	Second baseman	.167 batting average; 6 plate appearances; 2 strikeouts				
Tony Kaufmann	1927	Pitcher	0–3 record; 10.61 earned run average; 4 strikeouts				
Ted Kazanski	1953–1958	Second baseman Shortstop	.217 batting average; 14 home runs; 116 runs batted in				
Chick Keating	1926	Second baseman Shortstop	.000 batting average; 2 plate appearances				
Tim Keefe^{†}	1891–1893	Pitcher	32–29 record; 3.21 earned run average; 226 strikeouts				
Ed Keegan	1959; 1962	Pitcher	0–3 record; 10.59 earned run average; 8 strikeouts				
Jimmie Keenan	1920–1921	Pitcher	1–2 record; 6.37 earned run average; 9 strikeouts				
Harry Keener	1896	Pitcher	3–11 record; 5.88 earned run average; 28 strikeouts				
Bill Keister	1903	Right fielder	.320 batting average; 3 home runs; 63 runs batted in				
Hal Kelleher	1935–1938	Pitcher	4–9 record; 5.95 earned run average; 49 strikeouts				
Bill Kelly	1928	First baseman	.169 batting average; 1 triple; 5 runs batted in				
Charlie Kelly	1883	Third baseman	.143 batting average; 1 triple; 1 run scored				
John Kelly	1883	Center fielder	.000 batting average; 3 plate appearances				
Mike Kelly	1926	Pitcher	9.45 earned run average; 2 strikeouts; 4 walks				
Al Kenders	1961	Catcher	.174 batting average; 1 double; 1 run batted in	-	Otto Kemp	2025	Third Baseman
Kyle Kendrick	2007–2011	Pitcher	43–30 record; 4.41 earned run average; 275 strikeouts				
John Kennedy	1957	Shortstop	.000 batting average; 2 plate appearances; 1 run scored				
Vern Kennedy	1944–1945	Pitcher	1–8 record; 4.73 earned run average; 36 strikeouts				
Bill Kerksieck	1939	Pitcher	0–2 record; 7.18 earned run average; 13 strikeouts				
Orion Kerkering	2023-Present	Pitcher	0–2 record; 0.00 earned run average; 6 strikeouts				
Jim Kern	1984	Pitcher	0–1 record; 10.13 earned run average; 8 strikeouts				
Bill Killefer	1911–1917	Catcher	.241 batting average; 73 extra-base hits; 156 runs batted in				
Mike Kilroy	1891	Pitcher	0–2 record; 9.90 earned run average; 3 strikeouts				
Newt Kimball	1943	Pitcher	1–6 record; 4.12 earned run average; 33 strikeouts				
Wally Kimmick	1925–1926	Shortstop; Third baseman	.290 batting average; 1 home run; 12 runs batted in				
Lee King	1921–1922	Left fielder	.260 batting average; 6 home runs; 45 runs batted in				
Thornton Kipper	1953–1955	Pitcher	3–4 record; 5.27 earned run average; 35 strikeouts				
Billy Klaus	1962–1963	Third baseman Shortstop	.195 batting average; 4 home runs; 20 runs batted in				
Chuck Klein^{‡§} (P)	1928–1933; 1937–1939; 1940–1944	Right fielder	.326 batting average; .553 slugging percentage*; .935 OPS*; 243 home runs; 983 runs batted in				
Ted Kleinhans	1934	Pitcher	9.00 earned run average; 2 strikeouts; 3 walks				
Red Kleinow	1911	Catcher	.125 batting average; 1 double; 8 plate appearances				
Bill Kling	1891	Pitcher	4–2 record; 4.32 earned run average; 26 strikeouts				
Johnny Klippstein	1963–1964	Pitcher	7–7 record; 2.28 earned run average; 99 strikeouts				
Otto Knabe	1907–1913	Second baseman	.249 batting average; 43 triples; 280 runs batted in				
Phil Knell	1892	Pitcher	5–5 record; 4.05 earned run average; 43 strikeouts				
Alan Knicely	1985	First baseman	.000 batting average; 7 plate appearances; 4 strikeouts				
Jack Knight	1925–1926	Pitcher	10–18 record; 6.71 earned run average; 48 strikeouts				
Joe Knight	1884	Pitcher	2–4 record; 5.47 earned run average; 8 strikeouts				
Fritz Knothe	1933	Third baseman	.150 batting average; 2 doubles; 11 runs batted in				
George Knothe	1932	Second baseman	.083 batting average; 1 double; 12 plate appearances				
Darold Knowles	1966	Pitcher	6–5 record; 3.05 earned run average; 88 strikeouts				
Dick Koecher	1946–1948	Pitcher	0–4 record; 4.91 earned run average; 8 strikeouts				
Pete Koegel	1971–1972	Catcher; First baseman	.173 batting average; 3 doubles; 4 runs batted in				
Ed Konetchy	1921	First baseman	.321 batting average; 8 home runs; 59 runs batted in				
Jim Konstanty	1948–1954	Pitcher	51–39 record; 3.64 earned run average; 205 strikeouts; 54 saves				
Jerry Koosman	1984–1985	Pitcher	20–19 record; 3.67 earned run average; 197 strikeouts				
Joe Koppe	1959–1961	Shortstop	.234 batting average; 8 home runs; 41 runs batted in				
Fred Koster	1931	Right fielder Center fielder	.225 batting average; 4 extra-base hits; 8 runs batted in				
Lou Koupal	1929–1930	Pitcher	5–9 record; 5.91 earned run average; 29 strikeouts				
Fabian Kowalik	1936	Pitcher	1–5 record; 5.38 earned run average; 19 strikeouts				
Ernie Koy	1942	Center fielder Left fielder	.244 batting average; 4 home runs; 26 runs batted in				
Joe Kracher	1939	Catcher	.200 batting average; 1 run scored; 7 plate appearances				
Erik Kratz	2011	Catcher	.333 batting average; 1 double; 6 plate appearances				
Jack Kraus	1943; 1945	Pitcher	13–24 record; 3.81 earned run average; 76 strikeouts				
Gary Kroll	1964	Pitcher	3.00 earned run average; 2 strikeouts; 2 walks				
Otto Krueger	1905	Shortstop	.184 batting average; 1 triple; 12 runs batted in				
Henry Krug	1902	Left fielder	.227 batting average; 6 extra-base hits; 14 runs batted in				
John Kruk^{§}	1989–1994	First baseman	.309 batting average; 62 home runs; 390 runs batted in				
Mike Krukow	1982	Pitcher	13–11 record; 3.12 earned run average; 138 strikeouts				
Jack Kucek	1979	Pitcher	1–0 record; 8.31 earned run average; 2 strikeouts				
Harvey Kuenn	1966	Left fielder	.296 batting average; 9 doubles; 15 runs batted in				
Bob Kuzava	1955	Pitcher	1–0 record; 7.24 earned run average; 13 strikeouts				

== Footnotes ==
Key

- ^{H} The National Baseball Hall of Fame and Museum determines which cap a player wears on their plaque, signifying "the team with which he made his most indelible mark". The Hall of Fame considers the player's wishes in making their decision, but the Hall makes the final decision as "it is important that the logo be emblematic of the historical accomplishments of that player's career".
- ^{P} Players are listed at a position if they appeared in 30% of their games or more during their Phillies career, as defined by Baseball-Reference.com. Additional positions may be shown on the Baseball-Reference website by following each player's citation.
- ^{R} Franchise batting and pitching leaders are drawn from Baseball-Reference.com. A total of 1,500 plate appearances are needed to qualify for batting records, and 500 innings pitched or 50 decisions are required to qualify for pitching records.
- ^{S} Statistics are correct as of the end of the 2010 Major League Baseball season.
