= Philadelphia Phillies all-time roster (A) =

List of baseball players

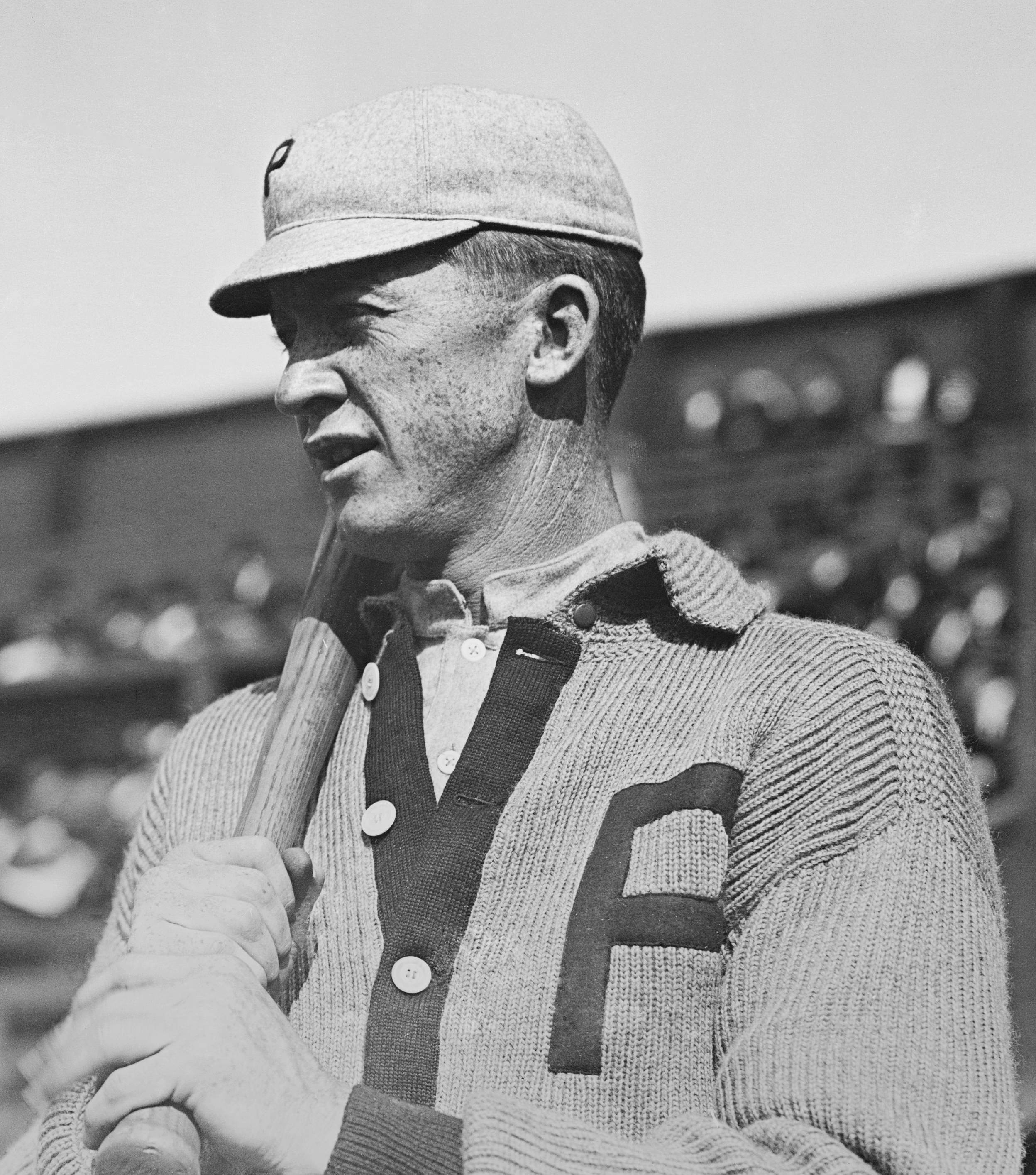
Grover Cleveland Alexander, a member of the Hall of Fame, won two pitching Triple Crowns with the Phillies in his first tenure with the team.

The Philadelphia Phillies are a Major League Baseball team based in Philadelphia, Pennsylvania. They are a member of the Eastern Division of Major League Baseball's National League. The team has played officially under two names since beginning play in 1883: the current moniker, as well as the "Quakers", which was used in conjunction with "Phillies" during the team's early history. The team was also known unofficially as the "Blue Jays" during the World War II era. Since the franchise's inception, 2,081 players have made an appearance in a competitive game for the team, whether as an offensive player (batting and baserunning) or a defensive player (fielding, pitching, or both).

Of those 2,081 Phillies, 51 have had surnames beginning with the letter A. Three of those players have been inducted into the Baseball Hall of Fame: pitcher Grover Cleveland Alexander, who played for the Phillies from 1911 to 1917 and again in 1930; second baseman Sparky Anderson, who played for the team in 1959 and was inducted to the Hall of Fame as a manager; and center fielder Richie Ashburn, who was a Phillie from 1948 to 1959. The Hall of Fame lists the Phillies as the primary team for both Alexander and Ashburn, and they are members of the Philadelphia Baseball Wall of Fame, as is Dick Allen. Ashburn's number 1 has been retired by the Phillies, who have also honored Alexander with a representation of the letter "P"; he played before uniform numbers were used in Major League Baseball. Ashburn also holds a franchise record; his 1,811 career singles are best among all of Philadelphia's players.

Among the 34 batters in this list, catcher Hezekiah Allen has the highest batting average: a .667 mark, with two hits in his three plate appearances. Other players with an average above .300 include Bobby Abreu (.303 in nine seasons), Jim Adduci (.368 in one season), Ethan Allen (.316 in three seasons), Stan Andrews (.333 in one season), Joe Antolick (.333 in one season), Buzz Arlett (.313 in one season), and Ashburn (.311 in twelve seasons). Richie Allen's 204 home runs lead Phillies players whose names begin with A, as do Abreu's 814 runs batted in.

Of this list's 17 pitchers, Antonio Alfonseca has the best win–loss record, in terms of winning percentage; his five wins and two losses notched him a .714 win ratio in his one season with the team. Alexander has the most wins (190), losses (91), and strikeouts (1,409), as well as the lowest earned run average (2.18) among qualifying pitchers; the only player to best Alexander in that category on this list is outfielder Mike Anderson, who made one pitching appearance in 1979, throwing one inning and allowing no runs (a 0.00 ERA).

Key to symbols in player list(s)
| † or ‡ | Indicates a member of the National Baseball Hall of Fame and Museum; ‡ indicates that the Phillies are the player's primary team^{[H]} |
| § | Indicates a member of the Philadelphia Baseball Wall of Fame |
| * | Indicates a team record^{[R]} |
| (#) | A number following a player's name indicates that the number was retired by the Phillies in the player's honor. |
| Year | Italic text indicates that the player is a member of the Phillies' active (25-man) roster. |
| Position(s) | Indicates the player's primary position(s)^{[P]} |
| Notes | Statistics shown only for playing time with Phillies^{[S]} |
| Ref | References |

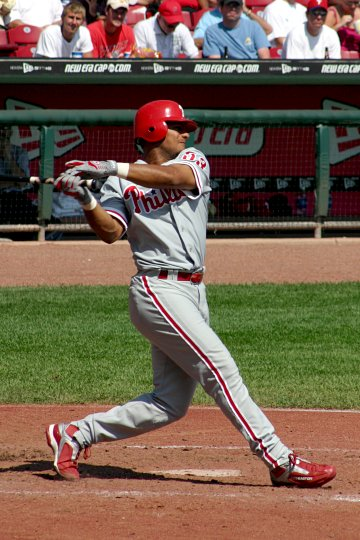
Bobby Abreu accumulated a .303 batting average in nine seasons playing right field in Philadelphia.

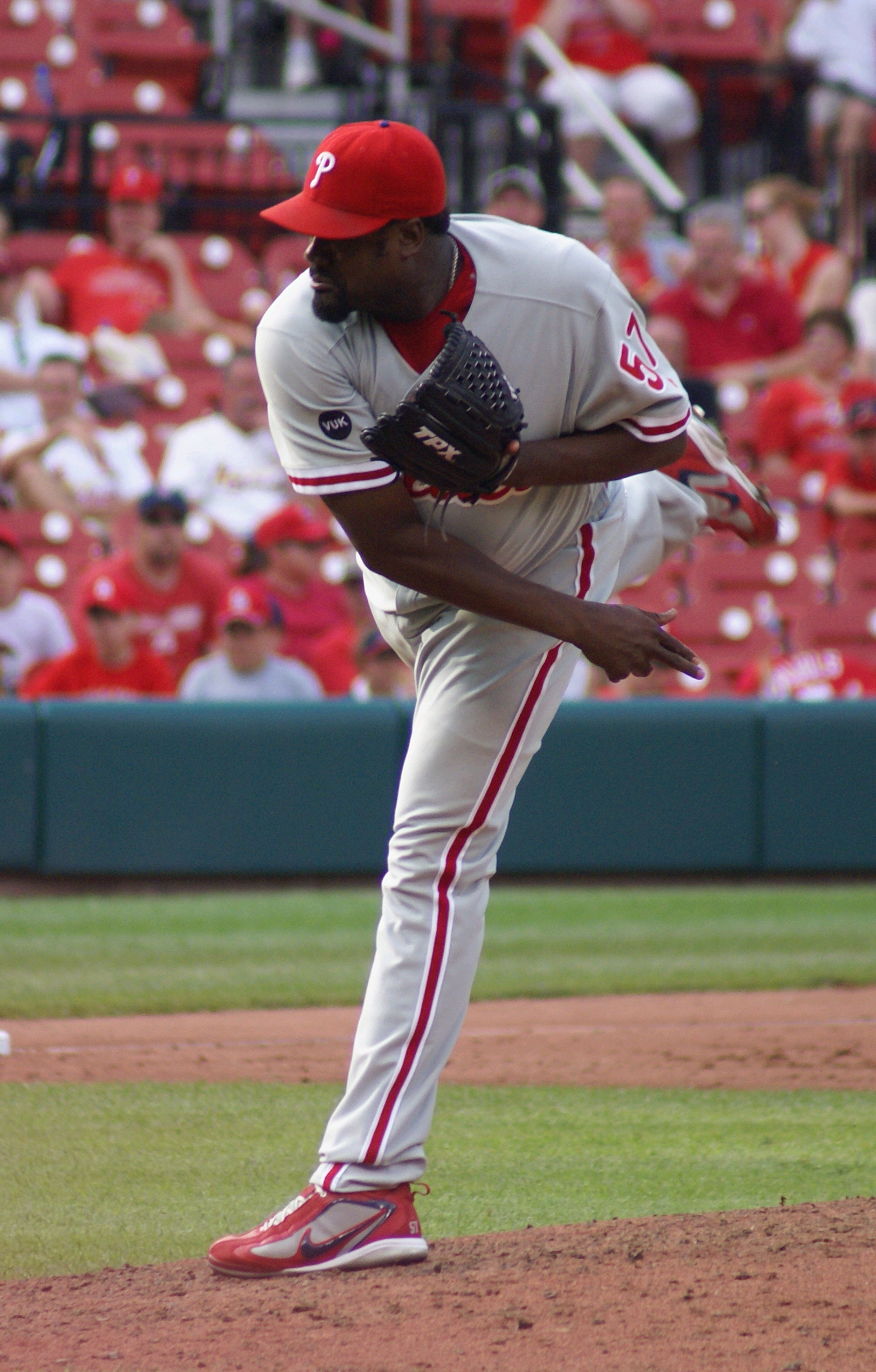
Pitcher Antonio Alfonseca's 5–2 win–loss record is the best among pitchers whose surnames begin with A.

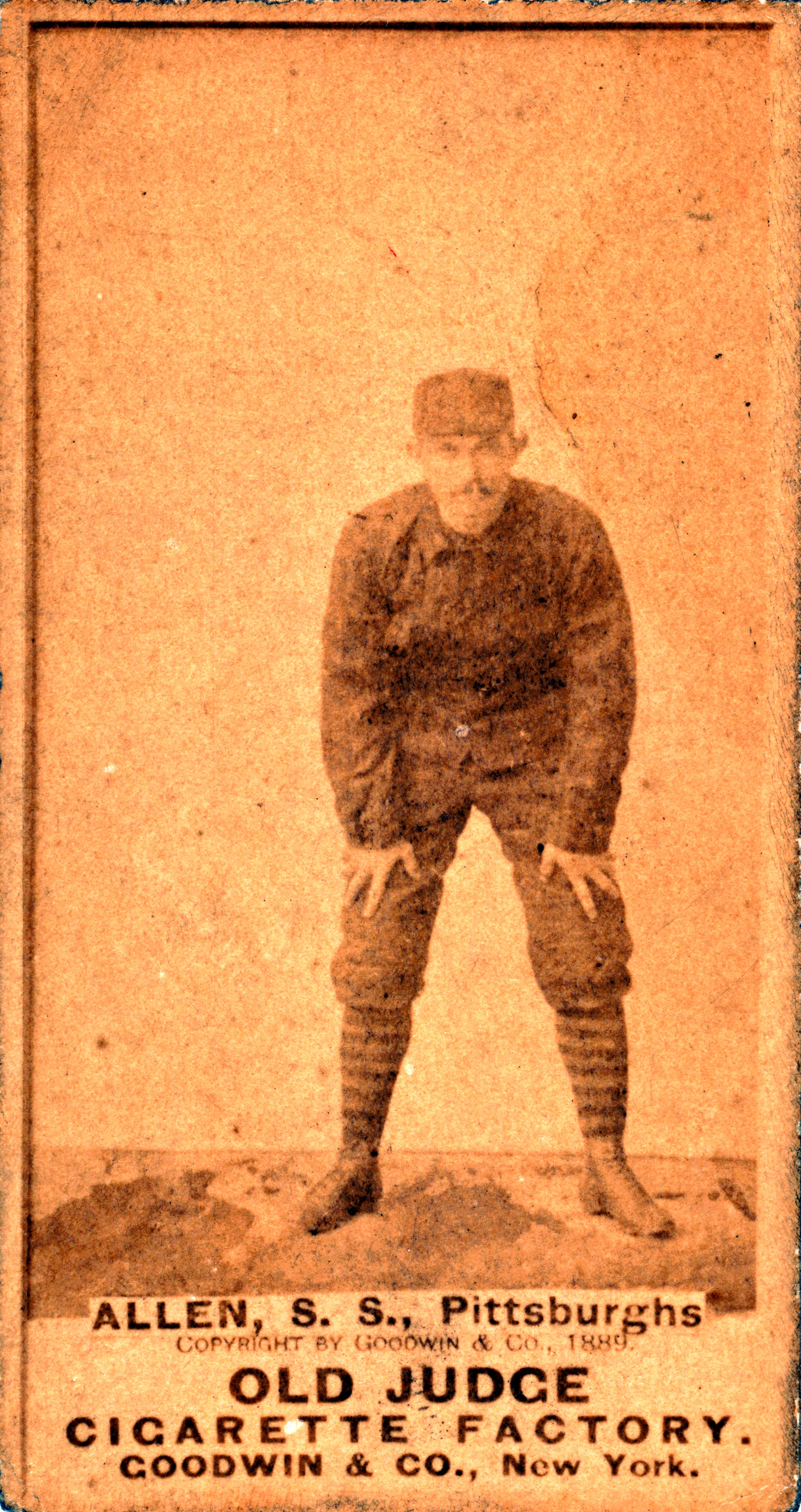
Bob G. Allen played five seasons for the Phillies, also serving as manager for part of the 1890 season.

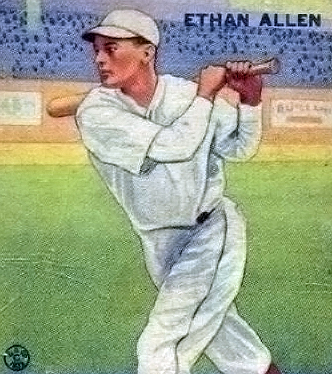
Ethan Allen's .316 batting average in three seasons with the Phillies is the fifth-best mark among the members of this list.

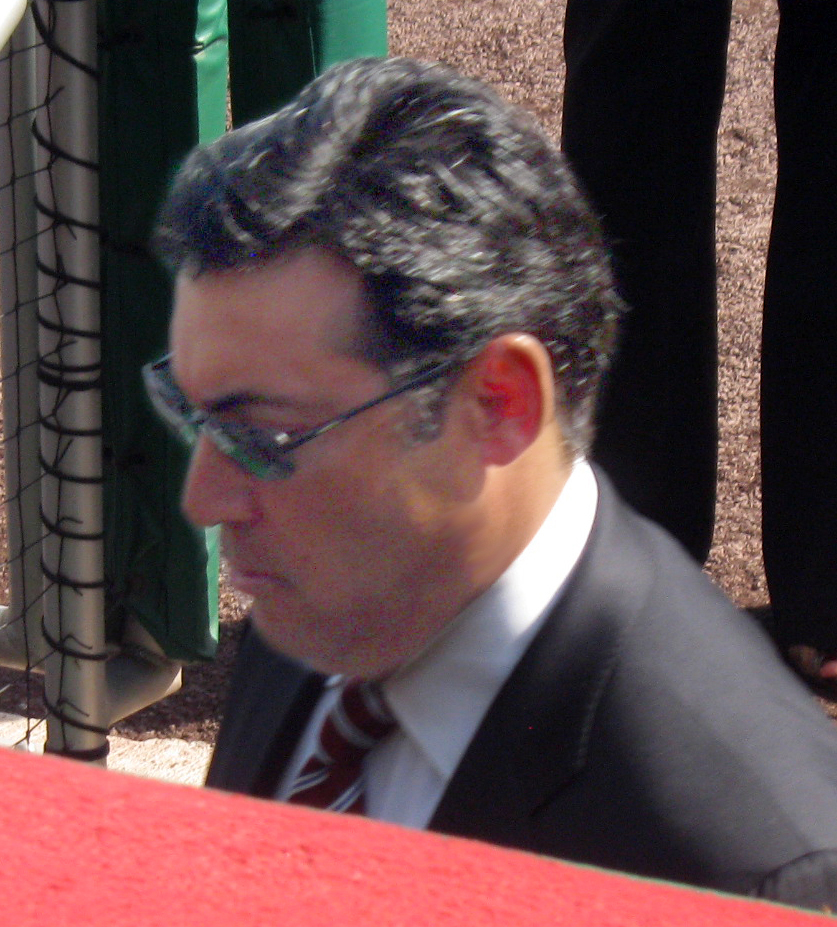
After playing five seasons with Philadelphia, Rubén Amaro, Jr. became the team's general manager in 2009.

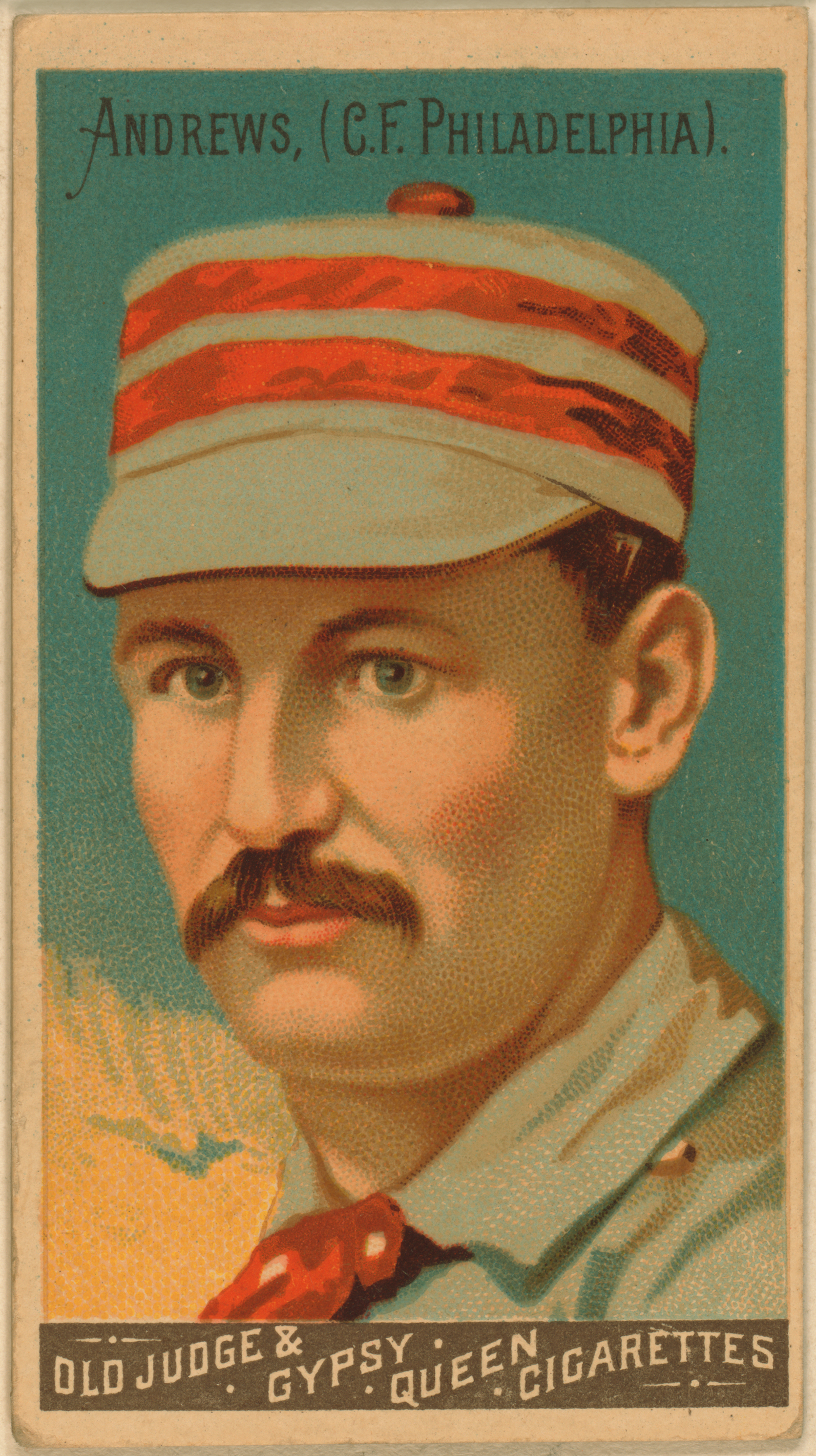
Ed Andrews stole 155 bases in his six Phillies seasons.

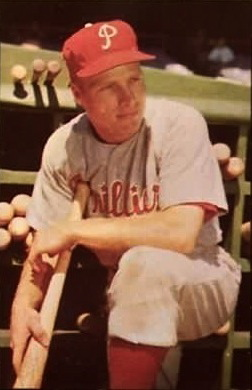
Richie Ashburn's number 1 was retired by the team in his honor.

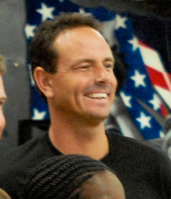
Andy Ashby struck out 101 batters in 3 seasons with the Phillies.

List of players whose surnames begin with A, showing season(s) and position(s) played and selected statistics
| Name | Season(s) | Position(s) | Notes | Ref |
|---|---|---|---|---|
| Ed Abbaticchio | 1897–1898 | Third baseman | .235 batting average; 4 doubles; 14 runs batted in | |
| Fred Abbott | 1905 | Catcher | .195 batting average; 6 doubles; 12 runs batted in | |
| Kyle Abbott | 1992; 1995 | Pitcher | 3–14 record; 4.90 earned run average; 109 strikeouts | |
| Paul Abbott | 2004 | Pitcher | 1–6 record; 6.24 earned run average; 21 strikeouts | |
| Mick Abel | 2025 | Pitcher | | |
| Bobby Abreu | 1998–2006 | Right fielder | .303 batting average; 195 home runs; 814 runs batted in | |
| Cy Acosta | 1975 | Pitcher | 6.23 earned run average; 2 strikeouts; 1 save | |
| Bert Adams | 1915–1919 | Catcher | .201 batting average; 2 home runs; 39 runs batted in | |
| Bob Adams | 1931–1932 | Pitcher | 0–1 record; 5.25 earned run average; 5 strikeouts | |
| Buster Adams | 1943–1945; 1947 | Center fielder | .266 batting average; 25 home runs; 125 runs batted in | |
| Terry Adams | 2002–2003; 2005 | Pitcher | 8–15 record; 4.33 earned run average; 151 strikeouts | |
| Jim Adduci | 1989 | First baseman | .368 batting average; 7 hits; 19 plate appearances | |
| Luis Aguayo | 1980–1988 | Shortstop | .240 batting average; 33 home runs; 93 runs batted in | |
| Darrel Akerfelds | 1990–1991 | Pitcher | 7–3 record; 4.29 earned run average; 73 strikeouts | |
| Jack Albright | 1947 | Shortstop | .232 batting average; 2 home runs; 5 runs batted in | |
| Scott Aldred | 1999–2000 | Pitcher | 2–4 record; 4.61 earned run average; 40 strikeouts | |
| Grover Cleveland Alexander^{‡§} (P) | 1911–1917; 1930 | Pitcher | 190–91 record; 2.18 earned run average; 1,409 strikeouts | |
| Antonio Alfonseca | 2007 | Pitcher | 5–2 record; 5.44 earned run average; 24 strikeouts | |
| Bob E. Allen | 1937 | Pitcher | 0–1 record; 6.75 earned run average; 8 strikeouts | |
| Bob G. Allen | 1890–1894 | Shortstop | .237 batting average; 13 home runs; 281 runs batted in | |
| Ethan Allen | 1934–1936 | Left fielder Center fielder | .316 batting average; 19 home runs; 157 runs batted in | |
| Hezekiah Allen | 1884 | Catcher | .667 batting average; 2 hits; 3 plate appearances | |
| Dick Allen^{§} (#15) | 1963–1969; 1975–1976 | First baseman Third baseman Left fielder | .290 batting average; 204 home runs; 655 runs batted in | |
| Bill Almon | 1988 | Third baseman Shortstop | .115 batting average; 2 doubles; 1 run batted in | |
| Porfi Altamirano | 1982–1983 | Pitcher | 7–4 record; 3.92 earned run average; 50 strikeouts | |
| Clemente Álvarez | 2000 | Catcher | .200 batting average; 1 hit; 5 plate appearances | |
| Rubén Amaro, Jr. | 1992–1993; 1996–1998 | Right fielder Left fielder | .239 batting average; 13 home runs; 86 runs batted in | |
| Rubén Amaro, Sr. | 1960–1965 | Shortstop | .241 batting average; 7 home runs; 135 runs batted in | |
| Red Ames | 1919 | Pitcher | 0–2 record; 6.19 earned run average; 4 strikeouts | |
| Larry Andersen | 1983–1986; 1993–1994 | Pitcher | 11–14 record; 3.27 earned run average; 221 strikeouts | |
| Dave Anderson | 1889–1890 | Pitcher | 1–2 record; 7.44 earned run average; 15 strikeouts | |
| Harry Anderson | 1957–1960 | Left fielder | .268 batting average; 59 home runs; 233 runs batted in | |
| John Anderson | 1958 | Pitcher | 7.88 earned run average; 9 strikeouts; 4 walks | |
| Marlon Anderson | 1998–2002 | Second baseman | .266 batting average; 26 home runs; 182 runs batted in | |
| Mike Anderson | 1971–1975; 1979 | Right fielder | .246 batting average; 23 home runs; 102 runs batted in | |
| Sparky Anderson^{†} | 1959 | Second baseman | .218 batting average; 9 doubles; 34 runs batted in | |
| Ed Andrews | 1884–1889 | Center fielder | .261 batting average; 85 doubles; 155 stolen bases | |
| Fred Andrews | 1976–1977 | Second baseman | .276 batting average; 1 triple; 2 runs batted in | |
| Stan Andrews | 1945 | Catcher | .333 batting average; 1 home run; 6 runs batted in | |
| Bill Andrus | 1937 | Third baseman | 3 games played; 2 plate appearances; 2 strikeouts | |
| Joe Antolick | 1944 | Catcher | .333 batting average; 2 hits; 6 plate appearances | |
| John Antonelli | 1945 | Third baseman | .256 batting average; 1 home run; 28 runs batted in | |
| Mark Appel | 2022 | Pitcher | | |
| Alex Arias | 1998–2000 | Shortstop | .272 batting average; 7 home runs; 79 runs batted in | |
| Buzz Arlett | 1931 | Right fielder | .313 batting average; 18 home runs; 72 runs batted in | |
| Morrie Arnovich | 1936–1940 | Left fielder | .288 batting average; 20 home runs; 218 runs batted in | |
| Richie Ashburn^{‡§} (#1) | 1948–1959 | Center fielder | .311 batting average; 1,811 singles*; 499 runs batted in | |
| Andy Ashby | 1991–1992; 2000 | Pitcher | 6–15 record; 6.14 earned run average; 101 strikeouts | |
| Dick Attreau | 1926–1927 | First baseman | .215 batting average; 1 home run; 16 runs batted in | |
| Bill Atwood | 1936–1940 | Catcher | .229 batting average; 7 home runs; 112 runs batted in | |
| Earl Averill, Jr. | 1963 | Catcher | .268 batting average; 3 home runs; 8 runs batted in | |
| Ramón Avilés | 1979–1981 | Second baseman Shortstop | .268 batting average; 2 home runs; 24 runs batted in | |
| Bob Ayrault | 1992–1993 | Pitcher | 4–2 record; 4.36 earned run average; 35 strikeouts | |

== Footnotes ==
Key

- ^{H} The National Baseball Hall of Fame and Museum determines which cap a player wears on their plaque, signifying "the team with which he made his most indelible mark". The Hall of Fame considers the player's wishes in making their decision, but the Hall makes the final decision as "it is important that the logo be emblematic of the historical accomplishments of that player’s career".
- ^{P} Players are listed at a position if they appeared in 30% of their games or more during their Phillies career, as defined by Baseball-Reference. Additional positions may be shown on the Baseball-Reference website by following each player's citation.
- ^{R} Franchise batting and pitching leaders are drawn from Baseball-Reference. A total of 1,500 plate appearances are needed to qualify for batting records, and 500 innings pitched or 50 decisions are required to qualify for pitching records.
- ^{S} Statistics are correct as of the end of the 2010 Major League Baseball season.
