= Willie Jones (third baseman) =

American baseball player (1925–1983)

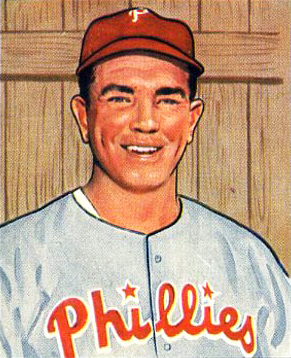
- Jones' 1950 baseball card from Bowman Gum
- Third baseman
- Born: August 16, 1925; Dillon, South Carolina, U.S.
- Died: October 18, 1983 (aged 58); Cincinnati, Ohio, U.S.
- Batted: Right Threw: Right

MLB debut
- September 10, 1947, for the Philadelphia Phillies

Last MLB appearance
- May 7, 1961, for the Cincinnati Reds

MLB statistics
- Batting average: .258
- Home runs: 190
- Runs batted in: 812
- Stats at Baseball Reference

Teams
- Philadelphia Phillies (1947–1959); Cleveland Indians (1959); Cincinnati Reds (1959–1961)

Career highlights and awards
- 2× All-Star (1950, 1951); Philadelphia Phillies Wall of Fame

Willie Edward Jones (August 16, 1925 – October 18, 1983), nicknamed "Puddin' Head", was an American professional baseball third baseman who played in Major League Baseball (MLB) for the Philadelphia Phillies (1947–1959), Cleveland Indians (1959), and Cincinnati Reds (1959–1961). He batted and threw right-handed.

In a 15-season career, Jones was a .258 hitter with 190 home runs and 812 runs batted in (RBI) in 1,691 games played. Defensively, he recorded a .963 fielding percentage.

== Early life ==
Jones was born on August 16, 1925, in Dillon, South Carolina. Jones, his brother and sister grew up and lived in the small farm and mill community of Laurel Hill, North Carolina. His father, W. H. Jones, was a master mechanic. Jones attended Laurel Hill High School. He also played American Legion baseball during the summers in Bennettsville, South Carolina. Jones went on to serve his country in the United States Navy during World War II.

Jones was given his nickname "Puddin' head" at a young age from a popular 1930s song, "Woodenhead, Puddin' head Jones", though his family called him Ed or Edward (his middle name).

== Minor league baseball ==
After the war, Jones played semi-pro baseball for the Bennettsville team in the Palmetto League, with a batting average over .500. His play attracted attention from professional baseball scouts, and Johnny Nee signed Jones to a contract with the Phillies, with a $16,500 signing bonus in late 1946.

In 1947, after showing up in training camp out of shape, he was assigned to the Terre Haute Phillies of the Class-B Triple-I league, where he had a .307 batting average, with 10 home runs, 9 triples, 37 doubles, 107 runs batted in (RBI), 99 runs scored, and an .854 OPS (on-base plus slugging). He played shortstop that year and had a .928 fielding percentage. He made the league's All-Star team at shortstop. In 1947, he also started 17 games at third base for the Philadelphia Phillies.

In 1948, he played his last year of minor league baseball, mainly with the Toronto Maple Leafs of the Triple-A International League, batting .275 in 118 games. He was moved to third base where he had a .936 fielding percentage. He played under his future Phillies manager Eddie Sawyer, and was named to the league's All-Star team at third base. He again started 17 games for the Philadelphia Phillies at third base, hitting .333 in sixty at bats.

== Major league baseball ==
By 1949, he became the team's starting third baseman, and held that position until 1959. Jones was the top fielding third baseman in the National League (NL) during the 1950s. He led the league in fielding percentage six times, in putouts for seven years (also tying a record), and twice each in assists and double plays.

In 1949, he had 19 home runs, and hit four doubles in one game. He had .948 fielding percentage (fourth best in the National League), and led all National League third basemen in games played, put outs and assists. He also led all major league third basemen in errors. Jones came in 27th for Most Valuable Player (MVP) voting in 1949.

Jones' most productive season came as a member of the fabulous 1950 "Whiz Kids" National League champion team, when he posted career-highs in home runs (25), RBIs (88), runs (100), hits (163), and led the league in games played (157). Many of those home runs came at key times during games. His 16-game hit streak to begin that campaign was a franchise record that stood for 73 years until Bryson Stott surpassed it on April 18, 2023. He hit .286 in the World Series, which the New York Yankees won 4–0. He was generally acknowledge as the NL's best third baseman.

His .954 fielding percentage was third in the National League in 1950, and he again led the league in put outs, and led all major league third basemen in games played and assists. He was the starting third baseman and leadoff hitter in the 1950 All-Star Game, where he went 1 for 7; the seven at bats being the most by a player in an All-Star Game. He was 36th in MVP voting.

In 1951, Jones hit 22 home runs with 81 RBIs and a career-high .285 batting average. He was again selected for the All-Star Game. His .966 fielding percentage was third best in the National League, and he led the league in double plays and games played by a third baseman.

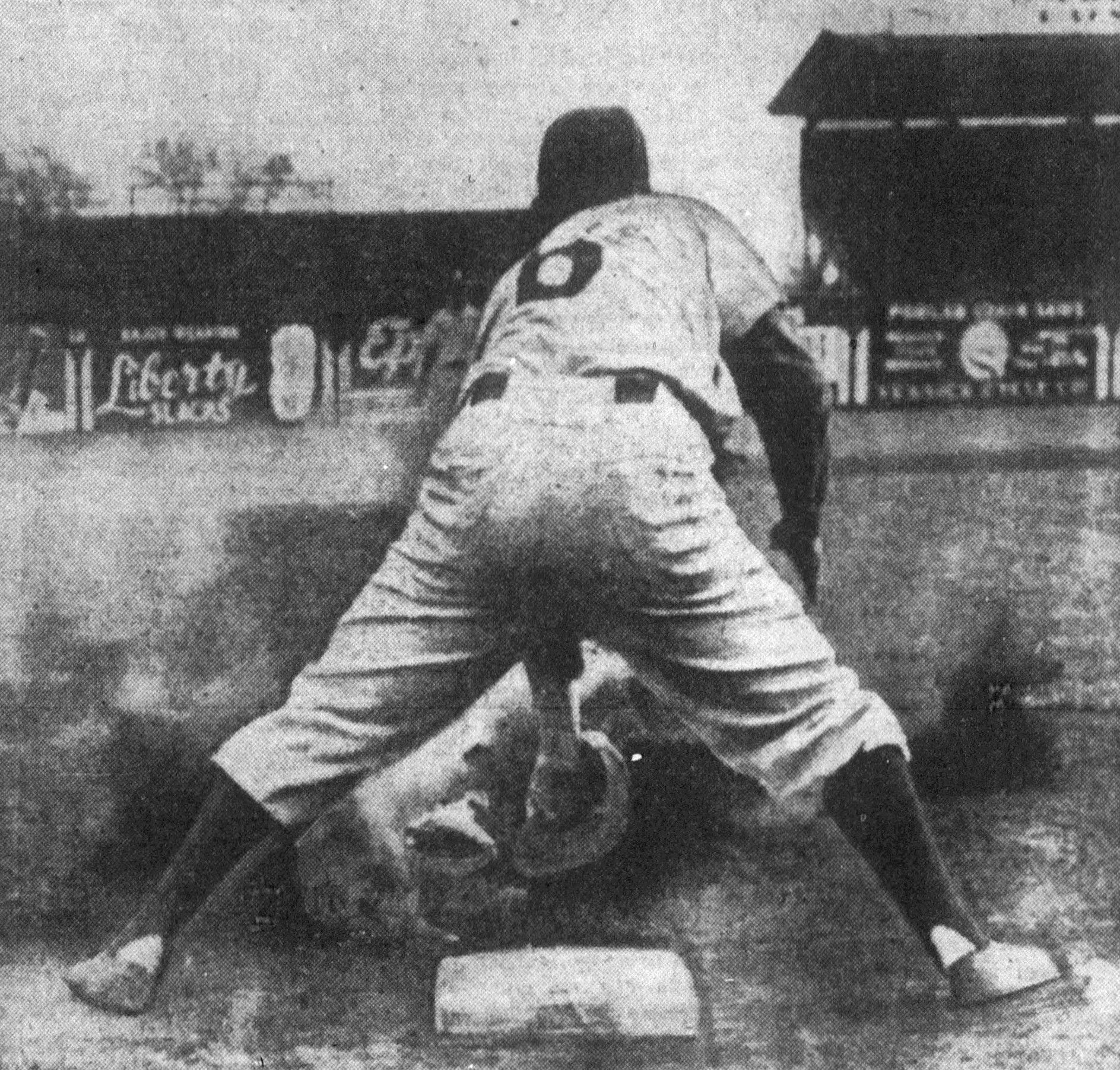
Jones tags Birmingham Barons' Russ Snyder during exhibition on April 4, 1954 at Rickwood Field

From 1952 to 1958 he led all National League third baseman in fielding percentage, except in 1957 when he was second. In 1953 and 1958, he led all major league third basemen in fielding percentage. From 1952-56, he led the major leagues in put outs by a third baseman, except for 1953 (where he still led the National League in put outs). In 1952, he led the National League in double plays by a third baseman.

The Gold Glove fielding award did not exist until 1957, or it is possible Jones would have received this award. Hall of Fame pitcher Robin Roberts, who played with Jones in Philadelphia, and with 16-time gold glove third baseman Brooks Robinson in Baltimore, said that Jones was the second-best fielding third baseman he had ever seen (behind Robinson). In 1958, the first National Leaguer to win the gold glove at third base was Ken Boyer, who was third in NL fielding percentage that year; Jones being first among all major league third basemen.

In 13 seasons with the Phillies, Jones hit .258, with 180 home runs, 753 RBIs, 735 runs scored, 693 bases on balls (compared to only 493 strikeouts), and a .756 OPS.

In June of the 1959 season, the Phillies traded Jones to the Cleveland Indians for Jim Bolger and cash. Jones had a .269 batting average at the time, and had started 46 games for the Phillies. After appearing in only 11 games for Cleveland, his rights were sold to the Cincinnati Reds less than one month later. He finished the season with the Reds, batting .249 with seven home runs in 72 games. On the year as a whole, he hit .255, with 14 home runs, 56 RBIs, 57 runs and a .753 OPS. Also, on the whole for 1959, he was second among National League third basemen in fielding percentage. His playing time was significantly reduced in 1960 for the Reds, and the Reds released him in May of 1961, his final year in the major leagues.

== Honors ==
In conjunction with the celebration of the centennial of Major League Baseball in 1969, a Phillies all-time great team was selected by a fan vote for which Jones was named the team's all-time third baseman. The players were honored on August 5, 1969, at Connie Mack Stadium before the Phillies' game against the San Francisco Giants.

Jones is a member of the Phillies Wall of Fame.

== Personal life ==
Jones was married to Carolyn (Goodson) Jones, whom he met while playing in Bennettsville, with whom he had three children, Eddie, Kathie, and Bradley. The marriage ended in divorce.

== Death ==
On October 18, 1983, Jones died at the age of 58, of cancer in Cincinnati, Ohio — where he had lived after his playing days were over.

== Highlights ==
- Twice All-Star (1950–51)
- Tied a major league record with four straight doubles in a game (April 20, 1949)
- His six career grand slams as a Phillie ties him for third place behind Mike Schmidt and Ryan Howard
- His 2,045 career putouts are 11th-highest in major league history (as of 2025)
- Compiled a career 1.39 walk-to-strikeout ratio (755-to-541)
- Eight RBI in a game
