= List of Philadelphia Phillies award winners and league leaders =

This is a list of award winners and league leaders for the Philadelphia Phillies professional baseball team.

== Award winners ==
=== Most Valuable Player (NL) ===
Note: This award was known as the Kenesaw Mountain Landis Memorial Baseball Award 1944-2019.
See footnotes.

- Chuck Klein (1932)
- Jim Konstanty (1950)
- Mike Schmidt (1980, 1981, 1986)
- Ryan Howard (2006)
- Jimmy Rollins (2007)
- Bryce Harper (2021)

=== Cy Young Award (NL) ===
See footnotes

- Steve Carlton (1972, 1977, 1980, 1982)
- John Denny (1983)
- Steve Bedrosian (1987)
- Roy Halladay (2010)

=== Rookie of the Year Award (NL) ===
Note: This was renamed the Jackie Robinson Award in 1987.
See footnote.

- Jack Sanford (1957)
- Dick Allen (1964)
- Scott Rolen (1997)
- Ryan Howard (2005)

=== Manager of the Year Award (NL) ===
See footnotes.

- Larry Bowa (2001)

=== Rawlings Gold Glove Award (NL) ===
See footnote.

Pitcher

See also: List of Gold Glove Award winners at pitcher § National League winners
- Bobby Shantz (1964)
- Jim Kaat (1976, 1977)
- Steve Carlton (1981)
- Zack Wheeler (2023)

Catcher

See also: List of Gold Glove Award winners at catcher § National League winners
- Bob Boone (1978, 1979)
- Mike Lieberthal (1999)
- J. T. Realmuto (2019, 2022)

First base

See also: List of Gold Glove Award winners at first base § National League winners
- Bill White (1966)

Second base

See also: List of Gold Glove Award winners at second base § National League winners
- Manny Trillo (1979, 1981, 1982)

Third base

See also: List of Gold Glove Award winners at third base § National League winners
- Mike Schmidt (1976, 1977, 1978, 1979, 1980, 1981, 1982, 1983, 1984, 1986)
- Scott Rolen (1998, 2000, 2001)
- Placido Polanco (2011)

Shortstop

See also: List of Gold Glove Award winners at shortstop § National League winners
- Bobby Wine (1963)
- Ruben Amaro Sr. (1964)
- Larry Bowa (1972, 1978)
- Jimmy Rollins (2007, 2008, 2009, 2012)

Outfield

See also: List of Gold Glove Award winners at outfield § National League winners

See footnote

- Garry Maddox (1975, 1976, 1977, 1978, 1979, 1980, 1981, 1982)
- Bobby Abreu (2005)
- Aaron Rowand (2007)
- Shane Victorino (2008, 2009, 2010)

=== All-MLB Team ===
==== First team ====
Starting pitcher

- Cristopher Sánchez (2026)

Relief pitcher

- Jhoan Durán (2025)

Catcher

- J. T. Realmuto (2019, 2022)

Outfield

- Bryce Harper (2021)

==== Second team ====
Starting pitcher

- Aaron Nola (2022)
- Cristopher Sánchez (2025)
- Zack Wheeler (2021, 2025)
- Jesús Luzardo (2026)

Designated hitter

- Kyle Schwarber (2025)

Catcher

- J. T. Realmuto (2021)

Outfield

- Kyle Schwarber (2022)

=== Wilson Defensive Player of the Year Award ===
Note: In its first two years, the award was given to a player on each MLB team; one awardee was then named the Overall Defensive Player of the Year for the American League and another for the National League. Starting in 2014, the award is now given to one player at each position for all of Major League Baseball; one of the nine awardees is then named the Overall Defensive Player of the Year for all of Major League Baseball.
Team (all positions)

- Carlos Ruiz (2012, 2013)

=== Silver Slugger Award (NL) ===
See footnotes

Catcher

See also: List of Silver Slugger Award winners at catcher § National League winners
- Darren Daulton (1992)
- J. T. Realmuto (2019, 2022)

First base

See also: List of Silver Slugger Award winners at first base § National League winners
- Pete Rose (1981)
- Ryan Howard (2006)
- Bryce Harper (2024)

Second base

See also: List of Silver Slugger Award winners at second base § National League winners
- Manny Trillo (1980, 1981)
- Juan Samuel (1987)
- Chase Utley (2006, 2007, 2008, 2009)

Third base

See also: List of Silver Slugger Award winners at third base § National League winners
- Mike Schmidt (1980, 1981, 1982, 1983, 1984, 1986)
- Scott Rolen (2002)

Shortstop

See also: List of Silver Slugger Award winners at shortstop § National League winners
- Jimmy Rollins (2007)

Outfield

See also: List of Silver Slugger Award winners at outfield § National League winners

See footnote

- Lenny Dykstra (1993)
- Bobby Abreu (2004)
- Bryce Harper (2021)
- Kyle Schwarber (2022)

Designated Hitter

See also: List of Silver Slugger Award winners at designated hitter § National League winners
- Bryce Harper (2023)
- Kyle Schwarber (2026)

=== Hank Aaron Award (NL) ===
See footnote.

- Ryan Howard (2006)
- Bryce Harper (2021)

=== Rolaids Relief Man Award (NL) ===
See footnote

- Al Holland (1983)
- Steve Bedrosian (1987)
- Brad Lidge (2008)

=== MLB Delivery Man of the Year Award ===
Note: Awarded to one player in Major League Baseball (not one for each league).
See footnote

- Brad Lidge (2008)

=== MLB Comeback Player of the Year Award (NL) ===
- Brad Lidge (2008)
- Zack Wheeler (2026)

=== MLB Clutch Performer of the Year Award ===
Note: Awarded to one player in Major League Baseball (not one for each league).
See footnote and Baseball awards § United States major leagues: Awards by Major League Baseball (MLB)

- Roy Halladay (2010)

=== Roberto Clemente Award ===
Note: Awarded to one player in Major League Baseball (not one for each league).

- Greg Luzinski (1978)
- Garry Maddox (1986)
- Jimmy Rollins (2014)

=== MLB "This Year in Baseball Awards" ===
Note: These awards were re-named the "GIBBY Awards" (Greatness in Baseball Yearly) in 2010 and then the "Esurance MLB Awards" in 2015.
Note: Voted by five groups as the best in all of Major League Baseball (i.e., not two awards, one for each league).

==== "This Year in Baseball Awards" Starting Pitcher of the Year ====
- Roy Halladay (2010)

==== "This Year in Baseball Awards" Closer of the Year ====
See footnote

- Brad Lidge (2008)

==== "This Year in Baseball Awards" Rookie of the Year ====
- J. A. Happ (2009)

==== "This Year in Baseball Awards" X-Factor Player of the Year ====
Note: In 2009, this was named "Unsung Player of the Year".

- Jayson Werth (2009)
- Carlos Ruiz (2010)

==== "This Year in Baseball Awards" Executive of the Year ====
- Pat Gillick (2008)
- Rubén Amaro, Jr. (2009)

==== "This Year in Baseball Awards" Manager of the Year ====
See footnote

- Charlie Manuel (2008)

==== "This Year in Baseball Awards" Postseason Moment of the Year ====
- Chase Utley (2008)
- Roy Halladay (2010)

=== Major League Triple Crown: Pitching ===
- Grover Cleveland Alexander (1915)

=== Triple Crown (NL): Batting ===
- Chuck Klein (1933)

=== Triple Crown (NL): Pitching ===
- Grover Cleveland Alexander (1915, 1916)
- Steve Carlton (1972)

=== NL All-Stars ===
For list of Phillies' All-Stars (1933–present), see footnote

=== World Series MVP Award ===
- Mike Schmidt (1980)
- Cole Hamels (2008)

=== NLCS MVP Award ===
- Manny Trillo (1980)
- Gary Matthews (1983)
- Curt Schilling (1993)
- Cole Hamels (2008)
- Ryan Howard (2009)
- Bryce Harper (2022)

=== All-Star Game MVP Award ===
Note: This was renamed the Ted Williams Most Valuable Player Award in 2002.

- Johnny Callison (1964)
- Kyle Schwarber (2025)

=== All-Star Game—Home Run Derby champion ===
- Bobby Abreu (2005)
- Ryan Howard (2006)

=== Major League Baseball All-Century Team (1999) ===
- Pete Rose (one of 10 outfielders)
- Mike Schmidt (one of two third basemen)

=== DHL Hometown Heroes (2006) ===
- Mike Schmidt — voted by MLB fans as the most outstanding player in the history of the franchise, based on on-field performance, leadership quality and character value

=== Player of the Month (NL) ===
- Jim Bunning (June 1964)
- Greg Luzinski (June 1973, July 1977)
- Mike Schmidt (April 1976, July 1979, May 1980, July 1982)
- Pete Rose (September 1979, August 1981)
- Gary Matthews (September 1981)
- Von Hayes (April 1989)
- Lenny Dykstra (May 1994)
- Jim Thome (September 2003, June 2004)
- Bobby Abreu (May 2005)
- Chase Utley (July 2006, April 2008)
- Ryan Howard (August 2006, September 2006, September 2008, August 2009)
- Domonic Brown (May 2013)
- Kyle Schwarber (June 2022)

=== Pitcher of the Month (NL) ===
- Larry Christenson (September 1977)
- Steve Carlton (May 1980)
- Marty Bystrom (September 1980)
- Dick Ruthven (May 1982)
- John Denny (September 1983)
- Shane Rawley (August 1985)
- Steve Bedrosian (May 1987)
- Mitch Williams (August 1991)
- Tommy Greene (May 1993)
- Bobby Muñoz (June 1994)
- Heathcliff Slocumb (May 1995)
- Sid Fernandez (August 1995)
- Curt Schilling (May 1999)
- Roy Halladay (July 2010)
- Cliff Lee (June 2011, August 2011)
- Zack Wheeler (May 2022, June 2025)
- Ranger Suarez (April 2024)
- Cristopher Sanchez (June 2024)

=== Reliever of the Month (NL) ===
- Hector Neris (August 2018)
- Craig Kimbrel (August 2023)

=== Rookie of the Month (NL) ===
- Ryan Howard (September 2005)
- Maikel Franco (June 2015)
- Rhys Hoskins (August 2017)

=== Frank Slocum Big B.A.T. Award ===
- Brad Lidge (2010)

=== Fishel Award (for public-relations excellence) ===
- Larry Shenk (1983)

=== Major League Baseball All-Time Team (1997; Baseball Writers' Association of America) ===
- Mike Schmidt (first team; third baseman)

=== Baseball's 100 Greatest Players (1998; The Sporting News) ===
See footnote

- No. 25 – Pete Rose
- No. 28 – Mike Schmidt
- No. 30 – Steve Carlton

=== Sports Illustrated MLB All-Decade Team ===
- Chase Utley, second base (2009)

=== Players Choice Awards Player of the Year ===
Note: Awarded by fellow major-league players to one player in Major League Baseball (not one for each league), including all positions. The Players Choice Awards do not have a Pitcher of the Year award.

- Ryan Howard (2006)

=== Baseball America Major League Player of the Year ===
Note: Awarded to one player in Major League Baseball (not one for each league), including all positions. Baseball America does not have a Pitcher of the Year award.

- Roy Halladay (2010)

=== Best Major League Baseball Player ESPY Award ===
Note: Awarded to one player in Major League Baseball (not one for each league), including all positions. The ESPYs do not have a Pitcher of the Year award.

- Roy Halladay (2011) – presented in June 2011, for his performance since June 2010

=== Sporting News Player of the Year Award ===
Note: Awarded to one player in Major League Baseball (not one for each league). Sporting News also has a Pitcher of the Year award in each league.

- Robin Roberts (1952)
- Ryan Howard (2006)

=== Baseball Digest Player of the Year ===
Note: Awarded to one position player in Major League Baseball (not one for each league) since 1994, when Baseball Digest started its Pitcher of the Year award.

- Mike Schmidt (1981)
- Jimmy Rollins (2007)

=== NLBM Oscar Charleston Legacy Award (NL MVP) ===
- Ryan Howard (2006)
- Jimmy Rollins (2007)

=== The Sporting News NL Most Valuable Player Award ===
Note: Discontinued in 1946

- Chuck Klein (1931, 1932)

=== Baseball Digest Pitcher of the Year ===
Note: Awarded to one pitcher in Major League Baseball (not one in each league).

- Roy Halladay (2010)

=== Players Choice Awards NL Outstanding Player ===
- Ryan Howard (2006)

=== Players Choice Awards NL Outstanding Pitcher ===
- Roy Halladay (2010)

=== Baseball Prospectus Internet Baseball Awards NL Cy Young ===
- Roy Halladay (2010)

=== NLBM Wilbur "Bullet" Rogan Legacy Award (NL Pitcher of the Year) ===
- Roy Halladay (2010)

=== Sporting News NL Pitcher of the Year Award ===
- Jim Konstanty (1950)
- Robin Roberts (1952, 1955)
- Steve Carlton (1972, 1977, 1980, 1982)
- John Denny (1983)
- Roy Halladay (2010)

=== USA Today NL Cy Young ===
- Roy Halladay (2010)

=== Sporting News NL Reliever of the Year Award ===
See footnote

==== TSN NL Fireman of the Year Award (1960–2000; for closers) ====
- Al Holland (1983; co-winner)
- Steve Bedrosian (1987)

==== SN NL Reliever of the Year Award (2001–present; for all relievers) ====
- Brad Lidge (2008)

=== Players Choice Awards NL Outstanding Rookie ===
- 1997 – Scott Rolen
- 2009 – J. A. Happ

=== NLBM Larry Doby Legacy Award (NL Rookie of the Year) ===
- Ryan Howard (2005)

=== Sporting News NL Rookie of the Year Award ===
Note: In 1961 and from 1963 through 2003, TSN split the rookie award into two separate categories: Rookie Pitcher of the Year and Rookie Player of the Year. Also, for the first three years (1946–1948) and in 1950, there was a single award, for all of MLB.

- 1946 – Del Ennis (in MLB)
- 1948 – Richie Ashburn (in MLB)
- 1957 – Jack Sanford
- 1964 – Dick Allen (Rookie Player of the Year)
- 1980 – Lonnie Smith (Rookie Player of the Year)
- 1984 – Juan Samuel (Rookie Player of the Year)
- 1997 – Scott Rolen (Rookie Player of the Year)
- 2009 – J. A. Happ (2009)

=== Baseball Prospectus Internet Baseball Awards NL Rookie of the Year ===
- 2005 – Ryan Howard

=== Baseball America All-Rookie Team ===
- 2009 – J. A. Happ (P; one of five pitchers)
- 2011 – Vance Worley (SP; one of five starting pitchers)

=== Topps All-Star Rookie teams ===
Note: Each year's team includes one left-handed pitcher, one right-handed pitcher, and three outfielders.

- 1959 – Joe Koppe (SS)
- 1960 – Jimmie Coker (C), Tony Curry (OF)
- 1963 – Ray Culp (RHP)
- 1964 – Richie Allen (3B)
- 1969 – Don Money (SS), Larry Hisle (OF)
- 1970 – Larry Bowa (SS)
- 1971 – Willie Montañez (OF)
- 1972 – Tom Hutton (1B)
- 1973 – Bob Boone (C)
- 1975 – Tom Underwood (LHP)
- 1980 – Lonnie Smith (OF)
- 1984 – Juan Samuel (2B)
- 1986 – Bruce Ruffin (LHP)
- 1997 – Scott Rolen (3B)
- 2000 – Pat Burrell (1B)
- 2001 – Jimmy Rollins (SS)
- 2007 – Carlos Ruiz (C)
- 2009 – J. A. Happ (LHP)
- 2016 – Tommy Joseph (1B)
- 2018 – Jorge Alfaro (C)
- 2020 – Alec Bohm (3B)

=== Babe Ruth Home Run Award ===
Note: Awarded to the leader(s) in Major League Baseball (not one for each league).

- Jim Thome (2003; co-winner)
- Ryan Howard (2006, 2008)

=== NLBM Josh Gibson Legacy Award (NL home-run leader) ===
- Ryan Howard (2006, 2008)

=== NLBM James "Cool Papa" Bell Legacy Award (NL stolen-base leader) ===
- Jimmy Rollins (2001; co-winner)

=== Fielding Bible Award ===
Second base

- Chase Utley (2010)

Shortstop

- Jimmy Rollins (2008)

=== Players Choice Awards NL Comeback Player ===
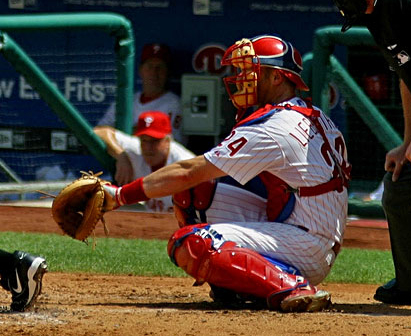
Mike Lieberthal

- Darren Daulton (1997)
- Mike Lieberthal (2002, tied with John Smoltz)

=== Sporting News NL Comeback Player of the Year Award ===
- John Denny (1983)
- Darren Daulton (1997)
- Mike Lieberthal (2002)

=== Associated Press Comeback Player of the Year Award ===
- Eddie Waitkus (1950)

=== Babe Ruth Award (postseason MVP) ===
- Tug McGraw (1980)
- Cole Hamels (2008)

=== MLB Insiders Club Magazine All-Postseason Team ===
- 2011 – Jimmy Rollins (SS), Roy Halladay (SP; one of three)

=== Sporting News Top 50 Players ===
- 2009 – Chase Utley (#6), Ryan Howard (#11), Jimmy Rollins (#15), and Cole Hamels (#49)

=== Players Choice Awards Marvin Miller Man of the Year ===
Note: Awarded by fellow major-league players as the Man of the Year in Major League Baseball (not one for each league).

- Jim Thome (2004)

=== Lou Gehrig Memorial Award ===
- Robin Roberts (1962; while with the Baltimore Orioles)
- Mike Schmidt (1983)
- Curt Schilling (1995)
- Jim Thome (2004)
- Shane Victorino (2008)

=== Heart & Hustle Award ===
Note: Awarded by the Major League Baseball Players Alumni Association

- Roy Halladay (2010)

=== Tony Conigliaro Award ===
- Jim Eisenreich (1990)
- Dickie Thon (1991)

=== Branch Rickey Award ===
- Shane Victorino (2011)

=== Tip O'Neill Award ===
Note: For Canadian players only.

- Dave Shipanoff (1985)

=== Sporting News Manager of the Year Award ===
Note: Established in 1936, this award was given annually to one manager in Major League Baseball. In 1986 it was expanded to honor one manager from each league.
See footnote

- Danny Ozark (1976) (in both leagues)
- Larry Bowa (2001) (in NL)

=== Associated Press Manager of the Year Award ===
Note: Discontinued in 2001. From 1959 to 1983, the award was given annually to one manager in each league. From 1984 to 2000, the award was given to one manager in all of Major League Baseball.
See footnote

- Eddie Sawyer (1950) (in both leagues)
- Gene Mauch (1962, 1964) (in NL)
- Danny Ozark (1976) (in NL)
- Jim Fregosi (1993) (in both leagues)

=== Baseball Prospectus Internet Baseball Awards NL Manager of the Year ===
See footnote

- Larry Bowa (2001)

=== Chuck Tanner Major League Baseball Manager of the Year Award ===
See footnote

- Charlie Manuel (2010)

=== Sporting News Executive of the Year Award ===
- Bob Carpenter (1949)
- Lee Thomas (1993)

== Team award ==
- 1915 – National League pennant
- 1950 – National League pennant
- 1980 – Warren C. Giles Trophy (National League champion)
- 1980 – World Series Trophy
- 1981 (1980 Phillies) – John Wanamaker Athletic Award (Philadelphia Sports Congress)
- 1983 – Warren C. Giles Trophy (National League champion)
- 1993 – Warren C. Giles Trophy (National League champion)
- 1994 (1993 Phillies) – John Wanamaker Athletic Award (Philadelphia Sports Congress)
- 2007 – Philadelphia Sports Writers Association "Team of the Year"
- 2007 (induction of the 1980 Phillies) – Philadelphia Sports Hall of Fame
- 2008 – Warren C. Giles Trophy (National League champion)
- 2008 – Commissioner's Trophy (World Series)
- 2008 – Pride of Philadelphia Award (Philadelphia Sports Hall of Fame)
- 2008 – Philadelphia Sports Writers Association "Team of the Year"
- 2009 (2008 Phillies) – John Wanamaker Athletic Award (Philadelphia Sports Congress)
- 2009 – Warren C. Giles Trophy (National League champion)
- 2009 – Baseball America Organization of the Year
- 2009 – No. 33 on Sports Illustrated list of Top Franchises of the Decade (in MLB, NBA, NFL, NHL, college basketball, and college football)
- 2009 – Philadelphia Sports Writers Association "Team of the Year"
- 2011 – Philadelphia Sports Writers Association "Team of the Year"
- 2016 – Best Farm System MiLBY Award
- 2022 – Warren C. Giles Trophy (National League champion)

| Preceded by Pittsburgh Pirates 1979; Boston Red Sox 2007 | World Series Champions; Philadelphia Phillies; 1980; 2008 | Succeeded by Los Angeles Dodgers 1981; New York Yankees 2009 |
| Preceded by Boston Braves 1914; Brooklyn Dodgers 1949; Pittsburgh Pirates 1979; St. Louis Cardinals 1982; Atlanta Braves 1992; Colorado Rockies 2007; Atlanta Braves 2022 | National League Champions; Philadelphia Phillies; 1915; 1950; 1980; 1983; 1993; 2008 and 2009; 2022 | Succeeded by Brooklyn Dodgers 1916; Brooklyn Dodgers 1951; Los Angeles Dodgers 1981; San Diego Padres 1984; Atlanta Braves 1995; San Francisco Giants 2010; Arizona Diamondbacks 2023 |
| Preceded by Pittsburgh Pirates 1975; Pittsburgh Pirates 1979; St. Louis Cardinals 1982; Pittsburgh Pirates 1992; New York Mets 2006; Atlanta Braves 2023 | NL Eastern Division Champions; Philadelphia Phillies; 1976, 1977 and 1978; 1980; 1983; 1993; 2007, 2008, 2009, 2010, and 2011; 2024 | Succeeded by Pittsburgh Pirates 1979; Montreal Expos 1981; Chicago Cubs 1984; Atlanta Braves 1995; Washington Nationals 2012 |

== Other achievements ==
=== Phillies all-time team (1969) ===
In conjunction with Major League Baseball's celebration in 1969 of the 100th anniversary of professional baseball, the Phillies conducted a fan vote to determine their all-time team. The players were honored on August 5, 1969, at Connie Mack Stadium before the Phillies' game against the San Francisco Giants. The players were as follows:

- Andy Seminick, C
- Eddie Waitkus, 1B
- Cookie Rojas, 2B
- Granny Hamner, SS
- Willie Jones, 3B
- Chuck Klein, RF
- Del Ennis, OF
- Richie Ashburn, CF
- Robin Roberts, RHP
- Chris Short, LHP

Roberts was also honored as the greatest Phillies player of all time.

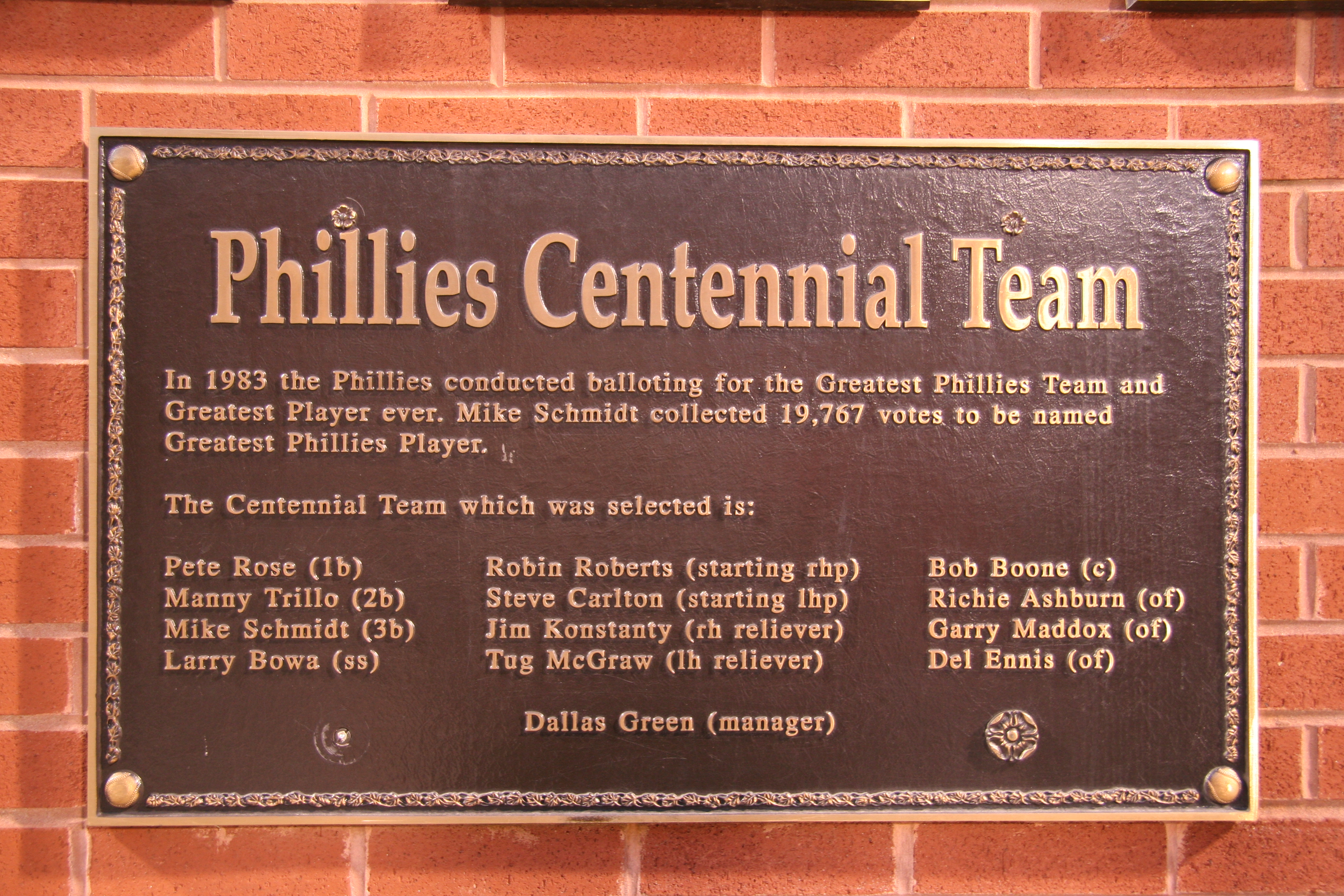
The Centennial Team plaque at the left end of the Wall of Fame

=== Centennial Team (1983) ===
- In 1983, rather than inducting a player into the Wall of Fame, the Phillies selected their Centennial Team, commemorating the best players of the first 100 years in franchise history. See Philadelphia Baseball Wall of Fame#Centennial Team.

=== Phillies All-Vet Team (2003) ===
As part of the Final Innings festivities at Veterans Stadium, the Phillies announced the result of an online fan vote to determine their "All-Vet" team (1971–2003). The players were honored on September 27, 2003, prior to the penultimate game at the stadium, which the Phillies went on to win against the Atlanta Braves 7–6. The players were as follows:

- Darren Daulton, C
- John Kruk, 1B
- Juan Samuel, 2B
- Larry Bowa, SS
- Mike Schmidt, 3B
- Bobby Abreu, RF
- Greg Luzinski, LF
- Garry Maddox, CF
- Curt Schilling, RHP
- Steve Carlton, LHP

Schilling was playing for the Arizona Diamondbacks and was unavailable for the ceremony. All the other honorees attended, including Tug McGraw, who was recovering from brain surgery.

=== Dallas Green Award (scouting) ===
- Bill Harper (2012)

=== Richie Ashburn Special Achievement Award ===
See footnote

- Jerry Clothier (2011)

=== Ford C. Frick Award (broadcasters) ===
Note: Names with asterisks received the award based primarily on their work as Phillies broadcasters.

- By Saam (1990)*
- Herb Carneal (1996)
- Harry Kalas (2002)*

=== BBWAA Career Excellence Award (baseball writers) ===
- James Isaminger (Philadelphia Inquirer) (1974)
- Allen Lewis (Philadelphia Inquirer) (1981)
- Ray Kelly (Philadelphia Bulletin) (1988)
- Bus Saidt (The Trentonian and Trenton Times) (1992)
- Bill Conlin (Philadelphia Daily News) (2011)

=== Honor Rolls of Baseball (writers) ===
- Frank Hough (Philadelphia Inquirer) (1946)

=== Philadelphia Chapter / BBWAA awards ===
- Mike Schmidt Most Valuable Player Award
- Steve Carlton Most Valuable Pitcher Award
- Dallas Green Special Achievement Award
- Tug McGraw Good Guy Award
- Charlie Manuel Award for Service and Passion to Baseball

=== World Baseball Classic All-WBC Team ===
- 2009 – Jimmy Rollins (shortstop) (2009 World Baseball Classic § All–WBC team)

=== All-American Amateur Baseball Association Hall of Fame ===
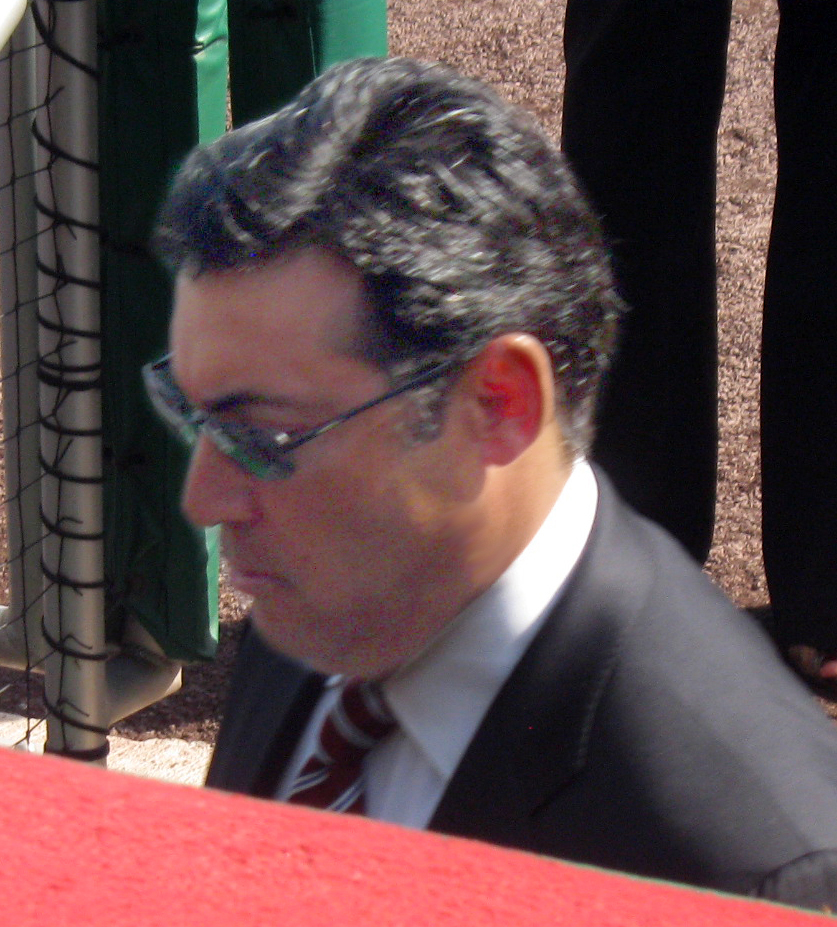
Rubén Amaro, Jr.

See: All-American Amateur Baseball Association Hall of Fame

- Rubén Amaro, Jr. (2008)

=== Arizona Fall League Hall of Fame ===
- Jimmy Rollins (2008)
- Ryan Howard (2011)
- Chase Utley (2015)

=== Hispanic Heritage Baseball Museum Hall of Fame ===
- Cookie Rojas (2011)
- Juan Samuel (2010)
- Tony Taylor (2004)

=== Irish American Baseball Hall of Fame ===
- Tug McGraw (2008)

=== Peter J. McGovern Little League Museum Hall of Excellence ===
- Mike Schmidt (1991)

=== Associated Press Athlete of the Year ===
- Jim Konstanty (1950)

=== Sporting News Pro Athlete of the Year ===
- Roy Halladay (2010)

=== Hickok Belt ===
Note: The Hickok Belt trophy was awarded to the top professional athlete of the year in the U.S., from 1950 to 1976. It was re-established in 2012.

- Steve Carlton (1972)

=== Sports Illustrated Top 10 GMs/Executives of the Decade (2009) ===
- No. 7 – Pat Gillick, Seattle Mariners/Philadelphia Phillies (the list's only other MLB GMs were Boston's Theo Epstein, No. 3, and Oakland's Billy Beane, No. 10)

=== Delaware Sports Museum and Hall of Fame ===
- 1978 – Bob Carpenter
- 1979 – Chris Short
- 1980 – Huck Betts
- 1983 – Dallas Green
- 1987 – Ruly Carpenter
- 1992 – Harry "the Horse" Walter Anderson

=== Pennsylvania Sports Hall of Fame ===
- 1966 – Robin Roberts
- 1968 – Curt Simmons
- 1972 – Richie Ashburn
- 1972 - Ken Raffensberger
- 1975 – Del Ennis
- 1986 – Eddie Sawyer
- 1988 – Art Mahaffey
- 1996 – Dick Allen
- 2003 – Lee Elia
- 2005 – Greg Gross

=== Philadelphia Sports Writers Association (PSWA) awards ===
==== PSWA Pro Athlete of the Year ====
- Jimmy Rollins (2007; award was then called "Outstanding Pro Athlete")
- Brad Lidge (2008; award was then called "Outstanding Pro Athlete")
- Roy Halladay (2010)

==== PSWA Executive of the Year ====
- Rubén Amaro, Jr. (2009)

==== PSWA Living Legend Award ====
- 2007 – Harry Kalas
- 2012 – Larry Bowa

==== PSWA Humanitarian Award ====
Note: In 2012, this award was renamed the Ed Snider Lifetime Distinguished Humanitarian Award.

- 2009 – Dickie Noles
- 2010 – Shane Victorino
- 2015 – David Montgomery (chairman)

==== PSWA Good Guy Award ====
- 1978 – Tim McCarver
- 1980 – Tug McGraw
- 1983 – Al Holland
- 1984 – Greg Gross
- 1993 – Curt Schilling
- 1995 – Mickey Morandini
- 1996 – Ricky Bottalico
- 1997 – Rico Brogna
- 2000 – Doug Glanville
- 2004 – Jim Thome
- 2006 – Chris Coste
- 2011 – Hunter Pence

==== PSWA Lifetime Achievement Award ====
- Larry Shenk (public-relations director) (2007)

==== PSWA Special Achievement Award ====
- 2011 – Charlie Manuel
- 2012 – Jimmy Rollins

=== John Wanamaker Athletic Award (Philadelphia Sports Congress) ===
Note: The award is presented during the summer, based on the awardee's performance during the preceding calendar year.
See footnotes

- 1964 – Gene Mauch
- 1973 – Steve Carlton
- 1977 – Mike Schmidt
- 1981 – 1980 Phillies
- 1983 – Steve Carlton
- 1994 – 1993 Phillies
- 1998 – Curt Schilling
- 2007 – Ryan Howard
- 2008 – Jimmy Rollins
- 2009 – 2008 Phillies
- 2011 – Roy Halladay

=== Pride of Philadelphia Award ===
- Ryan Howard (2006)
- Jimmy Rollins (2007)
- Philadelphia Phillies (2008)
- Carlos Ruiz (2010)

=== Daily News Sportsperson of the Year ===
- Brad Lidge (2008)
- Roy Halladay (2010, 2011)

=== Philadelphia Jewish Sports Hall of Fame ===
- Rubén Amaro, Jr. (2009)

=== Philadelphia Sports Hall of Fame ===
- 2004 – Richie Ashburn, Steve Carlton, Harry Kalas ("Legacy of Excellence"; broadcaster), Robin Roberts, Mike Schmidt
- 2005 – Grover Cleveland Alexander
- 2006 – Del Ennis
- 2007 – 1980 Phillies, Chuck Klein
- 2008 – Ed Delahanty
- 2009 – Larry Bowa
- 2010 – Tug McGraw, Dick Allen
- 2011 – Curt Simmons
- 2012 – Johnny Callison
- 2013 – Greg Luzinski
- 2014 – Chief Bender, Curt Schilling
- 2015 – Sam Thompson, Garry Maddox
- 2016 – Chris Short, Charlie Manuel

=== Great Friend to Kids (GFTK) Award ===
Note: Awarded by Please Touch Museum (the Children's Museum of Philadelphia)

- Phillie Phanatic (2009)

== Minor-league system ==
See footnotes
For one-year status as the top organization in MiLB—based on the combined win–loss percentage of its domestic affiliates in MiLB—see footnote.

=== Team championships ===
- Triple-A: San Diego Padres (1967; Pacific Coast League), Portland Beavers (1983; Pacific Coast League)
- Double-A: Reading Phillies (1968, 1973, 1995, 2001 (tied; series cancelled); Eastern League)
- High-A: Clearwater Phillies (1993; Florida State League), Clearwater Threshers (2007; Florida State League)
- Single-A: Rocky Mount Phillies (1975; Carolina League)
- Low-A: Bend Phillies (1979; Northwest League), Spartanburg Phillies (1988; South Atlantic League), Lakewood BlueClaws (2006, 2009, 2010; South Atlantic League)

=== MiLBY Awards ===
==== Top Offensive Player ====
- Dylan Cozens (2016)

=== Joe Bauman Home Run Award ===
- Ryan Howard (2004)
- Darin Ruf (2012)
- Dylan Cozens (2016)

=== Baseball America Minor League All-Star Team ===
First team

- 2017 – Rhys Hoskins (1B), Lehigh Valley IronPigs (AAA)

Second team

- 2017 – Scott Kingery (2B), Reading Fightin' Phils (AA)

=== Baseball America Minor League Manager of the Year ===
- 2011 – Ryne Sandberg, Lehigh Valley IronPigs

=== King of Baseball ===
"Note: This ceremonial title is awarded by Minor League Baseball to one person each year in recognition of longtime dedication and service to professional baseball.

- Pat Gillick (2008)

=== Baseball America Triple-A Classification All-Star Team ===
- 2017 – Rhys Hoskins (1B) and Tom Eshelman (SP; 1 of 5), Lehigh Valley IronPigs

=== International League Most Valuable Player ===
- 2017 – Rhys Hoskins, Lehigh Valley IronPigs

=== International League Most Valuable Pitcher ===
- 2012 – Tyler Cloyd, Lehigh Valley IronPigs
- 2016 – Jake Thompson, Lehigh Valley IronPigs

=== International League Rookie of the Year ===
- 2017 – Rhys Hoskins, Lehigh Valley IronPigs

=== International League Postseason All-Star Team ===
- Andy Tracy, Lehigh Valley IronPigs (2009)
- Rhys Hoskins, Lehigh Valley IronPigs (2017; 1B)

=== Pacific Coast League Most Valuable Player ===
- 1967 – Rick Joseph, San Diego Padres (PCL)
- 1969 – Denny Doyle, Eugene Emeralds

=== Baseball America Double-A Classification All-Star Team ===
- 2017 – Scott Kingery (2B), Reading Fightin’ Phils

=== Eastern League Most Valuable Player ===
- 1970 – Greg Luzinski, Reading Phillies
- 1980 – Mark Davis, Reading Phillies
- 1983 – Jeff Stone, Reading Phillies
- 2001 – Marlon Byrd, Reading Phillies
- 2004 – Ryan Howard, Reading Phillies
- 2012 – Darin Ruf, Reading Phillies
- 2015 – Brock Stassi, Reading Fightin' Phils

=== Eastern League Pitcher of the Year ===
- 2002 – Ryan Madson, Reading Phillies

=== Eastern League Rookie of the Year ===
- 1999 – Pat Burrell, Reading Phillies
- 2001 – Marlon Byrd, Reading Phillies
- 2004 – Ryan Howard, Reading Phillies
- 2005 – Chris Roberson, Reading Phillies
- 2009 – Michael Taylor, Reading Phillies
- 2012 – Darin Ruf, Reading Phillies
- 2016 – Rhys Hoskins, Reading Fightin Phils

=== Eastern League Manager of the Year ===
- Bob Wellman, Reading Phillies (1975)
- Bill Dancy, Reading Phillies (1983, 1995)
- Al LeBeouf, Reading Phillies (1997)
- Gary Varsho, Reading Phillies (2000)
- Dusty Wathan, Reading Fightin' Phils (2015)

=== Stenson Award (Arizona Fall League) ===
- 2008 – Jason Donald, Mesa Solar Sox

=== Baseball America Low Class A Classification All-Star Team ===
- 2017 – Darick Hall (1B) and Nick Fanti (SP; 1 of 5), Lakewood BlueClaws

=== Baseball America Rookie-Level Classification All-Star Team ===
- 2017 – Jhordany Mezquita (SP; 1 of 5), Gulf Coast League Phillies

=== Baseball America Dominican Summer League Classification All-Star Team ===
- 2017 – Leonel Aponte (SP; 1 of 5), DSL Phillies

=== Baseball America Short-Season Classification All-Star Team ===
- 2017 – Jhailyn Ortiz (OF; 1 of 3), Williamsport Crosscutters

=== Paul Owens Award (pitcher and position player) ===
For a description of the award and a list of awardees from 1986 to 2007, see footnote.
For a list of awardees from 1986 to 2011, see footnote.

- 1986 – Marvin Freeman (RHP)
- 1986 – Ron Jones (OF)
- 1987 – Todd Frohwirth (RHP)
- 1987 – Ricky Jordan (1B)
- 1988 – Andy Carter (LHP)
- 1988 – Jim Vatcher (OF)
- 1989 – Jason Grimsley (RHP)
- 1989 – Mickey Morandini (SS)
- 1990 – Andy Ashby (RHP)
- 1990 – Jeff Grotewold (C)
- 1991 – Toby Borland (RHP)
- 1991 – Kim Batiste (SS)
- 1992 – Paul Fletcher (RHP)
- 1992 – Mike Lieberthal (C)
- 1993 – Ricky Bottalico (RHP)
- 1993 – Phil Geisler (OF)
- 1994 – Ron Blazier (RHP)
- 1994 – Gene Schall (1B)
- 1995 – Rich Hunter (RHP)
- 1995 – David Doster (2B) and Wendell Magee (OF)
- 1996 – Matt Beech (LHP)
- 1996 – Scott Rolen (3B)
- 1997 – Ryan Brannan (RHP)
- 1997 – Jeff Key (OF) and Jimmy Rollins (SS)
- 1998 – Carlton Loewer (RHP)
- 1998 – Marlon Anderson (2B)
- 1999 – Adam Eaton (RHP)
- 1999 – Pat Burrell (1B)
- 2000 – Brandon Duckworth (RHP)
- 2000 – Marlon Byrd (OF)
- 2001 – Brandon Duckworth (RHP)
- 2001 – Marlon Byrd (OF)
- 2002 – Ryan Madson (RHP)
- 2002 – Chase Utley (3B)
- 2003 – Cole Hamels (LHP)
- 2003 – Ryan Howard (1B)
- 2004 – Scott Mitchinson (RHP)
- 2004 – Ryan Howard (1B)
- 2005 – Robinson Tejeda (RHP)
- 2005 – Chris Roberson (OF)
- 2006 – Carlos Carrasco (RHP)
- 2006 – Michael Bourn (OF)
- 2007 – Mike Zagurski (LHP)
- 2007 – Quintin Berry (OF)
- 2008 – J. A. Happ (LHP)
- 2008 – Lou Marson (C)
- 2009 – Kyle Drabek (RHP)
- 2009 – Michael Taylor (OF)
- 2010 – Scott Mathieson (RHP)
- 2010 – Domonic Brown (OF)
- 2011 – Trevor May (RHP)
- 2011 – Freddy Galvis (SS)
- 2012 – Tyler Cloyd (RHP)
- 2012 – Darin Ruf (OF)
- 2013 – Severino Gonzalez (RHP)
- 2013 – Maikel Franco (3B)
- 2014 – Luis García (RHP)
- 2014 – J. P. Crawford (SS)
- 2015 – Ricardo Pinto (RHP)
- 2015 – Andrew Knapp (C)
- 2016 – Ben Lively (RHP)
- 2016 – Dylan Cozens (OF) and Rhys Hoskins (1B)
- 2017 – Tom Eshelman (RHP)
- 2017 – Scott Kingery (2B)
- 2018 - David Parkinson (LHP)
- 2018- Austin Listi (1B)
- 2019 – Ethan Lindow (RHP)
- 2019 – Alec Bohm (3B)
- 2021 - Jean Cabrera (RHP)
- 2021 - Bryson Stott (SS)
- 2022 - Andrew Painter (RHP)
- 2022 - Darick Hall (1B)
- 2023 - Orion Kerkering (RHP)
- 2023 - Johan Rojas (OF)
- 2024 - Eiberson Castellano (RHP)
- 2024 - Justin Crawford (OF)
- 2025 - Griff McGarry (RHP)
- 2025 - Otto Kemp (UTL)

== See also ==
- Baseball awards
- List of Major League Baseball awards
