= Richie Ashburn =

American baseball player and broadcaster (1927–1997)

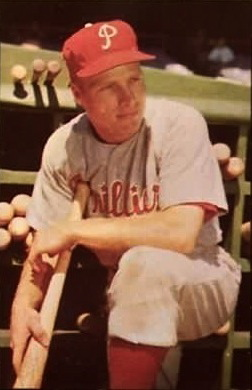
- Ashburn with the Philadelphia Phillies, c. 1953
- Center fielder
- Born: March 19, 1927; Tilden, Nebraska, U.S.
- Died: September 9, 1997 (aged 70); New York City, New York, U.S.
- Batted: Left Threw: Right

MLB debut
- April 20, 1948, for the Philadelphia Phillies

Last MLB appearance
- September 30, 1962, for the New York Mets

MLB statistics
- Batting average: .308
- Hits: 2,574
- Home runs: 29
- Runs batted in: 586
- Stats at Baseball Reference

Teams
- Philadelphia Phillies (1948–1959); Chicago Cubs (1960–1961); New York Mets (1962)

Career highlights and awards
- 6× All-Star (1948, 1951, 1953, 1958, 1962, 1962²); 2× NL batting champion (1955, 1958); NL stolen base leader (1948); Philadelphia Phillies No. 1 retired; Philadelphia Phillies Wall of Fame

Member of the National

Baseball Hall of Fame
- Induction: 1995
- Election method: Veterans Committee

Don Richard Ashburn (March 19, 1927 – September 9, 1997), also known by the nicknames "Putt-Putt", "the Tilden Flash", and "Whitey" (due to his light-blond hair), was an American professional baseball player and television sports commentator. He played in Major League Baseball as a center fielder from 1948 to 1962, most prominently as a member of the Philadelphia Phillies, where he was a four-time All-Star player and member of the 1950 National League pennant winning team known as the Whiz Kids.

Ashburn was a two-time National League (NL) batting champion, and finished with a .308 career batting average. He also excelled as a defensive player, routinely leading the league in putouts. His 5,803 career putouts ranks third among center fielders in Major League Baseball history behind only Willie Mays and Tris Speaker. He ended his playing career with the Chicago Cubs and the New York Mets.

Following his playing career, from 1963 until his death in 1997, Ashburn was a color commentator for television broadcasts of Philadelphia Phillies games, and developed into one of the most beloved sports figures in Philadelphia sports history. In 1995, following a lengthy fan-led effort for his inclusion, Ashburn was inducted into the National Baseball Hall of Fame. In 1997, he was inducted into The Broadcast Pioneers of Philadelphia Hall of Fame. He was posthumously inducted into the inaugural class of the Philadelphia Sports Hall of Fame in 2004.

== Career ==
=== Early baseball career ===
Ashburn was born in Tilden, Nebraska. His mother gave birth twice, each time to twins; Richie and sister Donna were the younger pair. He began playing baseball in 1935 in the Tilden Midget Baseball League when he was eight years old. He played as a catcher because his father advised him that it would be the fastest route to becoming a major league player.

Ashburn played baseball and basketball for Tilden High School then graduated to American Legion Baseball with the Neligh Junior Legion team while continuing to play as a catcher. At the 1944 American Legion Junior Baseball East/West All-Star game at the Polo Grounds, Philadelphia Athletics manager Connie Mack advised him to play another position due to his remarkable running speed.

Ashburn signed a contract with the Cleveland Indians in 1943 at the age of 16, but Baseball Commissioner Kenesaw Mountain Landis voided the contract because the rules then prohibited the signing of players who were still attending high school. He then signed a contract with the Chicago Cubs to play for their Nashville farm team in 1944, but Landis nullified the Cubs contract because of an illegal clause that would have paid Ashburn if the Nashville franchise was sold while he was playing there. After the two contracts were nullified, Ashburn decided to enroll at Norfolk Junior College. After one semester, however, he signed a contract with the Philadelphia Phillies. Unlike the first two attempts, this one stuck.

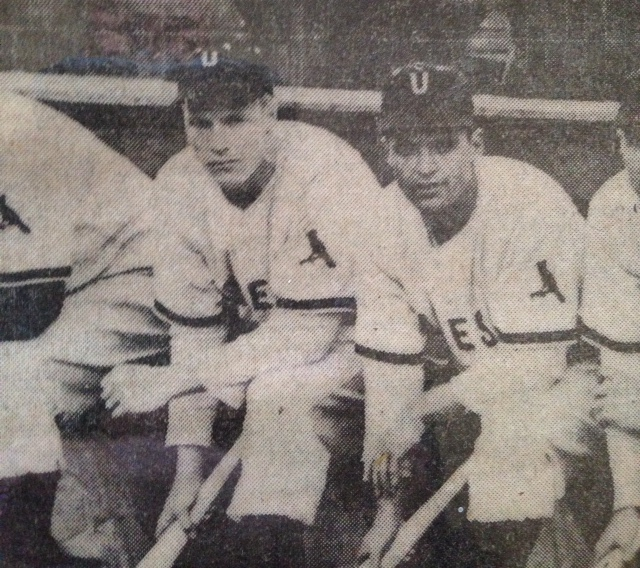
Ashburn and Nick Picciuto as members of the Utica Blue Sox in 1945

In 1945, at the age of eighteen, Ashburn made his professional baseball debut with the Utica Blue Sox of the Eastern League. It was there that his manager, Eddie Sawyer, converted him into a center fielder, taking advantage of his impressive running speed. During his time with the Utica Blue Sox, Ashburn's teammates began calling him "Whitey" because of his light blond hair, a nickname which stayed with him for the rest of his life.

Ashburn was drafted by the United States Army early in the 1945 season. He was allowed to finish the season, however, in which the Blue Sox won the Eastern League pennant. Ashburn led the team with a .312 batting average. He served with the Army in Alaska in 1946, then returned to the Blue Sox in 1947, where his team once again won the Eastern League championship. Ashburn finished with the second best batting average in the Eastern League at .362. His 191 hits (in 137 games) set a league record for the most hits in a season. After the 1947 season, he returned to Norfolk Junior College for a second semester, where he met his future wife, Herberta Cox.

=== Major League Baseball ===
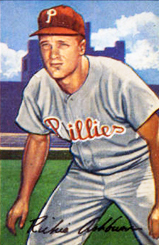
Ashburn's 1952 Bowman Gum baseball card

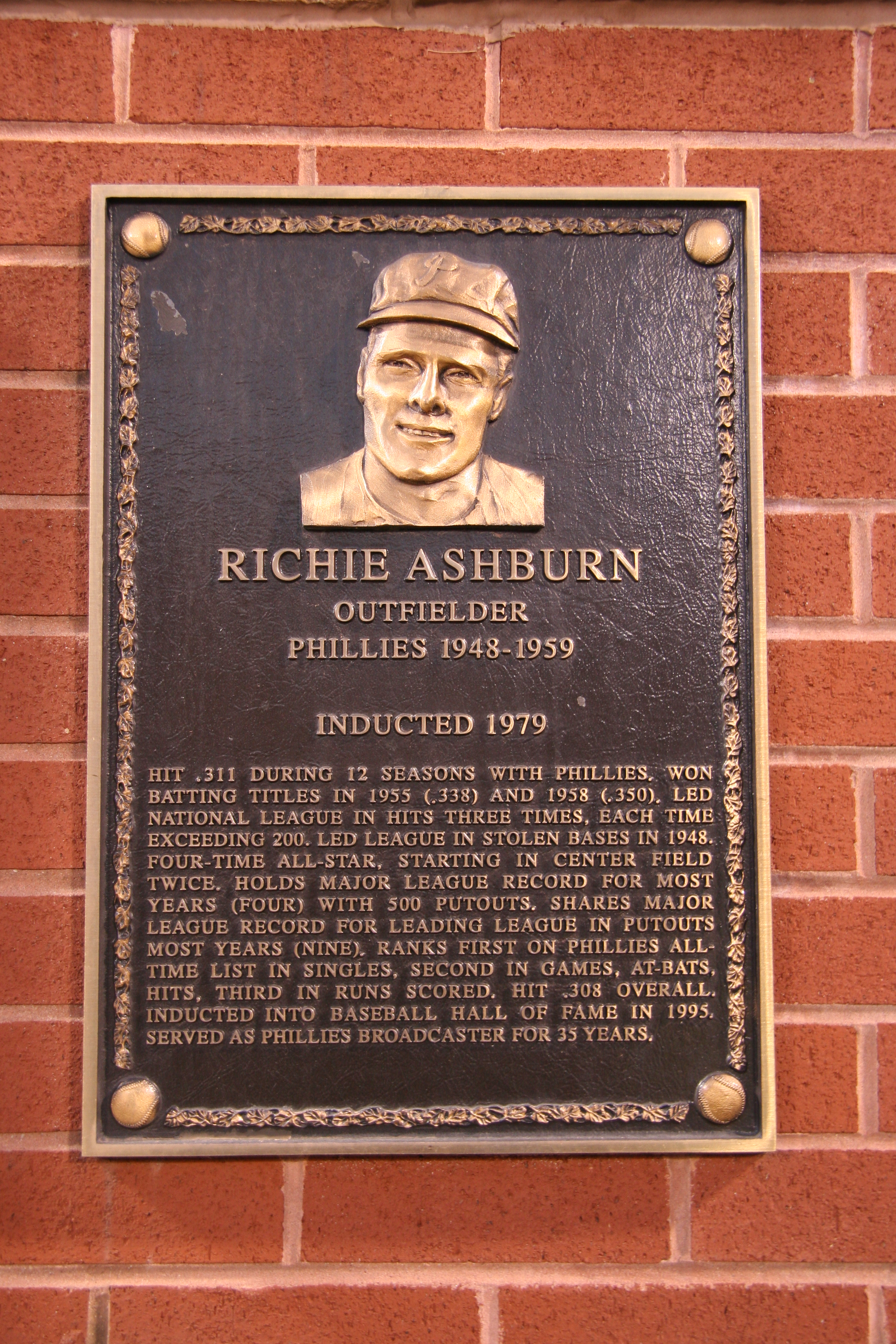
Ashburn's plaque on the Philadelphia Baseball Wall of Fame at Citizens Bank Park

The Phillies purchased Ashburn's contract from their Toronto minor league affiliate on April 8, 1948, Ashburn made his major league debut with the Phillies on Opening Day 1948 as a 21-year-old rookie. He started as the left fielder and replaced veteran Harry Walker, the reigning NL batting champion, as the team's leadoff hitter. He played as a left fielder for the first 12 games of the season before replacing Walker as the regular center fielder.

By June 5, Ashburn had produced a .380 batting average and had a 23-game hitting streak while his level of defensive play had impressed Shibe Park spectators. When Ashburn was named the starting center fielder for the National League team in the 1948 Major League Baseball All-Star Game, he became only the third rookie player in MLB history to start in an All-Star Game after Joe DiMaggio (1936) and Dick Wakefield (1943). Ashburn was the only rookie chosen to the 1948 National League All-Star team where, he hit a single on the first pitch of the game and scored the first run of the game.

In 1950, in the last game of the regular season, Ashburn threw out Cal Abrams of the Brooklyn Dodgers at home plate to preserve a 1–1 tie and set the stage for Dick Sisler's pennant-clinching home run that sent the Phillies to the 1950 World Series. In the play, Ashburn was positioned in to back up a pick-off throw on a pitchout, but Phillies' pitcher Robin Roberts instead threw a fastball to the Dodgers' Duke Snider.

The following year Ashburn displayed his fielding skill on the national stage in the All-Star Game at Tiger Stadium in Detroit. The Associated Press reported, "Richie Ashburn, fleet footed Philadelphia Phillies outfielder, brought the huge Briggs Stadium crowd of 52,075 to its feet with a brilliant leaping catch in the sixth inning to rob Vic Wertz of a near homer. Ashburn caught the ball in front of the right centerfield screen 400 feet distant after a long run." He was also the last Phillies player to collect eight hits in a double-header when he singled eight times in a twinbill at Pittsburgh on May 20, 1951.

Ashburn was a singles hitter rather than a slugger, accumulating over 2,500 hits in 15 years against only 29 home runs. In his day he was regarded as the archetypal "spray hitter", stroking the ball equally well to all fields, thus making him harder to defend against. Ashburn accumulated the most hits (1,875) of any batter during the 1950s.

Ted Williams gave Ashburn the nickname "Putt-Putt" because he "ran so fast you would think he had twin motors in his pants". The origin of the nickname also has been attributed to Stan Musial.

During a game on August 17, 1957, Ashburn hit a foul ball into the stands that struck spectator Alice Roth, wife of Philadelphia Bulletin sports editor Earl Roth, breaking her nose. When play resumed, Ashburn fouled off another ball that struck her while she was being carried off in a stretcher. Ashburn and Roth maintained a friendship for many years, and the Roths' son later served as a Phillies batboy. 1958 marked the ninth year he had over four hundred putouts as an outfielder, a record.

Ashburn was traded to the Chicago Cubs following the 1959 season for three players. He went on to anchor center field for the North Siders in 1960 and 1961. Anticipating a future career behind a microphone, Ashburn sometimes conducted a post-game baseball instruction clinic at Wrigley Field for the benefit of the youngsters in the WGN-TV viewing audience.

Ashburn was purchased by the expansion New York Mets for the 1962 season and was the first batter in franchise history. He had a good year offensively, batting .306, and was the team's first All-Star Game representative. It was, however, a frustrating year for the polished professional, who had begun his career with a winner and found himself playing for the least successful team in modern baseball history (with a record of 40–120), a record of futility unmatched for another 62 years that followed, until it was finally surpassed by the 2024 Chicago White Sox.

Ashburn retired after the 1962 season.

In his last five seasons, Ashburn played for the 8th-place Phillies, the 7th-place Cubs and, in his final year, the 1962 10th-place Mets. That infamous first-year Mets club won only a quarter of its games; after the season Ashburn decided to retire from active play. The last straw might have been during the Mets' 120th loss, when Ashburn, in the final game of his career, was involved in a triple play in the 8th inning pulled off by his former teammates, the 9th-place Cubs. According to Jimmy Breslin, it was the prospect of sitting on the bench that led Ashburn to retire: "He sat on the bench for a while with another team once and it bothered him badly. And he said that if he ever had to be a benchwarmer for the New York Mets he'd commit suicide."

Throughout his playing career, Ashburn, who lived in his hometown of Tilden during the offseason, officiated high school basketball games throughout Nebraska as a way to stay in playing condition. He became a well-respected official, but retired from officiating when he retired from baseball.

== Broadcasting career ==
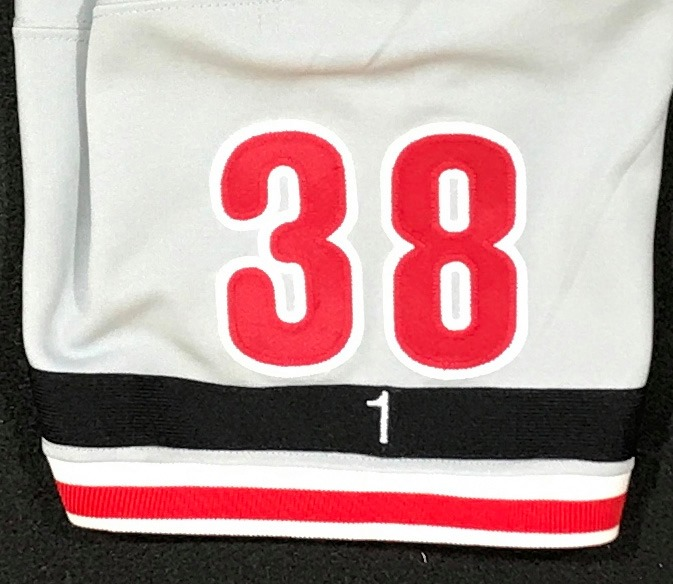
A September 1997 Phillies jersey at the Ashburn memorial

Starting in 1963, Ashburn became a radio and TV color commentator for the Phillies, his original big-league team. He first worked with long-time Phillies announcers Bill Campbell and Byrum Saam. In 1971 Campbell was released by the Phillies and replaced by Harry Kalas. From 1971 to 1976, Ashburn worked together with Saam and Kalas who would both be Ford C. Frick Award winners. Saam retired in 1976, and Ashburn continued working with Kalas for the next two decades, the two growing to be best friends. Kalas often referred to Ashburn as "His Whiteness", a nickname Kalas used for most of Ashburn's life for the man he openly adored.

He was well known for his dry humor as a broadcaster. On one occasion, he was talking to Harry Kalas about his superstitions during his playing days. He said that he once had a habit of keeping a successful baseball bat in bed with him between games, not trusting the clubhouse crew to give him the same bat the next day. Ashburn told Kalas that he had "slept with a lot of old bats" in his day.

When calling late innings, Ashburn would occasionally ask on-air if the staff of Celebre's Pizza, a nearby pizzeria in South Philadelphia, was listening to the radio. Pizza would then arrive at the radio booth 15–20 minutes later. The Phillies requested that Ashburn discontinue the practice, since Celebre's was not a Phillies sponsor and it was considered free advertising. However, Ashburn was allowed to make on-air birthday and anniversary wishes during Phillies games. To circumvent the Phillies' request, he started to say, "I'd like to send out a special birthday wish to the Celebre's twins – Plain & Pepperoni!" Harry Kalas was heard on radio in 2007 making a similar wish.

Ashburn regularly wrote columns on the Phillies and Major League Baseball for the Philadelphia Bulletin and the Philadelphia Daily News.

Following the 1972 season, Ashburn interviewed for the Phillies' vacant managerial position that was ultimately filled by Danny Ozark.

== Death ==
According to Ashburn's mother, he planned to retire from broadcasting at the end of the 1997 season. On September 9, 1997, hours after broadcasting a Phillies-Mets game at Shea Stadium, Ashburn died from an apparent heart attack at his hotel room at the Grand Hyatt Hotel in Manhattan, aged 70. A large crowd of fans paid tribute to him, passing by his casket in Memorial Hall, located in Philadelphia's Fairmount Park. He is interred in the suburban Gladwyne Methodist Church Cemetery in Gladwyne, Pennsylvania in suburban Philadelphia.

== Legacy ==
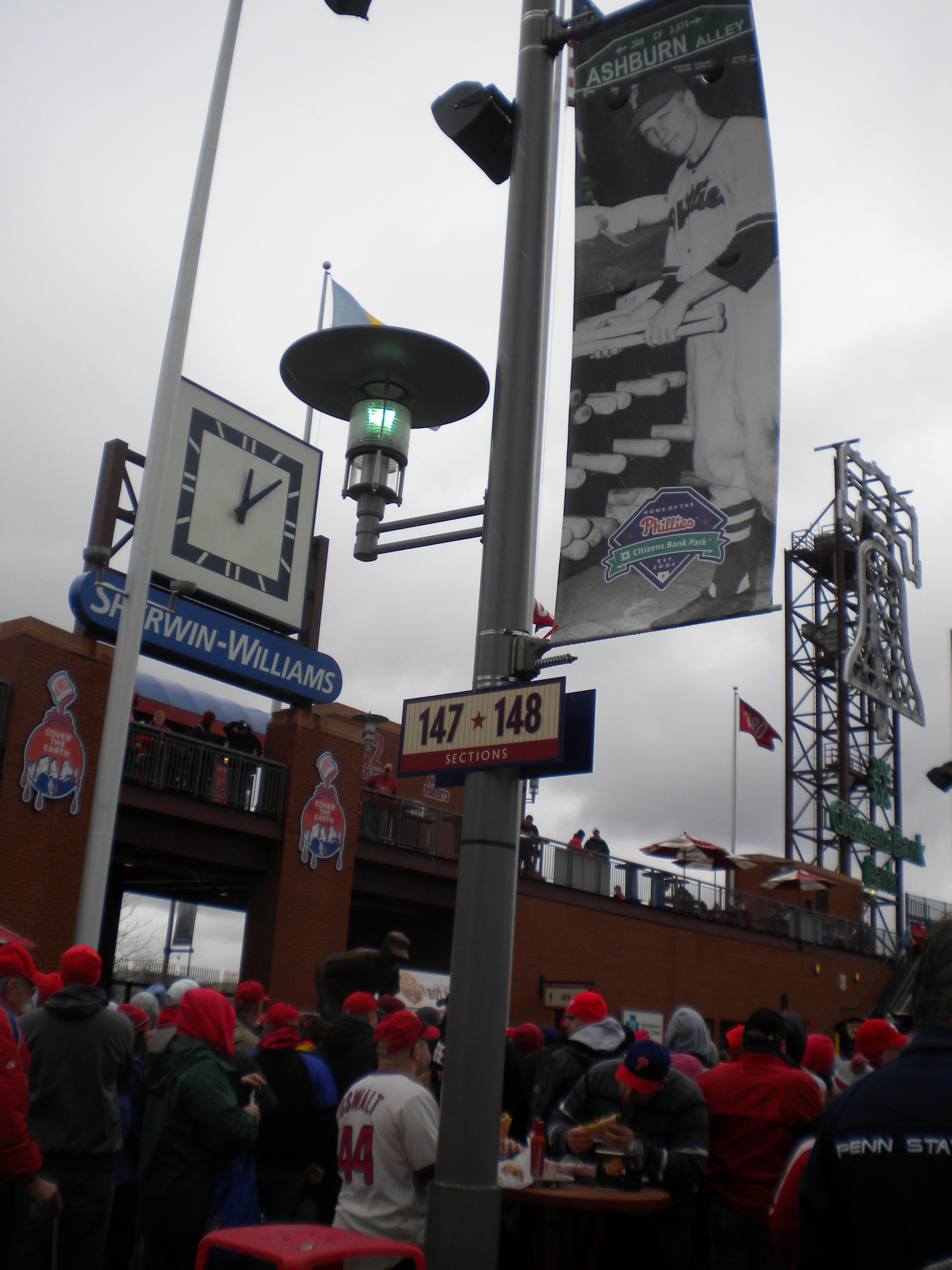
A Richie Ashburn banner in Ashburn Alley at Citizens Bank Park

The Phillies retired Richie Ashburn's number in 1979

The book, Richie Ashburn: Why The Hall Not?, is about Richie's journey to the Baseball Hall of Fame; Ashburn was elected to the Baseball Hall of Fame by the Hall's Veterans Committee in 1995 after a long fan campaign to induct him, which included bumper stickers that read, "Richie Ashburn: Why The Hall Not?" He accompanied Phillies great Mike Schmidt, who was inducted in the same ceremony. Over 25,000 fans, mostly from the Philadelphia area, traveled to Cooperstown, New York for the ceremony.

Ashburn was inducted into The Broadcast Pioneers of Philadelphia Hall of Fame in 1997. He was posthumously inducted into the inaugural class of the Philadelphia Sports Hall of Fame in 2004.

Each year, the Phillies present the Richie Ashburn Special Achievement Award to "a member of the organization who has demonstrated loyalty, dedication and passion for the game."

The center field entertainment area at Citizens Bank Park, the Phillies' home stadium, is named Ashburn Alley in his honor after numerous fans urged the Phillies to name their new stadium after Ashburn. Ashburn's 47 seasons of service to the Phillies organization was second in length in Philadelphia baseball history only to Connie Mack, who was honored by the renaming of Shibe Park as Connie Mack Stadium in 1953.

At Citizens Bank Park, the Phillies' radio broadcast booth is named the Richie 'Whitey' Ashburn Broadcast Booth in Ashburn's honor. It is directly next to the television broadcast booth, which was renamed "The Harry Kalas Broadcast Booth" after Kalas's death in 2009.

Rubén Amaro Jr., former general manager of the Phillies and son of former Phillies shortstop and coach Rubén Amaro Sr., co-founded the Richie Ashburn Foundation, which provides admission to baseball camp for free to 1,100 underprivileged children in the Philadelphia metropolitan area and awards grants to area schools and colleges.

== See also ==
- List of Major League Baseball career hits leaders
- List of Major League Baseball career triples leaders
- List of Major League Baseball career runs scored leaders
- List of Major League Baseball career singles leaders
- List of Major League Baseball career stolen bases leaders
- List of Major League Baseball batting champions
- List of Major League Baseball annual stolen base leaders
- List of Major League Baseball annual triples leaders
- List of Philadelphia Phillies team records
- List of Major League Baseball consecutive games played leaders
