= Ashburn Alley =

Concourse in a baseball stadium in Philadelphia, US

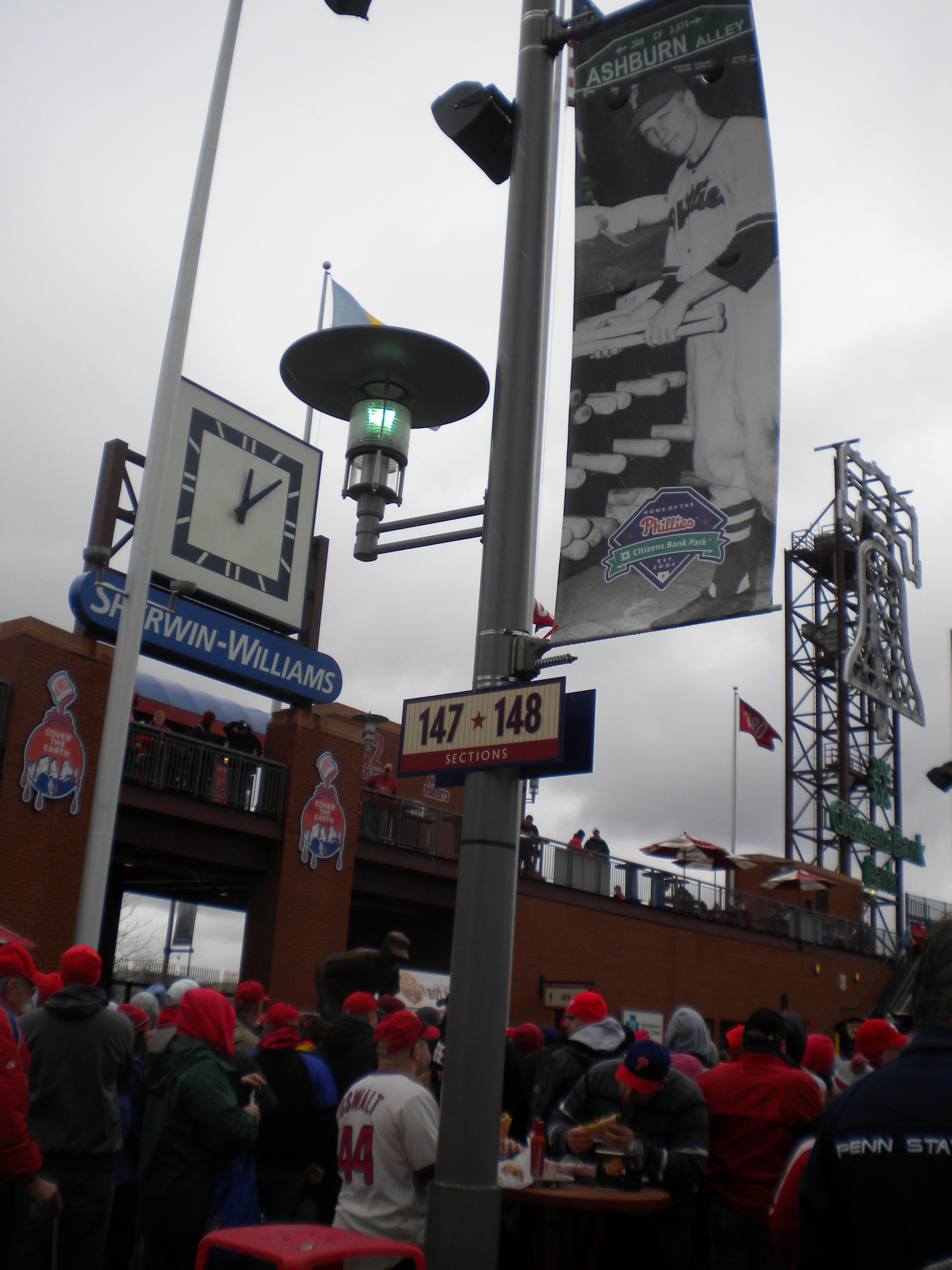
Ashburn Alley, Citizens Bank Park, Philadelphia, named after Baseball Hall of Famer Richie Ashburn

Ashburn Alley is the open concourse behind center field at Citizens Bank Park, home of the Philadelphia Phillies. It is named after Hall of Famer Richie Ashburn, Phillies center fielder from 1948 to 1959, and was also a long time broadcaster for the Phillies from 1963 until his death in September 1997. Ashburn Alley spans from the left field gate to "The Yard" kids area, and features a "street-fair" like atmosphere before and during a game.

Ashburn Alley's name sake began while Ashburn was still playing. During the Phillies playing days at old Shibe Park, Ashburn was known for dropping bunts down the third baseline, which had slightly overgrown grass that helped the ball stay fair. A bronze statue of Ashburn lies in the center of the alley.

== Features ==
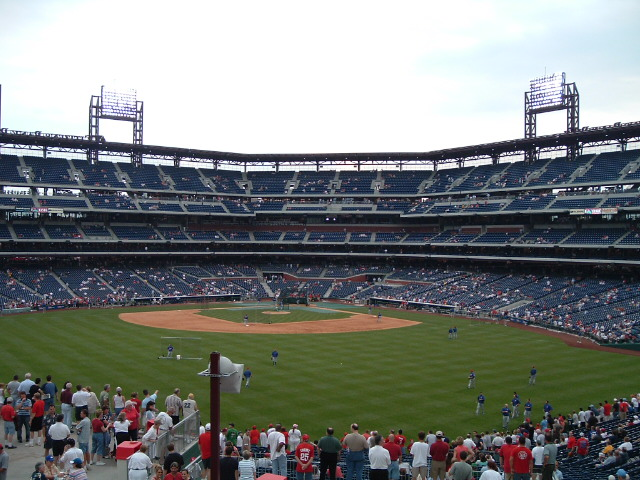
View of field from Ashburn Alley

Ashburn Alley serves as a history lesson of baseball in Philadelphia. Granite markers on the walk-way feature every Phillies all-star since the first game in 1933. Another feature of Ashburn Alley is Memory Lane. Memory Lane is located directly behind the batter's eye, and gives an extensive look at the history of Philadelphia baseball. It features the history of the Phillies, the history of Philadelphia Athletics, and history of Negro league teams in the city. At the end of the Memory Lane section offers a great view of the stadiums' two tiered bullpen. The upper bullpen, in particular, pulls snug against the concourse.

On the western end of the Alley is Bull's BBQ, named after former Phillies slugger Greg "The Bull" Luzinski, who also operates it. Bull's BBQ is an outdoor picnic section and serves barbecue pork sandwiches, chicken, and most notably ribs. Luzinski is at most of the games and often socializes with fans.

On top of the concession buildings in the center of the Alley is the Rooftop Bleachers. This area of the stadium was influenced by the old rooftop seats at the Phillies and Athletics old home Shibe Park. It was common during the 1920s for residents who lived in the rowhouses across from the ballpark to watch the games for free on their rooftops.

There are many concession stands featuring Philadelphia cuisine staples such as the cheesesteak, at both Tony Luke's and Campo's. Another Philadelphia cuisine staple is Chickie's & Pete's crabfries. The Alley also features the '47 Brand store, which sells classic Phillies apparel, classic pennants and banners, and other items. Features of the Alley are:

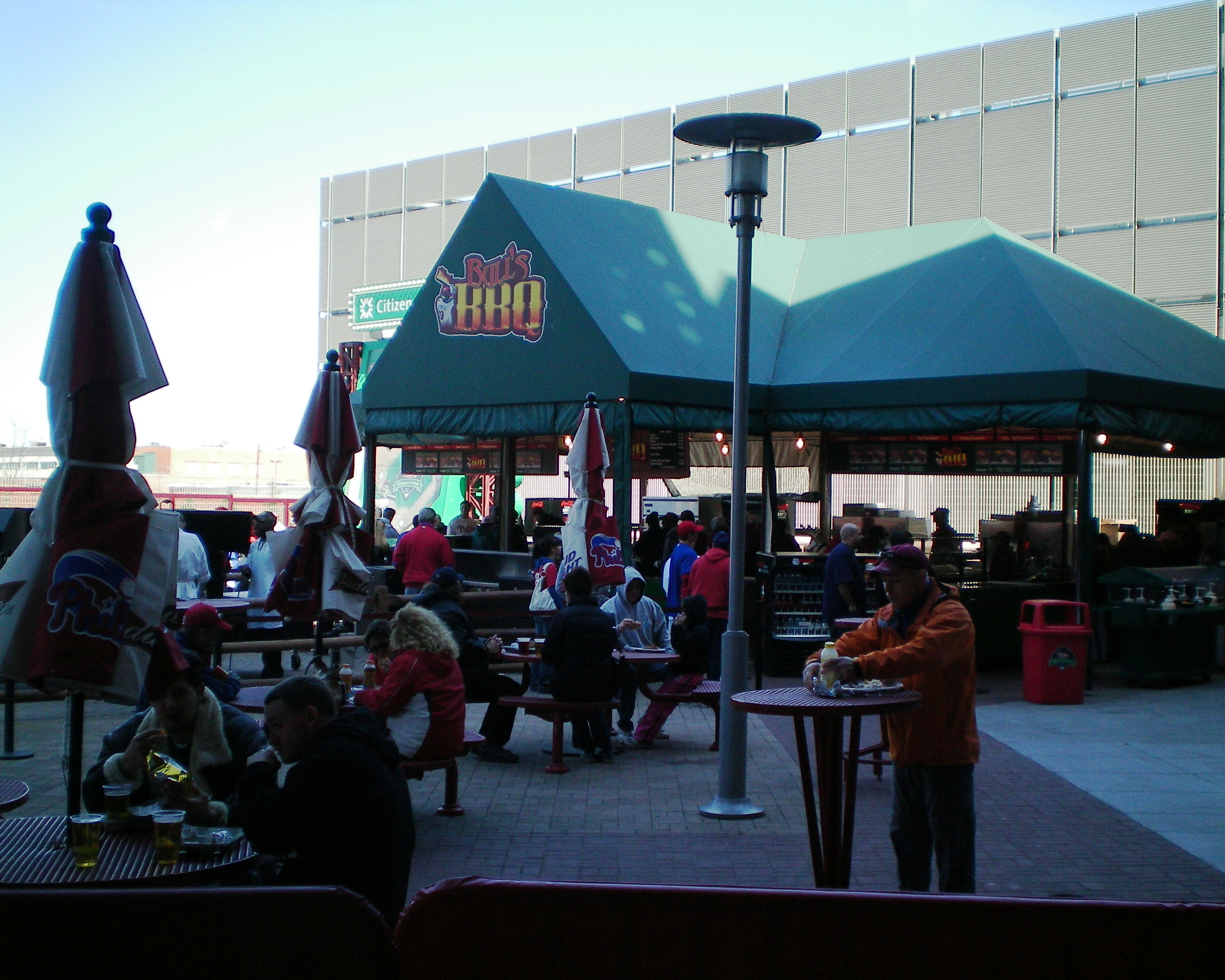
Bull's BBQ in Ashburn Alley

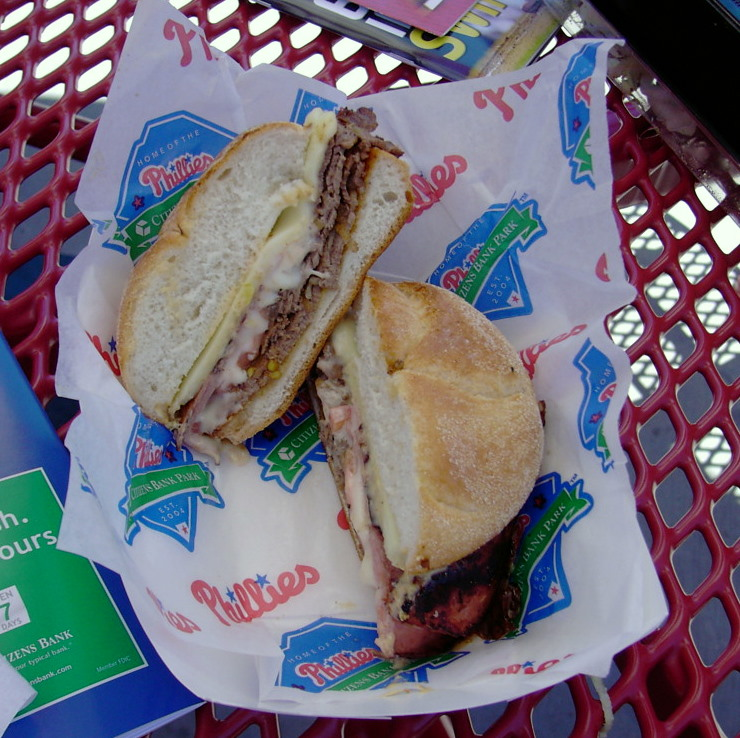
The Schmitter

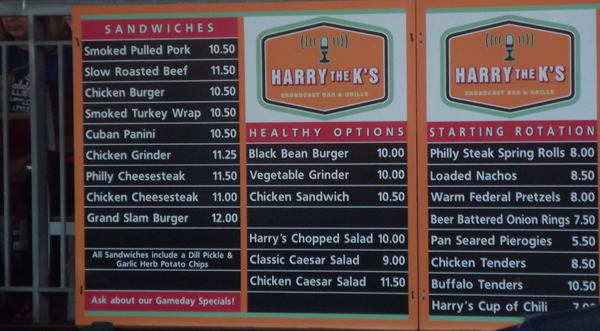
The menu board at Harry the K's Restaurant, named for former Phillies broadcaster Harry Kalas, at Citizens Bank Park

- All-Star Walk: Granite markers note Phillies players who have played in the MLB All-Star Game.
- Budweiser Batter's Eye: Sells Anheuser-Busch products
- Bull's BBQ: Moved to left side of the scoreboard, out of the Alley (in the new "Boardwalk Eats" section), it is named in honor of and owned in part by former Phillies outfielder Greg "The Bull" Luzinski. This Southern-style barbecue sells ribs and turkey legs along with pork, beef, and chicken sandwiches and "Bulldogs" (kielbasa).
- Chickie's & Pete's: Sells Crab Fries, a seasoned crinkle fry served with a cheese dipping sauce.
- Campo's: Philadelphia cheesesteaks, replaced Rick's Steaks in 2009. The original Campo's opened in 1947.
- Exposed Bullpens: Located in right-center field, the bi-level bullpens allow the fans to get very close to the players (especially the visiting team, who sit in the top level). Fans are allowed to heckle but must keep it clean. The section above the bullpen that contains the Phillies Wall of Fame is closed to the public about 30 minutes before the first pitch and remains closed throughout the game, re-opening at the game's conclusion.
- Games of Baseball: Sponsored by Citizens Financial Group, this area has a video trivia game where players compete for prizes, a run-the-bases game with the Phillie Phanatic, and a "Ring 'Em Up" game (formerly a "Pitch 'Em and Tip 'Em" game) where you throw at targets of a catcher. Before 2010, a 22 feet (6.7 m) baseball-themed pinball game was here. Players earn coupons and exchange them for prizes at a kiosk such as hats, shirts, and other ballpark-imprinted memorabilia.
- Harry The K's Bar and Grille, Named for late Phillies broadcaster Harry Kalas, the bi-level bar and grill is built into the base of the scoreboard, and serves finger foods and sandwiches, including "The Schmitter", named for former Phillies third baseman Mike Schmidt
- Jim Beam Bourbon Bar: Sells Jim Beam cocktails and local, craft, domestic, and imported beers
- Manco & Manco: An Ocean City, New Jersey, pizza franchise that took over for Seasons Pizza in 2022.
- Memory Lane and Phillies Wall of Fame: A history of baseball in Philadelphia is located behind the brick batting eye in center field, while the opposite wall commemorates members of the franchise. It was in this area where Ryan Howard hit two of the park's longest home runs, on April 23, 2006, against the Marlins off Sergio Mitre, and against Aaron Harang of the Reds on June 27, 2007, currently the longest home run at Citizen's Bank Park at 505 feet (154 m). Second baseman Chase Utley hit a homer into this area against the Astros on April 23, 2007.
- P.J. Whelihan's: A pub and restaurant franchise specializing in wings. This location serves boneless wings, wraps, fries, and nachos
- Rooftop Bleachers: Inspired by the 1920s and 1930s stands on North 20th Street outside Shibe Park, this area is similar to the seating outside Wrigley Field in Chicago. During the 2008 season, fans could go on top for $15 on Thursday home dates and get special food offers and events.
- Starting Lineup (2004–2017): The Phillies starting lineup that day was illustrated by giant 10-foot-tall (3.0 m) by 5-foot-wide (1.5 m) baseball cards as fans entered the left field gate.
- Tony Luke's: Cheesesteaks and roast pork
