= Robin Roberts (baseball) =

American baseball player (1926–2010)

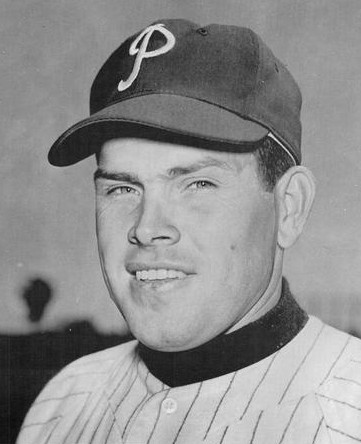
- Roberts with the Philadelphia Phillies in 1961
- Pitcher
- Born: September 30, 1926; Springfield, Illinois, U.S.
- Died: May 6, 2010 (aged 83); Temple Terrace, Florida, U.S.
- Batted: Switch Threw: Right

MLB debut
- June 18, 1948, for the Philadelphia Phillies

Last MLB appearance
- August 26, 1966, for the Chicago Cubs

MLB statistics
- Win–loss record: 286–245
- Earned run average: 3.41
- Strikeouts: 2,357
- Stats at Baseball Reference

Teams
- Philadelphia Phillies (1948–1961); Baltimore Orioles (1962–1965); Houston Astros (1965–1966); Chicago Cubs (1966)

Career highlights and awards
- 7× All Star (1950–1956); 4× NL wins leader (1952–1955); 2× NL strikeout leader (1953, 1954); Philadelphia Phillies No. 36 retired; Philadelphia Phillies Wall of Fame

Member of the National

Baseball Hall of Fame
- Induction: 1976
- Vote: 86.9% (fourth ballot)

Robin Evan Roberts (September 30, 1926 – May 6, 2010) was an American Major League Baseball starting pitcher who pitched primarily for the Philadelphia Phillies (1948–1961). He spent the latter part of his career with the Baltimore Orioles (1962–1965), Houston Astros (1965–1966), and Chicago Cubs (1966). A workhorse pitcher, Roberts won over 15 games in seven of his first eight years in the league, which saw him lead the National League in wins in four straight seasons (1952–1955) along with games and innings pitched multiple times; he topped out in wins with 28 in 1952, where he finished second in the MVP voting. In the "Whiz Kids" year of 1950, he went 20–11 with a league-leading five shutouts while pitching ten innings in the final game of the season to clinch the pennant for the Phillies, which was their first since 1915. Roberts subsequently started Game 2 of the World Series in his only postseason appearance for his career as the team was swept. A seven-time All-Star from 1950 to 1956, he departed the Phillies in 1961 with franchise records of 234 wins, 1,871 strikeouts, 529 games played and 3739 1/3 innings pitched and had his jersey retired the following year as the first Phillie to receive the honor; he still holds the franchise record for innings pitched and games played. He signed with the Orioles in 1962 and pitched the better part of four years with the team before spending the 1956 and 1966 seasons with two different teams. He retired in 1966 with 286 victories, tenth most in MLB history at the time. He was also the leader in home runs given up by a pitcher (505) until he was passed by Jamie Moyer decades later.

Roberts was inducted into the Baseball Hall of Fame in 1976.

After retiring from Major League Baseball, he coached the University of South Florida college baseball team for nine seasons, leading them to six conference titles.

== Early life and education ==
Roberts was born in Springfield, Illinois, the son of an immigrant Welsh coal miner. He arrived in East Lansing, Michigan as part of an Army Air Corps training program.

He attended Lanphier High School. After World War II, Roberts returned to Michigan State College to play basketball, not baseball. Roberts led the Spartans' basketball team in field-goal percentage in 1946–1947, was captain of the team during the 1946–1947 and 1949–1950 seasons, and earned three varsity letters in basketball. He wore number 17 for the Spartans. After his second season playing basketball, Roberts tried out for the Michigan State baseball team, becoming a pitcher because it was the position that coach John Kobs needed most.

After playing for Michigan State and spending his second summer playing in Vermont with the Barre–Montpelier Twin City Trojans, he was signed by the Philadelphia Phillies.

== Professional career ==
=== Philadelphia Phillies ===
Roberts made his Major League Baseball debut with the Philadelphia Phillies on June 18, 1948. In 1950, he led his Phillies, whose overall youth earned them the nickname the Whiz Kids, to their first National League pennant in 35 years. Roberts started three games in the last five days of the season, defeating the heavily favored Brooklyn Dodgers at Ebbets Field, in a pennant-deciding, season-ending, 10-inning game. This marked his 20th victory of the season, and Roberts became the Phillies' first 20-game winner since Grover Cleveland Alexander in 1917. Roberts also started Game 2 in the 1950 World Series against Allie Reynolds. He allowed two runs and ten hits in ten innings as the Phillies lost 2-1.

From 1950 to 1955, Roberts won at least 20 games each season, leading the National League in victories from 1952 to 1955. He led the National League in games started six times, in complete games and innings pitched five times, and he once pitched 28 complete games in a row, with one of those games lasting 17 innings. During his career, Roberts never walked more than 77 batters in any regular season. He helped himself with his bat, hitting 55 doubles, 10 triples, and five home runs with 103 RBIs.

Roberts' 28 wins in 1952, the year he was named the Sporting News MLB Player of the Year award, were the most in the National League since 1935, the year when Dizzy Dean won 28 games.

Although he had 28 wins in 1952, Roberts had his best season, based on a career high wins above replacement (WAR) in 1953, posting a 23–16 record and leading National League pitchers in strikeouts with 198. In a career-high 346 2/3 innings pitched, he walked just 66 batters, and his 2.75 ERA was second in the league behind Warren Spahn's 2.10.

One of the most memorable highlights of his career occurred on May 13, 1954, when Roberts gave up a lead-off home run to Bobby Adams of the Cincinnati Reds, then known as the Cincinnati Redlegs, but then went on to retire 27 consecutive batters to win 8–1, on a one-hit game.

Roberts consistently (11 out of 14 years) had a better winning percentage than did the Phillies in games in which he had no decision. Overall, the Phillies were 1,020–1,136 from 1948 to 1961, a winning percentage of .4731. Roberts was 234–199 in that span, for a winning percentage of .5404.

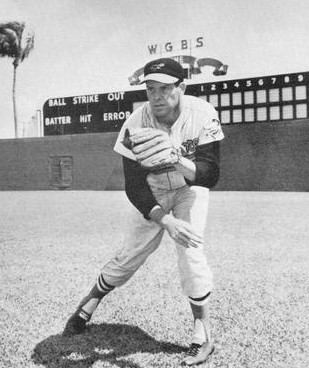
Roberts pitched for the Baltimore Orioles from 1962 to 1965.

After the 1961 season, Roberts was sold to the New York Yankees, who acquired the slumping pitcher from the Phillies for slightly more than the $20,000 league waiver price.

On February 6, 1962, the Phillies announced that Roberts' uniform number 36 would be retired by the team on March 21, 1962, when the Yankees would visit Clearwater to play the Phillies in a spring training game. It was the first uniform number to be retired by the organization. Roberts started for the Yankees in the spring game, gave up four runs in three innings, and was the winning pitcher in the Yankees' 13–10 victory. He was released by the Yankees in May 1962 without having appeared in a regular-season game for the Yankees.

=== Baltimore Orioles ===
Roberts signed with the Baltimore Orioles on May 21, 1962. He went 42–36 with a 3.09 ERA in 3 1/2 seasons with the Orioles.

In Roberts' final year in Baltimore, he was the first road roommate and mentor to Jim Palmer, who made his major league debut in relief of Roberts in the third inning of a 12–9 loss to the Boston Red Sox in Fenway Park on April 17, 1965. Palmer said 47 years later, "Robin Roberts helped teach me even though he knew I was probably going to take his job." Dissatisfied with his new role as a spot starter and long reliever, Roberts requested his release, which was granted by the Orioles on July 27, 1965.

=== Houston Astros and Chicago Cubs ===
Roberts signed with the Houston Astros on August 5. He signed with the Chicago Cubs on July 13, 1966, with the additional capacity of assisting pitching coach Freddie Fitzsimmons. Roberts was also reunited with fellow Whiz Kid Curt Simmons. His final major league game was with the Cubs on September 3, 1966, at Forbes Field. He was released by the Cubs on October 3, 1966. He pitched for the Reading Phillies during 1967.

=== Baseball Hall of Fame ===
Roberts was elected to the Baseball Hall of Fame in 1976. Ahead of the August 1976 induction, Roberts was named honorary captain of the National League for the 1976 Major League Baseball All-Star Game, which was hosted by the Phillies at Veterans Stadium.

== Coaching career ==
=== Germantown Academy ===
From 1971 to 1975, Roberts coached the Germantown Academy boys varsity baseball team in Fort Washington, Pennsylvania. The 1972 Germantown team went 22–1 and won the Inter-Ac League championship with a record of 10–0. Roberts' son was a member of that team. An annual baseball player award is named in Roberts' honor.

=== University of South Florida ===
After one season as a color commentator on Phillies broadcasts in 1976, Roberts coached the University of South Florida baseball team in Tampa, Florida from 1977 to 1985. He led the team to its first NCAA Tournament in 1982 and won six conference titles with the Bulls. He was named the Sun Belt coach of the year each season from 1978 to 1982. His uniform number 36 was the first to be retired by the team, and he was honored on the center field wall at the team's since demolished Red McEwen Field; he also is honored on the new USF Baseball Stadium.

== Other endeavors ==
During the baseball off-season, Roberts toured with the Robin Roberts All-Stars basketball team. The team played against other touring squads, such as the Harlem Globetrotters.

Roberts was also the president of the Gold King Seafood Company in Philadelphia, even during his baseball career. This was central to an appearance Roberts made on What's My Line? in 1957, where the panelists had to decipher what else he did besides play baseball.

== Legacy ==
Robin Roberts's number 36 was retired by the Philadelphia Phillies in 1962.

In his 19-season career, Roberts compiled a 286–245 record with 2,357 strikeouts, a 3.41 ERA, 305 complete games, 45 shutouts, and 4,688 2/3 innings pitched in 676 games. He is second to Jamie Moyer for the major league record for home runs allowed by a pitcher (505) and holds the record for most consecutive opening day starts for the same team with 12, from 1950 to 1961.

As a switch hitter, Roberts posted a .167 batting average (255-for-1525) with 107 runs, 55 doubles, 10 triples, 5 home runs, 103 RBI and 135 bases on balls. Defensively, he recorded a .967 fielding percentage.

Roberts is the only pitcher in major league history to defeat the Braves franchise in all three cities that the team has been based in: Boston, Milwaukee, and Atlanta.

Roberts's record for home runs allowed can largely be attributed to his durability and his tendency to pitch inside the strike zone. Roberts threw 4,688 2/3 innings during his 19-year career, 21st on the all-time innings pitched list. Roberts challenged hitters to put the ball in play, issuing relatively few walks (1.7 per 9 innings pitched) and strikeouts (4.5 per 9 innings pitched).

In 1962, the Philadelphia Phillies honored Roberts with the retirement of his uniform number, 36.

In 1966, Roberts was inducted into the Pennsylvania Sports Hall of Fame.

In 1969, in conjunction with Major League Baseball's 100th anniversary, the Phillies conducted a fan vote to determine the Phillies all-time team. On August 5, 1969, at Connie Mack Stadium, the Phillies honored the members of the all-time team, including Roberts as the only right-handed pitcher. He was also honored as the greatest Phillies player of all time.

In 1978, the Philadelphia Phillies inducted Roberts as the first Phillie in the Philadelphia Baseball Wall of Fame (along with Connie Mack as the first Athletics player in the Wall of Fame).

In 1983, the 100th anniversary of the founding of the Phillies, Roberts was selected as one of only two right-handed pitchers on the Phillies Centennial Team.

In 1985, during Roberts' last game as coach of the South Florida Bulls baseball team, the team retired his number 36.

In 1992, Roberts was one of 30 members of the charter class of former Michigan State University Spartan athletes, coaches, and administrators inducted into the MSU Athletics Hall of Fame.

In 1998, the Wilmington Blue Rocks retired Roberts's number 36 at the Carolina League All-Star game held at the Blue Rocks' Frawley Stadium. He was the first former player to ever have his number retired by the team.

In 1999, he ranked No. 74 on The Sporting News' list of the 100 Greatest Baseball Players, and was a nominee for the Major League Baseball All-Century Team. In 2020, The Athletic ranked Roberts at number 72 on its "Baseball 100" list, complied by sportswriter Joe Posnanski.

On May 18, 2003, Roberts' number 36 was among the first two uniform numbers retired by the Michigan State baseball program.

On July 21, 2003, Roberts returned to Montpelier, Vermont, to accept two honors: The Vermont Mountaineers retired his number from his playing days with the Barre-Montpelier Twin City Trojans, and Governor Jim Douglas presented him a proclamation that made the day "Robin Roberts Day" in the State of Vermont.

On April 3, 2004, the Phillies new ballpark, Citizens Bank Park, officially opened, with a statue of Roberts outside the first-base gate.

Also in 2004, Roberts was a member of the inaugural class inducted into the Philadelphia Sports Hall of Fame.

Robin Roberts Stadium in Roberts's hometown of Springfield, Illinois is named in his honor.

Roberts was an outspoken critic of Little League Baseball. His remarks on the organization appeared in a 1975 Newsweek article, titled "Strike Out Little League".

In 2013, the Bob Feller Act of Valor Award honored Roberts as one of 37 Baseball Hall of Fame members for his service in the United States Army Air Force during World War II.

Roberts coached his son, Dan Roberts, in high school. His son went on to coach the Army Black Knights, leaving that job after an alcohol-related arrest, Batavia Muckdogs, and Clearwater Threshers.

== Death ==
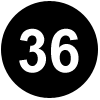
The Philadelphia Phillies wore a patch commemorating Roberts during the 2010 season.

Roberts died of natural causes on May 6, 2010, aged 83, at his home in Temple Terrace, Florida. For the remainder of their 2010 season, the Philadelphia Phillies wore a commemorative #36 patch on their uniforms and hung his jersey in their dugout during home and away games.

== Career statistics ==
- Seven-time All-Star (1950–1956)
- Five-time top 10 in MVP voting (1950, 1952–1955)
- Six-time 20+ game winner (1950–1955)
- Four-time win champion (1952–1955)
- Twice led the league in strikeouts (1953–54)
- Led league in shutouts (1950)
- Six-time league leader in games started (1950–1955)
- Five-time league leader in complete games (1952–1956)
- Five-time leaguer leader in innings pitched (1951–1955)
- Pitched 300+ innings six times (1950–1955)
- Ranks 28th on the all-time wins leaderboard
- Second-most home runs allowed by a pitcher, with 505
- Holds five Philadelphia Phillies team records as of 2010: most complete games pitched, most games pitched, most innings pitched, most hits allowed, and most losses

== Books ==
Roberts wrote two books about his baseball experiences, The Whiz Kids and the 1950 Pennant (1996, ISBN 1-56639-466-X) and My Life in Baseball (2003, ISBN 1-57243-503-8), both co-authored with C. Paul Rogers, III, a Southern Methodist University Law School professor.

== See also ==
- List of Major League Baseball annual ERA leaders
- List of Major League Baseball annual strikeout leaders
- List of Major League Baseball annual wins leaders
- List of Major League Baseball career strikeout leaders
- List of Major League Baseball career wins leaders
- List of Major League Baseball pitchers who have thrown an immaculate inning
- List of Sporting News Pitcher of the Year
- List of Sporting News Player of the Year
