= Philadelphia Phillies Wall of Fame =

Collection of plaques at Citizens Bank Park, Philadelphia, PA

- Established: 1978
- Location: 1 Citizens Bank Way; Citizens Bank Park; Philadelphia, Pennsylvania
- Coordinates: 39°54′21″N 75°9′59″W

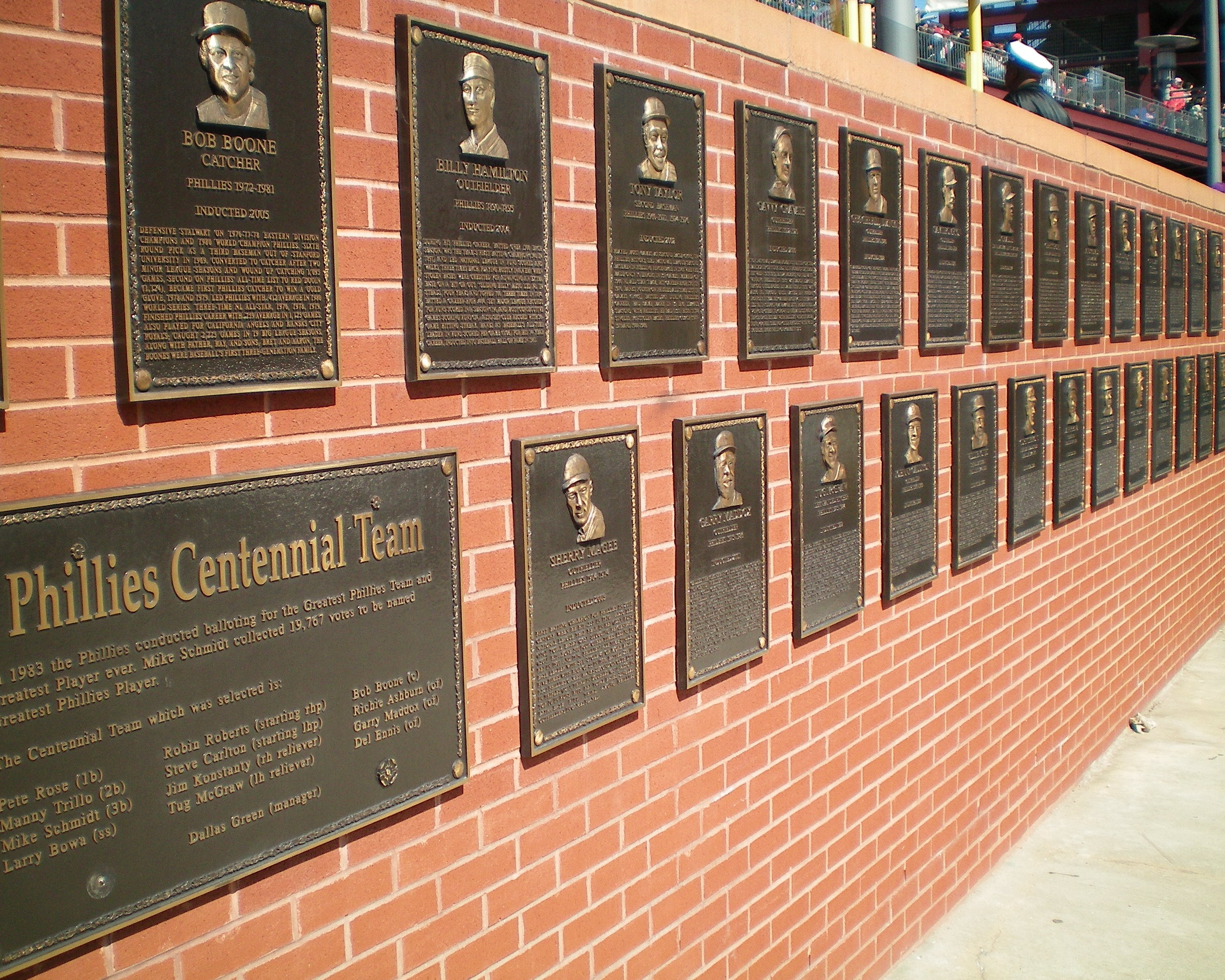
The former location of the Phillies Wall of Fame in Ashburn Alley at Citizens Bank Park

The Philadelphia Phillies Wall of Fame, formerly known as the Philadelphia Baseball Wall of Fame and officially known as the Toyota Phillies Wall of Fame for sponsorship reasons, is an exhibit located at Citizens Bank Park in Philadelphia, Pennsylvania. The exhibit is a collection of plaques that honor players and personnel who made significant contributions to baseball in Philadelphia, specifically with either the Philadelphia Phillies or the former Philadelphia Athletics. Each person inducted into the Wall of Fame is honored with a metal plaque showing the person's face, their position with and years of service to either team, along with a summary of the person's notable accolades and contributions during their career.

As of 2026, 76 individuals have been inducted into the Wall of Fame, 51 of which were affiliated with the Phillies, and 25 with the Athletics.

== History ==
The Philadelphia Baseball Wall of Fame was created in 1978 as an exhibit display located in the 200 Level of Veterans Stadium. Originally, the Phillies honored notable figures from their franchise history, along with notable members of the former Philadelphia Athletics, which played in Philadelphia from 1901 to the time of their relocation in 1954. The first induction ceremony took place on September 8, 1978, where Phillies pitcher Robin Roberts and Athletics manager Connie Mack were inducted as the first two members of the Wall of Fame.

The Phillies continued to annually induct one notable member of their franchise and one notable member of the Athletics into the Wall of Fame (with the exception of 1983, when the Phillies only inducted the 13 members of their Centennial Team). However, once Veterans Stadium closed in 2003, the plaques of Phillies members were moved to the Ashburn Alley section of the new Citizens Bank Park, while the plaques of Athletics members were relocated to the Philadelphia Athletics Historical Society building in Hatboro, Pennsylvania. When Citizens Bank Park was completed in 2004, a single plaque listing all of the Athletics inductees was attached to a statue of Connie Mack located outside the west side of the stadium. Since the move to Citizens Bank Park, the Phillies no longer induct members of the Philadelphia Athletics to the Wall of Fame, and have renamed the exhibit to the "Phillies Wall of Fame".

After the Philadelphia Athletics Historical Society closed its Hatboro location in 2013, the Athletics’ plaques were put on display at Spike's Trophies in Philadelphia, among other memorabilia of the team.

On April 10, 2017, it was announced Pete Rose would be that year's inductee into the Wall of Fame (Rose is already a member of the 1983 Centennial Team, but was planned to be honored with his own individual plaque). However, on August 12, 2017, just ten days before the ceremony, the Phillies announced Rose would not be inducted amid recent statutory rape allegations. The Phillies would ultimately not induct a new member of the Wall of Fame for 2017, and instead honored past members.

Prior to the 2018 season, Ashburn Alley was renovated, and the Phillies Wall of Fame was moved to a new location behind the left-field scoreboard, across from the left-field entrance of the stadium. Along with the plaques, the new plaza features other aspects of Phillies history, including large replicas of the team's World Series trophies from 1980 and 2008, statues of its retired numbers, and banners commemorating the team's World Series titles, league pennants, division titles, and wild card berths.

In 2022, the Phillies broke from their tradition of only inducting one member per year when they honored outfielder Bake McBride and pitcher Ron Reed, both members of the 1980 championship team. The next year, this followed with the induction of three members: owner and president Ruly Carpenter, general manager John Quinn, and third baseman Scott Rolen.

== Inductees ==
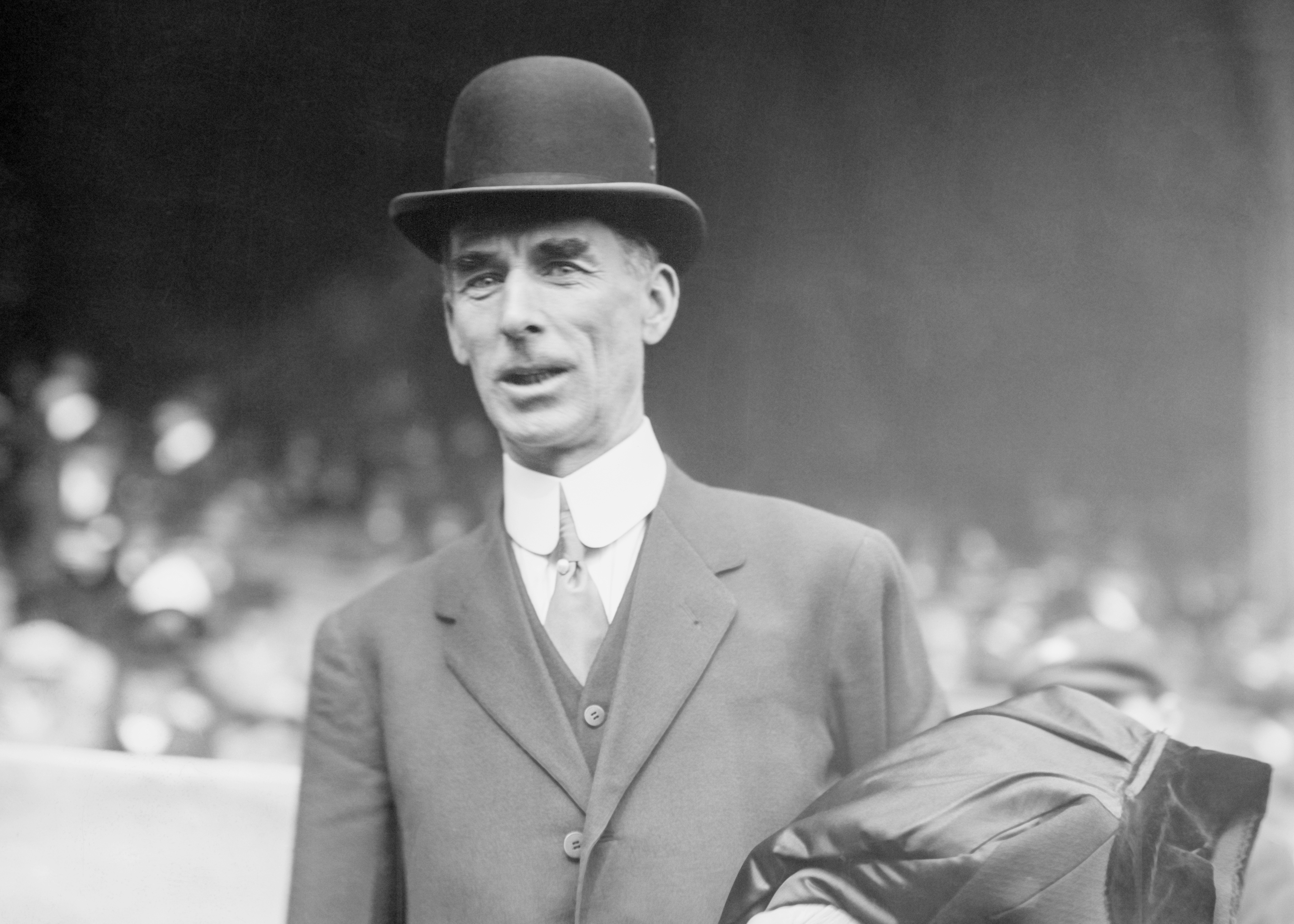
Connie Mack, inducted 1978

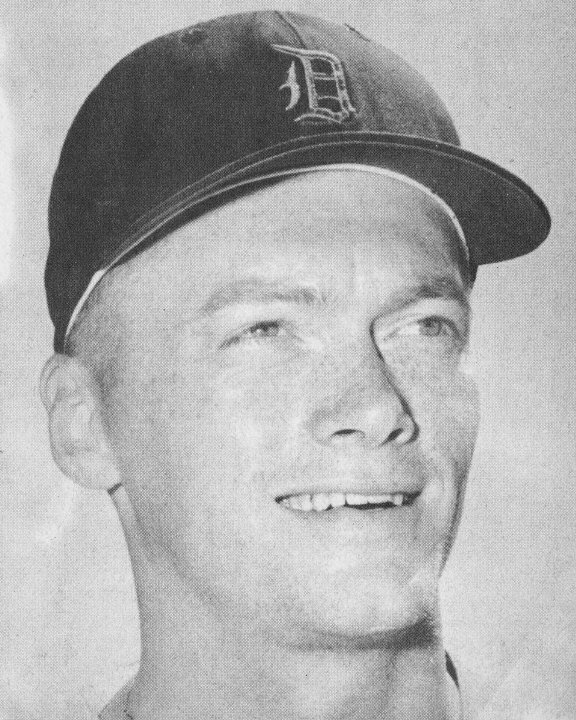
Jim Bunning, inducted 1984
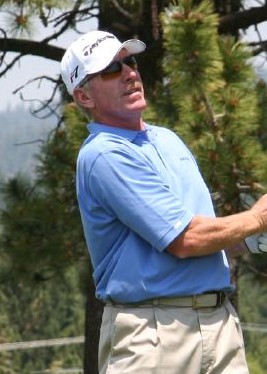
Mike Schmidt, inducted 1990
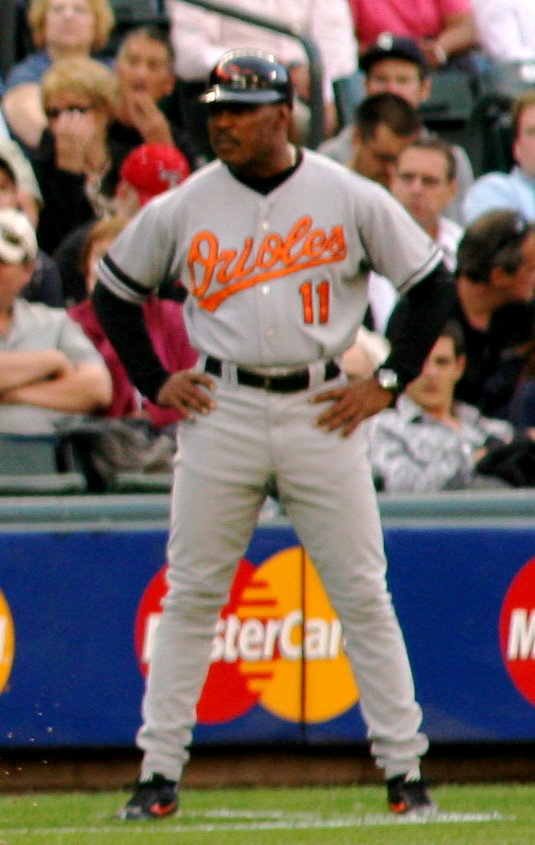
Juan Samuel, inducted 2008
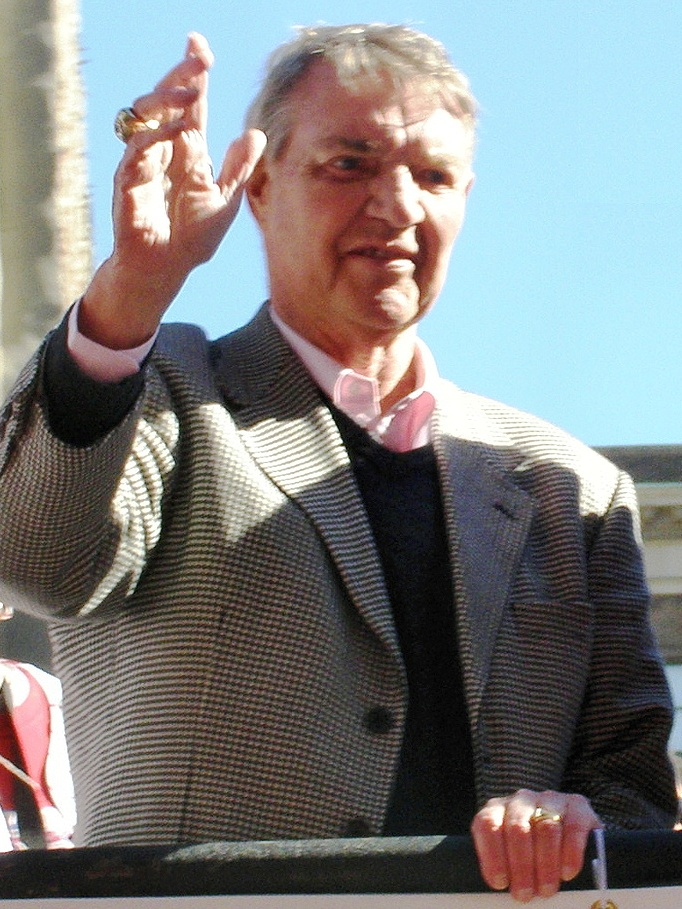
Harry Kalas, inducted 2009

Originally, the goal of the Wall of Fame was to induct the greatest players in Phillies and Athletics history, with the criteria requiring eligible players to be retired and have played at least four years with either the Phillies or the Athletics. However, exceptions have been made for non-players who have made significant contributions to the organization. Connie Mack, the Athletics' first inductee, had an 11-year playing career in the National League and the Players' League, but is most remembered for his managerial career, and was honored as such on the Wall. Members have been inducted for contributions in more than one area; Paul Owens, inducted in 1988, spent 48 years as a member of the Phillies organization, contributing as a scout, manager, general manager, and team executive. The Phillies have inducted four first basemen, five second basemen, five third basemen, four shortstops, one utility infielder, three catchers, 21 outfielders, 18 pitchers, seven managers, two general managers, one coach, two team executives, and two sportscasters. 25 members of the Wall of Fame are also members of the Baseball Hall of Fame, and all of the inductees in the first four seasons from both teams are hall of famers. Del Ennis was the first non-hall-of-famer to be inducted.

Although the present-day Athletics franchise has not retired any jersey numbers for players from their Philadelphia years, all 12 players for whom the Phillies have retired a number or honored a "P" have been inducted into the Wall of Fame: Robin Roberts (1978), Richie Ashburn (1979), Chuck Klein (1980), Grover Cleveland Alexander (1981), Jim Bunning (1984), Steve Carlton (1989), Mike Schmidt (1990), Dick Allen (1994), Roy Halladay (2021), Ed Delahanty (2025), Billy Hamilton (2025), and Sam Thompson (2025).

Key to symbols and abbreviations used in tables below
| Inducted | Links to the article about the corresponding Major League Baseball season. |
| Years | Link to the articles about the Major League Baseball seasons in which the player participated with their inducted team |
| P | Pitcher (RHP indicates right-handed; LHP indicates left-handed) |
| C | Catcher |
| 1B | First baseman |
| 2B | Second baseman |
| 3B | Third baseman |
| SS | Shortstop |
| OF | Outfielder |
| MGR | Manager |
| GM | General manager |
| EXEC | Team executive |
| CO | Coach |
| TV | Team sportscaster (television and/or radio) |
| † | Member of the National Baseball Hall of Fame and Museum |
| | Recipient of the Hall of Fame's Ford C. Frick Award |

Philadelphia Baseball Wall of Fame
| Inducted | Player | Team^{[a]} | Position | Years | Ref |
|---|---|---|---|---|---|
| 1978 | Robin Roberts^{†}^{[b]} | Philadelphia Phillies | P | 1948–1961 | |
| 1978 | Connie Mack^{†} | Philadelphia Athletics | MGR | 1901–1950 | |
| 1979 | Richie Ashburn^{†}^{[b]} | Philadelphia Phillies | OF; TV | 1948–1959; 1963–1997 | |
| 1979 | Jimmie Foxx^{†} | Philadelphia Athletics | 1B | 1925–1935 | |
| 1980 | Chuck Klein^{†}^{[b]} | Philadelphia Phillies | OF | 1928–1933; 1936–1939; 1940–1944 | |
| 1980 | Lefty Grove^{†} | Philadelphia Athletics | P | 1925–1933 | |
| 1981 | Grover Cleveland Alexander^{†}^{[b]} | Philadelphia Phillies | P | 1911–1917; 1930 | |
| 1981 | Al Simmons^{†} | Philadelphia Athletics | P | 1924–1932; 1940–1941; 1944 | |
| 1982 | Del Ennis | Philadelphia Phillies | OF | 1946–1956 | |
| 1982 | Mickey Cochrane^{†} | Philadelphia Athletics | C | 1925–1933 | |
| 1983 | no inductees—see Centennial Team | | | | |
| 1984 | Jim Bunning^{†}^{[b]} | Philadelphia Phillies | P | 1964–1969; 1970–1971 | |
| 1984 | Jimmy Dykes | Philadelphia Athletics | 2B/3B; MGR | 1918–1932; 1951–1953 | |
| 1985 | Ed Delahanty^{†} | Philadelphia Phillies | OF | 1888–1889; 1891–1901 | |
| 1985 | Eddie Plank^{†} | Philadelphia Athletics | P | 1901–1914 | |
| 1986 | Cy Williams | Philadelphia Phillies | OF | 1918–1930 | |
| 1986 | Rube Waddell^{†} | Philadelphia Athletics | P | 1902–1907 | |
| 1987 | Granny Hamner | Philadelphia Phillies | SS | 1944–1959 | |
| 1987 | Eddie Collins^{†} | Philadelphia Athletics | 2B | 1906–1914; 1927–1930 | |
| 1988 | Paul Owens | Philadelphia Phillies | MGR; GM; EXEC | 1972, 1983–1984; 1972–1983; 1984–2003 | |
| 1988 | Wally Moses | Philadelphia Athletics | OF | 1935–1941; 1949–1951 | |
| 1989 | Steve Carlton^{†}^{[b]} | Philadelphia Phillies | P | 1972–1986 | |
| 1989 | Bob Johnson | Philadelphia Athletics | OF | 1933–1942 | |
| 1990 | Mike Schmidt^{†}^{[b]} | Philadelphia Phillies | 3B | 1972–1989 | |
| 1990 | Elmer Valo | Philadelphia Athletics | OF | 1940–1943; 1946–1956 | |
| 1991 | Larry Bowa | Philadelphia Phillies | SS; MGR | 1970–1981; 2001–2004 | |
| 1991 | Chief Bender^{†} | Philadelphia Athletics | P | 1903–1914 | |
| 1992 | Chris Short | Philadelphia Phillies | P | 1959–1972 | |
| 1992 | Jack Coombs | Philadelphia Athletics | P | 1906–1914 | |
| 1993 | Curt Simmons | Philadelphia Phillies | P | 1947–1960 | |
| 1993 | Frank "Home Run" Baker^{†} | Philadelphia Athletics | 3B | 1908–1914 | |
| 1994 | Dick Allen^{†} | Philadelphia Phillies | 1B/3B/OF | 1963–1969; 1975–1976 | |
| 1994 | Bobby Shantz | Philadelphia Athletics | P | 1949–1956 | |
| 1995 | Willie Jones | Philadelphia Phillies | 3B | 1947–1959 | |
| 1995 | Eddie Joost | Philadelphia Athletics | SS; MGR | 1947–1954; 1954 | |
| 1996 | Sam Thompson^{†} | Philadelphia Phillies | OF | 1889–1898 | |
| 1996 | Eddie Rommel | Philadelphia Athletics | P | 1920–1932 | |
| 1997 | Johnny Callison | Philadelphia Phillies | OF | 1960–1969 | |
| 1997 | Ferris Fain | Philadelphia Athletics | 1B | 1947–1952 | |
| 1998 | Greg Luzinski | Philadelphia Phillies | OF | 1970–1980 | |
| 1998 | Bing Miller | Philadelphia Athletics | OF | 1922–1926; 1928–1934 | |
| 1999 | Tug McGraw | Philadelphia Phillies | P | 1975–1984 | |
| 1999 | Sam Chapman | Philadelphia Athletics | OF | 1938–1951 | |
| 2000 | Gavvy Cravath | Philadelphia Phillies | OF; MGR | 1912–1920; 1919–1920 | |
| 2000 | George Earnshaw | Philadelphia Athletics | P | 1928–1933 | |
| 2001 | Garry Maddox | Philadelphia Phillies | OF | 1975–1986 | |
| 2001 | Gus Zernial | Philadelphia Athletics | OF | 1951–1957 | |
| 2002 | Tony Taylor | Philadelphia Phillies | 2B | 1960–1971; 1974–1976 | |
| 2002 | Rube Walberg | Philadelphia Athletics | P | 1923–1933 | |
| 2003 | Sherry Magee | Philadelphia Phillies | OF | 1904–1914 | |
| 2003 | Rube Oldring | Philadelphia Athletics | OF | 1906–1916; 1918 | |
Philadelphia Phillies Wall of Fame
| Inducted | Player | Team^{[a]} | Position | Years | Ref |
| 2004 | Billy Hamilton^{†} | Philadelphia Phillies | OF | 1890–1895 | |
| 2005 | Bob Boone | Philadelphia Phillies | C | 1972–1982 | |
| 2006 | Dallas Green | Philadelphia Phillies | P MGR | 1960–1967; 1979–1981 | |
| 2007 | John Vukovich | Philadelphia Phillies | INF; CO; EXEC | 1970–1971, 1976–1981; 1988–2004; 2004–2007 | |
| 2008 | Juan Samuel | Philadelphia Phillies | 2B; CO | 1983–1989; 2011–2017 | |
| 2009 | Harry Kalas^{†} | Philadelphia Phillies | TV | 1971–2009 | |
| 2010 | Darren Daulton | Philadelphia Phillies | C | 1983; 1985–1997 | |
| 2011 | John Kruk | Philadelphia Phillies | 1B; TV | 1989–1994; 2017–present | |
| 2012 | Mike Lieberthal | Philadelphia Phillies | C | 1994–2006 | |
| 2013 | Curt Schilling | Philadelphia Phillies | P | 1992–2000 | |
| 2014 | Charlie Manuel | Philadelphia Phillies | MGR CO | 2005–2013, 2019 | |
| 2015 | Pat Burrell | Philadelphia Phillies | OF | 2000–2008 | |
| 2016 | Jim Thome^{†} | Philadelphia Phillies | 1B | 2003–2005, 2012 | |
| 2017 | No inductees (Note: On April 10, 2017, it was announced Pete Rose would be that year's inductee into the Wall of Fame (Rose is already a member of the 1983 Centennial Team, but was planned to be honored with his own individual plaque). However, on August 12, 2017, just ten days before the ceremony, the Phillies announced Rose would not be inducted amid recent statutory rape allegations. The Phillies would ultimately not induct a new member of the Wall of Fame for 2017, and instead honored past members.) | | | | |
| 2018 | Pat Gillick^{†} | Philadelphia Phillies | GM; EXEC | 2005–2008; 2008–present | |
| 2018 | Roy Halladay^{†}^{[b]} | Philadelphia Phillies | P | 2010–2013 | |
| 2019 | Bobby Abreu | Philadelphia Phillies | OF | 1998–2006 | |
| 2021 | Manny Trillo | Philadelphia Phillies | 2B | 1979–1982 | |
| 2022 | Bake McBride | Philadelphia Phillies | RF/CF | 1977–1981 | |
| 2022 | Ron Reed | Philadelphia Phillies | P | 1976–1983 | |
| 2023 | Ruly Carpenter | Philadelphia Phillies | EXEC | 1963–1981 | |
| 2023 | John Quinn | Philadelphia Phillies | GM | 1959–1972 | |
| 2023 | Scott Rolen^{†} | Philadelphia Phillies | 3B | 1996–2002 | |
| 2024 | David Montgomery | Philadelphia Phillies | EXEC | 1971–2019 | |
| 2025 | Jimmy Rollins | Philadelphia Phillies | SS | 2000–2014 | |
| 2025 | Ed Wade | Philadelphia Phillies | GM | 1998–2005 | |
| 2026 | Chase Utley | Philadelphia Phillies | 2B | 2003–2015 | |

== Centennial Team ==
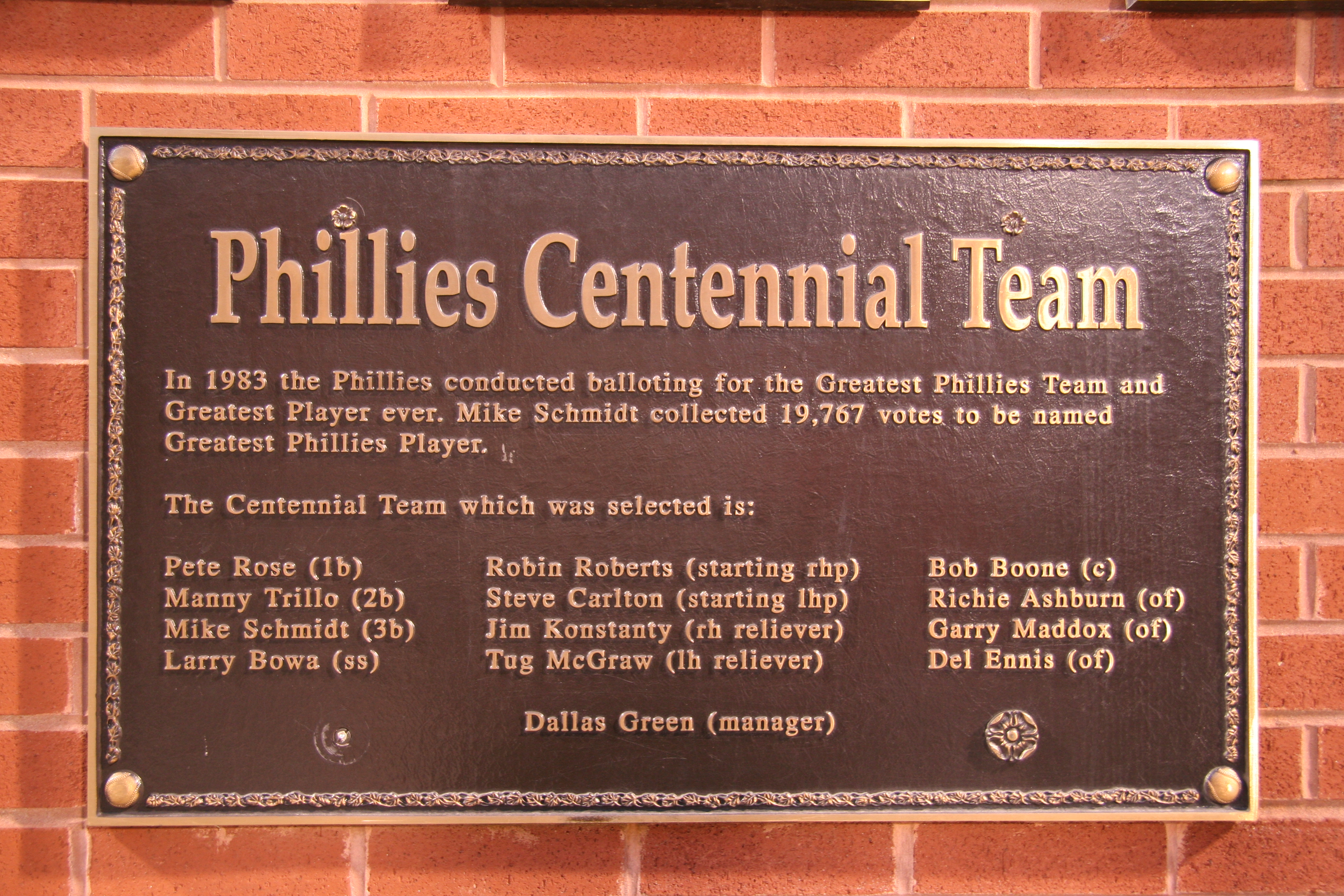
The Centennial Team plaque at the left end of the Wall of Fame

In 1983, rather than inducting a player into the Wall of Fame, the Phillies selected their Centennial Team, commemorating the best players of the first 100 years in franchise history. The Centennial Team includes players from several periods in Phillies history. The team is honored with a plaque listing the names of all players selected at the left end of the Wall of Fame. 11 members of the Centennial Team also have their own individual plaques on the Wall, with Jim Konstanty and Pete Rose being the only players on the team without ones.

| Player | Position |
|---|---|
| Richie Ashburn^{†}^{[b]} | CF |
| Bob Boone | C |
| Larry Bowa | SS |
| Steve Carlton^{†}^{[b]} | LHP |
| Garry Maddox | CF |
| Dallas Green | MGR |
| Jim Konstanty | RHP |
| Del Ennis | OF |
| Tug McGraw | LHP |
| Robin Roberts^{†}^{[b]} | RHP |
| Pete Rose | 1B |
| Mike Schmidt^{†}^{[b]} | 3B |
| Manny Trillo | 2B |

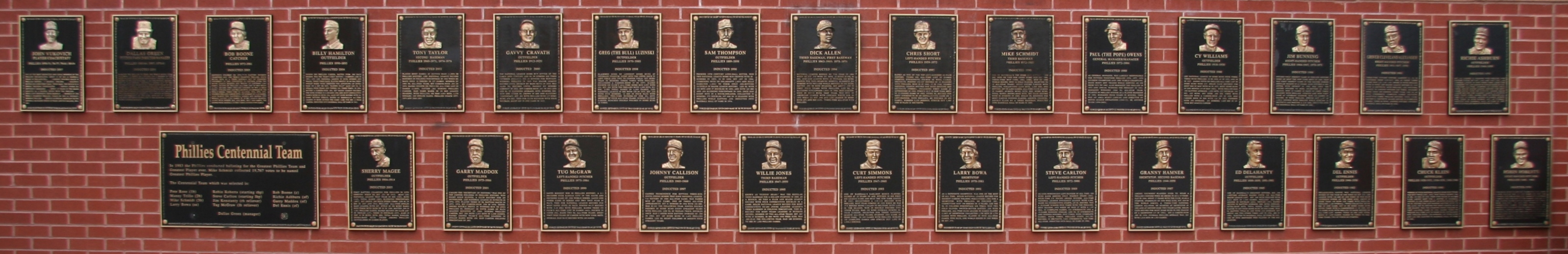
The Phillies' Wall of Fame at Citizens Bank Park in 2008. The Centennial Team plaque is placed in the bottom row on the left-hand side of the image.

== Footnotes ==
- ^{a} The induction committee judges entrants based on "longevity, ability, contributions to the [team] and baseball, character and special achievements". The committee has consisted of a variety of personnel, including team executives and members of the media.
- ^{b} This denotes that the player's number has been retired by his respective team. The Athletics have not retired any numbers from those who played their careers in Philadelphia.
