= Greg Luzinski =

American baseball player (born 1950)

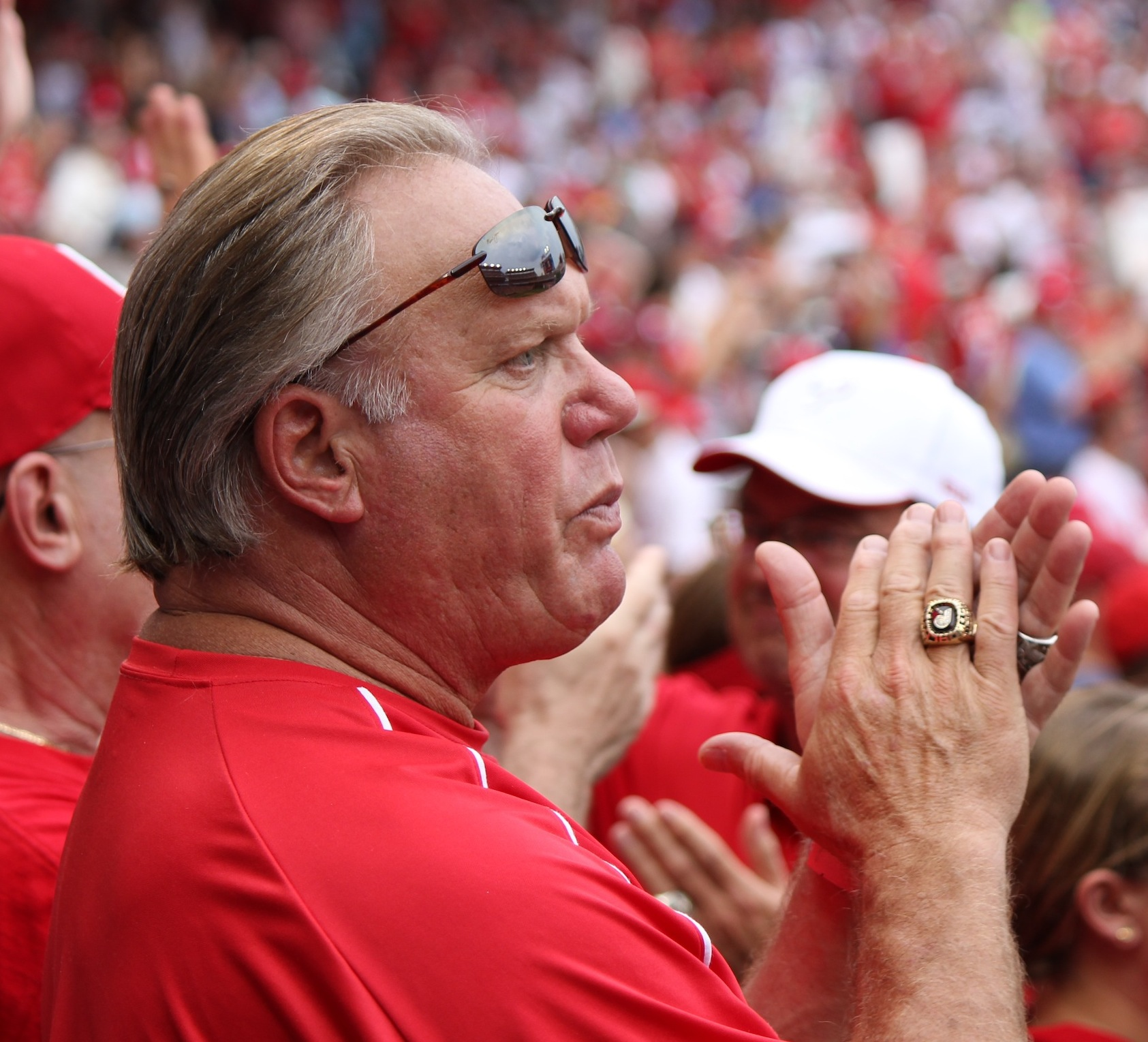
- Luzinski in 2011
- Left fielder / Designated hitter
- Born: November 22, 1950 (age 75); Chicago, Illinois, U.S.
- Batted: Right Threw: Right

MLB debut
- September 9, 1970, for the Philadelphia Phillies

Last MLB appearance
- September 24, 1984, for the Chicago White Sox

MLB statistics
- Batting average: .276
- Home runs: 307
- Runs batted in: 1,128
- Stats at Baseball Reference

Teams
- Philadelphia Phillies (1970–1980); Chicago White Sox (1981–1984)

Career highlights and awards
- 4× All-Star (1975–1978); World Series champion (1980); Roberto Clemente Award (1978); NL RBI leader (1975); Philadelphia Phillies Wall of Fame

Gregory Michael Luzinski (born November 22, 1950), nicknamed "the Bull", is an American former professional baseball player. He played in Major League Baseball as a left fielder from 1970 to 1984, most prominently as a member of the Philadelphia Phillies where he was a four-time All-Star player and was a member of the 1980 World Series winning team. Together with Mike Schmidt, he formed a power-hitting tandem for the Philadelphia Phillies teams of the 1970s.

Luzinski was the 1975 National League (NL) RBI champion and, in 1978 he was named the recipient of the prestigious Roberto Clemente Award for his involvement in local community affairs. He ended his career playing for the Chicago White Sox. In 1998, Luzinski was inducted into the Philadelphia Phillies Wall of Fame.

== Biography ==
Born in Chicago, Luzinski attended Notre Dame High School in Niles, Illinois. He was drafted by the Philadelphia Phillies with the 11th overall pick in the 1968 MLB draft. He made his MLB debut on September 9, 1970, at age 19, pinch-hitting for the Phillies in a loss to the New York Mets at Shea Stadium.

== Playing career ==
At 6 ft 1 in (1.85 m) and weighing 255 pounds (116 kg), Luzinski was a well-liked Phillie. He was also one of the more feared sluggers of his era, and had a well-earned reputation as a clutch hitter, particularly in the playoffs. He was also a capable left fielder, although an ill-timed error during the Phillies' infamous Black Friday playoff game in 1977 (which was amplified by errors during the same inning by two other Phillies) cast a undeserved shadow over his fielding abilities. However Luzinski led the league in fielding percentage in 1973, and he was routinely among the league leaders in assists. Luzinski maintained a respectable batting average throughout his career. He hit .300 or better for three consecutive seasons during the prime of his career, and was a career .276 hitter, with 307 home runs, and 1,128 RBIs. Luzinski was selected to be a National League (NL) All-Star every year between 1975 and 1978, highlighted by the home run he hit off Jim Palmer in the 1977 All-Star Game. In 1978, Luzinski was the top NL All-Star vote-getter. He was also the National League’s Most Valuable Player (MVP) runner-up in 1975 when he led the National League with 120 RBIs and 322 total bases; and in 1977, when he posted career highs in batting average (.309), home runs (39), and RBIs (130).

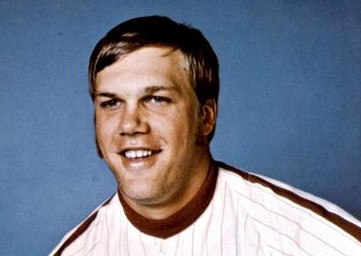
Luzinski, circa 1972

He hit safely in every postseason game — and had at least one home run in each of the three National League Championship Series (NLCS)—played by the Phillies from 1976 to 1978, though Philadelphia did not advance to the World Series in any of those years. In the ninth inning of pivotal Game 3 of the 1977 NLCS, Luzinski misplayed a two-out Manny Mota fly ball, trapping the ball against the left-field wall and allowing the inning to continue. Errors by Mike Schmidt and Gene Garber the same inning sealed the deal for a day that Phillies fans would thereafter refer to as Black Friday. The Dodgers scored three runs in the inning and won the game, and eventually won the series.

One of the first Phillies to buy seats at games for impoverished children, Luzinski was honored with the Roberto Clemente Award in 1978. In 1980, he suffered a major slump with injuries in the regular season, batting just .228, with 19 home runs, and 56 RBIs in 106 games, but came back with two game-winning hits in the 1980 National League Championship Series: a two-out two-run home run in the bottom of the 6th inning in Game 1 (the only home run hit in the entire 1980 NLCS); and a pinch-hit RBI double to score Pete Rose in the top of the 10th inning of Game 4, as Philadelphia went on to beat the Houston Astros in five games. Those hits against Houston, the biggest hits of his career, were among the most significant in franchise history; that team went on to bring the Phillies their first world championship, beating the Kansas City Royals in the 1980 World Series in six games. Luzinski had a hit in thirteen consecutive league championship series games (Game 1 1976 NLCS to Game 2 of the 1980 NLCS), which was briefly a record for the longest consecutive-game-hitting streak until he was surpassed by Pete Rose.

He joined the Chicago White Sox the next season and became one of the top sluggers and designated hitters in the American League. With the White Sox, he was chosen the Designated Hitter of the Year for 1981 and also in 1983, the season when he set a then-record for most home runs in a season by a designated hitter with 32, and thrice hit the roof of the old Comiskey Park in Chicago. Luzinski hit home runs in five consecutive games, a franchise mark, which has since been tied by Ron Kittle, Frank Thomas (twice), Carlos Lee, and Paul Konerko. Luzinski returned to the postseason in the 1983 American League Championship Series, which the Sox lost to Baltimore three games to one.

Luzinski hit grand slams in two consecutive games in 1984. He became a free agent at the end of the 1984 season but chose to retire on February 4, 1985.

== Career statistics ==
G	PA	AB	R	H	2B	3B	HR	RBI	BB	SO	AVG	OBP	SLG	FLD%
1821	7518	6505	880	1795	344	24	307	1128	845	1495	.276	.363	.478	.975

== Post-retirement ==
From his retirement from professional baseball in 1985 until 1992, Luzinski was the head baseball coach, and later head football coach, at Holy Cross Academy in Delran Township, New Jersey.

Still a fan favorite in Philadelphia, he started "Bull's Barbecue" in Section 140 at Citizens Bank Park when the Phillies opened the new stadium in 2004. The barbeque stand was inspired by "Boog's BBQ" at Oriole Park at Camden Yards, and Luzinski can usually be found there until after the seventh inning for all Phillies home games.

He lives in Bonita Springs, Florida.

His son, Ryan, was the first-round pick of the Los Angeles Dodgers in the 1992 Major League Baseball draft. Ryan was a promising power hitter when he spurned a letter of intent with the University of Miami to sign with the Dodgers. However, he bounced around the team's farm system until a trade to the Baltimore Orioles in 1997. In eight minor league seasons, he hit .265 with 49 home runs and 296 RBI but could never make the move from AAA to the Majors.

== Honors and awards ==
The Roberto Clemente Award, given annually to a Major League Baseball player who demonstrates sportsmanship and community involvement, was presented to Luzinski in 1978.

In 1989, Luzinski was inducted into the National Polish-American Sports Hall of Fame.

== See also ==
- List of Major League Baseball career home run leaders
- List of Major League Baseball career runs batted in leaders
- List of Major League Baseball annual runs batted in leaders

Preceded by Willie Crawford; George Foster	National League Player of the Month; June, 1973; July, 1977	Succeeded by Pete Rose; George Foster
