= Philadelphia Phillies all-time roster (T–V) =

List of baseball players

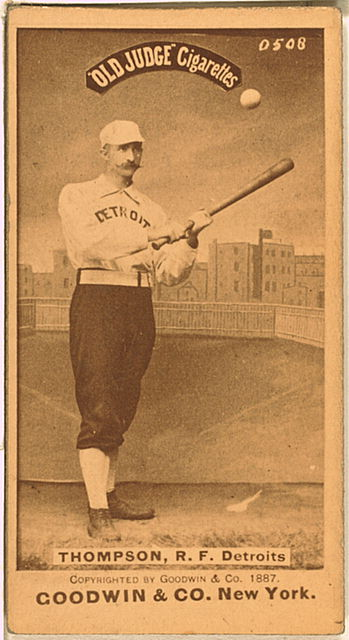
Sam Thompson, a Hall of Fame and Philadelphia Baseball Wall of Fame member, holds the Phillies' single-season record for triples (28 in 1894).

The Philadelphia Phillies are a Major League Baseball team based in Philadelphia, Pennsylvania. They are a member of the Eastern Division of Major League Baseball's National League. The team has played officially under two names since beginning play in 1883: the current moniker, as well as the "Quakers", which was used in conjunction with "Phillies" during the team's early history. The team was also known unofficially as the "Blue Jays" during the World War II era. Since the franchise's inception, 2,081 players have made an appearance in a competitive game for the team, whether as an offensive player (batting and baserunning) or a defensive player (fielding, pitching, or both).

Of those 2,081 Phillies, 58 have had surnames beginning with the letter T, 6 have had names beginning with U, and 24 have had surnames beginning with the letter V. One player, Sam Thompson, has been inducted into the Baseball Hall of Fame; he played ten seasons (1889–1898) for Philadelphia and set the franchise's record for most triples in a single season in 1894. The Hall of Fame lists the Phillies as Thompson's primary team, and he is a member of the Philadelphia Baseball Wall of Fame, as are second baseman Tony Taylor; Elmer Valo, who was inducted for his contributions as a member of the crosstown Philadelphia Athletics; and John Vukovich, who was primarily a third baseman during his playing days with the Phillies and was inducted for his years of service to the Phillies. In addition to three tenures as a player (1970–1971, 1976–1977, 1979–1981), Vukovich was a coach and team advisor from 1983 to 2004.

Among the 54 batters in this list, Tuck Turner has the best batting average; he batted .380 in four seasons with Philadelphia. Other players with an average above .300 include Thompson (.334 in ten seasons), Cotton Tierney (.317 in one season), and Andy Tracy (.357 in two seasons). Chase Utley leads all players on this list with 188 home runs, and Thompson's 963 runs batted in are best. In home runs, Jim Thome and Shane Victorino lead all players with surnames starting with T and V, with 96 and 79, respectively; in runs batted in, the U and V leaders are Utley (694) and Victorino (350).

Of this list's 34 pitchers, Bobby Thigpen has the best win–loss record, in terms of winning percentage; he won three games and lost one for a win ratio of .750 in his only season with Philadelphia. Jack Taylor leads this list with 96 victories and 77 defeats, and Wayne Twitchell has the most strikeouts, with 573. Erskine Thomason's 0.00 earned run average (ERA) is the lowest mark on this list; among pitchers who have allowed an earned run, Kent Tekulve, who holds the franchise's single-season record for appearances by a pitcher, has the best mark, with a 3.01 ERA. Among pitchers whose surnames begin with U, Tom Underwood has the best win–loss record, in terms of winning percentage; he won 28 games and lost 20 for a win ratio of .583 in his four seasons with Philadelphia. Underwood's 28 victories are the best among pitchers on this list whose names begin with U; Tom Vickery shares the mark among V-named pitchers. Dutch Ulrich has the most defeats among pitchers whose surnames start with U, with 27 in three seasons. Underwood has 245 strikeouts, best among the U-named pitchers; Vickery leads pitchers whose surnames begin with V in that category, with 177. Al Verdel has the best earned run average (ERA) among pitchers whose surnames start with V; he allowed no runs in his only career appearance for an ERA of 0.00. Ulrich's 3.48 ERA leads the pitchers whose surnames begin with U.

Key to symbols in player list(s)
† or ‡	Indicates a member of the National Baseball Hall of Fame and Museum; ‡ indicates that the Phillies are the player's primary team^{[H]}
§	Indicates a member of the Philadelphia Baseball Wall of Fame
*	Indicates a team record^{[R]}
(#)	A number following a player's name indicates that the number was retired by the Phillies in the player's honor.
Year	Italic text indicates that the player is a member of the Phillies' active (25-man) roster.
Position(s)	Indicates the player's primary position(s)^{[P]}
Notes	Statistics shown only for playing time with Phillies^{[S]}
Ref	References

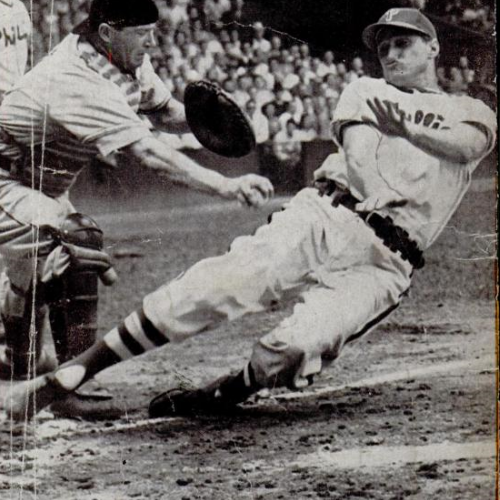
Jim Tabor hit 14 home runs in two seasons with the Phillies.

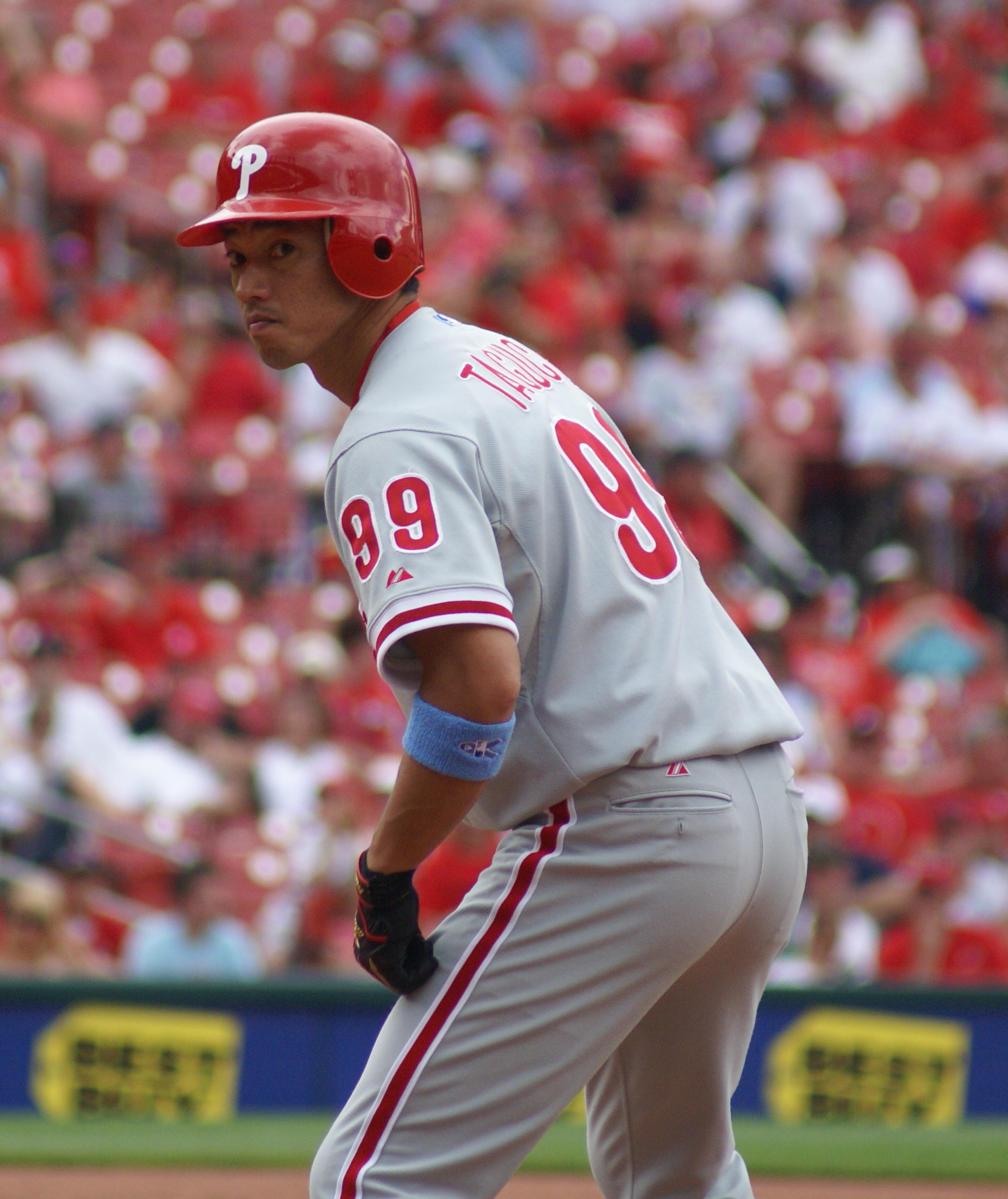
So Taguchi batted in nine runs in his only Philadelphia season.

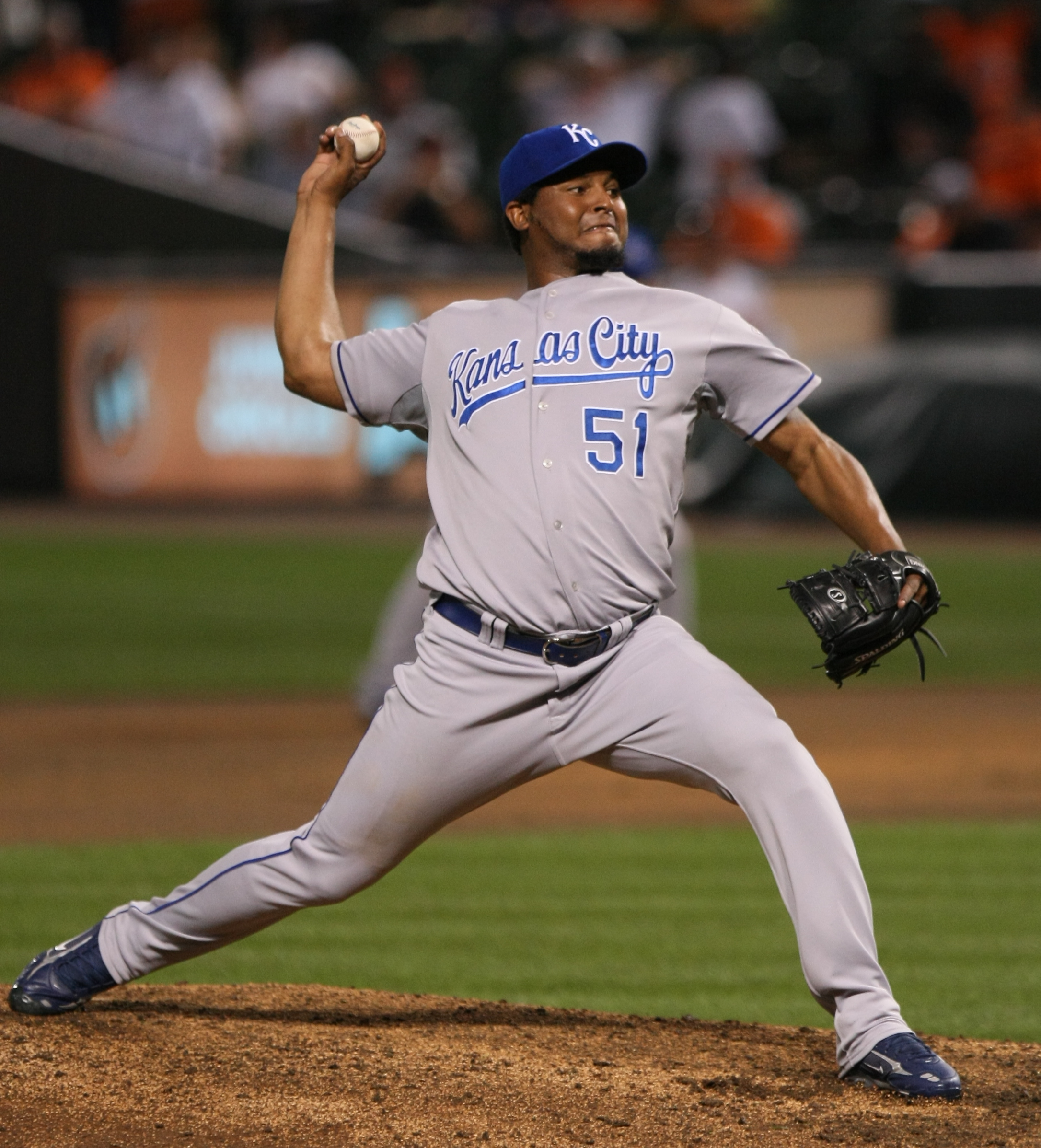
Robinson Tejeda won four games and lost three during the 2005 season.

Roy Thomas had two Phillies tenures: from 1899 to 1908, and again from 1910 to 1911.

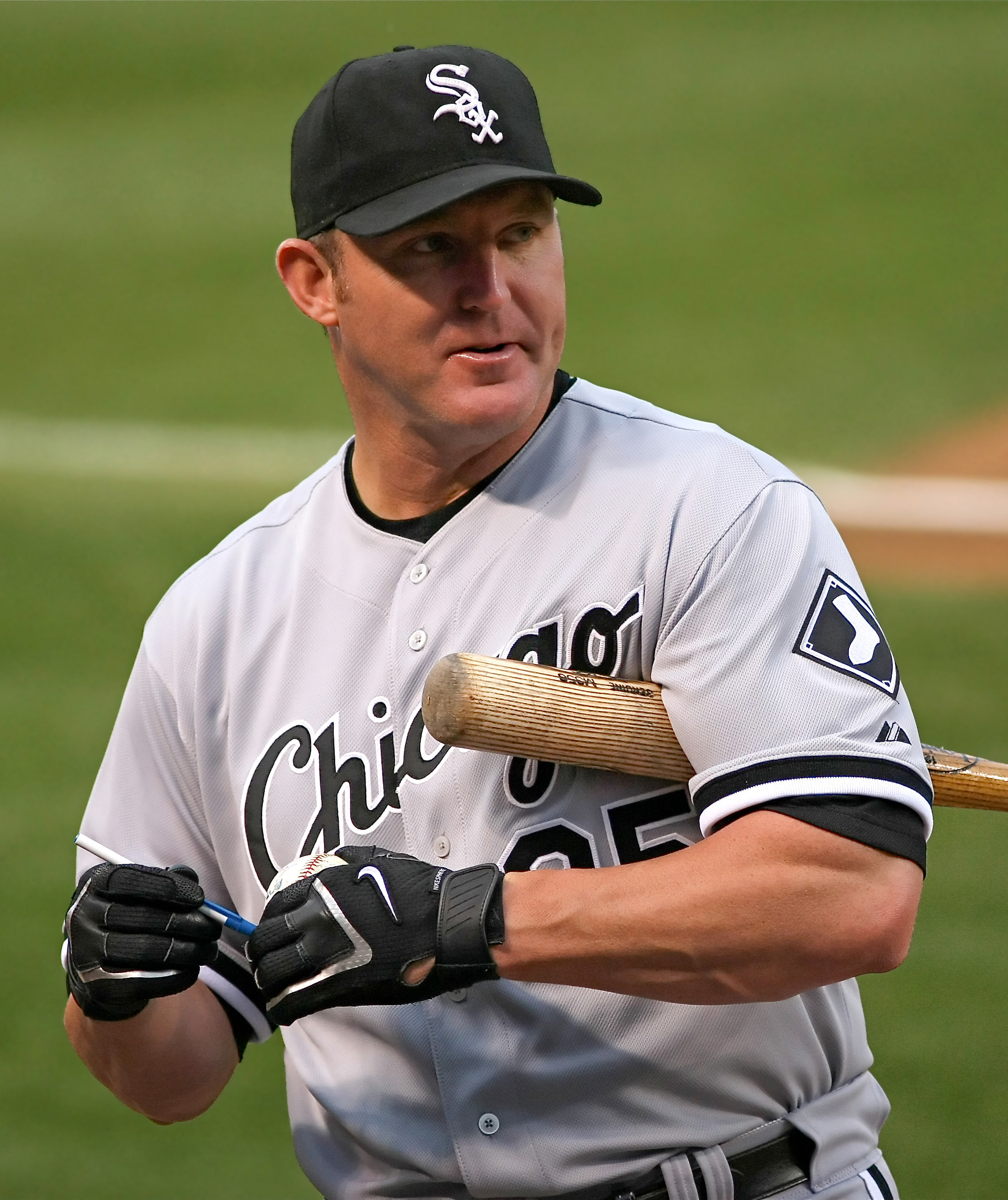
While with the Phillies, Jim Thome hit his 400th career home run.

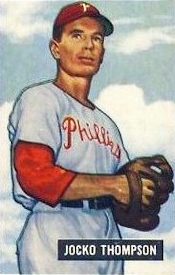
After his baseball career, Jocko Thompson had a bridge in the Netherlands named after him relating to his service in World War II.

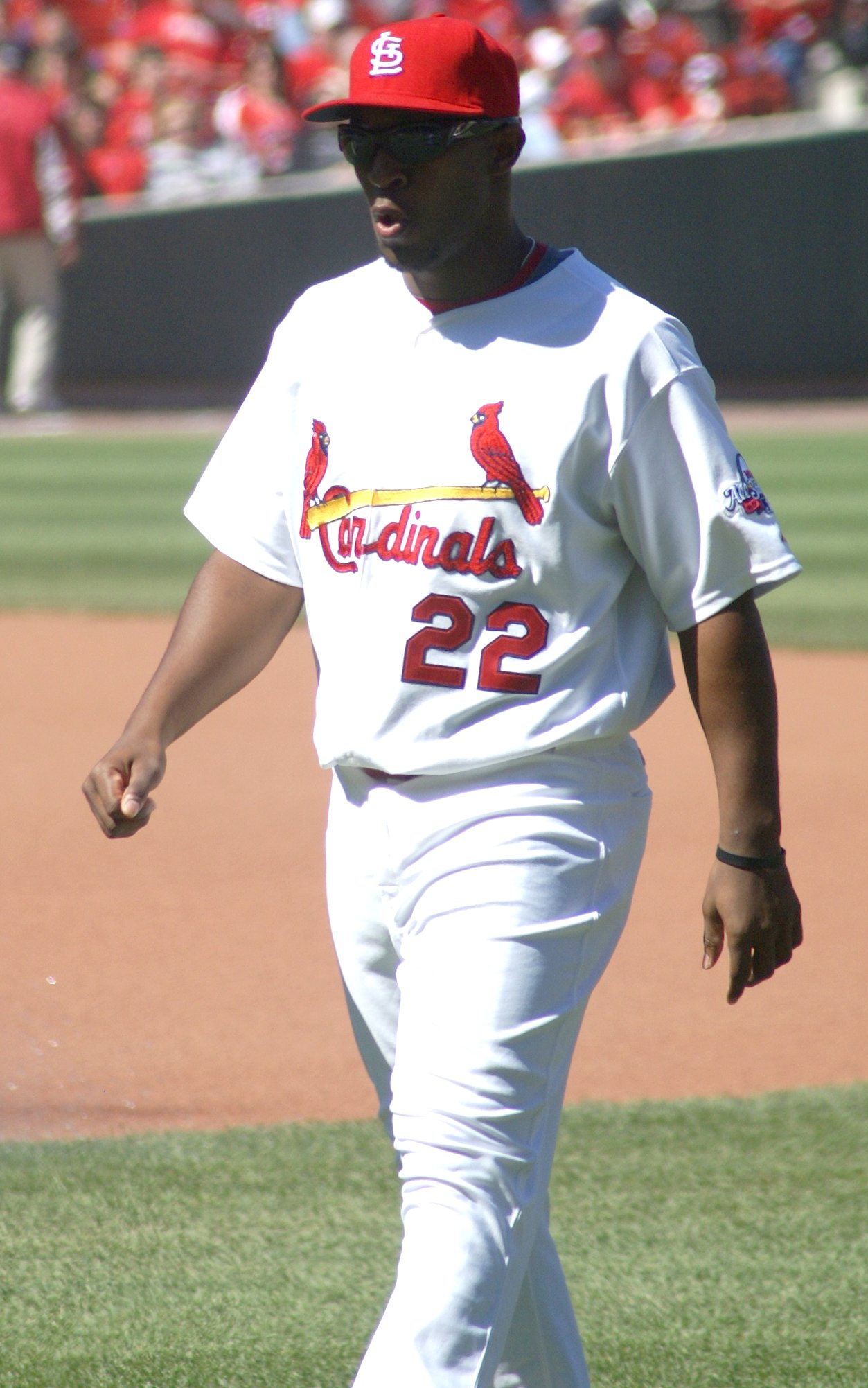
Second baseman Joe Thurston had a one-season tenure with the Phillies.

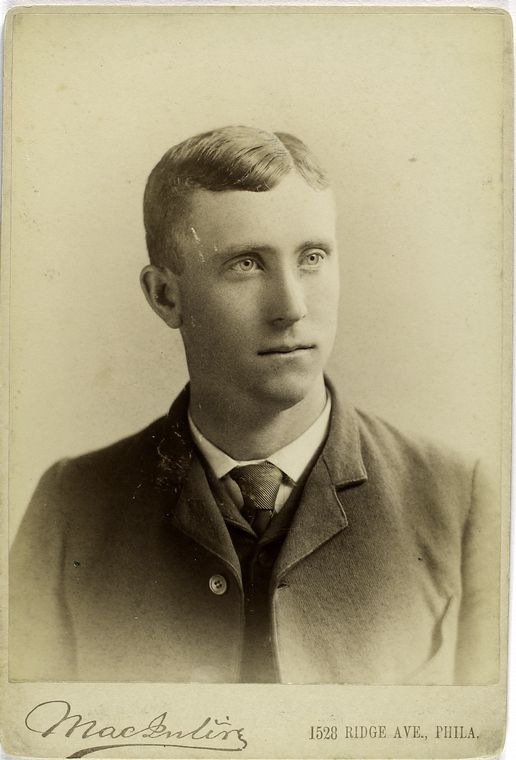
Ledell Titcomb won no games and lost five with Philadelphia in 1886.

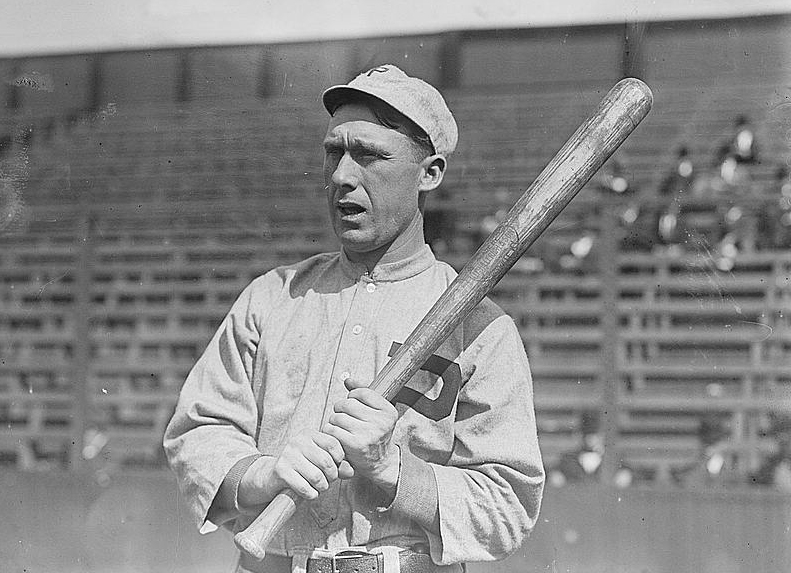
John Titus played ten seasons with the Phillies, batting in 475 runs.

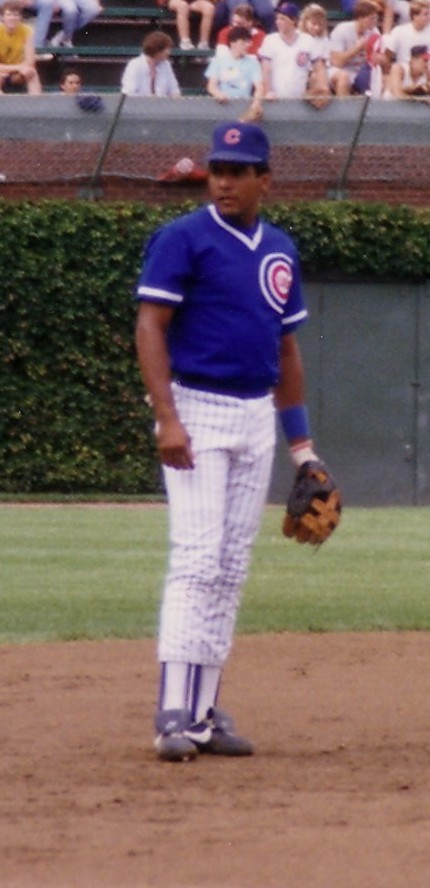
Manny Trillo was the Phillies' starting second baseman during their 1980 World Series-winning season.

List of players whose surnames begin with T, showing season(s) and position(s) played and selected statistics
Name	Season(s)	Position(s)	Notes	Ref
Lefty Taber	1926–1927	Pitcher	0–1 record; 10.80 earned run average; 10 walks	
Jim Tabor	1946–1947	Third baseman	.256 batting average; 14 home runs; 81 runs batted in	
So Taguchi	2008	Left fielder	.220 batting average; 6 extra-base hits; 9 runs batted in	
Doug Taitt	1931–1932	Left fielder	.222 batting average; 7 extra-base hits; 16 runs batted in	
Vito Tamulis	1941	Pitcher	0–1 record; 9.00 earned run average; 5 strikeouts	
Danny Tartabull	1997	Right fielder	.000 batting average; 2 runs scored; 11 plate appearances	
Jack Taschner	2009	Pitcher	1–1 record; 4.91 earned run average; 19 strikeouts	
Fred Tauby	1937	Left fielder Center fielder	.000 batting average; 3 runs batted in; 2 runs scored	
Jack Taylor	1892–1897	Pitcher	96–77 record; 4.34 earned run average; 402 strikeouts	
Reggie Taylor	2000–2001	Center fielder	.056 batting average; 1 hit; 2 runs scored	
Tony Taylor^{§}	1960–1971; 1974–1976	Second baseman	.261 batting average; 51 home runs; 461 runs batted in	
Robinson Tejeda	2005	Pitcher	4–3 record; 3.57 earned run average; 72 strikeouts	
Kent Tekulve	1985–1988	Pitcher	24–26 record; 3.01 earned run average; 196 strikeouts	
Amaury Telemaco	1999–2001; 2003–2005	Pitcher	10–15 record; 5.08 earned run average; 191 strikeouts	
Bob Terlecki	1972	Pitcher	4.73 earned run average; 5 strikeouts; 10 walks	
Tommy Thevenow	1929–1930	Shortstop	.265 batting average; 33 extra-base hits; 113 runs batted in	
Bobby Thigpen	1993	Pitcher	3–1 record; 6.05 earned run average; 10 strikeouts	
Dick Thoenen	1967	Pitcher	9.00 earned run average; 1 run allowed; 1 inning pitched	
Bill Thomas	1902	Left fielder	.118 batting average; 2 hits; 1 run scored	
Derrel Thomas	1985	Shortstop	.207 batting average; 4 home runs; 12 runs batted in	
Frank Thomas	1964–1965	First baseman	.282 batting average; 8 home runs; 33 runs batted in	
Roy Thomas	1899–1908; 1910–1911	Center fielder	.295 batting average; 264 runs batted in; 923 runs scored	
Tommy Thomas	1935	Pitcher	0–1 record; 5.25 earned run average; 3 strikeouts	
Valmy Thomas	1959	Catcher	.200 batting average; 1 home run; 7 runs batted in	
Erskine Thomason	1974	Pitcher	0.00 earned run average; 1 inning pitched; 1 strikeout	
Jim Thome	2003–2005	First baseman	.260 batting average; 96 home runs; 266 runs batted in	
Fresco Thompson	1927–1930	Second baseman	.300 batting average; 12 home runs; 219 runs batted in	
Jocko Thompson	1948–1951	Pitcher	6–11 record; 4.24 earned run average; 81 strikeouts	
Milt Thompson	1986–1988; 1993–1994	Center fielder Left fielder	.279 batting average; 22 home runs; 173 runs batted in	
Sam Thompson^{‡§}	1889–1898	Right fielder	.334 batting average; 95 home runs; 963 runs batted in	
Dickie Thon	1989–1991	Shortstop	.259 batting average; 32 home runs; 152 runs batted in	
John Thornton	1891–1892	Pitcher	15–18 record; 4.07 earned run average; 54 strikeouts	
Joe Thurston	2006	Second baseman	.222 batting average; 1 double; 3 runs scored	
Cotton Tierney	1923	Second baseman	.317 batting average; 11 home runs; 65 runs batted in	
Mike Timlin	2002	Pitcher	3–3 record; 3.79 earned run average; 15 strikeouts	
Ben Tincup	1914–1916; 1918	Pitcher	8–11 record; 2.93 earned run average; 124 strikeouts	
Lee Tinsley	1996	Left fielder	.135 batting average; 7 hits; 2 runs batted in	
Ledell Titcomb	1886	Pitcher	0–5 record; 3.73 earned run average; 24 strikeouts	
John Titus	1903–1912	Right fielder	.278 batting average; 31 home runs; 475 runs batted in	
Al Todd	1932–1935	Catcher	.281 batting average; 7 home runs; 102 runs batted in	
Bobby Tolan	1976–1977	First baseman	.253 batting average; 5 home runs; 36 runs batted in	
Freddie Toliver	1985–1987	Pitcher	1–7 record; 4.67 earned run average; 68 strikeouts	
Earl Torgeson	1953–1955	First baseman	.272 batting average; 17 home runs; 135 runs batted in	
Frank Torre	1962–1963	First baseman	.286 batting average; 1 home run; 30 runs batted in	
César Tovar	1973	Third baseman	.268 batting average; 1 home run; 21 runs batted in	
Happy Townsend	1901	Pitcher	9–6 record; 3.45 earned run average; 72 strikeouts	
Andy Tracy	2008–2009	First baseman	.357 batting average; 1 triple; 2 runs batted in	
Walt Tragesser	1919–1920	Catcher	.221 batting average; 6 home runs; 34 runs batted in	
Gus Triandos	1964–1965	Catcher	.226 batting average; 8 home runs; 37 runs batted in	
Manny Trillo	1979–1982	Second baseman	.277 batting average; 19 home runs; 160 runs batted in	
Ken Trinkle	1949	Pitcher	1–1 record; 4.00 earned run average; 14 strikeouts	
Coaker Triplett	1943–1945	Left fielder	.251 batting average; 22 home runs; 123 runs batted in	
Michael Tucker	2005	Center fielder	.222 batting average; 3 runs batted in; 3 runs scored	
Shane Turner	1988	Third baseman Shortstop	.171 batting average; 1 run batted in; 1 run scored	
Tuck Turner	1893–1896	Left fielder Right fielder	.380 batting average; 140 runs batted in; 190 runs scored	
Wayne Twitchell	1971–1977	Pitcher	33–43 record; 3.57 earned run average; 573 strikeouts	
Jim Tyng	1888	Pitcher	4.50 earned run average; 2 strikeouts; 2 walks	
Turkey Tyson	1944	Pinch hitter^{[a]}	.000 batting average; 1 plate appearance	

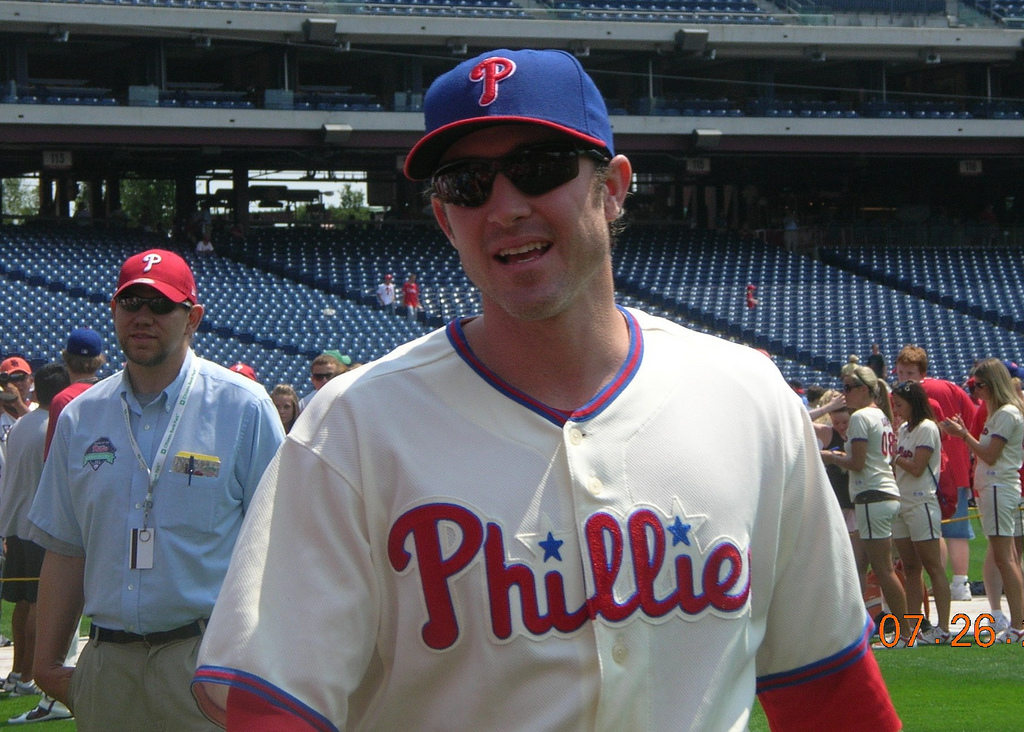
Chase Utley leads all batters in this list with 188 home runs as of the end of the 2011 season.

List of players whose surnames begin with U, showing season(s) and position(s) played and selected statistics
Name	Season(s)	Position(s)	Notes	Ref
Bob Uecker	1966–1967	Catcher	.202 batting average; 7 home runs; 37 runs batted in	
Dutch Ulrich	1925–1927	Pitcher	19–27 record; 3.48 earned run average; 123 strikeouts	
Tom Underwood	1974–1977	Pitcher	28–20 record; 4.02 earned run average; 245 strikeouts	
Del Unser	1973–1974; 1979–1982	Center fielder	.268 batting average; 28 home runs; 158 runs batted in	
Ugueth Urbina	2005	Pitcher	4–3 record; 4.13 earned run average; 66 strikeouts	
Chase Utley	2003–2011	Second baseman	.290 batting average; 188 home runs; 694 runs batted in	

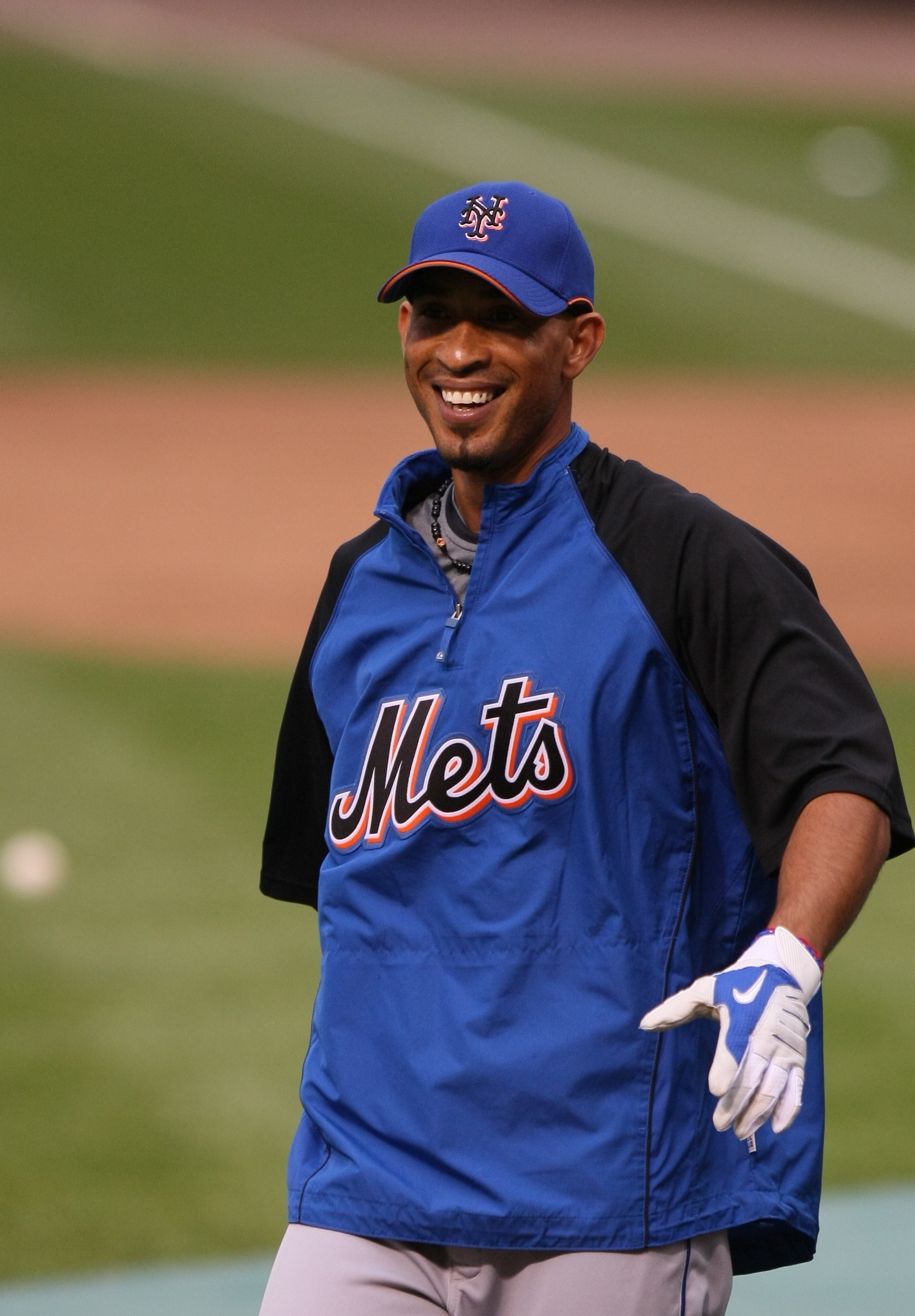
Infielder Wilson Valdez has hit more home runs with Philadelphia than he did with any of the other teams for whom he has played.

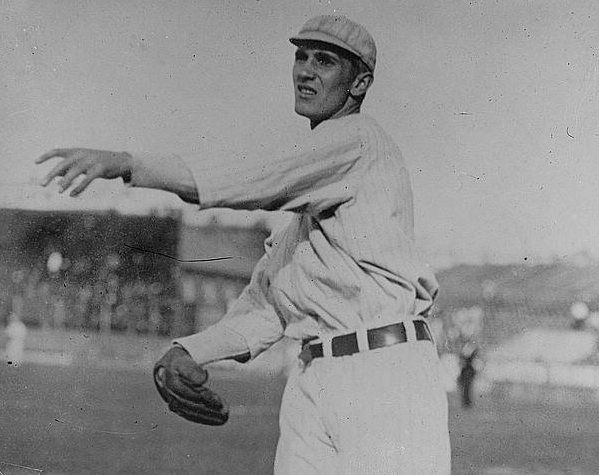
Ben Van Dyke struck out five batters and walked four in the 1909 season.

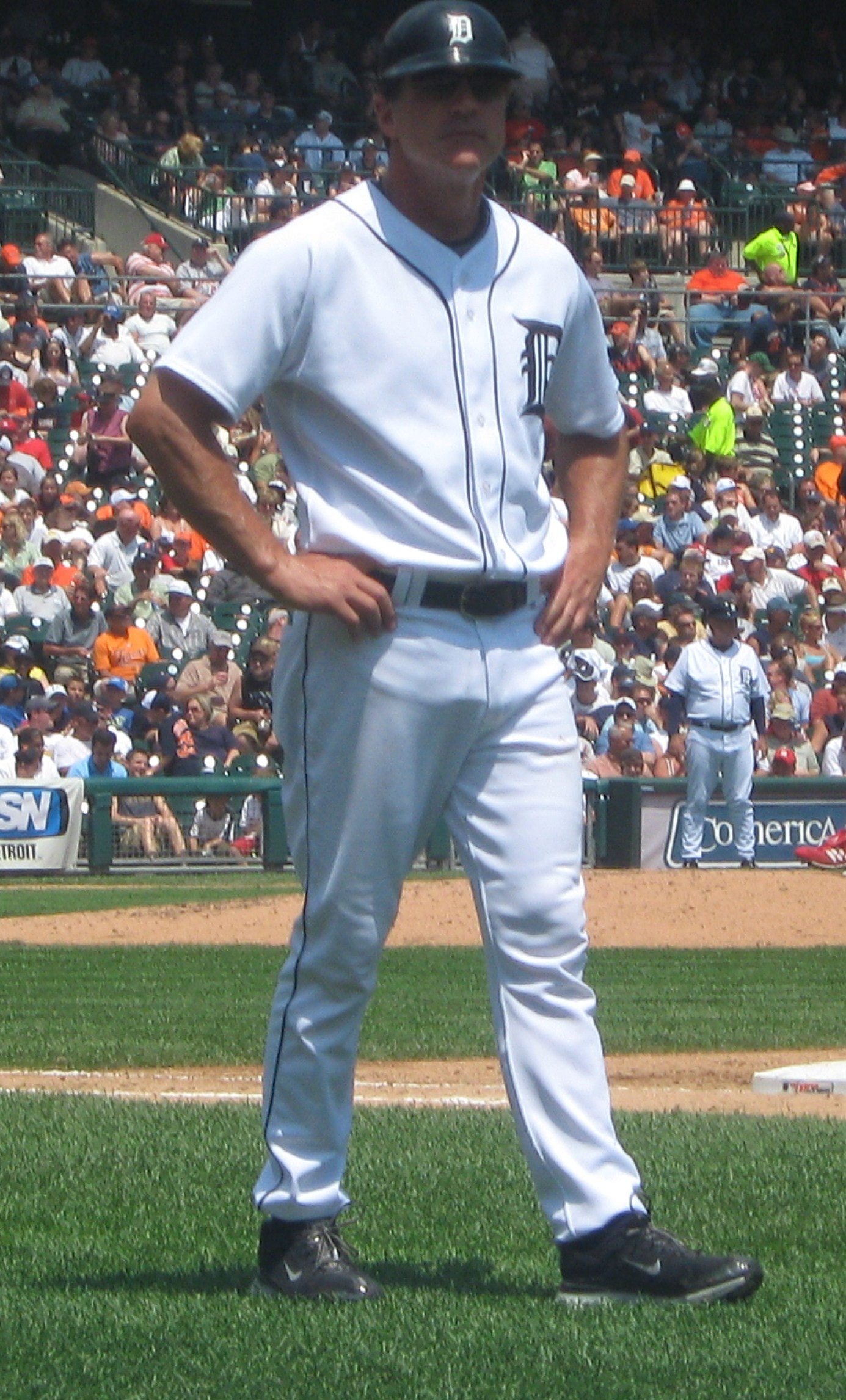
Andy Van Slyke batted .243 for the Phillies in 1995.

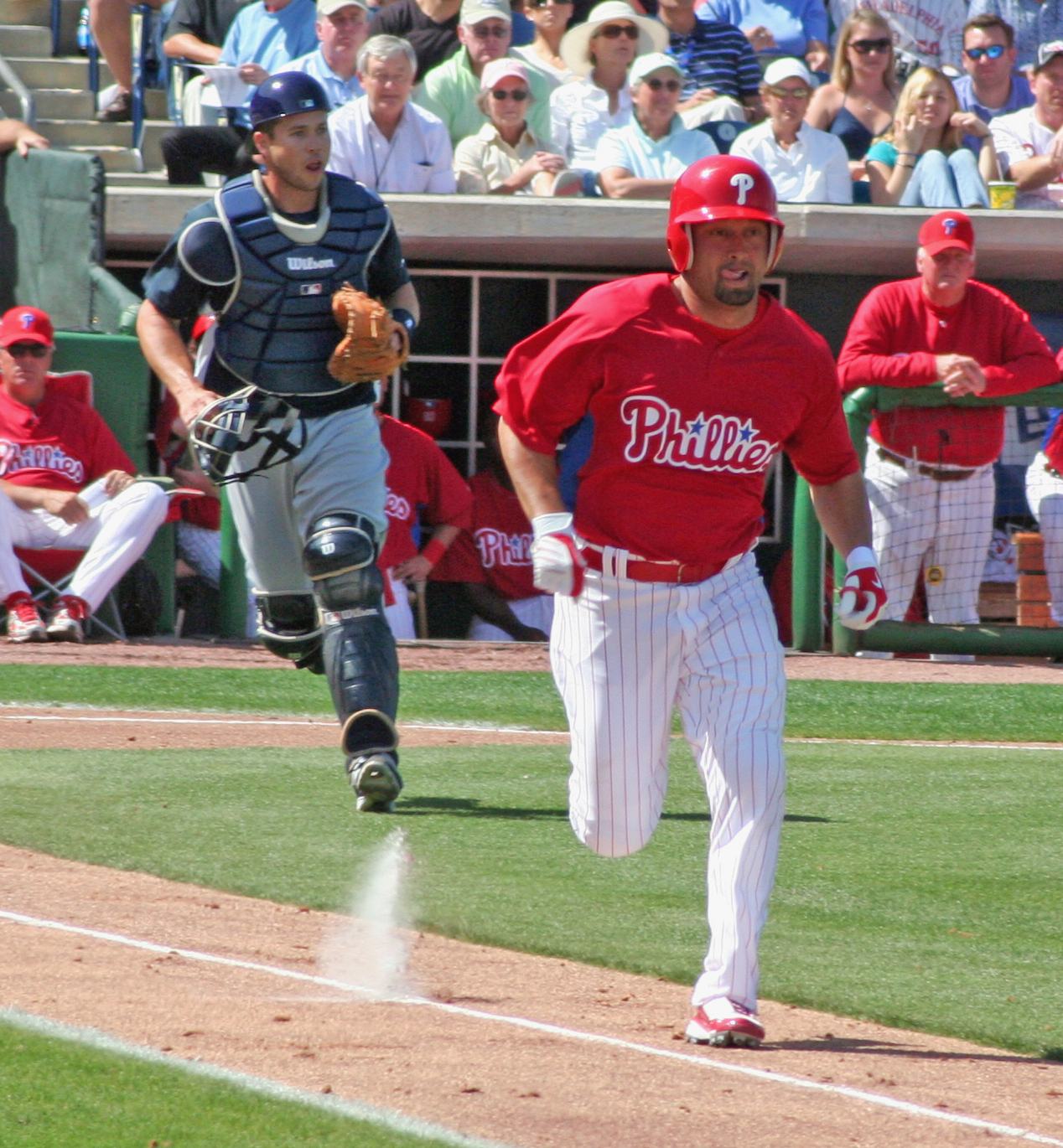
Shane Victorino has stolen 155 bases for the Phillies through the end of 2011.

List of players whose surnames begin with V, showing season(s) and position(s) played and selected statistics
Name	Season(s)	Position(s)	Notes	Ref
Gene Vadeboncoeur	1884	Catcher	.214 batting average; 3 runs batted in; 1 run scored	
Wilson Valdez	2010–2011	Shortstop; Second baseman	.254 batting average; 5 home runs; 65 runs batted in	
Eric Valent	2001–2002	Left fielder	.118 batting average; 1 run batted in; 4 runs scored	
Fernando Valenzuela	1994	Pitcher	1–2 record; 3.00 earned run average; 19 strikeouts	
Elmer Valo^{§}	1956; 1961	Right fielder	.275 batting average; 6 home runs; 45 runs batted in	
Deacon Van Buren	1904	Left fielder	.233 batting average; 3 runs batted in; 2 runs scored	
Fred Van Dusen	1955	Pinch hitter^{[b]}	1.000 on-base percentage; Hit by 1 pitch; 1 plate appearance	
Ben Van Dyke	1909	Pitcher	3.68 earned run average; 5 strikeouts; 4 walks	
Andy Van Slyke	1995	Center fielder	.243 batting average; 3 home runs; 16 runs batted in	
Gary Varsho	1995	Right fielder Left fielder	.252 batting average; 2 extra-base hits; 11 runs batted in	
Jim Vatcher	1990	Left fielder Right fielder	.261 batting average; 1 home run; 4 runs batted in	
Emil Verban	1946–1948	Second baseman	.273 batting average; 50 extra-base hits; 87 runs batted in	
Joe Verbanic	1966	Pitcher	1–1 record; 5.14 earned run average; 7 strikeouts	
Al Verdel	1944	Pitcher	0.00 earned run average; 1 inning pitched; 1 game finished	
Johnny Vergez	1935–1936	Third baseman	.251 batting average; 10 home runs; 68 runs batted in	
Tom Vickery	1890; 1893	Pitcher	28–26 record; 3.78 earned run average; 177 strikeouts	
Shane Victorino	2005–2011	Center fielder	.282 batting average; 79 home runs; 350 runs batted in	
Bob Vines	1925	Pitcher	11.25 earned run average; 3 walks; 4 innings pitched	
Bill Vinton	1884–1885	Pitcher	13–16 record; 2.47 earned run average; 126 strikeouts	
Ozzie Virgil, Jr.	1980–1985	Catcher	.246 batting average; 46 home runs; 154 runs batted in	
Cy Vorhees	1902	Pitcher	3–3 record; 3.86 earned run average; 24 strikeouts	
Ed Vosberg	2000–2001	Pitcher	1–1 record; 3.68 earned run average; 34 strikeouts	
George Vukovich	1980–1982	Right fielder	.272 batting average; 7 home runs; 54 runs batted in	
John Vukovich^{§}	1970–1971; 1976–1977; 1979–1981	Third baseman	.163 batting average; 1 home run; 22 runs batted in	

== Footnotes ==
Key

- ^{H} The National Baseball Hall of Fame and Museum determines which cap a player wears on their plaque, signifying "the team with which he made his most indelible mark". The Hall of Fame considers the player's wishes in making their decision, but the Hall makes the final decision as "it is important that the logo be emblematic of the historical accomplishments of that player's career".
- ^{P} Players are listed at a position if they appeared in 30% of their games or more during their Phillies career, as defined by Baseball-Reference.com. Additional positions may be shown on the Baseball-Reference website by following each player's citation.
- ^{R} Franchise batting and pitching leaders are drawn from Baseball-Reference.com. A total of 1,500 plate appearances are needed to qualify for batting records, and 500 innings pitched or 50 decisions are required to qualify for pitching records.
- ^{S} Statistics are correct as of the end of the 2010 Major League Baseball season.

Table

- ^{a} Turkey Tyson is listed by Baseball-Reference without a position; he never appeared in a game in the field in his major league career.
- ^{b} Fred Van Dusen is listed by Baseball-Reference without a position; he never appeared in a game in the field in his major league career.
