= List of Major League Baseball players with a .400 batting average in a season =

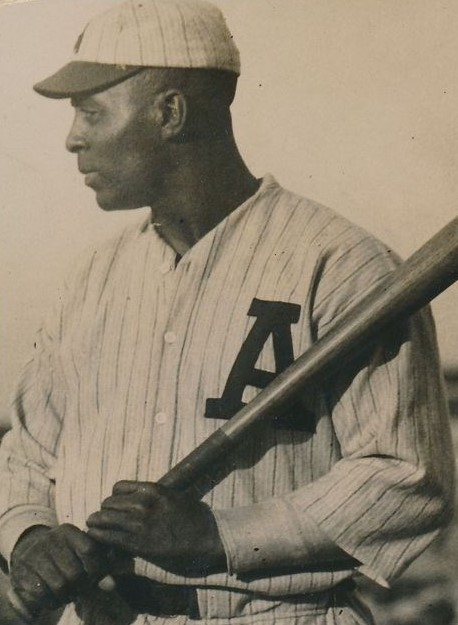
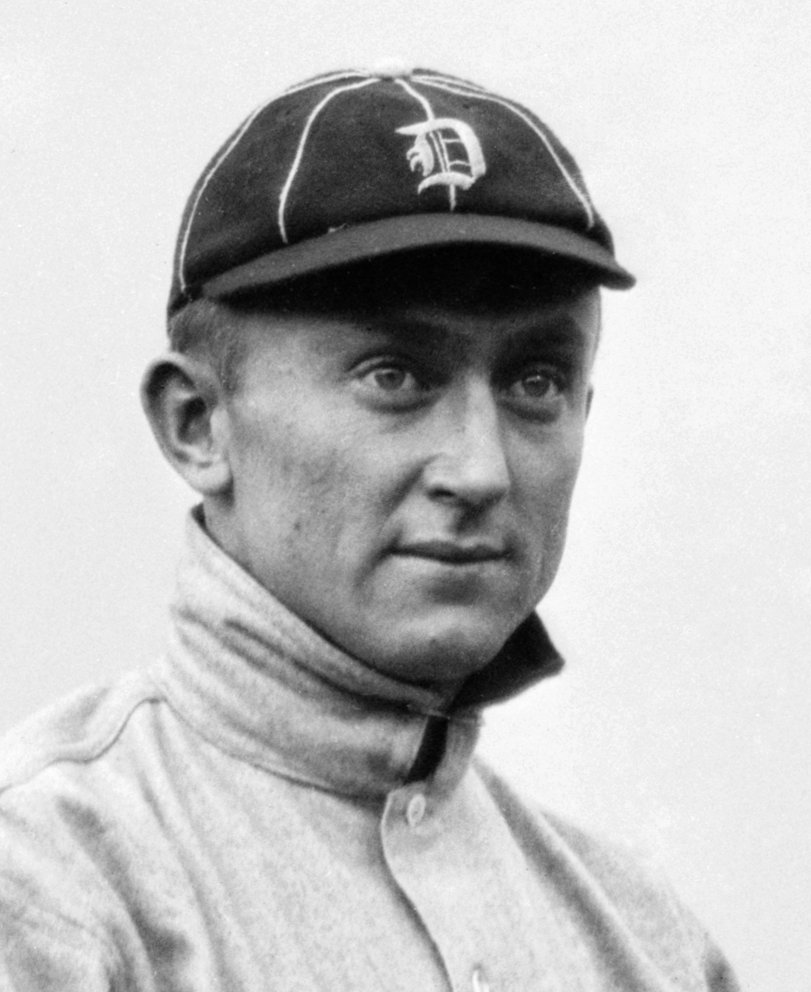
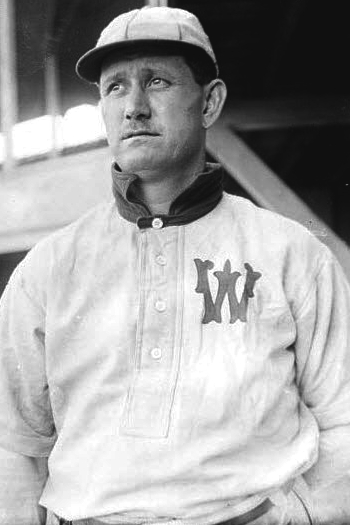
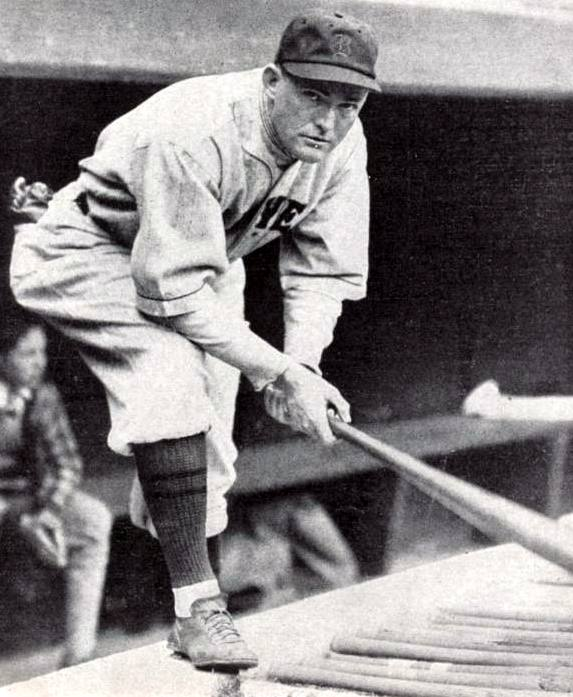
Oscar Charleston, Ty Cobb, Ed Delahanty, and Rogers Hornsby (left to right) are the only players to record a .400 batting average in three different seasons.

In baseball, batting average (AVG) is a measure of a batter's success rate in achieving a hit during an at bat, and is calculated by dividing a player's hits by his at bats. The achievement of a .400 batting average in a season was historically recognized as the coveted "standard of hitting excellence", in light of how batting .300 in a season is already regarded as very good. There have been 50 officially-recognized instances of a player having recorded a batting average of at least .400 in a single Major League Baseball (MLB) season. (Note: All officially-recognized seasons must meet MLB's standards for plate appearances in order to qualify.) In 1943, Josh Gibson of the Homestead Grays hit .466, the single-season record. In the National League, the last to do so was Bill Terry of the New York Giants in 1930. Ted Williams of the Boston Red Sox is the last player to hit .400 in the American League. Four players – Ed Delahanty, Ty Cobb, Rogers Hornsby and Oscar Charleston – have accomplished the feat in three different seasons.

In total, 48 players have reached the .400 mark in MLB history; eleven have done so more than once and five have done it three times. Ross Barnes is the only player to do it four times (1871, 1872, 1873, and 1876). Of the 48 players, 25 were right-handed batters, 21 were left-handed, and two were switch hitters, meaning they could bat from either side of the plate.

The Philadelphia Phillies are the only franchise to have three players reach the milestone in the same season (1894): Hall of Fame outfielders Ed Delahanty (.405), Billy Hamilton (.403), and Sam Thompson (.415), as well as outfielder Tuck Turner (.418). That same season, Boston Beaneaters outfielder Hugh Duffy batted .440 to win the batting title; to date, this is the only season in which five players throughout the Major Leagues had a .400 season. The Homestead Grays are the only franchise with four players recording a .400 single-season batting average, albeit in different years: Joe Strong (1932), Josh Gibson (1937, 1943), Buck Leonard (1938), and David Whatley (1939) all hit .400 while playing for the Grays. Three players won the Most Valuable Player (MVP) Award the same year as their .400 season: Ty Cobb (1911), George Sisler (1922), and Rogers Hornsby (1925). Rap Dixon, Tip O'Neill, Nap Lajoie, Josh Gibson (twice), Willie Wells, Mule Suttles, Oscar Charleston (twice), Heavy Johnson, and Rogers Hornsby (twice) also earned the Triple Crown in their .400 season. Shoeless Joe Jackson of the Cleveland Naps hit .408 in 1911, the highest batting average ever recorded by a rookie in the American League. Joe Strong has the lowest career batting average among players who have batted .400 in a season, with a .266, while Gibson recorded the highest career average in major league history, at .372.

Given the decades that have elapsed since Gibson became the last player to achieve the feat and the integral changes to the way the game of baseball is played since then – such as the increased utilization of specialized relief pitchers – a writer for The Washington Post called the mark "both mystical and unattainable". Consequently, modern-day attempts to reach the hallowed mark by Rod Carew (.388 in 1977), George Brett (.390 in 1980), and Tony Gwynn (.394 in the strike-shortened 1994 season) have generated considerable hype among fans and in the media. Of the thirty-six players who have batted .400 in a season, twenty-one have been elected to the Baseball Hall of Fame, two on the first ballot. Five of the thirty-six are ineligible for not meeting the 10-season threshold for enshrinement. Until he was reinstated in 2025, Shoeless Joe Jackson was ineligible for the Hall of Fame due to his ban for his involvement in the Black Sox Scandal, leaving eight eligible .400 hitters not elected to the Hall of Fame.

== Players ==
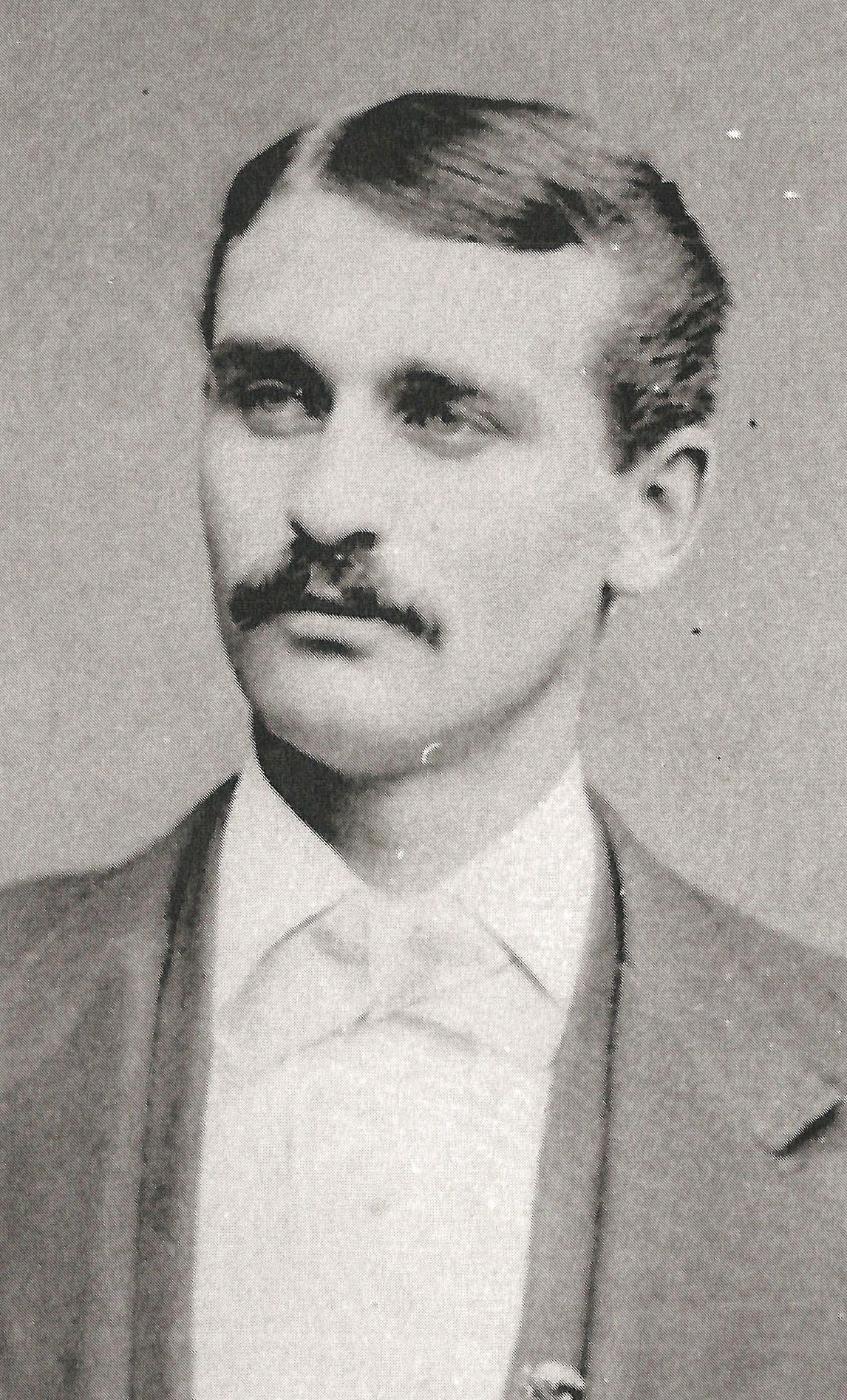
Ross Barnes batted .429 in 1876, the first season in major league history.

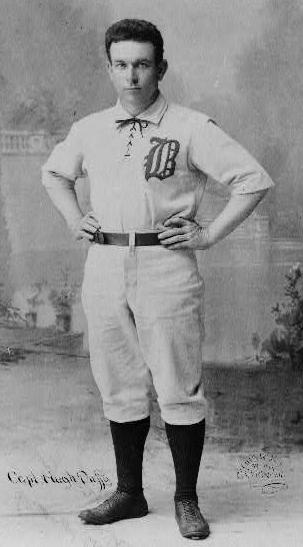
Hugh Duffy set a National League record in 1894 that has never been matched with a .440 batting average.

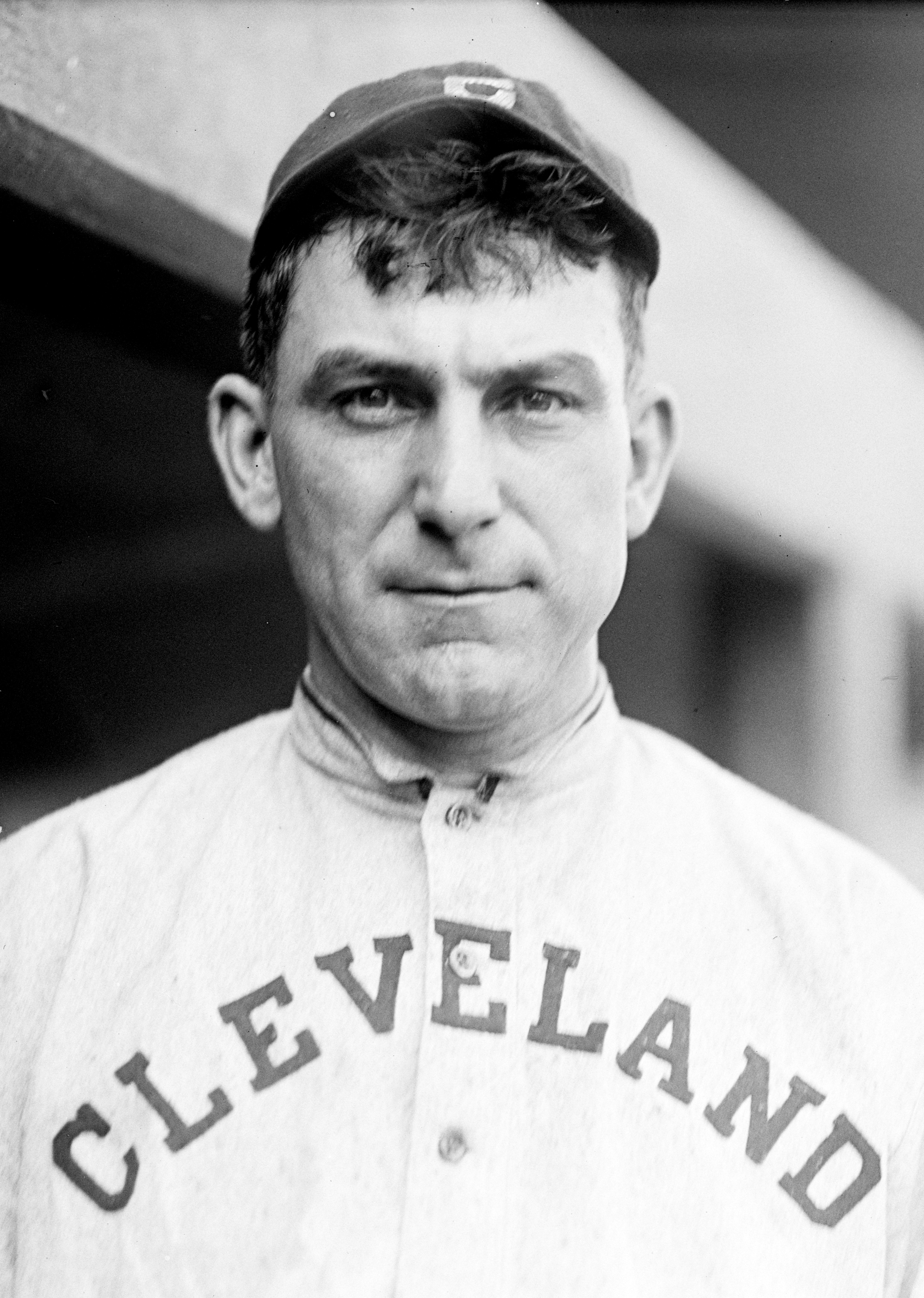
Nap Lajoie's .426 batting average in 1901 remains the highest in American League history.

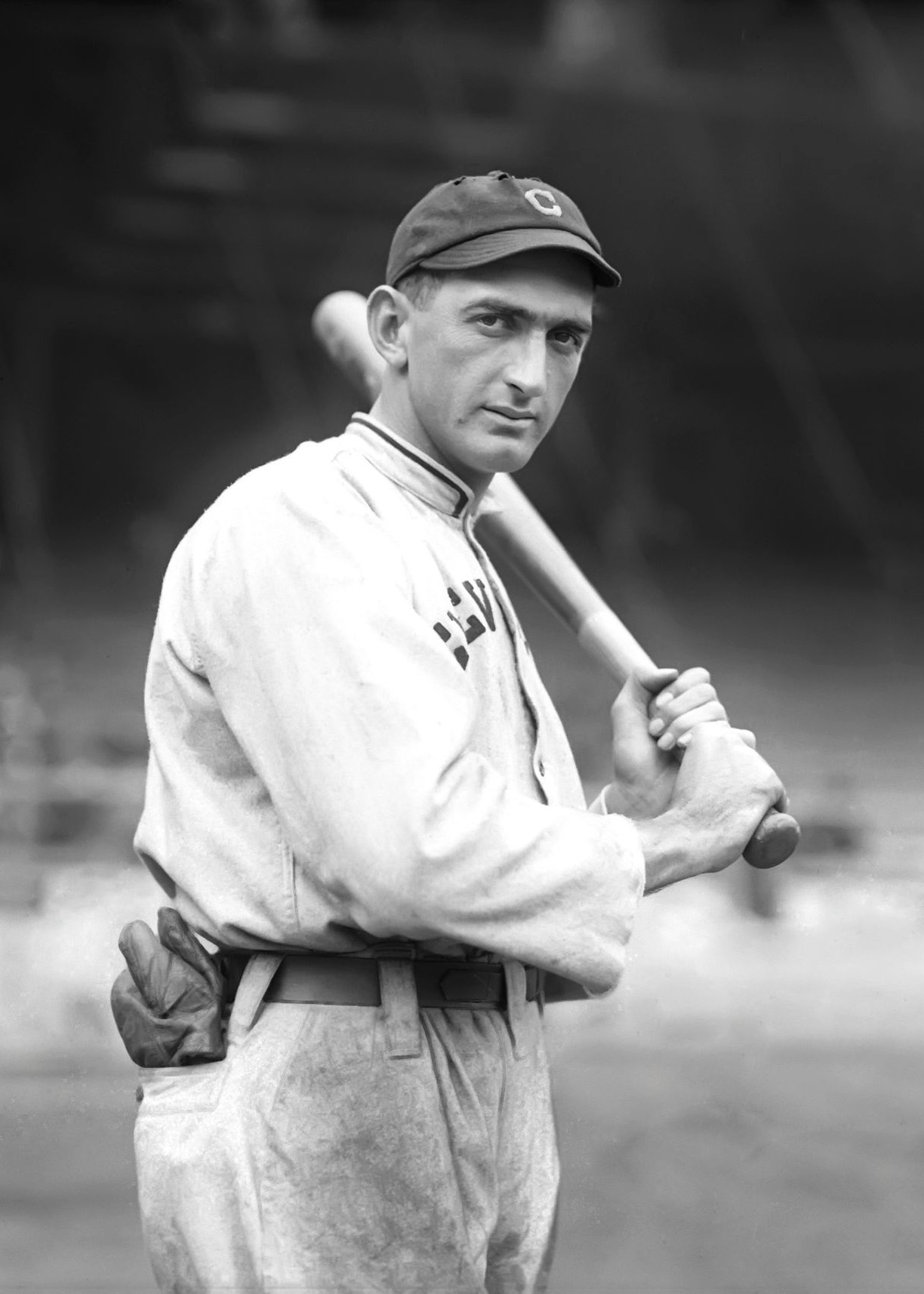
Shoeless Joe Jackson batted .408 in 1911, the highest mark ever set by a rookie in the American League.

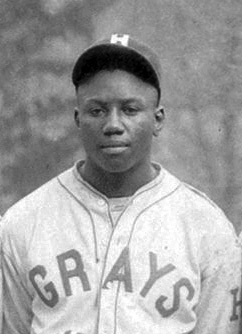
Josh Gibson is the most recent player to hit .400 in a season, batting a record .466 in 1943.

Key
Year	The year of the player's .400 season
Player (X)	Name of the player and number of .400 seasons they had at that point
Team	The player's team for his .400 season
NL	National League
AL	American League
AA	American Association
UA	Union Association
NN2	Negro National League
ANL	American Negro League
NAL	Negro American League
ECL	Eastern Colored League
EWL	East-West League
AVG	The player's batting average in that season (Note: Expressed to three significant figures.)
Career AVG	The player's batting average in his MLB career
§	Denotes batting average that was part of a Triple Crown season
†	Elected to the Baseball Hall of Fame

MLB players who have batted .400 in a season
Year	Player	Team	League	AVG	Career AVG	Ref
1876	Ross Barnes	Chicago White Stockings	NL	.429	.319	
1884	Fred Dunlap	St. Louis Maroons	UA	.412 (Note: The Union Association did not track RBI during its single-season existence. Dunlap led the league in both batting average and home runs.)	.292	
1887	Tip O'Neill	St. Louis Browns	AA	.435^{§}	.326	
1887	Pete Browning	Louisville Colonels	AA	.402	.341	
1894	Hugh Duffy^{†}	Boston Beaneaters	NL	.440	.326	
1894	Sam Thompson^{†}	Philadelphia Phillies	NL	.415	.331	
1894	Ed Delahanty^{†}	Philadelphia Phillies	NL	.405	.346	
1894	Billy Hamilton^{†}	Philadelphia Phillies	NL	.403	.344	
1895	Jesse Burkett^{†}	Cleveland Spiders	NL	.405	.338	
1895	Ed Delahanty^{†} (2)	Philadelphia Phillies	NL	.404	.346	
1896	Jesse Burkett^{†} (2)	Cleveland Spiders	NL	.410	.338	
1896	Hughie Jennings^{†}	Baltimore Orioles	NL	.401	.312	
1897	Willie Keeler^{†}	Baltimore Orioles	NL	.424	.341	
1899	Ed Delahanty^{†} (3)	Philadelphia Phillies	NL	.410	.346	
1901	Nap Lajoie^{†}	Philadelphia Athletics	AL	.426^{§}	.338	
1911	Ty Cobb^{†}	Detroit Tigers	AL	.419	.366	
1911	Shoeless Joe Jackson	Cleveland Naps	AL	.408	.356	
1912	Ty Cobb^{†} (2)	Detroit Tigers	AL	.409	.366	
1920	George Sisler^{†}	St. Louis Browns	AL	.407	.340	
1921	Charlie Blackwell	St. Louis Giants	NNL	.432	.326	
1921	Oscar Charleston^{†}	St. Louis Stars	NNL	.434	.363	
1922	Heavy Johnson	Kansas City Monarchs	NNL	.406	.370	
1922	George Sisler^{†} (2)	St. Louis Browns	AL	.420	.340	
1922	Rogers Hornsby^{†}	St. Louis Cardinals	NL	.401^{§}	.358	
1922	Ty Cobb^{†} (3)	Detroit Tigers	AL	.401	.366	
1923	Heavy Johnson (2)	Kansas City Monarchs	NNL	.406^{§}	.370	
1923	Biz Mackey^{†}	Hilldale Club	ECL	.423	.325	
1923	Harry Heilmann^{†}	Detroit Tigers	AL	.403	.342	
1924	Rogers Hornsby^{†} (2)	St. Louis Cardinals	NL	.424	.358	
1924	Oscar Charleston^{†} (2)	Harrisburg Giants	ECL	.405^{§}	.363	
1925	John Beckwith	Baltimore Black Sox	ECL	.404	.349	
1925	Oscar Charleston^{†} (3)	Harrisburg Giants	ECL	.427^{§}	.363	
1925	Rogers Hornsby^{†} (3)	St. Louis Cardinals	NL	.403^{§}	.358	
1925	Edgar Wesley	Detroit Stars	NNL	.404	.320	
1926	Mule Suttles^{†}	St. Louis Stars	NNL	.425^{§}	.339	
1927	Red Parnell	Birmingham Black Barons	NNL	.422	.331	
1927	Jud Wilson^{†}	Baltimore Black Sox / New York Lincoln Giants	ECL	.422	.350	
1928	Rap Dixon	Baltimore Black Sox	ECL	.401^{§}	.336	
1929	Rap Dixon (2)	Baltimore Black Sox	ANL	.415	.336	
1929	Chino Smith	New York Lincoln Giants	ANL	.451	.398	
1929	Jud Wilson^{†} (2)	Baltimore Black Sox	ANL	.404	.350	
1930	Willie Wells^{†}	St. Louis Stars	NNL	.413^{§}	.328	
1930	Bill Terry^{†}	New York Giants	NL	.401^{§}	.341	
1932	Joe Strong	Homestead Grays	EWL	.400	.266	
1937	Josh Gibson^{†}	Homestead Grays	NN2	.417^{§}	.372	
1938	Buck Leonard^{†}	Homestead Grays	NN2	.420	.345	
1939	Bill Hoskins	Baltimore Elite Giants	NN2	.408	.325	
1939	David Whatley	Cleveland Bears / Homestead Grays	ANL / NN2	.407	.334	
1941	Ted Williams^{†}	Boston Red Sox	AL	.406	.344	
1943	Josh Gibson^{†}(2)	Homestead Grays	NN2	.466^{§}	.372	
1944	Jesse Douglas	Chicago American Giants	NAL	.400	.290	
1948	Artie Wilson	Birmingham Black Barons	NAL	.433	.366	
1948	Willard Brown^{†}	Kansas City Monarchs	NAL	.408	.351	

== See also ==
- List of Major League Baseball batting champions
- List of Major League Baseball career batting average leaders
