= Erskine Thomason =

American baseball player (born 1948)

- Pitcher
- Born: August 13, 1948 (age 77); Laurens, South Carolina, U.S.
- Batted: Right Threw: Right

MLB debut
- September 18, 1974, for the Philadelphia Phillies

Last MLB appearance
- September 18, 1974, for the Philadelphia Phillies

MLB statistics
- Win–loss record: 0–0
- Earned run average: 0.00
- Strikeouts: 1
- Stats at Baseball Reference

Teams
- Philadelphia Phillies (1974)

Melvin Erskine Thomason (born August 13, 1948) is an American former professional baseball pitcher, whose baseball career spanned seven seasons, one September of which was spent with the Major League Baseball (MLB) Philadelphia Phillies. Thomason played in one MLB game, pitching an inning for the Phillies, on September 18, 1974. He struck out one batter while also recording two groundouts. During his playing days, Thomason stood 6 feet 1 inch (185 cm), weighing 190 pounds (86 kg).

Born and raised in South Carolina, Thomason first played professionally with the Pulaski Phillies in 1970. Over the next three seasons, he played for various Minor League Baseball (MiLB) teams in the Phillies organization before making his MLB debut in 1974. After playing another season in the minors, Thomason worked for the South Carolina Tax Commission, before eventually returning to pitch for the 1979 Reading Phillies. After retiring as an active player, he served as a minor league pitching coach, until his retirement in 1987.

== Early life ==
Melvin Erskine Thomason was born on August 13, 1948, in Laurens, South Carolina. His mother, Dorothy Cain Thomason, died in child birth, while his father, Furman Erskine Thomason, worked as a farmer. In 1966, Thomason graduated from Laurens High School, where he played football and basketball in addition to baseball. He attended college at Anderson College from 1968 until 1969, and attended Erskine College from 1969 until 1970, graduating with a bachelor's degree in physical education.

== Professional career ==
Thomason was drafted by the Phillies in the 22nd round (516th overall) of the 1970 MLB draft. After signing with the Phillies on June 10, 1970, he began his Minor League Baseball (MiLB) career with the Pulaski Phillies of the Appalachian League in 1970. Thomason also played for the Spartanburg Phillies, Peninsula Phillies, Burlington Rangers, Reading Phillies, and Toledo Mud Hens. His MiLB statistical totals included 54 wins and 47 losses (a win–loss percentage of .535). Thomason posted a 3.40 earned run average (ERA), allowing 443 runs scored, and 883 hits.

Thomason made his Major League debut on September 18, 1974, for the Philadelphia Phillies, in a game against the Chicago Cubs. He pitched in relief of Gene Garber in the top of the ninth inning, recording one strikeout against three batters faced, in a 5–2 Phillies loss.

Thomason was one of the players featured in the 1975 documentary Bush Leagues to Bright Lights. It chronicles his attempt to make the Phillies out of spring training, his demotion to the minor leagues, his subsequent struggles in Triple A, his tutoring by manager Jim Bunning, his marriage to his girlfriend, and ultimately his promotion to the major leagues. The film was narrated by John Facenda.

After retiring from playing baseball, Thomason served as the pitching coach for the Spartanburg Phillies (1980–1981). He currently lives in Laurens, South Carolina.

== See also ==
- Philadelphia Phillies all-time roster
