= List of Philadelphia Phillies team records =

The Philadelphia Phillies have participated in 142 seasons in Major League Baseball since their inception in 1883. They are the oldest continuous same-name, same-city franchise in all of American professional sports. Through September 29, 2024, they have played 21,648 games, winning 10,207 games and losing 11,326.

Since their 1883 inception, the team has made 15 playoff appearances, won eight National League pennants, and won two World Series championships (against the Kansas City Royals in 1980 and the Tampa Bay Rays in 2008).

Chuck Klein, the franchise's only batting Triple Crown winner, holds the most franchise records as of the end of the 2009 season, with eight, including career slugging percentage, career on-base plus slugging (OPS), and single-season extra-base hits. He is followed by Billy Hamilton, who holds seven records, including career batting average and the single-season runs record.

Several Phillies hold National League and major league records. Pitcher/outfielder John Coleman is the most decorated in this category, holding three major league records, all from the franchise's inaugural season. Coleman set records for losses, earned runs allowed, and hits allowed, all in 1883 when he also set three additional franchise pitching records. Shortstop Jimmy Rollins broke Willie Wilson's record for at-bats in a single season with 716 in 2007, and first baseman Ryan Howard also set the major league record for strikeouts in a single season that same year with 199, before it was broken by Mark Reynolds of the Arizona Diamondbacks the following year. The 1930 Phillies, who went 52–102, set two more National League records, allowing 1,993 hits and 1,193 runs in the regular season.

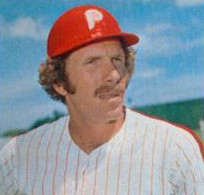
Mike Schmidt is the Phillies all-time leader in home runs and RBIs

== Individual career records ==
All statistics in this section are drawn from Baseball Reference using the following sources: batting statistics; pitching statistics.

Statistics are current through 2022 season.

RBI	Run(s) batted in
ERA	Earned run average^{[a]}
OPS	On-base percentage plus slugging percentage
*	Tie between two or more players/teams
†	National League record
§	Major League record

=== Career batting ===
Statistic	Player	Record	Phillies career	Ref
Batting average	Billy Hamilton	.360	1890–1895	
On-base percentage	Billy Hamilton	.468	1890–1895	
Slugging percentage	Chuck Klein	.553	1928–1933, 1936–1939, 1940–1944	
OPS	Chuck Klein	.935	1928–1933, 1936–1939, 1940–1944	
Hits	Jimmy Rollins	2,306	2000–2014	
Total bases	Mike Schmidt	4,404	1972–1989	
Singles	Richie Ashburn	1,811	1948–1959	
Doubles	Jimmy Rollins	479	2000–2014	
Triples	Ed Delahanty	158	1888–1889; 1891–1901	
Home runs	Mike Schmidt	548	1972–1989	
RBI	Mike Schmidt	1,595	1972–1989	
Bases on balls	Mike Schmidt	1,507	1972–1989	
Strikeouts	Mike Schmidt	1,883	1972–1989	
Stolen bases	Billy Hamilton	510	1890–1895	

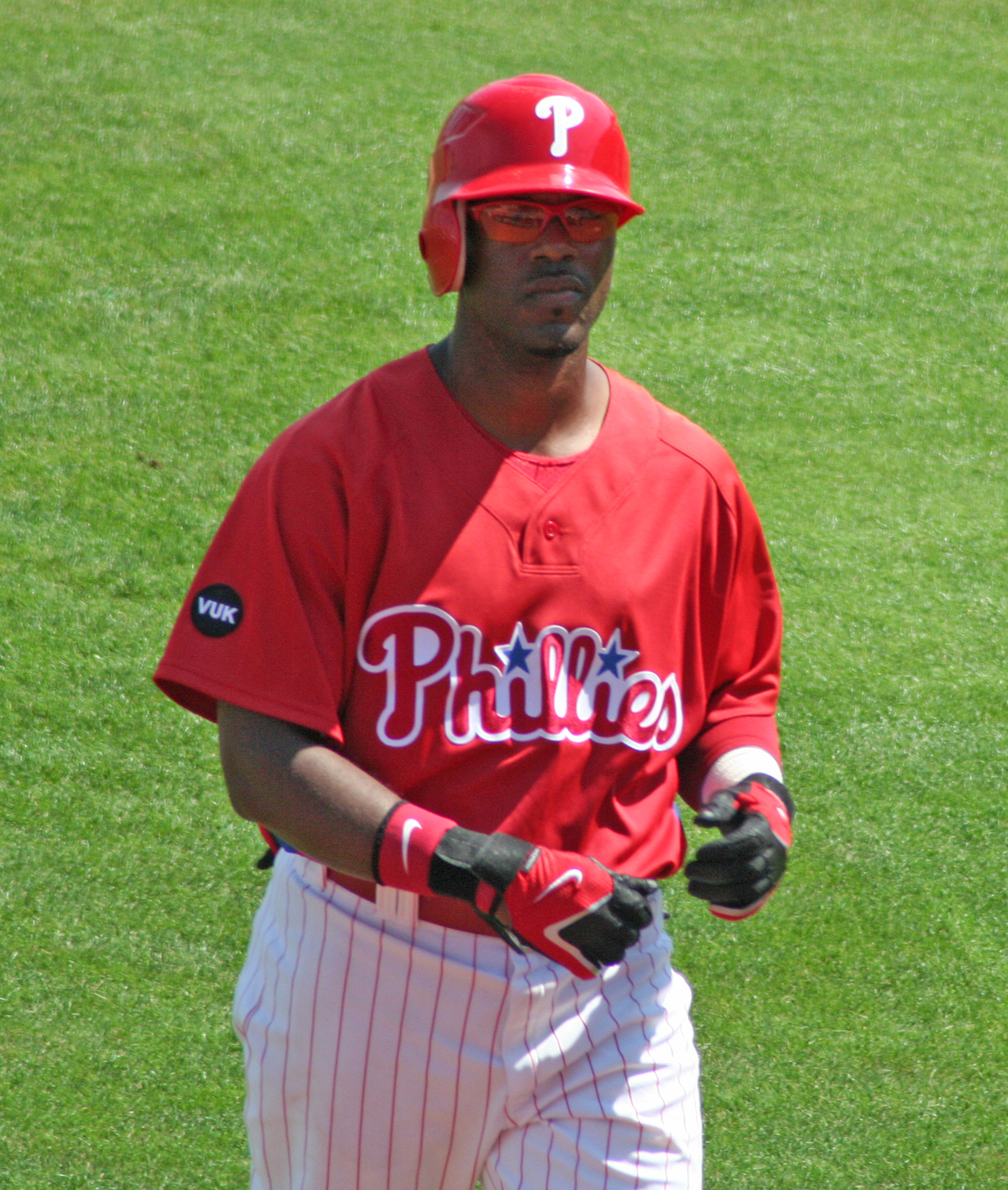
Jimmy Rollins is the Phillies all-time leader in hits.

=== Career pitching ===
Statistic	Player	Record	Phillies career	Ref
Wins	Steve Carlton	241	1972–1986	
Losses	Robin Roberts	199	1948–1961	
Win–loss percentage	Grover Cleveland Alexander	.676	1911–1917, 1930	
ERA	George McQuillan	1.79	1907–1911; 1915–1916	
Saves	Jonathan Papelbon	123	2012–2015	
Strikeouts	Steve Carlton	3,031	1972–1986	
Shutouts	Grover Cleveland Alexander	61	1911–1917, 1930	
Games	Robin Roberts	529	1948–1961	
Innings	Robin Roberts	3,739 1/3	1948–1961	
Games started	Steve Carlton	499	1972–1986	
Complete games	Robin Roberts	272	1948–1961	
Walks	Steve Carlton	1,252	1972–1986	
Hits allowed	Robin Roberts	3,661	1948–1961	
Wild pitches	Steve Carlton	120	1972–1986	
Hit batsmen	Jack Taylor	90	1892–1897	

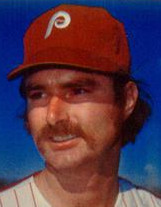
Steve Carlton holds several records with the team, including most wins and strikeouts.

== Individual single-season records ==
All statistics in this section are drawn from Baseball Reference using the following sources: batting statistics; pitching statistics.

=== Single-season batting ===
Statistic	Player	Record	Season	Ref
Batting average	Sam Thompson	.415	1894	
Home runs	Ryan Howard	58	2006	
RBI	Chuck Klein	170^{†}	1930	
Runs	Billy Hamilton	198^{§}	1894	
Hits	Lefty O'Doul	254	1929	
Singles	Richie Ashburn	181*	1951	
Singles	Lefty O'Doul	181*	1929	
Singles	Billy Hamilton	181*	1894	
Doubles	Chuck Klein	59	1930	
Triples	Sam Thompson	28	1894	
Stolen bases	Billy Hamilton	111	1891	
At bats	Jimmy Rollins	716^{§}	2007	
Hitting streak	Jimmy Rollins	36 games^{[b]}	2005	
Slugging percentage	Sam Thompson	.687	1894	
Extra-base hits	Chuck Klein	107^{†}	1930	
Total bases	Chuck Klein	445	1930	
On-base percentage	Billy Hamilton	.521	1894	
OPS	Sam Thompson	1.162	1894	
Walks	Lenny Dykstra	129	1993	
Strikeouts	Kyle Schwarber	215	2023	

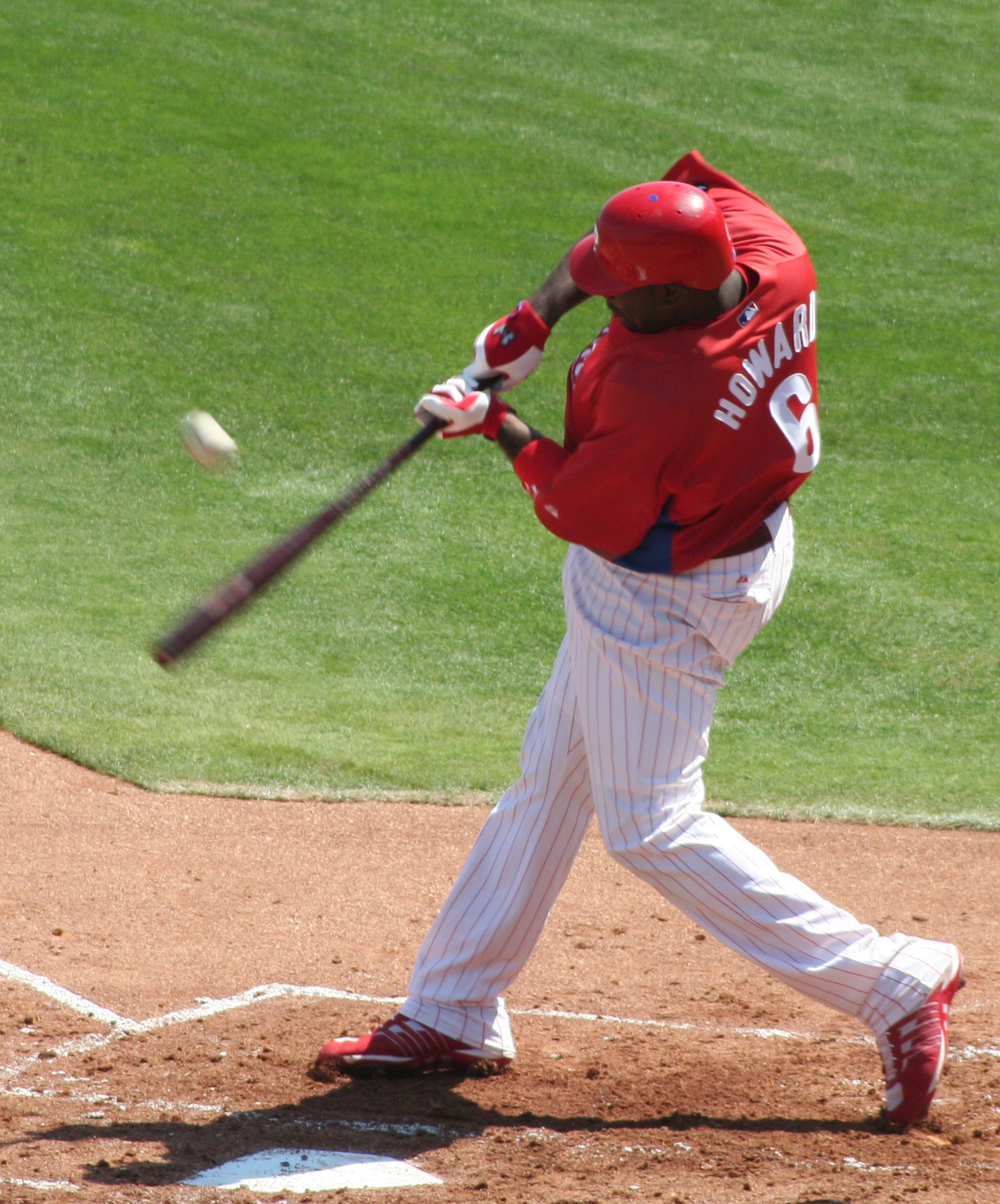
Ryan Howard holds the franchise record of most home runs in a single season.

=== Single-season pitching ===
Statistic	Player	Record	Season	Ref
Wins	Kid Gleason	38	1890	
Losses	John Coleman	48^{§}	1883	
Strikeouts	Curt Schilling	319	1997	
ERA	Grover Cleveland Alexander	1.22	1915	
Earned runs allowed	John Coleman	291^{§}	1883	
Hits allowed	John Coleman	772^{§}	1883	
Shutouts	Grover Cleveland Alexander	16^{§}	1916	
Saves	José Mesa	45	2002	
Games	Kent Tekulve	90	1987	
Starts	John Coleman	61	1883	
Complete games	John Coleman	59	1883	
Innings	John Coleman	583 1/3	1883	

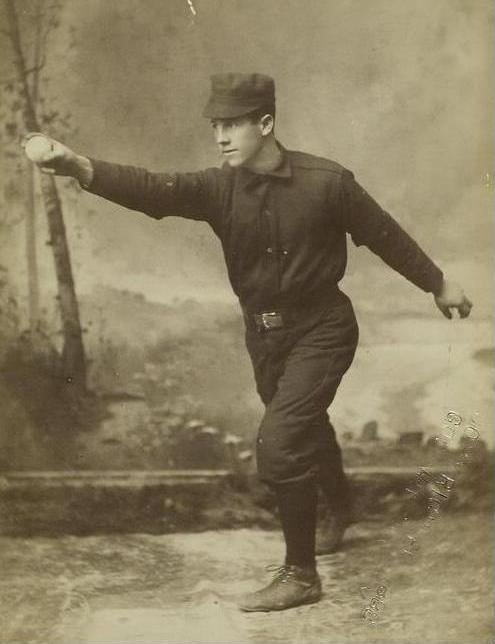
Kid Gleason holds the franchise record for most Wins in a single season

== Team single-game records ==
All statistics in this section are drawn from the following source.

=== Single-game batting ===
Statistic	Record	Date
Home runs hit	8	September 24, 2025
Runs scored	26	June 11, 1985
Hits	27	June 11, 1985
Doubles	?	Unknown
Triples	?	Unknown
Total bases	45	June 11, 1985
Runners left on base	20*	September 4, 1922
Runners left on base	20*	August 14, 1990
Strikeouts	19	October 6, 1991
Stolen bases	11*	July 12, 1906
Stolen bases	11*	August 31, 1906

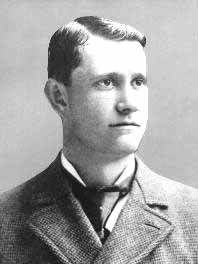
Ed Delahanty is the Phillies all-time leader in triples and has the highest single season batting average with the team

=== Single-game pitching ===
Statistic	Record	Date
Hits allowed	30	September 2, 1935
Runs allowed	28	July 6, 1929
Home runs allowed	9	September 4, 1999
Strikeouts	17*	April 23, 1961
Strikeouts	17*	July 21, 1997

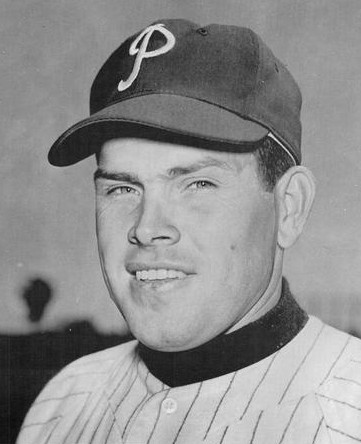
Robin Roberts pitched in 529 games for the Phillies. The most in franchise history.

== Team season records ==
All statistics in this section are drawn from the following source.

=== Season batting ===
Statistic	Record	Season
Home runs	224	2009
Runs	1,179	1894
Hits	1,783	1930
Doubles	345	1930
Triples	137	1894
Total bases	2,594	1930
Runners left on base	1,281	1993
Strikeouts	1,520	2008
Stolen bases	355	1887

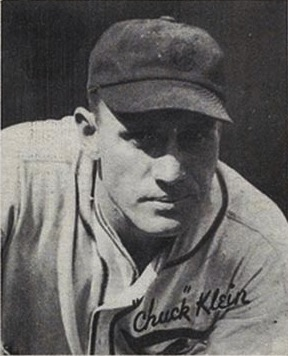
Chuck Klein holds several single season batting records with the Phillies

=== Season pitching ===
Statistic	Record	Season
Hits allowed	1,993^{†}	1930
Runs allowed	1,199^{†}	1930
Home runs allowed	258	2019
Strikeouts	1,480	2021
Shutouts	25	1916

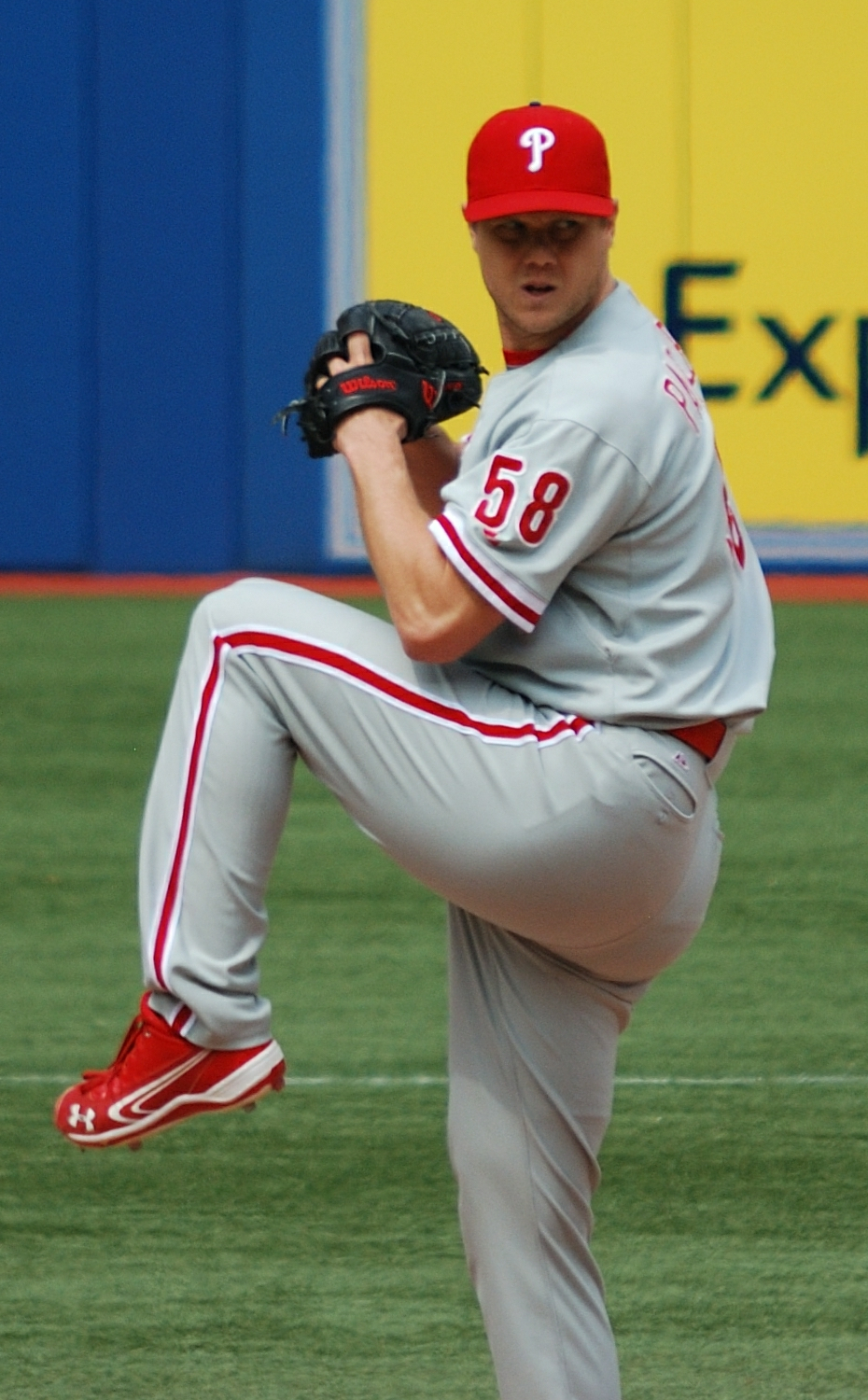
Jonathan Papelbon is the Phillies all-time leader in saves.

== Notes ==
- ^{a} Earned run average is calculated as 9 × (ER ÷ IP), where $ER$ is earned runs and $IP$ is innings pitched.
- ^{b} Jimmy Rollins hit in 36 straight games up to and including the final game of 2005. Hitting streak in one season and hitting streak over two seasons are considered two separate records by Major League Baseball. After tallying hits in the first two games of 2006, Rollins' streak officially ended at 38 over two seasons.

== See also ==
- Baseball statistics
- Philadelphia Phillies award winners and league leaders
