= Billy Hamilton (baseball, born 1866) =

American baseball player (1866–1940)

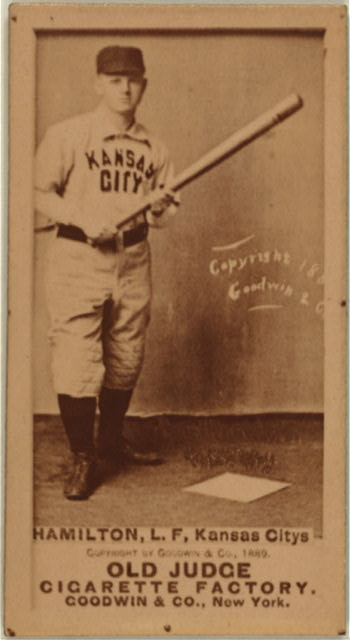
- Hamilton in 1887
- Outfielder
- Born: February 16, 1866; Newark, New Jersey, U.S.
- Died: December 15, 1940 (aged 74); Worcester, Massachusetts, U.S.
- Batted: Left Threw: Right

MLB debut
- July 31, 1888, for the Kansas City Cowboys

Last MLB appearance
- September 16, 1901, for the Boston Beaneaters

MLB statistics
- Batting average: .344
- Hits: 2,164
- Home runs: 40
- Runs batted in: 742
- Stolen bases: 914
- Stats at Baseball Reference

Teams
- Kansas City Cowboys (1888–1889); Philadelphia Phillies (1890–1895); Boston Beaneaters (1896–1901)

Career highlights and awards
- 2× NL batting champion (1891, 1893); 5× NL stolen base leader (1889–1891, 1894, 1895); MLB record 198 runs, single season; Philadelphia Phillies jersey retired; Philadelphia Phillies Wall of Fame

Member of the National

Baseball Hall of Fame
- Induction: 1961
- Election method: Veterans Committee

William Robert Hamilton (February 16, 1866 – December 15, 1940), nicknamed "Sliding Billy", was an American professional baseball player in Major League Baseball (MLB) during the 19th century. He played for the Kansas City Cowboys, Philadelphia Phillies and Boston Beaneaters between 1888 and 1901.

Hamilton won the National League (NL) batting title twice and led the NL in stolen bases five times, eclipsing 100 on four occasions. He hit over .400 in 1894 and set the major league record for runs scored in a season with 198. His 914^{[a]} stolen bases ranks third all time behind only Rickey Henderson, at 1,406 and Lou Brock with 938.

A career .344 hitter, he was elected to the National Baseball Hall of Fame in the Class of 1961 via the Veterans Committee.

== Early life ==
Hamilton was born on February 16, 1866^{[b]} in Newark, New Jersey. His parents, Samuel and Mary Hamilton, had emigrated to New Jersey from Ireland. According to biographer Roy Kerr, there is evidence to suggest Hamilton was descended from Ulster Scots. (As an adult, Hamilton was known to proudly proclaim his Scottish ancestry.) When Hamilton was a small child, his family moved to Clinton, Massachusetts. He worked in a Clinton cotton mill as a young teenager.

== Professional career ==
Hamilton broke into the major leagues in the American Association with the Kansas City Cowboys in 1888. He established himself as a star the following season by batting .301 with 144 runs and 111 stolen bases. In 1890, the Cowboys, who were ceasing operations, sold Hamilton to the Philadelphia Phillies. The next year he led the NL in batting average (.340), runs scored (141) and hits (179). For a third consecutive season, Hamilton led the NL in stolen bases.

In 1892, Hamilton hit both a leadoff and game-ending home run in the same game. Vic Power (1957), Darin Erstad (2000), Reed Johnson (2003) and Ian Kinsler (2009) have also accomplished the same feat. He hit .380 in 1893, which led the major leagues.

Philadelphia outfielders Hamilton, Sam Thompson, Ed Delahanty and Tuck Turner all hit over .400 in 1894. That year Hamilton set the all-time standard for most runs scored in a season (198); since then, Babe Ruth has come closest to Hamilton in runs scored, with 177 in 1921, setting the American League and modern MLB record. Hamilton also set the record for most stolen bases in one game, with seven on August 31, 1894. He set the record for most consecutive games scoring one or more runs, with 35 runs in 24 games in July–August 1894.

Hamilton led the league in steals for a fifth time in 1895. In 1896, Hamilton moved to Boston, for whom he played his final six seasons. Although his numbers declined, Hamilton still scored over 100 runs in all but two of those seasons.

Hamilton retired after the 1901 season. Over his career he compiled 914 (or 937; see this article's "legacy" section) stolen bases, a .344 batting average and 1690 runs in 1591 games; he is one of only three players to average more than a run per game played. His .455 career on-base percentage ranks fourth all-time behind Ted Williams, Babe Ruth and John McGraw.

He is the Philadelphia Phillies career leader in batting average (.361), on-base percentage (.468) and stolen bases (508). He holds Phillies single-season records for on-base percentage (.523 in 1894), runs (196 in 1894), stolen bases (111 in 1891) and times on base (355 in 1894).

== Legacy ==
Though stolen bases were credited differently during Hamilton's career than they are in modern times, he was very proud of his stolen base marks. In 1937, Hamilton lambasted the Sporting News in a letter he wrote to them, stating, "I was and will be the greatest base stealer of all time. I stole over 100 bases on many years and if they ever re-count the record I will get my just reward."

== Later life ==
After his playing days ended, Hamilton managed several minor league teams in Pennsylvania and Massachusetts and served as a scout with the Boston Nationals.

Hamilton died on December 15, 1940, at his home at 6 Lucian Street in Worcester, Massachusetts. He was survived by his wife Rebecca (Carr) Hamilton, four daughters and two grandchildren. He was inducted into the Baseball Hall of Fame in 1961.

== See also ==
- List of Major League Baseball career hits leaders
- List of Major League Baseball career runs scored leaders
- List of Major League Baseball batting champions
- List of Major League Baseball stolen base records
- List of Major League Baseball career stolen bases leaders
- List of Major League Baseball annual runs scored leaders
- List of Major League Baseball annual stolen base leaders
- List of Philadelphia Phillies team records

== Notes ==
- ^{a} His career steals total differs, based on the source. Hamilton's plaque in the Baseball Hall of Fame credits him with 937 steals, though the article on the HOF website notes that the total has been adjusted to 914 based on additional research, while MLB.com credits him with 912 steals and Baseball Reference.com credits him with 914 steals.
- ^{b} While most sources list this date of birth, biographer Roy Kerr writes that Newark archives suggest a date of birth of February 15, 1866.
