= Tuck Turner =

American baseball player (1867–1945)

- Outfielder
- Born: February 13, 1867; New Brighton, New York, U.S.
- Died: July 16, 1945 (aged 72); Staten Island, New York, U.S.
- Batted: Both Threw: Left

MLB debut
- August 18, 1893, for the Philadelphia Phillies

Last MLB appearance
- June 10, 1898, for the St. Louis Browns

MLB statistics
- Batting average: .320
- Home runs: 7
- Runs batted in: 215
- Stats at Baseball Reference

Teams
- Philadelphia Phillies (1893–1896); St. Louis Browns (1896–1898)

George A. Turner (February 13, 1867 – July 16, 1945) was an American Major League Baseball player for the Philadelphia Phillies and St. Louis Browns.

== Career ==
Born in West New Brighton, Staten Island, Turner began his baseball career as a paid player in the Buffalo Amateur Baseball League of the Amateur Athletic Union. "Tuck" broke into the National League with the Philadelphia Phillies in 1893 at the age of 26, but as was a common practice in baseball at the time, Turner lied about his age, claiming to be only 20. In 1894, Turner was part of one of the greatest outfields in baseball history; Turner, Billy Hamilton, Sam Thompson, and Ed Delahanty all batted over .400 on the year. Turner, with a .418 batting average, finished second in the league that season to Hugh Duffy, who also happened to set the single-season batting average record of .440. The Phillies were unable to win the pennant, however, as the late 1890s were the peak of the powerful Original Baltimore Orioles and Boston Beaneaters.

Turner had another great season in 1895, leading the league with a .411 batting average through August. By the tail end of 1895 and the beginning of 1896, Turner had lost his batting touch and was traded to St. Louis for Duff Cooley. According to accounts in the defunct sports journal The Sporting Life, Turner had contracted malaria, suffering recurrent attacks in 1897 and 1898.

On October 3, 1897, while playing for St. Louis, Turner accomplished a rare feat by hitting an inside-the-park grand slam. Turner's .418 batting average in 1894 is ninth all-time in single-season batting average and also the highest in a single season for a switch hitter.

From 1899 to 1901, Turner played with the Hartford Indians in the Eastern League, replacing the legendary Louis Sockalexis in the field his first season. Turner's post-majors career also included stops in the Western League, Connecticut League and New England League.

Turner was inducted into the Staten Island Sports Hall of Fame in 2011. His award was accepted by his grandson Richard Turner.

== See also ==
- List of Major League Baseball players with a .400 batting average in a season
- Early 20th century Cleveland ballplayer Terry Turner (who frequently went by the nickname "Tuck")
