= John Coleman (baseball, born 1863) =

American baseball player (1863–1922)

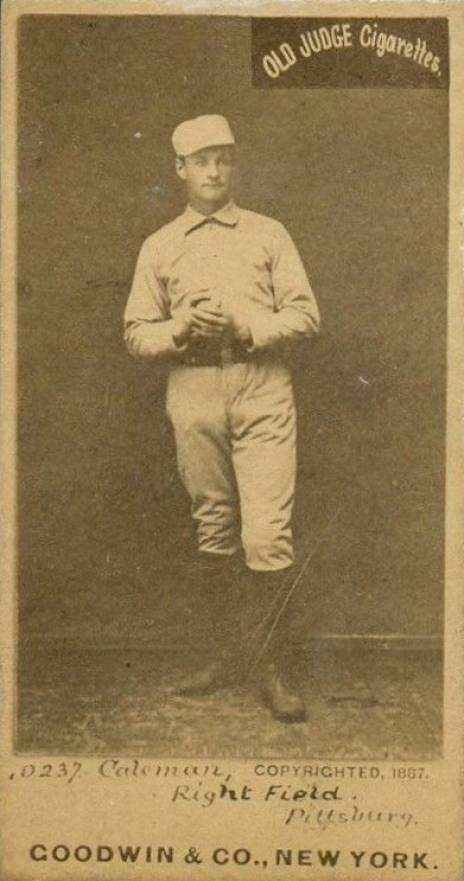
- 1887 baseball card of Coleman
- Outfielder / Pitcher
- Born: March 6, 1863; Saratoga Springs, New York, U.S.
- Died: May 8, 1922 (aged 59); Detroit, Michigan, U.S.
- Batted: Left Threw: Right

MLB debut
- May 1, 1883, for the Philadelphia Quakers

Last MLB appearance
- July 18, 1890, for the Pittsburgh Alleghenys

MLB statistics
- Batting average: .257
- Home runs: 7
- Runs batted in: 279
- Win–loss record: 23–72
- Earned run average: 4.68
- Strikeouts: 224
- Stats at Baseball Reference

Teams
- Philadelphia Quakers (1883–1884); Philadelphia Athletics (1884–1886); Pittsburgh Alleghenys (1886–1888); Philadelphia Athletics (1889); Pittsburgh Alleghenys (1890)

John Francis Coleman (March 6, 1863 – May 31, 1922) was an American professional baseball outfielder and pitcher. He played in Major League Baseball (MLB) for the Philadelphia Quakers, Philadelphia Athletics, and Pittsburgh Alleghenys from 1883 to 1890. Coleman holds the MLB single-season record for pitching losses, with 48, and earned runs allowed, with 291, both in his rookie season.

== 1883 season ==
Coleman was born in 1863, and he started his professional baseball career with the Philadelphia Quakers of the National League in 1883. It was the first year of the franchise later known as the Philadelphia Phillies.

The Phillies played their first game of all time on April 2, 1883, when they defeated the amateur Manayunk Ashlands in an exhibition game by the score of 11–0 at Recreation Park. Coleman was the winning pitcher for Philadelphia.

In the first game of the season on May 1, Coleman and the Quakers lost to Charles Radbourn and the Providence Grays, 4–3. As the Quakers were short on usable pitchers, Coleman pitched most of the team's games that season. They were also a poor team offensively, with a league-worst .240 batting average, and defensively. The Quakers finished the season with a record of 17–81, last in the NL. Coleman started 61 games, completing 59 of them. He pitched 65 games and 538.1 innings overall and had a 12–48 win–loss record, a 4.87 earned run average, and 159 strikeouts. He led the league with 48 losses, 772 hits allowed, 291 earned runs allowed, and 17 home runs allowed, and he was third in innings pitched. His 48 losses, 772 hits allowed, and 291 earned runs allowed over that 98-game season are all single-season MLB records that have never been matched or broken. No other pitcher has lost more than 42 games in a season. Coleman's difference between wins and losses, 36, is also the largest ever. In addition to his MLB records, he also holds Phillies franchise records in games started, complete games, and innings pitched in a single season for his performance in 1883. Coleman also played 31 games as an outfielder. He finished the season with a .234 batting average.

== Later MLB career ==
Early the following season, Coleman split his time as a pitcher and outfielder, as the Quakers had another pitcher, Charlie Ferguson. Coleman started suffering from arm problems, possibly from overuse, and his 1883 season would comprise the majority of innings pitched in his MLB career. In 1884, he started the season 5–15 before the Quakers released him in August. Later that month, Coleman signed with the Philadelphia Athletics of the American Association. He mostly played in the outfield for the Athletics, fielding poorly, and went 0–2 as a pitcher. At the plate, he had an overall batting average of .230 for the season.

In 1885, Coleman, playing mostly as an outfielder, appeared in 96 games. He batted a career-high .299 and finished eighth in the league in batting average. His fielding also improved. He went 2–2 as a pitcher.

By 1886, Coleman was a full-time outfielder. He played mostly for the Athletics before joining the American Association's Pittsburgh Alleghenys late in the season. The Alleghenys were the team later known as the Pittsburgh Pirates. Coleman batted .254 that year.

The Alleghenys moved to the National League in 1887. Coleman batted .293.

In 1888, Coleman's batting average fell to .231.

Coleman was out of professional baseball in early 1889. He rejoined the Philadelphia Athletics in May. Returning to the pitcher's mound, he went 3–2 before the Athletics released him in September.

Coleman started the 1890 season with the Toronto Canucks of the minor league International Association. Playing as an outfielder and pitcher, he batted .280 and had an 11–3 record in 49 games played. Coleman then rejoined the Pittsburgh Alleghenys. He played three games for the Alleghenys and went 0–2. That was his last season in the major leagues.

Coleman finished his MLB career with a .257 batting average, 7 home runs, 279 runs batted in, a 23–72 win–loss record, a 4.68 ERA, and 224 strikeouts.

== Later life ==
Coleman played baseball for various minor league teams in 1891, 1892, 1893, and 1897. Most of his time was spent as an outfielder, pitcher, and first baseman. In 1893, as a pitcher for the Pennsylvania State League's York White Roses, Coleman played 37 games and had 332.2 innings pitched, a 23–12 record, a 2.57 ERA, 37 strikeouts, and a .285 batting average. The 23 wins were his career-high in professional baseball.

In 1922, Coleman died after being hit by a motorist. In 2007, the Philadelphia Phillies became the first sports team of any kind to reach 10,000 losses.
