= Joe Strong (Negro leagues pitcher) =

American baseball player (1902–1986)

- Pitcher
- Born: August 4, 1902; Jackson, Kentucky, U.S.
- Died: November 12, 1986 (aged 84); Middletown, Ohio, U.S.
- Batted: Left Threw: Right

Teams
- Cleveland Tate Stars (1922); Milwaukee Bears (1923); Chicago American Giants (1923); Baltimore Black Sox (1924–1928); Hilldale Club (1928–1929); Homestead Grays (1929, 1932–1937); St. Louis Stars (1930); Pittsburgh Crawfords (1937)

Career highlights and awards
- American Negro League ERA leader (1929); East–West League ERA leader (1932)

Joseph Talton Strong (August 4, 1902 – November 12, 1986) was an American Negro league baseball pitcher, playing for several teams. Most of his seasons, he played for the Baltimore Black Sox, and the Homestead Grays.

Strong attended college at Wilberforce University in Wilberforce, Ohio.

He died in Middletown, Ohio when he was 84.
