= 1947 New York Yankees season =

Season for the Major League Baseball team the New York Yankees

1947 New York Yankees
- World Series champions American League champions
- League: American League
- Ballpark: Yankee Stadium
- City: New York City
- Record: 97–57 (.630)
- League place: 1st
- Owners: Larry MacPhail, Dan Topping and Del Webb
- General managers: Larry MacPhail
- Managers: Bucky Harris
- Television: WABD
- Radio: WINS (AM) (Mel Allen, Russ Hodges)

The 1947 New York Yankees season was the team's 45th season. The team finished with a record of 97–57, winning their 15th pennant, finishing 12 games ahead of the Detroit Tigers. New York was managed by Bucky Harris. The Yankees played their home games at Yankee Stadium. In the World Series, they defeated the Brooklyn Dodgers in 7 games. It was the first ever season of the Yankees to be broadcast live on television with WABD providing the television broadcast feed to viewers in the city.

== Regular season ==
Led by American League Most Valuable Player Joe DiMaggio, the 1947 Yankees won the AL pennant by 12 games over the Detroit Tigers. They then defeated the Brooklyn Dodgers in seven games in the World Series. Notable plays included Cookie Lavagetto's walk-off double in Game 4 and Al Gionfriddo's catch of a drive by DiMaggio that might otherwise have been a home run.

=== Season standings ===
American League
Team	W	L	Pct.	GB	Home	Road
New York Yankees	97	57	.630	—	55‍–‍22	42‍–‍35
Detroit Tigers	85	69	.552	12	46‍–‍31	39‍–‍38
Boston Red Sox	83	71	.539	14	49‍–‍30	34‍–‍41
Cleveland Indians	80	74	.519	17	38‍–‍39	42‍–‍35
Philadelphia Athletics	78	76	.506	19	39‍–‍38	39‍–‍38
Chicago White Sox	70	84	.455	27	32‍–‍43	38‍–‍41
Washington Senators	64	90	.416	33	36‍–‍41	28‍–‍49
St. Louis Browns	59	95	.383	38	29‍–‍48	30‍–‍47

=== Record vs. opponents ===
1947 American League record Sources:
Team	BOS	CWS	CLE	DET	NYY	PHA	SLB	WSH
Boston	—	16–6–1	9–13	12–10–1	9–13	10–12–1	15–7	12–10
Chicago	6–16–1	—	11–11	7–15	10–12	11–11	11–11	14–8
Cleveland	13–9	11–11	—	8–14–2	7–15	11–11–1	17–5	13–9
Detroit	10–12–1	15–7	14–8–2	—	8–14–1	11–11	15–7	12–10
New York	13–9	12–10	15–7	14–8–1	—	13–9	15–7	15–7
Philadelphia	12–10–1	11–11	11–11–1	11–11	9–13	—	13–9	11–11
St. Louis	7–15	11–11	5–17	7–15	7–15	9–13	—	13–9
Washington	10–12	8–14	9–13	10–12	7–15	11–11	9–13	—

=== Roster ===
1947 New York Yankees
Roster
Pitchers: 14 Rugger Ardizoia; 16 Bill Bevens; 28 Tommy Byrne; 21 Spud Chandler; 19 Karl Drews; 18 Randy Gumpert; 26 Don Johnson; 36 Al Lyons; 34 Bobo Newsom; 11 Joe Page; 17 Mel Queen; 17 Vic Raschi; 22 Allie Reynolds; 20 Spec Shea; 30 Dick Starr; 25,42 Butch Wensloff; 28 Bill Wight	Catchers: 35 Yogi Berra; 32 Ralph Houk; 29 Sherm Lollar; 8 Aaron Robinson; 34 Ken Silvestri; Infielders: 6 Bobby Brown; 2 Frankie Crosetti; 14 Lonny Frey; 24 Billy Johnson; 29,52 Johnny Lucadello; 9 George McQuinn; 36 Jack Phillips; 10 Phil Rizzuto; 1 Snuffy Stirnweiss	Outfielders: 3 Allie Clark; 3,48 Frank Colman; 5 Joe DiMaggio; 15 Tommy Henrich; 12 Charlie Keller; 27 Johnny Lindell; Other batters: 25 Ray Mack; 14 Ted Sepkowski	Manager: 37 Bucky Harris; Coaches: 31 Red Corriden; 2 Frankie Crosetti; 7 Chuck Dressen; 33 Johnny Schulte

== Postseason ==
=== Game log ===
Legend
	Yankees win
	Yankees loss
**Bold**	Yankees team member

1947 Postseason Game Log: 4–3 (Home: 3–1; Away: 1–2)
World Series: 4–3 (Home: 3–1; Away: 1–2)

#	Date	Opponent	Score	Win	Loss	Save	Attendance	Record	Streak
1	September 30	Dodgers	5–3	**Shea** (1–0)	Branca (0–1)	**Page** (1)	73,365	1–0	W1
2	October 1	Dodgers	10–3	**Reynolds** (1–0)	Lombardi (0–1)	–	69,865	2–0	W2
3	October 2	@ Dodgers	8–9	Casey (1–0)	**Newsom** (0–1)	–	33,098	2–1	L1
4	October 3	@ Dodgers	2–3	Casey (2–0)	**Bevens** (0–1)	–	33,443	2–2	L2
5	October 4	@ Dodgers	2–1	**Shea** (2–0)	Barney (0–1)	–	34,379	3–2	W1
6	October 5	Dodgers	6–8	Ralph Branca (1–1)	**Page** (0–1)	Casey (1)	74,065	3–3	L1
7	October 6	Dodgers	5–2	**Page** (1–1)	Hal Gregg (0–1)	–	71,548	4–3	W1

== Player stats ==
=== Batting ===
==== Starters by position ====
Note: Pos = Position; G = Games played; AB = At bats; H = Hits; Avg. = Batting average; HR = Home runs; RBI = Runs batted in

Pos	Player	G	AB	H	Avg.	HR	RBI
C	Aaron Robinson	82	252	68	.270	5	36
1B	George McQuinn	144	517	157	.304	13	80
2B	Snuffy Stirnweiss	148	571	146	.256	5	41
3B	Billy Johnson	132	494	141	.285	10	95
SS	Phil Rizzuto	153	549	150	.273	2	60
OF	Joe DiMaggio	141	534	168	.315	20	97
OF	Tommy Henrich	142	440	158	.287	16	98
OF	Johnny Lindell	127	476	131	.275	11	67

==== Other batters ====
Note: G = Games played; AB = At bats; H = Hits; Avg. = Batting average; HR = Home runs; RBI = Runs batted in

Player	G	AB	H	Avg.	HR	RBI
Yogi Berra	83	293	82	.280	11	54
Charlie Keller	45	151	36	.238	13	36
Bobby Brown	69	150	45	.300	1	18
Ralph Houk	41	92	25	.272	0	12
Allie Clark	24	67	25	.373	1	14
Jack Phillips	16	36	10	.278	1	2
Sherm Lollar	11	32	7	.219	1	6
Frank Colman	22	28	3	.107	2	6
Lonny Frey	24	28	5	.179	0	2
Johnny Lucadello	12	12	1	.083	0	0
Ken Silvestri	3	10	2	.200	0	0
Frankie Crosetti	3	1	0	.000	0	0
Ray Mack	1	0	0	----	0	0
Ted Sepkowski	2	0	0	----	0	0

=== Pitching ===
==== Starting pitchers ====
Note: G = Games pitched; IP = Innings pitched; W = Wins; L = Losses; ERA = Earned run average; SO = Strikeouts

Player	G	IP	W	L	ERA	SO
Allie Reynolds	34	241.2	19	8	3.20	129
Spec Shea	27	178.2	14	5	3.07	89
Bill Bevens	28	165.0	7	13	3.82	77
Spud Chandler	17	128.0	9	5	2.46	68
Bobo Newsom	17	115.2	7	5	2.80	42
Vic Raschi	15	104.2	7	2	3.87	51
Bill Wight	1	9.0	1	0	1.00	3

==== Other pitchers ====
Note: G = Games pitched; IP = Innings pitched; W = Wins; L = Losses; ERA = Earned run average; SO = Strikeouts

Player	G	IP	W	L	ERA	SO
Karl Drews	30	91.2	6	6	4.91	45
Randy Gumpert	24	56.1	4	1	5.43	25
Don Johnson	15	54.1	4	3	3.64	16
Butch Wensloff	11	51.2	3	1	2.61	18
Dick Starr	4	12.1	1	0	1.46	1
Tommy Byrne	4	4.1	0	0	4.15	2

==== Relief pitchers ====
Note: G = Games pitched; W = Wins; L = Losses; SV = Saves; ERA = Earned run average; SO = Strikeouts

Player	G	W	L	SV	ERA	SO
Joe Page	56	14	8	16	2.48	116
Al Lyons	6	1	0	0	9.00	7
Mel Queen	5	0	0	0	9.45	2
Rugger Ardizoia	1	0	0	0	9.00	0

== 1947 World Series ==
AL New York Yankees (4) vs. NL Brooklyn Dodgers (3)

Game	Score	Date	Attendance
1	**New York 5**, Brooklyn 3	September 30	73,365
2	**New York 10**, Brooklyn 3	October 1	69,865
3	**Brooklyn 9**, New York 8	October 2	33,098
4	**Brooklyn 3**, New York 2	October 3	33,443
5	**New York 2**, Brooklyn 1	October 4	34,379
6	**Brooklyn 8**, New York 6	October 5	74,065
7	**New York 5**, Brooklyn 2	October 6	71,548

== Awards and honors ==
- All-Star Game
  - Spud Chandler
  - Joe DiMaggio (starting CF)
  - Tommy Henrich
  - Billy Johnson
  - Charlie Keller
  - George McQuinn (starting 1B)
  - Joe Page
  - Aaron Robinson
  - Spec Shea

== Farm system ==
Level	Team	League	Manager
AAA	Kansas City Blues	American Association	Billy Meyer
AAA	Newark Bears	International League	George Selkirk
AA	Beaumont Exporters	Texas League	Goldie Holt
A	Binghamton Triplets	Eastern League	Lefty Gomez
A	Augusta Tigers	Sally League	Dib Williams and Carl Cooper
A	Denver Bears	Western League	Marty McManus
B	Quincy Gems	Illinois–Indiana–Iowa League	Gordie Hinkle
B	Sunbury Yankees	Interstate League	Walt Van Grofski
B	Norfolk Tars	Piedmont League	Buddy Hassett
B	Victoria Athletics	Western International League	Ted Norbert
C	Bisbee Yanks	Arizona–Texas League	Charlie Metro
C	Ventura Yankees	California League	Mike Gazella and Johnny Sturm
C	Amsterdam Rugmakers	Canadian–American League	Solly Mishkin
C	Butler Yankees	Middle Atlantic League	Dallas Warren
C	Twin Falls Cowboys	Pioneer League	Earl Bolyard
C	Joplin Miners	Western Association	Jim McLeod
D	Easton Yankees	Eastern Shore League	Joe Antolick
D	Independence Yankees	Kansas–Oklahoma–Missouri League	Goldie Howard
D	Stroudsburg Poconos	North Atlantic League	Jack Farmer
D	Fond du Lac Panthers	Wisconsin State League	James Adlam

LEAGUE CHAMPIONS: Twin Falls
