= Burt Shotton =

American baseball player and manager (1884–1962)

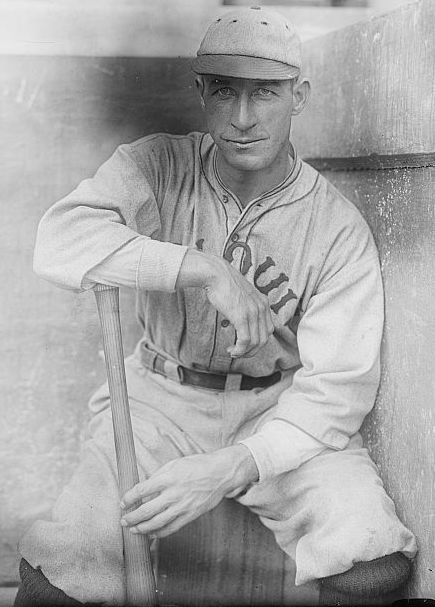
- Outfielder / Manager
- Born: October 18, 1884; Brownhelm Township, Ohio, U.S.
- Died: July 29, 1962 (aged 77); Lake Wales, Florida, U.S.
- Batted: Left Threw: Right

MLB debut
- September 13, 1909, for the St. Louis Browns

Last MLB appearance
- April 21, 1923, for the St. Louis Cardinals

MLB statistics
- Batting average: .271
- Home runs: 9
- Runs batted in: 290
- Managerial record: 697–764
- Winning %: .477
- Stats at Baseball Reference
- Managerial record at Baseball Reference

Teams
- As player: St. Louis Browns (1909, 1911–1917); Washington Senators (1918); St. Louis Cardinals (1919–1923); As manager: Philadelphia Phillies (1928–1933); Cincinnati Reds (1934); Brooklyn Dodgers (1947, 1948–1950); As coach: St. Louis Cardinals (1923–1925); Cincinnati Reds (1934); Cleveland Indians (1942–1945)

Burton Edwin Shotton (October 18, 1884 – July 29, 1962) was an American player, manager, coach and scout in Major League Baseball. As manager of the Brooklyn Dodgers (1947; 1948–50), he won two National League pennants and served as Jackie Robinson's first permanent Major League manager.

== Playing career ==
Shotton was born in Brownhelm, a township in Lorain County, Ohio. In his playing days, he was a speedy outfielder — he was nicknamed "Barney" after record-setting race car driver Barney Oldfield — who batted left-handed and threw right-handed. The 5 ft 11 in (1.80 m), 175 lb (79 kg) Shotton compiled a .271 batting average with 1,338 hits in 1,387 Major League games played for the St. Louis Browns (1909, 1911–17), Washington Senators (1918) and St. Louis Cardinals (1919–23).

Although he stole over 40 bases in four consecutive seasons (1913–16), he was also caught stealing over 26 times in each of those seasons. In an American League dominated by speedsters such as Ty Cobb and Clyde Milan, Shotton was never among the top five base stealers in the league, and he had a high rate of being caught stealing, but he pilfered 294 bases during his MLB career. His real talent, however, may be shown in his on-base percentage, in which he finished in the top ten in the league four times in his career. He twice (in 1913 and 1916) led AL batters in walks, and finished in the top ten six seasons.

In the early 1920s, as a player and coach, he was the Cardinals' "Sunday manager", relieving skipper Branch Rickey, who always observed the Christian Sabbath. Rickey and Shotton had formed a longstanding friendship and professional relationship dating back to their years together (1913–15) with the Browns, when Rickey was his manager. After Shotton retired as a player, he served on the Cardinals' coaching staff from 1923 to 1925, mainly under Rickey, who was replaced by Rogers Hornsby on May 31, 1925, and moved into the club's front office. Shotton's record as the Redbirds' "Sunday manager" between April 22, 1923, and Hornsby's accession was 27–25.

Then, in 1926, Cardinal owner Sam Breadon appointed Shotton the manager of the team's top farm club, the Syracuse Stars of the International League. His 1927 Syracuse club posted a 102–66 record, but finished second, ten games behind league champion Buffalo.

== Philadelphia Phillies ==
Shotton's first formal Major League managing opportunity came the following year with the NL's then-habitually tailend team, the Philadelphia Phillies. He lasted six seasons (1928–33) with the Phils, who twice lost more than 100 games during his tenure. The Shotton-era Phillies included two notable teams. Playing home games in a notorious bandbox, Baker Bowl, during a "lively ball" season, the 1930 edition compiled a team batting average of .315 (paced by Chuck Klein's .386 and Lefty O'Doul's .383) and scored 944 runs; but the Phillie pitching staff allowed 1,199 runs and posted a horrendous 6.71 earned run average and the club finished last, at 52–102. Then, only two years later, the 1932 team compiled a 78–76 record, good enough for fourth place in the National League. It would be the Phillies' only winning season and first-division finish between 1917 and 1949. Altogether, Shotton's win–loss mark in Philadelphia was 370–549 (.403).

Shotton then coached for the Cincinnati Reds in 1934. On July 28, he had a one-game stint as interim manager after the firing of Bob O'Farrell and before new skipper Chuck Dressen arrived from Nashville to take command of the last-place Reds; in that game, Cincinnati defeated the Chicago Cubs, 11–2. Then Shotton returned to the Cardinals for a seven-year term (1935–41) managing their top-level Rochester Red Wings and Columbus Red Birds farm clubs, and spent four years (1942–45) on the coaching staff of player-manager Lou Boudreau of the Cleveland Indians.

But prior to the 1946 season, Shotton hung up his uniform and settled into a scouting role for the Brooklyn Dodgers, for whom Rickey was now part-owner, president and general manager.

== A stand-in for Durocher ==
On the eve of the 1947 season, Shotton received a telegram from Rickey; it read: "Be in Brooklyn in the morning. Call nobody, see no one". Flying immediately from his Florida home to New York, not knowing what to expect, Shotton was ushered into Rickey's presence. Leo Durocher, the Dodgers' manager since 1939, had been suspended for the entire 1947 campaign by Baseball Commissioner Happy Chandler for "conduct detrimental to baseball." In his search for a temporary replacement, Rickey had been rebuffed by former New York Yankees manager Joe McCarthy, then in retirement, and two of Durocher's coaches, Clyde Sukeforth (who managed the first two games of the season on an emergency basis) and Ray Blades.

Rickey pleaded with Shotton to take over the Dodgers for the remainder of the season. Then 62, and convinced that his on-field career was over, Shotton reluctantly took the reins on April 18, still in street clothes. In doing so, he became one of the last MLB managers to wear everyday apparel rather than the club uniform. Unlike Connie Mack, however, he did usually add his team's cap and jacket.

He inherited a contending Brooklyn team that had finished in a flatfooted tie for the 1946 National League pennant before losing a playoff series to the Cardinals. He also inherited what historian Jules Tygiel called Baseball's Great Experiment — the Dodgers' breaking of the infamous color line by bringing up Jackie Robinson from their Triple-A Montreal Royals farm club at the start of the 1947 season to end over sixty years of racial segregation in "Organized Baseball's" playing ranks. The rookie was facing withering insults from opposing players, and a petition by Dodger players protesting Robinson's presence had only recently been quashed by Durocher.

Shotton's calm demeanor, however, provided the quiet leadership the Dodgers needed. They won the National League pennant by five games, and took the New York Yankees to seven games in the 1947 World Series. In Game 4, Shotton helped to thwart Bill Bevens' no-hit bid in the ninth inning, sending into the game two pinch hitters and two pinch runners in an attempt to overcome a 2–1 deficit. The gambit worked, as Dodger pinch hitter Cookie Lavagetto drove home both pinch runners, Al Gionfriddo and Eddie Miksis, with his opposite-field double — Brooklyn's only hit — for a 3–2 victory.

With Durocher's suspension over, Shotton retired again, this time to a front office post as "managerial consultant" in the Dodgers' vast farm system. But the 1948 Dodgers did not respond to Durocher's return; they even (briefly, on May 24) fell into the NL cellar. Durocher was still under siege by the Catholic Youth Organization because of his extramarital relationship with, and then quick marriage to, actress Laraine Day.

== Return to Brooklyn's bench ==
With the New York Giants also floundering, owner Horace Stoneham decided to replace his manager, Mel Ott, with Shotton. He called Rickey to ask permission to speak with Shotton about the Giants' job, and was stunned when Rickey offered him the opportunity to hire Durocher instead. On July 16, 1948, Durocher moved from Brooklyn to Upper Manhattan to take over the Giants. The following day, Shotton was back in the Dodger dugout — still in street clothes. On that day, Brooklyn was 37–37 and in fourth place, 81/2 games behind the Boston Braves.

After his return, the Dodgers rallied to take the lead in the 1948 NL standings by the end of August, before they faltered in September to finish third, 71/2 games behind Boston. Then, in 1949, Shotton won his second pennant, with Brooklyn capturing 97 regular-season victories to finish a game ahead of the Cardinals. Robinson won the National League's Most Valuable Player award and batting championship. But Brooklyn again bowed to the Yankees in the World Series, this time in only five games. Despite Shotton's two pennants in three seasons, he continually faced criticism from Durocher loyalists on the Dodgers, who claimed that Shotton was a poor game strategist and lacked Durocher's competitive intensity. Because he eschewed wearing a uniform, Shotton was prohibited from stepping onto the field of play during games to argue with umpires and make pitching changes; those tasks fell to one of his uniformed coaches.

Shotton also had severe critics within the press, notably New York Daily News baseball writer Dick Young, who came to refer to him in print only by the derisive acronym KOBS, short for "Kindly Old Burt Shotton." Shotton's poor relationship with the New York media partly was self-inflicted: according to author Roger Kahn, he attempted to ban Young from the Brooklyn clubhouse, and alienated and infuriated the New York Herald-Tribune's Harold Rosenthal by repeatedly addressing him as "Rosenberg" and "Rosenbloom."

In 1950, despite chronic pitching woes, Shotton guided the Dodgers to within a game of first place on the final day of the season. But Dick Sisler's tenth-inning home run off Don Newcombe won the pennant for the Phillies' "Whiz Kids", and ended both the Dodger season and Shotton's managerial career. Rickey was forced from the Brooklyn front office by new majority owner Walter O'Malley at the end of October. At his home in Bartow, Florida, Shotton ignored O'Malley's repeated suggestions that he fly back north to discuss his future, saying later, "There was no point coming to Brooklyn to be fired." Indeed, O'Malley had already decided on Chuck Dressen as his new manager; his hiring was formally announced November 28. In contrast to Shotton, the fiery Dressen would be conspicuous on the field wearing uniform No. 7 and doubling as Brooklyn's third-base coach.

=== Managerial record ===
Team	Year	Regular season					Postseason			
Team	Year	Games	Won	Lost	Win %	Finish	Won	Lost	Win %	Result
STL	1923	22	13	9	.591	-	–	–	–	–
STL	1924	25	12	13	.480	-	–	–	–	–
STL	1925	5	2	3	.400	-	–	–	–	–
STL total		52	27	25	.519		–	–	–	–
PHI	1928	152	43	109	.283	8th in NL	–	–	–	–
PHI	1929	154	71	82	.464	5th in NL	–	–	–	–
PHI	1930	154	52	102	.338	8th in NL	–	–	–	–
PHI	1931	155	66	88	.429	6th in NL	–	–	–	–
PHI	1932	154	78	76	.506	4th in NL	–	–	–	–
PHI	1933	152	60	92	.395	7th in NL	–	–	–	–
PHI total		923	370	549	.403		–	–	–	–
CIN	1934	1	1	0	1.000	(interim)	–	–	–	–
CIN total		1	1	0	1.000		–	–	–	–
BKN	1947	153	92	60	.605	1st in NL	3	4	.429	Lost World Series (NYY)
BKN	1948	81	48	33	.593	3rd in NL		–	–	–
BKN	1949	156	97	57	.630	1st in NL	1	4	.200	Lost World Series (NYY)
BKN	1950	155	89	65	.578	2nd in NL	–	–	–	–
BKN total		545	326	215	.603		4	8	.333	
Total		1,521	724	789	.479		4	8	.333	

== In retirement ==
Shotton's last connection with baseball was as a consultant for Rickey's Continental League, the planned "third major league" that ultimately forced expansion of MLB in 1961–62. In 1960, Rickey, the CL president, engaged Shotton to assist and supervise the managers in the Western Carolinas League, a Class D minor league originally set up to groom talent for the CL.

Shotton died in Lake Wales, Florida, from a heart attack at age 77 during the second All-Star break in 1962. Although his career win–loss record as a big league manager was 724–789 (.479), his mark with the Dodgers was 326–215 (.603).

According to an informal study by researchers at the National Baseball Hall of Fame, the last manager to wear street clothes is believed to be Shotton, who last managed a game on Sunday, October 1, 1950. (Connie Mack, who famously wore a full suit during his 50 years as manager of the Philadelphia Athletics, also retired on October 1, 1950, but his game that day ended earlier.)

== In popular culture ==
In the 2013 film 42, Shotton is played by Max Gail.

== See also ==
- 1947 Brooklyn Dodgers season
- Jackie Robinson
- List of Major League Baseball career stolen bases leaders
- List of St. Louis Cardinals coaches

Sporting positions
Preceded by Harry Myers	Syracuse Stars manager 1926–1927	Succeeded by Franchise relocated
Preceded by Eddie Dyer	Rochester Red Wings manager 1935	Succeeded by Ray Blades
Preceded by Ray Blades	Columbus Red Birds manager 1936–1941	Succeeded by Eddie Dyer
