= Rugger =

Rugger may refer to:

- a slang word for rugby football (UK), or a rugby player (US)
- Rugger Ardizoia (1919–2015), Italian baseball player
- Uli Rugger (died 1540), a person executed for homosexuality in Europe
- Rugger (Star Wars), a fictional creature in the Star Wars universe
- Daihatsu Rugger, an off-road vehicle

== See also ==
- RUG (disambiguation)
- Carpet
