= Gionfriddo =

Gionfriddo is a surname. Notable people with the surname include:

- Al Gionfriddo (1922–2003), American professional baseball player
- Gina Gionfriddo (born 1969), American playwright and television writer
