= Billy Johnson (baseball) =

American baseball player (1918–2006)

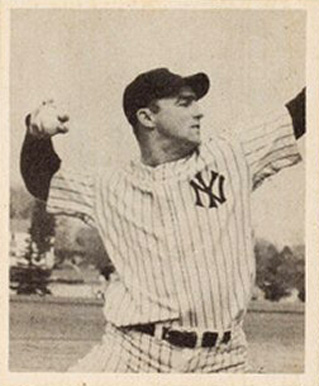
- Third baseman
- Born: August 30, 1918; Montclair, New Jersey, U.S.
- Died: June 20, 2006 (aged 87); Augusta, Georgia, U.S.
- Batted: Right Threw: Right

MLB debut
- April 22, 1943, for the New York Yankees

Last MLB appearance
- May 10, 1953, for the St. Louis Cardinals

MLB statistics
- Batting average: .271
- Home runs: 61
- Runs batted in: 487
- Stats at Baseball Reference

Teams
- New York Yankees (1943, 1946–1951); St. Louis Cardinals (1951–1953)

Career highlights and awards
- All-Star (1947); 4× World Series champion (1943, 1947, 1949, 1950)

William Russell Johnson (August 30, 1918 – June 20, 2006) was an American professional baseball player. He was a third baseman in Major League Baseball who played in 964 games for the New York Yankees in the 1940s and later with the St. Louis Cardinals.

Johnson was born in Montclair, New Jersey, and debuted in 1943. He had an impressive rookie season which earned him 4th place in American League MVP voting. After missing 1944–1945 for wartime service in the United States Army, where he fought in the European Theater of Operations, he returned to MLB to spend the next five seasons as a regular third baseman. Nicknamed "Bull", and standing 5 feet 10 inches (178 cm) tall and weighing 180 pounds (82 kg; 13 st), Johnson was named an All-Star in 1947, and was a part of four championship teams in his six seasons as a regular. He was traded to the St. Louis Cardinals in 1951 to allow Gil McDougald, a hot prospect for the Yankees, to play his position full-time. He served as the Cards' third baseman for two years before retiring during the 1953 season.

In 964 games over nine seasons, Johnson posted a .271 batting average (882-for-3253) with 419 runs, 61 home runs, 487 RBI and 347 bases on balls. He finished his career with a .960 fielding percentage playing at third and first base. In 18 World Series games, he batted .237 (14-for-59) with 11 runs, 4 triples, 5 RBI and 3 walks.

In later years he worked as a shipping supervisor in Augusta, Georgia. He died there on June 20, 2006. He was the last surviving member of the 1943 World Champion New York Yankees.
