= 1947 World Series =

Championship series of Major League Baseball in 1947

Team (Wins)	Managers	Season
New York Yankees (4)	Bucky Harris	97–57, .630, GA: 12
Brooklyn Dodgers (3)	Burt Shotton	94–60, .610, GA: 5
- Dates: September 30 – October 6
- Venue(s): Yankee Stadium (New York); Ebbets Field (Brooklyn)
- Umpires: Bill McGowan (AL), Babe Pinelli (NL), Eddie Rommel (AL), Larry Goetz (NL), Jim Boyer (AL: outfield only), George Magerkurth (NL: outfield only)
- Hall of Famers: Umpire: Bill McGowan; Yankees: Bucky Harris (mgr.); Yogi Berra; Joe DiMaggio; Phil Rizzuto; Dodgers: Gil Hodges; Pee Wee Reese; Jackie Robinson; Duke Snider (DNP); Arky Vaughan

Broadcast
- Television: NBC (Games 1, 5); CBS (Games 3–4); DuMont (Games 2, 6–7)
- TV announcers: Bob Stanton (Games 1, 5); Bob Edge (Games 3–4); Bill Slater (Games 2, 6–7)
- Radio: Mutual
- Radio announcers: Mel Allen and Red Barber

The 1947 World Series matched the New York Yankees against the Brooklyn Dodgers. The Yankees won the Series in seven games for their 11th World Series championship in team history. Yankees manager Bucky Harris won the Series for the first time since managing the Washington Senators to their only title in 1924, a gap of 23 years, the longest between World Series appearances in history.

In 1947, Jackie Robinson, a Brooklyn Dodger, desegregated major league baseball. For the first time in World Series history, a racially integrated team played.

This was the first World Series televised. However, TV broadcasting was still in its infancy, and thus the series was only seen in four markets via coaxial inter-connected stations: New York City; Philadelphia; Schenectady/Albany, New York; Washington, D.C. Outside of New York, coverage was pooled. The stations in those markets affiliated with NBC televised games 1 and 5; the DuMont stations had games 2, 6, and 7, and those affiliated with CBS broadcast games 3 and 4.

== Summary ==
AL New York Yankees (4) vs. NL Brooklyn Dodgers (3)

Game	Date	Score	Location	Time	Attendance
1	September 30	Brooklyn Dodgers – 3, New York Yankees – 5	Yankee Stadium	2:20	73,365
2	October 1	Brooklyn Dodgers – 3, New York Yankees – 10	Yankee Stadium	2:36	69,865
3	October 2	New York Yankees – 8, Brooklyn Dodgers – 9	Ebbets Field	3:05	33,098
4	October 3	New York Yankees – 2, Brooklyn Dodgers – 3	Ebbets Field	2:20	33,443
5	October 4	New York Yankees – 2, Brooklyn Dodgers – 1	Ebbets Field	2:46	34,379
6	October 5	Brooklyn Dodgers – 8, New York Yankees – 6	Yankee Stadium	3:19	74,065
7	October 6	Brooklyn Dodgers – 2, New York Yankees – 5	Yankee Stadium	2:19	71,548

== Matchups ==
=== Game 1 ===
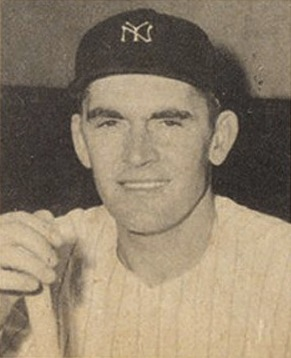
Johnny Lindell

Tuesday, September 30, 1947 1:30 pm (ET) at Yankee Stadium in Bronx, New York
Team	1	2	3	4	5	6	7	8	9	R	H	E
Brooklyn	1	0	0	0	0	1	1	0	0	3	6	0
New York	0	0	0	0	5	0	0	0	X	5	4	0
WP: Spec Shea (1–0) LP: Ralph Branca (0–1) Sv: Joe Page (1)

There was an announced crowd of 73,365 in Yankee Stadium for Game 1. Brooklyn struck first in the first inning on Dixie Walker's RBI single off Spec Shea to score Pete Reiser from second base, but starter Ralph Branca was knocked out in a five-run fifth. A single, walk and hit-by-pitch loaded the bases before Johnny Lindell's two-run double put the Yankees up 2–1. After a walk re-loaded the bases, another walk forced in a run, then after a groundout, Tommy Henrich's RBI single to left off Hank Behrman capped the inning's scoring. The Dodgers chipped away at the Yankees lead, getting a run in the sixth on Carl Furillo's RBI single off Joe Page and another in the seventh on Page's wild pitch with Pee Wee Reese at second, but Page held the Dodgers scoreless afterward as the Yankees took a 1–0 series lead.

=== Game 2 ===
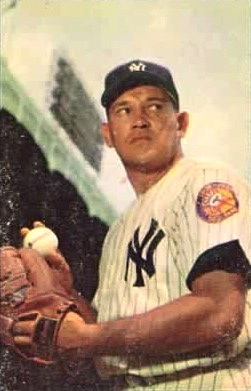
Allie Reynolds

Wednesday, October 1, 1947 1:30 pm (ET) at Yankee Stadium in Bronx, New York
Team	1	2	3	4	5	6	7	8	9	R	H	E
Brooklyn	0	0	1	1	0	0	0	0	1	3	9	2
New York	1	0	1	1	2	1	4	0	X	10	15	1
WP: Allie Reynolds (1–0) LP: Vic Lombardi (0–1); Home runs: BRO: Dixie Walker (1); NYY: Tommy Henrich (1)

The Yankees struck first in Game 2 on Johnny Lindell's double-play ground ball after two leadoff singles in the first off Vic Lombardi, scoring Snuffy Stirnweiss, but the Dodgers tied the game in the third on Jackie Robinson's RBI single. The Yankees regained the lead in the bottom half of the inning on Lindell's RBI triple with a runner at third, but the Dodgers again tied the game in the fourth on Dixie Walker's home run. Walker's round tripper would be the Dodgers only home run in the series. In the bottom half of the fourth, after a leadoff triple, Phil Rizzuto's RBI double put the Yankees back in front 3–2. In the next inning, Tommy Henrich's lead-off home run extended their lead to 4–2. After a ground-rule double knocked Lombardi out of the game, George McQuinn's RBI single off Hal Gregg made it 5–2 Yankees. The Yankees added another run in the sixth on Lindell's sacrifice fly before breaking it open in the seventh. After a leadoff single and wild pitch by Hank Behrman, Billy Johnson's RBI single made it 7–2 Yankees. After a pop out and intentional walk, Reynolds's RBI single made it 8–2 Yankees. Rex Barney relieved Behrman and allowed an RBI single to Snuffy Stirnweiss and threw a wild pitch that turned the Yanks' advantage to 10–2. The Dodgers scored one more run in the ninth on Spider Jorgensen's groundout off Allie Reynolds, who scattered nine hits in a complete-game win.

=== Game 3 ===
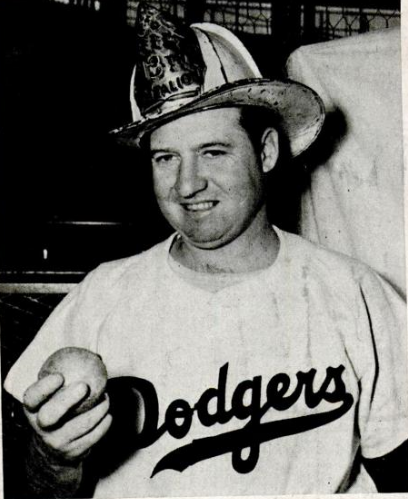
Hugh Casey

Thursday, October 2, 1947 1:30 pm (ET) at Ebbets Field in Brooklyn, New York
Team	1	2	3	4	5	6	7	8	9	R	H	E
New York	0	0	2	2	2	1	1	0	0	8	13	0
Brooklyn	0	6	1	2	0	0	0	0	X	9	13	1
WP: Hugh Casey (1–0) LP: Bobo Newsom (0–1); Home runs: NYY: Joe DiMaggio (1), Yogi Berra (1); BRO: None

The series shifted to Ebbets Field. In the second inning the Dodgers rang up six runs. After a one-out walk, Bruce Edwards's double and Pee Wee Reese's single scored a run each. One out later, after a single and passed ball, Eddie Stanky's two-run double was the end for Yankee starter Bobo Newsom, but the runs kept coming with a Carl Furillo two-run double after a single off Vic Raschi. The rest of the day, the Yankees pecked away. Back-to-back RBI singles by Johnny Lindell and Joe DiMaggio off Joe Hatten made it 6–2 Dodgers in the third. After the Dodgers scored a run in the bottom half of the third on Spider Jorgensen's RBI single after a hit-by-pitch and wild pitch by Karl Drews, Sherm Lollar hit an RBI double in the fourth after a walk and Snuffy Stirnweiss added an RBI single. After two walks in the bottom half of the fourth off Spud Chandler, the Dodgers got those runs back on back-to-back RBI singles by Dixie Walker and Gene Hermanski, but Joe DiMaggio hit a two-run home run in the fifth after a walk. Tommy Henrich's RBI double in the next inning and Yogi Berra's home run in the seventh off Ralph Branca made it 9–8 Dodgers. Reliever Hugh Casey set down Billy Johnson, Phil Rizzuto and Berra in order in the ninth.

=== Game 4 ===
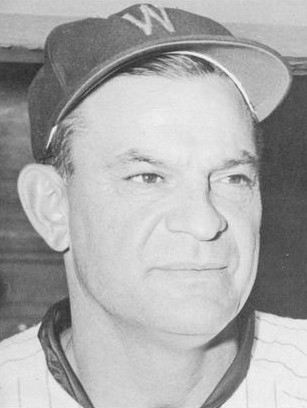
Cookie Lavagetto

Friday, October 3, 1947 1:30 pm (ET) at Ebbets Field in Brooklyn, New York
Team	1	2	3	4	5	6	7	8	9	R	H	E
New York	1	0	0	1	0	0	0	0	0	2	8	1
Brooklyn	0	0	0	0	1	0	0	0	2	3	1	3
WP: Hugh Casey (2–0) LP: Bill Bevens (0–1)

The Yankees entered Game 4 aiming to take a three games to one lead in the best-of-seven series, and came one out away from doing this. They scored a run in the first on a bases-loaded walk off Harry Taylor and another in the fourth on Johnny Lindell's double after a leadoff triple off Hal Gregg. Bill Bevens, the Yankee starter, pitched 8 2/3 innings without allowing a base hit, but allowed a run in the fifth on Pee Wee Reese's fielder's choice after two walks and a sacrifice bunt. No pitcher had ever thrown a no-hitter in a major league World Series game.

Going into the bottom of the ninth inning, Bevens and the Yankees led 2–1. Bevens got Bruce Edwards to fly out, and then walked Carl Furillo. Spider Jorgensen fouled out for the 2nd out. Al Gionfriddo pinch-ran for Furillo. Pete Reiser pinch-hit for pitcher Hugh Casey; during the at-bat, Gionfriddo stole second base. The Yankees then intentionally walked Reiser. Eddie Miksis pinch-ran for Reiser, and the Dodgers sent Cookie Lavagetto to pinch-hit for Eddie Stanky. Lavagetto lined a 1–0 fastball to right field; the ball ricocheted off the wall with a peculiar bounce and hit Yankee right fielder Tommy Henrich in the shoulder, as Gionfriddo and Miksis raced around to score. The play ended the no-hitter and won the game for the Dodgers.

The hit was the last of Lavagetto's career. Additionally, neither Lavagetto nor Bevens nor Gionfriddo would play in the majors again following this Series.

The Dodgers, with this hit, avoided a three-games-to-one deficit, avoided becoming the victim of a no-hitter, and tied the Series at two games each. The rapid and dramatic reversal of fortunes may have provided a momentum swing. The Dodgers were the first of two teams in MLB history to win a playoff game while being held to one hit (the Oakland A's would later do so in the 1974 ALCS).

As was the case in their only previous World Series encounter six years earlier, the Yankees and Dodgers again played a dramatic Game 4 which was decided on a lead change with two outs in the ninth inning. In both instances the Yankees entered the game with a 2–1 series lead and Hugh Casey ended up being the pitcher of record for the Dodgers (losing in 1941, winning in 1947).

Game 4 was the first of three times that the Dodgers won a World Series game after trailing through eight innings. This would also happen in 1988 during Game 1, and in 2025 during Game 7.

=== Game 5 ===
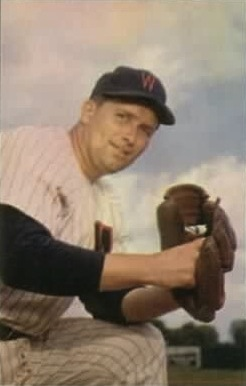
Spec Shea

Saturday, October 4, 1947 1:30 pm (ET) at Ebbets Field in Brooklyn, New York
Team	1	2	3	4	5	6	7	8	9	R	H	E
New York	0	0	0	1	1	0	0	0	0	2	5	0
Brooklyn	0	0	0	0	0	1	0	0	0	1	4	1
WP: Spec Shea (2–0) LP: Rex Barney (0–1); Home runs: NYY: Joe DiMaggio (2); BRO: None

Nine walks in fewer than five innings proved the undoing of Rex Barney in this start for Brooklyn. A pair of walks and RBI single by opposing pitcher Spec Shea in the fourth put the Yankees up 1–0. Joe DiMaggio homered to left in the fifth. That was all the runs the visiting Yanks would get at Ebbets Field, but this was all Shea needed. A hit by Jackie Robinson in the sixth scored Al Gionfriddo to pull the Dodgers within 2–1. Then in the ninth, after a Bruce Edwards leadoff single and sacrifice bunt by Carl Furillo, the tying run died on base. Shea got Spider Jorgensen on a fly to right, and with Brooklyn's fans on their feet, pinch-hitter Cookie Lavagetto struck out.

=== Game 6 ===
Sunday, October 5, 1947 2:00 pm (ET) at Yankee Stadium in Bronx, New York
Team	1	2	3	4	5	6	7	8	9	R	H	E
Brooklyn	2	0	2	0	0	4	0	0	0	8	12	1
New York	0	0	4	1	0	0	0	0	1	6	15	2
WP: Ralph Branca (1–1) LP: Joe Page (0–1) Sv: Hugh Casey (1)

The Dodgers won Game 6 to force a seventh and deciding game. Three straight singles loaded the bases in the first with no outs, then Dixie Walker's double play and Allie Reynolds's passed ball scored a run each. In the third, three straight doubles by Pee Wee Reese, Jackie Robinson and Walker made it 4–0 Dodgers. In the bottom of the inning, after a double and wild pitch by Vic Lombardi, an error on Snuffy Stirnweiss's ground ball allowed a run to score. After a single, Johnny Lindell's RBI single cut the Dodgers' lead to 4–2. After another single knocked Lombardi out of the game, RBI singles by Billy Johnson and Bobby Brown off Ralph Branca tied the game. Yogi Berra's RBI single next inning put the Yankees up 5–4. In the sixth, after a leadoff single and double off Joe Page, Cookie Lavagetto's sacrifice fly tied the game, then Bobby Bragan's RBI single put the Dodgers up 6–5. A single knocked Page out of the game, then Reese's two-run single off Bobo Newsom made it 8–5 Dodgers.

A catch made by Al Gionfriddo, replayed countless times, may be the most remembered play of this game, and one of the most remembered plays of the Series.

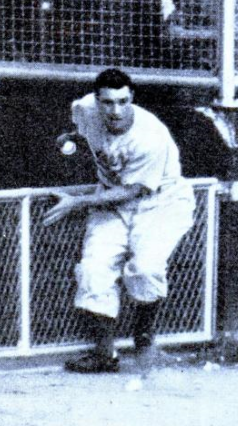
Al Gionfriddo's Game 6 catch.

In the last of the sixth, the Dodgers sent Al Gionfriddo to left field as a defensive replacement for Eddie Miksis. Joe Hatten came in to pitch. With two on and two outs, Joe DiMaggio came to bat for the Yankees, representing the potential tying run. DiMaggio drove the ball deep, and Gionfriddo quickly pedalled back to snare it just in front of the bullpen-alley fence, near the 415-foot (126 m) marker posted to the center field side of the bullpen alley (the sign on the left field side of the alley was posted as 402). Radio announcer Red Barber provided the play-by-play, which has often accompanied re-played film footage:

Swung on, belted... it's a long one... back goes Gionfriddo, back, back, back, back, back, back... heeee makes a one-handed catch against the bullpen! Oh, Doctor!

Many announcers since that time have used variations of the call, especially Chris Berman of ESPN. These announcers have tended to describe the ball itself as going "back-back-back". In Barber's call, it was the outfielder who was going "back-back-back". In Puerto Rico, sportscaster Hector Vazquez Muniz uses a Spanish variation of this call, in his case "Y se va, se va, se va!"

Films of the play showed DiMaggio, heading for second, kick the dirt in disgust after he realized Gionfriddo had caught the ball. This was a surprise to many who witnessed it, since DiMaggio was known to never show his emotions while playing. Red Barber declared it, "probably the only time ever that DiMaggio was publicly and visibly upset."

Three of the 1947 Series' prominent figures, Gionfriddo, Lavagetto and Bevens, finished their playing careers in this Series. Gionfriddo did not play in Game 7, and his catch of DiMaggio's drive was his only put-out in this game. So Gionfriddo's famous catch was his final put-out in his major league career.

The Yankees loaded the bases in the bottom of the ninth off Joe Hatten and Hugh Casey, but scored only once on a groundout.

=== Game 7 ===
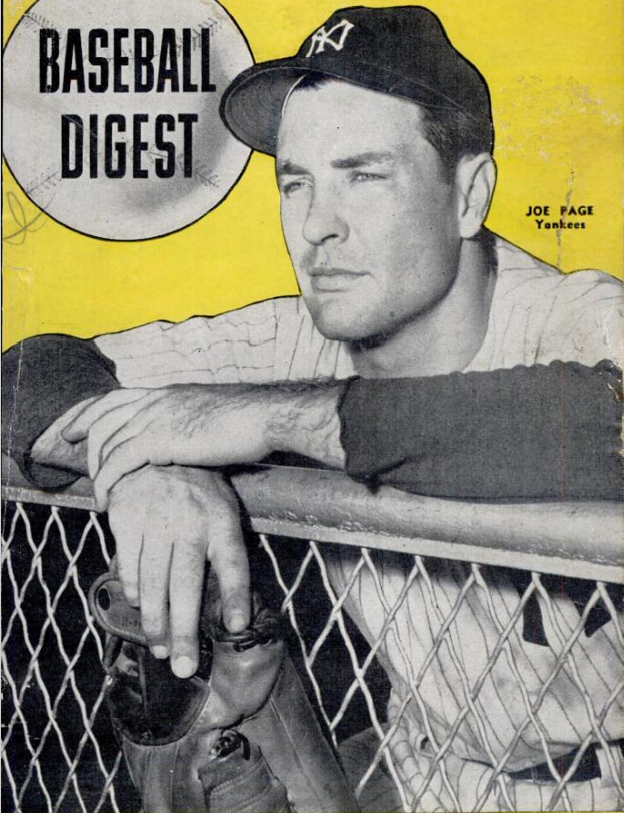
Joe Page

Monday, October 6, 1947 1:30 pm (ET) at Yankee Stadium in Bronx, New York
Team	1	2	3	4	5	6	7	8	9	R	H	E
Brooklyn	0	2	0	0	0	0	0	0	0	2	7	0
New York	0	1	0	2	0	1	1	0	X	5	7	0
WP: Joe Page (1–1) LP: Hal Gregg (0–1)

The scoring began in the second inning, when the Dodgers strung together four consecutive hits: three off of Yankee starter Spec Shea, and a fourth off of reliever Bill Bevens, to put the Dodgers ahead, 2–0, in the top half of the inning. Gene Hermanski tripled, Bruce Edwards drove Hermanski in with a single, and Carl Furillo followed with another single, prompting a pitching change. Spider Jorgensen greeted reliever Bevens with a double, scoring Edwards for the second run.

In the bottom half of the second inning, the Yankees cut the lead to 2–1. After Dodger starter Hal Gregg issued two walks, Phil Rizzuto delivered an RBI single, scoring George McQuinn.

In the bottom of the fourth, the Yankees took the lead with a two-out rally. With two runners on, Bobby Brown, pinch-hitting for Bevens, doubled off of Gregg, scoring Billy Johnson to tie the game. Hank Behrman replaced Gregg. After a walk loaded the bases, Tommy Henrich stroked an RBI single, scoring Rizzuto and putting the Yankees up 3–2.

With this lead, Yankee pitcher Joe Page entered the game to begin the top of the fifth inning, and would close the game out. Over the next five innings, Page retired 13 consecutive Dodger batters. During this time, the Yankees added two runs. Rizzuto lead off the bottom of the sixth with a bunt single, and stole second base; Allie Clark drove him home with a single off of Joe Hatten, making the score 4–2. In the bottom of the seventh, Aaron Robinson hit a sacrifice fly off of Hugh Casey, to score Billy Johnson, who had just tripled.

In all, Page pitched five innings of one-hit, shutout relief. With one out in the top of the ninth, he allowed his first and only baserunner of the outing, when Eddie Miksis singled. Page quickly recovered, inducing Edwards to ground into a double play that ended the game. This was the most recent World Series to end on a double play until 2025, which also involved the Dodgers, but this time as the winners, and which was also decided in seven games.

== Composite line score ==
1947 World Series (4–3): New York Yankees (A.L.) over Brooklyn Dodgers (N.L.)

Team	1	2	3	4	5	6	7	8	9	R	H	E
New York Yankees	2	1	7	8	10	3	6	0	1	38	67	4
Brooklyn Dodgers	3	8	4	3	1	6	1	0	3	29	52	8
Total attendance: 389,763 Average attendance: 55,680; Winning player's share: $5,830 Losing player's share: $4,081

== Records and important events ==
For the first time, a World Series produced total receipts over $2 million: Gate receipts were $1,781,348.92, radio rights $175,000.00 and television rights $65,000.

Yogi Berra pinch-hit for Sherm Lollar in the seventh inning of Game 3 and hit the first pinch-hit home run in World Series history. Ralph Branca served the pitch.

This was the first World Series to be televised, although the games were only seen in a small number of Eastern markets with stations connected via coaxial cable: New York City, New York; Philadelphia, Pennsylvania; Schenectady, New York; Washington, DC; and environs surrounding these cities. The October 18, 1947 edition of Billboard reported that a total of over 3.9 million people viewed the seven games, primarily on TV sets located in bars (Billboard estimated 5,400 tavern TV sets in NYC alone, with 4,870 in use). The October 13, 1947, edition of Time magazine reported that President Truman, who had just made the first Oval Office TV appearance on October 5, 1947, and received the first TV for the White House, watched parts of the Series but "skipped the last innings".

At the direction of Commissioner Happy Chandler, the Series, for the first time, used six umpires to make calls. Series from 1918 through 1946 used four umpires in the infield, with two alternates available if needed. However, no alternate had ever been needed, and Chandler believed that enlisting these umpires to make calls along the outfield lines would put these men and their skills to better use. However, it was not until 1964 that the additional two umpires rotated into the infield during the course of the Series.

This was the first, and to date only, World Series in which the Yankees won Game 7 in their home stadium.

== See also ==
- Subway Series / Dodgers–Yankees rivalry
