= Joe Page =

American baseball player (1917–1980)

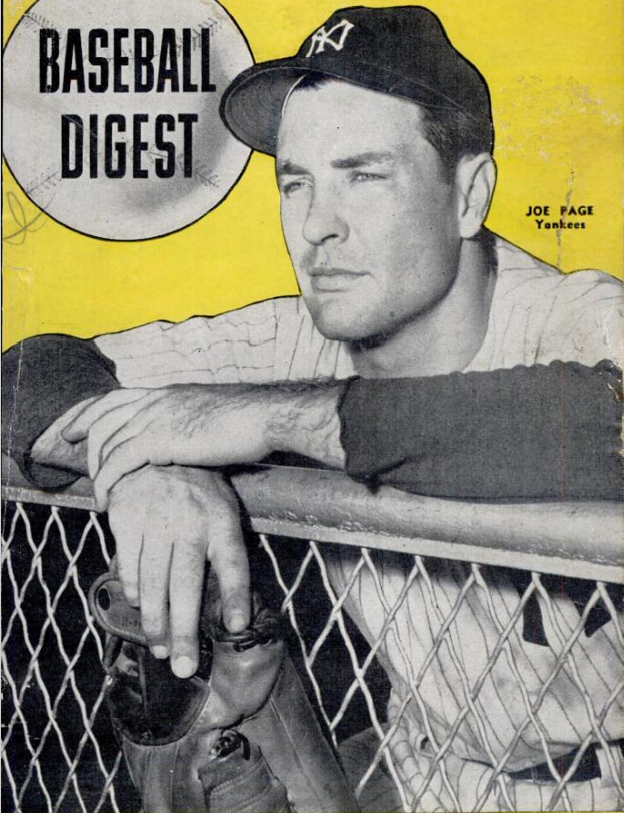
- Pitcher
- Born: October 28, 1917; Cherry Valley, Pennsylvania, U.S.
- Died: April 21, 1980 (aged 62); Latrobe, Pennsylvania, U.S.
- Batted: Left Threw: Left

MLB debut
- April 19, 1944, for the New York Yankees

Last MLB appearance
- May 25, 1954, for the Pittsburgh Pirates

MLB statistics
- Win–loss record: 57–49
- Earned run average: 3.53
- Strikeouts: 519
- Saves: 76
- Stats at Baseball Reference

Teams
- New York Yankees (1944–1950); Pittsburgh Pirates (1954)

Career highlights and awards
- 3× All-Star (1944, 1947, 1948); 2× World Series champion (1947, 1949)

Joseph Francis Page (October 28, 1917 – April 21, 1980), nicknamed "Fireman" and "the Gay Reliever", was an American professional baseball relief pitcher. Page, who was left-handed, played in Major League Baseball with the New York Yankees from 1944 to 1950 and with the Pittsburgh Pirates in 1954.

== Professional career ==
Page was signed by the New York Yankees as an amateur free agent in 1940. After spending time in the Yankees farm system, Page made his Major League Baseball debut on April 19, 1944 where he began his career as a starter.

In his rookie season (starting 16 games, and relieving in three others), Page was voted to play in the All-Star Game and ended his season with over 100 innings pitched and a 4.56 ERA. The next season, Page suffered a shoulder injury, which led him to start only nine of the twenty games he pitched. That season, Page improved his ERA to 2.82, along with a 6–3 record.

In 1946, Page split his time between closing and starting games, and he picked up three saves while posting a 3.57 ERA and a 9–8 record. In 1947, Page spent practically the whole season in the bullpen and only started twice. He was voted to play in the All-Star Game once again, because of his 2.48 ERA and a 14–8 record. Retroactively, he is considered to have recorded 17 saves that year. However, it was certainly appreciated at the time that Page played a greater than average role as the Yankees relief pitcher, at a time when there was no generally acknowledged "closing pitcher" role in baseball, and when starting pitchers were more often expected to finish complete games.

His fourteen relief wins in 1947 was an American League record until Luis Arroyo broke it in 1961. He was fourth in the league in American League MVP voting. In the seventh game of the 1947 World Series he earned the save by inducing Brooklyn Dodgers hitter Eddie Miksis to hit into a series-ending double play.

In 1948, Page finished second in the American League in saves. He also struck out 77 in 107.2 innings, pitched in the All-Star game for the third time, and led the league with 55 appearances.

The following season, Page had a 13–8 record and a 2.59 ERA. He finished first in the American League in saves with 27, again with no fanfare at the time because the save was not a recognized baseball statistic. He gave up 103 hits in 135.1 innings and struck out 99 batters. He was again named to play in the All-Star Game, and finished first in the league in three categories: games finished, games pitched, and saves. Page won the inaugural Babe Ruth Award for his performance in the 1949 World Series against the Brooklyn Dodgers, winning game three of the Series. He also finished third in the American League MVP voting.

Page struggled during the 1950 season and was not part of the Yankee playoff roster. He was sent to the minors for the 1951 season, and was released on May 16. He spent 1952 in the minors, and was out of baseball altogether in 1953. On April 12, 1954, Page was signed as a free agent by the Pittsburgh Pirates, appearing in seven games, posting an 11.17 ERA. Page was released by the Pirates on June 1, one week after his final appearance.

Page finished his eight-year career in the majors with a career record of 57–49, a 3.53 ERA, 76 saves, and 519 strikeouts in 790.0 innings pitched. Alvin Dark, a player in Page's day and later a big-league manager, credits Page's success as a relief pitcher in bringing greater attention to the role.

Page was a competent hitter for a pitcher, posting a .205 batting average (47-for-229) with 20 runs, 2 home runs and 26 RBI.

== Death ==
An operator of a bar and resident of Laughlintown, Pennsylvania, Page died at Latrobe Hospital on April 21, 1980 at age 62. His funeral was held in New Kensington.

== See also ==
- List of Major League Baseball annual saves leaders

Preceded by None	Babe Ruth Award; 1949	Succeeded by Jerry Coleman
