= 1949 World Series =

1949 Major League Baseball championship series

Team (Wins)	Managers	Season
New York Yankees (4)	Casey Stengel	97–57, .630, GA: 1
Brooklyn Dodgers (1)	Burt Shotton	97–57, .630, GA: 1
- Dates: October 5–9
- Venue(s): Yankee Stadium (New York); Ebbets Field (Brooklyn)
- Umpires: Cal Hubbard (AL), Beans Reardon (NL), Art Passarella (AL), Lou Jorda (NL), Eddie Hurley (AL: outfield only), George Barr (NL: outfield only)
- Hall of Famers: Umpire: Cal Hubbard; Yankees: Casey Stengel (mgr.); Yogi Berra; Joe DiMaggio; Johnny Mize; Phil Rizzuto; Dodgers: Roy Campanella; Gil Hodges; Duke Snider; Pee Wee Reese; Jackie Robinson

Broadcast
- Television: NBC; CBS; ABC; DuMont
- TV announcers: Jim Britt
- Radio: Mutual
- Radio announcers: Mel Allen and Red Barber

The 1949 World Series featured the New York Yankees and Brooklyn Dodgers, with the Yankees winning in five games for their second defeat of the Dodgers in three years, and the 12th championship in team history. This victory started a record run of five straight World Series championships by the Yankees, and was also the first of 14 AL pennants in 16 years (1949–1964 except for 1954 and 1959) for the Yankees.

Both teams finished the regular season with exactly the same records and winning their respective leagues by one game.

With improvements in the then-infant television medium, the broadcast of the World Series could now be seen east of the Mississippi River. For the second consecutive season, the games were open to any channel with an affiliation with one of the national broadcast networks: NBC, CBS, ABC, or DuMont.

== Summary ==
AL New York Yankees (4) vs. NL Brooklyn Dodgers (1)

Game	Date	Score	Location	Time	Attendance
1	October 5	Brooklyn Dodgers – 0, New York Yankees – 1	Yankee Stadium	2:24	66,224
2	October 6	Brooklyn Dodgers – 1, New York Yankees – 0	Yankee Stadium	2:30	70,053
3	October 7	New York Yankees – 4, Brooklyn Dodgers – 3	Ebbets Field	2:30	32,788
4	October 8	New York Yankees – 6, Brooklyn Dodgers – 4	Ebbets Field	2:42	33,934
5	October 9	New York Yankees – 10, Brooklyn Dodgers – 6	Ebbets Field	3:04	33,711

== Matchups ==
=== Game 1 ===
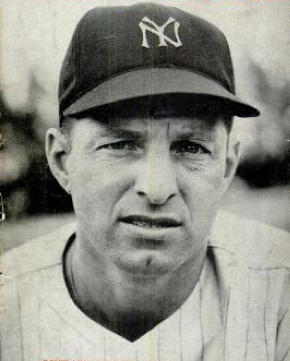
Tommy Henrich

October 5, 1949 1:00 pm (ET) at Yankee Stadium in Bronx, New York
Team	1	2	3	4	5	6	7	8	9	R	H	E
Brooklyn	0	0	0	0	0	0	0	0	0	0	2	0
New York	0	0	0	0	0	0	0	0	1	1	5	1
WP: Allie Reynolds (1–0) LP: Don Newcombe (0–1); Home runs: BRO: None; NYY: Tommy Henrich (1)

Don Newcombe of the Dodgers threw a complete game, five-hitter allowing only one run in a 1–0 losing effort. He struck out 11 Yankees during that game to tie the record for most strikeouts during a World Series game by a losing pitcher. Tommy Henrich led off the bottom of the ninth by tagging Newcombe for the first walk-off home run in World Series history.

=== Game 2 ===
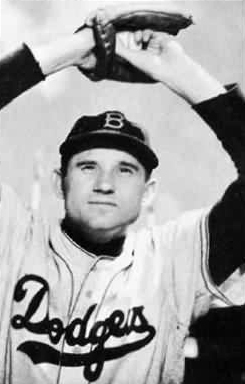
Preacher Roe

October 6, 1949 1:00 pm (ET) at Yankee Stadium in Bronx, New York
Team	1	2	3	4	5	6	7	8	9	R	H	E
Brooklyn	0	1	0	0	0	0	0	0	0	1	7	2
New York	0	0	0	0	0	0	0	0	0	0	6	1
WP: Preacher Roe (1–0) LP: Vic Raschi (0–1)

Preacher Roe pitched a six-hit shutout, getting the only run he needed early when Jackie Robinson doubled and Gil Hodges singled. Yankee Stadium came alive in the ninth with Joe DiMaggio's leadoff hit, but Roe retired the next three Yankees for the win, the second straight 1–0 result of the Series.

Upon the completion of game 2, 1949 became the first World Series to contain multiple 1–0 games, a distinction only matched in 1966.

=== Game 3 ===
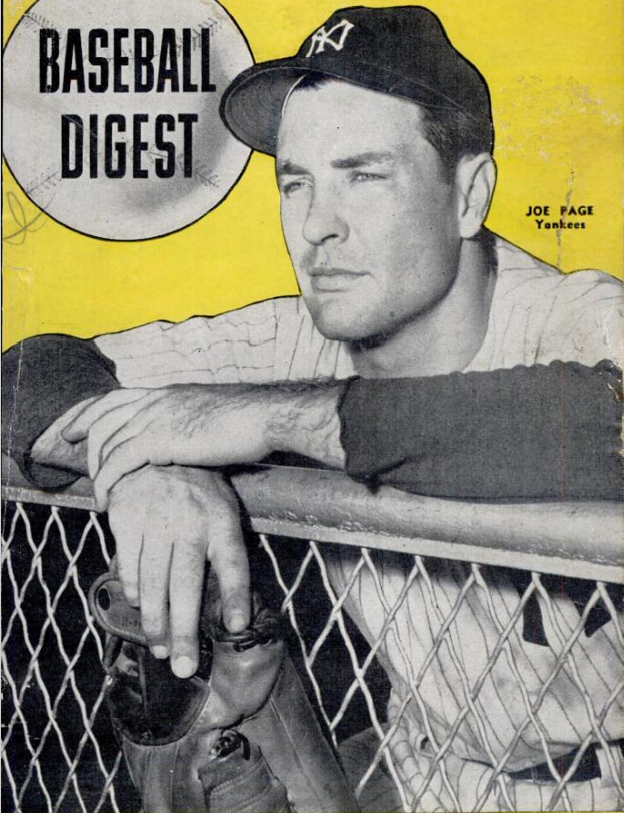
Joe Page

October 7, 1949 1:00 pm (ET) at Ebbets Field in Brooklyn, New York
Team	1	2	3	4	5	6	7	8	9	R	H	E
New York	0	0	1	0	0	0	0	0	3	4	5	0
Brooklyn	0	0	0	1	0	0	0	0	2	3	5	0
WP: Joe Page (1–0) LP: Ralph Branca (0–1); Home runs: NYY: None; BRO: Pee Wee Reese (1), Luis Olmo (1), Roy Campanella (1)

In Game 3, the Yankees struck first in the third on Phil Rizzuto's sacrifice fly with two on off Ralph Branca, but Pee Wee Reese tied the game in the fourth on a home run off Tommy Byrne. In the ninth, two walks and a single loaded the bases with two outs, when Johnny Mize delivered a two-run pinch-hit single to right. Brooklyn starter Ralph Branca was then replaced by Jack Banta, who gave up an RBI single to Jerry Coleman that made it 4–1 Yankees. It seemed safe until Luis Olmo and Roy Campanella homered in the bottom of the ninth, but Joe Page hung on for the win after 5 2/3 innings in relief.

=== Game 4 ===
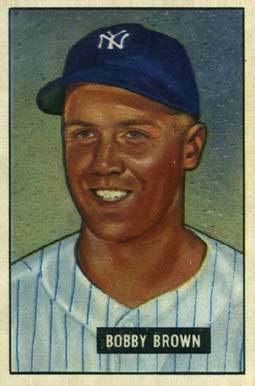
Bobby Brown

October 8, 1949 1:00 pm (ET) at Ebbets Field in Brooklyn, New York
Team	1	2	3	4	5	6	7	8	9	R	H	E
New York	0	0	0	3	3	0	0	0	0	6	10	0
Brooklyn	0	0	0	0	0	4	0	0	0	4	9	1
WP: Eddie Lopat (1–0) LP: Don Newcombe (0–2) Sv: Allie Reynolds (1)

Cliff Mapes broke a 0-0 tie in the fourth inning with a two-run double off Don Newcombe. Yankee pitcher Eddie Lopat aided his own cause with an RBI double, and the advantage ballooned to 6–0 after a bases-loaded Bobby Brown triple scored three more in the fifth off Joe Hatten. Lopat pitched five scoreless innings before allowing two lead-off singles in the sixth. After a double play moved Pee Wee Reese to third, Jackie Robinson's RBI single put the Dodgers on the board. After a Gil Hodges single, RBI singles by Luis Olmo, Roy Campanella, and Gene Hermanski chased Lopat and cheered Ebbets Field's fans, bringing the Dodgers back to within 6–4. After that, though, Allie Reynolds held the home team hitless.

=== Game 5 ===
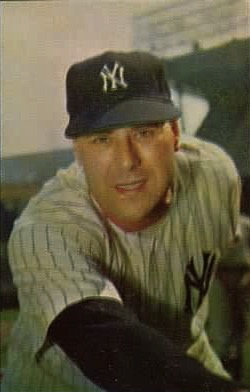
Vic Raschi

October 9, 1949 2:00 pm (ET) at Ebbets Field in Brooklyn, New York
Team	1	2	3	4	5	6	7	8	9	R	H	E
New York	2	0	3	1	1	3	0	0	0	10	11	1
Brooklyn	0	0	1	0	0	1	4	0	0	6	11	2
WP: Vic Raschi (1–1) LP: Rex Barney (0–1) Sv: Joe Page (1); Home runs: NYY: Joe DiMaggio (1); BRO: Gil Hodges (1)

A shaky start by Rex Barney. proved costly for Brooklyn. In the first, the Yankees loaded the bases on two walks and an error before Joe DiMaggio's sacrifice fly and Bobby Brown's RBI single put them up 2–0. In the third, the Yankees again loaded the bases on two walks and a single before a Jerry Coleman two-run single knocked Barney out of the game. Vic Raschi's RBI single off Jack Banta made it 5–0 Yankees. The Dodgers got on the board in the bottom half off Raschi when Roy Campanella doubled and scored on Pee Wee Reese's single, but the Yankees got that run back with a Joe DiMaggio home run in the fourth. Next inning, Gene Woodling hit a leadoff double and scored on two groundouts. In the sixth, after a walk and single off Carl Erskine, Yogi Berra's sacrifice fly made it 8–1 Yankees, then after a pop out, a Bobby Brown RBI triple aided by an error that allowed Brown himself to score extended their lead to 10–1. The Dodgers got a run in the bottom half on Gene Hermanski's RBI single after a double and walk. Next inning, after a one-out single and walk, Jackie Robinson's sacrifice fly made it 10–3 Yankees, then after another walk, Gil Hodges's three-run home run cut their lead to 10–6. However, Joe Page held the Dodgers scoreless for the rest of the game to give the Yankees the title.

History was made in the ninth inning when the Ebbets Field lights were turned on, making this the first World Series game finished under artificial lights. The first scheduled Series night game would not be held until 1971.

== Composite box ==
1949 World Series (4–1): New York Yankees (A.L.) over Brooklyn Dodgers (N.L.)

Team	1	2	3	4	5	6	7	8	9	R	H	E
New York Yankees	2	0	4	4	4	3	0	0	4	21	37	3
Brooklyn Dodgers	0	1	1	1	0	5	4	0	2	14	34	5
Total attendance: 236,710 Average attendance: 47,342; Winning player's share: $5,627 Losing player's share: $4,273

== See also ==
- Subway Series / Dodgers-Yankees rivalry
