= Bill Bevens =

American baseball player (1916-1991)

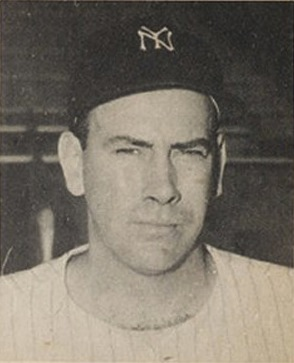
- Pitcher
- Born: October 21, 1916; Hubbard, Oregon, U.S.
- Died: October 26, 1991 (aged 75); Salem, Oregon, U.S.
- Batted: Right Threw: Right

MLB debut
- May 12, 1944, for the New York Yankees

Last MLB appearance
- October 6, 1947, for the New York Yankees

MLB statistics
- Win–loss record: 40–36
- Earned run average: 3.08
- Strikeouts: 289
- Stats at Baseball Reference

Teams
- New York Yankees (1944–1947)

Career highlights and awards
- World Series champion (1947)

Floyd Clifford "Bill" Bevens (October 21, 1916 – October 26, 1991) was an American professional baseball player. He played in Major League Baseball as a right-handed pitcher for the New York Yankees from 1944 through 1947. Bevens is notable for his performance in Game 4 of the 1947 World Series when he came within one out from throwing what would have been the first no-hitter in World Series history.

== Baseball career ==
Bevens signed with the New York Yankees at 20 in 1937, and spent seven seasons in their minor league system, throwing two no-hitters for the Wenatchee Chiefs before making his major league debut with the Yankees on May 12, 1944 at the age of 27.

In his third minor league season, he pitched his first no-hitter on September 21, 1939, against the Tacoma Tigers, winning 8-0 with the only opposing baserunner reaching on an error, giving his Wenatchee Chiefs their first playoff win after losing the first three games of the series to Tacoma.

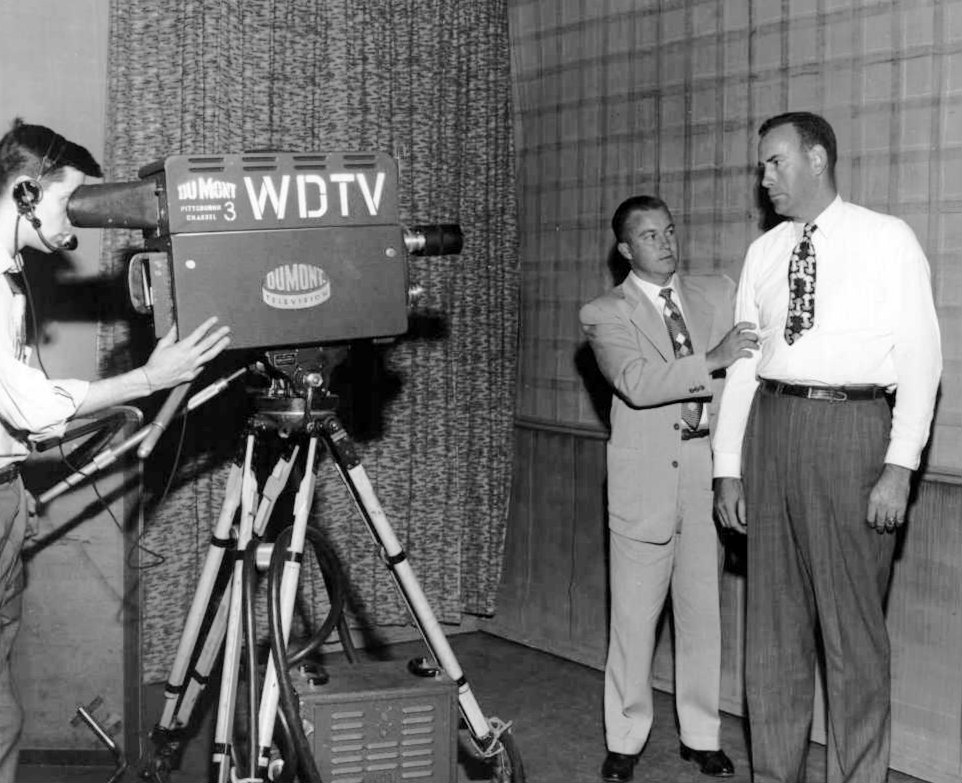
Bill Bevens (right) on the TV show We the People (1952).

Bevens pitched for four years in the Yankees' minor league farm system before they brought him up to the majors, where he attained a career record of 40–36 with a 3.08 earned run average. His best year was 1946, when he went 16–13 and 2.23. However, in the 1947 season, his last year in the majors, he won only seven and lost 13.

For 8 2/3 innings in Game 4 of the 1947 World Series Bevens had held the Dodgers hitless despite giving up a World Series record ten walks. The Yankees were nursing a 2–1 lead, with Brooklyn having scored their run in the 5th on two walks, a sacrifice play, and a ground out. With one out to go for the first no-hitter in Series history, he walked right fielder Carl Furillo and then got to a 3-1 count on pinch-hitter Pete Reiser before being told to intentionally walk him. Dodger manager Burt Shotton sent in Al Gionfriddo to pinch-run for Furillo and Eddie Miksis for the injury-slowed Reiser, and aging Cookie Lavagetto to pinch-hit for leadoff man Eddie Stanky. With two outs and two on in the bottom of the ninth, Lavagetto swung and missed for strike one, but on Bevens' second (and last) pitch, he lined a double off the right field wall, scoring both runners and winning the game for the Dodgers 3-2 with their only hit.

On October 6, Bevens returned to the mound for 2 2/3 innings of scoreless early relief in the deciding Game 7, helping the Yankees to win the world championship. It was the last major league game for the thirty-year-old Bevens.

I do not use anything odd or unorthodox. I have a sinker, but it is a natural delivery. Fast ball, curve, change, and change in speeds. That is my repertoire.
– Bill Bevens in Baseball Magazine (June 1947, Daniel M. Daniel)

Bevens later stated that his arm went dead during the World Series and did not get better over the next couple of years. He eventually landed another major league job with the Cincinnati Reds in 1952, but was sold to the Triple-A Pacific Coast League San Francisco Seals before he could see any action for the Reds. He finished his career with the Salem Senators in 1953 at the age of 35. He retired to raise his family, working at a local cannery before becoming a manager of a trucking company. To the day he died, he received mail asking about the game and an autograph, with no apparent bitterness.

== Death ==
Bevens died of lymphoma on October 26, 1991, five days after his 75th birthday. He was interred in Restlawn Memory Gardens, Salem, Oregon.
