= RUG =

RUG or Rug may refer to:

- Rug, a small carpet
- Ghent University, formerly State University of Ghent (Rijksuniversiteit Gent, RUG), in Belgium
- University of Groningen (Rijksuniversiteit Groningen, RUG), in the Netherlands
- Really Useful Group, a company set up by Andrew Lloyd Webber
- Rugby railway station, England, station code RUG
- Rug, a slang term for a toupée
- Rug pull
