= Allie Reynolds =

Native American baseball player (1917–1994)

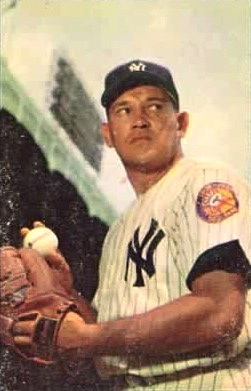
- Reynolds, c. 1953
- Pitcher
- Born: February 10, 1917; Bethany, Oklahoma, U.S.
- Died: December 26, 1994 (aged 77); Oklahoma City, Oklahoma, U.S.
- Batted: Right Threw: Right

MLB debut
- September 17, 1942, for the Cleveland Indians

Last MLB appearance
- September 25, 1954, for the New York Yankees

MLB statistics
- Win–loss record: 182–107
- Earned run average: 3.30
- Strikeouts: 1,423
- Stats at Baseball Reference

Teams
- Cleveland Indians (1942–1946); New York Yankees (1947–1954)

Career highlights and awards
- 6× All-Star (1945, 1949, 1950, 1952–1954); 6× World Series champion (1947, 1949–1953); AL ERA leader (1952); 2× AL strikeout leader (1943, 1952); Pitched two no-hitters; Monument Park honoree

Allie Pierce Reynolds (February 10, 1917 – December 26, 1994) was an American professional baseball pitcher in Major League Baseball (MLB). Reynolds pitched in MLB for the Cleveland Indians (1942–1946) and New York Yankees (1947–1954). A member of the Muscogee Nation, Reynolds was nicknamed "Superchief".

Reynolds attended Capitol Hill High School and the Oklahoma Agricultural & Mechanical College (A&M), where he was a multi-sport athlete. Henry Iba, baseball coach of the Oklahoma A&M baseball team, discovered Reynolds while he was practicing his javelin throws. After excelling at baseball and American football at Oklahoma A&M, Reynolds chose to turn professional in baseball.

In his MLB career, Reynolds had a 182–107 win–loss record, 3.30 earned run average, and 1,423 strikeouts. Reynolds was a six-time MLB All-Star (1945, 1949, 1950, 1952, 1953, 1954) and six-time World Series champion (1947, 1949, 1950, 1951, 1952, 1953). He won the Hickok Belt in 1951 as the top American professional athlete of the year. He has also received consideration for induction into the National Baseball Hall of Fame, though he has not been elected.

== Early years ==
Reynolds was born on February 10, 1917, in Bethany, Oklahoma. His father was a preacher in the Church of the Nazarene. His father, Dave Reynolds, was a member of the Muscogee (Creek) Nation and he also became enrolled. As a young child, he did not play baseball because his father did not approve of playing sports on Sundays. Reynolds threatened to run away from home if his father wouldn't let him play football; his father relented. Reynolds attended Capitol Hill High School in Oklahoma City, where he starred in American football as a quarterback and running back, and at track and field, where he excelled at the javelin throw and 100-yard dash. He played fast-pitch softball for his father's church team, which did not play on Sundays. There, he began dating Dale Earleane Jones, who was named Capitol Hill High School's most outstanding female athlete; she had previously dated Reynolds's younger brother. The couple married on July 7, 1935.

Oklahoma Agricultural & Mechanical College (A&M) provided Reynolds a scholarship to attend and participate in track. Reynolds also played on the football team. He majored in education and graduated with a lifetime certification to teach public school in Oklahoma. Henry Iba, coach of the baseball team, first noticed Reynolds when he was practicing his javelin throws. Iba asked Reynolds to throw batting practice while his pitchers recovered from sore arms. Without taking any warmup pitches, Reynolds struck out the first four batters without any making contact. Reynolds was the team's captain playing as an outfielder–pitcher during his senior year in 1938, and he led the team to victory in the state conference baseball championship. Reynolds was drafted by the New York Giants of the National Football League as a halfback. Since Reynolds preferred baseball to football, and believed he could earn more money playing baseball, he chose not to sign.

== Professional career ==
=== Minor leagues (1939–1942) ===
Iba was friends with Hugh Alexander, a scout who worked for the Cleveland Indians. After Iba recommended Reynolds, the Indians signed Reynolds as an amateur free agent for a $1,000 signing bonus ($23,146 in current dollar terms). He was assigned to the Springfield Indians of the Class-C Middle Atlantic League. In 1940, he pitched for the Cedar Rapids Raiders of the Class-B Illinois–Indiana–Iowa League. Reynolds played right field for the Raiders when he wasn't pitching, as roster sizes were reduced to 17 as a result of the Great Depression. The Indians wanted to convert Reynolds to catcher due to his athleticism, but Reynolds refused to change positions.

Reynolds started the 1941 season with the Wilkes-Barre Barons of the Class-A Eastern League, but was demoted to Cedar Rapids after three appearances. Becoming increasingly homesick and not wanting to spend his entire professional career in the minor leagues, Reynolds considered retiring after the 1942 season if he did not get promoted to the majors. In 1942, Reynolds went 18–7 with a 1.56 earned run average (ERA), 11 shutouts, 21 complete games, and 193 strikeouts in 231 innings pitched, earning a promotion to the major leagues to finish the 1942 season.

=== Cleveland Indians (1942–1946) ===
Reynolds appeared in his first major league game on September 17, 1942, making two relief appearances for the Indians that season. With ace Bob Feller serving in the military during World War II, the Indians hoped that Reynolds would star for the Indians. Reynolds took a pre-enlistment physical, but due to his family and football injuries, he did not enlist in the military and was not eligible to be drafted.

Reynolds began the 1943 season as a relief pitcher, making his first start on June 20. Indians player-manager Lou Boudreau used Reynolds as a reliever in between starts due to his resiliency. Reynolds led the American League (AL) in strikeouts in 1943 with 151 and hits allowed per nine innings pitched with 6.34; however, he was third in walks allowed with 109. Reynolds led the AL in walks with 130 in 1945.

During his five years with the Indians he was primarily used as a starting pitcher, although he did display the versatility that would become his hallmark. He pitched in 139 games for the Indians, starting 100 and finishing 27. Early evidence of his versatility is demonstrated by his 41 complete games, 9 shutouts and 8 saves.

=== New York Yankees (1947–1954) ===
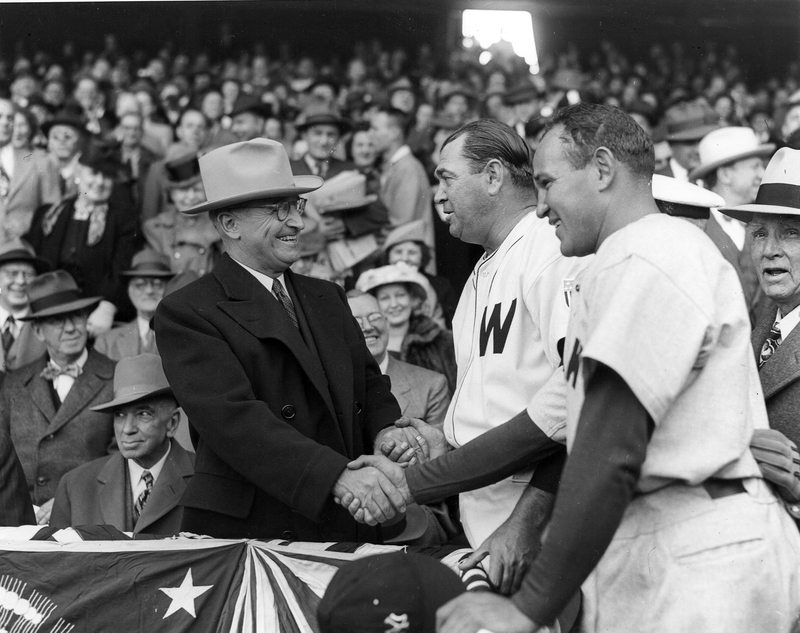
Reynolds (right) with the New York Yankees shaking hands with Harry S. Truman before Opening Day at Griffith Stadium in 1947

On October 11, 1946, the Indians traded Reynolds to the New York Yankees for second baseman Joe Gordon. A possible trade was speculated throughout the 1946 season. The Yankees had a wealth of infield talent, but needed pitching help. The Indians were managed by player-manager Lou Boudreau, who played shortstop, but they needed help at second base. Cleveland wanted Gordon and offered the Yankees any pitcher on their staff, with the exception of Bob Feller. Yankee executive Larry MacPhail discussed the potential trade with Yankees star Joe DiMaggio. Though MacPhail initially wanted Red Embree, DiMaggio replied: "Take Reynolds. I'm a fastball hitter, but he can buzz his hard one by me any time he has a mind to."

Reynolds promptly became the Yankees' best pitcher, recording the highest winning percentage in the AL in his first season as a Yankee. In 1949, joined by Vic Raschi and Eddie Lopat, he was a star of a Yankee team that won the first of five consecutive league championships, a feat that had never been achieved before. He played many important roles for those teams. In his first six years with the Yankees he averaged over 232 innings, 17.5 wins, and 14 complete games. As a swingman, he averaged 26 games started and 9 games finished per season.

"Reynolds was two ways great, which is starting and relieving, which no one can do like him. ... He has guts and his courage is simply tremendous."

— Manager Casey Stengel

In 1950, Reynolds won 16 games, even though he pitched with bone chips in his elbow for the entire season. His remarkable 1951 season began under very difficult conditions. Floating chips in his elbow prevented him from throwing a single pitch in spring training. He was resigned to having surgery which would have cost him at least half of the season. Dr. George Bennett of Johns Hopkins University recommended against surgery. Reynolds appeared in his first game one week after the season started.

On July 12 and September 28, 1951, Reynolds threw no-hitters. He was the first American League pitcher to throw two no-hitters in a season and only the second player to do so in baseball history, after Johnny Vander Meer threw consecutive no-hitters in 1938. This is still the major league record for most no-hitters in a single season, a record that he and Vander Meer share with Virgil Trucks (1952), Nolan Ryan (1973), Roy Halladay (2010), and Max Scherzer (2015).

His first no-hitter, on July 12, 1951, was a 1–0 defeat of his former team, the Indians. Gene Woodling's solo home run was the only run scored during the game. Reynolds retired the last 17 Indians he faced. Only four Indians reached base; he walked three and Bobby Ávila reached on an error by Phil Rizzuto. It was his third shutout of Cleveland that season. Bob Feller also threw a strong game and didn't allow a hit until the sixth inning, when Mickey Mantle doubled. Feller threw a complete game and allowed only four hits. Feller had thrown a no-hitter eleven days earlier.

His second no-hitter, on September 28, 1951, was an 8–0 defeat of the Boston Red Sox which allowed the Yankees to clinch at least a tie of the American League pennant. The Yankees clinched the pennant in the second half of the September 28 double-header. Reynolds struck out nine hitters. He walked four, but "not one Boston batter seemed close to getting a hit". With two outs in the ninth inning, Ted Williams hit a pop fly to Yankees catcher Yogi Berra. Berra dropped the ball and prolonged the at bat against the dangerous Williams. Reynolds remained calm, telling Berra, "Don't worry Yogi, we'll get him again." Reynolds was correct and Williams once again popped up, but Berra caught this one. In the spring of 1953, Stengel made Reynolds predominantly a reliever, although he notched 15 starts and 5 complete games, because of Reynolds' ability to pitch without much rest and to use his blazing fastball late in the Yankees' afternoon games when the shadows crept over the mound. However, Reynolds injured his back in July when the team bus was on the way to the train station after a game in Philadelphia—robbing Reynolds of his control. During the '53 World Series—his final one—Reynolds started the opener at home and struggled because of his back injury, but recovered to appear in two more as a reliever—winning the sixth and final game of the Series.

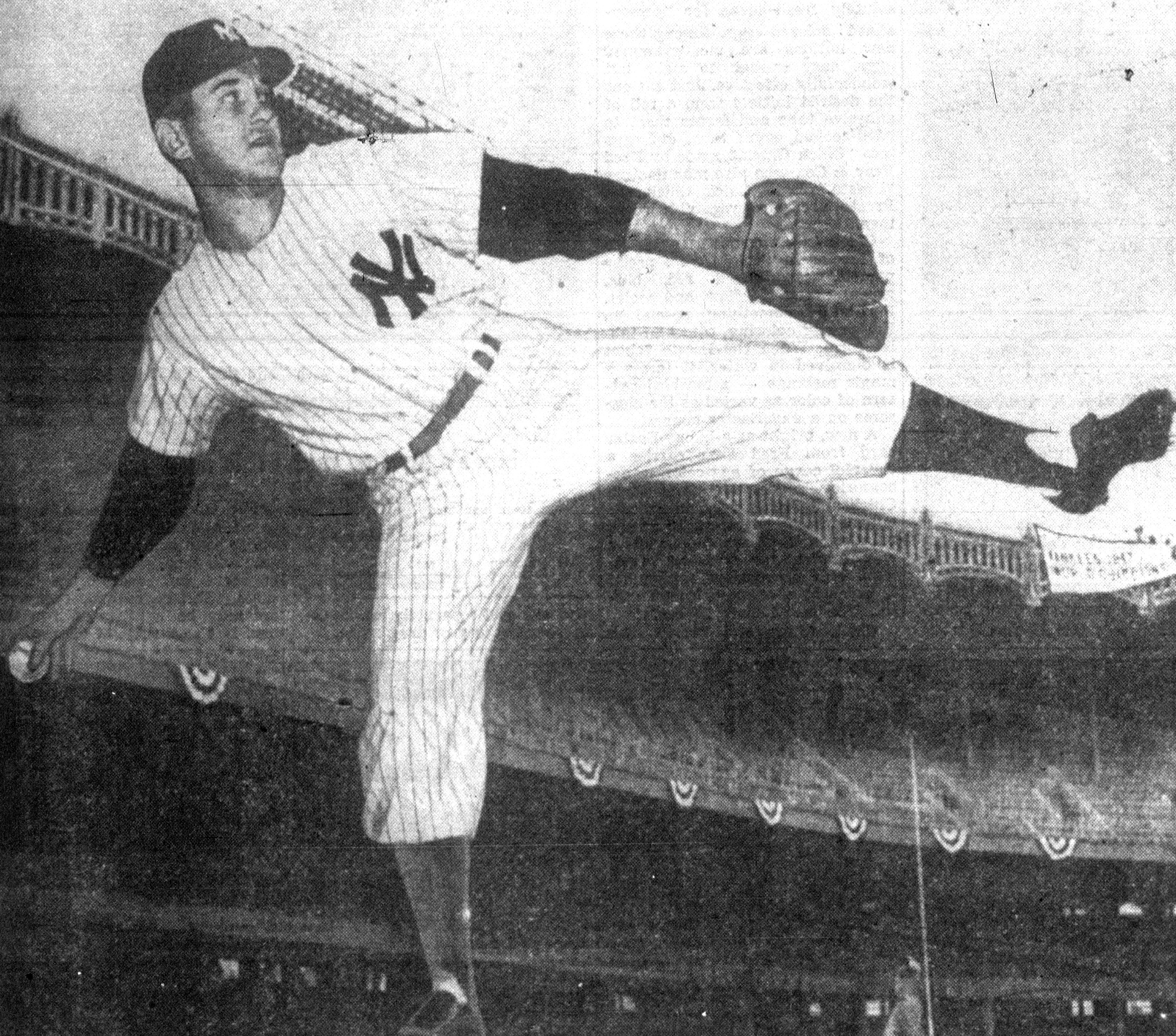
Reynolds, c. 1951

Reynolds led the AL in shutouts in 1951 with seven. In 1952, he had his greatest single season performance. He won twenty games for the only time in his career (against eight losses). He led the American League in earned run average (2.06), strikeouts (160), and shutouts (6). He also saved six games.

He also played in the MLB All-Star Games of 1949, 50, 52, 53, and 54 (no official All-Star selection or game was held in 1945). With the Yankees, Reynolds reached the World Series in 1947, 1949, 1950, 1951, 1952, and 1953. Reynolds had a 7–2 record with a 2.79 ERA over 77 innings in the World Series. He made six relief appearances in the World Series, recording a win or save in each of them, including the clinching games of the 1950, 1952 and 1953 series. He also batted .308 in 26 at-bats in his World Series appearances.

Reynolds won the Hickok Belt as the top professional athlete of the year in 1951. He also was voted the Player Of Year in 1951 by the New York chapter of the Baseball Writers' Association of America, and finished third in voting for the AL Most Valuable Player Award, behind Berra and Ned Garver of the St. Louis Browns. In 1952, he was the MVP runner-up to Bobby Shantz of the Philadelphia Athletics.

Reynolds suffered a back injury when the Yankees' charter bus crashed into an overpass in Philadelphia during the 1953 season. He retired after the following season as a result of the injury.

== Nickname ==
David Dupree explained a common view of how he was given the nickname, Superchief, "he was part Creek Indian and always in command on the pitching mound." At this time it was very common for baseball players with Native American heritage to be called 'Chief'. Jeffrey Powers-Beck explains that in the early half of the 20th century, "it appeared virtually impossible for a baseball player of admitted native origin to be known popularly as anything but "Chief".

Former teammate and American League President Bobby Brown noted his heritage and a popular railroad influenced the baseball media to use the nickname, "But for some of you too young to remember, the Santa Fe Railroad at that time had a crack train (called the Super Chief) that ran from California to Chicago, and it was known for its elegance, its power and its speed. We always felt the name applied to Allie for the same reasons."

Brown notes that Reynolds was not comfortable with the nickname because of the importance of the 'chief' title. He also explained that his teammates called him Chief. "When we talked with him, we called him Allie... But when he wasn't in the room, he was referred to as the Chief, because we felt he was the one at the top, the real leader."

== Honors ==
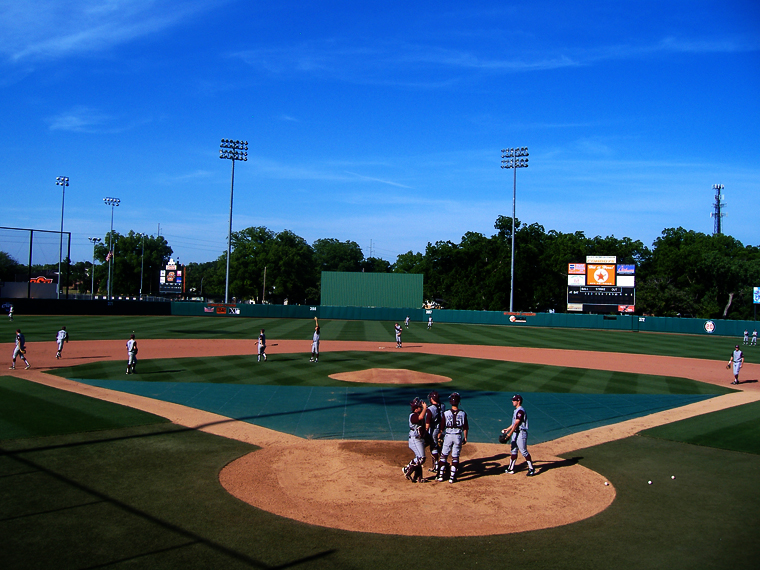
Allie P. Reynolds Stadium in Stillwater, Oklahoma, home of the Oklahoma State Cowboys

The Yankees dedicated a plaque in Reynolds' honor, to hang in Monument Park at Yankee Stadium on August 26, 1989. Reynolds was inducted into the Oklahoma Sports Hall of Fame in 1986 and into the Oklahoma Hall of Fame in 1991. Oklahoma State renamed their baseball stadium after Reynolds.

In 1993, Reynolds received the Jim Thorpe Lifetime Achievement Award from the Jim Thorpe Association. The association established the "Allie P. Reynolds Award" in 1998. It is presented annually to the Oklahoma "high school senior who best reflects the spirit of Allie Reynolds by maintaining the highest standards in scholarship, leadership, civic contributions and character".

=== Baseball Hall of Fame candidacy ===
When Reynolds was eligible for election to the National Baseball Hall of Fame by the Baseball Writers' Association of America, his highest vote percentage was 33.6% in the 1968 balloting, short of the 75 percent required for election. That year, he finished ahead of future Hall of Famers Arky Vaughan, Pee Wee Reese, Phil Rizzuto, George Kell, Hal Newhouser, Bob Lemon, and Bobby Doerr.

Reynolds was named as one of the ten former players that began their careers before 1943 to be considered by the Hall of Fame's Veterans Committee for induction into the National Baseball Hall of Fame in 2009. He received eight votes, one shy of the nine votes required for election. Reynolds was on the new Golden Era Committee ballot in 2011 for 2012, (replaced the Veterans Committee) receiving fewer than three votes (12 votes are required for election to the Hall of Fame). The Committee meets and votes every three years on ten candidates selected from the 1947 to 1972 era. He was not a candidate in 2014 (none were elected by the committee).

Rob Neyer, in evaluating Reynolds' candidacy, believes Reynolds was "probably as good" as Jesse Haines, Lefty Gomez and Waite Hoyt, who have all been inducted into the Hall of Fame. However, he added that "they're all marginals." Adapting Bill James' sabermetric statistic known as win shares, Dr. Michael Hoban, a professor emeritus of mathematics at City University of New York, found that Reynolds falls short of his threshold for induction, and scored lower than Haines and Gomez.

On November 5, 2021, he was selected to the final ballot for the Baseball Hall of Fame's Early Days Committee for consideration in the Class of 2022. He received six of the necessary twelve votes.

== Post-playing career ==
Reynolds became a successful oil businessman after his playing career. He began investing in oil wells during his playing career.

Despite retiring, Reynolds was allowed to remain a member of the Major League Baseball Players Association. He served as the American League player representative in the negotiations with owners to create the players' pension plan. He later sued administrators of the pension plan in federal court for "whittling away" the rights of retired players.

In 1969, Reynolds was named the President of the American Association, a Class AAA baseball league. The Association had been dormant for the previous six years. Reynolds served as president until 1971, when he resigned to spend more time with his family and due to competing business interests. He was also the President of the National Hall of Fame for Famous American Indians in Anadarko, Oklahoma, from 1978 until his death.

Reynolds died in Oklahoma City due to complications of lymphoma and diabetes. He was survived by a son, a daughter, eight grandchildren and ten great-grandchildren.

== See also ==
Achievements
Preceded by Bob Feller; Allie Reynolds	No-hitter pitcher July 12, 1951; September 28, 1951	Succeeded by Allie Reynolds; Virgil Trucks
