= Cookie Lavagetto =

American baseball player and manager (1912–1990)

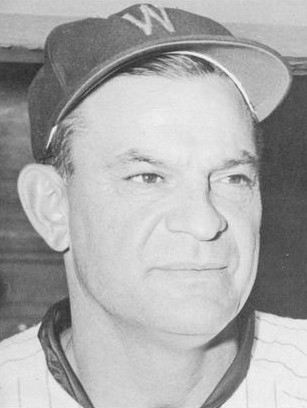
- Lavagetto in 1959
- Third baseman / Second baseman / Manager
- Born: December 1, 1912; Oakland, California, U.S.
- Died: August 10, 1990 (aged 77); Orinda, California, U.S.
- Batted: Right Threw: Right

MLB debut
- April 17, 1934, for the Pittsburgh Pirates

Last MLB appearance
- September 28, 1947, for the Brooklyn Dodgers

MLB statistics
- Batting average: .269
- Home runs: 40
- Runs batted in: 486
- Managerial record: 271–384
- Winning %: .414
- Stats at Baseball Reference

Teams
- As player: Pittsburgh Pirates (1934–1936); Brooklyn Dodgers (1937–1941, 1946–1947); As manager: Washington Senators / Minnesota Twins (1957–1961)

Career highlights and awards
- 4× All-Star (1938–1941)

Harry Arthur "Cookie" Lavagetto (December 1, 1912 – August 10, 1990) was an American professional baseball player, coach, and manager. He played in Major League Baseball (MLB) as a third baseman from 1934 to 1947.

Lavagetto started his major league career with the Pittsburgh Pirates in 1934. After the 1936 season, he was traded to the Brooklyn Dodgers and was a National League (NL) All-Star from 1938 to 1941. He then missed four full seasons due to World War II service in the United States Navy. He returned to the Dodgers and finished his MLB career with them in 1946 and 1947.

Lavagetto is best-known for his performance in game four of the 1947 World Series, when he drove home the winning run with a double while New York Yankees pitcher Bill Bevens was one out away from throwing what would have been the first no-hitter in World Series history.

After his playing career ended, Lavagetto became a coach. He was the last manager of the American League's first Washington Senators franchise, from 1957 through 1960, and the first manager of the Minnesota Twins when the Senators relocated there for the 1961 season.

== Early playing career ==
Lavagetto, the son of a trash hauler, was born in Oakland, California, in 1912.

Lavagetto started his professional baseball career with the Oakland Oaks of the Pacific Coast League in 1933. A 6 ft (1.8 m), 170 lb (77 kg) right-handed batter and thrower, he was nicknamed "Cookie" after the Oaks general manager Cookie Devincenzi.

In September 1933, Lavagetto was traded to the National League's Pittsburgh Pirates. He was a part-time player for the Pirates from 1934 to 1936, never playing more than 87 games in a season.

== Brooklyn Dodgers ==
In December 1936, the Pirates traded Lavagetto to the Brooklyn Dodgers. He was a full-time player for the Dodgers from 1937 to 1941 and made the NL All-Star team four straight years from 1938 to 1941.

Among Lavagetto's best seasons was 1939, when he set career-highs with 153 games played, a .300 batting average, 10 home runs, 93 runs scored, and 87 runs batted in (RBI); his 87 RBI ranked sixth in the league. On September 23 of that year, he went 6-for-6 in the second game of a doubleheader in a 22–4 win over the Philadelphia Phillies.

Lavagetto helped the Dodgers win the 1941 NL championship and played in his first World Series, which the Dodgers lost to the New York Yankees. He then joined the United States Navy during World War II and missed the next four seasons from 1942 to 1945. After the war ended, Lavagetto rejoined the Dodgers and spent the 1946 and 1947 seasons with them as a part-time player.

The Dodgers won the 1947 NL pennant and again faced the Yankees in the World Series. In game four, played on October 3 at Ebbets Field, Yankees pitcher Bill Bevens had a no-hitter with two outs in the bottom of the ninth inning and was ahead 2–1. No one had ever pitched a no-hitter in a World Series before. However, two runners were on base from Bevens' ninth and tenth walks of the game. Lavagetto was then summoned by Dodgers manager Burt Shotton to pinch-hit for Eddie Stanky. With no balls and one strike, Lavagetto cracked an opposite-field double off the right field wall to break up the no-hitter and score the two Dodger runners (pinch runners Al Gionfriddo and Eddie Miksis) to win the game for Brooklyn, 3–2. Lavagetto was the first player to end a World Series game with a hit when his team was one out away from losing the game; the only other players to ever accomplish that feat were Kirk Gibson in 1988 and Brett Phillips in 2020. Lavagetto's game-winning double tied the series at two games apiece. It ended up being Lavagetto's only hit of the series and his last as a major league player. The Yankees defeated the Dodgers in seven games.

In May 1948, the Dodgers released Lavagetto. He finished his MLB career with a .269 batting average, 945 hits, 183 doubles, 37 triples, 40 home runs, 487 runs scored, and 486 RBI in 1,043 games played.

In the 2001 book The New Bill James Historical Baseball Abstract, writer Bill James ranked Lavagetto as the 92nd greatest third baseman in baseball history.

== Major league coach ==
Lavagetto returned to Oakland and finished his playing career with the Oaks (1948–1950), where he was a mentor to a young Billy Martin. When Oakland manager Chuck Dressen was named the field leader of the Dodgers in 1951, Lavagetto accompanied him and returned to Brooklyn as one of his coaches. He was an aide to Dressen with Brooklyn (1951–1953) and the Pacific Coast League Oaks (1954), and followed him a third time as a member of the coaching staff when Dressen became manager of the Washington Senators in 1955.

== Manager of the Senators/Twins ==
On May 7, 1957, with the Senators in last place, Dressen was fired and Lavagetto named as his successor. The team improved slightly, but finished last in 1957, 1958, and 1959. Finally, in 1960, Lavagetto's Senators rose to fifth place in the eight-team American League. The club featured promising young players such as Harmon Killebrew, Jim Kaat, Earl Battey, and Bob Allison, as well as veteran pitcher Camilo Pascual, just entering his prime. However, the Senators' encouraging 1960 season came too late to keep the franchise in Washington; owner Calvin Griffith moved the club to Minneapolis–Saint Paul, where it became the Minnesota Twins in 1961.

Lavagetto was the first manager in Twins history, but he did not finish the 1961 season. With the Twins mired in ninth place in the new ten-team AL, he took a seven-game leave of absence on June 5 and then returned to the helm on the 13th, but was fired on June 23 with the club still in ninth place. He was replaced by coach Sam Mele, under whom the Twins became pennant contenders in 1962 (finishing in second place to the Yankees) and pennant winners in 1965. Lavagetto, as manager for the so-called "Griffs", won 271 games and lost 384 (.414).

== Later life ==
Lavagetto then returned to the coaching ranks with the expansion team New York Mets for their first two seasons starting in 1962 before moving back to the Bay Area with the San Francisco Giants in 1964 before leaving baseball after the end of the 1967 season.

Lavagetto died in his sleep at his home in Orinda, California, in 1990 at the age of 77.

== See also ==
- List of Major League Baseball single-game hits leaders
