= Vic Raschi =

American baseball player (1919–1988)

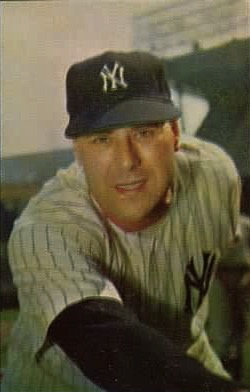
- Raschi in 1953
- Pitcher
- Born: March 28, 1919; West Springfield, Massachusetts, U.S.
- Died: October 14, 1988 (aged 69); Groveland, New York, U.S.
- Batted: Right Threw: Right

MLB debut
- September 23, 1946, for the New York Yankees

Last MLB appearance
- September 13, 1955, for the Kansas City Athletics

MLB statistics
- Win–loss record: 132–66
- Earned run average: 3.72
- Strikeouts: 944
- Stats at Baseball Reference

Teams
- New York Yankees (1946–1953); St. Louis Cardinals (1954–1955); Kansas City Athletics (1955)

Career highlights and awards
- 4× All-Star (1948–1950, 1952); 6× World Series champion (1947, 1949–1953); AL strikeout leader (1951)

Victor John Angelo Raschi (March 28, 1919 – October 14, 1988) was an American Major League Baseball pitcher. Nicknamed "the Springfield Rifle", he was one of the top pitchers for the New York Yankees in the late 1940s and early 1950s, forming (with Allie Reynolds and Eddie Lopat) the "Big Three" of the Yankees' pitching staff. He also pitched for the St. Louis Cardinals and the Kansas City Athletics.

From 1946 to 1953, Raschi won 120 games for the Yankees while losing 50, a .706 winning percentage. He pitched in three straight All-Star Games from 1948 to 1950, and a fourth in 1952. Raschi led the American League (AL) in won/lost percentage in 1950 (.724) and in strikeouts in 1951 (164). From 1949 through 1951, he won exactly 21 games a year, ranking second in the AL in wins in 1950 and 1951. After pitching in relief for the Yankees in the 1947 World Series, Raschi won five World Series in a row with the ballclub from 1949 to 1953, pitching a shutout in Game 1 of the 1950 World Series. Later in his career, as a pitcher with the Cardinals, he allowed Hank Aaron's first MLB career hit and first MLB career home run. In the remaining two years of his career, with the Cardinals and Athletics, Raschi won only 12 games while losing 16.

== Early life ==
Born March 28, 1919, in West Springfield, Massachusetts, Victor John Angelo Raschi was one of four children of Massimino and Eugizia Raschi. Massimino worked for a local railroad as a carpenter, and the family moved to Springfield when Raschi was just an infant. At Springfield Tech High School, Raschi excelled in baseball, football, and basketball. Gene McCann, a scout for the New York Yankees became interested in him as a high school freshman, but Raschi wished to attend college upon graduating. The Yankees decided to pay for him to go to college in return for the first chance to sign him. In 1938, he started attending the College of William and Mary. Before he graduated, the Yankees had him begin pitching minor league baseball for them in 1941, though Raschi would continue to take classes at William and Mary during his offseasons.

== Minor league career and military service ==
Raschi started his professional career with the Amsterdam Rugmakers of the Class C Canadian–American League in 1941. Making 17 appearances for them, he posted a 10–6 record in 142 innings pitched. His 3.68 earned run average (ERA) ranked fourth in the league among pitchers who worked at least 140 innings. He also appeared in 17 games in 1942 for the Class B Norfolk Tars of the Piedmont League, working 113 innings. Though he posted a 4–10 record, his ERA was 2.71, which Lawrence Baldassaro of the Society for American Baseball Research called "impressive." However, Raschi's career was placed on hold with the onset of World War II.

For the next three years, Raschi served in the United States Army Air Corps as a physical education instructor. The war also forced him to postpone his college studies. He returned to baseball in 1946 with the Binghamton Triplets of the Class A Eastern League. He had a 10–10 record for them, posting a 3.16 ERA and finishing second in the league with 160 strikeouts (behind Bob Kuzava's 207). Later in the year, he appeared in five games for the Newark Bears of the Class AAA International League, posting a 1–2 record. In September, he was promoted to the Yankees for the first time.

== New York Yankees (1946–1953) ==
=== 1946 ===
Raschi's debut for New York came on September 23, 1946. Facing the Philadelphia Athletics, he struck out eight and allowed six runs, but the Yankees scored nine, giving him the win. He made one other start six days later, also a complete game against the Athletics, in which he allowed one run in a two-run triumph in Game 2 of a doubleheader.

=== 1947 ===
Hoping to remain with the Yankees for 1947, Raschi was very disappointed when he was sent to the Class AAA Portland Beavers of the Pacific Coast League to start the season. He initially refused to report, but when he finally did join the team, manager Jim Turner helped him become a better pitcher. With Portland, Raschi posted an 8–2 record and a 2.75 ERA in 85 innings pitched.

In July, an injury to Spud Chandler and the trade of Mel Queen left the Yankees in need of a pitcher for a July 13 doubleheader. Yankee manager Bucky Harris phoned Turner on the 10th, and after Raschi made a start in San Diego that evening, Turner asked him if he could be ready to pitch again three days later. Raschi agreed, then found out his next start would be for the Yankees. Pitching the second game of the doubleheader, he gave up three runs in 6 1/3 innings as the Yankees defeated the Chicago White Sox by a score of 6–4. On July 18, he allowed six hits in a complete game, 7–2 victory over the Cleveland Indians, the last of a 19-game winning streak for New York. Facing the Indians again in the second game of an August 7 doubleheader, he threw a three-hit shutout. He won his first six decisions of 1947 before suffering his first loss in a game that biographer Lawrence Baldassaro called "one of his best outings of the year." For 10 innings, he held the Boston Red Sox (the previous year's American League (AL) pennant winners) scoreless, but the Yankees also failed to score, and Raschi took the loss when he allowed three runs in the 11th. On September 14, he defeated the St. Louis Browns; the win meant the Yankees would at least tie for the AL pennant. In 15 games (14 starts), he had a 7–2 record, a 3.87 ERA, 51 strikeouts, 38 walks, and 89 hits allowed in 104 2/3 innings for the pennant-winning Yankees. He pitched twice in relief in the 1947 World Series against the Brooklyn Dodgers, allowing two hits and a run in 1/3 of an inning in Game 3 and throwing a scoreless inning in Game 6. Both were losses, but the Yankees defeated Brooklyn in seven games, making Raschi a World Series champion for the first time.

=== 1948 ===
Raschi started the 1948 season with the Yankees; after losing his first start, he won nine decisions in a row. He shut out Philadelphia on May 14, allowing just three hits. On June 2, he threw a shutout against the Detroit Tigers, singling against Art Houtteman and scoring the only run of the game when Johnny Lindell drove him in with a double. He threw a second consecutive shutout in Game 2 of a doubleheader against the Browns on June 6, holding St. Louis to three hits. Selected to his first All-Star Game in 1948, Raschi earned the win after pitching three scoreless innings and driving in the winning run with a two-RBI single against Johnny Schmitz. Facing the Indians on August 7, he threw a four-hit shutout in front of 66,693 fans at Cleveland Stadium in a game that drew the Yankees within half a game of the AL lead. He was 17–5 with a 3.31 ERA after holding the Athletics to four hits in a shutout on August 22, but he posted an ERA of 6.00 in his final 11 games as the Yankees finished in third place. Raschi had a 19–8 record and a 3.84 ERA, ranking among the AL leaders in wins (tied with Bob Feller for fourth), winning percentage (.704, third, behind Jack Kramer's .783 and Gene Bearden's .741), strikeouts (124, fifth), and shutouts (six, tied for second with Bearden behind Feller's 10). He finished 11th in AL Most Valuable Player (MVP) voting.

=== 1949 ===
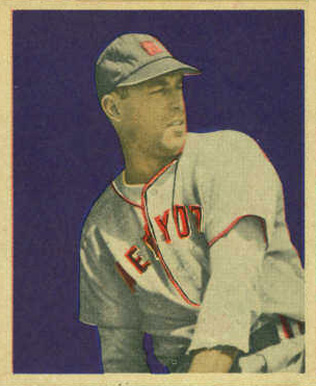
1949 Bowman card of Raschi with the Yankees

Facing the Washington Senators in his first start of 1949 on April 20, Raschi held them to three hits in a 3–0 victory. On May 18, Raschi allowed just two hits in a shutout of the defending champion Indians. Against the White Sox on June 1, he limited Chicago to three hits in a 3–0 shutout victory. At midseason, he was selected to the All-Star Game, throwing three scoreless innings in the AL's 11–7 win. He was 15–3 with a 2.55 ERA through July 21, but he went 2–6 over his next 10 games, posting a 5.58 ERA from that date through the end of August. On August 4, he pitched 11 innings against the Tigers, allowing three runs in 3–2 loss. He had a 3.30 ERA in September, though, losing once in five decisions. In 1949, the pennant race between the Yankees and the Red Sox came down to the final day of the season, October 2 at Yankee Stadium. Pitching for New York, Raschi held the Red Sox scoreless for eight innings, clinging to a one-run lead until the Yankees scored four runs in the eighth. He gave up three runs in the ninth but persevered, retiring Birdie Tebbetts on a pop fly to end the game as the Yankees prevailed by a score of 5–3. Thirty-nine years later, this game was considered by pitching coach Turner to be his favorite of Raschi's performances. Raschi went 21–10 in 1949, finishing among the AL leaders in wins (fourth, behind Mel Parnell's 25, Ellis Kinder's 23, and Bob Lemon's 22), winning percentage (.677, eighth), ERA (3.34, eighth), and strikeouts (124, sixth). He led the AL with 37 starts. For the second year in a row, he finished 11th in AL MVP voting.

Against the Dodgers in the 1949 World Series, Raschi made two starts. He threw a complete Game 2, with an RBI single by Gil Hodges accounting for the only run. However, the Yankees lost 1–0. Manager Casey Stengel said afterwards, "Raschi pitched a good game; good enough to win if we got some runs." Raschi allowed six runs over 6 2/3 innings in Game 5 but earned the win, clinching the series victory for the Yankees. "It would have been nice to be around at the finish," Raschi said, "but I have no complaints as long as we won. That's the important thing."

=== 1950 ===
An arm injury suffered on May 13, 1950, caused Raschi to miss a few days, but he returned on May 22 to pitch a complete game five-hitter against the Indians as the Yankees won 5–2, continuing a seven-game winning streak. In the first game of a June 11 doubleheader, he held the Browns to three hits in a 1–0 victory. He started the All-Star Game for the first time in 1950, allowing two runs in three innings, though he got a no decision in the AL's 4–3 loss. Facing Feller on August 4, he pitched a three-hit shutout in a 1–0 victory over the Indians, as 66,743 fans turned out to see the night game at Cleveland Stadium. Five days later, he had a perfect game going against the Red Sox until Billy Goodman got a single with two outs in the seventh; Raschi held Boston to three hits and one run in a 2–1 victory. After losing on August 13, Raschi never lost a game again during the regular season, winning each of his next six starts and eight of 10 games overall. On August 29, he hit his first career home run (a three-run shot against Early Wynn), then pitched all 10 innings of a 6–5 victory over the Indians. In one of the August games against Cleveland, he collided with Indians catcher Jim Hegan at home plate, tearing cartilage in his right knee. The Yankees kept the injury a secret, as the injury limited Raschi's range; after the 1951 season, he would have surgery to remove the cartilage. He finished 1950 with a 21–8 record and a 4.00 ERA, leading the AL in winning percentage (.724), ranking second in wins (21, two behind Lemon for the lead), and ranking third in strikeouts (155, behind Lemon's 170 and teammate Allie Reynolds's 160). In MVP voting, he finished seventh.

With the Yankees AL champions again, Stengel picked Raschi to start Game 1 of the World Series against the Philadelphia Phillies. During the first inning, he injured his knee while fielding a bunt off the bat of Richie Ashburn and almost had to leave the game, but the knee stopped hurting, allowing him to finish. He did not allow a hit until the fifth inning and allowed just two in a 1–0 shutout of the Phillies. "I mixed [my pitches] up pretty good," Raschi described his performance. "Feeling the way I did, I went along using sliders and fast balls, but it was my fast ball that won for me." It was his only start of the series, which New York won four games to none.

=== 1951 ===
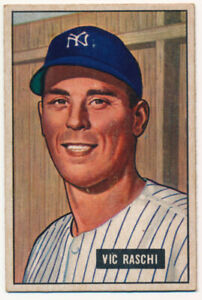
1951 Bowman card of Raschi with the Yankees

In 1951, Raschi made the first of three straight Opening Day starts for the Yankees. "The excitement before an opening game is as great, I think, as the World Series," he later recalled, emphasizing the importance of getting the season started well. He started the season with a six-hit shutout of the Red Sox. In May, he won six straight starts. Included in the streak were a 10-strikeout performance against the Indians (May 16) and a five-hit shutout of the Browns (May 21). On June 8, Raschi held the Chicago White Sox to seven hits in a 4–2 victory, ending their six-game win streak in a game that set a Comiskey Park attendance record at the time with 53,490 spectators. Exactly a week later, he held the Tigers to three hits in a 2–0 shutout. He limited the Red Sox to three hits on June 29 in a 2–1 triumph. Despite a 12–6 record at the All-Star break, Raschi was not selected to the All-Star Game, partly because the AL owners decreed that only one pitcher could be selected from each team. In the first game of a doubleheader on July 29, he struck out 12 White Sox and pitched into the ninth inning, earning the win in an 8–3 victory. Facing the Senators in the second game of a September 9 doubleheader, he pitched a one-hit shutout, though the game lasted only six innings. Raschi finished the year with a 21–10 record. He led the AL in strikeouts (164), finishing second in wins (tied with teammate Eddie Lopat behind Feller's 22), fourth in winning percentage (.677, behind Feller's .733, Lopat's .700, and Reynolds's .680), second in shutouts (four, tied with Feller and Lopat behind Reynolds's seven), and eighth in ERA (3.27). The Yankees again won the AL pennant, and Raschi finished eighth in AL MVP voting.

Facing the New York Giants in Game 3 of the World Series, Raschi lasted just 4 1/3 innings, taking the loss in a 6–2 defeat. He allowed all six Giant runs, but only one was earned because of two fifth inning errors: shortstop Phil Rizzuto had a ball kicked out of his hand by Eddie Stanky, and catcher Yogi Berra dropped a ball thrown to him. Another error (a passed ball allowed by Berra) led to all the scoring against Raschi in Game 6 as the Giants only picked up one run against him in six innings. Johnny Sain and Kuzava finished the game for the Yankees, and Raschi earned the win in the 4–3 triumph that clinched the series for the Yankees. Hall of Famer Monte Irvin, who played for the Giants, thought that Raschi was one of the best pitchers he had ever seen.

=== 1952 ===
Raschi's received a $40,000 contract for the 1952 season, making him at the time the highest-paid pitcher in Yankee history. On April 16, 1952, Raschi allowed just two hits in an 8–1 victory over the Athletics, though he was removed from the game in the ninth inning after walking three batters. He pitched back-to-back shutouts against the Browns and the Indians on June 8 (doubleheader, second game) and June 14, striking out 13 against the Browns. The starter in that year's All-Star Game, he allowed one run in two innings, taking a no decision in the AL's 3–2 loss. Against the Tigers in the first game of a July 13 doubleheader, Raschi was four outs away from throwing a no hitter when Joe Ginsberg hit a home run off him. Ginsberg's blast was the only hit for the Tigers as the Yankees won 11–1. In an important July 17 doubleheader against the Indians, who were fighting the Yankees for the pennant in 1952, Raschi pitched a complete Game 2, allowing four runs in a 5–4 victory. On August 4, he allowed just six hits and struck out eight in a 1–0 shutout victory over the Senators. He threw a six-hit shutout in a 1–0 victory over the Indians on August 23 in front of the largest crowd at Yankee Stadium up to that point in the season, a total of 53,747 fans. In 31 starts, Raschi had a 16–6 record. He ranked among the AL's leaders in wins (sixth), winning percentage (.727, second to Bobby Shantz's .774), ERA (2.78, eighth), strikeouts (127, ninth), and shutouts (four, tied with Early Wynn and Billy Pierce for fifth). Of AL MVP candidates, he ranked 17th in the voting.

As the Yankees had won the AL pennant again, Raschi played in the World Series against the Dodgers, where he made two starts and a relief appearance. He was a little wild in Game 2, walking five batters, but he only allowed three hits and one earned run as the Yankees defeated the Dodgers by a score of 7–1. He hit an RBI single off of Billy Loes' leg in Game 6 and held the Dodgers to two runs before getting removed as he tired with two outs in the eighth inning, but Reynolds finished off the 3–2 victory. In Game 7, he entered in the seventh inning with the Yankees clinging to a 4–2 lead, but still tired, he retired only one hitter while allowing the Dodgers to load the bases. Bob Kuzava bailed him out, however, and the Yankees won their fourth straight World Series.

=== 1953 ===
Despite a 3–3 record in his first 10 games of 1953, Raschi posted a 5.05 ERA; some of his early starts were "not too impressive," according to sportswriter John Drebinger. In front of 74,708 fans in Cleveland on June 14 in the second game of a doubleheader, he allowed just three hits in a shutout of the Indians. Raschi had what sportswriter Louis Effrat called a "magnificent pitching performance" on July 2, allowing three runs while pitching all 10 innings of a 5–3 victory over the Red Sox, a win that snapped a nine-game losing streak for the Yankees. He pitched a two-hit shutout in Chicago against the White Sox on July 19, in the second game of a doubleheader that broke the Comiskey Park attendance record, as 54,215 fans bought tickets. On August 4, Raschi recorded seven RBI against the Tigers with a two-RBI single in the second inning, a three-RBI double in the third, and a two-RBI single in the fourth in a 15–0 victory. The seven RBI set what remains an AL record for a pitcher in a game, and they were a major league record for pitchers until Tony Cloninger drove in nine runs on July 3, 1966. After the game, the Yankees stuffed Raschi's locker with bats as a tribute. He threw back-to-back shutouts on August 16 (doubleheader, first game) and 23, both against the Athletics. From June 14 through the rest of the season, he had a 2.54 ERA. In 28 games (26 starts), he had a 13–6 record and 76 strikeouts. He ranked among the AL leaders in winning percentage (.684, fifth) and ERA (3.33, ninth).

For the fourth time in his career, Raschi and the Yankees faced the Dodgers in the World Series. In Game 3, he and opposing pitcher Preacher Roe allowed their opponents just two runs until the eighth inning, when Raschi gave up a solo home run to Roy Campanella that made the difference in a 3–2 score. "It wasn't quite a strike, but I just didn't get it quite high enough, and Campy belted it," he said of the home run pitch. Raschi made no further appearances in the series but became a World Series champion for the sixth time and fifth year in a row as the Yankees defeated the Dodgers in six games.

In 1954, the Yankees tried to cut Raschi's salary by 25%. The pitcher held out in spring training, seeking more money, but so did 11 other Yankees. Wanting the holdouts to accept his offers, general manager George Weiss decided that one needed to go. He also was trying to develop a younger ballclub and planned to trade either Raschi or Reynolds. On February 24, 1954, Raschi was traded to the St. Louis Cardinals for $85,000. He found out about the trade from a photographer, and the only notification he had from the Yankees was a telegram. "It's baseball, I guess," he told reporters about the trade. "What hurts me most is leaving the team-mates I've grown so fond of." From 1946 to 1953, he had won 120 games while losing 50, a .706 winning percentage.

== St. Louis Cardinals (1954–1955) and Kansas City Athletics (1955) ==
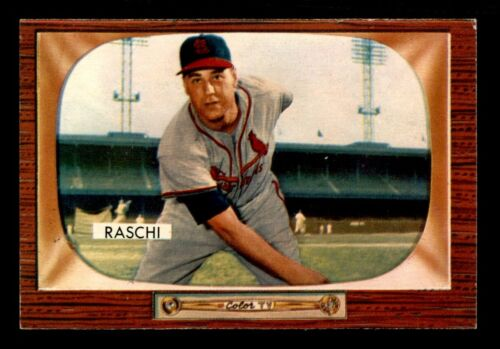
1955 Bowman card of Raschi with the Cardinals

With the Cardinals, Raschi got off to a 5–0 start, not losing until June. In a game against the Milwaukee Braves on April 15, he allowed Hank Aaron's first hit, a double. Eight days later, he gave up the first home run to Aaron, who would go on to set an MLB record with 755 career home runs. On May 19, he pitched a five-hit shutout in a 3–0 victory over the Giants. After that game, however, he won just once in 12 games (11 starts) through July 18. He threw another shutout against the Giants on July 29, allowing just three hits this time. The victory moved his record to 8–5, but Raschi lost his four remaining decisions. In 30 games (29 starts), he had an 8–9 record, a 4.73 ERA, and 73 strikeouts in 179 innings pitched.

Back trouble afflicted Raschi in 1955; Red Smith wrote in April, "Raschi's back feels like a hollow tooth." He was unable to pitch for much of the spring, drawing reports that he might be released, until he finally solidified his spot on the roster with a five-inning performance at the end of spring training. After he failed to get through the second inning in his first start of the regular season, on April 18, the Cardinals released him on April 19.

On April 26, Raschi signed with the Athletics, who had moved from Philadelphia to Kansas City after the previous season. He posted a 7.33 ERA in his first six games with them, failing to pitch more than six innings. On June 11, he pitched a complete game, striking out six and allowing one run in a 2–1 victory over the Baltimore Orioles. In his first game against the Yankees since his departure, on July 22, Raschi held the Yankees to one run over eight innings, earning the win in a 3–1 victory that temporarily knocked them out of first place in the AL. He held the Yankees to two runs over seven innings in his next start but took a no decision in a 3–2 loss. After defeating the Red Sox on August 5, he had a 4–4 record with a 4.59 ERA. However, Raschi failed to complete five innings in any of his remaining starts, losing three times and posting an ERA of 11.34. In 20 games (18 starts) for Kansas City, he had a 4–6 record, a 5.42 ERA, and 38 strikeouts in 101 1/3 innings pitched. The Athletics released him after the season.

== Career statistics and uniform numbers ==
In 269 games (255 starts), Raschi had a 132–66 record, a 3.72 ERA, 944 strikeouts, and 26 shutouts in 1,819 innings. He recorded a .977 fielding percentage, committing only 8 errors in 351 total chances. Offensively, he had a .184 career batting average and 50 RBI. He had 11 RBI apiece in 1948 and 1953.

Raschi wore uniform number 12 in his first two games for the Yankees. The next year, he wore three different numbers (17, 19, and 43), settling with number 17 in succeeding seasons. He kept his uniform number 17 on the Cardinals, but on the Athletics, he wore number 16.

== Pitching style ==
Raschi's best pitch was his speedy fastball. He was nicknamed "The Springfield Rifle," a reference both to the pitch and to the Springfield Armory located near his boyhood home. Turner recalled, "He had good control for a power pitcher." In addition to the fastball, Raschi threw a changeup and a slider, which The New York Times called "effective." Under his dark eyebrows, his eyes would stare intently at opponents before he threw pitches. "I figured if I could break their concentration when they came up to the plate I had them beat, or at least gained an advantage. Once you made them turn their eyes away you had a slight psychological edge." "He’d keep his eyes on their eyes, like a boxer before a fight," Berra described the stare.

== Legacy ==
Raschi appeared on the Baseball Hall of Fame ballot nine times, though he received more than 1.8 percent of the vote only twice: 1964 (four percent) and 1975 (10.2 percent, his last year on the ballot). "He was our bread-and-butter guy," said teammate Jerry Coleman. "Allie Reynolds had a better arm, but Raschi was a great competitor. Off the field he was shy and unassuming, nothing like he was on the mound. There he was a beast. Casey considered him our best starter." "I thought Raschi was the best pitcher I had on the team for nine innings. . . . Boy, he was the best on the club in the eighth and ninth inning," Stengel assessed his ability. "If there was only one game I had to win, the man I’d want out there on the mound for me would be Vic Raschi," explained teammate Tommy Henrich. With Reynolds and Lopat, Raschi "was the keystone of one of the most acclaimed pitching staffs in the history of major league baseball," according to reporter Robert Thomas Jr. The "Big Three" won 53 games in 1949, 55 in 1950, and 59 in 1951.

== Personal life, post-retirement ==
Raschi met his future wife, Sally Glen, while both were students at William and Mary. They were married in 1949 and had three children: Victoria, William, and Mitje. Sally earned her degree from William and Mary in 1944. Vic, after returning from the war, took classes from October to February, finally graduating himself in 1949. While Vic played for the Yankees, he and Sally lived in Hillsdale, New Jersey. Following his retirement, they moved to Geneseo, New York. Vic ran the Valley Liquor Store in Geneseo and served as a baseball and basketball coach at Geneseo State Teachers College (now the State University of New York at Geneseo). In 1975, the college dedicated the Victor J. Raschi Baseball Field, which is now used as a softball field. Raschi also taught at a local elementary school starting in 1969. He died on October 14, 1988, in Groveland, New York, of a heart attack.

== See also ==
- List of Major League Baseball annual strikeout leaders
