= Ralph Branca =

American baseball player (1926–2016)

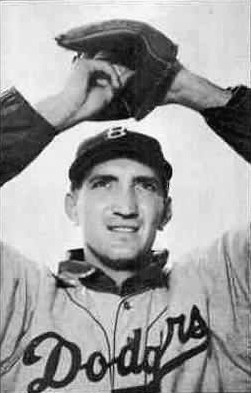
- Branca in 1953
- Pitcher
- Born: January 6, 1926; Mount Vernon, New York, U.S.
- Died: November 23, 2016 (aged 90); Rye Brook, New York, U.S.
- Batted: Right Threw: Right

MLB debut
- June 12, 1944, for the Brooklyn Dodgers

Last MLB appearance
- September 7, 1956, for the Brooklyn Dodgers

MLB statistics
- Win–loss record: 88–68
- Earned run average: 3.79
- Strikeouts: 829
- Stats at Baseball Reference

Teams
- Brooklyn Dodgers (1944–1953); Detroit Tigers (1953–1954); New York Yankees (1954); Brooklyn Dodgers (1956)

Career highlights and awards
- 3× All-Star (1947–1949)

Ralph Theodore Joseph Branca (January 6, 1926 – November 23, 2016), nicknamed "Hawk", was an American professional baseball pitcher who played 12 seasons in Major League Baseball (MLB), from 1944 through 1956. Branca played for the Brooklyn Dodgers (1944–1953, 1956), Detroit Tigers (1953–1954), and New York Yankees (1954). He was a three-time All-Star. In a 1951 playoff, Branca surrendered a walk-off home run to Bobby Thomson of the New York Giants; the game-winning hit was known as the "Shot Heard 'Round the World".

== Early life ==
Ralph Branca was born in Mount Vernon, New York, as the fifteenth of 17 children. His father, John Branca, was a trolley car conductor from Italy. His mother, Kati (née Berger), who was Jewish, immigrated to the United States in 1901 from Sandorf, Hungary (now Prievaly, Slovakia).

His uncle Jozsef Berger died at the Majdanek concentration camp, and his maternal aunt Irma died in Auschwitz concentration camp in 1942. He was raised Roman Catholic.

Branca graduated from A. B. Davis High School and attended New York University (NYU) for one year, before he entered the big leagues. He played college baseball and college basketball for the NYU Violets.

== Career ==
Branca was exempted from military service during World War II, due to his asthma and a punctured eardrum. After Branca attended a tryout with the Brooklyn Dodgers in 1943, the team signed him to a contract. He debuted in the major leagues at age 18 on June 12, 1944, and put up a 3.04 earned run average (ERA) in 109 2/3 innings pitched in his rookie year.

On Opening Day in 1947—which was also Jackie Robinson's major league debut—Branca lined up on the field beside Robinson, while other players refused. That year, he had a 21–12 win–loss record and a 2.67 earned run average (ERA) in 280 innings pitched. He earned his first All-Star appearance and helped the Dodgers win the National League pennant. He was second in the league in wins, innings pitched, and strikeouts (148), third in ERA, and sixth in won-lost percentage (.636). Branca was also the starting pitcher in Game 1 of the 1947 World Series.

A three-time All-Star, Branca won 80 games for the Dodgers with a career-high 21 wins in 1947. In 1948, he was ninth in the league in wins (14) and won–lost percentage (.609). In 1949, he led the National League (NL) in won-lost percentage (.722). In 1951, he was tenth in the NL in ERA (3.26).

In the final game of the best-of-three 1951 National League tie-breaker series at the Polo Grounds against the crosstown rival New York Giants, Branca entered the game in relief of Don Newcombe in the bottom of the ninth inning with one out and Whitey Lockman on second base and pinch runner Clint Hartung on third base and surrendered a walk-off home run, which became known as the "Shot Heard 'Round the World" to Bobby Thomson, giving the Giants the pennant. Prior to facing Thomson, Branca had been warming up in the bullpen with Carl Erskine. Dodgers coach Clyde Sukeforth noticed that Erskine was bouncing several curveballs in the dirt and instructed manager Charlie Dressen to call on Branca—this despite Thomson having homered off Branca in Game 1.

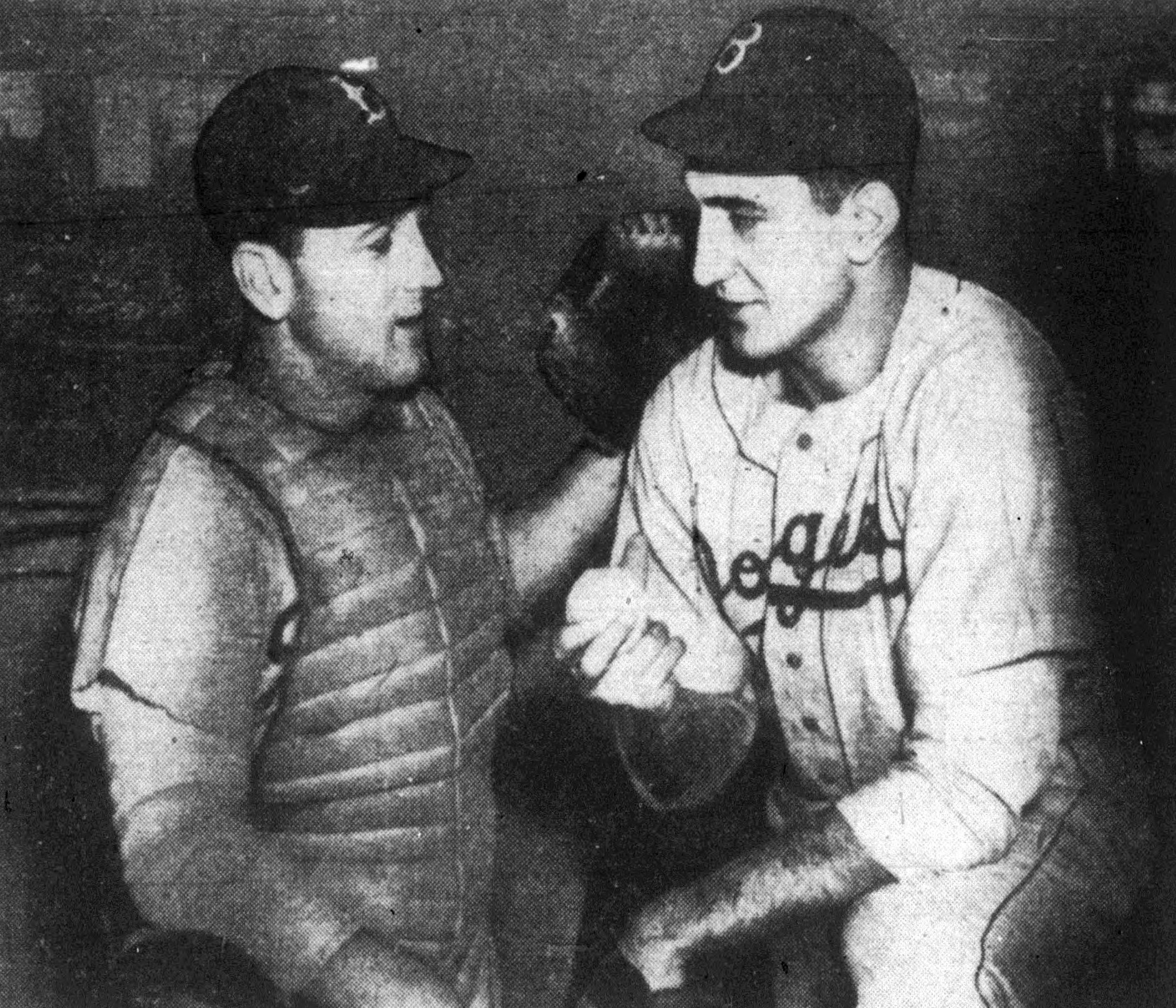
Branca (right) with Brooklyn Dodgers catcher Bruce Edwards (left), circa 1947.

While it has been confirmed that the Giants executed a sign-stealing system, the lone dissenter is Sal Yvars. The rest of the team, including Brooklyn centerfielder Duke Snider, say there was "no playoff larceny" during the 3-game playoff, as the Commissioners Office was present, along with other dignitaries. Al Corwin, another member of the pennant winning Giants, also reminded others that "not many guys relied on it, because that pitcher isn't standing still, he's in the middle of his windup." As the sign stealing was only possible at the Polo Grounds, it would seem improbable. Thomson hit a game-winning home run in the first game at Ebbets Field off Branca. In the second game at the Polo Grounds, rookie Clem Labine pitched a shutout and the Dodgers won 10–0. As the Giants were losing in the top of the 9th, it would seem improbable that any kind of sign stealing was involved. This was all detailed in the HBO documentary 'Shot Heard Round the World'. Many surviving members of the 1951 Giants and Dodgers are interviewed, and Branca was the only one, other than Yvars, who believes Thomson took the sign.

A back injury suffered during spring training in 1952 limited Branca's effectiveness thereafter. Branca appeared in only 12 games for the Dodgers during the 1952 season. In the eighth inning of Game 7 of the 1952 World Series against the New York Yankees, Branca was ejected from the dugout by home plate umpire Larry Goetz for bench jockeying. Branca was only the second player in MLB history to be ejected from a World Series, and the first who was not actually in the game at the time. He did not make an appearance in the series.

Branca began the 1953 season with Brooklyn, but was claimed off waivers by the Detroit Tigers on July 10, 1953. The Tigers released Branca in July 1954. After he pitched batting practice for the Yankees, the Yankees signed him, and used him in five games later in the season. Branca pitched for the Minneapolis Millers in 1955, but was released due to ineffectiveness caused by an arm injury.

In 1956, Branca appeared at Old Timer's Day for the Yankees, believing his career was over. His pitching velocity returned, and he signed with the Dodgers for the last month of the season, making one appearance.

In a 12-year career, Branca posted an 88–68 record with 829 strikeouts and a 3.79 ERA in 1,484 innings pitched.

== Later life ==
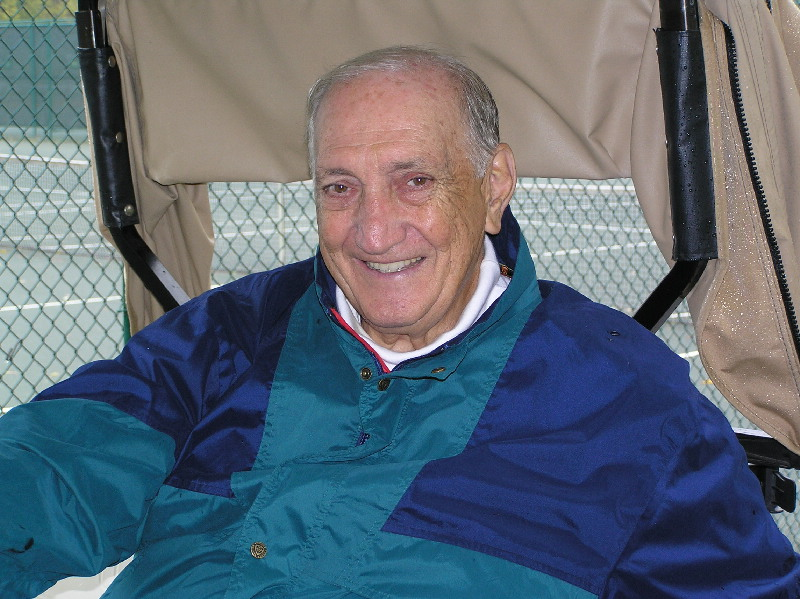
Branca at Westchester Country Club in 2004

Branca became friends with Thomson, a bond that lasted into each man's old age, including joint television and trade show appearances. Branca later learned from Detroit Tiger Ted Gray that the Giants had stolen the signs to the two pitches he threw Thomson. That rumor was confirmed in The Wall Street Journal in 2001, when Giant Sal Yvars admitted that he relayed to Thomson the stolen signs for Branca's fastballs. Joshua Prager detailed the revelations in a book entitled The Echoing Green: The Untold Story of Bobby Thomson, Ralph Branca and The Shot Heard Round the World. Thomson acknowledged to Prager that the Giants had stolen signs in 1951, but denied that he had foreknowledge of the pitch he hit off Branca for the pennant-winning home run. According to Branca, Thomson admitted to accepting the stolen signs during his first three at-bats of that game, but claimed that he did not do so in the final at-bat; Branca indicated that he did not believe Thomson's denials and remained convinced that Thomson was in fact tipped off on the fateful pitch.

Branca ran the Baseball Assistance Team for seventeen years.

Branca was a long time member of Westchester Country Club. He was born and raised in Mt. Vernon, New York where he was a member of the Westchester County Hall of Fame for approximately forty years. He was inducted into the National Italian American Sports Hall of Fame.

Branca was a pallbearer at Jackie Robinson's funeral in October 1972.

Branca was a contestant on Concentration starting in 1963, where he won 17 consecutive games. He appeared in Concentration's 1963 Challenge of Champions.

In the 2012 movie, Parental Guidance, Branca made a cameo appearance as a judge during a scene involving an audition for a music school. During the scene, Billy Crystal's grandson takes to the stage and recites the radio broadcast of, "The Shot Heard Round the World." Branca was portrayed by Hamish Linklater in the 2013 film 42, a biographical sports drama about Robinson's career. Branca was the subject of the 2013 documentary "Branca's Pitch," produced by Andrew J. Muscato.

Branca married Ann Mulvey, whose parents were part-owners of the Dodgers, in 1951, shortly after giving up the famous home run. Their daughter, Mary, married baseball player Bobby Valentine. Their other daughter, Patti, lives in Fort Myers, Florida. Branca released a memoir in 2011, titled A Moment in Time.

On the morning of November 23, 2016, Branca died in a nursing home in Rye Brook, New York, at the age of 90. He was the last living member of the 1947 Dodgers baseball team. Branca was interred in Section 26 of Gate of Heaven Cemetery in suburban Westchester County. His grave is adjacent to Section 25, where Babe Ruth and Billy Martin are interred.

== In popular culture ==
In Don DeLillo's novel "Underworld" the prologue, subtitled The Triumph of Death, details the circumstances of Branca's giving up the game winning home run to Bobby Thompson. The ball is grabbed by Cotter Martin, setting off a complex story arc that ultimately leads to the book's protagonist, Nick Shay.
