= Eddie Miksis =

American baseball player (1926–2005)

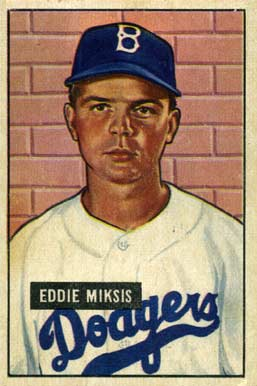
- Infielder / Outfielder
- Born: September 11, 1926; Burlington, New Jersey, U.S.
- Died: April 8, 2005 (aged 78); Huntingdon Valley, Pennsylvania, U.S.
- Batted: Right Threw: Right

MLB debut
- June 17, 1944, for the Brooklyn Dodgers

Last MLB appearance
- September 26, 1958, for the Cincinnati Reds

MLB statistics
- Batting average: .236
- Home runs: 44
- Runs batted in: 228
- Stats at Baseball Reference

Teams
- Brooklyn Dodgers (1944, 1946–1951); Chicago Cubs (1951–1956); St. Louis Cardinals (1957); Baltimore Orioles (1957–1958); Cincinnati Reds (1958)

Edward Thomas Miksis (September 11, 1926 – April 8, 2005) was an American professional baseball infielder and outfielder. He played fourteen seasons in Major League Baseball (MLB) between 1944 and 1958 for the Brooklyn Dodgers, Chicago Cubs, St. Louis Cardinals, Baltimore Orioles, and Cincinnati Reds.

== Playing career ==
Born in Burlington, New Jersey, Miksis played prep baseball at Burlington City High School. He stood 6 ft 0 in (1.83 m) and weighed 185 lbs. Miksis was signed by the Brooklyn Dodgers in 1944 and on June 17, 1944, at the age of 17, he debuted in the Majors and went on to have a 14-year career as a right-handed hitting and throwing utility infielder with the Dodgers (1944–51), Chicago Cubs (1951–56), St. Louis Cardinals (1957), Baltimore Orioles (1957–58) and Cincinnati Reds (1958). In 1,042 games, Miksis hit .236 for his career with 44 home runs and 228 RBI and played all four infield position plus the outfield. Only in four of his fourteen seasons did he play in more than 100 games. Miksis served in the Navy for almost two years during the end of World War II.

He played in both the 1947 World Series and 1949 World Series with the Dodgers, both against the New York Yankees. Miksis batted .273 in eight World Series games.

In Game 4 of the 1947 World Series against the New York Yankees, when Bill Bevens was attempting to complete the first no-hitter in the history of the World Series, Miksis pinch ran for an injured Pete Reiser with two outs in the bottom of the ninth inning. He scored from first base with the winning run on the Dodgers' only hit of the game, Cookie Lavagetto's pinch hit double.

In June of 1951, with the Dodgers leading the National League by 14 1/2 games, Miksis was traded to the Chicago Cubs. His main claim to fame as a Cub was lending his glove to Ernie Banks in Banks' first-ever major league game. Miksis played his final major league game on September 28, 1958, at the age of 32, with the Cincinnati Reds.

== Personal life ==
He was of Lithuanian descent. Miksis died on April 8, 2005, at the age of 78, in Huntingdon Valley, Pennsylvania.
