= Rugger Ardizoia =

Italian baseball player (1919–2015)

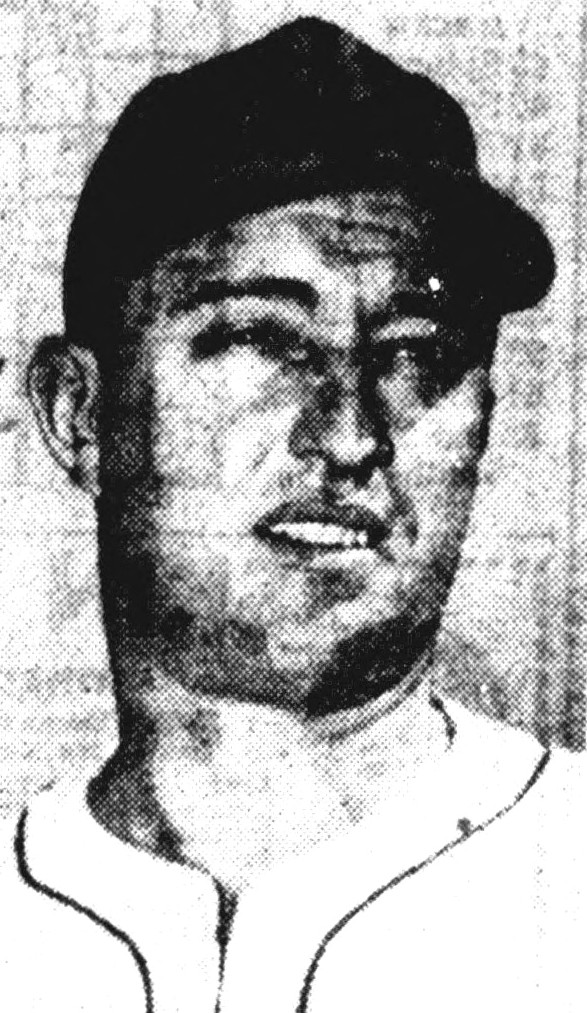
- Ardizoia, circa 1948
- Pitcher
- Born: November 20, 1919; Oleggio, Italy
- Died: July 19, 2015 (aged 95); San Francisco, California, United States
- Batted: Right Threw: Right

MLB debut
- April 30, 1947, for the New York Yankees

Last MLB appearance
- April 30, 1947, for the New York Yankees

MLB statistics
- Win–loss record: 0–0
- Earned run average: 9.00
- Innings pitched: 2
- Stats at Baseball Reference

Teams
- New York Yankees (1947)

Rinaldo Joseph "Rugger" Ardizoia (November 20, 1919 – July 19, 2015) was an Italian born Major League Baseball pitcher. The 5"11", 180 lb. right-hander was one of only seven Italian natives to ever play in the big leagues. He appeared in one game for the New York Yankees in 1947 and, at the time of his death, was the oldest living former member of the team.

== Biography ==
Ardizoia was born in Oleggio, Italy. The 27-year-old rookie took the mound on April 30, 1947, at Sportsman's Park in the bottom of the seventh inning with the Yankees trailing the St. Louis Browns. He pitched two innings for New York and faced a total of 10 batters, giving up four hits, a walk, and two earned runs. The final score was Browns 15, Yankees 5. Ardizoia was credited with a game finished.

Ardizoia's minor league baseball career spanned fifteen seasons, starting in 1937 with the Mission Reds. He missed three seasons while serving in World War II in 1943–45, then played for the Oakland Oaks of the Pacific Coast League in 1946. Following his major league appearance, he returned to the PCL until 1950, then ended his career with the Dallas Eagles of the Texas League in 1951.

Ardizoia died on July 19, 2015, after a stroke suffered one week prior. At the time of his death, he was the oldest living former member of the New York Yankees, as well as the oldest in a group of nearly 1,500 players who have appeared in exactly one Major League game.
