= Al Gionfriddo =

American baseball player (1922–2003)

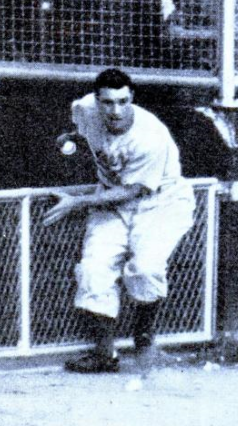
- Gionfriddo making a catch against Joe DiMaggio during the 1947 World Series
- Outfielder
- Born: March 8, 1922; Dysart, Pennsylvania, U.S.
- Died: March 14, 2003 (aged 81); Solvang, California, U.S.
- Batted: Left Threw: Left

MLB debut
- September 23, 1944, for the Pittsburgh Pirates

Last MLB appearance
- September 28, 1947, for the Brooklyn Dodgers

MLB statistics
- Batting average: .266
- Home runs: 2
- Runs batted in: 58
- Stats at Baseball Reference

Teams
- Pittsburgh Pirates (1944–1947); Brooklyn Dodgers (1947)

Albert Francis Gionfriddo (March 8, 1922 – March 14, 2003) was an American professional baseball player who played in Major League Baseball as an outfielder.

== Career ==
Gionfriddo made his major league debut on September 23, 1944 at the age of 22 with the Pittsburgh Pirates. He was a career .266 hitter whose best year was in 1945 when he hit .284 with 9 triples and 74 runs scored for the Pirates. He played in the majors for four years.

He was acquired by the Brooklyn Dodgers from the Pirates midway through the 1947 season, and is most famous for his heroic catch of a drive off the bat of the New York Yankees' Joe DiMaggio in Game 6 of the 1947 World Series. The Dodgers led the Yankees 8–5 going into the bottom of the 6th inning when Gionfriddo was brought in as a defensive replacement. Snuffy Stirnweiss and Yogi Berra were on base when DiMaggio drove the ball to the 415 marker. Gionfriddo raced across the field and caught the ball several steps before crashing into the bullpen gate. DiMaggio shook his head and kicked at the dirt in frustration.

At the time, there was no instant replay, and Gionfriddo was widely believed to have robbed DiMaggio of a home run. However, the game film, when developed later, clearly showed Gionfriddo catching the ball several steps shy of the wall, and thus actually robbing DiMaggio of a double or triple instead of a home run. Still photos of the catch contributed to the misconception that it was a potential home run, since the images showed Gionfriddo with his glove behind the bullpen gate, and the ball inside the glove. However, these photos were taken several seconds after the play, when Gionfriddo's momentum had carried his arm over the gate.

Gionfriddo was also involved in Game 4 of the 1947 Series when Cookie Lavagetto's pinch hit double not only broke up Bill Bevens' no hitter with two outs in the bottom of the ninth inning, but won the game as well when Gionfriddo (who had entered the game as a pinch runner for Carl Furillo and stolen second) and Eddie Miksis scored on the play.

Game 6 of the 1947 World Series proved to be Gionfriddo's swan song in the big leagues—he did not play in Game 7, and he was returned to the minor leagues in 1948. After spending four years with the Dodgers' AAA Montreal Royals and a season with the Class AA Fort Worth Cats, Gionfriddo was given a chance to play for and manage the Drummondville, Quebec Royals of the Class C Provincial League in 1953. Unaffiliated with any major-league club, the Royals finished last, and Gionfriddo was replaced as manager in mid-season. He rejoined the Dodgers organization, playing for their Class B team in Newport News, Virginia. Drifting west, Gionfriddo played three years for teams in the California League, and then spent three years as the General Manager of the Dodgers' Santa Barbara minor league club, before finally retiring from pro baseball after the 1959 season.

== Death ==
Gionfriddo died in Solvang, California, on March 14, 2003, from a heart attack while golfing, at the age of 81. He was interred at Santa Barbara Cemetery.
