= 1943 World Series =

1943 Major League Baseball championship series

Team (Wins)	Managers	Season
New York Yankees (4)	Joe McCarthy	98–56, .636, GA: 13 1/2
St. Louis Cardinals (1)	Billy Southworth	105–49, .682, GA: 18
- Dates: October 5–11
- Venue(s): Yankee Stadium (New York); Sportsman's Park (St. Louis)
- Umpires: Eddie Rommel (AL), Beans Reardon (NL), Joe Rue (AL), Bill Stewart (NL)
- Hall of Famers: Yankees: Joe McCarthy (mgr.); Bill Dickey; Joe DiMaggio (mil.); Joe Gordon; Phil Rizzuto (mil.); Red Ruffing (mil.); Cardinals: Billy Southworth (mgr.); Enos Slaughter (mil.); Stan Musial

Broadcast
- Radio: Mutual
- Radio announcers: Red Barber and Bob Elson

The 1943 World Series was the championship series in Major League Baseball for the 1943 season. The 40th edition of the World Series, it matched the defending champion St. Louis Cardinals against the New York Yankees in a rematch of the 1942 World Series. The Yankees won the series in five games for their tenth championship in 21 seasons. It was Yankees manager Joe McCarthy's final World Series win. This series was also the first to have an accompanying World Series highlight film.

This World Series was scheduled for a 3–4 home team format because of World War II travel restrictions. The format meant there was only one trip between ballparks; if the series had ended in a four-game sweep, there would have been three games in one park and only one in the other.

Also due to wartime conditions, both teams' rosters were depleted. Johnny Beazley, Jimmy Brown, Creepy Crespi, Terry Moore and Enos Slaughter were no longer on the Cardinals' roster. Joe DiMaggio, Phil Rizzuto, Red Ruffing and Buddy Hassett were missing from the Yankees, and Red Rolfe had retired to coach at Dartmouth College.

Cardinals pitchers Howie Pollet, Max Lanier and Mort Cooper ranked 1–2–3 in the National League in ERA in 1943 at 1.75, 1.90 and 2.30, respectively.

== Summary ==
AL New York Yankees (4) vs. NL St. Louis Cardinals (1)

Game	Date	Score	Location	Time	Attendance
1	October 5	St. Louis Cardinals – 2, New York Yankees – 4	Yankee Stadium	2:07	68,676
2	October 6	St. Louis Cardinals – 4, New York Yankees – 3	Yankee Stadium	2:08	68,578
3	October 7	St. Louis Cardinals – 2, New York Yankees – 6	Yankee Stadium	2:10	69,990
4	October 10	New York Yankees – 2, St. Louis Cardinals – 1	Sportsman's Park	2:06	36,196
5	October 11	New York Yankees – 2, St. Louis Cardinals – 0	Sportsman's Park	2:24	33,872

== Matchups ==
=== Game 1 ===
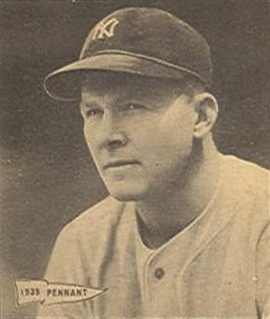
Spud Chandler

Tuesday, October 5, 1943 1:30 pm (ET) at Yankee Stadium in Bronx, New York
Team	1	2	3	4	5	6	7	8	9	R	H	E
St. Louis	0	1	0	0	1	0	0	0	0	2	7	2
New York	0	0	0	2	0	2	0	0	X	4	8	2
WP: Spud Chandler (1–0) LP: Max Lanier (0–1); Home runs: STL: None; NYY: Joe Gordon (1)

In Game 1, the Cardinals took a 1–0 lead in the second inning against Spud Chandler on Marty Marion's RBI double with two on. In the fourth inning, with runners on first and third and no outs off Max Lanier, Charlie Keller's double play tied the game, and then Joe Gordon's home run gave the Yankees a 2–1 lead. The Cardinals tied the game in the fifth inning when Ray Sanders hit a leadoff single, moved to second on an error and scored on Lanier's single. In the sixth inning after two leadoff singles, a one-out wild pitch by Lanier put the Yankees up 3–2, and Bill Dickey added an insurance run with an RBI single. Chandler pitched a complete game to give the Yankees a 1–0 series lead.

=== Game 2 ===
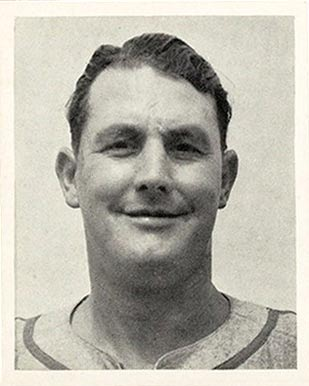
Mort Cooper

Wednesday, October 6, 1943 1:30 pm (ET) at Yankee Stadium in Bronx, New York
Team	1	2	3	4	5	6	7	8	9	R	H	E
St. Louis	0	0	1	3	0	0	0	0	0	4	7	2
New York	0	0	0	1	0	0	0	0	2	3	6	0
WP: Mort Cooper (1–0) LP: Tiny Bonham (0–1); Home runs: STL: Marty Marion (1), Ray Sanders (1); NYY: None

The Cardinals' only victory came on the same day as the death of Mort and Walker Cooper's father. Marty Marion's leadoff home run in the third off Tiny Bonham gave the Cardinals a 1–0 lead. In the fourth, Stan Musial hit a leadoff single, moved to second on a groundout and scored on Whitey Kurowski's RBI single. Ray Sanders's two-run home run increased the lead to 4–0. In the bottom of the inning, Charlie Keller's sacrifice fly with two on off Mort Cooper put the Yankees on the board. In the ninth, Billy Johnson hit a leadoff double and then scored on Cooper's triple. After a lineout, Nick Etten's RBI groundout cut the Cardinals' lead to one, but Cooper coaxed Joe Gordon to pop out in foul territory to end the game and tie the series 1–1.

=== Game 3 ===
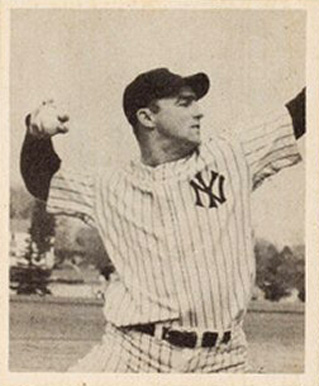
Billy Johnson

Thursday, October 7, 1943 1:30 pm (ET) at Yankee Stadium in Bronx, New York
Team	1	2	3	4	5	6	7	8	9	R	H	E
St. Louis	0	0	0	2	0	0	0	0	0	2	6	4
New York	0	0	0	0	0	1	0	5	X	6	8	0
WP: Hank Borowy (1–0) LP: Al Brazle (0–1) Sv: Johnny Murphy (1)

The Cardinals loaded the bases in the fourth on a single, double and intentional walk off Hank Borowy before Danny Litwhiler drove in two with a single to left, but Borowy allowed no other runs in eight innings. In the sixth, Borowy hit a leadoff double off Al Brazle, moved to third on a sacrifice fly and scored on an error on Billy Johnson's ground ball. In the eighth, the Yankees loaded the bases on a single, fielder's choice and intentional walk before Johnson cleared them with a triple, putting the Yankees ahead 4–2. They added to their lead on RBI singles by Joe Gordon off Howie Krist and Nick Etten off Harry Brecheen. Johnny Murphy pitched a perfect ninth as the Yankees took a 2–1 series lead.

=== Game 4 ===
Sunday, October 10, 1943 1:30 pm (CT) at Sportsman's Park in St. Louis, Missouri
Team	1	2	3	4	5	6	7	8	9	R	H	E
New York	0	0	0	1	0	0	0	1	0	2	6	2
St. Louis	0	0	0	0	0	0	1	0	0	1	7	1
WP: Marius Russo (1–0) LP: Harry Brecheen (0–1)

The Yankees struck first when Joe Gordon doubled with two outs in the fourth off Max Lanier and scored on Bill Dickey's single. In the seventh, Marius Russo recorded two outs but then allowed the Cardinals to load the bases on an error, double and intentional walk before another error on Frank Demaree's ground ball tied the game. In the eighth, Russo hit a leadoff double off Harry Brecheen, moved to third on a sacrifice bunt and scored on Frankie Crosetti's sacrifice fly. Russo pitched a complete game to leave the Yankees one win away from the championship.

=== Game 5 ===
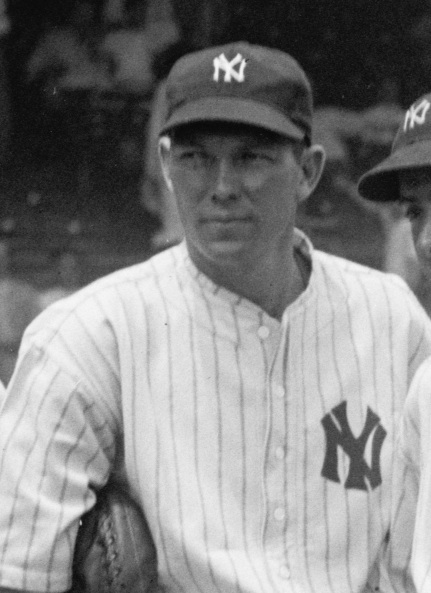
Bill Dickey

Monday, October 11, 1943 1:30 pm (CT) at Sportsman's Park in St. Louis, Missouri
Team	1	2	3	4	5	6	7	8	9	R	H	E
New York	0	0	0	0	0	2	0	0	0	2	7	1
St. Louis	0	0	0	0	0	0	0	0	0	0	10	1
WP: Spud Chandler (2–0) LP: Mort Cooper (1–1); Home runs: NYY: Bill Dickey (1); STL: None

Murry Dickson, who helped close the door for the Cardinals by allowing no hits while on the mound, was on a ten-day pass from the United States Army. Spud Chandler won his second complete game of the series, shutting out the Cardinals despite allowing 10 hits and two walks. Bill Dickey provided the game's only runs on a home run in the sixth after a two-out walk by Mort Cooper.

== Composite box ==
1943 World Series (4–1): New York Yankees (A.L.) over St. Louis Cardinals (N.L.)

Team	1	2	3	4	5	6	7	8	9	R	H	E
New York Yankees	0	0	0	4	0	5	0	6	2	17	35	5
St. Louis Cardinals	0	1	1	5	1	0	1	0	0	9	37	10
Total attendance: 277,312 Average attendance: 55,462; Winning player's share: $6,139 Losing player's share: $4,322

== See also ==
- 1943 Negro World Series
