= Royston, Georgia =

City in Georgia, United States

- City
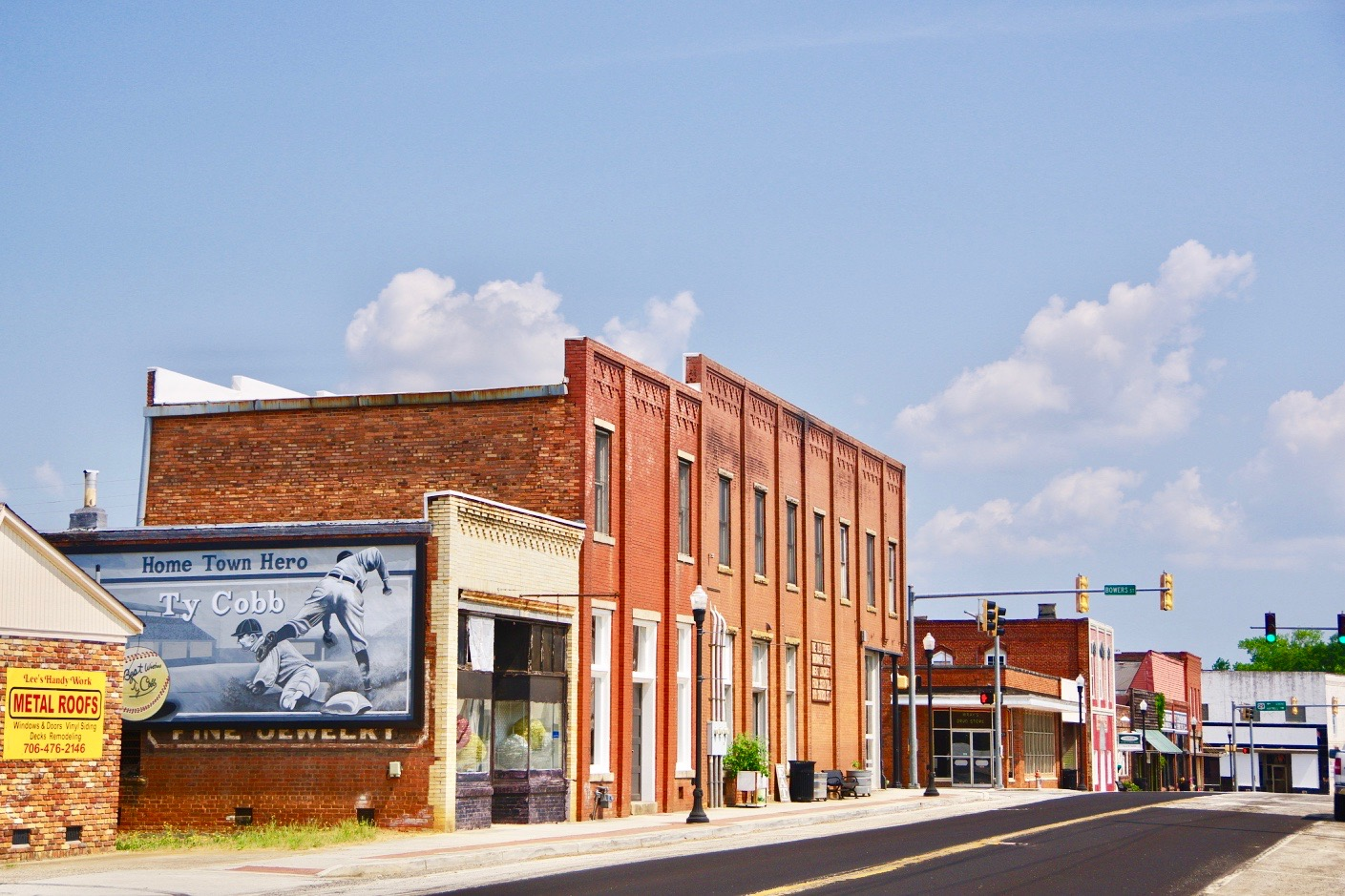
- Church Street (SR 17)

- Flag Seal

- Location in Franklin County and the state of Georgia
- Coordinates: 34°17′8″N 83°6′35″W
- Country: United States
- State: Georgia
- Counties: Franklin, Hart, Madison
- City of Royston: 1879

Government
  - Mayor: Keith Turman
  - City Manager: Pending

Area
  - Total: 3.30 sq mi (8.54 km^{2})
  - Land: 3.28 sq mi (8.50 km^{2})
  - Water: 0.019 sq mi (0.05 km^{2})
- Elevation: 899 ft (274 m)

Population (2020)
  - Total: 2,649
  - Density: 807.5/sq mi (311.78/km^{2})
- Time zone: UTC-5 (Eastern (EST))
  - Summer (DST): UTC-4 (EDT)
- ZIP code: 30662
- Area code: 706
- FIPS code: 13-67452
- GNIS feature ID: 0321981
- Website: cityofroyston.com

Royston is a city in Franklin, Hart, and Madison counties in the U.S. state of Georgia. The population was 2,649 at the 2020 census.

== History ==
A post office called Royston has been in operation since 1878. The community was named after W.A. Royston, a local merchant.

The Georgia General Assembly first incorporated Royston in 1879.

== Geography ==
Royston is located in the southeast corner of Franklin County and the southwest corner of Hart County at 34°17′8″N 83°6′35″W (34.285592, -83.109841). A small portion extends south into Madison County. U.S. Route 29 passes through the center of town, leading northeast 12 miles (19 km) to Hartwell and southwest 30 miles (48 km) to Athens. Georgia State Route 17 leads north from Royston 11 miles (18 km) to Lavonia and southeast 19 miles (31 km) to Elberton.

According to the United States Census Bureau, Royston has a total area of 3.4 square miles (8.8 km^{2}), of which 0.02 square miles (0.05 km^{2}), or 0.51%, is water.

== Demographics ==
Historical population
Census	Pop.	Note	%±
1880	127		—
1890	340		167.7%
1900	579		70.3%
1910	1,422		145.6%
1920	1,681		18.2%
1930	1,447		−13.9%
1940	1,549		7.0%
1950	2,039		31.6%
1960	2,333		14.4%
1970	2,428		4.1%
1980	2,404		−1.0%
1990	2,758		14.7%
2000	2,493		−9.6%
2010	2,582		3.6%
2020	2,649		2.6%
U.S. Decennial Census

=== 2020 census ===
As of the 2020 census, Royston had a population of 2,649. The median age was 40.3 years. 24.5% of residents were under the age of 18 and 20.3% of residents were 65 years of age or older. For every 100 females there were 82.7 males, and for every 100 females age 18 and over there were 77.1 males age 18 and over.

0.0% of residents lived in urban areas, while 100.0% lived in rural areas.

There were 1,118 households in Royston, of which 31.4% had children under the age of 18 living in them. Of all households, 30.1% were married-couple households, 20.3% were households with a male householder and no spouse or partner present, and 42.9% were households with a female householder and no spouse or partner present. About 36.6% of all households were made up of individuals and 18.4% had someone living alone who was 65 years of age or older.

There were 1,277 housing units, of which 12.5% were vacant. The homeowner vacancy rate was 2.9% and the rental vacancy rate was 5.7%.

Racial composition as of the 2020 census
Race	Number	Percent
White	1,803	68.1%
Black or African American	646	24.4%
American Indian and Alaska Native	2	0.1%
Asian	26	1.0%
Native Hawaiian and Other Pacific Islander	1	0.0%
Some other race	51	1.9%
Two or more races	120	4.5%
Hispanic or Latino (of any race)	89	3.4%

=== 2000 census ===
As of the census of 2000, there were 2,493 people, 1,016 households, and 610 families residing in the city. The population density was 728.4 inhabitants per square mile (281.2/km^{2}). There were 1,135 housing units at an average density of 331.6 per square mile (128.0/km^{2}). The racial makeup of the city was 74.25% White, 23.23% African American, 0.08% Native American, 0.68% Asian, 0.36% from other races, and 1.40% from two or more races. Hispanic or Latino of any race were 1.24% of the population.

There were 1,016 households, out of which 27.2% had children under the age of 18 living with them, 37.3% were married couples living together, 19.7% had a female householder with no husband present, and 39.9% were non-families. 35.9% of all households were made up of individuals, and 20.1% had someone living alone who was 65 years of age or older. The average household size was 2.27 and the average family size was 2.97.

In the city, the population was spread out, with 23.4% under the age of 18, 8.5% from 18 to 24, 22.7% from 25 to 44, 20.1% from 45 to 64, and 25.4% who were 65 years of age or older. The median age was 40 years. For every 100 females, there were 78.6 males. For every 100 females age 18 and over, there were 68.6 males.

The median income for a household in the city was $22,024, and the median income for a family was $31,845. Males had a median income of $27,500 versus $21,580 for females. The per capita income for the city was $14,750. About 19.7% of families and 24.7% of the population were below the poverty threshold, including 25.7% of those under age 18 and 23.1% of those age 65 or over.

== Culture ==
- Ty Cobb Museum
- Royston Public Library which is a branch of the Athens Regional Library System

== Notable people ==
- Orville Vernon Burton, scholar
- Spud Chandler, professional baseball pitcher and American League Most Valuable Player in 1943
- Ty Cobb, member of the Baseball Hall of Fame (born in Narrows, GA)
- Dee Dowis, Air Force Academy quarterback
- Clete Donald Johnson, Jr., member of the U.S. House of Representatives and United States Trade Representative
- Tony Jones, professional football player
- Terry Kay, author
- Gary Walker, professional football player
- FPSRussia, YouTuber
- D. W. Brooks, farmer and businessman
- Keyland Rutledge, former offensive lineman for the Georgia Tech Yellow Jackets and current NFL player

== Gallery ==
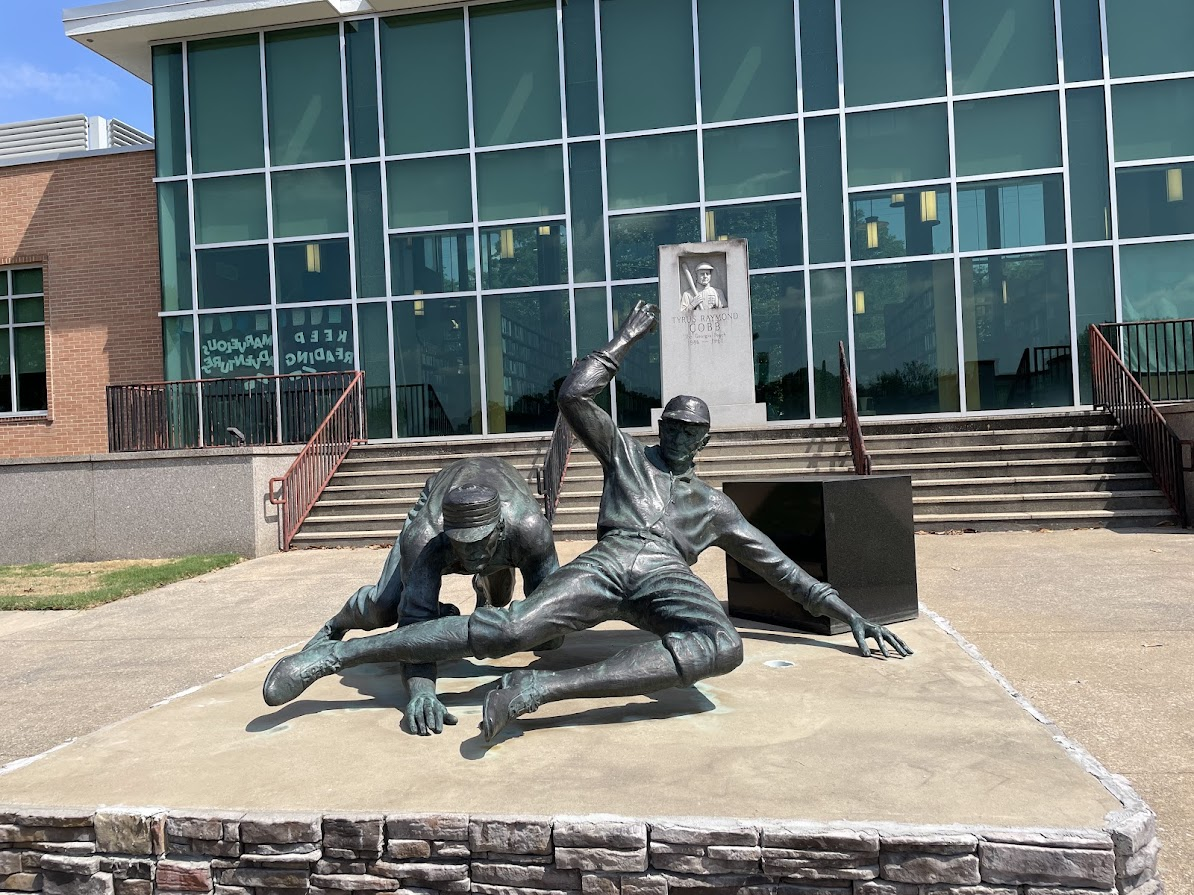
Ty Cobb Statue-Royston Public Library in Royston

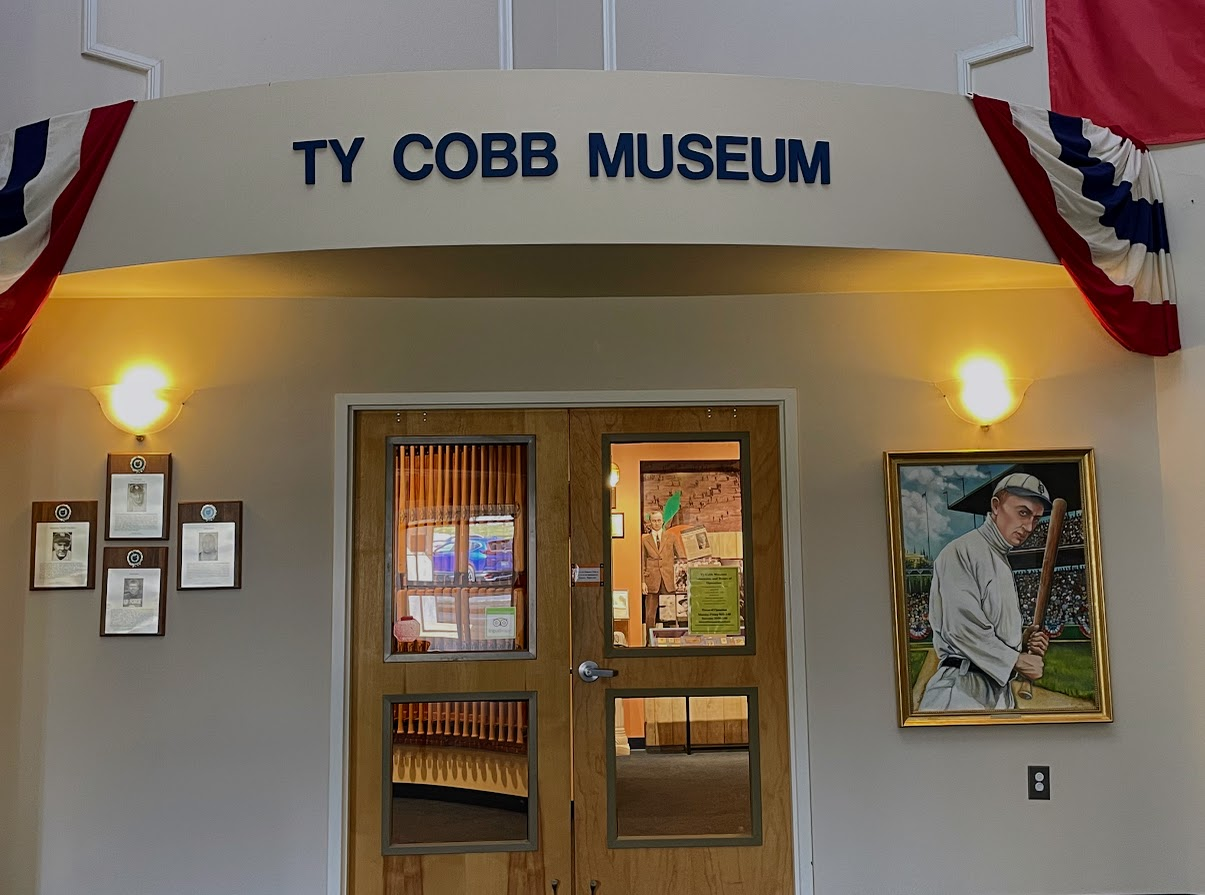
Ty Cobb Museum Entrance in Royston

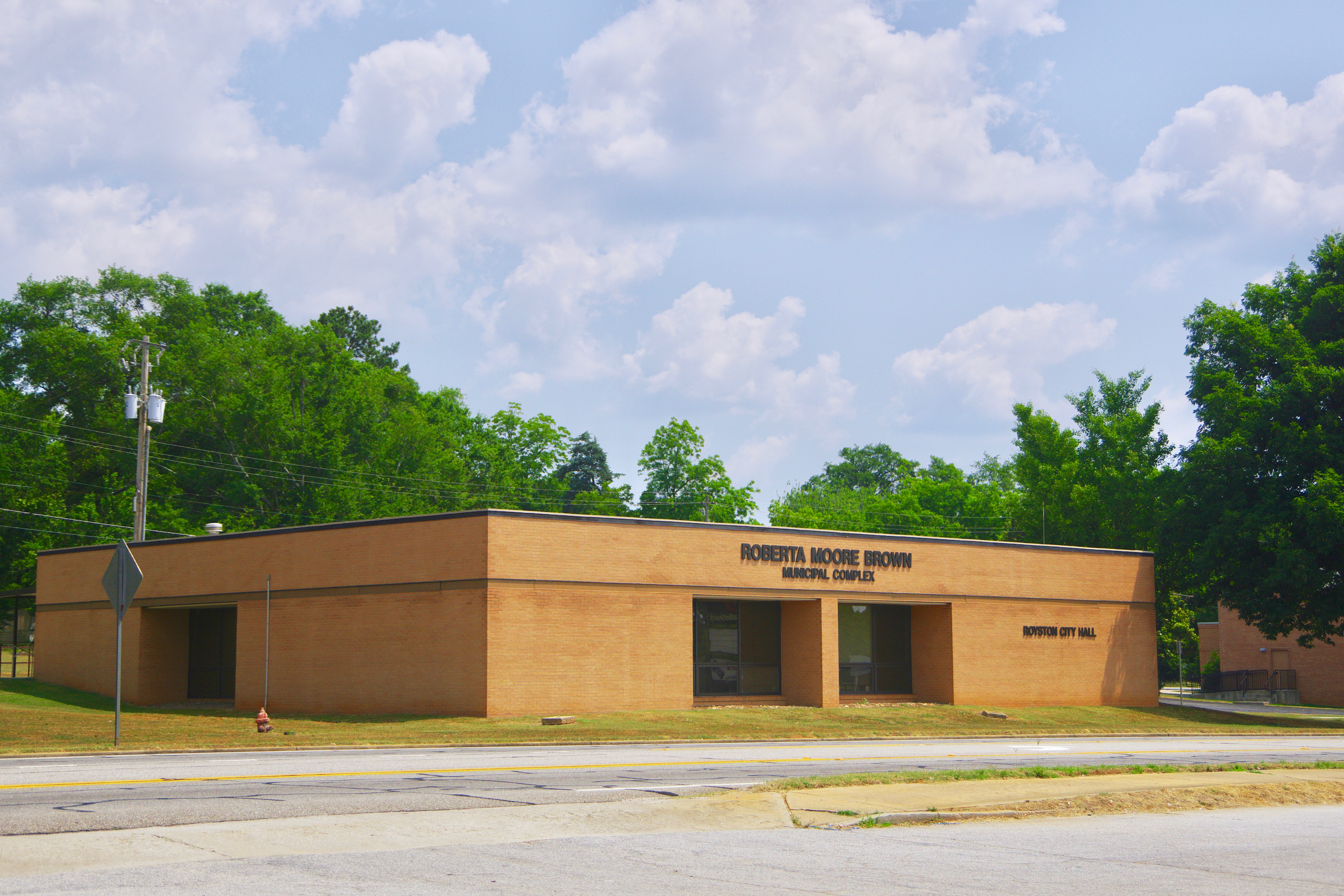
City hall
