= Red Ruffing =

American baseball player and coach (1905–1986)

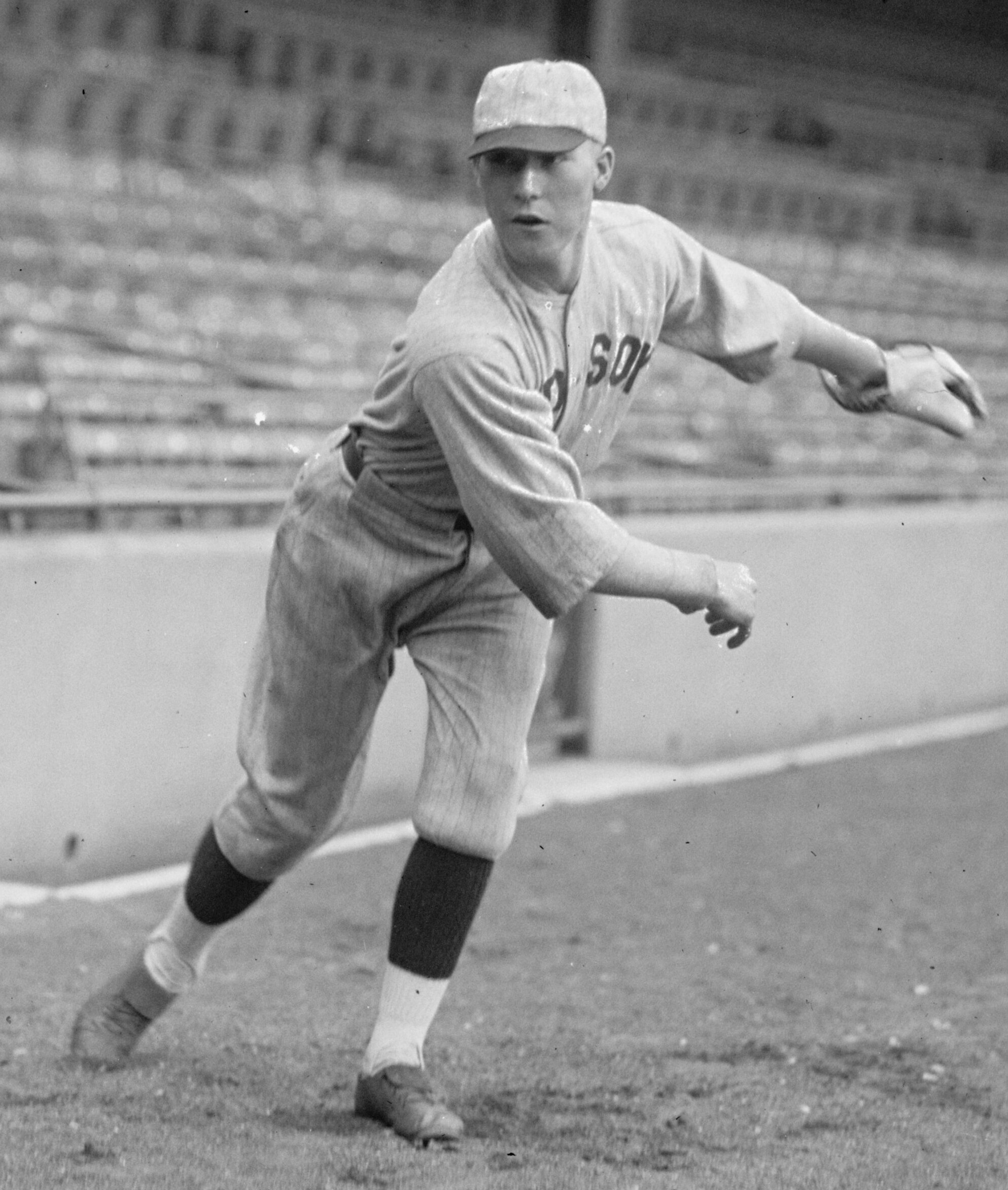
- Ruffing in 1924
- Pitcher
- Born: May 3, 1905; Granville, Illinois, U.S.
- Died: February 17, 1986 (aged 80); Mayfield Heights, Ohio, U.S.
- Batted: Right Threw: Right

MLB debut
- May 31, 1924, for the Boston Red Sox

Last MLB appearance
- September 15, 1947, for the Chicago White Sox

MLB statistics
- Win–loss record: 273–225
- Earned run average: 3.80
- Strikeouts: 1,987
- Stats at Baseball Reference

Teams
- Boston Red Sox (1924–1930); New York Yankees (1930–1942, 1945–1946); Chicago White Sox (1947)

Career highlights and awards
- 6× All-Star (1934, 1938–1942); 6× World Series champion (1932, 1936–1939, 1941); AL wins leader (1938); AL strikeout leader (1932); Boston Red Sox Hall of Fame; Monument Park honoree

Member of the National

Baseball Hall of Fame
- Induction: 1967
- Vote: 86.9% (15th ballot)

Charles Herbert "Red" Ruffing (May 3, 1905 – February 17, 1986) was an American professional baseball player. A pitcher, he played in Major League Baseball (MLB) from 1924 through 1947. He played for the Boston Red Sox, New York Yankees, and Chicago White Sox in a Hall of Fame career. Ruffing is most remembered for his time with the highly successful Yankees teams of the 1930s and 1940s.

Ruffing dropped out of school as a child to work in a coal mine in his native Illinois. He played for the mine's company baseball team as an outfielder and first baseman. After he lost four toes from his left foot in a mining accident, he became unable to run in the field, and switched to pitching. He played in minor league baseball in 1923 and 1924 before making his MLB debut with the Red Sox. After struggling with Boston, pitching to a 39–96 win–loss record, the Red Sox traded Ruffing to the Yankees, where he became successful, pitching as the Yankees' ace through 1946. After one season with the White Sox, Ruffing retired from pitching to work in coaching. He served as a bullpen coach for the White Sox, a pitching coach for the New York Mets.

Ruffing was a member of six World Series championship teams with the Yankees. He also appeared in six MLB All-Star Games. He was inducted into the Baseball Hall of Fame in 1967. The Yankees dedicated a plaque to Ruffing in Monument Park in 2004.

== Early life ==
Charles Herbert Ruffing was born on May 3, 1905, in Granville, Illinois. He was one of five children of John and Frances Ruffing, who emigrated to the United States from Germany. Ruffing was raised in Coalton and Nokomis, Illinois. He went to school in Nokomis. His father was a coal miner, working in a mine in Coalton until he suffered a broken back. John became the superintendent of the mine, and also served as mayor of Coalton.

Red quit school at the age of 13 to work for his father in the mine, earning $3 per day ($64 in current dollar terms), working as a coupler. Conditions in the mine were dangerous. Red's cousin, who also worked in the mine, died in an accident. He also played baseball as an outfielder and first baseman for the mine's company team, and for a semi-professional team in Nokomis.

When Ruffing was 15 years old, he suffered an accident in the mine, where his left foot was crushed between two cars. Though the doctor was able to save his foot, Red lost four toes. He was supposed to begin his professional baseball career in the Kentucky–Illinois–Tennessee League that year, but he found himself unable to run as fast as he previously could. Doc Bennett, the manager of a nearby semi-professional team, suggested that Ruffing should try to continue pursuing a baseball career by becoming a pitcher.

== Professional career ==
=== Minor leagues (1923–24) ===
Bennett helped arrange for Ruffing to sign his first professional contract when he reached the age of 18. Ruffing signed with the Danville Veterans of the Illinois–Indiana–Iowa League, a minor league baseball team in the Class B designation level. With Danville, Ruffing had a 12–16 win–loss record. After pitching for Danville in the 1923 season, the Boston Red Sox purchased Ruffing from Danville for $4,000 ($75,586 in current dollar terms).

The Red Sox assigned Ruffing to the Dover Senators of the Class D Eastern Shore League to pitch at the start of the 1924 season. He had a 4–7 record for Dover.

=== Major leagues ===
==== Boston Red Sox (1924–1930) ====
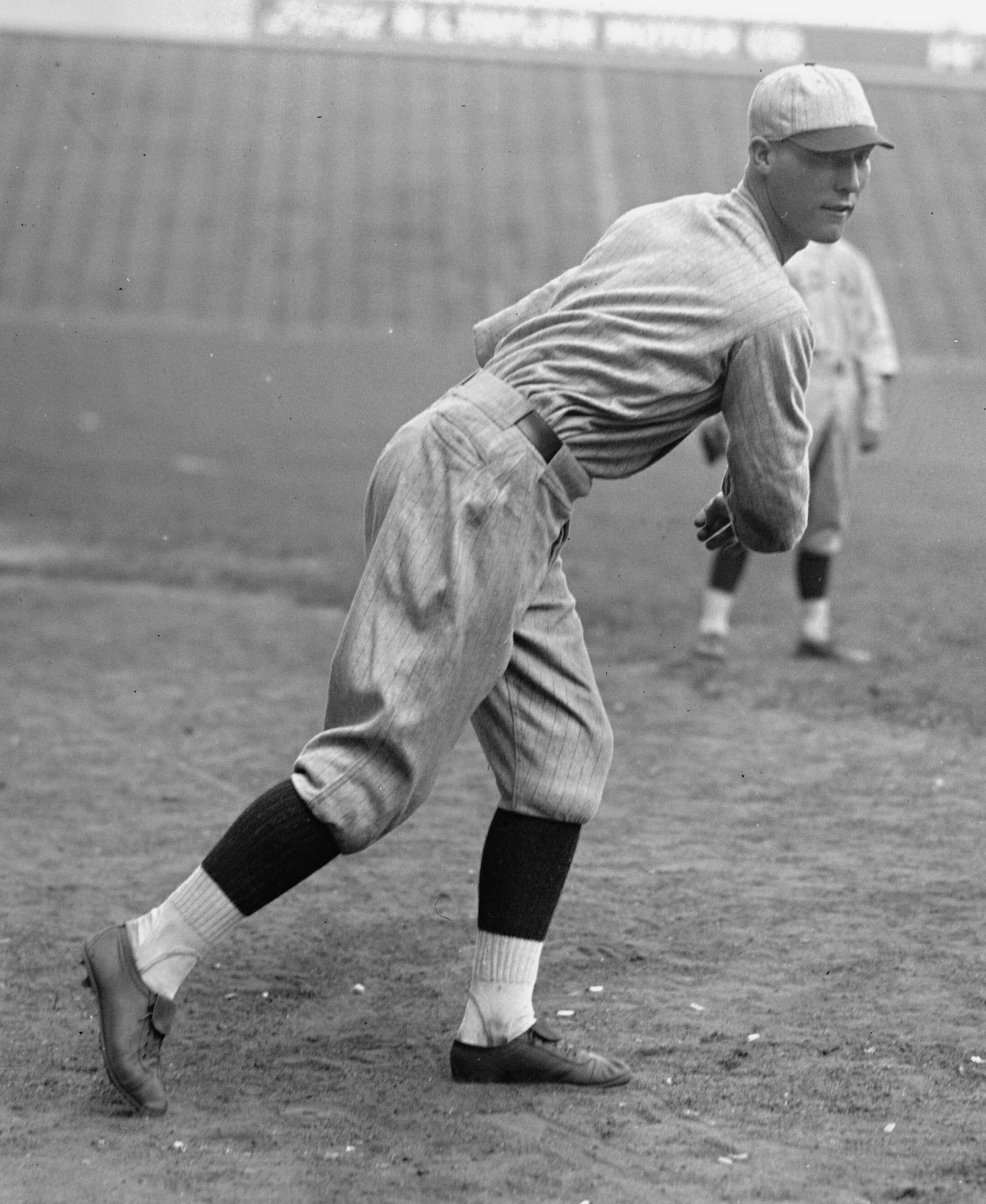
Ruffing warming up before a game in 1924

Ruffing made his major league debut with the Red Sox on May 31, 1924. He pitched without earning a decision in over 23 innings pitched, and had a 6.65 earned run average (ERA). He saw regular playing time with the Red Sox over the next few years but had limited success. He had a 9–18 win–loss record with a 5.01 ERA in the 1925 season, as the Red Sox finished in last place in the eight team American League (AL). Ruffing had a 6–15 win–loss record and a 4.39 ERA in the 1926 season, and a 5–13 win–loss record with a 4.66 ERA in the 1927 season, with the Red Sox finishing in last place both years. His best season to date, in terms of earned run performance, came in 1928, when he posted a 3.89 ERA. However, he led the AL in earned runs allowed, with 125, and had a 10–25 win–loss record, which led the AL in losses. On a positive note, he also led the AL with 25 complete games. As Ruffing had a .314 batting average during the 1928 season, the Red Sox and Ruffing considered having him shift to the outfield. The team decided against a position change due to the limitations of Ruffing's left foot.

The Red Sox chose Ruffing to be their Opening Day starting pitcher for the 1929 season. During the 1929 season, he again led the AL in losses, with 22, and earned runs, with 135. He won only nine games. Ruffing often had difficulty pitching more than five innings in a game. Someone in the Red Sox organization suggested to Ruffing that he should try to gain weight by drinking beer, which saw him grow from 185 pounds (84 kg) to 240 pounds (110 kg).

During the 1930 season, Bob Quinn, the owner of the Red Sox, was in debt and afraid he would lose the team due to foreclosure. To raise capital, he traded Ruffing to the New York Yankees for reserve outfielder Cedric Durst, $50,000 ($963,645 in current dollar terms), and a $50,000 loan from Jacob Ruppert, the Yankees' owner. Ruffing ended his 5 1/2-year tenure with the Red Sox with a 39–96 win–loss record; his winning percentage (.289) was lower than that of the Red Sox during his tenure (.344).

==== New York Yankees ====
===== 1930–1938 =====
Miller Huggins, who served as the Yankees' manager through 1929, had attempted to acquire Ruffing from the Red Sox for the last couple years of his Yankees' tenure. When Ruffing told him that he was considering moving to the outfield, Huggins told him he should continue as a pitcher. Bob Shawkey, a former pitcher who succeeded Huggins as the Yankees new manager in 1930, had convinced Ed Barrow, the Yankees' general manager, to acquire Ruffing. Shawkey believed he could change Ruffing's approach to pitching to obtain better results. Shawkey worked with Ruffing to change his pitching delivery, so that Ruffing used his body more. This helped Ruffing save his arm strength for the later innings of the game. The trade of Ruffing for Durst is now reckoned as one of the most lopsided trades in baseball history; Durst was a reserve outfielder who always batted at the bottom of the lineup when he was used. The 1930 season proved to be Durst's worst year in the majors. Ruffing had a 0–3 record with the Red Sox before the trade. He won 15 games for the Yankees after the trade, losing only five games.

The Yankees chose Ruffing as their starting pitcher for Opening Day in 1931. During the 1931 season, Ruffing had a 16–14 win–loss record with a 4.41 ERA. The Yankees finished the season in second place. On August 13, 1932, Ruffing threw a complete-game shutout and hit a home run in the tenth inning off of Washington Senators' pitcher Tommy Thomas to give the New York Yankees a 1–0 victory. Ruffing became the first pitcher in major league history to win a game 1–0, hit a home run in the game, and strike out ten or more batters. Three other pitchers have since achieved this feat: Early Wynn in 1957, Yovani Gallardo, who did it in 2009, and Noah Syndergaard, who did it on May 2, 2019. Ruffing won 18 games during the 1932 season. He had a 3.09 ERA, second in the AL only to Lefty Grove's 2.84. Ruffing had 190 strikeouts, which led the AL. The Yankees won their first pennant since 1928. Ruffing won his first World Series game during the 1932 World Series against the Chicago Cubs. He started Game One, and the Yankees swept the Cubs four games to zero.

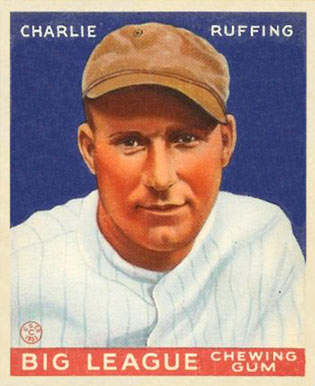
1933 Goudey baseball card of Red Ruffing of the New York Yankees

Ruffing had a 9–14 win–loss record with a 3.91 ERA in the 1933 season, as the Yankees finished in second place in the AL. He threw a one-hitter on June 20, 1934, against the Cleveland Indians. Two weeks later, Joe Cronin selected Ruffing for the 1934 Major League Baseball All-Star Game. At that point, he had a 9–3 win–loss record on the season. He finished the season with a 19–11 win–loss record, as the Yankees finished second in the AL. Ruffing pitched to a 16–11 record in the 1935 season, as the Yankees again finished second in the AL. His 3.12 ERA was third in the league, behind only Grove and Ted Lyons.

Ruffing won 20 games during the 1936 season. In June of that year, Ruffing pitched the longest outing by a New York Yankees pitcher, logging 16 innings in a complete game win against the Cleveland Indians. His 3.85 ERA was the sixth-best in the league, and his 20 wins tied him for third place, with Johnny Allen and Wes Ferrell, behind Tommy Bridges and Vern Kennedy. He started Game One of the 1936 World Series against the New York Giants, but lost. The Yankees defeated the Giants four games to two. In a salary dispute with the Yankees, Ruffing did not report to spring training, and he held out at the start of the 1937 season, missing the first month. He signed in May, receiving a $15,000 salary ($335,937 in current dollar terms). Ruffing had a 20–7 win–loss record for the Yankees in 1937. He finished with the fourth-best ERA in the league, 2.98, trailing Lefty Gomez, Monty Stratton, and Allen, and his 20 wins were second only to Gomez, who had 21. His performance earned him eighth place in AL Most Valuable Player (MVP) Award voting. He started Game Two in the 1937 World Series, earning the victory, as the Yankees defeated the Giants four games to one.

The Yankees started Ruffing on Opening Day for the 1938 season. He was again named an All-Star during the 1938 season. Yankees' manager Joe McCarthy, who managed the AL team in the All-Star Game, chose teammate Lefty Gomez as the starting pitcher. As McCarthy did not believe in pitching two players from the same team in an All-Star Game, Ruffing did not appear in the game. He led the AL with 21 wins in the 1938 season. He also tied for the AL lead in shutouts with three, while his 3.31 ERA was third-best in the league, behind only Grove. Ruffing pitched the opening game of the 1938 World Series against the Cubs. He won two games in the series as the Yankees defeated the Cubs. Ruffing finished fourth in AL MVP voting for the 1938 season.

===== 1939–1946 =====
McCarthy named Ruffing to be the starting pitcher for the Yankees on Opening Day in 1939. McCarthy, managing the AL All-Star team that year, also selected Ruffing as his starter for the 1939 MLB All-Star Game. He missed several weeks late in the 1939 season due to an arm injury, but managed to start Game One of the 1939 World Series. He defeated the Cincinnati Redlegs in that game, and the Yankees won the series in a four-game sweep. Ruffing won 21 games during the 1939 season. His four shutouts in the 1939 season again tied him for the AL lead, while he finished second in wins behind Bob Feller, and fourth in ERA (2.93) behind Grove, Lyons, and Feller. He finished fifth in the balloting for the AL MVP.

Ruffing was the Yankees' Opening Day starting pitcher in 1940. He was named to the 1940 All-Star team, and Cronin, acting as manager, selected Ruffing as his starting pitcher. Ruffing finished the season with a 15–12 win–loss record. Ruffing was a member of the 1941 All-Star team as well, but he did not pitch in the game. He had a 15–6 win–loss record during the 1941 season, and was named the starting pitcher for Game One of the 1941 World Series against the Brooklyn Dodgers. Ruffing defeated the Dodgers, as the Yankees won the series four games to one.

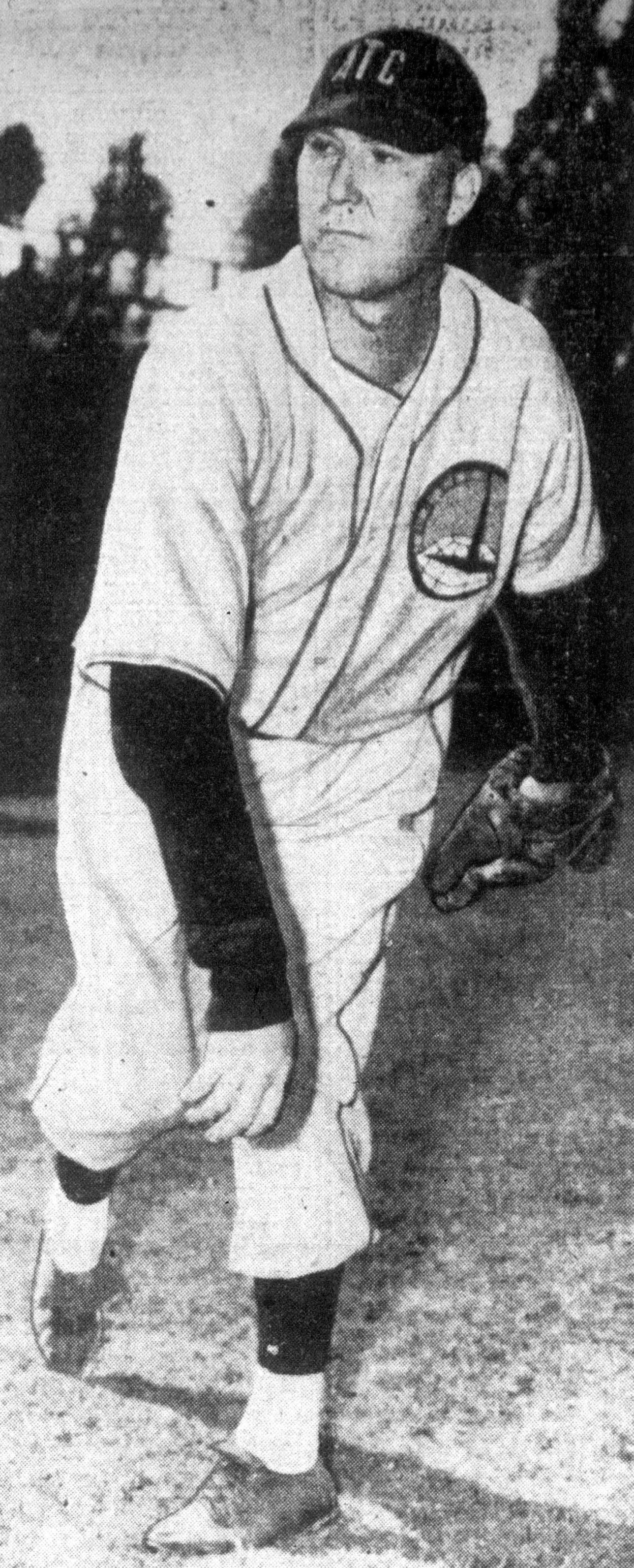
Ruffing wearing an Air Transport Command baseball uniform during World War II.

Ruffing pitched for the Yankees during Opening Day of the 1942 season. That year, he compiled a 14–7 win–loss record. He was again named an All-Star, and again did not pitch in the All-Star Game, which was started by teammate Spud Chandler. Though teammate Tiny Bonham had a better season, pitching to a 21–5 win–loss record, McCarthy again chose Ruffing as his Game One starter for the 1942 World Series, setting a record with six World Series Game One starts that stood until Whitey Ford started his seventh Game One in the 1963 World Series. Ruffing defeated the St. Louis Cardinals in Game One, his seventh World Series victory. This set a record that was surpassed by Ford in 1960. Ruffing pitched again in the Game Five, with the Yankees down three games to one. Ruffing lost the game, as the Cardinals defeated the Yankees to win the series.

After the 1942 season, Ruffing took a job with Vultee Aircraft, a defense contractor. Despite his age (37) and missing toes, a United States Army doctor certified Ruffing as Class 1-B in the Selective Service System, overruled Ruffing's personal physician, who had ruled Ruffing unfit for service. The Army decided that Ruffing could serve in a non-combat role. Ruffing missed the 1943 and 1944 seasons due to his service during World War II. He served in the Sixth Ferrying Group of the Air Transport Command of the United States Army Air Forces at the rank of private. However, he did pitch for the Air Transport Command's baseball team, throwing a perfect game against Joe DiMaggio's team, and leading his team to the championship against Ted Lyons' team. In 1944, he played with an All-Star team for troops stationed in Hawaii.

Ruffing turned 40 years of age during the war, resulting in his discharge in June 1945. He rejoined the Yankees that month, signing for the same $20,000 salary ($357,671 in current dollar terms) he earned in 1942. He made his first appearance with the Yankees since the 1942 season in July 1945. Pitching for the Yankees as a spot starter in 1946, he had a 5–1 win–loss record and a 1.77 ERA when he suffered a broken kneecap from a line drive hit by Hank Majeski, and missed the remainder of the season.

In total, Ruffing won 231 games with the Yankees. This mark was the most in franchise history, until Ford surpassed it in 1965. He remains the winningest right-handed pitcher in Yankees' history.

==== Chicago White Sox (1947) ====
Suffering from recurrent knee injuries, the Yankees released Ruffing after the 1946 season. He signed with the Chicago White Sox for the 1947 season, but continued to be limited by his knee. In May, the White Sox removed Ruffing from their active roster after he was hit in his bad knee with another line drive. He rejoined the White Sox' active roster in July. He pitched to a 3–5 win–loss record and a 6.11 ERA in nine games pitched on the season. Ruffing retired after the 1947 season.

==== Career summary ====
Ruffing threw a fastball, a "sharp" curveball, and a slider. According to AL umpire Bill Summers, "[O]n account of Red Ruffing, the slider got to be the thing." Joe Paparella, also an AL umpire, said "The first game I ever worked behind the plate in the major leagues was against the guy who invented the slider and had the best slider ever seen — Red Ruffing".

Ruffing finished his career with 273 wins, 225 losses, 1,987 strikeouts and a 3.80 ERA. He also had 16 saves. Ruffing compiled 335 complete games in his 536 games started.

A combination of his extensive career workload, the offense-heavy era he pitched in, poor early ERAs prior to a mid-career change in his delivery, and the fact he pitched his entire 22-year career in a single league, Ruffing holds the AL record for most runs and earned runs allowed. This belies the fact that he finished in the Top 10 in the AL in ERA for eight consecutive years after mastering his new delivery, finishing 2nd twice and 3rd and 4th once each between 1932 and 1940. This two second-place finishes were to Hall of Famer Lefty Grove, who dominated the 1930s with seven league leads during the decade en route to his all-time AL record of nine. So high were ERAs during the 1932-1940 span that three times Grove was the only pitcher to better a 3.00 ERA, and once, in 1938, no AL pitcher did, Grove leading the league a 3.08.

Ruffing was an excellent hitter for a pitcher, good enough to frequently be called on to pinch hit and even play the outfield in emergency situations. His 36 home runs rank fourth in MLB history among pitchers behind Ferrell and Bob Lemon. He hit over .300 in eight different seasons, batting .269 overall with 521 hits in 1,937 career at-bats.

== Coaching career ==
After he retired from pitching, Ruffing stayed with the White Sox organization to instruct their players. The White Sox named Ruffing the manager of their Class A minor league affiliate, the Muskegon Clippers of the Central League, for the 1949 season. That season, the Clippers finished in fifth place out of six teams. In 1950, Ruffing managed the Daytona Beach Islanders of the Florida State League, a Cleveland Indians' affiliate.

When Al Simmons retired from his coaching position with the Indians just before the 1951 season due to his failing health, bullpen coach Jake Flowers was moved to the third base coaching position, and Ruffing took over Flowers's duties. From 1952 through 1961, Ruffing was a player personnel executive for the Indians. Ruffing returned to the baseball field serving as pitching coach for the expansion New York Mets in 1962, which were run by George Weiss, the general manager, and Casey Stengel, the manager. Weiss and Stengel had held the same positions with the Yankees during Ruffing's tenure. As a team, the Mets had a 5.04 ERA across the 1962 season, which was the worst in the major leagues. The job also involved scouting duties, which Ruffing did not like, and he retired shortly after the season ended. He returned to baseball again for the 1969 season, at the request of former teammate Don Heffner, who was managing the Denver Bears of the American Association. Ruffing served as Heffner's pitching coach.

== Personal life ==
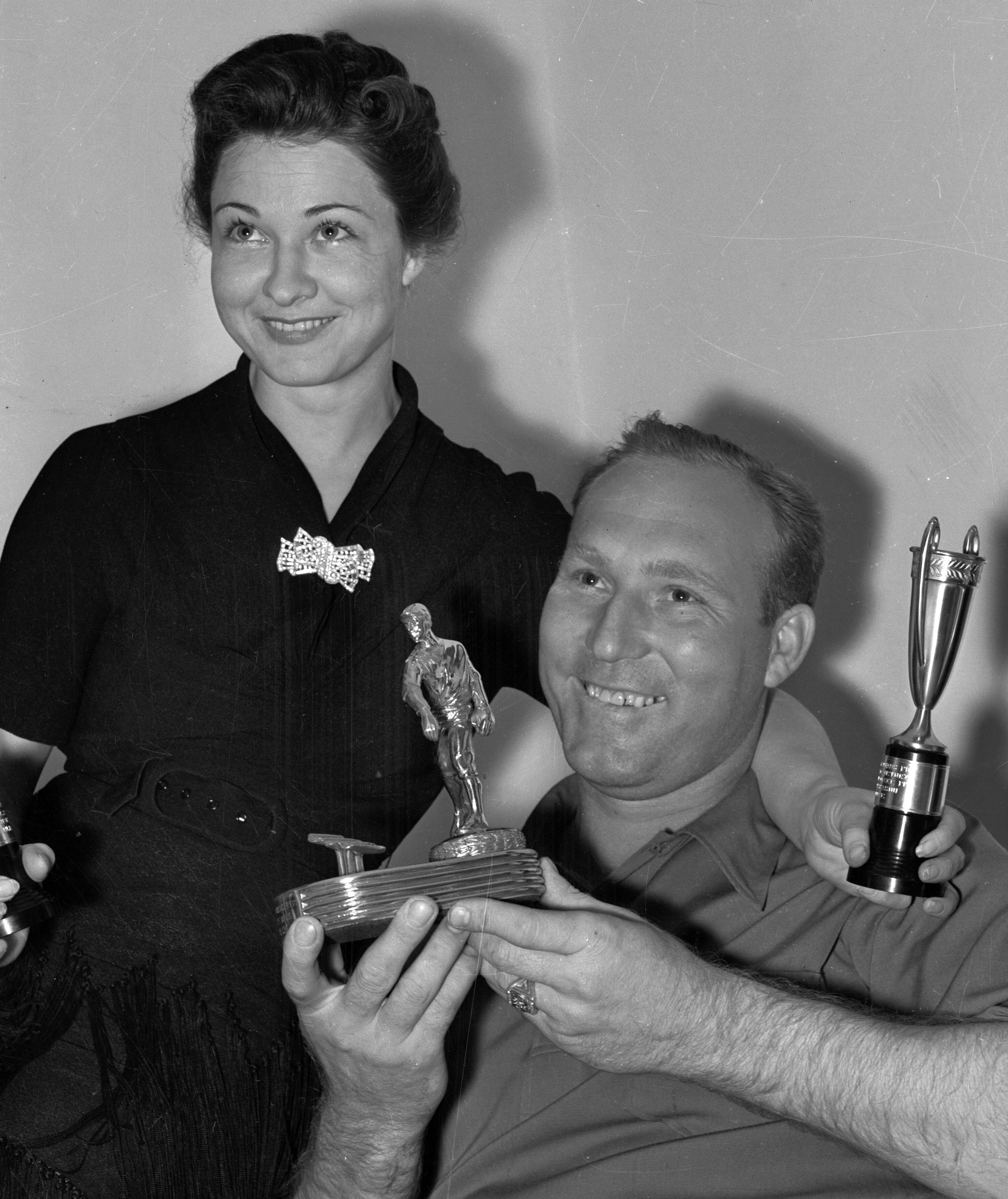
Ruffing, with his wife Pauline Mulholland, holding trophies in their house in Long Beach, California in 1939.

Ruffing married Pauline Mulholland, a native of Chicago, at the end of the 1934 season. The couple settled in Long Beach, California. When he worked for the Indians in the 1950s, the Ruffing family relocated to Cleveland. The couple had a son, named Charles Jr.

Ruffing suffered a stroke in 1974, at the age of 68, which left him paralyzed on his left side. As a result, he used a wheelchair for the remainder of his life. This was Ruffing's second stroke, and he also suffered from kidney and heart problems. He contracted skin cancer, necessitating the partial amputation of one of his ears. He died on February 17, 1986, at Hillcrest Hospital in Mayfield Heights, Ohio, of heart failure.

== Honors ==
In balloting for the National Baseball Hall of Fame following his retirement, Ruffing often received votes from approximately 50% of the voters in the Baseball Writers' Association of America, short of the 75% required for induction. Bob Feller wrote an article in The Saturday Evening Post in 1962, calling Ruffing, Satchel Paige, and Luke Appling the three most deserving players who had yet to be elected. The 1967 balloting was Ruffing's final year of eligibility, as he had retired 20 years prior. Ruffing finished with 212 votes, tied with Joe Medwick for the highest vote count, but was still seven votes short of the 219 required for induction. However, a runoff election held the next month saw Ruffing elected to the Hall of Fame.

During an Old-Timers' Day ceremony held on July 10, 2004, at Yankee Stadium, the Yankees dedicated a plaque in Ruffing's memory. The plaque is displayed in Monument Park. ESPN.com ranked Ruffing as the ninth greatest Yankee of all time.

A museum in Nokomis, Illinois, the Bottomley-Ruffing-Schalk Museum, is dedicated to Ruffing and fellow Hall of Famers Ray Schalk and Jim Bottomley.

In 2013, the Bob Feller Act of Valor Award honored Ruffing as one of 37 Baseball Hall of Fame members for his service in the United States Army Air Force during World War II.

== See also ==
- List of Major League Baseball career wins leaders
- List of Major League Baseball career wins leaders
- List of Major League Baseball annual strikeout leaders
- List of Major League Baseball annual wins leaders
- List of Major League Baseball career strikeout leaders
- List of Major League Baseball all-time leaders in home runs by pitchers
