= Ivan Allen Jr. Braves Museum and Hall of Fame =

Former museum in Atlanta, Georgia, USA

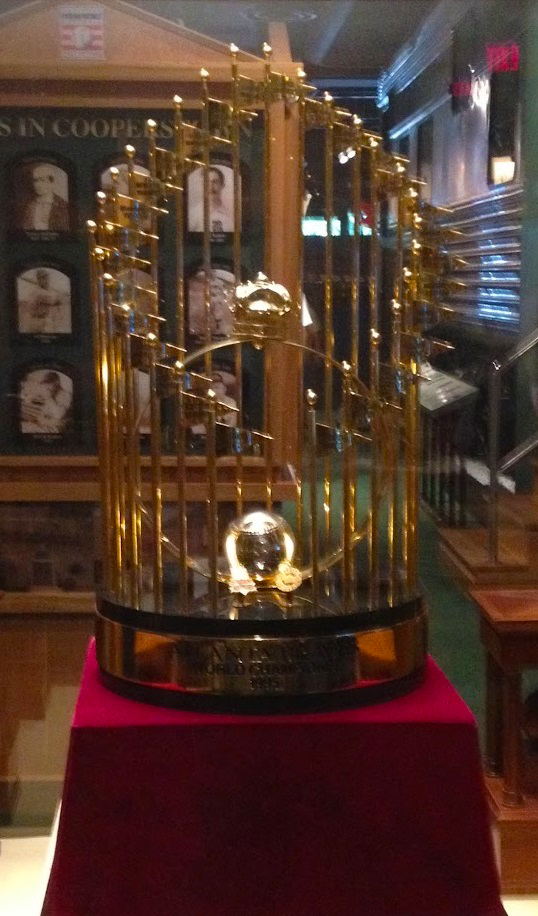
The 1995 World Series Commissioner's Trophy on display in the museum

The Ivan Allen Jr. Braves Museum and Hall of Fame (BMHF) was founded in 1999, to honor various players, managers, coaches, executives, and others who had been a part of the Atlanta Braves professional-baseball franchise during its years in Boston (1871–1952), Milwaukee (1953–1965), and/or Atlanta (1966–2016). The museum and hall of fame was named after former Atlanta mayor Ivan Allen Jr. and was located in Turner Field (on the northwest side at Aisle 134.), which closed on October 2, 2016.

== Exhibits ==
=== Braves Hall of Fame ===
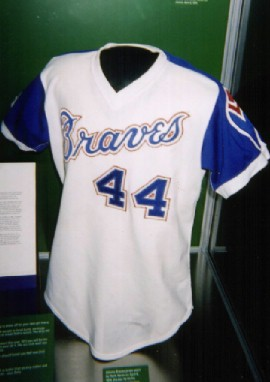
The jersey Hank Aaron wore when he broke Babe Ruth's home run record on display in the museum's "Atlanta" exhibit

The Braves Hall of Fame consists of 35 members who contributed to the franchise during its 152 seasons, whether they were players, managers, broadcasters, or owners.

==== Members ====
Key
Year	Year inducted
**Bold**	Member of the Baseball Hall of Fame
†	Member of the Baseball Hall of Fame as a Brave
**Bold**	Recipient of the Hall of Fame's Ford C. Frick Award

**Braves Hall of Fame**
Year	No.	Name	Position(s)	Tenure
1999	21	**Warren Spahn**^{†}	P	1942, 1946–1964
1999	35	**Phil Niekro**^{†}	P	1964–1983, 1987
1999	41	**Eddie Mathews**^{†}	3B; Manager	1952–1966; 1972–1974
1999	44	**Hank Aaron**^{†}	RF	1954–1974
2000	—	Ted Turner	Owner/President	1976–1996
2000	3	Dale Murphy	OF	1976–1990
2001	32	Ernie Johnson Sr.	P Broadcaster	1950, 1952–1958; 1962–1999
2002	28, 33	Johnny Sain	P Coach	1942, 1946–1951; 1977, 1985–1986
2002	—	Bill Bartholomay	Owner/President	1962–1976
2003	1, 23	Del Crandall	C	1949–1963
2004	—	Pete Van Wieren	Broadcaster	1976–2008
2004	—	**Kid Nichols**^{†}	P	1890–1901
2004	1	Tommy Holmes	OF; Manager	1942–1951; 1951–1952
2004	—	Skip Caray	Broadcaster	1976–2008
2005	—	Paul Snyder	Executive	1973–2007
2005	—	Herman Long	SS	1890–1902
2006	—	Bill Lucas	GM	1976–1979
2006	11, 48	Ralph Garr	OF	1968–1975
2007	23	David Justice	OF	1989–1996
2009	31	**Greg Maddux**	P	1993–2003
2010	47	**Tom Glavine**^{†}	P	1987–2002, 2008
2011	6	**Bobby Cox**^{†}	Manager	1978–1981, 1990–2010
2012	29	**John Smoltz**^{†}	P	1988–1999, 2001–2008
2013	10	**Chipper Jones**^{†}	3B/LF	1993–2012
2014	8	Javy López	C	1992–2003
2014	1	**Rabbit Maranville**^{†}	SS/2B	1912–1920; 1929–1933, 1935
2014	—	Dave Pursley	Trainer	1961–2002
2015	—	Don Sutton	Broadcaster	1989–2006, 2009–2020
2016	25	**Andruw Jones**^{†}	CF	1996–2007
2016	—	**John Schuerholz**	Executive	1990–2016
2018	15	Tim Hudson	P	2005–2013
2018	—	Joe Simpson	Broadcaster	1992–present
2019	—	**Hugh Duffy**	OF	1892–1900
2019	5, 9	Terry Pendleton	3B; Coach	1991–1994, 1996; 2002–2017
2022	9	Joe Adcock	1B/OF	1953–1962
2022	54	Leo Mazzone	Coach	1990–2005
2022	9, 15	**Joe Torre**	C/1B/3B; Manager	1960–1968; 1982–1984
2023	25, 43, 77	Rico Carty	LF	1963–1972
2023	—	Fred Tenney	1B	1894–1907, 1911
2025		Wally Berger	OF	1930-1937
2026	43	Brian Snitker	Manager	2016-2025

=== "City" Exhibits ===
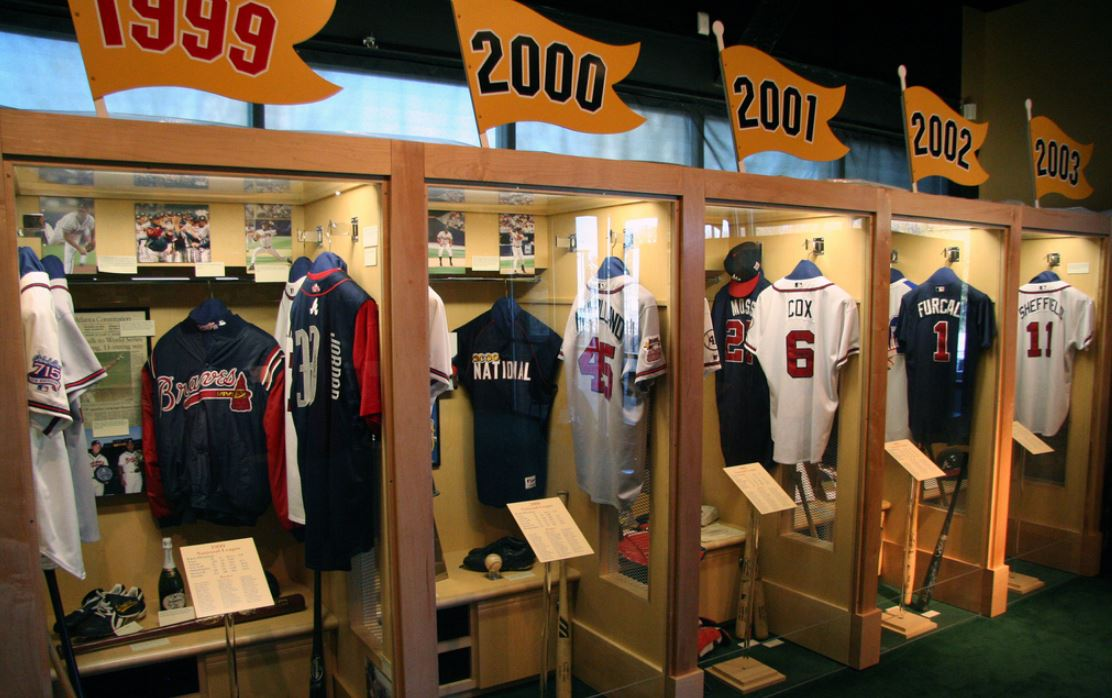
Individual exhibits for the Braves' NL championship seasons as seen in the "Atlanta" exhibit

The museum featured three "city" exhibits (for Boston, Milwaukee, and Atlanta) that each featured items and information for the Braves from their times in that respective city. Included in these exhibits were "Babe Ruth as a Brave" and the 1914 World Series exhibit from Boston, a section of an original Baltimore and Ohio Railroad Car and the 1957 World Series exhibit from Milwaukee, and Hank Aaron's 715th home run exhibit and the 1995 World Series exhibit with replica rings and the Commissioner's Trophy from Atlanta.

=== "Braves in Cooperstown" ===
This exhibit featured photos of all who played for the Braves franchise who are members of the National Baseball Hall of Fame.

==== Braves in National Baseball Hall of Fame ====
Atlanta Braves Hall of Famers
Affiliation according to the National Baseball Hall of Fame and Museum
Boston Braves

Earl Averill
Dave Bancroft
Dan Brouthers
**John Clarkson***
Jimmy Collins
**Hugh Duffy***
Johnny Evers

Burleigh Grimes
Billy Hamilton
Billy Herman
Rogers Hornsby
Joe Kelley
King Kelly
Ernie Lombardi

**Rabbit Maranville**
Rube Marquard
**Tommy McCarthy**
Bill McKechnie
Joe Medwick
**Kid Nichols***
Jim O'Rourke

Charley Radbourn
Babe Ruth
Frank Selee**
Al Simmons
George Sisler
Casey Stengel
Ed Walsh

Lloyd Waner
Paul Waner
Deacon White
Vic Willis**
George Wright
Harry Wright
Cy Young

Milwaukee Braves

**Eddie Mathews**

Red Schoendienst
Enos Slaughter

**Warren Spahn**

Atlanta Braves

**Hank Aaron**
Orlando Cepeda

**Bobby Cox**
**Tom Glavine**
**Andruw Jones**

**Chipper Jones**
Greg Maddux***
**Phil Niekro**

Gaylord Perry
John Schuerholz***
**John Smoltz**

Bruce Sutter
Joe Torre
Hoyt Wilhelm

- Players and managers listed in **bold** are depicted on their Hall of Fame plaques wearing a Braves cap insignia.
- * Has no insignia on his cap due to playing at a time when caps bore no insignia.
- ** Hall of Fame plaque depiction is without a cap.
- *** No cap insignia on Hall of Fame plaque. Schuerholz' plaque did not bear a cap because he was elected as an executive.

=== "The Transformation of Turner Field" ===
This exhibit showed how Centennial Olympic Stadium was transformed into Turner Field following the 1996 Summer Olympics.

=== "Braves Leaderboard" ===
This exhibit featured a large scoreboard that tracked current players' progress into breaking Braves franchise pitching and hitting records.

== Move to Truist Park ==
The Braves decided against building a museum into Truist Park, instead preferring to have the memorabilia throughout the new park.

== See also ==
- Atlanta Braves award winners and league leaders § Braves Hall of Fame
- Ty Cobb Museum
- Georgia Sports Hall of Fame
- List of museums in Georgia (U.S. state)
- Milwaukee Braves Wall of Honor
