= Mickey Owen =

American baseball player (1916–2005)

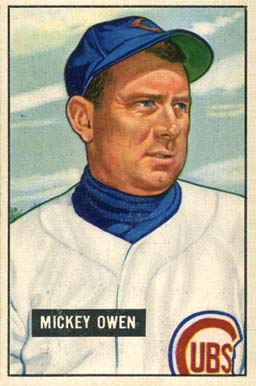
- Catcher
- Born: April 4, 1916; Nixa, Missouri, U.S.
- Died: July 13, 2005 (aged 89); Mount Vernon, Missouri, U.S.
- Batted: Right Threw: Right

MLB debut
- May 2, 1937, for the St. Louis Cardinals

Last MLB appearance
- September 11, 1954, for the Boston Red Sox

MLB statistics
- Batting average: .255
- Home runs: 14
- Runs batted in: 378
- Stats at Baseball Reference

Teams
- St. Louis Cardinals (1937–1940); Brooklyn Dodgers (1941–1945); Chicago Cubs (1949–1951); Boston Red Sox (1954)

Career highlights and awards
- 4× All-Star (1941–1944)

Arnold Malcolm "Mickey" Owen (April 4, 1916 – July 13, 2005) was an American professional baseball player, coach and scout. He played as a catcher for 13 seasons in Major League Baseball between 1937 and 1954 for the St. Louis Cardinals, Brooklyn Dodgers, Chicago Cubs and Boston Red Sox. Considered an outstanding defensive catcher, his career was nonetheless marred by a crucial error (Note: This in accord with the scoring rules in effect in 1941. The play would be scored a passed ball today.) that he committed during the 1941 World Series.

Owen also was one of the better-known major league players who defected to the insurgent Mexican League in 1946, which resulted in a suspension that cost him over three prime seasons of his big-league career.

== Career ==
As a major leaguer, Owen posted a .255 batting average with 14 home runs and 378 runs batted in during 1,209 games. His 929 hits also included 163 doubles and 21 triples. He threw and batted right-handed, stood 5 feet 10 inches (1.78 m) tall and weighed 190 pounds (86 kg).

Born in Nixa, in Southwestern Missouri, Owen was signed by the Cardinals in 1935 and made his major league debut in 1937, appearing in 80 games, spending the next three full seasons in St. Louis before being traded to the Brooklyn Dodgers for catcher Gus Mancuso, a minor league player and $60,000.

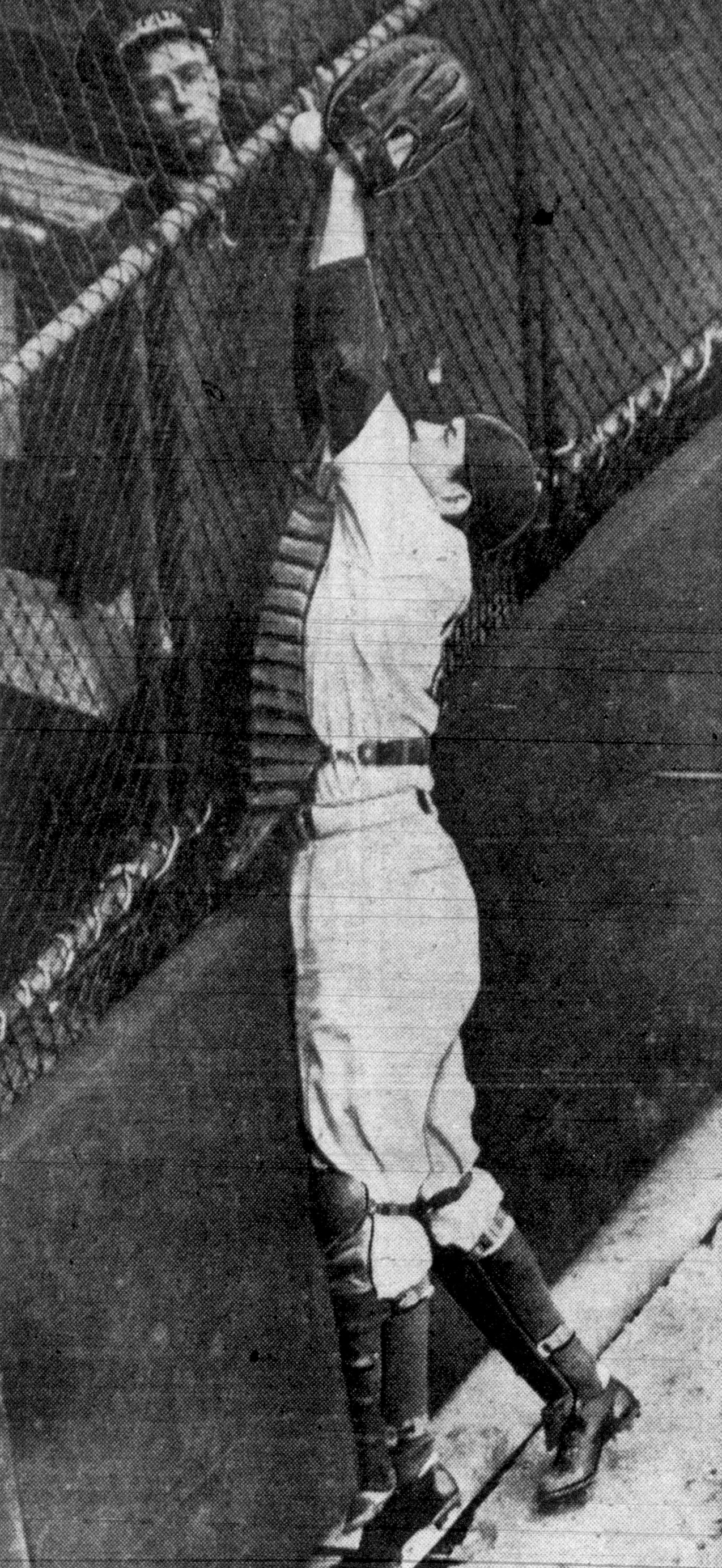
Owen during the 1942 season

=== 1941 World Series ===
From 1941 to 1944, Owen averaged 46 runs batted in per season for the Dodgers and played for the Brooklyn team which faced the New York Yankees in the 1941 World Series. During 1941 National League season, he set a then-record for most consecutive errorless fielding chances by a catcher (508) and finished with a .995 fielding average. Yet, ironically, Owen is most remembered in baseball lore today for a costly mistake that he committed during that year's World Series. The Yankees held a 2-games-to-1 lead entering Game 4 on October 5 at the Dodgers' home field, Ebbets Field. With the Dodgers leading 4–3 and 2 outs for the Yankees in the top of the ninth inning and the count 3–2 on Tommy Henrich, Henrich swung and missed at strike 3, which would have been the final out of the game, but the ball eluded Owen and went to the backstop, allowing Henrich to make it safely to first base. The Yankees then rallied and scored four runs in the remainder of the inning and won the game 7–4. Instead of the series being tied, the victory gave the Yankees a 3–1 lead. The next day, they beat the Dodgers 3–1 in Game 5 and won the World Championship. The Dodgers did not return to the World Series until 1947 and didn't win the series until 1955.

A member of the National League's All-Star team for four consecutive seasons, from 1941 to 1944, in 1942 Owen became the first player to pinch-hit a home run in an All-Star game, and during the 1944 regular season, he became the third National League catcher to ever record an unassisted double play. Owen played for Brooklyn until the end of the 1945 season. He then served in the Navy at the end of World War II.

=== Mexican League ===
After his discharge from the military in 1946, Owen expected to return to Brooklyn, but he failed to reach an agreement with the Dodgers and signed a contract to be a player-manager with Unión Laguna de Torreón in the Mexican League, which was then outside of organized baseball and offering major league players constrained by the reserve clause higher pay to "jump" their contracts. Other big leaguers who fled to Mexico included Alex Carrasquel, Danny Gardella, Max Lanier, Sal Maglie, Luis Olmo, Fred Martin, and (briefly) Vern Stephens, attracted by very good salaries. In retaliation for the defections, Commissioner Happy Chandler suspended the "jumpers" from playing in MLB.

Owen quickly soured on the idea of managing, and tried to return to the Dodgers just a week after signing a contract. However, his appeals to general manager Branch Rickey fell on deaf ears, and Owen returned to Mexico, this time with the Azules de Veracruz, owned by league president Jorge Pasquel. Under the new contract, Owen would play in the 1946 season, and assume managerial duties in 1947. In 51 games with Veracruz in 1946, Owen batted .256 with 25 runs batted in.

Owen's time in the Mexican League was marked by several racially-charged altercations. He disliked the league's racially integrated nature, and reportedly told owner Pasquel that he would not catch non-white pitchers; accordingly, Pasquel traded away Azules pitchers Schoolboy Johnny Taylor, a reliever from the Negro leagues, and Alex Carrasquel, a Venezuelan who had played in the majors. (Note: McKelvey writes that "Carrasquel, a Venezuelan, was not black but he was close enough for Owen.") Owen played in the 1946 All-Star Game for the Southern team, but only after an altercation where he refused to catch from the black All-Star starting pitcher Booker McDaniel. Later in the season, he was suspended for a fistfight with black player Claro Duany after a collision at home plate.

Owen left Mexico on August 5 and applied for reinstatement in MLB, alleging that Pasquel had voided his original contract with Torreón. However, Chandler denied the appeal. Pasquel filed a suit against Owen for breach of contract, where he also claimed that Owen had difficulties with blacks and Cubans; the suit continued until 1952, when a federal court in Springfield, Missouri ruled against Owen and ordered him to pay $35,000 for breach of contract.

=== Later career ===
Owen's suspension was lifted in June 1949. By then, Roy Campanella and Bruce Edwards were entrenched as Brooklyn's catchers. Owen was claimed off waivers on July 2 by the Chicago Cubs and he returned to the majors on July 4 against the Cardinals at Wrigley Field. Starting at catcher, he went hitless in three at bats — ironically, against Lanier and Martin, whose suspensions had also been lifted the month before, and who pitched for St. Louis that day. Owen played for the Cubs through the 1951 season, became a player-manager with the Norfolk Tars in the Yankees' farm system, then finished his major league playing career with the Boston Red Sox in 1954.

Following his retirement as a player, Owen spent two seasons (1955–56) as a Red Sox coach, managed the Jacksonville Braves of the Sally League for part of the 1957 campaign, then worked for the Cubs as a scout.

He returned to the Ozarks and founded the Mickey Owen Baseball School on Route 66 near Miller, Missouri, in 1959. Owen sold the school in 1963, but remained an instructor until the 1980s. Notable alumni include Michael Jordan, Joe Girardi, Scott Siman, Charlie Sheen and Charlie Carroll.

== Personal life ==
In 1964, Owen ran for Greene County sheriff and won. He also won three more elections, serving in office until 1981. Owen ran for Lt. Governor of Missouri in 1980 and finished third with 13% and 79,038 votes. Owen was still playing in old timers' games in the 1980s.

Owen lived the last years of his life in the Missouri Veterans Home in Mount Vernon. He died in Springfield, Missouri, at age 89.

== In popular culture ==
In his 1942 book Many Happy Returns: An Unofficial Guide to Your Income Tax Problems, Groucho Marx — a lifelong Dodgers fan — referenced Owen's infamous World Series error:

I wrote this book because I had to. It was a creative urge—the same thing that prompted Beethoven to compose the Eighth Symphony. This was actually a patchwork job, adding together snatches of the Third and Fifth, thus making the Eighth. The Ninth was when Catcher Owen dropped the ball and the World Series, but I'd rather not discuss it, because it cost me $14, not deductible.

== Notes ==
Preceded by George Susce	Boston Red Sox bullpen coach 1955–1956	Succeeded by Len Okrie (1961)
