= 1967 Baseball Hall of Fame balloting =

Elections to the Baseball Hall of Fame

National Baseball

Hall of Fame and Museum
- New inductees: 3
- via BBWAA: 1
- via Veterans Committee: 2
- Total inductees: 107
- Induction date: July 24, 1967

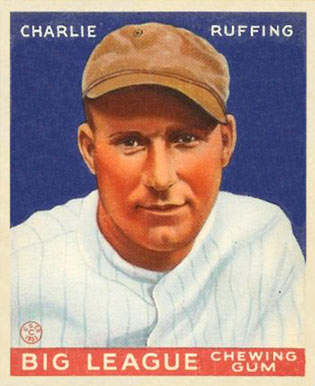
1967 BBWAA inductee Red Ruffing

Elections to the Baseball Hall of Fame for 1967 included a special election, as the Baseball Writers' Association of America (BBWAA) held its first balloting in an odd-number year since 1955. The special election was held due to some ineligible players having received votes in the prior year's balloting, (Note: Contemporary news reports do not indicate who any of the "ineligible players" were.) and the BBWAA wanting "to give those eligible every opportunity" to be selected.

In this year's voting, the BBWAA did not elect anyone on the first ballot. In a second (runoff) election, Red Ruffing received the most votes, resulting in his election to the Hall of Fame. Had this year's special election not been held, Ruffing would have been ineligible for selection by the writers in 1968, as he last played in 1947 and would have exceeded the 20-year eligibility limit. BBWAA rules were subsequently updated to return to annual voting, while eliminating runoff ballots.

The Veterans Committee met in closed sessions to consider executives, managers, umpires, and earlier major league players. It selected two people, Branch Rickey and Lloyd Waner. A formal induction ceremony was held in Cooperstown, New York, on July 24, 1967, with Commissioner of Baseball William Eckert presiding.

== BBWAA election ==
The BBWAA was authorized to elect players active in 1947 or later, but not after 1961; the ballot included selected players, chosen by a screening committee, whose last appearance was in 1961. All 10-year members of the BBWAA were eligible to vote.

Voters were instructed to cast votes for up to 10 candidates; any candidate receiving votes on at least 75% of the ballots would be honored with induction to the Hall. The ballot consisted of 47 players; a total of 292 ballots were cast, with 219 votes required for election. A total of 2,321 individual votes were cast, an average of 7.95 per ballot.

No one reached the threshold, so there was a runoff election featuring the 31 leading candidates (30, including a tie). There would be one winner regardless of numerical support on the second ballot; in fact, winner Red Ruffing tallied 266 of 306 votes or 87%. A total of 1,198 individual votes were cast in the run-off, an average of 4.10 per ballot, as voters concentrated their support on the leading candidates.

Candidates who were eligible for the first time are indicated here with a dagger (†). Candidates who have since been elected in subsequent elections are indicated in italics. Al López was later elected as a manager.

Red Ruffing, Al López, Billy Herman, Mel Harder and Ernie Lombardi were on the ballot for the final time because they last played in 1947.

Player	Vote	Percent	Change	Runoff
**Red Ruffing**	212	72.6	▲3.7%	266
Joe Medwick	212	72.6	▲10.7%	248
Roy Campanella	204	69.9	▲4.7%	170
Lou Boudreau	143	49.0	▲10.9%	68
Ralph Kiner	124	42.5	▲18.0%	41
Enos Slaughter	123	42.1	▲9.0%	48
Al López	114	39.0	▲2.9%	50
Marty Marion	90	30.8	▲2.3%	22
Johnny Mize	89	30.5	▲3.7%	14
Pee Wee Reese	89	30.5	▼1.0%	16
Johnny Vander Meer	87	29.8	▲6.0%	35
Allie Reynolds	77	26.4	▲6.5%	19
Phil Rizzuto	71	24.3	▲6.4%	14
Joe Gordon	66	22.6	▲12.3%	13
Bucky Walters	65	22.3	▲3.8%	24
Hal Newhouser	62	21.2	▲10.6%	13
Billy Herman	59	20.2	▲10.9%	14
Mel Harder	52	17.8	▲6.5%	14
Arky Vaughan	46	15.8	▲3.9%	19
Ernie Lombardi	43	14.7	▲3.4%	25
George Kell	40	13.7	▲4.1%	11
Alvin Dark	38	13.0	▲7.4%	7
Bobby Doerr	35	12.0	▲2.1%	15
Bob Lemon	35	12.0	▲5.0%	7
Hank Bauer†	23	7.9	-	9
Bobo Newsom	19	6.5	▼1.8%	6
Don Newcombe	18	6.2	▲3.9%	2
Phil Cavarretta	15	5.1	▲2.1%	4
Mickey Vernon	14	4.8	▼1.8%	2
Larry Doby	10	3.4	▲1.1%	1
Bobby Thomson	10	3.4	▼0.6%	1
Ted Kluszewski†	9	3.1	-	
Gil McDougald	4	1.4	▼0.3%	
Jackie Jensen†	3	1.0	-	
Terry Moore	3	1.0	-	
Del Ennis	2	0.7	▼0.3%	
Carl Furillo	2	0.7	Steady	
Jim Hegan	2	0.7	▼1.0%	
Earl Torgeson†	2	0.7	-	
Elmer Valo†	2	0.7	-	
Clint Courtney†	1	0.3	-	
Walt Dropo†	1	0.3	-	
Ned Garver†	1	0.3	-	
Grady Hatton	1	0.3	▼1.0%	
Jim Hearn	1	0.3	Steady	
Billy Martin†	1	0.3	-	
Andy Pafko	1	0.3	▼0.4%	

Key to colors
Elected to the Hall. These individuals are also indicated in **bold italics**.
Players who were elected in future elections. These individuals are also indicated in plain italics.
Players not yet elected who returned on the 1968 ballot.
Eliminated from future BBWAA voting. These individuals remained eligible for future Veterans Committee consideration.

== J. G. Taylor Spink Award ==
Grantland Rice (1880–1954) received the J. G. Taylor Spink Award honoring a baseball writer. The award was voted at the December 1966 meeting of the BBWAA, and included in the summer 1967 ceremonies.
