= Tony Jones (offensive tackle) =

American football player (1966–2021)

No. 66, 77
- Position: Offensive tackle

Personal information
- Born: May 24, 1966; Royston, Georgia, U.S.
- Died: January 22, 2021 (aged 54); Suwanee, Georgia, U.S.
- Listed height: 6 ft 5 in (1.96 m)
- Listed weight: 291 lb (132 kg)

Career information
- High school: Carnesville (GA) Franklin Co.
- College: Western Carolina
- NFL draft: 1988: undrafted

Career history
- Cleveland Browns (1988–1995); Baltimore Ravens (1996); Denver Broncos (1997–2000)

Awards and highlights
- 2× Super Bowl champion (XXXII, XXXIII); Second-team All-Pro (1994); Pro Bowl (1998)

Career NFL statistics
- Games played: 184
- Games Started: 174
- Fumble recoveries: 4
- Stats at Pro Football Reference

Tony Edward Jones Sr. (May 24, 1966 – January 22, 2021) was an American professional football player who was an offensive tackle in the National Football League (NFL) from 1988 to 2000. He started Super Bowl XXXII and Super Bowl XXXIII with the Denver Broncos. He was inducted into the Franklin County Sports Hall of Fame as a charter member on July 17, 1998.

Pre-draft measurables
Height	Weight	Hand span	40-yard dash	10-yard split	20-yard split	Bench press
6 ft 5 in (1.96 m)	270 lb (122 kg)	10 in (0.25 m)	5.28 s	1.84 s	3.07 s	19 reps

His cousin DeMario Mayfield is a professional basketball player.

Jones died on January 22, 2021, at the age of 54, from kidney disease.
