= Ty Cobb Museum =

Baseball museum in Royston, Georgia, USA

Coordinates: 34.2832°N 83.1177°W

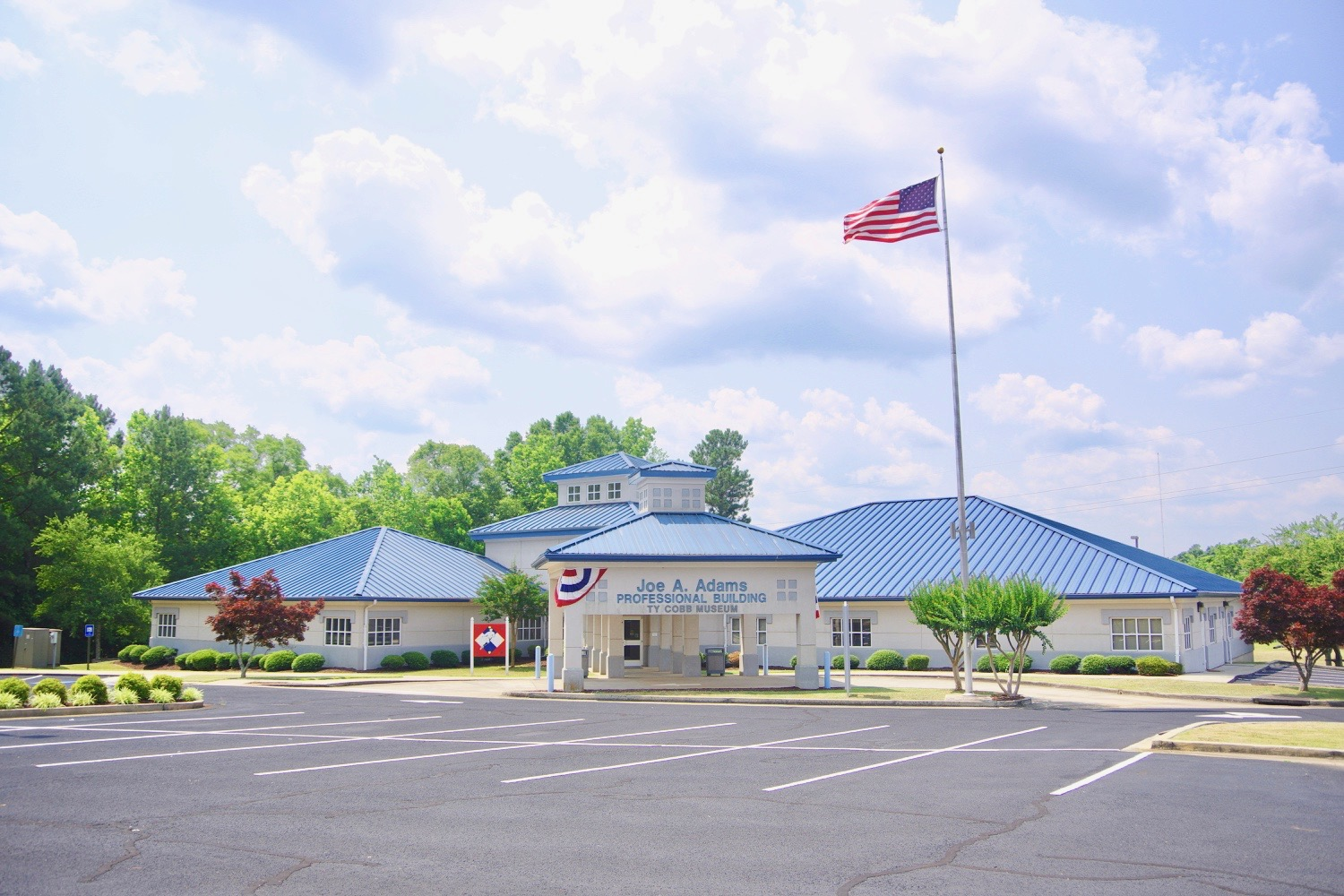
The Ty Cobb Museum in 2019

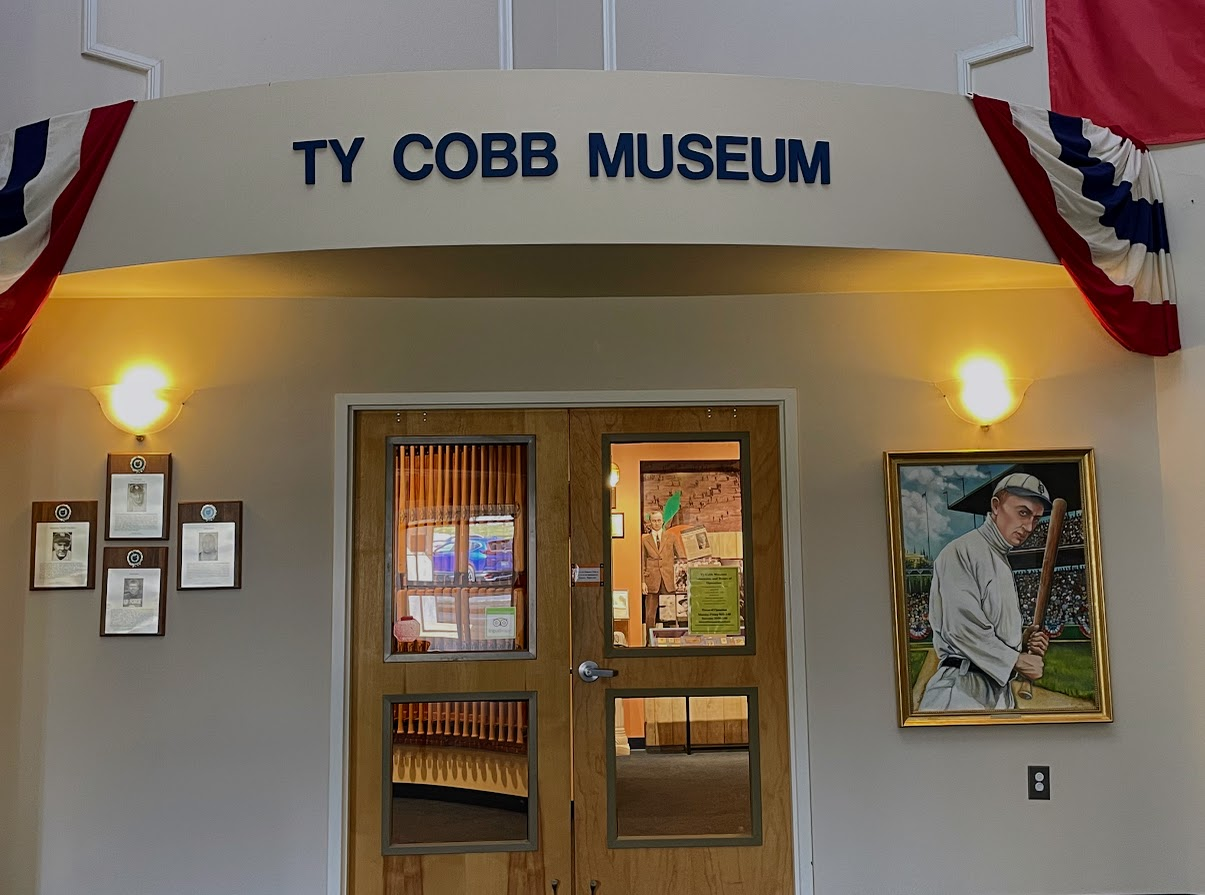
Ty Cobb Museum Entrance- Royston, Georgia, USA

The Ty Cobb Museum is a museum located in Royston, Georgia, that honors Baseball Hall of Fame player Ty Cobb. The museum contains art and memorabilia, film, video, books and historical archives of Cobb as well as several other notable people from Franklin County, Georgia.

The museum opened in 1998. Items on display include Cobb's 1907 American League (A.L.) batting champion medal. The Cobb Theater features stadium-style seating accented by a beautiful mural. A video features the narration of Georgia Bulldogs broadcasting legend Larry Munson, interviews with Atlanta Braves star Chipper Jones and ESPN baseball analyst Peter Gammons, along with rare footage and still photographs of Cobb.

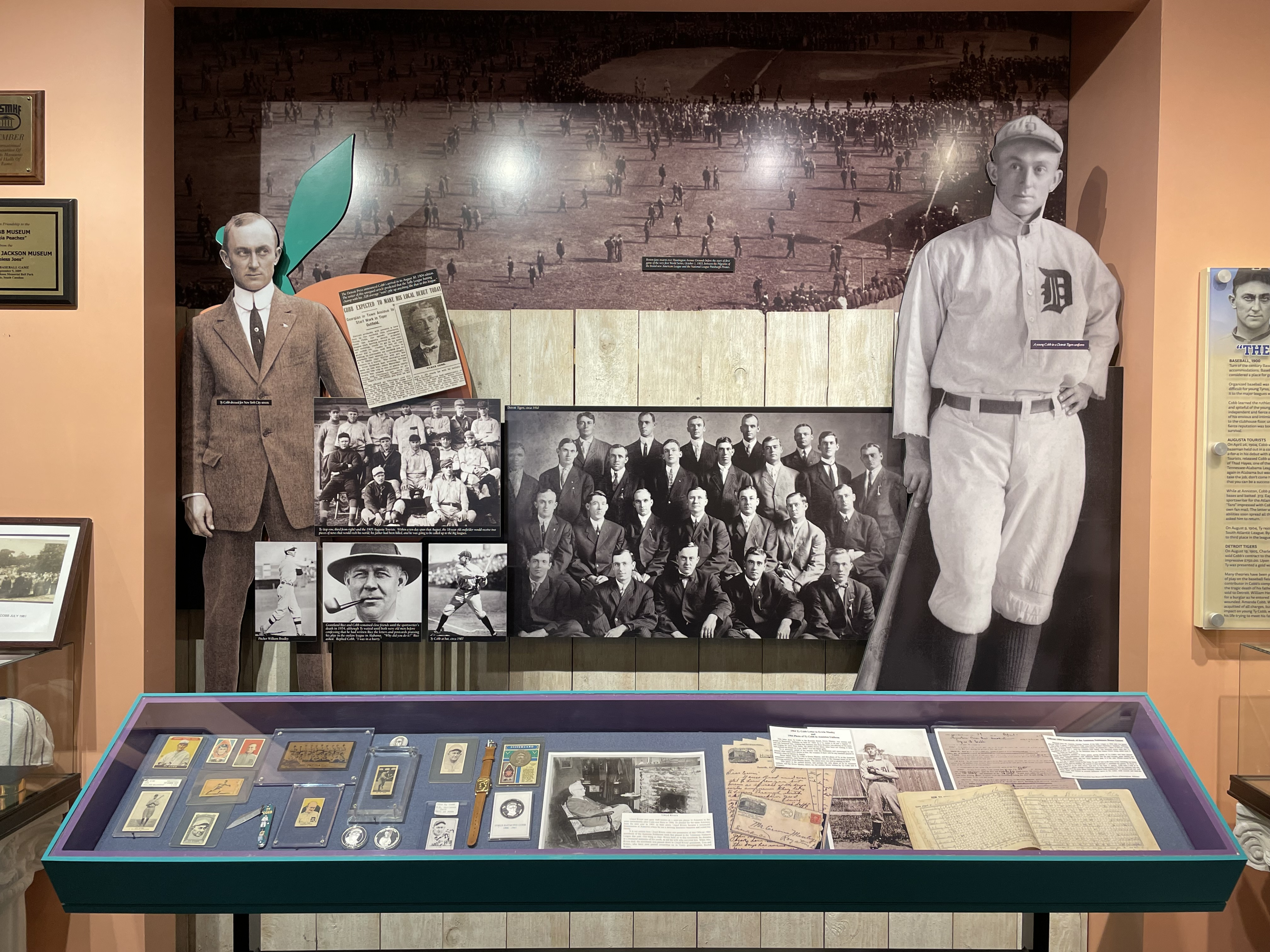
Ty Cobb Museum exhibit

The museum also houses the Franklin County Sports Hall of Fame. Charter inductees are Cobb, 1943 American League (A.L.) MVP Spud Chandler, National Football League Pro Bowl lineman Tony Jones and College Football All-American quarterback Dee Dowis.

== See also ==
- Ivan Allen Jr. Braves Museum and Hall of Fame
- Georgia Sports Hall of Fame
