= Tommy Henrich =

American baseball player and coach (1913–2009)

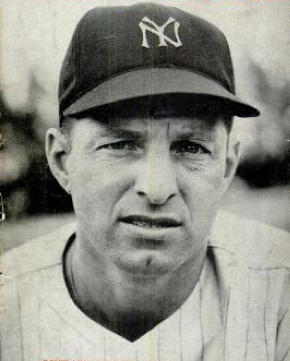
- Henrich in 1949
- Right fielder
- Born: February 20, 1913; Massillon, Ohio, U.S.
- Died: December 1, 2009 (aged 96); Dayton, Ohio, U.S.
- Batted: Left Threw: Left

MLB debut
- May 11, 1937, for the New York Yankees

Last MLB appearance
- October 1, 1950, for the New York Yankees

MLB statistics
- Batting average: .282
- Home runs: 183
- Runs batted in: 795
- Stats at Baseball Reference

Teams
- New York Yankees (1937–1942, 1946–1950)

Career highlights and awards
- 5× All-Star (1942, 1947–1950); 5× World Series champion (1938, 1941, 1947, 1949, 1951)

Thomas David Henrich (February 20, 1913 – December 1, 2009), nicknamed "the Clutch" and "Old Reliable", was an American professional baseball player of German descent. He played his entire Major League Baseball career as a right fielder and first baseman for the New York Yankees (1937–1942 and 1946–1950). Henrich led the American League in triples twice and in runs scored once, also hitting 20 or more home runs four times. He is best remembered for his numerous exploits in the World Series; he was involved in one of the most memorable plays in Series history in 1941, was the hitting star of the 1947 Series with a .323 batting average, and hit the first walk-off home run in Series history in the first game of the 1949 World Series.

== Life and career ==
Henrich batted left and threw left. Throughout much of his career he claimed to have been born in 1916, saying later that this was to make up for the three years that he lost by playing softball instead of baseball. He was signed by the Cleveland Indians in 1934, but was ruled a free agent in April 1937 after he and his father wrote to Commissioner Kenesaw Mountain Landis, who decided that the Indians had illegally concealed him in their farm system. He signed for the Yankees, and also pocketed a $25,000 bonus ($560,000 in current dollar terms). He debuted with the Yankees – his longtime favorite team – in 1937, hitting .320 in 67 games, and gradually replaced George Selkirk in right field. In his first four seasons he posted productive if unspectacular totals, peaking with 22 home runs and 91 RBIs in 1938 and batting .307 in 1940. But on a team which featured Lou Gehrig, Joe DiMaggio, Bill Dickey and Joe Gordon, Henrich's contributions were of a decidedly supporting nature as he competed for playing time with Selkirk and Charlie Keller. In the 1938 World Series against the Chicago Cubs, manager Joe McCarthy placed him third in the batting order; he batted .250 and had a solo home run late in Game 4 as the Yankees swept the Series. He did not appear in the 1937 or 1939 World Series, also won by the Yankees.

=== Breaking out ===
Henrich broke out with a 1941 season in which he had a career-high 31 homers – third in the AL behind Ted Williams and Keller – and was fifth in the league with 106 runs. Facing the Brooklyn Dodgers in the World Series, he singled and scored in a two-run eighth inning in Game 3, and New York hung on to win 2–1. But one of the most famous moments in postseason history occurred when he came to the plate with two out in the ninth inning of Game 4; Brooklyn had a 4–3 lead, one out away from tying the Series. Henrich swung at a full-count breaking curveball for strike three, but catcher Mickey Owen couldn't handle the ball, which got past him (see photo); Henrich began to move toward first base almost as soon as he saw the ball had dropped sharply, and when he saw it get past Owen he took off running. DiMaggio then singled, and Keller doubled to score both runners and take the lead; Gordon later doubled to bring in two more runs, and the Yankees had a 7–4 victory and a 3–1 Series lead. Henrich had a solo home run in Game 5 as the Yankees took the game 3–1, and won another championship.

Henrich made his first AL All-Star team in 1942, but again did not appear in the World Series. He went on to miss the 1943 through 1945 seasons while serving in the Coast Guard in Sault Ste. Marie, Michigan during World War II. While there, he volunteered as the girls' high school basketball coach at Loretto Catholic High School. Upon returning in 1946 he batted only .251, but finished among the league's top ten players in walks (87), runs (92), homers (19) and RBI (83). With Dickey and Gordon gone, he began to bear a greater share of the responsibility for the team's offense in 1947, and came through quite effectively as he formed one of the game's great outfields with Keller in left field and DiMaggio in center. He led the AL with 13 triples and was second with 109 runs and 98 RBI; he was also third in doubles (35) and fourth in slugging average (.485) and total bases (267). Again facing the Dodgers in the Series, he had a pair of RBI in the Game 1 victory, and a solo homer in the 10–3 Game 2 win. He came to the plate with the score tied 2–2, the bases loaded and two out in the fourth inning of Game 7, and drove in Phil Rizzuto with the deciding run in a 5–2 win.

=== Henrich's best years ===
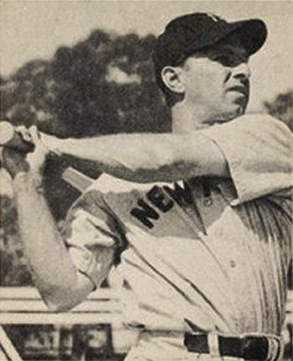
Henrich in 1948.

Henrich then enjoyed his best years, gradually moving from the outfield to first base. He hit .308 with 25 home runs and 100 RBI in 1948, leading the league in triples (14) and runs (138) and finishing second in doubles (42) and total bases (326) and third in slugging (.554); he tied an AL record with four grand slams, and placed sixth in the MVP voting. He was again sixth in the MVP balloting in 1949 after placing third in the AL in home runs (24) and slugging (.526), often getting crucial hits late in the season as the Yankees captured another flag under new manager Casey Stengel. The new skipper succeeded in getting Henrich to avoid outside curveballs by threatening to send him back to the minor leagues, and he picked up two RBI in a 5-3 win over the Boston Red Sox on the season's last day, giving New York the pennant by a single game. He caught the final out when Birdie Tebbetts hit a foul popup near first base. Meeting the Dodgers for a final time in the Series, he gave New York a 1-0 victory in Game 1 when he homered against Don Newcombe on a 2-0 pitch to lead off the ninth inning, the first walk-off home run ever in the World Series. He scored twice in the 10-6 win in Game 5 as the Yankees again took the championship. Henrich was an All-Star in each of his last four seasons.

=== Retirement from baseball ===
Henrich retired after batting .272 with 6 home runs and 34 RBI in a 1950 season during which he was injured most of the year. In an 11-season career, he was a .282 hitter with a .491 slugging average, 183 home runs, 901 runs, 795 RBI, 1,297 hits, 269 doubles, 73 triples and 37 stolen bases in 1,284 games. Defensively, he posted a .985 fielding percentage at all three outfield positions and first base. He was dubbed "Old Reliable" – after a train which ran from Ohio to Alabama – by Yankees broadcaster Mel Allen for his knack of getting a hit just when it was needed. He later became a coach with the Yankees (1951), New York Giants (1957) and Detroit Tigers (1958–1959), and worked as a color commentator for ABC television's baseball coverage in 1965.

In the early 1950s, Henrich had programs on WABC-TV and WCBS-TV, both in New York City. On January 16, 1954, he began a 15-minute program on ABC-TV at 6 o'clock Eastern Time on Saturdays.

=== Later life and death ===
Henrich received the Pride of The Yankees Award in 1987 with Lefty Gomez, presented annually by the club to memorable figures in the organizations' history.

Henrich died at the age of 96 on December 1, 2009, after being weakened by a series of strokes. He is buried in Dayton National Cemetery.

At his death Henrich was the fifth oldest living MLB player and was the last surviving member of the 1938 and 1941 World Champion New York Yankees. There were no living former baseball players who played on the winning team in an earlier World Series. He was also Lou Gehrig's final surviving teammate.

== See also ==
- List of Major League Baseball annual runs scored leaders
- List of Major League Baseball annual triples leaders
- List of Major League Baseball players who spent their entire career with one franchise
