= 1941 World Series =

1941 Major League Baseball championship series

Team (Wins)	Managers	Season
New York Yankees (4)	Joe McCarthy	101–53, .656, GA: 17
Brooklyn Dodgers (1)	Leo Durocher	100–54, .649, GA: 2 1/2
- Dates: October 1–6
- Venue(s): Yankee Stadium (New York); Ebbets Field (Brooklyn)
- Umpires: Bill McGowan (AL), Babe Pinelli (NL); Bill Grieve (AL), Larry Goetz (NL)
- Hall of Famers: Umpire: Bill McGowan; Yankees: Joe McCarthy (mgr.); Bill Dickey; Joe DiMaggio; Joe Gordon; Phil Rizzuto; Red Ruffing; Dodgers: Leo Durocher (mgr.); Billy Herman; Joe Medwick; Pee Wee Reese

Broadcast
- Radio: Mutual
- Radio announcers: Red Barber and Bob Elson

The 1941 World Series was the championship series in Major League Baseball for the 1941 season. The 38th edition of the World Series and the last one played before the entry of the United States into World War II, it matched the New York Yankees against the Brooklyn Dodgers, with the Yankees winning in five games to capture their fifth title in six years, and their ninth overall.

The name "Subway Series" arose for a World Series played between two New York City teams. The series was punctuated by the Dodgers' Mickey Owen's dropped third strike of a sharply breaking curveball (a suspected spitball) pitched by Hugh Casey in the ninth inning of Game 4. The play led to a Yankees rally and brought them one win away from another championship.

The Yankees were back after a one-year hiatus, having won 13 of their last 14 Series games and 28 of their last 31.

This was the first Subway Series between the Brooklyn Dodgers and New York Yankees (though the Yankees had already faced the crosstown New York Giants five times). These two teams would meet a total of seven times from 1941 to 1956 — the Dodgers' only victory coming in 1955 — with an additional five matchups after the Dodgers left for Los Angeles, most recently in 2024.

== Summary ==
AL New York Yankees (4) vs. NL Brooklyn Dodgers (1)

Game	Date	Score	Location	Time	Attendance
1	October 1	Brooklyn Dodgers – 2, New York Yankees – 3	Yankee Stadium	2:08	68,540
2	October 2	Brooklyn Dodgers – 3, New York Yankees – 2	Yankee Stadium	2:31	66,248
3	October 4†	New York Yankees – 2, Brooklyn Dodgers – 1	Ebbets Field	2:22	33,100
4	October 5	New York Yankees – 7, Brooklyn Dodgers – 4	Ebbets Field	2:54	33,813
5	October 6	New York Yankees – 3, Brooklyn Dodgers – 1	Ebbets Field	2:13	34,072

†: postponed from October 3 due to rain

== Matchups ==
=== Game 1 ===
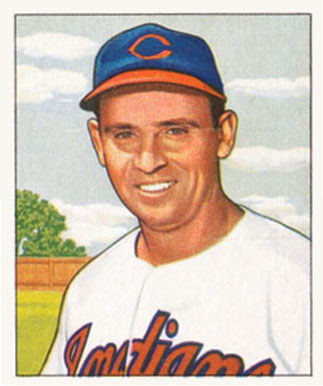
Joe Gordon

Wednesday, October 1, 1941 1:30 pm (ET) at Yankee Stadium in Bronx, New York
Team	1	2	3	4	5	6	7	8	9	R	H	E
Brooklyn	0	0	0	0	1	0	1	0	0	2	6	0
New York	0	1	0	1	0	1	0	0	X	3	6	1
WP: Red Ruffing (1–0) LP: Curt Davis (0–1); Home runs: BRO: None; NYY: Joe Gordon (1)

Joe Gordon's home run in the second inning off Curt Davis put the Yankees up 1–0. In the fourth inning, Charlie Keller walked with two outs and scored on Bill Dickey's double to extend the lead to 2–0. The Dodgers cut it to 2–1 in the fifth inning when Pee Wee Reese singled with two outs off Red Ruffing and scored on Mickey Owen's triple. In the sixth inning, after a one-out walk and single, Gordon's RBI single made it 3–1 Yankees. After a single and error, pinch-hitter Lew Riggs' single scored Cookie Lavagetto in the seventh inning as the Dodgers pulled to within 3–2. Then they threatened in the ninth inning with hits by Joe Medwick and Pee Wee Reese, before Ruffing was able to get Herman Franks to ground into a game-ending 4-6-3 double play.

=== Game 2 ===
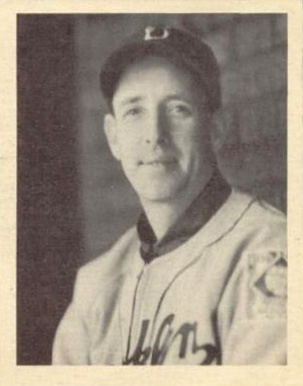
Whit Wyatt

Thursday, October 2, 1941 1:30 pm (ET) at Yankee Stadium in Bronx, New York
Team	1	2	3	4	5	6	7	8	9	R	H	E
Brooklyn	0	0	0	0	2	1	0	0	0	3	6	2
New York	0	1	1	0	0	0	0	0	0	2	9	1
WP: Whit Wyatt (1–0) LP: Spud Chandler (0–1)

The Yankees struck first in Game 2 on Spud Chandler's RBI single in the second with runners on second and third, but Joe Gordon was thrown out at home trying to score to end the inning. Next inning, Charlie Keller's RBI single with two on made it 2–0 Yankees. In the fifth, the Dodgers loaded the bases off Chandler with no outs on a double and two walks when Pee Wee Reese's sacrifice fly and Mickey Owen's RBI single tied the game. Next inning, an error and single put two on with no outs off Chandler, then Dolph Camilli's single off relief pitcher Johnny Murphy in the sixth put the Dodgers up 3–2. Wyatt gave up a pinch single to George Selkirk leading off the ninth, but nailed down a complete-game victory.

=== Game 3 ===
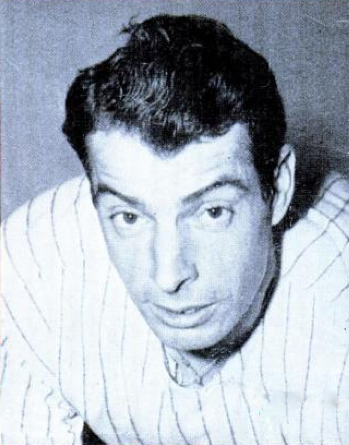
Joe DiMaggio

Saturday, October 4, 1941 1:30 pm (ET) at Ebbets Field in Brooklyn, New York
Team	1	2	3	4	5	6	7	8	9	R	H	E
New York	0	0	0	0	0	0	0	2	0	2	8	0
Brooklyn	0	0	0	0	0	0	0	1	0	1	4	0
WP: Marius Russo (1–0) LP: Hugh Casey (0–1)

With the veteran Freddie Fitzsimmons dueling young southpaw Marius Russo, there was no score into the top of the seventh. With two outs, Russo lined a drive off Fitzsimmons' knee that broke his kneecap. The ball caromed into Pee Wee Reese's glove for the third out, but Fitzsimmons was forced from the game. Hugh Casey, who came out to pitch in the eighth for Brooklyn, promptly gave up four straight one-out singles, the last two of which to Joe DiMaggio and Charlie Keller scoring a run each. The Dodgers made it a one-run game in the bottom half when Dixie Walker hit a leadoff double and scored on Pee Wee Reese's single, but Russo pitched a perfect ninth for a complete game as the Yankees won 2–1.

=== Game 4 ===
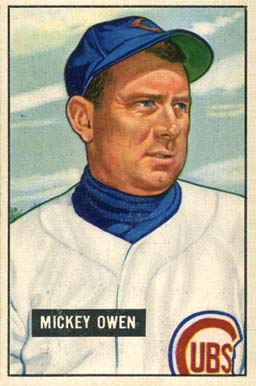
One strike away from winning Game 4, Mickey Owen dropped a third strike on Tommy Henrich, and Yanks rallied to win 7–4.

Sunday, October 5, 1941 2:00 pm (ET) at Ebbets Field in Brooklyn, New York
Team	1	2	3	4	5	6	7	8	9	R	H	E
New York	1	0	0	2	0	0	0	0	4	7	12	0
Brooklyn	0	0	0	2	2	0	0	0	0	4	9	1
WP: Johnny Murphy (1–0) LP: Hugh Casey (0–2); Home runs: NYY: None; BRO: Pete Reiser (1)

In Game 4, the Yankees struck first in the top of the first on Charlie Keller's RBI single with two on off Kirby Higbe. In the fourth, they loaded the bases with no outs on a double, walk and single and two outs later, Johnny Sturm's two-run single made it 3–0 Yankees and knock Higbe out of the game. In the bottom half, Atley Donald walked two with two outs before both runners scored on Jimmy Wasdell's double. Next inning, Pete Reiser's two-run home run put the Dodgers up 4–3, but with two out, two strikes and no runners on base in the ninth, the Yankees rallied off Hugh Casey. First, Tommy Henrich swung and missed at a 3-2 pitch which should have ended the game, but Dodger catcher Mickey Owen failed to catch the ball. Heinrich reached first base after the ball sailed to the backstop. Owen recollected the incident:

It wasn't a strike. It was a low inside curve that I should have had. But I guess the ball struck my glove and by the time I got hold of it I couldn't have thrown anybody out at first. It was an error.

(However, wild pitch and passed ball, by rule, are not included in the definition of "error".)

Joe DiMaggio followed with a single and Charlie Keller hit a double to drive in Henrich and DiMaggio and take the lead. Bill Dickey would follow up with a walk and, along with Keller, score on a Joe Gordon double to make the final score 7–4. Johnny Murphy pitched two shutout innings to close the game as the Yankees were one win away from the championship.

Meyer Berger of The New York Times covered the events in "Casey in the Box", a poem derived from the 1888 classic "Casey at the Bat".

=== Game 5 ===
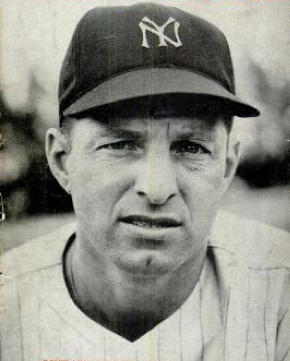
Tommy Henrich

Monday, October 6, 1941 1:30 pm (ET) at Ebbets Field in Brooklyn, New York
Team	1	2	3	4	5	6	7	8	9	R	H	E
New York	0	2	0	0	1	0	0	0	0	3	6	0
Brooklyn	0	0	1	0	0	0	0	0	0	1	4	1
WP: Tiny Bonham (1–0) LP: Whit Wyatt (1–1); Home runs: NYY: Tommy Henrich (1); BRO: None

In the fifth inning, Whit Wyatt and Joe DiMaggio almost came to blows on the mound as DiMaggio returned to the dugout after flying out. Tiny Bonham pitched a complete game four-hitter, allowing only one hit and one walk after the third inning. In the second, with runners on first and third, a wild pitch by Wyatt and RBI single by Joe Gordon made it 2–0 Yankees. Pete Reiser's sacrifice fly in the third with two on cut it to 2–1, but the Yankees got that run back in the fifth on Tommy Henrich's home run. The Dodgers hit only .182 as a team, contributing to their five-game loss.

== Composite box ==
1941 World Series (4–1): New York Yankees (A.L.) over Brooklyn Dodgers (N.L.)

Team	1	2	3	4	5	6	7	8	9	R	H	E
New York Yankees	1	4	1	3	1	1	0	2	4	17	41	2
Brooklyn Dodgers	0	0	1	2	5	1	1	1	0	11	29	4
Total attendance: 235,773 Average attendance: 47,155; Winning player's share: $5,943 Losing player's share: $4,829

== Aftermath ==
In 1947 the Yankees and Dodgers would meet in the World Series for the second time and again play a dramatic Game 4 which was decided on a lead change with two outs in the ninth inning. That time the Dodgers would be on the winning side to tie the series but would once again end up losing it. Ironically, in the 1947 game the Dodgers’ winning pitcher was none other than Hugh Casey – the Game 4 loser in 1941 – even though he pitched to only one batter.

== See also ==
- Subway Series / Dodgers–Yankees rivalry
