= World Series highlight film =

The 1943 World Series between the New York Yankees and St. Louis Cardinals was the first to have an accompanying World Series highlight film. Initially, the films were created as gifts to troops fighting in World War II, to give them a brief recap of baseball action back home.

== Narration ==
Lew Fonseca worked on World Series highlight films from their inception in 1943 through 1969, as an editor and director, and narrated the World Series films from 1949 to 1953 and 1955-58 (Jack Brickhouse narrated the 1954 World Series film.) Television sportscaster Bob Costas wrote of Fonseca's narration: "[his] vocal stylings were somewhat less than mellifluous, but still endlessly entertaining."

Chuck Thompson was the narrator of the official 1966 World Series highlight film jointly produced by both major leagues.

Curt Gowdy was the narrator of several Red Sox highlight films during his tenure in Boston which described the season in depth along with its key moments; this would lead to him eventually narrating World Series highlight films during his time with NBC (1968–1974, '77).

=== Production ===
While 1943 served as the first time that an official World Series highlight film would be produced, 1959 would mark the first time that it would be produced in color. Ten years later, the highlight films would now contain material exclusive interviews, sound from wireless microphones, and camera angles not seen on the live television coverage. Come 1982, the highlight films would become videotaped productions.

Before moving to Los Angeles from New York, David M. Israel was a writer, producer and editor for Major League Baseball, working on such projects as This Week in Baseball, the 1986 New York Mets Highlight Film, and several World Series Highlight Films.")

Jeff Scott wrote every official World Series film from 1988-2014 (with the exception of 1999).

== Home media releases ==
On November 10, 2009, the World Series highlight films were released by A&E Home Video (distributed by New Video) on DVD in Region 1 under the title "The Official World Series Film Collection" for the first time.

The highlight films since 2014 are available for streaming online on Tubi, while some highlight films are available for streaming online on Pluto TV.

== See also ==
- List of World Series broadcasters
