= Spud Chandler =

American baseball player (1907–1990)

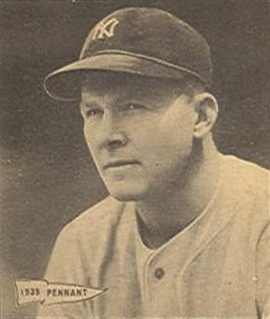
- Pitcher
- Born: September 12, 1907; Commerce, Georgia, U.S.
- Died: January 9, 1990 (aged 82); South Pasadena, Florida, U.S.
- Batted: Right Threw: Right

MLB debut
- May 6, 1937, for the New York Yankees

Last MLB appearance
- September 26, 1947, for the New York Yankees

MLB statistics
- Win–loss record: 109–43
- Earned run average: 2.84
- Strikeouts: 614
- Stats at Baseball Reference

Teams
- New York Yankees (1937–1947)

Career highlights and awards
- 4× All-Star (1942, 1943, 1946, 1947); 6× World Series champion (1937–1939, 1941, 1943, 1947); AL MVP (1943); AL wins leader (1943); AL ERA leader (1943)

Spurgeon Ferdinand "Spud" Chandler (September 12, 1907 – January 9, 1990) was an American professional baseball player. He played in Major League Baseball as a right-handed starting pitcher and played his entire career for the New York Yankees from 1937 through 1947.

He was named the American League's Most Valuable Player in 1943 after anchoring the team's pitching staff with 20 wins and only 4 losses as New York won its third consecutive pennant; his 1.64 earned run average in that season was the lowest by any major league pitcher between 1920 and 1967, and remains a Yankees team record. In eleven seasons, he never suffered a losing record; with a total of 109 wins and 43 losses, his career winning percentage of .717 is the highest of any pitcher with at least 100 victories since 1876.

== Early life ==
Chandler was born in Commerce, Georgia to Leonard Ferdinand Chandler (1871–1942) and Olivia Catherine Hix (1872–1957). He grew up in Franklin County and graduated from Carnesville High School in 1928, and attended the University of Georgia. He played football as a halfback, throwing a touchdown pass to help defeat Yale in a 1929 game dedicating a new stadium. He also pitched for the baseball team and competed on the track team. He was a brother of the Alpha Gamma Rho fraternity and graduated with a degree in agriculture.

== Professional career ==
Chandler spent five seasons in the Yankees organization after signing with the team, his favorite since boyhood. Chandler finally made his major league debut at age 29 on May 6, 1937, and went 7–4 that season with a 2.84 ERA and six complete games (including two shutouts). The following year, he was 14–5, and in 1939 he was 3–0 in 11 relief appearances. Although the Yankees won the World Series in each of those years, Chandler did not appear in the postseason. Bothered by injuries during his early career, after records of 8–7 and 10–4 in 1940 and 1941 he improved further to 16–5 in 1942, finishing third in the AL with a 2.38 ERA and earning his first of four All-Star selections. He was the All-Star Game's winning pitcher in 1942. Chandler had one start in the World Series each year, but lost both times, as the Yankees won in 1941 and lost in 1942.

His greatest year came in 1943. In addition to his outstanding ERA, he led the league with 20 wins in 30 starts, as well as 20 complete games and five shutouts. In 253 innings pitched, he gave up 46 earned runs, allowing only five home runs. Chandler's 134 strikeouts were third in the league, and equalled his combined total of the previous two seasons. He made the AL All-Star team for the second time. Chandler finally had a successful World Series, pitching two complete game victories, including a shutout in the final Game 5, as the Yankees defeated the St. Louis Cardinals. Winning the MVP award, he beat out Luke Appling of the Chicago White Sox. Chandler remains the only Yankee pitcher to win the Most Valuable Player award.

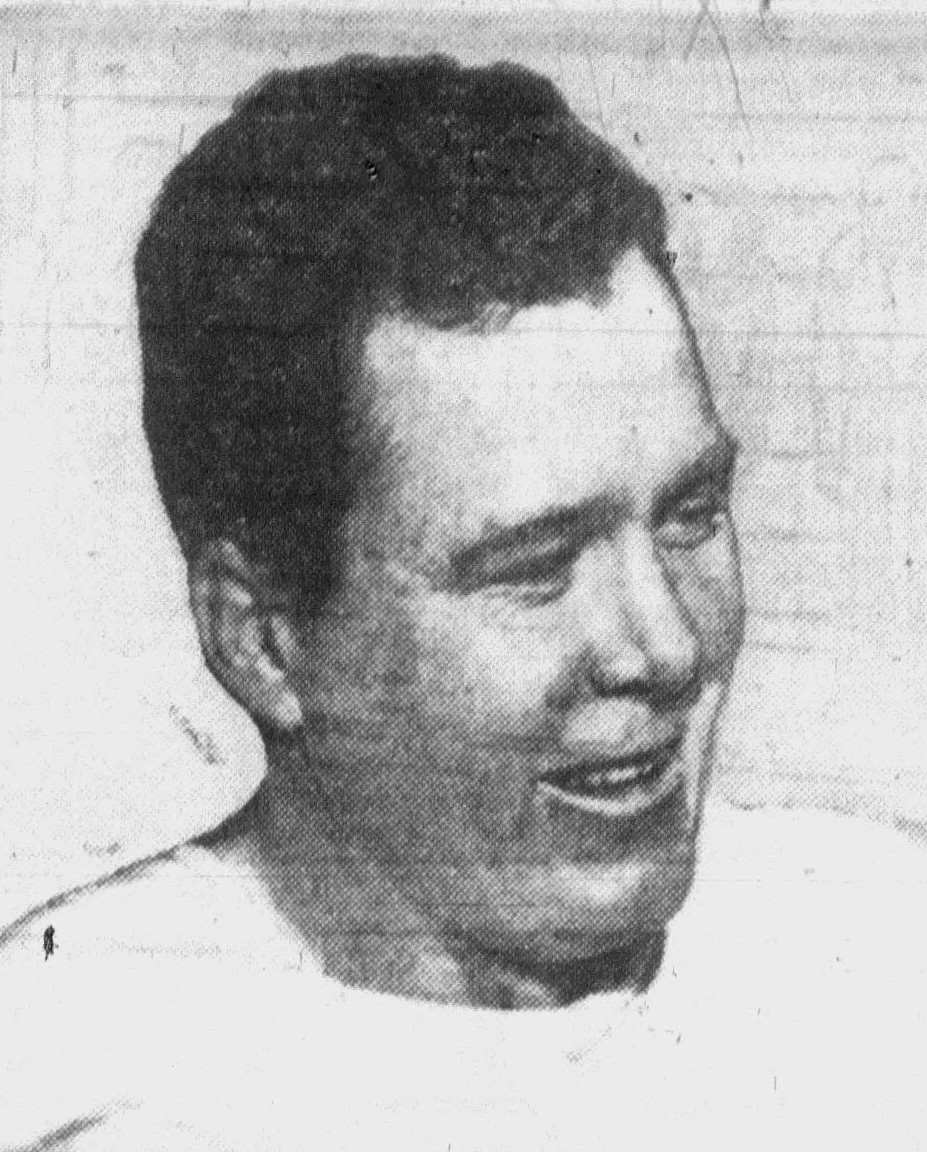
Chandler, circa 1947

After one start in 1944, he entered World War II military service with the Army for nearly all of the next two seasons. He returned in 1946 with another All-Star season, going 20–8 with a 2.10 ERA (2nd in the league to Hal Newhouser) and a career-high 138 strikeouts. That year, he also had 20 complete games for the second time in his career. He earned his last All-Star selection in 1947, but finished the year with only a 9–5 record as injuries ended his career at age 40. He pitched for the last time in the historic 1947 World Series against the Brooklyn Dodgers, pitching two relief innings in a Game 3 loss. In four World Series, he had a 2–2 record with a 1.62 ERA, 16 strikeouts, and 1 shutout.

=== Career statistics ===
Over his career Chandler was 109–43 in 211 games (109 complete, 26 shutouts), with a 2.84 ERA. He had 614 career strikeouts and gave up 64 home runs and in 1,485 innings pitched, allowed 1,327 hits. As a hitter, he had a batting average of .201, with a .234 on-base percentage; he had 110 hits in 548 at bats in his career, and on July 26, 1940, hit two home runs including a grand slam. Chandler was also a fine fielding pitcher, committing only 10 errors in 501 total chances for a career .980 fielding percentage.

=== Coaching and scouting career ===
Chandler later managed in the minor leagues, became pitching coach with the Kansas City Athletics in 1957–58, and scouted for several teams before retiring in 1984.

== Legacy ==
He was inducted into the Georgia Sports Hall of Fame in 1969 and into the Franklin County Sports Hall of Fame in 1997. He would later be inducted into the University of Georgia Ring of Honor in 2000.

== Personal life ==
Chandler married Frances Willard in 1939, and they had three children, one of whom died hours after being born.

Chandler died on January 9, 1990 at Pasadena Manor in South Pasadena, Florida after several strokes, aged 82. He was survived by his wife and two sons.

== See also ==
- List of Major League Baseball annual ERA leaders
- List of Major League Baseball annual wins leaders
- List of Major League Baseball players who spent their entire career with one franchise
