= Georgia Sports Hall of Fame =

Hall of fame in Macon, Georgia, USA

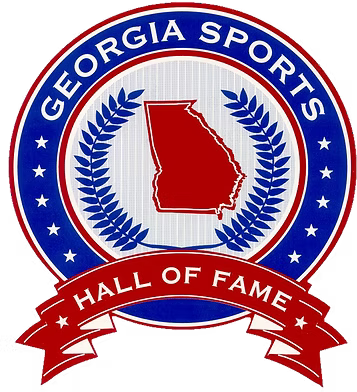

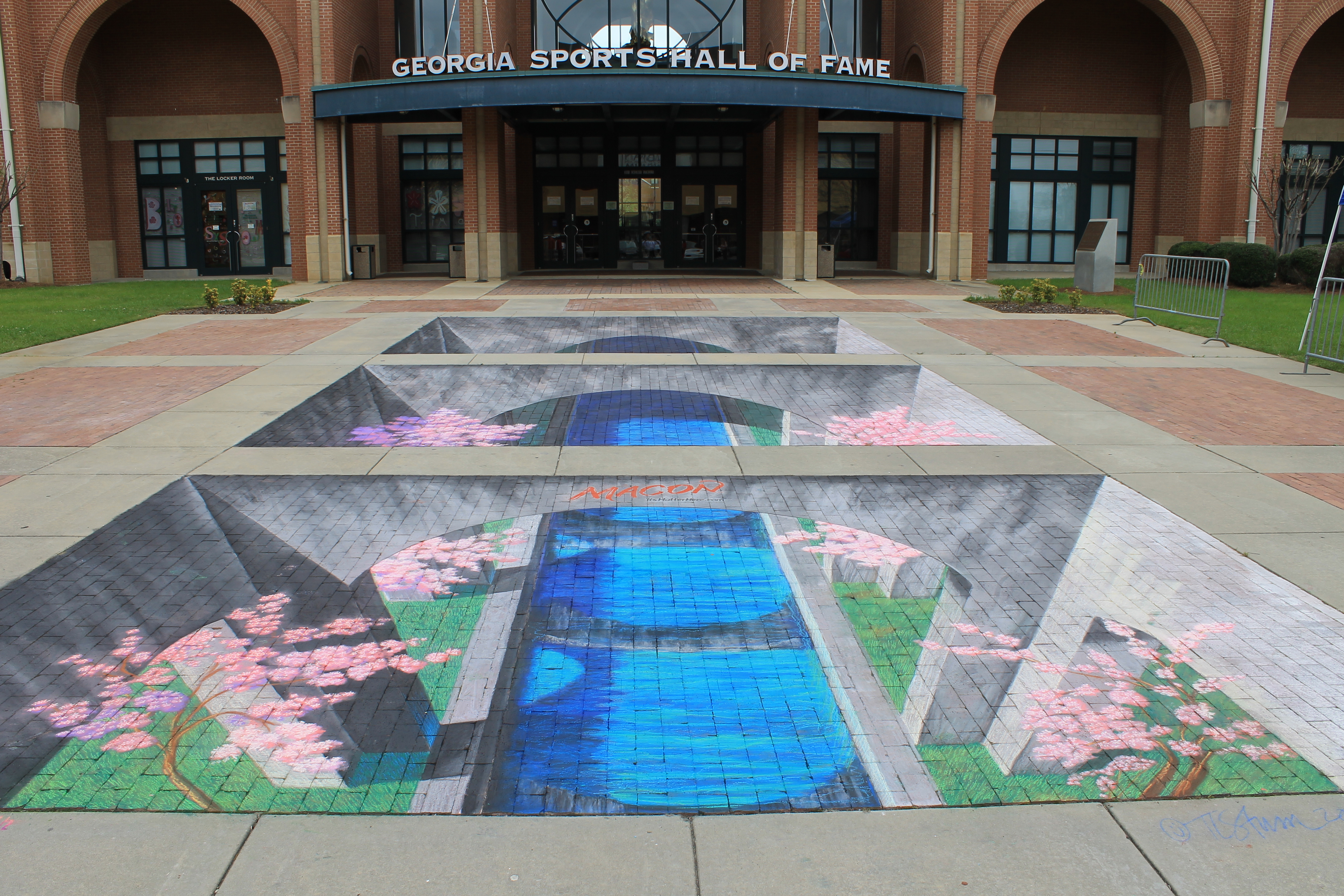
- Front of the Georgia Sports Hall of Fame at the International Cherry Blossom Festival
- Established: 1999
- Location: 301 Cherry Street; Macon, Georgia
- Coordinates: 32°50′4.3″N 83°37′28.6″W
- Type: Sports history
- Director: Gwen Arrington
- Curator: Nathan Jones
- Website: www.georgiasportshalloffame.com

The Georgia Sports Hall of Fame is located in Macon, Georgia. As of 1999, it is the largest state sports hall of fame in the United States at 43,000 square feet (4,000 m^{2}).

== Exhibitions ==
The Hall of Fame houses over 14,000 square feet (1,300 m^{2}) of exhibit space broken down into sections including Hall of Fame Inductees, High School, collegiate sports, Olympic, Paralympic, Professional Sports, and Great Moments in Georgia Sports History areas. Interactive exhibits in the museum include NASCAR simulators, basketball and football games, and computer programs.

== Governance ==
The Hall of Fame is owned by the state of Georgia and operated by the Georgia Sports Hall of Fame Authority. It is governed by an 18-member Authority appointed by the Governor, Lt. Governor, and Speaker of the House of Representatives of the State of Georgia.

== History ==
The Hall of Fame portion of the museum was created in 1956 as the Georgia Prep Sports Hall of Fame. In 1963 it was expanded to encompass prep, college, amateur and professional sports. In 1978 the Georgia Sports Hall of Fame was officially created by the Georgia State Legislature. Then, in 1994 the state of Georgia appropriated $6.5 million to construct the Sports Hall of fame museum, and added another $1.8 million in 1996. The total construction of the building and its exhibits cost $8.3 million. The building opened in 1999 and had more than 65,000 visitors during its first year of operations. Yearly operations are partially funded by the State of Georgia and partnerships with local organizations provide in-kind contributions and relationships. Additional fundraising is continued through facility rentals, a 5k walk, and Hall of Fame induction-ceremony table sales.

== Meetings ==
Meetings for the inductions process for the Georgia State Hall of Fame are now all open to the public. While inductee selection was always public, screening meetings only recently became open and it is considered somewhat controversial. To date, over 300 members have been inducted into the Hall of Fame.

== Rentals ==
The Georgia Sports Hall of Fame has developed extensive rental programs aimed at youth, and area organizations. Youth party possibilities (price varies on number of attendees) include admission to the museum, catering availability, access to chairs and tables, and use of the Georgia room for two hours. Equipment rentals are available for parties including: TV/VCR, overhead projectors, portable screens and easels. In addition to youth parties, the Hall of Fame also offers rentals of the Conference Room (capacity 15), the Georgia Room (in classroom, banquet, reception or theater style), the Rotunda (Banquet or Reception style) and the Theater (205 capacity)

== The building ==
The building itself was built to resemble a turn-of-the-century ballpark, with red-brick exterior and green roof. From the old style ticket booths to the brick columns in the rotunda and special lighting the Hall of Fame was created to put visitors into the heart of a sports experience. Over 1,000 artifacts are on display in the building and over 7,000 objects in the Hall of Fame collection. In addition to the exhibits, the building also houses a 1,500-square-foot (140 m^{2}) "Georgia Room" for rentals and receptions, a gift shop, a 205-seat theater, a research center, staff offices and storage space.

== Inductees ==
With the exception of 1963, 1968 and 1970, the hall has inducted a new class of between four and ten people every year since 1956. The inaugural class in 1956 consisted of Clint Castleberry, Catfish Smith, high school football coaches Selby Buck and Gabe Tolbert, high school basketball coach Joe H. Jenkins and high school coach and administrator John Varnedoe. The first professional athletes, football players Johnny Carson and Stumpy Thomason, were not inducted until the following year. Golfer Louise Suggs became the first woman inducted in 1966. The class of 1974, the sixteenth class in the hall's history, became the first to include an African-American person, Jim Parker.

== See also ==
- Ivan Allen Jr. Braves Museum and Hall of Fame
- Ty Cobb Museum
