= Tiny Bonham =

American baseball player (1913–1949)

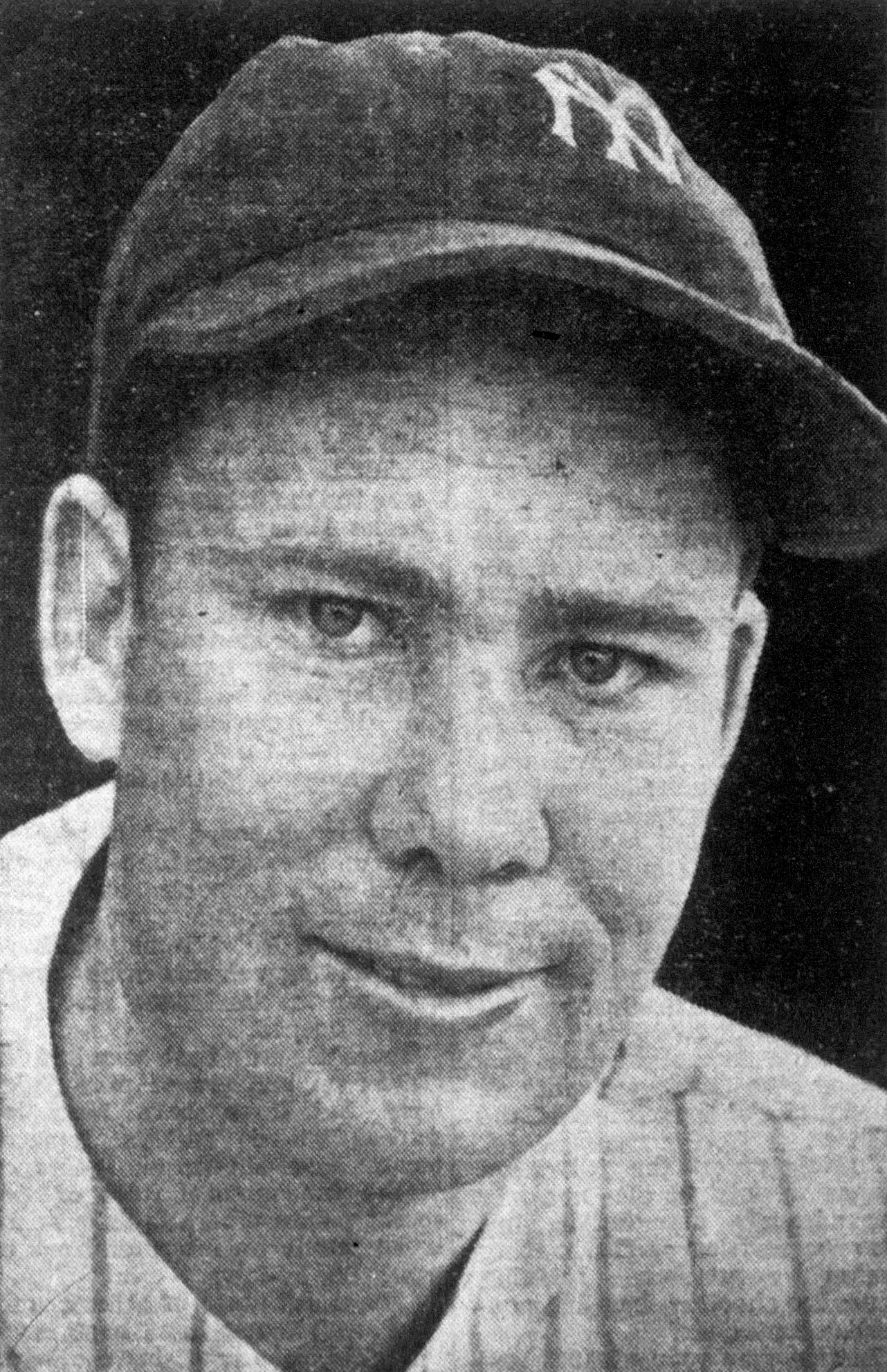
- Bonham, c. 1943
- Pitcher
- Born: August 16, 1913; Ione, California, U.S.
- Died: September 15, 1949 (aged 36); Pittsburgh, Pennsylvania, U.S.
- Batted: Right Threw: Right

MLB debut
- August 5, 1940, for the New York Yankees

Last MLB appearance
- August 27, 1949, for the Pittsburgh Pirates

MLB statistics
- Win–loss record: 103–72
- Earned run average: 3.06
- Strikeouts: 478
- Stats at Baseball Reference

Teams
- New York Yankees (1940–1946); Pittsburgh Pirates (1947–1949)

Career highlights and awards
- 2× All-Star (1942, 1943); 2× World Series champion (1941, 1943)

Ernest Edward "Tiny" Bonham (August 16, 1913 – September 15, 1949) was an American professional baseball pitcher in Major League Baseball (MLB). From 1940 to 1949, he played for the New York Yankees (1940–1946) and Pittsburgh Pirates (1947–1949). Bonham, who batted and threw right-handed, won 21 games for the Yankees in 1942. He was born in Ione, California, and nicknamed "Tiny" because he was an imposing 6 feet 2 inches (188 cm) tall and weighed 215 pounds (98 kg; 15 st 5 lb).

== Career ==
After graduating from Ione High School in June 1934, Bonham signed with the New York Yankees in January 1935 at a rate of $160–$175 per month. Yankees scout Joe Devine signed Bonham to the contract.

Bonham kept opposing batters off balance with an assortment of deliveries. He started his professional baseball career with the Oakland Oaks of the Pacific Coast League in 1935. He worked his way up through the New York Yankees minor league system until 1940, when he was summoned from Triple-A Kansas City to anchor a weak Yankees pitching staff.

Remaining with the Yankees until 1946, Bonham was a pitching mainstay of manager Joe McCarthy's pennant-winning combinations between 1941 and 1943. Bonham supplied his team with the decisive complete game 4-hit 3–1 victory over the Brooklyn Dodgers in Game Five of the 1941 World Series played at Ebbets Field. But Bonham was ill-fated in his other Series starts, losing to the St. Louis Cardinals in 1942 and 1943, both times by 4–3 scores. His most productive season came in 1942, when he led the American League with 21 wins, six shutouts, 22 complete games and a .808 winning percentage. He made the All-Star team that season and again in 1943.

Larry MacPhail traded Bonham to the Pittsburgh Pirates on October 24, 1946 for left-handed pitcher Cookie Cuccurullo and a player to be named later. Rumors suggested that a poor interaction with MacPhail led to the decision, but Yankees and Pirates officials stated that Bonham had already been on waivers.

Although his physical condition was such that he could not be counted on regularly, Bonham provided three solid seasons for the Pirates. After a 1–4 start in 1949, Bonham won six straight games for a floundering Pittsburgh club, including an 8–2 victory over the Philadelphia Phillies on August 27, his final game.

In a 10-season career, Bonham posted a 103–72 (.589) record with 478 strikeouts and a 3.06 ERA in 1,551 innings pitched.

During a September 1949 road trip with the Pirates, Bonham told the team he was suffering from abdominal issues. Upon the team's return to Pittsburgh, Bonham admitted himself to Presbyterian Hospital. Bonham had an appendectomy, which was complicated by intestinal issues, causing a three-hour extension of the surgery. Post-surgery complications made things worse for Bonham, but doctors believed he would recover until a relapse took his life at 11:45 a.m. on September 15. Bonham's body was flown from Pittsburgh to Sacramento, California for the funeral on September 16. Relatives held Bonham's funeral on the morning of September 17 at St. Mary's Cemetery in Sacramento, officiated by Reverend Monsignor Michael Lyons of Sacred Heart Catholic Church. His pallbearers included former Oaks teammate Billy Raimondi and several local dignitaries. Before defeating the Brooklyn Dodgers, the Pirates held a tribute in Bonham's honor on September 16.

== See also ==
- List of baseball players who died during their careers
