= 1944 New York Yankees season =

Season for the Major League Baseball team the New York Yankees

1944 New York Yankees
- League: American League
- Ballpark: Yankee Stadium
- City: New York City
- Record: 83–71 (.539)
- League place: 3rd
- Owners: Estate of Jacob Ruppert
- General managers: Ed Barrow
- Managers: Joe McCarthy
- Radio: WINS (AM) (Don Dunphy, Bill Slater)

The 1944 New York Yankees season was the team's 42nd season in New York. The team finished in third place in the American League with a record of 83–71, finishing 6 games behind the St. Louis Browns. New York was managed by Joe McCarthy. The Yankees played their home games at Yankee Stadium.

== Offseason ==
- Prior to the 1944 season: Jim Greengrass was signed as an amateur free agent by the Yankees.

=== Spring training ===
The Yankees trained in 1944 at Bader Field in Atlantic City, New Jersey. The team made the 300-room Senator Hotel their headquarters and practiced indoors at the Atlantic City Armory.

They played their first exhibition game in Atlantic City on April 1, 1944, and beat the Philadelphia Phillies 5–1, behind a home run by Johnny Lindell. The following day, 4,000 fans saw the Yankees beat the Brooklyn Dodgers, 4–3.

== Regular season ==
=== Season standings ===
American League
Team	W	L	Pct.	GB	Home	Road
St. Louis Browns	89	65	.578	—	54‍–‍23	35‍–‍42
Detroit Tigers	88	66	.571	1	43‍–‍34	45‍–‍32
New York Yankees	83	71	.539	6	47‍–‍31	36‍–‍40
Boston Red Sox	77	77	.500	12	47‍–‍30	30‍–‍47
Cleveland Indians	72	82	.468	17	39‍–‍38	33‍–‍44
Philadelphia Athletics	72	82	.468	17	39‍–‍37	33‍–‍45
Chicago White Sox	71	83	.461	18	41‍–‍36	30‍–‍47
Washington Senators	64	90	.416	25	40‍–‍37	24‍–‍53

=== Record vs. opponents ===
1944 American League record Sources:
Team	BOS	CWS	CLE	DET	NYY	PHA	SLB	WSH
Boston	—	17–5	8–14	10–12–2	11–11	11–11	10–12	10–12
Chicago	5–17	—	14–8	9–13	10–12	9–13	8–14	16–6
Cleveland	14–8	8–14	—	10–12	8–14	12–10–1	10–12	10–12
Detroit	12–10–2	13–9	12–10	—	14–8	11–11	9–13	17–5
New York	11–11	12–10	14–8	8–14	—	13–9	10–12	15–7
Philadelphia	11–11	13–9	10–12–1	11–11	9–13	—	9–13	9–13
St. Louis	12–10	14–8	12–10	13–9	12–10	13–9	—	13–9
Washington	12–10	6–16	12–10	5–17	7–15	13–9	9–13	—

=== Roster ===
1944 New York Yankees
Roster
Pitchers: 21 Bill Bevens; 20 Tiny Bonham; 15 Hank Borowy; 21,28 Spud Chandler; 28 Atley Donald; 14 Monk Dubiel; 18 Johnny Johnson; 24 Al Lyons; 16 Joe Page; 16 Mel Queen; 26 Steve Roser; 30 Jim Turner; 17 Bill Zuber	Catchers: 11 Rip Collins; 22 Bill Drescher; 10 Mike Garbark; 27 Rollie Hemsley; Infielders: 1 Frankie Crosetti; 5 Nick Etten; 7 Oscar Grimes; 12 Mike Milosevich; 6 Don Savage; 2 Snuffy Stirnweiss	Outfielders: 21 Johnny Cooney; 22 Russ Derry; 9 Ed Levy; 8 Johnny Lindell; 9,19 Hersh Martin; 3 Bud Metheny; 19,25 Larry Rosenthal; 1,9 Tuck Stainback; Other batters: 24 Paul Waner	Manager: -- Joe McCarthy; Coaches: 32 Earle Combs; 31 Art Fletcher; 32 Johnny Neun; 33 Johnny Schulte

== Player stats ==
= Indicates team leader

=== Batting ===
==== Starters by position ====
Note: Pos = Position; G = Games played; AB = At bats; R = Runs; H = Hits; Avg. = Batting average; HR = Home runs; RBI = Runs batted in; SB = Stolen bases

Pos	Player	G	AB	R	H	Avg.	HR	RBI	SB
C	Mike Garbark	89	299	23	78	.261	1	33	0
1B	Nick Etten	154	573	88	168	.293	22	91	4
2B	Snuffy Stirnweiss	154	643	125	205	.319	8	43	55
3B	Oscar Grimes	116	387	44	108	.279	5	46	6
SS	Mike Milosevich	94	312	27	77	.247	0	32	1
OF	Johnny Lindell	149	594	91	178	.300	18	103	5
OF	Bud Metheny	137	518	72	124	.239	14	67	5
OF	Hersh Martin	85	328	49	99	.302	9	47	5

==== Other batters ====
Note: G = Games played; AB = At bats; R = Runs; H = Hits; Avg. = Batting average; HR = Home runs; RBI = Runs batted in; SB = Stolen bases

Player	G	AB	R	H	Avg.	HR	RBI	SB
Rollie Hemsley	81	284	23	76	.268	2	26	0
Don Savage	71	239	31	63	.264	4	24	1
Frankie Crosetti	55	197	20	47	.239	5	30	3
Ed Levy	40	153	12	37	.242	4	29	1
Russ Derry	38	114	14	29	.254	4	14	1
Larry Rosenthal	36	101	9	20	.198	0	9	1
Tuck Stainback	30	78	13	17	.218	0	5	1
Johnny Cooney	10	8	1	1	.125	0	1	0
Paul Waner	9	7	1	1	.143	0	1	1
Bill Drescher	4	7	0	1	.143	0	0	0
Rip Collins	3	3	0	1	.333	0	0	0

=== Pitching ===
==== Starting pitchers ====
Note: G = Games pitched; IP = Innings pitched; W = Wins; L = Losses; ERA = Earned run average; SO = Strikeouts

Player	G	IP	W	L	ERA	SO
Hank Borowy	35	252.2	17	12	2.64	107
Monk Dubiel	30	232.0	13	13	3.38	79
Tiny Bonham	26	213.2	12	9	2.99	54
Joe Page	19	102.2	5	7	4.56	63
Mel Queen	10	81.2	6	3	3.31	30
Spud Chandler	1	6.0	0	0	4.50	1

==== Other pitchers ====
Note: G = Games pitched; IP = Innings pitched; W = Wins; L = Losses; ERA = Earned run average; SO = Strikeouts

Player	G	IP	W	L	ERA	SO
Atley Donald	30	159.0	13	10	3.34	48
Bill Zuber	22	107.0	5	7	4.21	59
Steve Roser	16	84.0	4	3	3.86	34
Bill Bevens	8	43.2	4	1	2.68	16

==== Relief pitchers ====
Note: G = Games pitched; W = Wins; L = Losses; SV = Saves; ERA = Earned run average; SO = Strikeouts

Player	G	W	L	SV	ERA	SO
Jim Turner	35	4	4	7	3.46	13
Johnny Johnson	22	0	2	3	4.05	11
Al Lyons	11	0	0	0	4.54	14

== Farm system ==
Level	Team	League	Manager
AA	Kansas City Blues	American Association	Jack Saltzgaver
AA	Newark Bears	International League	Billy Meyer
A	Binghamton Triplets	Eastern League	Gene Martin
B	Norfolk Tars	Piedmont League	Garland Braxton
D	Wellsville Yankees	PONY League	Solly Mishkin

LEAGUE CHAMPIONS: Binghamton
