= 1945 New York Yankees season =

Season for the Major League Baseball team the New York Yankees

1945 New York Yankees
- League: American League
- Ballpark: Yankee Stadium
- City: New York City
- Record: 81–71 (.533)
- League place: 4th
- Owners: Larry MacPhail, Dan Topping and Del Webb
- General managers: Larry MacPhail
- Managers: Joe McCarthy
- Radio: WINS (AM) (Al Helfer, Bill Slater)

The 1945 New York Yankees season was the team's 43rd season. The team finished in fourth place in the American League with a record of 81–71, finishing 6.5 games behind the Detroit Tigers. New York was managed by Joe McCarthy. The Yankees played at Yankee Stadium.

== Regular season ==
=== Season standings ===
American League
Team	W	L	Pct.	GB	Home	Road
Detroit Tigers	88	65	.575	—	50‍–‍26	38‍–‍39
Washington Senators	87	67	.565	1½	46‍–‍31	41‍–‍36
St. Louis Browns	81	70	.536	6	47‍–‍27	34‍–‍43
New York Yankees	81	71	.533	6½	48‍–‍28	33‍–‍43
Cleveland Indians	73	72	.503	11	44‍–‍33	29‍–‍39
Chicago White Sox	71	78	.477	15	44‍–‍29	27‍–‍49
Boston Red Sox	71	83	.461	17½	42‍–‍35	29‍–‍48
Philadelphia Athletics	52	98	.347	34½	39‍–‍35	13‍–‍63

This was the only season between 1925 and 1965 where the Yankees did not finish in the Top 3 of the American League standings.

=== Record vs. opponents ===
1945 American League record Sources:
Team	BOS	CWS	CLE	DET	NYY	PHA	SLB	WSH
Boston	—	9–13	11–11	12–10–1	6–16	14–8	8–14–1	11–11–1
Chicago	13–9	—	11–8–1	10–12	9–12	12–10	8–13	8–14
Cleveland	11–11	8–11–1	—	11–11	12–9	12–6–1	11–10	8–14
Detroit	10–12–1	12–10	11–11	—	15–7	15–7–1	15–6	10–12
New York	16–6	12–9	9–12	7–15	—	16–6	7–15	14–8
Philadelphia	8–14	10–12	6–12–1	7–15–1	6–16	—	10–12–1	5–17
St. Louis	14–8–1	13–8	10–11	6–15	15–7	12–10–1	—	11–11–1
Washington	11–11–1	14–8	14–8	12–10	8–14	17–5	11–11–1	—

=== Roster ===
1945 New York Yankees
Roster
Pitchers: 21 Bill Bevens; 20 Tiny Bonham; 15 Hank Borowy; 28 Spud Chandler; 28 Atley Donald; 14 Monk Dubiel; 25 Al Gettel; 19 Ken Holcombe; 16 Joe Page; 24 Steve Roser; 22 Red Ruffing; 35 Paul Schreiber; 30 Jim Turner; 17 Bill Zuber	Catchers: 16 Herb Crompton; 29,36 Bill Drescher; 10 Mike Garbark; 8 Aaron Robinson; Infielders: 12 Joe Buzas; 2 Frankie Crosetti; 5 Nick Etten; 7 Oscar Grimes; 26 Mike Milosevich; 6 Don Savage; 1 Snuffy Stirnweiss	Outfielders: 27 Russ Derry; 12 Charlie Keller; 8 Johnny Lindell; 9 Hersh Martin; 3 Bud Metheny; 18 Tuck Stainback; Other batters: 22 Paul Waner	Manager: -- Joe McCarthy; Coaches: 31 Art Fletcher; 32 Johnny Neun; 35 Paul Schreiber; 33 Johnny Schulte

== Player stats ==
=== Batting ===
==== Starters by position ====
Note: Pos = Position; G = Games played; AB = At bats; H = Hits; Avg. = Batting average; HR = Home runs; RBI = Runs batted in

Pos	Player	G	AB	H	Avg.	HR	RBI
C	Mike Garbark	60	176	38	.216	1	26
1B	Nick Etten	152	565	161	.285	18	111
2B	Snuffy Stirnweiss	152	632	195	.309	10	64
SS	Frankie Crosetti	130	441	105	.238	4	48
3B	Oscar Grimes	142	480	127	.265	4	45
OF	Bud Metheny	133	509	126	.248	8	53
OF	Tuck Stainback	95	327	84	.257	5	32
OF	Hersh Martin	117	408	109	.267	7	53

==== Other batters ====
Note: G = Games played; AB = At bats; H = Hits; Avg. = Batting average; HR = Home runs; RBI = Runs batted in

Player	G	AB	H	Avg.	HR	RBI
Russ Derry	78	253	57	.225	13	45
Charlie Keller	44	163	49	.301	10	34
Aaron Robinson	50	160	45	.281	8	24
Johnny Lindell	41	159	45	.283	1	20
Bill Drescher	48	126	34	.270	0	15
Herb Crompton	36	99	19	.192	0	12
Mike Milosevich	30	69	15	.217	0	7
Joe Buzas	30	65	17	.262	0	6
Don Savage	34	58	13	.224	0	3
Paul Waner	1	0	0	----	0	0

=== Pitching ===
==== Starting pitchers ====
Note: G = Games pitched; IP = Innings pitched; W = Wins; L = Losses; ERA = Earned run average; SO = Strikeouts

Player	G	IP	W	L	ERA	SO
Bill Bevens	29	184.0	13	9	3.67	76
Tiny Bonham	23	180.2	8	11	3.29	42
Monk Dubiel	26	151.1	10	9	4.64	45
Hank Borowy	18	132.1	10	5	3.13	35
Red Ruffing	11	87.1	7	3	2.89	24
Atley Donald	9	63.2	5	4	2.97	19
Spud Chandler	4	31.0	2	1	4.65	12

==== Other pitchers ====
Note: G = Games pitched; IP = Innings pitched; W = Wins; L = Losses; ERA = Earned run average; SO = Strikeouts

Player	G	IP	W	L	ERA	SO
Al Gettel	27	154.2	9	8	3.90	67
Bill Zuber	21	127.0	5	11	3.19	50
Joe Page	20	102.0	6	3	2.82	50

==== Relief pitchers ====
Note: G = Games pitched; W = Wins; L = Losses; SV = Saves; ERA = Earned run average; SO = Strikeouts

Player	G	W	L	SV	ERA	SO
Jim Turner	30	3	4	10	3.64	22
Ken Holcombe	23	3	3	0	1.79	20
Steve Roser	11	0	0	0	3.67	11
Paul Schreiber	2	0	0	0	4.15	1

== Farm system ==
Level	Team	League	Manager
AA	Kansas City Blues	American Association	Casey Stengel
AA	Newark Bears	International League	Billy Meyer
A	Binghamton Triplets	Eastern League	Bill Cronin
B	Norfolk Tars	Piedmont League	Garland Braxton
D	Wellsville Yankees	PONY League	Bob Crow and Solly Mishkin

LEAGUE CHAMPIONS: Newark
