= 1946 New York Yankees season =

Season for the Major League Baseball team the New York Yankees

1946 New York Yankees
- League: American League
- Ballpark: Yankee Stadium
- City: New York City, New York
- Record: 87–67 (.565)
- League place: 3rd
- Owners: Larry MacPhail, Dan Topping and Del Webb
- General managers: Larry MacPhail
- Managers: Joe McCarthy, Bill Dickey, Johnny Neun
- Radio: WINS (AM) (Mel Allen, Russ Hodges)

The 1946 New York Yankees season was the team's 44th season. The team finished with a record of 87–67, finishing 17 games behind the Boston Red Sox. New York was managed by Joe McCarthy, Bill Dickey, and Johnny Neun. The Yankees played at Yankee Stadium.

== Offseason ==
- Prior to 1946 season: Frank Verdi was signed as an amateur free agent by the Yankees.

== Regular season ==
On May 24, Joe McCarthy, who had managed the team since 1931 and led them to seven World Championships, resigned. Although he had been in ill health, there were also underlying issues with team executive Larry MacPhail and frustrations with the team's performance, especially that of pitcher Joe Page, with whom he had an argument the previous day on the team plane. Long-time Yankee catcher Bill Dickey took over the team. Dickey himself resigned on September 12, and coach Johnny Neun finished out the year at the helm.

=== Season standings ===
American League
Team	W	L	Pct.	GB	Home	Road
Boston Red Sox	104	50	.675	—	61‍–‍16	43‍–‍34
Detroit Tigers	92	62	.597	12	48‍–‍30	44‍–‍32
New York Yankees	87	67	.565	17	47‍–‍30	40‍–‍37
Washington Senators	76	78	.494	28	38‍–‍38	38‍–‍40
Chicago White Sox	74	80	.481	30	40‍–‍38	34‍–‍42
Cleveland Indians	68	86	.442	36	36‍–‍41	32‍–‍45
St. Louis Browns	66	88	.429	38	35‍–‍41	31‍–‍47
Philadelphia Athletics	49	105	.318	55	31‍–‍46	18‍–‍59

=== Record vs. opponents ===
1946 American League record Sources:
Team	BOS	CWS	CLE	DET	NYY	PHA	SLB	WSH
Boston	—	13–9	15–7	15–7–1	14–8	17–5	14–8–1	16–6
Chicago	9–13	—	13–9–1	10–12	8–14	12–10	12–10	10–12
Cleveland	7–15	9–13–1	—	5–17	10–12	15–7	15–7–1	7–15
Detroit	7–15–1	12–10	17–5	—	13–9	17–5	14–8	12–10
New York	8–14	14–8	12–10	9–13	—	16–6	14–8	14–8
Philadelphia	5–17	10–12	7–15	5–17	6–16	—	10–12	6–16–1
St. Louis	8–14–1	10–12	7–15–1	8–14	8–14	12–10	—	13–9
Washington	6–16	12–10	15–7	10–12	8–14	16–6–1	9–13	—

=== Notable transactions ===
- June 17, 1946: Frank Colman was purchased by the Yankees from the Pittsburgh Pirates.

=== Roster ===
1946 New York Yankees roster
Roster
Pitchers: 14,16 Bill Bevens; 20,23 Tiny Bonham; 28,39 Tommy Byrne; 21 Spud Chandler; 18,26 Karl Drews; 25 Al Gettel; 18 Randy Gumpert; 16,38 Frank Hiller; 40 Herb Karpel; 36 Al Lyons; 14,20 Cuddles Marshall; 19 Johnny Murphy; 11 Joe Page; 17,38 Mel Queen; 12 Vic Raschi; 26 Steve Roser; 22,15 Red Ruffing; 26 Marius Russo; 29 Charley Stanceu; 36 Jake Wade; 30 Bill Wight; 17 Bill Zuber	Catchers: 38 Yogi Berra; 8 Bill Dickey; 26 Bill Drescher; 24,37 Gus Niarhos; 7,9,35 Aaron Robinson; 34 Ken Silvestri; Infielders: 3 Eddie Bockman; 7 Bobby Brown; 2 Frankie Crosetti; 9 Nick Etten; 6 Joe Gordon; 7 Oscar Grimes; 24 Billy Johnson; 28 Hank Majeski; 10 Phil Rizzuto; 29,41 Steve Souchock; 1 Snuffy Stirnweiss	Outfielders: 8 Frank Colman; 5 Joe DiMaggio; 15 Tommy Henrich; 12 Charlie Keller; 27 Johnny Lindell; Other batters: 3 Bud Metheny; 3 Roy Weatherly	Manager: 8 Bill Dickey; -- Joe McCarthy; 32 Johnny Neun; Coaches: 32 Johnny Neun; 31 Red Rolfe; 33 Johnny Schulte

== Player stats ==
=== Batting ===
==== Starters by position ====
Note: Pos = Position; G = Games played; AB = At bats; H = Hits; Avg. = Batting average; HR = Home runs; RBI = Runs batted in

Pos	Player	G	AB	H	Avg.	HR	RBI
C	Aaron Robinson	100	330	98	.297	16	64
1B	Nick Etten	108	323	75	.232	9	49
2B	Joe Gordon	112	376	79	.210	11	47
SS	Phil Rizzuto	126	471	121	.257	2	38
3B	Snuffy Stirnweiss	129	487	122	.251	0	37
OF	Joe DiMaggio	132	503	146	.290	25	95
OF	Charlie Keller	150	538	148	.275	30	101
OF	Tommy Henrich	150	565	142	.251	19	83

==== Other batters ====
Note: G = Games played; AB = At bats; H = Hits; Avg. = Batting average; HR = Home runs; RBI = Runs batted in

Player	G	AB	H	Avg.	HR	RBI
Johnny Lindell	102	332	86	.259	10	40
Billy Johnson	85	296	77	.260	4	35
Bill Dickey	56	134	35	.261	2	10
Bud Souchock	47	86	26	.302	2	10
Frankie Crosetti	28	59	17	.288	0	3
Gus Niarhos	37	40	9	.225	0	2
Oscar Grimes	14	39	8	.205	0	4
Bobby Brown	7	24	8	.333	0	1
Yogi Berra	7	22	8	.364	2	4
Ken Silvestri	13	21	6	.286	0	1
Frank Colman	5	15	4	.267	1	5
Eddie Bockman	4	12	1	.083	0	0
Hank Majeski	8	12	1	.083	0	0
Bill Drescher	5	6	2	.333	0	1
Bud Metheny	3	3	0	.000	0	0
Roy Weatherly	2	2	1	.500	0	0

=== Pitching ===
==== Starting pitchers ====
Note: G = Games pitched; IP = Innings pitched; W = Wins; L = Losses; ERA = Earned run average; SO = Strikeouts

Player	G	IP	W	L	ERA	SO
Spud Chandler	34	257.1	20	8	2.10	138
Bill Bevens	31	249.2	16	13	2.23	120
Tiny Bonham	18	104.2	5	8	3.70	30
Red Ruffing	8	61.0	5	1	1.77	19
Vic Raschi	2	16.0	2	0	3.94	11

==== Other pitchers ====
Note: G = Games pitched; IP = Innings pitched; W = Wins; L = Losses; ERA = Earned run average; SO = Strikeouts

Player	G	IP	W	L	ERA	SO
Joe Page	31	136.0	9	8	3.57	77
Randy Gumpert	33	132.2	11	3	2.31	63
Al Gettel	26	103.0	6	7	2.97	54
Cuddles Marshall	23	81.0	3	4	5.33	32
Bill Wight	14	40.1	2	2	4.46	11
Mel Queen	14	30.1	1	1	6.53	26
Marius Russo	8	18.2	0	2	4.34	7
Frank Hiller	3	11.1	0	2	4.76	4
Tommy Byrne	4	9.1	0	1	5.79	5
Al Lyons	2	8.1	0	1	5.40	4
Karl Drews	3	6.1	0	1	8.53	4
Steve Roser	4	3.1	1	1	16.20	1

==== Relief pitchers ====
Note: G = Games pitched; W = Wins; L = Losses; SV = Saves; ERA = Earned run average; SO = Strikeouts

Player	G	W	L	SV	ERA	SO
Johnny Murphy	27	4	2	7	3.40	19
Jake Wade	13	2	1	1	2.29	22
Bill Zuber	3	0	1	0	12.71	3
Charley Stanceu	3	0	0	0	9.00	3
Herb Karpel	2	0	0	0	10.80	0

== Farm system ==
Level	Team	League	Manager
AAA	Kansas City Blues	American Association	Billy Meyer and Burleigh Grimes
AAA	Newark Bears	International League	George Selkirk
AA	Beaumont Exporters	Texas League	Jim Turner
A	Binghamton Triplets	Eastern League	Garland Braxton and Lefty Gomez
A	Augusta Tigers	Sally League	Dib Williams
B	Quincy Gems	Illinois–Indiana–Iowa League	Charles Marleau and Cedric Durst
B	Sunbury Yankees	Interstate League	Walt Van Grofski
B	Norfolk Tars	Piedmont League	Tom Kain
C	Amsterdam Rugmakers	Canadian–American League	Solly Mishkin
C	Butler Yankees	Middle Atlantic League	Milt Rosner
C	Twin Falls Cowboys	Pioneer League	Earl Bolyard
C	Joplin Miners	Western Association	Jim Acton
D	Easton Yankees	Eastern Shore League	Jack Farmer
D	Wellsville Yankees	PONY League	Joe Abreu
D	Fond du Lac Panthers	Wisconsin State League	James Adlam

LEAGUE CHAMPIONS: Augusta
