= List of New York Yankees seasons =

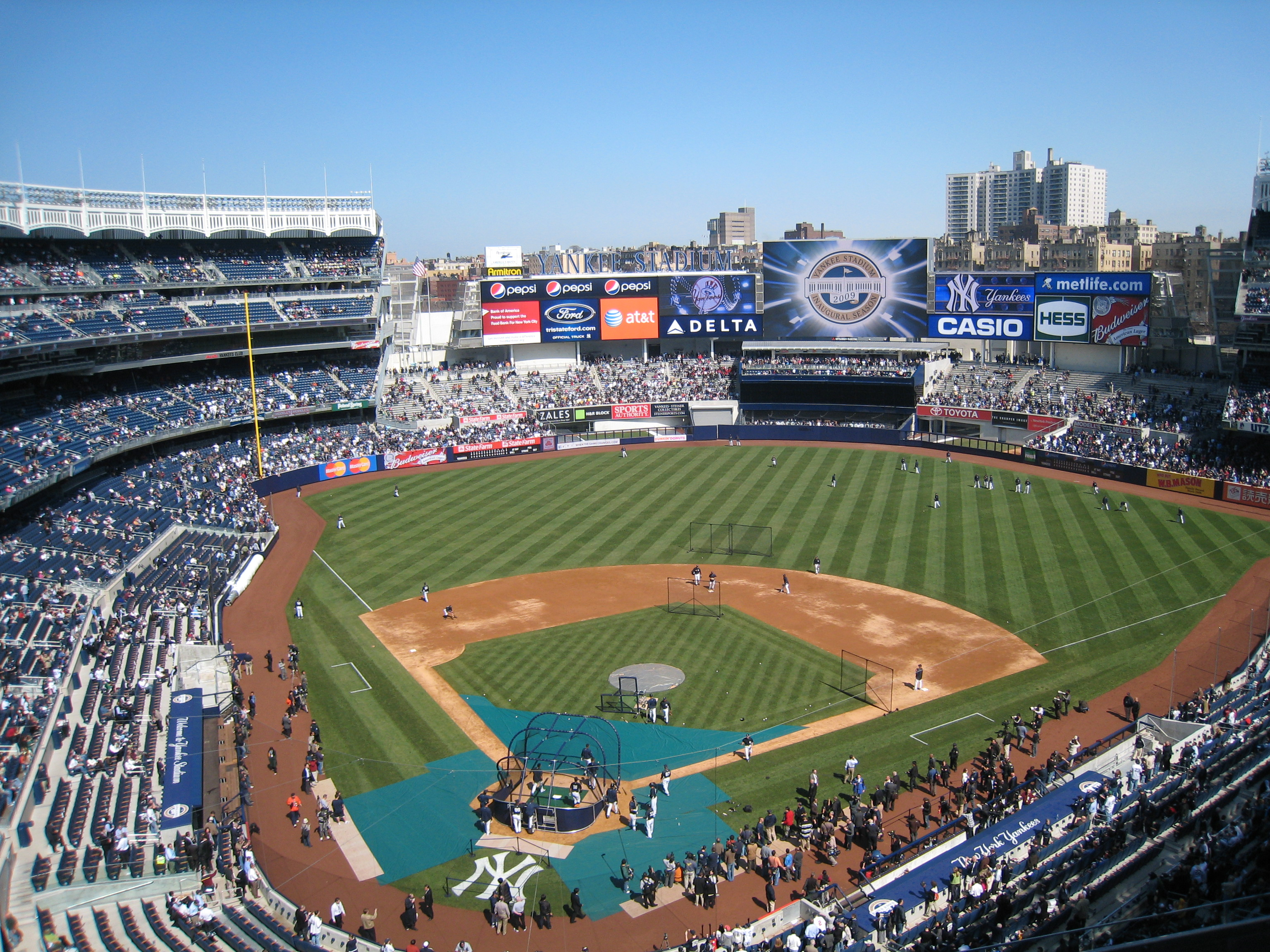
The Yankees have played home games in the current Yankee Stadium since 2009.

The New York Yankees are a professional baseball team based in the Bronx, a borough of New York City. Also known as "the Bronx Bombers" and "the Pinstripers", the Yankees play in the East Division of Major League Baseball's (MLB) American League (AL). In its 124 MLB seasons, the franchise has won 27 World Series championships, the most of any MLB team and 16 more than the second-place St. Louis Cardinals. The Yankees played home games in Yankee Stadium from 1923 to 2008, except for a stint at Shea Stadium from 1974 to 1975 while Yankee Stadium was undergoing renovations. In 2009, the team moved into a new ballpark, which is also called Yankee Stadium.

The Baltimore Orioles began play in the AL in 1901. After two seasons, the Orioles were replaced by a club in New York; it is unclear whether it was an expansion team or a relocated version of the Orioles. Frank Farrell and William S. Devery purchased the franchise, naming it the New York Highlanders. In 1913, the team changed its name to the Yankees. From 1921 to 1964, the Yankees were the most successful MLB franchise, winning 20 World Series titles and 29 AL pennants. This period included streaks of four consecutive championships from 1936 to 1939 and five straight titles from 1949 to 1953.

Following an 11-year playoff drought, the club appeared in the playoffs five times in a six-year period and won back-to-back World Series championships in 1977 and 1978. The Yankees won the World Series again in 1996, and in 1998 began a run of three consecutive titles. From 1995 to 2007, the Yankees made the playoffs each year; their 13-season postseason streak was the second-longest in MLB history. After missing the playoffs in 2008, they won another World Series in 2009, their 27th championship and fifth in 14 seasons. Since 2009, they have reached the postseason in all but four seasons, and returned to the World Series for the first time since then in 2024, when they lost to the Los Angeles Dodgers in the Series after winning the club's 41st pennant.

The 2026 season was their 34th consecutive one ending with a winning record – the second-longest streak for any team in major North American professional sports, only trailing their own mark of 39 from 1926 to 1964. Overall, the Yankees' .570 regular season winning percentage is the highest of any MLB team, and they have the eighth-most regular season wins, behind seven clubs founded in the 19th century.

== Table key ==
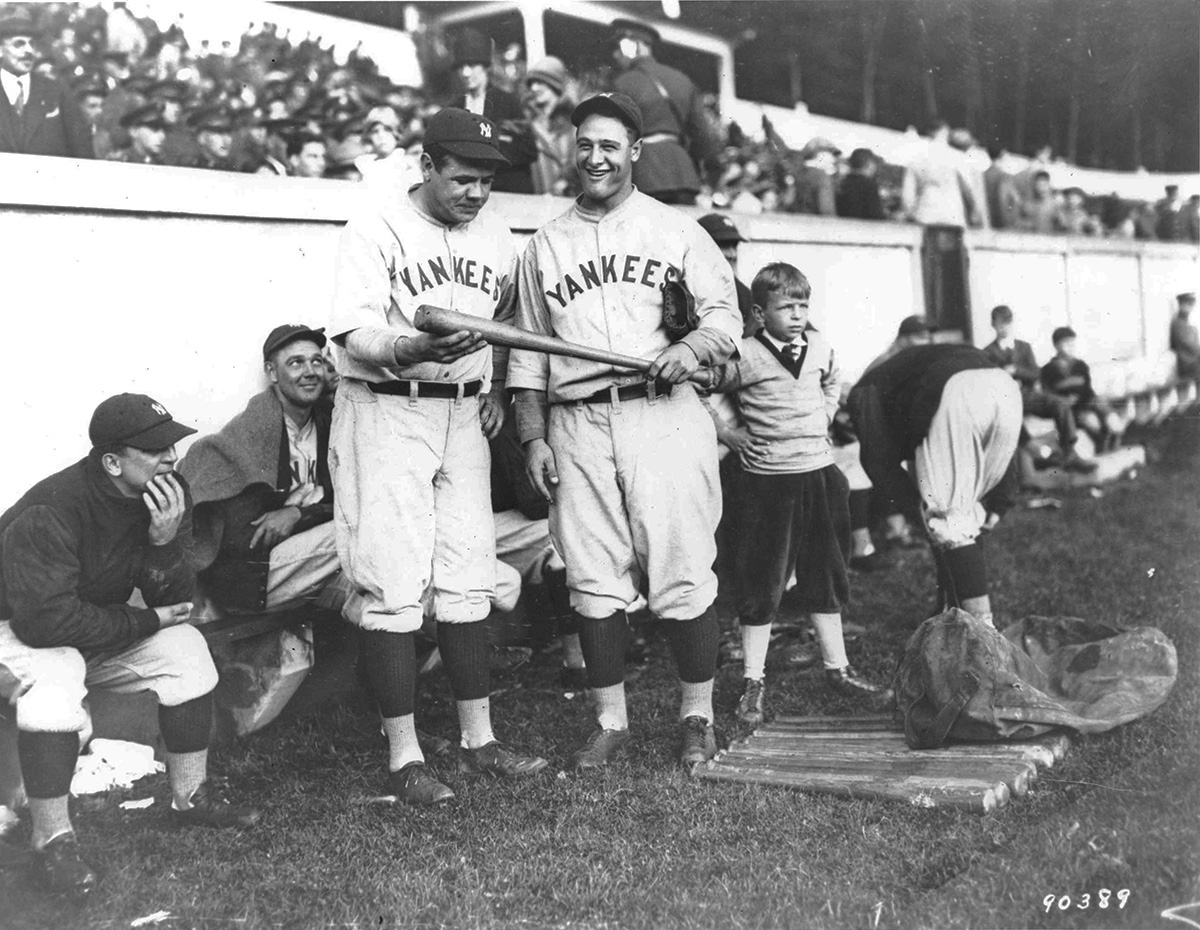
Babe Ruth and Lou Gehrig led the Murderers' Row teams of the late 1920s.

Legend for "Year by year" table below
Term	Meaning
ALCS	American League Championship Series
ALDS	American League Division Series
ALWC	American League Wild Card Game/Series
ASGMVP	All-Star Game Most Valuable Player
CPOY	Comeback Player of the Year
CYA	Cy Young Award
Finish	Final position in league or division
GB	"Games back" from first-place team^{[a]}
Losses	Number of regular season losses
MOY	Manager of the Year
MVP	Most Valuable Player
ROY	American League Rookie of the Year
RPOY	American League Reliever of the Year
Season	Each year is linked to an article about that particular MLB season
Team	Each year is linked to an article about that particular Yankees season
Wins	Number of regular season wins
WSMVP	World Series Most Valuable Player

== Year by year ==
World Series champions (1903–present) †	American League champions (1901–present)^{[b]} *	Division champions (1969–present) ^	Wild card berth (1994–present) ¤

Win–loss records and final positions in league/division standings, by season, with playoff results and award winners
Season	Team	League	Division	Finish	Wins	Losses	Win%	GB^{[c]}	Playoffs	Awards
New York Highlanders
1903	1903	AL	—	4th	72	62	.537	17	—	—
1904	1904	AL	—	2nd	92	59	.609	1½	—	—
1905	1905	AL	—	6th	71	78	.477	21½	—	—
1906	1906	AL	—	2nd	90	61	.596	3	—	—
1907	1907	AL	—	5th	70	78	.473	21	—	—
1908	1908	AL	—	8th	51	103	.331	39½	—	—
1909	1909	AL	—	5th	74	77	.490	23½	—	—
1910	1910	AL	—	2nd	88	63	.583	14½	—	—
1911	1911	AL	—	6th	76	76	.500	25½	—	—
1912	1912	AL	—	8th	50	102	.329	55	—	—
New York Yankees
1913	1913	AL	—	7th	57	94	.377	38	—	—
1914	1914	AL	—	6th	70	84	.455	30	—	—
1915	1915	AL	—	5th	69	83	.454	32½	—	—
1916	1916	AL	—	4th	80	74	.519	11	—	—
1917	1917	AL	—	6th	71	82	.464	28½	—	—
1918	1918	AL	—	4th	60	63	.488	13½	—	—
1919	1919	AL	—	3rd	80	59	.576	7½	—	—
1920	1920	AL	—	3rd	95	59	.617	3	—	—
1921	1921	AL *	—	1st	98	55	.641	—	Lost World Series to New York Giants, 5–3 *	—
1922	1922	AL *	—	1st	94	60	.610	—	Lost World Series to New York Giants, 4–0–1^{[d]} *	—
1923 †	1923	AL *	—	1st	98	54	.645	—	Won World Series vs. New York Giants, 4–2 †	Babe Ruth (MVP)
1924	1924	AL	—	2nd	89	63	.586	2	—	—
1925	1925	AL	—	7th	69	85	.448	28½	—	—
1926	1926	AL *	—	1st	91	63	.591	—	Lost World Series to St. Louis Cardinals, 4–3 *	—
1927 †	1927	AL *	—	1st	110	44	.714	—	Won World Series vs. Pittsburgh Pirates, 4–0 †	Lou Gehrig (MVP)
1928 †	1928	AL *	—	1st	101	53	.656	—	Won World Series vs. St. Louis Cardinals, 4–0 †	—
1929	1929	AL	—	2nd	88	66	.571	18	—	—
1930	1930	AL	—	3rd	86	68	.558	16	—	—
1931	1931	AL	—	2nd	94	59	.614	13½	—	—
1932 †	1932	AL *	—	1st	107	47	.695	—	Won World Series vs. Chicago Cubs, 4–0^{[e]} †	—
1933	1933	AL	—	2nd	91	59	.607	7	—	—
1934	1934	AL	—	2nd	94	60	.610	7	—	—
1935	1935	AL	—	2nd	89	60	.597	3	—	—
1936 †	1936	AL *	—	1st	102	51	.667	—	Won World Series vs. New York Giants, 4–2 †	Lou Gehrig (MVP)
1937 †	1937	AL *	—	1st	102	52	.662	—	Won World Series vs. New York Giants, 4–1 †	—
1938 †	1938	AL *	—	1st	99	53	.651	—	Won World Series vs. Chicago Cubs, 4–0 †	—
1939 †	1939	AL *	—	1st	106	45	.702	—	Won World Series vs. Cincinnati Reds, 4–0 †	Joe DiMaggio (MVP)
1940	1940	AL	—	3rd	88	66	.571	2	—	—
1941 †	1941	AL *	—	1st	101	53	.656	—	Won World Series vs. Brooklyn Dodgers, 4–1 †	Joe DiMaggio (MVP)
1942	1942	AL *	—	1st	103	51	.669	—	Lost World Series to St. Louis Cardinals, 4–1 *	Joe Gordon (MVP)
1943 †	1943	AL *	—	1st	98	56	.636	—	Won World Series vs. St. Louis Cardinals, 4–1 †	Spud Chandler (MVP)
1944	1944	AL	—	3rd	83	71	.539	6	—	—
1945	1945	AL	—	4th	81	71	.533	6½	—	—
1946	1946	AL	—	3rd	87	67	.565	17	—	—
1947 †	1947	AL *	—	1st	97	57	.630	—	Won World Series vs. Brooklyn Dodgers, 4–3 †	Joe DiMaggio (MVP)
1948	1948	AL	—	3rd	94	60	.610	2½	—	—
1949 †	1949	AL *	—	1st	97	57	.630	—	Won World Series vs. Brooklyn Dodgers, 4–1 †	—
1950 †	1950	AL *	—	1st	98	56	.636	—	Won World Series vs. Philadelphia Phillies, 4–0 †	Phil Rizzuto (MVP)
1951 †	1951	AL *	—	1st	98	56	.636	—	Won World Series vs. New York Giants, 4–2 †	Yogi Berra (MVP); Gil McDougald (ROY)
1952 †	1952	AL *	—	1st	95	59	.617	—	Won World Series vs. Brooklyn Dodgers, 4–3 †	—
1953 †	1953	AL *	—	1st	99	52	.656	—	Won World Series vs. Brooklyn Dodgers, 4–2 †	—
1954	1954	AL	—	2nd	103	51	.669	8	—	Yogi Berra (MVP); Bob Grim (ROY)
1955	1955	AL *	—	1st	96	58	.623	—	Lost World Series to Brooklyn Dodgers, 4–3 *	Yogi Berra (MVP)
1956 †	1956	AL *	—	1st	97	57	.630	—	Won World Series vs. Brooklyn Dodgers, 4–3^{[f]} †	Mickey Mantle (MVP); Don Larsen (WSMVP)
1957	1957	AL *	—	1st	98	56	.636	—	Lost World Series to Milwaukee Braves, 4–3 *	Mickey Mantle (MVP); Tony Kubek (ROY)
1958 †	1958	AL *	—	1st	92	62	.597	—	Won World Series vs. Milwaukee Braves, 4–3 †	Bob Turley (CYA, WSMVP)
1959	1959	AL	—	3rd	79	75	.513	15	—	—
1960	1960	AL *	—	1st	97	57	.630	—	Lost World Series to Pittsburgh Pirates, 4–3 *	Roger Maris (MVP); Bobby Richardson (WSMVP)
1961 †	1961	AL *	—	1st	109	53	.673	—	Won World Series vs. Cincinnati Reds, 4–1 †	Roger Maris (MVP); Whitey Ford (CYA, WSMVP)
1962 †	1962	AL *	—	1st	96	66	.593	—	Won World Series vs. San Francisco Giants, 4–3 †	Mickey Mantle (MVP); Tom Tresh (ROY); Ralph Terry (WSMVP)
1963	1963	AL *	—	1st	104	57	.646	—	Lost World Series to Los Angeles Dodgers, 4–0 *	Elston Howard (MVP)
1964	1964	AL *	—	1st	99	63	.611	—	Lost World Series to St. Louis Cardinals, 4–3 *	—
1965	1965	AL	—	6th	77	85	.475	25	—	—
1966	1966	AL	—	10th	70	89	.440	26½	—	—
1967	1967	AL	—	9th	72	90	.444	20	—	—
1968	1968	AL	—	5th	83	79	.512	20	—	Stan Bahnsen (ROY)
1969	1969	AL	East^{[g]}	5th	80	81	.497	28½	—	—
1970	1970	AL	East	2nd	93	69	.574	15	—	Thurman Munson (ROY)
1971	1971	AL	East	4th	82	80	.506	21	—	—
1972^{[h]}	1972	AL	East	4th	79	76	.510	6½	—	—
1973	1973	AL	East	4th	80	82	.494	17	—	—
1974	1974	AL	East	2nd	89	73	.549	2	—	—
1975	1975	AL	East	3rd	83	77	.519	12	—	—
1976	1976	AL *	East ^	1st	97	62	.610	—	Won ALCS vs. Kansas City Royals, 3–2; Lost World Series to Cincinnati Reds, 4–0 *	Thurman Munson (MVP); Dock Ellis (CPOY)
1977 †	1977	AL *	East ^	1st	100	62	.617	—	Won ALCS vs. Kansas City Royals, 3–2; Won World Series vs. Los Angeles Dodgers, 4–2 †	Sparky Lyle (CYA); Reggie Jackson (WSMVP)
1978 †	1978	AL *	East ^	1st^{[i]}	100	63	.613	—	Won ALCS vs. Kansas City Royals, 3–1; Won World Series vs. Los Angeles Dodgers, 4–2 †	Ron Guidry (CYA); Bucky Dent (WSMVP)
1979	1979	AL	East	4th	89	71	.556	13½	—	—
1980	1980	AL	East ^	1st	103	59	.636	—	Lost ALCS to Kansas City Royals, 3–0	—
1981^{[j]}	1981	AL *	East ^	1st	34	22	.607	—	Won ALDS vs. Milwaukee Brewers, 3–2; Won ALCS vs. Oakland Athletics, 3–0; Lost World Series to Los Angeles Dodgers, 4–2 *	Dave Righetti (ROY)
1981^{[j]}	1981	AL *	East ^	6th	25	26	.490	5	Won ALDS vs. Milwaukee Brewers, 3–2; Won ALCS vs. Oakland Athletics, 3–0; Lost World Series to Los Angeles Dodgers, 4–2 *	Dave Righetti (ROY)
1982	1982	AL	East	5th	79	83	.488	16	—	—
1983	1983	AL	East	3rd	91	71	.562	7	—	—
1984	1984	AL	East	3rd	87	75	.537	17	—	—
1985	1985	AL	East	2nd	97	64	.602	2	—	Don Mattingly (MVP)
1986	1986	AL	East	2nd	90	72	.556	5½	—	—
1987	1987	AL	East	4th	89	73	.549	9	—	—
1988	1988	AL	East	5th	85	76	.528	3½	—	—
1989	1989	AL	East	5th	74	87	.460	14½	—	—
1990	1990	AL	East	7th	67	95	.414	21	—	—
1991	1991	AL	East	5th	71	91	.438	20	—	—
1992	1992	AL	East	4th	76	86	.469	20	—	—
1993	1993	AL	East	2nd	88	74	.543	7	—	—
1994^{[k]}	1994	AL	East	1st	70	43	.619	—	—	Buck Showalter (MOY)
1995^{[l]}	1995	AL	East	2nd ¤	79	65	.549	7	Lost ALDS to Seattle Mariners, 3–2	—
1996 †	1996	AL *	East ^	1st	92	70	.568	—	Won ALDS vs. Texas Rangers, 3–1; Won ALCS vs. Baltimore Orioles, 4–1; Won World Series vs. Atlanta Braves, 4–2 †	Derek Jeter (ROY); Joe Torre (MOY); John Wetteland (WSMVP)
1997	1997	AL	East	2nd ¤	96	66	.593	2	Lost ALDS to Cleveland Indians, 3–2	—
1998 †	1998	AL *	East ^	1st	114	48	.704	—	Won ALDS vs. Texas Rangers, 3–0; Won ALCS vs. Cleveland Indians, 4–2; Won World Series vs. San Diego Padres, 4–0 †	Joe Torre (MOY); Scott Brosius (WSMVP)
1999 †	1999	AL *	East ^	1st	98	64	.605	—	Won ALDS vs. Texas Rangers, 3–0; Won ALCS vs. Boston Red Sox, 4–1; Won World Series vs. Atlanta Braves, 4–0 †	Mariano Rivera (WSMVP)
2000 †	2000	AL *	East ^	1st	87	74	.540	—	Won ALDS vs. Oakland Athletics, 3–2; Won ALCS vs. Seattle Mariners, 4–2; Won World Series vs. New York Mets, 4–1 †	Derek Jeter (ASGMVP, WSMVP)
2001	2001	AL *	East ^	1st	95	65	.594	—	Won ALDS vs. Oakland Athletics, 3–2; Won ALCS vs. Seattle Mariners, 4–1; Lost World Series to Arizona Diamondbacks, 4–3 *	Roger Clemens (CYA)
2002	2002	AL	East ^	1st	103	58	.640	—	Lost ALDS to Anaheim Angels, 3–1	—
2003	2003	AL *	East ^	1st	101	61	.623	—	Won ALDS vs. Minnesota Twins, 3–1; Won ALCS vs. Boston Red Sox, 4–3; Lost World Series to Florida Marlins, 4–2 *	—
2004	2004	AL	East ^	1st	101	61	.623	—	Won ALDS vs. Minnesota Twins, 3–1; Lost ALCS to Boston Red Sox, 4–3	—
2005	2005	AL	East ^	1st^{[m]}	95	67	.586	—	Lost ALDS to Los Angeles Angels of Anaheim, 3–2	Alex Rodriguez (MVP); Jason Giambi (CPOY)
2006	2006	AL	East ^	1st	97	65	.599	—	Lost ALDS to Detroit Tigers, 3–1	—
2007	2007	AL	East	2nd ¤	94	68	.580	2	Lost ALDS to Cleveland Indians, 3–1	Alex Rodriguez (MVP)
2008	2008	AL	East	3rd	89	73	.549	8	—	—
2009 †	2009	AL *	East ^	1st	103	59	.636	—	Won ALDS vs. Minnesota Twins, 3–0; Won ALCS vs. Los Angeles Angels of Anaheim, 4–2; Won World Series vs. Philadelphia Phillies, 4–2 †	Hideki Matsui (WSMVP)
2010	2010	AL	East	2nd ¤	95	67	.586	1	Won ALDS vs. Minnesota Twins, 3–0; Lost ALCS to Texas Rangers, 4–2	—
2011	2011	AL	East ^	1st	97	65	.599	—	Lost ALDS to Detroit Tigers, 3–2	—
2012	2012	AL	East ^	1st	95	67	.586	—	Won ALDS vs. Baltimore Orioles, 3–2; Lost ALCS to Detroit Tigers, 4–0	—
2013	2013	AL	East	3rd^{[n]}	85	77	.525	12	—	Mariano Rivera (ASGMVP, CPOY)
2014	2014	AL	East	2nd	84	78	.519	12	—	—
2015	2015	AL	East	2nd ¤	87	75	.537	6	Lost ALWC to Houston Astros	Andrew Miller (RPOY)
2016	2016	AL	East	4th	84	78	.519	9	—	—
2017	2017	AL	East	2nd ¤	91	71	.562	2	Won ALWC vs. Minnesota Twins; Won ALDS vs. Cleveland Indians, 3–2; Lost ALCS to Houston Astros, 4–3	Aaron Judge (ROY)
2018	2018	AL	East	2nd ¤	100	62	.617	8	Won ALWC vs. Oakland Athletics; Lost ALDS to Boston Red Sox, 3–1	—
2019	2019	AL	East ^	1st	103	59	.636	—	Won ALDS vs. Minnesota Twins, 3–0; Lost ALCS to Houston Astros, 4–2	Aroldis Chapman (RPOY)
2020^{[o]}	2020	AL	East	2nd ¤	33	27	.550	7	Won ALWC vs. Cleveland Indians, 2–0; Lost ALDS to Tampa Bay Rays, 3–2	—
2021	2021	AL	East	3rd^{[p]} ¤	92	70	.568	8	Lost ALWC to Boston Red Sox	—
2022	2022	AL	East ^	1st	99	63	.611	—	Won ALDS vs. Cleveland Guardians, 3–2; Lost ALCS to Houston Astros, 4–0	Aaron Judge (MVP); Giancarlo Stanton (ASGMVP)
2023	2023	AL	East	4th	82	80	.506	19	—	Gerrit Cole (CYA)
2024	2024	AL *	East ^	1st	94	68	.580	—	Won ALDS vs. Kansas City Royals, 3–1; Won ALCS vs. Cleveland Guardians, 4–1; Lost World Series to Los Angeles Dodgers, 4–1 *	Aaron Judge (MVP); Luis Gil (ROY)
2025	2025	AL	East	2nd^{[p]} ¤	94	68	.580	—	Won ALWC vs. Boston Red Sox, 2–1; Lost ALDS to Toronto Blue Jays, 3–1	Aaron Judge (MVP)
2026	2026	AL	East	2nd ¤	93	68	.578	4½	Won ALWC vs. Boston Red Sox, 2–0; Lost ALDS to Tampa Bay Rays, 3–0	Cam Schlittler (CYA)

These statistics are from Baseball-Reference.com's New York Yankees Team History & Encyclopedia, except where noted, and are current as of October 7, 2026

== Record by decade ==
The following table describes the Yankees' MLB win–loss record by decade.

Decade	Wins	Losses	Pct
1900s	520	518	.501
1910s	701	780	.473
1920s	933	602	.608
1930s	970	554	.636
1940s	929	609	.604
1950s	955	582	.621
1960s	887	720	.552
1970s	892	715	.555
1980s	854	708	.547
1990s	851	702	.548
2000s	965	651	.597
2010s	921	699	.569
2020s	587	444	.569
All-time	10,965	8,284	.570

These statistics are from Baseball-Reference.com's New York Yankees Team History & Encyclopedia, and are current as of October 9, 2025.

== Postseason record by year ==
The Yankees have made the postseason 61 times in their history; the first was in 1921 and the most recent was in 2026.

Postseason record by year
Year	Finish	Round	Opponent	Result		
1921	American League Champions	World Series	New York Giants	Lost	3	5
1922	American League Champions	World Series	New York Giants	Lost	0	4
1923	World Series Champions	World Series	New York Giants	Won	4	2
1926	American League Champions	World Series	St Louis Cardinals	Lost	3	4
1927	World Series Champions	World Series	Pittsburgh Pirates	Won	4	0
1928	World Series Champions	World Series	St Louis Cardinals	Won	4	0
1932	World Series Champions	World Series	Chicago Cubs	Won	4	0
1936	World Series Champions	World Series	New York Giants	Won	4	2
1937	World Series Champions	World Series	New York Giants	Won	4	1
1938	World Series Champions	World Series	Chicago Cubs	Won	4	0
1939	World Series Champions	World Series	Cincinnati Reds	Won	4	0
1941	World Series Champions	World Series	Brooklyn Dodgers	Won	4	1
1942	American League Champions	World Series	St Louis Cardinals	Lost	1	4
1943	World Series Champions	World Series	Brooklyn Dodgers	Won	4	1
1947	World Series Champions	World Series	Brooklyn Dodgers	Won	4	3
1949	World Series Champions	World Series	Brooklyn Dodgers	Won	4	1
1950	World Series Champions	World Series	Philadelphia Phillies	Won	4	0
1951	World Series Champions	World Series	New York Giants	Won	4	2
1952	World Series Champions	World Series	Brooklyn Dodgers	Won	4	3
1953	World Series Champions	World Series	Brooklyn Dodgers	Won	4	2
1955	American League Champions	World Series	Brooklyn Dodgers	Lost	3	4
1956	World Series Champions	World Series	Brooklyn Dodgers	Won	4	3
1957	American League Champions	World Series	Milwaukee Braves	Lost	3	4
1958	World Series Champions	World Series	Milwaukee Braves	Won	4	3
1960	American League Champions	World Series	Pittsburgh Pirates	Lost	3	4
1961	World Series Champions	World Series	Cincinnati Reds	Won	4	1
1962	World Series Champions	World Series	San Francisco Giants	Won	4	3
1963	American League Champions	World Series	Los Angeles Dodgers	Lost	0	4
1964	American League Champions	World Series	St Louis Cardinals	Lost	3	4
1976	American League Champions	ALCS	Kansas City Royals	Won	3	2
1976	American League Champions	World Series	Cincinnati Reds	Lost	0	4
1977	World Series Champions	ALCS	Kansas City Royals	Won	3	2
1977	World Series Champions	World Series	Los Angeles Dodgers	Won	4	2
1978	World Series Champions	ALCS	Kansas City Royals	Won	3	1
1978	World Series Champions	World Series	Los Angeles Dodgers	Won	4	2
1980	American League East Champions	ALCS	Kansas City Royals	Lost	0	3
1981	American League Champions	ALDS	Milwaukee Brewers	Won	3	2
1981	American League Champions	ALCS	Oakland Athletics	Won	3	0
1981	American League Champions	World Series	Los Angeles Dodgers	Lost	2	4
1995	American League Wild Card	ALDS	Seattle Mariners	Lost	2	3
1996	World Series Champions	ALDS	Texas Rangers	Won	3	1
1996	World Series Champions	ALCS	Baltimore Orioles	Won	4	1
1996	World Series Champions	World Series	Atlanta Braves	Won	4	2
1997	American League Wild Card	ALDS	Cleveland Indians	Lost	2	3
1998	World Series Champions	ALDS	Texas Rangers	Won	3	0
1998	World Series Champions	ALCS	Cleveland Indians	Won	4	2
1998	World Series Champions	World Series	San Diego Padres	Won	4	0
1999	World Series Champions	ALDS	Texas Rangers	Won	3	0
1999	World Series Champions	ALCS	Boston Red Sox	Won	4	1
1999	World Series Champions	World Series	Atlanta Braves	Won	4	0
2000	World Series Champions	ALDS	Oakland Athletics	Won	3	2
2000	World Series Champions	ALCS	Seattle Mariners	Won	4	2
2000	World Series Champions	World Series	New York Mets	Won	4	1
2001	American League Champions	ALDS	Oakland Athletics	Won	3	2
2001	American League Champions	ALCS	Seattle Mariners	Won	4	1
2001	American League Champions	World Series	Arizona Diamondbacks	Lost	3	4
2002	American League East Champions	ALDS	Anaheim Angels	Lost	1	3
2003	American League Champions	ALDS	Minnesota Twins	Won	3	1
2003	American League Champions	ALCS	Boston Red Sox	Won	4	3
2003	American League Champions	World Series	Florida Marlins	Lost	2	4
2004	American League East Champions	ALDS	Minnesota Twins	Won	3	1
2004	American League East Champions	ALCS	Boston Red Sox	Lost	3	4
2005	American League East Champions	ALDS	Los Angeles Angels of Anaheim	Lost	2	3
2006	American League East Champions	ALDS	Detroit Tigers	Lost	1	3
2007	American League Wild Card	ALDS	Cleveland Indians	Lost	1	3
2009	World Series Champions	ALDS	Minnesota Twins	Won	3	0
2009	World Series Champions	ALCS	Los Angeles Angels of Anaheim	Won	4	2
2009	World Series Champions	World Series	Philadelphia Phillies	Won	4	2
2010	American League Wild Card	ALDS	Minnesota Twins	Won	3	0
2010	American League Wild Card	ALCS	Texas Rangers	Lost	2	4
2011	American League East Champions	ALDS	Detroit Tigers	Lost	2	3
2012	American League East Champions	ALDS	Baltimore Orioles	Won	3	2
2012	American League East Champions	ALCS	Detroit Tigers	Lost	0	4
2015	American League Wild Card	ALWC	Houston Astros	Lost	0	1
2017	American League Wild Card	ALWC	Minnesota Twins	Won	1	0
2017	American League Wild Card	ALDS	Cleveland Indians	Won	3	2
2017	American League Wild Card	ALCS	Houston Astros	Lost	3	4
2018	American League Wild Card	ALWC	Oakland Athletics	Won	1	0
2018	American League Wild Card	ALDS	Boston Red Sox	Lost	1	3
2019	American League East Champions	ALDS	Minnesota Twins	Won	3	0
2019	American League East Champions	ALCS	Houston Astros	Lost	2	4
2020	American League Wild Card	ALWC	Cleveland Indians	Won	2	0
2020	American League Wild Card	ALDS	Tampa Bay Rays	Lost	2	3
2021	American League Wild Card	ALWC	Boston Red Sox	Lost	0	1
2022	American League East Champions	ALDS	Cleveland Guardians	Won	3	2
2022	American League East Champions	ALCS	Houston Astros	Lost	0	4
2024	American League Champions	ALDS	Kansas City Royals	Won	3	1
2024	American League Champions	ALCS	Cleveland Guardians	Won	4	1
2024	American League Champions	World Series	Los Angeles Dodgers	Lost	1	4
2025	American League Wild Card	ALWC	Boston Red Sox	Won	2	1
2025	American League Wild Card	ALDS	Toronto Blue Jays	Lost	1	3
2026	American League Wild Card	ALWC	Boston Red Sox	Won	2	0
2026	American League Wild Card	ALDS	Tampa Bay Rays	Lost	0	3
61	Totals			59-34	257	191

== All-time records ==
Statistic	Wins	Losses	Win%
All-time regular season record	10,965	8,284	.570
All-time postseason record	257	191	.574
All-time regular and postseason record	11,222	8,475	.570

== Notes ==
- ^{a} This is determined by calculating the difference in wins plus the difference in losses divided by two.
- ^{b} For lists of all American League pennant winners, see American League pennant winners 1901–68 and American League Championship Series.
- ^{c} Half-game increments are possible because games can be cancelled due to inclement weather or other circumstances that prevent play. If a postponed game is the last of the season between two teams, it may not be made up, if it does not affect the playoff race.
- ^{d} The second game of the series ended after 10 innings due to darkness, with the score tied 2–2.
- ^{e} During Game 3 of this series, Babe Ruth hit his called shot, a home run into the center field bleachers of Wrigley Field.
- ^{f} Don Larsen pitched the only perfect game in World Series history in Game 5.
- ^{g} In 1969, the American League split into East and West divisions.
- ^{h} The 1972 Major League Baseball strike forced the cancellation of the Yankees' first seven games of the season.
- ^{i} The Yankees finished the season tied for first with the Boston Red Sox. New York defeated the Red Sox 5–4 in a one-game playoff to clinch the division title. The game is best remembered for Bucky Dent's three-run home run in the seventh inning, which gave the Yankees a 3–2 lead.
- ^{j} The 1981 Major League Baseball strike caused the season to be split into two halves. The Yankees were given a berth in an expanded playoff tournament because they led the American League East when the strike began. The Milwaukee Brewers finished the second half in first place to earn the division's other playoff berth.
- ^{k} The 1994–95 Major League Baseball strike, which started on August 12, 1994, led to the cancellation of the playoffs and World Series. As a result of the abbreviated season, MLB did not officially award division championships. The Yankees led the American League East, and held the best record in the American League, at the time of the strike.
- ^{l} The 1994–95 MLB strike lasted until April 2, 1995, causing the shortening of the 1995 season to 144 games.
- ^{m} The Yankees finished the season tied for first with the Boston Red Sox, but were awarded the division title because they won the season series with the Red Sox.
- ^{n} The Yankees finished the season tied for third with the Baltimore Orioles.
- ^{o} The 2020 season was shortened to 60 games by the COVID-19 pandemic.
- ^{p} The Yankees finished the season tied for second with the Boston Red Sox. Since both teams qualified for the American League Wild Card Game, the tie had to be broken to determine home-field advantage. The Red Sox were designated the first wild card, and the Yankees were designated the second wild card, based on the Red Sox having won the season series between the teams, 10 games to 9.
- ^{p} The Yankees finished the season tied for first with the Toronto Blue Jays, but lost the division after Toronto won the regular season series 8–5.
