= Bader Field (ballpark) =

Sports stadium in Atlantic City, New Jersey, United States

- Interactive map of Bader Field
- Location: Atlantic City, New Jersey, United States
- Coordinates: 39°21′29.76″N 74°27′31.75″W
- Owner: City of Atlantic City
- Surface: Grass
- Field size: Left – ft. Center – ft. Right – ft.

Tenants
- Atlantic City Roses (1921–1927); New York Yankees (MLB) (spring training) (1944–1945); Boston Red Sox (MLB) (spring training) (1945)

Bader Field was a baseball stadium in Atlantic City, New Jersey, United States. It was located at the Bader Field airport and was referred to by the same name as the airfield. It was named after the former mayor of Atlantic City Edward L. Bader, who purchased the land for the airfield.

The Philadelphia Eagles trained at Bader Field in September 1933 prior to their inaugural season.

The New York Yankees held spring training at Bader Field in 1944. The Philadelphia Athletics considered using the ballpark for 1944 spring training. On November 17, 1943, Connie Mack examined Bader Field and the National Guard Armory as one possibility. But he knew the Yankees were already considering it. The A's went to McCurdy Field in Frederick, Maryland when the Yankees chose Atlantic City. The Yankees made the 300-room Senator Hotel their headquarters and practiced indoors at the Atlantic City Armory. They played their first exhibition game in Atlantic City on April 1, 1944, and beat the Philadelphia Phillies 5-1, behind a home run by Johnny Lindell. The following day, 4,000 fans saw the Yankees beat the Brooklyn Dodgers, 4–3. In 1945, the Boston Red Sox based their spring training at Ansley Park in nearby Pleasantville. The last spring exhibition played at Bader Field was a Red Sox-Yankees game on April 8, 1945.

A municipal stadium, John Boyd Stadium, with a football field and track was opened at Bader Field on October 22, 1949. It stood just north of the ballpark's left-field wall and was built at a cost of $350,000. John Boyd Stadium was the home of Atlantic City High School football from 1949 until 1994, and was demolished in February 1998. In 1998, The Sandcastle baseball stadium was built at Bader Field, returning professional baseball to the airport site. The Atlantic City Surf played at the ballpark through 2008. The ballpark sits unused today amid discussions of redevelopment.

== See also ==
- Bacharach Giants
- Bader Field
- Bernie Robbins Stadium
