= Rip Collins =

Rip Collins may refer to:

- Rip Collins (pitcher) (1896–1968), American Major League Baseball player
- Rip Collins (catcher) (1909–1969), American Major League Baseball backup catcher
- Albin Collins (born 1927), American National Football League player

== See also ==
- Ripper Collins (baseball) (1904–1970), American Major League Baseball first baseman
- Ripper Collins (wrestler) (1933–1991), American professional wrestler
- Collins (surname)
