= Atlantic City Armory =

Armory and sports venue in Atlantic City, New Jersey

Coordinates: 39.36340°N 74.43911°W

Atlantic City Armory is an armory at 1008 Absecon Boulevard in Atlantic City, New Jersey.

For the 1944 season the New York Yankees held spring training in Atlantic City. They made the 300-room Senator Hotel their headquarters, trained indoors at the armory and played at Bader Field.

In 2009 it was announced that the armory would be renovated and transformed in a youth recreation center. The $2.9 million in funding for the project was provided by the New Jersey Department of Military and Veterans Affairs, the New Jersey Department of Law and Public Safety and the Community Redevelopment Agency. Renovations included the conversion of the drill floor to an indoor track and soccer field. Adjoining spaces were used for offices, classrooms, and locker rooms.

== Morris Guard Armory ==
There is another earlier armory in the city from an earlier era. Formed in 1887 as a military and social club, the Morris Guards were named after Colonel Daniel Morris, a Civil War veteran and wealthy businessman who donated funds to build the armory building on New York Avenue between Atlantic and Pacific Avenues. For many years, before the construction of the Convention Center, the armory was the entertainment center of the city. Plans to convert the building was announced in November 2014.

== See also ==
- New Jersey National Guard
- National Guard Militia Museum of New Jersey
- Atlantic City Air National Guard Base
