= Joe McCarthy (baseball manager) =

American baseball manager (1887–1978)

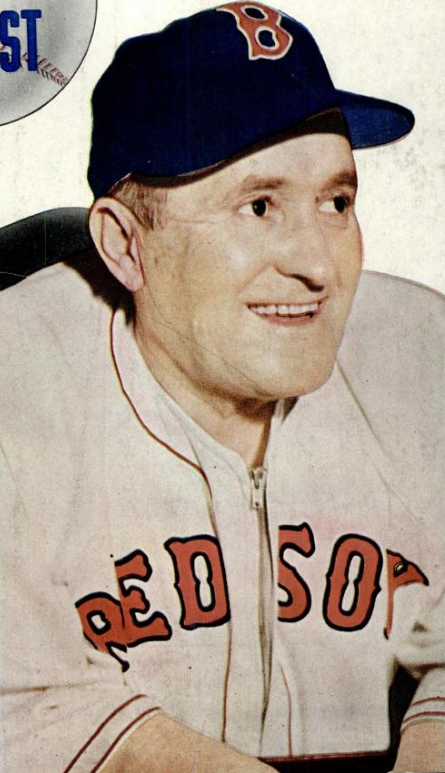
- McCarthy as Red Sox manager in 1948
- Manager
- Born: April 21, 1887; Philadelphia, Pennsylvania, U.S.
- Died: January 13, 1978 (aged 90); Buffalo, New York, U.S.
- Batted: Right Threw: Right

MLB debut
- April 13, 1926, for the Chicago Cubs

Last MLB appearance
- June 18, 1950, for the Boston Red Sox

MLB statistics
- Games managed: 3,487
- Managerial record: 2,125–1,333–29
- Winning %: .615
- Stats at Baseball Reference
- Managerial record at Baseball Reference

Teams
- Chicago Cubs (1926–1930); New York Yankees (1931–1946); Boston Red Sox (1948–1950)

Career highlights and awards
- 7× World Series champion (1932, 1936–1939, 1941, 1943); Chicago Cubs Hall of Fame; Monument Park honoree

Member of the National

Baseball Hall of Fame
- Induction: 1957
- Vote: Veterans Committee

Joseph Vincent McCarthy (April 21, 1887 – January 13, 1978) was an American manager in Major League Baseball (MLB), most renowned for his leadership of the "Bronx Bombers" teams of the New York Yankees from 1931 to 1946. The first manager to win pennants with both National and American League teams (doing so with the Chicago Cubs in 1929 and the Yankees in 1932), he won a total nine league pennants and seven World Series championships – the latter is a record tied only by Casey Stengel. McCarthy was elected to the Baseball Hall of Fame in 1957. He recorded a 100-win season six times, a record matched only by Bobby Cox and Dave Roberts. McCarthy's career winning percentages in both the regular season (.615) and postseason (.698, all in the World Series) are the highest in major league history. His 2,125 career victories rank ninth all-time in major league history for managerial wins, and he ranks first all-time for the Yankees with 1,460 wins.

== Playing years ==
McCarthy was the son of Irish-born parents. He was born in Philadelphia, Pennsylvania, and grew up in the city's Germantown neighborhood. Idolizing Athletics manager Connie Mack, McCarthy is among a handful of successful major league managers who never played in the majors. After attending Niagara University in 1905 and 1906 on a baseball scholarship, he spent the next 15 years in the minor leagues, primarily as a shortstop and second baseman with the Toledo Mud Hens, Buffalo Bisons, and Louisville Colonels. In 1916 he signed with the Brooklyn Tip-Tops of the Federal League—then considered a third major league—but the league folded before he could play a game with them.

== Team success ==
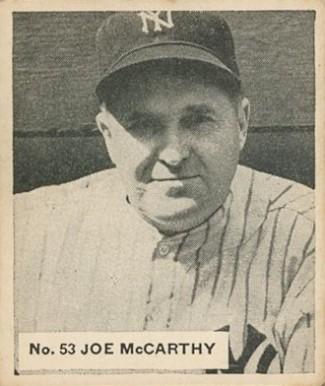
1936 Goudey baseball card of Joe McCarthy

McCarthy briefly served as player-manager in Wilkes-Barre in 1913. He resumed his managing career with Louisville in 1919, leading the team to American Association pennants in 1921 and 1925 before being hired to manage the Chicago Cubs for the 1926 season. He turned the club around, guiding them to the 1929 NL title, but was fired near the end of the 1930 season.

The Yankees hired McCarthy in 1931. The team had won just three World Series since Babe Ruth's arrival in 1920, which did not sit well with owner Jacob Ruppert. McCarthy was told that he had three years to win a championship. He did so in his second year, 1932.

With the Yankees, his strict but fair managing style helped to solidify the team's place as the dominant franchise in baseball. During his tenure, the Yankees won seven World Series. His most successful period came from 1936 to 1943. During that time, they won seven out of a possible eight pennants, all by nine games or more, and won six World Series—including four in a row from 1936 to 1939. They were the first American League team, and the third in major league history, to win four straight pennants, and the first to win more than two World Series in a row. The only time during this stretch that the Yankees' dominance was even threatened was in 1940, when they struggled all season and finished third. During his time with the Yankees, the team won 100 games or more six times. The worst finish he ever had with the team was fourth, achieved during his last full season in 1945, although the team finished 81–71.

McCarthy struggled to control his emotions at the moving testimonial held for Lou Gehrig at Yankee Stadium on July 4, 1939. After describing Gehrig as "the finest example of a ballplayer, sportsman, and citizen that baseball has ever known", McCarthy could stand it no longer. Turning tearfully to Gehrig, he said, "Lou, what else can I say except that it was a sad day in the life of everybody who knew you when you [...] told me you were quitting as a ballplayer because you felt yourself a hindrance to the team. My God, man, you were never that."

McCarthy frequently battled a drinking problem; he was known for going on "benders" that lasted a week or more. His alcoholism ended his tenure with the Yankees early in the 1946 season: By late May, the Yankees were already six games behind the Boston Red Sox. After the Yankees lost two straight to Cleveland, a drunken McCarthy chewed out pitcher Joe Page for spending too many nights out late. After failing to show up during a series with the Detroit Tigers, he returned to his farm in Amherst, New York, near Buffalo, and resigned by telegram.

After spending the 1947 season away from the game–his first season out of baseball since 1919–McCarthy returned in 1948 as manager of the Red Sox when longtime manager Joe Cronin accepted a promotion to general manager. On the first day of spring training, McCarthy arrived in an open-collared shirt. Knowing that Ted Williams almost never wore a tie, McCarthy said he was willing to set aside his longstanding rule requiring his players to wear ties when off the field, saying, "If I can't get along with a .400 hitter, they ought to fire me right now."

In the 1948 season he managed the Red Sox to a 96–59 record; however, Boston fell short of the pennant when they lost in the 1948 American League tie-breaker game to the Cleveland Indians 8–3. The following year, the Red Sox led the Yankees by one game with two to play, but the Yankees beat the Red Sox in those final two games to win the pennant, the first of ten for Casey Stengel. Boston finished 96–58, one game behind New York.

The Red Sox started the 1950 season slowly; by late June, they were 31–28, eight games out of first. On June 21, McCarthy didn't show up for a game against the Chicago White Sox, leading to speculation that he was drinking again. McCarthy insisted he would remain in the dugout; but Cronin suspected that McCarthy had lost his competitive fire, and persuaded him to resign. In 24 seasons as a major league manager, McCarthy never managed a team to a losing record.

== Coaching style ==
Despite his teams' great performance, McCarthy was not without his detractors, who believed he was simply fortunate enough to be provided with great talent and was not a strong game tactician. During his peak period from 1936 to 1943, when the Yankees won seven pennants in eight seasons, White Sox manager Jimmy Dykes described McCarthy as a "push-button" manager. Yet McCarthy was an outstanding teacher and developer of talent, and was particularly adept at handling temperamental players such as Babe Ruth, who had hoped to become New York's manager and resented a team "outsider" being hired. Ruth and McCarthy's relationship was lukewarm at best, and chilled considerably in 1934 when Ruth began openly campaigning to become manager. Partly due to this, Ruth was traded to the lowly Boston Braves after the season.

While managing, McCarthy utilized a low-key approach, never going to the mound to remove a pitcher or arguing with an umpire except on a point of the rules, preferring to stay at his seat in the center of the dugout. He also declined to wear a numbered uniform with the Yankees and Red Sox.

In order to draw attention to his presumed masterful leadership of the Yankees, McCarthy was given the nickname of "Marse Joe" by sportswriters. "Marse" is a Southern English rendition of the word "master". McCarthy's success throughout his career was such that in 32 years of managing, his 1922 Louisville club was the only team that finished either with a losing record or below fourth place.

McCarthy was named Major League Manager of the Year by The Sporting News in 1936 – the first year the award was given – and again in 1938 and 1943.

== Legacy ==
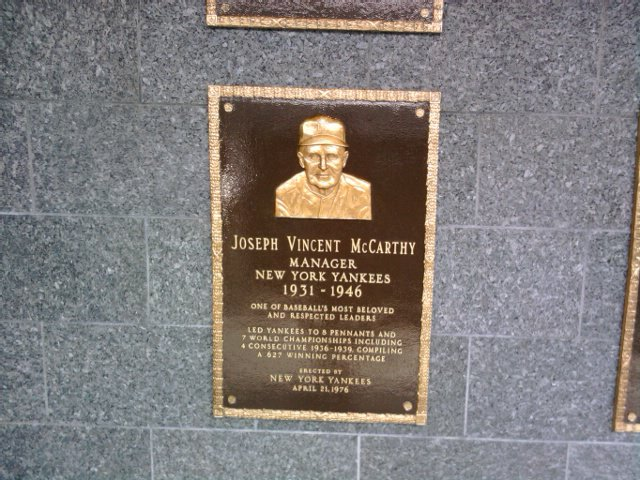
Joe McCarthy's plaque in Monument Park.

In a 1969 poll by the Baseball Writers' Association of America to commemorate the sport's professional centennial, McCarthy finished third in voting for the greatest manager in history, behind John McGraw and Casey Stengel. In a similar BBWAA poll in 1997 to select an All-Century team, he finished second behind Stengel. On April 29, 1976, the Yankees dedicated a plaque for their Monument Park to McCarthy. The plaque calls him "One of baseball's most beloved and respected leaders." In honor of his commitment to Buffalo, McCarthy became a charter member of the Buffalo Baseball Hall of Fame in 1985.

McCarthy died of pneumonia at age 90 in Buffalo, New York, and is buried in Mount Olivet Cemetery, (Roman Catholic) in Tonawanda, New York.

== Ten Commandments ==
McCarthy's "10 Commandments for Success in the Majors":

- Nobody ever became a ballplayer by walking after a ball.
- You will never become a .300 hitter unless you take the bat off your shoulder.
- An outfielder who throws in back of a runner is locking the barn after the horse is stolen.
- Keep your head up and you may not have to keep it down.
- When you start to slide, SLIDE. He who changes his mind may have to change a good leg for a bad one.
- Do not alibi on bad hops. Anyone can field the good ones.
- Always run them out. You never can tell.
- Do not quit.
- Try not to find too much fault with the umpires. You cannot expect them to be as perfect as you are.
- A pitcher who hasn't control hasn't anything.

Source: Baseball's Greatest Managers (1961).

== Managerial record ==
| Team | Year | Regular season | | | | | Postseason | | | |
| Team | Year | Games | Won | Lost | Win % | Finish | Won | Lost | Win % | Result |
|---|---|---|---|---|---|---|---|---|---|---|
| CHC | 1926 | 154 | 82 | 72 | .532 | 4th in NL | – | – | – | – |
| CHC | 1927 | 153 | 85 | 68 | .556 | 4th in NL | – | – | – | – |
| CHC | 1928 | 154 | 91 | 63 | .591 | 3rd in NL | – | – | – | – |
| CHC | 1929 | 152 | 98 | 54 | .645 | 1st in NL | 1 | 4 | .200 | Lost World Series (PHA) |
| CHC | 1930 | 150 | 86 | 64 | .573 | fired | – | – | – | – |
| CHC total | | 763 | 442 | 321 | .579 | | 1 | 4 | .200 | |
| NYY | 1931 | 153 | 94 | 59 | .614 | 2nd in AL | – | – | – | – |
| NYY | 1932 | 154 | 107 | 47 | .695 | 1st in AL | 4 | 0 | 1.000 | Won World Series (CHC) |
| NYY | 1933 | 150 | 91 | 59 | .607 | 2nd in AL | – | – | – | – |
| NYY | 1934 | 154 | 94 | 60 | .610 | 2nd in AL | – | – | – | – |
| NYY | 1935 | 149 | 89 | 60 | .597 | 2nd in AL | – | – | – | – |
| NYY | 1936 | 153 | 102 | 51 | .667 | 1st in AL | 4 | 2 | .667 | Won World Series (NYG) |
| NYY | 1937 | 154 | 102 | 52 | .662 | 1st in AL | 4 | 1 | .800 | Won World Series (NYG) |
| NYY | 1938 | 152 | 99 | 53 | .651 | 1st in AL | 4 | 0 | 1.000 | Won World Series (CHC) |
| NYY | 1939 | 151 | 106 | 45 | .702 | 1st in AL | 4 | 0 | 1.000 | Won World Series (CIN) |
| NYY | 1940 | 154 | 88 | 66 | .571 | 3rd in AL | – | – | – | – |
| NYY | 1941 | 154 | 101 | 53 | .656 | 1st in AL | 4 | 1 | .800 | Won World Series (BKN) |
| NYY | 1942 | 154 | 101 | 53 | .656 | 1st in AL | 1 | 4 | .200 | Lost World Series (STL) |
| NYY | 1943 | 154 | 98 | 56 | .636 | 1st in AL | 4 | 1 | .800 | Won World Series (STL) |
| NYY | 1944 | 154 | 83 | 71 | .539 | 3rd in AL | – | – | – | – |
| NYY | 1945 | 152 | 81 | 71 | .533 | 4th in AL | – | – | – | – |
| NYY | 1946 | 35 | 22 | 13 | .629 | resigned | – | – | – | – |
| NYY total | | 2327 | 1460 | 867 | .627 | | 29 | 9 | .763 | |
| BOS | 1948 | 155 | 96 | 59 | .619 | 2nd in AL | – | – | – | – |
| BOS | 1949 | 154 | 96 | 58 | .623 | 2nd in AL | – | – | – | – |
| BOS | 1950 | 59 | 31 | 28 | .525 | resigned | – | – | – | – |
| BOS total | | 368 | 223 | 145 | .606 | | 0 | 0 | – | |
| Total | | 3458 | 2125 | 1333 | .615 | | 30 | 13 | .698 | |

== See also ==
- List of Major League Baseball managers with most career wins
