= Tuck Stainback =

American baseball player (1911–1992)

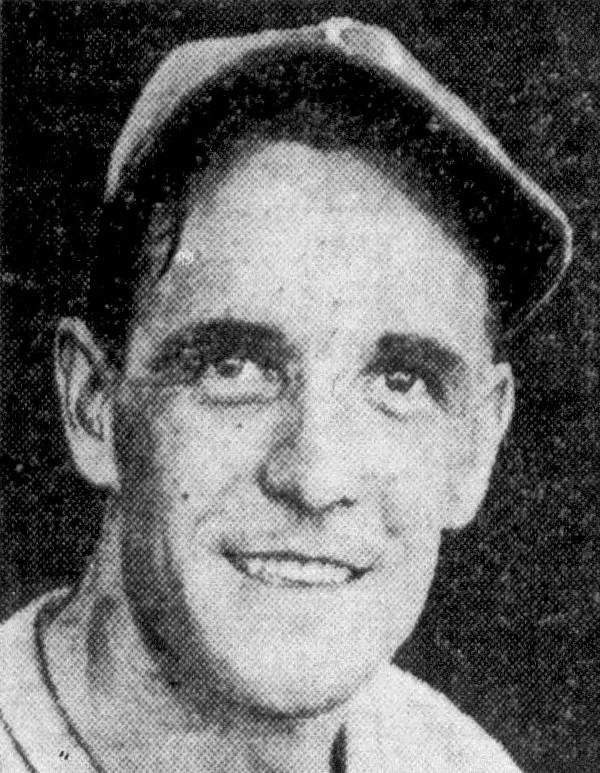
- Stainback, circa 1945
- Outfielder
- Born: August 4, 1911; Los Angeles, California, U.S.
- Died: November 29, 1992 (aged 81); Camarillo, California, U.S.
- Batted: Right Threw: Right

MLB debut
- April 17, 1934, for the Chicago Cubs

Last MLB appearance
- September 29, 1946, for the Philadelphia Athletics

MLB statistics
- Batting average: .259
- Home runs: 17
- Runs batted in: 204
- Stats at Baseball Reference

Teams
- Chicago Cubs (1934–1937); St. Louis Cardinals (1938); Philadelphia Phillies (1938); Brooklyn Dodgers (1938–1939); Detroit Tigers (1940–1941); New York Yankees (1942–1945); Philadelphia Athletics (1946)

Career highlights and awards
- World Series champion (1943)

George Tucker Stainback (August 4, 1911 – November 29, 1992) was an American professional baseball outfielder. He played in Major League Baseball (MLB) for 13 seasons with the Chicago Cubs (1934–1937), St. Louis Cardinals (1938), Philadelphia Phillies (1938), Brooklyn Dodgers (1938–1939), Detroit Tigers (1940–1941), New York Yankees (1942–1945), and Philadelphia Athletics (1946).

== Playing career ==
Born in Los Angeles, Stainback played in 817 games, 629 in the outfield. For his career, he had a .259 batting average with 17 home runs and 204 RBIs. An unusual statistic from his career was that his career errors (48) outnumbered his home runs and stolen bases combined (44).

=== Career highlights ===
- As a rookie outfielder with the Chicago Cubs in 1934, he batted .306.
- In the 1935 World Series, Stainback was on the bench for the Chicago Cubs when he began riding umpire George Moriarty, leading to the entire Cubs' dugout being cleared. Stainback was ejected. He did not make an appearance in the 1935 World Series.
- In April 1938, after four seasons with the Cubs, Stainback was traded to the St. Louis Cardinals in a deal for pitcher Dizzy Dean.
- On May 28, 1938, after being selected off waivers by the Philadelphia Phillies, Stainback single-handedly prevented Carl Hubbell from pitching a perfect game. Stainback was the only Phillies baserunner, as he had both a walk and a single off Hubbell.
- Traded to the Brooklyn Dodgers in exchange for Gibby Brack on July 11, 1938. Stainback went on to hit .327 in 104 at bats for the remainder of that season.
- Stainback played four seasons for the New York Yankees from 1942 to 1945. He played in seven World Series games for the Yankees in 1942 and 1943, although he only batted in the latter. He batted 3-for-17 in the 1943 World Series, which the Yankees won in five games.
- After retiring as a player, Stainback helped organize the first pension system for major league ballplayers in 1947 with Frankie Crosetti, requesting $250 from every player.

== Dodger executive career ==
After the Dodgers moved to Los Angeles in 1958, Stainback, who had settled in the area after retiring from baseball, approached the Dodgers' Red Patterson with his idea to develop ticket sales to fraternal and civic organizations. He developed group ticket sales over a 20-year career as a Dodger executive and supervised the club's Knothole program, which treated children to free games.

== Death ==
Stainback died on November 29, 1992 at Pleasant Valley Hospital in Camarillo, California after a stroke at age 81.

== Sources ==
- Career statistics from Baseball Reference · Baseball Reference (Minors) · Retrosheet · Baseball Almanac
- "New York Times Obituary". The New York Times.
- Los Angeles Times Obituary
