= Gene Martin (baseball executive) =

American baseball executive

John Eugene "Gene" Martin (lifespan unknown) was an American professional baseball player, manager, scout, and front-office executive who served as farm system and scouting director and player personnel adviser of the Philadelphia Phillies of Major League Baseball between 1957 and 1972.

Prior to joining the Phillies, Martin was a scouting supervisor and minor league manager in the New York Yankees organization. In 1944, he led the Binghamton Triplets to the championship of the Class A Eastern League.

Martin served in the U.S. Navy in WWI.
