= Johnny Lindell =

American baseball player (1916–1985)

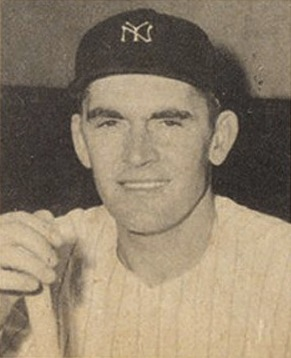
- Outfielder / Pitcher
- Born: August 30, 1916; Greeley, Colorado, U.S.
- Died: August 27, 1985 (aged 68); Newport Beach, California, U.S.
- Batted: Right Threw: Right

MLB debut
- April 18, 1941, for the New York Yankees

Last MLB appearance
- May 9, 1954, for the Philadelphia Phillies

MLB statistics
- Batting average: .273
- Home runs: 72
- Runs batted in: 404
- Win–loss record: 8–18
- Earned run average: 4.47
- Strikeouts: 146
- Stats at Baseball Reference

Teams
- New York Yankees (1941–1950); St. Louis Cardinals (1950); Pittsburgh Pirates (1953); Philadelphia Phillies (1953–1954)

Career highlights and awards
- All-Star (1943); 3× World Series champion (1943, 1947, 1949)

John Harlan Lindell (August 30, 1916 – August 27, 1985) was an American professional baseball player who was an outfielder and pitcher in Major League Baseball from 1941 to 1950 and from 1953 to 1954 for the New York Yankees, St. Louis Cardinals, Philadelphia Phillies and Pittsburgh Pirates. Lindell stood 6 feet 4 inches (1.93 m) tall and weighed 217 pounds (98 kg); he threw and batted right-handed.

== Athletic career ==
Born in Greeley, Colorado, Lindell attended Monrovia High School in Monrovia, California, where he starred in football and track as well as in baseball. At the 1935 Southern California Prep Championships, he won the 120 yard High Hurdles and placed third in the long jump. Lindell won a scholarship to attend the University of Southern California.

Lindell began his professional baseball career in 1936 at the age of 19 when he was signed by the New York Yankees organization. He progressed through the Yankees' minor league system as a pitcher. While playing for the Kansas City Blues in 1940, he led the American Association with 18 victories. Lindell made his major league debut at the age of 24 with the Yankees on April 18, 1941 before being returned to the minor leagues where, he won 23 games against 4 defeats to help the Newark Bears win the International League championship. In December 1941, he was selected as the Minor League Player of the Year.

Lindell returned to the major leagues in 1942 as a relief pitcher but, Yankees manager Joe McCarthy thought that his low strikeout totals indicated that his fast ball had lost its velocity. During spring training in 1943, McCarthy experimented with using Lindell as a first baseman and as an outfielder. He hit well enough to win the starting right fielder's position and, had a batting average above the .300 mark in early June to earn a place as a reserve player for the American League team in the 1943 All-Star Game. In the second half of the season, his hitting tapered off and he was replaced in the starting lineup by Bud Metheny. Lindell ended the season leading the league with 12 triples along with a .245 batting average in 122 games as the Yankees won the American League pennant by 13 1/2 games over the Washington Senators.

Lindell played a pivotal role in Game 3 of the 1943 World Series against the St. Louis Cardinals. With the series tied at one game apiece and the Yankees trailing by a score of 2–1, Lindell hit a single to lead off the eighth inning and, reached second base when center fielder Harry Walker mishandled the ball. When Snuffy Stirnweiss hit a bunt to first baseman Ray Sanders, Lindell attempted to advance to third base. Sanders' throw reached third baseman Whitey Kurowski in time as Lindell made a head-first slide. His head bounced up into Kurowki's head forcing the third baseman to drop the ball. The Yankees then proceeded to score five runs to win the game 6–2. The play at third base was considered a turning point in the series as the Yankees went on to win the next two games and won the world championship.

Lindell had his most productive season in 1944 when he led the league in triples, extra base hits, total bases, and had a .300 batting average with 18 home runs and 103 runs batted in. Also in 1944, Lindell tied a major league record by hitting four doubles in a game, and he recorded 468 putouts, the tenth best season total for an outfielder during the years he played. Lindell was drafted into the United States Army in June 1945 and only appeared in 44 games that season. He was discharged from the Army in March 1946.

With outfielders Joe DiMaggio, Tommy Henrich and Charlie Keller returning to the Yankees from military service after the Second World War, Lindell slipped into the role of a utility player. An injury to Keller in 1947 gave him another chance to play regularly and in the 1947 World Series, Lindell had a .500 batting average, leading the team with 7 runs batted in, as the Yankees defeated the Brooklyn Dodgers in a seven-game series. In 1948, he posted a .317 batting average with 13 home runs, 55 runs batted in and a career-high .387 on-base percentage while appearing in 88 games.

During spring training in 1949, Lindell developed a knuckleball and new Yankees manager Casey Stengel experimented with using him as a relief pitcher. On October 1, 1949, during a late-season pennant race, he hit an eighth-inning, game-winning, home run against the Boston Red Sox, putting the Yankees into a tie with their Boston arch-rivals with one game left to play. The Yankees went on to win the final game to clinch the American League pennant then defeated the Brooklyn Dodgers in the 1949 World Series.

In May 1950, Lindell's contract was purchased by the St. Louis Cardinals from the Yankees. After posting just a .186 batting average in 36 games for the Cardinals, he was sold to the Cardinals' minor league affiliate, the Columbus Red Birds who then traded him to the Hollywood Stars of the Brooklyn Dodgers organization. The Stars' manager, Fred Haney, converted Lindell into a knuckleball pitcher and, in 1952, he won 24 games against 9 losses to help the Stars win the Pacific Coast League pennant. He led the league in victories and strikeouts and, was voted the league's Most Valuable Player. His knuckleball proved to be unpredictable as he also led the league in bases on balls.

Lindell returned to the major leagues in 1953 at the age of 36 as a knuckleball pitcher, playing for the Pittsburgh Pirates, before being traded to the Philadelphia Phillies in August 1953. His knuckleball proved to be difficult to control in 1953, as he led the league in bases on balls and wild pitches. Although listed as a pitcher with the Pirates, he batted .286 and was used 34 times as a pinch-hitter, once tying a game with a 3-run ninth-inning home run. Lindell played his last major league game on May 9, 1954, at age 37. The Phillies released him in May 1954.

== Career statistics ==
In a twelve-year major league career, Lindell played in 854 games with 762 hits in 2,795 at bats for a .273 batting average along with 72 home runs, 404 runs batted in and a .344 on-base percentage. As a pitcher, he compiled an 8–18 record with a 4.47 earned run average. He led American League outfielders in 1943 with a .994 fielding percentage.

Lindell died of lung cancer in Laguna Beach, California on August 27, 1985, just three days before his 69th birthday.

== See also ==
- List of Major League Baseball annual triples leaders
