= Don Savage =

American baseball player (1919–1961)

- Third baseman
- Born: March 25, 1919; Bloomfield, New Jersey, U.S.
- Died: December 25, 1961 (aged 42); Montclair, New Jersey, U.S.
- Batted: Right Threw: Right

MLB debut
- April 18, 1944, for the New York Yankees

Last MLB appearance
- September 23, 1945, for the New York Yankees

MLB statistics
- Batting average: .256
- Home runs: 4
- Runs batted in: 27
- Stats at Baseball Reference

Teams
- New York Yankees (1944–1945)

Donald Anthony Savage (March 25, 1919 – December 25, 1961) was a Major League Baseball player. Ineligible for military service due to medical conditions, Savage played for the New York Yankees in 1944 and 1945 during World War II and was sent down to the minor leagues when regular players returned after the war. He batted and threw right-handed.

== Biography ==
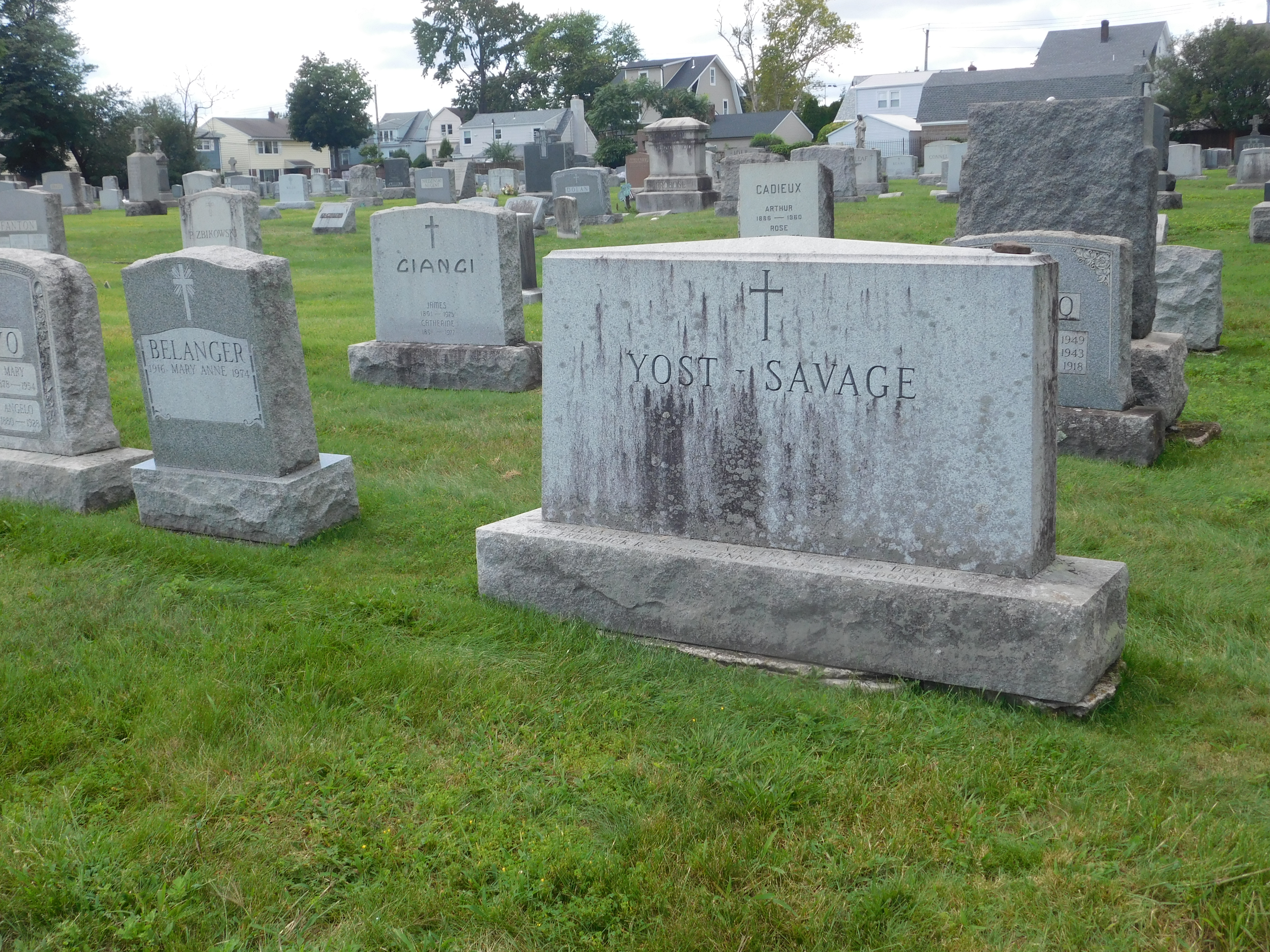
The grave of Don Savage and his family at Mount Olivet Cemetery in Bloomfield

Savage was born in Bloomfield, New Jersey, and played both baseball and football at Bloomfield High School, where he graduated in 1937. He played for a season at Rutgers University, before signing with the Yankees in June 1938 and being assigned to the Butler Yankees of the Pennsylvania State Association. After working his way up the minor league ladder, he had a successful season in 1941 with the Augusta Tigers of the South Atlantic League. Following the 1941 season, Savage became ill and doctors determined that the weight loss and other symptoms he had experienced were related to diabetes. He was unable to play baseball during the 1942 season and was granted 4-F status by his draft board due to his medical condition. He was strong enough to return to play in 1943 and had a successful season at shortstop with the Newark Bears of the International League. Based on his performance in the minors, with many full-timers called up for military duty and with Savage not subject to the draft, he was chosen to make the roster for the Yankees team for the 1944 season.

Despite growing up "no more than a bus ride away from Yankee Stadium", Savage had never been to the team's home field before he made the 1944 roster. He had a strong start to his Yankees career, batting .333 in his first 15 games with the team, but a series of injuries led to a drop in performance and his spot at third base being taken over by Oscar Grimes. Further problems with his knee led to diminished playing time in the 1945 season and the return of regular players from military duty only further reduced playing opportunities. By 1946, he was sent down to Newark and retired from baseball shortly thereafter.

He died on December 25, 1961, at the age of 42 at Mountainside Hospital (now Mountainside Medical Center) in Montclair, New Jersey and was buried in Mount Olivet Cemetery in nearby Newark. At the time of his death he was a resident of his hometown of Bloomfield and had a wife and two children.
