= Herb Karpel =

American baseball player (1917-1995)

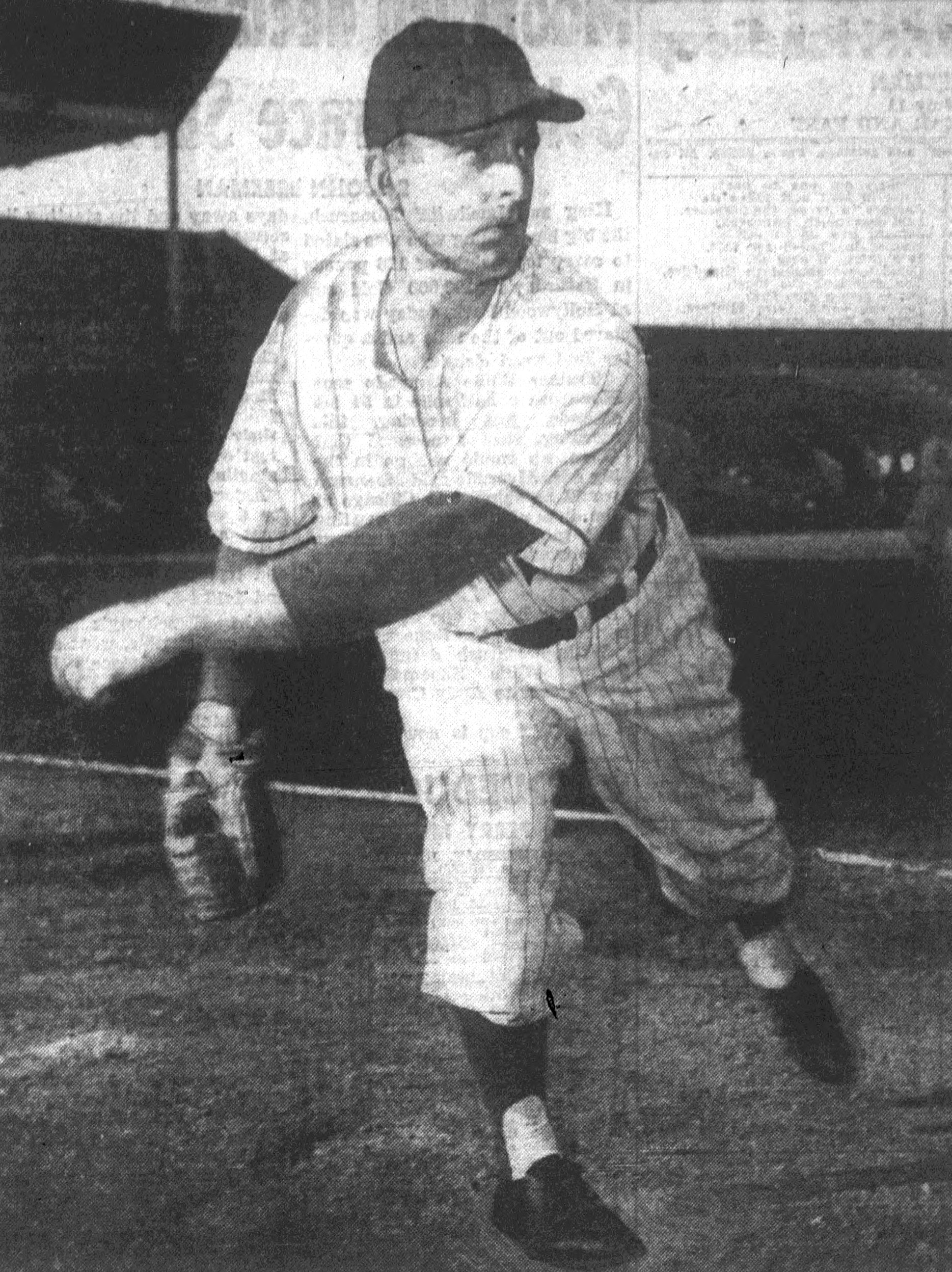
- Karpel, circa 1951
- Pitcher
- Born: December 27, 1917; Brooklyn, New York
- Died: January 24, 1995 (aged 77); San Diego, California
- Batted: Left Threw: Left

MLB debut
- April 19, 1946, for the New York Yankees

Last MLB appearance
- April 20, 1946, for the New York Yankees

MLB statistics
- Win–loss record: 0–0
- Earned run average: 10.80
- Strikeouts: 0
- Stats at Baseball Reference

Teams
- New York Yankees (1946)

Herbert (Lefty) Karpel (December 27, 1917 – January 24, 1995) was a Major League Baseball pitcher. Karpel played for the New York Yankees in 1946. In 2 career games, he had a 0–0 record, with a 10.80 ERA. He batted and threw left-handed.

Karpel was born in Brooklyn, New York, attended Richmond Hill High School in Queens, New York, died in San Diego, California, and was Jewish.

Karpel died on January 24, 1995. He was interred at Eden Memorial Park Cemetery.
