= Russ Derry =

American baseball player (1916–2004)

- Outfielder
- Born: October 7, 1916; Princeton, Missouri, U.S.
- Died: October 26, 2004 (aged 88); Kansas City, Missouri, U.S.
- Batted: Left Threw: Right

MLB debut
- July 4, 1944, for the New York Yankees

Last MLB appearance
- September 30, 1949, for the St. Louis Cardinals

MLB statistics
- Batting average: .224
- Home runs: 17
- Runs batted in: 73
- Stats at Baseball Reference

Teams
- New York Yankees (1944–1945); Philadelphia Athletics (1946); St. Louis Cardinals (1949)

Alva Russell Derry (October 7, 1916 – October 26, 2004) was an American professional baseball player from Princeton, Missouri. He appeared in 187 Major League Baseball games as an outfielder for New York Yankees in 1944 and 1945, the Philadelphia Athletics in 1946, and the St. Louis Cardinals in 1949. He batted left-handed, threw right-handed, stood 6 feet 1 inch (1.85 m) tall and weighed 180 pounds (82 kg).

Derry had 124 career hits in 553 Major League at bats. In 1949, Derry led the International League with 42 home runs, and is a member of the International League Hall of Fame.

He died on October 26, 2004, in Kansas City, Missouri.
