= Mike Milosevich =

American baseball player (1915–1966)

- Shortstop
- Born: January 13, 1915; Zeigler, Illinois, U.S.
- Died: February 3, 1966 (aged 51); East Chicago, Indiana, U.S.
- Batted: Right Threw: Right

MLB debut
- April 30, 1944, for the New York Yankees

Last MLB appearance
- September 15, 1945, for the New York Yankees

MLB statistics
- Batting average: .241
- Home runs: 0
- Runs batted in: 39
- Stats at Baseball Reference

Teams
- New York Yankees (1944–1945)

Michael Milosevich (January 13, 1915 – February 3, 1966) was an American shortstop in Major League Baseball player who played from 1944 to 1945 for the New York Yankees. Listed at 5 feet 10 inches (1.78 m), 172 pounds (78 kg), he batted and threw right-handed.
