= Snuffy Stirnweiss =

American baseball player (1918–1958)

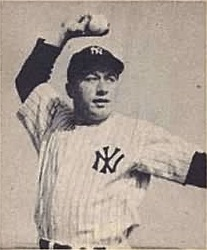
- Stirnweiss in 1948
- Second baseman
- Born: October 26, 1918; New York City, New York, U.S.
- Died: September 15, 1958 (aged 39); Newark Bay, New Jersey, U.S.
- Batted: Right Threw: Right

MLB debut
- April 22, 1943, for the New York Yankees

Last MLB appearance
- May 3, 1952, for the Cleveland Indians

MLB statistics
- Batting average: .268
- Home runs: 29
- Runs batted in: 281
- Stats at Baseball Reference

Teams
- New York Yankees (1943–1950); St. Louis Browns (1950); Cleveland Indians (1951–1952)

Career highlights and awards
- 2× All-Star (1945, 1946); 3× World Series champion (1943, 1947, 1949); AL batting champion (1945); 2× AL stolen base leader (1944, 1945)

George Henry "Snuffy" Stirnweiss (October 26, 1918 – September 15, 1958) was an American professional baseball second baseman. He played in Major League Baseball (MLB) between 1943 and 1952, spending most of his MLB career with the New York Yankees, and spending his last couple of seasons playing with the St. Louis Browns and the Cleveland Indians. A batting champion in 1945 and a two-time All-Star, he played a role with three World Series championship squads during his time in New York.

== Early life and college ==
Before turning professional, Stirnweiss was a multi-sport star in high school at Fordham Preparatory School in the Bronx. In 1935, his junior year, he led his school to championships in both baseball and basketball, and was the star of both teams in the process, while being a leader for the football team as well. These accolades helped to earn him a spot in the school's Hall of Honor upon his graduation from Fordham Prep in 1936. Furthermore, he was able to parlay his sporting accomplishments into attending the University of North Carolina, where he played significant roles with the football and baseball programs. As a football player, he was used in a quarterback and halfback hybrid role, while also being capable of booming punts farther down field than most other punters were capable of doing during this time period. His football prowess earned him many accolades, including the highest honor an athlete can achieve at North Carolina, the Patterson Medal, awarded to the senior athlete in the University who is judged by a committee of faculty, administrators, and students to be most outstanding in athletic ability, sportsmanship, morale, leadership, and general conduct.

Stirnweiss also played baseball while at North Carolina, though he was not as renowned for his baseball exploits. Stirnweiss was a high draft pick by the Chicago Cardinals of the National Football League (NFL) in the 1940 NFL draft, but after receiving an offer from the New York Yankees, he opted to pursue a baseball career and signed with the New York organization upon his graduation from North Carolina in 1940.

== Professional baseball ==
Stirnweiss spent the first three seasons of his professional baseball career in the minor leagues, playing the majority of his first season for the Norfolk Tars of the Piedmont League before being promoted and spending two full seasons in 1941 and 1942 in Double-A with the Newark Bears, a member of the International League. A second baseman, Stirnweiss posted moderate statistics in the minors, but with Joe Gordon as the incumbent second baseman at the top flight in the organization, Stirnweiss was not due for a promotion to New York. For his part, Gordon was named the Most Valuable Player of the American League in 1942 after posting a .322 batting average and 103 runs batted in.

However, the United States joined World War II after the 1941 MLB season, and in the next couple of years, many prominent MLB superstars joined the military; among others, Joe Gordon and Joe DiMaggio served for years in the military as well as Charlie Keller spending 1944 on military duty. For Stirnweiss, the war was the break he needed to get his foot in the door in the Major Leagues. When Stirnweiss was 24, the Yankees promoted him to the majors for the 1943 season. He posted meager numbers for a utility player dividing his time between shortstop and second base. In 83 games, he hit .219 while providing uneven results as a base stealer and only thirteen extra base hits in over 300 plate appearances. He hit his first career home run, and his only home run of 1943, in a late-August double header at Briggs Stadium in Detroit in a 5–1 New York win. The 1943 Yankees won the American League pennant with 98 wins; Stirnweiss played little in the World Series that year. Stirnweiss only managed to earn one plate appearance, serving as a pinch-hitter for the pitcher Hank Borowy late in Game 3 with the Yankees trailing, but on a subsequent sacrifice bunt, the third baseman committed an error, paving the way for a five-run rally in a game New York won, 6–2. The Yankees, having lost in the previous year's World Series to the St. Louis Cardinals in upset fashion, returned the favor in 1943 and won the championship in five games.

=== Peak years: 1944–1945 ===
In 1944, Gordon joined the military and temporarily vacated his ironclad second base position. As a regular in 1944, Stirnweiss served as the Yankees' leadoff hitter and had a breakout season, leading the league with 205 hits, 125 runs, 16 triples and 55 stolen bases. He also recorded 59 extra base hits in total while hitting .319. Providing sturdy and almost error-less defense from second base as well, Stirnweiss was arguably the most vital player on a Yankees team which won 83 games and finished in third place in the American League in 1944. His contributions were so outstanding he was awarded with a fourth-place finish in the AL MVP voting at the close of the 1944 season.

Stirnweiss posted a triple slash line in 1945 that was almost identical to the one he posted the year prior, while socking 64 extra base hits in another league-leading season in plate appearances. Despite a ten-point drop in his batting average from the previous season, his .309 clip in 1945 was enough to edge Tony Cuccinello for the batting crown in the American League for 1945. His base stealing was a bit more uneven in 1945, only posting a 66% success rate that was a far cry from his 83% figure the previous year. With another batting average in excess of .300 and on-base percentage in excess of .380, he received another top-4 finish in the American League's MVP balloting, this time finishing in third behind only Detroit ace Hal Newhouser and Detroit second baseman Eddie Mayo.

What had been most impressive about Stirnweiss over the 1944 and 1945 seasons had been the consistency he had exhibited at the plate. Although he experienced a platoon split showing he fared better against left-handed pitching, he was able to hold his own against same-sided pitching as well. He hit .336 and .340 against left-handed pitching during these two seasons, and .315 and .299 against right-handed pitching. He rarely hit into double plays, using his excellent speed to be able to beat out many ground balls that were kept in the infield, as well as using his speed to leg out many triples as well, leading the league in triples in both seasons, posting 38 in total. He also exhibited a disciplined eye at the plate as well; he drew 151 walks as a regular over the course of these two seasons and posted a comparatively moderate total of 149 strikeouts during this same time period. With Joe Gordon's return to New York for 1946, the most important question was whether Stirnweiss was legitimately burgeoning into a superstar at the major league level, or whether his peak years had coincided with a war-torn league.

=== Decline: 1946–1952 ===
Stirnweiss spent the 1946 campaign as a utility player and then ultimately returned to everyday duty at second base in the seasons that followed. Over these three seasons, his last three as an everyday player, Stirnweiss never came close to posting a .300 average; he was held to the .250's in all three seasons. His results, on the whole relative to his position, were not horrible, but they were not up to the lofty numbers of 1944 and 1945, and they were not up to the standard that Joe Gordon prior to that had established during what was ultimately a Hall of Fame career.

Unable to re-capture his former glory, Stirnweiss spent 1949 as a partially used utility player, often coming in as a pinch hitter or defensive replacement late in games with the occasional start, and appeared in seven games for New York before being shipped off to the St. Louis Browns. He posted a pair of .216 batting averages in his final two full seasons in the Major Leagues, doing so again in 1951 after joining the Cleveland Indians. He appeared in one game in 1952 as a defensive replacement at third base and subsequently retired. He was a 1946 All-Star for the American League, perhaps as a reward for his prior two seasons rather than his production in 1946 on its own merits. He participated in all three World Series that the Yankees played in during his time with the club, and for his part, he delivered in the 1947 World Series against the cross-town Brooklyn Dodgers, a knock-out seven game fight with the Yankees emerging victorious. Stirnweiss had seven hits and eight walks in that series, posting a .429 on-base percentage in helping New York to the crown. He was used as a defensive replacement in the one game he featured in for the Yankees in their 1949 World Series participation, a shorter victory once again over Brooklyn.

== Post-playing career and death ==
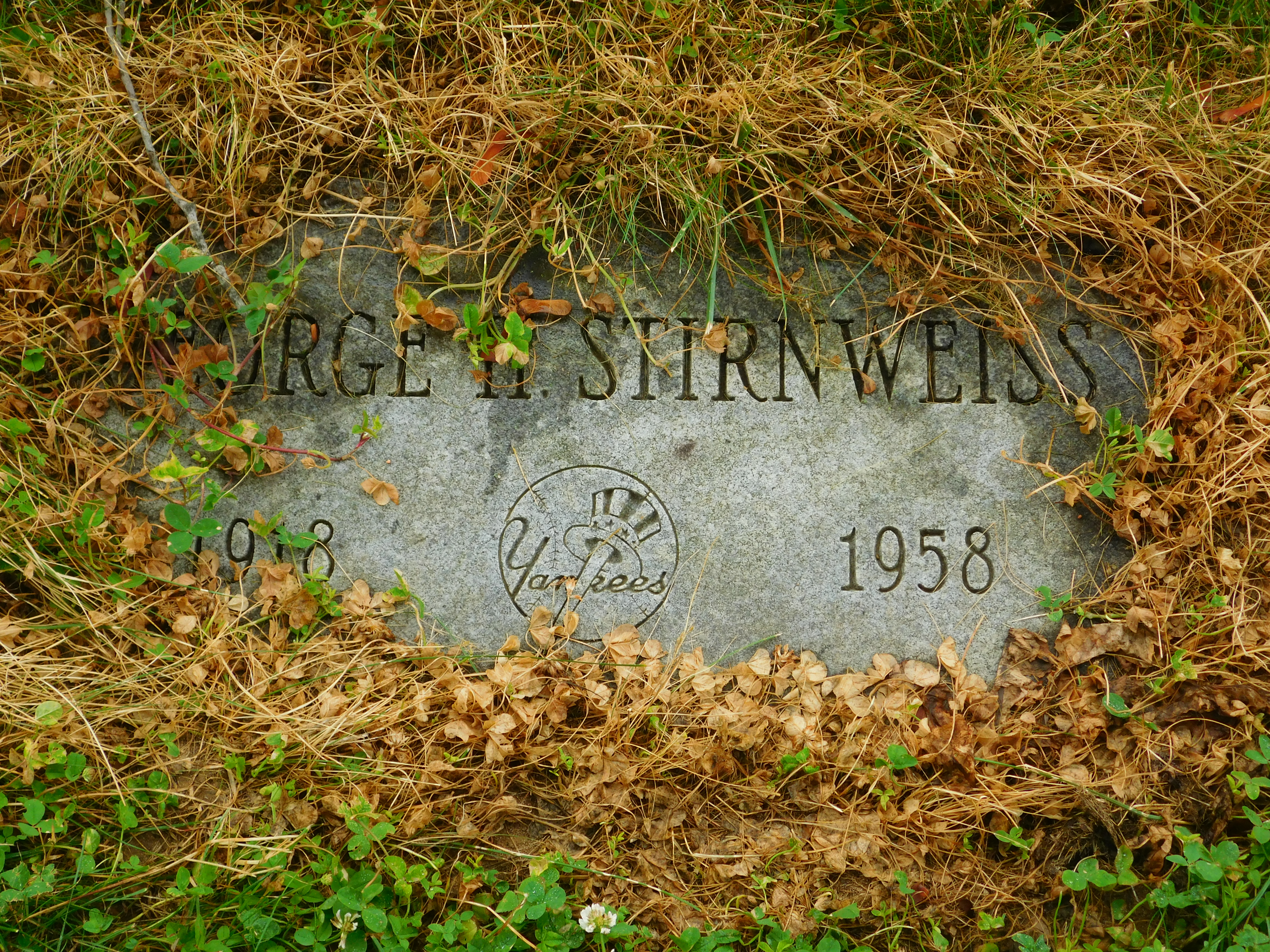
Stirnweiss' grave at Mount Olivet Cemetery in Middletown, New Jersey

Upon his retirement from Major League Baseball in 1952, Stirnweiss ventured into the field of managing in the minor league ranks. He served as the manager for the Schenectady Blue Jays, the Philadelphia Phillies' Eastern League affiliate, in 1954, and then moved back into the Yankees’ organization and served as the manager for their affiliate in the same league, the Binghamton Triplets, in 1955. However, this was not his long-term goal, and he left baseball after the 1955 season in favor of a career in finance.

Moving into the banking industry, he worked as a solicitor for Federation Bank and Trust Company, but only for a short while. A father with six children, Stirnweiss fell ill and suffered a heart attack in June 1957, and he needed some time to recuperate from his health problems. He never returned to Federation Bank after he suffered his heart attack.

Not long after his recovery, he returned to work with Caldwell & Company in Manhattan. On September 15, 1958, Stirnweiss was on Train #3314 of the Central Railroad of New Jersey heading into Manhattan when, for reasons that have never been determined, the train drove straight through signals and flew off the open Newark Bay lift bridge and into the bay itself. Stirnweiss was on board one of the passenger cars that fell into Newark Bay, killing him and 47 other passengers. Stirnweiss was 39.

== See also ==
- List of Major League Baseball batting champions
- List of Major League Baseball annual runs scored leaders
- List of Major League Baseball annual stolen base leaders
- List of Major League Baseball annual triples leaders
