= Rip Collins (catcher) =

American baseball player (1909–1969)

- Catcher
- Born: September 18, 1909; Pittsburgh, Pennsylvania
- Died: April 19, 1969 (aged 59); Pittsburgh, Pennsylvania
- Batted: Right Threw: Right

MLB debut
- April 28, 1940, for the Chicago Cubs

Last MLB appearance
- September 30, 1944, for the New York Yankees
- Stats at Baseball Reference

Teams
- Chicago Cubs (1940); New York Yankees (1944)

Robert Joseph "Rip" Collins (September 18, 1909 – April 19, 1969) was an American backup catcher in Major League Baseball who played for the Chicago Cubs (1940) and New York Yankees (1944). Collins batted and threw right-handed. He was born in Pittsburgh, Pennsylvania.

In a two-season career, Collins was a .211 hitter with one home run and 14 RBI in 50 games played.

Collins died in his hometown of Pittsburgh at the age of 59.
