= Mel Queen (pitcher) =

American baseball player (1918–1982)

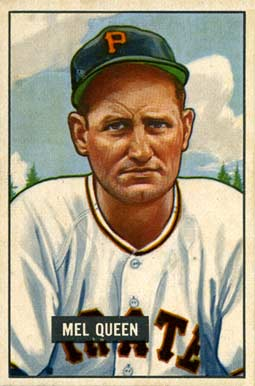
- Pitcher
- Born: March 4, 1918; Maxwell, Pennsylvania, U.S.
- Died: April 4, 1982 (aged 64); Fort Smith, Arkansas, U.S.
- Batted: Right Threw: Right

MLB debut
- April 18, 1942, for the New York Yankees

Last MLB appearance
- May 1, 1952, for the Pittsburgh Pirates

MLB statistics
- Win–loss record: 27–40
- Earned run average: 5.09
- Strikeouts: 328
- Stats at Baseball Reference

Teams
- New York Yankees (1942, 1944, 1946–1947); Pittsburgh Pirates (1947–1948, 1950–1952)

Melvin Joseph Queen (March 4, 1918 – April 4, 1982) was an American pitcher in Major League Baseball. From 1942 through 1952, he played for the New York Yankees and Pittsburgh Pirates. Born in Maxwell, Pennsylvania, he batted and threw right-handed.

In an eight-season career, Queen posted a 27–40 record with 328 strikeouts and a 5.09 ERA in 556 2/3 innings pitched. His best season was in 1951 when he led the National League pitchers with a 6.58 SO/9 (123 SO in 168 1/3 IP).

On August 27, 1951, Queen became a notable footnote in baseball history when he was thrown out by two feet at first base by strong-armed Brooklyn Dodger outfielder Carl Furillo after Queen had apparently singled into right field.

His son, Melvin Douglas Queen, was an MLB outfielder-turned-pitcher who played with the Reds and Angels and also coached and managed for the Toronto Blue Jays.

Queen died in Fort Smith, Arkansas, at the age of 64.

== See also ==
- List of second-generation Major League Baseball players
