= Bill Drescher =

American baseball player (1921-1968)

- Catcher/Pinch hitter
- Born: May 23, 1921; Congers, New York, U.S.
- Died: May 15, 1968 (aged 46); Haverstraw, New York, U.S.
- Batted: Left Threw: Right

MLB debut
- April 19, 1944, for the New York Yankees

Last MLB appearance
- May 28, 1946, for the New York Yankees

MLB statistics
- Batting average: .266
- Home runs: 0
- Runs batted in: 16
- Stats at Baseball Reference

Teams
- New York Yankees (1944–1946)

William Clayton Drescher (May 23, 1921 – May 15, 1968) was an American professional baseball catcher who appeared in 57 games in Major League Baseball for the New York Yankees between in 1944 and 1946. Born in Congers, New York, he batted left-handed, threw right-handed, and was listed as 6 feet 2 inches (1.88 m) tall and 190 pounds (86 kg).

Nicknamed "Dutch", Drescher had a 12-year professional career that began in 1942 and ended in 1954; he did not play during the 1951 season. Most of his MLB action occurred during 1945, the last wartime season, when Drescher caught 2661/3 innings, second only to Mike Garbark among backstops on the Yankee roster. In 1946, with war veterans returning to baseball, Drescher got into only six May games and caught 12 innings before returning to the minor leagues. He played at Triple-A for the rest of his pro career.

With the Yankees, Drescher had 37 career hits, including four doubles, one triple and 16 RBIs, batting .266 in 57 games. He died at age 46 on May 15, 1968, in Haverstraw, New York.
