= Al Lyons =

American baseball player (1918–1965)

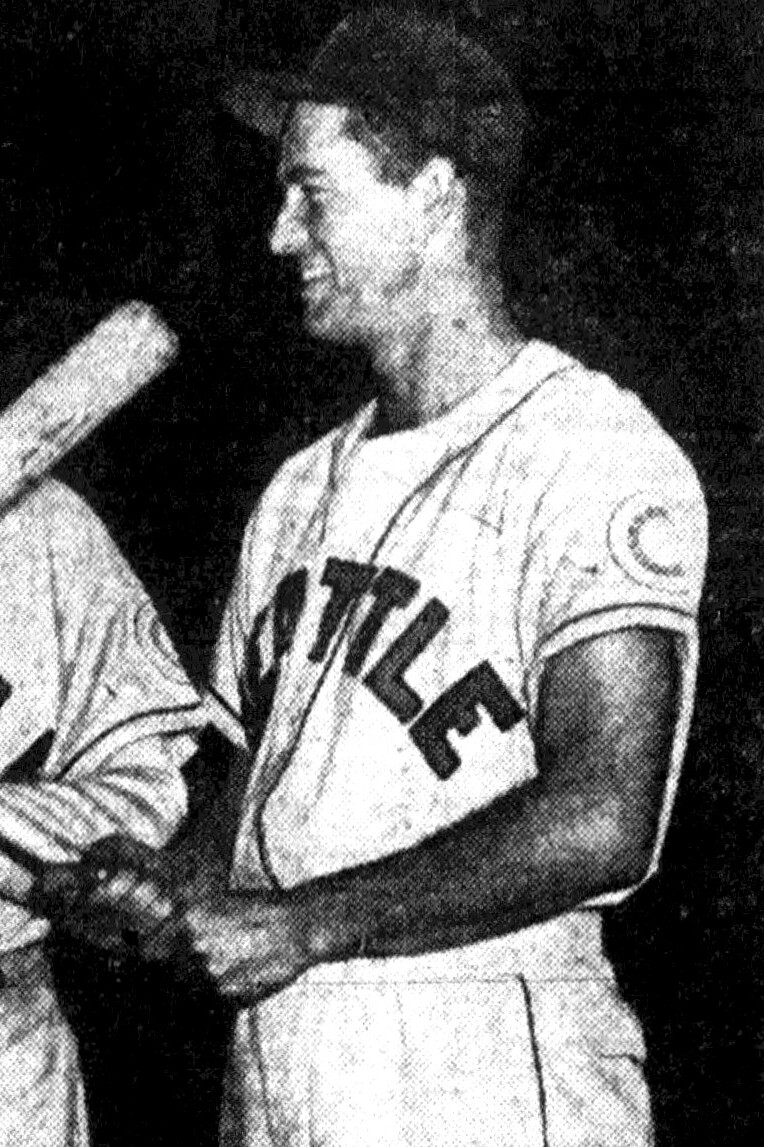
- Lyons, circa 1951
- Pitcher
- Born: July 18, 1918; St. Joseph, Missouri
- Died: December 20, 1965 (aged 47); Inglewood, California
- Batted: Right Threw: Right

MLB debut
- April 19, 1944, for the New York Yankees

Last MLB appearance
- October 3, 1948, for the Boston Braves

MLB statistics
- Win–loss record: 3–3
- Earned run average: 6.30
- Strikeouts: 46
- Stats at Baseball Reference

Teams
- New York Yankees (1944, 1946–1947); Pittsburgh Pirates (1947); Boston Braves (1948)

Albert Harold Lyons (July 18, 1918 – December 20, 1965) was an American professional baseball player. He appeared in 39 Major League Baseball games as a pitcher in 1944 and from 1946 to 1948 with the New York Yankees, Pittsburgh Pirates and the Boston Braves. He also appeared in five games as an outfielder and 16 more as a pinch hitter, compiling a .293 MLB career batting average (17 hits in 58 at bats), with one home run, three doubles, and nine runs batted in.

As a hurler in the Majors, Lyons worked in an even 100 innings pitched, allowing 125 hits and 59 bases on balls. He made one start and worked in 38 games in relief.

Born in St. Joseph, Missouri, and raised in Los Angeles, Lyons batted and threw right-handed, standing 6 feet 2 inches (1.88 m) tall and weighing 195 pounds (88 kg). His pro career lasted for 16 seasons (1940–1944; 1946–1956), including a long stint in the top-level Pacific Coast League. However, in the minor leagues, Lyons was predominantly an outfielder, appearing in over 1,000 games in that role, compared to 134 as a pitcher.

After retiring from the field, Lyons became a scout, serving the New York Mets during their early years as an expansion team and signing Dick Selma, among others. He died at 47 in Inglewood, California, from a heart attack.
