= Hersh Martin =

American baseball player (1909–1980)

- Outfielder
- Born: September 19, 1909; Birmingham, Alabama, U.S.
- Died: November 17, 1980 (aged 71); Cuba, Missouri, U.S.
- Batted: Switch Threw: Right

MLB debut
- April 23, 1937, for the Philadelphia Phillies

Last MLB appearance
- September 23, 1945, for the New York Yankees

MLB statistics
- Batting average: .285
- Home runs: 28
- Runs batted in: 215
- Stats at Baseball Reference

Teams
- Philadelphia Phillies (1937–1940); New York Yankees (1944–1945)

Career highlights and awards
- All-Star (1938)

Hershel Ray Martin (September 19, 1909 – November 17, 1980) was an American professional baseball player and scout. An outfielder born in Birmingham, Alabama, and raised in Ponca City, Oklahoma, Martin played for 23 seasons, mostly in minor league baseball, although he did appear in 607 Major League games in 1937–1940 and 1944–1945 for the Philadelphia Phillies and New York Yankees.

Martin stood 6 feet 2 inches (1.88 m) tall and weighed 190 pounds (86 kg); he was a switch-hitter who threw right-handed. He had 643 hits during his Major League career, batting .285, including 28 home runs, 135 doubles and 29 triples. His 3 1/2 seasons with the Phillies occurred during one of the worst stretches in the team's history; from 1937 through 1940, the Phils compiled a record of 201–406 (.331). At age 34 he was acquired by the Yankees from the minor-league version of the Milwaukee Brewers and appeared in 202 games for the Bombers during the World War II manpower shortage.

In 1948, as the playing manager of the Class C Albuquerque Dukes of the West Texas–New Mexico League, Martin batted .425 with 61 doubles and 128 runs batted in. The following seasons, he hit .376 and .389. Overall as a minor leaguer he batted .317 with 2,298 hits.

After retiring from the field, Martin scouted for the Phillies (1955–1956), Chicago Cubs (1958) and New York Mets (1961–1979).

Hershel Martin was former MLB commissioner Bud Selig's favorite player as a youngster.
