= Bill Zuber =

American baseball player (1913–1982)

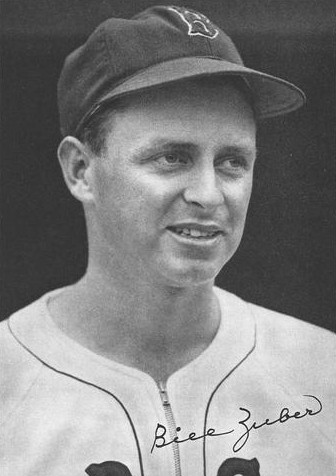
- Zuber in 1947
- Pitcher
- Born: March 26, 1913; Middle Amana, Iowa, U.S.
- Died: November 2, 1982 (aged 69); Cedar Rapids, Iowa, U.S.
- Batted: Right Threw: Right

MLB debut
- September 16, 1936, for the Cleveland Indians

Last MLB appearance
- September 23, 1947, for the Boston Red Sox

MLB statistics
- Win–loss record: 43–42
- Earned run average: 4.28
- Strikeouts: 383
- Stats at Baseball Reference

Teams
- Cleveland Indians (1936–1940); Washington Senators (1941–1942); New York Yankees (1943–1946); Boston Red Sox (1946–1947)

Career highlights and awards
- World Series champion (1943)

William Henry Zuber (March 26, 1913 – November 2, 1982) was an American professional baseball pitcher. He had an 11-year Major League Baseball career between 1936 and 1947. He pitched his entire career in the American League with the Cleveland Indians, Washington Senators, New York Yankees and Boston Red Sox. Bill was born and raised in Middle Amana, Iowa, a community of German pietists who until 1932 practiced a form of communitarian living.

== Playing career ==
=== Indians ===
Zuber made his professional debut in 1932, and joined the Zanesville Greys of the Middle Atlantic League, a minor league team in the Indians' organization, in 1933. After several more seasons in the minor leagues, Zuber spent most of the 1936 season playing for the Greys, finishing with a 17–8 record and over 200 strikeouts. He made his Major League debut on September 16, 1936, with the Cleveland Indians. In his first game against the Boston Red Sox, he pitched five innings and earned a win in the six-inning affair which was shortened due to rain. After starting a second game and finishing the season with one win and one loss, he spent the 1937 season playing for the Milwaukee Brewers of the American Association. He rejoined the Indians during the 1938 and 1939 seasons and was used as a relief pitcher. In the two seasons, he posted a 2–3 record and finished 16 games. He finished the 1940 season with a 1–1 record, and on April 21, 1941, the Washington Senators purchased his contract from the Indians.

=== Senators and Yankees ===
Zuber spent two seasons with the Senators, starting seven games and finishing 19 both seasons. He was classified 4-F by the military, and as a result was able to remain with the team during World War II. In 1942, he won a career high nine games. On January 29, 1943, Zuber was traded to the Yankees with cash for Jerry Priddy and Milo Candini. The 1943 New York Yankees went on to win the world series, with Zuber finishing the season with an 8–4 record over 20 games, which included 13 starts and 7 complete games. He did not pitch in the 1943 World Series. He remained an occasional starter the following two seasons, winning five games in both seasons and earning a 3.19 earned run average in 1945. Although he only posted a 5–11 record for the season, the Yankees were shutout 14 times during the season, seven when Zuber was pitching, a club record.

=== Boston Red Sox ===
At the start of the 1946 season, Zuber pitched three games and had an ERA of over 12 before he was purchased by the Boston Red Sox on June 18. He went on to post a 5–1 record and a career-low 2.54 ERA during the remainder of the season. On September 21, Zuber won a game against the Senators, which gave the Red Sox their 100th victory of the season. Zuber appeared in game four of the 1946 World Series, pitching two innings and allowing one run in a 12–3 loss to the St. Louis Cardinals. After pitching 20 games during the 1947 season, Zuber returned to the minor leagues for a season, pitching for the Louisville Colonels in 1948, before retiring.

== Life after baseball ==
After retirement, Zuber started a restaurant in Homestead, Iowa of the Amana Colonies in 1949. Zuber died in Cedar Rapids, Iowa on November 2, 1982.
