= Mike Garbark =

American baseball player (1916-1994)

- Catcher
- Born: February 3, 1916; Houston, Texas, U.S.
- Died: August 31, 1994 (aged 78); Charlotte, North Carolina, U.S.
- Batted: Right Threw: Right

MLB debut
- April 18, 1944, for the New York Yankees

Last MLB appearance
- September 1, 1945, for the New York Yankees

MLB statistics
- Batting average: .244
- Home runs: 2
- Runs batted in: 59
- Stats at Baseball Reference

Teams
- New York Yankees (1944–1945)

Nathaniel Michael Garbark (February 3, 1916 – August 31, 1994) was an American Major League Baseball player. Garbark played for the New York Yankees in 1944 and 1945. He batted and threw right-handed.

He was born in Houston, Texas and died in Charlotte, North Carolina.

Garbark's brother, Bob Garbark, also played in the Majors.
