= Steve Roser =

American baseball player

- Pitcher
- Born: January 25, 1918; Rome, New York
- Died: February 8, 2002 (aged 84); Utica, New York
- Batted: Right Threw: Right

MLB debut
- May 5, 1944, for the New York Yankees

Last MLB appearance
- June 29, 1946, for the Boston Braves

MLB statistics
- Win–loss record: 6–5
- Strikeouts: 64
- Earned run average: 4.04
- Stats at Baseball Reference

Teams
- New York Yankees (1944–1946); Boston Braves (1946)

Emerson Corey "Steve" Roser (January 25, 1918 – February 8, 2002) was a Major League Baseball player. He played parts of three seasons in the majors, debuting with the New York Yankees in 1944, and finishing with the Boston Braves in 1946.

Roser graduated from Rome Free Academy in 1936 and then attended Clarkson University where he played college baseball. Upon graduating from Clarkson in 1940, he signed with the Yankees. After his playing career, he lived in Utica, New York and Clayville, New York and working in the sporting goods and restaurant business.
