= Nick Etten =

American baseball player (1913-1990)

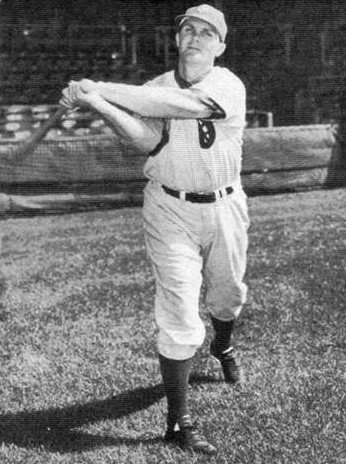
- Etten in 1948
- First baseman
- Born: September 19, 1913; Spring Grove, Illinois, U.S.
- Died: October 18, 1990 (aged 77); Hinsdale, Illinois, U.S.
- Batted: Left Threw: Left

MLB debut
- September 8, 1938, for the Philadelphia Athletics

Last MLB appearance
- May 9, 1947, for the Philadelphia Phillies

MLB statistics
- Batting average: .277
- Home runs: 89
- Runs batted in: 526
- Stats at Baseball Reference

Teams
- Philadelphia Athletics (1938–1939); Philadelphia Phillies (1941–1942); New York Yankees (1943–1946); Philadelphia Phillies (1947)

Career highlights and awards
- All-Star (1945); World Series champion (1943); AL home run leader (1944); AL RBI leader (1945)

Nicholas Raymond Thomas Etten (September 19, 1913 – October 18, 1990) was an American first baseman in major league baseball, who played for the Philadelphia Athletics (1938–39), Philadelphia Phillies (1941–42, 1947) and New York Yankees (1943–46). Etten batted and threw left-handed. He was born in Spring Grove, Illinois. Etten attended St. Rita of Cascia High School on the south side of Chicago.

Etten attended Villanova University and was drafted by the Athletics from the Oakland Oaks minor league team. He made his major league debut with the Athletics late in 1938, also playing part-time for them in 1939. After playing two seasons with the Phillies, he was traded to the Yankees in January 1943, and he responded by leading the American League with 22 home runs, and drawing 97 walks in 1944, and with 111 RBIs the following season, also best in the league. During his four-year stint with the Yankees, Etten also ranked among league leaders in most offensive categories, was a member of the 1943 World Champion team, and was selected to the All-Star Game in 1945. In 1947, he appeared in fourteen games for the Phillies before retiring.

In a nine-season career, Etten was a .277 hitter with 89 home runs and 526 RBIs. Playing every inning of his career as a first baseman, he recorded a .988 fielding percentage.

In retirement he served president of a construction company in Chicago. Etten died on October 18, 1990 at his home in Hinsdale, Illinois at the age of 77.

== See also ==
- List of Major League Baseball annual runs batted in leaders
- List of Major League Baseball annual home run leaders
