= Garland Braxton =

American baseball player (1900–1966)

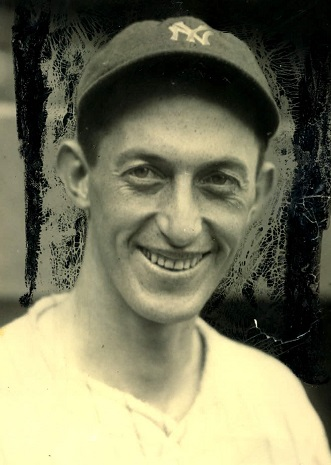
- Braxton in 1926
- Pitcher
- Born: June 10, 1900; Snow Camp, North Carolina, U.S.
- Died: February 25, 1966 (aged 65); Norfolk, Virginia, U.S.
- Batted: Both Threw: Left

MLB debut
- May 27, 1921, for the Boston Braves

Last MLB appearance
- September 23, 1933, for the St. Louis Browns

MLB statistics
- Win–loss record: 50–53
- Earned run average: 4.13
- Strikeouts: 412
- Stats at Baseball Reference

Teams
- Boston Braves (1921–1922); New York Yankees (1925–1926); Washington Senators (1927–1930); Chicago White Sox (1930–1931); St. Louis Browns (1931, 1933)

Career highlights and awards
- AL ERA leader (1928)

Edgar Garland Braxton (June 10, 1900 – February 25, 1966) was an American professional baseball player. He was a pitcher over parts of 10 seasons (1921–1933) with the Boston Braves, New York Yankees, Washington Senators, Chicago White Sox and St. Louis Browns. He led the American League in ERA in 1928 while playing for Washington. For his career, he compiled a 50–53 record in 282 appearances, with a 4.13 ERA and 412 strikeouts.

== See also ==
- List of Major League Baseball annual saves leaders
