= Frankie Crosetti =

American baseball player (1910-2002)

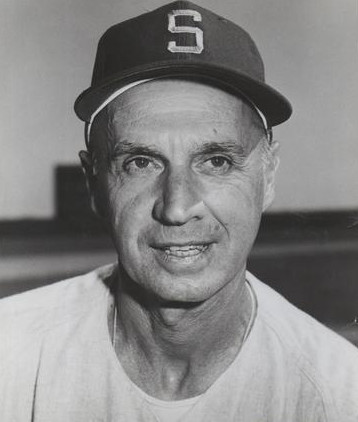
- Crosetti in 1969
- Shortstop
- Born: October 4, 1910; San Francisco, California, U.S.
- Died: February 11, 2002 (aged 91); Stockton, California, U.S.
- Batted: Right Threw: Right

MLB debut
- April 12, 1932, for the New York Yankees

Last MLB appearance
- October 3, 1948, for the New York Yankees

MLB statistics
- Batting average: .245
- Home runs: 98
- Runs batted in: 649
- Stats at Baseball Reference

Teams
- As player: New York Yankees (1932–1948); As coach: New York Yankees (1947–1968); Seattle Pilots (1969); Minnesota Twins (1970–1971)

Career highlights and awards
- 2× All-Star (1936, 1939); 17× World Series champion (1932, 1936–1939, 1941, 1943, 1947, 1949–1953, 1956, 1958, 1961, 1962); AL stolen base leader (1938)

Frank Peter Joseph Crosetti (October 4, 1910 – February 11, 2002), nicknamed "The Crow", was an American baseball player. From 1932 to 1948, he spent his entire seventeen-year Major League Baseball playing career with the New York Yankees at shortstop. After his retirement as a player, he became third base coach with the franchise for an additional twenty seasons. From 1932 to 1968, Crosetti won a combined total of 17 World Series Championships, 8 as a player, and 9 as a coach, the most by any individual. Crosetti is tied with NHL legend Jean Béliveau for the most combined championships in sports.

== Early years ==
Crosetti was born in San Francisco, California, and grew up in North Beach, which was something of a hotbed of Italian-American talent on the baseball field during the 1920s and 1930s (Tony Lazzeri, Charlie Silvera and the three DiMaggio brothers also hail from the same neighborhood). Before joining the Yankees, Crosetti played four seasons with the San Francisco Seals of the Pacific Coast League.

== New York Yankees ==
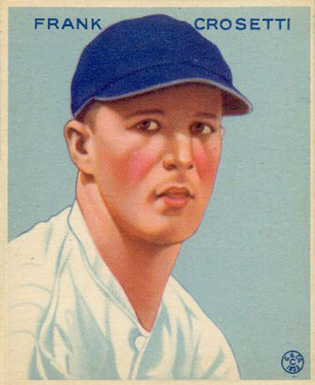
A 1933 Goudey baseball card of Crosetti

Crosetti joined the Yankees in 1932, and batted .241 with five home runs and 57 runs batted in (RBI) in 116 games while batting at the bottom of the Yankees' batting order. He was part of a World Series championship his first year in the big leagues as the Yankees completed a four-game sweep of the Chicago Cubs in the 1932 World Series two days shy of Crosetti's 22nd birthday.

The finest year of Crosetti's career came in 1936, when he played in 151 games and batted .288 with 15 home runs, 78 RBI, and 137 runs scored, all career highs. Batting lead-off, he was named an American League All-Star for the first time in his career, and reached the World Series for the second time. Crosetti batted .269 in the Yankees' six-game victory over the New York Giants in the 1936 World Series, and drove in the winning run in the Yankees' 2–1 victory in Game 3. The 1936 season was the first of a string of four World Series titles for Crosetti and the Yankees.

After a poor 1940 season, he lost his starting shortstop job to Phil Rizzuto in 1941. He was given back the starting shortstop job when Rizzuto joined the Navy for battle in World War II; however, he became a reserve once again when Rizzuto rejoined the club in 1946. Crosetti then became a player/coach for the club through the 1948 season.

== Career stats ==
Games	PA	AB	Runs	Hits	2B	3B	HR	RBI	SB	BB	SO	Avg.	Slg.	OBP	HBP	Fld%
1,683	7,273	6,277	1,006	1,541	260	65	98	649	113	792	799	.245	.354	.341	114	.949

In 29 World Series games, Crosetti batted .174 with one home run, 11 RBI, and 16 runs scored. His only World Series home run was a two-run shot off Dizzy Dean in Game 2 of the 1938 World Series that gave the Yankees a 4–3 lead over the Cubs. Perhaps Crosetti's second most memorable moment in postseason play occurred in Game 3 of the 1942 World Series when he shoved umpire Bill Summers, an act for which he received a $250 fine from Commissioner Kenesaw Mountain Landis and was suspended the first 30 games of the 1943 season.

Crosetti led the American League in plate appearances twice (1938 and 1939), stolen bases once (1938), strikeouts twice (1937 and 1938) and in being hit by pitches eight times (1934, 1936–40, 1942 and 1945). He was known as the weak link in the Yankees batting order, but he was also known as a slick fielder and for his ability to pull off the hidden ball trick. Crosetti earned eight World Series rings as a player, and was a two-time All-Star (1936 and 1939).

In 1953, in a poll of 48 baseball experts to select the All-Time Yankees Team to mark the 50th anniversary of the club, Crosetti was named the all-time Utility Infielder.

== Coaching career ==
Crosetti became third base coach with the Yankees in 1947 and was part of an additional nine World Series championships as a coach with the franchise after he retired as a player following the 1948 season. He was said to be the "perfect coach", because he had no ambition whatsoever to manage, turning down numerous offers over the years to do so. After 37 years, longing to be closer to his family in Northern California, he left the franchise to join the expansion Seattle Pilots in 1969. He moved to the Minnesota Twins from 1970 to 1971, after the Pilots (who became the Milwaukee Brewers) didn't renew his contract.

It has been said of Crosetti that he has waved home 16,000 runners in 25 years in the third-base coaching box.

== Death ==
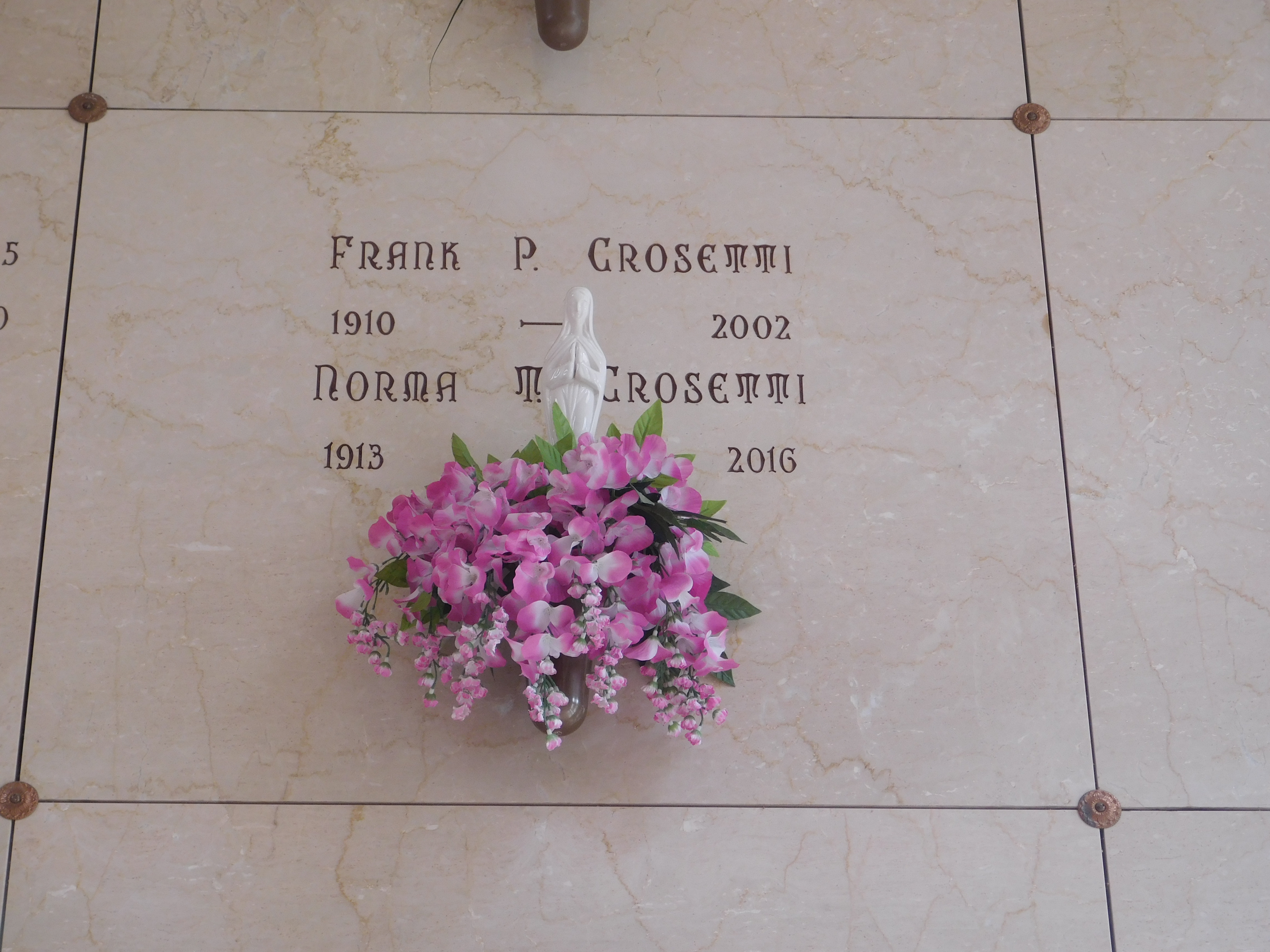
The grave of Crosetti and his wife Norma at Holy Cross Cemetery

Crosetti died in 2002 at age 91 from complications of a fall in Stockton, California and was entombed at Holy Cross Cemetery in Colma. He was survived by his wife of 63 years, Norma, his son, John, and his daughter, Ellen. He was the last surviving member of the 1932, 1936, 1937, and 1939 World Champion New York Yankees.

== See also ==
- List of Major League Baseball career runs scored leaders
- List of Major League Baseball annual stolen base leaders
- List of Major League Baseball players who spent their entire career with one franchise

Preceded by Chuck Dressen	New York Yankees third-base coach 1949–1968	Succeeded by Dick Howser
Preceded by Franchise established	Seattle Pilots third-base coach 1969	Succeeded by Cal Ermer; 1970 Milwaukee Brewers
Preceded by Johnny Goryl	Minnesota Twins third-base coach 1970–1971	Succeeded by Ralph Rowe
