= Oscar Grimes =

American baseball player (1915–1993)

- Infielder
- Born: April 13, 1915; Minerva, Ohio, U.S.
- Died: May 19, 1993 (aged 78); Westlake, Ohio, U.S.
- Batted: Right Threw: Right

MLB debut
- September 28, 1938, for the Cleveland Indians

Last MLB appearance
- September 25, 1946, for the Philadelphia Athletics

MLB statistics
- Batting average: .256
- Home runs: 18
- Runs batted in: 200
- Stats at Baseball Reference

Teams
- Cleveland Indians (1938–1942); New York Yankees (1943–1946); Philadelphia Athletics (1946)

Career highlights and awards
- All-Star (1945)

Oscar Ray Grimes Jr. (April 13, 1915 – May 19, 1993) was an American utility infielder in Major League Baseball who played for the Cleveland Indians (1938–1942), New York Yankees (1943–1946) and Philadelphia Athletics (1946). Grimes batted and threw right-handed.

In a nine-season career, Grimes posted a .256 batting average with 18 home runs and 200 RBI in 602 games played.

== Early life, family and education ==
He was born in Minerva, Ohio. His father Ray Grimes (Oscar Ray Grimes Sr.) and his uncle Roy Grimes also played in the major leagues.

He played semi-pro football for the Minerva Merchants.

== Career ==
During a team practice in 1940, Grimes was hit in the face by an extremely fast-moving ball from a line drive that caused extreme damage to his head, breaking his jaw and nose. His career was in danger as was his eyesight, but he was able to recover and resume playing professional baseball.

After playing five years with the Cleveland Indians, he was traded to the New York Yankees and played third base for them. His final season of pro baseball, for the Philadelphia A's, resulted in a "career-high 64 runs."

After retiring from baseball, Grimes served as a millwright for Republic Steel from 1951–1958 before becoming an apartment superintendent through 1982.

== Personal life and demise ==
Grimes and his wife Dorothy had two daughters, a son, and numerous grandchildren and great-grandchildren during their lifetimes.

Having suffered from Alzheimer's disease and cancer, Grimes died at age 78 in Westlake, Ohio at The Hambidge Center on May 19, 1993.

== See also ==
- List of second-generation Major League Baseball players
