= 1941 Washington Senators season =

1941 Washington Senators
- League: American League
- Ballpark: Griffith Stadium
- City: Washington, D.C.
- Record: 70–84 (.455)
- League place: T–6th
- Owners: Clark Griffith and William Richardson
- Managers: Bucky Harris
- Radio: WMAL (Arch McDonald)

The 1941 Washington Senators won 70 games, lost 84, and finished in sixth place in the American League. They were managed by Bucky Harris and played home games at Griffith Stadium.

== Offseason ==
- Prior to 1941 season: Sonny Dixon was signed by the Senators as an amateur free agent.

== Regular season ==
=== Season standings ===
American League
Team	W	L	Pct.	GB	Home	Road
New York Yankees	101	53	.656	—	51‍–‍26	50‍–‍27
Boston Red Sox	84	70	.545	17	47‍–‍30	37‍–‍40
Chicago White Sox	77	77	.500	24	38‍–‍39	39‍–‍38
Cleveland Indians	75	79	.487	26	42‍–‍35	33‍–‍44
Detroit Tigers	75	79	.487	26	43‍–‍34	32‍–‍45
St. Louis Browns	70	84	.455	31	40‍–‍37	30‍–‍47
Washington Senators	70	84	.455	31	40‍–‍37	30‍–‍47
Philadelphia Athletics	64	90	.416	37	36‍–‍41	28‍–‍49

=== Record vs. opponents ===
1941 American League record Sources:
Team	BOS	CWS	CLE	DET	NYY	PHA	SLB	WSH
Boston	—	16–6	9–13	11–11	9–13–1	16–6	9–13	14–8
Chicago	6–16	—	17–5	12–10–1	8–14	10–12	11–11–1	13–9
Cleveland	13–9	5–17	—	10–12	7–15	15–7	13–9–1	12–10
Detroit	11–11	10–12–1	12–10	—	11–11	13–9	11–11	7–15
New York	13–9–1	14–8	15–7	11–11	—	14–8	18–4	16–6–1
Philadelphia	6–16	12–10	7–15	9–13	8–14	—	11–11	11–11
St. Louis	13–9	11–11–1	9–13–1	11–11	4–18	11–11	—	11–11–1
Washington	8–14	9–13	10–12	15–7	6–16–1	11–11	11–11–1	—

=== Roster ===
1941 Washington Senators
Roster
Pitchers: 18 Red Anderson; 19 Alex Carrasquel; 11,13 Ken Chase; -- Harry Dean; 15 Sid Hudson; 17,22,33 Vern Kennedy; 16 Dutch Leonard; 17 Danny MacFayden; 14 Walt Masterson; -- Ronny Miller; -- Dick Mulligan; 32 Steve Sundra; 11 Early Wynn; 31 Bill Zuber	Catchers: 21 Cliff Bolton; 8,11 Jake Early; 9 Al Evans; 8 Rick Ferrell; Infielders: 7 Morrie Aderholt; 7 George Archie; 8 Jimmy Bloodworth; -- Hillis Layne; -- Charlie Letchas; 1 Buddy Myer; 12 Jimmy Pofahl; 28 Sherry Robertson; 35 Jack Sanford; 5 Cecil Travis; 29 Mickey Vernon	Outfielders: 10 George Case; 4 Ben Chapman; 2 Doc Cramer; 3 Buddy Lewis; -- Roberto Ortiz; 24 Johnny Welaj; 23 Sam West	Manager: 28 Bucky Harris; Coaches: -- Nick Altrock; 27 Benny Bengough; 25 Ossie Bluege; 26 Clyde Milan

== Player stats ==
=== Batting ===
==== Starters by position ====
Note: Pos = Position; G = Games played; AB = At bats; H = Hits; Avg. = Batting average; HR = Home runs; RBI = Runs batted in

Pos	Player	G	AB	H	Avg.	HR	RBI
C	Jake Early	104	355	102	.287	10	54
1B	Mickey Vernon	138	531	159	.299	9	93
2B	Jimmy Bloodworth	142	506	124	.245	7	66
SS	Cecil Travis	152	608	218	.359	7	101
3B	George Archie	105	379	102	.269	3	48
OF	Doc Cramer	154	660	180	.273	2	66
OF	Buddy Lewis	149	569	169	.297	9	72
OF	George Case	153	649	176	.271	2	53

==== Other batters ====
Note: G = Games played; AB = At bats; H = Hits; Avg. = Batting average; HR = Home runs; RBI = Runs batted in

Player	G	AB	H	Avg.	HR	RBI
Al Evans	53	159	44	.277	1	19
Ben Chapman	28	110	28	.255	1	10
Buddy Myer	53	107	27	.252	0	9
Johnny Welaj	49	96	20	.208	0	5
Roberto Ortiz	22	79	26	.329	1	17
Jimmy Pofahl	22	75	14	.187	0	6
Rick Ferrell	21	66	18	.273	0	13
Hillis Layne	13	50	14	.280	0	6
Sam West	26	37	10	.270	0	6
Morrie Aderholt	11	14	2	.143	0	1
Cliff Bolton	14	11	0	.000	0	1
Charlie Letchas	2	8	1	.125	0	1
Jack Sanford	3	5	2	.400	0	0
Sherry Robertson	1	3	0	.000	0	0

=== Pitching ===
==== Starting pitchers ====
Note: G = Games pitched; IP = Innings pitched; W = Wins; L = Losses; ERA = Earned run average; SO = Strikeouts

Player	G	IP	W	L	ERA	SO
Dutch Leonard	34	256.0	18	13	3.45	91
Sid Hudson	33	249.2	13	14	3.46	108
Ken Chase	33	205.2	6	18	5.08	98
Steve Sundra	28	168.1	9	13	5.29	50
Early Wynn	5	40.0	3	1	1.58	15
Dick Mulligan	1	9.0	0	1	5.00	2

==== Other pitchers ====
Note: G = Games pitched; IP = Innings pitched; W = Wins; L = Losses; ERA = Earned run average; SO = Strikeouts

Player	G	IP	W	L	ERA	SO
Bill Zuber	36	96.1	6	4	5.42	51
Vern Kennedy	17	66.1	1	7	5.70	22

==== Relief pitchers ====
Note: G = Games pitched; W = Wins; L = Losses; SV = Saves; ERA = Earned run average; SO = Strikeouts

Player	G	W	L	SV	ERA	SO
Alex Carrasquel	35	6	2	2	3.44	30
Walt Masterson	34	4	3	3	5.97	40
Red Anderson	32	4	6	0	4.18	34
Danny MacFayden	5	0	1	0	10.29	3
Harry Dean	2	0	0	0	4.50	0
Ronny Miller	1	0	0	0	4.50	0

== Farm system ==
Level	Team	League	Manager
A1	Chattanooga Lookouts	Southern Association	Kiki Cuyler and Marv Olson
B	Charlotte Hornets	Piedmont League	Calvin Griffith
B	Greenville Spinners	Sally League	Gus Brittain and George Nix
B	Selma Cloverleafs	Southeastern League	Dale Alexander
D	Orlando Senators	Florida State League	Carl Weigel
D	Thomasville Lookouts	Georgia–Florida League	Bill Rodgers and Kip Sauerbrun

LEAGUE CHAMPIONS: Thomasville
