= 1939 Washington Senators season =

1939 Washington Senators
- League: American League
- Ballpark: Griffith Stadium
- City: Washington, D.C.
- Record: 65–78 (.455)
- League place: 6th
- Owners: Clark Griffith and William Richardson
- Managers: Bucky Harris
- Radio: WJSV (Walter Johnson, Harry McTigue)

The 1939 Washington Senators won 65 games, lost 87, and finished in sixth place in the American League. They were managed by Bucky Harris and played home games at Griffith Stadium.

== Offseason ==
- December 29, 1938: Al Simmons was purchased from the Senators by the Boston Bees for $3,000.

== Season standings ==
American League
Team	W	L	Pct.	GB	Home	Road
New York Yankees	106	45	.702	—	52‍–‍25	54‍–‍20
Boston Red Sox	89	62	.589	17	42‍–‍32	47‍–‍30
Cleveland Indians	87	67	.565	20½	44‍–‍33	43‍–‍34
Chicago White Sox	85	69	.552	22½	50‍–‍27	35‍–‍42
Detroit Tigers	81	73	.526	26½	42‍–‍35	39‍–‍38
Washington Senators	65	87	.428	41½	37‍–‍39	28‍–‍48
Philadelphia Athletics	55	97	.362	51½	28‍–‍48	27‍–‍49
St. Louis Browns	43	111	.279	64½	18‍–‍59	25‍–‍52

=== Record vs. opponents ===
1939 American League record Sources:
Team	BOS	CWS	CLE	DET	NYY	PHA	SLB	WSH
Boston	—	8–14	11–11	10–12	11–8–1	18–4	16–6	15–7
Chicago	14–8	—	12–10	12–10	4–18	11–11	18–4	14–8–1
Cleveland	11–11	10–12	—	11–11	7–15	18–4	16–6	14–8
Detroit	12–10	10–12	11–11	—	9–13	11–11	14–8–1	14–8
New York	8–11–1	18–4	15–7	13–9	—	18–4	19–3	15–7
Philadelphia	4–18	11–11	4–18	11–11	4–18	—	13–9–1	8–12
St. Louis	6–16	4–18	6–16	8–14–1	3–19	9–13–1	—	7–15
Washington	7–15	8–14–1	8–14	8–14	7–15	12–8	15–7	—

=== Roster ===
1939 Washington Senators
Roster
Pitchers: 18 Pete Appleton; -- Dick Bass; 14 Alex Carrasquel; 11 Ken Chase; 15 Jimmie DeShong; 19 Joe Haynes; 50 Bill Holland; 20 Bucky Jacobs; 22 Harry Kelley; 12 Joe Krakauskas; 16 Dutch Leonard; 33 Walt Masterson; 35 Mike Palagyi; 31 Bud Thomas; 44 Lou Thuman; 44 Early Wynn	Catchers: 9 Jake Early; 43 Al Evans; 8 Rick Ferrell; 10 Tony Giuliani; Infielders: 40 Morrie Aderholt; 7 Jimmy Bloodworth; 27 Ossie Bluege; 21 Charlie Gelbert; 10 Ed Leip; 2 Buddy Lewis; 1 Buddy Myer; 17 Bob Prichard; 39 Hal Quick; 5 Cecil Travis; 34 Mickey Vernon; 7 Jimmy Wasdell	Outfielders: 6 George Case; 3 Bobby Estalella; 34 Elmer Gedeon; 17 Bob Loane; 36 Alex Pitko; 24 Johnny Welaj; 23 Sam West; 4 Taffy Wright	Manager: 30 Bucky Harris; Coaches: 28 Nick Altrock; 29 Clyde Milan

== Player stats ==
= Indicates team leader

=== Batting ===
==== Starters by position ====
Note: Pos = Position; G = Games played; AB = At bats; H = Hits; Avg. = Batting average; HR = Home runs; RBI = Runs batted in

Pos	Player	G	AB	H	Avg.	HR	RBI
C	Rick Ferrell	87	274	77	.281	0	31
1B	Mickey Vernon	76	276	71	.257	1	30
2B	Jimmy Bloodworth	83	318	92	.289	4	40
SS	Cecil Travis	130	476	139	.292	5	63
3B	Buddy Lewis	140	536	171	.319	10	75
OF	Taffy Wright	129	499	154	.309	4	93
OF	Sam West	115	390	110	.282	3	52
OF	George Case	128	530	160	.302	2	35

==== Other batters ====
Note: G = Games played; AB = At bats; H = Hits; Avg. = Batting average; HR = Home runs; RBI = Runs batted in

Player	G	AB	H	Avg.	HR	RBI
Bobby Estalella	82	280	77	.275	8	41
Buddy Myer	83	258	78	.302	1	32
Johnny Welaj	63	201	55	.274	1	33
Charlie Gelbert	68	188	48	.255	3	29
Tony Giuliani	54	172	43	.250	0	18
Jimmy Wasdell	29	109	33	.303	0	13
Bob Prichard	26	85	20	.235	0	8
Jake Early	32	84	22	.262	0	14
Ossie Bluege	18	59	9	.153	0	3
Hal Quick	12	41	10	.244	0	2
Ed Leip	9	32	11	.344	0	2
Morrie Aderholt	7	25	5	.200	1	4
Al Evans	7	21	7	.333	0	1
Elmer Gedeon	5	15	3	.200	0	1
Bob Loane	3	9	0	.000	0	1
Alex Pitko	4	8	1	.125	0	1

=== Pitching ===
==== Starting pitchers ====
Note: G = Games pitched; IP = Innings pitched; W = Wins; L = Losses; ERA = Earned run average; SO = Strikeouts

Player	G	IP	W	L	ERA	SO
Dutch Leonard	34	269.1	20	8	3.54	88
Ken Chase	32	232.0	10	19	3.80	118
Joe Krakauskas	39	217.1	11	17	4.60	110
Joe Haynes	27	173.0	8	12	5.36	64
Jimmie DeShong	7	40.2	0	3	8.63	12
Early Wynn	3	20.1	0	2	5.75	1
Dick Bass	1	8.0	0	1	6.75	1

==== Other pitchers ====
Note: G = Games pitched; IP = Innings pitched; W = Wins; L = Losses; ERA = Earned run average; SO = Strikeouts

Player	G	IP	W	L	ERA	SO
Alex Carrasquel	40	159.1	5	9	4.69	41
Walt Masterson	24	58.1	2	2	5.55	12
Harry Kelley	15	53.2	4	3	4.70	20

==== Relief pitchers ====
Note: G = Games pitched; W = Wins; L = Losses; SV = Saves; ERA = Earned run average; SO = Strikeouts

Player	G	W	L	SV	ERA	SO
Pete Appleton	40	5	10	6	4.56	50
Bud Thomas	4	0	0	0	6.00	0
Lou Thuman	3	0	0	0	9.00	1
Bill Holland	3	0	1	0	11.25	2
Bucky Jacobs	2	0	0	0	0.00	1
Mike Palagyi	1	0	0	0	inf	0

== Farm system ==
Level	Team	League	Manager
A1	Chattanooga Lookouts	Southern Association	Kiki Cuyler
A	Springfield Nationals	Eastern League	Spencer Abbott
B	Charlotte Hornets	Piedmont League	Calvin Griffith
B	Greenville Spinners	Sally League	Alex McColl
C	Oswego Netherlands	Canadian–American League	Art Funk and Blaine Kunes
D	Salisbury Indians	Eastern Shore League	Vic Keen and Spud Nachand
D	Orlando Senators	Florida State League	John Ganzel
D	Shelby Nationals	Tar Heel League	Ed Montague
