= 1946 Washington Senators season =

1946 Washington Senators
- League: American League
- Ballpark: Griffith Stadium
- City: Washington, D.C.
- Record: 76–78 (.494)
- League place: 4th
- Owners: Clark Griffith and George H. Richardson
- Managers: Ossie Bluege
- Radio: WWDC (FM)/WPIX (Arch McDonald, Stan Stoller)

The 1946 Washington Senators of Major League Baseball won 76 games, lost 78, and finished in fourth place in the American League. The 46th edition of the franchise was managed by Ossie Bluege and played its home games at Griffith Stadium, where it drew 1,027,216 fans, fifth in the league and tenth-most among the 16 MLB clubs. It was the only time the franchise would exceed one million in home attendance in its 60 years in Washington. In addition, its fourth-place standing represented the highest, and last "first-division", finish for the team during its final 15 seasons in the U.S. capital.

== Offseason ==
- Prior to 1946 season: Dick Weik was signed as an amateur free agent by the Senators.

== Regular season ==
=== Season standings ===
American League
Team	W	L	Pct.	GB	Home	Road
Boston Red Sox	104	50	.675	—	61‍–‍16	43‍–‍34
Detroit Tigers	92	62	.597	12	48‍–‍30	44‍–‍32
New York Yankees	87	67	.565	17	47‍–‍30	40‍–‍37
Washington Senators	76	78	.494	28	38‍–‍38	38‍–‍40
Chicago White Sox	74	80	.481	30	40‍–‍38	34‍–‍42
Cleveland Indians	68	86	.442	36	36‍–‍41	32‍–‍45
St. Louis Browns	66	88	.429	38	35‍–‍41	31‍–‍47
Philadelphia Athletics	49	105	.318	55	31‍–‍46	18‍–‍59

=== Record vs. opponents ===
1946 American League record Sources:
Team	BOS	CWS	CLE	DET	NYY	PHA	SLB	WSH
Boston	—	13–9	15–7	15–7–1	14–8	17–5	14–8–1	16–6
Chicago	9–13	—	13–9–1	10–12	8–14	12–10	12–10	10–12
Cleveland	7–15	9–13–1	—	5–17	10–12	15–7	15–7–1	7–15
Detroit	7–15–1	12–10	17–5	—	13–9	17–5	14–8	12–10
New York	8–14	14–8	12–10	9–13	—	16–6	14–8	14–8
Philadelphia	5–17	10–12	7–15	5–17	6–16	—	10–12	6–16–1
St. Louis	8–14–1	10–12	7–15–1	8–14	8–14	12–10	—	13–9
Washington	6–16	12–10	15–7	10–12	8–14	16–6–1	9–13	—

=== Notable transactions ===
- April 12, 1946: Jug Thesenga was released by the Senators.
- June 15, 1946: Jeff Heath was traded by the Senators to the St. Louis Browns for Joe Grace and Al LaMacchia.

=== Roster ===
1946 Washington Senators
Roster
Pitchers: 18 Milo Candini; 36 Vern Curtis; 10 Mickey Haefner; 14,18 Sid Hudson; 20,38 Bill Kennedy; 38 Al LaMacchia; 16 Dutch Leonard; 23,35 Walt Masterson; 00 Bobo Newsom; 12 Johnny Niggeling; 15 Marino Pieretti; 21 Ray Scarborough; 34,44 Jake Wade; 19,20 Max Wilson; 17 Roger Wolff; 26 Early Wynn	Catchers: 8 Jake Early; 11 Al Evans; 9 Mike Guerra; Infielders: 27,55 Billy Hitchcock; 26 Joe Kuhel; 24 George Myatt; 6 Jerry Priddy; 1 Sherry Robertson; 27 Jack Sanford; 25 Gil Torres; 7 Cecil Travis; 4 Mickey Vernon; 28 Eddie Yost	Outfielders: 23 George Binks; 22 Gil Coan; 39 Ray Goolsby; 19 Joe Grace; 3 Jeff Heath; 2 Buddy Lewis; 5 Stan Spence	Manager: 30 Ossie Bluege; Coaches: 33 Nick Altrock; 37 Rick Ferrell; 29 Joe Fitzgerald; 38 Joe Judge; 31 Clyde Milan; 34 Bert Shepard

== Player stats ==
=== Batting ===
==== Starters by position ====
Note: Pos = Position; G = Games played; AB = At bats; H = Hits; Avg. = Batting average; HR = Home runs; RBI = Runs batted in

Pos	Player	G	AB	H	Avg.	HR	RBI
C	Al Evans	88	272	69	.254	2	30
1B	Mickey Vernon	148	587	207	.353	8	85
2B	Jerry Priddy	138	511	130	.254	6	58
SS	Cecil Travis	137	465	117	.252	1	56
3B	Billy Hitchcock	98	354	75	.212	0	25
OF	Joe Grace	77	321	97	.302	2	31
OF	Stan Spence	152	578	169	.292	16	87
OF	Buddy Lewis	150	582	170	.292	7	45

==== Other batters ====
Note: G = Games played; AB = At bats; H = Hits; Avg. = Batting average; HR = Home runs; RBI = Runs batted in

Player	G	AB	H	Avg.	HR	RBI
Sherry Robertson	74	230	46	.200	6	19
Jake Early	64	189	38	.201	4	18
Gil Torres	63	185	47	.254	0	13
Jeff Heath	48	166	47	.283	4	27
Gil Coan	59	134	28	.209	3	9
George Binks	65	134	26	.194	0	12
Mike Guerra	41	83	21	.253	0	4
George Myatt	15	34	8	.235	0	4
Jack Sanford	10	28	6	.214	0	1
Eddie Yost	8	25	2	.080	0	1
Joe Kuhel	14	20	3	.150	0	2
Ray Goolsby	3	4	0	.000	0	0

=== Pitching ===
==== Starting pitchers ====
Note: G = Games pitched; IP = Innings pitched; W = Wins; L = Losses; ERA = Earned run average; SO = Strikeouts

Player	G	IP	W	L	ERA	SO
Mickey Haefner	33	227.2	14	11	2.85	85
Bobo Newsom	24	178.0	11	8	2.78	82
Dutch Leonard	26	161.2	10	10	3.56	62
Roger Wolff	21	122.0	5	8	2.58	50
Early Wynn	17	107.0	8	5	3.11	36
Johnny Niggeling	8	38.0	3	2	4.03	10

==== Other pitchers ====
Note: G = Games pitched; IP = Innings pitched; W = Wins; L = Losses; ERA = Earned run average; SO = Strikeouts

Player	G	IP	W	L	ERA	SO
Ray Scarborough	32	155.2	7	11	4.05	46
Sid Hudson	31	142.2	8	11	3.60	35
Walt Masterson	29	91.1	5	6	6.01	61

==== Relief pitchers ====
Note: G = Games pitched; W = Wins; L = Losses; SV = Saves; ERA = Earned run average; SO = Strikeouts

Player	G	W	L	SV	ERA	SO
Bill Kennedy	21	1	2	3	6.00	18
Marino Pieretti	30	2	2	0	5.95	20
Vern Curtis	11	0	0	0	7.16	7
Milo Candini	9	2	0	1	2.08	6
Max Wilson	9	0	1	0	7.11	8
Jake Wade	6	0	0	0	4.76	9
Gil Torres	3	0	0	1	7.71	2
Al LaMacchia	2	0	1	0	16.88	0

== Farm system ==
Level	Team	League	Manager
AA	Chattanooga Lookouts	Southern Association	Bert Niehoff
B	Pensacola Fliers	Southeastern League	Bill McGhee
B	Charlotte Hornets	Tri-State League	Spencer Abbott
D	Kingsport Cherokees	Appalachian League	Hobe Brummette and Red Mincy
D	Orlando Senators	Florida State League	Ed Madjeski

LEAGUE CHAMPIONS: Orlando
