= List of Major League Baseball players (K) =

The following is a list of Major League Baseball players, retired or active. As of the end of the 2011 season, there have been 661 players with a last name that begins with K who have been on a major league roster at some point.

== K ==
For reasons of space, this list has been split into two pages:

- Kila Ka'aihue through Malachi Kittridge
- Hugo Klaerner through Andy Kyle
