= List of Major League Baseball players (Kj–Kz) =

The following is a list of Major League Baseball players, retired or active.

== Kj through Kz ==
Name	Debut	Final game	Position	Teams	Ref
Hugo Klaerner	September 10, 1934	September 22, 1934	Pitcher	Chicago White Sox	
Fred Klages	September 11, 1966	September 11, 1967	Pitcher	Chicago White Sox	
Danny Klassen	July 4, 1998	September 25, 2003	Utility infielder	Arizona Diamondbacks, Detroit Tigers	
Billy Klaus	April 16, 1952	May 17, 1963	Shortstop	Boston Braves/Milwaukee Braves, Boston Red Sox, Baltimore Orioles, Washington Senators, Philadelphia Phillies	
Bobby Klaus	April 21, 1964	October 3, 1965	Second baseman	Cincinnati Reds, New York Mets	
Al Klawitter	September 20, 1909	May 30, 1913	Pitcher	New York Giants, Detroit Tigers	
Tom Klawitter	April 14, 1985	May 21, 1985	Pitcher	Minnesota Twins	
Ollie Klee	August 10, 1925	August 26, 1925	Outfielder	Cincinnati Reds	
Chuck Klein β	July 30, 1928	June 11, 1944	Outfielder	Philadelphia Phillies, Chicago Cubs, Pittsburgh Pirates	
Lou Klein	April 21, 1943	September 30, 1951	Second baseman	St. Louis Cardinals, Cleveland Indians, Philadelphia Athletics	
Hal Kleine	April 26, 1944	June 1, 1945	Pitcher	Cleveland Indians	
Ted Kleinhans	April 20, 1934	April 20, 1938	Pitcher	Philadelphia Phillies, Cincinnati Reds, New York Yankees	
Nubs Kleinke	April 25, 1935	October 3, 1937	Pitcher	St. Louis Cardinals	
Red Kleinow	May 3, 1904	September 6, 1911	Catcher	New York Highlanders, Boston Red Sox, Philadelphia Phillies	
Ed Klepfer	July 4, 1911	September 5, 1919	Pitcher	New York Highlanders/Yankees, Chicago White Sox, Cleveland Indians	
Ryan Klesko	September 12, 1992	September 25, 2007	Utility player	Atlanta Braves, San Diego Padres, San Francisco Giants	
Jay Kleven	June 20, 1976	June 27, 1976	Catcher	New York Mets	
Ed Klieman	September 24, 1943	June 2, 1950	Pitcher	Cleveland Indians, Washington Senators, Chicago White Sox, Philadelphia Athletics	
Lou Klimchock	September 27, 1958	August 2, 1970	Utility infielder	Kansas City Athletics, Milwaukee Braves, Washington Senators (1961–71), New York Mets, Cleveland Indians	
Ron Klimkowski	September 15, 1969	September 22, 1972	Pitcher	New York Yankees, Oakland Athletics	
Bob Kline	September 17, 1930	July 15, 1934	Pitcher	Boston Red Sox, Philadelphia Athletics, Washington Senators	
Bobby Kline	April 11, 1955	September 25, 1955	Shortstop	Washington Senators	
Ron Kline	April 21, 1952	June 13, 1970	Pitcher	Los Angeles Angels, Detroit Tigers, Washington Senators (1961–71), Minnesota Twins, San Francisco Giants, Boston Red Sox, Atlanta Braves	
Steve Kline (RHP)	July 10, 1970	July 24, 1977	Pitcher	New York Yankees, Cleveland Indians, Atlanta Braves	
Steve Kline (LHP)	April 2, 1997	September 25, 2007	Pitcher	Cleveland Indians, Montreal Expos, St. Louis Cardinals, Baltimore Orioles, San Francisco Giants	
Bill Kling	August 13, 1891	April 20, 1895	Pitcher	Philadelphia Phillies, Baltimore Orioles (NL), Louisville Colonels	
Johnny Kling	September 11, 1900	September 21, 1913	Catcher	Chicago Orphans/Cubs, Boston Rustlers/Braves, Cincinnati Reds	
Rudy Kling	September 21, 1902	September 26, 1902	Shortstop	St. Louis Cardinals	
Scott Klingenbeck	June 2, 1994	June 23, 1998	Pitcher	Baltimore Orioles, Minnesota Twins, Cincinnati Reds	
Bob Klinger	April 19, 1938	September 23, 1947	Pitcher	Pittsburgh Pirates, Boston Red Sox	
Joe Klinger	September 13, 1927	May 13, 1930	Utility player	New York Giants, Chicago White Sox	
Joe Klink	April 9, 1987	May 17, 1996	Pitcher	Minnesota Twins, Oakland Athletics, Florida Marlins, Seattle Mariners	
Johnny Klippstein	May 3, 1950	May 27, 1967	Pitcher	Chicago Cubs, Cincinnati Redlegs, Los Angeles Dodgers, Washington Senators (1961–71), Cincinnati Reds, Philadelphia Phillies, Minnesota Twins, Detroit Tigers	
Fred Klobedanz	August 20, 1896	September 5, 1902	Pitcher	Boston Beaneaters	
Stan Klopp	April 30, 1944	August 5, 1944	Pitcher	Boston Braves	
Nap Kloza	August 16, 1931	June 26, 1932	Outfielder	St. Louis Browns	
Corey Kluber	September 1, 2011		Pitcher	Cleveland Indians	
Joe Klugmann	September 23, 1921	July 19, 1925	Second baseman	Chicago Cubs, Brooklyn Dodgers, Cleveland Indians	
Elmer Klumpp	April 17, 1934	May 3, 1937	Catcher	Washington Senators, Brooklyn Dodgers	
Billy Klusman	June 21, 1888	May 8, 1890	Second baseman	Boston Beaneaters, St. Louis Browns	
Ted Kluszewski	April 18, 1947	October 1, 1961	First baseman	Cincinnati Reds/Redlegs, Pittsburgh Pirates, Chicago White Sox, Los Angeles Angels	
Mickey Klutts	July 7, 1976	July 26, 1983	Third baseman	New York Yankees, Oakland Athletics, Toronto Blue Jays	
Clyde Kluttz	April 20, 1942	September 27, 1952	Catcher	Boston Braves, New York Giants, St. Louis Cardinals, Pittsburgh Pirates, St. Louis Browns, Washington Senators	
Joe Kmak	April 6, 1993	August 27, 1995	Catcher	Milwaukee Brewers, Chicago Cubs	
Otto Knabe	October 3, 1905	September 25, 1916	Second baseman	Pittsburgh Pirates, Philadelphia Phillies, Baltimore Terrapins, Chicago Cubs	
Brent Knackert	April 10, 1990	June 4, 1996	Pitcher	Seattle Mariners, Boston Red Sox	
Chris Knapp	September 4, 1975	October 5, 1980	Pitcher	Chicago White Sox, California Angels	
Cotton Knaupp	August 30, 1910	April 28, 1911	Shortstop	Cleveland Naps	
Frank Knauss	June 25, 1890	May 29, 1895	Pitcher	Columbus Solons, Cleveland Spiders, Cincinnati Reds, New York Giants	
Rudy Kneisch	September 21, 1926	September 26, 1926	Pitcher	Detroit Tigers	
Phil Knell	July 6, 1888	September 29, 1895	Pitcher	Pittsburgh Alleghenys, Philadelphia Athletics (1890–91), Columbus Solons, Washington Senators (NL), Philadelphia Phillies, Pittsburgh Pirates, Louisville Colonels, Cleveland Spiders	
Bob Knepper	September 10, 1976	June 24, 1990	Pitcher	San Francisco Giants, Houston Astros	
Charlie Knepper	May 26, 1899	September 26, 1899	Pitcher	Cleveland Spiders	
Lou Knerr	April 17, 1945	June 7, 1947	Pitcher	Philadelphia Athletics, Washington Senators	
Elmer Knetzer	September 11, 1909	June 18, 1917	Pitcher	Brooklyn Superbas/Dodgers, Pittsburgh Rebels, Boston Braves, Cincinnati Reds	
Alan Knicely	August 12, 1979	October 4, 1986	Catcher	Houston Astros, Cincinnati Reds, Philadelphia Phillies, St. Louis Cardinals	
Austin Knickerbocker	April 19, 1947	September 28, 1947	Outfielder	Philadelphia Athletics	
Bill Knickerbocker	April 12, 1933	September 17, 1942	Shortstop	Cleveland Indians, St. Louis Browns, New York Yankees, Chicago White Sox, Philadelphia Athletics	
Brandon Knight	June 5, 2001	September 17, 2008	Pitcher	New York Yankees, New York Mets	
George Knight	September 28, 1875	September 28, 1875	Pitcher	New Haven Elm Citys	
Jack Knight	September 20, 1922	April 25, 1927	Pitcher	St. Louis Cardinals, Philadelphia Phillies, Boston Braves	
Joe Knight	May 16, 1884	October 3, 1890	Outfielder	Philadelphia Quakers, Cincinnati Reds	
John Knight	April 14, 1905	October 4, 1913	Utility infielder	Philadelphia Athletics, Boston Americans, New York Highlanders, Washington Senators, New York Yankees	
Lon Knight	September 4, 1875	October 10, 1885	Outfielder	Philadelphia Athletics (1860–76), Worcester Ruby Legs, Detroit Wolverines, Philadelphia Athletics (AA), Providence Grays	
Ray Knight	September 10, 1974	October 2, 1988	Third baseman	Cincinnati Reds, Houston Astros, New York Mets, Baltimore Orioles, Detroit Tigers	
Pete Knisely	September 4, 1912	September 23, 1915	Outfielder	Cincinnati Reds, Chicago Cubs	
Chuck Knoblauch	April 9, 1991	September 27, 2002	Second baseman	Minnesota Twins, New York Yankees, Kansas City Royals	
Mike Knode	June 28, 1920	September 26, 1920	Outfielder	St. Louis Cardinals	
Ray Knode	June 30, 1923	September 26, 1926	First baseman	Cleveland Indians	
Justin Knoedler	October 3, 2004	September 30, 2006	Catcher	San Francisco Giants	
Punch Knoll	April 27, 1905	October 4, 1905	Outfielder	Washington Senators	
Hub Knolls	May 1, 1906	May 6, 1906	Pitcher	Brooklyn Superbas	
Bobby Knoop	April 13, 1964	September 20, 1972	Second baseman	Los Angeles/California Angels, Chicago White Sox, Kansas City Royals	
Randy Knorr	September 5, 1991	September 9, 2001	Catcher	Toronto Blue Jays, Houston Astros, Florida Marlins, Texas Rangers, Montreal Expos	
Fritz Knothe	April 12, 1932	August 30, 1933	Third baseman	Boston Braves, Philadelphia Phillies	
George Knothe	April 25, 1932	May 25, 1932	Second baseman	Philadelphia Phillies	
Eric Knott	September 1, 2001	August 26, 2003	Pitcher	Arizona Diamondbacks, Montreal Expos	
Jack Knott	April 13, 1933	May 15, 1946	Pitcher	St. Louis Browns, Chicago White Sox, Philadelphia Athletics	
Jon Knott	May 30, 2004	July 22, 2007	Outfielder	San Diego Padres, Baltimore Orioles	
Gary Knotts	July 28, 2001	October 2, 2004	Pitcher	Florida Marlins, Detroit Tigers	
Joe Knotts	September 18, 1907	September 28, 1907	Catcher	Boston Doves	
Ed Knouff	July 1, 1885	June 7, 1889	Pitcher	Philadelphia Athletics (AA), Baltimore Orioles (AA), St. Louis Browns (AA), Cleveland Blues	
Jake Knowdell	May 15, 1874	August 17, 1878	Catcher	Brooklyn Atlantics, Milwaukee Grays	
Darold Knowles	April 18, 1965	April 18, 1980	Pitcher	Baltimore Orioles, Philadelphia Phillies, Washington Senators (1961–71), Oakland Athletics, Chicago Cubs, Texas Rangers, Montreal Expos, St. Louis Cardinals	
Jimmy Knowles	May 2, 1884	October 12, 1892	Third baseman	Pittsburgh Alleghenys, Brooklyn Atlantics (AA), Washington Nationals (1886–1889), New York Metropolitans, Rochester Broncos, New York Giants	
Tom Knowlson	July 3, 1915	September 13, 1915	Pitcher	Philadelphia Athletics	
Bill Knowlton	September 3, 1920	September 3, 1920	Pitcher	Philadelphia Athletics	
Andy Knox	September 19, 1890	October 12, 1890	First baseman	Philadelphia Athletics (AA)	
Cliff Knox	July 1, 1924	July 14, 1924	Catcher	Pittsburgh Pirates	
John Knox	August 1, 1972	September 26, 1975	Second baseman	Detroit Tigers	
Kurt Knudsen	May 16, 1992	June 4, 1994	Pitcher	Detroit Tigers	
Mark Knudson	July 8, 1985	May 14, 1993	Pitcher	Houston Astros, Milwaukee Brewers, Colorado Rockies	
Nick Koback	July 29, 1953	July 4, 1955	Catcher	Pittsburgh Pirates	
Masahide Kobayashi	April 2, 2008	May 7, 2009	Pitcher	Cleveland Indians	
Kevin Kobel	September 8, 1973	June 7, 1980	Pitcher	Milwaukee Brewers, New York Mets	
Alan Koch	July 26, 1963	September 26, 1964	Pitcher	Detroit Tigers, Washington Senators (1961–71)	
Barney Koch	July 23, 1944	October 1, 1944	Second baseman	Brooklyn Dodgers	
Billy Koch	May 5, 1999	August 26, 2004	Pitcher	Toronto Blue Jays, Oakland Athletics, Chicago White Sox, Florida Marlins	
Brad Kocher	April 24, 1912	October 5, 1916	Catcher	Detroit Tigers, New York Giants	
Dick Koecher	September 29, 1946	October 2, 1948	Pitcher	Philadelphia Phillies	
Pete Koegel	September 1, 1970	October 2, 1972	Utility player	Milwaukee Brewers, Philadelphia Phillies	
Ben Koehler	April 23, 1905	October 7, 1906	Outfielder	St. Louis Browns	
Pip Koehler	April 22, 1925	September 12, 1925	Outfielder	New York Giants	
Brian Koelling	August 21, 1993	September 3, 1993	Utility infielder	Cincinnati Reds	
Len Koenecke	April 12, 1932	September 15, 1935	Outfielder	New York Giants, Brooklyn Dodgers	
Mark Koenig	September 8, 1925	September 27, 1936	Shortstop	New York Yankees, Detroit Tigers, Chicago Cubs, Cincinnati Reds, New York Giants	
Will Koenigsmark	September 10, 1919	September 10, 1919	Pitcher	St. Louis Cardinals	
Elmer Koestner	April 23, 1910	July 1, 1914	Pitcher	Cleveland Naps, Chicago Cubs, Cincinnati Reds	
Henry Kohler	July 12, 1871	September 9, 1874	Utility player	Fort Wayne Kekiongas, Baltimore Marylands, Baltimore Canaries	
Joe Kohlman	September 26, 1937	May 26, 1938	Pitcher	Washington Senators	
Ryan Kohlmeier	July 29, 2000	October 5, 2001	Pitcher	Baltimore Orioles	
Michael Kohn	July 26, 2010		Pitcher	Los Angeles Angels of Anaheim	
Dick Kokos	July 8, 1948	May 10, 1954	Outfielder	St. Louis Browns/Baltimore Orioles	
Brandon Kolb	May 12, 2000	September 19, 2001	Pitcher	San Diego Padres, Milwaukee Brewers	
Danny Kolb	June 4, 1999	June 20, 2007	Pitcher	Texas Rangers, Milwaukee Brewers, Atlanta Braves, Pittsburgh Pirates	
Eddie Kolb	October 15, 1899	October 15, 1899	Pitcher	Cleveland Spiders	
Gary Kolb	September 7, 1960	September 1, 1969	Outfielder	St. Louis Cardinals, Milwaukee Braves, New York Mets, Pittsburgh Pirates	
Don Kolloway	September 16, 1940	April 21, 1953	Second baseman	Chicago White Sox, Detroit Tigers, Philadelphia Athletics	
Ray Kolp	April 16, 1921	September 21, 1934	Pitcher	St. Louis Browns, Cincinnati Reds	
Karl Kolseth	September 30, 1915	October 3, 1915	First baseman	Baltimore Terrapins	
Hal Kolstad	April 22, 1962	July 17, 1963	Pitcher	Boston Red Sox	
Shane Komine	July 30, 2006	July 17, 2007	Pitcher	Oakland Athletics	
Satoru Komiyama	April 4, 2002	September 11, 2002	Pitcher	New York Mets	
Fred Kommers	June 25, 1913	September 26, 1914	Outfielder	Pittsburgh Pirates, St. Louis Terriers, Baltimore Terrapins	
Brad Komminsk	August 14, 1983	October 5, 1991	Outfielder	Atlanta Braves, Milwaukee Brewers, Cleveland Indians, San Francisco Giants, Baltimore Orioles, Oakland Athletics	
Paul Konerko	September 8, 1997		First baseman	Los Angeles Dodgers	
Ed Konetchy	June 29, 1907	October 1, 1921	First baseman	St. Louis Cardinals, Pittsburgh Pirates, Pittsburgh Rebels, Boston Braves, Brooklyn Robins, Philadelphia Phillies	
Doug Konieczny	September 11, 1973	April 30, 1977	Pitcher	Houston Astros	
Alex Konikowski	June 16, 1948	July 29, 1954	Pitcher	New York Giants	
Mike Konnick	October 3, 1909	May 24, 1910	Catcher	Cincinnati Reds	
Bruce Konopka	June 7, 1942	September 29, 1946	First baseman	Philadelphia Athletics	
Jim Konstanty	June 18, 1944	September 19, 1956	Pitcher	Cincinnati Reds, Boston Braves, Philadelphia Phillies, New York Yankees, St. Louis Cardinals	
George Kontos	September 10, 2011		Pitcher	New York Yankees	
Dennis Konuszewski	August 4, 1995	August 4, 1995	Pitcher	Pittsburgh Pirates	
Dae-Sung Koo	April 4, 2005	August 20, 2005	Pitcher	New York Mets	
Ernie Koob	June 23, 1915	August 30, 1919	Pitcher	St. Louis Browns	
Cal Koonce	April 14, 1962	August 8, 1971	Pitcher	Chicago Cubs, New York Mets, Boston Red Sox	
Graham Koonce	September 20, 2003	September 28, 2003	First baseman	Oakland Athletics	
Harry Koons	April 17, 1884	July 5, 1884	Third baseman	Altoona Mountain City, Chicago Browns/Pittsburgh Stogies	
Jerry Koosman	April 14, 1967	August 21, 1985	Pitcher	New York Mets, Minnesota Twins, Chicago White Sox, Philadelphia Phillies	
George Kopacz	September 18, 1966	September 29, 1970	First baseman	Atlanta Braves, Pittsburgh Pirates	
Larry Kopf	September 2, 1913	June 16, 1923	Shortstop	Cleveland Naps, Philadelphia Athletics, Cincinnati Reds, Boston Braves	
Wally Kopf	October 1, 1921	October 2, 1921	Third baseman	New York Giants	
Howie Koplitz	September 8, 1961	April 24, 1966	Pitcher	Detroit Tigers, Washington Senators (1961–71)	
Mike Koplove	September 6, 2001	September 26, 2007	Pitcher	Arizona Diamondbacks, Cleveland Indians	
Merlin Kopp	August 2, 1915	September 29, 1919	Outfielder	Washington Senators, Philadelphia Athletics	
Joe Koppe	August 9, 1958	September 11, 1965	Shortstop	Milwaukee Braves, Philadelphia Athletics, Los Angeles/California Angels	
George Kopshaw	August 4, 1923	August 5, 1923	Catcher	St. Louis Cardinals	
Steve Korcheck	September 6, 1954	September 27, 1959	Catcher	Washington Senators	
Bobby Korecky	April 26, 2008		Pitcher	Minnesota Twins, Arizona Diamondbacks	
Art Kores	July 24, 1915	October 3, 1915	Third baseman	St. Louis Terriers	
George Korince	September 10, 1966	May 27, 1967	Pitcher	Detroit Tigers	
John Koronka	June 1, 2005		Pitcher	Chicago Cubs, Texas Rangers, Florida Marlins	
Jim Korwan	April 24, 1894	July 17, 1897	Pitcher	Brooklyn Grooms, Chicago Colts	
Andy Kosco	August 13, 1965	July 30, 1974	Outfielder	Minnesota Twins, New York Yankees, Los Angeles Dodgers, Milwaukee Brewers, California Angels, Boston Red Sox, Cincinnati Reds	
Joe Koshansky	September 1, 2007	September 27, 2008	First baseman	Colorado Rockies	
Clem Koshorek	April 15, 1952	April 14, 1953	Utility infielder	Pittsburgh Pirates	
Bill Koski	April 28, 1951	September 22, 1951	Pitcher	Pittsburgh Pirates	
Corey Koskie	September 9, 1998	July 5, 2006	Third baseman	Minnesota Twins, Toronto Blue Jays, Milwaukee Brewers	
Dave Koslo	September 12, 1941	April 14, 1955	Pitcher	New York Giants, Baltimore Orioles, Milwaukee Braves	
Kevin Koslofski	June 28, 1992	July 7, 1996	Outfielder	Kansas City Royals, Milwaukee Brewers	
Mike Kosman	April 20, 1944	April 20, 1944	Pinch runner	Cincinnati Reds	
Joe Kostal	July 14, 1896	July 17, 1896	Pitcher	Louisville Colonels	
Fred Koster	April 27, 1931	September 27, 1931	Outfielder	Philadelphia Phillies	
Frank Kostro	September 2, 1962	September 21, 1969	Utility player	Detroit Tigers, Los Angeles Angels, Minnesota Twins	
Casey Kotchman	May 9, 2004		First baseman	Anaheim Angels/Los Angeles Angels of Anaheim, Atlanta Braves, Boston Red Sox, Seattle Mariners, Tampa Bay Rays	
Mark Kotsay	July 11, 1997		Outfielder	Florida Marlins, San Diego Padres, Oakland Athletics, Atlanta Braves, Boston Red Sox, Chicago White Sox, Milwaukee Brewers	
George Kottaras	September 13, 2008		Catcher	Bostom Red Sox, Milwaukee Brewers	
Sandy Koufax β	June 24, 1955	October 2, 1966	Pitcher	Brooklyn/Los Angeles Dodgers	
Joe Koukalik	September 1, 1904	September 1, 1904	Pitcher	Brooklyn Superbas	
Lou Koupal	April 17, 1925	September 26, 1937	Pitcher	Pittsburgh Pirates, Brooklyn Robins, Philadelphia Phillies, St. Louis Browns	
Kevin Kouzmanoff	September 2, 2006		Third baseman	Cleveland Indians, San Diego Padres, Oakland Athletics, Colorado Rockies	
Fabian Kowalik	September 4, 1932	September 27, 1936	Pitcher	Chicago White Sox, Chicago Cubs, Philadelphia Phillies, Boston Bees	
Brian Kowitz	June 4, 1995	June 16, 1995	Outfielder	Atlanta Braves	
Ernie Koy	April 19, 1938	September 27, 1942	Outfielder	Brooklyn Dodgers, St. Louis Cardinals, Cincinnati Reds, Philadelphia Phillies	
Al Kozar	April 19, 1948	July 2, 1950	Second baseman	Washington Senators, Chicago White Sox	
Ben Kozlowski	September 19, 2002	September 28, 2002	Pitcher	Texas Rangers	
Pete Kozma	May 18, 2011		Second baseman	St. Louis Cardinals	
Joe Kracher	September 17, 1939	September 30, 1939	Catcher	Philadelphia Phillies	
Joe Kraemer	August 22, 1989	June 25, 1990	Pitcher	Chicago Cubs	
Clarence Kraft	May 1, 1914	May 15, 1914	First baseman	Boston Braves	
Joe Krakauskas	September 9, 1937	September 18, 1946	Pitcher	Washington Senators, Cleveland Indians	
Jack Kralick	April 15, 1959	April 23, 1967	Pitcher	Washington Senators/Minnesota Twins, Cleveland Indians	
Steve Kraly	August 9, 1953	September 15, 1953	Pitcher	New York Yankees	
Jack Kramer	April 25, 1939	August 22, 1951	Pitcher	St. Louis Browns, Boston Red Sox, New York Giants, New York Yankees	
Randy Kramer	September 11, 1988	June 23, 1992	Pitcher	Pittsburgh Pirates, Chicago Cubs, Seattle Mariners	
Tom Kramer	September 12, 1991	September 21, 1993	Pitcher	Cleveland Indians	
Ed Kranepool	September 22, 1962	September 30, 1979	First baseman	New York Mets	
Gene Krapp	April 14, 1911	September 30, 1915	Pitcher	Cleveland Naps, Buffalo Blues	
Erik Kratz	July 17, 2010		Catcher	Pittsburgh Pirates, Philadelphia Phillies	
Jack Kraus	April 25, 1943	September 11, 1946	Pitcher	Philadelphia Phillies, New York Giants	
Charlie Krause	July 27, 1901	July 27, 1901	Second baseman	Cincinnati Reds	
Harry Krause	April 20, 1908	July 28, 1912	Pitcher	Philadelphia Athletics, Cleveland Indians	
Lew Krausse Sr.	June 11, 1931	September 2, 1932	Pitcher	Philadelphia Athletics	
Lew Krausse Jr.	June 16, 1961	September 23, 1974	Pitcher	Kansas City/Oakland Athletics, Milwaukee Brewers, Boston Red Sox, St. Louis Cardinals, Atlanta Braves	
Ken Kravec	September 4, 1975	October 3, 1982	Pitcher	Chicago White Sox, Chicago Cubs	
Danny Kravitz	April 17, 1956	September 18, 1960	Catcher	Pittsburgh Pirates, Kansas City Athletics	
Ray Krawczyk	June 29, 1984	April 28, 1989	Pitcher	Pittsburgh Pirates, California Angels, Milwaukee Brewers	
Frank Kreeger	July 28, 1884	July 28, 1884	Utility player	Kansas City Cowboys (UA)	
Mike Kreevich	September 7, 1931	September 23, 1945	Outfielder	Chicago Cubs, Chicago White Sox, Philadelphia Athletics, St. Louis Browns, Washington Senators	
Charlie Krehmeyer	July 8, 1884	July 19, 1885	Utility player	St. Louis Browns (AA), Louisville Colonels, St. Louis Maroons	
Mickey Kreitner	September 28, 1943	August 17, 1944	Catcher	Chicago Cubs	
Ralph Kreitz	August 1, 1911	October 8, 1911	Catcher	Chicago White Sox	
Ray Kremer	April 18, 1924	July 1, 1933	Pitcher	Pittsburgh Pirates	
Jimmy Kremers	June 5, 1990	October 3, 1990	Catcher	Atlanta Braves	
Jim Kremmel	July 4, 1973	September 25, 1974	Pitcher	Texas Rangers, Chicago Cubs	
Wayne Krenchicki	June 15, 1979	September 22, 1986	Third baseman	Baltimore Orioles, Cincinnati Reds, Detroit Tigers, Montreal Expos	
Chuck Kress	April 16, 1947	July 8, 1954	First baseman	Cincinnati Reds, Chicago White Sox, Detroit Tigers, Brooklyn Dodgers	
Red Kress	September 24, 1927	July 17, 1946	Shortstop	St. Louis Browns, Chicago White Sox, Washington Senators, Detroit Tigers, New York Giants	
Lou Kretlow	September 26, 1946	September 23, 1956	Pitcher	Detroit Tigers, St. Louis Browns, Chicago White Sox, Baltimore Orioles, Kansas City Athletics	
Rick Kreuger	September 6, 1975	May 7, 1978	Pitcher	Boston Red Sox, Cleveland Indians	
Chad Kreuter	September 14, 1988	April 27, 2003	Catcher	Texas Rangers, Detroit Tigers, Seattle Mariners, Chicago White Sox, Anaheim Angels, Kansas City Royals, Los Angeles Dodgers	
Frank Kreutzer	September 20, 1962	May 12, 1969	Pitcher	Chicago White Sox, Washington Senators (1961–71)	
Paul Krichell	May 12, 1911	September 22, 1912	Catcher	St. Louis Browns	
Bill Krieg	April 20, 1884	June 15, 1887	Utility player	Chicago Browns/Pittsburgh Stogies, Chicago White Stockings, Brooklyn Grays, Washington Nationals (1886–1889)	
Kurt Krieger	April 21, 1949	September 11, 1951	Pitcher	St. Louis Cardinals	
Howie Krist	September 12, 1937	September 7, 1946	Pitcher	St. Louis Cardinals	
Rick Krivda	July 7, 1995	September 8, 1998	Pitcher	Baltimore Orioles, Cleveland Indians, Cincinnati Reds	
Gus Krock	April 24, 1888	July 26, 1890	Pitcher	Chicago White Stockings, Indianapolis Hoosiers (NL), Washington Nationals (1886–1889), Buffalo Bisons (PL)	
Josh Kroeger	September 2, 2004	October 2, 2004	Outfielder	Arizona Diamondbacks	
Zach Kroenke	September 10, 2010		Pitcher	Arizona Diamondbacks	
Rube Kroh	September 30, 1906	August 22, 1912	Pitcher	Boston Americans, Chicago Cubs, Boston Braves	
Gary Kroll	July 26, 1964	July 12, 1969	Pitcher	Philadelphia Phillies, New York Mets, Houston Astros, Cleveland Indians	
John Kroner	September 29, 1935	September 29, 1938	Second baseman	Boston Red Sox, Cleveland Indians	
Marc Kroon	July 7, 1995	June 29, 2004	Pitcher	San Diego Padres, Cincinnati Reds, Colorado Rockies	
Mike Krsnich	April 23, 1960	May 19, 1962	Outfielder	Milwaukee Braves	
Rocky Krsnich	September 13, 1949	September 26, 1953	Third baseman	Chicago White Sox	
Bill Krueger	April 10, 1983	August 13, 1995	Pitcher	Oakland Athletics, Los Angeles Dodgers, Milwaukee Brewers, Seattle Mariners, Minnesota Twins, Montreal Expos, Detroit Tigers, San Diego Padres	
Ernie Krueger	August 4, 1913	October 4, 1925	Catcher	Cleveland Indians, New York Yankees, New York Giants, Brooklyn Robins, Cincinnati Reds	
Otto Krueger	September 16, 1899	September 22, 1905	Utility infielder	Cleveland Spiders, St. Louis Cardinals, Pittsburgh Pirates, Philadelphia Phillies	
Chris Krug	May 30, 1965	May 13, 1969	Catcher	Chicago Cubs, San Diego Padres	
Gene Krug	April 29, 1981	May 14, 1981	Pinch hitter	Chicago Cubs	
Henry Krug	July 26, 1902	September 30, 1902	Utility player	Philadelphia Phillies	
Marty Krug	May 29, 1912	September 27, 1922	Third baseman	Boston Red Sox, Chicago Cubs	
Abe Kruger	October 6, 1908	October 7, 1908	Pitcher	Brooklyn Superbas	
Art Kruger	April 11, 1907	September 26, 1915	Outfielder	Cincinnati Reds, Cleveland Naps, Boston Doves, Kansas City Packers	
John Kruk	April 7, 1986	July 30, 1995	First baseman	San Diego Padres, Philadelphia Phillies, Chicago White Sox	
Mike Krukow	September 6, 1976	June 4, 1989	Pitcher	Chicago Cubs, Philadelphia Phillies, San Francisco Giants	
Al Krumm	May 17, 1889	May 17, 1889	Pitcher	Pittsburgh Pirates	
Dick Kryhoski	April 19, 1949	June 10, 1955	First baseman	New York Yankees, Detroit Tigers, St. Louis Browns/Baltimore Orioles, Kansas City Athletics	
Dave Krynzel	September 1, 2004	June 10, 2005	Outfielder	Milwaukee Brewers	
Tony Kubek	April 20, 1957	October 3, 1965	Shortstop	New York Yankees	
Jason Kubel	August 31, 2004		Outfielder	Minnesota Twins	
Jeff Kubenka	September 6, 1998	August 8, 1999	Pitcher	Los Angeles Dodgers	
Ted Kubiak	April 14, 1967	September 28, 1976	Second baseman	Kansas City/Oakland Athletics, Milwaukee Brewers, St. Louis Cardinals, Texas Rangers, San Diego Padres	
Tim Kubinski	July 16, 1997	October 2, 1999	Pitcher	Oakland Athletics	
Jack Kubiszyn	April 23, 1961	September 30, 1962	Shortstop	Cleveland Indians	
Gil Kubski	September 2, 1980	October 5, 1980	Outfielder	California Angels	
Johnny Kucab	September 14, 1950	September 1, 1952	Pitcher	Philadelphia Athletics	
Jack Kucek	August 8, 1974	October 1, 1980	Pitcher	Chicago White Sox, Philadelphia Phillies, Toronto Blue Jays	
Johnny Kucks	April 17, 1955	September 25, 1960	Pitcher	New York Yankees, Kansas City Athletics	
Steve Kuczek	September 29, 1949	September 29, 1949	Pinch hitter	Boston Braves	
Bert Kuczynski	June 2, 1943	July 4, 1943	Pitcher	Philadelphia Athletics	
Bill Kuehne	May 1, 1883	September 29, 1892	Third baseman	Columbus Buckeyes (AA), Pittsburgh Alleghenys, Pittsburgh Burghers, Columbus Solons, Louisville Colonels, St. Louis Browns (NL), Cincinnati Reds	
Harvey Kuenn	September 6, 1952	October 2, 1966	Utility player	Detroit Tigers, Cleveland Indians, San Francisco Giants, Chicago Cubs, Philadelphia Phillies	
Fred Kuhaulua	August 2, 1977	October 1, 1981	Pitcher	California Angels, San Diego Padres	
Joe Kuhel	July 31, 1930	May 11, 1947	First baseman	Washington Senators, Chicago White Sox	
Bub Kuhn	September 1, 1924	September 1, 1924	Pitcher	Cleveland Indians	
Kenny Kuhn	July 7, 1955	September 29, 1957	Shortstop	Cleveland Indians	
Walt Kuhn	April 18, 1912	September 28, 1914	Catcher	Chicago White Sox	
Charlie Kuhns	June 4, 1897	October 14, 1899	Utility infielder	Pittsburgh Pirates, Boston Braves	
Duane Kuiper	September 9, 1974	June 27, 1985	Second baseman	Cleveland Indians, San Francisco Giants	
John Kull	October 2, 1909	October 2, 1909	Pitcher	Philadelphia Athletics	
Mike Kume	August 26, 1955	September 25, 1955	Pitcher	Kansas City Athletics	
Bill Kunkel	April 15, 1961	September 21, 1963	Pitcher	Kansas City Athletics, New York Yankees	
Jeff Kunkel	July 23, 1984	September 14, 1992	Shortstop	Texas Rangers, Chicago Cubs	
Rusty Kuntz	September 1, 1979	April 24, 1985	Outfielder	Chicago White Sox, Minnesota Twins, Detroit Tigers	
Earl Kunz	April 19, 1923	July 30, 1923	Pitcher	Pittsburgh Pirates	
Eddie Kunz	August 3, 2008	August 16, 2008	Pitcher	New York Mets	
Hong-Chih Kuo	September 2, 2005		Pitcher	Los Angeles Dodgers	
Hiroki Kuroda	April 4, 2008		Pitcher	Los Angeles Dodgers	
Ryan Kurosaki	May 20, 1975	June 16, 1975	Pitcher	St. Louis Cardinals	
Whitey Kurowski	September 23, 1941	October 1, 1949	Third baseman	St. Louis Cardinals	
Hal Kurtz	April 18, 1968	August 12, 1968	Pitcher	Cleveland Indians	
Ed Kusel	September 18, 1909	October 1, 1909	Pitcher	St. Louis Browns	
Emil Kush	September 21, 1941	August 3, 1949	Pitcher	Chicago Cubs	
Craig Kusick	September 8, 1973	September 30, 1979	First baseman	Minnesota Twins, Toronto Blue Jays	
Art Kusnyer	September 21, 1970	October 1, 1978	Catcher	Chicago White Sox, California Angels, Milwaukee Brewers, Kansas City Royals	
Jul Kustus	April 17, 1909	July 10, 1909	Outfielder	Brooklyn Superbas	
Randy Kutcher	June 19, 1986	September 27, 1990	Outfielder	San Francisco Giants, Boston Red Sox	
Joe Kutina	September 6, 1911	September 13, 1912	First baseman	St. Louis Browns	
Marty Kutyna	September 19, 1959	September 22, 1962	Pitcher	Kansas City Athletics, Washington Senators (1961–71)	
Jerry Kutzler	April 28, 1990	May 31, 1990	Pitcher	Chicago White Sox	
Masumi Kuwata	June 10, 2007	August 13, 2007	Pitcher	Pittsburgh Pirates	
Bob Kuzava	September 21, 1946	September 29, 1957	Pitcher	Cleveland Indians, Chicago White Sox, Washington Senators, New York Yankees, Baltimore Orioles, Philadelphia Phillies, Pittsburgh Pirates, St. Louis Cardinals	
Al Kvasnak	April 15, 1942	May 3, 1942	Outfielder	Washington Senators	
Andy Kyle	September 7, 1912	October 6, 1912	Outfielder	Cincinnati Reds	
