= Goolsby =

Goolsby is a surname. Notable people with the surname include:

- Mike Goolsby (born 1982), American football player
- Ray Goolsby (1919–1999), baseball player
- Tony Goolsby (born 1933), a businessman and former member of the Texas House of Representatives
- Katherine Goolsby (born 1981), American speech-language pathologist and expert on beagles.
- Denzel Goolsby (born 1997), a former D1 defensive back for the Kansas State wildcats.

== Fictional characters ==
- Dustin Goolsby, a character on the American television program Glee
