= Jake Early =

American baseball player (1915-1985)

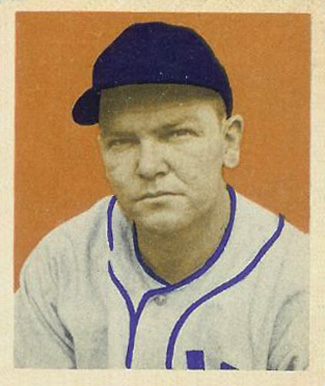
- Catcher
- Born: May 19, 1915; Kings Mountain, North Carolina, U.S.
- Died: May 31, 1985 (aged 70); Melbourne, Florida, U.S.
- Batted: Left Threw: Right

MLB debut
- May 4, 1939, for the Washington Senators

Last MLB appearance
- September 30, 1949, for the Washington Senators

MLB statistics
- Batting average: .241
- Home runs: 32
- Runs batted in: 264
- Stats at Baseball Reference

Teams
- Washington Senators (1939–1943, 1946); St. Louis Browns (1947); Washington Senators (1948–1949)

Career highlights and awards
- All-Star (1943)

Jacob Willard Early (May 19, 1915 – May 31, 1985) was an American professional baseball player. He played in Major League Baseball as a catcher for the Washington Senators and the St. Louis Browns. Early was a left-hand-hitting batter and was known for his skill at catching the knuckleball.

== Baseball career ==
Born in Kings Mountain, North Carolina, Early began his professional baseball career in 1936 at the age of 21 with the Jacksonville Tars of the South Atlantic League. By 1938, he had moved up to the Charlotte Hornetts of the Piedmont League where he posted a .316 batting average in 97 games. Early made his major league debut with the Washington Senators on May 4, 1939 at the age of 24. He served as a reserve catcher, backing up future Baseball Hall of Fame member, Rick Ferrell. Former catcher and Senators coach Benny Bengough helped Early develop his catching skills.

The Senators traded Ferrell to the St. Louis Browns in May 1941, leaving Early to share catching duties with Al Evans. Early out-hit Evans and ended the season having caught the majority of the team's games with a career-high batting average of .284 along with 54 runs batted in and a team-high 10 home runs. His hitting performance earned him the starting catcher's job in 1942. Although his batting average dropped to .204, he led American League catchers in assists and in baserunners caught stealing, and finished second in putouts. Early developed a reputation as a talkative player on the field, using several methods to distract the hitter. These methods of distraction included his imitation of a radio announcer's play-by-play commentary, an auctioneer's sales pitch and even singing.

By 1943, Early was being recognized as one of the best defensive catchers in baseball. He had the arduous task of catching for a Senators' starting pitching staff that included four knuckleball pitchers. Dutch Leonard, Johnny Niggeling, Roger Wolff and Mickey Haefner all threw the notoriously difficult to catch knuckleball. Further recognition came when he was selected to be the starting catcher for the American League in the 1943 All-Star Game. The difficulty in catching the knuckleball was evident as Early led the league in passed balls allowed.

In December 1943, Early was called into military service and was inducted into the United States Army. He was assigned to an artillery unit attached to the 87th Infantry Division and fought in the Battle of the Bulge. He lost two years of his baseball career while he served in the Army.

After being discharged from military service, Early returned to play for the Senators in 1946 but, his two years absence from the game showed as he only managed to post a .201 average while sharing catching duties with Evans. In December, the Senators traded Early to the St. Louis Browns for Frank Mancuso. In 1947, he platooned alongside catcher Les Moss, hitting for a .224 average along with a career-high on-base percentage of .381 in 87 games. Early was traded back to the Senators in March 1948 where, he once again shared catching duties with Evans. He led the league in baserunners caught stealing and in caught stealing percentage, throwing out an impressive 63.8% of baserunners who attempted to steal a base, the eighth highest single-season percentage in baseball history. In 1949, he split his playing time between the minor league Chattanooga Lookouts and the Washington Senators. After being released by the Senators in February 1950, he played five more seasons in minor league baseball, including four seasons with the Minneapolis Millers before retiring in 1954 at the age of 39.

== Career statistics ==
In a nine-year major league career, Early played in 747 games, accumulating 532 hits in 2,208 at bats for a .241 career batting average along with 32 home runs, 264 runs batted in and an on-base percentage of .330. He ended his career with a .976 fielding percentage. Early led American League catchers twice in baserunners caught stealing, once in caught stealing percentage and once in assists. His 48.79% career caught stealing percentage ranks 27th all-time among major league catchers.

== Later life ==
Early went on to become a player-manager in the minor leagues, leading the Rock Hill Chiefs in 1954 and then managed the Statesville Owls in 1960. He retired from baseball in 1963 and returned to Kings Mountain where he worked as a police officer and recreation director. He retired to Florida in 1970 and died in Melbourne on May 31, 1985, at the age of 70.
