= Hardin Cathey =

American baseball player (1919-1997)

- Pitcher
- Born: July 6, 1919; Burns, Tennessee, U.S.
- Died: July 27, 1997 (aged 78); Nashville, Tennessee, U.S.
- Batted: Right Threw: Right

MLB debut
- April 16, 1942, for the Washington Senators

Last MLB appearance
- June 11, 1942, for the Washington Senators

MLB statistics
- Win–loss record: 1–1
- Earned run average: 7.42
- Strikeouts: 8
- Stats at Baseball Reference

Teams
- Washington Senators (1942)

Hardin Abner Cathey (July 6, 1919 – July 26, 1997), nicknamed "Lil Abner", was an American Major League Baseball pitcher who played for the Washington Senators in 1942.
