= Jim Boyer (umpire) =

American baseball umpire (1909-1959)

- Born: James Murray Boyer; April 21, 1909; Templeville, Maryland, U.S.
- Died: July 25, 1959 (aged 50); Finksburg, Maryland, U.S.
- Occupation: Umpire
- Years active: 1944–1950
- Employer: American League

James Murray Boyer (April 21, 1909 – July 25, 1959) was an American Major League Baseball umpire who worked in the American League from 1944 to 1950. Boyer umpired in the 1947 World Series and the 1947 Major League Baseball All-Star Game. In his career, he umpired 1,025 Major League games.
