= Bob Repass =

American baseball player (1917–2006)

- Infielder
- Born: November 6, 1917; West Pittston, Pennsylvania, U.S.
- Died: January 17, 2006 (aged 88); Wethersfield, Connecticut, U.S.
- Batted: Right Threw: Right

MLB debut
- September 18, 1939, for the St. Louis Cardinals

Last MLB appearance
- August 10, 1942, for the Washington Senators

MLB statistics
- Batting average: .242
- Home runs: 2
- Runs batted in: 24
- Stats at Baseball Reference

Teams
- St. Louis Cardinals (1939); Washington Senators (1942)

Robert Willis Repass (November 6, 1917 – January 17, 2006) was an American Major League Baseball infielder. He played for the St. Louis Cardinals in 1939 and the Washington Senators in 1942.
