= Phil McCullough =

American baseball player (1917–2003)

- Pitcher
- Born: July 22, 1917; Stockbridge, Georgia
- Died: January 16, 2003 (aged 85); Decatur, Georgia
- Batted: Right Threw: Right

MLB debut
- April 22, 1942, for the Washington Senators

Last MLB appearance
- April 22, 1942, for the Washington Senators

MLB statistics
- Win–loss record: 0–0
- Strikeouts: 2
- Earned run average: 6.00
- Stats at Baseball Reference

Teams
- Washington Senators (1942)

Pinson Lamar "Phil" McCullough (July 22, 1917 – January 16, 2003) was an American professional baseball pitcher. He appeared in one game in Major League Baseball for the Washington Senators during the 1942 season.
