= Spec Shea =

American baseball player (1920–2002)

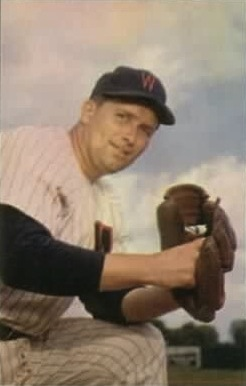
- Shea, circa 1953
- Pitcher
- Born: October 2, 1920; Naugatuck, Connecticut, U.S.
- Died: July 19, 2002 (aged 81); New Haven, Connecticut, U.S.
- Batted: Right Threw: Right

MLB debut
- April 19, 1947, for the New York Yankees

Last MLB appearance
- August 27, 1955, for the Washington Senators

MLB statistics
- Win–loss record: 56–46
- Earned run average: 3.80
- Strikeouts: 361
- Stats at Baseball Reference

Teams
- New York Yankees (1947–1949, 1951); Washington Senators (1952–1955)

Career highlights and awards
- All-Star (1947); World Series champion (1947)

Francis Joseph "Spec" Shea (October 2, 1920 – July 19, 2002) was an American professional baseball pitcher who played in Major League Baseball from 1947 to 1955. He played for the New York Yankees from 1947 to 1951 and the Washington Senators from 1952 to 1955. He was known as "The Naugatuck Nugget" as a result of being from Naugatuck, Connecticut, and was named as such by Yankees broadcaster Mel Allen, and was nicknamed "Spec" because of his freckles.

== Career ==
Shea originally signed with the Yankees as an amateur free agent in 1940. He spent the 1940 season playing in Amsterdam, winning 11 and losing four while pitching 137 innings. In 1941, he was promoted to Norfolk, where he struck out 154 in 199 innings, and in 1942 he played in Kansas City, where he improved upon his earned run average. He was a member of the United States Armed Forces, serving in World War II. He joined in 1943 and served for three years, where he served solely as a soldier and did not play baseball.

He was promoted to the Yankees' major league roster at the start of the 1947 New York Yankees season, and made his debut on April 19, 1947. His debut against the Boston Red Sox was so strongly anticipated at Naugatuck High School, his alma mater, that the school suspended operations for the day so the student body could travel to New York to root for Spec. As a rookie, Shea played in his first and only All-Star Game, playing in the 1947 Major League Baseball All-Star Game. In the game, Shea pitched the 4th, 5th, and 6th innings, relieving for Hal Newhouser. He allowed one earned run, and was declared the winning pitcher of the All-Star Game.

The same year, MLB established the Rookie of the Year Award. In the middle of the season, however, Shea was sidelined for seven weeks due to a pulled neck muscle. Shea finished the season with a 14–5 record in 27 appearances, had the lowest hits allowed per nine innings pitched in the majors with 6.4, had the best win–loss record in the American League with a .737 winnning percentage, threw 13 complete games, three shutouts, and had an ERA of 3.07. Shea was in the running for the Major League Baseball Rookie of the Year Award, which went to Jackie Robinson. Shea finished third in voting behind Robinson and Larry Jansen, but would have won the award had the American and National Leagues had separate Rookie of the Year winners. In the 1947 World Series, Shea started games one, five and seven, winning the first two en route to the Yankees' World Series victory.

From 1948 to 1951, however, Shea had a combined 15–16 record, continuing to pitch in pain due to a nagging neck injury suffered in 1947. Instead of it being arm trouble as the Yankees believed, it was an issue that was solved by Shea visiting a chiropractor during the winter before the 1951 New York Yankees season. On May 3, 1952, Shea was traded by the Yankees with Jackie Jensen, Jerry Snyder, and Archie Wilson to the Washington Senators for Irv Noren and Tom Upton. In 1952 he had an 11–7 record with a 2.93 ERA, and in 1953 he had a 12–7 record with a 3.94 ERA. He was used in his final two seasons primarily as a relief pitcher, and pitched his final major league game on August 27, 1955.

As a hitter, Shea posted a .195 batting average (58-for-298) with 29 runs, 1 home run, 33 RBI and 19 bases on balls in 195 games. Defensively, he recorded a .967 fielding percentage.

== Later life ==
Robert Redford called Shea during production of the film The Natural for pitching consultation, where he taught Redford how to pitch in an old-time style. Shea died in New Haven, Connecticut, on July 19, 2002, at the age of 81 after having heart valve replacement surgery.
