= 1947 Major League Baseball All-Star Game =

1947 American baseball competition

	1	2	3	4	5	6	7	8	9	R	H	E
American League	0	0	0	0	0	1	1	0	0	2	8	0
National League	0	0	0	1	0	0	0	0	0	1	5	1
- Date: July 8, 1947
- Venue: Wrigley Field
- City: Chicago, Illinois
- Managers: Joe Cronin (BOS); Eddie Dyer (STL)
- Attendance: 41,123
- Ceremonial first pitch: Commissioner Happy Chandler
- Radio: Mutual
- Radio announcers: Mel Allen and Jim Britt

The 1947 Major League Baseball All-Star Game was the 14th playing of the "Midsummer Classic" between Major League Baseball's (MLB) American League (AL) and National League (NL) All-Star teams. The All-Star Game was held on July 8, 1947, at Wrigley Field in Chicago, the home of the NL's Chicago Cubs.

The game resulted in the American League defeating the National League by a score of 2–1 in 2 hours and 19 minutes.

== All-Star managers and coaches ==
The National League manager was Eddie Dyer of the St. Louis Cardinals, and the NL coaches were Philadelphia Phillies manager Ben Chapman and New York Giants player-manager Mel Ott.

The American League manager was Joe Cronin of the Boston Red Sox, and the AL coaches were Red Sox coach Del Baker and Detroit Tigers manager Steve O'Neill.

== All-Star team rosters ==
The starting pitchers were selected by the respective American and National League managers. The eight position starters were chosen by the fans. Players in italics have since been inducted into the National Baseball Hall of Fame.

=== American League ===
Fan-elected starters
Position	Player	Team	All-Star Games
C	Buddy Rosar	Athletics	4
1B	George McQuinn	Yankees	5
2B	Joe Gordon	Indians	7
3B	George Kell	Tigers	1
SS	Lou Boudreau	Indians	6
OF	Ted Williams	Red Sox	5
OF	Joe DiMaggio	Yankees	9
OF	Buddy Lewis	Senators	2
Manager-elected starter
P	Hal Newhouser	Tigers	5

==== Reserves ====
Pitchers
Position	Player	Team	All-Star Games
P	Spud Chandler	Yankees	4
P	Bob Feller#	Indians	6
P	Jack Kramer#	Browns	2
P	Walt Masterson	Senators	1
P	Joe Page	Yankees	2
P	Spec Shea	Yankees	1
P	Dizzy Trout#	Tigers	2
P	Early Wynn^{[A]}#	Senators	1

Position players
Position	Player	Team	All-Star Games
C	Jim Hegan#	Indians	1
C	Aaron Robinson#	Yankees	1
1B	Rudy York#	Red Sox	7
2B	Bobby Doerr	Red Sox	6
3B	Billy Johnson	Yankees	1
SS	Luke Appling	White Sox	7
OF	Tommy Henrich^{[B]}	Yankees	2
OF	Charlie Keller#	Yankees	5
OF	Pat Mullin#	Tigers	1
OF	Stan Spence	Senators	4

=== National League ===
Fan-elected starters
Position	Player	Team	All-Star Games
C	Walker Cooper	Giants	5
1B	Johnny Mize	Giants	7
2B	Emil Verban	Phillies	2
3B	Bob Elliott*	Braves	4
SS	Eddie Miller*	Reds	7
OF	Enos Slaughter	Cardinals	4
OF	Harry Walker	Phillies	2
OF	Dixie Walker	Dodgers	4
Manager-elected starter
P	Ewell Blackwell	Reds	2

==== Reserves ====
Pitchers
Position	Player	Team	All-Star Games
P	Ralph Branca#	Dodgers	1
P	Harry Brecheen	Cardinals	1
P	Red Munger#	Cardinals	2
P	Schoolboy Rowe	Phillies	3
P	Johnny Sain	Braves	1
P	Warren Spahn	Braves	1

Position players
Position	Player	Team	All-Star Games
C	Bruce Edwards	Dodgers	1
C	Phil Masi	Braves	2
1B	Stan Musial	Cardinals	4
2B	Eddie Stanky	Dodgers	1
3B	Frankie Gustine	Pirates	2
3B	Whitey Kurowski^{[C]}	Cardinals	4
SS	Marty Marion	Cardinals	4
SS	Pee Wee Reese^{[D]}	Dodgers	3
OF	Phil Cavarretta	Cubs	3
OF	Bert Haas	Reds	1
OF	Willard Marshall	Giants	2
OF	Andy Pafko	Cubs	1

1. Early Wynn replaced Bob Feller on the roster due to injury.
2. Tommy Henrich replaced Charlie Keller on the roster due to injury.
3. Whitey Kurowski replaced Bob Elliott on the roster due to injury. Frankie Gustine replaced Elliott as starter at third base.
4. Pee Wee Reese replaced Eddie Miller on the roster due to injury. Marty Marion replaced Miller as starter at shortstop.

* This player did not start.
# This player did not play.

== All-Star Game ==
=== Ceremonies ===
The ceremonial first pitch was thrown by Happy Chandler, Commissioner of Baseball.

=== Starting lineups ===
American League				National League			
Order	Player	Team	Position	Order	Player	Team	Position
1	George Kell	Tigers	3B	1	Harry Walker	Phillies	CF
2	Buddy Lewis	Senators	RF	2	Dixie Walker	Dodgers	RF
3	Ted Williams	Red Sox	LF	3	Walker Cooper	Giants	C
4	Joe DiMaggio	Yankees	CF	4	Johnny Mize	Giants	1B
5	Lou Boudreau	Indians	SS	5	Enos Slaughter	Cardinals	LF
6	George McQuinn	Yankees	1B	6	Frankie Gustine	Pirates	3B
7	Joe Gordon	Indians	2B	7	Marty Marion	Cardinals	SS
8	Buddy Rosar	Athletics	C	8	Emil Verban	Dodgers	2B
9	Hal Newhouser	Tigers	P	9	Ewell Blackwell	Reds	P

=== Umpires ===
Position	Umpire	League
Home Plate	Jocko Conlan	National
First Base	Jim Boyer	American
Second Base	Butch Henline	National
Third Base	Art Passarella	American

The umpires changed assignments in the middle of the fifth inning – Conlan and Passarella swapped positions, also Boyer and Henline swapped positions.

=== Game summary ===
Tuesday, July 8, 1947 1:30 pm (CT) at Wrigley Field in Chicago, Illinois
Team	1	2	3	4	5	6	7	8	9	R	H	E
American League	0	0	0	0	0	1	1	0	0	2	8	0
National League	0	0	0	1	0	0	0	0	0	1	5	1
WP: Spec Shea (1–0) LP: Johnny Sain (0–1) Sv: Joe Page (1); Home runs: AL: None; NL: Johnny Mize (1)

The first three and a half innings were scoreless with four hits between both teams. Johnny Mize hit a home run off of Spec Shea to deep right field in the bottom of the fourth inning to put the National League ahead 1–0. In the top of the sixth, Luke Appling scored from third base as Joe DiMaggio hit into a 6–4–3 double play to again tie the game.

Stan Spence, pinch hitting for Shea, singled to right-center field in the top of the seventh inning, scoring Bobby Doerr from third base to give the American League the lead. Doerr had made it to third after pitcher Johnny Sain failed a pickoff attempt to second baseman Eddie Stanky.

The NL's tying and winning runs in the form of Phil Cavarretta and Phil Masi (pinch running for Johnny Mize) were on third and first bases respectively in the bottom of the eighth inning, with Enos Slaughter at bat. Slaughter grounded out to shortstop Joe Boudreau, and pitcher Joe Page got out of the inning with the AL still on top, 2–1.

Warren Spahn and the National League squad held off any more offense by the AL in the final inning, again giving them a chance to win it in their half of the ninth. Whitey Kurowski grounded out to Bobby Doerr at second and Pee Wee Reese walked to put the tying run on first. Eddie Stanky grounded out to Doerr also, preventing Reese from advancing. Schoolboy Rowe came to bat, pinch hitting for the pitcher Spahn. Rowe flew out to right fielder Tommy Henrich to give the American League a 2–1 victory.

American League

Batter	AB	R	H	RBI	BB	K	AVG
Kell, 3B	4	0	0	0	0	2	.000
Johnson, 3B	0	0	0	0	0	0	.000
Lewis, RF	2	0	0	0	0	0	.000
Appling, PH	1	1	1	0	0	0	1.000
Henrich, RF	1	0	0	0	0	1	.000
Williams, LF	4	0	2	0	0	1	.500
DiMaggio, CF	3	0	1	0	1	0	.333
Boudreau, SS	4	0	1	0	0	1	.250
McQuinn, 1B	4	0	0	0	0	1	.000
Gordon, 2B	2	0	1	0	0	1	.500
Doerr, 2B	2	1	1	0	0	0	.500
Rosar, C	4	0	0	0	0	1	.000
Newhouser, P	1	0	0	0	0	0	.000
Shea, P	1	0	0	0	0	0	.000
Spence, PH	1	0	1	1	0	0	1.000
Masterson, P	0	0	0	0	0	0	.000
Page, P	0	0	0	0	0	0	.000
TOTALS	34	2	8	1	1	8	.235

Batting:
- 2B: Gordon (1, Brecheen), Williams (1, Brecheen).
- TB: Williams 3, Gordon 2, Boudreau, Doerr, Spence, Appling, DiMaggio.
- GIDP: DiMaggio (1).
- RBI: Spence (1).
- 2-out RBI: Spence.
- Team LOB: 6.
- With RISP: 2-for-12.

Baserunning:

- SB: Doerr (1, 2nd off Sain/Edwards).
- Pickoffs: Doerr (2nd by Sain).

Pitcher	IP	H	R	ER	BB	K	HR	ERA	WHIP	BF
Newhouser	3.0	1	0	0	0	2	0	0.00	0.33	10
Shea (W, 1–0)	3.0	3	1	1	2	2	1	3.00	1.67	14
Masterson (H, 1)	1.2	0	0	0	1	2	0	0.00	0.60	6
Page (S, 1)	1.1	1	0	0	1	0	0	0.00	0.75	6
TOTALS	9.0	5	1	1	4	6	1	0.11	1.00	36

National League

Batter	AB	R	H	RBI	BB	K	AVG
H. Walker, CF	2	0	0	0	0	1	.000
Pafko, CF	2	0	1	0	0	0	.500
D. Walker, RF	2	0	0	0	0	0	.000
Marshall, RF	1	0	0	0	1	1	.000
Cooper, C	3	0	0	0	0	1	.000
Edwards, C	0	0	0	0	0	0	.000
Cavarretta, PH/1B	1	0	0	0	0	1	.000
Mize, 1B	3	1	2	1	1	0	.667
Masi, PR/C	0	0	0	0	0	0	.000
Slaughter, LF	3	0	0	0	1	0	.000
Gustine, 3B	2	0	0	0	0	0	.000
Kurowski, 3B	2	0	0	0	0	1	.000
Marion, SS	2	0	1	0	0	0	.500
Reese, SS	1	0	0	0	1	1	.000
Verban, 2B	2	0	0	0	0	0	.000
Stanky, 2B	2	0	0	0	0	0	.000
Blackwell, P	0	0	0	0	0	0	.000
Haas, PH	1	0	1	0	0	0	1.000
Brecheen, P	1	0	0	0	0	0	.000
Sain, P	0	0	0	0	0	0	.000
Musial, PH	1	0	0	0	0	0	.000
Spahn, P	1	0	0	0	0	0	.000
Rowe, PH	1	0	0	0	0	0	.000
TOTALS	32	1	5	1	4	6	.156

Batting:
- HR: Mize (1, Shea; 4th inning, 0 on, 2 outs).
- TB: Mize 5, Pafko, Marion, Haas.
- RBI: Mize (1).
- 2-out RBI: Mize.
- Team LOB: 8.
- Team RISP: 0-for-2.

Fielding:

- E: Sain (1).
- DP: 1 (Reese-Stanky-Mize).
- PB: Cooper (1).

Pitcher	IP	H	R	ER	BB	K	HR	ERA	WHIP	BF
Blackwell	3.0	1	0	0	0	4	0	0.00	0.00	10
Brecheen	3.0	5	1	1	0	2	0	3.00	1.67	13
Sain (L, 0–1)	1.0	2	1	1	0	1	0	9.00	2.00	5
Spahn	2.0	0	0	0	1	1	0	0.00	0.50	7
TOTALS	9.0	8	2	2	1	8	0	0.22	1.00	35

- WP: Blackwell (1).
- Pickoffs: Sain (0; Doerr, 2nd).
- Umpires: HP – Jocko Conlan, 1B – Jim Boyer, 2B – Butch Henline, 3B – Art Passarella.
- Time : 2:19.
- Attendance: 41,123.
