= Steve Basil =

American baseball umpire (born 1893-1962)

- Born: Stephen John Basil; April 2, 1893; Austin, Texas, U.S.
- Died: June 24, 1962 (aged 69); Gilchrist, Texas, U.S.
- Occupation: Umpire
- Years active: 1936-1942
- Employer: American League

Stephen John Basil (April 2, 1893 – June 24, 1962) was an American Major League Baseball umpire who worked in the American League from 1936 to 1942. Basil umpired in two World Series (1937 and 1940) and in two All-Star Games (1938 and 1940). In his career, he umpired 1,037 Major League games.
