= Bert Haas =

American baseball player (1914–1999)

- First baseman / Third baseman
- Born: February 8, 1914; Naperville, Illinois, U.S.
- Died: June 23, 1999 (aged 85); Tampa, Florida, U.S.
- Batted: Right Threw: Right

MLB debut
- September 9, 1937, for the Brooklyn Dodgers

Last MLB appearance
- August 26, 1951, for the Chicago White Sox

MLB statistics
- Batting average: .264
- Home runs: 22
- Runs batted in: 263
- Stats at Baseball Reference

Teams
- Brooklyn Dodgers (1937–1938); Cincinnati Reds (1942–1943, 1946–1947); Philadelphia Phillies (1948–1949); New York Giants (1949); Chicago White Sox (1951)

Career highlights and awards
- All-Star (1947)

Berthold John Haas (February 8, 1914 – June 23, 1999) was an American professional baseball player who played first base in the Major Leagues from 1933 to 1951. He played for the Cincinnati Reds, New York Giants, Brooklyn Dodgers, Chicago White Sox, and Philadelphia Phillies. In 1947, Haas was selected as a National League all-star.

In 721 games over nine seasons, Haas posted a .264 batting average (644-for-2440) with 263 runs, 22 home runs, 263 RBI, 51 stolen bases and 204 bases on balls.

At the end of his career he managed in the minor leagues from 1955–1958 and 1962 and in the Mexican League in 1961.
