= 1938 Major League Baseball All-Star Game =

1938 American baseball competition

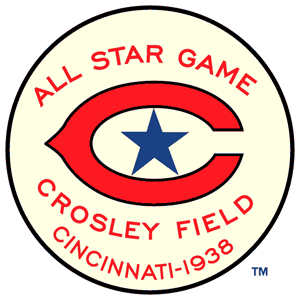
	1	2	3	4	5	6	7	8	9	R	H	E
American League	0	0	0	0	0	0	0	0	1	1	7	4
National League	1	0	0	1	0	0	2	0	X	4	8	0
- Date: July 6, 1938
- Venue: Crosley Field
- City: Cincinnati, Ohio
- Managers: Joe McCarthy (NYY); Bill Terry (NYG)
- Attendance: 27,067
- Ceremonial first pitch: None
- Radio: CBS; NBC; Mutual
- Radio announcers: Bill Dyer and France Laux (CBS); Tom Manning and Red Barber (NBC); Bob Elson and Dick Bray (Mutual)

The 1938 Major League Baseball All-Star Game was the sixth playing of the mid-summer classic between the all-stars of the American League (AL) and National League (NL), the two leagues comprising Major League Baseball. The game was held on July 6, 1938, at Crosley Field in Cincinnati, Ohio, the home of the Cincinnati Reds of the National League. The game resulted in the National League defeating the American League 4–1.

== Rosters ==
Players in italics have since been inducted into the National Baseball Hall of Fame.

=== American League ===
Starters
Position	Player	Team	All-Star Games
P	Lefty Gomez	Yankees	6
C	Bill Dickey	Yankees	5
1B	Jimmie Foxx	Red Sox	6
2B	Charlie Gehringer	Tigers	6
3B	Buddy Lewis	Senators	1
SS	Joe Cronin	Red Sox	5
LF	Mike Kreevich	White Sox	1
CF	Earl Averill	Indians	6
RF	Joe DiMaggio	Yankees	3

Pitchers
Position	Player	Team	All-Star Games
P	Johnny Allen	Indians	1
P	Bob Feller	Indians	1
P	Lefty Grove	Red Sox	5
P	Vern Kennedy	Tigers	2
P	Johnny Murphy	Yankees	2
P	Bobo Newsom	Browns	1
P	Red Ruffing	Yankees	2

Reserves
Position	Player	Team	All-Star Games
C	Rick Ferrell	Senators	6
C	Rudy York	Tigers	1
1B	Lou Gehrig	Yankees	6
1B	Hank Greenberg	Tigers	2
3B	Red Rolfe	Yankees	2
SS	Cecil Travis	Senators	1
OF	Doc Cramer	Red Sox	3
OF	Bob Johnson	Athletics	2

=== National League ===
Starters
Position	Player	Team	All-Star Games
P	Johnny Vander Meer	Reds	1
C	Ernie Lombardi	Reds	3
1B	Frank McCormick	Reds	1
2B	Billy Herman	Cubs	5
3B	Stan Hack	Cubs	1
SS	Leo Durocher	Dodgers	2
LF	Joe Medwick	Cardinals	5
CF	Mel Ott	Giants	5
RF	Ival Goodman	Reds	1

Pitchers
Position	Player	Team	All-Star Games
P	Mace Brown	Pirates	1
P	Paul Derringer	Reds	2
P	Carl Hubbell	Giants	6
P	Bill Lee	Cubs	1
P	Jim Turner	Bees	1

Reserves
Position	Player	Team	All-Star Games
C	Harry Danning	Giants	1
C	Gabby Hartnett	Cubs	6
C	Babe Phelps	Dodgers	1
2B	Tony Cuccinello	Bees	2
3B	Cookie Lavagetto	Dodgers	1
SS	Arky Vaughan	Pirates	5
OF	Hank Leiber	Giants	1
OF	Hersh Martin	Phillies	1
OF	Jo-Jo Moore	Giants	5
OF	Lloyd Waner	Pirates	1

== Game ==
=== Umpires ===
Position	Umpire	League
Home Plate	Bill Klem	National
First Base	Harry Geisel	American
Second Base	Lee Ballanfant	National
Third Base	Steve Basil	American

=== Starting lineups ===
American League				National League			
Order	Player	Team	Position	Order	Player	Team	Position
1	Mike Kreevich	White Sox	LF	1	Stan Hack	Cubs	3B
2	Charlie Gehringer	Tigers	2B	2	Billy Herman	Cubs	2B
3	Earl Averill	Indians	CF	3	Ival Goodman	Reds	RF
4	Jimmie Foxx	Red Sox	1B	4	Joe Medwick	Cardinals	LF
5	Joe DiMaggio	Yankees	RF	5	Mel Ott	Giants	CF
6	Bill Dickey	Yankees	C	6	Ernie Lombardi	Reds	C
7	Joe Cronin	Red Sox	SS	7	Frank McCormick	Reds	1B
8	Buddy Lewis	Senators	3B	8	Leo Durocher	Dodgers	SS
9	Lefty Gomez	Yankees	P	9	Johnny Vander Meer	Reds	P

=== Game summary ===
Wednesday, July 6, 1938 1:30 pm (ET) at Crosley Field in Cincinnati, Ohio
Team	1	2	3	4	5	6	7	8	9	R	H	E
American League	0	0	0	0	0	0	0	0	1	1	7	4
National League	1	0	0	1	0	0	2	0	-	4	8	0
WP: Johnny Vander Meer (1–0) LP: Lefty Gomez (0–1) Sv: Mace Brown (1)
