= Buddy Lewis =

American baseball player (1916-2011)

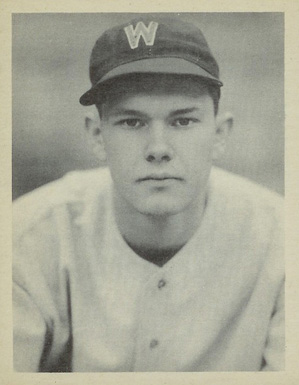
- Third baseman / Right fielder
- Born: August 10, 1916; Gastonia, North Carolina, U.S.
- Died: February 18, 2011 (aged 94); Gastonia, North Carolina, U.S.
- Batted: Left Threw: Right

MLB debut
- September 16, 1935, for the Washington Senators

Last MLB appearance
- September 30, 1949, for the Washington Senators

MLB statistics
- Batting average: .297
- Home runs: 71
- Runs batted in: 607
- Stats at Baseball Reference

Teams
- Washington Senators (1935–1941, 1945–1947, 1949)

Career highlights and awards
- 2× All-Star (1938, 1947)

John Kelly Lewis (August 10, 1916 – February 18, 2011), better known as Buddy Lewis, was a third baseman/right fielder in Major League Baseball who played his entire career with the Washington Senators (1935–41, 1945–47, 1949). Lewis was born in Gastonia, North Carolina.

== Career ==
Lewis started playing baseball around the age of 12, when he played baseball for the Junior American Legion. He batted left-handed and threw right-handed. In 1934, Lewis was a star third baseman of a team for Post 23 that went to the Legion's version of the World Series. Recognized for his efforts, he was offered a tryout with the New York Giants, but manager Bill Terry decided against keeping Lewis on the team. A recommendation by a Legion World Series viewer led him to Joe Engel, who owned the Class A Chattanooga Lookouts, the Washington Senators' farm club at the time. Lewis started at third base late in the 1934 season, going 7-for-21 in 10 games. The following year, he went .303 with 40 doubles. He was called up by the Senators in September. Lewis began his major league career on September 16, 1935 by pinch hitting for pitcher Bump Hadley in the bottom of the 5th inning, where in his one batting appearance against Sad Sam Jones, he popped out before being replaced by Jack Russell. In eight games, he batted .107 with three hits in 28 at-bats, striking out five times.

For 1936, Lewis won the third baseman position, although manager Bucky Harris held him out of the opening series of the season. Afterwards, he proceeded to hit successfully in his first six games. In 143 games, he had 175 hits, 100 runs, 21 doubles, six home runs, 67 RBIs with a .291 batting average, a .347 on-base percentage (OBP) and a .746 OPS, with a near even walk-strikeout ratio of 47-46. In the 139 games he appeared as a third baseman, Lewis logged in 1,214 innings, garnering a .933 fielding percentage with 152 putouts, 297 assists, 32 errors, and 24 double plays. While he led the league in errors, he finished in the top five for the other three defensive categories. The following year, he appeared in 156 games, having 668 at-bats and 210 hits (with both being career highs) along with 107 runs, a league high 162 singles, 32 doubles, ten home runs, 79 RBIs with a .314 batting average, a .367 OBP, a .792 OPS to go with 52 walks and 44 strikeouts. He received votes for Most Valuable Player, finishing 16th. He logged in 1,382 innings at third base, having a .938 fielding percentage while committing 146 putouts, 293 assists, 29 errors, and 32 double plays, all ranking in the top four for the league.

For 1938, Lewis played in 151 games while having 194 hits, 122 runs, 35 doubles, 91 RBIs, 12 home runs, 17 stolen bases (the latter three being career highs), while having a .296 batting average, a .354 OBP, and a .785 OPS. He was named to the All-Star Game that year in Cincinnati. He started the game and batted in the eighth spot in the lineup. He batted once before Lou Gehrig took over. Lewis and Mike Kreevich are the only starters from that game that did not end up inducted into the National Baseball Hall of Fame and Museum. He received votes for the MVP award again, finishing 24th. On fielding, he appeared in 151 games for 1,351 innings, making 161 putouts, 329 assists, 47 errors, and 32 double plays (the latter three being career highs) for a .912 fielding percentage (the lowest full-time percentage for his career).

The following year, he played in 140 games while having 171 hits, 87 runs, 23 doubles, 16 triples (a career and league high), 10 home runs, and 75 RBIs. He batted .319 while having a .879 OPS and 72 walks and 27 strikeouts. He played in 134 games on third base for 1,180 innings, making 122 putouts, 326 assists and 32 errors for a .933 fielding percentage, with the latter three categories rating in the top five for the league.

For 1940, he was moved to right field when Washington acquired Jimmy Pofahl. He played in 148 games while having 190 hits, 101 runs, 38 doubles, six home runs, 63 RBIs, while batting .317 (10th in the league) with a .836 OPS. He stole base 15 times, but he was caught stealing 10 times, a league high. He played 112 games in right field for a total of 978 innings while playing 36 games in third base. In his time at right field, he had 206 putouts, 12 assists (a league high), 9 errors, and one double play turned for a .960 fielding percentage. At third base, he had 42 putouts, 72 assists, six errors, and 11 double plays turned for a .950 fielding percentage.

1941 was the last year of his first tenure with Washington. He played in 149 games while having 169 hits, 97 runs, 29 doubles, nine home runs and 72 RBIs on a .297 batting average with a .820 OPS. He walked a career high 82 times while having just 30 strikeouts. He played 96 games in right field for a total of 836 innings, having 229 putouts, 17 assists (a league high), 7 errors (5th in the league) and three double plays turned for a .972 fielding percentage. He also played 49 games at third base for 433 innings, having 51 putouts, 87 assists, 17 errors and 10 double plays for a .890 fielding percentage. On June 4, 1941, he logged in his 1,000th career hit, singling off St. Louis Browns pitcher Fritz Ostermueller in the top of the 5th inning. In the seven seasons of his first tenure with the Senators, the team never finished above 4th place, having a high of 82-71 in 1936, with their worst mark being a 64-90 record in 1940.

Before his 26th birthday, Lewis had accumulated 1,112 hits, the 10th highest total for a 25-year-old player in MLB history, having more than Orlando Cepeda (1,105), Rogers Hornsby (1,073) and Mickey Mantle (1,080), all of whom were inducted into the Baseball Hall of Fame.

During World War II, Lewis served in the United States Army Air Forces as a transport pilot. He flew more than 500 missions in the China Burma India Theater and received the Distinguished Flying Cross before returning to the Major Leagues in 1945. Lewis was released by the army on July 20, 1945. One week later, he was back playing baseball with the Senators, playing right field and batting third. He went 0-for-2 with two walks, although he scored a run in the team's 3-1 win over the Boston Red Sox. The Senators that season went on a run to the pennant, losing to the Detroit Tigers by 1.5 games, although they went 87-67. This was the second and final season that Lewis played on a winning team. The following year, he played in 150 games, having 170 hits, 82 runs, 28 doubles, 13 triples (2nd in the league), seven home runs, 45 RBIs and a .292 batting average with a .780 OPS. He played 145 games in the outfield, primarily in right field. In 145 games and 1,291 total innings, he had 304 putouts, 16 assists (a league high for OF), 10 errors (3rd most for OF), five double plays for a .970 fielding percentage. His 15 assists, 247 putouts, and nine errors in right field were all league highs. 1947 was the last year of his second tenure with the Senators. He played in 140 games, having 132 hits, 67 runs, 15 doubles, 48 RBIs with a .261 batting average and a .672 OPS. He played 130 games in right field for 1,129 innings, having 259 putouts, 11 assists, nine errors, and two double plays on a .968 fielding percentage. His 246 putouts, 10 errors and nine errors in right field all ranked 1st in the league. He was named to the All-Star Game that year as the starting right fielder, batting in the number 2 spot. He went 0-for-2 before being pinch hit for Luke Appling.

He returned to the team in 1949 with a $16,000 contract. He batted third as the starting right fielder on Opening Day for the Senators, with Lewis going 0-for-3 with a HBP, a walk and a RBI on a sacrifice fly as Washington beat the Philadelphia Athletics 3-2. However, he was marred by a leg injury in May, resorting to pinch hitting for some part of the season, with occasional play on the field. He played in 95 games while having 63 hits, 25 runs, 14 doubles, three home runs and 28 RBIs on a .245 batting average with a .355 OBP and .721 OPS, highlighted with 41 walks. He played in 67 games in right field, logging in 545 innings with a .979 fielding percentage, making 136 total putouts with four assists and three errors with one double play turned. His last game on September 30 (the antepenultimate game of the season) was as a pinch hitter for Lloyd Hittle in the bottom of the ninth inning. Facing Ellis Kinder of the Boston Red Sox with one on and one out, Lewis walked. An ensuing walk and ground ball double play ended the game as the Senators lost 11-7. The team would finish 50-104 and last in the American League. After retiring, he took focus on his businesses such as a bowling alley and a Ford dealership, along with being area commissioner for American Legion at one point, sponsor and coach of the Gastonia Post 23 team. He was elected to the North Carolina Sports Hall of Fame and had an American Legion baseball field named after him in Gastonia. Along with Cecil Travis, he was cited by Bill James as a player who lost their shot at the Hall of Fame due to their wartime service.

In an 11-season career, Lewis posted a .297 batting average (1,563-for-5,261) with 71 home runs, 607 RBI, 830 runs, 249 doubles, 93 triples, 83 stolen bases and 573 bases on balls in 1,349 games played. He hit better than .300 three times.

Lewis' nephew is former major league player Hal Morris.

== Death ==
Lewis died on February 18, 2011, at the age of 94, after a long battle with cancer.

== See also ==
- List of Major League Baseball annual triples leaders
- List of Major League Baseball players who spent their entire career with one franchise
