= Ray Hoffman =

American baseball player (1917-2008)

- Third baseman
- Born: June 14, 1917; Detroit, Michigan, U.S.
- Died: May 30, 2008 (aged 90); Milton, Georgia, U.S.
- Batted: Left Threw: Right

MLB debut
- August 30, 1942, for the Washington Senators

Last MLB appearance
- September 6, 1942, for the Washington Senators

MLB statistics
- Batting average: .053
- Hits: 1
- Runs batted in: 2
- Stats at Baseball Reference

Teams
- Washington Senators (1942)

Raymond Lamont Hoffman (June 14, 1917 – May 30, 2008) was a third baseman who played briefly for the Washington Senators during the 1942 season. Listed at 6 ft 0 in (1.83 m), 175 lb., Hoffman batted left-handed and threw right-handed. He was born in Detroit, Michigan.

In his one-season career, Hoffman was a .053 hitter (1–for–19) with two runs and two RBI in seven games. He did not have any extra base hits.

Hoffman died in Milton, Georgia, at the age of 90.

== See also ==
- 1942 Washington Senators season
