= Bob Prichard =

American baseball player (1917-1991)

- First baseman
- Born: October 21, 1917; Paris, Texas, U.S.
- Died: September 25, 1991 (aged 73); Abilene, Texas, U.S.
- Batted: Left Threw: Left

MLB debut
- June 14, 1939, for the Washington Senators

Last MLB appearance
- August 24, 1939, for the Washington Senators

MLB statistics
- Batting average: .235
- Home runs: 0
- Runs batted in: 8
- Stats at Baseball Reference

Teams
- Washington Senators (1939)

Robert Alexander Prichard (October 21, 1917 – September 25, 1991) was an American first baseman in Major League Baseball. He played for the Washington Senators.
