= Alex Kvasnak =

American baseball player (1921-2002)

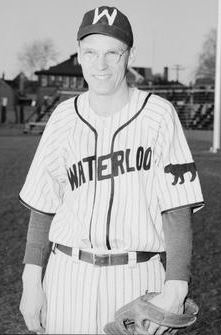
- Outfielder
- Born: January 11, 1921; Sagamore, Pennsylvania, U.S.
- Died: September 26, 2002 (aged 81); Arcadia, California, U.S.
- Batted: Right Threw: Right

MLB debut
- April 15, 1942, for the Washington Senators

Last MLB appearance
- May 3, 1942, for the Washington Senators

MLB statistics
- Games played: 5
- At bats: 11
- Hits: 2
- Stats at Baseball Reference

Teams
- Washington Senators (1942)

Alexander Kvasnak (/wɔːʃnæk/; January 11, 1921 – September 26, 2002) was an American Major League Baseball outfielder who played for the Washington Senators in 1942.

In 1941, Kvasnak hit .340 and led the Appalachian League with 49 stolen bases. His performance was sufficient for the Senators to give him a try in five Major League games in 1942. After recording two singles in those five games, he was demoted to Charlotte. He never played in another Major League game.

In May 1943, Kvasnak was drafted into the United States Army despite his two brothers already being in the service. He was ordered to Camp Meade for induction and served in the European theatre of World War II, including time spent in the Italian campaign. He was wounded three times during the war but managed to return to a minor league baseball career after being discharged.

He played for the Waterloo Tigers of the Intercounty Baseball League in 1950, and led the league in batting average.
