= Ronny Miller =

American baseball player (1918-1998)

- Pitcher
- Born: August 28, 1918; Mason City, Iowa, U.S.
- Died: January 6, 1998 (aged 79); Ferguson, Missouri, U.S.
- Batted: Both Threw: Right

MLB debut
- September 10, 1941, for the Washington Senators

Last MLB appearance
- September 10, 1941, for the Washington Senators

MLB statistics
- Games played: 1
- Innings pitched: 2
- Earned run average: 4.50
- Stats at Baseball Reference

Teams
- Washington Senators (1941)

Roland Arthur Miller (August 28, 1918 – January 6, 1998) was an American pitcher in Major League Baseball. He played for the Washington Senators.
