= Bob Loane =

American baseball player (1914–2002)

- Center fielder
- Born: August 5, 1914; Berkeley, California, U.S.
- Died: December 11, 2002 (aged 88); Monterey, California, U.S.
- Batted: Right Threw: Right

MLB debut
- July 29, 1939, for the Washington Senators

Last MLB appearance
- May 19, 1940, for the Boston Bees

MLB statistics
- Batting average: .161
- Home runs: 0
- Runs batted in: 2
- Stats at Baseball Reference

Teams
- Washington Senators (1939); Boston Bees (1940)

Robert Kenneth Loane (August 5, 1914 – December 11, 2002) was an American Major League Baseball player. He played two seasons with the Washington Senators (1939) and Boston Bees (1940).
