= Harry Dean (baseball) =

American baseball player (1915-1960)

- Pitcher
- Born: May 12, 1915; Rockmart, Georgia
- Died: June 1, 1960 (aged 45); Rockmart, Georgia
- Batted: Right Threw: Right

MLB debut
- April 6, 1941, for the Washington Senators

Last MLB appearance
- April 20, 1941, for the Washington Senators

MLB statistics
- Games pitched: 2
- Innings pitched: 2.0
- Earned run average: 4.50
- Stats at Baseball Reference

Teams
- Washington Senators (1941)

James Harry Dean (May 12, 1915 – June 1, 1960) was a Major League Baseball pitcher. Dean played in two games for the Washington Senators in 1941.
