= Lou Thuman =

American baseball player (1916-2000)

- Pitcher
- Born: December 13, 1916; Baltimore, Maryland, U.S.
- Died: December 19, 2000 (aged 84); Baltimore, Maryland, U.S.
- Batted: Right Threw: Right

MLB debut
- September 8, 1939, for the Washington Senators

Last MLB appearance
- September 22, 1940, for the Washington Senators

MLB statistics
- Win–loss record: 0–1
- Earned run average: 12.00
- Strikeouts: 1
- Stats at Baseball Reference

Teams
- Washington Senators (1939–1940)

Louis Charles Frank Thuman (December 13, 1916 – December 19, 2000) was an American professional baseball player who played in five games for the Washington Senators during the 1939 and 1940 seasons.

After his playing days, Thurman served in the military during World War II from 1941 to 1945.

He was born in Baltimore, Maryland and died there at the age of 84.
