= Stan Spence =

American baseball player (1915–1983)

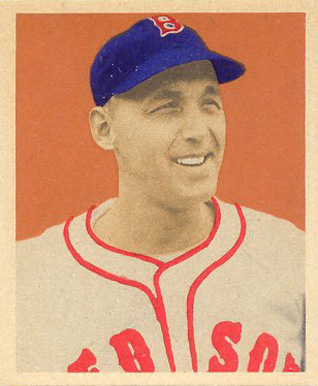
- Center fielder
- Born: March 20, 1915; South Portsmouth, Kentucky, U.S.
- Died: January 9, 1983 (aged 67); Kinston, North Carolina, U.S.
- Batted: Left Threw: Left

MLB debut
- June 8, 1940, for the Boston Red Sox

Last MLB appearance
- October 2, 1949, for the St. Louis Browns

MLB statistics
- Batting average: .282
- Home runs: 95
- Runs batted in: 575
- Stats at Baseball Reference

Teams
- Boston Red Sox (1940–1941); Washington Senators (1942–1944, 1946–1947); Boston Red Sox (1948–1949); St. Louis Browns (1949)

Career highlights and awards
- 4× All-Star (1942, 1944, 1946, 1947)

Stanley Orville Spence (March 20, 1915 – January 9, 1983) was an American Major League Baseball center fielder who played from 1940 through 1949 for the Boston Red Sox (1940–41, 1948–49), Washington Senators (1942–47) and St. Louis Browns (1949). Spence batted and threw left-handed. He was born in South Portsmouth, Kentucky to Jesse and Catherine (Byers) Spence.

A part-time player for the Boston Red Sox during two years, Spence played his first full-season for the Washington Senators in 1942 and he responded ending third in the American League batting race with a .323 average behind Ted Williams (.356) and Johnny Pesky (.331). His most productive season came in 1944, when he hit .316 and posted career-highs with 18 home runs and 100 runs batted in. Also that season, on June 1, Spence went 6-for-6 against the St. Louis Browns, the Senators winning 11–5. After serving in the United States Army for World War II in 1945, he returned to the Senators a year later and hit a career-high 50 doubles with 10 triples and 16 home runs. Spence did a second stint with Boston and ended his majors career with the St. Louis Browns. A four-time All-Star in 1942, 1944, 1946 and 1947, he also was considered in the MVP vote in 1942 and from 1945 to 1947.

Spence hit a pivotal single in the 1947 Major League All-Star Game at Wrigley Field. Prior to his at-bat, former teammate Bobby Doerr singled, stole second, and then took third on pitcher Johnny Sain's errant pickoff attempt. Spence's pinch single resulted in the final margin of 2–1.

In a nine-season career, Spence was a .282 hitter with 95 home runs and 575 RBI in 1112 games. He recorded a .984 fielding percentage playing at all three outfield positions and at first base.

In 1983, Spence was one of the initial four inductees in the Kinston Professional Baseball Hall of Fame. Pat Crawford, Charlie Keller and George Suggs were the others.

Spence died of emphysema in Kinston, North Carolina, at age 67.

== See also ==
- List of Major League Baseball annual triples leaders
- List of Major League Baseball single-game hits leaders
