= Ed Leip =

American baseball player (1910–1983)

- Second baseman
- Born: November 29, 1910; Trenton, New Jersey, U.S.
- Died: November 24, 1983 (aged 72); Zephyrhills, Florida, U.S.
- Batted: Right Threw: Right

MLB debut
- September 16, 1939, for the Washington Senators

Last MLB appearance
- April 30, 1942, for the Pittsburgh Pirates

MLB statistics
- Batting average: .274
- Home runs: 0
- Runs batted in: 5
- Stats at Baseball Reference

Teams
- Washington Senators (1939); Pittsburgh Pirates (1940–1942)

Edgar Ellsworth Leip (November 29, 1910 – November 24, 1983) was an American second baseman in Major League Baseball. He played for the Washington Senators and Pittsburgh Pirates.

Leip left the Pirates and entered the United States Army during World War II and did not return to the majors after the war.
