= Bill Kennedy (baseball, born 1918) =

American baseball player (1918-1995)

- Pitcher
- Born: December 22, 1918; Alexandria, Virginia, U.S.
- Died: August 20, 1995 (aged 76); Alexandria, Virginia, U.S.
- Batted: Left Threw: Left

MLB debut
- May 1, 1942, for the Washington Senators

Last MLB appearance
- September 26, 1947, for the Washington Senators

MLB statistics
- Win–loss record: 1–3
- Earned run average: 6.79
- Strikeouts: 23
- Stats at Baseball Reference

Teams
- Washington Senators (1942, 1946–1947)

William Gorman Kennedy (December 22, 1918 – August 20, 1995) was an American professional baseball pitcher. A left-hander and native of Alexandria, Virginia, he appeared in 31 games over parts of three seasons (1942, 1946–1947) with the Washington Senators of Major League Baseball. Kennedy was listed as 6 feet 1 inch (1.85 m) tall and 175 pounds (79 kg).

Kennedy signed with his hometown Senators' organization in 1939. In his first two pro seasons, spent in the Class D Florida State League, he lost 19 games in 1939, then won 19 contests the following year. He led the Class A1 Southern Association in earned run average in 1942 (2.43). That same year, he debuted with the Senators in May, working in eight games (six in relief, losing his only decision and posting a poor 9.00 ERA; he was credited with two saves. He spent 1943 through 1945 in the United States Army, where he served in the European Theater of World War II.

In 1946, the first full postwar season, Kennedy spent the entire year on the Senators' MLB roster, working in 21 games and gaining his only big-league victory, with three more saves. But the following year he was ineffective in two more relief appearances. He spent most of 1947 and the remainder of his 12-year career in minor league baseball, leaving the game in 1953.

During his MLB tenure, he compiled a 1–3 won–lost record, five saves, one complete game in four starting assignments, and a 6.79 earned run average. He allowed 71 hits and 44 bases on balls, with 23 strikeouts, in 63 2/3 innings pitched. His victory came on June 3 at Griffith Stadium when he threw 4 2/3 shutout innings in relief of Dutch Leonard against the Detroit Tigers.

Kennedy died in Alexandria at the age of 76 on August 20, 1995.
