= Luke Appling =

American baseball player (1907–1991)

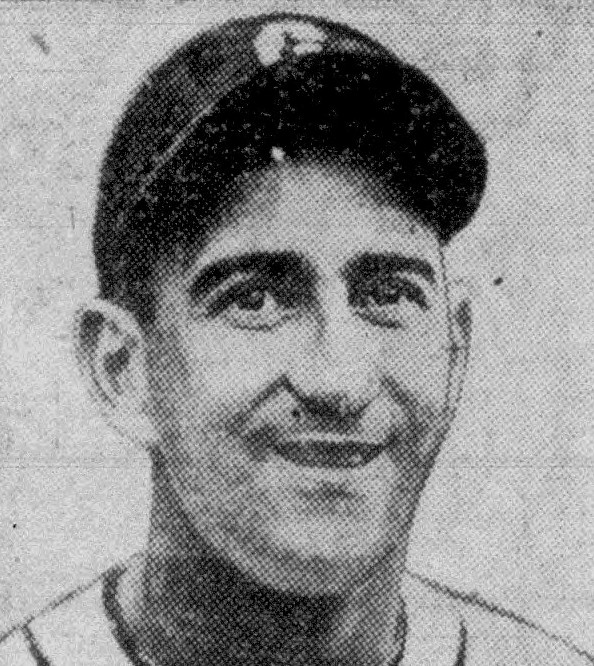
- Appling with the Chicago White Sox, c. 1942
- Shortstop
- Born: April 2, 1907; High Point, North Carolina, U.S.
- Died: January 3, 1991 (aged 83); Cumming, Georgia, U.S.
- Batted: Right Threw: Right

MLB debut
- September 10, 1930, for the Chicago White Sox

Last MLB appearance
- October 1, 1950, for the Chicago White Sox

MLB statistics
- Batting average: .310
- Hits: 2,749
- Home runs: 45
- Runs batted in: 1,116
- Stats at Baseball Reference
- Managerial record at Baseball Reference

Teams
- As player: Chicago White Sox (1930–1943, 1945–1950); As manager: Kansas City Athletics (1967)

Career highlights and awards
- 7× All-Star (1936, 1939–1941, 1943, 1946, 1947); 2× AL batting champion (1936, 1943); Chicago White Sox No. 4 retired

Member of the National

Baseball Hall of Fame
- Induction: 1964
- Vote: 94.0% (seventh ballot)

Lucius Benjamin Appling (April 2, 1907 – January 3, 1991), nicknamed "Old Aches and Pains", was an American professional baseball shortstop who played 20 seasons in Major League Baseball for the Chicago White Sox (1930–1950). He was elected to the Baseball Hall of Fame in 1964.

Born in North Carolina, Appling briefly attended Oglethorpe College. He was signed by the minor league Atlanta Crackers in 1930 and debuted with the Chicago White Sox later that year. He interrupted his career to serve in World War II in 1944 and 1945. He played for Chicago until 1950, then was a minor league manager and major league coach for many years. He served one stint as an interim major league manager in 1967. He died in Georgia in 1991.

== Early life and career ==
Appling was born in High Point, North Carolina. He attended Fulton High School in Atlanta, Georgia. He later said that he had been lefthanded, a trait that he shared with his father, until he was in high school. At that point, he said that he became righthanded because he wanted to play shortstop.

Appling attended Oglethorpe College in Atlanta for two years. In 1930, the Oglethorpe baseball team was undefeated in a 15-game season; in his last game at Oglethorpe, Appling hit three home runs against Mercer University. Appling signed with the Atlanta Crackers of the Southern League that year. He was a good hitter in his first year, but committed 42 errors in 104 games. The Chicago Cubs showed some interest at first, but decided not to sign him, and the White Sox ended up purchasing him from the Crackers for $20,000.

== MLB playing career ==
=== Early career ===
Appling appeared in only six games for the White Sox in 1930. He hit for a .232 batting average in 96 games in 1931. In 1933 his average increased from .274 to .322 in his first of nine straight .300 seasons. The White Sox lost more than 90 games in four of Appling's first five seasons with the team.

In 1936, Appling batted .388, with 124 runs batted in, scored 111 times, recorded 204 hits, and had a team-record 27-game hitting streak. His batting average was good for the first AL batting title won by a shortstop. It was the highest batting average recorded by a shortstop in the 20th century. (Note: Retroactively, due to the Negro leagues being deemed major league status, Willie Wells has the highest batting average for a shortstop for a major league shortstop of the 20th century, having batted .411 in 90 games for the St. Louis Stars in the 1930 Negro National League season. At any rate, Appling's 1936 mark ranked the highest for all AL/NL shortstops in the 20th century. Nomar Garciaparra was the closest to Appling's mark, having batted .372 in 2000.) He finished second in the AL Most Valuable Player voting and earned his first All-Star Game selection. He also turned a league-leading 119 double plays.

=== Later career ===
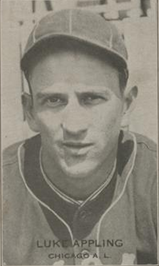
Appling in 1934 card as member of the Chicago White Sox

Appling hit .317 in 1937 as the White Sox finished in third place in the AL. He played in 81 games in 1938, missing much of the season with a broken leg.

In 1940, Appling hit .348 with a career-high 13 triples. Although the team finished fourth, they came closer to a league championship than at any point in his career, eight games behind the league champion Detroit Tigers. Appling won another batting title in 1943 with a .328 average and also led the league in OBP that year (.419).

Appling missed the entire 1944 season due to military service in the United States Army, then returned in time to appear in only 18 games the next year.

He hit .309 in 149 games in 1946. Though his seventh and final All-Star Game selection came in 1947 when he hit .306, Appling hit .314 and .301 in 1948 and 1949, respectively. Appling had remained a solid contributor into his forties, but White Sox ownership was dedicated to a youth movement and he retired after the 1950 season.

=== Career statistics ===
In 2,422 games over 20 seasons, Appling posted a .310 batting average (2,749-for-8,856) with 1,319 runs, 440 doubles, 102 triples, 45 home runs, 1,116 RBI, 179 stolen bases, 1,302 bases on balls, .399 on-base percentage and .398 slugging percentage. He finished his career with a .948 fielding percentage playing primarily at shortstop, but also played at third, second and first base.

=== Legacy ===
Upon his retirement, Appling was the all-time leader for most games played and for double plays by a major league shortstop, and the all-time leader for putouts and assists by an American League shortstop. These records were broken by Luis Aparicio, who also spent the majority of his career with the White Sox. He made 643 errors and has the worst fielding percentage since 1910 of players with at least 1,900 games, but his speed and range made his defensive ability excellent nonetheless throughout his career.

Appling was a good lead-off hitter who topped the .400 mark in OBP eight times (1935–1937, 1939–40, 1943, 1948–49) and drew over 100 walks three times (1935, 1939, 1949), although he often batted third due to otherwise poor team hitting on the White Sox.

He was well known for his ability to foul off pitches. Charlie Metro testified to this reputation: "The old White Sox shortstop Luke Appling was a delight. I've heard quite a few stories about Luke, but the one that always pleases me the most is about watching Luke take batting practice. As extra guys with the Tigers, we wouldn't get too many swings in batting practice, if any, but we liked to go out to the ballpark early and watch them taking batting practice. Luke was a star for the ball club, a good hitter, a good fielder, good at driving in runs, good everything, just a good, good ballplayer. The White Sox then were noted for their stinginess. You couldn't get a baseball out of them. Luke was popular, and everybody wanted an autographed baseball from a big league club, and especially from a guy like Luke. So he'd ask for the baseballs, and the White Sox management would send a message down, 'No!' He couldn't get any baseballs for autographs. So Luke would take batting practice early. I don't know whether he hit third, fourth, or fifth, I forget, but he'd lead off the batting practice. He could foul off every pitch. He was noted for fouling off pitches. He'd foul the balls into the grandstand, and the kids would grab the balls. Luke would flip the bat and look up at the press box as if to say, 'Take that!' I saw him do it once, and they talked about him doing that all the time. I understand he got baseballs pretty much whenever he wanted. It was either that, or he'd lose them all in batting practice."

Appling was famous among his teammates for complaining about minor ailments such as a sore back, a weak shoulder, shin splints, or a sprained finger. While much of this complaining was probably for show it earned him the nicknames "Old Aches and Pains" and "Libby", the latter after blues singer Libby Holman. "His constant stream of complaints might have become intolerable to his teammates if Appling had not developed a novel remedy", wrote Robert McG. Thomas Jr. of The New York Times. "He simply took his misery out on opposing pitchers, rapping out 2,749 hits, all but 587 of them singles."

== Later life ==
Luke Appling's number 4 was retired by the Chicago White Sox in 1975.

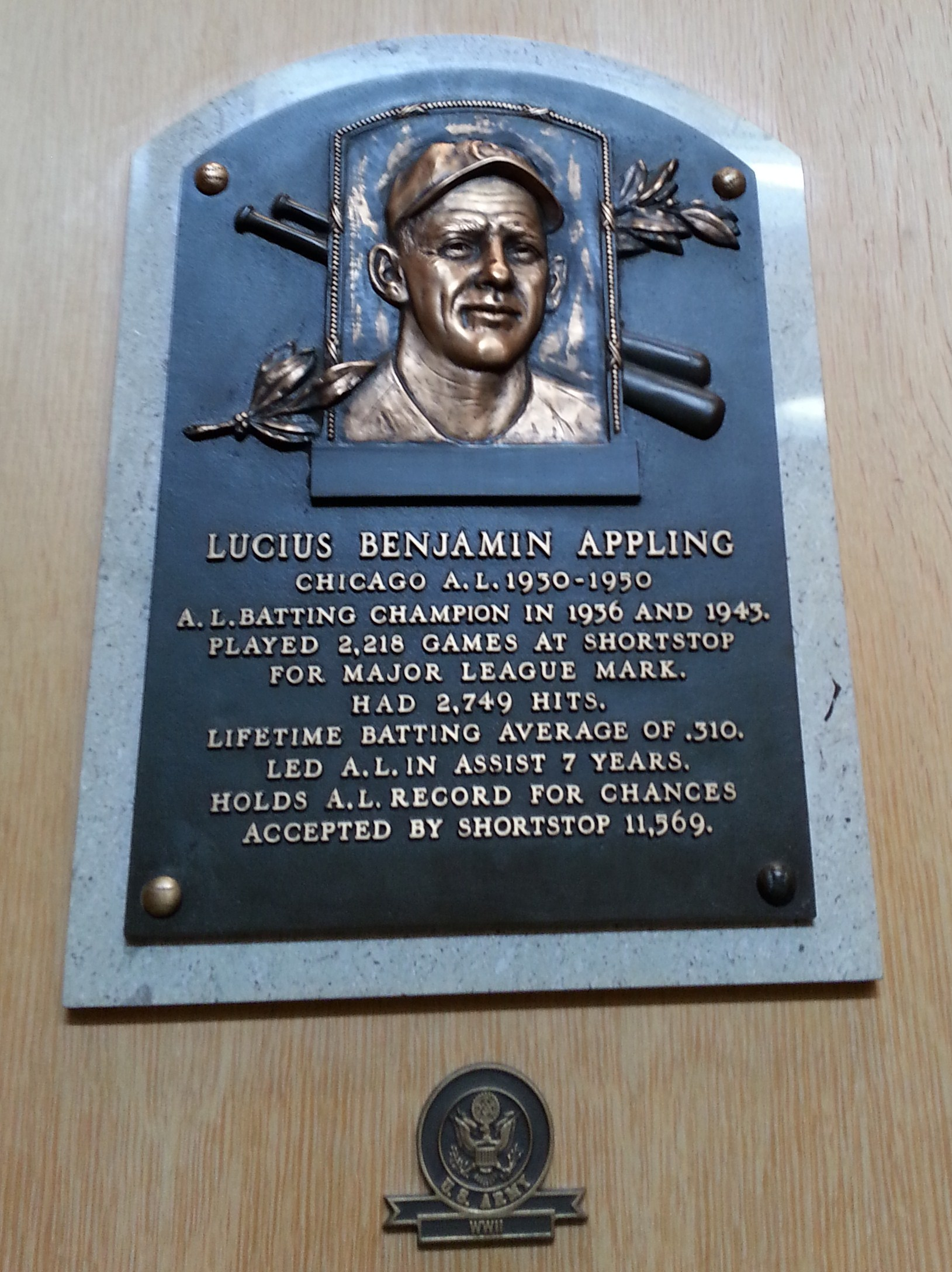
Appling's plaque at the Baseball Hall of Fame

Appling was a successful minor league manager after his playing days were over, winning pennants with Memphis in the Southern Association and Indianapolis of the American Association and being named minor league manager of the year in 1952.

Beginning in 1954, he managed the unaffiliated Richmond Virginians, a Class AAA team in the International League which affiliated with the New York Yankees in 1958 but after 1964 moved and became the Toledo Mud Hens.

Appling's only chance to manage at the major league level was as a late-season replacement for Alvin Dark as manager of the Kansas City Athletics in 1967, which resulted in his major league managerial record of just 10-30.

Appling was a major league coach for the Cleveland Indians, Detroit Tigers, Baltimore Orioles, Athletics and White Sox during the 1960s and early 1970s.

Though Appling received only two Baseball Hall of Fame votes when he appeared on the ballot in 1953, he was eventually elected in 1964. No candidate had received enough votes for induction based on the initial 1964 election; however, Appling was named on the most ballots and he defeated Red Ruffing in a subsequent runoff vote.

In 1970, the Chicago chapter of the Baseball Writers' Association of America named Appling the greatest player in the history of the White Sox. In 1981, Lawrence Ritter and Donald Honig included him in their book The 100 Greatest Baseball Players of All Time.

On July 19, 1982, Appling played in the initial 1982 Cracker Jack Old Timers game (1982-1990) at Robert F. Kennedy Memorial Stadium in Washington, D.C., where the then 75-year-old Hall of Fame shortstop hit a home run off Warren Spahn in the first inning into the left field bleachers, the ball having traveled 265 feet. RFK Stadium was in football configuration at the time, resulting in a short left-field fence.

In 1989, The New York Times profiled the then 82-year-old Appling, who had been an annual Spring Training coach with the Atlanta Braves for 14 years and was also serving as a minor league coach during the season.

On January 3, 1991, two days after retiring from the Atlanta coaching staff, Appling was in a hospital in Cumming, Georgia, suffering from an abdominal aortic aneurysm. He died during emergency surgery.

"Old Aches and Pains" was interred in Sawnee View Memorial Gardens, Mausoleum Chapel West in Cumming, Georgia.

Pitcher Eddie Lopat remembered Appling, saying, "I played with him and against him, and he was the finest shortstop I ever saw. In the field, he covered more ground than anyone in the league. As a hitting shortstop, there was no one in his class."

In 1999, he was named as a finalist to the Major League Baseball All-Century Team.

In 2013, the Bob Feller Act of Valor Award honored Appling as one of 37 Baseball Hall of Fame members for his service in the United States Army during World War II.

== See also ==
- Chicagoland Sports Hall of Fame
- List of Major League Baseball career hits leaders
- List of Major League Baseball career doubles leaders
- List of Major League Baseball career triples leaders
- List of Major League Baseball career runs scored leaders
- List of Major League Baseball career runs batted in leaders
- List of Major League Baseball batting champions
- List of Major League Baseball career stolen bases leaders
- List of Major League Baseball players who spent their entire career with one franchise
