= Jack Sanford (first baseman) =

American baseball player (1917–2005)

- First baseman
- Born: June 23, 1917; Chatham, Virginia, U.S.
- Died: January 4, 2005 (aged 87); Greensboro, North Carolina, U.S.
- Batted: Right Threw: Right

MLB debut
- August 24, 1940, for the Washington Senators

Last MLB appearance
- May 9, 1946, for the Washington Senators

MLB statistics
- Batting average: .209
- Home runs: 0
- Runs batted in: 11
- Stats at Baseball Reference

Teams
- Washington Senators (1940–1941, 1946)

John Doward Sanford (June 23, 1917 – January 4, 2005) was an American first baseman in Major League Baseball who played his entire career for the Washington Senators. Listed at 6 feet 3 inches (1.91 m) tall and 195 pounds (88 kg), Sanford batted and threw right-handed. He was born in Chatham, Virginia.

Basically a line-drive hitter and a fine defensive player, Sanford was one of many ballplayers who interrupted their careers to serve during World War II. He signed with the Senators out of the University of Richmond, where he lettered in baseball, basketball, football and track.

Sanford made his American League debut on August 24, 1940 at Griffith Stadium. In his debut, he left six men on base in a two-run loss. His -0.437 win probability added is the lowest of any debutant in Major League history. Sanford played for the Washington Senators in the 1940 and 1941 seasons as a backup for Zeke Bonura and Mickey Vernon at first base. He served in the U.S. Air Force from 1941 to 1946, playing and coaching on baseball teams there, then returned to major league action briefly in 1946.

In a three-season career, Sanford was a .231 hitter (32-for-153) with 13 runs and 11 RBI in 47 games, including four doubles and four triples without home runs or stolen bases.

Sanford died in Greensboro, North Carolina, at the age of 87.
