= Jimmy Pofahl =

American baseball player (1917-1984)

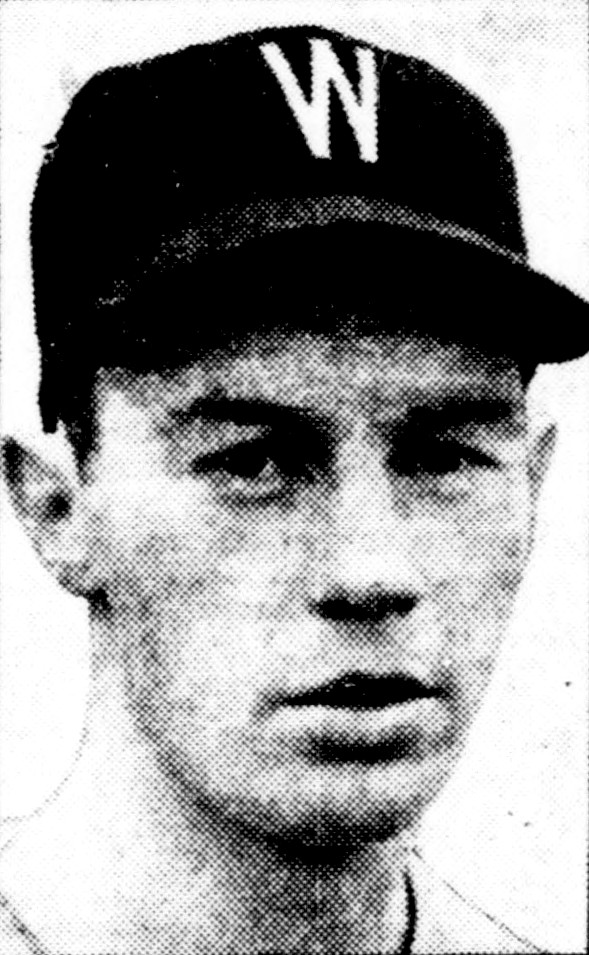
- Pofahl, circa 1941
- Shortstop
- Born: June 18, 1917; Faribault, Minnesota, U.S.
- Died: September 14, 1984 (aged 67); Owatonna, Minnesota, U.S.
- Batted: Right Threw: Right

MLB debut
- April 16, 1940, for the Washington Senators

Last MLB appearance
- September 20, 1942, for the Washington Senators

MLB statistics
- Batting average: .220
- Home runs: 2
- Runs batted in: 70
- Stats at Baseball Reference

Teams
- Washington Senators (1940–1942)

James Willard Pofahl (June 18, 1917 – September 14, 1984) was an American shortstop in Major League Baseball. He played for the Washington Senators.

== Career ==
Pofahl played high school baseball at Faribault High School. He was discovered in Faribault Legion baseball. He then played for the Minneapolis Millers, and at 22, led the American Association in hitting before he sprained his wrist. When the Washington Senators purchased his rights for $40,000, he held a .303 batting average.

In 1940, Pofahl was slow to sign his contract as a rookie, which frustrated Senators owner Clark Griffith. Pofahl also had his arm smashed by a closing cab door and had some arm trouble, but still, he played shortstop regularly for the Senators. He was traded in March of 1943 to the Philadelphia Athletics for Bob Johnson and cash. He never played another professional baseball game.

Pofahl spent three years in the MLB and hit two home runs his rookie year (both were inside-the park). He averaged a .220 batting average with the Senators.

== Personal life ==
Following his stint in the major leagues, Pofahl returned to Minnesota. In April 1947, he started Gopher Sport in Owatonna with Malcom Stephenson. Pofahl died in Owatonna in 1984 and was buried in Maple Lawn Cemetery in Faribault.

In 1991, after his death, he was inducted into the Faribault Sports Hall of Fame.
