= Mike Kreevich =

American baseball player (1908–1994)

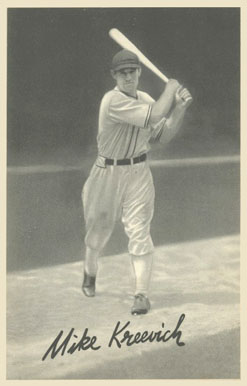
- Center fielder
- Born: June 10, 1908; Mount Olive, Illinois, U.S.
- Died: April 25, 1994 (aged 85); Pana, Illinois, U.S.
- Batted: Right Threw: Right

MLB debut
- September 7, 1931, for the Chicago Cubs

Last MLB appearance
- September 23, 1945, for the Washington Senators

MLB statistics
- Batting average: .283
- Home runs: 45
- Runs batted in: 514
- Stats at Baseball Reference

Teams
- Chicago Cubs (1931); Chicago White Sox (1935–1941); Philadelphia Athletics (1942); St. Louis Browns (1943–1945); Washington Senators (1945)

Career highlights and awards
- All-Star (1938)

Michael Andreas Kreevich (June 10, 1908 – April 25, 1994) was an American professional baseball player. He played as a center fielder in Major League Baseball from 1931 to 1945. He batted and threw right-handed.

== Early life ==
Kreevich was born in Mount Olive, Illinois. He started working in coal mines in late 1924 at the age of 16. Although short of stature (five feet and seven and a half inches tall), he developed a muscular physique while coal mining for almost five years. With the Great Depression, the coal mines closed in 1930. It was about this time that he was invited to play for a team in McCook, Nebraska. Kreevich soon went from that small town team to the National League's Chicago Cubs, thanks to a scout who recognized the talent in him.

== Career ==
Kreevich began his career in 1931 with the Chicago Cubs, but only played five games for them. In 1935, he joined the cross-town Chicago White Sox, but did not become a regular until 1936. In 1937 he led the American League in triples and sacrifice flies while batting .302, and finishing 10th in the American League MVP Award voting. In 1939, he again finished 10th in the American League MVP Award voting, while batting .323. He was also named to the American League All-Star team in 1938.

After the 1941 season, Kreevich was traded to the Philadelphia Athletics. He was released after only one season, and signed with the St. Louis Browns before the 1943 campaign. While with the Browns he played in the all-St. Louis 1944 World Series against the Cardinals. In the middle of the 1945 season, he was purchased by the Washington Senators; he finished his career after that season in the nation's capital.

In 1,241 games played over 12 seasons, Kreevich compiled a .283 batting average (1321-4676) with 676 runs, 221 doubles, 75 triples, 45 home runs, 514 RBIs, 115 stolen bases, 446 bases on balls, .346 on-base percentage and a .391 slugging percentage. His career fielding percentage was .981.

== See also ==
- List of Major League Baseball annual triples leaders
