= Ray Goolsby =

American baseball player (1919-1999)

- Outfielder
- Born: September 5, 1919; Florala, Alabama, U.S.
- Died: November 13, 1999 (aged 80); Apopka, Florida, U.S.
- Batted: Right Threw: Right

MLB debut
- April 18, 1946, for the Washington Senators

Last MLB appearance
- April 22, 1946, for the Washington Senators

MLB statistics
- Batting average: .000
- Games played: 3
- Walks: 1
- Stats at Baseball Reference

Teams
- Washington Senators (1946)

Raymond Daniel Goolsby (September 5, 1919 – November 13, 1999) was an American professional baseball player. His career, interrupted by World War II, lasted for only four seasons, but included three games played in Major League Baseball for the 1946 Washington Senators. Nicknamed "Ox" and an outfielder by trade, he was listed as 6 feet 1 inch (1.85 m) tall and 185 pounds (84 kg); he threw and batted right-handed.

Goolsby was born in Florala, Alabama, and his family moved to Central Florida in 1925 when he turned six. He entered pro ball in 1939 and played three seasons in the Florida State League, then a Class D circuit at the lowest level of Organized Baseball. In 1942, he joined the U.S. military; his obituary states that he served in the United States Navy, but, according to Baseball in Wartime, he served in the United States Army.

In 1946, the first postwar season, MLB rosters were temporarily expanded to accommodate returning military veterans resuming their baseball careers; teams carried 36 players until June 15. Goolsby broke spring training camp with Washington and appeared in three mid-April games: on the 18th and 19th as a pinch hitter, and on the 22nd as the Senators' starting left fielder. In those three contests, he had four at bats without a hit, with one walk and one sacrifice. He then played the rest of the year at Double-A Chattanooga, hitting .306 in 99 games.

Goolsby, then 27, left baseball after the 1946 season. He worked in the citrus industry, rising to manager. He died in Apopka, Florida, at the age of 80. His wife was Lucy R. Goolsby, whom he married November 1, 1940 in Apopka.
