= Walt Masterson =

American baseball player (1920–2008)

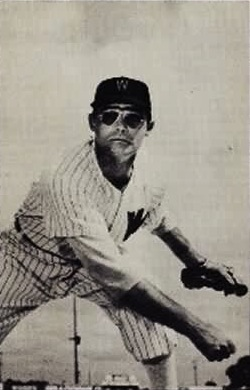
- Pitcher
- Born: June 22, 1920; Philadelphia, Pennsylvania, U.S.
- Died: April 5, 2008 (aged 87); Durham, North Carolina, U.S.
- Batted: Right Threw: Right

MLB debut
- May 8, 1939, for the Washington Senators

Last MLB appearance
- September 24, 1956, for the Detroit Tigers

MLB statistics
- Win–loss record: 78–100
- Earned run average: 4.15
- Strikeouts: 815
- Stats at Baseball Reference

Teams
- Washington Senators (1939–1942, 1945–1949); Boston Red Sox (1949–1952); Washington Senators (1952–1953); Detroit Tigers (1956)

Career highlights and awards
- 2× All-Star (1947, 1948)

Walter Edward Masterson III (June 22, 1920 – April 5, 2008) was an American right-handed pitcher in Major League Baseball who played for the Washington Senators, Boston Red Sox and Detroit Tigers. He started the 1948 Major League Baseball All-Star Game for the American League.

Born in Philadelphia, Masterson attended Northeast Catholic High School and signed with the Senators at age 17. He was listed as 6 feet 2 inches (1.88 m) tall and 189 pounds (86 kg).

In 14 MLB seasons, he had a 78–100 win-loss record, 399 games (184 started), 70 complete games, 15 shutouts, 115 games finished, 20 saves, 1,649 2/3 innings pitched, 1,613 hits allowed, 888 runs allowed, 760 earned runs allowed, 101 home runs allowed, 886 walks allowed, 815 strikeouts, 28 hit batsmen, 33 wild pitches, 7,281 batters faced, 1 balk, a 4.15 earned run average and a 1.515 WHIP. He missed the 1943 and 1944 seasons while serving in the Navy from September 1942 to July 1945 during World War II, serving on submarines in the Pacific. He later served as a pitching coach for the Texas Rangers in 1972 under manager Ted Williams. Masterson later served as baseball coach at George Mason University in 1980–81. In his time there, he focused on reducing the number of stolen bases, by having his pitchers stand in a wide stance, for good balance regardless of where they needed to throw the ball.

While in his final years in North Carolina, he enjoyed time with his wife, and was working on a book to help Little League coaches be efficient and fun.

He died of a stroke at age 87 at Duke University Hospital in Durham, North Carolina.
