= Cecil Travis =

American baseball player and scout (1913-2006)

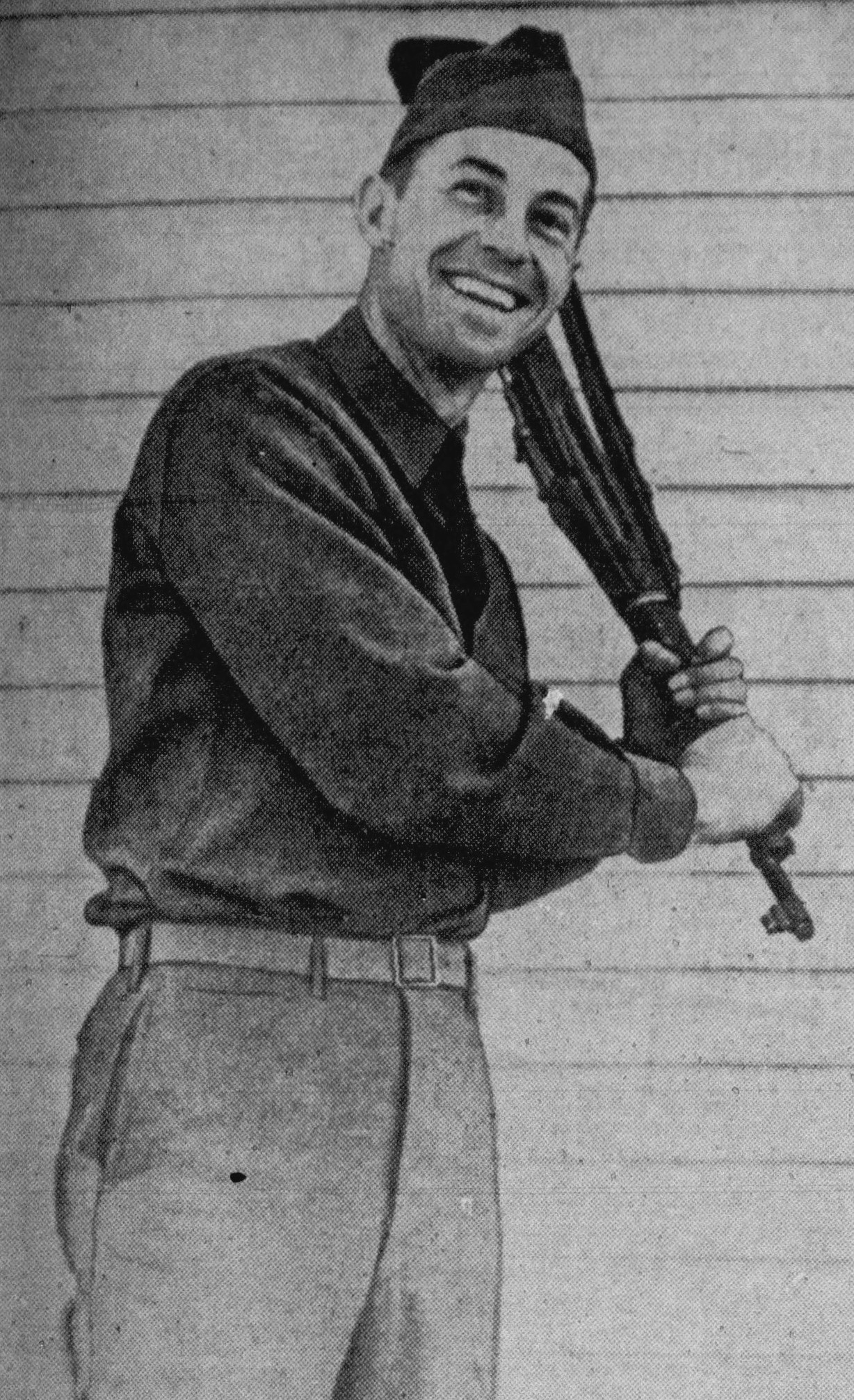
- Travis during his time in the United States Army, circa 1942.
- Shortstop / Third baseman
- Born: August 8, 1913; Riverdale, Georgia, U.S.
- Died: December 16, 2006 (aged 93); Riverdale, Georgia, U.S.
- Batted: Left Threw: Right

MLB debut
- May 16, 1933, for the Washington Senators

Last MLB appearance
- September 23, 1947, for the Washington Senators

MLB statistics
- Batting average: .314
- Home runs: 27
- Runs batted in: 657
- Stats at Baseball Reference

Teams
- Washington Senators (1933–1941, 1945–1947)

Career highlights and awards
- 3× All-Star (1938, 1940, 1941)

Cecil Howell Travis (August 8, 1913 – December 16, 2006) was an American professional baseball player and scout. He played his entire career in Major League Baseball as a shortstop and third baseman for the Washington Senators from 1933 to 1947, losing four seasons to military service during World War II. He led the American League in hits in 1941. His career batting average of .314 is a record for American League shortstops, and ranks third among all shortstops, behind Honus Wagner (.327) and Arky Vaughan (.318).

== Biography ==
Travis was born on a farm in Riverdale, Georgia, the youngest of ten children, and declined a scholarship to Georgia Tech in favor of a scholarship to a baseball training school. A left-handed batter, he broke in with the Senators in 1933, getting five hits in his first game – joining Fred Clarke as the second player to do so – and batting .302 in 18 games at age 19. Prior to 2019, it was the last pennant-winning campaign by a Washington team, although Travis did not play in the five-game World Series loss to the New York Giants. The following year he began to take over third base duties from veteran Ossie Bluege, and batted .319 as the team plummeted to seventh place. He followed by hitting .318, .317, .344 and .335, playing full-time at shortstop from 1937 to 1939, but the 82-71 1936 team – on which he split time between shortstop and right field – would remain the only winning squad for which he would play regularly. He led the AL with 29 double plays at third base in 1935.

In 1938 he was named to his first All-Star team, and placed ninth in the AL's MVP voting. After slipping to a .292 average in 1939 while suffering two cases of the flu, he returned with All-Star seasons in 1940 and 1941, hitting .322 and .359 (second in the AL as Ted Williams batted .406). In the latter year Travis enjoyed his best overall season with career highs of 101 runs batted in, 106 runs scored, 39 doubles, 19 triples and 7 home runs, along with his league-best 218 hits, and finished sixth in the MVP vote.

Travis entered the Army in the winter of 1941–42, and spent most of World War II in the United States, playing on military baseball teams. Sent to Europe in late 1944 while serving in the 76th Infantry Division, he suffered a severe case of frostbite during the Battle of the Bulge, necessitating an operation to prevent amputation of his feet. Travis received a Bronze Star for his military service. Although only 31 years old when he returned to baseball, he was not the same player as he had been before the war, and hit .241 in late 1945 and .252 in 1946. He retired after batting .216 in 74 games in 1947. Travis batted only .241 (174-723) over 226 games played his last three seasons with just 2 home runs and 76 RBI. Along with Buddy Lewis, he was cited by Bill James as a player who lost their shot at the Hall of Fame due to their wartime service. One month before his final game, he was honored with "Cecil Travis Night" at Griffith Stadium, with General Dwight D. Eisenhower in attendance.

In his career, Travis had 1544 hits, 665 runs, 657 RBI, 265 doubles, 78 triples, 27 home runs, 402 walks and 23 stolen bases in 1328 games. He was a Senators scout until 1956, and then returned to his family farm. He was inducted into the Georgia Sports Hall of Fame in 1975. He died at his home in December 2006 at age 93.

== See also ==
- List of Major League Baseball players who spent their entire career with one franchise
