= Al Evans =

American baseball player (1916–1979)

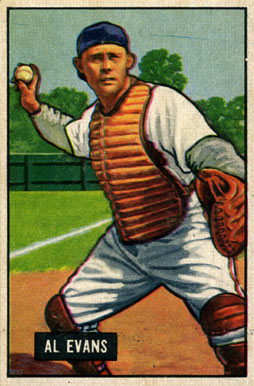
- Catcher
- Born: September 28, 1916; Kenly, North Carolina, U.S.
- Died: April 6, 1979 (aged 62); Wilson, North Carolina, U.S.
- Batted: Right Threw: Right

MLB debut
- September 13, 1939, for the Washington Senators

Last MLB appearance
- August 5, 1951, for the Boston Red Sox

MLB statistics
- Batting average: .250
- Home runs: 13
- Runs batted in: 211
- Stats at Baseball Reference

Teams
- Washington Senators (1939–1942, 1944–1950); Boston Red Sox (1951)

Alfred Hubert Evans (September 28, 1916 – April 6, 1979) was an American Major League Baseball catcher and a Minor League manager. Listed at 5 feet 11 inches (1.80 m) tall and 190 pounds (86 kg), Evans batted and threw right-handed. He was born in Kenly, North Carolina.

Basically a contact, line-drive hitter, Evans was a fine reserve catcher with a strong throwing arm. As many bigleaguers, he saw his baseball career interrupted while serving in the US Navy during World War II.

Evans reached the majors in 1939 with the Washington Senators, playing for them four years before joining the military (1943–44). He was released from the Navy in time for the end of the 1944 season with the Senators, staying with the club until 1950. His most productive season came in 1949, when he posted career-highs in games (109), batting average (.271), RBI (42), runs (32), and doubles. He also played briefly with the Boston Red Sox in 1951, his last Major League season.

In a 12-season career, Evans was a .250 hitter (514-for-2053) with 13 home runs and 211 RBI in 704 games, including 188 runs, 70 doubles, 23 triples, 14 stolen bases, and a .332 on-base percentage. In 647 catching appearances, he recorded 2295 outs, 284 assists, 51 double plays, and committed 56 errors in 2635 chances for a .979 fielding percentage.

Following his playing retirement, Evans managed for the New York Yankees (1955), Kansas City Athletics (1955–1959) and Minnesota Twins (1963–1965) minor league systems. He scouted for the Senators, Twins, and San Francisco Giants.

Evans died in Wilson, North Carolina, at age 62.

== See also ==
- Boston Red Sox all-time roster
- May 3, 1949 in baseball
