= 1944 Pittsburgh Pirates season =

1944 Pittsburgh Pirates
- League: National League
- Ballpark: Forbes Field
- City: Pittsburgh, Pennsylvania
- Owners: Bill Benswanger
- Managers: Frankie Frisch
- Radio: WWSW; Rosey Rowswell, Jack Craddock

The 1944 Pittsburgh Pirates season was the 63rd season of the Pittsburgh Pirates franchise; the 58th in the National League. The Pirates finished second in the league standings with a record of 90–63.

== Regular season ==
=== Season standings ===
National League
Team	W	L	Pct.	GB	Home	Road
St. Louis Cardinals	105	49	.682	—	54‍–‍22	51‍–‍27
Pittsburgh Pirates	90	63	.588	14½	49‍–‍28	41‍–‍35
Cincinnati Reds	89	65	.578	16	45‍–‍33	44‍–‍32
Chicago Cubs	75	79	.487	30	35‍–‍42	40‍–‍37
New York Giants	67	87	.435	38	39‍–‍36	28‍–‍51
Boston Braves	65	89	.422	40	38‍–‍40	27‍–‍49
Brooklyn Dodgers	63	91	.409	42	37‍–‍39	26‍–‍52
Philadelphia Phillies	61	92	.399	43½	29‍–‍49	32‍–‍43

=== Record vs. opponents ===
1944 National League record Sources:
Team	BSN	BRO	CHC	CIN	NYG	PHI	PIT	STL
Boston	—	9–13	11–11	8–14	9–13	11–11–1	9–13	8–14
Brooklyn	13–9	—	8–14–1	8–14	10–12	16–6	4–18	4–18
Chicago	11–11	14–8–1	—	9–13–1	10–12	13–9	12–10–1	6–16
Cincinnati	14–8	14–8	13–9–1	—	15–7	13–19	12–10	8–14
New York	13–9	12–10	12–10	7–15	—	10–12	7–15–1	6–16
Philadelphia	11–11–1	6–16	9–13	9–13	12–10	—	9–12	5–17
Pittsburgh	13–9	18–4	10–12–1	10–12	15–7–1	12–9	—	12–10–3
St. Louis	14–8	18–4	16–6	14–8	16–6	17–5	10–12–3	—

=== Game log ===
1944 Game Log: 90–63 (Home: 49–28; Away: 41–35)
April: 3–5 (Home: 1–1; Away: 2–4)

#	Date	Opponent	Score	Win	Loss	Save	Attendance	Record
1	April 18	@ Cardinals	0–2	Lanier	**Roe** (0–1)	—	4,030	0–1
2	April 20	@ Cardinals	3–5	Munger	**Rescigno** (0–1)	—	2,272	0–2
3	April 21	Reds	2–4	Beggs	**Sewell** (0–1)	—	10,877	0–3
4	April 26	Cubs	6–1	**Roe** (1–1)	Fleming	—	3,463	1–3
5	April 28	@ Reds	0–2	Heusser	**Butcher** (0–1)	—	1,080	1–4
6	April 29	@ Reds	7–3	**Sewell** (1–1)	Ferguson	—	2,695	2–4
7	April 30	@ Reds	7–1	**Strincevich** (1–0)	Riddle	—	—	3–4
8	April 30	@ Reds	1–4	Walters	**Rescigno** (0–2)	—	16,060	3–5

May: 16–11 (Home: 10–6; Away: 6–5)

#	Date	Opponent	Score	Win	Loss	Save	Attendance	Record
9	May 2	Cardinals	3–1	**Roe** (2–1)	Jurisich	**Cuccurullo** (1)	4,895	4–5
10	May 3	Cardinals	1–5	Gumbert	**Sewell** (1–2)	—	5,007	4–6
11	May 4	Cardinals	6–3	**Butcher** (1–1)	Cooper	—	3,877	5–6
12	May 7	@ Cubs	6–5 (14)	**Sewell** (2–2)	Derringer	—	—	6–6
13	May 7	@ Cubs	3–2 (11)	**Rescigno** (1–2)	Wyse	**Butcher** (1)	19,067	7–6
14	May 10	Braves	4–2	**Strincevich** (2–0)	Barrett	**Cuccurullo** (2)	23,011	8–6
15	May 11	Braves	2–7	Tobin	**Butcher** (1–2)	—	2,509	8–7
16	May 12	Braves	3–10	Andrews	**Roe** (2–2)	—	2,302	8–8
17	May 13	Braves	2–16	Barrett	**Rescigno** (1–3)	—	4,037	8–9
18	May 14	Giants	1–0 (10)	**Sewell** (3–2)	Voiselle	—	—	9–9
19	May 14	Giants	8–2	**Strincevich** (3–0)	Pyle	—	23,771	10–9
20	May 15	Giants	7–8	Adams	**Cuccurullo** (0–1)	Polli	1,699	10–10
21	May 17	Dodgers	8–5 (6)	**Roe** (3–2)	McLish	—	18,748	11–10
22	May 18	Dodgers	4–3	**Butcher** (2–2)	Melton	—	3,361	12–10
23	May 19	Dodgers	5–2	**Sewell** (4–2)	Webber	—	2,520	13–10
24	May 20	Phillies	4–3	**Strincevich** (4–0)	Gerheauser	—	4,096	14–10
25	May 21	Phillies	4–3	**Butcher** (3–2)	Schanz	—	—	15–10
26	May 21	Phillies	4–9	Barrett	**Rescigno** (1–4)	—	23,009	15–11
27	May 24	@ Braves	8–1	**Sewell** (5–2)	Tobin	—	1,706	16–11
28	May 25	@ Braves	0–1	Javery	**Strincevich** (4–1)	—	1,318	16–12
29	May 26	@ Braves	7–5	**Rescigno** (2–4)	Hutchinson	**Sewell** (1)	1,518	17–12
30	May 28	@ Phillies	4–0	**Sewell** (6–2)	Schanz	—	—	18–12
31	May 28	@ Phillies	2–8	Barrett	**Strincevich** (4–2)	—	—	18–13
32	May 29	@ Phillies	3–2 (11)	**Rescigno** (3–4)	Raffensberger	—	—	19–13
33	May 30	@ Dodgers	3–9	Flowers	**Butcher** (3–3)	Ostermueller	—	19–14
34	May 30	@ Dodgers	3–4	Gregg	**Rescigno** (3–5)	Davis	25,845	19–15
35	May 31	@ Dodgers	4–8	McLish	**Strincevich** (4–3)	—	16,993	19–16

June: 14–11 (Home: 7–7; Away: 7–4)

#	Date	Opponent	Score	Win	Loss	Save	Attendance	Record
36	June 1	@ Dodgers	2–1	**Sewell** (7–2)	Davis	—	—	20–16
37	June 2	@ Giants	4–6	Fischer	**Roe** (3–3)	Polli	2,532	20–17
38	June 3	@ Giants	7–6 (10)	**Rescigno** (4–5)	Adams	—	9,171	21–17
39	June 4	@ Giants	9–4	**Ostermueller** (1–0)	Voiselle	**Rescigno** (1)	—	22–17
40	June 4	@ Giants	7–4	**Roe** (4–3)	Pyle	**Rescigno** (2)	30,659	23–17
41	June 7	Reds	4–2	**Sewell** (8–2)	de la Cruz	**Rescigno** (3)	17,161	24–17
42	June 8	Cubs	6–10	Vandenberg	**Roe** (4–4)	—	2,616	24–18
43	June 9	Cubs	3–3 (11)			—	13,119	24–18
44	June 10	Cubs	9–4	**Roe** (5–4)	Fleming	—	1,710	25–18
45	June 11	Cubs	0–5	Erickson	**Butcher** (3–4)	—	—	25–19
46	June 11	Cubs	0–1	Chipman	**Strincevich** (4–4)	—	23,016	25–20
47	June 13	@ Reds	3–2 (5)	**Starr** (1–0)	Heusser	—	2,460	26–20
48	June 14	@ Reds	2–3 (11)	Walters	**Rescigno** (4–6)	—	6,455	26–21
49	June 15	@ Reds	1–0	**Butcher** (4–4)	de la Cruz	—	1,101	27–21
50	June 17	@ Cardinals	1–2	Munger	**Roe** (5–5)	—	18,645	27–22
51	June 18	@ Cardinals	2–12	Cooper	**Sewell** (8–3)	—	—	27–23
52	June 18	@ Cardinals	3–1	**Ostermueller** (2–0)	Lanier	—	16,292	28–23
53	June 20	Reds	0–3	Walters	**Butcher** (4–5)	—	7,369	28–24
54	June 21	Reds	2–1	**Starr** (2–0)	Heusser	—	2,414	29–24
55	June 22	Reds	9–4	**Sewell** (9–3)	de la Cruz	—	—	30–24
56	June 22	Reds	7–4	**Strincevich** (5–4)	Gumbert	—	5,394	31–24
57	June 23	Cardinals	5–5 (14)			—	12,086	31–24
58	June 24	Cardinals	0–16	Cooper	**Ostermueller** (2–1)	—	4,899	31–25
59	June 25	Cardinals	1–2	Munger	**Sewell** (9–4)	—	—	31–26
60	June 25	Cardinals	5–5			—	33,111	31–26
61	June 28	Giants	9–2	**Butcher** (5–5)	Fischer	—	18,479	32–26
62	June 29	Giants	1–1 (5)			—	2,057	32–26
63	June 30	Giants	5–7	Adams	**Sewell** (9–5)	—	—	32–27
64	June 30	Giants	9–8	**Cuccurullo** (1–1)	Adams	—	5,378	33–27

July: 19–13 (Home: 8–3; Away: 11–10)

#	Date	Opponent	Score	Win	Loss	Save	Attendance	Record
65	July 1	Braves	5–1	**Starr** (3–0)	Tobin	—	2,940	34–27
66	July 2	Braves	1–4	Andrews	**Roe** (5–6)	—	—	34–28
67	July 2	Braves	7–6 (12)	**Sewell** (10–5)	Barrett	—	16,076	35–28
68	July 4	Phillies	2–3	Gerheauser	**Sewell** (10–6)	Schanz	—	35–29
69	July 4	Phillies	4–0	**Butcher** (6–5)	Lee	—	16,285	36–29
70	July 5	Phillies	2–12	Barrett	**Starr** (3–1)	—	2,055	36–30
71	July 6	Phillies	6–5	**Strincevich** (6–4)	Raffensberger	**Rescigno** (4)	9,136	37–30
72	July 7	Dodgers	13–2	**Ostermueller** (3–1)	Melton	—	2,356	38–30
73	July 8	Dodgers	8–5	**Sewell** (11–6)	McLish	—	3,732	39–30
74	July 9	Dodgers	10–1	**Roe** (6–6)	Head	—	—	40–30
75	July 9	Dodgers	9–7	**Rescigno** (5–6)	Davis	**Ostermueller** (2)	18,706	41–30
76	July 13	@ Cubs	3–2	**Ostermueller** (4–1)	Wyse	—	7,160	42–30
77	July 14	@ Cubs	5–11	Vandenberg	**Starr** (3–2)	—	5,630	42–31
78	July 15	@ Cubs	3–4	Fleming	**Roe** (6–7)	Derringer	6,972	42–32
79	July 16	@ Cubs	0–1	Wyse	**Sewell** (11–7)	—	—	42–33
80	July 16	@ Cubs	1–0	**Butcher** (7–5)	Passeau	—	40,920	43–33
81	July 18	@ Giants	2–5	Voiselle	**Ostermueller** (4–2)	—	26,164	43–34
82	July 19	@ Phillies	2–4	Raffensberger	**Strincevich** (6–5)	—	7,784	43–35
83	July 20	@ Phillies	4–1	**Starr** (4–2)	Lee	—	—	44–35
84	July 20	@ Phillies	2–3 (11)	Schanz	**Rescigno** (5–7)	—	—	44–36
85	July 21	@ Phillies	5–3	**Butcher** (8–5)	Gerheauser	—	8,527	45–36
86	July 22	@ Dodgers	11–0	**Ostermueller** (5–2)	Warren	—	8,479	46–36
87	July 23	@ Dodgers	7–5	**Rescigno** (6–7)	Gregg	—	—	47–36
88	July 23	@ Dodgers	9–4 (11)	**Strincevich** (7–5)	Webber	**Rescigno** (5)	16,571	48–36
89	July 24	@ Dodgers	7–12	Fuchs	**Sewell** (11–8)	Davis	9,072	48–37
90	July 25	@ Giants	15–0	**Butcher** (9–5)	Barthelson	—	4,524	49–37
91	July 26	@ Giants	6–5	**Ostermueller** (6–2)	Feldman	**Strincevich** (1)	12,909	50–37
92	July 28	@ Giants	0–4	Voiselle	**Roe** (6–8)	—	12,871	50–38
93	July 29	@ Braves	3–0	**Sewell** (12–8)	Tobin	—	2,065	51–38
94	July 30	@ Braves	4–6	Klopp	**Starr** (4–3)	Tobin	—	51–39
95	July 30	@ Braves	0–2	Javery	**Strincevich** (7–6)	—	7,143	51–40
96	July 31	@ Braves	9–2	**Ostermueller** (7–2)	Andrews	—	1,346	52–40

August: 20–10 (Home: 17–6; Away: 3–4)

#	Date	Opponent	Score	Win	Loss	Save	Attendance	Record
97	August 1	@ Braves	13–8	**Starr** (5–3)	Tobin	**Sewell** (2)	1,787	53–40
98	August 2	Cardinals	4–8	Lanier	**Sewell** (12–9)	—	27,481	53–41
99	August 3	Cardinals	2–15	Wilks	**Roe** (6–9)	—	3,001	53–42
100	August 4	Cubs	3–4	Derringer	**Butcher** (9–6)	—	10,022	53–43
101	August 5	Cubs	2–7	Fleming	**Ostermueller** (7–3)	Passeau	2,861	53–44
102	August 6	Cubs	13–5	**Roe** (7–9)	Derringer	**Starr** (1)	—	54–44
103	August 6	Cubs	5–4	**Strincevich** (8–6)	Chipman	**Roe** (1)	13,362	55–44
104	August 8	Giants	4–8	Voiselle	**Butcher** (9–7)	—	2,277	55–45
105	August 9	Giants	4–3	**Ostermueller** (8–3)	Fischer	—	12,683	56–45
106	August 10	Giants	10–4	**Roe** (8–9)	Brewer	—	4,324	57–45
107	August 11	Giants	12–8	**Cuccurullo** (2–1)	Pyle	—	13,024	58–45
108	August 12	Giants	8–0	**Butcher** (10–7)	Voiselle	—	3,335	59–45
109	August 13	Braves	8–1	**Sewell** (13–9)	Tobin	—	—	60–45
110	August 13	Braves	3–1	**Ostermueller** (9–3)	Hutchings	—	15,079	61–45
111	August 14	Braves	5–0	**Roe** (9–9)	Barrett	—	2,409	62–45
112	August 15	Braves	7–5	**Rescigno** (7–7)	Hutchinson	**Strincevich** (2)	12,397	63–45
113	August 17	Phillies	7–6	**Rescigno** (8–7)	Karl	—	—	64–45
114	August 17	Phillies	6–5 (10)	**Strincevich** (9–6)	Barrett	—	3,262	65–45
115	August 18	Phillies	2–3	Raffensberger	**Sewell** (13–10)	—	14,566	65–46
116	August 19	Phillies	5–3	**Roe** (10–9)	Gerheauser	—	3,327	66–46
117	August 20	Dodgers	10–7	**Butcher** (11–7)	Chapman	**Cuccurullo** (3)	—	67–46
118	August 20	Dodgers	7–1	**Strincevich** (10–6)	Wyatt	—	20,953	68–46
119	August 21	Dodgers	7–6 (10)	**Starr** (6–3)	Webber	—	3,039	69–46
120	August 22	Dodgers	7–5	**Sewell** (14–10)	Sunkel	—	19,444	70–46
121	August 25	@ Cardinals	0–4	Schmidt	**Roe** (10–10)	—	11,000	70–47
122	August 27	@ Cardinals	14–6	**Sewell** (15–10)	Lanier	—	—	71–47
123	August 27	@ Cardinals	1–1 (10)			—	10,676	71–47
124	August 29	@ Cubs	4–15	Derringer	**Butcher** (11–8)	—	—	71–48
125	August 29	@ Cubs	5–4	**Roe** (11–10)	Passeau	—	11,649	72–48
126	August 30	@ Cubs	5–12	Wyse	**Sewell** (15–11)	Lynn	—	72–49
127	August 30	@ Cubs	3–6	Passeau	**Starr** (6–4)	Wyse	17,438	72–50

September: 17–12 (Home: 6–5; Away: 11–7)

#	Date	Opponent	Score	Win	Loss	Save	Attendance	Record
128	September 1	Cardinals	3–2	**Ostermueller** (10–3)	Lanier	—	17,030	73–50
129	September 2	Cardinals	5–4	**Butcher** (12–8)	Wilks	—	5,864	74–50
130	September 3	Cardinals	6–5	**Sewell** (16–11)	Cooper	—	—	75–50
131	September 3	Cardinals	8–2	**Strincevich** (11–6)	Brecheen	—	34,395	76–50
132	September 4	Cubs	3–6	Erickson	**Butcher** (12–9)	—	—	76–51
133	September 4	Cubs	4–3 (6)	**Rescigno** (9–7)	Derringer	—	18,175	77–51
134	September 7	@ Reds	1–2	Heusser	**Ostermueller** (10–4)	—	4,702	77–52
135	September 9	@ Reds	2–3	Shoun	**Sewell** (16–12)	—	1,818	77–53
136	September 10	@ Reds	7–5	**Strincevich** (12–6)	Walters	—	—	78–53
137	September 10	@ Reds	0–2	Carter	**Butcher** (12–10)	—	17,343	78–54
138	September 12	@ Cardinals	5–3	**Ostermueller** (11–4)	Schmidt	—	—	79–54
139	September 12	@ Cardinals	6–5	**Roe** (12–10)	Byerly	**Starr** (2)	6,445	80–54
140	September 13	@ Cardinals	7–3	**Sewell** (17–12)	Brecheen	—	—	81–54
141	September 13	@ Cardinals	10–5	**Rescigno** (10–7)	Lanier	**Starr** (3)	6,495	82–54
142	September 15	Reds	3–5 (10)	Walters	**Rescigno** (10–8)	—	12,198	82–55
143	September 16	Reds	1–2	de la Cruz	**Butcher** (12–11)	—	—	82–56
144	September 16	Reds	1–3	Carter	**Starr** (6–5)	—	3,670	82–57
145	September 17	Reds	7–1	**Sewell** (18–12)	Shoun	—	—	83–57
146	September 17	Reds	1–2 (10)	Gumbert	**Ostermueller** (11–5)	—	19,823	83–58
147	September 20	@ Dodgers	2–1	**Strincevich** (13–6)	Wells	—	1,338	84–58
148	September 21	@ Dodgers	10–4	**Sewell** (19–12)	Gregg	—	—	85–58
149	September 21	@ Dodgers	14–6	**Roe** (13–10)	Zachary	—	2,579	86–58
150	September 23	@ Giants	6–4 (13)	**Sewell** (20–12)	Adams	**Cuccurullo** (4)	3,749	87–58
151	September 24	@ Giants	4–5	Voiselle	**Ostermueller** (11–6)	—	—	87–59
152	September 24	@ Giants	3–2 (10)	**Strincevich** (14–6)	Melton	—	17,778	88–59
153	September 25	@ Braves	4–5 (13)	Barrett	**Roe** (13–11)	—	463	88–60
154	September 26	@ Braves	6–2	**Butcher** (13–11)	Andrews	—	1,644	89–60
155	September 27	@ Braves	3–4	Javery	**Strincevich** (14–7)	Hutchings	655	89–61
156	September 29	@ Phillies	0–3	Raffensberger	**Ostermueller** (11–7)	—	1,000	89–62

October: 1–1 (Home: 0–0; Away: 1–1)

#	Date	Opponent	Score	Win	Loss	Save	Attendance	Record
157	October 1	@ Phillies	9–1	**Sewell** (21–12)	Schanz	—	—	90–62
158	October 1	@ Phillies	1–7	Barrett	**Gilmore** (0–1)	—	—	90–63

Legend: = Win = Loss = Tie
Bold = Pirates team member

=== All-Star Game ===
The Pirates hosted the 1944 Major League Baseball All-Star Game on July 11, 1944, at Forbes Field. Pitcher Rip Sewell, infielder Bob Elliott, and outfielder Vince DiMaggio were selected for the National League squad. Pirates pitchers Max Butcher and Cookie Cuccurullo were named the NL's batting practice pitchers and Pirates catcher Spud Davis was the NL's batting practice catcher. Honus Wagner was named an honorary coach, the first time this honor was bestowed in Major League Baseball's All-Star Game.

=== Roster ===
1944 Pittsburgh Pirates
**Roster**
**Pitchers**: 19 Max Butcher; 27 Cookie Cuccurullo; 26 Johnny Gee; -- Len Gilmore; 21 Fritz Ostermueller; 4 Xavier Rescigno; 29 Preacher Roe; 30 Rip Sewell; 20 Ray Starr; 22 Nick Strincevich; 25 Joe Vitelli; -- Roy Wise	**Catchers**: 10 Hank Camelli; 36 Spud Davis; 12 Al López; **Infielders**: -- Vic Barnhart; 5 Pete Coscarart; 7 Babe Dahlgren; 8 Bob Elliott; 16 Frankie Gustine; 6 Lee Handley; -- Hank Sweeney; 14 Frankie Zak	**Outfielders**: 18 Johnny Barrett; 23 Frank Colman; 9 Vince DiMaggio; -- Al Gionfriddo; 11 Tommy O'Brien; -- Bill Rodgers; 4 Al Rubeling; 32 Jim Russell; 15 Lloyd Waner; 14 Johnny Wyrostek	**Manager**: 35 Frankie Frisch; **Coaches**: 36 Spud Davis; 34 Jake Flowers; 33 Honus Wagner

== Player stats ==
= Indicates team leader

=== Batting ===
==== Starters by position ====
Note: Pos = Position; G = Games played; AB = At bats; H = Hits; Avg. = Batting average; HR = Home runs; RBI = Runs batted in

Pos	Player	G	AB	H	Avg.	HR	RBI
C	Al Lopez	115	331	76	.230	1	34
1B	Babe Dahlgren	158	599	173	.289	12	101
2B	Pete Coscarart	139	554	146	.264	4	42
SS	Frankie Gustine	127	405	93	.230	2	42
3B	Bob Elliott	143	538	160	.297	10	108
OF	Johnny Barrett	149	568	153	.269	7	83
OF	Vince DiMaggio	109	342	82	.240	9	50
OF	Jim Russell	152	580	181	.312	8	66

==== Other batters ====
Note: G = Games played; AB = At bats; H = Hits; Avg. = Batting average; HR = Home runs; RBI = Runs batted in

Player	G	AB	H	Avg.	HR	RBI
Frank Colman	99	226	61	.270	6	53
Al Rubeling	92	184	45	.245	4	30
Frankie Zak	87	160	48	.300	0	11
Tommy O'Brien	85	156	39	.250	3	20
Hank Camelli	63	125	37	.296	1	10
Spud Davis	54	93	28	.301	2	14
Lee Handley	40	86	19	.221	0	5
Lloyd Waner	19	14	5	.357	0	2
Al Gionfriddo	4	6	1	.167	0	0
Bill Rodgers	2	4	1	.250	0	0
Vic Barnhart	1	2	1	.500	0	0
Hank Sweeney	1	2	0	.000	0	0

=== Pitching ===
==== Starting pitchers ====
Note: G = Games pitched; IP = Innings pitched; W = Wins; L = Losses; ERA = Earned run average; SO = Strikeouts

Player	G	IP	W	L	ERA	SO
Rip Sewell	38	286.0	21	12	3.18	87
Fritz Ostermueller	28	204.2	11	7	2.73	80
Max Butcher	35	199.0	13	11	3.12	43
Len Gilmore	1	8.0	0	1	7.88	0

==== Other pitchers ====
Note: G = Games pitched; IP = Innings pitched; W = Wins; L = Losses; ERA = Earned run average; SO = Strikeouts

Player	G	IP	W	L	ERA	SO
Nick Strincevich	40	190.0	14	7	3.08	47
Preacher Roe	39	185.1	13	11	3.11	88
Ray Starr	27	89.2	6	5	5.02	25

==== Relief pitchers ====
Note: G = Games pitched; W = Wins; L = Losses; SV = Saves; ERA = Earned run average; SO = Strikeouts

Player	G	W	L	SV	ERA	SO
Xavier Rescigno	48	10	8	5	4.35	45
Cookie Cuccurullo	32	2	1	4	4.06	31
Johnny Gee	4	0	0	0	7.15	3
Joe Vitelli	4	0	0	0	2.57	2
Roy Wise	3	0	0	0	9.00	1

== Farm system ==
Level	Team	League	Manager
AA	Toronto Maple Leafs	International League	Burleigh Grimes
A	Albany Senators	Eastern League	Ripper Collins
B	York White Roses	Interstate League	Bunny Griffiths
D	Hornell Maples	PONY League	Dutch Schleser, Fred Hering, Frank Pareman and John Morrow
