= 1945 Pittsburgh Pirates season =

64th season of baseball team Pittsburgh Pirates

1945 Pittsburgh Pirates
- League: National League
- Ballpark: Forbes Field
- City: Pittsburgh, Pennsylvania
- Owners: Bill Benswanger
- Managers: Frankie Frisch
- Radio: WWSW; Rosey Rowswell, Jack Craddock

The 1945 Pittsburgh Pirates season was the 64th season of the Pittsburgh Pirates franchise and their 59th in the National League. The Pirates finished fourth in the league standings with a record of 82–72.

== Offseason ==
- Prior to 1945 season: Tod Davis was acquired by the Pirates from the Hollywood Stars as part of a minor league working agreement.

== Regular season ==
=== Season standings ===
National League
Team	W	L	Pct.	GB	Home	Road
Chicago Cubs	98	56	.636	—	49‍–‍26	49‍–‍30
St. Louis Cardinals	95	59	.617	3	48‍–‍29	47‍–‍30
Brooklyn Dodgers	87	67	.565	11	48‍–‍30	39‍–‍37
Pittsburgh Pirates	82	72	.532	16	45‍–‍34	37‍–‍38
New York Giants	78	74	.513	19	47‍–‍30	31‍–‍44
Boston Braves	67	85	.441	30	36‍–‍38	31‍–‍47
Cincinnati Reds	61	93	.396	37	36‍–‍41	25‍–‍52
Philadelphia Phillies	46	108	.299	52	22‍–‍55	24‍–‍53

=== Record vs. opponents ===
1945 National League record Sources:
Team	BSN	BRO	CHC	CIN	NYG	PHI	PIT	STL
Boston	—	9–13–1	7–15	10–12	10–10–2	14–8	7–15	10–12
Brooklyn	13–9–1	—	8–14–1	11–11	15–7	19–3	12–10	9–13
Chicago	15–7	14–8–1	—	21–1	11–11	17–5	14–8	6–16
Cincinnati	12–10	11–11	1–21	—	6–16	12–10	10–12	9–13
New York	10–10–2	7–15	11–11	16–6	—	17–5	11–11	6–16
Philadelphia	8–14	3–19	5–17	10–12	5–17	—	6–16	9–13
Pittsburgh	15–7	10–12	8–14	12–10	11–11	16–6	—	10–12–1
St. Louis	12–10	13–9	16–6	13–9	16–6	13–9	12–10–1	—

=== Game log ===
1945 Game Log: 82–72 (Home: 45–34; Away: 37–38)
April: 4–7 (Home: 1–3; Away: 3–4)

#	Date	Opponent	Score	Win	Loss	Save	Attendance	Record
1	April 17	@ Reds	6–7 (11)	Lisenbee	**Sewell** (0–1)	—	30,126	0–1
2	April 18	@ Reds	0–6	Heusser	**Strincevich** (0–1)	—	1,467	0–2
3	April 19	@ Reds	5–1	**Butcher** (1–0)	Beck	—	1,106	1–2
4	April 20	Cubs	5–4	**Sewell** (1–1)	Wyse	—	9,449	2–2
5	April 21	Cubs	3–4	Derringer	**Roe** (0–1)	—	3,891	2–3
6	April 22	Cubs	0–3	Chipman	**Ostermueller** (0–1)	—	—	2–4
7	April 22	Cubs	2–5	Prim	**Gerheauser** (0–1)	—	27,690	2–5
8	April 27	@ Cubs	3–7	Derringer	**Sewell** (1–2)	—	4,655	2–6
9	April 28	@ Cubs	0–6	Wyse	**Butcher** (1–1)	—	5,708	2–7
10	April 29	@ Cubs	6–2	**Roe** (1–1)	Chipman	—	—	3–7
11	April 29	@ Cubs	5–4	**Strincevich** (1–1)	Comellas	**Rescigno** (1)	36,637	4–7

May: 15–9 (Home: 10–4; Away: 5–5)

#	Date	Opponent	Score	Win	Loss	Save	Attendance	Record
12	May 2	Cardinals	2–4	Brecheen	**Sewell** (1–3)	—	6,000	4–8
13	May 2	Cardinals	11–1	**Butcher** (2–1)	Donnelly	—	6,159	5–8
14	May 6	Reds	1–3	Heusser	**Butcher** (2–2)	—	—	5–9
15	May 6	Reds	5–1	**Sewell** (2–3)	Walters	—	10,157	6–9
16	May 9	@ Braves	9–5	**Roe** (2–1)	Tobin	**Rescigno** (2)	2,574	7–9
17	May 12	@ Phillies	5–3	**Strincevich** (2–1)	Barrett	**Rescigno** (3)	2,693	8–9
18	May 13	@ Phillies	9–6	**Sewell** (3–3)	Schanz	—	—	9–9
19	May 13	@ Phillies	5–6	Lee	**Starr** (0–1)	Sproull	10,402	9–10
20	May 14	@ Dodgers	1–4	Pfund	**Roe** (2–2)	—	7,343	9–11
21	May 15	@ Dodgers	3–6	Lombardi	**Cuccurullo** (0–1)	—	25,828	9–12
22	May 16	@ Dodgers	1–3	Gregg	**Gerheauser** (0–2)	—	7,352	9–13
23	May 17	@ Dodgers	12–3	**Strincevich** (3–1)	Seats	—	6,575	10–13
24	May 20	@ Giants	1–5	Voiselle	**Sewell** (3–4)	—	—	10–14
25	May 20	@ Giants	4–0	**Roe** (3–2)	Feldman	—	—	11–14
26	May 21	Giants	5–2	**Butcher** (3–2)	Hansen	—	21,682	12–14
27	May 23	Braves	9–8 (13)	**Sewell** (4–4)	Hutchings	—	10,106	13–14
28	May 24	Braves	10–9 (11)	**Gables** (1–0)	Logan	—	—	14–14
29	May 25	Braves	5–3	**Roe** (4–2)	Tobin	—	2,768	15–14
30	May 27	Giants	16–4	**Sewell** (5–4)	Voiselle	—	—	16–14
31	May 27	Giants	11–5	**Rescigno** (1–0)	Fischer	—	29,121	17–14
32	May 29	Giants	4–3	**Gables** (2–0)	Adams	—	—	18–14
33	May 30	Dodgers	13–5	**Sewell** (6–4)	Seats	—	—	19–14
34	May 30	Dodgers	10–14	Pfund	**Rescigno** (1–1)	Gregg	27,029	19–15
35	May 31	Dodgers	4–6 (13)	King	**Strincevich** (3–2)	—	13,126	19–16

June: 14–15 (Home: 8–7; Away: 6–8)

#	Date	Opponent	Score	Win	Loss	Save	Attendance	Record
36	June 1	Phillies	6–5	**Butcher** (4–2)	Karl	—	1,513	20–16
37	June 2	Phillies	7–6	**Gerheauser** (1–2)	Coffman	**Rescigno** (4)	2,695	21–16
38	June 3	Phillies	7–6 (10)	**Cuccurullo** (1–1)	Judd	—	—	22–16
39	June 3	Phillies	9–11	Karl	**Cuccurullo** (1–2)	—	9,086	22–17
40	June 5	Reds	0–4	Heusser	**Strincevich** (3–3)	—	—	22–18
41	June 5	Reds	9–1	**Butcher** (5–2)	Beck	—	2,634	23–18
42	June 6	Reds	0–3	Walters	**Roe** (4–3)	—	13,277	23–19
43	June 7	Reds	3–7	Bowman	**Sewell** (6–5)	—	2,954	23–20
44	June 8	@ Cardinals	3–4 (13)	Burkhart	**Gerheauser** (1–3)	—	3,695	23–21
45	June 9	@ Cardinals	5–1	**Strincevich** (4–3)	Barrett	—	5,195	24–21
46	June 10	@ Cardinals	8–6 (10)	**Sewell** (7–5)	Brecheen	—	—	25–21
47	June 10	@ Cardinals	4–1 (10)	**Roe** (5–3)	Burkhart	—	13,794	26–21
48	June 12	Cubs	9–3	**Gerheauser** (2–3)	Wyse	—	15,126	27–21
49	June 14	Cubs	5–2	**Butcher** (6–2)	Chipman	—	—	28–21
50	June 14	Cubs	6–5	**Sewell** (8–5)	Derringer	**Rescigno** (5)	12,880	29–21
51	June 15	Cardinals	5–2	**Strincevich** (5–3)	Barrett	—	24,315	30–21
52	June 16	Cardinals	10–13	Byerly	**Starr** (0–2)	Donnelly	6,019	30–22
53	June 17	Cardinals	0–7	Burkhart	**Sewell** (8–6)	—	—	30–23
54	June 17	Cardinals	2–6	Wilks	**Gerheauser** (2–4)	—	—	30–24
55	June 20	@ Cubs	3–5	Passeau	**Butcher** (6–3)	—	—	30–25
56	June 21	@ Cubs	4–5	Wyse	**Roe** (5–4)	—	10,123	30–26
57	June 22	@ Reds	3–1	**Strincevich** (6–3)	Heusser	—	5,814	31–26
58	June 24	@ Reds	7–5	**Sewell** (9–6)	Riddle	**Strincevich** (1)	—	32–26
59	June 24	@ Reds	3–4	Bowman	**Butcher** (6–4)	—	11,732	32–27
60	June 27	@ Giants	4–10	Mungo	**Gerheauser** (2–5)	—	—	32–28
61	June 27	@ Giants	2–3	Brewer	**Roe** (5–5)	—	17,735	32–29
62	June 28	@ Giants	3–1	**Strincevich** (7–3)	Feldman	—	22,321	33–29
63	June 29	@ Giants	2–3	Adams	**Butcher** (6–5)	—	3,779	33–30
64	June 30	@ Dodgers	5–8	Herring	**Sewell** (9–7)	King	23,736	33–31

July: 16–15 (Home: 11–5; Away: 5–10)

#	Date	Opponent	Score	Win	Loss	Save	Attendance	Record
65	July 1	@ Dodgers	4–3	**Roe** (6–5)	Gregg	**Cuccurullo** (1)	—	34–31
66	July 1	@ Dodgers	2–4	Davis	**Gerheauser** (2–6)	—	23,370	34–32
67	July 3	@ Phillies	10–3	**Strincevich** (8–3)	Barrett	—	—	35–32
68	July 4	@ Phillies	6–7	Kraus	**Rescigno** (1–2)	Schanz	—	35–33
69	July 4	@ Phillies	13–0	**Butcher** (7–5)	Judd	—	14,334	36–33
70	July 6	@ Braves	5–13	Andrews	**Rescigno** (1–3)	Cooper	—	36–34
71	July 6	@ Braves	8–14	Hendrickson	**Roe** (6–6)	—	8,025	36–35
72	July 7	@ Braves	6–7	Cooper	**Gerheauser** (2–7)	—	5,159	36–36
73	July 8	@ Braves	10–8	**Gables** (3–0)	Andrews	**Sewell** (1)	—	37–36
74	July 8	@ Braves	1–13	Tobin	**Butcher** (7–6)	—	25,317	37–37
75	July 12	Phillies	4–0	**Strincevich** (9–3)	Kraus	—	15,044	38–37
76	July 13	Phillies	3–2 (10)	**Butcher** (8–6)	Barrett	—	3,660	39–37
77	July 15	Dodgers	9–1	**Sewell** (10–7)	Lombardi	—	—	40–37
78	July 15	Dodgers	15–3	**Gables** (4–0)	Gregg	—	24,129	41–37
79	July 16	Dodgers	4–8	Seats	**Rescigno** (1–4)	—	3,162	41–38
80	July 17	Dodgers	2–5	Gregg	**Strincevich** (9–4)	Herring	20,148	41–39
81	July 18	Giants	3–6	Brewer	**Roe** (6–7)	Adams	—	41–40
82	July 18	Giants	3–4	Fischer	**Butcher** (8–7)	Adams	6,253	41–41
83	July 19	Giants	4–0	**Sewell** (11–7)	Feldman	—	14,168	42–41
84	July 20	Giants	13–5	**Beck** (1–0)	Voiselle	**Roe** (1)	3,210	43–41
85	July 21	Braves	1–5	Lee	**Gerheauser** (2–8)	—	—	43–42
86	July 21	Braves	3–1	**Strincevich** (10–4)	Logan	—	8,173	44–42
87	July 22	Braves	2–1	**Gables** (5–0)	Tobin	—	—	45–42
88	July 22	Braves	3–1	**Roe** (7–7)	Andrews	—	19,184	46–42
89	July 23	Braves	8–5	**Beck** (2–0)	Hutchings	**Strincevich** (2)	3,163	47–42
90	July 24	Braves	6–5 (11)	**Gables** (6–0)	Hendrickson	—	20,168	48–42
91	July 26	@ Cardinals	2–10	Burkhart	**Strincevich** (10–5)	—	9,213	48–43
92	July 27	@ Cardinals	0–2	Donnelly	**Roe** (7–8)	—	4,948	48–44
93	July 28	@ Cardinals	0–2	Barrett	**Gables** (6–1)	—	9,242	48–45
94	July 29	@ Cardinals	9–6 (10)	**Gerheauser** (3–8)	Barrett	—	—	49–45
95	July 29	@ Cardinals	4–6	Dockins	**Strincevich** (10–6)	—	15,971	49–46

August: 18–16 (Home: 5–7; Away: 13–9)

#	Date	Opponent	Score	Win	Loss	Save	Attendance	Record
96	August 1	@ Cubs	1–0	**Butcher** (9–7)	Passeau	—	17,780	50–46
97	August 2	@ Cubs	0–1	Derringer	**Roe** (7–9)	—	18,535	50–47
98	August 3	Cardinals	1–5	Dockins	**Gables** (6–2)	—	22,218	50–48
99	August 4	Cardinals	5–6	Brecheen	**Gerheauser** (3–9)	—	5,280	50–49
100	August 5	Cardinals	3–10	Barrett	**Butcher** (9–8)	—	—	50–50
101	August 5	Cardinals	12–5	**Ostermueller** (1–1)	Burkhart	**Gables** (1)	22,105	51–50
102	August 8	@ Phillies	4–0	**Roe** (8–9)	Kraus	—	—	52–50
103	August 8	@ Phillies	0–5	Mauney	**Cuccurullo** (1–3)	—	6,630	52–51
104	August 9	@ Phillies	3–1	**Gables** (7–2)	Barrett	—	5,017	53–51
105	August 10	@ Phillies	10–2	**Ostermueller** (2–1)	Schanz	—	—	54–51
106	August 10	@ Phillies	1–6	Judd	**Strincevich** (10–7)	—	5,728	54–52
107	August 12	@ Braves	6–7	Hendrickson	**Gerheauser** (3–10)	—	—	54–53
108	August 12	@ Braves	3–0	**Roe** (9–9)	Wright	—	14,961	55–53
109	August 13	@ Braves	4–6	Andrews	**Gables** (7–3)	Hendrickson	2,095	55–54
110	August 14	@ Braves	7–5 (10)	**Ostermueller** (3–1)	Hendrickson	—	—	56–54
111	August 14	@ Braves	6–2	**Beck** (3–0)	Javery	—	4,542	57–54
112	August 15	@ Giants	11–9	**Gables** (8–3)	Feldman	**Gerheauser** (1)	—	58–54
113	August 15	@ Giants	3–2	**Strincevich** (11–7)	Zabala	—	18,822	59–54
114	August 16	@ Giants	1–2	Mungo	**Roe** (9–10)	Adams	22,807	59–55
115	August 17	@ Giants	2–3	Brewer	**Gables** (8–4)	—	3,834	59–56
116	August 18	@ Giants	0–6	Maglie	**Rescigno** (1–5)	—	10,126	59–57
117	August 19	@ Dodgers	2–6	Webber	**Ostermueller** (3–2)	—	—	59–58
118	August 19	@ Dodgers	4–2	**Strincevich** (12–7)	Branca	—	19,422	60–58
119	August 20	@ Dodgers	11–1	**Roe** (10–10)	Seats	—	6,322	61–58
120	August 21	@ Dodgers	12–1	**Gables** (9–4)	Gregg	—	5,484	62–58
121	August 23	Reds	6–2	**Beck** (4–0)	Harrist	—	1,567	63–58
122	August 24	Reds	1–2	Heusser	**Strincevich** (12–8)	—	12,923	63–59
123	August 25	Reds	0–1	Kennedy	**Roe** (10–11)	—	3,402	63–60
124	August 26	Reds	10–7	**Rescigno** (2–5)	Fox	—	527	64–60
125	August 26	Reds	2–1	**Gables** (10–4)	Bowman	—	14,193	65–60
126	August 28	Cubs	3–6	Borowy	**Ostermueller** (3–3)	—	23,335	65–61
127	August 29	Cubs	0–2	Prim	**Strincevich** (12–9)	Vandenberg	4,881	65–62
128	August 30	Cubs	6–4	**Roe** (11–11)	Erickson	**Rescigno** (6)	—	66–62
129	August 31	@ Reds	6–5	**Gables** (11–4)	Bowman	**Rescigno** (7)	4,499	67–62

September: 15–10 (Home: 10–8; Away: 5–2)

#	Date	Opponent	Score	Win	Loss	Save	Attendance	Record
130	September 2	@ Reds	4–2	**Beck** (5–0)	Bowman	—	—	68–62
131	September 2	@ Reds	7–3	**Strincevich** (13–9)	Walters	—	9,810	69–62
132	September 3	@ Cardinals	6–5	**Ostermueller** (4–3)	Wilks	**Rescigno** (8)	—	70–62
133	September 3	@ Cardinals	6–2	**Roe** (12–11)	Donnelly	—	19,492	71–62
134	September 4	@ Cardinals	8–8 (12)			—	1,755	71–62
135	September 5	Dodgers	3–5 (10)	Lombardi	**Gables** (11–5)	—	19,504	71–63
136	September 6	Dodgers	17–5	**Strincevich** (14–9)	Gregg	—	1,885	72–63
137	September 7	Dodgers	2–3	Seats	**Roe** (12–12)	Herring	1,874	72–64
138	September 8	Dodgers	6–5 (12)	**Gerheauser** (4–10)	King	—	3,550	73–64
139	September 9	Phillies	4–3	**Beck** (6–0)	Kraus	—	—	74–64
140	September 9	Phillies	3–14	Mauney	**Sewell** (11–8)	Karl	5,525	74–65
141	September 10	Phillies	9–5 (7)	**Strincevich** (15–9)	Leon	—	6,000	75–65
142	September 11	Phillies	5–4 (10)	**Rescigno** (3–5)	Schanz	—	—	76–65
143	September 11	Phillies	5–1	**Butcher** (10–8)	Sproull	**Rescigno** (9)	2,047	77–65
144	September 13	Braves	4–3	**Gerheauser** (5–10)	Singleton	—	—	78–65
145	September 13	Braves	2–0	**Ostermueller** (5–3)	Whitcher	—	3,836	79–65
146	September 15	Giants	5–9	Zabala	**Strincevich** (15–10)	—	411	79–66
147	September 16	Giants	3–2	**Roe** (13–12)	Maglie	—	—	80–66
148	September 16	Giants	2–9	Brewer	**Gables** (11–6)	—	15,175	80–67
149	September 23	@ Cubs	3–7	Wyse	**Roe** (13–13)	—	43,755	80–68
150	September 26	@ Reds	2–5	Hetki	**Beck** (6–1)	—	—	80–69
151	September 26	@ Reds	2–1	**Strincevich** (16–10)	Harrist	—	715	81–69
152	September 27	Cardinals	5–2	**Roe** (14–13)	Dockins	—	9,603	82–69
153	September 29	Cubs	3–4	Borowy	**Ostermueller** (5–4)	Erickson	—	82–70
154	September 29	Cubs	0–5 (7)	Vandenberg	**Sewell** (11–9)	Warneke	4,016	82–71
155	September 30	Cubs	3–5	Chipman	**Gables** (11–7)	Erickson	3,751	82–72

Legend: = Win = Loss = Tie
Bold = Pirates team member

=== Roster ===
1945 Pittsburgh Pirates
**Roster**
**Pitchers**: 20 Boom-Boom Beck; 19 Max Butcher; 27 Cookie Cuccurullo; 45 Ken Gables; 40 Al Gerheauser; 25 Johnny Lanning; 21 Fritz Ostermueller; 4 Xavier Rescigno; 29 Preacher Roe; 30 Rip Sewell; 20 Ray Starr; 22 Nick Strincevich	**Catchers**: 2 Hank Camelli; 36 Spud Davis; 12 Al López; 1 Bill Salkeld; **Infielders**: 17 Vic Barnhart; 23 Frank Colman; 5 Pete Coscarart; 7 Babe Dahlgren; 8 Bob Elliott; 16 Frankie Gustine; 6 Lee Handley; 4 Jack Saltzgaver; 14 Frankie Zak	**Outfielders**: 18 Johnny Barrett; 3 Al Gionfriddo; 11 Tommy O'Brien; 32 Jim Russell; 15 Lloyd Waner; **Other batters**: 4 Bill Rodgers; 25 Joe Vitelli	**Manager**: 35 Frankie Frisch; **Coaches**: 36 Spud Davis; 34 Jake Flowers; 33 Honus Wagner

== Player stats ==
=== Batting ===
==== Starters by position ====
Note: Pos = Position; G = Games played; AB = At bats; H = Hits; Avg. = Batting average; HR = Home runs; RBI = Runs batted in

Pos	Player	G	AB	H	Avg.	HR	RBI
C	Al López	91	243	53	.218	0	18
1B	Babe Dahlgren	144	531	133	.250	5	75
2B	Pete Coscarart	123	392	95	.242	8	38
SS	Frankie Gustine	128	478	134	.280	2	66
3B	Bob Elliott	144	541	157	.290	8	108
OF	Johnny Barrett	142	507	130	.256	15	67
OF	Al Gionfriddo	122	409	116	.284	2	42
OF	Jim Russell	146	510	145	.284	12	77

==== Other batters ====
Note: G = Games played; AB = At bats; H = Hits; Avg. = Batting average; HR = Home runs; RBI = Runs batted in

Player	G	AB	H	Avg.	HR	RBI
Lee Handley	98	312	93	.298	1	32
Bill Salkeld	95	267	83	.311	15	52
Vic Barnhart	71	201	54	.269	0	19
Tommy O'Brien	58	161	54	.335	0	18
Frank Colman	77	153	32	.209	4	30
Jack Saltzgaver	52	117	38	.325	0	10
Spud Davis	23	33	8	.242	0	6
Frankie Zak	15	28	4	.143	0	3
Lloyd Waner	23	19	5	.263	0	1
Hank Camelli	1	2	0	.000	0	0
Bill Rodgers	1	1	1	1.000	0	0
Joe Vitelli	1	0	0	----	0	0

=== Pitching ===
==== Starting pitchers ====
Note: G = Games pitched; IP = Innings pitched; W = Wins; L = Losses; ERA = Earned run average; SO = Strikeouts

Player	G	IP	W	L	ERA	SO
Preacher Roe	33	235.0	14	13	2.87	148
Nick Strincevich	36	228.1	16	10	3.31	74
Rip Sewell	33	188.0	11	9	4.07	60
Max Butcher	28	169.1	10	8	3.03	37
Fritz Ostermueller	14	80.2	5	4	4.57	29

==== Other pitchers ====
Note: G = Games pitched; IP = Innings pitched; W = Wins; L = Losses; ERA = Earned run average; SO = Strikeouts

Player	G	IP	W	L	ERA	SO
Al Gerheauser	32	140.1	5	10	3.91	55
Ken Gables	29	138.2	11	7	4.15	49
Boom-Boom Beck	14	63.0	6	1	2.14	20

==== Relief pitchers ====
Note: G = Games pitched; W = Wins; L = Losses; SV = Saves; ERA = Earned run average; SO = Strikeouts

Player	G	W	L	SV	ERA	SO
Xavier Rescigno	44	3	5	9	5.72	29
Cookie Cuccurullo	29	1	3	1	5.24	17
Ray Starr	4	0	2	0	9.45	0
Johnny Lanning	1	0	0	0	36.00	0

== Farm system ==
Level	Team	League	Manager
AA	Hollywood Stars	Pacific Coast League	Buck Fausett
A	Albany Senators	Eastern League	Ripper Collins
B	York White Roses	Interstate League	Bunny Griffiths
D	Salisbury Pirates	North Carolina State League	Tuck McWilliams
D	Hornell Pirates	PONY League	John Morrow and Fred Hering

LEAGUE CHAMPIONS: Albany
