= 1922 in baseball =

The following are the baseball events of the year 1922 throughout the world.

== Champions ==
- World Series: New York Giants over New York Yankees (4–0–1)

== Statistical leaders ==
	American League		National League		Negro National League	
Stat	Player	Total	Player	Total	Player	Total
AVG	George Sisler (SLB)	.420	Rogers Hornsby^{1} (STL)	.401	Heavy Johnson (KCM)	.406
HR	Ken Williams (SLB)	39	Rogers Hornsby^{1} (STL)	42	Oscar Charleston (ABC)	19
RBI	Ken Williams (SLB)	155	Rogers Hornsby^{1} (STL)	152	Oscar Charleston (ABC)	102
W	Eddie Rommel (PHA)	27	Eppa Rixey (CIN)	25	Jim Jeffries (ABC)	21
ERA	Red Faber (CWS)	2.81	Phil Douglas (NYG)	2.63	Lewis Hampton (ABC)	2.49
K	Urban Shocker (SLB)	149	Dazzy Vance (BRO)	134	Bill Force (DTS)	120

^{1} National League Triple Crown batting winner

== Major league baseball final standings ==
=== American League final standings ===
American League
Team	W	L	Pct.	GB	Home	Road
New York Yankees	94	60	.610	—	50‍–‍27	44‍–‍33
St. Louis Browns	93	61	.604	1	54‍–‍23	39‍–‍38
Detroit Tigers	79	75	.513	15	43‍–‍34	36‍–‍41
Cleveland Indians	78	76	.506	16	44‍–‍35	34‍–‍41
Chicago White Sox	77	77	.500	17	43‍–‍34	34‍–‍43
Washington Senators	69	85	.448	25	40‍–‍39	29‍–‍46
Philadelphia Athletics	65	89	.422	29	38‍–‍39	27‍–‍50
Boston Red Sox	61	93	.396	33	31‍–‍42	30‍–‍51

Locations of teams for the 1915–1922 American League seasons
American League

=== National League final standings ===
National League
Team	W	L	Pct.	GB	Home	Road
New York Giants	93	61	.604	—	51‍–‍27	42‍–‍34
Cincinnati Reds	86	68	.558	7	48‍–‍29	38‍–‍39
St. Louis Cardinals	85	69	.552	8	42‍–‍35	43‍–‍34
Pittsburgh Pirates	85	69	.552	8	45‍–‍33	40‍–‍36
Chicago Cubs	80	74	.519	13	39‍–‍37	41‍–‍37
Brooklyn Robins	76	78	.494	17	44‍–‍34	32‍–‍44
Philadelphia Phillies	57	96	.373	35½	35‍–‍41	22‍–‍55
Boston Braves	53	100	.346	39½	32‍–‍43	21‍–‍57

Locations of teams for the 1920–1931 National League seasons
National League

== Negro leagues final standings ==
All Negro leagues standings below are per MLB and Seamheads.

=== Negro National League final standings ===
This was the third of twelve seasons of the first Negro National League. Generally, teams did not play a uniform number of games (since some teams barnstormed against other Negro baseball teams). This sometimes created a difference in who would generally be considered first place in certain years. Playoffs would not be held to determine a winner until 1925 (for which it would be used five times until 1930). For example, Indianapolis played the most games with 85, followed by Kansas City at 80, Detroit with 75, and Chicago with 62. The latter team with its superior winning percentage among the group is generally considered the pennant winner.

vs. Negro National League						vs. Major Black teams			
Negro National League	W	L	T	Pct.	GB	W	L	T	Pct.
Chicago American Giants	38	23	1	.621	½	46	30	1	.604
Indianapolis ABCs	48	32	1	.599	—	63	42	2	.598
Kansas City Monarchs	47	32	2	.593	½	50	34	2	.593
Detroit Stars	41	33	1	.553	4	49	36	1	.576
St. Louis Stars	27	35	0	.435	12	30	37	0	.448
Cleveland Tate Stars	15	24	1	.388	12½	25	35	3	.421
Pittsburgh Keystones	12	24	2	.342	14	14	29	3	.337
Cuban Stars (West)	16	41	0	.281	20½	18	43	0	.295

Locations of teams for the 1922 Negro National League season
Negro National League
Traveling team: Cuban Stars

=== East (independent teams) final standings ===
A loose confederation of teams were gathered in the East to compete with the West, however East teams did not organize a formal league as the West did.

vs. All Teams
Independent Clubs	W	L	T	Pct.	GB
Homestead Grays	3	0	1	.875	6
Richmond Giants	32	17	4	.642	—
Brooklyn Royal Giants	6	4	0	.600	6½
Cuban Stars (East)	10	9	2	.524	7
New York Lincoln Giants	9	9	3	.500	7½
Baltimore Black Sox	25	26	1	.490	8
New York Bacharach Giants	30	37	1	.449	10½
Hilldale Club	20	27	1	.427	11
Original Bacharach Giants	10	14	2	.423	9½
Philadelphia Royal Stars	3	8	1	.292	10
Harrisburg Giants	2	8	0	.200	10½

== Events ==
=== January ===
- January 13 – Former Chicago White Sox infielder Buck Weaver files his first application for reinstatement to major league baseball. This would be one of six unsuccessful attempts Weaver would make to have the lifetime banishment lifted.
- January 14 – The Washington Senators name Clyde Milan, and outfielder and member of the team since 1907, as the new manager, replacing George McBride.
- January 30 – José Leblanc, a pitcher with the Negro National League's Cuban Stars, is struck on the head with a baseball bat in an argument with Antonio Susini, during a Cuban League game. Leblanc dies the following day.

=== March ===
- March 5 – Babe Ruth and the New York Yankees agree to a deal that pays the slugger $52,000 annually. The deal is worth more than that of teammate Frank "Home Run" Baker.
- March 9 – The St. Louis Cardinals sign Rogers Hornsby to a three-year contract. Hornsby had been contacted by John McGraw of the New York Giants, but Hornsby opted to sign with St. Louis.

=== April ===
- April 9 – With a St. Louis record crowd of 29,000 on hand, the Browns top the Cardinals, 6–3, to win their City Series.
- April 12 – The Chicago Cubs win their season opener 7–3 over the Cincinnati Reds. Hall of Fame catcher Gabby Hartnett debuts behind the plate for the Cubs.
- April 18 – St. Louis Cardinals pitcher Sid Benton faces two batters in the Cards' 7–5 loss to the Chicago Cubs, and walks both. It is his only major league experience ever.
- April 22 – Ken Williams of the St. Louis Browns hits three home runs in a single game, all of which scored George Sisler. Williams becomes the first American League player to hit three homers in a game as St. Louis defeated Chicago 10–7.
- April 28 – The Philadelphia Phillies defeat Brooklyn 10–7. In the game, Lee King of Philadelphia drives in seven runs. It's King's best output of the season as he finished the year with 15 runs batted in.
- April 29 – George Kelly, Ross Youngs and Dave Bancroft of the New York Giants each hit inside-the-park home runs, with Kelly accounting for two. The Giants defeated the Boston Braves 15–4 in the contest.
- April 30 – In his fourth career start, Chicago White Sox pitcher Charlie Robertson pitches the fifth perfect game in Major League history. Chicago tops the Detroit Tigers, 2–0, at Navin Field in Detroit.

=== May ===
- May 7 – Jesse Barnes of the New York Giants pitches a no-hitter in a 6–0 win over the Philadelphia Phillies.
  - Walter Mueller makes his major league debut, driving in five runs as the Pittsburgh Pirates defeated the Chicago Cubs 11–5. Mueller becomes the first player in major history to drive in five runs in his MLB debut.
- May 20 – Babe Ruth joins the New York Yankees after having been suspended for an illegal barnstorming tour the previous fall.
- May 25 – Ruth, having just returned to the Yankees, is called out trying to stretch a single into a double. An irate Ruth throws dirt into the eyes of the umpire. Ruth then enters the stands to fight a man that had been heckling him. After they are separated, Ruth begins yelling at the entire crowd. His antics cause him to be suspended for one game, and he is fined $200. A decision is also made to strip Ruth of his standing as team captain as well.
- May 29 – The United States Supreme Court decides Federal Baseball Club v. National League, a lawsuit resulting from the Federal League merger in 1915, holding that Major League Baseball games did not constitute interstate commerce and thus were exempt from the Sherman Antitrust Act.
- May 30 – One of the strangest trades in baseball history occurs between the St. Louis Cardinals and Chicago Cubs. The teams are playing each other in a double-header, when at the conclusion of the first game, Chicago trades outfielder Cliff Heathcote to St. Louis for outfielder Max Flack. Both players got a hit for their team in the second game, won by the Cubs as part of a sweep.

=== June ===
- June 3 – During a 5–4 win over the visiting Detroit Tigers at League Park, Cleveland Indians first baseman Stuffy McInnis committed his first error in an astounding 163 games played and 1,625 total chances.
- June 5 – In the only game on the Major League schedule, sloppy play by the St. Louis Cardinals is the difference in the Boston Braves' 6–0 victory. An error by Cardinals first baseman Jack Fournier leads to two unearned runs in the second. With two outs in the third, Jeff Pfeffer walks one, then gives up consecutive singles for Boston's third run. Hod Ford's single to center drives in a fourth run, followed by an error by center fielder Jack Smith, leading to a fifth run. Fournier commits a second error in the fifth which leads to Boston's sixth, and final, run.
- June 12 – Hub Pruett struck out Babe Ruth three consecutive times as the St. Louis Browns beat the New York Yankees 7–1.

=== July ===
- July 6 – The New York Yankees pound the Cleveland Indians in both games of a doubleheader by scores of 10–3 and 11–3. Babe Ruth drives in four runs in the first game, and is held hitless in the second.
- July 12 – the Cleveland Indians defeat the Boston Red Sox 11–7, with all 20 of the Indians' hits being singles.
- July 13:
  - Bill Doak of the St. Louis Cardinals loses a no-hit bid when he fails to cover first base. Curt Walker of Philadelphia hit a grounder to Cardinals first baseman Jack Fournier who could not reach the base quick enough to tag out Walker.
  - The Boston Red Sox defeat the St. Louis Browns 2–0 in front of only 68 spectators, which is the smallest crowd in the history of Fenway Park.
- July 23:
  - Chicago Cubs first baseman Ray Grimes drives in two runs in a 4–1 victory over the Brooklyn Robins, giving him at least one RBI in seventeen straight games.
  - Wally Pipp, Everett Scott and Mike McNally of the New York Yankees each get three hits in a game as the New York Yankees defeat the Boston Red Sox 11–7.

=== August ===
- August 6 – Washington Senators pitcher Walter Johnson gives up the first grand slam of his career, a third-inning shot by Jack Tobin, as the host St. Louis Browns top the Senators, 8–4. George Sisler is two-for-two against Johnson, as Browns pitcher Urban Shocker is credited with the victory.
- August 15 – The Chicago White Sox defeated the Boston Red Sox at Fenway Park, 19–11, in a game which both teams combined for a whopping 35 singles. Chicago collected 21 singles, Boston 14, to set an American League record that's still intact.
- August 18 – The St. Louis Cardinals defeat the Philadelphia Phillies 3–2 in fourteen innings. Future Hall of Famer Jim Bottomley makes his major league debut for the Cardinals playing all fourteen innings.
- August 25:
  - In the first game of a double header, New York Yankees pitcher Waite Hoyt holds St. Louis Browns slugger Ken Williams hitless, snapping his 28-game hitting streak. The Browns win regardless, 3–1.
  - The Chicago Cubs managed to edge out the Philadelphia Phillies, 26–23, in one of the worst combined pitching performances in Major League Baseball history. The game itself featured 51 hits, 23 bases on balls and 10 errors, with the Phillies leaving 16 runners stranded on base and the Cubs stranding nine.

=== September ===
- September 2–19 year old pitcher Paul Schreiber makes his major league debut for the Brooklyn Robins, giving up two hits over one inning. Schreiber would be sent back to the minors after the following season. He'd later emerge to pitch for the New York Yankees in 1945, coming out of retirement due to a shortage of players during the war, and appear in an MLB game 25 years after he'd played in his last one.
- September 9 – Baby Doll Jacobson hits three triples to lead the St. Louis Browns to a 16–0 win over the Detroit Tigers.
- September 16 – The St. Louis Browns open a crucial three game set against the New York Yankees at Sportsman's Park. The Yankees win game one of the series, 2–1, behind a strong pitching effort from Bob Shawkey.
- September 23 – Future Hall of Famer Kiki Cuyler makes his only appearance of the season in the Pittsburgh Pirates' 5–1 loss to the Brooklyn Robins.
- September 24 – Brothers Jesse and Virgil Barnes of the New York Giants surrender a home run to Rogers Hornsby. Hornsby would finish the season with a then record 42 homers.
- September 27 – Future Hall of famer Travis Jackson makes his Major league debut with the New York Giants, striking out in his only at-bat in the Giants' 3–2 victory over the Philadelphia Phillies.
- September 30 – Philadelphia Athletics pitcher Eddie Rommel gets his league leading 27th victory over the Washington Senators. Philadelphia only manage 65 victories all season, and finish in seventh place in the American League.

=== October ===
- October 1 – St. Louis Cardinals second baseman Rogers Hornsby goes three-for-five to end the season with a .401 batting average, becoming the first National Leaguer to end the season with a .400 average since 1901. Horsnby also sets new National League records with 42 home runs, 152 runs batted in, and a .722 slugging percentage.
- October 4 – For the second year in a row, every game of the World Series is played at the Polo Grounds in New York City since it houses both the Giants and Yankees. The Giants score three in the eighth inning to take game one, 3–2.
- October 5 – After ten innings, game two of the 1922 World Series is declared a 3–3 tie.
- October 6 – Behind a four hitter by Jack Scott, the Giants win game three of the World Series, 3–0.
- October 7 – A four run fifth inning carries the Giants to a 4–3 victory over the Yankees in game four of the World Series.
- October 8 – The New York Giants defeat the New York Yankees, 5–3, in Game five of the World Series, to win their second consecutive World Championship, and third overall, with a 4–0–1 record.

=== November ===
- November 1 – Former Philadelphia Athletics catcher Ira Thomas buys the Shreveport Gassers Texas League club for $75,000. Other former players who own pieces of minor league clubs include Ty Cobb (Augusta Georgians), Eddie Collins (Baltimore Orioles), and George Stallings (Rochester Red Wings).

=== December ===
- December 16 – The Eastern Colored League is formed. The league begins play in 1923, and ceased operations in 1928.

== Births ==
=== January ===
- January 2 – Viola Thompson
- January 3 – Virgil Stallcup
- January 5 – Helen Smith
- January 7 – Alvin Dark
- January 8 – Ralph LaPointe
- January 10 – Lefty Chambers
- January 11 – Neil Berry
- January 14 – Hank Biasatti
- January 17 – Jack Merson
- January 21 – Sam Mele
- January 22 – Annabelle Lee
- January 28 – Hank Arft
- January 30 – Mal Mallette

=== February ===
- February 2 – Sheldon Jones
- February 3 – Jim Dyck
- February 8 – Monty Basgall
- February 12 – Mike Clark
- February 12 – Woody Main
- February 18 – Joe Brovia
- February 18 – Joe Tipton
- February 18 – Connie Wisniewski (d. 1995)
- February 20 – Bill Reeder
- February 20 – Jim Wilson
- February 22 – Julie Dusanko
- February 22 – George Genovese
- February 22 – Frankie Zak
- February 26 – Steve Biras

=== March ===
- March 6 – Mary Moore
- March 8 – Carl Furillo
- March 8 – Al Gionfriddo
- March 10 – Sarah Mavis Dabbs
- March 13 – Cliff Mapes
- March 22 – Josephine Kabick
- March 22 – Claire Schillace
- March 25 – Billy Bowers

=== April ===
- April 5 – Gene Crumling
- April 6 – Elizabeth Fabac
- April 9 – Dizzy Sutherland
- April 12 – Bill Wight
- April 18 – Moe Burtschy
- April 26 – Sam Dente

=== May ===
- May 3 – Ernest Groth
- May 11 – Nestor Chylak
- May 11 – Thelma Eisen
- May 11 – Monte Kennedy
- May 12 – Johnny Hetki
- May 18 – Gil Coan
- May 18 – Sam File
- May 18 – Mike Modak
- May 30 – Leola Brody
- May 30 – Bob Hooper

=== June ===
- June 4 – Ray Coleman
- June 4 – Ross Grimsley
- June 7 – Idona Crigler
- June 12 – Jim Mains
- June 13 – June Gilmore
- June 13 – Mel Parnell
- June 14 – Bud Hardin
- June 16 – Max Surkont
- June 19 – George Burpo
- June 25 – Alex Garbowski
- June 29 – Kay Rohrer

=== July ===
- July 3 – Art Fowler
- July 3 – Howie Schultz
- July 4 – Loren Bain
- July 19 – Ray Yochim
- July 21 – Mickey Taborn
- July 23 – Mary Rountree
- July 24 – Duane Pillette
- July 26 – Hoyt Wilhelm
- July 30 – Joe Coleman
- July 31 – Hank Bauer

=== August ===
- August 2 – Marjorie Pieper
- August 7 – Bob Alexander
- August 10 – Clint Hartung
- August 11 – Cal Cooper
- August 11 – Bobby Wilkins
- August 12 – Irene DeLaby
- August 15 – Jim McDonnell
- August 16 – Gene Woodling
- August 23 – George Kell
- August 25 – Jim Devlin
- August 30 – Martha Rommelaere
- August 31 – Hub Andrews

=== September ===
- September 1 – Joe Astroth
- September 1 – Vic Barnhart
- September 3 – Morrie Martin
- September 6 – Lou Ciola
- September 6 – Harry Perkowski
- September 16 – Con Dempsey
- September 20 – Vic Lombardi
- September 23 – Lino Donoso
- September 29 – Don Wheeler
- September 30 – Barbara Liebrich

=== October ===
- October 1 – Takehiko Bessho
- October 2 – Jim Gladd
- October 3 – Jake Eisenhart
- October 4 – Don Lenhardt
- October 6 – Joe Frazier
- October 7 – Grady Hatton
- October 10 – Mickey Kreitner
- October 18 – Mildred Warwick
- October 21 – Stan Partenheimer
- October 23 – Ewell Blackwell
- October 27 – Ralph Kiner
- October 27 – Del Rice

=== November ===
- November 1 – Andy Lapihuska
- November 4 – Eddie Basinski
- November 6 – Vivian Kellogg
- November 6 – Buddy Kerr
- November 8 – Bob Brady
- November 10 – Johnny Lipon
- November 12 – Billy Reed
- November 13 – Andy Anderson
- November 18 – Kermit Wahl
- November 19 – George Yankowski
- November 23 – Grady Wilson
- November 25 – Ben Wade
- November 25 – John Wells
- November 26 – Joe Muir
- November 27 – Lou Bevil
- November 28 – Wes Westrum
- November 29 – Lynn Lovenguth

=== December ===
- December 1 – George Lerchen
- December 3 – Joe Collins
- December 5 – Bill Rodgers
- December 10 – Gordie Mueller
- December 12 – Mo Mozzali
- December 15 – Hiroshi Oshita
- December 17 – Makoto Kozuru
- December 20 – Mahlon Duckett
- December 21 – Jay Difani
- December 22 – Johnny Bero
- December 24 – Margaret Berger
- December 25 – Neal Watlington
- December 27 – Connie Johnson
- December 31 – Luis Zuloaga

== Deaths ==
=== January ===
- January 11 – Miah Murray, 57, catcher for the Nationals, Colonels, Grays and Statesmen between 1884 and 1891, who became a full-time umpire in 1895.
- January 14 – Ben Shibe, 83, owner of the Philadelphia Athletics since the 1901 season, during which period the team won six American League pennants and three World Series.
- January 19 – Bob Keating, 59, pitcher for the 1887 Baltimore Orioles.
- January 21 – Orator Shafer, 70, outfielder for 13 seasons from 1874 to 1890, who collected a .282 batting average and 1000 hits in 871 career games.
- January 27 – Emil Frisk, 47, pitcher and outfielder in four major league seasons between 1899 and 1907, who became the first player to accumulate over 2,000 hits in minor league history.
- January 30 – Billy Rhines, 52, pitcher who posted a 114–103 record for three teams between 1890 and 1899, while leading the National League in earned run average in the 1890 and 1896 seasons.
- February 6 – Frank Barrows, 77, outfielder for the 1871 Boston Red Stockings.

=== February ===
- February 15 – Pete Childs, 50, infielder who played from 1901 through 1902 for the St. Louis Cardinals, Chicago Orphans and Philadelphia Phillies.
- February 22 – George Hogan, 36, pitcher for the 1914 Kansas City Packers of the Federal League.
- February 23 – Pickles Dillhoefer, 28, catcher who played from 1917 to 1921 with the Chicago Cubs, Philadelphia Phillies and St. Louis Cardinals.
- February 23 – C. I. Taylor, 47, owner and manager of the Negro leagues' Indianapolis ABC's since 1914, co-founder of the Negro National League.
- February 28 – Walt Walker, 61, catcher for the 1884 Detroit Wolverines of the National League.

=== March ===
- March 11 – Joe Gerhardt, 67, second baseman for several teams from 1873 to 1891, who led the National League in assists twice and in double plays three times.
- March 14 – Danny Hoffman, 42, center fielder for the Athletics, Highlanders and Browns from 1903 through 1911, who led the American League in stolen bases during the 1905 season.
- March 26 – Count Gedney, 72, left fielder who played from 1872 through 1875 for the Mutuals, Athletics, Eckfords and Haymakers of the National Association.

=== April ===
- April 1 – Leech Maskrey, 68, left fielder for the Louisville Eclipse/Colonels and the Cincinnati Red Stockings from 1882 to 1886.
- April 1 – Harry Smith, 31, catcher for the New York Giants, Brooklyn Tip-Tops and Cincinnati Reds between 1914 and 1918.
- April 14 – Cap Anson, 69, Hall of Fame first baseman for the Chicago White Stockings who was the 19th century's most prolific hitter, setting career records for games, hits, runs, doubles and RBI; batted .333 lifetime, winning three batting titles, also ranked sixth all-time in home runs upon retirement; managed Chicago to five pennants (1880–82, 1885–86), 1296 career victories were record until 1907; among first managers to use pitching rotation, and first to organize spring training.

=== May ===
- May 19 – Bob Reach, 78, National Association shortstop who played from 1872 to 1873 for the Olympics and Blue Legs teams based in Washington, D.C..
- May 22 – Bill Daley, 53, pitcher for three seasons; one for the Boston Beaneaters, and two for the Boston Reds.
- May 24 – Charlie Frank, 61, outfielder for the St. Louis Browns from 1893 to 1894.
- May 25 – Charlie Gessner, 58, pitcher for the 1886 Philadelphia Athletics of the American Association.
- May 31 – John Coleman, 59, pitcher/outfielder for the Pittsburgh Alleghenys and the Quakers/Athletics Philadelphia teams between 1883 and 1890, who led all National League pitchers in starts, complete games and innings pitched during the 1883 season.

=== June ===
- June 12 – Chief Johnson, 36, pitcher who played from 1913 to 1914 for the Cincinnati Reds of the National League and the Kansas City Packers of the Federal League.
- June 24 – Dan O'Leary, 65, outfielder from 1879 to 1884, player-manager for the 1884 Cincinnati Outlaw Reds of the Union Association.
- June 28 – Dick Lowe, 68, catcher for the 1884 Detroit Wolverines of the National League.

=== July ===
- July 4 – John Pickett, 56, second baseman/outfielder for three seasons from 1889 to 1892.
- July 10 – Harvey Bailey, 45, pitcher who played for the Boston Beaneaters of the National League in 1899 and 1900.
- July 15 – Charlie Kuhns, 46, National League infielder for the Pittsburgh Pirates (1897) and the Boston Beaneaters (1899).
- July 20 – Dick Pierson, 64, first baseman for the 1885 New York Metropolitans of the American Association.
- July 27 – George Cuppy, 53, pitcher who won 24 or more games four times for the Cleveland Spiders.

=== August ===
- August 5 – Tommy McCarthy, 59, Hall of Fame outfielder for the St. Louis and Boston teams who batted .300 four times and pioneered several strategies; defensive standout led American Association in assists and steals once each.
- August 12 – Sam King, 70, first baseman for the 1884 Washington Nationals of the American Association.

=== September ===
- September 15 – Charlie Jones, 60, infielder who played for the 1884 Brooklyn Atlantics.
- September 18 – Jake Stahl, 43, manager and first baseman who led the Red Sox to the 1912 World Series title, led AL in home runs in 1910.
- September 23 – Butch Rementer, 44, catcher for the 1904 Philadelphia Phillies.
- September 30 – Frank Genins, 56, infielder/outfielder who played for the Cincinnati Reds, St. Louis Browns, Pittsburgh Pirates and Cleveland Blues between 1892 and 1901.

=== October ===
- October 14 – Rasty Wright, 59, outfielder who played in 1890 with the Syracuse Stars of the American Association and the Cleveland Spiders of the National League.
- October 25 – Pat Kilhullen, 32, catcher for the 1914 Pittsburgh Pirates.
- October 31 – Dick Padden, 52, second baseman who hit .258 in 824 games with the Pirates, Senators, Cardinals and Browns between 1896 and 1905.

=== November ===
- November 1 – Billy Goeckel, 51, first baseman for the 1899 Philadelphia Phillies.
- November 4 – John Houseman, 52, Dutch infielder/outfielder who played with the Chicago Cubs in 1894 and for the St. Louis Cardinals in 1897.
- November 6 – Morgan G. Bulkeley, 84, executive who served as the National League's first president in 1876, also as president of Hartford club; later a governor of Connecticut and U.S. Senator.
- November 7 – Sam Thompson, 62, Hall of Fame right fielder for Detroit and Philadelphia who batted .331 lifetime and won 1887 batting title; led National League in hits three times, home runs and doubles twice each; until 1921, held record of 166 RBI (1887) and ranked second in career home runs; his .505 career slugging average was second highest of 19th century.
- November 11 – Dave Pierson, 67, catcher/outfielder for the 1876 Cincinnati Reds.
- November 14 – Doc Oberlander, 58, pitcher for the 1888 Cleveland Blues of the American Association.
- November 18 – Len Lovett, 70, outfielder for the Elizabeth Resolutes (1873) and Philadelphia Centennials (1875) National Association teams.
- November 23 – Sandy McDermott, 66, second baseman for the 1885 Baltimore Orioles of the American Association.
- November 27 – Austin McHenry, 27, dies from a brain tumor after hitting .350 with 17 home runs and 110 RBI for the 1921 St. Louis Cardinals, who became ill during the 1922 season and was hitting .303 when forced to quit.

=== December ===
- December 1 – Jim Snyder, 75, catcher/shortstop for the Brooklyn Eckfords of the National Association between 1870 and 1872.
- December 22 – Dad Meek, 55, catcher who played from 1889 through 1890 for the St. Louis Browns of the American Association.
- December 25 – Wes Fisler, 81, infielder/outfielder who hit .310 for the Philadelphia Athletics from 1871 to 1876, and a member of the 1871 National Association championship team.
