= Roy Wise (baseball) =

American baseball player (1923–2008)

- Pitcher
- Born: November 18, 1923; Springfield, Illinois
- Died: February 25, 2008 (aged 84); Irvine, California
- Batted: Both Threw: Right

MLB debut
- May 12, 1944, for the Pittsburgh Pirates

Last MLB appearance
- May 13, 1944, for the Pittsburgh Pirates

MLB statistics
- Win–loss record: 0–0
- Earned run average: 9.00
- Strikeouts: 1
- Stats at Baseball Reference

Teams
- Pittsburgh Pirates (1944)

Roy Ogden Wise (November 18, 1923 – February 25, 2008) was a professional baseball pitcher. He played in Major League Baseball for the Pittsburgh Pirates during the 1944 Pittsburgh Pirates season appearing in two games on May 12 and May 13. He died in Irvine, California on February 25, 2008.
