= Cuccurullo =

Cuccurullo is an Italian surname. Notable people with the surname include:

- Cookie Cuccurullo (1918–1983), American baseball player
- Warren Cuccurullo (born 1956), American musician, singer-songwriter, restaurant owner, and body builder
