= Al Rubeling =

American baseball player (1913–1988)

- Third baseman
- Born: May 10, 1913; Baltimore, Maryland, U.S.
- Died: January 28, 1988 (aged 74); Baltimore, Maryland, U.S.
- Batted: Right Threw: Right

MLB debut
- April 16, 1940, for the Philadelphia Athletics

Last MLB appearance
- October 1, 1944, for the Pittsburgh Pirates

MLB statistics
- Batting average: .249
- Home runs: 8
- Runs batted in: 79
- Stats at Baseball Reference

Teams
- Philadelphia Athletics (1940–1941); Pittsburgh Pirates (1943–1944)

Albert William Rubeling (May 10, 1913 – January 28, 1988) was an American professional baseball third baseman. He played in Major League Baseball (MLB) for the Philadelphia Athletics and Pittsburgh Pirates. He attended Towson University and is a member of the institution's Athletic Hall of Fame. Rubeling had the most pinch hitting at bats in the National League during the 1944 season. He was born in Baltimore, Maryland and died there at the age of 74.
