= Spud Davis =

American baseball player and manager (1904–1984)

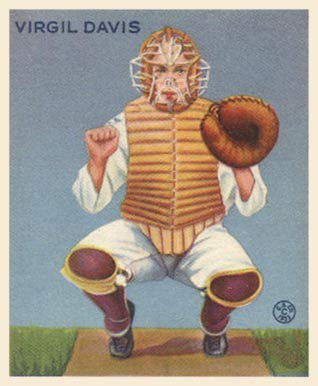
- Davis on a 1933 Goudey baseball card
- Catcher / Manager
- Born: December 20, 1904; Birmingham, Alabama, U.S.
- Died: August 14, 1984 (aged 79); Birmingham, Alabama, U.S.
- Batted: Right Threw: Right

MLB debut
- April 30, 1928, for the St. Louis Cardinals

Last MLB appearance
- September 5, 1945, for the Pittsburgh Pirates

MLB statistics
- Batting average: .308
- Home runs: 77
- Runs batted in: 647
- Stats at Baseball Reference

Teams
- As player: St. Louis Cardinals (1928); Philadelphia Phillies (1929–1933); St. Louis Cardinals (1934–1936); Cincinnati Reds (1937–1938); Philadelphia Phillies (1938–1939); Pittsburgh Pirates (1940–1941, 1944–1945); As coach: Pittsburgh Pirates (1941–1946); Chicago Cubs (1950–1953); As manager: Pittsburgh Pirates (1946)

Career highlights and awards
- World Series champion (1934)

Virgil Lawrence "Spud" Davis (December 20, 1904 – August 14, 1984) was an American professional baseball player, coach, scout and manager. He played in Major League Baseball as a catcher for the St. Louis Cardinals, Philadelphia Phillies, Cincinnati Reds, and Pittsburgh Pirates. Davis' .308 career batting average ranks fourth all-time among major league catchers.

== Baseball career ==
Born in Birmingham, Alabama, Davis began his professional baseball career in 1926 at the age of 21, playing for the Gulfport Tarpons of the Cotton States League. After posting a .356 batting average in 27 games for Gulfport, he was sent to play for the Reading Keystones of the International League where he hit for a .308 average in 137 games during the 1927 season.

Davis made his major league debut with the St. Louis Cardinals on April 30, 1928 however, after only two games, he was traded to the Philadelphia Phillies. He began as a second-string catcher with the Phillies behind Walt Lerian but, by the end of the 1929 season, he had taken over as the starting catcher with a .342 batting average along with 7 home runs and 48 runs batted in. That season would mark the first of seven consecutive seasons with batting averages above the .300 mark. In 1933, he finished second to team-mate Chuck Klein in the National League Batting Championship with a .349 average. His .395 on-base percentage was also the second highest in the league. Davis ended the season ranked 25th in the National League Most Valuable Player Award voting, despite the fact that the Phillies finished in seventh place.

In November 1933, Davis was traded back to the St. Louis Cardinals for catcher Jimmie Wilson. He platooned alongside left-handed hitting catcher Bill DeLancey, posting a .300 batting average in 107 games on a Cardinals team that became known as the Gashouse Gang for their colorful, extroverted personalities. The Cardinals won the 1934 National League pennant and, went on to defeat the Detroit Tigers in the 1934 World Series. In his only post-season appearance Davis played in two games in the seven-game series, with two hits in two at bats.

Davis had another good season in 1935 with a .317 batting average, 60 runs batted in and led National League catchers in fielding percentage however, the Cardinals slipped to second place in the standings. In 1936, his batting average dipped to .273 and in December of that year, he would be traded to the Cincinnati Reds. Davis served as a reserve catcher in 1937, working behind future Hall of Fame member Ernie Lombardi. In June 1938, he was traded back to the Philadelphia Phillies. Davis rebounded in 1939, posting a .307 batting average in 87 games. He was purchased by the Pittsburgh Pirates in October 1939 and continued to hit well in 1940 with a .326 batting average in 99 games. By 1941, Al López, another future Hall of Fame member, had taken over the Pirates starting catcher's role and, in 1942, Davis took a role as a coach for the Pirates. Due to player shortages during the Second World War, Davis returned to the playing field in 1944, appearing in 54 games for the Pirates and posting a .301 batting average at the age of 39. He appeared in 23 games in 1945 before retiring as a major league player at the age of 40.

He continued as a coach and a scout for the Pirates and, briefly managed the team when manager Frankie Frisch resigned in September of 1946. After playing with the minor league Alexander City Millers in 1947 and 1948, he returned to work as a coach with the Chicago Cubs from 1950 to 1953 before retiring from baseball.

== Career statistics ==
In a sixteen-year major league career, Davis played in 1,458 games, accumulating 1,312 hits in 4,255 at bats for a .308 career batting average along with 77 home runs, 647 runs batted in and a .369 on-base percentage. He ended his career with a .984 fielding percentage. Davis hit over .300 ten times in sixteen years. At the time of his retirement, Davis' .308 career batting average was second only to Mickey Cochrane all-time among major league catchers. As of 2010, he ranks fourth all-time among career batting averages for catchers behind Joe Mauer, Mickey Cochrane and Bill Dickey.

Davis led National League catchers twice in fielding percentage, once in assists and once in baserunners caught stealing. During his playing days, he was twice traded for the same player, fellow catcher Jimmie Wilson. These trades happened between the Phillies and Cardinals five years apart in 1928 and 1933. In 1977, Davis was inducted into the Alabama Sports Hall of Fame.

Davis died in Birmingham, Alabama, at age 79, and is buried there.
