= Joe Vitelli =

American baseball player (1908–1967)

- Born: April 12, 1908; McKees Rocks, Pennsylvania
- Died: February 7, 1967 (aged 58); Pittsburgh, Pennsylvania
- Batted: Right Threw: Right

MLB debut
- May 30, 1944, for the Pittsburgh Pirates

Last MLB appearance
- May 30, 1945, for the Pittsburgh Pirates

MLB statistics
- Win–loss record: 0–0
- Earned run average: 2.57
- Strikeouts: 2
- Stats at Baseball Reference

Teams
- Pittsburgh Pirates (1944–1945)

Antonio Joseph Vitelli (April 12, 1908 – February 7, 1967) was a Major League Baseball pitcher who played for the Pittsburgh Pirates in 1944 and 1945. The 6 ft 1 in (1.85 m), 195 lb (88 kg) right-hander was a native of McKees Rocks, Pennsylvania.

== Biography ==
Vitelli is one of many ballplayers who only appeared in the major leagues during World War II. He made his major league debut at age 36 on May 30, 1944 in a doubleheader against the Brooklyn Dodgers at Ebbets Field. The Pirates' game on May 21 was suspended due to the Sunday blue laws and completed on July 5. He appeared in the final inning of suspended game, but since statistical data is labeled with the original date of the game, some sources list his debut as May 21.

Vitelli made four relief appearances for Pittsburgh in 1944 and finished all four games. In a total of seven innings pitched he gave up six runs, but only two of them were earned runs. His ERA was 2.57. His only 1945 appearance was as a pinch runner.

== Death ==
Vitelli died in 1967 in Pittsburgh, Pennsylvania.
