= Hank Sweeney =

American baseball player (1915–1980)

Harry Sweeney
- First baseman
- Born: December 28, 1915; Franklin, Tennessee
- Died: May 6, 1980 (aged 64); Columbia, Tennessee
- Batted: Left Threw: Left

MLB debut
- October 1, 1944, for the Pittsburgh Pirates

Last MLB appearance
- October 1, 1944, for the Pittsburgh Pirates

MLB statistics
- Games played: 1
- At bats: 2
- Hits: 0
- Stats at Baseball Reference

Teams
- Pittsburgh Pirates (1944)

Harry Leon Sweeney (December 28, 1915 – May 6, 1980) was a Major League Baseball first baseman who appeared in one game for the Pittsburgh Pirates in 1944. A native of Franklin, Tennessee, the 28-year-old rookie stood 6 ft 0 in (1.83 m) and weighed 185 lbs (83.9 kg).

Sweeney is one of many ballplayers who only appeared in the major leagues during World War II. On the last day of the season (October 1), he appeared in one of the games of a doubleheader against the Philadelphia Blue Jays at Shibe Park. He went 0-for-2 (.000) but handled 10 chances for a fielding percentage of 1.000.

He died at the age of 64 in Columbia, Tennessee.
