= 1944 Major League Baseball All-Star Game =

1944 American baseball competition

	1	2	3	4	5	6	7	8	9	R	H	E
American League	0	1	0	0	0	0	0	0	0	1	6	3
National League	0	0	0	0	4	0	2	1	X	7	12	1
- Date: July 11, 1944
- Venue: Forbes Field
- City: Pittsburgh, Pennsylvania
- Managers: Joe McCarthy (NYY); Billy Southworth (SLC)
- Attendance: 29,589
- Radio: Mutual
- Radio announcers: Don Dunphy, Bill Slater and Bill Corum

The 1944 Major League Baseball All-Star Game was the 12th playing of the "Midsummer Classic" between Major League Baseball's American League (AL) and National League (NL) All-Star teams. The All-Star Game was held on July 11, 1944 at Forbes Field in Pittsburgh, Pennsylvania, the home of the NL's Pittsburgh Pirates.

The game resulted in the National League defeating the American League 7–1.

Played during World War II, receipts from the game were distributed to a fund that provided baseball equipment to members of the armed services.

== Pirates in the game ==
The Pirates hosted the game and were well-represented. Pirates pitcher Rip Sewell, infielder Bob Elliott, and outfielder Vince DiMaggio were selected for the National League All-Star squad.

Pirates pitchers Max Butcher and Cookie Cuccurullo were named the NL's batting practice pitchers and Pirates catcher Spud Davis was the NL's batting practice catcher. Honus Wagner was named an honorary coach, the first time this honor was bestowed in Major League Baseball's All-Star Game.

== Starting lineups ==
Players in italics have since been inducted into the National Baseball Hall of Fame.

=== American League ===
- Thurman Tucker, cf
- Stan Spence, rf
- George McQuinn, 1b
- Vern Stephens, ss
- Bob Johnson, lf
- Ken Keltner, 3b
- Bobby Doerr, 2b
- Rollie Hemsley, c
- Hank Borowy, p

=== National League ===
- Augie Galan, lf
- Phil Cavarretta, 1b
- Stan Musial, cf
- Walker Cooper, c
- Dixie Walker, rf
- Bob Elliott, 3b
- Connie Ryan, 2b
- Marty Marion, ss
- Bucky Walters, p

=== Umpires ===
Position	Umpire	League
Home Plate	George Barr	National
First Base	Charlie Berry	American
Second Base	Ziggy Sears	National
Third Base	Cal Hubbard	American

The umpires changed assignments in the middle of the fifth inning – Barr and Hubbard swapped positions, also Berry and Sears swapped positions.

== Synopsis ==
Tuesday, July 11, 1944 9:00 pm (ET) at Forbes Field in Pittsburgh, Pennsylvania
Team	1	2	3	4	5	6	7	8	9	R	H	E
American League	0	1	0	0	0	0	0	0	0	1	6	3
National League	0	0	0	0	4	0	2	1	X	7	12	1
WP: Ken Raffensberger (1–0) LP: Tex Hughson (0–1) Sv: Jim Tobin (1)

The American League scored in the second inning on a single by Hank Borowy, its pitcher, but never scored again. The National League got four runs in the fifth inning, led by Bill Nicholson's pinch-hit double. Whitey Kurowski knocked in two more runs with a double in the seventh. A sacrifice fly by Stan Musial in the eighth inning closed out the scoring. Ken Raffensberger was the winning pitcher for the Nationals.
