= Mickey Taborn =

American baseball player (1922–1996)

- Catcher
- Born: July 21, 1922; Carrier Mills, Illinois, U.S.
- Died: December 21, 1996 (aged 74); San Antonio, Texas, U.S.
- Batted: Right Threw: Right

NAL debut
- 5th of August, 1946, for the Kansas City Monarchs

Last NAL appearance
- 1948, for the Kansas City Monarchs
- Stats at Baseball Reference

Teams
- Kansas City Monarchs (1946–1948)

Earl "Mickey" Taborn (July 21, 1922 – December 21, 1996) was an American professional baseball catcher in the Negro leagues, minor leagues and in the Mexican League. He played from 1946 to 1961 with several teams.
