= Frankie Zak =

American baseball player (1922–1972)

- Shortstop
- Born: February 22, 1922; Passaic, New Jersey, U.S.
- Died: February 6, 1972 (aged 49); Passaic, New Jersey, U.S.
- Batted: Right Threw: Right

MLB debut
- April 21, 1944, for the Pittsburgh Pirates

Last MLB appearance
- June 10, 1946, for the Pittsburgh Pirates

MLB statistics
- Batting average: .269
- Hits: 56
- Run batted in: 14
- Stats at Baseball Reference

Teams
- Pittsburgh Pirates (1944–1946)

Career highlights and awards
- All-Star (1944)

Frank Thomas Zak (February 22, 1922 – February 6, 1972) was an American professional baseball player. The shortstop played all or part of three seasons in Major League Baseball from 1944 to 1946. Zak played for the Pittsburgh Pirates his entire MLB career, his main position being shortstop. For his career, Zak hit for a .269 batting average, with 56 total hits (including five doubles and one triple in 123 big-league games played).

== Minor leagues ==
Born in Passaic, New Jersey, Zak threw and batted right-handed, stood 5 feet 10 inches (1.78 m) tall and weighed 150 pounds (68 kg). He was a gifted athlete, but had little interest in playing baseball for a living. In the spring of 1941, he visited a high-school friend, Ed Sudol, who had been signed by the Tarboro Orioles of the Class D Coastal Plain League. The Orioles were in need of a shortstop and gave Zak a tryout. He had not played the position before, but showed enough to earn a contract for the summer. Zak played at the Class D level for 1941 and 1942, then moved up to top-level Toronto of the International League in 1943. He earned an invitation to the Pirates' camp in 1944, and made the club. In an interesting coincidence, his manager was named Frankie (Frisch) as was the player with whom he competed for the starting shortstop job (Gustine). Sudol, meanwhile, never made it to the majors as a player, but he would spend 21 years as an umpire in the National League.

== All-Star selection ==
Zak never had a lot of playing time: his highest number of at bats was 160. Even so, he still managed to become an All-Star in the wartime 1944 season. When shortstop Eddie Miller of the Cincinnati Reds was injured, Zak was named as his roster replacement, possibly because the game was being held at Forbes Field, home of the Pirates, and selecting Zak allowed MLB not to have to purchase an extra train ticket. Zak never appeared in the contest (St. Louis Cardinals' standout Marty Marion played the full game), won by the National League, 7–1.

Zak played his last MLB game on June 10, 1946. He returned to minor leagues and left baseball after the 1949 season.

== Death ==
Zak died suddenly from a heart attack on February 6, 1972, just 16 days before his 50th birthday.
