= Frank Barrows =

American baseball player (1844–1922)

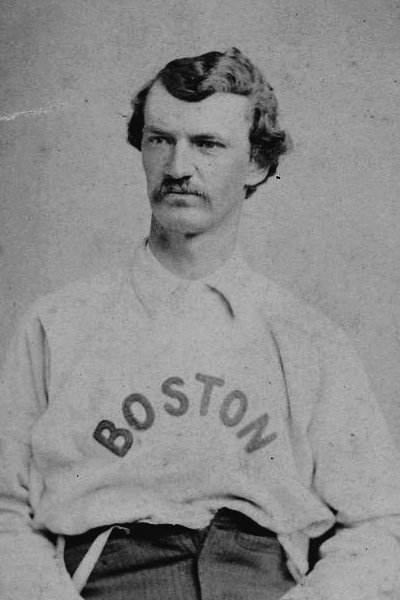
- Outfielder
- Born: October 22, 1844; Hudson, Ohio, U.S.
- Died: February 6, 1922 (aged 77); Fitchburg, Massachusetts, U.S.
- Batted: Unknown Threw: Unknown

MLB debut
- May 20, 1871, for the Boston Red Stockings

Last MLB appearance
- October 7, 1871, for the Boston Red Stockings

MLB statistics
- Games played: 18
- Batting average: .151
- Runs batted in: 11
- Stats at Baseball Reference

Teams
- National Association of Base Ball Players Boston Tri-Mountains (1867–1870) National Association of Professional BBP Boston Red Stockings (1871)

Franklin Lee Barrows (October 22, 1844 – February 6, 1922) was an American Major League Baseball player for the 1871 Boston Red Stockings.

== Sources ==
- Career statistics from Baseball Reference · Retrosheet
