= Charlie Jones (infielder) =

American baseball player (1861–1922)

- Third baseman / Second baseman
- Born: October 24, 1861; New York City, U.S.
- Died: September 15, 1922 (aged 60); New York City, U.S.
- Batted: Unknown Threw: Unknown

MLB debut
- June 28, 1884, for the Brooklyn Atlantics

Last MLB appearance
- October 24, 1884, for the Brooklyn Atlantics

MLB statistics
- Batting average: .178
- Home runs: 0
- Runs batted in: 0
- Stats at Baseball Reference

Teams
- Brooklyn Atlantics (1884)

Charles F. Jones (October 24, 1861 – September 15, 1922) was an American professional baseball player. He played part of one season in Major League Baseball for the 1884 Brooklyn Atlantics.

During his one major league season, Jones played 11 games as a third baseman, 13 games as a second baseman, and two games in the outfield for a total playing time of 25 games. He batted .178, hit one double, and had five bases on balls.

Jones died at the age of 60 in hometown of New York City, and is interred at St. Raymond Cemetery in The Bronx, New York.
