= Ira F. Lewis =

American journalist

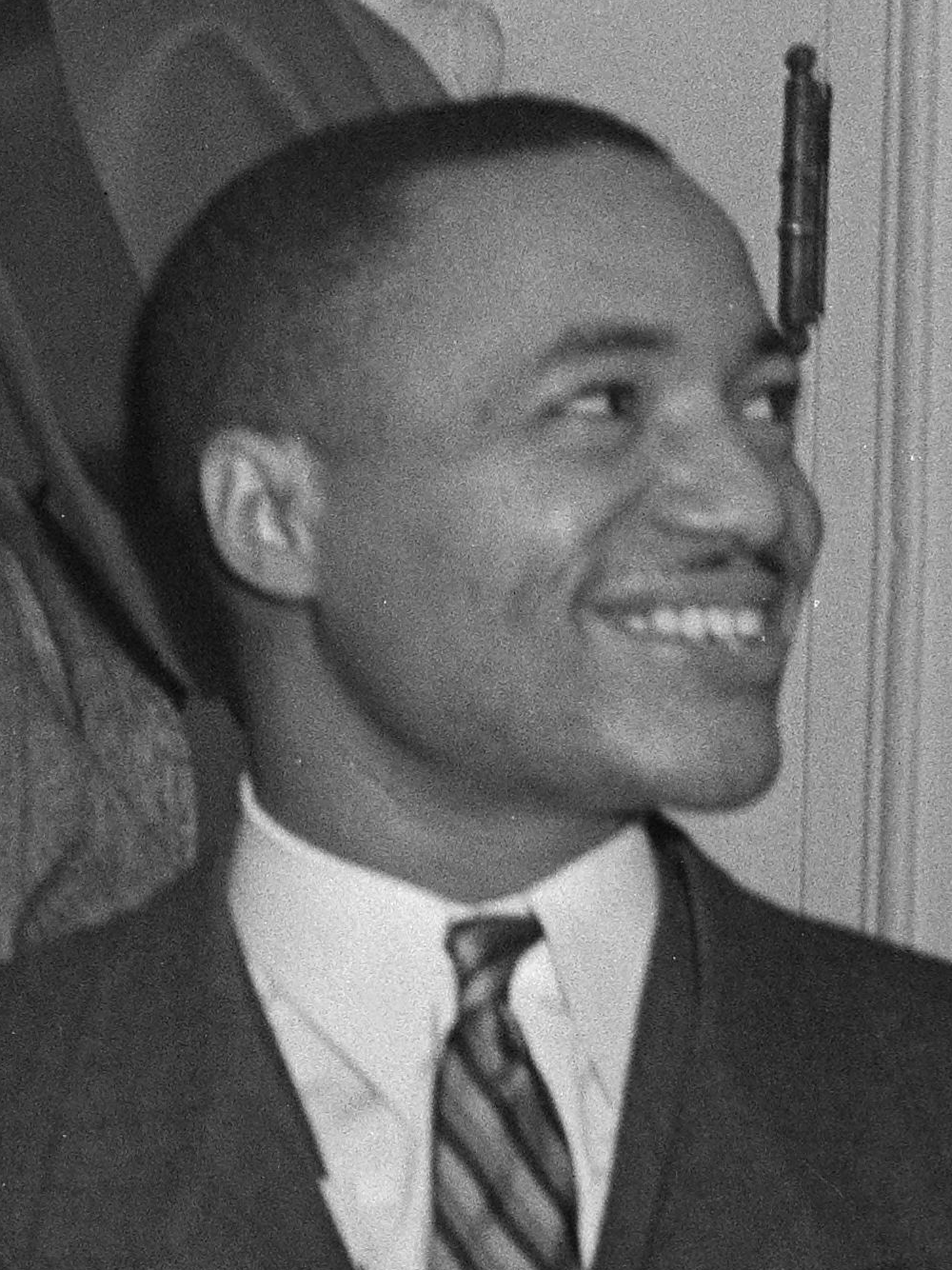
- Lewis in 1943
- Born: August 25, 1883; Lexington, North Carolina
- Died: September 4, 1948 (aged 65)
- Occupation: Business manager of the Pittsburgh Courier

Ira Foster Lewis (August 25, 1883 - September 4, 1948) was an American sportswriter, executive editor, president, and business manager of the Pittsburgh Courier. He was involved in the Double V campaign to grant full citizenship rights to African American soldiers serving in World War II and helped integrate major league baseball.

== Early life ==
Lewis was born in Lexington, North Carolina on August 25, 1883. He studied at Biddle Academy for one year.

== Career ==
Along with Robert L. Vann and Bill Nunn, he helped lead the Pittsburgh Courier.

He was a leader in the National Negro Publishers Association. In 1937 he corresponded with W. E. B. Du Bois.

Lewis was photographed with his family in Homewood by Charles "Teenie" Harris.
