= Fritz Ostermueller =

American baseball player (1907–1957)

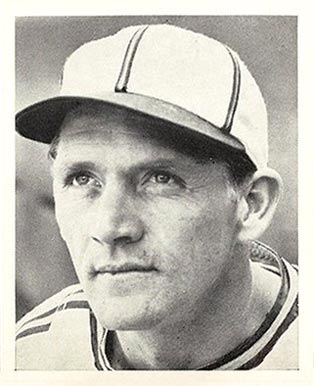
- Pitcher
- Born: September 15, 1907; Quincy, Illinois, U.S.
- Died: December 17, 1957 (aged 50); Quincy, Illinois, U.S.
- Batted: Left Threw: Left

MLB debut
- April 21, 1934, for the Boston Red Sox

Last MLB appearance
- September 30, 1948, for the Pittsburgh Pirates

MLB statistics
- Win–loss record: 114–115
- Earned run average: 3.99
- Strikeouts: 774
- Stats at Baseball Reference

Teams
- Boston Red Sox (1934–1940); St. Louis Browns (1941–1943); Brooklyn Dodgers (1943–1944); Pittsburgh Pirates (1944–1948)

Frederick Raymond "Fritz" Ostermueller (September 15, 1907 – December 17, 1957) was an American left-handed pitcher in Major League Baseball from 1934 to 1948, playing for the Boston Red Sox, St. Louis Browns, Brooklyn Dodgers, and Pittsburgh Pirates. While with Pittsburgh, he coined a quote frequently misattributed to teammate Ralph Kiner: "Home run hitters drive Cadillacs; singles hitters drive Fords."

== Early life ==
Ostermueller was born to German immigrants George Ostermuller and Anna Wink. He was the second youngest of nine children. Although many of his siblings names are unknown, the documented are Richard (1909–1985) and his only sister, Elinor (1902–1977). He grew up on a dairy farm in Quincy, Illinois.

== Career ==
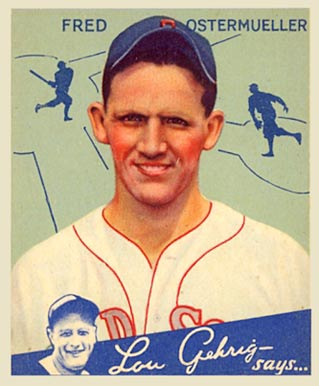
Ostermueller in 1934

Ostermueller began his career in his home town of Quincy, Illinois, before finishing high school. In 1929 he had 95 strikeouts for the Shawnee Robins of the Western Association, and later played for the Rochester Red Wings.

Ostermueller made his major league debut on April 21, 1934 with the Boston Red Sox, pitching seven seasons for them, chiefly as a starter. On December 3, 1940, he was sold to the St. Louis Browns, along with Denny Galehouse. He was the ace of the Pirates staff in 1947 and 1948 at the age of 41 and was called "Old Folks."

As a hitter, Ostermueller was better than average for a pitcher. He posted a .234 batting average (175-for-749) with 60 runs, 62 RBI and 35 bases on balls. He did not hit any home runs in his major league career.

== In popular culture ==
Ostermueller was portrayed in the film 42 by Linc Hand. In the film, Ostermueller hits Jackie Robinson with a high pitch, but in a subsequent game Robinson hits a game winning home run off him.

In reality Ostermueller's first inning pitch hit Robinson on the left wrist, not his head, and he claimed it was a routine brushback pitch without racist intent. His family denied that he was a racist, it was just "a movie ploy." There was no fight on the mound afterwards. The climactic scene in which Robinson hit a home run to clinch the National League pennant for the Dodgers came in the top of the fourth inning of the game; it made the score 1–0, and the Dodgers eventually won 4–2. The Dodgers achieved a tie for the pennant on that day before winning the pennant the next day.

== Later life and death ==
Ostermueller coached in college and built and became the owner-operator of the Diamond Motel in Quincy, Illinois. He died on December 17, 1957, aged 50, of colon cancer.
