= Tommy O'Brien (baseball) =

American baseball player (1918–1978)

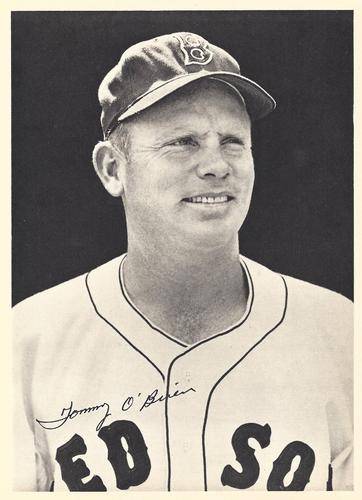
- Outfielder
- Born: December 19, 1918; Anniston, Alabama, US
- Died: November 5, 1978 (aged 59); Anniston, Alabama, US
- Batted: Right Threw: Right

MLB debut
- April 24, 1943, for the Pittsburgh Pirates

Last MLB appearance
- May 13, 1950, for the Washington Senators

MLB statistics
- Batting average: .277
- Home runs: 8
- Runs batted in: 78
- Stats at Baseball Reference

Teams
- Pittsburgh Pirates (1943–1945); Boston Red Sox (1949–1950); Washington Senators (1950)

Thomas Edward O'Brien (December 19, 1918 – November 5, 1978) was an American outfielder and third baseman in Major League Baseball, playing mainly as a right fielder for three different teams between the 1943 and 1950 seasons. Listed at 5 ft 11 in (1.80 m), 195 lb. O'Brien batted and threw right-handed. He was born in Anniston, Alabama.

Basically a line-drive hitter and a good fielding replacement, O'Brien entered the majors in 1943 with the Pittsburgh Pirates, playing for them three years before joining the Boston Red Sox (1949–1950) and Washington Senators (1950). His most productive season came in his rookie year, when he posted career-highs in batting average (.310), runs (35), extrabases (21), RBI (26) and games played (89).

In a five-season career, O'Brien was a .277 hitter (198-for-714) with eight home runs and 78 RBI in 293 games, including 110 runs, 30 doubles, 14 triples, two stolen bases, and a .344 on-base percentage.

O'Brien died in Anniston at the age of 59.
