= Xavier Rescigno =

American baseball player (1912–2005)

- Pitcher
- Born: October 13, 1912; New York City, U.S.
- Died: December 24, 2005 (aged 93); Sun City West, Arizona, U.S.
- Batted: Right Threw: Right

MLB debut
- April 22, 1943, for the Pittsburgh Pirates

Last MLB appearance
- September 30, 1945, for the Pittsburgh Pirates

MLB statistics
- Win–loss record: 19–22
- Earned run average: 4.13
- Strikeouts: 115
- Stats at Baseball Reference

Teams
- Pittsburgh Pirates (1943–1945)

Xavier Frederick Rescigno (October 13, 1912 – December 24, 2005) was an American professional baseball pitcher. He played in Major League Baseball (MLB) for the Pittsburgh Pirates from 1943 to 1945. The 5 ft 10 1/2 in (1.79 m), 175 lb (79 kg) right-hander was a native of New York, New York. He attended St. Ann's Academy in Manhattan, New York.

Rescigno is one of many ballplayers who only appeared in the major leagues during World War II. He started out as a member of the New York Yankees's farm system, and was notably a member of the 1937 Newark Bears squad is often mentioned as one of the greatest minor league teams in history, but he had difficulty working his way into a spot on the deep Yankee roster. The enrollment of many players in the armed forces brought opportunity, however, and at the age of 30, Rescigno made his major league debut as a relief pitcher for the Pirates against the Chicago Cubs at Wrigley Field on April 22, 1943. He started 14 games that season and was relieved in 23. The best start of his career came on September 12, 1943, when he hurled a 7–0 complete game shutout against the Cincinnati Reds in the second game of a doubleheader at Crosley Field.

"Mr. X", as he was sometimes called, then became the 1940s version of a closer in his next two seasons. In 1944 he ranked second in the National League in games pitched, saves, and games finished. In 1945 he was sixth in games pitched, and third in saves and games finished. Career totals for his three seasons include 129 games, 21 starts, 7 complete games, 1 shutout, 60 games finished, and 16 saves. In 335.1 innings pitched he struck out 115 and walked 113. His final record was 19–22 with a 4.13 ERA.

After the 1945 season, the Pirates sold Rescigno to the Hollywood Stars, as part of a larger agreement between the two clubs. The Pirates would send eight players to the Stars, and in return would be permitted to select two players from Hollywood's roster at the end of the year. Rescigno was one of the better players on the Stars that year, as they finished third.

Rescigno was subsequently a member of the 1937 Smiths Falls Beavers.

Rescigno died at the age of 93 in Sun City West, Arizona.
