= 1944 Major League Baseball season =

1944 MLB season
- League: American League (AL); National League (NL)
- Sport: Baseball
- Duration: Regular season: April 18 – October 1, 1944; World Series: October 4–9, 1944
- Games: 154
- Teams: 16 (8 per league)

Regular season
- Season MVP: AL: Hal Newhouser (DET); NL: Marty Marion (STL)
- AL champions: St. Louis Browns
- AL runners-up: Detroit Tigers
- NL champions: St. Louis Cardinals
- NL runners-up: Pittsburgh Pirates

World Series
- Champions: St. Louis Cardinals
- Runners-up: St. Louis Browns

MLB seasons
- ← 1943 1945 →

Locations of teams for the 1942–1953 American League seasons
American League
Locations of teams for the 1943–1952 National League seasons
National League

The 1944 major league baseball season began on April 18, 1944. The regular season ended on October 1, with the St. Louis Cardinals and St. Louis Browns as the regular season champions of the National League and American League, respectively. In an all-St. Louis postseason, the postseason began with Game 1 of the 41st World Series on October 4 and ended with Game 6 on October 9. The Cardinals defeated the Browns, four games to two, capturing their fifth championship in franchise history, since their previous in 1942. Going into the season, the defending World Series champions were the New York Yankees from the 1943 season.

The 12th All-Star Game was held on July 11 at the Forbes Field in Pittsburgh, Pennsylvania, home of the Pittsburgh Pirates. The National League won, 7–1.

The season is notable for greatly relaxing restrictions on night games.

This was Kenesaw Mountain Landis' last season of his 24-year tenure as commissioner, following his death in November. He would be succeeded by Happy Chandler.

== Challenging the color line ==
During the final days of the 1943 Winter Meetings prior to the season's start, commissioner Kenesaw Mountain Landis (who, according to a number of baseball authors, has had racism ascribed to him for actively perpetuating the baseball color line) invited singer Paul Robeson, and three black journalists, Ira F. Lewis of the Pittsburgh Courier, John H. Sengstacke of The Chicago Defender, and Howard Murphy of the Baltimore Afro-American, to plead their case in favor of integration in baseball, marking the first time a black person had spoken directly with the leaders of Organized Baseball about this topic. In response, Landis read a joint American League-National League statement stating that "There is no rule, formal or informal, or any understanding — unwritten, subterranean or sub-anything — against the hiring of Negro players by the teams of organized baseball."

However, it would not be until after Landis' death in November 1944 that baseball would begin to move towards breaking the color line. With the support from incoming commissioner Happy Chandler, Brooklyn Dodgers general manager Branch Rickey signed Jackie Robinson in late-October 1945 to their top minor-league affiliate, the Montreal Royals, eventually breaking the major-league color barrier following his promotion to the majors in 1947.

== Schedule ==
The 1944 schedule consisted of 154 games for all teams in the American League and National League, each of which had eight teams. Each team was scheduled to play 22 games against the other seven teams of their respective league. This continued the format put in place since the 1904 season (except for 1919) and would be used until 1961 in the American League and 1962 in the National League.

Opening Day took place on April 18, featuring fourteen teams. The final day of the regular season was on October 1, which saw all sixteen teams play, continuing the trend since the previous season. The World Series took place between October 4 and October 9.

=== Tri-Cornered Baseball Game ===
A unique three-way exhibition game, formatted as a round-robin, was held at the Polo Grounds, which saw the Brooklyn Dodgers, New York Giants, and New York Yankees play a game on June 26 to sell war bonds to aid in the U.S. war effort in World War II, in which they would raise $6 million (equivalent to $109.7 million in 2025). The Dodgers defeating the Yankees and Giants, winning the game 5–1–0, respectively. Including a $50 million donation from New York City, a total of $56 million (equivalent to $1.024 billion in 2025) was raised or the war effort.

== Rule change ==
The 1944 season saw the following rule change:

- During the July All-Star break, all teams were given permission to have unlimited weekday night games. Previously, all teams were allowed only 14 (except the Washington Senators, which were allowed 21).

== Teams ==
An asterisk (*) denotes the ballpark a team played the minority of their home games at

League	Team	City	Ballpark	Capacity	Manager
American League	Boston Red Sox	Boston, Massachusetts	Fenway Park	33,817	Joe Cronin
American League	Chicago White Sox	Chicago, Illinois	Comiskey Park	50,000	Jimmy Dykes
American League	Cleveland Indians	Cleveland, Ohio	Cleveland Stadium	78,811	Lou Boudreau
American League	Cleveland Indians	Cleveland, Ohio	League Park*	22,500*	Lou Boudreau
American League	Detroit Tigers	Detroit, Michigan	Briggs Stadium	58,000	Steve O'Neill
American League	New York Yankees	New York, New York	Yankee Stadium	70,000	Joe McCarthy
American League	Philadelphia Athletics	Philadelphia, Pennsylvania	Shibe Park	33,000	Connie Mack
American League	St. Louis Browns	St. Louis, Missouri	Sportsman's Park	34,023	Luke Sewell
American League	Washington Senators	Washington, D.C.	Griffith Stadium	32,000	Ossie Bluege
National League	Boston Braves	Boston, Massachusetts	Braves Field	37,746	Bob Coleman
National League	Brooklyn Dodgers	New York, New York	Ebbets Field	35,000	Leo Durocher
National League	Chicago Cubs	Chicago, Illinois	Wrigley Field	38,396	Jimmie Wilson
National League	Chicago Cubs	Chicago, Illinois	Wrigley Field	38,396	Roy Johnson
National League	Chicago Cubs	Chicago, Illinois	Wrigley Field	38,396	Charlie Grimm
National League	Cincinnati Reds	Cincinnati, Ohio	Crosley Field	29,401	Bill McKechnie
National League	New York Giants	New York, New York	Polo Grounds	56,000	Mel Ott
National League	Philadelphia Phillies	Philadelphia, Pennsylvania	Shibe Park	33,000	Freddie Fitzsimmons
National League	Pittsburgh Pirates	Pittsburgh, Pennsylvania	Forbes Field	33,467	Frankie Frisch
National League	St. Louis Cardinals	St. Louis, Missouri	Sportsman's Park	34,023	Billy Southworth

== Standings ==
=== American League ===
American League
Team	W	L	Pct.	GB	Home	Road
St. Louis Browns	89	65	.578	—	54‍–‍23	35‍–‍42
Detroit Tigers	88	66	.571	1	43‍–‍34	45‍–‍32
New York Yankees	83	71	.539	6	47‍–‍31	36‍–‍40
Boston Red Sox	77	77	.500	12	47‍–‍30	30‍–‍47
Cleveland Indians	72	82	.468	17	39‍–‍38	33‍–‍44
Philadelphia Athletics	72	82	.468	17	39‍–‍37	33‍–‍45
Chicago White Sox	71	83	.461	18	41‍–‍36	30‍–‍47
Washington Senators	64	90	.416	25	40‍–‍37	24‍–‍53

=== National League ===
National League
Team	W	L	Pct.	GB	Home	Road
St. Louis Cardinals	105	49	.682	—	54‍–‍22	51‍–‍27
Pittsburgh Pirates	90	63	.588	14½	49‍–‍28	41‍–‍35
Cincinnati Reds	89	65	.578	16	45‍–‍33	44‍–‍32
Chicago Cubs	75	79	.487	30	35‍–‍42	40‍–‍37
New York Giants	67	87	.435	38	39‍–‍36	28‍–‍51
Boston Braves	65	89	.422	40	38‍–‍40	27‍–‍49
Brooklyn Dodgers	63	91	.409	42	37‍–‍39	26‍–‍52
Philadelphia Phillies	61	92	.399	43½	29‍–‍49	32‍–‍43

=== Tie games ===
11 tie games (3 in AL, 8 in NL), which are not factored into winning percentage or games behind (and were often replayed again) occurred throughout the season.

==== American League ====
- Boston Red Sox, 2
- Cleveland Indians, 1
- Detroit Tigers, 2
- Philadelphia Athletics, 1

==== National League ====
- Boston Braves, 1
- Brooklyn Dodgers, 1
- Chicago Cubs, 3
- Cincinnati Reds, 1
- New York Giants, 1
- Philadelphia Phillies, 1
- Pittsburgh Pirates, 5
- St. Louis Cardinals, 3

== Postseason ==
The postseason began on October 4 and ended on October 9 with the St. Louis Cardinals defeating the St. Louis Browns in the 1944 World Series in six games.

=== Bracket ===
World Series
AL	St. Louis Browns	2
NL	St. Louis Cardinals	4

== Managerial changes ==
=== In-season ===
Team	Former Manager	New Manager
Chicago Cubs	Jimmie Wilson	Roy Johnson
Chicago Cubs	Roy Johnson	Charlie Grimm

== League leaders ==
=== American League ===
Hitting leaders
Stat	Player	Total
AVG	Lou Boudreau (CLE)	.327
OPS	Bob Johnson (BOS)	.959
HR	Nick Etten (NYY)	22
RBI	Vern Stephens (SLB)	109
R	Snuffy Stirnweiss (NYY)	125
H	Snuffy Stirnweiss (NYY)	205
SB	Snuffy Stirnweiss (NYY)	55

Pitching leaders
Stat	Player	Total
W	Hal Newhouser (DET)	29
L	Bill Dietrich (CWS); Early Wynn (WSH)	17
ERA	Dizzy Trout (DET)	2.12
K	Hal Newhouser (DET)	187
IP	Dizzy Trout (DET)	352.1
SV	Joe Berry (PHA); George Caster (SLB); Gordon Maltzberger (CWS)	12
WHIP	Tex Hughson (BOS)	1.048

=== National League ===
Hitting leaders
Stat	Player	Total
AVG	Dixie Walker (BRO)	.357
OPS	Stan Musial (STL)	.990
HR	Bill Nicholson (CHC)	33
RBI	Bill Nicholson (CHC)	122
R	Bill Nicholson (CHC)	116
H	Phil Cavarretta (CHC); Stan Musial (STL)	197
SB	Johnny Barrett (PIT)	28

Pitching leaders
Stat	Player	Total
W	Bucky Walters (CIN)	23
L	Ken Raffensberger (PHI)	20
ERA	Ed Heusser (CIN)	2.38
K	Bill Voiselle (NYG)	161
IP	Bill Voiselle (NYG)	312.2
SV	Ace Adams (NYG)	13
WHIP	Ted Wilks (STL)	1.069

== Milestones ==
=== Batters ===
==== Cycles ====
- Bobby Doerr (BOS):
  - Doerr hit for his first cycle and ninth in franchise history, in game two of a doubleheader on May 17 against the St. Louis Browns.
- Bob Johnson (BOS):
  - Johnson hit for his first cycle and 10th in franchise history, on July 6 against the Detroit Tigers.
- Dixie Walker (BRO):
  - Walker hit for his first cycle and fifth in franchise history, on September 2 against the New York Giants.

==== Other batting accomplishments ====
- Phil Weintraub (NYG):
  - Became the fourth player to hit at least 10 runs batted in (RBI) in a single game, hitting 11 against the Brooklyn Dodgers in game one of a doubleheader on April 30.

=== Pitchers ===
==== No-hitters ====
- Jim Tobin (BSN):
  - Tobin threw his first career no-hitter and the sixth no-hitter in franchise history, by defeating the Brooklyn Dodgers 2–0 on April 27. Tobin walked two and struck out four.
- Clyde Shoun (CIN):
  - Shoun threw his first career no-hitter and the eighth no-hitter in franchise history, by defeating the Boston Braves 1–0 on May 15. Shoun walked one and struck out one.

==== Other pitching accomplishments ====
- Mel Harder (CLE):
  - Becomes the 50th pitcher in major league history to win 200 games, defeating the Boston Red Sox, 5–4.

== Awards and honors ==
=== Regular season ===
Baseball Writers' Association of America Awards
BBWAA Award	National League	American League
Most Valuable Player	Marty Marion (STL)	Hal Newhouser (DET)

=== Other awards ===
The Sporting News Awards
Award	National League	American League
Most Valuable Player	Marty Marion (STL)	Bobby Doerr (BOS)
Player of the Year	Marty Marion (STL)	—
Pitcher of the Year	Bill Voiselle (NYG)	Hal Newhouser (DET)
Manager of the Year	—	Luke Sewell (SLB)
Executive of the Year	—	Bill DeWitt (SLB)

=== Baseball Hall of Fame ===
- Kenesaw Mountain Landis (executive)

== Home field attendance ==
Team name	Wins	%±	Home attendance	%±	Per game
Detroit Tigers	88	12.8%	923,176	52.3%	11,836
New York Yankees	83	−15.3%	789,995	27.8%	10,128
New York Giants	67	21.8%	674,483	44.7%	8,993
Chicago Cubs	75	1.4%	640,110	25.9%	8,207
Brooklyn Dodgers	63	−22.2%	605,905	−8.4%	7,869
Pittsburgh Pirates	90	12.5%	604,278	21.2%	7,460
Chicago White Sox	71	−13.4%	563,539	10.7%	7,319
Washington Senators	64	−23.8%	525,235	−8.6%	6,821
St. Louis Browns	89	23.6%	508,644	137.2%	6,606
Boston Red Sox	77	13.2%	506,975	41.5%	6,500
Philadelphia Athletics	72	46.9%	505,322	34.1%	6,649
Cleveland Indians	72	−12.2%	475,272	8.3%	6,093
St. Louis Cardinals	105	0.0%	461,968	−10.7%	6,000
Cincinnati Reds	89	2.3%	409,567	8.0%	5,251
Philadelphia Phillies	61	−4.7%	369,586	−20.9%	4,678
Boston Braves	65	−4.4%	208,691	−23.1%	2,676

== Venues ==
Over 78 home games, the Cleveland Indians played 43 games at Cleveland Stadium and 35 games at League Park. All Sunday home games took place at Cleveland Stadium. All Saturday home games took place at League Park. This would be the 10th of 12 seasons since 1932 that saw the Indians play at both venues.

== Retired numbers ==
Carl Hubbell had his No. 11 retired by the New York Giants. This was the first number retired by the team.

== See also ==
- 1944 in baseball (Events, Births, Deaths)
- 1944 All-American Girls Professional Baseball League season
