= Nick Strincevich =

American baseball player (1915–2011)

- Pitcher
- Born: March 1, 1915; Gary, Indiana, U.S.
- Died: November 11, 2011 (aged 96); Valparaiso, Indiana, U.S.
- Batted: Right Threw: Right

MLB debut
- April 23, 1940, for the Boston Bees

Last MLB appearance
- June 11, 1948, for the Philadelphia Phillies

MLB statistics
- Win–loss record: 46–49
- Earned run average: 4.05
- Strikeouts: 274
- Stats at Baseball Reference

Teams
- Boston Bees / Braves (1940–1941); Pittsburgh Pirates (1941–1942, 1944–1948); Philadelphia Phillies (1948)

Nicholas Strincevich (March 1, 1915 – November 11, 2011) was an American Major League baseball player. Born in Gary, Indiana, the right-handed pitcher made his big-league debut with the Boston Bees on April 23, 1940, played part of the 1941 season with the Boston Braves, played from 1941 to 1948 (excluding 1943) with the Pittsburgh Pirates, and finished his big league career on June 11, 1948, with the Philadelphia Phillies. According to at least one source, Strincevich was selected to play on the 1945 All-Star team from the National League, but, due to wartime travel restrictions, the game was never played.

In a 10-season career, Strincevich posted a 46–49 record with a 4.05 ERA in 889 2/3 innings pitched. Nicknamed "Jumbo", he was listed as 6 feet 1 inch (1.85 m) tall and 180 pounds (82 kg).

Strincevich died on November 11, 2011, in Valparaiso, Indiana. His funeral service was held at the Saint Sava Serbian Orthodox Church of Merrillville, Indiana. He was buried at Calumet Park Cemetery.

== See also ==
- Pete Suder
- Johnny Miljus
- Doc Medich
- Walt Dropo
- Eli Grba
- Steve Swetonic
- Babe Martin
- Dave Rajsich
- Gary Rajsich
