= Bill Rodgers (outfielder) =

American baseball player (1922–2002)

- Outfielder
- Born: December 5, 1922; Harrisburg, Pennsylvania, U.S.
- Died: May 13, 2002 (aged 79); Worcester, Massachusetts, U.S.
- Batted: Left Threw: Left

MLB debut
- September 27, 1944, for the Pittsburgh Pirates

Last MLB appearance
- April 21, 1945, for the Pittsburgh Pirates

MLB statistics
- Games played: 3
- At bats: 5
- Hits: 2
- Stats at Baseball Reference

Teams
- Pittsburgh Pirates (1944–1945)

William Sherman Rodgers (December 5, 1922 – May 13, 2002) was an American Major League Baseball right fielder who played for the Pittsburgh Pirates in 1944 and 1945. A native of Harrisburg, Pennsylvania, he stood 6 ft 0 in (1.83 m) and weighed 162 lbs.

== Biography ==
Rodgers is one of many ballplayers who only appeared in the major leagues during World War II. He made his major league debut on September 27, 1944 in a road game against the Boston Braves at Braves Field. He played in one more game that season, and in his one appearance in right field recorded no chances. Rodgers played in just one big league game in 1945 (April 21), going 1-for-1 as a pinch hitter against the Chicago Cubs at Forbes Field.

In a career total of three games he was 2-for-5 (.400) with one run scored. On November 5, 1946 he was drafted by the New York Yankees from the Pirates in the 1946 minor league draft, but never again made it to the major leagues.

== Death ==
Rodgers died at the age of 79 in Worcester, Massachusetts.
