= Vic Barnhart =

American baseball player (1922–2017)

- Shortstop
- Born: September 1, 1922; Hagerstown, Maryland, U.S.
- Died: April 13, 2017 (aged 94); Hagerstown, Maryland, U.S.
- Batted: Right Threw: Right

MLB debut
- October 1, 1944, for the Pittsburgh Pirates

Last MLB appearance
- April 21, 1946, for the Pittsburgh Pirates

MLB statistics
- At bats: 204
- Runs batted in: 19
- Batting average: .270
- Stats at Baseball Reference

Teams
- Pittsburgh Pirates (1944–1946)

Victor Dee Barnhart (September 1, 1922 – April 13, 2017) was an American professional baseball player who played for the Pittsburgh Pirates in the National League for parts of three season spanning 1944 to 1946. Born in Hagerstown, Maryland, he was the son of Clyde Barnhart, who had also played for the Pirates. In three seasons in the Major Leagues, he played in 74 games. He was traded to the Brooklyn Dodgers on December 3, 1947, but never took the field with them. Barnhart died on April 13, 2017, at the age of 94.

== See also ==
- List of second-generation Major League Baseball players
