= Cookie Cuccurullo =

American baseball player (1918–1983)

- Pitcher
- Born: February 8, 1918; Asbury Park, New Jersey, U.S.
- Died: January 23, 1983 (aged 64); West Orange, New Jersey, U.S.
- Batted: Left Threw: Left

MLB debut
- October 3, 1943, for the Pittsburgh Pirates

Last MLB appearance
- September 16, 1945, for the Pittsburgh Pirates

MLB statistics
- Win–loss record: 3–5
- Earned run average: 4.55
- Strikeouts: 51
- Stats at Baseball Reference

Teams
- Pittsburgh Pirates (1943–1945)

Arthur Joseph "Cookie" Cuccurullo (February 8, 1918 – January 23, 1983) was an American Major League Baseball pitcher who played for the Pittsburgh Pirates from 1943 to 1945. The 5 ft 10 in (1.78 m), 168 lb (76 kg) left-hander was a native of Asbury Park, New Jersey, United States.

Cuccurullo began his career in 1939 with the Class D Greeneville Burley Cubs of the Appalachian League, and went 14–8 with them. After spending 1940 in the Class D farm system, he spent the next three seasons in the Pittsburgh Pirates' farm system. In 1943, he won 20 games for the Albany Senators.

Cuccurullo is one of many ballplayers who only appeared in the major leagues during World War II. He made his major league debut on October 3, 1943. It was the last day of the season, and Cuccurullo started the second game of a doubleheader against the Philadelphia Blue Jays at Forbes Field. He gave up 7 runs (5 earned) in 7 innings and the Pirates lost 11–3. The opposing pitcher (and winner) was 17-year-old rookie Roger McKee, who was making his first and only major league start.

In three seasons Cuccurullo appeared in a total of 62 games and had a 3–5 record, 9 games started, 0 complete games, 25 games finished, and 5 saves. All three of his wins came in relief – two against the New York Giants, and one against the Philadelphia Phillies. He allowed 86 earned runs in 170 innings pitched for a final ERA of 4.55.

Cuccurullo died at the age of 64 in West Orange, New Jersey.
