= 1944 Cincinnati Reds season =

1944 Cincinnati Reds
- League: National League
- Ballpark: Crosley Field
- City: Cincinnati
- Owners: Powel Crosley Jr.
- General managers: Warren Giles
- Managers: Bill McKechnie
- Radio: WSAI (Roger Baker, Dick Bray); WKRC (Waite Hoyt, Dick Nesbitt)

The 1944 Cincinnati Reds season was a season in American baseball. It consisted of the Cincinnati Reds attempting to win the National League, although finishing in third place. They finished the season with 89 wins and 65 losses.

== Offseason ==
- Prior to 1944 season (exact date unknown)
  - Kent Peterson was signed as an amateur free agent by the Reds.
  - Kermit Wahl was signed as an amateur free agent by the Reds.

== Regular season ==
On June 10, Joe Nuxhall made his major league debut. At age 15, he is (as of the 2022 season) the youngest confirmed player ever to play Major League Baseball. He pitched just two-thirds of an inning, giving up 5 runs on 2 hits and 5 walks. He would not appear in the majors again until 1952.

=== Season standings ===
National League
Team	W	L	Pct.	GB	Home	Road
St. Louis Cardinals	105	49	.682	—	54‍–‍22	51‍–‍27
Pittsburgh Pirates	90	63	.588	14½	49‍–‍28	41‍–‍35
Cincinnati Reds	89	65	.578	16	45‍–‍33	44‍–‍32
Chicago Cubs	75	79	.487	30	35‍–‍42	40‍–‍37
New York Giants	67	87	.435	38	39‍–‍36	28‍–‍51
Boston Braves	65	89	.422	40	38‍–‍40	27‍–‍49
Brooklyn Dodgers	63	91	.409	42	37‍–‍39	26‍–‍52
Philadelphia Phillies	61	92	.399	43½	29‍–‍49	32‍–‍43

=== Record vs. opponents ===
1944 National League record Sources:
Team	BSN	BRO	CHC	CIN	NYG	PHI	PIT	STL
Boston	—	9–13	11–11	8–14	9–13	11–11–1	9–13	8–14
Brooklyn	13–9	—	8–14–1	8–14	10–12	16–6	4–18	4–18
Chicago	11–11	14–8–1	—	9–13–1	10–12	13–9	12–10–1	6–16
Cincinnati	14–8	14–8	13–9–1	—	15–7	13–19	12–10	8–14
New York	13–9	12–10	12–10	7–15	—	10–12	7–15–1	6–16
Philadelphia	11–11–1	6–16	9–13	9–13	12–10	—	9–12	5–17
Pittsburgh	13–9	18–4	10–12–1	10–12	15–7–1	12–9	—	12–10–3
St. Louis	14–8	18–4	16–6	14–8	16–6	17–5	10–12–3	—

=== Roster ===
1944 Cincinnati Reds
Roster
Pitchers: 43 Joe Beggs; 33 Arnold Carter; 42 Tommy de la Cruz; 28 Jake Eisenhart; 39 Bob Ferguson; 44 Howie Fox; 37 Harry Gumbert; 34 Ed Heusser; 35 Bob Katz; 35 Jim Konstanty; 43 Bill Lohrman; 38 Bob Malloy; 43 Joe Nuxhall; 39 Kent Peterson; 41 Elmer Riddle; 29,36 Clyde Shoun; 31 Bucky Walters	Catchers: 5 Joe Just; 7 Ray Mueller; 6 Len Rice; 6 Johnny Riddle; Infielders: 14 Chuck Aleno; -- Jodie Beeler; 18 Buck Fausett; 10 Frank McCormick; 16 Steve Mesner; 11 Eddie Miller; 12 Kermit Wahl; 17 Woody Williams	Outfielders: 20 Dain Clay; 3 Estel Crabtree; 22 Tony Criscola; 21 Max Marshall; 24 Chucho Ramos; 23 Eric Tipton; 27 Gee Walker; 21 Jo-Jo White; Other batters: 26 Mike Kosman; 4 Al Lakeman	Manager: 1 Bill McKechnie; Coaches: 3 Estel Crabtree; 2 Hans Lobert; 8 Jimmie Wilson

== Player stats ==
= Indicates team leader

=== Batting ===
==== Starters by position ====
Note: Pos = Position; G = Games played; AB = At bats; H = Hits; Avg. = Batting average; HR = Home runs; RBI = Runs batted in

Pos	Player	G	AB	H	Avg.	HR	RBI
C	Ray Mueller	155	555	159	.286	10	73
1B	Frank McCormick	153	581	177	.305	20	102
2B	Woody Williams	155	653	157	.240	1	35
3B	Steve Mesner	121	414	100	.242	1	47
SS	Eddie Miller	155	536	112	.209	4	55
OF	Gee Walker	121	478	133	.278	5	62
OF	Eric Tipton	140	479	144	.301	3	36
OF	Dain Clay	110	356	89	.250	0	17

==== Other batters ====
Note: G = Games played; AB = At bats; H = Hits; Avg. = Batting average; HR = Home runs; RBI = Runs batted in

Player	G	AB	H	Avg.	HR	RBI
Max Marshall	66	229	56	.245	4	23
Tony Criscola	64	157	36	.229	0	14
Chuck Aleno	50	127	21	.165	1	15
Estel Crabtree	58	98	28	.286	0	11
Jo-Jo White	24	85	20	.235	0	5
Buck Fausett	13	31	3	.097	0	1
Joe Just	11	11	2	.182	0	0
Chucho Ramos	4	10	5	.500	0	0
Len Rice	10	4	0	.000	0	0
Jodie Beeler	3	3	0	.000	0	0
Al Lakeman	1	1	0	.000	0	0
Kermit Wahl	4	1	0	.000	0	0
Mike Kosman	1	0	0	----	0	0
Johnny Riddle	1	0	0	----	0	0

=== Pitching ===
= Indicates league leader

==== Starting pitchers ====
Note: G = Games pitched; IP = Innings pitched; W = Wins; L = Losses; ERA = Earned run average; SO = Strikeouts

Player	G	IP	W	L	ERA	SO
Bucky Walters	34	285.0	23	8	2.40	77
Ed Heusser	30	192.2	13	11	2.38	42
Harry Gumbert	24	155.1	10	8	3.30	40
Elmer Riddle	4	26.2	2	2	4.05	6
Joe Beggs	1	9.0	1	0	2.00	2

==== Other pitchers ====
Note: G = Games pitched; IP = Innings pitched; W = Wins; L = Losses; ERA = Earned run average; SO = Strikeouts

Player	G	IP	W	L	ERA	SO
Clyde Shoun	38	202.2	13	10	3.02	55
Tommy de la Cruz	34	191.1	9	9	3.25	65
Arnold Carter	33	148.2	11	7	2.60	33
Jim Konstanty	20	112.2	6	4	2.80	19
Bob Ferguson	9	16.0	0	3	9.00	9
Bob Katz	6	18.1	0	1	3.93	4
Bill Lohrman	2	1.2	0	1	27.00	0

==== Relief pitchers ====
Note: G = Games pitched; W = Wins; L = Losses; SV = Saves; ERA = Earned run average; SO = Strikeouts

Player	G	W	L	SV	ERA	SO
Bob Malloy	9	1	1	0	3.09	4
Buck Fausett	2	0	0	0	5.91	3
Howie Fox	2	0	0	0	0.00	0
Kent Peterson	1	0	0	0	0.00	0
Joe Nuxhall	1	0	0	0	67.50	0
Jake Eisenhart	1	0	0	0	0.00	0

== Farm system ==
Level	Team	League	Manager
AA	Syracuse Chiefs	International League	Jewel Ens
A1	Birmingham Barons	Southern Association	Johnny Riddle and Ted Petoskey
