= 1944 Chicago Cubs season =

1944 Chicago Cubs
- League: National League
- Ballpark: Wrigley Field
- City: Chicago
- Record: 75–79 (.487)
- League place: 4th
- Owners: Philip K. Wrigley
- General managers: James T. Gallagher
- Managers: Jimmie Wilson, Roy Johnson, Charlie Grimm
- Radio: WJJD (Bert Wilson)

The 1944 Chicago Cubs season was the 73rd season of the Chicago Cubs franchise, the 69th in the National League and the 29th at Wrigley Field. The Cubs finished fourth in the National League with a record of 75–79.

== Offseason ==
- Prior to 1944 season (exact date unknown)
  - Smoky Burgess was signed as an amateur free agent by the Cubs.
  - Jim Pearce was signed as an amateur free agent by the Cubs.

== Regular season ==
=== Season standings ===
National League
Team	W	L	Pct.	GB	Home	Road
St. Louis Cardinals	105	49	.682	—	54‍–‍22	51‍–‍27
Pittsburgh Pirates	90	63	.588	14½	49‍–‍28	41‍–‍35
Cincinnati Reds	89	65	.578	16	45‍–‍33	44‍–‍32
Chicago Cubs	75	79	.487	30	35‍–‍42	40‍–‍37
New York Giants	67	87	.435	38	39‍–‍36	28‍–‍51
Boston Braves	65	89	.422	40	38‍–‍40	27‍–‍49
Brooklyn Dodgers	63	91	.409	42	37‍–‍39	26‍–‍52
Philadelphia Phillies	61	92	.399	43½	29‍–‍49	32‍–‍43

=== Record vs. opponents ===
1944 National League record Sources:
Team	BSN	BRO	CHC	CIN	NYG	PHI	PIT	STL
Boston	—	9–13	11–11	8–14	9–13	11–11–1	9–13	8–14
Brooklyn	13–9	—	8–14–1	8–14	10–12	16–6	4–18	4–18
Chicago	11–11	14–8–1	—	9–13–1	10–12	13–9	12–10–1	6–16
Cincinnati	14–8	14–8	13–9–1	—	15–7	13–19	12–10	8–14
New York	13–9	12–10	12–10	7–15	—	10–12	7–15–1	6–16
Philadelphia	11–11–1	6–16	9–13	9–13	12–10	—	9–12	5–17
Pittsburgh	13–9	18–4	10–12–1	10–12	15–7–1	12–9	—	12–10–3
St. Louis	14–8	18–4	16–6	14–8	16–6	17–5	10–12–3	—

=== Notable transactions ===
- June 6, 1944: Eddie Stanky was traded by the Cubs to the Brooklyn Dodgers for Bob Chipman.
- July 5, 1944: Jimmie Foxx was released by the Cubs.

=== Roster ===
1944 Chicago Cubs
Roster
Pitchers: 47 Dale Alderson; 36 John Burrows; 31 Bob Chipman; 30 Paul Derringer; 37 Paul Erickson; 32 Bill Fleming; -- Charlie Gassaway; 34 Ed Hanyzewski; 39 Red Lynn; 39 Hank Miklos; 13 Claude Passeau; 38 Mack Stewart; 35 Hy Vandenberg; 33 Hank Wyse	Catchers: 12 Roy Easterwood; 24 Paul Gillespie; 10 Billy Holm; 11 Mickey Kreitner; 50 Joe Stephenson; 12 Dewey Williams; Infielders: 26 Charlie Brewster; 44 Phil Cavarretta; 52 Pete Elko; 26 Jimmie Foxx; 25 Stan Hack; 23 Roy Hughes; 20 Don Johnson; 21 Lennie Merullo; 22 Bill Schuster; 25 Eddie Stanky; 24 Tony York	Outfielders: 46 Dom Dallessandro; 51 Ival Goodman; 43 Bill Nicholson; 45 Lou Novikoff; 50 Johnny Ostrowski; 48 Andy Pafko; 49 Ed Sauer; 49 Frank Secory; Other batters: 38,45 Garth Mann	Manager: 40 Charlie Grimm; 42 Roy Johnson; 40 Jimmie Wilson; Coaches: 26 Jimmie Foxx; 42 Roy Johnson; 41 Milt Stock

== Player stats ==
= Indicates team leader

= Indicates league leader

=== Batting ===
==== Starters by position ====
Note: Pos = Position; G = Games played; AB = At bats; H = Hits; Avg. = Batting average; HR = Home runs; RBI = Runs batted in

Pos	Player	G	AB	H	Avg.	HR	RBI
C	Dewey Williams	79	262	63	.240	0	27
1B	Phil Cavarretta	152	614	197*	.321	5	82
2B	Don Johnson	154	608	169	.278	2	71
SS	Lennie Merullo	66	193	41	.212	1	16
3B	Stan Hack	98	383	108	.282	3	32
OF	Andy Pafko	128	469	126	.269	6	62
OF	Bill Nicholson	156	582	167	.287	33	122
OF	Dom Dallessandro	117	381	116	.304	8	74

- Tied with Stan Musial (St. Louis)

==== Other batters ====
Note: G = Games played; AB = At bats; H = Hits; Avg. = Batting average; HR = Home runs; RBI = Runs batted in

Player	G	AB	H	Avg.	HR	RBI
Roy Hughes	126	478	137	.287	1	28
Bill Schuster	60	154	34	.221	1	14
Ival Goodman	62	141	37	.262	1	16
Lou Novikoff	71	139	39	.281	3	19
Billy Holm	54	132	18	.136	0	6
Mickey Kreitner	39	85	13	.153	0	1
Tony York	28	85	20	.235	0	7
Frank Secory	22	56	18	.321	4	17
Ed Sauer	23	50	11	.220	0	5
Charlie Brewster	10	44	11	.250	0	2
Roy Easterwood	17	33	7	.212	1	2
Paul Gillespie	9	26	7	.269	1	2
Eddie Stanky	13	25	6	.240	0	0
Pete Elko	7	22	5	.227	0	0
Jimmie Foxx	15	20	1	.050	0	2
Johnny Ostrowski	8	13	2	.154	0	2
Joe Stephenson	4	8	1	.125	0	0
Garth Mann	1	0	0	----	0	0

=== Pitching ===
==== Starting pitchers ====
Note: G = Games pitched; IP = Innings pitched; W = Wins; L = Losses; ERA = Earned run average; SO = Strikeouts

Player	G	IP	W	L	ERA	SO
Hank Wyse	41	257.1	16	15	3.15	86
Claude Passeau	34	227.0	15	9	2.89	89
Bob Chipman	26	129.0	9	9	3.49	41
Charlie Gassaway	2	11.2	0	1	7.71	7

==== Other pitchers ====
Note: G = Games pitched; IP = Innings pitched; W = Wins; L = Losses; ERA = Earned run average; SO = Strikeouts

Player	G	IP	W	L	ERA	SO
Paul Derringer	42	180.0	7	13	4.15	69
Bill Fleming	39	158.1	9	10	3.13	42
Hy Vandenberg	35	126.1	7	4	3.63	54
Paul Erickson	33	124.1	5	9	3.55	82
Red Lynn	22	84.1	5	4	4.06	35
Ed Hanyzewski	14	58.1	2	5	4.47	19

==== Relief pitchers ====
Note: G = Games pitched; W = Wins; L = Losses; SV = Saves; ERA = Earned run average; SO = Strikeouts

Player	G	W	L	SV	ERA	SO
Dale Alderson	12	0	0	0	6.65	7
Mack Stewart	8	0	0	0	1.46	3
John Burrows	3	0	0	0	18.00	1
Hank Miklos	2	0	0	0	7.71	0

== Farm system ==
Level	Team	League	Manager
AA	Los Angeles Angels	Pacific Coast League	Bill Sweeney
A1	Nashville Vols	Southern Association	Larry Gilbert
B	Portsmouth Cubs	Piedmont League	Bill Steinecke and Jimmie Foxx
D	Erwin Cubs	Appalachian League	Jim Poole
D	Marion Diggers	Ohio State League	Grover Hartley
D	Lockport Cubs	PONY League	Greg Mulleavy

LEAGUE CHAMPIONS: Nashville
