= 1944 in baseball =

The following are the baseball events of the year 1944 throughout the world.

== Champions ==
=== Major League Baseball ===
- MLB World Series: St. Louis Cardinals over St. Louis Browns (4–2), in the "Streetcar Series"
- Negro League World Series: Homestead Grays over Birmingham Black Barons (4–1)
- MLB All-Star Game, July 11 at Forbes Field: National League, 7–1
- Negro League Baseball All-Star Game: West, 7–4

=== Other champions ===
- Amateur World Series: Venezuela
- All-American Girls Professional Baseball League: Milwaukee Chicks over Kenosha Comets

== Awards and honors ==
- Baseball Hall of Fame
  - Kenesaw Mountain Landis
- Most Valuable Player
  - Hal Newhouser (AL) – pitcher, Detroit Tigers
  - Marty Marion (NL) – shortstop, St. Louis Cardinals
- The Sporting News Player of the Year Award
  - Marty Marion (NL) – St. Louis Cardinals
- The Sporting News Most Valuable Player Award
  - Bobby Doerr (AL) – Second base, Boston Red Sox
  - Marty Marion (NL) – Shortstop, St. Louis Cardinals
- The Sporting News Pitcher of the Year Award
  - Hal Newhouser (AL) – Detroit Tigers
  - Bill Voiselle (NL) – New York Giants
- The Sporting News Manager of the Year Award
  - Luke Sewell (AL) – St. Louis Browns

== Statistical leaders ==
	American League		National League		Negro American League		Negro National League	
Stat	Player	Total	Player	Total	Player	Total	Player	Total
AVG	Lou Boudreau (CLE)	.327	Dixie Walker (BRO)	.357	Jesse Douglas (CAG)	.327	Roy Campanella (BEG/PHS)	.388
HR	Nick Etten (NYY)	22	Bill Nicholson (CHC)	33	Bonnie Serrell (KCM)	4	Josh Gibson (HOM)	9
RBI	Vern Stephens (SLB)	109	Bill Nicholson (CHC)	122	Lee Moody (KCM)	26	Marvin Williams (PHS)	50
W	Hal Newhouser (DET)	29	Bucky Walters (CIN)	23	Verdell Mathis (MEM)	7	Bill Ricks (PHS)	11
ERA	Dizzy Trout (DET)	2.12	Ed Heusser (CIN)	2.38	Robert Keyes^{1} (MEM)	0.64	Donald Troy (BEG)	1.63
K	Hal Newhouser (DET)	187	Bill Voiselle (NYG)	161	Satchel Paige (KCM)	105	Bill Ricks (PHS)	103

^{1} All-time single-season earned run average record

== Major league baseball final standings ==
=== American League final standings ===
American League
Team	W	L	Pct.	GB	Home	Road
St. Louis Browns	89	65	.578	—	54‍–‍23	35‍–‍42
Detroit Tigers	88	66	.571	1	43‍–‍34	45‍–‍32
New York Yankees	83	71	.539	6	47‍–‍31	36‍–‍40
Boston Red Sox	77	77	.500	12	47‍–‍30	30‍–‍47
Cleveland Indians	72	82	.468	17	39‍–‍38	33‍–‍44
Philadelphia Athletics	72	82	.468	17	39‍–‍37	33‍–‍45
Chicago White Sox	71	83	.461	18	41‍–‍36	30‍–‍47
Washington Senators	64	90	.416	25	40‍–‍37	24‍–‍53

Locations of teams for the 1942–1953 American League seasons
American League

=== National League final standings ===
National League
Team	W	L	Pct.	GB	Home	Road
St. Louis Cardinals	105	49	.682	—	54‍–‍22	51‍–‍27
Pittsburgh Pirates	90	63	.588	14½	49‍–‍28	41‍–‍35
Cincinnati Reds	89	65	.578	16	45‍–‍33	44‍–‍32
Chicago Cubs	75	79	.487	30	35‍–‍42	40‍–‍37
New York Giants	67	87	.435	38	39‍–‍36	28‍–‍51
Boston Braves	65	89	.422	40	38‍–‍40	27‍–‍49
Brooklyn Dodgers	63	91	.409	42	37‍–‍39	26‍–‍52
Philadelphia Phillies	61	92	.399	43½	29‍–‍49	32‍–‍43

Locations of teams for the 1943–1952 National League seasons
National League

== Negro league baseball final standings ==
All Negro leagues standings below are per MLB and Seamheads.

=== Negro American League final standings ===
vs. Negro American League					vs. Major Black teams			
Negro American League	W	L	Pct.	GB	W	L	T	Pct.
Birmingham Black Barons	50	24	.676	—	71	42	0	.628
Cincinnati–Indianapolis Clowns	46	31	.597	5½	59	54	1	.522
Cleveland Buckeyes	42	41	.506	12½	59	56	1	.513
Memphis Red Sox	44	55	.444	18½	65	78	0	.455
Chicago American Giants	31	43	.419	19	43	72	1	.375
Kansas City Monarchs	26	45	.366	22½	49	74	0	.398

Locations of teams for the 1944–1945 Negro American League seasons
Negro American League
Note: Clowns play in both Cincinnati and Indianapolis.

=== Negro National League final standings ===
vs. Negro National League						vs. Major Black teams			
Negro National League	W	L	T	Pct.	GB	W	L	T	Pct.
Homestead Grays	25	17	1	.593	—	66	32	4	.667
Philadelphia Stars	26	18	0	.591	—	37	29	1	.560
New York Cubans	20	17	1	.538	2½	53	29	2	.643
Baltimore Elite Giants	26	23	0	.531	2½	47	43	1	.522
Newark Eagles	23	23	0	.500	4	34	37	0	.479
New York Black Yankees	5	27	0	.156	15	11	39	1	.225

Locations of teams for the 1944–1947 Negro National League seasons
Negro National League
Note: Homestead Grays played in both Washington, D.C. and Pittsburgh, with the majority in Washington, D.C.

=== Negro World Series ===
- 1944 Negro World Series: Homestead Grays over Birmingham Black Barons 4–1.

=== Independent teams final standings ===
The Atlanta Black Crackers and Jacksonville Red Caps played against the two leagues.

vs. All Teams
Independent Clubs	W	L	T	Pct.	GB
Atlanta Black Crackers	5	9	2	.375	—
Jacksonville Red Caps	0	4	0	.000	—

== All-American Girls Professional Baseball League final standings ==
=== First half ===
Rank	Team	W	L	Pct.	GB
1	Kenosha Comets	36	23	.610	—
2	South Bend Blue Sox	33	25	.569	2½
3	Milwaukee Chicks	30	26	.536	4½
4	Racine Belles	28	32	.467	8½
5	Rockford Peaches	24	32	.429	10½
6	Minneapolis Millerettes	23	36	.390	13

=== Second half ===
Rank	Team	W	L	Pct.	GB
1	Milwaukee Chicks	40	19	.678	—
2	South Bend Blue Sox	31	27	.534	8½
3	Rockford Peaches	29	28	.509	10
4	Kenosha Comets	26	31	.456	13
5	Racine Belles	25	32	.439	14
6	Minneapolis Millerettes	22	36	.379	17½

=== Composite records ===
Rank	Team	W	L	Pct.	GB
1	Milwaukee Chicks	70	45	.609	—
2	South Bend Blue Sox	64	52	.552	6½
3	Kenosha Comets	62	54	.469	8½
4	Rockford Peaches	53	60	.456	16
5	Racine Belles	53	64	.453	18
6	Minneapolis Millerettes	45	72	.385	26½

== Events ==
=== January ===
- January 4 – A nationally syndicated newspaper article penned by American League president Will Harridge expresses confidence that the 1944 MLB season will go forward despite the loss of manpower to World War II service. With an estimated 190 AL players now in the military, and anticipating the departure of "scores of players" for the fighting ranks in 1944, Harridge writes that his league's owners believe that "their clubs will be able to field teams, and again do a good job of providing entertainment and relaxation."
- January 14 – The Chicago Cubs sign minor-league free agent pitcher Russ Meyer, who had been released by the cross-town White Sox after contracting appendicitis and peritonitis while serving stateside in the U.S. Army in 1943. Granted a medical discharge, Meyer, 20, will return to pro baseball this season with the Nashville Vols of the Southern Association, and eventually spend all or part of 13 seasons (1946–1957, 1959) in the majors.
- January 25 – Manpower concerns driven by World War II and the military draft have reached such proportions that St. Louis Cardinals owner Sam Breadon publicly frets that he won't be able to field a team when the season opens in April. National League chief Ford Frick responds, "As long as we have nine men to a team, we should play ball". Breadon's 1944 Cardinals will have enough talent to win 105 games, their third straight pennant, and the 1944 World Series.
- January 27 – Casey Stengel quits under fire as manager of the Boston Braves, less than a week after the financially struggling club is purchased by local heavy construction magnates Lou Perini, C. Joseph Maney and Guido Rugo—nicknamed the "Three Little Steam Shovels." Stengel, 53, has directed the Braves to a 373–491–6 (.432) record since 1938, missing part of 1943 while recovering from a broken leg. Bob Coleman, a Boston coach who was acting manager during that medical leave of absence, will be named Stengel's full-fledged successor on February 12.
- January 31 – The New York Giants sign minor-league free agent outfielder Danny Gardella, 23. Classified "4-F" due to a punctured eardrum and exempt from military service, he has been playing semi-professionally in New York City since 1941. Gardella will bat .268 in 168 games as a Giant from May 14, 1944, to September 30, 1945, before becoming a central figure in the Mexican League "raids" of 1946; in October 1948, he will file (and eventually settle out of court) a lawsuit challenging baseball's reserve clause.

=== February ===
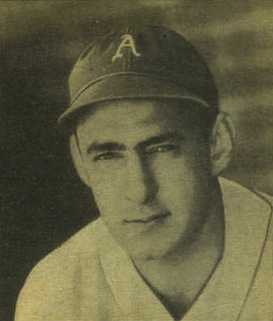
Frankie Hayes

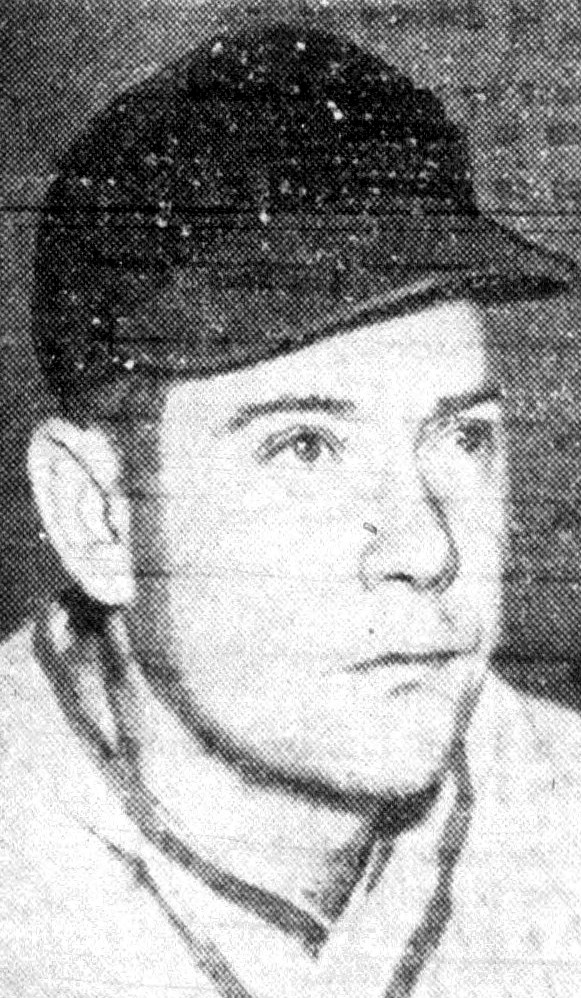
Ray Mueller

- February 2 – Opposition is swift after maverick owner Alva Bradley of the Cleveland Indians repeats his 1942 contention that baseball should suspend operations for the duration of World War II "rather than promote a farce" by employing inferior players to fill out war-depleted rosters. Owners and executives such as Ed Barrow, Eddie Collins, Grace Comiskey, Warren Giles, Clark Griffith, Connie Mack and Branch Rickey strongly reject Bradley's suggestion. "I'm not alarmed," says Washington's Griffith, who was instrumental in securing a "green light" for baseball from Franklin Delano Roosevelt in 1942 after the U.S. entered the conflict. "We'll play until we have no players left."
- February 6 – A committee composed of major and minor league owners and Commissioner of Baseball Kenesaw Mountain Landis announces a series of provisions designed to protect the interests of players now on clubs' "National Defense Lists" when they return to the game from military service. Provisions include prohibition of pay cuts for returning veterans, granting them more training time to get back into playing shape, and limiting clubs' rights to demote them to minor-league clubs.
- February 14 – Local industrialist Max C. Meyer halts his bid to purchase 75% control of the Brooklyn Dodgers when, at the 11th hour, additional "financial burdens" raise the asking price above the $1.01 million the jewelry manufacturer is willing to pay. The collapse of Meyer's offer means that three-quarters of the Dodgers' stock will continue to be managed by the Brooklyn Trust Company.
- February 17 – The Philadelphia Athletics acquire catcher Frankie Hayes from the St. Louis Browns for pitcher Sam Zoldak and minor-league outfielder Barney Lutz. Hayes, with Ray Mueller, is one of wartime baseball's two "iron men" catchers known for starting every one of his team's official games during the upcoming regular season; in 155 contests, he will catch 1,333 full innings and 135 complete games, with the Athletics' four backup backstops combining for only 16 innings among them.

=== March ===
- March 1 – The St. Louis Browns trade catcher Rick Ferrell to the Washington Senators in exchange for catcher Tony Giuliani. However, Giuliani, who'd played for St. Louis during the 1936 and 1937 seasons, refuses to report. Washington completes the trade by sending outfielder Gene Moore to St. Louis in Giuliani's place.
- March 4 – Philadelphia's National League franchise, founded in 1883 and known as the Phillies since 1886 (and as the Phils in 1942), announces the winning entry of a "re-name that team" fan contest, adopting the Philadelphia Blue Jays as its new identity. The winning name is suggested by Mrs. John Crooks of Philadelphia (and six other fans) from 634 entries and over 5,000 letters. Yet the "Phillies" nickname won't go away; it will remain the team's alternate identity and appear on the varsity's uniform shirts during the "Blue Jays" experiment until that ends in January 1950.
- March 11 – The 16 major league clubs prepare to open spring training camps, juggling concerns about players being drafted into military service, talent shortages, and workout facilities that, in the colder northern cities, demand indoor drills and weathering chilly, wet outdoor conditions. In New York, veteran Giants' shortstop Billy Jurges holds out to protest a pay cut of almost 10 percent; the Yankees learn that five-time All-Star second baseman Joe Gordon expects to be inducted into the armed services on March 16; and the Brooklyn Dodgers delay opening their Bear Mountain training camp until March 19.
- March 12 – After local baseball fans raise more than $15,000 for the purpose, Williamsport rejoins the Eastern League after a one-year absence. The new owners acquire the former Springfield Rifles franchise and transfer it to the Pennsylvania city. Williamsport gives the Class A Eastern circuit its eighth franchise for 1944.

=== April ===
- April 8 – The warm-weather Pacific Coast League begins its 170-game season; by the time all the minor leagues debut in the coming days, there are only ten loops active in "Organized Baseball", plus the independent Mexican League. The "Class E" Twin Ports League of 1943 vanishes, and is replaced by the Class D Ohio State League.
- April 13 – The Philadelphia Phillies obtain first baseman Tony Lupien on waivers from the Boston Red Sox. Harvard alumnus Lupien, 26, will appear in 153 games as the Phils' first-sacker in 1944 before entering the U. S. Navy.
- April 15 – Al Simmons, 41, returns to the Philadelphia Athletics, signing a free-agent contract. The future Hall of Famer, one of the brightest stars of Connie Mack's 1929–1931 dynasty, will appear in only four games in his third stint with the Athletics before drawing his release June 15 to join Mack's coaching staff.
- April 18 – Overshadowed by World War II, the 1944 MLB season begins with seven games featuring 14 of the 16 big-league teams.
  - In the American League, the world-champion New York Yankees shut out the Boston Red Sox, 3–0, behind Hank Borowy at Fenway Park; Vern Stephens' ninth-inning home run delivers a 2–1 win for the visiting St. Louis Browns against the Detroit Tigers at Briggs Stadium; and the Philadelphia Athletics eke out a 3–2 triumph over the Washington Senators at Griffith Stadium.
  - In the National League, the Chicago Cubs get only three hits, but Hank Wyse blanks the Cincinnati Reds, 3–0, at Crosley Field, before a sell-out crowd of 30,154, most in the majors; Bill Voiselle of the New York Giants bests Al Javery of the Boston Braves, 2–1, at the Polo Grounds; "Kewpie Dick" Barrett of the Philadelphia Phillies throws a 4–1 complete-game victory against the Brooklyn Dodgers at Shibe Park; and the defending NL champion St. Louis Cardinals throttle the Pittsburgh Pirates, 2–0, behind Max Lanier's two-hitter at Sportsman's Park.
- April 20 – A bomber piloted by United States Army Air Forces Captain Elmer Gedeon is shot down by enemy aircraft over France. Gedeon, 27, an outfielder who appeared in five games for the Washington Senators between September 18–23, 1939, becomes the first active MLB player killed in World War II. When his body is returned to the United States after the war, Gedeon will be buried at Arlington National Cemetery.
- April 27 – At Braves Field, Jim Tobin of the Boston Braves no-hits the Brooklyn Dodgers 2–0 and helps his own cause by homering off Fritz Ostermueller in the eighth inning. Tobin becomes the second no-hit pitcher to hit a home run in the same game, joining Wes Ferrell almost a full 13 years earlier, on April 29, 1931.
- April 30:
  - Coming up a single short of hitting for the cycle, New York Giants first baseman Phil Weintraub drives in 11 runs on two doubles, a triple, and his first home run of 1944, in a 26–8 trouncing of the Brooklyn Dodgers at the Polo Grounds. Teammate Ernie Lombardi drives in seven runs himself. Weintraub and Lombardi will finish 1–2 in most RBIs by a player in a single game during the 1944 MLB campaign.
  - After his Chicago Cubs drop their eighth and ninth straight games—a double dip, 5–0 and 7–5, to the juggernaut St. Louis Cardinals at Sportsman's Park—manager Jimmie Wilson is dismissed. Chicago's only NL victory of 1944 came on Opening Day on April 18, and Wilson's mark over 3+ seasons is 213–258–3 (.452). Coach Roy Johnson will handle the team for its next game, May 3, as the Cubs make arrangements to bring Wrigley Field favorite Charlie Grimm back for a second term as manager.

=== May ===
- May 1 – George Myatt of the Washington Senators goes 6-for-6, including a double, as the Nats beat the Boston Red Sox, 11–4, at Fenway Park.
- May 2 – Forty-year-old Pepper Martin appears in a St. Louis Cardinals box score for the first time since September 27, 1940, when he starts today in center field in a road game against the Pittsburgh Pirates. Martin spent 1941–1943 as a player–manager in the St. Louis farm system, but the wartime manpower shortage gives "The Wild Horse of the Osage" one more big-league fling in 1944; he'll appear in 40 games as an outfielder and pinch hitter and collect 24 hits, including two home runs, before he's released October 10.
- May 4 – The St. Louis Browns announce that they are dropping their segregation policy that restricts Black fans to Sportsman's Park's bleachers.
- May 7:
  - Good-natured Charlie Grimm, who led the Chicago Cubs to two National League pennants (1932, 1935) during his previous, seven-year stint as manager, takes the reins of the club for a second time. The Cubs have suffered a calamitous start to their 1944 season: they're 1–10 and already seven games out of first place when "Jolly Cholly", 45, assumes command. They lose their 11th and 12th straight games today, dropping a twin bill to the Pittsburgh Pirates.
    - Before Grimm takes on the Chicago assignment, he must find his own successor as pilot of the Milwaukee Brewers of the American Association. Grimm is a co-owner of the minor-league Brewers, along with 30-year-old Bill Veeck, currently serving in the United States Marines in the Pacific Theatre of World War II. Grimm's choice: unemployed manager Casey Stengel, recently fired by the Boston Braves. Veeck is furious when he hears of the hiring; he writes to Grimm: "Stengel is entirely satisfied with a mediocre club as long as Stengel and his alleged wit are appreciated." But Stengel takes over Grimm's 11–2 Brewers and guides them to a 91–49 record and the Association pennant. Grimm, meanwhile, eventually coaxes the Cubs to a respectable 74–69 mark.
  - The Boston Red Sox acquire catcher Hal Wagner from the Philadelphia Athletics for outfielder Ford Garrison. Wagner, 28, a 1943 AL All-Star, will be the Red Sox' primary catcher during their 1946 pennant-winning season.
- May 10 – Mel Harder becomes the 50th pitcher in major league history to win 200 games as the Cleveland Indians defeat the Boston Red Sox, 5–4.
- May 11 – Hal Trosky's steal of home proves to be the winning run in the Chicago White Sox' 16-inning, 4–2 triumph over the Philadelphia Athletics at Shibe Park.
- May 15 – At Crosley Field, Clyde Shoun of the Cincinnati Reds no-hits the Boston Braves 1–0. The only baserunner he allows is a third-inning walk to his mound opponent, Jim Tobin, himself a no-hit pitcher only 18 days earlier.
- May 17 – Future Hall-of-Fame second baseman Bobby Doerr hits for the cycle, to help his Boston Red Sox defeat the visiting St. Louis Browns, 12–8.
- May 30 – Outfielder Goody Rosen returns to the Brooklyn Dodgers after a five-year absence, when the Cincinnati Reds send him to Brooklyn for veteran hurlers Fritz Ostermueller and Bill Lohrman and $18,000 in cash. Rosen, now 31, had appeared in 214 games for the 1937–1939 Dodgers.

=== June ===
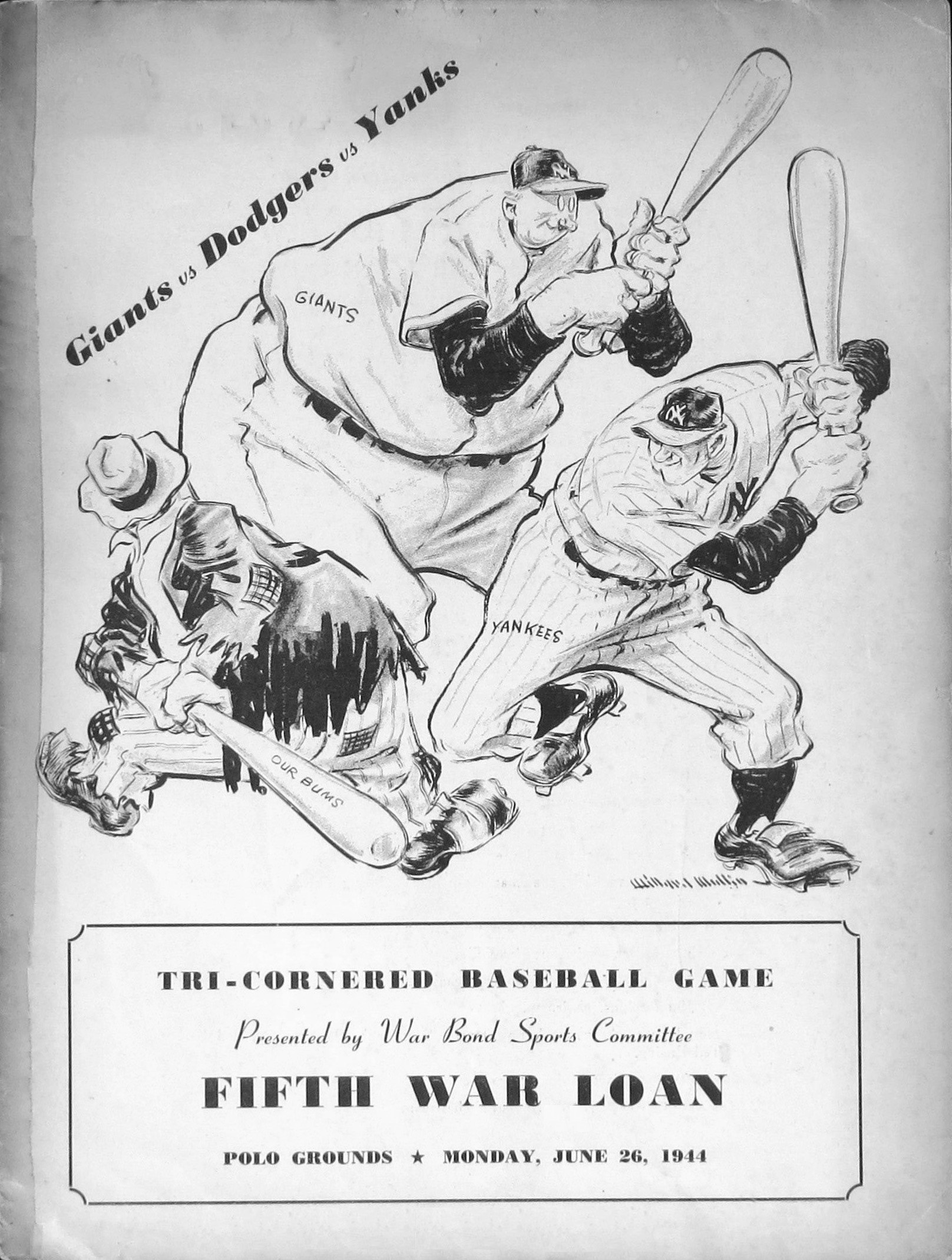
Scorecard for June 26's "Tri-Cornered Baseball Game." (Cartoon by Willard Mullin)

- June 1:
  - Stan Spence becomes the second member of the Washington Senators to go six-for-six this season in today's 11–5 romp over the St. Louis Browns at Sportsman's Park. Spence's feat occurs exactly a month after teammate George Myatt's.
  - Fritz Ostermueller's tenure with the Cincinnati Reds lasts only 48 hours when the 36-year-old left-hander is sold to the Pittsburgh Pirates before he can appear in an official game in a Cincinnati uniform.
- June 6:
  - All major-league games are cancelled due to D-Day. At least five baseball players serving the Allies' armed forces give their lives in the invasion of Normandy. One of the fallen, Technician Fifth Grade John Joseph Pinder, a former minor-league pitcher whose 32nd birthday is today, will be posthumously awarded the Medal of Honor for "conspicuous gallantry and intrepidity above and beyond the call of duty."
  - The Brooklyn Dodgers acquire second baseman Eddie Stanky from the Chicago Cubs in exchange for pitcher Bob Chipman.
- June 10:
  - At 15 years and 316 days of age, left-hander Joe Nuxhall becomes the youngest player to ever appear in a major league game. Nuxhall, who hails from nearby Hamilton, Ohio, enters the ninth inning of a game at Cincinnati's Crosley Field in which his Reds are already trailing the World Series-bound St. Louis Cardinals 13–0. After retiring two of the first three hitters he faces (George Fallon and Augie Bergamo), Nuxhall fails to record the third out, allowing two hits, five bases on balls and five earned runs before he's replaced by 21-year-old Jake Eisenhart, who's making his only MLB appearance. Nuxhall then vanishes into the minor leagues until he returns to the Reds in 1952, and (apart from a season and half) then remains with them as a pitcher (winning 130 games) and beloved broadcaster until his passing, at 79, in 2007.
  - With World War II calling most able-bodied men into military service or war-related industry, 1944 will see extremes in the number of very young and older players: twenty big-leaguers under the age of 20, and 16 over the age of 40, will see action in the American and National leagues this season.
- June 12 – The Philadelphia Phillies take player-coach Chuck Klein, 39, off their active roster, ending the former slugger's active career after 17 seasons, 2,076 hits and an even 300 homers. He'll be elected to the Hall of Fame by the Veterans' Committee in 1980.
- June 15 – The St. Louis Cardinals sell the contract of right-hander Harry Gumbert to the Cincinnati Reds.
- June 22 – At Braves Field, Boston starting pitcher Al Javery pitches scoreless ball into the top of the 15th inning before allowing a one-out, solo homer to the Philadelphia Phillies' Ron Northey. Javery's Braves are then held off the scoreboard in the bottom half and absorb a 1–0 defeat. The Phillies' Bill Lee (six innings) and reliever Charley Schanz (nine innings) combine for a six-hit shutout.
- June 26 – Fifty thousand fans pack the Polo Grounds to see New York City's trio of MLB teams play an unusual, three-team fund-raising exhibition contest: the Tri-Cornered Baseball Game. The bizarre competition (the final score: "Dodgers 5, Yankees 1, Giants 0") raises $6 million for U.S. War Bonds.

=== July ===
- July 5 – Fourteen-year minor-league veteran Bill McGhee makes his MLB debut as the wartime manpower shortage continues. McGhee goes three for five, all singles, and drives in a run, but his Philadelphia Athletics fall to the visiting St. Louis Browns, 4–2. The first baseman is 35 years and 304 days old; he's spent most of his career in Class B leagues in America's Deep South.
- July 6 – Outfielder Bob Johnson becomes the second member of the Boston Red Sox to hit for the cycle in 1944 in today's 13–3 rout of the Detroit Tigers at Fenway Park. Bobby Doerr, whose "cycle" came May 17, goes four-for-four today batting right behind Johnson.
- July 11:
  - At Forbes Field, home of the Pittsburgh Pirates, the National League defeats the American League, 7–1, in the All-Star Game. Three Senior Circuit relievers, winner Ken Raffensberger, Rip Sewell and Jim Tobin, limit the Americans to only one hit after the NL salts the game away with four fifth-inning runs.
  - At the midsummer break, both St. Louis teams lead their respective leagues. The defending NL-champion Cardinals (51–21–2) have a comfortable, 10½-game cushion over the Pittsburgh Pirates (49–30–4), while the surprising Browns (45–34), seeking their first AL pennant, hold a 2½-game margin over the Boston Red Sox (42–36).
- July 16 – At Braves Field, the Brooklyn Dodgers lose their 16th consecutive game, 8–4, to Boston before capturing the nightcap, 8–5, behind Curt Davis. Leo Durocher's wartime squad will then drop 12 of its next 16 games to finish 5–25 during the month of July 1944.

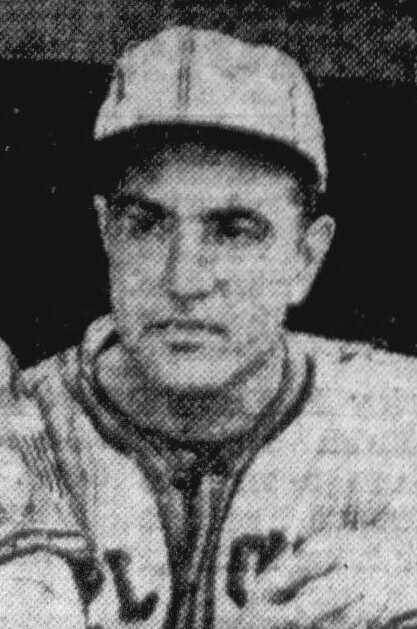
Nels Potter

- July 20 – After ignoring warnings from home plate umpire Cal Hubbard to stop putting his fingers in his mouth to wet the baseball, Nelson Potter of the St. Louis Browns is ejected in the fifth inning of today's 7–3 victory over the New York Yankees at Sportsman's Park. The game is delayed 15 minutes while Potter and manager Luke Sewell argue with Hubbard, and fans shower the field with debris. Potter will be fined and suspended for ten games by AL president Will Harridge. He becomes the first pitcher to be ejected for throwing a spitball since it was banned in 1920.
- July 23 – At the Polo Grounds, slugger Bill "Swish" Nicholson of the Chicago Cubs smacks three home runs and drives in four, spurring Chicago to a 7–4 win over the New York Giants. Nicholson, who'll lead the NL in homers and RBI in 1944, also enjoys the distinction of registering the season's only three-homer day.

=== August ===
- August 1 – The Pittsburgh Pirates rack up eight stolen bases against the Boston Braves before the game is suspended in the eighth inning so the visiting Pirates can catch a train. Right fielder Johnny Barrett steals four bags, while shortstop Frankie Zak pilfers two.
- August 2 – A four-hour U.S. Army court martial proceeding at Fort Hood, Texas, acquits second lieutenant Jack R. Robinson, a former multi-sport athlete at UCLA and member of the 761st Tank Battalion, a mostly Black unit, of two charges stemming from his refusal to move to the back of a legally desegregated military bus on July 6.
- August 10 – Red Barrett of the Boston Braves shuts out the Cincinnati Reds, 2–0, at Crosley Field and throws just 58 pitches – a record for fewest pitches in a nine-inning game; the game lasts 75 minutes. Barrett gives up only two hits. He does not strike out or walk any batters, and throws an average of only two pitches per batter. There are 14 putouts at first base, five by the rest of the infield (including Barrett), six by the outfield, and two by the catcher (on foul pop ups). In 1944, 96 of the Reds' games are completed in under two hours.
- August 22 – In the seventh inning of today's contest at Griffith Stadium, the St. Louis Browns' Nels Potter, making his fourth start since returning from his suspension for throwing a spitball, collides—perhaps deliberately—with baserunner George Case of the Washington Senators while chasing Case's foul bunt along the first-base line. Case comes up swinging and a melee ensues; Potter, Case and Washington's Ed Butka (who comes off the Senators' bench to join the brawl) are ejected. Potter ends up on the losing end of the 3–0 final. The defeat drops his record to 12–6 (3.13), but in his next eight starts, he'll go 7–1 (2.08) with seven complete games and two shutouts as a key figure in the Browns' pennant drive.

=== September ===
- September 2:
  - The Detroit Tigers (69–58) defeat the first-place St. Louis Browns, 6–3, to take their third straight decision in a crucial, four-game series at Sportsman's Park, and shave the 71–58 Browns' American League lead to one game. The New York Yankees (70–59) are also a game back and the Boston Red Sox (70–60) are 1½ out. The Browns' AL lead had been as high as 6½ games in early August, but the next four weeks will see a topsy-turvy AL race between St. Louis, Detroit and New York.
  - At Ebbets Field, Dixie Walker of the Brooklyn Dodgers hits for the cycle in Brooklyn's 8–4 win over the New York Giants. "The People's 'Cherce'" puts up the National League's only "cycle" of 1944.
- September 3 – Bobby Doerr, the Boston Red Sox' four-time All-Star second baseman, goes one for four off Jesse Flores of the Philadelphia Athletics in today's 5–1 defeat at Fenway Park. Doerr, 26, then joins the U.S. Army, cutting short his season after 125 games played. Despite missing his team's final 23 contests, he finishes first in slugging percentage in the American League at .528. Doerr will be inducted into the Hall of Fame in 1986. The loss of Doerr and ace pitcher Tex Hughson to military service causes the Bosox to drop 16 of their final 22 games.
- September 21 – The St. Louis Cardinals clinch their third straight National League pennant, sweeping a doubleheader from the Boston Braves on the road in Boston. They lead the second-place Pittsburgh Pirates, who sweep the Brooklyn Dodgers today, by 13 full games. The Redbirds will finish 1944 with 105 regular-season victories, capping a dominant three-year stretch in which they average 105.3 victories a season.
- September 24:
  - The Homestead Grays defeat the Birmingham Black Barons, 4–2, to win the fifth and deciding game of the 1944 Negro World Series at Griffith Stadium. Roy Welmaker wins his second game of the 1944 classic. The Grays win their second straight championship, both of them against the Black Barons.
  - The last-place Philadelphia Phillies give the NL champion Cardinals a battle before succumbing twice to the Redbirds in a Shibe Park doubleheader. In Game 1, the Phillies' Ken Raffensberger and Cards' Mort Cooper duel for 16 innings before St. Louis emerges with a 4–3 victory on a Whitey Kurowski homer; Cooper allows 19 hits but holds the Phils to only three runs. In Game 2, the Cardinals' Ted Wilks and Phillies' Charley Schanz each go eight scoreless innings; then an unearned run in the top of the ninth seals a 1–0 triumph for the World Series-bound Cardinals. The win gives Wilks a brilliant 17–3 record—a winning percentage of .850—in his rookie season.
- September 27 – The St. Louis Browns fall out of first place in the American League, losing 4–1 to the Boston Red Sox at home while the Detroit Tigers shut out the Philadelphia Athletics, 4–0. The Tigers now lead St. Louis by one game; each team has four to play.
- September 29 – Nels Potter throws a two-hit shutout for his 19th win and his Browns make a first-inning run stand up, enabling St. Louis to sweep a doubleheader against the visiting New York Yankees, 4–1 and 1–0, and move into a first-place tie with Detroit, which splits its twin bill against the Senators in Washington. The Tigers' Dizzy Trout (27–13) fails in his attempt to win his 28th game of 1944 in the nightcap.
- September 30 – Future Hall-of-Fame southpaw Hal Newhouser captures his 29th game, defeating Washington, 7–3, and keeping his Tigers in a flat-footed tie with the Browns, who defeat the Yankees behind Denny Galehouse.

=== October ===
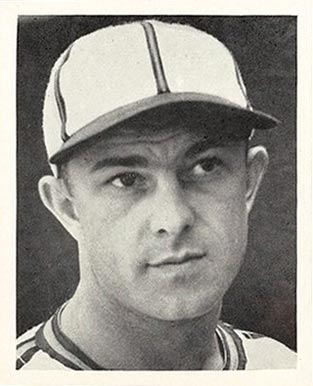
Chet Laabs

- October 1:
  - Before a sell-out crowd of 35,518 at Sportsman's Park, one of the unlikeliest heroes in baseball annals—Sig Jakucki, a belligerent, 35-year-old right-hander whose battles with alcoholism have derailed his career—allows the New York Yankees only a single earned run and pitches his St. Louis Browns to what will be the only American League pennant in their history; the final score is St. Louis 5, New York 2. The Browns are paced at the plate by Chet Laabs (two homers, four runs batted in) and Vern Stephens (a solo blast). At 89–65, they finish one game in front of the Detroit Tigers (88–66), who drop a 4–1 decision to Washington knuckle-baller Dutch Leonard.
    - The upcoming World Series will be the Browns' only Fall Classic appearance before they relocate to Baltimore ten years later. Matching the landlord Browns against their Sportsman's Park tenants, the 105–game-winning St. Louis Cardinals, the 1944 Fall Classic marks only the third time in World Series history in which both teams share the same home field (the others occurred in 1921 and 1922 at the Polo Grounds). The match-up will be nicknamed the "Streetcar Series" and the "St. Louis Showdown".
  - On the closing day of the National League's regular season, iron-man catcher Ray Mueller starts the Cincinnati Reds' 155th game (out of 155) of 1944. Mueller, 32, catches only four innings today before he's relieved by Joe Just—but he's been behind the plate for 140 complete games and 1,355 of a possible 1,398 innings played on defense by the Reds. Mueller will spend 1945 in military service, but when he returns to baseball in 1946, he'll continue his games-started streak through April 21, and his consecutive-games-played skein through May 5.
- October 9 – In Game 6 of the World Series, the "St. Louis Showdown" concludes when the Cardinals defeat the Browns, 3–1, to win their fifth World Series since 1926, four games to two. The Browns had led the Fall Classic, two games to one, on October 6, but are held to only two total runs over Games 4–6 by Cardinal hurlers Harry Brecheen, Mort Cooper, Max Lanier and Ted Wilks.
- October 31 – The Sporting News names former 30-game-winner (and future Hall of Famer) Dizzy Dean the majors' "#1 baseball play-by-play announcer" for 1944. Dean, whose sprinkling of non-grammatical country slang into his broadcasts has sometimes drawn criticism, is the lead announcer for St. Louis' two big-league teams—the World Series champion Cardinals and the AL-champion Browns.

=== November ===
- November 1 – A three-person group headlined by club president/general manager Branch Rickey acquires one-quarter ownership in the Dodgers from the Brooklyn Trust Company for an estimated $250,000. The stock, formerly held by the late Edward J. McKeever, has been managed by the bank on behalf of the McKeever estate. Other members of the ownership group are insurance executive Andrew L. Schmitz and the Dodgers' general counsel, Walter O'Malley. Brooklyn Trust still oversees 50% of the team's stock on behalf of the Charles Ebbets estate. Edward McKeever and Ebbets died within 11 days of each other in April 1925.
- November 25 – Hospitalized with respiratory woes since October 2, Kenesaw Mountain Landis, the first Commissioner of Baseball, dies at 78 in Chicago, eight days after being re-elected to a new, seven-year term as "baseball's czar." (See Deaths entry for this date below.) Autocratic, all-powerful, and feared by most owners and players, Landis has been Commissioner since January 12, 1921. He will be immediately elected to the Hall of Fame after a special ballot on December 10, 1944.
- November 28:
  - Detroit Tigers pitcher Hal Newhouser, who posted a 29–9 record with 187 strikeouts and a 2.22 ERA, is named the American League's Most Valuable Player, gathering four more votes than pitching teammate Dizzy Trout (27–14, 144, 2.12).
  - Second lieutenant Jackie Robinson receives an honorable discharge from the U.S. Army. After writing to the owners of the Kansas City Monarchs of the Negro American League, the former UCLA star athlete, a letterman in baseball (as well as basketball, football and track and field), is invited to their 1945 spring training camp.

=== December ===
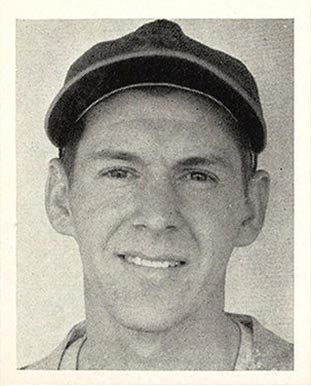
Marty Marion

- December 2 – Japan, where baseball has been banned as an undesirable enemy influence, mourns the death of Eiji Sawamura. The Japanese pitcher, who is killed in action in the Pacific, became a national hero by striking out Babe Ruth in an exhibition game.
- December 9 – The New York Yankees obtain 19-year-old right-hander Cuddles Marshall from the Seattle Rainiers of the Pacific Coast League for pitchers Johnny Babich and Dick Hearn.
- December 12:
  - At their annual winter meetings, MLB magnates decide that the position of Commissioner of Baseball—vacant since the November 25 death of Kenesaw Mountain Landis—will temporarily be filled by a three-man Advisory Council consisting of league presidents Ford Frick and Will Harridge and Landis's chief aide, Leslie O'Connor, a Chicago attorney. Authority will return to a single Commissioner when Landis's successor is selected and takes office.
  - Detroit Tigers manager Steve O'Neill acquires his son-in-law, shortstop Skeeter Webb, from the Chicago White Sox for third baseman Joe Orengo.
- December 21 – Marty Marion, the slick-fielding, 27-year-old shortstop of the world-champion St. Louis Cardinals, edges Chicago Cubs slugger Bill Nicholson by a single point (190 to 189) to win the 1944 NL Most Valuable Player Award. In the close election, Marion receives seven of 24 first place votes and Nicholson four, followed by Dixie Walker, Stan Musial and Bucky Walters (three), Ray Mueller (two), and Walker Cooper and Babe Dahlgren (one each).
- December 22 – Connie Mack, speaking in Los Angeles on his 82nd birthday, predicts a new era of prosperity for baseball when World War II ends, but warns his audience: "I don't believe that the major leagues will ever stretch to the Pacific Coast." He opposes expansion, and notes that "the Pacific Coast League is doing well in its present structure"—as a top-level minor league.
- December 28 – Buddy Lewis, the Washington Senators' pre-war All-Star third baseman, wins the Distinguished Flying Cross for flying 392 combat missions as a transport pilot over the China Burma India Theater. Lewis interrupted his baseball career after the 1941 season to serve in the United States Army Air Force. He won't return to the Senators until July 27, 1945.

== Births ==
=== January ===
- January 3 – Dick Colpaert
- January 4:
  - Tito Fuentes
  - Charlie Manuel
- January 5:
  - Tom Kelley
  - Charlie Vinson
- January 7 – Dick Calmus
- January 9 – Dick Thoenen
- January 10 – Chuck Dobson
- January 11:
  - Frank Baker
  - Jim McAndrew
- January 13 – Larry Jaster
- January 16 – Gene Stone
- January 17 – Denny Doyle
- January 18 – Carl Morton
- January 19 – Chet Trail
- January 20 – Carl Taylor
- January 23 – Paul Ratliff
- January 25 – Gary Holman

=== February ===
- February 1:
  - Paul Blair
  - Hal King
- February 3:
  - Wayne Comer
  - Celerino Sánchez
- February 9:
  - Jim Campanis
  - Randy Schwartz
- February 11 – Ollie Brown
- February 13 – Sal Bando
- February 16 – Glenn Vaughan
- February 17 – Dick Bosman
- February 18 – Syd O'Brien
- February 19 – Chris Zachary
- February 21 – Tokuji Nagaike
- February 23 – Don Shaw
- February 25 – Stump Merrill
- February 26 – Don Secrist
- February 29 – Steve Mingori

=== March ===
- March 1:
  - Vern Fuller
  - Ron Klimkowski
- March 9 – Ed Acosta
- March 10:
  - John Briggs
  - Joe Campbell
- March 12 – Joe Moock
- March 14 – John Miller
- March 15:
  - Wayne Granger
  - Dave Watkins
- March 16 – Rick Renick
- March 17 – Cito Gaston
- March 20:
  - Steve Blateric
  - Bob Taylor
- March 21 – Manny Sanguillén
- March 22 – Matt Galante
- March 23 – George Scott
- March 25 – Jim Britton
- March 29 – Denny McLain

=== April ===
- April 1 – Rusty Staub
- April 3 – Gomer Hodge
- April 7 – Bill Stoneman
- April 9 – Joe Brinkman
- April 12 – Terry Harmon
- April 14 – Frank Bertaina
- April 16 – Bob Montgomery
- April 24 – Bill Singer
- April 25:
  - Drew Baur
  - Joe Hague
  - Ken Tatum
- April 26 – Leon McFadden

=== May ===
- May 6 – Masanori Murakami
- May 7 – Billy Murphy
- May 14 – Jim Driscoll
- May 19 – Stan Swanson
- May 22:
  - Frank Coggins
  - Bob Schaefer
- May 27 – Jim Holt

=== June ===
- June 6 – Bud Harrelson
- June 7:
  - Roger Nelson
  - Frank Reberger
- June 8 – Mark Belanger
- June 20 – Dave Nelson
- June 28 – Hal Breeden
- June 30 – Ron Swoboda

=== July ===
- July 4 – Fred Rico
- July 9:
  - Hal Haydel
  - Sonny Jackson
- July 12 – Tom Tischinski
- July 13 – Buzz Stephen
- July 14 – Billy McCool
- July 18 – Rudy May
- July 22 – Sparky Lyle
- July 25:
  - Buddy Bradford
  - Fred Scherman
- July 30:
  - Pat Kelly
  - Doug Rader
- July 31 – Frank Brosseau

=== August ===
- August 2 – Chris Coletta
- August 4 – Rich Nye
- August 15:
  - Mike Compton
  - John Matias
- August 18 – Mike Ferraro
- August 20 – Graig Nettles
- August 25 – Dick Smith
- August 27 – Johnny Hairston
- August 30 – Tug McGraw

=== September ===
- September 7 – Barry Lersch
- September 10 – Jim Hibbs
- September 11:
  - John McSherry
  - Dave Roberts
- September 16 – Chuck Brinkman
- September 19 – Russ Nagelson
- September 20 – Ed Phillips
- September 22 – Jim Fairey
- September 23 – Oscar Zamora
- September 27:
  - Gene Rounsaville
  - Gary Sutherland

=== October ===
- October 4 – Tony La Russa
- October 8 – Ed Kirkpatrick
- October 9 – Freddie Patek
- October 11 – Mike Fiore
- October 14 – Rich Robertson
- October 15 – Dick Such
- October 23 – Jim Rittwage
- October 24 – Johnny Jeter
- October 25 – Skip Guinn
- October 29:
  - Jim Bibby
  - Gary Neibauer

=== November ===
- November 7 – Joe Niekro
- November 8 – Ed Kranepool
- November 9 – Al Severinsen
- November 17 – Tom Seaver
- November 27 – Ron Tompkins

=== December ===
- December 1 – Jim Ray
- December 4 – Lee Bales
- December 6 – Tony Horton
- December 9 – Del Unser
- December 10 – Steve Renko
- December 15:
  - Stan Bahnsen
  - Jim Leyland
- December 18 – Steve Hovley
- December 19 – Rob Gardner
- December 20 – Don Mason
- December 22 – Steve Carlton
- December 23:
  - Ray Lamb
  - Vic LaRose
- December 30:
  - José Morales
  - Bob Schroder

== Deaths ==
=== January ===
- January 7 – George Mullin, 63, pitcher who won 228 games, 209 of them for the Detroit Tigers, for whom he pitched from 1902 until May 1913; threw a no-hitter on July 4, 1912 against the St. Louis Browns; posted five 20-win seasons, including a 29–8 mark in 1909; went 3–3 (2.02) in seven World Series games (1907, 1908, 1909).
- January 8 – Harry Daubert, 51, pinch-hitter for the 1915 Pittsburgh Pirates.
- January 10 – Ted Trent, 40, pitcher and four-time All-Star who pitched in the Negro National League, Eastern Colored League and Negro American League between 1927 and 1939; in 1928, his brilliant 19–3 (2.36) season led the St. Louis Stars to the NNL pennant.
- January 13 – Kid Elberfeld, 68, shortstop for six clubs in 11 seasons between 1898 and 1914, who also managed the New York Highlanders of the American League from June 25, 1908 through season's end.
- January 30 – Ed Clough, 37, outfielder and pitcher who played from 1924 through 1926 with the St. Louis Cardinals.

=== February ===
- February 4 – Dixie Davis, 53, pitcher who played for the Cincinnati Reds, Chicago White Sox, Philadelphia Phillies and St. Louis Browns during ten seasons spanning 1910–1926.
- February 9 – John Wesley Johnson Jr., 28, outfielder who played 11 games for the 1943 Cleveland Buckeyes of the Negro American League.
- February 13 – Darltie Cooper, 41, pitcher, outfielder and first baseman who played in the Eastern Colored League, Negro National League, and other Black baseball organizations between 1923 and 1940; led 1929 ECL in games won (16), earned run average (2.51) and complete games; brother of Anthony Cooper.
- February 18 – Hub Pernoll, 55, pitcher for the Detroit Tigers in the 1910 and 1912 seasons.
- February 20 – Harry Wilhelm, 69, pitcher for the 1899 Louisville Colonels.
- February 21 – Jack Enzenroth, 58, catcher who played from 1914 to 1915 with the St. Louis Browns and the Kansas City Packers.
- February 22 – David D. Thomas, 43, second baseman who appeared in the Negro National League and Negro Southern League between 1922 and 1932.
- February 23 – Al Bauer, 84, pitcher who played with the Columbus Buckeyes in 1884 and for the St. Louis Maroons in 1886.
- February 25 – Bill Knowlton, 45, pitcher who played for the Philadelphia Athletics during the 1920 season.

=== March ===
- March 5 – Charles Wesley, 47, outfielder/second baseman who played and managed in the Negro National League during the 1920s, chiefly with the Birmingham Black Barons and Memphis Red Sox.
- March 10 – Dan Howley, 58, player, coach and manager who caught in 1913 for the Philadelphia Phillies; later coached for the Detroit Tigers in 1919 and 1921–1922, then managed the St. Louis Browns from 1927 to 1929 and the Cincinnati Reds from 1930 to 1932.
- March 11 – Bill Duzen, 74, pitcher who played in 1890 for the Buffalo Bisons of the Players' League.
- March 17 – Rube Kroh, 57, pitcher who played for the Boston Americans, Chicago Cubs and Boston Braves during six seasons spanning 1906–1912, being also credited as the player who got the ball into the hands of Johnny Evers in the famous Merkle's Boner game.
- March 18 – Frank Motz, 74, first baseman who played with the Philadelphia Phillies in 1890 and the Cincinnati Reds from 1893 to 1894.
- March 19:
  - Joe Dunn, 59, catcher for the Brooklyn Superbas during the 1908 and 1909 baseball seasons, who later became a distinguished manager in the minor leagues, winning championship titles in 1919, 1920 and 1930.
  - John Kelly, 65, ot. Louis Cardinals in the 1907 season.
- March 22 – Claude Hendrix, 54, pitcher who played from 1911 through 1920 for the Pittsburgh Pirates, Chicago Chi-Feds, Chicago Whales and Chicago Cubs.
- March 24 – Bob Glenalvin, 77, second baseman for the Chicago Colts of the National League in 1890 and 1893.
- March 26 – Neil Stynes, 75, catcher who played in two games for the 1890 Cleveland Infants of the short-lived Players' League.

=== April ===
- April 2 – Bob Brush, 69, backup catcher who played for the 1907 Boston Doves of the National League.
- April 11 – Jack Dunleavy, 64, outfielder and pitcher who played from 1903 through 1905 for the St. Louis Cardinals.
- April 16 – Pop Foster, 66, outfielder who spent 18 years in baseball, four of them in the Major Leagues with the New York Giants, Washington Senators and Chicago White Sox from 1898 to 1901.
- April 19 – O'Neal Pullen, 51, catcher for the Baltimore Black Sox of the Eastern Colored League in 1924.
- April 20 – Elmer Gedeon, 27, outfielder for the 1939 Washington Senators, whose name is linked forever to that of Harry O'Neill as the only two major leaguers that were killed during World War II.
- April 25 – Tony Mullane, 85, first pitcher to throw left-handed and right-handed in a same game, who won 284 games a posted 3.05 ERA in 13 seasons, including five 30-win seasons and the first no-hitter in American Association history in 1882, while leading the league in shutouts twice and strikeouts once, and compiling 264 complete with the Cincinnati Reds, which remains a club record.

=== May ===
- May 2 – Art Thomason, 55, backup outfielder for the 1910 Cleveland Naps.
- May 9 – Snake Deal, 65, first baseman who played with the Cincinnati Reds in 1906.
- May 12 – John Pappalau, 69, pitcher for the Cleveland Spiders in 1897.
- May 14 – Billy Hart, 77, pitcher who played for the 1890 St. Louis Browns of the American Association.
- May 18:
  - Bob Clark, 46, pitcher who played from 1920 to 1921 for the Cleveland Indians.
  - Tim Shinnick, 76, second baseman who played from 1890 to 1891 for the Louisville Colonels of the American Association.
- May 31 – John McKelvey, 96, outfielder who played in 1875 for the New Haven Elm Citys of the National Association of Professional Base Ball Players.

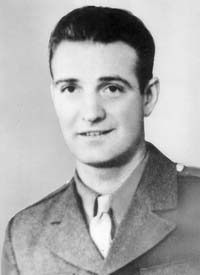
John Joseph Pinder Jr.

=== June ===
- June 5 – Phil Knell, 79, pitcher for the Cleveland Spiders, Columbus Solons, Louisville Colonels, Philadelphia Athletics, Pittsburgh Alleghenys/Pirates and Washington Senators in a span of six years from 1888 to 1995, who had two 20-win seasons, and led three different leagues for the most hitters hit by pitches from 1890 to 1892.
- June 6 – John Joseph Pinder Jr., 32, Technician Fifth Grade, 16th Infantry Regiment, 1st Infantry Division, U.S. Army, a pre-war minor-league pitcher killed in action on D-Day during the Normandy landings; though twice wounded, he refused medical attention in order to bring critical communications equipment ashore for the Allied forces; posthumously awarded the Medal of Honor on January 4, 1945.
- June 8 – Henry Williams, 51, catcher in the Negro leagues whose career extended from 1923 to 1937, chiefly with the St. Louis Stars; member of 1928 and 1930 Negro National League champions.
- June 21 – Harry Swacina, 62, first baseman who played for the Pittsburgh Pirates and Baltimore Terrapins in parts of four seasons from 1907 to 1915.
- June 28 – Dan Stearns, 82, first baseman for six teams in seven seasons spanning 1880–1889, who is better known as the man that produced the final out in Tony Mullane's no-hitter in 1882, he first no-no in American Association history.

=== July ===
- July 3:
  - Pete McBride, 68, pitcher for the 1898 Cleveland Spiders and the 1899 St. Louis Perfectos of the National League.
  - Charlie Reynolds, 79, catcher who played for the Kansas City Cowboys and the Brooklyn Bridegrooms of the American Association in 1889.
- July 5 – Claude Rothgeb, 64, right fielder for the 1904 Washington Senators of the American League; distinguished football coach at Colorado College and Rice University, and baseball coach at Texas A&M.
- July 10 – Tom Walker, 62, pitcher who played with the Philadelphia Athletics in 1902 and Cincinnati Reds from 1904 to 1905.
- July 16:
  - Hal Irelan, 53, second baseman for the Philadelphia Phillies in 1914.
  - Porter Moss, 34, pitcher in Black baseball, principally for the Memphis Red Sox of the Negro American League, from 1932 until his death; fatally shot after he tried to quell a disturbance in the "Jim Crow car" during a passenger train ride.
- July 17 – Roy S. Williams, 36, pitcher who appeared for the Memphis Red Sox, Baltimore Black Sox, Brooklyn Eagles and Homestead Grays of the Negro leagues between 1930 and 1935.
- July 19 – Clarence Lindsay, 46, shortstop/third baseman who played almost exclusively in the Eastern Colored League between 1923 and 1928; briefly managed New York Elite Giants in 1926.
- July 20 – Rap Dixon, 41, All-Star outfielder who played for eight clubs, including the Harrisburg Giants and Baltimore Black Sox, and in five different Negro leagues from 1922 through 1937; a power hitter who could also hit for average, and one of the fastest players and best defensive outfielders in Negro league history.
- July 22 – Irv Waldron, 68, catcher who played for the Milwaukee Brewers and Washington Senators of the American League in 1901.

=== August ===
- August 2 – Arthur Hauger, 50, fourth outfielder for the 1912 Cleveland Naps, who also spent more than 30 years in baseball as a player, coach and manager in the minor leagues.
- August 4 – Camp Skinner, 47, backup outfielder who played in 1922 for the first-place New York Yankees and the next year played for the last-place Boston Red Sox.
- August 16 – Tom Sullivan, 37, catcher who played briefly with the Cincinnati Reds in 1925.
- August 21:
  - Bob Gilks, 80, infielder/outfielder and pitcher for the Cleveland Blues/Spiders and Baltimore Orioles in five seasons from 1887 to 1893; hit .239 in 339 games, and posted a 9–9 pitching record with a 3.98 ERA, while leading the American Association in saves in 1888.
  - Lew Post, 69, outfielder for the 1902 Detroit Tigers.
- August 29 – Willie McGill, 70, left-handed pitcher who made his debut in the Players' League in 1890 at age 16; the following year, won 21 games in the last season of the American Association; spent the rest of his career in the National League primarily during a lively ball era, ending with a win–loss record of 72–74 for six teams, before retiring at age 22 in 1896.
- August 30 – Bill Duggleby, 70, pitcher for three clubs during eight seasons from 1898 to 1907, who had a 20-win season and posted a career record of 93–102 with a 3.18 ERA, including 159 complete games, in 241 pitching appearances.

=== September ===
- September 4 – Jack Gleason, 90, third baseman for five teams in a span of six seasons from 1877 to 1886, and a member of the 1884 Union Association-champion St. Louis Maroons.
- September 9:
  - Frank Shugart, 77, shortstop for six teams in eight seasons spanning 1890–1901; blacklisted from the American League after the 1901 season for punching an umpire in the face, he finished his career in independent and minor league baseball.
  - Orlin Collier, 37, pitcher for the Detroit Tigers in 1931.
- September 16 – Farmer Steelman, 69, catcher who played from 1899 through 1902 for the Louisville Colonels, Brooklyn Superbas and Philadelphia Athletics.

=== October ===
- October 2 – Dick Robertson, 53, pitcher who played for the Cincinnati Reds, Brooklyn Robins and Washington Senators in parts of three seasons between 1913 and 1919.
- October 9 – Joe DeBerry, 47, right-hander who hurled for the St. Louis Browns of the American League in 1920 and 1921.
- October 10 – Louis Leroy, 65, pitcher for the New York Highlanders in 1905–1906 and Boston Red Sox in 1910.
- October 14 – Topsy Hartsel, 70, outfielder for four teams in 14 seasons, who led the American League in stolen bases and runs scored in 1902; during his ten years with the Philadelphia Athletics (1902–1911), his teams won AL pennants in 1902 and 1905, and the World Series in 1910 and 1911.
- October 17 – Jack Powell, 70, pitcher who won 245 career games, primarily for the NL's St. Louis Cardinals (1899–1901) and the AL's St. Louis Browns (1902–1903, 1905–1912).
- October 22 – Jim Brown, 47, fourth outfielder who played for the 1915 St. Louis Cardinals and 1916 Philadelphia Athletics.
- October 24 – Pinky Swander, 64, right fielder who played from 1903 to 1904 for the St. Louis Browns.
- October 29 – Scott Hardesty, 74, shortstop for the 1899 New York Giants.

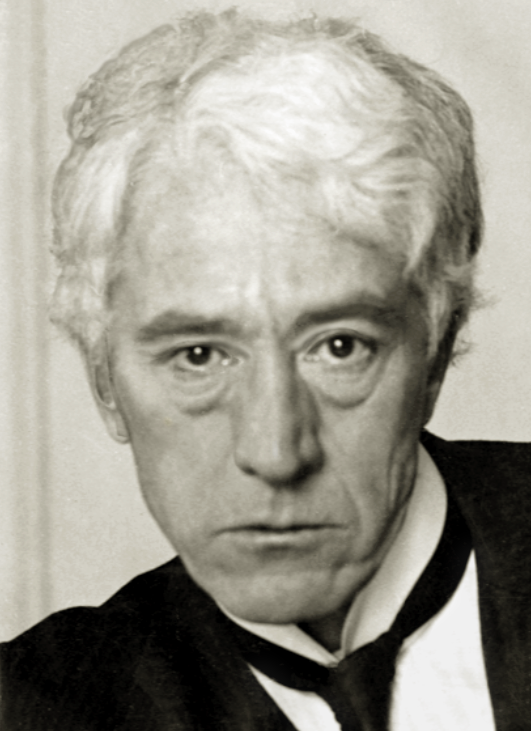
Kenesaw Mountain Landis

=== November ===
- November 2:
  - Ed Brandt, 39, pitcher who played from 1928 through 1938 for the Boston Braves, Brooklyn Dodgers and Pittsburgh Pirates.
  - Bert Conn, 65, pitcher and second baseman for the 1898 and 1900 Philadelphia Phillies.
- November 3 – Wabishaw "Doc" Wiley, 57, Howard University-trained dentist and a catcher, first baseman and outfielder in Black baseball between 1909 and 1923; played for the New York Lincoln Giants of the Eastern Colored League in his final season.
- November 19 – Frank Brill, 80, pitcher and outfielder for the 1884 Detroit Wolverines of the National League.
- November 25 – Kenesaw Mountain Landis, 78, commissioner of baseball since that office's creation in 1920, who established the position's authority; oversaw the cleanup of corruption in wake of the Black Sox scandal, banishing eight players for life for their involvement in throwing the 1919 World Series; previously, a federal judge who presided over the 1914 Federal League lawsuit against the major leagues for antitrust violations; strong advocate of the independence of minor league baseball; upheld the "gentleman's agreement" that racially segregated the playing ranks of "Organized Baseball" during his term.
- November 28 – Elmer Miller, 54, outfielder who played for the St. Louis Cardinals, New York Yankees and Boston Red Sox in part of nine seasons between 1912 and 1922.

=== December ===
- December 2 – Eiji Sawamura, 27, Hall of Fame Japanese pitcher who played for the Tokyo Kyojin.
- December 4 – Roger Bresnahan, 65, Hall of Fame catcher and leadoff hitter who starred for the New York Giants from 1902 to 1908, known as the first major leaguer to wear shin guards, while remaining the only catcher to steal over 200 bases in a Major League career.
- December 9 – Swat McCabe, 63, shortstop who played from 1909 to 1910 for the Cincinnati Reds.
- December 12 – Ed Pinnance, 65, Canadian pitcher who played with the Philadelphia Athletics in its 1903 season.
- December 13:
  - Lloyd Christenbury, 51, infield/outfield utility who played four seasons with the Boston Braves from 1919 to 1922.
  - Welcome Gaston, 69, pitcher who played for the Brooklyn's Bridegrooms and Superbas clubs in parts of the 1898 and 1899 seasons.
- December 14 – Jouett Meekin, 77, who was reportedly as one of the three hardest-throwing pitchers of the 1890s, along with Cy Young and Amos Rusie, while playing from 1891 to 1900 with five different National League teams, most prominently for the New York Giants from 1894 to 1899, winning 33 games for the team in 1894 en route to a postseason championship.
- December 15 – Jim Chatterton, 80, infield/outfield utility and pitcher who played for the Kansas City Cowboys of the Union Association in 1884.
- December 20 – Elmer Zacher, 64, outfielder who played for the New York Giants and St. Louis Cardinals during the 1910 season.
- December 28 – Bill Bowman, 77, backup catcher for the Chicago Colts in 1891.
- December 31 – Bill Chappelle, 63, pitcher who played for the Boston Doves, Cincinnati Reds and Brooklyn Tip-Tops in a span of three seasons from 1908 to 1914.
