= Ray Mueller =

American baseball player (1912–1994)

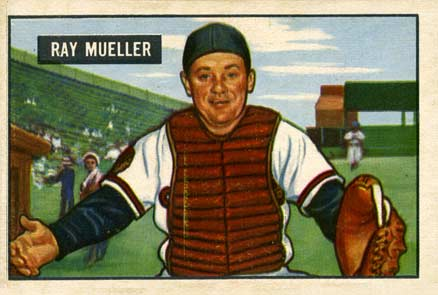
- Catcher
- Born: March 8, 1912; Pittsburg, Kansas, U.S.
- Died: June 29, 1994 (aged 82); Lower Paxton Township, Pennsylvania, U.S.
- Batted: Right Threw: Right

MLB debut
- May 11, 1935, for the Boston Braves / Bees

Last MLB appearance
- September 9, 1951, for the Boston Braves

MLB statistics
- Batting average: .252
- Home runs: 56
- Runs batted in: 373
- Stats at Baseball Reference

Teams
- Boston Braves / Bees (1935–1938); Pittsburgh Pirates (1939–1940); Cincinnati Reds (1943–1944, 1946–1949); New York Giants (1949–1950); Pittsburgh Pirates (1950); Boston Braves (1951)

Career highlights and awards
- All-Star (1944)

Ray Coleman Mueller (March 8, 1912 – June 29, 1994) was an American professional baseball player. He played as a catcher in Major League Baseball from 1935 to 1944 and 1946 to 1951. Nicknamed "Iron Man", Mueller was the starting catcher in every game the Cincinnati Reds played — 155 — during the wartime 1944 season. Mueller caught a National League-record 233 consecutive games in 1943–1944 and 1946.

== Baseball career ==
The native of Pittsburg, Kansas, was a first cousin of MLB infielder Don Gutteridge. He threw and batted right-handed, stood 5 feet 9 inches (1.75 m) tall and weighed 175 pounds (79 kg). During a 14-year Major League career, Mueller played for the Cincinnati Reds, Boston Braves, Pittsburgh Pirates and New York Giants. After his playing career, Mueller managed in minor league baseball and coached in the Majors for the Giants (1956), Chicago Cubs (1957) and Cleveland Indians (1966).

But he became best known as the everyday catcher of the 1944 Reds. In 1943, Mueller had warmed up for his iron-man role by catching in 141 games for Cincinnati, including every game from July 31 through the end of the campaign. Then, in 1944, he started and caught in every Red game — 155, including an official contest that was ruled a tie. While he did not catch every inning for the 1944 Reds (backups Len Rice, Joe Just and Johnny Riddle handled 17 total chances in a total of 43 innings caught), Mueller caught 140 complete games and 1,329 2/3 innings; he handled 545 chances, threw out 39 percent of would-be base-stealers, and batted a career-high .286 with ten home runs and 73 runs batted in. He was named to the National League All-Star team and caught Clyde Shoun's no-hitter against Boston on May 15, 1944.

The following season, 1945, Mueller was called to military service by the United States Army — putting his consecutive game streak on hold until 1946. He would extend it to 233 games through May 6, 1946, before finally taking a game off. The 1943, 1944 and 1946 seasons would be the only years in which Mueller would appear in more than 100 games.

On June 13, 1949, he was traded to the New York Giants for catcher Walker Cooper.

== Career statistics ==
In a fourteen-year career, Mueller played in 985 games, accumulating 733 hits in 2,911 at bats for a .252 career batting average along with 56 home runs, 373 runs batted in and a .314 on-base percentage. He ended his career with a .988 fielding percentage which was 8 points higher than the league average during his playing career. He led National League catchers three times in assists, twice each in baserunners caught stealing and once in fielding percentage and putouts. Mueller's 51.91% career caught stealing percentage ranks seventh all-time among major league catchers.

He is interred at the Harrisburg Cemetery in Harrisburg, Pennsylvania.
