= Mike Kosman =

American baseball player (1917–2002)

- Second baseman
- Born: November 26, 1917; Hamtramck, Michigan, U.S.
- Died: December 10, 2002 (aged 85); Lafayette, Indiana, U.S.
- Batted: Right Threw: Right

MLB debut
- April 20, 1944, for the Cincinnati Reds

Last MLB appearance
- April 20, 1944, for the Cincinnati Reds

MLB statistics
- Batting average: .000
- Home runs: 0
- Runs batted in: 0
- Stats at Baseball Reference

Teams
- Cincinnati Reds (1944)

Michael Thomas Kosman (November 26, 1917 – December 10, 2002) was an American Major League Baseball player. Kosman played in one game in the 1944 season with the Cincinnati Reds. He had no at-bats in the game.

Kosman was born in Hamtramck, Michigan and died in Lafayette, Indiana.
