= Roy Johnson (pitcher) =

American baseball player and coach

- Johnson in 1939
- Pitcher
- Born: October 1, 1895; Madill, Oklahoma, U.S.
- Died: January 10, 1986 (aged 90); Scottsdale, Arizona, U.S.
- Batted: Right Threw: Right

MLB debut
- August 7, 1918, for the Philadelphia Athletics

Last MLB appearance
- September 2, 1918, for the Philadelphia Athletics

MLB statistics
- Win–loss record: 1–5
- Earned run average: 3.42
- Strikeouts: 12
- Stats at Baseball Reference

Teams
- As player: Philadelphia Athletics (1918); As manager: Chicago Cubs (1944) (one game); As coach: Chicago Cubs (1935–1939; 1944–1953)

Roy Johnson (October 1, 1895 – January 10, 1986) was an American right-handed pitcher and longtime coach in Major League Baseball. He also was the interim manager of the Chicago Cubs for one game in 1944. He was nicknamed "Hardrock" as a minor league manager because his teams played in a tough, uncompromising way.

== Early life and career ==
Johnson was born in Madill, Oklahoma. He entered pro baseball in 1915, and, in his only big league season, the war-shortened 1918 campaign, he compiled a 1–5 win–loss mark (.167) and a 3.42 earned run average in ten games and 50 innings pitched for the Philadelphia Athletics. He returned to the minor leagues as a pitcher thereafter, and became a manager with Bisbee of the Class D Arizona–Texas League in 1929.

In 1935, Johnson was promoted to a coaching position with the Cubs by manager Charlie Grimm. He was associated with the Cubs for the remainder of his career as a coach (1935–39; 1944–53), minor league pilot, and scout. The Cubs won three National League pennants (1935, 1938 and 1945) during Johnson's 15 total years as a coach.

On May 3, 1944, with the Cubs having lost nine of their first ten National League games, he served as interim manager for one game, between Jimmie Wilson and Grimm's second term; Chicago lost to the Cincinnati Reds, 10–4, their tenth defeat in a row.

Johnson died at age 90 in Scottsdale, Arizona.

== Managerial record ==
Team	Year	Regular season					Postseason			
Team	Year	Games	Won	Lost	Win %	Finish	Won	Lost	Win %	Result
CHC	1944	0	1	0	.000	(interim)				
Total		0	1	0	.000					
