= Hank Miklos =

American baseball player (1910–2000)

- Pitcher
- Born: November 27, 1910; Chicago, Illinois, U.S.
- Died: March 29, 2000 (aged 89); Adrian, Michigan, U.S.
- Batted: Left Threw: Left

MLB debut
- April 23, 1944, for the Chicago Cubs

Last MLB appearance
- May 15, 1944, for the Chicago Cubs

MLB statistics
- Games played: 2
- Earned run average: 7.71
- Strikeouts: 0
- Stats at Baseball Reference

Teams
- Chicago Cubs (1944)

John Joseph "Hank" Miklos (November 27, 1910 – March 29, 2000) was an American pitcher in Major League Baseball (MLB). He played in two Major League games for the Chicago Cubs.

Miklos made his MLB debut on April 23, 1944, in the first game of a double-header against the St. Louis Cardinals at Wrigley Field. Entering the game with the Cubs losing 7–1, he surrendered 4 additional runs over the final 5 innings, en route to the Cubs 11–3 defeat. His final MLB appearance came three weeks later on May 15 when the Cubs hosted the Brooklyn Dodgers as he pitched the final 2 innings, giving up 2 runs, as the Cubs lost 14–3. His MLB totals include a 0–0 win–loss record, 7.71 ERA, 0 strikeouts, and 3 walks.

Prior to his MLB cup of coffee, Miklos played for the Winnipeg Maroons of the Class D Northern League from 1936 to 1939.

Miklos died March 29, 2000, in Adrian, Michigan, aged 89.
