= Bill Ricks =

American baseball player (1919–1987)

- Pitcher
- Born: September 1, 1919; Lexington, North Carolina, U.S.
- Died: July 15, 1987 (aged 67); Brooklyn, New York, U.S.
- Batted: Right Threw: Right

Negro league baseball debut
- 1944, for the Philadelphia Stars

Last appearance
- 1948, for the Philadelphia Stars
- Stats at Baseball Reference

Teams
- Philadelphia Stars (1944–1948)

Career highlights and awards
- Negro National League ERA leader (1948); Negro National League wins leader (1944); Negro National League strikeout leader (1944)

John William "Schoolboy" Ricks (September 1, 1919 – July 15, 1987) was an American professional baseball pitcher in the Negro leagues. He played from 1944 to 1950 with the Philadelphia Stars. He pitched for the Fort Wayne General Electric team in 1949. Ricks was named the MVP of the National Baseball Congress Tournament in 1949 after posting 3 wins and striking out 30 in 26 1/3 innings. He signed with the Winona Chiefs in July 1950. He also played for the Granby Red Sox of the Provincial League in 1951.
