= Pete Elko =

American baseball player (1918–1993)

- Third baseman
- Born: June 17, 1918; Wilkes-Barre, Pennsylvania, U.S.
- Died: September 17, 1993 (aged 75); Wilkes-Barre, Pennsylvania, U.S.
- Batted: Right Threw: Right

MLB debut
- September 17, 1943, for the Chicago Cubs

Last MLB appearance
- October 1, 1944, for the Chicago Cubs

MLB statistics
- Games played: 16
- At bats: 52
- Hits: 9
- Stats at Baseball Reference

Teams
- Chicago Cubs (1943–1944)

Peter "Piccolo Pete" Elko (June 17, 1918 – September 17, 1993) was an American Major League Baseball third baseman who played with the Chicago Cubs in 1943 and 1944.
