= Mack Stewart =

American baseball player (1914–1960)

- Pitcher
- Born: September 23, 1914; Stevenson, Alabama, U.S.
- Died: March 21, 1960 (aged 45); Macon, Georgia, U.S.
- Batted: Right Threw: Right

MLB debut
- July 7, 1944, for the Chicago Cubs

Last MLB appearance
- June 22, 1945, for the Chicago Cubs

MLB statistics
- Win–loss record: 0–1
- Earned run average: 3.76
- Strikeouts: 12
- Stats at Baseball Reference

Teams
- Chicago Cubs (1944–1945)

William Macklin Stewart (September 23, 1914 – March 21, 1960) was an American pitcher in Major League Baseball (MLB) who played during 1944 and 1945 for the Chicago Cubs.

Stewart's only MLB decision came on May 29, 1945, when the Cubs hosted the Brooklyn Dodgers at Wrigley Field. Stewart was the starting pitcher, but allowed 6 runs in only 2 1/3 innings; the Cubs would lose 10–3.
