= Bob Katz (baseball) =

American baseball player (1911–1962)

- Pitcher
- Born: January 30, 1911; Lancaster, Pennsylvania
- Died: December 14, 1962 (aged 51); St. Joseph, Michigan
- Batted: Right Threw: Right

MLB debut
- May 12, 1944, for the Cincinnati Reds

Last MLB appearance
- May 31, 1944, for the Cincinnati Reds

MLB statistics
- Win–loss record: 0–1
- Earned run average: 3.93
- Strikeouts: 4
- Stats at Baseball Reference

Teams
- Cincinnati Reds (1944)

Robert Clyde Katz (January 30, 1911 – December 14, 1962) was a professional baseball pitcher who played for the Cincinnati Reds in 1944.

Bob Katz was born in Lancaster, Pennsylvania, the third son of Charles, a traveling salesman for a paint company, and Mary Katz.

He played his only Major League season during the player-depleted war years, As a 33-year-old in 1944 he pitched in 6 games and 18.1 innings, with a record of 0–1 and an ERA of 3.93. He batted 5 times with no hits. He made his debut on May 22, 1944, pitching one perfect inning in a 5–3 loss to the New York Giants and coaxing outs from Charlie Mead, Hal Luby and Buddy Kerr.

In 1940 he resided in Dayton, Ohio, and played for Louisville of the American Association.

Bob Katz died December 14, 1962, in St. Joseph, Michigan.
