= Max Kase =

American newspaper writer and editor

- Kase in 1952, after receiving Pulitzer Prize
- Born: July 21, 1897; New York City, U.S.
- Died: March 20, 1974 (aged 76); Yonkers, New York, U.S.
- Occupations: Sportswriter, editor
- Years active: 1917–1966
- Employer: New York Journal-American (1938–1966)
- Known for: Pulitzer Prize, 1952
- Predecessor: Wilton S. Farnsworth
- Successor: None (newspaper disbanded)
- Parent(s): Solomon and Fannie Kase

Max Kase (July 21, 1897 – March 20, 1974) was an American newspaper writer and editor. He worked for the Hearst newspapers from 1917 to 1966 and was the sports editor of the New York Journal-American from 1938 to 1966. In 1946, he was one of the driving forces behind the creation of the New York Knicks and the Basketball Association of America, predecessor to the NBA. He won a special Pulitzer Prize in 1952 for his work exposing corruption in men's college basketball, primarily the CCNY Point-Shaving Scandal.

== Childhood ==
Kase was born in July 1897. His German-speaking parents, Solomon and Fannie Kase, emigrated from the Austro-Hungarian Empire to New York in the late 1880s.

At the time of the 1900 United States census, Kase was living on Willett Street on the Lower East Side of Manhattan with his parents and six siblings – Moses (born 1884 in Austria), Annie (born 1889 in New York), Benjamin (born 1891 in New York), Lena (born 1895 in New York), and twins Fannie and Rachel (born 1900 in New York). At that time, Kase's father was working as "cloak operator"—that is, a sewing machine operator working on ladies cloaks.

At the time of the 1910 United States census, Kase was living with his parents and an older sister (Lena) at 334 Georgia Avenue in Brooklyn, New York. At that time, Kase's father was employed as a grocer in a retail store.

By 1918, the family had moved to The Bronx and was living at 1558 Minford Place, near Crotona Park. At the time of the 1920 United States census, Kase was living with his parents and two older siblings (Benjamin and Lena) at the same address in The Bronx. Max's profession was recorded at that time as a stenographer.

== Early years as a journalist ==
Kase began work at age 16 as an office boy for the New York Evening Mail. In approximately 1917, he joined the staff of the International News Service (INS), the wire service for the Hearst newspapers.

Kase's earliest by-lines involved the financial markets, including a June 21 story about mysterious flood of sell orders that had driven stocks to their lowest prices since 1917, and a May 1922 article about a merger between Lackawanna Steel Company and Bethlehem Steel.

In 1922, Kase began writing feature stories. In February 1922, newspapers across the country published his feature story about plans by Will Hays and others to build a model community on Long Island to lure motion picture production away from scandal-ridden Hollywood. Four months later, Kase's feature story about jazz culture and flappers received wide coverage. The story opened with the following provocative quote from psychologist Andre Tridon: "Jazz should be our national pastime: the flapper, God bless her, is the hope of the modern world. The article went on to quote Tridon suggesting that jazz should be encouraged as a means to satisfy man's "gorilla instincts":

Jazz should be encouraged. It is the modern saturnalia which allows us to satisfy our gorilla instincts in a ball room in a perfectly nice, decent, orderly and open manner. It is an excellent substitute for alcohol. There is not enough fun in our present world ...

In December 1922, Kase wrote a feature about a new form of armament developed by racing driver and engineer J. Walter Christie, which Kase described as a combination of a battleship, fort and tank that had been tested in the Hudson River and was "expected to revolutionize modern warfare." In January 1923, he wrote a pieces about a painting by Antonio da Correggio, missing since the 15th Century, that had been discovered in Brooklyn. His moving feature from February 1923 about the death of a 17-year-old boy from Manhattan's Lower East Side was also published in Hearst newspapers across the country:

The bustle of the East Side has slightly slowed, the shrill cry of pushcart peddlers is a bit subdued, while on the teeming block of Eldridge street, in the heart of the Ghetto, there is deep mourning. Sammy Rathet is dead. Sammy was only seventeen years old – but a good boy. That was admitted by the white-haired patriarchs who hobble about with canes while their long beards sway to the vagaries of the wind.

== Sportswriter in the 1920s and 1930s ==
In 1923, Kase's focus began shifted to boxing. In June 1923, he wrote a feature story about Luis Firpo, known as "The Wild Bull of The Pampas." When heavyweight champion Jack Dempsey agreed fight Firpo, Kase covered Dempsey and issued daily stories from the champ's training camp in White Sulphur Springs, New York. When Dempsey left White Sulphur Springs, Kase described the scene he left behind:

The hotel which was thronged for more than a month with tin-eared prize fighters, trainers, rubbers, and dozens of reporters, scores of vacationalists and tourists, now is silent and deserted. the lobbies which were jammed and crowded now echo hollowly with the footsteps of a forlorn bartender, a sad hearted inn-keeper and an occasional waiter.

Kase provided similar in-depth coverage leading up to the July 1923 championship bout between lightweights Benny Leonard, born in the Jewish ghetto of New York's Lower East Side, and Lew Tendler. When Leonard successfully defended his title in front of a crowd of 60,000 spectators at Yankee Stadium, Kase wrote that the title of "The Old Master," previously used to describe Joe Gans, "may now in all probability be hauled out, dusted off and placed firmly on the brow of Benny Leonard."

In 1924, Kase was sent to Cuba as the editor and general manager of The Havana Telegram. He was reported to be the youngest person at that time to hold an editorial position with a Cuban newspaper.

In 1925, Kase returned to New York as a sportswriter for Hearst's New York Journal under its longtime sports editor, Wilton S. Farnsworth.

In the early 1930s, Kase covered the National League baseball beat for the Journal and the Hearst newspaper syndicate. He also continued to cover boxing for the Hearst newspapers. Covering the bout between Kid Chocolate, "The Cuban Bon Bon," and Lew Feldman, Kase credited the Cuban with "artistically muzzling the Brownsville bulldog after fifteen rounds of classy, game battling."

In 1934, Kase was sent to Boston as the sports editor of Hearst's Boston American. During his time in Boston, Kase became acquainted with Walter A. Brown, the original owner of the Boston Celtics.

Kase returned to New York in 1935 as a sportswriter and columnist for the New York Journal and, following the merger of Hearst's morning and afternoon papers, the New York Journal-American. Upon his return to New York, Kase covered the New York Yankees and the American League baseball beat. In the spring of 1937, Kase was credited with mending a rift that had developed in 1936 between Yankees stars Tony Lazzeri and Joe DiMaggio.

When Joe Louis burst onto the scene in 1935, Kase covered Louis' training camp before the September 1935 bout at Yankee Stadium against German champion Max Baer. Kase referred to Louis as "the etherizing Detroit destroyer" and wrote about the difficulty in securing sparring partners: "There were to have been seven laboratory specimens for the Detroit destroyer to experiment on but five of the expected sparring partners, showing rare judgment, failed to appear."

In March 1936, he drew national coverage with a feature story reporting that Dizzy Dean's wife had been assigned to negotiate a new contract with the Cardinals.

In 1937, Kase was added to the committee of eight baseball writers charged with choosing the American League's Most Valuable Player.

== Sports editor at the New York Journal-American ==
In October 1938, after Wilton Farnsworth retired to become a boxing promoter, Kase replaced him as the sports editor of the New York Journal-American. Kase remained in that position for 28 years. During his time as the sports editor, Kase also wrote a popular sports column for the Journal-American called "The Brief Kase." His columns were also reprinted on occasions in The Sporting News. Kase became a fixture in New York's sporting world from the 1930s through the 1960s. In his book on the history of the NBA, Charles Rosen wrote the following about Kase:

During his career, his trademark widow's peak and devilish smile were seen at every conceivable sporting event from basketball to baseball, from football to ice hockey, from rodeos to bullfights, from six-day bicycle races to flagpole-sitting contests, as well as boxing and wrestling matches, dog shows, and track meets. Along the way, he'd met and befriended everybody who was worth knowing."

=== War bond efforts ===
During World War II, Kase was a leader in mobilizing the sporting world to assist in the sale of war bonds. In 1943, he helped sell $800 million in war bonds through a "War Bond Game" at the Polo Grounds. Kase and Journal-American sportswriter Bill Corum came up with the idea to have 26 all-stars from the three New York baseball teams play against a team of all-stars serving in the military. The game also featured an exhibition by 13 all-time baseball greats, including Babe Ruth, Walter Johnson, George Sisler, Tris Speaker, and Honus Wagner. One of the highlights of the exhibition was a home run hit by Babe Ruth into the right field stands off Walter Johnson.

In 1944, Kase became the chairman of the Fifth War Loan Sports Committee. During June 1944, Kase's committee sold $16.7 million in war bonds by organizing sporting events in New York. The events included a War Bond Day at the Aqueduct Racetrack, a golf exhibition with Byron Nelson and Jug McSpaden, a sports carnival at the Polo Grounds on June 17, 1944, and a novel three-way baseball game at the Polo Grounds on June 26, 1944, between the Brooklyn Dodgers, New York Giants, and New York Yankees.

=== Formation of the NBA ===
Kase became convinced that professional basketball could be a success on a national basis. The National Basketball League, formed in 1937, was based in the Midwest and had "limped along" while being "generally ignored" by sports editors. During the 1930s, Kase had discussions with Walter A. Brown, manager of the Boston Garden, about creating a truly national basketball league with franchises in the country's largest cities. In 1944, Kase organized a basketball exhibition in New York featuring two of the top barnstorming teams. The overflow crowd that turned out for the charity event reinforced Kase's belief that professional basketball could attract a following in New York. Kase continued to press the idea in discussions with Walter A. Brown and even drafted the new league's charter and operating plan.

In his original conception, Kase planned to own and operate the New York basketball franchise. He approached Ned Irish, the president of Madison Square Garden who had successfully promoted college basketball matches at the venue, with a proposal to lease the Garden on open dates for use by Kase's professional basketball team. Irish informed Kase that the Arena Managers Association of America, which owned the sports arenas in the largest cities, had a pact which required Madison Square Garden to own any professional basketball team that played there. However, Irish was persuaded that Kase's idea had merit and, in 1946, Irish became one of the founders of the new Basketball Association of America (BAA) and the original owner of the New York Knicks. Irish later paid Kase several thousand dollars for his role in organizing the new basketball league.

Kase's role in the formation of the BAA, which later became the NBA, has been acknowledged in several accounts of the NBA's history. One author wrote: "The impetus behind the formation of the BAA came mainly from Max Kase ..." Another noted:

The Basketball Association of America, a bastard child, sprang from the unlikely parentage of pro hockey and the Hearst press. Max Kase, sports editor of Hearst's New York Journal-American, conceived the BAA and drew up its charter ... Kase's idea was to fill those empty dates with pro basketball.

After Kase died, Walter Kennedy, the commissioner of the NBA from 1963 to 1975, said, "His personal involvement in the beginning of the NBA ... and his strong belief that pro basketball was destined to be a major sport were important factors in the growth and success of the NBA."

=== 1951 point-shaving scandals ===
In the late 1940s, there were rumors and suspicions that college basketball players were being paid by bookies to engage in point-shaving. Kase later wrote that the Journal-American had been probing tips and leads for several years, but had been "bumping into impenetrable stone walls in past years." Kase began interviewing acquaintances in the gambling community. During the 1948–1949 season, Kase assigned a reporter to investigate the story on a full-time basis. Over the following year, Kase and the reporter devoted much of their time to the investigation. Concerned that his sportswriters may have connections to the players or gamblers, he secured additional assistance from several of the Journal-American's best crime reporters.

The Journal-American's investigation eventually focused on Eddie Gard, a player for the Long Island University basketball team who was believed to be acting as a bagman for the gambling interests. In early January 1951, Kase met secretly with New York District Attorney Frank Hogan. Kase shared his findings with Hogan and agreed to withhold the story until Hogan could develop the case further. Using the evidence collected by Kase, Hogan began tailing Gard and tapped his phone. The investigation resulted in the arrest and prosecution of three star players from the City College of New York's 1950 national championship team.

In exchange for his cooperation, Hogan gave Kase the exclusive rights to the inside story when the arrests were made in mid-January 1951. Kase wrote in the Journal-American that "a first blush of sympathy for the corrupted weaklings has given way to a cold rage because of their lack of loyalty to their school and a calloused greed for their Judas pieces of silver." After Kase's expose, the point shaving scandal spread as players at Long Island University, the University of Kentucky and Bradley University were also implicated. It was ultimately shown that five players on Kentucky's 1949 NCAA championship team were involved or implicated in point shaving. Two of the players were suspended for life by the NBA, and Kentucky did not play the 1952–1953 season because of the scandal. The college basketball point shaving scandals uncovered by Kase were considered the most serious in American sports since the 1919 Black Sox Scandal.

In 1952, Kase was presented with a Pulitzer Special Citation for his work on the story. The full citation provided by the Pulitzer Prizes today is: "For his exclusive exposures of bribery and other forms of corruption in the popular American sport of basketball, which exposures tended to restore confidence in the game's integrity." In May, a testimonial dinner was held at Toots Shor's Restaurant in Manhattan, attended by 200 of the leading figures in the sports world, including baseball commissioner Ford Frick, journalist Grantland Rice, and Bugs Baer. District Attorney Frank Hogan paid tribute to Kase at the dinner: "I humbly and contritely express my appreciation for what Max Kase did ... This was the act of a person conscious of the welfare of the community."

=== Other accomplishments ===
Kase had many other successes during his tenure as sports editor of the Journal-American. In 1941, Kase founded the Hearst sandlot baseball program. In 1947, he organized an annual all-star game featuring the best players selected from local all-star games in cities with Hearst newspapers. The national all-star game was played at the Polo Grounds in New York and was called the Hearst Sandlot Classic. Kase solicited Babe Ruth to serve as chairman of the event. The Hearst sandlot program ultimately produced 50 Major League Baseball players, including all-stars Whitey Ford, Al Kaline, Joe Torre, Tony Kubek, Bill Freehan, Mike Marshall, and Bill Skowron.

In 1950, Kase founded the B'nai B'rith New York Sports Lodge as part of the Anti-Defamation League's campaign to promote religious tolerance and fight anti-Semitism. Kase twice served terms as president of the lodge, which was renamed the Max Kase Sports Lodge in 1975.

In 1956, Israel's national basketball team was unable to compete in the 1956 Summer Olympics as a result of the hostilities associated with the Suez Crisis. Accordingly, Kase, with sponsorship from the New York Journal-American, organized a United States February 1957 tour by the Israeli basketball team with games played in Boston, Baltimore, Pittsburgh, Detroit, Los Angeles, and San Francisco.

In October 1964, the New York Rangers banned the Journal-American's hockey reporter, Stan Fischler, from the dressing room and press room after taking issue with one of Fischler's stories. Kase called the Rangers and informed them that "the Journal-American would not carry a single line of Rangers' news until the ban was lifted." The Rangers promptly lifted the ban. Fischler later recalled, "Unfortunately, there aren't many editors like Max Kase around."

In 1966, the New York Journal-American went out of business. Kase retired upon the publication of the paper's final edition on April 24, 1966.

== Later years and family ==
After retiring from the New York Journal-American, Kase continued to write a column which was published in The Taxi News. In 1969, Kase opened a pub called the "Briefkase" in Manhattan's Port Authority Bus Terminal. He later opened a second "Briefkase" pub near Madison Square Garden.

Kase was a bachelor for much of his life. In June 1945, he married Kay Gallagher. Kase died in March 1974 at Yonkers General Hospital after suffering a heart attack at his home. He was 76 years old at the time of his death.
