= Bob Ferguson (pitcher) =

American baseball player (1919–2008)

- Pitcher
- Born: April 18, 1919; Birmingham, Alabama, U.S.
- Died: May 23, 2008 (aged 89); Wetumpka, Alabama, U.S.
- Batted: Right Threw: Right

MLB debut
- April 29, 1944, for the Cincinnati Reds

Last MLB appearance
- June 3, 1944, for the Cincinnati Reds

MLB statistics
- Win–loss record: 0–3
- Earned run average: 9.00
- Strikeouts: 9
- Stats at Baseball Reference

Teams
- Cincinnati Reds (1944)

Robert Lester Ferguson (April 18, 1919 – May 23, 2008) was an American Major League Baseball pitcher. He appeared in nine games, including two starts, for the Cincinnati Reds in 1944. He pitched professionally for thirteen years, playing in the minor leagues from 1938 until 1950.
