= Willard Mullin =

American sports cartoonist

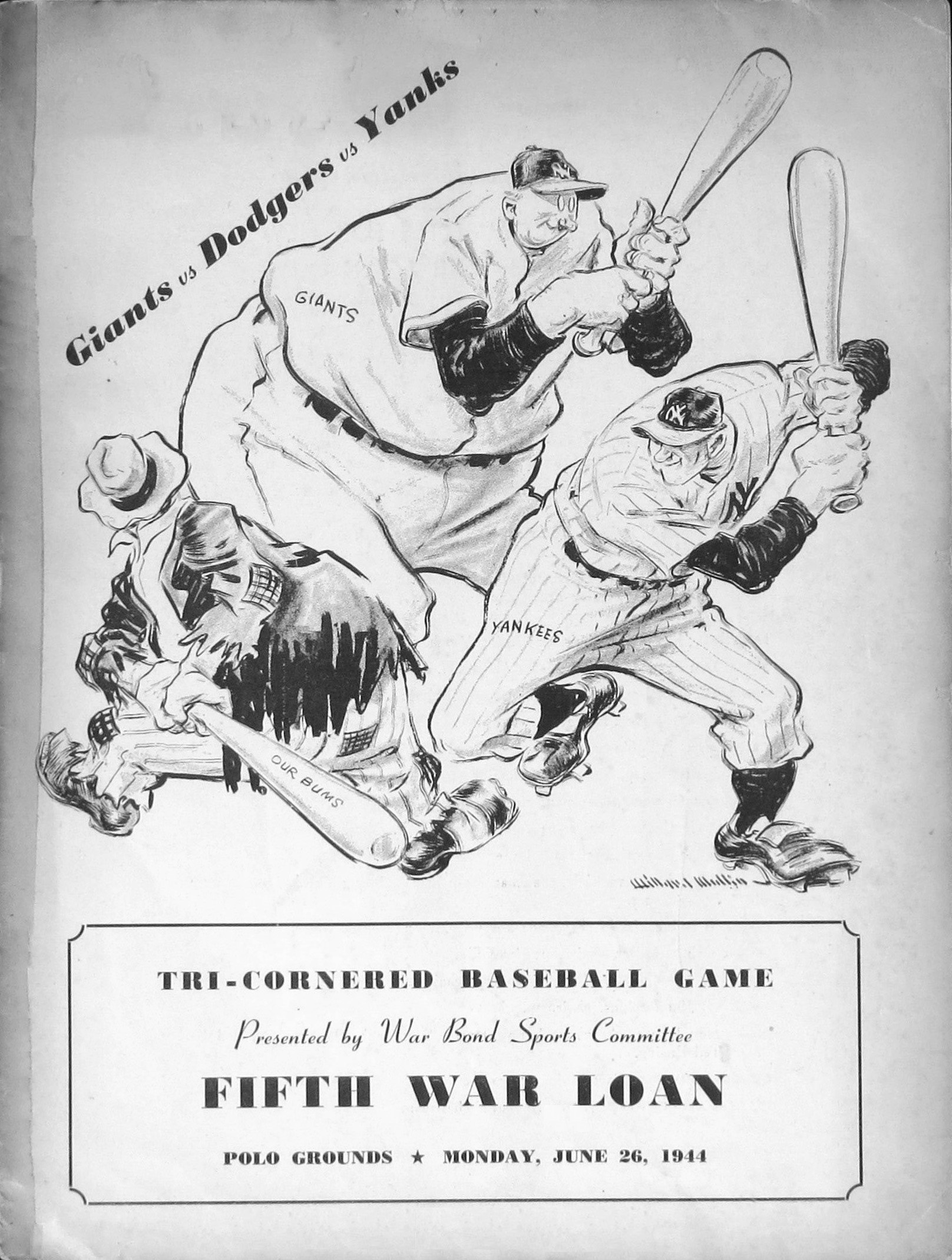
Tri-Cornered Baseball Game, Giants vs Dodgers vs Yanks, 1944 cartoon by Willard Mullin for program cover

Willard Mullin (September 14, 1902 – December 20, 1978) was an American sports cartoonist. He is most famous for his creation of the "Brooklyn Bum", the personification of the Brooklyn Dodgers baseball team, based on circus clown Emmett Kelly's "Weary Willie" hobo persona. He was widely published: he cartooned daily for Scripps-Howard's New York World-Telegram and Sun for decades and was often published in Scripps-Howard's twenty papers, as well as in the Sporting News.

== Publications ==
Mullin was often commissioned to draw cover illustrations for yearbooks of the Brooklyn Dodgers, the New York Giants, and---after those teams moved to the West Coast---the New York Mets. Mullin also did covers for Harlem Globetrotters yearbooks. When the Mets looked to be winning the National League East in 1969, Time commissioned Mullin to draw a cover for a feature on the team. Jerry Mitchell's history of the early Mets, The Amazin' Mets, featured several previously published Mullin cartoons illustrating their early struggles.

An oversize retrospective collection of Willard Mullin cartoons, titled Willard Mullin's Golden Age of Baseball: Drawings 1934–1972, was published by Fantagraphics Books in 2013. The book also contains biographical and historical information. In 2015, Fantagraphics Books published Willard Mullin's Casey at the Bat and Other Diamond Tales. This book features Mullin's thirteen drawings to match the thirteen verses of Ernest Thayer's famous baseball poem, the poem as written in Mullin's once-celebrated cartoon lettering style, and a few selections from Mullin's other baseball cartoons. Until the Fantagraphics publication, the Mullin "Casey" had only ever been seen by those who attended an early 1950s convention of the National Association, then the overseers of Minor League Baseball and were given copies of the Mullin "Casey."

== Awards ==
He received the Reuben Award in 1954 for his work, as well as the National Cartoonists Society Sports Cartoon Award for each year from 1957 through 1962, and again in 1964 and 1965.
