= Tri-Cornered Baseball Game =

1944 exhibition baseball game

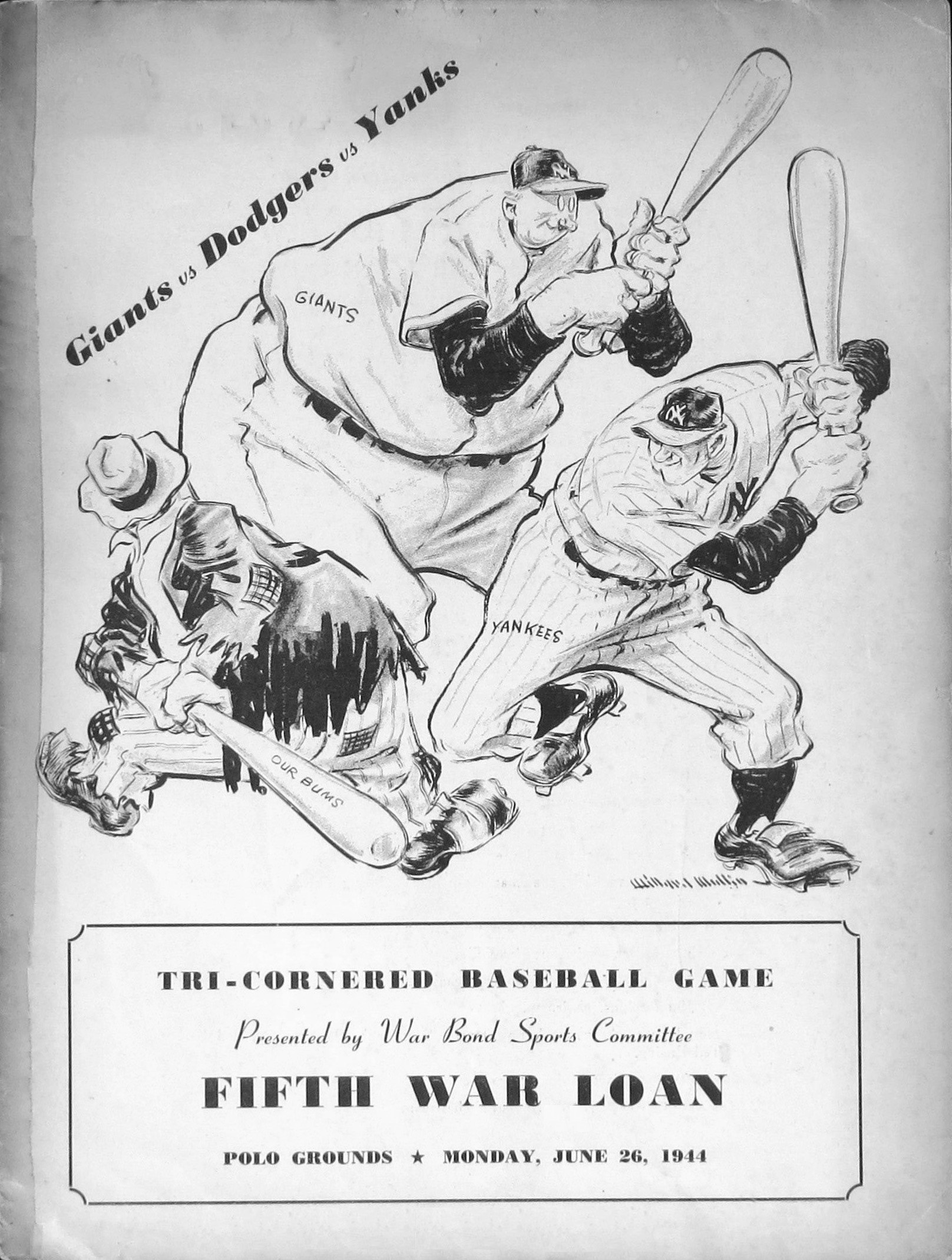
Tri-Cornered Baseball Game program cover with cartoon by Willard Mullin

The Tri-Cornered Baseball Game was a three-way exhibition baseball game held at the Polo Grounds on June 26, 1944, among the Brooklyn Dodgers, New York Giants and New York Yankees. The game, a World War II fundraiser, was played with a round-robin format in which each team batted and fielded during six innings and rested for the other three. The Dodgers won by scoring five runs in their times at bat; the Yankees scored one run, while the Giants were unable to score.

== Background ==
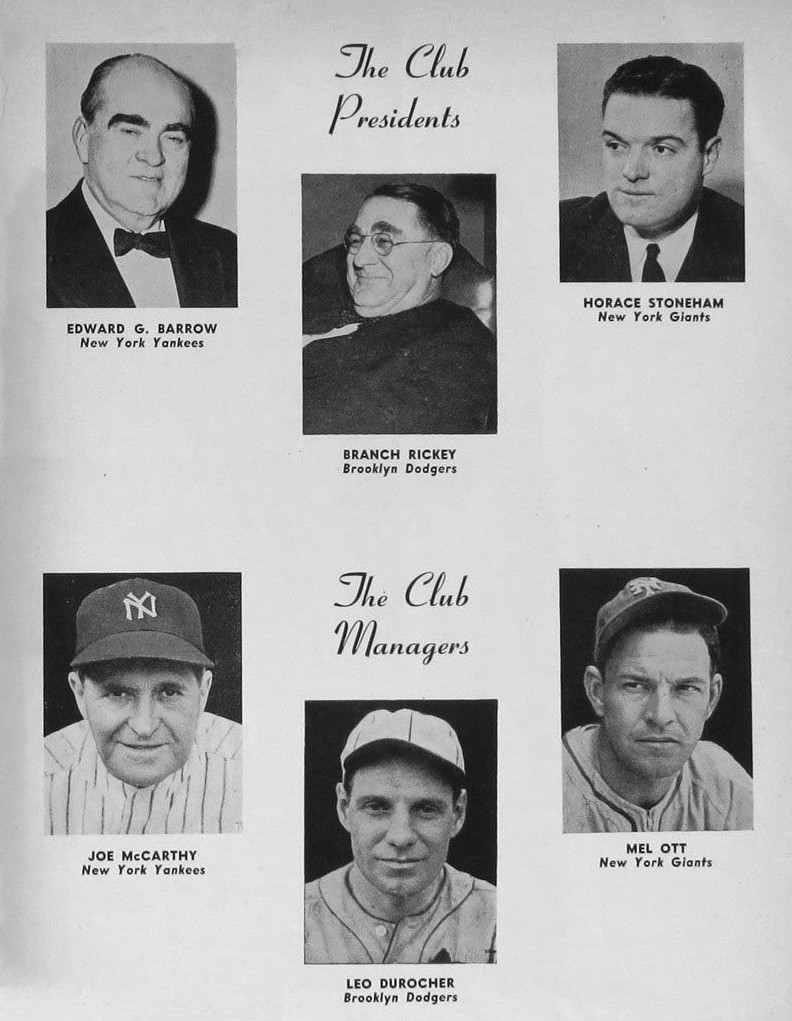
The club presidents and club managers

The game came 20 days after the Normandy landings in 1944. It was devised by the War Loans Sports Committee as a method of selling war bonds to aid in the U.S. war efforts. Previously, Major League Baseball teams had each contributed revenue from one game's ticket sales to the war effort in 1943, while the New York City-based teams had helped to create an early fantasy baseball league named the "Baseball War Bond League". Committee chairman Max Kase, an editor for the New York Journal-American newspaper, played a key role in conceiving the contest, one of several sporting events that spurred bond sales. The Dodgers, Giants, and Yankees were to play each other in a three-way exhibition game at the Polo Grounds on June 26. Tickets were sold to fans in the form of the war bonds. Forty thousand unreserved tickets were sold for a $25 war bond each, with almost 10,000 reserved and box seats available for $100 or $1,000 bonds.

All three teams had win–loss records above .500 entering the exhibition. The Dodgers had a 33–30 win–loss record in the 1944 season and had won their previous five games. The Giants and Yankees had similar marks, at 32–29 and 31–29, respectively.

As with other Major League Baseball (MLB) clubs, the three New York City-based teams were fielding short-handed rosters, as many of their regulars were taking part in the war. The Yankees were missing their regular center fielder from previous seasons, Joe DiMaggio, while Johnny Mize was among the players absent from the Giants. The Dodgers' roster included shortstop Tommy Brown, who at the time was 16 years old and one of the youngest players to ever appear in an MLB game. However, Hall of Fame members Ernie Lombardi, Joe Medwick, and Paul Waner were among the participants. The managers were the same as usual for the teams: Leo Durocher for the Dodgers, Joe McCarthy for the Yankees, and Mel Ott for the Giants. Ott made an appearance as an outfielder as well.

== Format ==
Mathematician Paul Althaus Smith was consulted to help with formatting the unique game. Under the round-robin system devised, the three teams were each to bat and field for two innings in a row before taking a one-inning break. By the end, all three sides were scheduled to play in six innings each during a nine-inning game, and were slated to face their opponents for an equal amount of time, while batting and while playing defensively. This format meant that the teams would hit against each opponent three times. According to Smith, he had to use a slide rule while helping to keep score of the game.

The Giants were able to use their usual home dugout at the Polo Grounds, while the visitors' dugout was occupied by both the Dodgers and Yankees. In response to the nature of the contest, one writer made a sarcastic recommendation that the organizers hire traffic police "to avoid snarls of various descriptions." The game was to end after nine innings even if two or more teams tied for the most runs scored.

== Game summary ==
Prior to the start of the game, a series of skills contests were conducted. First, hitters used fungo bats to hit balls for distance; the longest blow was recorded by Brooklyn pitcher Cal McLish, who hit a ball over 410 feet. Then, catchers took part in a contest designed to test their throwing accuracy. A barrel was set up at second base and catchers attempted to throw a ball inside it from home plate. The Dodgers' Bobby Bragan was the winner. Sprints were also held, and former player Al Schacht made an appearance. The United States Coast Guard Band provided musical performances, having been introduced by Milton Berle.

At 8:45 p.m., the contest started. The Dodgers and Yankees were the first two teams to play in the game, as Brooklyn batted in the first inning against Yankees pitcher Al Lyons. Following a single by Goody Rosen, Augie Galan and Dixie Walker also had base hits, which led to the first run of the contest. Brooklyn did not add to their total in the inning, but held the Yankees scoreless in their half. The Giants entered the game in the second inning, as the Yankees rested. Against Giants pitcher Johnny Allen, the Dodgers padded their early lead. A walk by Mickey Owen was followed by an Eddie Stanky double, which plated Owen for Brooklyn's second run. Later in the inning, Stanky scored on a single by Frenchy Bordagaray. The Giants failed to score against the Dodgers in their turn at bat. The Yankees and Giants took part in the third inning; neither club managed to score.

The Dodgers and Yankees played during the fourth inning, the Giants and Dodgers took the field for the fifth, and the Yankees and Giants competed in the sixth. No further runs were scored in this stretch. The scoreless run continued in the seventh inning (the Dodgers and Yankees batted), before Brooklyn extended their lead in the eighth. Against Giants pitcher Frank Seward, Luis Olmo hit a single. Giants right fielder Danny Gardella then dove for a fly ball hit by Jack Bolling, but missed, enabling Bolling to reach third with a triple, which scored Olmo. Stanky then hit a sacrifice fly, which plated Bolling for Brooklyn's fifth run of the game. The Dodgers' play concluded with the end of the eighth inning, as the Yankees and Giants played in the ninth inning. The Yankees scored once in the ninth, as a single by Snuffy Stirnweiss was followed by a pair of fielding errors by Giant Buddy Kerr that allowed Stirnweiss to give the Yankees their only run of the game. The contest ended with the Dodgers having scored five runs, the Yankees one, and the Giants having been held scoreless. Although the Dodgers had won the game, they were not present when it finished. Following the eighth inning, the team left the Polo Grounds to travel to Chicago for a June 28 doubleheader.

== Box score ==
Monday, June 26, 1944 at Polo Grounds in Manhattan, New York
Team	1	2	3	4	5	6	7	8	9	R	H	E
Brooklyn Dodgers	1	2	X	0	0	X	0	2	X	5	9	1
New York Yankees	0	X	0	0	X	0	0	X	1	1	4	0
New York Giants	X	0	0	X	0	0	X	0	0	0	2	2

== Reaction ==
The three-way baseball game was attended by over 50,000 fans. A total of 49,605 people paid for tickets by buying war bonds. In addition, 500 injured veterans were given free admission. Ticket sales from the game raised about $4.5 million. In addition, the mayor of New York City, Fiorello La Guardia, pledged $50 million of bonds, and an additional $1 million was contributed by Bond Clothing Stores in exchange for an autographed program. Overall, more than $56 million was raised. New York Daily News sportswriter Dick Young described the event as "the wackiest diamond battle ever conceived".
