= Jodie Beeler =

American baseball player (1921–2002)

- Infielder
- Born: November 26, 1921; Dallas, Texas, U.S.
- Died: October 8, 2002 (aged 80); Mesquite, Texas, U.S.
- Batted: Right Threw: Right

MLB debut
- September 21, 1944, for the Cincinnati Reds

Last MLB appearance
- October 1, 1944, for the Cincinnati Reds

MLB statistics
- Batting average: .000
- Games played: 3
- At bats: 3
- Stats at Baseball Reference

Teams
- Cincinnati Reds (1944)

Joseph Sam Beeler (November 26, 1921 – October 8, 2002) was an American infielder in Major League Baseball. He played in three games for the Cincinnati Reds during the 1944 baseball season.

Beeler had a long minor league baseball career that spanned 18 seasons, including four years with the Syracuse Mets, (then called the Chiefs), and four seasons with the Dallas Rangers, known as the Dallas Eagles during the 1950's. Beeler was a versatile fielder, playing at least ten games at every position except pitcher and catcher.
