= Buck Fausett =

American baseball player (1908–1994)

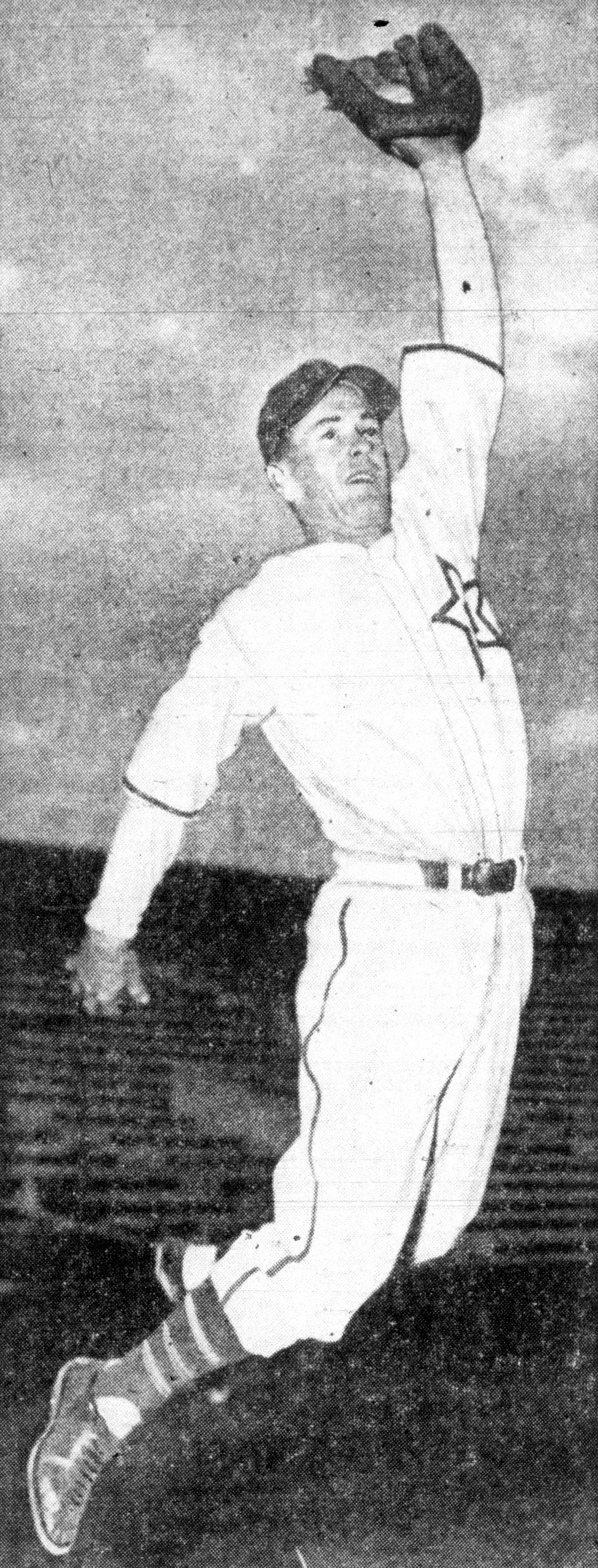
- Fausett, circa 1945
- Third baseman / Pitcher
- Born: April 8, 1908; Sheridan, Arkansas, U.S.
- Died: May 2, 1994 (age 86); College Station, Texas, U.S.
- Batted: Left Threw: Right

MLB debut
- April 18, 1944, for the Cincinnati Reds

Last MLB appearance
- June 10, 1944, for the Cincinnati Reds

MLB statistics
- Hits: 3
- Earned run average: 5.91
- Strikeouts: 3
- Stats at Baseball Reference

Teams
- Cincinnati Reds (1944)

Robert Shaw "Buck" Fausett (April 8, 1908 – May 2, 1994), also nicknamed "Leaky", was an American professional baseball player and manager. A 19-year veteran minor leaguer who got into over 2,200 games, mostly in higher-level circuits, he appeared in 13 major league contests for the 1944 Cincinnati Reds during the World War II manpower shortage. He was born in Sheridan, Arkansas, and attended East Texas State Teachers College. Fausett batted left-handed, threw right-handed, and was listed as 5 feet 10 inches (1.78 m) tall and 170 pounds (77 kg).

== Major league career ==
Fausett's brief major league career occurred during the outset of the 1944 campaign. Fausett's first 11 games in a Red uniform were as a pinch hitter and third baseman; he collected only two hits in 28 at bats for a .071 batting average. In his 12th game, June 1 against the Philadelphia Phillies, Fausett batted for starting pitcher Tommy de la Cruz in the third inning with Cincinnati trailing, 4–2. After making a fly ball out in that role, he remained in the game as a relief pitcher and worked the next four innings pitched, allowing two earned runs before he was himself removed for a pinch hitter. The Reds lost the game, 8–7.

== Preceded Nuxhall's historic debut ==
Nine days later, he made his second appearance as a relief pitcher and played his last major league game. He also became part of history. On June 10 at Crosley Field, Fausett was called into a lopsided contest against the future 1944 World Series champion St. Louis Cardinals in the second inning. He was already Cincinnati's third pitcher of the day and the Cardinals had built a 7–0 lead. Fausett was able to retire Marty Marion and Mort Cooper, and he remained in the game through the eighth inning, allowing six runs (five earned), ten hits, and six bases on balls. He left the game after the eighth frame with St. Louis in command, 13–0.

The 36-year-old Fausett's replacement on the mound in the ninth inning was left-hander Joe Nuxhall, a former local high school standout making his major league debut at the age of 15, still the record for the youngest player in major league history. Nuxhall faced nine Cardinal batters, surrendering two hits, five bases on balls and five more runs, while recording two outs. Nuxhall was then sent to the minor leagues, and did not return to the Reds until 1952, where he forged a long career as a pitcher and later as a broadcaster.

Fausett also departed the Reds after that 18–0 defeat. In his 13 games, he collected three total hits, one of them a triple (batting .097); as a pitcher, he registered three strikeouts but allowed 13 hits, seven walks, and seven earned runs in 10 2/3 innings pitched. He joined the top-level Hollywood Stars of the Pacific Coast League later in 1944, then became their player-manager for 1945 and part of 1946. His minor league playing career continued through 1948, with a brief return to active duty in 1952. From the late 1940s into the mid-1950s, he also became an owner and general manager of minor league teams such as the Amarillo Gold Sox and Albuquerque Dukes.

Preceded by Charlie Root	Hollywood Stars manager 1945–1946	Succeeded by Jimmy Dykes
