= John Pappalau =

American baseball player (1875–1944)

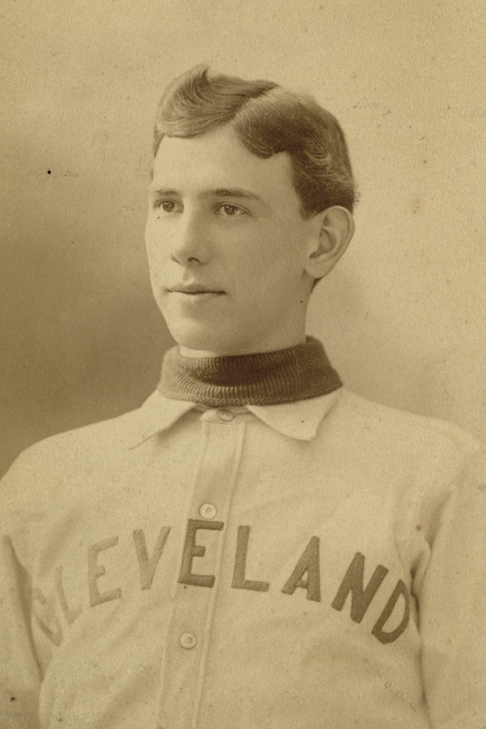
- Pitcher
- Born: April 3, 1875; Albany, New York, U.S.
- Died: May 12, 1944 (aged 69); Albany, New York, U.S.
- Batted: Right Threw: Right

MLB debut
- June 9, 1897, for the Cleveland Spiders

Last MLB appearance
- June 22, 1897, for the Cleveland Spiders

MLB statistics
- Win–loss record: 1–0
- Earned run average: 10.50
- Strikeouts: 3
- Stats at Baseball Reference

Teams
- Cleveland Spiders (1897)

John Joseph Pappalau (April 3, 1875 – May 12, 1944) was an American pitcher in Major League Baseball. He played for the Cleveland Spiders in 1897.

In 1893, Pappalau broke into baseball by playing for an independent team in Gloversville, New York. He attended Pittsfield High School in Pittsfield, Massachusetts where, after a game in 1894, he was persuaded by a fan to play college baseball for the College of the Holy Cross. His batterymate at Holy Cross was Doc Powers.
