= Mickey Kreitner =

American baseball player (1922–2003)

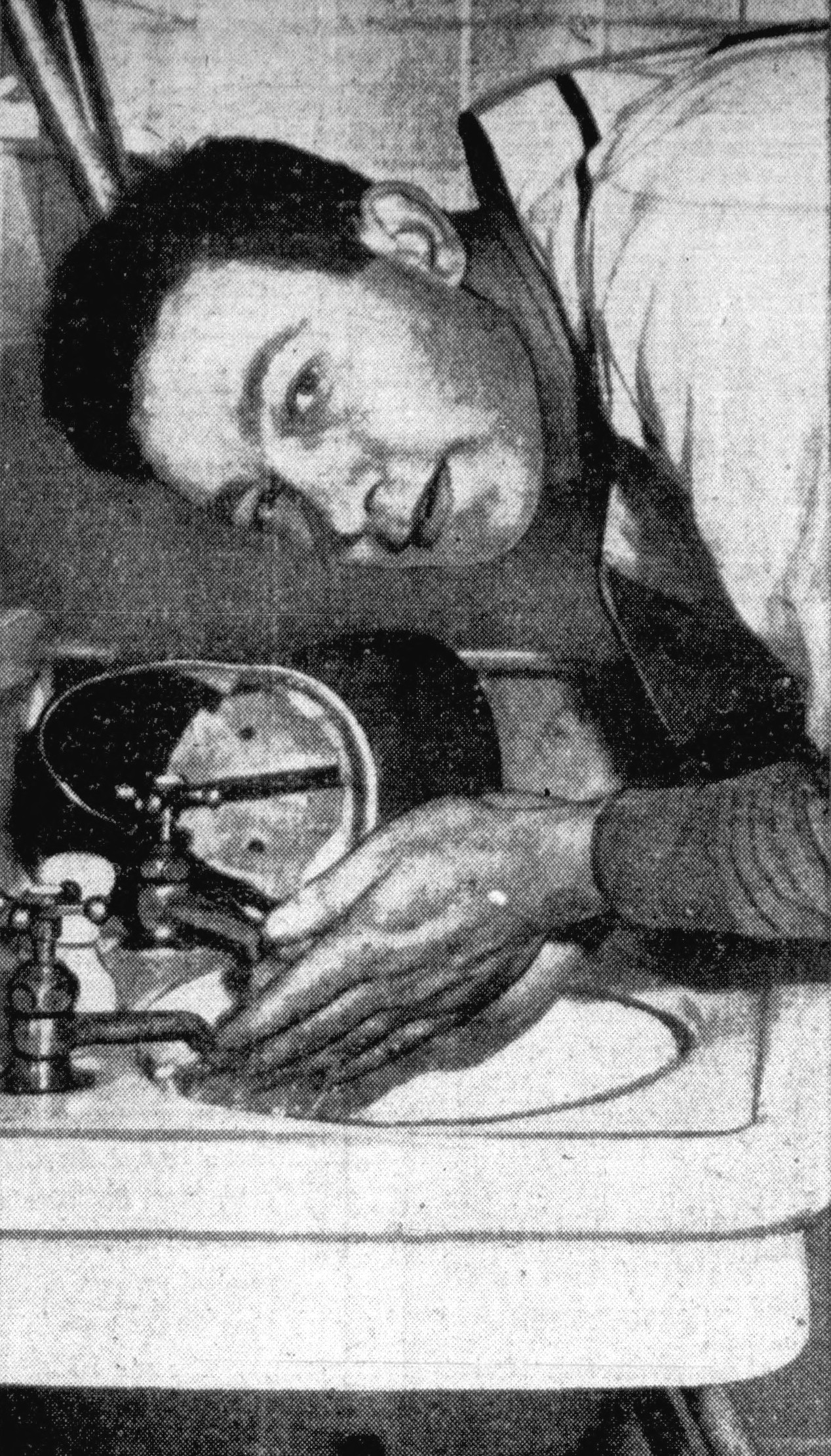
- Kreitner, circa 1945
- Catcher
- Born: October 10, 1922; Nashville, Tennessee, U.S.
- Died: March 6, 2003 (aged 80); Nashville, Tennessee, U.S.
- Batted: Right Threw: Right

MLB debut
- September 28, 1943, for the Chicago Cubs

Last MLB appearance
- August 17, 1944, for the Chicago Cubs

MLB statistics
- Batting average: .172
- Home runs: 0
- Runs batted in: 3
- Stats at Baseball Reference

Teams
- Chicago Cubs (1943–1944)

Albert Joseph "Mickey" Kreitner (October 10, 1922 – March 6, 2003) was an American Major League Baseball (MLB) catcher who played for the Chicago Cubs during the 1943 and 1944 seasons. Listed at 6' 3", 190 lb., he batted and threw right handed.

As a 20-year-old rookie in 1943, Kreitner was the tenth youngest player to appear in a National League game. He was a typical example of what veteran catcher Mike González termed "good field, no hit" player.

Kreitner was one of many ballplayers who only appeared in the major leagues during World War II. He debuted with the Cubs on September 28, 1943 in a home doubleheader against the New York Giants at Wrigley Field.

In a 42-game career, Kreitner posted a batting average of .172 (16-for-93), which included 14 singles and two doubles, scoring three runs while driving in three more. In limited playing time he had good numbers as a catcher, handling 126 out of 127 chances successfully for a solid .992 fielding percentage.

Kreitner died in his hometown of Nashville, Tennessee, at the age of 80, following complications from cancer.
