= Jake Eisenhart =

American baseball player (1922–1987)

- Pitcher
- Born: October 3, 1922; Perkasie, Pennsylvania
- Died: December 20, 1987 (aged 65); Huntingdon, Pennsylvania
- Batted: Left Threw: Left

MLB debut
- June 10, 1944, for the Cincinnati Reds

Last MLB appearance
- June 10, 1944, for the Cincinnati Reds

MLB statistics
- Win–loss record: 0–0
- Earned run average: 0.00
- Strikeouts: 0
- WHIP: 3.00
- Stats at Baseball Reference

Teams
- Cincinnati Reds (1944)

Jacob Henry "Ol' Jake" Eisenhart (October 3, 1922 – December 20, 1987) was an American left-handed pitcher in Major League Baseball who appeared in one game for the Cincinnati Reds in 1944. The 6'3½", 195 lb. left-hander was a native of Perkasie, Pennsylvania.

Eisenhart is one of many ballplayers who only appeared in the major leagues during World War II. After attending Juniata College, he was signed by the Reds to a 30-day trial contract, but his only big league action came on June 10, 1944 in a home game against the St. Louis Cardinals at Crosley Field. He entered the game with two out in the top of the ninth inning, and the Reds behind 18–0. The pitcher he came in to relieve was 15-year-old Joe Nuxhall, who had just made his major league debut. Eisenhart walked the first batter he faced, George Fallon, then got the last out, retiring opposing pitcher Mort Cooper on a foul out. His total major league experience ended up lasting only 1/3 of an inning. He was released by the Reds on June 24. Eisenhart also served in the Army during World War II, and toiled three years in the Philadelphia Athletics organization, but never made it back to the major leagues. He died in 1987 in Huntingdon, Pennsylvania.
