= Charlie Vinson =

American baseball player (born 1944)

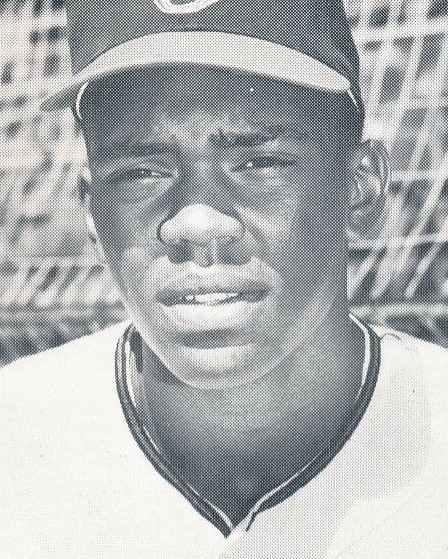
- First baseman
- Born: January 5, 1944 (age 82); Washington, D.C., U.S.
- Batted: Left Threw: Left

MLB debut
- September 19, 1966, for the California Angels

Last MLB appearance
- October 2, 1966, for the California Angels

MLB statistics
- Batting average: .182
- Home runs: 1
- Runs batted in: 6
- Stats at Baseball Reference

Teams
- California Angels (1966)

Charles Anthony Vinson (born January 5, 1944, in Washington, D.C.) is an American former professional baseball player. A first baseman, he had an 11-year professional career, although his tenure in Major League Baseball consisted of 13 games for the 1966 California Angels. He threw and batted left-handed, stood 6 feet 3 inches (1.91 m) tall and weighed 207 pounds (94 kg).

== Career ==
Vinson was signed originally by the New York Yankees but played only one year in the Rookie-level Appalachian League before the Angels selected him in the 1963 first-year player draft. He spent three full years in the Angels' farm system and was called up in September 1966 after a 19-home run, 84-RBI season in the Pacific Coast League. He started seven games at first base during the 1966 season's final month. On September 25, against the eventual world champion Baltimore Orioles, Vinson collected two hits and four runs batted in, paving the way to a 6–1 Angel victory. One of the hits was Vinson's only MLB home run, hit off relief pitcher Eddie Fisher, a knuckleballer. Vinson's home run came when he was given a second chance after Orioles second baseman Bob Johnson dropped a foul fly hit by Vinson for an error.

Vinson also had two doubles among his four Major League hits to go along with his home run. He retired in 1973.
