= John J. Pinder Jr. =

United States Army soldier

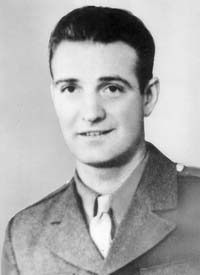
- Born: June 6, 1912; McKees Rocks, Pennsylvania, US
- Died: June 6, 1944 (aged 32) near Colleville-sur-Mer, France
- Burial place: Grandview Cemetery, Florence, Pennsylvania
- Military career
- Allegiance: United States of America
- Branch: United States Army
- Service years: 1942–1944
- Rank: Technician Fifth Grade
- Units: 16th Infantry Regiment, 1st Infantry Division
- Conflicts: World War II; Italian Campaign; Operation Husky; Northern France; Operation Overlord †
- Awards: Medal of Honor; Bronze Star; Purple Heart

John Joseph Pinder Jr. (June 6, 1912 – June 6, 1944) was a United States Army soldier and a recipient of the United States military's highest decoration—the Medal of Honor—for his actions in World War II during the Battle of Normandy.

== Biography ==
Pinder was born on June 6, 1912, in McKees Rocks, Pennsylvania, and played minor league baseball for six seasons in the organizations of the Cleveland Indians, New York Yankees, and Washington Senators (1901-1960). A right-handed pitcher, in 1941 he won 17 games and had a 2.93 ERA in a season divided between the Fort Pierce Bombers of the Florida East Coast League and the Greenville Lions (baseball) of the Alabama State League.

He was drafted into the Army from Burgettstown, Pennsylvania in January 1942, and after initial training was assigned to Headquarters Company, 16th Infantry Regiment, 1st Infantry Division. In the vicinity of Gangi, Sicily, Pinder's heroic actions on July 23, 1943, earned him the Bronze Star Medal (posthumously). By June 6, 1944, was serving as a Technician Fifth Grade. On that day, he participated in the Allied landings near Colleville-sur-Mer, France. Despite being twice wounded, Pinder refused medical attention and continued to gather communications equipment in order to establish a radio link on the beach before receiving a third and fatal wound. He was posthumously awarded the Medal of Honor seven months later, on January 4, 1945.

Pinder, killed on his 32nd birthday, was buried in Grandview Cemetery, Florence, Pennsylvania. The U.S. Army barracks in Zirndorf, Germany, were named Pinder Barracks in his honor. Although these barracks were abandoned in the years after 1999, the name Pinder remained by decision of the city administration as the newly formed city district "Pinder Park".

US Army Transportation Corps coastal cargo ship FS 398 was named Cpl John J. Pinder Jr. in his honor.

== Medal of Honor citation ==
Technician Pinder's official Medal of Honor citation reads:

For conspicuous gallantry and intrepidity above and beyond the call of duty on 6 June 1944, near Colleville-sur-Mer, France. On D-day, Technician 5th Grade Pinder landed on the coast 100 yards off shore under devastating enemy machinegun and artillery fire which caused severe casualties among the boatload. Carrying a vitally important radio, he struggled towards shore in waist-deep water. Only a few yards from his craft he was hit by enemy fire and was gravely wounded. Technician 5th Grade Pinder never stopped. He made shore and delivered the radio. Refusing to take cover afforded, or to accept medical attention for his wounds, Technician 5th Grade Pinder, though terribly weakened by loss of blood and in fierce pain, on 3 occasions went into the fire-swept surf to salvage communication equipment. He recovered many vital parts and equipment, including another workable radio. On the 3rd trip he was again hit, suffering machinegun bullet wounds in the legs. Still this valiant soldier would not stop for rest or medical attention. Remaining exposed to heavy enemy fire, growing steadily weaker, he aided in establishing the vital radio communication on the beach. While so engaged this dauntless soldier was hit for the third time and killed. The indomitable courage and personal bravery of Technician 5th Grade Pinder was a magnificent inspiration to the men with whom he served.

== Awards and decorations ==
Technician Fifth Grade John Joseph Pinder's awards include :

Badge	Combat Infantryman Badge		
1st row	Medal of Honor		
2nd row	Bronze Star Medal with 1 Oak leaf cluster	Purple Heart	Army Good Conduct Medal
3rd row	American Campaign Medal	European–African–Middle Eastern Campaign Medal with Arrowhead Device and 2 Campaign stars	World War II Victory Medal
Unit awards	Presidential Unit Citation with 1 Oak leaf cluster		

== See also ==
- List of Medal of Honor recipients
- List of Medal of Honor recipients for World War II
