= Garth Mann =

American baseball player (1915–1980)

- Pitcher
- Born: November 16, 1915; Brandon, Texas, U.S.
- Died: September 11, 1980 (aged 64); Waxahachie, Texas, U.S.
- Batted: Right Threw: Right

MLB debut
- May 14, 1944, for the Chicago Cubs

Last MLB appearance
- May 14, 1944, for the Chicago Cubs

MLB statistics
- Plate appearances: 0
- Runs: 1
- Innings pitched: 0.0
- Stats at Baseball Reference

Teams
- Chicago Cubs (1944)

Ben Garth Mann (November 16, 1915 – September 11, 1980) was an American professional baseball pitcher who appeared as a pinch runner for the Chicago Cubs of Major League Baseball (MLB) in 1944. His one MLB appearance was on May 14, 1944, in the second game of a double-header against the Brooklyn Dodgers, when he ran for Lou Novikoff and scored a run on a single by Andy Pafko. Six days later he was optioned to the minors and never appeared in another Major League game.
