= Len Rice =

American baseball player (1918–1992)

- Catcher
- Born: September 2, 1918; Lead, South Dakota, U.S.
- Died: June 13, 1992 (aged 73); Sonora, California, U.S.
- Batted: Right Threw: Right

MLB debut
- April 26, 1944, for the Cincinnati Reds

Last MLB appearance
- September 29, 1945, for the Chicago Cubs

MLB statistics
- Batting average: .223
- Home runs: 0
- Runs batted in: 7
- Stats at Baseball Reference

Teams
- Cincinnati Reds (1944); Chicago Cubs (1945)

Career highlights and awards
- Member of 1945 NL champion Chicago Cubs; did not play in 1945 World Series

Leonard Oliver Rice (September 2, 1918 – June 13, 1992) was an American Major League Baseball catcher who played for the Cincinnati Reds (1944) and the Chicago Cubs (1945). A native of Lead, South Dakota, he stood 6 feet (1.8 m) tall and weighed 175 pounds (79 kg).

Rice is one of many ballplayers who only appeared in the major leagues during World War II. He may be most well known for being a reserve catcher on the last Chicago Cubs team to win a National League pennant (1945). That was his best season, as he got into 32 games and hit .232 (23-for-99) with 7 runs batted in and 10 runs scored. He had played in just 10 games for the Reds the year before, going 0-for-4, then was drafted by the Cubs from the Reds in the 1944 rule V draft (November 1).

He died at the age of 73 in Sonora, California.
