= Joe Just =

American baseball player (1916–2003)

- Catcher
- Born: January 8, 1916; Milwaukee, Wisconsin, U.S.
- Died: November 22, 2003 (aged 87); Franklin, Wisconsin, U.S.
- Batted: Right Threw: Right

MLB debut
- May 13, 1944, for the Cincinnati Reds

Last MLB appearance
- May 13, 1945, for the Cincinnati Reds

MLB statistics
- Batting average: .159
- Home runs: 0
- Runs batted in: 2
- Stats at Baseball Reference

Teams
- Cincinnati Reds (1944–1945)

Joseph Erwin Just (born Joseph Erwin Juszczak) (January 8, 1916 – November 22, 2003) was an American Major League Baseball catcher who broke into the Major Leagues on May 13, 1944, with the Cincinnati Reds of the National League. Just appeared in 25 games over two years with the Reds during World War II and returned to the minor leagues when the majority of players returned from military service. Later, Just managed various Milwaukee Braves minor league teams from 1955 to 1958.
