= 1944 Brooklyn Dodgers season =

1944 Brooklyn Dodgers
- League: National League
- Ballpark: Ebbets Field
- City: Brooklyn, New York
- Record: 63–91 (.409)
- League place: 7th
- Owners: James & Dearie Mulvey, Brooklyn Trust Company
- President: Branch Rickey
- Managers: Leo Durocher
- Radio: WHN; Red Barber, Connie Desmond

The 1944 Brooklyn Dodgers saw a constant roster turnover as players left for service in World War II. The team finished the season in seventh place in the National League.

== Regular season ==
=== Season standings ===
National League
Team	W	L	Pct.	GB	Home	Road
St. Louis Cardinals	105	49	.682	—	54‍–‍22	51‍–‍27
Pittsburgh Pirates	90	63	.588	14½	49‍–‍28	41‍–‍35
Cincinnati Reds	89	65	.578	16	45‍–‍33	44‍–‍32
Chicago Cubs	75	79	.487	30	35‍–‍42	40‍–‍37
New York Giants	67	87	.435	38	39‍–‍36	28‍–‍51
Boston Braves	65	89	.422	40	38‍–‍40	27‍–‍49
Brooklyn Dodgers	63	91	.409	42	37‍–‍39	26‍–‍52
Philadelphia Phillies	61	92	.399	43½	29‍–‍49	32‍–‍43

=== Record vs. opponents ===
1944 National League record Sources:
Team	BSN	BRO	CHC	CIN	NYG	PHI	PIT	STL
Boston	—	9–13	11–11	8–14	9–13	11–11–1	9–13	8–14
Brooklyn	13–9	—	8–14–1	8–14	10–12	16–6	4–18	4–18
Chicago	11–11	14–8–1	—	9–13–1	10–12	13–9	12–10–1	6–16
Cincinnati	14–8	14–8	13–9–1	—	15–7	13–19	12–10	8–14
New York	13–9	12–10	12–10	7–15	—	10–12	7–15–1	6–16
Philadelphia	11–11–1	6–16	9–13	9–13	12–10	—	9–12	5–17
Pittsburgh	13–9	18–4	10–12–1	10–12	15–7–1	12–9	—	12–10–3
St. Louis	14–8	18–4	16–6	14–8	16–6	17–5	10–12–3	—

=== Notable transactions ===
- June 6, 1944: Bob Chipman was traded by the Dodgers to the Chicago Cubs for Eddie Stanky.
- August 12, 1944: Frank Drews was traded by the Dodgers to the Boston Braves for Mike Sandlock and cash.

=== Roster ===
1944 Brooklyn Dodgers
Roster
Pitchers: 13 Ralph Branca; 5 Ben Chapman; 12 Bob Chipman; 27 Claude Crocker; 26 Curt Davis; 25 Wes Flowers; -- Jack Franklin; 19 Charlie Fuchs; 3 Art Herring; 18 Clyde King; 22 Bill Lohrman; 28 Hal Gregg; 19 Ed Head; 14 Rube Melton; 34 Cal McLish; 20 Charlie Osgood; 27 Fritz Ostermueller; 19 Tom Sunkel; 13,20 Tommy Warren; 31 Les Webber; -- John Wells; -- Frank Wurm; 17 Whit Wyatt; 38 Albert Zachary	Catchers: 15 Stan Andrews; 32 Fats Dantonio; 32 Ray Hayworth; 34 Roy Jarvis; 10 Mickey Owen; Infielders: 16 Pat Ankenman; 3 Eddie Basinski; 6 Jack Bolling; 33 Frenchy Bordagaray; 15 Bobby Bragan; 3 Tommy Brown; 4 Gil English; 6 Bill Hart; 16 Barney Koch; 3 Gene Mauch; 16 Eddie Miksis; -- Lou Rochelli; 8 Howie Schultz; 12 Eddie Stanky	Outfielders: 19 Morrie Aderholt; 18 Johnny Cooney; -- Red Durrett; 24 Augie Galan; 21 Luis Olmo; 35 Goody Rosen; 11 Dixie Walker; 9 Lloyd Waner; 1 Paul Waner; Other batters: 5 Clancy Smyres	Manager: 2 Leo Durocher; Coaches: 30 Red Corriden; 7 Charlie Dressen

== Player stats ==
= Indicates team leader

= Indicates league leader

=== Batting ===
==== Starters by position ====
Note: Pos = Position; G = Games played; AB = At bats; H = Hits; Avg. = Batting average; HR = Home runs; RBI = Runs batted in

Pos	Player	G	AB	H	Avg.	HR	RBI
C	Mickey Owen	130	461	126	.273	1	42
1B	Howie Schultz	138	526	134	.255	11	83
2B	Eddie Stanky	89	261	72	.276	0	16
3B	Frenchy Bordagaray	130	501	141	.281	6	51
SS	Bobby Bragan	94	266	71	.267	0	17
OF	Augie Galan	151	547	174	.318	12	93
OF	Dixie Walker	147	535	191	.357	13	91
OF	Goody Rosen	89	264	69	.261	0	23

==== Other batters ====
Note: G = Games played; AB = At bats; H = Hits; Avg. = Batting average; HR = Home runs; RBI = Runs batted in

Player	G	AB	H	Avg.	HR	RBI
Luis Olmo	136	520	134	.258	9	85
Tommy Brown	46	146	24	.164	0	8
Paul Waner	83	136	39	.287	0	16
Jack Bolling	56	131	46	.351	1	25
Eddie Basinski	39	105	27	.257	0	9
Barney Koch	33	96	21	.219	0	1
Eddie Miksis	26	91	20	.220	0	11
Bill Hart	29	90	16	.178	0	4
Gil English	27	79	12	.152	1	7
Morrie Aderholt	17	59	16	.271	0	10
Red Durrett	11	32	5	.156	1	1
Pat Ankenman	13	24	6	.250	0	3
Lou Rochelli	5	17	3	.176	0	2
Gene Mauch	5	15	2	.133	0	2
Lloyd Waner	15	14	4	.286	0	1
Ray Hayworth	7	10	0	.000	0	0
Stan Andrews	4	8	1	.125	0	1
Fats Dantonio	3	7	1	.143	0	0
Johnny Cooney	7	4	3	.750	0	1
Clancy Smyres	2	2	0	.000	0	0
Roy Jarvis	1	1	0	.000	0	0

=== Pitching ===
==== Starting pitchers ====
Note: G = Games pitched; IP = Innings pitched; W = Wins; L = Losses; ERA = Earned run average; SO = Strikeouts

Player	G	IP	W	L	ERA	SO
Hal Gregg	39	197.2	9	16	5.46	92
Curt Davis	31	194.0	10	11	3.34	49
Ben Chapman	11	79.1	5	3	3.40	37
Ed Head	9	63.1	4	3	2.70	17
Whit Wyatt	9	37.2	2	6	7.17	4
Frank Wurm	1	0.1	0	0	108.00	1

==== Other pitchers ====
Note: G = Games pitched; IP = Innings pitched; W = Wins; L = Losses; ERA = Earned run average; SO = Strikeouts

Player	G	IP	W	L	ERA	SO
Rube Melton	37	187.1	9	13	3.46	91
Les Webber	48	140.1	7	8	4.94	42
Cal McLish	23	84.0	3	10	7.82	24
Tommy Warren	22	68.2	1	4	4.98	18
Art Herring	12	55.1	3	4	3.42	19
Clyde King	14	43.2	2	1	3.09	14
Fritz Ostermueller	10	41.2	2	1	3.24	17
Bob Chipman	11	36.1	3	1	4.21	20
Tom Sunkel	12	24.0	1	3	7.50	6
John Wells	4	15.0	0	2	5.40	7
Albert Zachary	4	10.1	0	2	9.58	3

==== Relief pitchers ====
Note: G = Games pitched; W = Wins; L = Losses; SV = Saves; ERA = Earned run average; SO = Strikeouts

Player	G	W	L	SV	ERA	SO
Ralph Branca	21	0	2	1	7.05	16
Wes Flowers	9	1	1	0	7.79	3
Charlie Fuchs	8	1	0	0	5.74	5
Bill Lohrman	3	0	0	0	0.00	1
Claude Crocker	2	0	0	0	10.80	1
Charlie Osgood	1	0	0	0	3.00	0
Jack Franklin	1	0	0	0	13.50	0

== Awards and honors ==
- 1944 Major League Baseball All-Star Game
  - Augie Galan starter
  - Dixie Walker starter
  - Mickey Owen reserve
- TSN Major League All-Star Team
  - Dixie Walker

== Farm system ==
Level	Team	League	Manager
AA	Montreal Royals	International League	Bruno Betzel
AA	St. Paul Saints	American Association	Ray Blades
A1	New Orleans Pelicans	Southern Association	Fresco Thompson
B	Newport News Dodgers	Piedmont League	Jake Pitler
B	Trenton Packers	Interstate League	Joe Bird/Walter Alston
D	Olean Oilers	Pennsylvania–Ontario–New York League	John Fitzpatrick
D	Zanesville Dodgers	Ohio–Indiana League	Jack Knight
