= 1945 Brooklyn Dodgers season =

1945 Brooklyn Dodgers
- League: National League
- Ballpark: Ebbets Field
- City: Brooklyn, New York
- Record: 87–67 (.565)
- League place: 3rd
- Owners: James & Dearie Mulvey, Walter O'Malley, Branch Rickey, John L. Smith
- President: Branch Rickey
- Managers: Leo Durocher
- Radio: WHN; Red Barber, Connie Desmond

As World War II was drawing to a close, the 1945 Brooklyn Dodgers finished 11 games back in third place in the National League race.

== Offseason ==
- February 24, 1945: Carden Gillenwater was purchased from the Dodgers by the Boston Braves.
- March 28, 1945: Whit Wyatt was purchased from the Dodgers by the Philadelphia Phillies.

== Regular season ==
Eddie Stanky led the NL in runs scored with 128 in 1945, when he drew a then-record 148 walks.

=== Season standings ===
National League
Team	W	L	Pct.	GB	Home	Road
Chicago Cubs	98	56	.636	—	49‍–‍26	49‍–‍30
St. Louis Cardinals	95	59	.617	3	48‍–‍29	47‍–‍30
Brooklyn Dodgers	87	67	.565	11	48‍–‍30	39‍–‍37
Pittsburgh Pirates	82	72	.532	16	45‍–‍34	37‍–‍38
New York Giants	78	74	.513	19	47‍–‍30	31‍–‍44
Boston Braves	67	85	.441	30	36‍–‍38	31‍–‍47
Cincinnati Reds	61	93	.396	37	36‍–‍41	25‍–‍52
Philadelphia Phillies	46	108	.299	52	22‍–‍55	24‍–‍53

=== Record vs. opponents ===
1945 National League record Sources:
Team	BSN	BRO	CHC	CIN	NYG	PHI	PIT	STL
Boston	—	9–13–1	7–15	10–12	10–10–2	14–8	7–15	10–12
Brooklyn	13–9–1	—	8–14–1	11–11	15–7	19–3	12–10	9–13
Chicago	15–7	14–8–1	—	21–1	11–11	17–5	14–8	6–16
Cincinnati	12–10	11–11	1–21	—	6–16	12–10	10–12	9–13
New York	10–10–2	7–15	11–11	16–6	—	17–5	11–11	6–16
Philadelphia	8–14	3–19	5–17	10–12	5–17	—	6–16	9–13
Pittsburgh	15–7	10–12	8–14	12–10	11–11	16–6	—	10–12–1
St. Louis	12–10	13–9	16–6	13–9	16–6	13–9	12–10–1	—

=== Opening Day lineup ===
Opening Day lineup
Name	Position
Frenchy Bordagaray	Left fielder
Luis Olmo	Center fielder
Augie Galan	First baseman
Dixie Walker	Right fielder
Bill Hart	Third baseman
Mickey Owen	Catcher
Mike Sandlock	Shortstop
Leo Durocher	Second baseman
Curt Davis	Starting pitcher

=== Notable transactions ===
- June 15, 1945: Ben Chapman was traded by the Dodgers to the Philadelphia Phillies for Johnny Peacock.

=== Roster ===
1945 Brooklyn Dodgers
Roster
Pitchers: 13 Ralph Branca; 23 Cy Buker; -- Claude Crocker; 26 Curt Davis; 28 Hal Gregg; 22 Ray Hathaway; 16 Art Herring; 29 Clyde King; 18 Vic Lombardi; 25 Otho Nitcholas; 14 Lee Pfund; 10 Ernie Rudolph; 17 Tom Seats; 31,32 Les Webber	Catchers: 15 Stan Andrews; 3,34 Fats Dantonio; 32 Ray Hayworth; 10 Mickey Owen; 5 Johnny Peacock; 1 Mike Sandlock; 15 Clyde Sukeforth; Infielders: 27,31 Eddie Basinski; 33 Frenchy Bordagaray; 9 Tommy Brown; 8 Claude Corbitt; 13 John Douglas; 2 Leo Durocher; 24 Augie Galan; 6 Bill Hart; 8 Howie Schultz; 12 Eddie Stanky; 6 Ed Stevens; 9 Barney White	Outfielders: 19 Morrie Aderholt; 3 Red Durrett; 3,4,32 Babe Herman; 25 Don Lund; 21 Luis Olmo; 9 Erv Palica; 35 Goody Rosen; 11 Dixie Walker	Manager: 2 Leo Durocher; Coaches: 30 Red Corriden; 7 Charlie Dressen; 32 Ray Hayworth; 15 Clyde Sukeforth

== Player stats ==
=== Batting ===
==== Starters by position ====
Note: Pos = Position; G = Games played; AB = At bats; H = Hits; Avg. = Batting average; HR = Home runs; RBI = Runs batted in

Pos	Player	G	AB	H	Avg.	HR	RBI
C	Mike Sandlock	80	195	55	.282	2	17
1B	Augie Galan	152	576	177	.307	9	92
2B	Eddie Stanky	153	555	143	.258	1	39
3B	Frenchy Bordagaray	113	273	70	.256	2	49
SS	Eddie Basinski	108	336	88	.262	0	33
OF	Dixie Walker	154	607	182	.300	8	124
OF	Goody Rosen	145	606	197	.325	12	75
OF	Luis Olmo	141	556	174	.313	10	110

==== Other batters ====
Note: G = Games played; AB = At bats; H = Hits; Avg. = Batting average; HR = Home runs; RBI = Runs batted in

Player	G	AB	H	Avg.	HR	RBI
Ed Stevens	55	201	55	.274	4	29
Tommy Brown	57	196	48	.245	2	19
Bill Hart	58	161	37	.230	3	27
Howie Schultz	39	142	34	.239	1	19
Fats Dantonio	47	128	32	.250	0	12
Johnny Peacock	48	110	28	.255	0	14
Mickey Owen	24	84	24	.286	0	11
Morrie Aderholt	39	60	13	.217	0	6
Clyde Sukeforth	18	51	15	.294	0	1
Stan Andrews	21	49	8	.163	0	2
Babe Herman	37	34	9	.265	1	9
Red Durrett	8	16	2	.125	0	0
John Douglas	5	9	0	.000	0	0
Leo Durocher	2	5	1	.200	0	2
Claude Corbitt	2	4	2	.500	0	0
Don Lund	4	3	0	.000	0	0
Ray Hayworth	2	2	0	.000	0	0
Barney White	4	1	0	.000	0	0
Erv Palica	2	0	0	----	0	0

=== Pitching ===
==== Starting pitchers ====
Note: G = Games pitched; IP = Innings pitched; W = Wins; L = Losses; ERA = Earned run average; SO = Strikeouts

Player	G	IP	W	L	ERA	SO
Hal Gregg	42	254.1	18	13	3.47	139
Curt Davis	24	149.2	10	10	3.25	39
Art Herring	22	124.0	7	4	3.48	34
Ralph Branca	16	109.2	5	6	3.04	69

==== Other pitchers ====
Note: G = Games pitched; IP = Innings pitched; W = Wins; L = Losses; ERA = Earned run average; SO = Strikeouts

Player	G	IP	W	L	ERA	SO
Vic Lombardi	38	203.2	10	11	3.31	64
Tom Seats	31	121.2	10	7	4.36	44
Les Webber	17	75.1	7	3	3.58	30
Lee Pfund	15	62.1	3	2	5.20	27
Ben Chapman	10	53.2	3	3	5.53	23
Ray Hathaway	4	9.0	0	1	4.00	3

==== Relief pitchers ====
Note: G = Games pitched; W = Wins; L = Losses; SV = Saves; ERA = Earned run average; SO = Strikeouts

Player	G	W	L	SV	ERA	SO
Cy Buker	42	7	2	5	3.30	48
Clyde King	42	5	5	3	4.09	29
Otho Nitcholas	7	1	0	0	5.30	4
Ernie Rudolph	7	1	0	0	5.19	3
Claude Crocker	1	0	0	1	0.00	1

== Awards and honors ==
- 1945 Major League Baseball All-Star Game – Unofficial rosters, the game was not played due to the war
  - Hal Gregg starter
  - Goody Rosen reserve
  - Dixie Walker reserve
- TSN Major League All-Star Team
  - Goody Rosen

== Farm system ==
Level	Team	League	Manager
AA	Montreal Royals	International League	Bruno Betzel
AA	St. Paul Saints	American Association	Ray Blades
A1	Mobile Bears	Southern Association	Clay Hopper
B	Newport News Dodgers	Piedmont League	Jake Pitler
B	Trenton Packers	Interstate League	Walter Alston
D	Olean Oilers	Pennsylvania–Ontario–New York League	John Fitzpatrick
D	Zanesville Dodgers	Ohio–Indiana League	Jack Knight; Morris Mikesell; Ray Hayworth; Eric McNair; Clay Bryant

LEAGUE CHAMPIONS: Mobile, Zanesville
