= 1944 Boston Braves season =

1944 Boston Braves
- League: National League
- Ballpark: Braves Field
- City: Boston, Massachusetts
- Record: 65–89 (.422)
- League place: 6th
- Owners: Louis R. Perini
- General managers: J.A. Robert Quinn
- Managers: Bob Coleman
- Radio: WNAC (Tom Hussey)

The 1944 Boston Braves season was the 74th season of the franchise, 69th as a charter member of the National League. The Braves finished in sixth place with a 65–89 (.422) record, 40 games from the pennant-winning St. Louis Cardinals. They attracted 208,691 fans to Braves Field during this wartime season, eighth and last in the NL and 16th of the 16 teams then classified as major league.

On January 21, 1944, the Braves were acquired by "The Three Little Steam Shovels" — all Boston-area heavy construction magnates; Louis R. Perini, 40, became the principal owner, with C. Joseph Maney, 59, and Guido Rugo, 45, as minority investors. The three were investors in the previous ownership group, headed by club president J.A. Robert Quinn, 73, who remained with the team as chief executive, general manager, and a member of its board of directors.

On August 10, 1944, pitcher Red Barrett pitched a complete-game 2-hit shutout against the Cincinnati Reds at Crosley Field, winning 2–0, requiring only 58 pitches and lasting only 1 hour 15 minutes. It was the fewest number of pitches thrown in a 9-inning complete game and was the quickest night game in MLB history.

== Regular season ==
=== Season standings ===
National League
Team	W	L	Pct.	GB	Home	Road
St. Louis Cardinals	105	49	.682	—	54‍–‍22	51‍–‍27
Pittsburgh Pirates	90	63	.588	14½	49‍–‍28	41‍–‍35
Cincinnati Reds	89	65	.578	16	45‍–‍33	44‍–‍32
Chicago Cubs	75	79	.487	30	35‍–‍42	40‍–‍37
New York Giants	67	87	.435	38	39‍–‍36	28‍–‍51
Boston Braves	65	89	.422	40	38‍–‍40	27‍–‍49
Brooklyn Dodgers	63	91	.409	42	37‍–‍39	26‍–‍52
Philadelphia Phillies	61	92	.399	43½	29‍–‍49	32‍–‍43

=== Record vs. opponents ===
1944 National League record Sources:
Team	BSN	BRO	CHC	CIN	NYG	PHI	PIT	STL
Boston	—	9–13	11–11	8–14	9–13	11–11–1	9–13	8–14
Brooklyn	13–9	—	8–14–1	8–14	10–12	16–6	4–18	4–18
Chicago	11–11	14–8–1	—	9–13–1	10–12	13–9	12–10–1	6–16
Cincinnati	14–8	14–8	13–9–1	—	15–7	13–19	12–10	8–14
New York	13–9	12–10	12–10	7–15	—	10–12	7–15–1	6–16
Philadelphia	11–11–1	6–16	9–13	9–13	12–10	—	9–12	5–17
Pittsburgh	13–9	18–4	10–12–1	10–12	15–7–1	12–9	—	12–10–3
St. Louis	14–8	18–4	16–6	14–8	16–6	17–5	10–12–3	—

=== Roster ===
1944 Boston Braves
Roster
Pitchers: 25 Nate Andrews; 19 Red Barrett; 20 Ben Cardoni; 17 Jim Hickey; 17 Johnny Hutchings; 30 Ira Hutchinson; 18 Al Javery; 34 Stan Klopp; 21 Carl Lindquist; 26 Harry MacPherson; 28 Woody Rich; 22 Jim Tobin; 35 George Woodend	Catchers: 10 Stew Hofferth; 11 Clyde Kluttz; 10 Phil Masi; 14 Hugh Poland; Infielders: 21 Pat Capri; 6 Dick Culler; 34 Frank Drews; 3 Buck Etchison; 8 Ben Geraghty; 27 Roland Gladu; 15 Warren Huston; 9 Max Macon; 2,5 Dee Phillips; 8 Connie Ryan; 8 Mike Sandlock; 14,21 Steve Shemo; 7 Whitey Wietelmann	Outfielders: 15 Chet Clemens; 1 Tommy Holmes; 16 Butch Nieman; 28 Chet Ross; 4 Chuck Workman; 5 Ab Wright; Other batters: 12 Gene Patton	Manager: 31 Bob Coleman; Coaches: 32 Benny Bengough; 33 Tom Sheehan

== Player stats ==
= Indicates team leader

=== Batting ===
==== Starters by position ====
Note: Pos = Position; G = Games played; AB = At bats; H = Hits; Avg. = Batting average; HR = Home runs; RBI = Runs batted in

Pos	Player	G	AB	H	Avg.	HR	RBI
C	Clyde Kluttz	81	229	64	.279	2	19
1B	Buck Etchison	109	308	66	.214	8	33
2B	Connie Ryan	88	332	98	.295	4	25
SS	Whitey Wietelmann	125	417	100	.240	2	32
3B	Dee Phillips	140	489	126	.258	1	53
OF	Chuck Workman	140	418	87	.208	11	53
OF	Tommy Holmes	155	631	195	.309	13	73
OF	Butch Nieman	134	468	124	.265	16	65

==== Other batters ====
Note: G = Games played; AB = At bats; H = Hits; Avg. = Batting average; HR = Home runs; RBI = Runs batted in

Player	G	AB	H	Avg.	HR	RBI
Max Macon	106	366	100	.273	3	36
Phil Masi	89	251	69	.275	3	23
Ab Wright	71	195	50	.256	7	35
Stew Hofferth	66	180	36	.200	1	26
Chet Ross	54	154	35	.227	5	26
Frank Drews	46	141	29	.206	0	10
Roland Gladu	21	66	16	.242	1	7
Warren Huston	33	55	11	.200	0	1
Steve Shemo	18	31	9	.290	0	1
Mike Sandlock	30	30	3	.100	0	2
Dick Culler	8	28	2	.071	0	0
Hugh Poland	8	23	3	.130	0	2
Chet Clemens	19	17	3	.176	0	2
Ben Geraghty	11	16	4	.250	0	0
Pat Capri	7	1	0	.000	0	0
Gene Patton	1	0	0	----	0	0

=== Pitching ===
==== Starting pitchers ====
Note: G = Games pitched; IP = Innings pitched; W = Wins; L = Losses; ERA = Earned run average; SO = Strikeouts

Player	G	IP	W	L	ERA	SO
Jim Tobin	43	299.1	18	19	3.01	83
Nate Andrews	37	257.1	16	15	3.22	76
Al Javery	40	254.0	10	19	3.54	137
Red Barrett	42	230.1	9	16	4.06	54

==== Other pitchers ====
Note: G = Games pitched; IP = Innings pitched; W = Wins; L = Losses; ERA = Earned run average; SO = Strikeouts

Player	G	IP	W	L	ERA	SO
Ira Hutchinson	40	119.2	9	7	4.21	22
Ben Cardoni	22	75.2	0	6	3.93	24
Johnny Hutchings	14	56.2	9	7	4.21	22
Woody Rich	7	25.0	1	1	5.76	6

==== Relief pitchers ====
Note: G = Games pitched; W = Wins; L = Losses; SV = Saves; ERA = Earned run average; SO = Strikeouts

Player	G	W	L	SV	ERA	SO
Stan Klopp	24	1	2	0	4.27	17
Jim Hickey	8	0	0	0	4.82	3
Carl Lindquist	5	0	0	0	3.12	4
George Woodend	3	0	0	0	13.50	0
Max Macon	1	0	0	0	21.00	1
Harry MacPherson	1	0	0	0	0.00	1

== Farm system ==
Level	Team	League	Manager
A	Hartford Laurels	Eastern League	Del Bissonette
