= Van Lingle Mungo (song) =

Song by Dave Frishberg

from the album Oklahoma Toad
- Released: 1969
- Label: CTI
- Songwriter: Dave Frishberg

"Van Lingle Mungo" is a song composed and performed by jazz pianist Dave Frishberg. Frishberg wrote both the lyrics and the music. The song, released in 1969, was distributed by Red Day Division of Doramus, Inc. under CTI Records. It was originally released as a single, but was later incorporated into Oklahoma Toad, Frishberg's 1970 LP.

== Development ==
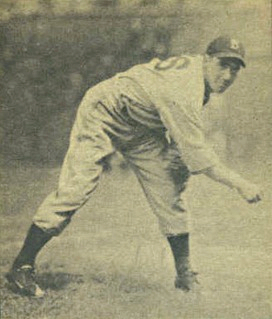
Van Lingle Mungo in 1940

Frishberg developed the melody first, but couldn't settle on lyrics, rejecting several sets of lyrics he drafted. Frishberg browsed through a copy of a baseball encyclopedia, which lists the names of players in Major League Baseball. In the encyclopedia, he found the name of Van Lingle Mungo, a name he found unusual. He later found himself humming Mungo's name to the melody.

From there, Frishberg found more names in the encyclopedia that he found interesting. He proceeded to write song lyrics for the melody that included only the names of major league players and the words "and" and "big", attempting to order the names in a rhyming fashion. The song is performed in bossa nova style.

The players mentioned in most versions of the song, in addition to Mungo, are:

- John Antonelli
- Eddie Basinski
- Augie Bergamo
- Frenchy Bordagaray
- Lou Boudreau
- Harry Brecheen
- Roy Campanella
- Phil Cavarretta
- Frankie Crosetti
- Bobby Estalella
- Ferris Fain
- Augie Galan
- Danny Gardella
- Johnny Gee
- Frankie Gustine
- Stan Hack
- Sig Jakucki
- Eddie Joost
- Whitey Kurowski
- Max Lanier
- Thornton Lee
- Ernie Lombardi
- "Heeney" Hank Majeski
- Pinky May
- Barney McCosky
- George McQuinn
- Johnny Mize
- Hugh Mulcahy
- Claude Passeau
- Art Passarella
- Johnny Pesky
- Howard Pollet
- Johnny Sain
- Hal Trosky
- Johnny Vander Meer
- Eddie Waitkus
- Early Wynn

The list of names is a mixture of well-known players and more obscure ones, all of whom played in the majors during the 1940s (and many of whom also played in parts of the 30s and/or 50s). Boudreau, Campanella, Lombardi, Mize, and Wynn are all in the Hall Of Fame, and several others also had very long and successful careers. Among the more obscure players are Bergamo (who played in only two seasons, the fewest of any of the players mentioned), and Gee (who appeared in parts of six seasons, but played in only 44 games, the fewest of any of the players mentioned.)

In the original recording there is one name, Art Passarella, who was an umpire rather than a player. In later recordings, the name of Roy Campanella is substituted in for Passarella. In the later Retromania: At The Jazz Bakery album, Frishberg changed it back to Passarella. On an early recording that coincided with the release of the Oklahoma Toad album, Frishberg replaces the mellifluous Lou Boudreau and Claude Passeau with Virgil Trucks and Johnny Kucks. With the death of John Antonelli (usually listed as "Johnny") on February 28, 2020, Eddie Basinski became the last surviving player mentioned in the song. Basinski died on January 8, 2022.

== Reception ==
Jazz critic and author Ira Gitler considers "Van Lingle Mungo" as "one of the best jazz works of the 70s and certainly the best ever done combining jazz and baseball." The song has been entered in the National Baseball Library, a section of the National Baseball Hall of Fame and Museum in Cooperstown, New York. "Van Lingle Mungo" was included in Baseball's Greatest Hits, a 1990 compilation of baseball-themed songs.

Mungo and his wife reported that they both enjoyed the song.
