= Zach Lee =

American baseball player (born 1991)

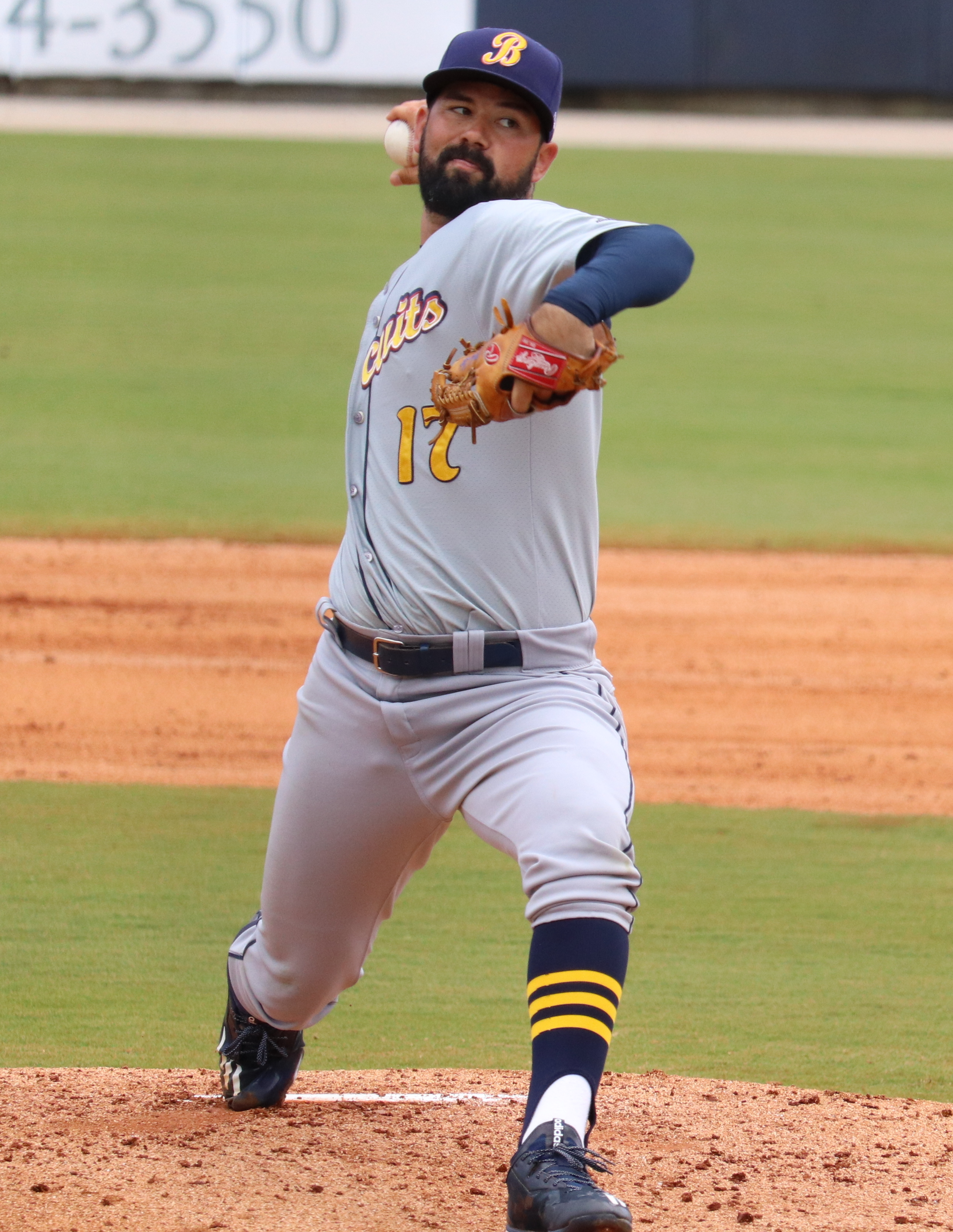
- Lee with the Montgomery Biscuits in 2018
- Pitcher
- Born: September 13, 1991 (age 34); McKinney, Texas, U.S.
- Batted: Right Threw: Right

MLB debut
- July 25, 2015, for the Los Angeles Dodgers

Last MLB appearance
- April 18, 2017, for the San Diego Padres

MLB statistics
- Win–loss record: 1–1
- Earned run average: 8.53
- Strikeouts: 9
- Stats at Baseball Reference

Teams
- Los Angeles Dodgers (2015); San Diego Padres (2017)

Zachary Stephen Lee (born September 13, 1991) is an American former professional baseball pitcher. The Los Angeles Dodgers drafted him in the first round (28th overall) of the 2010 MLB draft and signed him for $5.25 million. He made his Major League Baseball (MLB) debut for the Dodgers in 2015 and also played for the San Diego Padres in 2017.

== Early life ==
As a senior at McKinney High School (Texas) in 2010, he won 11 games with a 2.15 ERA and 90 strikeouts. He was a highly rated quarterback in high school, passing for 2,565 yards and 31 touchdowns as a senior to earn a Texas All-State Class 4A honorable mention selection and First-Team All-District 9-4A. The previous year, Lee passed for 2,935 yards and 33 touchdowns and was named District 9-4A Offensive Player of the Year as a junior.

== Professional career ==
=== Los Angeles Dodgers ===
Lee had committed to playing baseball and football at Louisiana State University and enrolled in summer school. He was considered a tough signing due to his football commitment and reportedly dropped in the draft as a result. After being drafted in the first round (28th overall) of the 2010 MLB June Amateur Draft, he did sign with the Dodgers, for $5.25 million, a franchise-record signing bonus. After he signed, Baseball America listed Lee as the Dodgers second-best prospect.

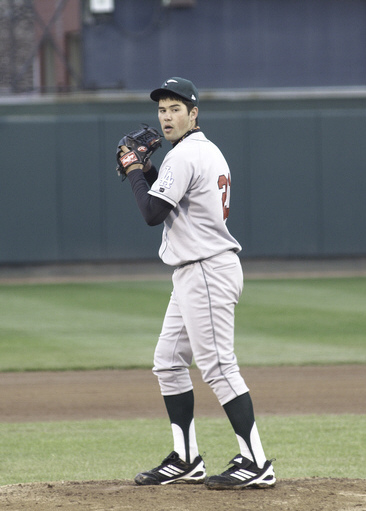
Lee pitching for the Great Lakes Loons in 2011

Lee made his debut in the Dodgers organization for the Great Lakes Loons in the Single–A Midwest League in 2011. On April 8, he faced the Lake County Captains, throwing four innings with five strikeouts and three walks. He made 24 total starts for the Loons, finishing with a 9–6 record and 3.47 ERA. Lee's 2011 performance led Baseball America to list him as the best prospect in the Dodgers farm system. He was promoted to the High-A Rancho Cucamonga Quakes to start 2012. He was 2–3 with a 4.55 ERA for the Quakes in 12 starts and was promoted to the Chattanooga Lookouts on June 25, 2012. Lee's debut at the Double–A level came against the Mississippi Braves on the next day. He pitched six innings, yielding only one run, but earned a no decision. His start with the Lookouts was slow, but Lee improved as the season went on thanks to mechanical adjustments in his pitching delivery. He finished 4–3 with a 4.25 ERA for the Lookouts. Following the season, Lee fell to fifth on Baseball America's list of Dodgers prospects.

In 2013, Lee was selected to the mid-season Southern League All-Star Game and finished the season 10–10 with a 3.22 ERA and 131 strikeouts in 28 games. Lee was named the Dodgers minor league pitcher of the year for 2013 and ranked fourth on the Dodgers prospect list compiled by Baseball America.

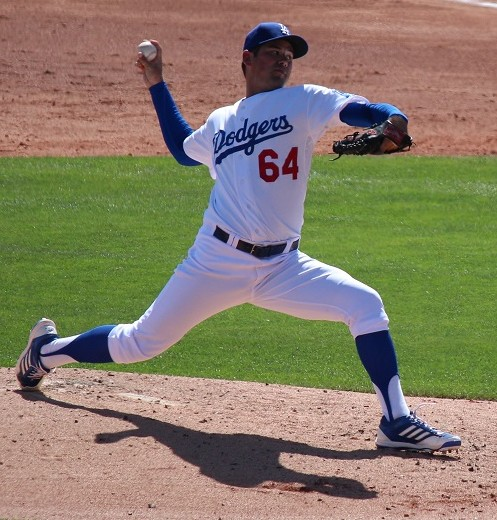
Lee with the Dodgers in spring training in 2014

Lee was invited to spring training in 2014, but started the season with the Albuquerque Isotopes. Lee's Triple–A debut came against the Tacoma Rainiers on April 6, 2015. He made 27 starts for the Isotopes and had a record of 7–13 with a 5.44 ERA.

On November 20, 2014, the Dodgers added Lee to their 40-man roster in order to protect him from the Rule 5 Draft. Lee was assigned to the Dodgers new Triple–A team, the Oklahoma City Dodgers, to start 2015. He got off to a strong start in 2015 in Triple–A and put himself back on the map for the Dodgers prospects. However, he was shut down at the beginning of June as a result of experiencing tingling in his fingers. The problem was diagnosed as irritation due to poor circulation and he was put back on a throwing program. Prior to his major league debut, Lee had compiled a record of 7–3 and an ERA of 2.36 with Oklahoma City.

Lee was called up to the majors for the first time on July 18, 2015, to serve as the emergency 26th man for the second game of a doubleheader against the Washington Nationals, though he did not appear in the game. The Dodgers promoted him again on July 25 to make his debut as the starting pitcher against the New York Mets. He struggled in his debut, allowing four runs to score in the first inning and seven total in the 4 2/3 innings he pitched. He was the first Dodgers starting pitcher to allow seven runs in his debut since Johnny Babich in 1934 and the first to allow four runs or more in the first inning of his debut since Frank Wurm in 1944. Lee was optioned back to Triple–A soon afterwards. In 19 starts for Oklahoma City, he was 11–6 with a 2.70 ERA. He was named the organization's minor league pitcher of the year for a second time.

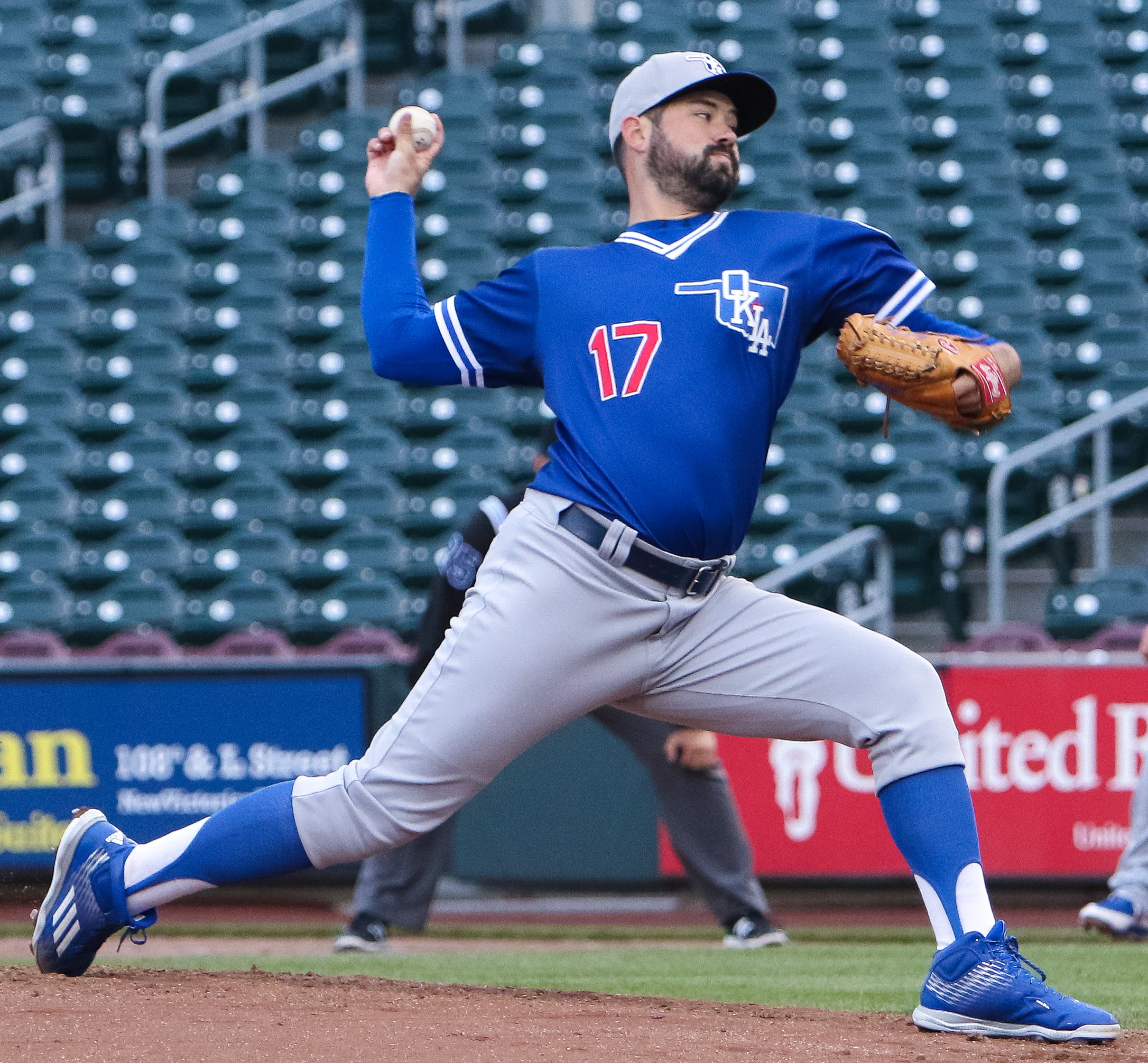
Lee pitching for the Oklahoma City Dodgers in 2016

The Dodgers invited Lee to spring training again in 2016. He contended for the fifth starter spot on the major league club during spring training but was beat out by Ross Stripling and optioned back to Triple–A. In 13 starts, he was 7–5 with a 4.89 ERA for Oklahoma City. He also spent three days on the major league roster in April but never appeared in a game.

=== Seattle Mariners ===
On June 19, 2016, Lee was traded to the Seattle Mariners in exchange for Chris Taylor. In 14 starts for the Triple–A Tacoma Rainiers he was 0–9 with a 7.74 ERA, while Taylor blossomed into a prolific hitter for the Dodgers. Mariners general manager Jerry Dipoto, a prolific trader, has referred to this as one he wishes he could take back and that he "whiffed" on it.

=== San Diego Padres ===
On December 13, 2016, Lee was claimed off waivers by the San Diego Padres. He recorded his first major league victory on April 12 against the Colorado Rockies. He was designated for assignment on June 19, and was released from the Padres organization on August 14, 2017.

=== Tampa Bay Rays ===
On March 16, 2018, Lee signed a minor-league contract with the Tampa Bay Rays organization. Lee led the Southern League with a 2.22 ERA with 64 innings pitched and was named to the Mid season All-Star team (he did not play). He made 26 total appearances (25 starts) split between the Triple–A Durham Bulls and Double–A Montgomery Biscuits, accumulating a 12–6 record and 3.65 ERA with 107 strikeouts across 145 2/3 innings pitched. Lee elected free agency following the season on November 2.

=== New York Mets ===
On December 18, 2018, Lee signed a minor league deal with the New York Mets. On June 13, 2019, he was placed on the injured list. Prior to his injury, Lee had struggled for the Triple–A Syracuse Mets and Double–A Binghamton Rumble Ponies, sporting a 6.75 ERA in 11 starts in 13 appearances, including a 7.19 ERA in last 10 appearances before hitting the IL. He elected free agency following the season on November 4.

=== Oakland Athletics ===
On November 25, 2019, Lee signed a minor league contract with the Oakland Athletics that included an invitation to spring training. He did not play in a game in 2020 due to the cancellation of the minor league season because of the COVID-19 pandemic. Lee became a free agent on November 2, 2020.

=== Arizona Diamondbacks ===
On February 6, 2021, Lee signed a minor league contract with the Arizona Diamondbacks organization. In 17 appearances for the Triple–A Reno Aces, Lee recorded a 6.86 ERA with 44 strikeouts. On August 10, Lee was released by the Diamondbacks.

=== Cincinnati Reds ===
On September 1, 2021, Lee signed a minor league deal with the Cincinnati Reds. Lee made 7 appearances for the Triple-A Louisville Bats, going 1–0 with a 4.26 ERA and 17 strikeouts. He became a free agent following the season.

=== Colorado Rockies ===
On February 12, 2022, Lee signed a minor league contract with the Colorado Rockies. In 64 games out of the bullpen, he registered a 4–6 record and 5.14 ERA with 62 strikeouts and 12 saves across 61 1/3 innings pitched. Lee elected free agency following the season on November 10.
