= Eddie Robinson (baseball) =

American baseball player (1920–2021)

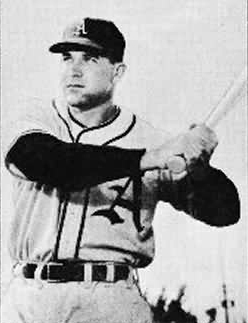
- Robinson with the Philadelphia Athletics in 1953
- First baseman
- Born: December 15, 1920; Paris, Texas, U.S.
- Died: October 4, 2021 (aged 100); Bastrop, Texas, U.S.
- Batted: Left Threw: Right

MLB debut
- September 9, 1942, for the Cleveland Indians

Last MLB appearance
- September 15, 1957, for the Baltimore Orioles

MLB statistics
- Batting average: .268
- Home runs: 172
- Runs batted in: 723
- Stats at Baseball Reference

Teams
- Cleveland Indians (1942, 1946–1948); Washington Senators (1949–1950); Chicago White Sox (1950–1952); Philadelphia Athletics (1953); New York Yankees (1954–1956); Kansas City Athletics (1956); Detroit Tigers (1957); Cleveland Indians (1957); Baltimore Orioles (1957)

Career highlights and awards
- 4× All-Star (1949, 1951–1953); World Series champion (1948)

William Edward Robinson (December 15, 1920 – October 4, 2021) was an American professional baseball first baseman, scout, coach, and front office executive who was notable for playing, during a 13-year playing career (1942; 1946–57), on the rosters of seven of the eight American League teams then in existence (with the Boston Red Sox as the sole exception). He was the author of an autobiography, published in 2011, titled Lucky Me: My Sixty-five Years in Baseball.

Robinson was the last surviving member of the 1943 "Navy World Series", the last surviving member of a World Series-winning Cleveland Indians team, and the last surviving major leaguer to have played at League Park in Cleveland, which the Indians abandoned after the 1946 season. At the time of his death, he was the oldest living player from a World Series-winning team and the oldest living member of the Baltimore Orioles, Cleveland Indians, Chicago White Sox, Detroit Tigers, New York Yankees, Philadelphia / Kansas City Athletics, and Washington Senators. Following the death of Val Heim on November 21, 2019, Robinson became the oldest living former player. Robinson was also the last living player from the 1942 season, as well as the oldest living player whose major league career was interrupted by World War II service.

== Early life ==
Eddie Robinson was born and grew up in the Northeastern Texas town of Paris. He was the only child of William Edward Robinson, an automobile electrician born in Missouri, and Hazel Robinson, born in Tennessee. Eddie's father later left the family, and his parents divorced when Eddie was 12. He attended Paris Junior College.

== Career ==
Eddie Robinson, a left-handed batter who threw right-handed, played four seasons in the minor leagues before being briefly called up at the end of the 1942 season by the Cleveland Indians. He enlisted in the U.S. Navy after the 1942 season and did not resume his baseball career until 1946. Robinson suffered a leg injury while in the service, and never fully recovered fully due to a botched operation, but did recover sufficiently to enjoy a thirteen-season major league career. He enjoyed his most prominent team moment when, at the age of 27, he contributed to his first team, the Cleveland Indians, winning the 1948 World Series. Although traded during that offseason, he was still at the top of his game and with his next two teams, Washington Senators (1949–50) and Chicago White Sox (1950–52), experienced the most productive seasons of his time in the majors. In 1951 Robinson began his life-long relationship with Paul Richards when former player Richards started his major league career as a manager with the Chicago White Sox.

Overall, Robinson appeared in 1,315 games and batted .268 with 172 home runs, and 723 runs batted in. Defensively, he finished his career with a .990 fielding percentage, playing every inning at first base. He did not play in the 1943 through 1945 seasons, due to his service in the U.S. Navy during World War II. After the 1948 season, Robinson, Ed Klieman, and Joe Haynes were sent to the Senators in exchange for Mickey Vernon and Early Wynn.

A four-time All-Star, Robinson was the American League's starting first baseman for the midsummer classics of 1949 and 1952. The first game was a slugfest, 11–7, won by the American League, with a Robinson first-inning single off National league starter Warren Spahn driving in Joe DiMaggio. In the 1952 game, a rain-shortened 3-2 National League victory, Robinson singled in the American League's first run, scoring Minnie Miñoso, who had led off the fourth inning with a double.

On April 25, 1951, Robinson became one of the few players to hit a home run out of old Comiskey Park.

In 1955, while playing for the New York Yankees as a part-time player, Robinson hit 16 home runs while having only 36 hits. He also had more runs batted in than hits, knocking in 42 runs. For the season he hit only .208 in 173 at bats, and had 36 bases-on-balls.

Robinson was the oldest living Major League player who began his career during or after the 1940s, and he was the last living player whose Major League career was interrupted by World War II service. (Chris Haughey never made it back to the majors, and Eddie Basinski and Tommy Brown were civilians throughout the war.)

== Post-playing career ==
Upon retirement, Robinson became a coach for the Baltimore Orioles and then moved into their player development department. A protégé of Orioles manager and fellow Texan Paul Richards, he followed Richards to the Houston Astros, then worked as the farm system director of the Kansas City Athletics during the tempestuous ownership of Charlie Finley in the mid-1960s. In 1968, Robinson rejoined Richards in the front office of the Atlanta Braves. He succeeded Richards as general manager of the Braves during the 1972 season, serving through early 1976 in that post.

Robinson then returned to the American League as a member of the Texas Rangers front office. In 1977, Robinson was named co-general manager (with Dan O'Brien Sr.) of the Rangers, and became sole GM from 1978 to 1982. Although the Rangers posted winning seasons in 1977, 1978, and 1981, a disastrous 1982 campaign cost Robinson his job as general manager.

Continuing in baseball as a scout and player development consultant, he found his last position as a scout for the Boston Red Sox, the only team of the "original eight" American League clubs that he did not play for.

The last living Cleveland Indians player to win a World Series championship (there are no living players who played on an earlier World Series championship team than Robinson's 1948 Indians), Robinson attended Game 6 of the 2016 World Series between the Indians and Chicago Cubs at Progressive Field in Cleveland. Robinson lived in Fort Worth, Texas. After the death of outfielder Val Heim, Robinson was recognized as the oldest living baseball player.

== Personal life ==
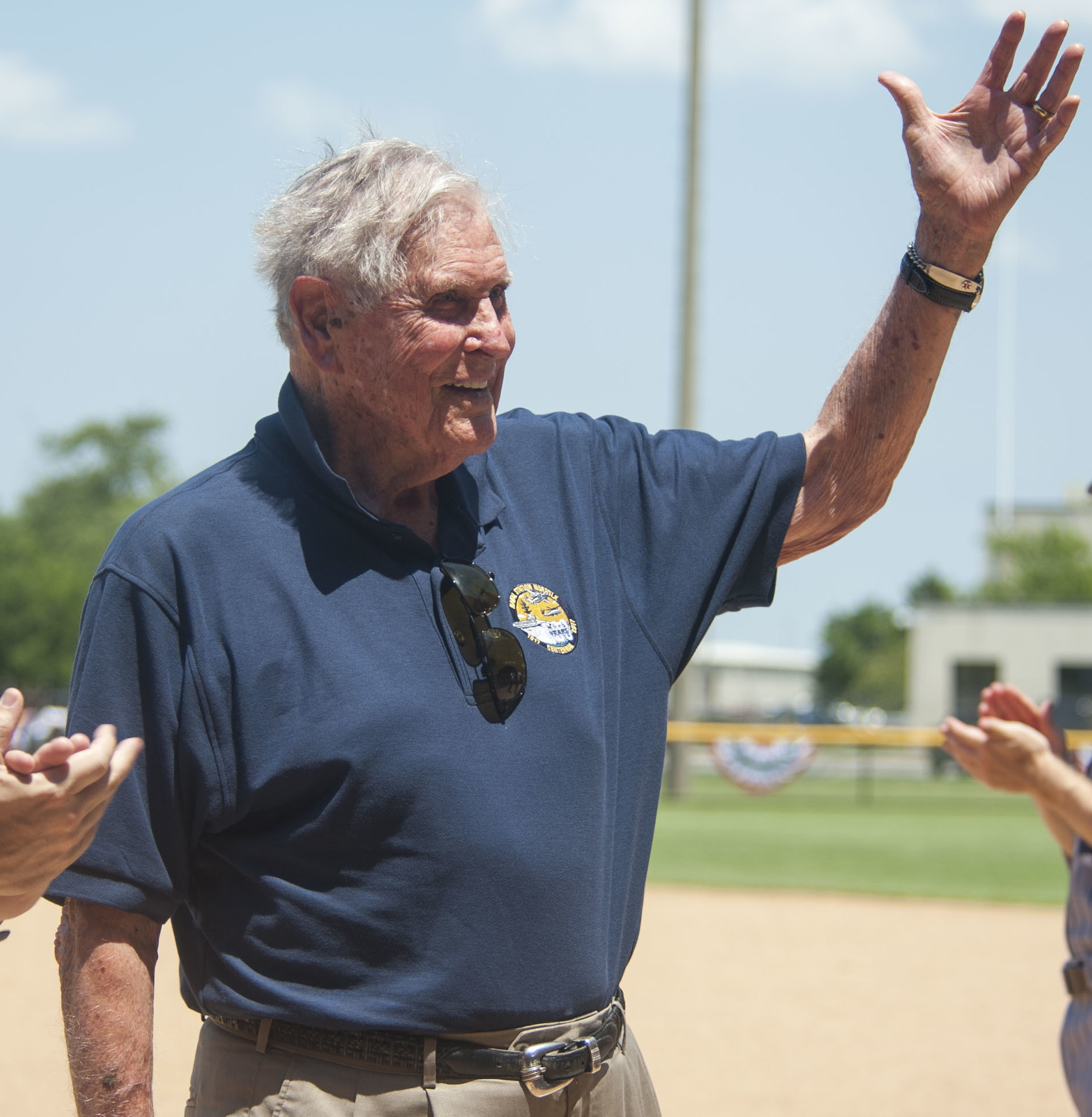
Robinson at a U.S. Navy softball game in 2017

Robinson enlisted in the U.S. Navy after the 1942 season; he served three years. After basic training, he married Elayne Elder in February 1943. They had two children, one of whom died in childhood, and divorced in 1951.

Robinson married the former Bette Farlow, a native of Pittsburgh, Pennsylvania, in 1955. The couple raised three sons — Marc, Drew, and Paul. As of 1993 they had lived in Woodhaven Country Club Estates for 15 years and also grew and sold pecans from a farm near Austin, Texas.

Robinson resided in Fort Worth, Texas, where he and Bette moved in 1984.

On December 15, 2020, Robinson turned 100. He was working on a podcast, "The Golden Age of Baseball", through which he hoped to eventually have donations made to the Alzheimer's Foundation.

== Death ==
Eddie Robinson died on October 4, 2021, in Bastrop, Texas, aged 100.

Records
Preceded by Val Heim	Oldest recognized verified living baseball player November 21, 2019 – October 4, 2021	Succeeded by George Elder
Sporting positions
Preceded by Paul Richards	Atlanta Braves general manager 1972–1976	Succeeded by John Alevizos
Preceded by Dan O'Brien Sr.	Texas Rangers general manager 1978–1982	Succeeded by Joe Klein
