= Eddie Basinski =

American baseball player (1922–2022)

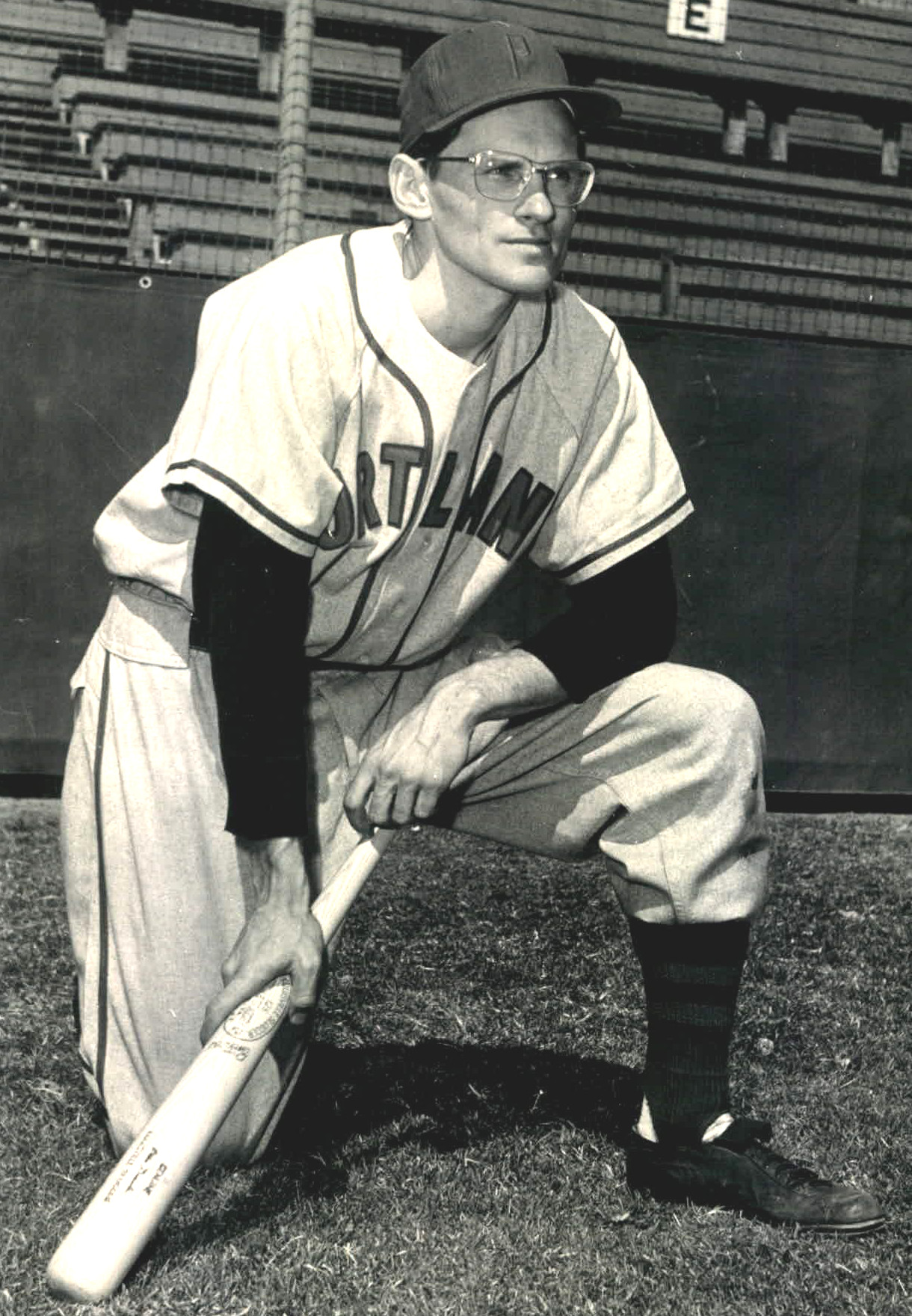
- Shortstop / Second baseman
- Born: November 4, 1922; Buffalo, New York, U.S.
- Died: January 8, 2022 (aged 99); Gladstone, Oregon, U.S.
- Batted: Right Threw: Right

MLB debut
- May 20, 1944, for the Brooklyn Dodgers

Last MLB appearance
- July 4, 1947, for the Pittsburgh Pirates

MLB statistics
- Batting average: .244
- Home runs: 4
- Runs batted in: 59
- Stats at Baseball Reference

Teams
- Brooklyn Dodgers (1944–1945); Pittsburgh Pirates (1947)

Edwin Frank Basinski (November 4, 1922 – January 8, 2022) was an American professional baseball infielder. He played in Major League Baseball for the Brooklyn Dodgers and Pittsburgh Pirates.

== Early life ==
Basinski was born in Buffalo, New York, on November 4, 1922. His father, Walter, a U.S. Navy veteran, was a machinist. He graduated from East High School in Buffalo. Basinski attended the University of Buffalo where he lettered in tennis and cross country (they had no baseball team). In 1943 Basinski earned a degree in mechanical engineering and went to work for the Curtiss-Wright Company in Buffalo.

== Pro baseball ==
The Brooklyn Dodgers scouted him at a 1943 semi-pro game in Buffalo and signed him to a contract that included a $5,000 signing bonus. Listed at 6 ft 1 in (1.85 m), 172 lb (78 kg), Basinski batted and threw right-handed. He made his major league debut on May 20, 1944, on the road against the Cincinnati Reds. Starting at shortstop and batting eighth, he went 1–4, with his first hit a fifth-inning triple off Bob Katz, and later scoring on a single by Frenchy Bordagaray in a 6–1 win. He played in 39 games that year with 120 plate appearances, batting .257 with 4 doubles, a triple and 9 runs batted in.

In 1945 he played in 108 games with 262 plate appearances, batting .262 with 9 doubles and 4 triples. When many players returned from the war in 1945, he was sent to the minor leagues. In December 1946 he was traded to the Pittsburgh Pirates. In 1947 he played in 56 games with 182 plate appearances. He batted .199 but hit the first 4 home runs of his career to go along with 33 runs batted in.

In addition to his major league career, Basinski played with six different minor league clubs between 1944 and 1959, as well as for the Patriotas de Venezuela of the Venezuelan Professional Baseball League during the 1951–1952 season. Basinski is a member of the Pacific Coast League Hall of Fame, as well as the Oregon Sports Hall of Fame in recognition of his lengthy career with the Portland Beavers—over 10 seasons. He was the oldest living former player of the Brooklyn/Los Angeles Dodgers and Pittsburgh Pirates. Following the death of Eddie Robinson in October 2021, he became the second-oldest living major leaguer, behind George Elder.

== Personal life and death ==
Basinski began practicing the violin at an early age and even held a chair with the Buffalo Symphony Orchestra. His mother was a pianist. His nicknames were "The Fiddler", "Bazooka", and "The Professor" (he wore glasses). After retiring from baseball, Basinski remained in the Portland area with his wife and two sons, working for Consolidated Freightways for 31 years as an account manager. He retired in 1991 in Milwaukie, Oregon. In later life, he resided in a care facility in Gladstone, Oregon.

His son, Jeff, was a coach, athletic director and assistant principal during his 29 years with Forest Grove School District in Washington County, Oregon. Jeff died suddenly in 2011, and the Basinski Center gym was named in his honor in 2013. Basinski died at a care facility in Gladstone on January 8, 2022, at the age of 99.

== See also ==
- Van Lingle Mungo (song)
