= Eddie Carnett =

American baseball player (1916–2016)

- Outfielder / First baseman
- Born: October 21, 1916; Springfield, Missouri, U.S.
- Died: November 4, 2016 (aged 100); Ringling, Oklahoma, U.S.
- Batted: Left Threw: Left

MLB debut
- April 19, 1941, for the Boston Braves

Last MLB appearance
- July 7, 1945, for the Cleveland Indians

MLB statistics
- Batting average: .268
- Home runs: 1
- Runs batted in: 67
- Stats at Baseball Reference

Teams
- Boston Braves (1941); Chicago White Sox (1944); Cleveland Indians (1945)

Edwin Elliott Carnett (October 21, 1916 – November 4, 2016) was an American professional baseball player. He played in the major leagues, primarily as an outfielder and first baseman, appearing for three different teams during the 1940s. Listed at 6 ft 0 in (1.83 m) and 185 lb (84 kg), he batted and threw left-handed.

== Baseball career ==
Carnett was noticed by big league scouts when he was pitching in high school. He was signed by the Chicago Cubs in 1935, assigned to the Class C Ponca City Angels of the Western Association in his hometown, Ponca City, Oklahoma, and won 19 games. In 1936, he was in spring training with the Los Angeles Angels, the Cubs' top farm club in the Pacific Coast League, but an accident during a "pepper" game led to a serious shoulder injury that jeopardized his career. He was reassigned back to Ponca City, pitched with the injury and lost ten straight games, took off some time to work on his hitting, and then won 16 consecutive games.

Carnett, nicknamed "Lefty", entered the major leagues in 1941 with the Boston Braves, playing in two games before joining the United States Navy during World War II (1942–43). After he was discharged, he played for the Chicago White Sox in 1944 and the Cleveland Indians in 1945, mostly as an outfielder and first baseman. In his three-season career, Carnett pitched 5 1/3 innings in six appearances, and posted a 3.40 earned run average with four strikeouts, three walks, and no decisions. His career batting statistics included a .268 batting average with 25 doubles, 8 triples, 1 home run, and 67 runs batted in.

After World War II ended, he played for the AAA PCL Seattle Rainiers in 1946 before returning to Class C balls and eventually returned to Ponca City to play for the Jets in 1954 and 1955 prior to their moving to Gainesville, Texas.

== Death ==
Carnett died in November 2016 in Ringling, Oklahoma, two weeks after celebrating his 100th birthday. At the time of his death, he was the oldest living former Major League Baseball player; that distinction then passed to Bobby Doerr, who was born on April 7, 1918.

== See also ==
- List of centenarians (Major League Baseball players)
- List of centenarians (sportspeople)

Records
Preceded by Mike Sandlock	Oldest recognized verified living baseball player April 4, 2016 – November 4, 2016	Succeeded by Bobby Doerr
