= Art Schallock =

American baseball player (1924–2025)

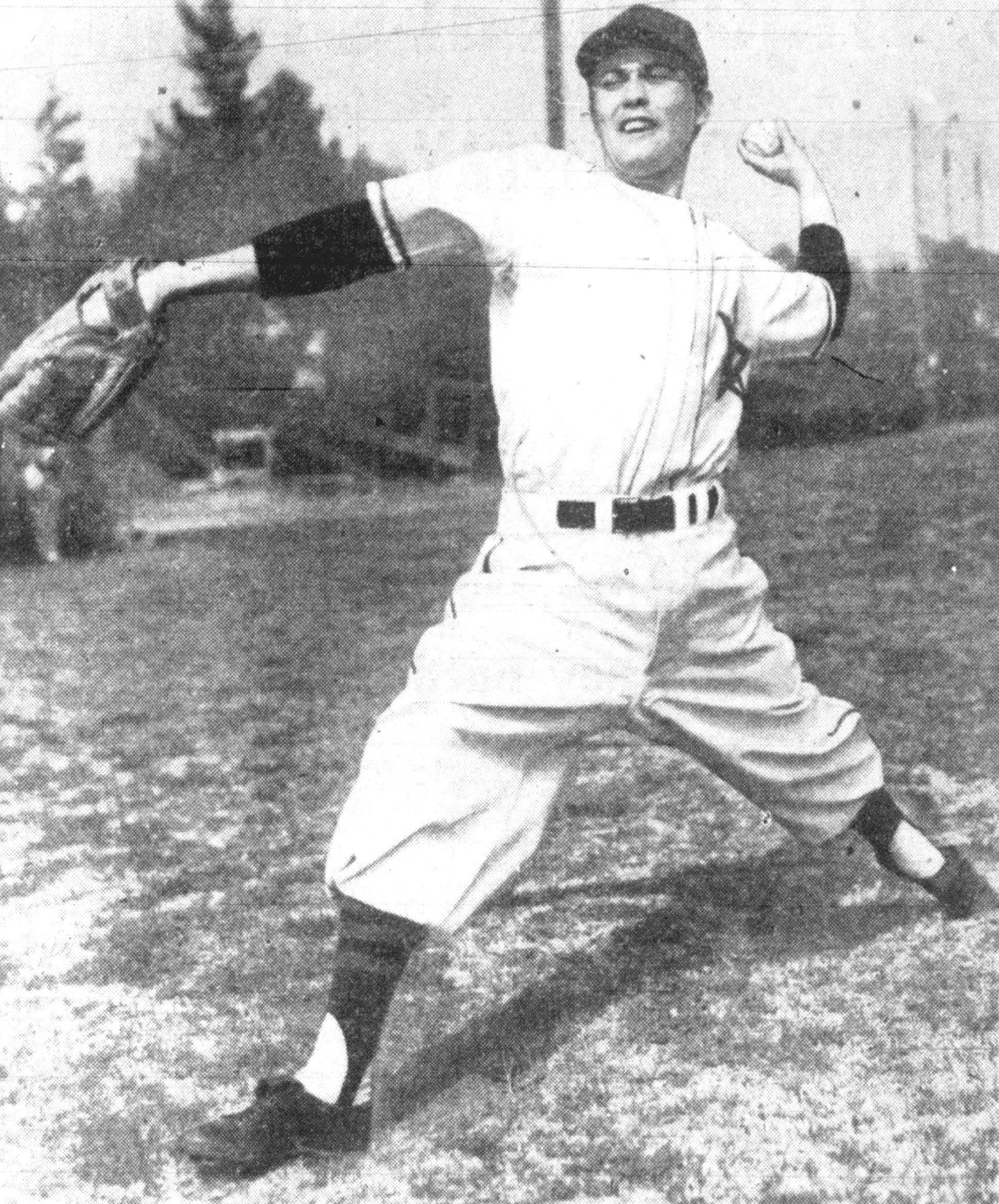
- Schallock, circa 1950
- Pitcher
- Born: April 25, 1924; Mill Valley, California, U.S.
- Died: March 6, 2025 (aged 100); Sonoma, California, U.S.
- Batted: Left Threw: Left

MLB debut
- July 16, 1951, for the New York Yankees

Last MLB appearance
- September 23, 1955, for the Baltimore Orioles

MLB statistics
- Win–loss record: 6–7
- Earned run average: 4.02
- Strikeouts: 77
- Stats at Baseball Reference

Teams
- New York Yankees (1951–1955); Baltimore Orioles (1955)

Career highlights and awards
- World Series champion (1953)

Arthur Lawrence Schallock (/ˈʃælək/; April 25, 1924 – March 6, 2025) was an American professional baseball pitcher who played in Major League Baseball (MLB) with the New York Yankees and Baltimore Orioles from 1951 to 1955. From 2022 until his death, Schallock was the oldest living former major league player.

== Early life ==
Art Schallock was born in Mill Valley, California on April 25, 1924, the fourth child and second son of Arthur, a telephone/telegraph lineman, and Alice Schallock. His older siblings were: Melvin (1911–1973), Alice (1913–1998), and Julia (1916–2006). Melvin was murdered in 1973. Schallock attended Tamalpais High School in Mill Valley. He played baseball, golf, and tennis at Tamalpais, and also played semi-professional baseball during the summers.

Schallock was drafted in 1943 and served in the United States Navy (1943–1946) during World War II as a radio operator on the aircraft carrier USS Coral Sea, which was later renamed the USS Anzio (CVE-57). He was present at the Battle of Makin, where USS Liscome Bay was sunk. After leaving the Navy, he attended Marin Junior College where he "made a name" for himself in baseball and was subsequently signed by the Brooklyn Dodgers in 1946.

== Professional baseball career ==
Schallock spent the 1947 season with the Class-A Pueblo Dodgers. He pitched for the Triple-A Montreal Royals in 1948. He then pitched for the Hollywood Stars of the Triple-A Pacific Coast League (PCL) in 1949 to 1951.

On July 12, 1951, the Dodgers traded Schallock to the New York Yankees for Eddie Malone, Bob Landeck, and cash considerations. He made his major league debut on July 16, with the Yankees optioning Mickey Mantle to Triple-A to make room on the roster. After getting off to a 9–3 start with the Kansas City Blues in 1953, Schallock was called up by the Yankees on July 6 when Ewell Blackwell retired. He pitched in Game 4 of the 1953 World Series for two innings, allowing one run.

On May 11, 1955, the Baltimore Orioles selected Schallock from the Yankees off of waivers. During spring training in 1956, the Orioles sold Schallock's contract to the Seattle Rainiers of the PCL. He retired in 1957. Schallock appeared in 58 major league games, including 14 as a starting pitcher, and allowed 199 hits and 91 bases on balls in 170 1/3 innings pitched, with 77 strikeouts.

== Personal life and death ==
After retiring from baseball, Schallock worked as a sporting goods salesman and in public relations for real estate companies. Schallock and his wife, Dona Bernard, were married for 76 years until her death in April 2023. They had two children and five grandchildren. He resided in Sonoma, California.

Following the death of George Elder on July 7, 2022, Schallock became the oldest living former major league baseball player. Schallock turned 100 in April 2024, and died at an assisted living community in Sonoma on March 6, 2025.

Records
Preceded by George Elder	Oldest recognized verified living baseball player July 7, 2022 – March 6, 2025	Succeeded by Bill Greason
