= Val Heim =

American baseball player (1920–2019)

- Left fielder
- Born: November 4, 1920; Plymouth, Wisconsin, U.S.
- Died: November 21, 2019 (aged 99); Superior, Nebraska, U.S.
- Batted: Left Threw: Right

debut
- August 31, 1942, for the Chicago White Sox

Last appearance
- September 22, 1942, for the Chicago White Sox

Career statistics
- Batting average: .200
- Home runs: 0
- Runs batted in: 7
- Stats at Baseball Reference

Teams
- Chicago White Sox (1942)

Val Raymond Heim (November 4, 1920 – November 21, 2019) was an American professional baseball left fielder who played in Major League Baseball (MLB) during the 1942 season. Listed at 5 ft 11 in (1.80 m), 170 lb (77 kg), he batted left-handed and threw right-handed.

Born in Plymouth, Wisconsin, Heim was one of many baseball players whose careers were interrupted by World War II. Heim was signed by the Chicago White Sox in 1940 and immediately was assigned to their minor league system. He posted a combined .328 batting average for two teams in 1941, gaining a promotion to the White Sox late in 1942. In 1942, Heim hit .200 (9-for-45) with six runs and seven runs batted in for Chicago in thirteen games, including one stolen base and a .294 on-base percentage. He joined the U.S. Navy at the end of the season.

Following his military discharge, Heim played in 1946 and 1948 in the White Sox minor league system, but he never appeared in a major league game again. In a five-year minor league career, he batted .285 and hit 35 home runs in 570 games. Following the death of Tom Jordan, he was recognized as the oldest living major league ballplayer. Heim died November 21, 2019, in his hometown of Superior, Nebraska.

Records
Preceded by Tom Jordan	Oldest recognized verified living baseball player August 26, 2019 – November 21, 2019	Succeeded by Eddie Robinson
