= Campbell, Nebraska =

- Village
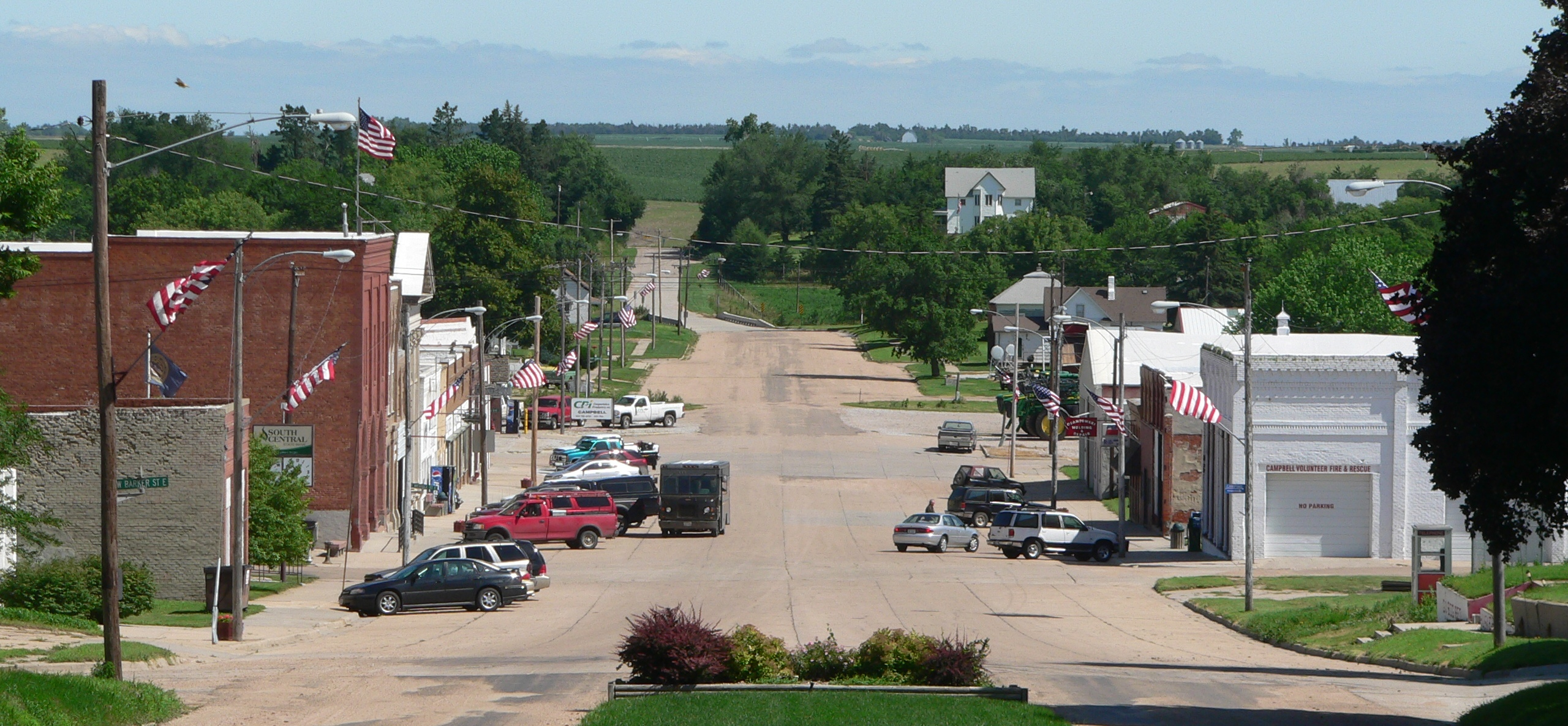
- Downtown Campbell: Broad Street, looking north.

- Location of Campbell, Nebraska
- Coordinates: 40°17′47″N 98°43′53″W
- Country: United States
- State: Nebraska
- County: Franklin

Area
  - Total: 0.41 sq mi (1.07 km^{2})
  - Land: 0.41 sq mi (1.07 km^{2})
  - Water: 0 sq mi (0.00 km^{2})
- Elevation: 2,054 ft (626 m)

Population (2020)
  - Total: 272
  - Density: 658/sq mi (254.1/km^{2})
- Time zone: UTC-6 (Central (CST))
  - Summer (DST): UTC-5 (CDT)
- ZIP code: 68932
- Area code: 402
- FIPS code: 31-07870
- GNIS feature ID: 2397543
- Website: campbellne.com

Campbell is a village in Franklin County, Nebraska, United States. As of the 2020 census, Campbell had a population of 272.

== History ==
Campbell was platted in 1886 on behalf of the railroad. Campbell was the name of one of the founders.

== Geography ==
According to the United States Census Bureau, the village has a total area of 0.41 square miles (1.06 km^{2}), all land.

== Demographics ==
Historical population
| Census | Pop. | Note | %± |
|---|---|---|---|
| 1900 | 368 | | — |
| 1910 | 573 | | 55.7% |
| 1920 | 561 | | −2.1% |
| 1930 | 565 | | 0.7% |
| 1940 | 478 | | −15.4% |
| 1950 | 412 | | −13.8% |
| 1960 | 424 | | 2.9% |
| 1970 | 447 | | 5.4% |
| 1980 | 441 | | −1.3% |
| 1990 | 432 | | −2.0% |
| 2000 | 387 | | −10.4% |
| 2010 | 347 | | −10.3% |
| 2020 | 272 | | −21.6% |
U.S. Decennial Census

=== 2010 census ===
As of the census of 2010, there were 347 people, 143 households, and 89 families residing in the village. The population density was 846.3 inhabitants per square mile (326.8/km^{2}). There were 172 housing units at an average density of 419.5 per square mile (162.0/km^{2}). The racial makeup of the village was 97.4% White, 1.2% Native American, and 1.4% from two or more races. Hispanic or Latino of any race were 0.9% of the population.

There were 143 households, of which 21.0% had children under the age of 18 living with them, 51.7% were married couples living together, 7.7% had a female householder with no husband present, 2.8% had a male householder with no wife present, and 37.8% were non-families. 35.7% of all households were made up of individuals, and 16.8% had someone living alone who was 65 years of age or older. The average household size was 2.22 and the average family size was 2.84.

The median age in the village was 49.3 years. 20.5% of residents were under the age of 18; 5.2% were between the ages of 18 and 24; 17.9% were from 25 to 44; 28.5% were from 45 to 64; and 28% were 65 years of age or older. The gender makeup of the village was 49.3% male and 50.7% female.

=== 2000 census ===
As of the census of 2000, there were 387 people, 151 households, and 101 families residing in the village. The population density was 1,068.9 inhabitants per square mile (412.7/km^{2}). There were 182 housing units at an average density of 502.7 per square mile (194.1/km^{2}). The racial makeup of the village was 98.19% White, 0.26% Native American, and 1.55% from two or more races. Hispanic or Latino of any race were 0.52% of the population.

There were 151 households, out of which 27.8% had children under the age of 18 living with them, 51.0% were married couples living together, 9.9% had a female householder with no husband present, and 32.5% were non-families. 29.8% of all households were made up of individuals, and 21.2% had someone living alone who was 65 years of age or older. The average household size was 2.32 and the average family size was 2.83.

In the village, the population was spread out, with 21.4% under the age of 18, 7.5% from 18 to 24, 20.7% from 25 to 44, 15.8% from 45 to 64, and 34.6% who were 65 years of age or older. The median age was 45 years. For every 100 females, there were 86.1 males. For every 100 females age 18 and over, there were 88.8 males.

As of 2000 the median income for a household in the village was $26,000, and the median income for a family was $33,438. Males had a median income of $27,917 versus $16,750 for females. The per capita income for the village was $13,594. About 7.4% of families and 13.3% of the population were below the poverty line, including 14.3% of those under age 18 and 13.0% of those age 65 or over.

== Notable person ==
Professional baseball player Barney Koch was born in Campbell in 1923.
