= John Douglas (baseball) =

American baseball player (1917–1984)

- First baseman
- Born: September 14, 1917; Thayer, West Virginia, U.S.
- Died: February 11, 1984 (aged 66); Miami, Florida, U.S.
- Batted: Left Threw: Left

MLB debut
- April 21, 1945, for the Brooklyn Dodgers

Last MLB appearance
- May 5, 1945, for the Brooklyn Dodgers

MLB statistics
- Batting average: .000
- Home runs: 0
- Runs scored: 0
- Stats at Baseball Reference

Teams
- Brooklyn Dodgers (1945)

John Franklin Douglas (September 14, 1917 – February 11, 1984) was an American first baseman in Major League Baseball who played five games during the 1945 season for the Brooklyn Dodgers. Born in Thayer, West Virginia, he died at age 66 in Miami, Florida.
