= Bob Abate =

Canadian amateur sports coach (1893–1981)

Robert Abate (25 November 1893 – 22 January 1981) was a Canadian sports coach and the driving force behind the Elizabeth Playground sports teams in Toronto. The "Lizzies", as they were known, won more than 200 titles at the city, provincial, and national levels in baseball, basketball, football, and hockey.

Among the players who competed for the Lizzies were Lionel Conacher, Nig Eisen, Goody Rosen and Alex Levinsky.

== 1929 Fatal car crash incident ==
On 7 September 1929, Abate and six members of the boys bantam baseball team were in a car heading to a playoff game in Peterborough, Ontario when the car crossed the highway's median and collided head-on with another car near Bowmanville, Ontario. Two 15-year-old members of the Elizabeth Playground bantam baseball team were killed in the accident, including team captain Benjamin "Benny" Wetstein and the short stop, Nathan Rubinoff. Abate initially said he was driving but later said that one of the boys killed in the crash, Rubinoff, had been behind the wheel. In November, Abate was found guilty of negligence in a fatal accident and was given a $1,000 fine and lost his driver's license for six months. In December, a civil suit filed by Wetnstein and Rubinoff's parents resulted in the Parks Commission forbidding teams playing under its name from travelling outside the city to play games as result of the deadly collision near Bowmanville in September.

== Coaching philosophy ==
During an interview in April 1963, with the Toronto Star, Abate stated that his coaching style was not a "win-at-any-cost attitude," but said, "I liked my guys to play as hard as they could, battle every inch of the way. If they won, so much the better. But I expect them to forget the game once the final out was made or the final whistle blown."

When he started working at the Elizabeth Playground, the area was mainly Jewish immigrant families, and other nationalities and races. Abate saw sports as way to bring all the kids from all over the world together, as he said:

Ours was a melting pot of nations. If a lad couldn't get along with his teammates, we soon eased him out. The person, not his nationality, religion or colour, was the important thing.

== Recognition ==
Before Abate retired as a supervisor for the City of Toronto's Parks and Recreation department, in November 1963, his former players and opponents paid tribute to him at a special diner on 2 May 1963. Organized by former Lizzie's member Harry Sniderman, Abate was lauded by 400 people at the King Edward Hotel, including speeches from then current Metro Toronto chairman William Allen and then Toronto mayor Donald Summerville. He received a going away present of $2,000 (about $20,500 in 2024 dollars) from the fundraising diner.

Abate was inducted into Canada's Sports Hall of Fame in 1976.

In 1990, the Elizabeth Recreation Centre in Toronto was renamed the Bob Abate Community Recreation Centre.

== Personal life and death ==
Abate was married to Patricia Abate (1930–2018) they had two daughters Anne Abate and Laura Abate. He is survived by his oldest daughter Anne, his grandchildren Adele Newton, Chrisanne Newton and Terrence Abate as well as his great grandchildren Luca Angelino, Malachi and Iliyanna Yorke-Abate.
