= Pat Capri =

American baseball player (1918-1989)

- Second baseman
- Born: November 27, 1918; New York City, U.S.
- Died: June 14, 1989 (aged 70); New York City, U.S.
- Batted: Right Threw: Right

MLB debut
- July 16, 1944, for the Boston Braves

Last MLB appearance
- July 16, 1944, for the Boston Braves

MLB statistics
- Batting average: .000
- Home runs: 0
- Runs batted in: 0
- Runs scored: 1
- Stats at Baseball Reference

Teams
- Boston Braves (1944)

Patrick Nicholas Capri (November 27, 1918 – June 14, 1989) was an American former Major League Baseball player. He played one season with the Boston Braves in 1944.
