= Barney Koch =

American baseball player (1923-1987)

- Second baseman
- Born: March 23, 1923; Campbell, Nebraska
- Died: June 6, 1987 (aged 64); Tacoma, Washington
- Batted: Right Threw: Right

MLB debut
- July 23, 1944, for the Brooklyn Dodgers

Last MLB appearance
- October 1, 1944, for the Brooklyn Dodgers

MLB statistics
- Batting average: .219
- Home runs: 0
- Runs: 11
- Stats at Baseball Reference

Teams
- Brooklyn Dodgers (1944)

Barnett Koch (March 23, 1923 – June 6, 1987) was an American second baseman in Major League Baseball who played for the Brooklyn Dodgers during the 1944 baseball season. Born in Campbell, Nebraska, he died at age 64 in Tacoma, Washington.
