= Barney White =

American baseball player (1923-2002)

- Infielder
- Born: June 25, 1923; Paris, Texas, U.S.
- Died: July 24, 2002 (aged 79); Tyler, Texas, U.S.
- Batted: Right Threw: Right

MLB debut
- June 5, 1945, for the Brooklyn Dodgers

Last MLB appearance
- June 16, 1945, for the Brooklyn Dodgers

MLB statistics
- Batting average: .000
- Home runs: 0
- Runs scored: 2
- Stats at Baseball Reference

Teams
- Brooklyn Dodgers (1945)

William Barney White (June 25, 1923 – July 24, 2002), nicknamed "Bear", was an American infielder in Major League Baseball who played four games during the 1945 season for the Brooklyn Dodgers. Born in Paris, Texas, he died at age 79 in Tyler, Texas.
