= Clancy Smyres =

American baseball player (1922–2007)

- Pinch hitter
- Born: May 24, 1922; Culver City, California, U.S.
- Died: November 27, 2007 (aged 85); Lancaster, California, U.S.
- Batted: Switch Threw: Right

MLB debut
- April 18, 1944, for the Brooklyn Dodgers

Last MLB appearance
- April 30, 1944, for the Brooklyn Dodgers

MLB statistics
- Batting average: .000
- Runs scored: 1
- RBI: 0
- Stats at Baseball Reference

Teams
- Brooklyn Dodgers (1944)

Clarence Melvin Smyres (May 24, 1922 – November 27, 2007) was an American professional baseball player who played for the Brooklyn Dodgers of Major League Baseball in 1944.

== Biography ==
Smyres was signed by the Brooklyn Dodgers in 1944 after an injury to shortstop-manager Leo Durocher.

Smyres appeared in five games for the Brooklyn Dodgers during the 1944 Major League Baseball season, recording two at bats but no hits. He never played defense for the Dodgers.

Though having never recorded a major league hit, his autograph is one of the rarest among former athletes and is highly sought by collectors. Items signed by Smyres consistently fetch high prices at auction. This is due to the fact that Smyres refused all autograph requests, no matter how much money someone would offer him. However, his signature has been obtained from a few items, including a hotel register that he had signed and a 1944 Trenton Packers team autographed ball.

Smyres was buried at Forest Lawn Memorial Park in Los Angeles.
