= George Elder (baseball) =

American baseball player (1921–2022)

- Outfielder
- Born: March 10, 1921; Lebanon, Kentucky, U.S.
- Died: July 7, 2022 (aged 101); Fruita, Colorado, U.S.
- Batted: Left Threw: Right

MLB debut
- July 22, 1949, for the St. Louis Browns

Last MLB appearance
- September 25, 1949, for the St. Louis Browns

MLB statistics
- Batting average: .250
- Home runs: 0
- Runs batted in: 2
- Stats at Baseball Reference

Teams
- St. Louis Browns (1949)

George Rezin Elder Jr. (March 10, 1921 – July 7, 2022) was an American professional baseball outfielder. He played one season in Major League Baseball, appearing in 41 games with the St. Louis Browns in 1949.

== Early life ==
Elder was born in Lebanon, Kentucky, in March 1921, the youngest of four children of George Rezin Elder Sr and Mary Ellen "Lilly" Elder. His mother died when George Jr. was one; the family moved to Louisville, Kentucky, in the 1920s, then a few years later to Chicago and finally to Los Angeles. He served as a Marine artilleryman in the Pacific theatre, including in the Battle of Iwo Jima.

Elder was a running back for the Fordham University football team. He considered attending the University of Notre Dame, where his brother Jack had been a running back. Elder, who ran the 100-yard dash in 9.9 seconds, said that he chose Fordham to avoid comparisons to his brother. Elder ended up playing for the freshman team in 1941 and the varsity team in 1942. In October 1942, he sustained a broken foot in a game against West Virginia University.

In the summer of 1943, Fordham shut down its football program. Elder went to Dartmouth College that fall as part of the V-12 Navy College Training Program. When he arrived at Dartmouth, he was described as dealing with some chronic injuries, and he elected to play baseball instead of football. After serving in the Marine Corps in World War II and seeing action at Iwo Jima, Elder was discharged and finished college at the University of California, Los Angeles, where he also played for the UCLA baseball team.

== Baseball career ==
In 1947 and 1948, Elder appeared with the Toledo Mud Hens, a minor league affiliate of the St. Louis Browns. In the spring of 1948, he was also named to the UCLA baseball coaching staff. He played for several other minor league teams before making his major league debut as a pinch-runner on July 22, 1949. Two days later he made his first plate appearance, with a single against Ellis Kinder, scoring Paul Lehner. It was the game-winning hit in a 9–8 Browns win.

In Elder's lone major league season, he started seven games and appeared on defense in 10 games (all in left field). He was used as a pinch hitter 22 times, and he appeared as a pinch runner 11 times. Elder spent only one more season in professional baseball. He tallied 11 hits in 44 official at bats for a .250 batting average, with three doubles and two runs batted in. Elder played for the Wichita Indians, a Browns affiliate, in 1950, hitting .284 in 144 games. Before his death in 2022, he was one of only four living former St. Louis Browns players, along with Billy Hunter, Ed Mickelson, and Frank Saucier.

== Personal life ==
Elder spent his later years as a Los Angeles County sheriff's deputy and as a bailiff in a court in Santa Monica, California. He was later married to Helen Bennett. Elder was married a second time, in 1985, to Mary Ann. He started training horses with his wife Mary Ann. In 2005 they moved to Fruita, Colorado, where they lived as of 2020. He turned 100 in March 2021.

Following the death of Eddie Robinson on October 4, 2021, Elder became the oldest living former major league baseball player. He died in Fruita, Colorado, on July 7, 2022, at the age of 101.

Records
| Preceded by Eddie Robinson | Oldest recognized verified living baseball player October 4, 2021 – July 7, 2022 | Succeeded by Art Schallock |
