= Jack Franklin =

American baseball player (1919-1991)

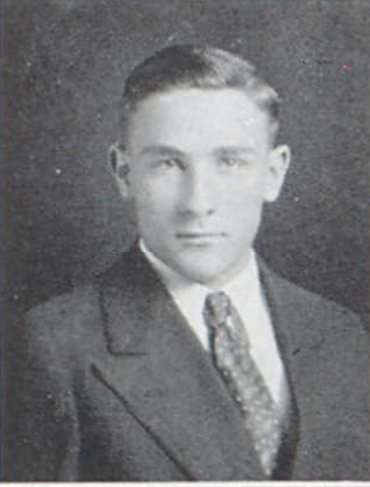
- Pitcher
- Born: October 20, 1919; Paris, Illinois, U.S.
- Died: November 15, 1991 (aged 72); Panama City, Florida, U.S.
- Batted: Right Threw: Right

MLB debut
- June 12, 1944, for the Brooklyn Dodgers

Last MLB appearance
- June 12, 1944, for the Brooklyn Dodgers

MLB statistics
- Win–loss record: 0–0
- Earned run average: 13.50
- Strikeouts: 0
- Stats at Baseball Reference

Teams
- Brooklyn Dodgers (1944)

James Wilford Franklin (October 20, 1919 – November 15, 1991) was an American pitcher in Major League Baseball. He pitched in 1 game for the Brooklyn Dodgers during the 1944 season, pitching two innings and giving up three earned runs.

Born in Paris, Illinois, Franklin died in Panama City, Florida.
