= Stan Klopp =

American baseball player

- Pitcher
- Born: December 22, 1910; Womelsdorf, Pennsylvania, U.S.
- Died: March 11, 1980 (aged 69); Robesonia, Pennsylvania, U.S.
- Batted: Right Threw: Right

MLB debut
- April 29, 1944, for the Boston Braves

Last MLB appearance
- August 5, 1944, for the Boston Braves

MLB statistics
- Win–loss record: 1–2
- Earned run average: 4.66
- Strikeouts: 17
- Stats at Baseball Reference

Teams
- Boston Braves (1944)

Stanley Harold "Betz" Klopp (December 22, 1910 – March 11, 1980) was an American Major League Baseball pitcher. He played one season with the Boston Braves in 1944.

Klopp's lone victory came on July 30 over the Pittsburgh Pirates. Entering the game to replace an injured pitcher, Klopp successfully retired the next 2 batters before being replaced when the Braves next batted. The Braves regained the lead in that inning, with Klopp recording the victory.
