= Frenchy Bordagaray =

American baseball player (1910–2000)

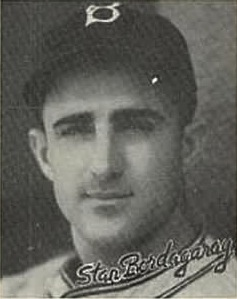
- Bordagaray in 1936
- Outfielder / Third baseman
- Born: January 3, 1910; Coalinga, California, U.S.
- Died: April 13, 2000 (aged 90); Ventura, California, U.S.
- Batted: Right Threw: Right

MLB debut
- April 17, 1934, for the Chicago White Sox

Last MLB appearance
- September 30, 1945, for the Brooklyn Dodgers

MLB statistics
- Batting average: .283
- Home runs: 14
- Runs batted in: 270
- Stats at Baseball Reference

Teams
- Chicago White Sox (1934); Brooklyn Dodgers (1935–1936); St. Louis Cardinals (1937–1938); Cincinnati Reds (1939); New York Yankees (1941); Brooklyn Dodgers (1942–1945)

Career highlights and awards
- World Series champion (1941)

Stanley George "Frenchy" Bordagaray (January 3, 1910 – April 13, 2000) was an American professional baseball player. He played in Major League Baseball (MLB) as an outfielder and third baseman for the Chicago White Sox, Brooklyn Dodgers, St. Louis Cardinals, Cincinnati Reds, and New York Yankees between 1934 and 1945. He had a .283 batting average with 14 home runs and 270 runs batted in over 930 major league games for his career.

Bordagaray gained publicity through the press through his colorful personality and various gimmicks. He appeared in bit parts in movies and grew a mustache in a time when baseball players were expected to be clean shaven. He has been inducted into the Brooklyn Dodgers Hall of Fame, the Fresno County Athletic Hall of Fame, and the Ventura County Sports Hall of Fame.

== Early life ==
Bordagaray was born in Coalinga, California, on January 3, 1910, to Dominique and Louise Bordagaray, who were original settlers of the San Joaquin Valley. Bordagaray was the middle of seven children.

Of Basque and French descent, Bordagaray got his nickname from his mother. His father wanted him to become a violinist. He lettered in baseball, football, and track and field at Fresno State College.

== Professional career ==
=== Early career (1931–1933) ===
Bordagaray made his professional baseball debut in minor league baseball with the Sacramento Senators of the Pacific Coast League (PCL) during the 1931 season. They originally gave him a three-week tryout without pay, so that he could retain his amateur status; at the end of the tryout, the Senators offered Bordagaray his first professional contract. At only 20 years of age, Bordagaray's father needed to provide his consent. Though his father initially refused and threatened to take the Senators to court, he changed his mind after visiting his son. Fresno State's football coach, Stan Borleske, attempted to negotiate Bordagaray's release, but Senators owner Lewis Moreing refused.

Bordagaray led the PCL in batting average (.373) during the 1931 season. He publicly held out from the Senators for more money during the offseason, which became an annual tradition for Bordagaray. In the 1932 season, he batted .322 in 173 games played. He followed this up by batting .351 in 117 games during the 1933 season.

While with the Senators, Bordagaray raced a horse in a 100-yard dash, losing by a few feet. During a game, Bordagaray reportedly went to use the toilet during the ninth inning. While he was off the field, the pitcher threw the ball, unaware he had no right fielder. The batter hit the pitch to right field, leading to a double. Manager Earl McNeely did not criticize Bordagaray, rather telling the pitcher to make sure his fielders were in place before throwing.

=== Major League Baseball ===
==== Chicago White Sox and Brooklyn Dodgers (1934–1936) ====
The Chicago White Sox bought Bordagaray's contract from Sacramento for $15,000 (equivalent to $361,007 in 2025) in the spring of 1934. He batted .322 with a .344 on-base percentage (OBP) and .379 slugging percentage (SLG), with no home runs, two runs batted in in 29 games for the 1934 Chicago White Sox. Evar Swanson reclaimed the role he held in 1933 as starting right fielder for Chicago, and Bordagaray was returned to Sacramento in June, reclaiming their money. He spent the rest of 1934 with the Senators, batting .321 with 34 doubles and a .433 slugging percentage. After the 1934 season, the Senators traded Bordagaray to the Brooklyn Dodgers for Johnny Frederick, Art Herring and cash. He hit .282 with a .319 OBP and .363 SLG with 18 steals and 69 runs scored for the 1935 Dodgers. He was third in the National League (NL) in steals, four behind leader Augie Galan and two behind Pepper Martin.

"I was making $3,000 a year playing baseball, so I figured I could at least have fun while I was not getting rich. But after I had [the mustache] about two months, Casey [Stengel] called me into the clubhouse and said, 'If anyone's going to be a clown on this club, it's going to be me.'"

— Frenchy Bordagaray

Bordagaray showed up at spring training in 1936 with a mustache, which he grew for a bit role in The Prisoner of Shark Island, filmed during the offseason. This was scandalous, as baseball players were expected to be clean shaven at the time; the last player believed to have worn a mustache was Wally Schang during the 1914 season. Looking for stories to write about, sportswriters for the Dodgers encouraged Bordagaray to grow out his mustache and goatee. The Brooklyn Eagle hosted a contest to determine what sort of beard Bordagaray should grow. After a few months, Dodgers manager Casey Stengel made him shave, saying "If anyone's going to be a clown on this club, it's going to be me." Mustaches would not be seen in MLB again until Oakland Athletics owner Charlie O. Finley paid his players to grow facial hair in the 1970s. Finley hosted a "mustache day", and invited Bordagaray to serve as master of ceremonies.

Heading into the 1936 season, Stengel decided to use Bordagaray as his starting third baseman. For the year, Bordagaray batted .315 with a .346 OBP and .419 SLG for the Dodgers, finishing ninth in the NL with 12 steals. He was third among the team's regulars in average, behind Babe Phelps and Joe Stripp. His .991 fielding percentage was second among outfielders in the NL, trailing only teammate Johnny Cooney. That season, however, he received a $500 fine and 60-day suspension for spitting at an umpire. When asked about it, Bordagaray replied, "The penalty is a bit more than I expectorated."

Bordagaray became known for his sayings, some of which exemplified the Dodgers' daffiness. One day after the Dodgers beat the Cardinals, 4-3, he said, "I accounted for all seven runs. I knocked in four myself and played a Terry Moore hit into a three-run homer."

==== St. Louis Cardinals and Cincinnati Reds (1937–1939) ====
With Burleigh Grimes succeeding Stengel as the Dodgers' manager after the 1936 season, the Dodgers sold Bordagaray, Jimmy Jordan and Dutch Leonard to the St. Louis Cardinals as part of an off-season shakeup; it was seen as the completion of an August 1 trade in which the Dodgers acquired Tom Winsett from the Cardinals. With the Cardinals, Bordagaray batted .293 with a .331 OBP and .367 SLG during the 1937 season. His 11 stolen bases were eighth best in the NL. With the 1938 Cardinals, Bordagaray was used mostly as a bench player, as Enos Slaughter joined the team, playing in the outfield with Joe Medwick, Terry Moore, and Martin, and Art Garibaldi was set to play third base. Bordagaray batted .282 with a .325 OBP and .327 SLG with only two steals in 1938. While a member of the Cardinals, Bordagaray played the washboard in Martin's "Mudcat Band".

Upon the conclusion of the 1938 season, the Cardinals assigned Bordagaray to their farm team in Rochester. They traded Bordagaray to the Cincinnati Reds for Dusty Cooke and cash later in the offseason. In 63 games with the Reds in 1939, his batting average declined to .197, as did his OBP (.252) and SLG (.254). In the 1939 World Series, he pinch ran twice for Ernie Lombardi, but did not play in the field or have a plate appearance.

==== New York Yankees and return to the Dodgers (1940–1945) ====
Bordagaray was sent with Nino Bongiovanni to the New York Yankees after the 1939 season, completing an earlier trade made on August 5 in which the Reds sent players to be named later and $40,000 ($925,837 in current dollar terms) to the New York Yankees for Vince DiMaggio. Bordagaray spent the 1940 season in the minor leagues, with the Kansas City Blues of the American Association. The Yankees promoted Bordagaray in 1941. He hit .260 with a .325 OBP and .274 SLG in 36 games during the regular season, and appeared in one game during the 1941 World Series as a pinch runner for Bill Dickey.

He's either the greatest rotten third baseman in baseball or the rottenest great third baseman. But he's never in between.

— Branch Rickey

Before the 1942 season, the Dodgers purchased Bordagaray from the Yankees. He hit .241 with a .279 OBP and .276 SLG in 48 games with the 1942 Dodgers, and .302 with a .379 OBP and .384 SLG in 89 games during the 1943 season. As Brooklyn's primary third baseman and leadoff hitter in 1944, Bordagaray hit .281 with a .331 OBP and .385 SLG with 85 runs in 501 at-bats, topping 100 games played for the first time since 1936. During the 1945 season, he batted .256 with a .328 OBP and .355 SLG, fielding only .886 at third base, and coming in third in the league in errors, despite playing in only 57 games.

=== Later career (1946–1948) ===
The Dodgers released Bordagaray before the 1946 season. Returning to minor league baseball, he spent 1946 with the Trois-Rivières Royals of the Class-C Canadian–American League as a player–manager, winning both the league's Most Valuable Player (MVP) and Manager of the Year awards. In 1947, he was player-manager of the Greenville Spinners of the Class-A South Atlantic League. Bordagaray was suspended 60 games for fighting an umpire, leading the Spinners to hire Martin to replace him. He attempted to return to MLB with the Dodgers in 1948, but retired before the season.

== Post-playing career ==
After his baseball career, Bordagaray owned restaurants and clubs in St. Louis and Kansas City and developed land as cemeteries in the Midwestern United States. He sold graveyard plots in Coalinga, California. He moved to Ventura, California, in 1961, where he was supervisor of youth sports and recreation programs in the Ventura Recreation Department.

Bordagaray was named to the Fresno County and Ventura County Sports Halls of Fame, as well as the Brooklyn Dodgers Hall of Fame. Proud of his publicity, he kept newspaper clippings in a scrapbook that weighs 15 pounds (6.8 kg).

Bordagaray died in a nursing home in Ventura at the age of 90. He was survived by his wife of 52 years, Victoria, two sons, two daughters, seven grandchildren, and six great-grandchildren. He is interred at Pleasant Valley Cemetery in Coalinga.
