= Gene Patton =

American baseball player (1926-2009)

- Second baseman / Pinch runner
- Born: July 8, 1926; Coatesville, Pennsylvania, U.S.
- Died: June 25, 2009 (aged 82); Lancaster, Pennsylvania, U.S.
- Batted: Left Threw: Right

MLB debut
- June 17, 1944, for the Boston Braves

Last MLB appearance
- June 17, 1944, for the Boston Braves

MLB statistics
- At-bats: 0
- Home runs: 0
- Runs batted in: 0
- Games played: 1
- Stats at Baseball Reference

Teams
- Boston Braves (1944)

Gene Tunney Patton (July 8, 1926 – June 25, 2009) was an American Major League Baseball player. He played one game with the Boston Braves on June 17, 1944.
