= John Wells (baseball) =

American baseball player (1922-1993)

- Pitcher
- Born: November 25, 1922; Junction City, Kansas, U.S.
- Died: October 23, 1993 (aged 70); Olean, New York, U.S.
- Batted: Right Threw: Right

MLB debut
- September 14, 1944, for the Brooklyn Dodgers

Last MLB appearance
- September 28, 1944, for the Brooklyn Dodgers

MLB statistics
- Win–loss record: 0–2
- Earned run average: 5.40
- Strikeouts: 7
- Stats at Baseball Reference

Teams
- Brooklyn Dodgers (1944)

John Frederick Wells (November 25, 1922 – October 23, 1993) was an American pitcher in Major League Baseball. He pitched in 4 games (2 of them starts) for the Brooklyn Dodgers during the 1944 season.

Born in Junction City, Kansas, Wells died in Olean, New York.
