= George Woodend =

American baseball player (1917-1980)

- Pitcher
- Born: December 9, 1917; Hartford, Connecticut, U.S.
- Died: May 1, 1980 (aged 62); Hartford, Connecticut, U.S.
- Batted: Right Threw: Right

MLB debut
- April 22, 1944, for the Boston Braves

Last MLB appearance
- May 2, 1944, for the Boston Braves

MLB statistics
- Win–loss record: 0–0
- Earned run average: 13.50
- Strikeouts: 0
- Stats at Baseball Reference

Teams
- Boston Braves (1944)

George Anthony "Dandy" Woodend (December 9, 1917 – May 1, 1980) was an American professional baseball pitcher. He appeared in three games in Major League Baseball with the Boston Braves in 1944.

Woodend was recruited out of a Hartford, Connecticut high school by the Philadelphia Athletics. Immediately following graduation in 1937, he was scheduled to report to the Athletics, where he said they would send him to Temple University. He attended spring training with the A's in 1938, but was soon optioned to the Minor League Baseball Class A Williamsport Grays.
