= Roy Jarvis =

American baseball player (1926–1990)

- Catcher
- Born: June 7, 1926; Shawnee, Oklahoma, U.S.
- Died: January 13, 1990 (aged 63); Oklahoma City, Oklahoma, U.S.
- Batted: Right Threw: Right

MLB debut
- April 30, 1944, for the Brooklyn Dodgers

Last MLB appearance
- September 14, 1947, for the Pittsburgh Pirates

MLB statistics
- Batting average: .160
- Home runs: 1
- Runs scored: 4
- Stats at Baseball Reference

Teams
- Brooklyn Dodgers (1944); Pittsburgh Pirates (1946–1947)

Leroy Gilbert Jarvis (June 7, 1926 – January 13, 1990) was an American professional baseball player. He debuted at age 17 in Major League Baseball as a catcher for the Brooklyn Dodgers in 1944 during the World War II manpower shortage. He struck out in his only at bat, but later appeared in another 20 games for the 1946–1947 Pittsburgh Pirates, in addition to having a ten-year playing career in minor league baseball.

Born in Shawnee, Oklahoma, Jarvis batted and threw right-handed and was listed at 5 feet 9 inches (1.75 m) tall and 160 pounds (73 kg). He signed with Brooklyn after graduation from Central High School in Oklahoma City. In his one game for the Dodgers, an April 30, 1944, 26–8 defeat at the hands of the New York Giants, Jarvis relieved starting catcher Mickey Owen and fanned against Harry Feldman. He spent the remainder of the 1944 season in the minors, then was drafted by the Pirates that autumn in the Rule 5 draft. After serving in the United States Navy during 1945, the final wartime year, he resumed his baseball career in 1946 by appearing in two games for the Pirates. Jarvis split 1947 between Pittsburgh and the Triple-A Indianapolis Indians, hitting his only MLB home run off Clayton Lambert of the Cincinnati Reds on April 18.

In all, Jarvis made 57 plate appearances in the Majors, with eight hits and seven bases on balls.
