= Frank Drews =

American baseball player (1916-1972)

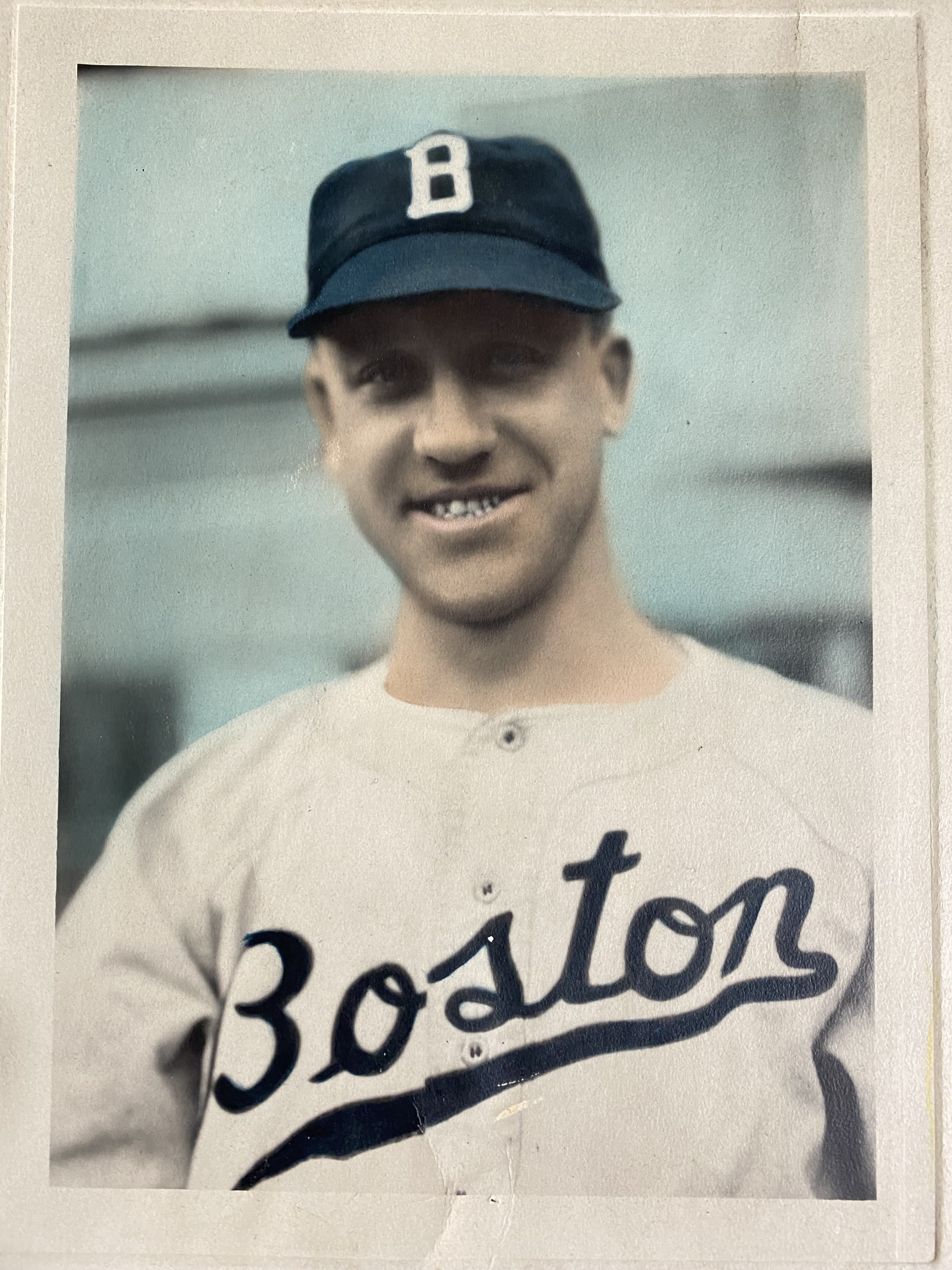
- Frank Drews in his Boston Braves Uniform
- Second baseman
- Born: May 25, 1916; Buffalo, New York
- Died: April 22, 1972 (aged 55); Buffalo, New York
- Batted: Right Threw: Right

MLB debut
- August 13, 1944, for the Boston Braves

Last MLB appearance
- August 5, 1945, for the Boston Braves

MLB statistics
- Batting average: .205
- Home runs: 0
- Runs batted in: 29
- Stats at Baseball Reference

Teams
- Boston Braves (1944–1945)

Frank John Drews (May 25, 1916 – April 22, 1972) was a Major League Baseball second baseman who played for the Boston Braves in 1944 and 1945. He stood 5 ft 10 in (1.78 m) and weighed 175 lbs.

Drews is one of many ballplayers who only appeared in the major leagues during World War II. He made his major league debut on August 13, 1944 in a road doubleheader against the Pittsburgh Pirates at Forbes Field. His last game for Boston was on August 5, 1945.

He was a typical example of what Mike González termed "good field, no hit." Career totals include 95 games played, a .205 batting average (59-for-288), 29 runs batted in, and 27 runs scored. 41 walks and 1 hit by pitch, however, did push his on-base percentage up to .306. On defense, he had a .967 fielding percentage, which was just above the league average for his era.

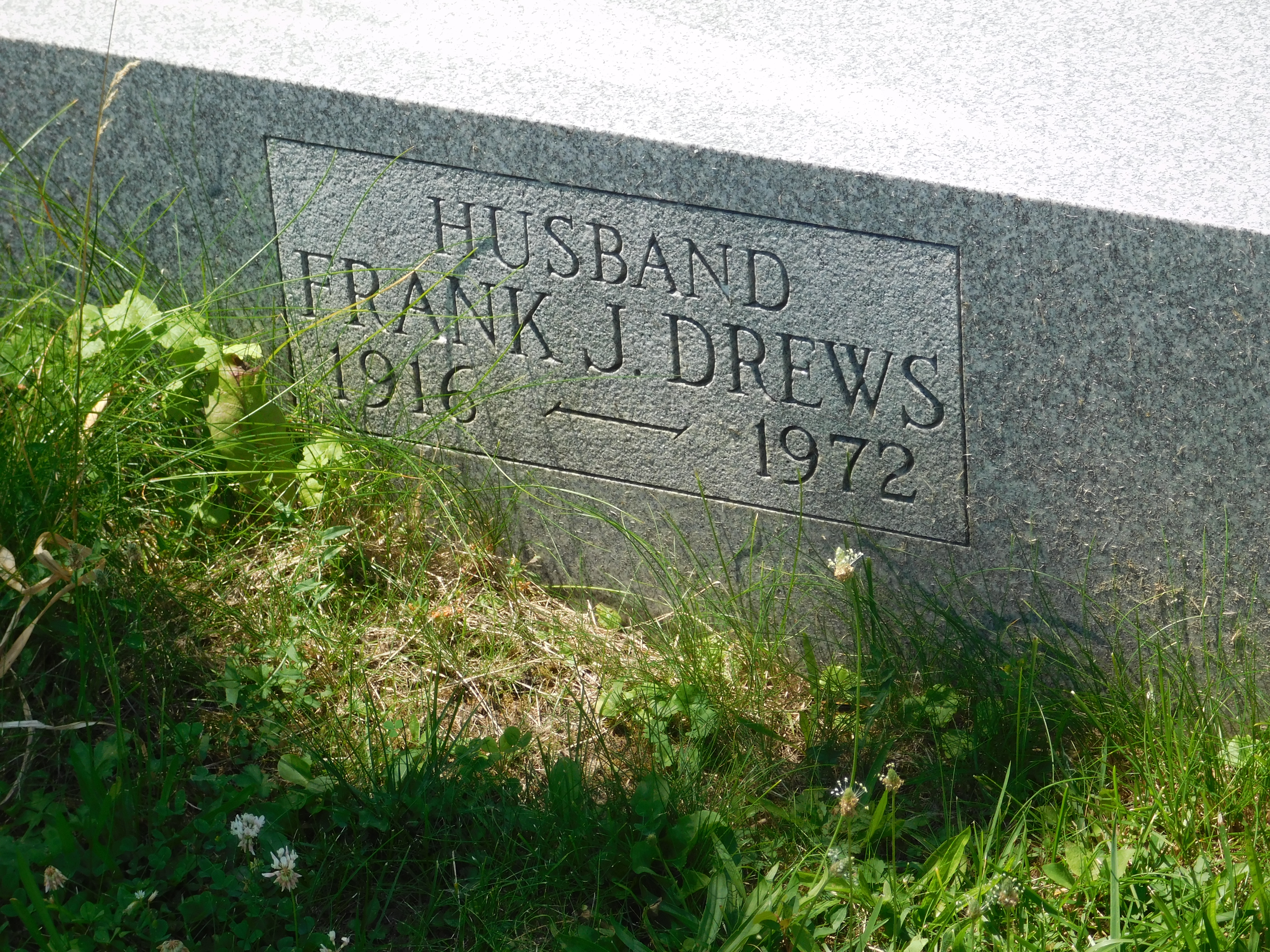
Frank Drews' grave at St. Stanislaus Cemetery, Cheektowaga, New York

Drews died in his hometown of Buffalo, New York at the age of 55 after four weeks hospitalized at Buffalo General Hospital.
