= Claude Crocker =

American baseball player (1924–2002)

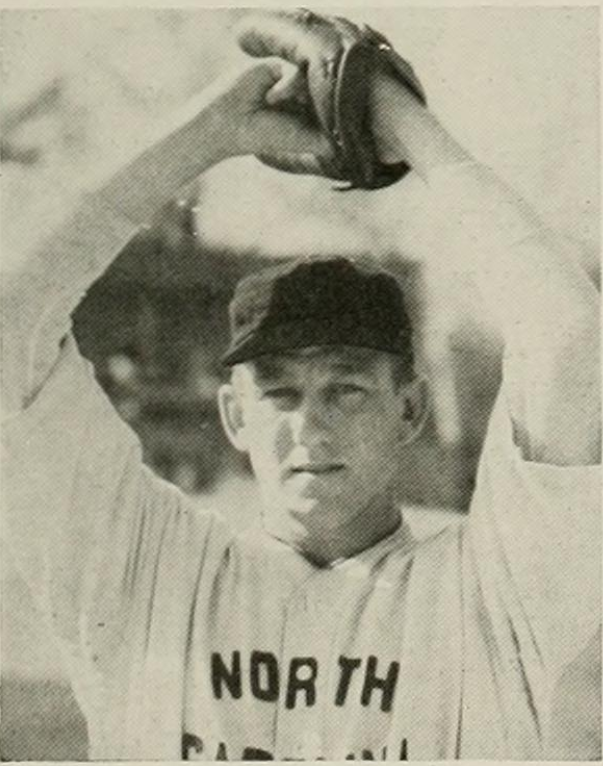
- Crocker as a player for the North Carolina Tar Heels, 1944
- Pitcher
- Born: July 20, 1924; Caroleen, North Carolina, U.S.
- Died: December 19, 2002 (aged 78); Clinton, South Carolina, U.S.
- Batted: Right Threw: Right

MLB debut
- August 1, 1944, for the Brooklyn Dodgers

Last MLB appearance
- September 30, 1945, for the Brooklyn Dodgers

MLB statistics
- Win–loss record: 0–0
- Earned run average: 6.75
- Strikeouts: 2
- Stats at Baseball Reference

Teams
- Brooklyn Dodgers (1944–1945)

Claude Arthur Crocker (July 20, 1924 – December 19, 2002) was an American Major League Baseball pitcher for the Brooklyn Dodgers in 1944 and 1945. The 6 ft 2 in (1.88 m), 185 lb (84 kg) right-hander was a native of Caroleen, North Carolina.

Crocker is one of many ballplayers who only appeared in the major leagues during World War II. He pitched a total of three games, all in relief, and his last one was his best. On September 30, 1945, the last day of the season, Crocker pitched two scoreless innings to earn a save in a 4–1 victory over the Philadelphia Phillies at Shibe Park. Totals for his brief career include 2 games finished, 4 earned runs allowed in 5 1/3 innings pitched, and an ERA of 6.75. He was perfect at the plate and on defense, going 1-for-1 (1.000) and recording 1 assist without making an error.

Crocker was also the head basketball coach at Presbyterian College for one year during the 1949–50 season. He coached the Blue Hose to a 14–15 record.

Crocker died at the age of 78 in Clinton, South Carolina.
