= Goody Rosen =

Canadian baseball player (1912–1994)

- Outfielder
- Born: August 28, 1912; Toronto, Ontario, Canada
- Died: April 6, 1994 (aged 81); Toronto, Ontario, Canada
- Batted: Left Threw: Left

MLB debut
- September 14, 1937, for the Brooklyn Dodgers

Last MLB appearance
- September 26, 1946, for the New York Giants

MLB statistics
- Batting average: .291
- Home runs: 22
- Runs batted in: 197
- Stats at Baseball Reference

Teams
- Brooklyn Dodgers (1937–1939, 1944–1946); New York Giants (1946)

Career highlights and awards
- All-Star (1945)

Member of the Canadian

Baseball Hall of Fame
- Induction: 1984

Goodwin George Rosen (August 28, 1912 – April 6, 1994) was a Canadian professional baseball outfielder. He played in Major League Baseball (MLB) before and after World War II for the Brooklyn Dodgers and New York Giants. He batted and threw left-handed.

== Early years ==
Rosen was born in Toronto, Canada, to Russian Jewish immigrants from Minsk (now, Belarus), Samuel and Rebecca Rosen, was the fifth of eight children and was Jewish. Rosen played in the city's playground leagues, including two years with the Elizabeth Playground team under Bob Abate, and attended Parkdale Collegiate Institute. His older brother Jake was a boxer who fought out of New York and Chicago in the 1920s under the name Johnny Rosen. Another brother, Willie, had a tryout with the Syracuse Chiefs in 1941. As a teenager, Rosen was a top player in Toronto's Jewish Fraternal Softball League. Rosen drove to Tampa, Florida, to try out with some minor league professional baseball teams, but he was told he was too small (5 ft 9 in) and returned to Toronto to play for the St. Mary's senior team.

== Professional baseball ==
Rosen turned professional in 1931, signing a contract with the Rochester Red Wings of the International League, but did not stick with the team. In 1933, while weighing only 135 pounds, he hit .301 while playing for the Louisville Colonels of the AAA American Association, and played under manager Burleigh Grimes. He batted .309 For Louisville in 1934, .293 in 1935, .314 in 1936, and .312 in 1937.

When Grimes joined the Brooklyn Dodgers in 1937, he convinced the team to acquire Rosen in August for $10,000 ($224,000 today) and a player. Rosen hit .312 in 22 games with the Dodgers.

In 1938, his first full season, he hit .281, finishing sixth in the National League in triples (11), leading all league outfielders in fielding percentage (.989) and assists (19). The next season, he split his time between the Dodgers and their Triple-A International League affiliate, the Montreal Royals, for whom he batted .302.

He then joined the Syracuse Chiefs of the International League, playing there from 1940 until being re-acquired by the Dodgers during the 1944 season in exchange for Bill Lohrman and Fritz Ostermueller.

With the Dodgers, he enjoyed the best year of his career in 1945, when he was voted an All-Star and finished 10th in voting for Most Valuable Player Award. He led the NL in batting during most of 1945. That season he had a .325 batting average (3rd in NL), 197 hits (2nd), 126 runs (2nd), 11 triples (3rd), 606 at-bats (6th) and a .460 slugging percentage (6th), a .379 on-base percentage (9th), 14 sacrifice hits (10th), 12 home runs and 19 outfield assists.

In that season, he also had the distinction of being the fourth Canadian-born major leaguer to be named to the All-Star Game, after George Selkirk (1936 and 1939), Oscar Judd (1943) and, Jeff Heath who was also named to the 1945 All-Star game after two previous appearances (1941 and 1943).

Three games into the 1946 season, Rosen was traded to the Dodgers' cross-town rivals, the New York Giants. It would be his last year in the major leagues. That year he suffered a career-ending clavicle injury upon crashing into a fence. Before the end of the season, he was sent down to the Jersey City Giants of the International League.

In 551 games in six seasons, Rosen posted a .291 batting average (557-for-1916) with 310 runs, 71 doubles, 34 triples, 22 home runs, 197 runs batted in, 218 bases on balls, .364 on-base percentage and, .398 slugging percentage. He finished his career with a .989 fielding percentage playing at all three outfield positions.

Rosen rejected an offer from Jersey City to return in 1947 and said he would only continue to play if he were sent to Toronto, where he had opened a restaurant. The deal was made, and Rosen played for the Toronto Maple Leafs of the International League in 1947. After a season in which he batted .274/.397/.369, he was given an unconditional release, ending his professional baseball career.

== Toronto softball, Ontario baseball ==
In 1948, Rosen switched to softball, playing for the Daltons in the Toronto Ki-Y (Kiwanis-YMCA) senior league and then joining the Levys in the Beaches Fastball League, winning the league championship in 1949. Rosen started the 1950 season playing for the world champion Tip Top Tailors team in the Beaches League but then returned to baseball as player-manager of the Galt Terriers of the Intercounty Baseball League. He was named manager of the Ontario all-star team that played the Intercounty Maple Leafs in an exhibition game in August. Rosen returned to softball and the Beaches League in 1951, playing for Peoples Credit Jewellers, then officially retired.

After his retirement he owned and ran the Dunsway Restaurant in Toronto at Bloor and Dundas Streets for a time. He was also a business executive with a major Canadian brewery, John Labatt Limited, in their sales staff and was still so popular in baseball circles he was answering around 2,000 pieces of fan mail annually in his later years. He died of pneumonia in Toronto's Sunnybrook Hospital on April 6, 1994, at age 81 and was buried at Beth Tzedec Memorial Park.

== Achievements ==
Rosen was inducted into the Canadian Baseball Hall of Fame in 1984 in its second year.

His .291 career batting average was eighth-best of all Jewish major leaguers, through 2010. He held the distinction of being the only Jewish-Canadian major leaguer for almost 70 years until London, Ontario-born Adam Stern suited up for the Boston Red Sox.

== See also ==
- List of Jewish Major League Baseball players
