= Frank Wurm =

American baseball player (1924-1993)

- Pitcher
- Born: April 27, 1924; Cambridge, New York, U.S.
- Died: September 19, 1993 (aged 69); Glens Falls, New York, U.S.
- Batted: Switch Threw: Left

MLB debut
- September 4, 1944, for the Brooklyn Dodgers

Last MLB appearance
- September 4, 1944, for the Brooklyn Dodgers

MLB statistics
- Win–loss record: 0–0
- Earned run average: 108.00
- Strikeouts: 1
- Stats at Baseball Reference

Teams
- Brooklyn Dodgers (1944)

Frank James Wurm (April 27, 1924 – September 19, 1993) was an American professional baseball pitcher.

Wurm grew up in Salem, New York and attended Salem Central School. In September 1941, he signed a contract with the Brooklyn Dodgers and began pitching in their farm system. At age 18 in 1942, he pitched for the Olean Oilers and tied the PONY League record for strikeouts in a game. The following February, he was inducted into the United States Army and was shipped out to Sicily by the summer. According to the Brooklyn Daily Eagle, Wurm, then 19 years old, "was one of the first Americans to enter Cassino" but was medically discharged shortly thereafter due to "battle fatigue." He described a friend and fellow soldier dying in his arms after they were both hit by a German artillery shell.

He appeared in one game in Major League Baseball for the Brooklyn Dodgers during the 1944 season. He started the game, giving up four runs while only getting one out, a strikeout.

By 1945, he was a member of the men's basketball team at Middlebury College in Vermont. He eventually captained that team.

After a brief return to the minors in 1946, Wurm voluntarily retired from baseball due to arm injuries.

In July 1967, Wurm, then living in Lake George, New York, was hired as an area scout for the Pittsburgh Pirates.

Born in Cambridge, New York, Wurm died in Glens Falls, New York.
