= Red Durrett =

American baseball player (1921-1992)

- Outfielder
- Born: February 3, 1921; Sherman, Texas, U.S.
- Died: January 17, 1992 (aged 70); Waxahachie, Texas, U.S.
- Batted: Left Threw: Left

MLB debut
- September 14, 1944, for the Brooklyn Dodgers

Last MLB appearance
- May 2, 1945, for the Brooklyn Dodgers

MLB statistics
- Batting average: .146
- Home runs: 1
- Runs: 5
- Stats at Baseball Reference

Teams
- Brooklyn Dodgers (1944–1945)

Elmer Cable "Red" Durrett (February 3, 1921 – January 17, 1992) was an American outfielder in Major League Baseball who played for the Brooklyn Dodgers during the 1944 and 1945 seasons. Born in Sherman, Texas, he died at age 70 in Waxahachie, Texas.
