= Stan Andrews =

American baseball player

- Catcher
- Born: April 17, 1917; Lynn, Massachusetts, U.S.
- Died: June 10, 1995 (aged 78); Bradenton, Florida, U.S.
- Batted: Right Threw: Right

MLB debut
- June 11, 1939, for the Boston Bees

Last MLB appearance
- September 30, 1945, for the Philadelphia Phillies

MLB statistics
- Batting average: .215
- Home runs: 1
- Hits: 32
- Stats at Baseball Reference

Teams
- Boston Bees (1939–1940); Brooklyn Dodgers (1944–1945); Philadelphia Phillies (1945)

Stan Andrews (April 17, 1917 – June 10, 1995) was an American professional baseball catcher who played from 1939 to 1945 for the Boston Bees, Brooklyn Dodgers and Philadelphia Phillies.
