= Fats Dantonio =

American baseball player (1918–1993)

- Catcher
- Born: December 31, 1918; New Orleans, Louisiana, U.S.
- Died: May 28, 1993 (aged 74); New Orleans, Louisiana, U.S.
- Batted: Right Threw: Right

MLB debut
- September 18, 1944, for the Brooklyn Dodgers

Last MLB appearance
- September 20, 1945, for the Brooklyn Dodgers

MLB statistics
- Batting average: .244
- Home runs: 0
- Runs scored: 12
- Stats at Baseball Reference

Teams
- Brooklyn Dodgers (1944–1945)

John James "Fats" Dantonio (December 31, 1918 – May 28, 1993) was an American Major League Baseball catcher for the Brooklyn Dodgers in 1944 and 1945. "Fats" was 5 ft 8 in (1.73 m) tall and weighed only 165 pounds.

Dantonio is one of many ballplayers who only appeared in the major leagues during World War II. He made his major league debut on September 18, 1944, in a road game against the Boston Braves at Braves Field.

He played in just 3 games in '44, then batted .250 in 47 games the next season. His career totals for 50 games include a .244 batting average (33-for-135), 12 runs batted in, 12 runs scored, a .301 on-base percentage, and a .304 slugging percentage. As a receiver he was well below average, making 14 errors in 182 total chances for a low fielding percentage of .923.

Dantonio died in his hometown of New Orleans, Louisiana, at the age of 74.
