= Art Herring =

American baseball player (1906–1995)

- Pitcher
- Born: March 10, 1906; Altus, Oklahoma, U.S.
- Died: December 2, 1995 (aged 89); Marion, Indiana, U.S.
- Batted: Right Threw: Right

MLB debut
- September 12, 1929, for the Detroit Tigers

Last MLB appearance
- June 15, 1947, for the Pittsburgh Pirates

MLB statistics
- Win–loss record: 34–38
- Earned run average: 4.32
- Strikeouts: 243
- Stats at Baseball Reference

Teams
- Detroit Tigers (1929–1933); Brooklyn Dodgers (1934); Chicago White Sox (1939); Brooklyn Dodgers (1944–1946); Pittsburgh Pirates (1947)

Arthur L. Herring (March 10, 1906 – December 2, 1995) was an American professional baseball pitcher for the Detroit Tigers (1929–33), Brooklyn Dodgers (1934 and 1944–47), Chicago White Sox (1939) and Pittsburgh Pirates (1947) of Major League Baseball.

Herring led the American League in hit batsmen (8) in 1931.

In 11 seasons, Herring had a 34–38 win–loss record, 199 games pitched (56 started), 25 complete games, 3 shutouts, 80 games finished, 13 saves, 697 2/3 innings pitched, 754 hits allowed, 401 runs allowed, 335 earned runs allowed, 40 home runs allowed, 284 walks allowed, 243 strikeouts, 20 hit batsmen, 7 wild pitches, 3,097 batters faced and a 4.32 ERA.

Herring died in Marion, Indiana, at the age of 89.
