= Tommy Brown (baseball) =

American baseball player (1927–2025)

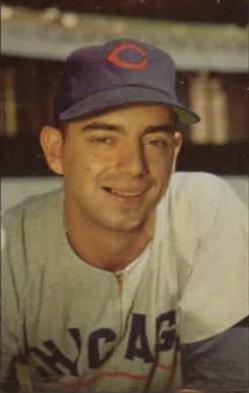
- Brown with the Cubs, c. 1953
- Utility player
- Born: December 6, 1927; New York City, U.S.
- Died: January 15, 2025 (aged 97); Altamonte Springs, Florida, U.S.
- Batted: Right Threw: Right

MLB debut
- August 3, 1944, for the Brooklyn Dodgers

Last MLB appearance
- September 25, 1953, for the Chicago Cubs

MLB statistics
- Batting average: .241
- Home runs: 31
- Run batted in: 159
- Stats at Baseball Reference

Teams
- Brooklyn Dodgers (1944–1945, 1947–1951); Philadelphia Phillies (1951–1952); Chicago Cubs (1952–1953)

Career highlights and awards
- MLB records: Youngest player to hit a home run in a game: 17 years, 257 days old (on August 20, 1945)

Thomas Michael Brown (December 6, 1927 – January 15, 2025), nicknamed "Buckshot", was an American professional baseball player. He made his Major League Baseball (MLB) debut with his hometown Brooklyn Dodgers at 16 years and 241 days old, starting at shortstop at Ebbets Field against the Chicago Cubs, on August 3, 1944, during the World War II manpower shortage. Brown thus became the youngest non-pitcher to ever play in a major league game, and the second-youngest overall after Joe Nuxhall, who was 15 years and 316 days old when he first appeared as a hurler for the Cincinnati Reds on June 10, 1944. In Brown's debut game, he collected his first big-league hit, a double off the Cubs' Bob Chipman, and in the field handled three chances, with one error, as the Dodgers fell, 6–2.

On August 20, 1945, at 17 years and 257 days old, Brown became the youngest player in MLB history to hit a home run, a record that still stands.

== Background ==
Thomas Michael Brown was born on December 6, 1927, in Bensonhurst, Brooklyn. He dropped out of school when he was twelve years old and started working with his uncle, a dockworker.

== Baseball career ==
Brown signed with the Dodgers after a 1943 tryout and spent the first four months of the 1944 season with Newport News of the Class B Piedmont League; while there, Brown collected 101 hits and a league-leading 11 triples, and batted .297 before his recall to Brooklyn in August. He appeared in 46 games for the Dodgers through the end of that season.

The next season, in a game against the Pittsburgh Pirates on August 20, 1945, Brown became the youngest player in MLB history to hit a home run, a record that still stands. He was 17 years and 257 days old at the time, and the solo home run was against Preacher Roe in the bottom of the 7th inning in what turned out to be a blowout 11–1 Pirates victory, with Brown's solo shot representing the Dodgers' only run of the game. Five days later, on August 25, 1945, Brown hit another home run, this time off of New York Giants pitcher Adrián Zabala in the first game of a doubleheader. His home run was once again in the bottom of the 7th inning, and once again it was a solo shot; however, the Dodgers were victorious in this contest, winning 8-6. At 17 years and 262 days old, Brown became the second youngest player to hit a home run, behind only himself five days earlier. These were the only two home runs Brown hit in 1945, finishing with a .245/.267/.332 slash line and 19 runs batted in (RBI).

Brown spent 1946 in the United States Army, then in 1947, the second postwar season, returned to a Dodgers team with a set lineup that included Baseball Hall of Fame shortstop Pee Wee Reese. He became a utility man for the remainder of his MLB career, appearing in 166 games as a shortstop, 94 as an outfielder, 50 as a third baseman, 24 as a second baseman, and 21 as a first baseman. The Dodgers traded Brown to the Philadelphia Phillies in June 1951, and the Phils sold his contract to the Chicago Cubs a little more than a year later.

As a hitter, Brown batted over .300 twice in part-time duty (1949 and 1952). On September 18, 1950, against the Cubs at Ebbets Field, Brown hit three home runs and a single, with a base on balls, in five plate appearances, scoring three runs and collecting five RBIs. The Dodgers, however, lost the game, 9–7.

Brown's big-league career came to an end September 25, 1953, as a member of the Cubs; he had played in 494 games during all or parts of nine National League (NL) seasons, and was 25 years of age. Brown's 309 MLB hits included 39 doubles, seven triples, and 31 homers. He hit .241 lifetime with 159 runs batted in. Brown appeared as a pinch hitter in the 1949 World Series and went hitless in two at bats, as Brooklyn fell to the New York Yankees in five games. He played minor league baseball through 1959, including with the Nashville Vols, before retiring.

== Later life ==
After his playing days ended, Brown lived in Brentwood, Tennessee, where he worked at a Ford plant until his retirement in 1993. In retirement, he lived in Brentwood and Altamonte Springs, Florida.

== Personal life and death ==
Brown was married and had four children. He died from complications of a fall at a rehabilitation facility in Altamonte Springs on January 15, 2025, at the age of 97. At the time of his death, Brown was one of four major league players still living who played during the 1940s decade (the others being Bobby Shantz, Bill Greason, and Ron Teasley), and the last living player who played in the majors before the end of World War 2.
