= Mike Sandlock =

American baseball player (1915–2016)

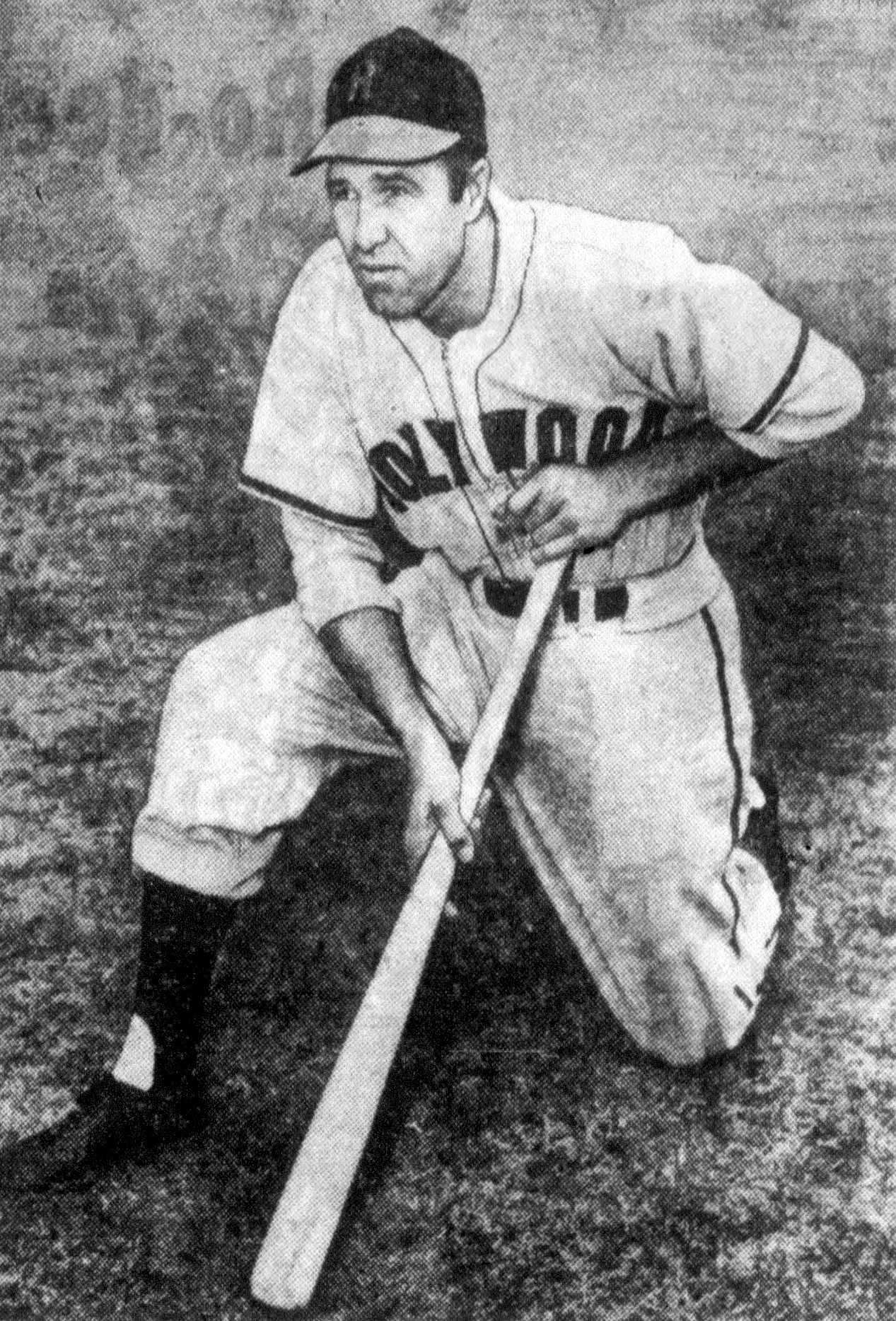
- Sandlock, circa 1949
- Catcher
- Born: October 17, 1915; Old Greenwich, Connecticut, U.S.
- Died: April 4, 2016 (aged 100); Cos Cob, Connecticut, U.S.
- Batted: Switch Threw: Right

MLB debut
- September 19, 1942, for the Boston Braves

Last MLB appearance
- September 27, 1953, for the Pittsburgh Pirates

MLB statistics
- Batting average: .240
- Home runs: 2
- Runs batted in: 31
- Stats at Baseball Reference

Teams
- Boston Braves (1942, 1944); Brooklyn Dodgers (1945–1946); Pittsburgh Pirates (1953)

Michael Joseph Sandlock (October 17, 1915 – April 4, 2016) was an American professional baseball utility player who played in Major League Baseball from 1942 to 1953. He played for the Boston Braves, Brooklyn Dodgers and Pittsburgh Pirates. Listed at 6 ft 1 in (1.85 m), 180 lb., he was a switch-hitter and threw right-handed. From the death of Connie Marrero on April 23, 2014, until his own death on April 4, 2016, Sandlock was the oldest living former major league player. That distinction was passed on to Eddie Carnett.

== Early life ==
Sandlock was born in Old Greenwich, Connecticut, to parents who were Polish immigrants. As a teenager, Sandlock dreamed of playing professional baseball after he attended a game at Yankee Stadium and Babe Ruth hit a home run over his head. He served as a batboy for the local fire department's baseball team. Sandlock did not attend high school, but he had some trade school training. He worked as an electrician and was making $200 per month when he quit to become a professional baseball player. He took a pay cut of more than 50% when he entered baseball.

== Career ==
Between 1938 and 1942, Sandlock was a minor league player in Huntington, West Virginia; Bradford, Pennsylvania; Hartford, Connecticut; and Evansville, Indiana. Chiefly a catcher, Sandlock also saw action at shortstop and at second and third base. Sandlock and Warren Spahn were roommates and they were called up together by the Braves in September 1942. Sandlock appeared in two games that year. He spent 1943 working in a munitions plant and playing for a touring USO team under manager Chuck Dressen. He returned to Boston before playing for the Brooklyn Dodgers in 1945–46. Sandlock's most productive season came in 1945 with Brooklyn, when he hit .282 with two home runs and 17 runs batted in in 80 games played, all career highs.

He also spent time in the Pacific Coast League (PCL) with the Hollywood Stars (1949–1952). The PCL was popular at the time since MLB had not yet reached the West Coast. Sandlock said that he made twice the amount of money with the Stars as he did in the major leagues, and he noted that the Stars' games were often attended by celebrities such as movie stars. With the Stars, Sandlock became adept at catching the knuckleball thrown by pitcher Johnny Lindell. The knuckleball's odd movement was notoriously difficult for catchers to handle. When Lindell's contract was purchased by the Pittsburgh Pirates for the 1953 season, Sandlock was promoted with him. The arrangement did not work well, as Lindell led the league in wild pitches (11) and Sandlock allowed a league-leading 15 passed balls in only 64 games.

After the 1953 season, Sandlock was purchased by the Philadelphia Phillies, but he did not return to the major leagues. He spent his final season in minor league baseball as the San Diego Padres won the 1954 PCL pennant. Over parts of five major league seasons, Sandlock was a .240 hitter (107-for-446) with two home runs and 31 RBI in 195 games, including 34 runs, 19 doubles, two triples, and two stolen bases.

== Later life ==
After retiring from baseball, Sandlock became a carpenter and handyman. He was an active golfer in his later life, winning several championships at his local golf club. He sometimes played with Jackie Robinson, whom he had befriended during spring training with Brooklyn in the 1940s. Sandlock was married to the former Victoria Suchocki for 42 years until she died in 1982. They had two sons and one daughter.

Sandlock turned 100 in October 2015, and died on April 4, 2016. At the time of his death, he was the oldest living former major league ballplayer.

== See also ==
- List of centenarians (Major League Baseball players)
- List of centenarians (sportspeople)

Records
Preceded by Connie Marrero	Oldest recognized verified living baseball player April 23, 2014 – April 4, 2016	Succeeded by Eddie Carnett
