= Augie Galan =

American baseball player, coach, and manager (1912–1993)

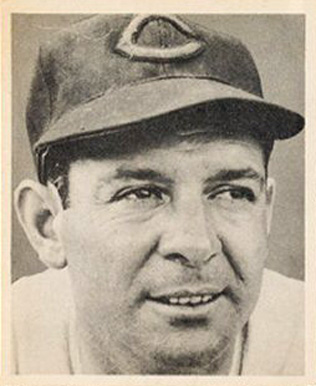
- Outfielder
- Born: May 23, 1912; Berkeley, California, U.S.
- Died: December 28, 1993 (aged 81); Fairfield, California, U.S.
- Batted: Switch Threw: Right

MLB debut
- April 29, 1934, for the Chicago Cubs

Last MLB appearance
- September 26, 1949, for the Philadelphia Athletics

MLB statistics
- Batting average: .287
- Home runs: 100
- Runs batted in: 830
- Stats at Baseball Reference

Teams
- Chicago Cubs (1934–1941); Brooklyn Dodgers (1941–1946); Cincinnati Reds (1947–1948); New York Giants (1949); Philadelphia Athletics (1949)

Career highlights and awards
- 3× All-Star (1936, 1943, 1944); 2× NL stolen base leader (1935, 1937)

August John Galan (May 23, 1912 – December 28, 1993) was an American professional baseball outfielder, manager and coach. He played 16 seasons in Major League Baseball (MLB) from 1934 to 1949 for the Chicago Cubs, Brooklyn Dodgers, Cincinnati Reds, New York Giants and Philadelphia Athletics. Galan threw right-handed and began his career as a switch hitter, however, starting in the latter part of 1943, he became strictly a left-handed hitter until the end of his career. He was listed as 6 feet (1.8 m) tall and 175 pounds (79 kg).

== Early life ==
Galan was born in Berkeley, California, one of eight children. His parents had emigrated from France in the late 19th century, and his father operated a French hand laundry on Berkeley’s University Avenue. At age 11, Augie Galan broke his right elbow playing sandlot ball. He concealed the injury from his parents, fearful of being barred from further play. The arm was never set, or healed improperly, and it was never fully healthy throughout Galan's professional career. He graduated from Berkeley High School.

== Minor leagues ==
Galan started in the Texas League and graduated from the San Francisco Seals of the Pacific Coast League in 1932. In 1933 he was PCL Most Valuable Player, and in 1934 was purchased by the Cubs.

== Major leagues ==
In a 16-season big-league career, Galan posted a .287 batting average with 1,706 hits, 100 home runs and 830 runs batted in in 1,742 games played. He twice led the National League in stolen bases, with 22 thefts in 1935 and 23 in 1937. He also led the NL in runs scored (133 in 1935) and bases on balls (103 in 1943 and 101 in 1944), and four times exceeded .800 in on-base plus slugging, each time finishing in the NL's top ten in that category.

In 1937, Galan was the first National Leaguer to hit home runs from both sides of the plate in a game. Galan was selected to three National League All-Star teams and homered off Schoolboy Rowe in the 1936 game to help power the NL to a 4–3 victory. He also played in three World Series (1935 and 1938 with the Cubs, and 1941 with the Dodgers), but his teams never won. Galan collected four fall classic hits in 29 total at bats (.138). He reached the .300 plateau in hitting six times.

In 1935, he became the first full-time player to make 649 plate appearances and not hit into a double play, though he hit into one triple play. That year, he led the National League with 133 runs scored. Often injured (he broke his knee in 1940), Galan had a deformed arm from a childhood injury. The knee injury eventually forced him to give up batting from the right side of the plate. These injuries also classified him as 4-F, rendering him unable to serve in World War II.

== Later years in baseball ==
After leaving the major leagues in 1949, Galan returned to the San Francisco Bay Area and played two more seasons with the Oakland Oaks of the Pacific Coast League, then managed the club to a 77–103 record (seventh place) in 1953. He joined the Philadelphia Athletics' coaching staff in 1954, their last year in that city, and went on to spend 17 years as a minor league coach and manager in the Athletics' organization.

== Personal life ==
Galan died in 1993 in Fairfield, California, at 81 years of age. He was survived by his wife of 40 years, Shirley, and four children.

== See also ==
- List of Major League Baseball career runs scored leaders
- List of Major League Baseball annual runs scored leaders
- List of Major League Baseball annual stolen base leaders

Sporting positions
Preceded by Mel Ott	Oakland Oaks manager 1953	Succeeded by Chuck Dressen
