= 2016 in baseball =

The following are the baseball events of the year 2016 throughout the world.

== Champions of United States baseball leagues ==
=== Major League Baseball ===
- World Series: Chicago Cubs
  - American League: Cleveland Indians
    - Eastern Division: Boston Red Sox
    - Central Division: Cleveland Indians
    - Western Division: Texas Rangers
    - Wild Card 1: Toronto Blue Jays
    - Wild Card 2: Baltimore Orioles
  - National League: Chicago Cubs
    - Eastern Division: Washington Nationals
    - Central Division: Chicago Cubs
    - Western Division: Los Angeles Dodgers
    - Wild Card 1: New York Mets
    - Wild Card 2: San Francisco Giants

Wild Card Game (ALWC, NLWC)
4	Toronto	1
5	Baltimore	0
4	NY Mets	0
5	San Francisco	1

Division Series (ALDS, NLDS)
1	Texas	0
4	Toronto	3
American League
2	Cleveland	3
3	Boston	0
1	Chicago Cubs	3
5	San Francisco	1
National League
2	Washington	2
3	LA Dodgers	3

League Championship Series (ALCS, NLCS)
4	Toronto	1
2	Cleveland	4
1	Chicago Cubs	4
3	LA Dodgers	2

World Series
AL2	Cleveland	3
NL1	Chicago Cubs	4

=== Other United States baseball leagues ===
- Minor League Baseball
  - AAA
    - Championship: Scranton/Wilkes-Barre RailRiders (New York Yankees)
      - International League: Scranton/Wilkes-Barre RailRiders (New York Yankees)
      - Pacific Coast League: El Paso Chihuahuas (San Diego Padres)
    - Mexican League: Pericos de Puebla
  - AA
    - Eastern League: Akron RubberDucks (Cleveland Indians)
    - Southern League: Jackson Generals (Seattle Mariners)
    - Texas League: Midland RockHounds (Oakland Athletics)
  - High A
    - California League: High Desert Mavericks (Texas Rangers)
    - Carolina League: Myrtle Beach Pelicans (Chicago Cubs)
    - Florida State League: Bradenton Marauders (Pittsburgh Pirates)
  - A
    - Midwest League: Great Lakes Loons (Los Angeles Dodgers)
    - South Atlantic League: Rome Braves (Atlanta Braves)
  - Short Season A
    - New York–Penn League: State College Spikes (St. Louis Cardinals)
    - Northwest League: Eugene Emeralds (Chicago Cubs)
  - Rookie
    - Appalachian League: Johnson City Cardinals (St. Louis Cardinals)
    - Arizona League: AZL Mariners (Seattle Mariners)
    - Dominican Summer League: DSL Red Sox (Boston Red Sox)
    - Gulf Coast League: GCL Cardinals (St. Louis Cardinals)
    - Pioneer League: Orem Owlz (Los Angeles Angels of Anaheim)
  - Arizona Fall League: Mesa Solar Sox (CHI/CLE/MIA/OAK/TOR)
- Independent baseball leagues
  - American Association: Winnipeg Goldeyes
  - Atlantic League: Sugar Land Skeeters
  - Can-Am League: Ottawa champions
  - Empire League: Sullivan Explorers
  - Frontier League: Evansville Otters
  - Pacific Association: Sonoma Stompers
  - Pecos League: Tucson Saguaros
  - United Shore League: Utica Unicorns
- Amateur
  - College
    - College World Series: Coastal Carolina
    - NCAA Division II: Nova Southeastern University
    - NCAA Division III: Trinity University
    - NAIA: Lewis-Clark State College
    - Junior College Baseball World Series: Yavapai College
    - Cape Cod Baseball League: Yarmouth–Dennis Red Sox
  - Youth
    - Big League World Series: Tao-Yuan County Big Little League (Taoyuan County, Taiwan)
    - Junior League World Series: Shing-Ming Little League (Taoyuan, Taiwan)
    - Intermediate League World Series: Central East Maui Little League (Wailuku, Hawaii)
    - Little League World Series: Maine-Endwell Little League (Maine-Endwell, New York)
    - Senior League World Series: Clear Ridge Little League (Chicago, Illinois)

== Champions of competitions outside the United States ==
- National teams
  - European Baseball Championship: Netherlands
  - Haarlem Baseball Week: Netherlands
  - 15U Baseball World Cup: Cuba
  - 23U Baseball World Cup: Japan
  - Women's Baseball World Cup: Japan
- International club team competitions
  - Caribbean Series : Venados de Mazatlán (Mexico)
  - European Cup: L&D Amsterdam (Netherlands)
  - World Baseball Challenge: Team Japan
- Domestic leagues
  - Australian Baseball League: Brisbane Bandits
  - British League: Southampton Mustangs
  - China Baseball League: Tianjin Lions
  - Cuban National Series: Ciego de Ávila
  - Dominican League: Leones del Escogido
  - Dutch Baseball League: DOOR Neptunus
  - French League: Rouen 76
  - Italian Baseball League: UnipolSai Bologna
  - Japan Series: Hokkaido Nippon-Ham Fighters
    - Pacific League: Hokkaido Nippon-Ham Fighters
    - Central League: Hiroshima Toyo Carp
  - Korean Series: Doosan Bears
  - Mexican Pacific League: Venados de Mazatlán
  - Puerto Rican League: Cangrejeros de Santurce
  - Spanish League: CBS Sant Boi
  - Taiwan Series: EDA Rhinos
  - Venezuelan League: Tigres de Aragua

== Awards and honors ==
=== Major League Baseball ===
- Baseball Hall of Fame honors
- MVP Award
  - American League: Mike Trout (LAA)
  - National League: Kris Bryant (CHC)
- Cy Young Award
  - American League: Rick Porcello (BOS)
  - National League: Max Scherzer (WSH)
- Rookie of the Year
  - American League: Michael Fulmer (DET)
  - National League: Corey Seager (LAD)
- Manager of the Year Award
  - American League: Terry Francona (CLE)
  - National League: Dave Roberts (LAD)

Major League Baseball awards

- World Series MVP: Ben Zobrist (CHC)
- League Championship Series MVP
  - American League: Andrew Miller (CLE)
  - National League: Javier Báez and Jon Lester (both CHC)
- All-Star Game MVP: Eric Hosmer (KC)
- Comeback Player of the Year: Rick Porcello (BOS); Anthony Rendon WSH)
- Reliever of the Year Award
  - American League: Zach Britton (BAL)
  - National League: Kenley Jansen (LAD)
- Babe Ruth Award: Jon Lester (CHC)
- Branch Rickey Award: Anthony Rizzo (CHC)
- Edgar Martínez Award: David Ortiz (BOS)
- Hank Aaron Award
  - American League: David Ortiz (BOS)
  - National League: Kris Bryant (CHC)
- Hutch Award: Dustin McGowan (MIA)
- Luis Aparicio Award: Jose Altuve (HOU)
- Roberto Clemente Award: Curtis Granderson (NYM)
- Tip O'Neill Award: Joey Votto (CIN)
- Tony Conigliaro Award: Yangervis Solarte (SD)
- Warren Spahn Award: Jon Lester (CHC)

Baseball America awards

- MLB Player of the Year: Mike Trout (LAA)
- MLB Rookie of the Year: Corey Seager (LAD)
- MLB Manager of the Year: Terry Francona (CLE)
- MLB Executive of the Year: Chris Antonetti (CLE)
- MLB Organization of the Year: Chicago Cubs

Sporting News awards

- Player of the Year Award: Jose Altuve (HOU)
- Starting pitcher of the Year Award
  - American League: Corey Kluber (CLE)
  - National League: Max Scherzer (WSH)
- Relief pitcher of the Year Award
  - American League: Zach Britton (NYY)
  - National League: Kenley Jansen (LAD)
- Rookie of the Year Award
  - American League: Michael Fulmer (CLE)
  - National League: Corey Seager (LAD)
- Comeback Player of the Year Award
  - American League: Mark Trumbo (BAL)
  - National League: José Fernandez (MIA)
- Manager of the Year Award
  - American League: Terry Francona (CLE)
  - National League: Dave Roberts (LAD)
- Executive of the Year Award: Theo Epstein (CHC)

Players Choice Awards

- Outstanding Players
  - American League: Jose Altuve (HOU)
  - National League: Daniel Murphy (NYM)
- Outstanding Pitchers
  - American League: Rick Porcello (BOS)
  - National League: Kyle Hendricks (CHC)
- Outstanding Rookies
  - American League: Michael Fulmer (DET)
  - National League: Corey Seager (LAD)
- Comeback Players of the Year
  - American League: Mark Trumbo (BAL)
  - National League: José Fernandez (MIA)
- Choice Man of the Year: Curtis Granderson (NYM)
- Choice Player of the Year: Jose Altuve (HOU)

Silver Slugger Awards

American League			National League
Player	Team	Position	Player	Team
Miguel Cabrera	(DET)	First baseman	Anthony Rizzo	(CHC)
Jose Altuve	(HOU)	Second baseman	Daniel Murphy	(NYM)
Josh Donaldson	(TOR)	Third baseman	Nolan Arenado	(COL)
Xander Bogaerts	(BOS)	Shortstop	Corey Seager	(LAD)
Mookie Betts	(BOS)	Outfielder	Charlie Blackmon	(COL)
Mike Trout	(LAA)	Outfielder	Yoenis Céspedes	(NYM)
Mark Trumbo	(BAL)	Outfielder	Christian Yelich	(MIA)
Salvador Pérez	(KC)	Catcher	Wilson Ramos	(WSH)
David Ortiz	(BOS)	Designated hitter/pitcher	Jake Arrieta	(CHC)

Gold Glove Awards

American League			National League
Player	Team	Position	Player	Team
Mitch Moreland	(TEX)	First baseman	Anthony Rizzo *	(CHC)
Ian Kinsler	(DET)	Second baseman	Joe Panik	(SF)
Adrián Beltré	(TEX)	Third baseman	Nolan Arenado	(COL)
Francisco Lindor *	(CLE)	Shortstop	Brandon Crawford	(SF)
Brett Gardner	(NYY)	Left fielder	Starling Marte	(PIT)
Kevin Kiermaier	(TB)	Center fielder	Ender Inciarte	(ATL)
Mookie Betts	(BOS)	Right fielder	Jason Heyward	(CHC)
Salvador Pérez	(KC)	Catcher	Buster Posey	(SF)
Dallas Keuchel	(HOU)	Pitcher	Zack Greinke	(LAD)

* Platinum Glove Award Winner

=== Minor League Baseball ===
- International League MVP: Ben Gamel (Scranton/Wilkes-Barre [NYY])
- Pacific Coast League MVP: Hunter Renfroe (El Paso [SD])
- Eastern League MVP: Dylan Cozens (Reading [PHI])
- Southern League MVP: Tyler O'Neill (Jackson [SEA])
- Texas League Player of the Year: Matt Chapman (Midland [SEA])
- Baseball America MiLB Rookie of the Year: Yoan Moncada (Salem, Portland [BOS])
- Joe Bauman Home Run Award: Dylan Cozens (Reading [PHI])
- Dernell Stenson Sportsmanship Award: Austin Nola (Mesa Solar Sox [MIA])
- Joe Black Award: Gleyber Torres (Scottsdale Scorpions [NYY])
- Larry Doby Award: Yoan Moncada (BOS)
- USA Today MiLB Player of the Year: Alex Bregman (Corpus Christi, Fresno [HOU])

=== College ===
- Baseball America College Player of the Year: Kyle Lewis (Mercer)
- Baseball America College Coach of the Year: Jim Schlossnagle (TCU)
- Baseball America Freshman of the Year: Seth Beer (Clemson)

== Events ==
=== January ===
- January 6 – Ken Griffey Jr. and Mike Piazza are elected to the Hall of Fame by the Baseball Writers' Association of America. In his first year on the ballot, Griffey receives a record 99.3 percent of the vote, being named on all but three of the 440 ballots, to surpass the 98.84 percent Tom Seaver received in 1992. Piazza, in his fourth year on the ballot, receives 83.0 percent of the votes, up from the 69.9 percent he received in 2015. Griffey becomes the first player drafted #1 overall (1987) to be inducted into the Hall of Fame, while Piazza becomes the lowest draftee to be inducted, having been selected in the 62nd round, 1390th overall (1988). A player needs 75 percent to gain election. This time, the vote total dropped by 109 from last year, due to the new rules writers who have not been active for 10 years lost their votes. Falling shy of enshrinement was Jeff Bagwell (71.6%). The other players to be named on more than half the 440 ballots were Tim Raines (69.8%), Trevor Hoffman (67.3%) and Curt Schilling (52.3%).

=== February ===
- February 12 – Relief pitcher Jenrry Mejía of the New York Mets is permanently banned from Major League Baseball for a third failed drug test. Mejía had received an 80-game suspension in April, 2015 after testing positive for use of stanozolol. On July 28, three weeks after serving the suspension, he failed a test for stanozolol again as well as boldenone, and was suspended for 162 games. Mejía is allowed to apply for reinstatement after one year of the ban, but must be out of Major League Baseball for a minimum of two years if he is to be reinstated.

=== March ===
- March 15 – The United States Department of the Treasury announced that American employers would be allowed to hire Cuban citizens to work in the United States. This announcement theoretically means that Major League Baseball teams would be able to sign Cuban baseball players directly instead of requiring them to defect from Cuba and establish residence in another country before signing.

=== April ===
- April 5 – At Petco Park, the Los Angeles Dodgers defeat the San Diego Padres 15–0 in the most lopsided shutout on Opening Day. According to STATS, the previous record was the Pittsburgh Pirates' 14–0 victory over the Cincinnati Reds in 1911. The game also marks the managerial debut of the Dodgers' Dave Roberts, a former Dodger and Padre player and San Diego coach for the previous five seasons, as well as Andy Green guiding the Padres, resulting in the first Opening Day meeting of two rookie managers since Florida's Fredi González and Washington's Manny Acta in 2007.
- April 8 :
  - At Coors Field, rookie Trevor Story of the Colorado Rockies becomes the fifth player in Major League history to hit home runs in each of his team's first four games of a season. He hits two home runs, his fifth and sixth of the season, in the Rockies' 13–6 loss to the San Diego Padres, off starter Colin Rea in the fourth inning and reliever Ryan Buchter in the ninth. Story, who had already made history by becoming the first player to hit two home runs in his Major League debut in an Opening Day game, and hit three in each of his first three Major League games, joins Willie Mays (1971), Mark McGwire (1998), Nelson Cruz (2011) and Chris Davis (2013) as players who have homered in each of their team's first four games of a season. He also breaks the record of five home runs in his team's first four games, held jointly by Lou Brock in 1967 and Barry Bonds in 2002.
  - The St. Louis Cardinals became the first team in Major League Baseball history to have three players come off the bench to go deep in the same game. Jeremy Hazelbaker, Aledmys Díaz and Greg Garcia pinch-hit solo home runs in the final three innings, as the Cardinals prevailed with a 7–4 win over the Atlanta Braves at Turner Field.
- April 21 – At Great American Ball Park, Jake Arrieta of the Chicago Cubs no-hits the Cincinnati Reds 16–0. He walks four and strikes out six and is backed by five home runs: two by Kris Bryant, including a grand slam, and one each by Ben Zobrist, Anthony Rizzo and Arrieta's catcher, David Ross. Arrieta, who no-hit the Los Angeles Dodgers on August 30, 2015, joins Ken Holtzman as the only Cubs pitchers to throw multiple no-hitters in modern history. The Arrieta no-hitter is also the first against the Reds in regular season play since the Philadelphia Phillies' Rick Wise on June 23, 1971, though Roy Halladay had no-hit them during the 2010 National League Division Series. It also sets a modern-day record for most lopsided score in a no-hitter, topping the 15–0 score in Frank Smith's no-hitter on September 6, 1905. Previously, Pud Galvin had pitched an 18–0 no-hitter on August 4, 1884.
- August 26 – Andrew McCutchen hit three home runs for the second time of his career to lead the Pittsburgh Pirates to a 9–4 victory over the Colorado Rockies at Petco Park. As a result, McCutchen is only the fourth player in Pirates history with a pair of three-homer games, being the others Hall of Famers Ralph Kiner, Roberto Clemente and Willie Stargell.
- April 29 – At Chase Field, Colorado Rockies shortstop Trevor Story hit his 10th home run of the season, tying the Major League Baseball rookie record for most home runs in the month of April, set by Chicago White Sox slugger José Abreu in 2014. Story belted a two-run shot off pitcher Robbie Ray in the fifth inning, helping the Rockies cruise to a 9–0 victory over the Arizona Diamondbacks. In hitting his 10th home run in 21 games, Story tied Boston Red Sox first baseman George Scott in 1966 as the fastest player in major league history to reach that home run total.

=== May ===
- May 6 – David Ortiz hit a two-run home run off Michael Pineda in the first inning for a 2–0 Boston Red Sox lead over the New York Yankees that was a milestone blast. It was home run No. 510 in Ortiz's career, moving him past Gary Sheffield and into 25th place on the all-time list. It was also the No. 452 home run for Ortiz in a Red Sox uniform, tying him with Hall of Famer Carl Yastrzemski for second in team history. Only the legendary Ted Williams has hit more homers (521) in a Boston uniform. Besides, the long ball was Ortiz's 50th all-time against the Yankees, placing him sixth all-time in that category, behind Jimmie Foxx (70), Williams (62), Manny Ramírez (55), Hank Greenberg (53) and Yastrzemski (52). But it was not enough to propel Boston to a victory, as Rick Porcello gave up a home run to Yankees outfielder Aaron Hicks in the bottom of the seventh that snapped a 2–2 tie and sent the Sox to a 3–2 defeat at Yankee Stadium. Next up on the career home run list for Ortiz is former New York Giants great Mel Ott, who ranks 24th with 511 homers.
- May 7 – Bartolo Colón hit his first Major League career home run at Petco Park, a two-run shot off the San Diego Padres' James Shields. It took Colón until the age of 42 to achieve the long-ball feat, which traveled 365 feet, making him the oldest player in major league history to finally break through with a home run, according to the Elias Sports Bureau. Previously, 40-year-old Randy Johnson belted his first homer in Milwaukee on September 19, 2003. At 42 years, 349 days, Colón also became the second-oldest New York Mets player to hit a homer. Julio Franco homered for the Mets on May 4, 2007, when he was 48 years, 254 days old. Furthermore, Colón pitched 6 2/3 solid innings of three-run, six hits ball and struck out six in the 6–3 victory against San Diego.
- May 11 – At Nationals Park, Max Scherzer of the Washington Nationals ties a nine-inning Major League record by striking out 20 Detroit Tigers in the Nationals' 3–2 victory. After striking out Justin Upton for the second out of the ninth inning, Scherzer, who had pitched for the Tigers from 2010 to 2014, comes within one strikeout of tying the all-time record set by Tom Cheney in 1962 (Cheney, while with the Washington Senators, struck out 21 Baltimore Orioles in 16 innings). However, James McCann, who had already struck out three times, grounds out for the final out. Scherzer ties the nine inning record shared by Roger Clemens (twice, in 1986 and 1996), Kerry Wood (1998) and Randy Johnson (2001, in a game that lasted 11 innings).
- May 15 - The Toronto Blue Jays and Texas Rangers game devolves into chaos in the top of the eighth inning. First, Rangers pitcher Matt Bush throws a beanball at Blue Jays outfielder Jose Bautista (presumably as retribution for Bautista's bat flip in the previous season's American League Division Series). Bautista then slid hard into second baseman Rougned Odor in an attempt to break up a double play, which triggered a fight where Odor managed to punch Bautista squarely in the jaw. Both players, plus Blue Jays third baseman Josh Donaldson and a coach, were promptly ejected from the game. They were quickly joined by Blue Jays pitcher Jesse Chavez and coach DeMarlo Hale in the bottom of the eighth when Chavez hit Rangers player Prince Fielder with a pitch.
- May 17 – Off to one of the worst starts in their history, the Atlanta Braves dismissed manager Fredi González. The Braves dropped to an MLB-worst 9–28 record after an 8–5 loss to the Pittsburgh Pirates. Brian Snitker, manager of Atlanta's Triple-A Gwinnett Braves, replaced González as the team interim manager through the end of the season. González was at the helm from 2011 and compiled an overall record of 434–413 during his tenure as Atlanta's skipper. He remained a loyal contributor as his rosters were weakened by the massive rebuild the Braves began last year, as they fell shy of expectations in 2014 and have not posted an average of .500 since. The Braves also dismissed bench coach Carlos Tosca, who had served in that capacity for González dating back to their time together with the Florida Marlins from 2007 to 2010. Terry Pendleton became the bench coach, while his previous duties as first-base coach were filled by Eddie Pérez.
- May 20- It is announced that the 2019 season will be the Texas Rangers last season at Globe Life Park with Globe Life Field scheduled to open in time for the 2020 season. The Rangers have cited heat as the reason for low attendance at Globe Life Park.
- May 28 - In the third inning of the game between the Los Angeles Dodgers and New York Mets, Mets pitcher Noah Syndergaard is ejected for attempting to throw a beanball at Dodgers infielder Chase Utley (presumably as retribution for Utley's slide into Mets shortstop Ruben Tejada in Game 2 of the previous year's National League Division Series). Umpire Tom Hallion then got into an argument with Mets manager Terry Collins, which a fan recorded and would leak to the public. The video of the argument went viral, in particular the part where Hallion said "our ass is in the jackpot" in trying to explain the reasoning for Syndergaard's ejection.
- May 31 – Boston Red Sox right fielder Mookie Betts belted three home runs, one to each field, and drove in five runs in a 6–2 victory over the Baltimore Orioles at Camden Yards. Betts opened the game with a home run to center field, added a three-run shot in the second inning over the fence down the left-field line, and a solo homer to right field in the seventh for his first three-homer career game. Betts also impressed in the field with a dazzling diving catch in right-center field, robbing Paul Janish of an extra-base hit in the seventh. In addition, Betts became the first Red Sox leadoff hitter to go deep three times in one game, according to research by Elias Sports Bureau.

=== June ===
- June 2 – At Petco Park, the Seattle Mariners set a franchise record by erasing a 10-run deficit to defeat the San Diego Padres, 16–13. Trailing 12–2 after five innings, the Mariners score five runs in the sixth, then nine in the seventh, recording seven straight singles with two out in the latter inning. Their previous comeback record was an eight-run deficit, which they overcame to defeat the Anaheim Angels 11–10 on April 15, 1996.
- June 15 – At Petco Park, Ichiro Suzuki of the Miami Marlins collects two hits to give him 4,257 in his career combined in the Nippon Professional Baseball and Major League Baseball, surpassing Pete Rose who is the all-time MLB leader with 4,256 hits. After beating out an infield single in the first inning of the Marlins' 6–3 loss to the San Diego Padres, Suzuki doubles in the ninth inning for the record-breaking hit. The two hits give Suzuki 2,979 in his Major League career; he had collected 1,278 while in Japan's Pacific League.
- June 17 – David Ortiz hit his 521st career home run in an 8–4 loss to the Seattle Mariners at Fenway Park. With his fourth-inning solo home run against pitcher Hisashi Iwakuma, Ortiz tied Hall of Famers Willie McCovey, Frank Thomas and Ted Williams for 19th place on the all-time list. At his present pace, Ortiz also could catch Jimmie Foxx (534) and even Mickey Mantle (536) on the MLB's most home runs list.
- June 27 – Kris Bryant hit three home runs with two doubles and drove in six runs, leading the Chicago Cubs to an 11–8 victory over the Cincinnati Reds at Great American Ball Park. Bryant became the first player in MLB history to hit three homers and two doubles in a single game, as his 16 total bases also were a Chicago Cubs record, breaking the previous team's mark of 14 shared by Ernie Banks (1962), George Mitterwald (1974) and Aramis Ramírez (2004). Cubs starter Jake Arrieta gave up five runs and five walks in five innings but still was credited with the win.
- June 29 – The Sonoma Stompers signed female pitchers Stacy Piagno and Kelsie Whitmore, making the Stompers the first professional baseball club since the 1950s to have women take the field, when Mamie Johnson, Constance Morgan and Toni Stone became the first women to play along men in the Negro leagues. Sonoma, a member of the independent Pacific Association of Professional Baseball Clubs, previously made international news when they signed pitcher Sean Conroy, who became the first openly gay player to ever play baseball at the professional level.
- June 30 :
  - The Coastal Carolina Chanticleers won the College World Series (CWS) at TD Ameritrade Park in Omaha, Nebraska, defeating the Arizona Wildcats, 4–3, in the deciding game of the best-of-three championship series. Chanticleers pitcher Andrew Beckwith was named the Most Outstanding Player of the CWS, while Coastal became the first team since the Minnesota Golden Gophers in 1956 to win the CWS in its first appearance in the event. The championship, the first national title for Coastal Carolina and also the first for the Big South Conference in any team sport, took place the day before Coastal joined the Sun Belt Conference.
  - Carlos Carrasco struck out a season-high 14, while Jason Kipnis and Rajai Davis hit solo home runs, and the Cleveland Indians matched a franchise record by winning their 13th consecutive game of the season, beating the Toronto Blue Jays, 4–1, at Rogers Centre. The 13-win streak is the longest by any MLB team in the season, as well as the longest for the Indians since they won 13 straight in August 1951. Cleveland had also won 13 in a row between April and May 1942.

=== July ===
- July 1 – Major League Baseball imposed unprecedented penalties on the Boston Red Sox organization for rules violations relating to their acquisition of several international amateur free agents for the 2016–17 period. Boston was limited last year to spending a maximum of $300,000 on international amateur talent after exceeding its spending limit near the end of the 2014–15 signing period by spending $62 million on Cuban prospect Yoan Moncada. Furthermore, Boston circumvented that limitation by packaging more premium prospects with lesser prospects, paying $300K for multiple prospects that employed the same trainers/agents and then allowing the players' representatives to divide the share of the collective sums to the top five prospect of the package, with the lesser prospects receiving a smaller portion of the money during the 2015–16 period. The five players declared free agents were pitcher César González, outfielder Albert Guaimaro, catcher Simon Muzziotti, and infielders Antonio Piñero and Eduardo Torrealba. As a result, they became free agents and were free to sign with other clubs, though each player will retain the initial bonus money he received from Boston. In addition, they will be required to hire new agents before they sign. As for the Red Sox, they will still be able to sign pool-exempt international players, but such players will be the only types of free agents able to be signed to contracts until next July 2, when the 2017–18 international signing period begins.
- July 2 – The Cleveland Indians ended their franchise-record winning streak at 14 games with a 9–6 loss to the Toronto Blue Jays at Rogers Centre. Cleveland suffered its first loss since June 15 to the Kansas City Royals. Along the way, the Indians swept the Chicago White Sox, Tampa Bay Rays, Detroit Tigers and Atlanta Braves three times a piece, before taking the first two games from Toronto. The 14-game winning streak of the Indians was the longest in the American League since the Oakland Athletics won 20 consecutive games during the 2002 season. Josh Donaldson hit a go-ahead RBI single, as part of a three-run rally by Toronto in the bottom of the eight inning. Rajai Davis, who became the eighth Indians player to hit for the cycle, was also only the sixth player in MLB history to accomplish the feat in reverse fashion (home run first, then triple, double and single).
- July 3 – Major League Baseball celebrates military appreciation day by staging a regular season game at Fort Bragg, North Carolina, the largest military base in the United States with more than 50,000 active duty personnel. The Florida Marlins defeat the Atlanta Braves, 5–2, in a temporary 12,500 seat ballpark with no paid admission, as all spectators are active servicemen and servicewomen and their families. It is the first professional contest of any sport to be played on an active U.S. military installation. Construction on the field began four months before the game, even though the ballpark will be torn down starting in a few days. Seating will be removed, but the playing surface, along with the foul poles, dugouts and bullpens will remain, because there are plans to convert the site into softball and multipurpose recreational facilities for use of those on the base.
- July 6 – David Ortiz hit his 20th home run of the season, a two-run shot off Texas Rangers pitcher Martín Pérez in an 11–6 Boston Red Sox win at Fenway Park. It was his 523rd career homer, which also joined him with Babe Ruth, Hank Aaron, Willie Mays, Barry Bonds and Alex Rodríguez, as the only players in MLB history to hit at least 20 homers in 15 straight seasons or more. Ortiz has hit over 20 home runs in each of his 14 seasons for the Red Sox and belted exactly 20 in his final year with the Minnesota Twins in 2002.
- July 10 – In the All-Star Futures Game, Boston Red Sox prospect Yoan Moncada delivered an upper-deck, two-run home run off Arizona Diamondbacks prospect Anthony Banda, to give the World team 4–3 lead over the U.S. team in the eighth inning. After taking the lead, the World team scored seven more runs in the ninth to turn a close game into an 11–3 blowout at Petco Park. The 21-year-old Cuban Moncada, who earlier had singled, stolen a base and made a sharp defensive play, earned MVP honors in the Game, as the World team was able to end a six-game losing streak.
- July 12 – The American League defeated the National League, 4–2, in the 87th All-Star Game played at Petco Park in San Diego, California. In the second inning, Eric Hosmer hit a solo home run and Salvador Pérez belted a two-run homer against their former Kansas City Royals teammate Johnny Cueto. Hosmer added an RBI-single in the third to earn MVP honors.
- July 18 – The Minnesota Twins relieved Terry Ryan of his duties as the team's executive vice president and general manager, ending an association that lasted 44 years. The Twins entered the day with a 33–58 record, 21 games out of first place in the AL Central Division. Only the Atlanta Braves (32–60) has registered a worse record in the majors. Ryan, who joined the organization as a player in 1972, formed part of the Twins front office since 1986, serving as their general manager from 1994 through 2007, and again served in this capacity from 2011 until his dismissal. Assistant GM Rob Antony will replace Ryan on an interim basis.
- July 20 – Hanley Ramírez belted three two-run home runs, in the Boston Red Sox 11–7 interleague play victory against the San Francisco Giants at Fenway Park. Ramirez hit his first two shots in the second and third innings as the Red Sox built an 8–0 lead. The Giants answered with seven straight runs in the next two innings, and cut Boston's lead to 8–7. After that, Ramírez made a crucial defensive play starting a double play in the sixth inning, when, with the bases loaded and nobody out, he fielded a grounder and got the out at first base, then threw home to force out the potential tying run. He later responded in the bottom of the sixth with his third blast as the Sox held on for the win, which completed a two-game sweep of the NL West leaders and pushed the Sox into first place in the AL East by a half-game over the Baltimore Orioles. The three homers and six RBI were career-game highs for Ramírez.
- July 22 – Miguel Cabrera went 4-for-4, including a go-ahead two-RBI single in the seventh inning, as the Detroit Tigers beat the Chicago White Sox, 7–5, at U.S. Cellular Field. With his decisive hit, Cabrera put himself into the annals of Major League history, making him the eight player to reach both the 400 home run and 1,500 RBI milestone in the first 14 seasons of his playing career. The others are Alex Rodríguez, Manny Ramírez, Albert Pujols, Lou Gehrig, Jimmie Foxx, Jeff Bagwell and Hank Aaron, according to ESPN Stats & Information.
- July 23 – Nelson Cruz hit his ninth career grand slam and had a three-run home run, and the Seattle Mariners matched a season high with 19 hits, in an easy 14–5 victory over the Toronto Blue Jays at Rogers Centre. Cruz blasted his slam off R. A. Dickey in the third inning, and hit his three-run drive against Drew Storen in the eighth for his 20th career multi-homer game. This is the second time in Cruz's career that he has had at least two homers and seven RBI, the other coming on September 7, 2014, while playing with the Baltimore Orioles, as he has also collected two eight-RBI games.
- July 29 – The Washington Nationals pulled off a historic triple play en route to a 4–1 victory against the San Francisco Giants at AT&T Park. It was the first-ever 3–5 triple play in Major League Baseball history as well as the first in franchise history, according to the SABR Database. The feat started in the bottom in the eighth inning, with the bases loaded, nobody out, and Brandon Crawford hit a line drive off pitcher Sammy Solis. The ball was caught by first baseman Ryan Zimmerman, who stepped on the base for the second out and then threw to Anthony Rendon at third base, in time to force Denard Span for the third out.

=== August ===
- August 3 – Albert Pujols hit his 12th career walk-off home run, breaking a 6–6 tie and giving the Los Angeles Angels an 8–6 victory over the Oakland Athletics. His two-run homer also was his 20th career walk-off hit, which tied him with David Ortiz for the most of any hitter since the 2000 season and the third most since 1969 in Major League Baseball. Besides, Pujols tied with Babe Ruth, Jimmie Foxx, Mickey Mantle, Stan Musial, and Frank Robinson in second place for the most career walk-off home runs. The all-time, walk-off home run hitter is Jim Thome, who hit 13 in his Major League career.
- August 5 – Cleveland Indians catching prospect Francisco Mejía hit a double in the first inning in a Class-A game against the Salem Red Sox, to extend his historic hitting streak to 47 consecutive games, the longest in Minor League Baseball in 62 years. Mejía gave the Lynchburg Hillcats a quick 3–0 lead, but Salem used a big surge to claim a 13–6 victory at Lewis-Gale Field. The streak is also the seventh longest in Minor League Baseball history and the longest in the modern era, which began in 1963. The MiLB hit streak record is 69, set by Joe Wilhoit in 1919, while Joe DiMaggio, whose Major League record hit streak of 56 games is being celebrated for its 75th anniversary this season, had a 61-game Minor League hit streak in 1933, the second-longest of all time.
- August 7 – At Coors Field, Ichiro Suzuki becomes the 30th member of the 3,000 hit club. He collects the milestone hit, a triple off Chris Rusin, in the eighth inning of the Miami Marlins' 10–7 victory over the Colorado Rockies. Suzuki, who collected 1,278 hits while in Nippon Professional Baseball, becomes the second player to triple for his 3,000th Major League hit, Paul Molitor having done so in 1996.
- August 12 :
  - Alex Rodriguez plays the final game of his 22-year major league career as the New York Yankees beat the Tampa Bay Rays, 6–3. Rodriguez's final MLB hit was an RBI double in the first inning that tied the game at 1 while Starlin Castro delivered a game-winning 2-run home run in the 6th inning to power the Yankees to victory.
  - Hanley Ramírez hit a pair of three-run home runs and David Ortiz went 3-for-4 with one double and a solo homer, as the Boston Red Sox beat the Arizona Diamondbacks, 9–4, in interleague play at Fenway Park. For his part, Ramírez recorded his 20th career multi-homer game and matched his career high with six runs batted in, while Ortiz, with his home run, reached 1,000 extra-base hits and became the third player – along with Carl Yastrzemski (1,157) and Ted Williams (1,117) – to record 1,000 extra base hits in a Red Sox uniform.
- August 13 – New York Yankees prospects Tyler Austin and Aaron Judge hit back-to-back home runs in their first career at bat, as the Yankees defeated the Tampa Bay Rays, 8–4, at Yankee Stadium. Austin and Judge belted their homers against pitcher Matt Andriese in the second inning. It is the first time in Major League Baseball history that a pair of teammates hit consecutive home runs in their first career plate appearances. The feat was accomplished once before by opponents, when Heinie Mueller of the Philadelphia Phillies and Ernie Koy of the Brooklyn Dodgers each hit a home run in their first major league at-bats on April 19, 1938.
- August 14 :
  - The New York Yankees honored Mariano Rivera before their series finale against the Tampa Bay Rays at Yankee Stadium, officially dedicating a Monument Park plaque to the all-time saves leader and future Hall of Fame closer in a pregame ceremony. Rivera accepted his plaque and spoke at the Stadium, giving credit to the fans and everyone who helped during his 19-year career. Rivera was also joined on the field by his family, former teammates David Cone, Derek Jeter, Tino Martinez, Paul O'Neill, Andy Pettitte, Jorge Posada and John Wetteland, as well as his former managers Joe Torre and Joe Girardi, his former pitching coach, Mel Stottlemyre, and the Yankees former trainer, Gene Monahan.
  - Mookie Betts hit three home runs over the Green Monster and posted a career-high eight RBI, as the Boston Red Sox crushed the Arizona Diamondbacks, 16–3, to sweep the three-game interleague series. Dustin Pedroia, meanwhile, recorded his franchise-record fifth five-hit game and Rick Porcello converted into the first Red Sox pitcher in 70 years to open a season 12–0 at Fenway Park, since Dave Ferriss won his first 12 decisions at Fenway in 1946. Additionally, Betts became the 21st player in Major League Baseball history to hit three home runs in a single game twice in the same season. He also joined Ted Williams as the only Red Sox hitters ever to accomplish the feat. Williams did it in 1957, while Betts blasted three homers against the Baltimore Orioles at Camden Yards on May 31.
  - High Class-A Lynchburg Hillcats catcher Francisco Mejía halted his hitting streak at 50 games. A day after a controversial scoring change enabled Mejía to tie for the fourth-longest run in Minor League history, the Cleveland Indians No. 3 prospect went 0-for-3 with a walk and an RBI in a 6–0 shutout over the Winston-Salem Dash (CWS) at Calvin Falwell Field. It is the longest hitting streak since the Minor Leagues reclassified in 1963, and it's the longest by any player at any level since Román Mejías hit safely in 55 straight games for the Class-B Waco Pirates in 1954. Joe Wilhoit holds the record with 69 games (1919) and Joe DiMaggio is second with 61 games (1933).
- August 15 – Mookie Betts belted two home runs, a three-run homer in the fifth inning to put the Boston Red Sox ahead, 3–0, and a two-shot in the eighth, accounting for all five Red Sox runs in a 5–3 win over the Baltimore Orioles at Camden Yards. Sox starter Eduardo Rodríguez departed with no outs in the fifth-inning of a no-hitter due to a tight left hamstring and, while Matt Barnes carried the no-hitter into the seventh, a combination of three relievers allowed three runs in the inning to tie the game.
- August 19 – The Houston Astros defeated the Baltimore Orioles, 15–8, in a slugfest at Camden Yards. At the end, both teams combined for nine home runs. George Springer got things started, leading off the game with a home run off pitcher Wade Miley. But the Orioles set a modern Major League record by hitting four home runs before making an out in their first turn at-bat. Facing Collin McHugh, Adam Jones hit a home run on the first pitch he saw and Hyun Soo Kim delivered a single. Then Manny Machado, Chris Davis and Mark Trumbo all homered in succession, for a quick 5–1 lead. Nevertheless, the Astros scored five runs in the second inning, when Jose Altuve roped a two-out, two-run double, and kept going from there to win the game. After the teams traded five-run innings, Baltimore went up 7–6 in the third and Houston pulled even in the fourth and took a 9–7 lead in the fifth. Pedro Álvarez hit a solo shot in the bottom half before Houston pulled away with three runs in the sixth, thanks to a two-run homer by Altuve and a solo shot by Evan Gattis. Houston added three more runs the rest of the way, highlighted by a homer from Teoscar Hernández in the ninth. According to STATS LLC, the Orioles became the first team in the modern era (since 1900) to open a game with four home runs before making an out.
- August 22 – Baltimore Orioles closer Zach Britton ended his remarkable streak of 43 consecutive games without allowing an earned run, but was able to hold off a late ninth-inning rally by the Washington Nationals to help Baltimore edge the host Nationals 10–8. Britton gave up a single to Bryce Harper and an RBI double to Anthony Rendon, but got Ryan Zimmerman to ground into a game-ending double play as the Orioles won its third game in a row against Washington. It was the first earned run Britton allowed since April 30. His string of 43 pitching appearances without allowing one is the longest since the earned run statistic became official, dating back more than 100 years.
- August 24 – Boston Red Sox designated hitter David Ortiz reached a new milestone in his career, while hitting a two-run, home run against Tampa Bay Rays starter Matt Andriese in the first inning of a 4–3, 11-inning loss to the Rays at Tropicana Field. With the two-run blast, Ortiz recorded his 100th run batted in of the season and became the oldest player in Major League Baseball history to hit 30 homers in a single season, having managed the feat at 40 years and 280 days old. The two RBI also allowed Ortiz to join Hank Aaron, Barry Bonds, Jimmie Foxx, Lou Gehrig, Rafael Palmeiro, Albert Pujols, Manny Ramírez, Alex Rodríguez and Babe Ruth, as the only players with 10 or more MLB seasons with at least 30 homers and 100 RBI, which is also the most in Red Sox history. As far as the aforementioned players are concerned, Ortiz joined Aaron, Gehrig, Pujols and Ruth as the only ones to do it with the same team. Ortiz, who will retire at the end of the season, is additionally the first player to achieve the 30-HR, 100-RBI feat in his last MLB season.
- August 25 – At Dodger Stadium, Matt Moore of the San Francisco Giants has a no-hitter broken up with two out in the ninth in a 4–0 victory over the Los Angeles Dodgers. A single by the Dodgers' Corey Seager breaks up the bid, after which Moore, who records his first victory as a Giant after being traded from the Tampa Bay Rays at the trading deadline, is relieved by Santiago Casilla, who needs only one pitch to record the final out. The no-hitter would have given the Giants at least one in a record five consecutive seasons. Matt Cain had pitched a perfect game in 2012, followed by Tim Lincecum's two no-hitters in the 2013 and 2014 seasons, and Chris Heston's in 2015. They had entered the season tied with the 1962–1965 Los Angeles Dodgers with no-hitters pitched in four consecutive seasons; Sandy Koufax had pitched all four, the last of which was his perfect game in 1965. The Moore no-hitter also would have been the first by a Giants pitcher against the Dodgers since Rube Marquard, of the then New York Giants, no-hit the Brooklyn Dodgers in 1915.

=== September ===
- September 3 – Mike Trout, Albert Pujols and Kole Calhoun combined for five home runs to lead the Angels to a 10–3 victory over the host Seattle Mariners, with the trio hitting consecutive shots against Taijuan Walker in the first inning, and Calhoun and Pujols belting two homers apiece. For Pujols, it was his 587th career home run, which moved him past Frank Robinson into ninth place on the MLB's most home runs list. He later blasted his No. 588, completing the 55 multi-homer game of his career. Next up on the career home run list for Pujols is Sammy Sosa, who ranks eighth with 609 homers.
- September 6 – The St. Louis Cardinals hit five home runs, three of them in the ninth inning, to defeat the Pittsburgh Pirates at PNC Park. Matt Carpenter connected a pinch-hit, solo home run to tie the game 6–6, while Randal Grichuk and Jhonny Peralta homered later in the inning, as the Cardinals went on to win 9–7. Carpenter's pinch-hit shot gave the Cardinals a Major League record 15 pinch-hit homers in a season. The previous record of 14 pinch-hit home runs was held jointly by the San Francisco Giants and the Arizona Diamondbacks in the 2001 season. Yadier Molina and Matt Adams homered early in the game, to give the Cardinals a National league lead with 201 homers in the season, a second-best behind the American League leaders Baltimore Orioles (218). Additionally, the Cardinals tied the National League record for most consecutive games with at least one home run at 25. The Major League record is held by the Texas Rangers, who homered in 27 straight games in 2002.
- September 7 – The New York Mets sign former Heisman Trophy winner and NFL quarterback Tim Tebow to a minor league contract. At age 29, Tebow is slated to begin his professional baseball career in the fall Florida Instructional League on September 19.
- September 8 – Tyler Austin led off the bottom of the ninth inning with a walk-off home run off Erasmo Ramírez, to give the New York Yankees its season-high fifth consecutive victory, 5–4, over the visiting Tampa Bay Rays. It was the third home run for Austin in his 17th career game. Austin, who hit a home run in his first at-bat on August 13, belted his second career homer on his 25th birthday, two days before, and gave the Yankees the lead in a win against the Toronto Blue Jays. According to the Elias Sports Bureau, Austin is the first player in the modern era to hit a home run in his first at-bat, hit a home run on his birthday, and hit a walk-off home run within the first three home runs of his Major League career.
- September 10 – Los Angeles Dodgers pitcher Rich Hill hurled seven perfect innings against the host Miami Marlins, but was pulled by Dodgers manager Dave Roberts because of concern over a previous blister problem that caused Hill to miss significant time during the season. Hill had thrown 89 pitches and struck out nine before being replaced by Joe Blanton in the eight. But after two outs, Blanton allowed a single to Jeff Francoeur. Then, in the ninth, Dee Gordon added another single with two outs, as the Dodgers finally prevailed, 5–0. In the seventh, left fielder Yasiel Puig made an outstanding diving catch for the third out, depriving Martín Prado of a likely extra-base hit while preserving the perfect game for Hill. It is the second time Roberts removes a pitcher with a no-hitter bid going late in a game, having done the same to rookie Ross Stripling back on April 8. By then, Stripling had thrown 100 pitches and 7 1/3 innings in his Major League debut, a game the Dodgers finally lost to the San Francisco Giants at AT&T Park, 3–2, in 10 innings.
- September 11 – David Ortiz blasted a three-run home run against Joaquin Benoit in the sixth inning, as the Boston Red Sox went on to win the Toronto Blue Jays at Rogers Centre, 11–8, that restored their two-game lead in the American League East. The Red Sox had already blown two early leads and were now facing an 8–7 deficit. For Ortiz, it was his career 535 home run, moving him ahead of Jimmie Foxx into sole possession of 18th place on the MLB all-time home run list, and is now one homer behind Mickey Mantle for 17th in the list. It also brought back memories from the past, when Ortiz slugged a grand slam off Benoit, then with the Detroit Tigers, during the eighth inning of Game 2 of the 2013 ALCS with Boston in a 5–1 hole. The Red Sox won the game, 6–5, tied the series, and ended winning the AL championship in six games, en route to the 2013 World Series title. Heading into his 123rd and final regular season game ever at Rogers Centre, Ortiz already extended his own records for most career homers (41), runs batted in (108) and extra-base hits (76) for a visiting player. Ortiz also increased his RBI total to 110 in the season, the most by a player aged 40 or above since Dave Winfield had 108 for Toronto in 1992.
- September 12 :
  - Chicago Cubs pitcher Kyle Hendricks took a no-hitter bid into the ninth inning in a start against the St. Louis Cardinals at Busch Stadium, but Jeremy Hazelbaker led off the frame with a home run to break it up. Still, Hendricks earned his 15th victory of the season, 4–1, and lowered his ERA to 2.03, the best in Major League Baseball.
  - David Ortiz hit his 536th career home run at Fenway Park to tie Mickey Mantle for 17th place on the MLB all-time home run list, as the Boston Red Sox crushed the Baltimore Orioles, 12–2, to maintain a two-game lead over the Toronto Blue Jays in the AL East Division. David Price improved his season record to 16–8, allowing two runs on two hits without walks, while striking out nine in eight innings for his seventh victory in as many starts to set the longest winning streak of his career.
- September 14 – The Toronto Blue Jays announced the hiring of former Boston Red Sox general manager Ben Cherington as their new vice president of baseball operations. Cherington, who guided the Red Sox to the 2013 World Series title, left the organization after Dave Dombrowski was hired as president of baseball operations in August 2015. Since then, Dombrowski credited Cherington for helping to develop a talented group of young players for the Sox, including Mookie Betts, Xander Bogaerts, Jackie Bradley Jr. and Andrew Benintendi, among others. Cherington started his career as an advance scout for the Cleveland Indians in 1998, when Mark Shapiro worked as assistant general manager of the Indians. Shapiro joined the Blue Jays as their new president and chief executive officer (CEO) at the end of the 2015 season.
- September 15 :
  - The Chicago Cubs wasted its first chance to clinch the NL Central Division title after Scooter Gennett hit a two-run double in the seventh inning that lifted the Milwaukee Brewers to a 5–4 win at Wrigley Field. Nevertheless, the Cubs became the Major League first team to clinch their division, when the St. Louis Cardinals lost to the San Francisco Giants, 6–2, late at night. It was the first NLCD title for the Cubs since 2008, as well as its fourth overall.
  - Hanley Ramírez hit a two-out, three-run walk-off home run off Dellin Betances in the bottom of the ninth inning, to finish off a five-run rally that gave the Boston Red Sox a 7–5 victory over the New York Yankees at Fenway Park. Boston was down, 5–1, before David Ortiz ripped a solo home run in the eighth for his career homer No. 537, which put him ahead of Mickey Mantle for 17th place on MLB all-time home run list. Both homers were mammoth shots to center field. Ramirez's homer was projected at 441 feet while Ortiz's shot had a projected distance of 442 feet, according to STATS LLC.
  - Major League Baseball announced that San Diego Padres general manager A. J. Preller was suspended for 30 days without pay for submitting false medical records in the trade that sent Drew Pomeranz to the Boston Red Sox in exchange for top prospect Anderson Espinoza earlier this season. This is not the first time that Preller has been reprimanded by MLB. In 2010, Preller was suspended while serving as an assistant general manager for the Texas Rangers. That case involved the international signing rules, for negotiating and presenting a false age for Rafael De Paula, an amateur pitcher from the Dominican Republic. De Paula was also suspended and the Rangers fined.
- September 17 – Colorado Rockies pitcher Jon Gray set a team record by striking out 16 batters in a four-hit, complete game shutout over the San Diego Padres at Coors Field. Gray etched his name into the Rockies' book in surpassing the previous 14-strikeout performance of Darryl Kile, set on August 28, 1998. Gray also became the second Rockies pitcher to strike four batters in an inning, doing so in the second frame on a passed ball, and posted another team mark with six consecutive strikeouts.
- September 18 :
  - The Detroit Tigers defeated the Cleveland Indians, 9–5, while Miguel Cabrera collected his 2,500th career hit. Cabrera, a two-time American League MVP and triple crown winner, became the 100th player in Major League history to reach the milestone with his single off Indians starter Trevor Bauer in the third inning. Besides, the Venezuelan slugger also became the eighth player to do so by his age-33 season. The others on that short list include Hank Aaron, Ty Cobb, Jimmie Foxx, Rogers Hornsby, Mel Ott, Alex Rodriguez and Robin Yount. According to the Elias Sports Bureau, Cabrera is the youngest to reach the 2,500 hits mark since Aaron did it in 1967.
  - Hanley Ramírez hit two home runs and drove in four runs, to give the Boston Red Sox a 5–4 victory over the New York Yankees, while completing a four-game sweep at Fenway Park. The Yankees took a 4–0 lead in the fifth inning, but for the third time in four days, they were unable to lock it down. In the bottom of the frame, Ramírez belted a two-out, three-run homer off CC Sabathia and Jackie Bradley Jr. tied the score with an RBI single in the sixth on what wound up being the 112th and final pitch of the game for Sabathia. Then in the seventh, Ramírez hit his second homer of the game and fourth of the series against reliever Tyler Clippard that snapped the 4–4 tie, as the Red Sox swept a four-game series from the Yankees for the first time since June 4–7, 1990.
- September 20- Marlins pitcher Jose Fernandez strikes out 12 batters, allowing 3 hits and no walks in a 1–0 victory over the division-leading Washington Nationals. This was the final game of Fernandez's career as he is killed in a boating accident 5 days later.
- September 22 - Brian Dozier made history in the Minnesota Twins 9–2 loss to the Detroit Tigers at Target Field, as he blasted his 42nd home run of the season and his 40th while playing second base, which set a new American League single-season record for homers hit by a second baseman. Alfonso Soriano held the previously AL record for a second baseman with 39 homers while playing for the New York Yankees in the 2002 season. The Major League Baseball season record for a second baseman is shared by Rogers Hornsby, who connected 42 homers for the St. Louis Cardinals in 1922, and Davey Johnson, who slugged 42 homers for the 1973 Atlanta Braves.
- September 23 :
  - The Texas Rangers secured their second consecutive American League West Division title, becoming the first AL team to reach the playoffs with a 3–0 win against the host Oakland Athletics. This is the seventh ALWD title for the Rangers, and fourth since the 2010 season.
  - David Ortiz hit a 411-foot home run to right field in the first inning that supplied the necessary runs in the Boston Red Sox' 2–1 victory over the Tampa Bay Rays at Tropicana Field. Ortiz, who will retire at the end of the season, delivered his shot against starter Chris Archer and raised his runs batted in total to 124, one more than Shoeless Joe Jackson collected in his final season of 1920, when the RBI became an official statistic. It was the 37th home run for Ortiz in his farewell season. Three days previously, he had passed Dave Kingman for the most homers ever by a major league player in his final season. In 1986, Kingman hit 35 homers for the Oakland Athletics. This homer also tied Ortiz with Hall of Famer Lou Gehrig for the 10th most career extra-base hits (1,190). In addition, Ortiz hit a single in the seventh inning for his 2,465 career hit, putting him one hit shy of tying another Hall of Famer, Harry Hooper, for the 109th place on the all-time list.
- September 24 – The Washington Nationals defeated the visiting Pittsburgh Pirates, 6–1. Their victory ensured them a playoff berth, and then clinched the National League East Division title a few minutes later, when the second-place New York Mets lost to the Philadelphia Phillies, 10–8. For the Nationals, it was their third National League East title in five years.
- September 25 :
  - The Miami Marlins cancel their game against the Atlanta Braves at Marlins Park due to the tragic death of Marlins star pitcher José Fernández in a boating accident in Miami Beach earlier that morning.
  - The Los Angeles Dodgers defeated the visiting Colorado Rockies, 4–3, in the bottom of the 10th inning, and became the first National League West Division team to win the title for the fourth straight year. In addition, the Dodgers is the first National League team to clinch four division titles in a row since the Philadelphia Phillies won the NL East Division from 2007 through 2011.
  - The Boston Red Sox beat the Tampa Bay Rays, 3–2, in 10 innings at Tropicana Field, to complete their third sweep in a row. It was the 11th consecutive victory for the Red Sox, who set a Major League Baseball record by striking out 11 straight batters at one point in the game. Previously, the Sox swept the New York Yankees and Baltimore Orioles in their respective ballparks. Boston made history when their pitchers set a team record with 23 strikeouts, including a major league record of 11 in a row. The 23 strikeouts overall were the most in a 10-inning game since at least 1913 and the most in a game of any length since 2004. Starter Eduardo Rodríguez had a career-high 13 strikeouts through 5 1/3 innings, including the final six batters he faced. Rodríguez was relieved by Heath Hembree, who struck out all five Rays he saw in 1 2/3 innings. The New York Mets held the previous mark when Tom Seaver struck out 10 in a row against the San Diego Padres on April 22, 1970. Matt Barnes did strike out one and Joe Kelly fanned four to complete the feat. Dustin Pedroia, who sealed the previous game with a grand slam, hit a solo home run in the third inning and aggressively scored the winning run with an RBI-double by David Ortiz in the tenth. The relay throw from outfield beat Pedroia to the home plate, but he avoided catcher Luke Maile's first tag and past the plate. Then Pedroia went back to touch it and Maile was charged with an error when the ball dropped out of his glove on another tag attempt. Meanwhile, Mookie Betts extended his hitting streak to 11 games with an RBI single in the first. The Red Sox' one-run lead disappeared in the eighth inning when Fernando Abad allowed an RBI single to Brad Miller, but Kelly was able to come on and induced a 4–6–3 double play to end the eighth. He was credited with the win, pitching the last 2 2/3 innings.
- September 26 :
  - The Cleveland Indians earned a berth in the postseason with a 7–4 victory over the Detroit Tigers at Comerica Park. It was the first American League Central Division title for Cleveland in the last nine years and the eight overall. The Indians last won the American League Central division championship in 2007 and advanced to the AL Championship Series. They achieved a 3–1 advantage in the ALCS, only to lose to the eventual World Series Champion Boston Red Sox in seven games.
  - The Miami Marlins defeat the New York Mets 7–3 in the team's first game since the tragic death of pitcher José Fernández the previous day. In the first inning, Marlins second baseman Dee Gordon took the first pitch from Mets pitcher Bartolo Colón batting right-handed and imitating Fernández's batting stance. Gordon then switched around to bat left-handed and then two pitches later hit his first home run of the season.
- September 28 :
  - The Boston Red Sox won its third American League East Division title in the last ten seasons, despite squandering a three-run lead in the ninth inning of a 5–3 loss to the host New York Yankees. The Red Sox assured their division title nearly 30 minutes before, when the Baltimore Orioles rallied for a 3–2 victory over the second place Toronto Blue Jays at Rogers Centre. With their win, the Orioles moved within one game of the AL wild card leading Blue Jays. New York is four games back of the second AL wild card spot and is either an Orioles' win or Yankees loss from being officially eliminated from the playoffs.
  - John Jaso hit for the cycle and drove in five runs, leading the Pittsburgh Pirates to an 8–4 victory over the Chicago Cubs at PNC Park. As a result, Jaso completed the first cycle in the history of Pittsburgh's ballpark since it was inaugurated in 2001. Furthermore, Jaso became just the second catcher in Major League Baseball history to hit a cycle and catch a perfect game, joining Hall of Famer Ray Schalk, who caught the Charlie Robertson's perfecto in 1922 while playing for the Chicago White Sox. Jaso did so for the Seattle Mariners, along with Félix Hernández in 2012.
- September 29 :
  - The Chicago Cubs announced that president of baseball operations Theo Epstein was signed a five-year contract extension that will run from 2017 through 2021. The Cubs also gave extensions to general manager Jed Hoyer and vice president of amateur scouting and player development Jason McLeod. Epstein, 42, resigned as general manager of the Boston Red Sox to join the Cubs in October 2011. While the early stages of his tenure were mired with losing clubs, the Cubs were transformed from a mediocre cellar dweller team to a powerhouse that has posted the best record in Major League Baseball this season after finishing with 97 wins a year ago.
  - For the first time since the 2005 season, a Major League Baseball game ends in a tie as rain stops the final scheduled contest of the year between the Chicago Cubs and the Pittsburgh Pirates in the sixth inning with the score tied at 1–1. The game will not be resumed as its result has no bearing on the postseason results. Instead of becoming a suspended game, the statistics count and it was declared a tie, the first since the Houston Astros and Cincinnati Reds went seven innings on June 30, 2005, before rain halted them.
- September 30 – The Cincinnati Reds announced that Bryan Price will return as the team's manager for the 2017 season. His new deal includes a club option for 2018. The entire coaching staff also has been offered one-year contracts as well. Price joined the Reds as their pitching coach in 2010, and was promoted to manager after the 2013 season when Dusty Baker was dismissed.

=== October ===
- October 1 – The New York Mets beat the Philadelphia Phillies, 5–3, and secured a berth in the postseason, qualifying for the playoffs in consecutive seasons for just the second time in franchise history. As the No. 1 seed in the National League wild card game, they will host the No. 2 seed on October 5 at Citi Field. The Mets last reached consecutive postseasons in 1999 and 2000, both times as the wild-card entry.
- October 2 – The Baltimore Orioles beat the New York Yankees, 5–2, to clinch an American League Wild Card spot, while the Toronto Blue Jays assured a berth in the postseason when the Detroit Tigers lost to the Atlanta Braves 1–0. Later, Toronto defeated the Boston Red Sox, 2–1, to earn the No. 1 wild-card spot and will host the Orioles on October 4. The winner move on to face the Texas Rangers in the AL Division Series. Furthermore, the San Francisco Giants were the last National League team to reach the playoffs, securing the second NL wild card with a 7–1 win over the Los Angeles Dodgers, during what turned out to be the last game behind the mike for legendary Hall of Fame broadcaster Vin Scully. San Francisco, which won World Series titles between 2010 and 2014, plays at the defending NL champion New York Mets on October 4 in the NL wild-card game, with the winner advancing to the NL Division Series against the Chicago Cubs.
- October 3 :
  - The Chicago White Sox named Rick Renteria as the 40th field manager in club history, replacing Robin Ventura, who managed the Sox during the last five seasons. Renteria served as bench coach under Ventura this past season and previously managed the Cubs in 2014, joining Johnny Evers as the only people in the history of the Chicago franchises to manage both. Besides, Renteria spent six seasons on the San Diego Padres' coaching staff, including 2011–2013 as their bench coach and 2008–2010 coaching at first base. In between, he managed the Mexico Team in the 2013 World Baseball Classic.
  - Walt Weiss resigned as Colorado Rockies manager after four seasons at the helm, even though his departure was not entirely unexpected, as he was in the last year of a three-year contract and there were no negotiations to extend that during the season. Weiss posted a 283–365 record in his four-year managing tenure and never had a winning season. An All-Star shortstop and Rookie of Year Award winner, he played for four teams in 14 seasons spanning 1987–2000, four of them with the Rockies in the mid-1990s, including their wild card-winning season of 1995. Weiss later served in the organization as a special assistant to the general manager for seven years from 2002 to 2008.
  - Coming off another disappointing season, the Arizona Diamondbacks announced that general manager Dave Stewart and field manager Chip Hale will not be back in 2017, as Stewart was told his contract would not be renewed and Hale was dismissed. The role of chief baseball officer Tony La Russa had not been resolved. Arizona finished with a 69–93 record in 2016, 22 games out of first place, and missed the playoffs again. La Russa was hired in May 2014 to oversee the baseball operations department and he spent the rest of that season evaluating the organization. As a result, La Russa dismissed GM Kevin Towers and manager Kirk Gibson in September that year and then hired Stewart and Hale to replace them. The Diamondbacks clinched the 2001 World Series and won three National League west division titles between 2002 and 2011, but the team has been in a steady decline since then, posting five consecutive non-winning seasons.
- October 4 – Edwin Encarnación hit a three-run home run in the bottom of the 11th inning at Rogers Centre, to send the Toronto Blue Jays to a 5–2 victory over the Baltimore Orioles in the American League Wild Card Game. Toronto now advances to the AL Division Series for a best-of-five rematch against the Texas Rangers at Globe Life Park in Arlington. It also was the first postseason walk-off home run for the Blue Jays since Joe Carter hit one to win the 1993 World Series.
- October 5 – The San Francisco Giants defeated the New York Mets, 3–0, behind the pitching of Madison Bumgarner and a three-run home run from Conor Gillaspie off reliever Jeurys Familia in the ninth inning, to win the National League Wild Card Game at Citi Field. With their victory, the Giants advanced to face the heavily favored host Chicago Cubs in the best-of-five NL Division Series beginning on October 7. Bumgarner, who allowed four hits with two walks and struck out six in his third career postseason shutout, completed 23 consecutive innings pitched in the postseason without giving up a run, setting a new MLB record. In a losing effort, Mets starter Noah Syndergaard carried a no-hitter with two outs into the sixth inning before taking a no-decision after seven shutout frames and 10 strikeouts.
- October 6 :
  - Troy Tulowitzki hit a bases-loaded triple that capped a five-run third inning and Marco Estrada pitched a gem as the Toronto Blue Jays crushed the host Texas Rangers, 10–1, in Game 1 of the American League Division Series. José Bautista added a three-run homer in the ninth inning and drove in four runs, while Josh Donaldson went 4-for-4 along with two RBI and two runs scored. For his part, Estrada hurled a shutout through 8 1/3 strong innings, allowing a run on four hits and striking out six batters without issuing a walk. Rangers starter Cole Hamels lasted just 3 1/3 innings, giving up seven runs (six earned) on six hits and three walks while striking out one.
  - The host Cleveland Indians tagged Rick Porcello for three solo home runs in the third inning en route to a 5–4 victory over the Boston Red Sox in Game 1 of the American League Division Series. Roberto Pérez, Jason Kipnis and Francisco Lindor homered in a four-batter, nine-pitch span, which marked the first time the Indians achieved the feat in a postseason game since Manny Ramírez, Jim Thome and Mark Whiten did it against Andy Pettitte in the 1998 American League Championship Series. Andrew Miller worked two shutout innings of relief for Cleveland starter Trevor Bauer and was credited with the win.
- October 7 :
  - The Toronto Blue Jays smashed four home runs to take a 5–3 victory over the Texas Rangers in Game 2 of the American League Division Series. All four homers came off Texas starter Yu Darvish, which provided the Blue Jays with a 2–0 lead in the best-of-five format and pushed the Rangers to the brink of elimination. For Troy Tulowitzki, who delivered the big hit for Toronto with a bases-loaded triple in Game 1, his two-run shot in the top of the second inning was his fourth career postseason home run. The Blue Jays then broke the game wide open in the fifth with three solo homers from Kevin Pillar, Edwin Encarnación and Ezequiel Carrera. Toronto starter J. A. Happ pitched five-plus innings and allowed just one run. He scattered nine hits and had five strikeouts with a walk, while closer Roberto Osuna came from the bullpen for a five-out save. Now the series moves to Toronto's Rogers Centre, where a win will propel Canada's team into a second consecutive AL Championship Series.
  - Cleveland Indians starter Corey Kluber pitched seventh scoreless innings to set up a 6–0 home win against the Boston Red Sox. Showing no signs of a late-season groin tightness, Kluber allowed only three singles along with seven strikeouts and three walks. After that, Dan Otero and Bryan Shaw combined for two perfect-innings of relief, which moved the Indians to within one win of a place in the American League Championship Series for the first time in nine years. For his part, Lonnie Chisenhall connected for a three-run home run in the second inning off Boston starter David Price, who fell to a 0–8 record with a 5.74 earned run average in nine career playoff starts. Price lasted just 3 1/3 innings, allowing five runs on six hits in only 65 pitches, as the Red Sox fell into a 2–0 deficit in the series and will face elimination in Game 3 at Fenway Park.
  - Los Angeles Dodgers pitching ace Clayton Kershaw was not at his best form but did enough to lead the Dodgers to a 4–3 win over the host Washington Nationals in Game 1 of the National League Division Series. Kershaw, who was backed by early home runs from Corey Seager and Justin Turner, gave up an uncharacteristic eight hits but did strike out seven and walked one in his five innings of work, throwing 101 pitches in the process. At the beginning, Kershaw had a 4–0 lead in the bottom of the third inning but gave up a two-run, RBI single to Anthony Rendon, followed by an RBI sacrifice fly from Trea Turner in the fourth to cut the Nationals' deficit to 4–3. Then four Dodgers relievers combined to pitch four scoreless innings and close out the game. Washington starter Max Scherzer allowed the four runs on five hits, striking out five without issuing a walk in six innings and was credited with the loss.
  - The Chicago Cubs–San Francisco Game 1 of the National League Division Series was a classic pitchers' duel between Cubs' Jon Lester and Giants' Johnny Cueto, with the game scoreless into the bottom of the eighth inning at Wrigley Field. Cubs second baseman Javier Báez supplied the only run of the game with a solo home run that just made it to the restricted basket above the left field wall. As a result, the run ended the Giants record of not giving up a run in 23 innings of postseason play, dating back to the 2014 World Series. Lester spaced six hits and strike out six batters without allowing a walk, guiding the Cubs to a 1–0 record in the best-of-five NL Division Series. In the ninth, Cubs closer Aroldis Chapman allowed a two-out double to Buster Posey in the ninth, before retiring Hunter Pence on a ground out to Báez for the final out of the game. Cueto was the hard luck loser as he went the distance for San Francisco, allowing only three hits and striking out ten while walking none.
- October 8 :
  - The Chicago Cubs beat the San Francisco Giants, 5–2, taking a 2–0 advantage in the best-of-five National League Division Series in front of a sellout crowd of 42,392 at Wrigley Field. Cubs starter Kyle Hendricks contributed with a two-run RBI single in the second inning that led to an early departure for Giants starter Jeff Samardzija, but was forced to leave the game after suffering a right forearm bruise in the fourth inning. Hendricks was replaced by Travis Wood, who retired the last out of the inning and then in the bottom half hit a home run off George Kontos to the left field bleachers. It was the first home run by a relief pitcher in the postseason since New York Giants' Rosy Ryan hit one in Game 3 of the 1924 World Series. Moreover, Wood joined Rick Sutcliffe (1984 NLCS) and Kerry Wood (2003 NLCS) as the only Cubs pitchers to hit a home run in the playoffs. Wood pitched 1 1/3 scoreless innings and earned the win, while three more relievers and closer Aroldis Chapman maintained the three-run lead. The Game 3 will be played on Monday 10 at San Francisco's AT&T Park.
  - MLB commissioner Rob Manfred announced that the National League Division Series Game 2 between the Washington Nationals and Los Angeles Dodgers had been postponed until Sunday due to a steady rain falling in Washington, D.C. area.
- October 9 :
  - José Lobatón hit a three-run home run that capped a third-inning rally and Daniel Murphy went 3-for-3 with two RBI as the Washington Nationals defeated the visiting Los Angeles Dodgers, 5–2, in Game 2 of the National League Division Series. Nationals starter Tanner Roark allowed two runs and seven hits in just 4 1/3 innings, but five relievers combined to shut out Los Angeles for the final 4 2/3 innings. The light-hitting and rarely used Lobatón, who is playing as a replacement for injured All-Star catcher Wilson Ramos, became an unlikely hero in the rain-postponed game when his shot served to erase an early deficit and evened the best-of-five series at one-all. Blake Treinen was credited with the win while Mark Melancon earned the save. Dodgers starter Rich Hill gave up four runs and six hits in 4 1/3 innings and was charged with the loss. The series will resume on Monday 10 at Dodger Stadium.
  - The Toronto Blue Jays beat the Texas Rangers at Rogers Centre, 7–6, to sweep their best-of-five American League Division Series and advance to the AL Championship Series for the second straight year. Texas led the league with 95 victories in the regular season, but lost three games in a row to Toronto for a second straight ALDS exit. Josh Donaldson scored the winning run in the 10th inning, after Texas second baseman Rougned Odor bounced a double play relay throw with two outs. Toronto starter Aaron Sanchez was removed with two outs in the sixth inning. He was charged with six runs (four earned) on three hits and four walks, including home runs by Odor and Elvis Andrus. Then four relievers combined to allow one hit in 4 1/3 scoreless innings, including a six-out win from closer Roberto Osuna. The Blue Jays offensive was led by Donaldson, who went 3-for-5 with two doubles, two runs and one RBI, while Edwin Encarnación hit a three-run homer with an RBI single, and Russell Martin added a solo shot. Texas starter Colby Lewis lasted only two innings, allowing five runs and five hits in just 42 pitches, being followed by six relievers. Matt Bush was the losing pitcher after 2 2/3 innings of work. The Blue Jays will face now the winner of the Boston Red Sox–Cleveland Indians series.
  - The Game 3 of the American League Division Series between the Boston Red Sox and Cleveland Indians at Fenway Park was officially postponed due to rain. It was rescheduled for Monday 10.
- October 10 :
  - Jayson Werth hit an RBI double and one home run, helping move the Washington Nationals within one victory of taking a postseason series as a team for the first time with an 8–3 win over the Los Angeles Dodgers. Corey Seager slashed a double in the bottom of the first inning to score Justin Turner and give the Dodgers an early 1–0 lead. But the Nationals responded with four runs in the third, which included a two run-homer by Anthony Rendon. After that, Carlos Ruiz smashed a two-run homer in the fifth that put the score at 4–3. Both teams then traded zeroes until the top of the ninth, when Wertz delivered his solo shot and Ryan Zimmerman added a two-run RBI double. Zimmerman then scored an insurance run on a sacrifice fly RBI from Chris Heisey. Nationals starter Gio González allowed all three runs by the Dodgers in 4 1/3 innings, but four relievers preserved the rest of the way, with Sammy Solis being credited with the win. The losing pitcher was Kenta Maeda, who lasted just three innings while allowing four runs on five hits and two walks alongside four strikeouts. The Game 4 of the National League Division Series will be played at Dodger Stadium, which left Los Angeles on the brink of elimination at home.
  - The Cleveland Indians completed a three-game sweep of the Boston Red Sox with a 4–3 win at Fenway Park in the American League Division Series. Tyler Naquin delivered a two-run single off losing pitcher Clay Buchholz in the fourth inning, and Coco Crisp added a two-run home run against Drew Pomeranz in the sixth to give the Indians a 4–1 lead. On the other hand, Josh Tomlin pitched five strong innings of four-hit ball and two runs for Cleveland. He then was backed by relievers Andrew Miller and Bryan Shaw, while closer Cody Allen got four outs as the Indians advanced the AL Championship Series for the first time since 2007. Red Sox designated hitter David Ortiz collected an RBI sacrifice fly in before walking on four pitches during his final career plate appearance in the eight inning. Through 14 seasons of top notch ranking, Ortiz guided the Red Sox to its first three World Series titles since their 1918 season. Ten minutes after the final out, when most of Cleveland's players had moved the field celebration into the visitors' clubhouse, the Boston faithful demanded to see Ortiz one more time. Chants of "We're not leaving!" and "Thank you, Papi!" finally drew Ortiz back onto the field, where he lumbered out to the pitching mound and tipped his cap in all directions. The Indians advanced to the AL Championship Series for the first time since 2007, when they beat the New York Yankees in the ALDS and then wasted a 3–1 lead over the Red Sox in the ALCS. As a home club, Cleveland will wait for the Toronto Blue Jays to open the best-of-seven championship series on October 14.
  - Joe Panik doubled Brandon Crawford with the winning run to snap a tie in the bottom of the 13th inning, sending the San Francisco Giants to a 6–5 victory over the Chicago Cubs in Game 3 of the National League Division Series at AT&T Park. Giants starter Madison Bumgarner pitched just five innings, allowing a three-run home run to the opposing pitcher, Jake Arrieta, to finish his MLB record of 24 consecutive innings of shutout ball during the postseason. Eleven relievers were used in the game, with Ty Blach earning the win and Mike Montgomery taking the loss, as San Francisco trimmed the Cubs' lead in the best-of-five series to 2–1.
- October 11 :
  - Chase Utley delivered a tie-breaking RBI single with two outs in the eighth inning to give the Los Angeles Dodgers a 6–5 victory over the Washington Nationals at Dodger Stadium. Utley singled off reliever and losing pitcher Blake Treinen, leveling the National League Division Series at 2–2 and allowing the Dodgers to force a decisive Game 5 at Washington on October 13. The Dodgers held a 4–2 lead after three innings and 5–2 after five, when the Nationals loaded the bases against Los Angeles starter Clayton Kershaw with two outs in the top of the seventh. Kershaw was removed after throwing 110 pitches, being replaced with Pedro Báez, who promptly hit Jayson Werth with his first pitch, before Daniel Murphy followed with a two-run single off Luis Avilán to tie the score at 5–5. Kershaw, who was pitching on three days' rest for the fourth consecutive postseason, struck out 11 but was charged with five runs on seven hits and two walks in 6 2/3 innings of work. Dodgers reliever Joe Blanton did strike out two in a scoreless 1 1/3 innings for the win and closer Kenley Jansen also struck out two in one inning for the save. Washington starter Joe Ross lasted only 2 2/3 innings, allowing four runs on four hits and two walks alongside three strikeouts. Besides, Adrián González hit a two-run home run for the Dodgers while Murphy went 2-for-3 with four RBI for the Nationals.
  - Javier Báez slashed an RBI single that capped a four-run rally in the top of the ninth inning to lead the Chicago Cubs to a 6–5 victory over the San Francisco Giants at AT&T Park and a 3–1 National League Division Series win. As a result, the Cubs uprising against five San Francisco relievers denied the Giants an 11th consecutive win in an elimination game, which would have extended their own MLB record. Giants starter Matt Moore limited the Cubs to two runs and two hits over eight innings and Conor Gillaspie went 4-for-4 in an 11-hit effort, as the Giants were three outs away from forcing a fifth and deciding game when they took a 5–2 lead into the ninth. But Ben Zobrist hit an RBI double and Willson Contreras contributed with a two-run, game-tying RBI single with none out, before Báez singled in the go-ahead run two batters later. Cubs starter John Lackey allowed four runs in four innings and Héctor Rondón, who worked a scoreless eighth inning, was credited with the win. Rondón was followed by closer Aroldis Chapman, who blew a save in the 13-inning loss the previous game, but now earned his third save of the series by striking out the side in the ninth, sending his team into the next round. Giants reliever Will Smith was charged with the loss, even though the run off him was unearned. Next up for the Cubs will be Game 1 of the National League Championship Series, set for Saturday 15 at Wrigley Field against either the Washington Nationals or Los Angeles Dodgers.
  - The Atlanta Braves hired interim manager Brian Snitker as their full-time skipper in 2017 with a club option for the 2018 season. Additionally, the Braves announced that Ron Washington has been signed as the team's new third base coach, as Bo Porter will become a special assistant to general manager John Coppolella. It will be the 41st year that Snitker has worked for the Atlanta organization. A former catcher, he has spent 20 of those seasons managing 2,571 games in the Minor Leagues at Triple-A, Double-A, Class-A Advanced, Class-A and Rookie ball levels, and also has coached in the Majors for more than 10 years. He was named interim manager earlier this season after the Braves dismissed Fredi González from the post that he had occupied since the 2011 campaign. The Braves finished last in the National League East Division but won 20 of their last 30 games with Snitker at the helm. Overall, the club posted a 37–35 record after the All-Star break.
- October 13 – The Los Angeles Dodgers beat the host Washington Nationals in Game 5 of the National League Division Series, 4–3, to advance to the National League Championship Series. Held scoreless through six innings by Washington starter Max Scherzer, the Dodgers broke out in the seventh inning against five relievers. Two days after starting Game 4 in Los Angeles, Clayton Kershaw made his first relief appearance since 2009 and sealed the victory for the Dodgers. Washington had taken an early 1–0 lead in the second inning, when Daniel Murphy scored on an RBI single by Danny Espinosa off Dodgers starter Rich Hill. Joc Pederson then led off the seventh with a solo home run to left off Scherzer, who allowed five hits along two walks and did strike out seven while throwing 98 pitches. After that, Carlos Ruiz hit a go-ahead single off reliever and losing pitcher Marc Rzepczynski, and Justin Turner added a two-run triple to give Los Angeles a 4–1 lead. But Washington came back in the bottom of the inning after a walk and a two-run homer by Chris Heisey off Grant Dayton, who then put another runner on base and was relieved by closer Kenley Jansen. Regardless allowing four walks and one hit, Jansen was still able to strike out four and get eight outs before being replaced by Kershaw to retire the final two batters. Julio Urías, who pitched two innings of relief, was credited with the win and Kershaw earned the save. The Dodgers now will face the Chicago Cubs in the best-of-seven National League Championship Series starting at Wrigley Field on Saturday 15.
- October 16 - The Arizona Diamondbacks hired Mike Hazen as their new general manager and executive vice president. Tony La Russa, formerly the team's chief baseball officer, will remain as a chief baseball analyst and adviser. Hazen spent 2016 as the Boston Red Sox general manager, serving as the point man under Boston president of baseball operations Dave Dombrowski. Hazen have joined the Red Sox in 2006, first as the team's director of player development and then as the assistant GM for Ben Cherington. Prior to that, Hazen worked for five seasons in the Cleveland Indians scouting and player development departments.
- October 19 - The Cleveland Indians won their first American League pennant since 1997 by defeating the Toronto Blue Jays, 3–0, in Game 5 of the AL Championship Series at Rogers Centre. Carlos Santana and Coco Crisp belted home runs that give them the runs they need. Besides, rookie Ryan Merritt pitched 4 1/3 shutout innings before turning the ball over to reliever Andrew Miller, who pitched another 2 2/3 scoreless innings. Miller was named the Series Most Valuable Player in recognition of his four dominating appearances, all during critical phases of victories by the Indians.
- October 22 - Kyle Hendricks outpitched Clayton Kershaw, while Anthony Rizzo and Willson Contreras homered early, as the Chicago Cubs took their first National League pennant since 1945, beating the Los Angeles Dodgers at Wrigley Field, 5–0, to clinch the NL Championship Series in six games. Second baseman Javier Báez and pitcher Jon Lester shared the Series Most Valuable Player honors.

=== November ===
- November 2 :
  - The Chicago Cubs won their first World Series title in 108 years by defeating the host Cleveland Indians in the 10th inning of Game 7, 8–7, making up a three games to one deficit in the process. Ben Zobrist, who went 10-for-28 (.357) in the series and delivered a go-ahead double in the top of the inning, earned Most Valuable Player honors. The Cleveland club now takes over as owner of the longest championship drought in the World Series, with their last title having come in 1948.
  - The Doosan Bears beat the NC Dinos, 8–1, to complete the four-game sweep of the 2016 Korean Series at Masan Baseball Stadium. The series MVP Yang Eui-ji blasted a solo home run as part of his three-hit night, while starter Yoo Hee-kwan pitched five shutout innings for the win, as the Bears captured its second straight Korean Series winners title.
- November 3 - The Minnesota Twins announced the hiring of Thad Levine as their new senior vice president and general manager. The team finished with a 59–103 mark in this season, the worse record than any other Twins team since the franchise moved to Minnesota in 1961. Levine had been with the Texas Rangers since the 2005 season, as his responsibilities in Texas included assisting GM Jon Daniels in multiple capacities. Levine, who will work under the Twins' new chief baseball officer Derek Falvey, previously worked for the Colorado Rockies and Los Angeles Dodgers.
- November 5 - The Arizona Diamondbacks announced that Torey Lovullo will be their new manager. Lovullo will receive a three-year deal, according to a source. Lovullo, who served as bench coach for the Boston Red Sox for the last four seasons, spent ten seasons as a Minor League skipper between the Cleveland Indians and Red Sox organizations and also acted as interim manager for Boston while incumbent John Farrell underwent treatment for lymphoma late in the 2015 season. Lovullo has a longstanding relationship with new Arizona general manager Mike Hazen, as they worked together with both the Red Sox and the Indians.
- November 7 - Bud Black was introduced as the new manager of the Colorado Rockies. Black, who replaces departed Walt Weiss, received a three-year deal with at least one option included. Black will now manage his second National League West team, having previously served as the San Diego Padres skipper from 2007 through 2015. The Padres went 649-713 under Black, who helped the club to an 89-win season in 2007 and a 90-victory campaign in 2010, earning NL Manager of the Year honors in the latter season. The Washington Nationals nearly hired Black after the 2015 season before contract talks broke down and the Nationals then hired Dusty Baker. After a major league pitching career that spanned 15 seasons, Black became a respected pitching coach for the Anaheim Angels from 2000 to 2006, helping the team win the 2002 World Series title.
- November 30 - Major League Baseball announced that has reached a tentative five-year labor agreement with the Major League Baseball Players Association through the 2021 season, hours before the old labor agreement was set to expire. The new CBA extends through the 2021 season and is subject to ratification by both parties, knowing there was far too much at stake for an impasse.

=== December ===
- December 14 - Major League Baseball and the MLB Player's Association officially ratified the new collective bargaining agreement, per announcements from both entities. The new agreement will run for five years. By the end of the new agreement, Baseball will have gone 26 years without a strike or a lockout since the 1994-95 players' strike that cancelled the 1994 World Series, continuing the sport's longest period of labor peace since the inception of the collective bargaining relationship, according to an MLB statement.

== Deaths ==
=== January ===
- January 5 – Jay Ritchie, 79, durable long reliever for the Boston Red Sox, Atlanta Braves and Cincinnati Reds in a span of five seasons from 1964 to 1968, who over a stretch of six appearances in May 1967 for the Reds, tossed 11 2/3 hitless innings, including retiring 28 consecutive batters.
- January 9 – Lance Rautzhan, 63, left-handed reliever for the Los Angeles Dodgers from 1977 to 1979, while facing the New York Yankees in the 1977 and 1978 World Series, who was the winning pitcher in Game 3 of the 1977 NLCS against the Philadelphia Phillies, when the Dodgers came back from a two-out, 5–3 deficit in the top of the 9th inning following key pinch hits by Vic Davalillo and Manny Mota.
- January 10 – Alton Brown, 90, pitcher for the 1951 Washington Senators, who never played organized baseball at any level until he was with an Army team during World War II.
- January 11 – Monte Irvin, 96, Hall of Fame left fielder who played a significant role in the integration of MLB while mentoring many of the African-American players who were breaking into the big leagues in the 1950s, whose playing career spanned almost 18 seasons, from his debut in the Negro leagues with the Newark Eagles in 1938 to seven seasons with the New York Giants from 1949 to 1955 and one with the Chicago Cubs in 1956, leading the Giants to the 1951 National League pennant, after hitting .312 with 24 home runs and a league-best 121 RBI, en route to a third-place finish in the MVP voting behind Roy Campanella and Stan Musial.
- January 13 – Luis 'Tite' Arroyo, 88, a two-time All-Star relief pitcher who was the first Puerto Rican-born player to appear for the New York Yankees, joining them in 1960 to become a key part of their American League pennant-winning staff that year, while posting a 15–5 record with a 2.19 ERA in 119 relief innings in 1961, en route to the World Series championship.
- January 19 – Rich Severson, 71, shortstop for the Kansas City Royals in parts of two seasons from 1970 to 1971.
- January 19 – Frank Sullivan, 85, two-time All-Star pitcher who played for the Boston Red Sox, Philadelphia Phillies and Minnesota Twins from 1953 to 1963, and also topped the American League with 18 wins and 260 innings in 1955.
- January 23 – Marie Mahoney, 91, outfielder who played from 1947 to 1948 in the All-American Girls Professional Baseball League, as well as the only Houston-born ballplayer to perform in the league during its twelve years of existence.
- January 23 – Walt 'No-Neck' Williams, 72, corner outfielder and solid hitter best known for his hustle during his six seasons with the Chicago White Sox from 1967 to 1972, while hitting .304 in 1969 for the sixth-best average in the American League.
- January 24 – Clyde Mashore, 70, outfielder who played from 1969 through 1973 for the Cincinnati Reds and Montreal Expos.
- January 25 – Ron Stillwell, 76, middle-infielder for the Washington Senators in the 1961 and 1962 seasons, who also coached at Thousand Oaks, Cal Lutheran and Moorpark College, and was co-captain of USC's national championship baseball team in 1961.
- January 27 – Barbara Berger, 85, All-American Girls Professional Baseball League catcher from 1949 to 1950.
- January 30 – Betty Francis, 84, All-American Girls Professional Baseball League slugging outfielder who played with four teams in a span of six seasons from 1949 to 1954.

=== February ===
- February 6 – James Moore, 99, Negro leagues first baseman and member of three All-Star teams.
- February 15 – Dave Adlesh, 72, backup catcher who played for the Houston Colt .45s/Astros from 1963 to 1968.
- February 15 – Virgil Jester, 88, pitcher who beat the Brooklyn Dodgers in the last game of the 1952 Boston Braves season and remained with the team after it moved to Milwaukee the next year.
- February 16 – Alcibíades Colón, 96, Dominican Republic right fielder and member of the 1950 national team, who in 1955 made history as the first player to connect a hit and score a run in the Estadio Quisqueya of Santo Domingo.
- February 17 – Brock Pemberton, 62, first baseman who played from 1974 to 1975 for the New York Mets.
- February 17 – Tony Phillips, 56, valuable utility man who spent 18 seasons in the majors from 1982 to 1999, mostly with the Oakland Athletics, playing also for the Detroit Tigers, Chicago White Sox, Anaheim Angels, New York Mets and Toronto Blue Jays, while winning a 1989 World Series ring with the Athletics.
- February 18 – Jim Davenport, 82, two-time All-Star infielder who played his entire career with the San Francisco Giants from 1958 through 1970, leading the National League third basemen in fielding percentage in 1960 and 1961, while winning a Gold Glove in 1962; managed 1985 Giants to a 56–88 record before his firing and replacement by Roger Craig on September 17.
- February 20 – Kevin Collins, 69, third baseman for the New York Mets, Montreal Expos, and Detroit Tigers in a span of six seasons from 1965 to 1971, and a member of the 1969 Miracle Mets.
- February 23 – Jacqueline Mattson, 87, catcher who played from 1950 to 1951 in the All-American Girls Professional Baseball League.
- February 24 – Eddie Einhorn, 80, baseball executive, vice chairman of the Chicago White Sox and minority owner from 1981 until his death.
- February 27 – Bob Spicer, 90, relief pitcher for the Kansas City Athletics in the 1955 and 1956 seasons.

=== March ===
- March 7 – Steve Kraly, 86, starting pitcher for the 1953 New York Yankees World Series champions, who later became a fixture in the press box as the official scorer for Binghamton Mets games, since the franchise's inaugural season in 1992 until 2015.
- March 12 – Annastasia Batikis, 88, center fielder who played for the Racine Belles of the All-American Girls Professional Baseball League during the 1945 season.
- March 12 – Bill Whitby, 72, pitcher for the 1964 Minnesota Twins.
- March 13 – Trent Baker, 25, Australian pitcher for the Brisbane Bandits, who also spent time in the Cleveland Indians and Atlanta Braves Minor League systems.
- March 14 – June Peppas, 86, All-American Girls Professional Baseball League pitcher, a two-time All-Star who hurled and won the decisive game of the 1954 AAGPBL Championship Series for the Kalamazoo Lassies, during what turned out to be the final game in the league's history.
- March 15 – Alice Pollitt, 86, All-American Girls Professional Baseball League infielder, who was a member of three championship clubs and two All-Star teams.
- March 18 – Fred Richards, 88, first baseman for the 1951 Chicago Cubs.
- March 23 – Joe Garagiola, 90, catcher for four teams in a span of nine seasons from 1946 to 1954, who later became a broadcaster, most prominently for NBC. Winner of the Ford C. Frick Award in 1991.
- March 31 – Orlando Álvarez, 64, Puerto Rican backup outfielder who played from 1973 to 1976 with the Los Angeles Dodgers and California Angels.
- March 31 – Tom Butters, 77, relief pitcher who played from 1962 through 1965 for the Pittsburgh Pirates.

=== April ===
- April 1 – Marjorie Peters, 97, one of the sixty original players to join the All-American Girls Professional Baseball League for its inaugural season in 1943, who also earned the distinction of having pitched in the first game ever played in the league.
- April 4 – Mike Sandlock, 100, catcher for the Boston Braves, Brooklyn Dodgers and Pittsburgh Pirates in part of five seasons spanning 1942–1953 who, at the time of his death, was the oldest living former major league ballplayer.
- April 4 – Ted Toles Jr., 90, African American pitcher and outfielder who played in Negro league baseball and the Minor Leagues.
- April 12 – Paul Carey, 88, radio announcer who teamed with Ernie Harwell to call Detroit Tigers games from 1972 to 1991.
- April 12 – Spec Richardson, 93, who served as general manager for the Houston Astros from 1967 through 1975 and for the San Francisco Giants from 1976 to 1980, being named MLB executive of the year while with the Giants in 1978.
- April 14 – Ron Theobald, 72, second baseman who played from 1971 to 1972 for the Milwaukee Brewers.
- April 19 – Milt Pappas, 76, two-time All-Star pitcher in 17 Major League seasons with the Baltimore Orioles, Cincinnati Reds, Atlanta Braves and Chicago Cubs, who came within one pitch of a perfect game on September 2, 1972 against the San Diego Padres at Wrigley Field, giving up a walk to Larry Stahl in a 3–2 count with two outs in the top of the ninth inning, before retiring the next batter to complete the no-hitter.
- April 20 – Harry Perkowski, 93, Cincinnati Reds/Redlegs pitcher and World War II veteran, who hurled a 12-inning, three-hit shutout against the New York Giants at Crosley Field in 1953, led the National League in fielding average as a pitcher in 1951 and 1953, and was also noted as a good-hitting pitcher.
- April 28 – Joe Durham, 84, speedy outfielder for the Chicago American Giants Negro league club, who in 1954 became the first African-American player to hit a home run in Baltimore Orioles history, and later spent over 40 years in the Orioles organization working as the team's batting practice pitcher, as well as serving as a front office executive as community coordinator for baseball operations.

=== May ===
- May 2 – Gordie Sundin, 78, relief pitcher for the 1956 Baltimore Orioles.
- May 3 – Charlie Beamon, 81, pitcher for the Baltimore Orioles in a span of three seasons from 1956 to 1958.
- May 8 – John Young, 67, who spent more than 40 years in baseball as a player, scout and executive, which included a brief stint at first base for the Detroit Tigers in 1971, and created Reviving Baseball in Inner Cities (also known as RBI) with the support of Major League Baseball in 1989, to increase participation in youth baseball and provide a positive activity for kids that would keep them off the mean streets, as the program grew successfully, and is now encompassing over 240 sites around the world.
- May 13 – Sammy Ellis, 75, All-Star pitcher for the Cincinnati Reds in 1965, while going 22–10 with a 3.79 ERA and 15 complete games, who also pitched with the California Angels and Chicago White Sox, and later served as pitching coach for several teams, including the New York Yankees.
- May 13 – Mikio Kudō, 55, outfielder for the Nippon Ham Fighters of Nippon Professional Baseball from 1979 to 1984.
- May 13 – Dick McAuliffe, 76, three-time All-Star middle-infielder and third baseman who played 14 seasons for the Detroit Tigers and was a significant contributor to take them to the 1968 World Series championship.
- May 14 – Ron Henry, 79, a 15-year career Minor League catcher who also played parts of two seasons for the Minnesota Twins in the early 1960s, before becoming a fixture as a jazz crooner performing at Denver nightclubs during 35 years.
- May 15 – Ken Ramos, 48, stand-out outfielder that reached the majors briefly in 1997 with the Houston Astros but was more renowned for his lengthy and productive minor league career.
- May 19 – Jim Ray Hart, 74, All-Star and slugging third baseman who was a staple of the San Francisco Giants infield in the 1960s and early 70s.
- May 20 – Lucille Stone, 90, All-American Girls Professional Baseball League shortstop who played for the Racine Belles and South Bend Blue Sox in the 1945 season.
- May 26 – Lou Grasmick, 91, pitcher for the Philadelphia Phillies in 1948, who later became a successful lumber company executive and renowned philanthropist.
- May 27 – Louise Erickson, 86, AAGPBL pitcher from 1948 through 1950, who was a member of two champion teams and landed on the All-Star team two times.
- May 27 – La Ferne Price, 90, AAGPBL infielder and pitcher, as well as a member of the 1944 Milwaukee Chicks champion team.

=== June ===
- June 2 – Donny Everett, 19, Milwaukee Brewers pitching prospect drafted out of Vanderbilt University in 2015, who died in a drowning accident at a lake in Tennessee.
- June 2 – Lee Pfund, 96, pitcher for the 1945 Brooklyn Dodgers, who at the time of his death was the 10th oldest living former major league player.
- June 6 – Jimmy Williams, 90, Canadian outfielder, coach and manager during a 34-season Minor League career, who also coached in the Major Leagues with the 1975 Houston Astros and for the Baltimore Orioles from 1981 to 1987, a run that included their historic 1983 World Series win.
- June 7 – Rubén Quevedo, 37, Venezuelan starting pitcher for the Chicago Cubs and Milwaukee Brewers during four seasons spanning 2000–2003.
- June 11 – Chico Fernández, 84, Cuban shortstop regarded as the first regular starting Latino player both for the Philadelphia Phillies in 1957 and the Detroit Tigers in 1960, who also had stints with the Brooklyn Dodgers and New York Mets, in a nine-season Major League career that spanned from 1956 to 1965.
- June 17 – Phil Hennigan, 70, relief pitcher for the Cleveland Indians and New York Mets between 1969 and 1973.
- June 18 – Joe Schaffernoth, 78, pitcher who played for the Chicago Cubs and Cleveland Indians in part of three seasons from 1959 to 1961.
- June 25 – Jim Hickman, 79, All-Star outfielder and an original member of the New York Mets in 1962, who also had stints with the Los Angeles Dodgers, Chicago Cubs and St. Louis Cardinals, whose RBI-single led to Pete Rose crashing into catcher Ray Fosse at the plate with the game-winning run in the 1970 MLB All-Star Game.

=== July ===
- July 7 – Tom Marr, 73, radio play-by-play broadcaster for the Baltimore Orioles from 1979 to 1986.
- July 8 – Hal Hudson, 89, relief pitcher for the St. Louis Browns and Chicago White Sox between the 1952 and 1953 seasons.
- July 8 – Turk Lown, 92, pitcher notable for his bullpen role with the Chicago White Sox (1958–1962); led the American League with 15 saves and 37 games finished in 1959, helping the ChiSox clinch the AL pennant for the first time in 40 years; earlier in his career, a member of the Chicago Cubs (1951–1954, 1956–1958) and Cincinnati Redlegs (1958).
- July 9 – Bill Guilfoile, 84, Baseball Hall of Fame public relations director from 1979 through 1996; previously held similar assignments with New York Yankees and Pittsburgh Pirates.
- July 14 – Mike Strahler, 69, pitcher who played from 1970 through 1973 for Los Angeles Dodgers and Detroit Tigers.
- July 16 – Arlene Buszka, 82, All-American Girls Professional Baseball League player.
- July 16 – Gordon Massa, 80, backup catcher who appeared in eight games for the Chicago Cubs in the 1957 and 1958 seasons.
- July 24 – Steve Nagy, 97, pitcher in part of two seasons spanning 1947–1950, who at the time of his death was the seventh oldest living MLB player, as well as the oldest living member of the original American League Washington Senators and the National League Pittsburgh Pirates.
- July 27 – Doug Griffin, 69, Gold Glove second baseman who appeared in 614 games for the Boston Red Sox, whose career was cut short when he was knocked unconscious after being hit in the head by a pitch from Nolan Ryan in 1974.
- July 30 – Alan Brice, 78, relief pitcher who appeared in three games for the Chicago White Sox in its 1961 season.
- July 31 – José Arcia, 72, utility player who played from 1968 to 1970 for the Chicago Cubs and San Diego Padres.

=== August ===
- August 4 – Peggy Cramer, 79, All-American Girls Professional Baseball League catcher who played for the South Bend Blue Sox in the 1954 season.
- August 4 – Robert Ramsay, 42, pitcher for the Seattle Mariners from 1999 to 2000, who had a solid year in the bullpen for the Mariners team that reached the 2000 American League Championship Series.
- August 8 – Mike Brumley, 78, backup catcher who played from 1964 through 1966 for the Washington Senators, and later coached and managed for a long time in the Minor Leagues.
- August 15 – Choo-Choo Coleman, 80, a catcher on the expansion 1962 New York Mets who spent four seasons spanning 1961–1966 in the Major Leagues including a brief stint with the Philadelphia Phillies.
- August 17 – Steve Arlin, 70, pitcher who played six years in the majors from 1969 to 1974, almost all of them for the San Diego Padres, before his career ended after a brief stint with the Cleveland Indians in his last season.
- August 22 – Charlie Sands, 68, backup catcher who played for the New York Yankees, Pittsburgh Pirates, California Angels and Oakland Athletics in part of six seasons from 1967 to 1975.
- August 23 – Bryan Clutterbuck, 56, a three-sport standout athlete at Eastern Michigan University, who later pitched in two different seasons for the Milwaukee Brewers, and also played in their Minor League system during nine years from 1981 to 1989.
- August 24 – Juan Bell, 48, Dominican Republic middle infielder who played for the Baltimore Orioles, Philadelphia Phillies, Milwaukee Brewers, Montreal Expos and Boston Red Sox, in a span of seven seasons from 1989 to 1995.
- August 24 – Neil Berry, 94, middle infielder who played from 1948 through 1954 with the Detroit Tigers, St. Louis Browns, Chicago White Sox, and Baltimore Orioles.
- August 25 – Paul Dade, 64, a first-round pick in the 1970 MLB Draft who played at outfield for the California Angels, Cleveland Indians and San Diego Padres from 1975 to 1980, and also won a batting title in the Pacific League with a .363 average in 1976 and played in Japan with the Hanshin Tigers in 1981.
- August 26 – Joe DeMaestri, 87, slick-fielding shortstop who played for the Chicago White Sox, St. Louis Browns, Philadelphia and Kansas City Athletics, and New York Yankees from 1951 to 1961, and was also a member both of the American League All-Star team in 1957 and the 1961 World Champion Yankees.
- August 26 – Steve Korcheck, 84, part-time catcher for the Washington Senators in part of four seasons spanning 1954–1959.
- August 27 – Leon Everitt, 69, relief pitcher who played briefly for the San Diego Padres during their inaugural 1969 season.

=== September ===
- September 2 – Don Minnick, 85, pitcher who made two appearances for the Washington Senators in their 1957 season.
- September 4 – Bob Bissonnette, 35, Venezuelan-born Canadian co-owner of the Can-Am League's Québec Capitales baseball club.
- September 9 – Carl Miles, 98, pitcher for the 1940 Philadelphia Athletics, who at the time of his death was the second oldest living big leaguer and the oldest living Athletics ballplayer.
- September 14 – Dick Adams, 96, first baseman who played briefly for the Philadelphia Athletics in their 1947 season.
- September 16 – W. P. Kinsella, 81, Canadian author whose novel Shoeless Joe about baseball was the basis for the successful film Field of Dreams.
- September 25 – José Fernández, 24, Cuban-American pitcher for the Miami Marlins, two-time All-Star and 2013 NL Rookie of the Year, who died from injuries sustained in a boating accident in Miami Beach.
- September 28 – Wanita Dokish, 80, All-American Girls Professional Baseball League player.
- September 30 – Jim Zapp, 92, African-American outfielder who played in the Negro leagues and Minor League Baseball from 1945 to 1955, spending the most part of his career with the NL Baltimore Elite Giants and the Paris Lakers of the integrated Mississippi–Ohio Valley League, where he hit .330 during the 1952 season, while leading all hitters with 20 home runs and 136 runs batted in and setting a league's record for the most RBI in a single-season, which still stands intact today.

=== October ===
- October 4 – Gair Allie, 84, middle infielder and third baseman who played for the Pittsburgh Pirates in its 1954 season.
- October 4 – Doug Slaten, 36, relief pitcher who played from 2006 through 2012 for the Arizona Diamondbacks, Washington Nationals and Pittsburgh Pirates.
- October 19 – Joe Kirrene, 85, third baseman who did two brief stints with the Chicago White Sox in the 1950 and 1954 seasons.
- October 19 – Pat Scott, 87, All-American Girls Professional Baseball League pitcher in parts of four seasons spanning 1948–1953.
- October 25 – Filomeno Codiñera, 77, Filipino ballplayer who represented both the men's national softball and baseball teams of the Philippines.
- October 26 – Mark Johnson, 65, umpire who worked in the American League from 1979 to 1999, while working in the 1993 World Series as well as the All-Star Game in 1990 and 1999.

=== November ===
- November 1 – John Orsino, 78, catcher who played from 1961 through 1967 for the San Francisco Giants, Baltimore Orioles and Washington Senators.
- November 2 – Vern Handrahan, 79, Canadian pitcher for the Kansas City Athletics in parts of two seasons spanning 1964–1966.
- November 2 – Dolores Klosowski, 93, All-American Girls Professional Baseball League infielder who played for the Milwaukee Chicks and South Bend Blue Sox from 1944 to 1945.
- November 4 – Eddie Carnett, 100, left fielder for the Boston Braves, Chicago White Sox and Cleveland Indians in a span of three seasons from 1941 to 1945 who, at the time of his death, was the oldest living former major league player.
- November 8 – Marlan Coughtry, 82, backup infielder for the Boston Red Sox, Cleveland Indians, Los Angeles Angels and Kansas City Athletics in part of two seasons from 1960 to 1962.
- November 8 – Russ Nixon, 81, catcher who played with the Cleveland Indians, Boston Red Sox and Minnesota Twins in a span of 12 seasons from 1957 to 1968, and later managed the Cincinnati Reds in 1982 and 1983 and the Atlanta Braves from 1988 through 1990.
- November 13 – Randy Veres, 50, relief pitcher for the Milwaukee Brewers, Chicago Cubs, Florida Marlins, Detroit Tigers and Kansas City Royals in a span of 6 seasons from 1989 to 1997.
- November 15 – Bob Addis, 91, backup outfielder for the Boston Braves, Chicago Cubs and Pittsburgh Pirates in 208 games from 1950 to 1953, who later worked as a baseball coach and athletic director at Euclid High School in Ohio, leading the team to a state championship in 1963.
- November 23 – Ralph Branca, 90, three-time All-Star pitcher who played 12 seasons in the majors, mostly with the Brooklyn Dodgers, also known as the man who gave up a pitch hit for a home run by Bobby Thomson that won the 1951 National League pennant for the New York Giants.
- November 24 – Dave 'Boo' Ferriss, 94, All-Star pitcher for the Boston Red Sox in six seasons from 1945 to 1950, who posted a 25–6 record with a 3.25 ERA in 1946, helping lead the team to the World Series.
- November 26 – Bill Endicott, 98, left fielder who appeared in 20 games for the St. Louis Cardinals in their 1946 World Championship season, as well as the oldest living former member of the Cardinals at the time of his death.

=== December ===
- December 1 – Helen Ketola, 85, All-American Girls Professional Baseball League player.
- December 4 – Hiroshi Arakawa, 86, Japanese outfielder who played from 1953 through 1961 for the Mainichi/Daimai Orions of NPB.
- December 4 – Stuart Locklin, 88, backup outfielder for the Cleveland Indians in part of two seasons from 1955 to 1956.
- December 8 – Putsy Caballero, 89, backup infielder for the Philadelphia Phillies in a span of eight seasons from 1944 to 1952 and a member of the Whiz Kids Era, whose debut at age 16 makes him the youngest player to ever appear at third base in a Major League game.
- December 19 – Phil Gagliano, 74, backup infielder/outfielder for the St. Louis Cardinals, Cincinnati Reds, Boston Red Sox and Chicago Cubs from 1963 to 1974, as well as a member of St. Louis teams that won World Series titles in 1964 and 1967.
- December 23 – Jim Lehew, 79, relief pitcher who played from 1961 to 1962 for the Baltimore Orioles.
- December 24 – John Barfield, 52, middle relief pitcher for the Texas Rangers during three seasons from 1989 to 1991.
- December 25 – Johnny Rutherford, 91, Canadian pitcher for the 1952 National League Champion Brooklyn Dodgers.
- December 30 – Chris Cannizzaro, 78, catcher and an original New York Mets in their inaugural 1962 season, who was also an original member of the San Diego Padres in its 1969 inaugural season, and earned Padres' first All-Star berth the same year.
