= Sylvia Wronski =

- Pitcher
- Born: December 2, 1924; Milwaukee, Wisconsin, U.S.
- Died: November 28, 1997 (aged 72); Milwaukee, Wisconsin, U.S.
- Batted: Right Threw: Right

Teams
- Milwaukee Chicks (1944); Grand Rapids Chicks (1945)

Sylvia Wronski [Straka] (December 2, 1924 – November 28, 1997) was a pitcher who played for parts of two seasons in the All-American Girls Professional Baseball League (AAGPBL). Listed at 5 ft 2 in (1.57 m), 140 lb., she batted and threw right-handed.

Wronski was a member of the 1944 Milwaukee Chicks champion team. As a pitcher, she served alternatively as a long reliever, a starter, and a closer.

Born in Milwaukee, Wisconsin, Sylvia was one of seven children into the family of John and Anna Wronski. She was reared in a working-class family marked by hard work for a modest income. Her father labored as a machinist, while her mother was a devoted homemaker. At an early age, Sylvia accustomed to play football with her three older brothers, taking the arms, legs and heads off her dolls, in order to use the body as a kickball. She attended grade school at St. Casimir and high school at Milwaukee Riverside, where she finally started playing organized softball for the school team before going on to play in local leagues.

In May 1944, Wronski attended an AAGPBL tryout held at Borchert Field in Milwaukee. She then went to the spring training in Peru, Illinois, and was chosen to pitch on her hometown team. After that, she was sent to the West Allis league for extended training and debuted with the Chicks in late June. Wronski joined Vivian Anderson on the team, making them the only two Milwaukee natives to play for their hometown Chicks.

The Milwaukee team, managed by experienced Max Carey, had a strong pitching rotation headed by Josephine Kabick, Viola Thompson and Connie Wisniewski. Together, the trio would combine to collect 64 of the 70 victories of the team in the regular season. Wronski and Clara Cook pitched occasionally and both did a good job coming out of the bullpen.

Wronski made her AAGPBL debut, pitching a scoreless final inning during an 8–2 loss to the Racine Belles at Borchert Field. ״Ronie״, as her teammates nicknamed her, finished with a 4–2 record and a 3.06 earned run average in 13 pitching appearances, including four complete games and 53 innings of work.

Though not a regular starter, during the midseason Wronski came within one out of hurling a no-hitter against the Racine Belles, during a shortened seven-inning first game of a doubleheader. After retiring the first two Belles hitters in their last at-bat, she allowed a single to Edythe Perlick, who eventually scored an unearned run following two fielding errors. The final score was 4–1, while she was credited with the victory. Amazingly, the durable Wronski started the next day and beat the Belles again, 8–2, allowing seven hits in a nine-inning, complete game.

Milwaukee won the pennant and defeated the Kenosha Comets in the championship series. Although the Chicks won the champion title, they had no local financial backing and could not compete with the American Association Milwaukee Brewers. In fact, the Chicks were forced to play all seven games of the series at Kenosha's Lake Front Stadium, because the Brewers were using Borchert Field for their league playoffs. In addition, the high ticket prices charged for AAGPBL games failed to encourage significant fan support. Due to lack of community support and skepticism of journalists, the team moved to Grand Rapids, Michigan prior to the 1945 season and was renamed Grand Rapids Chicks.

Wronski accompanied the Chicks in Grand Rapids. She pitched in only four games and did not have a decision before being released during the season. She has the distinction of having pitched in the last Chicks game played at Borchert Field, on September 3, 1944. She threw a nine-inning, complete game six-hitter for a 4–2 win against Kenosha.

Sylvia married Edward Straka in 1947. The couple fostered three children – Donald, Christine and Theresa –, before Edward died of cancer in 1954 at age 29. She then had to raise her children alone while working in different jobs. As a single mother in the 1950s, she became a waitress and bowling alley cleaner in order to be home when her children were. She later worked as a factory machine operator at Cutler-Hammer (eight years) and Briggs & Stratton (21 years), often juggling three jobs at once.

After retiring in 1990, she stayed physically fit later in life, playing bowling in two leagues, walking daily, and participating in water aerobics. In addition, she visited local Little League Baseball games and played catch with young ballplayers. Besides this, she stayed in her hometown and watched over her six grandchildren and five great-grandchildren.

She is part of Women in Baseball, a permanent display based at the Baseball Hall of Fame and Museum in Cooperstown, New York, which was unveiled in 1988 to honor the entire All-American Girls Professional Baseball League. I was the tomboy who made good, as she described herself in an interview. Sylvia, whose childhood home was only nine blocks from Borchert Field, added that Whoever would have guessed that a grubby kid from Hubbard Street would end up at Cooperstown?

Sylvia Wronski Straka died of a respiratory failure in 1997, four days short of her 73rd birthday. She is buried at Holy Cross Cemetery in Milwaukee.

== Career statistics ==
Pitching

GP	W	L	W-L%	ERA	IP	H	RA	ER	BB	SO	HBP	WP	WHIP
17	4	2	.667	2.53	64	44	33	18	30	2	1	2	0.83

Batting

GP	AB	R	H	2B	3B	HR	RBI	SB	BB	SO	BA	OBP
17	22	1	1	0	0	0	0	3	2	10	.045	.125

Fielding

GP	PO	A	E	TC	DP	FA
17	8	23	7	38	0	.816
