= Olga Grant =

Canadian baseball player

- Outfielder
- Born: Calgary, Alberta, Canada
- Bats: Left Throws: Right

Career statistics
- Batting average: .247
- Hits: 18
- Runs batted in: 6

Teams
- Milwaukee Chicks (1944)

Career highlights and awards
- AAGPBL champion (1944)

Olga Grant was a Canadian outfielder who played in the All-American Girls Professional Baseball League (AAGPBL). She batted left handed and threw right handed.

Born in Calgary, Alberta, Olga Grant was one of the 68 players born in Canada to join the All American League in its twelve-year history. Olga appeared in 21 games for the 1944 pennant-winning Milwaukee Chicks.

She posted a batting average of .247 (18-for-73) with a double and nine stolen bases, driving in six runs while scoring six more. At the outfield, she recorded 17 putouts and committed one error in 18 total chances for a .944 fielding average.

In 1988, Grant received further recognition when she became part of Women in Baseball, a permanent display based at the Baseball Hall of Fame and Museum in Cooperstown, New York which was unveiled to honor the entire All-American Girls Professional Baseball League. She also gained honorary induction into the Canadian Baseball Hall of Fame in 1998.

== Career statistics ==
Batting

GP	AB	R	H	2B	3B	HR	RBI	SB	TB	BB	SO	BA	OBP	SLG	OPS
21	73	6	18	1	0	0	6	9	19	7	6	.247	.313	.260	.573
