= Josephine Figlo =

American baseball player

- Outfielder
- Born: April 9, 1923; Milltown, New Jersey, U.S.
- Died: August 26, 2011 (aged 88); Sayreville, New Jersey, U.S.
- Batted: Right Threw: Right

Career statistics
- Batting average: .059
- Hits: 2
- Runs batted in: 3

Teams
- Racine Belles (1944); Milwaukee Chicks (1944)

Josephine Gill (née Figlo; April 9, 1923 – August 26, 2011) was an All-American Girls Professional Baseball League ballplayer. Listed at 5' 3", 140 lb., she batted and threw right-handed.

== History ==
Born in Milltown, New Jersey, Josephine Figlo was a light-hitting outfielder for two teams in the early years of the All-American League. She entered the league in 1944 with the Racine Belles and then was traded to the Milwaukee Chicks during the midseason.

In a 15-game career, Figlo posted a batting average of .059 (2-for-34) with a double and four stolen bases, driving in three runs while scoring seven times. In the outfield, she recorded 11 putouts and committed four errors in 15 chances for a .733 fielding average.

In 1988, a permanent display at the Baseball Hall of Fame and Museum at Cooperstown, New York was inaugurated that honors those who were part of the All-American Girls Professional Baseball League. Josephine Figlo, along with the rest of the girls and the league staff, is included at the display/exhibit.

== Career statistics ==
Batting

GP	AB	R	H	2B	3B	HR	RBI	SB	TB	BB	SO	BA	OBP	SLG	OPS
15	34	7	2	1	0	0	3	4	3	4	13	.059	.158	.088	.246

Fielding

GP	PO	A	E	TC	DP	FA
11	11	0	4	15	0	.733
