= Emily Stevenson =

- Catcher / Outfielder
- Born: July 26, 1925; Champaign, Illinois, U.S.
- Died: December 30, 2012 (aged 87); Mesa, Arizona, U.S.
- Batted: Right Threw: Right

Teams
- Milwaukee Chicks (1944)

Career highlights and awards
- AAGPBL champion (1944)

Emily Stevenson (July 26, 1925 – December 30, 2012) was a former utility who played in the All-American Girls Professional Baseball League (AAGPBL). Listed at 5 ft 7 in (1.70 m), 160 lb, she batted and threw right-handed.

A native of Champaign, Illinois, Emily Stevenson helped the Milwaukee Chicks win the regular season pennant and the championship title during their 1944 season. In her only year in the league, she served as a backup catcher for incumbent Dorothy Maguire and also patrolled the outfield for the Chicks.

Stevenson forms part of Women in Baseball, a permanent display based at the Baseball Hall of Fame and Museum in Cooperstown, New York, which was unveiled in 1988 to honor the entire All-American Girls Professional Baseball League.

== Career statistics ==
Batting

GP	AB	R	H	2B	3B	HR	RBI	SB	BB	SO	BA	OBP
32	74	12	12	0	0	0	5	3	12	8	.162	.279

Fielding

GP	PO	A	E	TC	DP	FA
29	27	11	2	40	3	.950
