= Vivian Anderson (baseball) =

- Third base
- Born: April 21, 1921; Milwaukee, Wisconsin, U.S.
- Died: December 21, 2012 (aged 91); Brookfield, Wisconsin, U.S.
- Batted: Right Threw: Right

Career statistics
- Batting average: .147
- Hits: 5
- Runs batted in: 1

Teams
- Milwaukee Chicks (1944)

Career highlights and awards
- AAGPBL champion (1944)

Vivian Anderson [Sheriffs] (April 21, 1921 – December 21, 2012) was an infielder who played in the All-American Girls Professional Baseball League (AAGPBL) during the 1944 season. Listed at 5 ft 2 in (1.57 m), 140 lb., she batted and threw right-handed.

Born in Milwaukee, Wisconsin, she played with her hometown Milwaukee Chicks in their championship season. Unfortunately, she severely injured two fingers of her throwing hand that shortened her playing career in her rookie year.

== Early life ==
At the age of 13, Vivian began playing softball in a league which required its players to be 16. "I cheated on my age a little," she admitted in an interview. She attended West Division High School in Milwaukee, where she played in the school baseball and basketball teams. In 1942, she married Daniel Anderson, her assistant coach, just when she turned 21 years old. They were married for just four years.

== Pro career ==
She was spotted by AAGPBL scouts while playing in a Milwaukee league, and sent her an invitation to the league's spring training camp at Peru, Illinois.

״Andy״, as her teammates nicknamed her, tried out at third base and learned the skills of the game from Chicks' manager Max Carey, to become the first player from her hometown on the Milwaukee team. The strong-armed third sacker was later joined by pitcher Sylvia Wronski, making them the only two Milwaukee natives to play for their hometown Chicks.

On May 27, 1944, Anderson started at third base and batted eighth in the order during the Chicks’ inaugural game at Borchert Field, a home contest. She scored the first-ever Chicks’ run, after reaching base on an infield single, in a 5–4, 11-inning loss to the South Bend Blue Sox. But her baseball career ended abruptly in a round trip during her 11th game of the season. The ball, the base and the runner all came together at the same time, she explained. As a result, she fractured her index and middle fingers on her right hand. A doctor advised immediate amputation of her fingers, but another said he could fix them. She would choose the second option, being replaced in the Chicks roster by Doris Tetzlaff.

Milwaukee clinched the 1944 AAGPBL title with a best-of-seven series victory over the Kenosha Comets. Always a team player who wanted to support her manager and teammates, Anderson accompanied the Chicks to all seven of those games played at Kenosha's Lake Front Stadium, because the Milwaukee Brewers were using Borchert Field for their American Association league playoffs.

== Post baseball ==
After healing, Anderson moved to Chicago and played for the National Girls Baseball League Chicago Bluebirds for the next two years. She then returned to her hometown, eventually landing with the semi-professional Milwaukee Jets. She divorced her husband after World War II and worked for Allied Van Lines moving company in office management, the secretarial field, public relations, loan closing, dispatching, and credit/collections. At age 83, she worked part-time in an office, namely for a national furniture mover, Barrett Moving and Storage Co., agent for United Van Lines, just to keep busy, before retiring in 2010 at the age of 89.

In her spare time, Anderson continued to be active in sports playing field hockey and basketball. Also a talented bowler for 50 years, she belonged to the local 600 club.

She is part of Women in Baseball, a permanent display based at the Baseball Hall of Fame and Museum in Cooperstown, New York, which was unveiled in 1988 to honor the entire All-American Girls Professional Baseball League. Besides this, in 2001 she was honored by having her name added to the Wall of Honor inside Miller Park, home of the National League Milwaukee Brewers, during what turned out to be the first induction in the ballpark. The same year she participated in the SABR convention held in Milwaukee.

She never left her hometown area and continued to live in her own home as late as 2012. Sheriffs died on December 21, 2012 at a Brookfield nursing home of a respiratory illness.

== Career statistics ==
Batting

GP	AB	R	H	2B	3B	HR	RBI	SB	BB	SO	BA	OBP	SLG
11	34	3	5	0	0	0	1	1	6	1	.147	.275	.147

Fielding

GP	PO	A	E	TC	DP	FA
10	22	22	7	51	1	.863
