= Dolores Klosowski =

- First base
- Born: April 28, 1923; Detroit, Michigan, U.S.
- Died: November 2, 2016 (aged 93); Clinton Township, Michigan, U.S.
- Batted: Left Threw: Left

Teams
- Milwaukee Chicks (1944); South Bend Blue Sox (1945)

Career highlights and awards
- Champion team member (1944); Women in Baseball – AAGPBL Permanent Display at Baseball Hall of Fame and Museum (1988)

Dolores Marion Klosowski (April 28, 1923 – November 2, 2016) was an American infielder who played from 1944 through 1945 in the All-American Girls Professional Baseball League (AAGPBL). Listed at 5 ft 4 in (1.63 m), 134 lb, she batted and threw left-handed.

A member of a champion team, Dolores Klosowski had a brief career in the All-American Girls Professional Baseball League after she fractured a leg during her rookie season and never fully recovered.

Born in Detroit, Michigan, Klosowski used to catch fly balls when she was a child before breaking into a local league at age 16. During World War II she played for several industrial teams sponsored by companies, which included the Buddy Pizza, Hudson Motor, Roman Cleaners and Eastside Sports squads. She started out as a left-handed shortstop, but also played at right field and first base.

She was spotted by an AAGPBL scout while playing a game at Mack Park. She then was invited to a tryout at Wrigley Field in Chicago, and immediately was assigned to the expansion Milwaukee Chicks for the 1944 season.

Klosowski hit a .222 average in 20 games as a member of the Chicks during their 1944 championship year, even though she was unable to play in the postseason after breaking a leg during a game. She also played with the South Bend Blue Sox the next year, filling in at first and second. She batted .169 in 19 games, before being released in the midseason.

Following her baseball career Klosowski worked in different jobs. Later as a retiree, she became an avid bowler and golfer. She is part of Women in Baseball, a permanent display based at the Baseball Hall of Fame and Museum in Cooperstown, New York, which was unveiled in 1988 to honor the entire All-American Girls Professional Baseball League.

At age 93, Klosowski was one of the oldest living former AAGPBL players. She resided in Sterling Heights, Michigan, and died on November 2, 2016, at a hospital in Clinton Township, Macomb County, Michigan.

== Career statistics ==
Batting

| GP | AB | R | H | 2B | 3B | HR | RBI | SB | TB | BB | SO | BA | OBP | SLG |
|---|---|---|---|---|---|---|---|---|---|---|---|---|---|---|
| 39 | 137 | 8 | 27 | 2 | 0 | 0 | 16 | 10 | 29 | 12 | 15 | .197 | .262 | .212 |

Fielding

| GP | PO | A | E | TC | DP | FA |
|---|---|---|---|---|---|---|
| 37 | 390 | 16 | 15 | 421 | 19 | .964 |
