= Hiroshi Arakawa =

Japanese baseball player

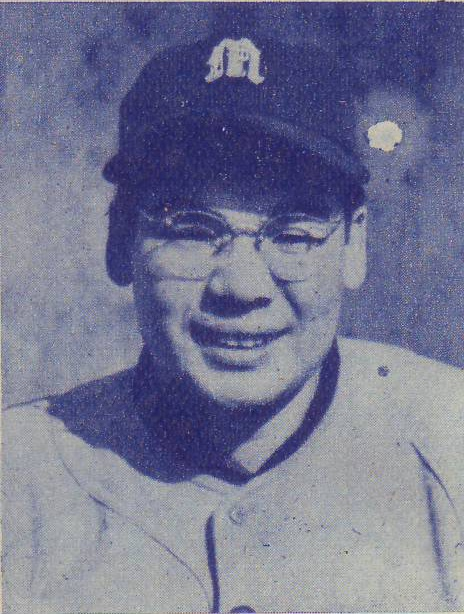
- Outfielder
- Born: August 6, 1930
- Died: December 4, 2016 (aged 86)
- Batted: Right Threw: Right

PBL debut
- 1953, for the Mainichi Orions

Last PBL appearance
- 1961, for the Daimai Orions

PBL statistics
- Games played: 802
- At bats: 2005
- hits: 503
- HRs: 16
- RBIs: 172

Teams
- As player: Mainichi Orions/Daimai Orions (1953–1961); As manager: Yakult Swallows (1974–1976)

Hiroshi Arakawa (荒川 博, Arakawa Hiroshi; August 6, 1930 – December 4, 2016) was a Japanese professional baseball player. From 1953 to 1961, he played in the Pacific League as an outfielder for the Mainichi Orions (later renamed the Daimai Orions), batting .251 with 503 hits, 16 home runs and 172 RBIs.

After retiring as a player, he was a batting coach for the Yomiuri Giants and, later, a manager of the Yakult Swallows in the early 1970s.

Arakawa died on December 4, 2016, after suffering a cardiac arrest.
