= Milwaukee Chicks =

- (1944); Milwaukee, Wisconsin
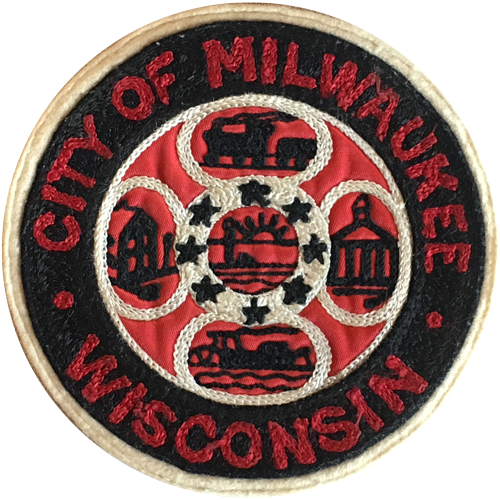

Team logo	Cap insignia

Minor league affiliations
- Previous leagues: All-American Girls Professional Baseball League

Minor league titles
- League titles: 1944

Team data
- Name: Brewettes, Schnitts
- Colors: Black, red, gold, gray
- Previous parks: Borchert Field
- Owner/ Operator: AAGPBL

The Milwaukee Chicks were a women's professional baseball team which played in the All-American Girls Professional Baseball League (AAGPBL) during the 1944 season. They were managed by Max Carey, former star player for the Pittsburgh Pirates and Brooklyn Robins and a future Hall of Famer.

They were also known colloquially as the "Brewettes", after the city's established baseball team, and the "Schnitts" (a term for glass of beer served half-full).

== History ==
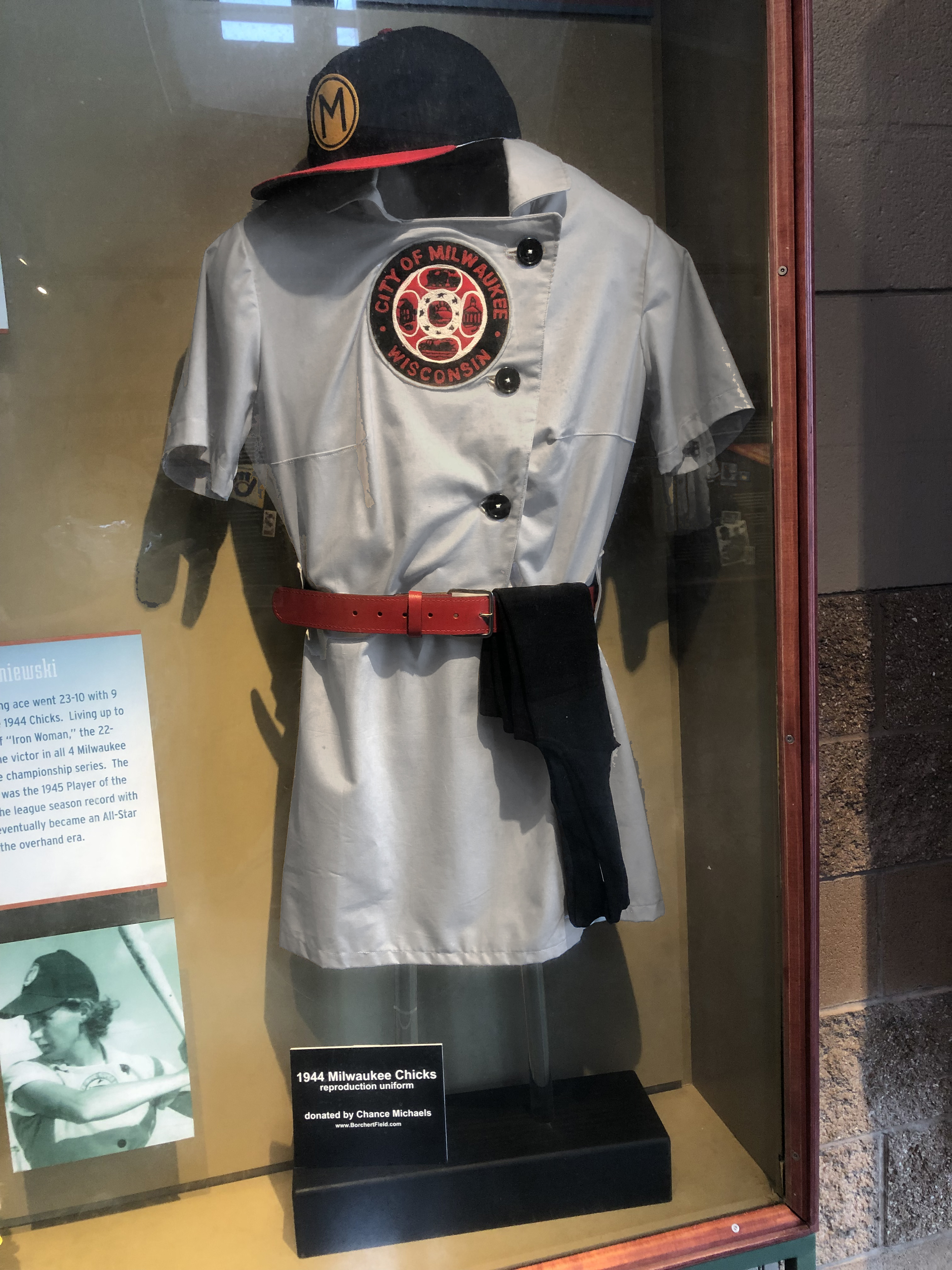
Reproduction 1944 Milwaukee Chicks uniform on display at Miller Park

By 1944 the AAGPBL added the Milwaukee Chicks and the Minneapolis Millerettes to the league's roster. The Chicks were a balanced squad that counted such talented players as Josephine Kabick, Merle Keagle, Connie Wisniewski and Alma Ziegler. With Max Carey at the helm, the Chicks led the league in runs scored (492), batting average (.207), stolen bases (739) and tied for first in home runs (12). The best offensive support came from Keagle, who hit .264 with 47 runs batted in, and led the AAGPBL hitters with seven home runs and 145 total bases. The one-two pitching staff was led by Kabick, who posted a 26–19 record for a .578 winning percentage and topped the league in wins and innings pitched (366), while Wisniewski went 23-10 (.697) with a 2.23 earned run average. A daring base runner, Ziegler established herself at second base as a flashy defender who made outstandings plays routinely, being considered the spark plug of the team.

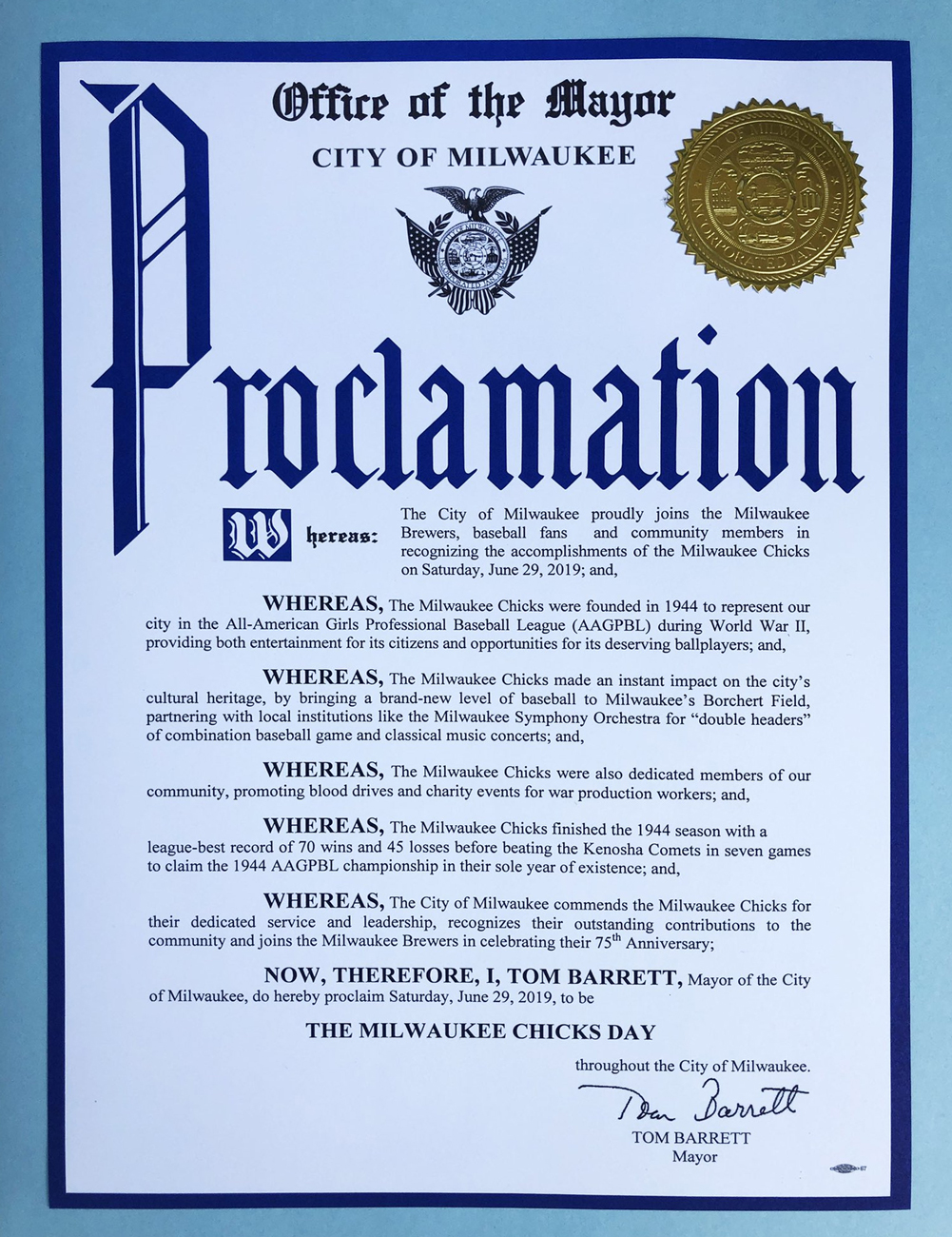
Proclamation from Milwaukee Mayor Tom Barrett announcing Saturday, June 29, 2019, as "The Milwaukee Chicks Day".

The Chicks went 30–26 in the first half of the year, but dominated the second half (40-19) and had the best overall record (70-45). They then went on to win the Championship Title, beating the Kenosha Comets in the postseason. During the seven-game series Wisniewski went 4–1 with a 0.40 ERA in five complete games, including two shutouts, two one-run games and one two-run game, winning three of four matchups with Kenosha's Helen Nicol, who finished with a 17–11 mark (.607) and had led the league with a minuscule 0.93 ERA.

Although the Chicks won the AAGPBL championship title, they had no local financial backing and could not compete with the American Association Milwaukee Brewers. In fact, the Chicks were forced to play all seven games of the series at Kenosha's Lake Front Stadium because the Brewers were using the Borchert Field in Milwaukee. In addition, the high ticket prices charged for AAGPBL games failed to encourage significant fan support. Due to lack of community support and skepticism of journalists, the Chicks moved to Grand Rapids, Michigan, prior to the 1945 season.

On August 27, 2000, the surviving Chicks were honored by the Milwaukee Brewers before a game against the San Diego Padres.

The Brewers celebrated the Chicks' 75th Anniversary in 2019 with a special theme night, including a reproduction 1944 baseball cap giveaway. Mayor Tom Barrett declared the same day, June 29, 2019, as "The Milwaukee Chicks Day" throughout the city of Milwaukee.

Tributes to the club may be found in American Family Field.

== All-time roster ==
1944 Milwaukee Chicks Photo: AAGPBL files Back, L-R: Max Carey, Thelma Eisen, Merle Keagle, Emily Stevenson, Vickie Panos, Clara Cook. Middle, L-R: Dottie Hunter, Dorothy Maguire, Vivian Anderson, Sylvia Wronski, Alma Ziegler, Dolores Klosowski. Front, L-R: Josephine Kabick, Betty Whiting, Viola Thompson.

- Vivian Anderson Third base
- Kay Blumetta Outfield / First base
- Max Carey Manager
- Clara Cook Pitcher
- Gladys Davis Shortstop / Outfield
- Thelma Eisen Outfield
- Josephine Figlo Outfield
- Olga Grant Outfield
- Dottie Hunter Chaperon
- Josephine Kabick Pitcher
- Marie Kazmierczak Outfield
- Merle Keagle Outfield / Third base/ Pitcher
- Dolores Klosowski First base / Pitcher
- Dorothy Maguire Catcher / Outfield
- Vickie Panos Outfield
- Ernestine Petras Shortstop
- LaFerne Price Infield / Pitcher
- Shirley Schulze Outfield
- Mary Shastal Second base
- Emily Stevenson Catcher / Outfield
- Doris Tetzlaff Third base
- Viola Thompson Pitcher
- Betty Whiting First base / Catcher / Outfield
- Connie Wisniewski Pitcher / Outfield
- Sylvia Wronski Pitcher
- Alma Ziegler Second base / Pitcher / Shortstop

== See also ==
- History of professional baseball in Milwaukee
