= La Ferne Price =

American baseball player

- Infielder/Pitcher
- Born: January 26, 1926; Butte, Montana, US
- Died: May 27, 2016 (aged 90); Terre Haute, Indiana, US
- Batted: Right Threw: Right

Teams
- Milwaukee Chicks (1944)

Career highlights and awards
- AAGPBL Championship Team (1944); Women in Baseball – AAGPBL Permanent Display at Baseball Hall of Fame and Museum (1988); National Girls and Women’s Sports Hall of Fame induction (1993); Indiana State University Athletics Hall of Fame induction (1998)

La Ferne Ellis Price (January 26, 1926 – May 27, 2016) was an infielder and pitcher who played in the All-American Girls Professional Baseball League (AAGPBL) during the 1944 season. Price batted and threw right handed. After entering the league, she started to be known simply as 'Ferne', a moniker that she proudly used throughout her life.

Born in Butte, Montana, to James Frederick Price and Cornelia Elizabeth Suzanna "Cora" Smit, Price was a long-time resident of Terre Haute, Indiana, where she graduated from Wiley High School in 1944.

Price joined the league with the Milwaukee Chicks club, which was managed by Max Carey, also a Terre Haute native as well as a former Major League Baseball player and manager and future Baseball Hall of Fame member. Price made only four game appearances for the Chicks, who won the 1944 AAGPBL championship title after defeating the Kenosha Comets in seven games.

Following her brief baseball career, Price received a degree in physical education from Indiana State University in 1948 and a master's degree in 1956, where she served as physical instructor as well as softball and swimming coach in the women's squads before retiring in 1989 after 23 years of service. A short time after her retirement, the dedication of Price to softball was recognized by ISU renaming its home softball field to Ferne Price Field.

Other of her most significant accomplishments included The Caleb Mills Distinguished Teaching Award from ISU in 1987, The Girls and Women's Sport Presidential Citation in 1983, and inductions into the National Girls and Women's Sports Hall of Fame in 1993 and the Indiana State University Athletics Hall of Fame in 1998.

In between, Price earned a Doctorate of Philosophy from University of Iowa in 1970. On her journey through academia, she authored The Wonder of Motion: A Sense of Life for Woman; a book about women's mental and physical commitments in all facets of sport, which was released in 1970 and reedited in 1983.

The AAGPBL folded in 1954, but there is now a permanent display at the Baseball Hall of Fame and Museum at Cooperstown, New York since November 5, 1988 that honors those who were part of this unique experience. Price, along with the rest of the league's girls, is included at the display/exhibit.

Ferne Price died in 2016 in Terre Haute, Indiana, at the age of 90.

Ferne also has an infamous first cousin, Perry Edward Smith, one of two men who killed the Clutter family in Kansas. They are related through Price's mother, Cora, who was the sister of Perry's father, John "Tex" Smith.
