= 1945 Philadelphia Phillies season =

Major League Baseball season

1945 Philadelphia Phillies
- Also known as the Philadelphia Blue Jays
- League: National League
- Ballpark: Shibe Park
- City: Philadelphia, Pennsylvania
- Owners: R. R. M. Carpenter
- General managers: Herb Pennock
- Managers: Freddie Fitzsimmons, Ben Chapman
- Radio: WIBG (By Saam, Claude Haring, Doug Arthur)

The 1945 Philadelphia Phillies season was the 63rd season in the history of the franchise.

== Offseason ==
- September 19, 1944: Freddie Fitzsimmons' managerial contract was extended for 1945.
- February 11, 1945: Jimmie Foxx was signed as a free agent by the Phillies.
- Prior to 1945 season (exact date unknown)
  - Tommy Lasorda was signed as an amateur free agent by the Phillies.
  - Carl Sawatski was signed as an amateur free agent by the Phillies.

== Regular season ==
=== Season standings ===
National League
Team	W	L	Pct.	GB	Home	Road
Chicago Cubs	98	56	.636	—	49‍–‍26	49‍–‍30
St. Louis Cardinals	95	59	.617	3	48‍–‍29	47‍–‍30
Brooklyn Dodgers	87	67	.565	11	48‍–‍30	39‍–‍37
Pittsburgh Pirates	82	72	.532	16	45‍–‍34	37‍–‍38
New York Giants	78	74	.513	19	47‍–‍30	31‍–‍44
Boston Braves	67	85	.441	30	36‍–‍38	31‍–‍47
Cincinnati Reds	61	93	.396	37	36‍–‍41	25‍–‍52
Philadelphia Phillies	46	108	.299	52	22‍–‍55	24‍–‍53

=== Record vs. opponents ===
1945 National League record Sources:
Team	BSN	BRO	CHC	CIN	NYG	PHI	PIT	STL
Boston	—	9–13–1	7–15	10–12	10–10–2	14–8	7–15	10–12
Brooklyn	13–9–1	—	8–14–1	11–11	15–7	19–3	12–10	9–13
Chicago	15–7	14–8–1	—	21–1	11–11	17–5	14–8	6–16
Cincinnati	12–10	11–11	1–21	—	6–16	12–10	10–12	9–13
New York	10–10–2	7–15	11–11	16–6	—	17–5	11–11	6–16
Philadelphia	8–14	3–19	5–17	10–12	5–17	—	6–16	9–13
Pittsburgh	15–7	10–12	8–14	12–10	11–11	16–6	—	10–12–1
St. Louis	12–10	13–9	16–6	13–9	16–6	13–9	12–10–1	—

=== Notable transactions ===
- May 8, 1945: Buster Adams was traded by the Phillies to the St. Louis Cardinals for Glenn Crawford and John Antonelli.

=== Roster ===
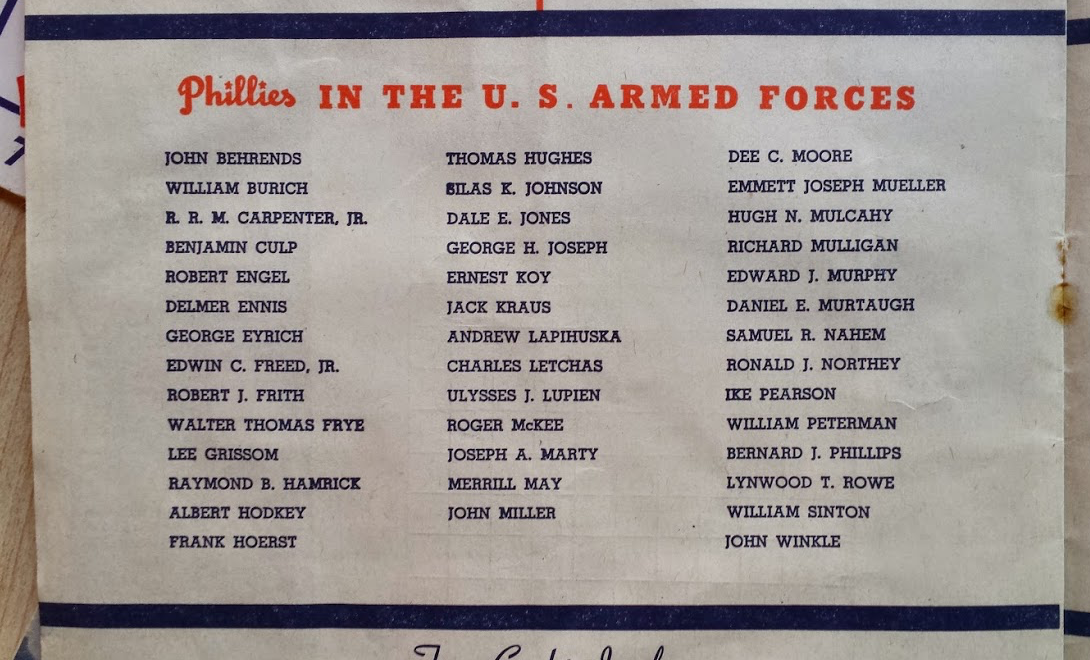
1945 Phillies program listing team members serving in World War II

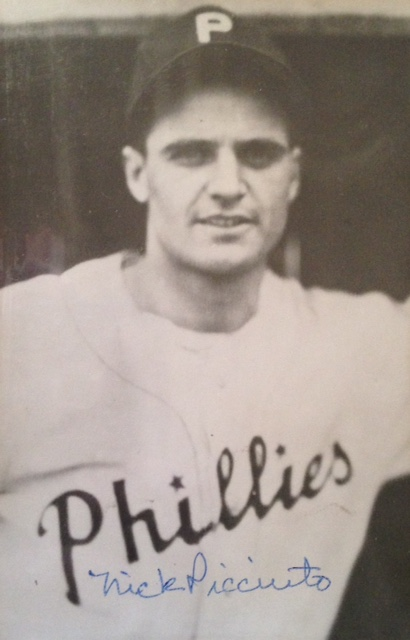
Infielder Nick Picciuto, who played in 36 games for Phils during the wartime 1945 season

1945 Philadelphia Phillies
Roster
Pitchers: 12 Dick Barrett; 34 Mitch Chetkovich; 20 Dick Coffman; 37 Don Grate; 29 Oscar Judd; 33,23,11 Andy Karl; 19 Vern Kennedy; 19 Jack Kraus; 17 Bill Lee; 31 Izzy León; 36 Lou Lucier; 15 Dick Mauney; 17 Hugh Mulcahy; 15 Ken Raffensberger; 35 Charlie Ripple; 16 Charley Schanz; 36 Lefty Scott; 18 Charlie Sproull; 11,10 Whit Wyatt	Catchers: 32 Stan Andrews; 9 Gus Mancuso; 10,8 Johnny Peacock; 24 Andy Seminick; 10 Hal Spindel; Infielders: 32,2 John Antonelli; 28 Putsy Caballero; 6 Tony Daniels; 8 Wally Flager; 4 Jimmie Foxx; 8 Garvin Hamner; 33 Granny Hamner; 33 Don Hasenmayer; 21 Heinie Heltzel; -- Tony Lupien; 1 Bitsy Mott; 1 Nick Picciuto; 8 Ed Walczak	Outfielders: 2 Buster Adams; 34 Ben Chapman; 28,23 Glenn Crawford; 7 Vince DiMaggio; 5 Vance Dinges; 37 Nick Goulish; 22 René Monteagudo; 36 Jake Powell; 27 Coaker Triplett; 3 Jimmy Wasdell	Manager: 34 Ben Chapman; 14 Freddie Fitzsimmons; Coaches: 26 Chuck Klein; 25 Merv Shea

== Player stats ==
=== Batting ===
==== Starters by position ====
Note: Pos = Position; G = Games played; AB = At bats; H = Hits; Avg. = Batting average; HR = Home runs; RBI = Runs batted in

Pos	Player	G	AB	H	Avg.	HR	RBI
C	Gus Mancuso	70	176	35	.199	0	16
1B	Jimmy Wasdell	134	500	150	.300	7	60
2B	Tony Daniels	76	230	46	.200	0	10
SS	Bitsy Mott	90	289	64	.221	0	22
3B	John Antonelli	125	504	129	.256	1	28
OF	Coaker Triplett	120	363	87	.240	7	46
OF	Vince DiMaggio	127	452	116	.257	19	84
OF	Vance Dinges	109	397	114	.287	1	36

==== Other batters ====
Note: G = Games played; AB = At bats; H = Hits; Avg. = Batting average; HR = Home runs; RBI = Runs batted in

Player	G	AB	H	Avg.	HR	RBI
Glenn Crawford	82	302	89	.295	2	24
Jimmie Foxx	89	224	60	.268	7	38
René Monteagudo	114	193	58	.301	0	15
Andy Seminick	80	188	45	.239	6	26
Jake Powell	48	173	40	.231	1	14
Wally Flager	49	168	42	.250	2	15
Garvin Hamner	32	101	20	.198	0	5
Nick Picciuto	36	89	12	.135	0	6
Hal Spindel	36	87	20	.230	0	8
Johnny Peacock	33	74	15	.203	0	6
Ed Walczak	20	57	12	.211	0	2
Buster Adams	14	56	13	.232	2	8
Tony Lupien	15	54	17	.315	0	3
Ben Chapman	24	51	16	.314	0	4
Granny Hamner	14	41	7	.171	0	6
Stan Andrews	13	33	11	.333	1	6
Don Hasenmayer	5	18	2	.111	0	1
Nick Goulish	13	11	3	.273	0	2
Putsy Caballero	9	1	0	.000	0	1

=== Pitching ===
==== Starting pitchers ====
Note: G = Games pitched; IP = Innings pitched; W = Wins; L = Losses; ERA = Earned run average; SO = Strikeouts

Player	G	IP	W	L	ERA	SO
Dick Barrett	36	190.2	8	20	5.38	72
Dick Mauney	20	122.2	6	10	3.08	35
Jack Kraus	19	81.2	4	9	5.40	28
Bill Lee	13	77.1	3	6	4.66	13
Whit Wyatt	10	51.1	0	7	5.26	10
Hugh Mulcahy	5	28.1	1	3	3.81	2
Ken Raffensberger	5	24.1	0	3	4.44	6

==== Other pitchers ====
Note: G = Games pitched; IP = Innings pitched; W = Wins; L = Losses; ERA = Earned run average; SO = Strikeouts

Player	G	IP	W	L	ERA	SO
Charley Schanz	35	144.2	4	15	4.35	56
Charlie Sproull	34	130.1	4	10	5.94	47
Oscar Judd	23	82.2	5	4	3.81	36
Izzy León	14	38.2	0	4	5.35	11
Vern Kennedy	12	36.0	0	3	5.50	13
Jimmie Foxx	9	22.2	1	0	1.59	10
Lefty Scott	8	22.1	0	2	4.43	5
Don Grate	4	8.1	0	1	17.28	6

==== Relief pitchers ====
Note: G = Games pitched; W = Wins; L = Losses; SV = Saves; ERA = Earned run average; SO = Strikeouts

Player	G	W	L	SV	ERA	SO
Andy Karl	67	8	8	15	2.99	51
René Monteagudo	14	0	0	0	7.49	16
Dick Coffman	14	2	1	0	5.13	2
Lou Lucier	13	0	1	1	2.21	5
Charlie Ripple	4	0	1	0	7.04	5
Mitch Chetkovich	4	0	0	0	0.00	0
Ben Chapman	3	0	0	0	7.71	4

== Farm system ==
Level	Team	League	Manager
A	Utica Blue Sox	Eastern League	Eddie Sawyer
B	Wilmington Blue Rocks	Interstate League	Ray Brubaker and Cy Morgan
C	Greensboro Patriots	Carolina League	Wes Ferrell, Charles Burgess, Charles Eatman and Johnny Allen
D	Concord Weavers	North Carolina State League	John Lehman
D	Bradford Blue Wings	PONY League	Leon Riley
