= 1945 New York Giants (MLB) season =

1945 New York Giants
- League: National League
- Ballpark: Polo Grounds
- City: New York City
- Record: 78–74 (.513)
- League place: 5th
- Owners: Horace Stoneham
- Managers: Mel Ott
- Radio: WINS (Al Helfer, Bill Slater)

The 1945 New York Giants season was the franchise's 63rd season. The team finished in fifth place in the National League with a 78–74 record, 19 games behind the Chicago Cubs.

== Offseason ==
- Prior to 1945 season: Ed Albrecht was signed as an amateur free agent by the Giants.

== Regular season ==
=== Season standings ===
National League
Team	W	L	Pct.	GB	Home	Road
Chicago Cubs	98	56	.636	—	49‍–‍26	49‍–‍30
St. Louis Cardinals	95	59	.617	3	48‍–‍29	47‍–‍30
Brooklyn Dodgers	87	67	.565	11	48‍–‍30	39‍–‍37
Pittsburgh Pirates	82	72	.532	16	45‍–‍34	37‍–‍38
New York Giants	78	74	.513	19	47‍–‍30	31‍–‍44
Boston Braves	67	85	.441	30	36‍–‍38	31‍–‍47
Cincinnati Reds	61	93	.396	37	36‍–‍41	25‍–‍52
Philadelphia Phillies	46	108	.299	52	22‍–‍55	24‍–‍53

=== Record vs. opponents ===
1945 National League record Sources:
Team	BSN	BRO	CHC	CIN	NYG	PHI	PIT	STL
Boston	—	9–13–1	7–15	10–12	10–10–2	14–8	7–15	10–12
Brooklyn	13–9–1	—	8–14–1	11–11	15–7	19–3	12–10	9–13
Chicago	15–7	14–8–1	—	21–1	11–11	17–5	14–8	6–16
Cincinnati	12–10	11–11	1–21	—	6–16	12–10	10–12	9–13
New York	10–10–2	7–15	11–11	16–6	—	17–5	11–11	6–16
Philadelphia	8–14	3–19	5–17	10–12	5–17	—	6–16	9–13
Pittsburgh	15–7	10–12	8–14	12–10	11–11	16–6	—	10–12–1
St. Louis	12–10	13–9	16–6	13–9	16–6	13–9	12–10–1	—

=== Roster ===
1945 New York Giants
Roster
Pitchers: 27 Ace Adams; 19 Loren Bain; 21 Jack Brewer; 24 Slim Emmerich; 14 Harry Feldman; 15 Rube Fischer; 15 Don Fisher; 20 Johnny Gee; 28 Andy Hansen; 18,23 Ray Harrell; 22 Roy Lee; 19 Sal Maglie; 16 Van Mungo; 37 Jack Phillips; 18 Ewald Pyle; 17 Bill Voiselle; 28 Adrián Zabala	Catchers: 9 Ray Berres; 37 Bill DeKoning; 23 Clyde Kluttz; 8 Ernie Lombardi; Infielders: 29 Al Gardella; 12 George Hausmann; 7 Johnny Hudson; 26 Billy Jurges; 10 Buddy Kerr; 6 Nap Reyes; 35 Mike Schemer; 5 Phil Weintraub; 5 Roy Zimmerman	Outfielders: 34 Steve Filipowicz; 33 Danny Gardella; 22 Whitey Lockman; 3 Jim Mallory; 3 Charlie Mead; 3 Joe Medwick; 4 Mel Ott; 1 Johnny Rucker; 2 Red Treadway	Manager: 4 Mel Ott; Coaches: 30 Bubber Jonnard; 31 Adolfo Luque

== Player stats ==
=== Batting ===
==== Starters by position ====
Note: Pos = Position; G = Games played; AB = At bats; H = Hits; Avg. = Batting average; HR = Home runs; RBI = Runs batted in

Pos	Player	G	AB	H	Avg.	HR	RBI
C	Ernie Lombardi	115	368	113	.307	19	70
1B	Phil Weintraub	82	283	77	.272	10	42
2B	George Hausmann	154	623	174	.279	2	45
SS	Buddy Kerr	149	546	136	.249	4	40
3B	Nap Reyes	122	431	124	.288	5	44
OF	Mel Ott	135	451	139	.308	21	79
OF	Danny Gardella	121	430	117	.272	18	71
OF	Johnny Rucker	105	429	117	.273	7	51

==== Other batters ====
Note: G = Games played; AB = At bats; H = Hits; Avg. = Batting average; HR = Home runs; RBI = Runs batted in

Player	G	AB	H	Avg.	HR	RBI
Red Treadway	88	224	54	.241	4	23
Clyde Kluttz	73	222	62	.279	4	21
Billy Jurges	61	176	57	.324	3	24
Whitey Lockman	32	129	44	.341	3	18
Steve Filipowicz	35	112	23	.205	2	16
Mike Schemer	31	108	36	.333	1	10
Roy Zimmerman	27	98	27	.276	5	15
Jim Mallory	37	94	28	.298	0	9
Joe Medwick	26	92	28	.304	3	11
Charlie Mead	11	37	10	.270	1	6
Ray Berres	20	30	5	.167	0	2
Al Gardella	16	26	2	.077	0	1
Johnny Hudson	28	11	0	.000	0	0
Bill DeKoning	3	1	0	.000	0	0

=== Pitching ===
==== Starting pitchers ====
Note: G = Games pitched; IP = Innings pitched; W = Wins; L = Losses; ERA = Earned run average; SO = Strikeouts

Player	G	IP	W	L	ERA	SO
Bill Voiselle	41	232.1	14	14	4.49	115
Harry Feldman	35	217.2	12	13	3.27	74
Van Mungo	26	183.0	14	7	3.20	101
Jack Brewer	28	159.2	8	6	3.83	49
Sal Maglie	13	84.1	5	4	2.35	32

==== Other pitchers ====
Note: G = Games pitched; IP = Innings pitched; W = Wins; L = Losses; ERA = Earned run average; SO = Strikeouts

Player	G	IP	W	L	ERA	SO
Slim Emmerich	31	100.0	4	4	4.86	27
Andy Hansen	23	92.2	4	3	4.66	37
Adrian Zabala	11	43.1	2	4	4.78	14
Don Fisher	2	18.0	1	0	2.00	4
Roy Lee	3	7.0	0	2	11.57	0
Ewald Pyle	6	6.1	0	0	17.05	2

==== Relief pitchers ====
Note: G = Games pitched; W = Wins; L = Losses; SV = Saves; ERA = Earned run average; SO = Strikeouts

Player	G	W	L	SV	ERA	SO
Ace Adams	65	11	9	15	3.42	39
Rube Fischer	31	3	8	1	5.63	27
Ray Harrell	12	0	0	0	4.97	7
Loren Bain	3	0	0	0	7.88	1
Johnny Gee	2	0	0	1	9.00	1
Jack Phillips	1	0	0	0	10.38	0

== Farm system ==
Level	Team	League	Manager
AA	Jersey City Giants	International League	Gabby Hartnett
AA	San Francisco Seals	Pacific Coast League	Lefty O'Doul
B	Richmond Colts	Piedmont League	Frank Rodgers
C	Danville-Scholfield Leafs	Carolina League	Herb Brett
D	Bristol Twins	Appalachian League	Hal Gruber
D	Hickory Rebels	North Carolina State League	Herschel Bobo
D	Springfield Giants	Ohio State League	Earl Wolgamot
D	Erie Sailors	PONY League	Bill Harris

LEAGUE CHAMPIONS: San Francisco, Danville-Scholfield
