= 1945 Boston Braves season =

1945 Boston Braves
- League: National League
- Ballpark: Braves Field
- City: Boston, Massachusetts
- Record: 67–85 (.441)
- League place: 6th
- Owners: Louis R. Perini
- Managers: Bob Coleman, Del Bissonette
- Radio: WNAC (George Hatrick, Tom Hussey)

The 1945 Boston Braves season was the 75th season of the franchise.

Tommy Holmes had a career year, with 28 home runs, 117 RBI, and a .352 batting average. He led his team in every offensive category except walks. Holmes led the National League in hits (224), doubles (47), home runs (28), total bases (367), slugging percentage (.577) and on-base plus slugging (.997). He finished second in the NL in RBI and batting average. Holmes also put up a 37-game hitting streak this season, lasting from June 6 to July 8, recording a .423 batting average (66-for-156) with 9 home runs and 41 RBI. His hitting-streak record held for 33 years until 1978, when Pete Rose put together a 44-game hitting streak.

== Regular season ==
=== Season standings ===
National League
Team	W	L	Pct.	GB	Home	Road
Chicago Cubs	98	56	.636	—	49‍–‍26	49‍–‍30
St. Louis Cardinals	95	59	.617	3	48‍–‍29	47‍–‍30
Brooklyn Dodgers	87	67	.565	11	48‍–‍30	39‍–‍37
Pittsburgh Pirates	82	72	.532	16	45‍–‍34	37‍–‍38
New York Giants	78	74	.513	19	47‍–‍30	31‍–‍44
Boston Braves	67	85	.441	30	36‍–‍38	31‍–‍47
Cincinnati Reds	61	93	.396	37	36‍–‍41	25‍–‍52
Philadelphia Phillies	46	108	.299	52	22‍–‍55	24‍–‍53

=== Record vs. opponents ===
1945 National League record Sources:
Team	BSN	BRO	CHC	CIN	NYG	PHI	PIT	STL
Boston	—	9–13–1	7–15	10–12	10–10–2	14–8	7–15	10–12
Brooklyn	13–9–1	—	8–14–1	11–11	15–7	19–3	12–10	9–13
Chicago	15–7	14–8–1	—	21–1	11–11	17–5	14–8	6–16
Cincinnati	12–10	11–11	1–21	—	6–16	12–10	10–12	9–13
New York	10–10–2	7–15	11–11	16–6	—	17–5	11–11	6–16
Philadelphia	8–14	3–19	5–17	10–12	5–17	—	6–16	9–13
Pittsburgh	15–7	10–12	8–14	12–10	11–11	16–6	—	10–12–1
St. Louis	12–10	13–9	16–6	13–9	16–6	13–9	12–10–1	—

=== Roster ===
1945 Boston Braves
Roster
Pitchers: 25 Nate Andrews; 19 Red Barrett; 20,25 Ben Cardoni; 13 Mort Cooper; 21 Charlie Cozart; 24 Tom Earley; 23 Lou Fette; 24 Don Hendrickson; 12 Joe Heving; 17 Johnny Hutchings; 11,19 Ira Hutchinson; 18 Al Javery; 26 Bill Lee; 20 Bob Logan; 15 Ewald Pyle; 26 Hal Schacker; -- Elmer Singleton; 22 Jim Tobin; 9,15 Lefty Wallace; 15 Bob Whitcher; 14 Ed Wright	Catchers: 9,21 Stew Hofferth; 11 Clyde Kluttz; 10 Phil Masi; 29 Mike Ulicny; Infielders: 6 Dick Culler; 2 Frank Drews; 9,27 Eddie Joost; 3 Joe Mack; 5,11 Tommy Nelson; 28 Steve Shemo; 5 Vince Shupe; 12 Norm Wallen; 7 Whitey Wietelmann; 6 Chuck Workman	Outfielders: 28 Morrie Aderholt; 4 Carden Gillenwater; 1 Tommy Holmes; 3,5 Joe Medwick; 16 Butch Nieman; 14,29 Bill Ramsey; 4 Stan Wentzel	Manager: 33 Del Bissonette; 31 Bob Coleman; Coaches: 32 Benny Bengough; 33 Del Bissonette

== Player stats ==
=== Batting ===
==== Starters by position ====
Note: Pos = Position; G = Games played; AB = At bats; H = Hits; Avg. = Batting average; HR = Home runs; RBI = Runs batted in

Pos	Player	G	AB	H	Avg.	HR	RBI
C	Phil Masi	114	371	101	.272	7	46
1B	Vince Shupe	78	283	76	.269	0	15
2B	Whitey Wietelmann	123	428	116	.271	4	33
SS	Dick Culler	136	527	138	.262	2	30
3B	Chuck Workman	139	514	141	.274	25	87
OF	Carden Gillenwater	144	517	149	.288	7	72
OF	Tommy Holmes	154	636	224	.352	28	117
OF	Butch Nieman	97	247	61	.247	14	56

==== Other batters ====
Note: G = Games played; AB = At bats; H = Hits; Avg. = Batting average; HR = Home runs; RBI = Runs batted in

Player	G	AB	H	Avg.	HR	RBI
Joe Mack	66	260	60	.231	3	44
Joe Medwick	66	218	62	.284	0	26
Stew Hofferth	50	170	40	.235	3	15
Frank Drews	49	147	30	.204	0	19
Eddie Joost	35	141	35	.248	0	9
Bill Ramsey	78	137	40	.292	1	12
Tommy Nelson	40	121	20	.165	0	6
Morrie Aderholt	31	102	34	.333	2	11
Clyde Kluttz	25	81	24	.296	0	10
Steve Shemo	17	46	11	.239	0	7
Stan Wentzel	4	19	4	.211	0	6
Mike Ulicny	11	18	7	.389	1	4
Norm Wallen	4	15	2	.133	0	1

=== Pitching ===
==== Starting pitchers ====
Note: G = Games pitched; IP = Innings pitched; W = Wins; L = Losses; ERA = Earned run average; SO = Strikeouts

Player	G	IP	W	L	ERA	SO
Jim Tobin	27	196.2	9	14	3.84	38
Bob Logan	34	187.0	7	11	3.18	53
Nate Andrews	21	137.2	7	12	4.58	26
Ed Wright	15	111.1	8	3	2.51	24
Bill Lee	16	106.1	6	3	2.79	12
Al Javery	17	77.1	2	7	6.28	18
Elmer Singleton	7	37.1	1	4	4.82	14

==== Other pitchers ====
Note: G = Games pitched; IP = Innings pitched; W = Wins; L = Losses; ERA = Earned run average; SO = Strikeouts

Player	G	IP	W	L	ERA	SO
Johnny Hutchings	57	185.0	7	6	3.75	99
Mort Cooper	20	78.0	7	4	3.35	45
Tom Earley	11	41.0	2	1	4.61	4
Red Barrett	9	38.0	2	3	4.74	13
Lefty Wallace	5	20.0	1	0	4.50	4
Bob Whitcher	6	15.2	0	2	2.87	6
Ewald Pyle	4	13.2	0	1	7.24	10
Lou Fette	5	11.0	0	2	5.73	4

==== Relief pitchers ====
Note: G = Games pitched; W = Wins; L = Losses; SV = Saves; ERA = Earned run average; SO = Strikeouts

Player	G	W	L	SV	ERA	SO
Don Hendrickson	37	4	8	5	4.91	14
Ira Hutchinson	11	2	3	1	5.02	4
Hal Schacker	6	0	1	0	5.28	6
Charlie Cozart	5	1	0	0	10.13	4
Joe Heving	3	1	0	0	3.38	1
Ben Cardoni	3	0	0	0	9.00	5
Whitey Wietelmann	1	0	0	0	54.00	0

== Farm system ==
Level	Team	League	Manager
A	Hartford Bees	Eastern League	Merle Settlemire
D	Mooresville Braves	North Carolina State League	Jack Quinlan
