= 1945 St. Louis Cardinals season =

Major League Baseball season

1945 St. Louis Cardinals
- League: National League
- Ballpark: Sportsman's Park
- City: St. Louis, Missouri
- Record: 95–59 (.617)
- League place: 2nd
- Owners: Sam Breadon
- Managers: Billy Southworth
- Radio: WIL (Harry Caray, Gabby Street); WEW/WTMV (France Laux, Johnny O'Hara)
- Stats: ESPN.com; Baseball Reference

The 1945 St. Louis Cardinals season was the team's 64th season in St. Louis, Missouri and the 54th season in the National League. The Cardinals went 95–59 during the season and finished second in the National League. The Cardinals set a Major League record which still stands, for the fewest double plays grounded into during a season, with only 75.

== Offseason ==
- Prior to 1945 season: Steve Bilko was signed by the Cardinals as an amateur free agent.

== Regular season ==
Stan Musial, Walker Cooper, Max Lanier and pitcher Mort Cooper, who experienced elbow problems later in the season, got into a contract squabble with Harry Breadon during the spring. They signed contracts for $12,000 apiece, then balked at reporting for opening day after learning Marion had been upped to $15,000.

On May 23, the Cards sent Mort Cooper to the Boston Braves for pitcher Red Barrett, who compiled a league-high total of 23 wins, and $60,000. However, the Redbirds did not have enough pitching depth to keep up with the faster pace of a Chicago Cubs team filled with veteran pitchers such as Paul Derringer.

The Cardinals actually won 16 of their 22 meetings with The Cubs.

Only Whitey Kurowski batted over .300 among the regulars. He was one of the few Cardinals were able to keep their jobs once the boys marched home from Europe and the Pacific.

Red Schoendienst stole 26 bases but batted just .278 and drove in only 47 runs.

=== Season standings ===
National League
Team	W	L	Pct.	GB	Home	Road
Chicago Cubs	98	56	.636	—	49‍–‍26	49‍–‍30
St. Louis Cardinals	95	59	.617	3	48‍–‍29	47‍–‍30
Brooklyn Dodgers	87	67	.565	11	48‍–‍30	39‍–‍37
Pittsburgh Pirates	82	72	.532	16	45‍–‍34	37‍–‍38
New York Giants	78	74	.513	19	47‍–‍30	31‍–‍44
Boston Braves	67	85	.441	30	36‍–‍38	31‍–‍47
Cincinnati Reds	61	93	.396	37	36‍–‍41	25‍–‍52
Philadelphia Phillies	46	108	.299	52	22‍–‍55	24‍–‍53

=== Record vs. opponents ===
1945 National League record Sources:
Team	BSN	BRO	CHC	CIN	NYG	PHI	PIT	STL
Boston	—	9–13–1	7–15	10–12	10–10–2	14–8	7–15	10–12
Brooklyn	13–9–1	—	8–14–1	11–11	15–7	19–3	12–10	9–13
Chicago	15–7	14–8–1	—	21–1	11–11	17–5	14–8	6–16
Cincinnati	12–10	11–11	1–21	—	6–16	12–10	10–12	9–13
New York	10–10–2	7–15	11–11	16–6	—	17–5	11–11	6–16
Philadelphia	8–14	3–19	5–17	10–12	5–17	—	6–16	9–13
Pittsburgh	15–7	10–12	8–14	12–10	11–11	16–6	—	10–12–1
St. Louis	12–10	13–9	16–6	13–9	16–6	13–9	12–10–1	—

=== Notable transactions ===
- May 8, 1945: Glenn Crawford and John Antonelli were traded by the Cardinals to the Philadelphia Phillies for Buster Adams.

=== Roster ===
1945 St. Louis Cardinals
Roster
Pitchers: 13 Red Barrett; 31 Harry Brecheen; 10 Ken Burkhart; 27 Bud Byerly; 13 Mort Cooper; 19 Jack Creel; 27 Bill Crouch; 23 George Dockins; 20 Blix Donnelly; 15 Glenn Gardner; 29 Al Jurisich; 21 Max Lanier; 24 Art Lopatka; 32 Stan Partenheimer; 28 Ted Wilks	Catchers: 15 Walker Cooper; 35 Gene Crumling; 2,18 Bob Keely; 16 Ken O'Dea; 11 Del Rice; Infielders: 18 John Antonelli; 7 George Fallon; 9 Debs Garms; 2 Lou Klein; 1 Whitey Kurowski; 4 Marty Marion; 5 Ray Sanders; 3 Emil Verban; 7 Pep Young	Outfielders: 14 Buster Adams; 8 Dave Bartosch; 17 Augie Bergamo; 35 Glenn Crawford; 12 Johnny Hopp; 18 Jim Mallory; 8 Art Rebel; 6 Red Schoendienst	Manager: 30 Billy Southworth; Coaches: 25 Mike González; 26 Buzzy Wares

== Player stats ==
=== Batting ===
==== Starters by position ====
Note: Pos = Position; G = Games played; AB = At bats; H = Hits; Avg. = Batting average; HR = Home runs; RBI = Runs batted in

Pos	Player	G	AB	H	Avg.	HR	RBI
C	Ken O'Dea	100	307	78	.254	4	43
1B	Ray Sanders	143	537	148	.276	8	78
2B	Emil Verban	155	597	166	.278	0	72
SS	Marty Marion	123	430	119	.277	1	59
3B	Whitey Kurowski	133	511	165	.323	21	102
OF	Buster Adams	140	578	169	.292	20	101
OF	Johnny Hopp	124	446	129	.289	3	44
OF	Red Schoendienst	137	565	157	.278	1	47

==== Other batters ====
Note: G = Games played; AB = At bats; H = Hits; Avg. = Batting average; HR = Home runs; RBI = Runs batted in

Player	G	AB	H	Avg.	HR	RBI
Augie Bergamo	94	304	96	.316	3	44
Del Rice	83	253	66	.261	1	28
Debs Garms	74	146	49	.336	0	18
Art Rebel	26	72	25	.347	0	5
Lou Klein	19	57	13	.228	1	6
George Fallon	24	55	13	.236	0	7
Dave Bartosch	24	47	12	.255	0	1
Pep Young	27	47	7	.149	1	4
Jim Mallory	13	43	10	.233	0	5
Walker Cooper	4	18	7	.389	0	1
Gene Crumling	6	12	1	.083	0	1
Glenn Crawford	4	3	0	.000	0	0
John Antonelli	2	3	0	.000	0	0
Bob Keely	1	1	0	.000	0	0

=== Pitching ===
==== Starting pitchers ====
Note: G = Games pitched; IP = Innings pitched; W = Wins; L = Losses; ERA = Earned run average; SO = Strikeouts

Player	G	IP	W	L	ERA	SO
Red Barrett	36	246.2	21	9	2.74	63
Blix Donnelly	31	166.1	8	10	3.52	76
Harry Brecheen	24	157.1	15	4	2.52	63
Ted Wilks	18	98.1	4	7	2.93	28
Max Lanier	4	26.0	2	2	1.73	16
Mort Cooper	4	23.2	2	0	1.52	14

==== Other pitchers ====
Note: G = Games pitched; IP = Innings pitched; W = Wins; L = Losses; ERA = Earned run average; SO = Strikeouts

Player	G	IP	W	L	ERA	SO
Ken Burkhart	42	217.1	18	8	2.90	67
George Dockins	31	126.1	8	6	3.21	33
Bud Byerly	33	95.0	4	5	4.74	39
Jack Creel	26	87.0	5	4	4.14	34
Al Jurisich	27	71.2	3	3	5.15	42
Glenn Gardner	17	54.2	3	1	3.29	20
Stan Partenheimer	8	13.1	0	0	6.08	6
Art Lopatka	4	11.2	1	0	1.54	5

==== Relief pitchers ====
Note: G = Games pitched; W = Wins; L = Losses; SV = Saves; ERA = Earned run average; SO = Strikeouts

Player	G	W	L	SV	ERA	SO
Bill Crouch	6	1	0	0	3.38	4

== Farm system ==
Level	Team	League	Manager
AA	Columbus Red Birds	American Association	Charlie Root
AA	Rochester Red Wings	International League	Burleigh Grimes
B	Allentown Cardinals	Interstate League	Ollie Vanek
B	Lynchburg Cardinals	Piedmont League	George Ferrell and Zip Payne
C	Winston-Salem Cardinals	Carolina League	George Smith and George Ferrell
D	Johnson City Cardinals	Appalachian League	Fred Hawn and Runt Marr
D	Marion Cardinals	Ohio State League	Grover Hartley and Wally Schang
