= Shupe =

Shupe may refer to:

== Place names ==
- Shupe, Virginia, U.S.
- Shupe Peak, Victoria Land, Antarctica

== People with the surname ==
- Anson Shupe (1948–2015), American sociologist
- Bryan Shupe, American politician
- Elisa Rae Shupe (1963-2025), American soldier
- Ryan Shupe, American musician
- Vince Shupe (1921–1962), Major League Baseball first baseman

=== Fictional characters ===
- Glen Shupe, an Irish drug addict featuring in the HBO television series Oz
