= John Antonelli =

John Antonelli may refer to:

- Johnny Antonelli (1930–2020), American baseball pitcher
- John Antonelli (infielder) (1915–1990), American baseball infielder
