= Scott Marshall =

Scott Marshall may refer to:

- Scott Marshall (director) (born 1969), American film director
- Scott Marshall (footballer) (born 1973), Scottish former professional footballer and coach
- Scott Marshall, character in Up, Up and Away

== See also ==
- Marshall Scott, baseball pitcher
