= 1961 NAIA World Series =

1961 NAIA baseball tournament
- 1961 NAIA World Series
- Teams: 8
- Format: Double elimination
- Finals site: Soos Park; Sioux City, Iowa
- Champions: East Carolina (1st title)
- Winning coach: James Mallory
- MVP: Larry Crayton (P) (East Carolina)

The 1961 NAIA World Series was the fifth annual tournament hosted by the National Association of Intercollegiate Athletics to determine the national champion of baseball among its member colleges and universities in the United States and Canada.

The tournament was played at Soos Park in Sioux City, Iowa.

East Carolina (22-4) defeated Sacramento State (22-14) in the championship series, 13–7, to win the Pirates' first NAIA World Series.

East Carolina pitcher Larry Crayton was named tournament MVP.

== Bracket ==
Upper round 1
East Carolina	8
Winona State	4
Defiance	0
Sam Houston State	10
Omaha	2
Sacramento State	1
Grambling	8
Slippery Rock State	2

Upper round 2
East Carolina	7
Sam Houston State	4
Omaha	1
Grambling	4
Lower round 1
Winona State	9
Defiance	10
Sacramento State	5
Slippery Rock State	3

Upper final
East Carolina	9
Grambling	4
Lower round 2
Omaha	9
Defiance	1
Sam Houston State	1
Sacramento State	13

Semifinals
East Carolina	11
Omaha	4
Grambling	2
Sacramento State	4

Final
East Carolina	5	13
Sacramento State	14	7

== See also ==
- 1961 NCAA University Division baseball tournament
