= Vince Shupe =

American baseball player

- Shupe with the Boston Braves, c. 1945
- First baseman
- Born: September 5, 1921; East Canton, Ohio, U.S.
- Died: April 5, 1962 (aged 40); Canton, Ohio, U.S.
- Batted: Left Threw: Left

MLB debut
- July 7, 1945, for the Boston Braves

Last MLB appearance
- September 30, 1945, for the Boston Braves

MLB statistics
- Batting average: .269
- Home runs: 0
- Runs batted in: 15
- Stats at Baseball Reference

Teams
- Boston Braves (1945)

Vincent William Shupe (September 5, 1921 – April 5, 1962) was an American professional baseball first baseman who played for the 1945 Boston Braves of Major League Baseball (MLB). Listed at 5 feet 11 inches (1.80 m) and 180 pounds (82 kg), he batted and threw left-handed.

== Biography ==
Shupe's minor league career spanned 1939 to 1950; he did not play professionally for two seasons (1942–1943) during World War II. He appeared in 1153 minor league games, playing for seven different teams, including four seasons in the Pacific Coast League. Primarily a first baseman, he also made nine appearances as a pitcher early in his career, and five appearances in the outfield late in his career.

Shupe is one of many ballplayers who only appeared in the major leagues during World War II. His first major league experience was on July 7, 1945, for the Boston Braves against the Pittsburgh Pirates. He played first base regularly for the Braves through the end of the season, taking over from Joe Mack, whose last game had been on July 4. Baseball records list Shupe as appearing in a game earlier in the season, against the Brooklyn Dodgers on June 17; however, that was a suspended game, and he only played in the completion of the game, when it was resumed on August 4. Shupe played in 78 major league games, registering a .269 batting average (76-for-283), 15 RBIs, and no home runs. Defensively, he made eight errors in 703 total chances for a .989 fielding percentage.

Shupe was a native of East Canton, Ohio. At one time, he dated actress Jean Peters. After his professional baseball career, he worked as a petroleum salesman. Shupe died at the age of 40 in Canton, Ohio.
