= Bitsy Mott =

American baseball player (1918–2001)

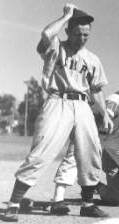
- Mott in 1948
- Shortstop
- Born: June 12, 1918; Arcadia, Florida, U.S.
- Died: February 25, 2001 (aged 82); Brandon, Florida, U.S.
- Batted: Right Threw: Right

MLB debut
- April 17, 1945, for the Brooklyn Dodgers

Last MLB appearance
- September 30, 1945, for the Brooklyn Dodgers

MLB statistics
- Batting average: .221
- Home runs: 0
- Runs batted in: 22
- Stats at Baseball Reference

Teams
- Brooklyn Dodgers (1945)

Elisha Matthew Mott (June 12, 1918 – February 25, 2001), known as Bitsy Mott, was an American backup infielder in Major League Baseball who played for the Philadelphia Phillies. Listed at 5 feet 8 inches (1.73 m), 155 pounds (70 kg), he batted and threw right-handed.

== Career ==
Born in Arcadia, Florida, Mott played mostly shortstop, with stints at second base and third base. He made his professional debut in 1939 with the Americus Pioneers, a Brooklyn Dodgers minor league affiliate team.

After playing for several minors teams, he joined the 1945 Phillies at the age of 27.

Mott batted .221 in 90 games for the Phillies, including eight doubles and two stolen bases, scoring 21 runs while driving in 22 more. He then returned to the minors for the remainder of his active career, retiring in 1957.

== Later life ==
He later became personal security manager to Elvis Presley from 1955 to 1973, spending about 11 months of each year on the road with Presley and his manager Colonel Parker, who also was his brother-in-law. His duties included arranging travel between cities, screening Presley's phone calls and handling other personal problems that might arise on the road. He also appeared in four of Presley's films, and was one of the select few who actually attended Presley's funeral in 1977.

Mott died in 2001 in Brandon, Florida, at the age of 82.
