= Buster Adams =

American baseball player (1915–1990)

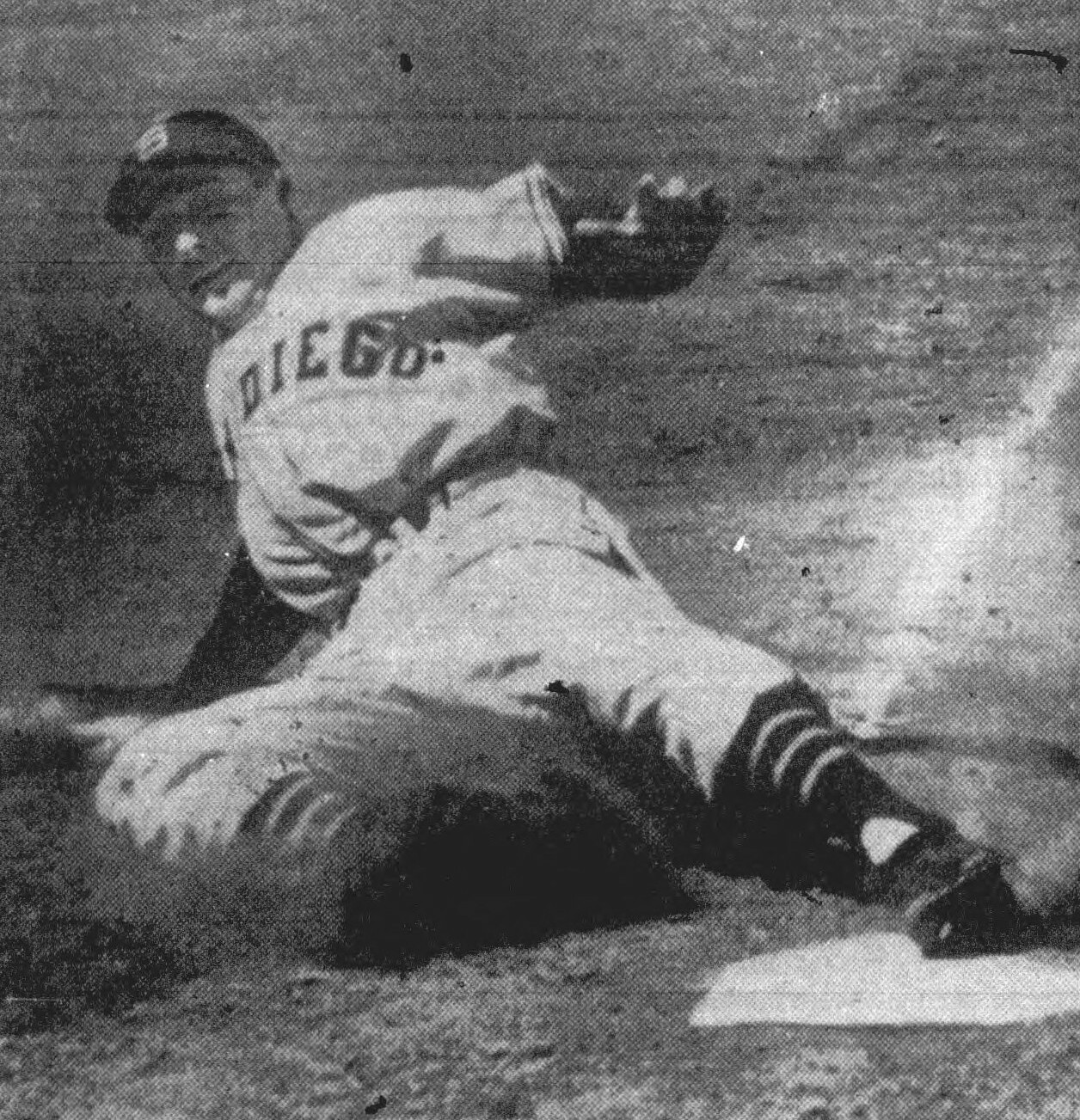
- Adams sliding into home plate during a game on April 9, 1950.
- Outfielder
- Born: June 24, 1915; Trinidad, Colorado, U.S.
- Died: September 1, 1990 (aged 75); Rancho Mirage, California, U.S.
- Batted: Right Threw: Right

MLB debut
- April 27, 1939, for the St. Louis Cardinals

Last MLB appearance
- September 21, 1947, for the Philadelphia Phillies

MLB statistics
- Batting average: .266
- Home runs: 50
- Runs batted in: 249
- Stats at Baseball Reference

Teams
- St. Louis Cardinals (1939, 1943, 1945–1946); Philadelphia Phillies (1943–1945, 1947)

Elvin Clark "Buster" Adams (June 24, 1915 – September 1, 1990) was an American Major League Baseball (MLB) outfielder for the St. Louis Cardinals and Philadelphia Phillies in 1939 and between 1943 and 1947.

== Early life ==
Adams was born in 1915 in Trinidad, Colorado. He graduated from Bisbee High School in Bisbee, Arizona, in 1935. He spent a year playing in the Western Association before moving to the Pacific Coast League (PCL) for the 1936 season.

== Early professional career ==
In 1936, Adams began playing for the Sacramento Solons of the PCL; he played in the PCL off-and-on for the next 16 seasons. When Adams broke his leg during the 1936 season, he had been leading the PCL in stolen bases, but he missed much of the season with that injury. Adams was in spring training with the St. Louis Cardinals in March 1939 when his jaw was fractured after he was struck with a thrown ball. He still made his major league debut on April 27, 1939 for the Cardinals, but appeared in only two games that season. He was cut in early May.

In May 1941, Alan Ward of the Oakland Tribune wrote that Adams had been playing with a stomach illness for a couple of seasons. He was hitting .423 for the Sacramento Solons at the time. Adams finished the season with a .285 batting average in 1941 and then hit .309 the next season.

== Later career ==
Adams returned to the majors with the Cardinals in 1943, playing in eight games before being traded to the Phillies. He played the rest of that season, all of 1944, and the first 14 games of 1945 with the Phillies. Though Adams had been able to play through his stomach ailment, the illness rendered him ineligible to serve in the military in 1944.

In May 1945, Adams was traded back to the Cardinals for John Antonelli and Glenn Crawford. Adams played mostly in center field; a slot had opened up in the outfield because Stan Musial was serving in the military. Adams put together his best season with the Cardinals in 1945 and finished 18th in voting for the MVP Award. He finished the season with 109 runs batted in; his 101 RBI with the Cardinals was a record for a Cardinals center fielder until 1987.

Adams also played in 1946 with the Cardinals and 1947 with the Phillies. He returned to the PCL after that and played until 1951.

In 576 major league games over six seasons, Adams posted a .266 batting average (532-for-2003) with 282 runs, 96 doubles, 12 triples, 50 home runs, 249 RBI and 234 bases on balls. He recorded a .979 fielding percentage playing at all three outfield positions.

== Later life ==
Adams died of congestive heart failure in Rancho Mirage, California, in 1990.
