= Lexington Bees =

- 1935–1938; Lexington, Tennessee

Minor league affiliations
- Class: Class D (1935–1938)
- League: Kentucky–Illinois–Tennessee League (1935–1938)

Major league affiliations
- Team: Boston Bees (1938); Unaffiliated (1935–1937)

Minor league titles
- League titles (0): None
- First-half titles (1): 1935

Team data
- Name: Lexington Bees (1938); Lexington Giants (1935–1937)
- Ballpark: Lexington Park (1935–1938)

The Lexington Bees, previously known as the Lexington Giants, were a Minor League Baseball team that played in the Class D Kentucky–Illinois–Tennessee League (KITTY League) from 1935 to 1938. They were located in Lexington, Tennessee, and played their home games at Lexington Park. The team was known as the Giants from 1935 to 1937. They were renamed the Bees when they became an affiliate of the Boston Bees in 1938.

== History ==
The team began competition in 1935 as the Lexington Giants playing at Lexington Park. They were managed by player-manager John Antonelli. The Giants won their inaugural season opener on May 22 by defeating the Jackson Generals, 10–7. On June 30, Lester Gray pitched a no-hitter against the Portageville Pirates in a 7–0 road win. The Giants won the first half of the KITTY League's split season, which qualified them for the postseason championship playoffs.

Though Jackson and the Union City Greyhounds ended the second half in first and second place, respectively, the league refused to award either team the second half title because they exceeded the limit of veteran players on their rosters. The second half title was then awarded to third-place Portageville. Lexington refused to play Portageville for the KITTY League championship, believing they were not entitled to the second half title. As a result, no playoff games were held, and the league declared no champion. The Giants' season record was 43–46 (.483).

The 1936 Giants, managed by Antonelli and Rip Fanning, compiled a 68–52 (.567) record, but did not win either half of the season. Fanning led the 1937 team to a record of 60–61 (.496), again not winning either half of the season.

In 1938, the team changed its name to the Lexington Bees when they became a farm club of the National League's Boston Bees. Fanning led the Bees to a 66–59 (.528) record and third-place finish, which qualified them for the playoffs. They were eliminated in the first round by the Jackson Generals, three games to zero. Their final game was a 9–0 road loss on September 19.

Lexington did not field another team in 1939. Over four years of competition, their composite record was 237–218 (.521).

== Season-by-season results ==
Season	Regular season				Postseason			MLB affiliate	Ref.
Season	Record	Win %	Finish	GB	Record	Win %	Result	MLB affiliate	Ref.
1935	43–46	.483	5th	5 1/2	—	—	Result	Won first half title Refused to participate in playoffs	—
1936	68–52	.567	3rd	6	—	—	—	—	
1937	60–61	.496	6th	14	—	—	—	—	
1938	66–59	.528	3rd	8	0–3	.000	Lost semifinals vs. Jackson Generals, 3–0	Boston Bees	
Totals	237–218	.521	—	—	0–3	.000	—	—	—

== Notable players ==
Four Lexington players also played in Major League Baseball during their careers. They, along with their seasons in Lexington, were:

- John Antonelli (1935–1936)
- Johnny Beazley (1937)
- Sol Carter (1937)
- Al Javery (1938)
