= Lexington, Tennessee =

- City
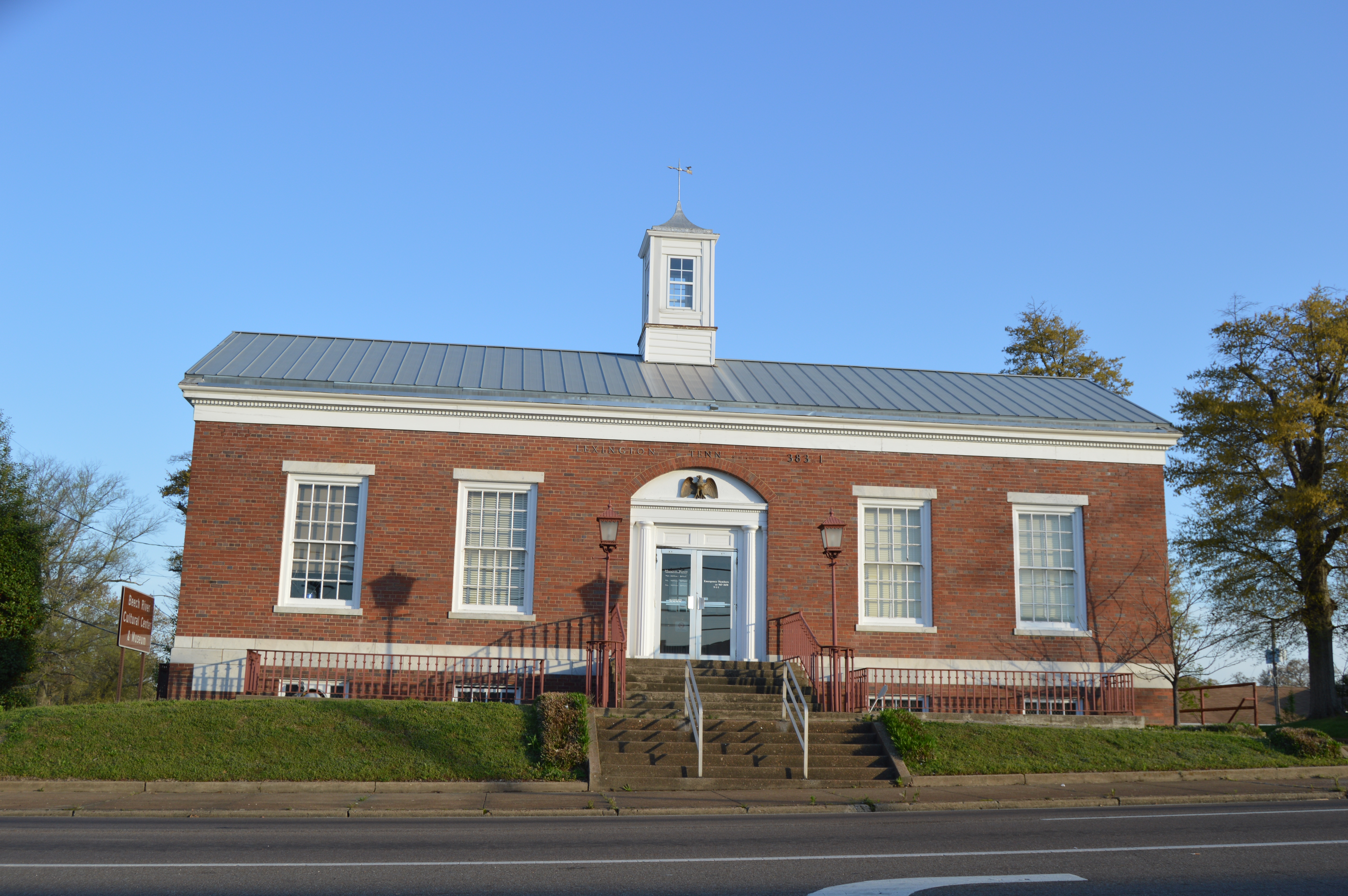
- Former post office in Lexington

- Flag

- Location in Henderson County, Tennessee
- Coordinates: 35°39′26″N 88°23′33″W
- Country: United States
- State: Tennessee
- County: Henderson

Government
  - Mayor: Gordon Wildridge

Area
  - Total: 11.88 sq mi (30.78 km^{2})
  - Land: 11.71 sq mi (30.32 km^{2})
  - Water: 0.18 sq mi (0.46 km^{2})
- Elevation: 522 ft (159.1 m)

Population (2020)
  - Total: 7,956
  - Density: 680/sq mi (262.4/km^{2})
- Time zone: UTC-6 (CST)
  - Summer (DST): UTC-5 (CDT)
- ZIP code: 38351
- Area code: 731
- FIPS code: 47-41980
- GNIS feature ID: 1291101
- Website: www.lexingtontn.gov

Lexington is a city in Henderson County, Tennessee, United States. It is midway between Memphis and Nashville, lying 10 miles (16 km) south of Interstate 40, which connects the two cities. Its population was 7,956 at the 2020 census. It is the county seat of Henderson County.

== History ==
Shortly after the 1821 creation of Henderson County, a site near its center was chosen as a county seat, and was named in honor of Lexington, Massachusetts, site of the first battle of the American Revolution. Land grant holder Samuel Wilson gave the land for the town, retaining a lot on the square where his house was already situated. The square is oriented so the corners point to the cardinal points on the compass. The first county courthouse was built in 1823; Lexington was incorporated in 1824 and by 1830 had a population of 260.

As the lead-up to the Civil War began, Henderson County voted against secession. As the war progressed, both Union and Confederate regiments were recruited in the county. The area in and around Lexington was the site of a skirmish on December 18, 1862. Union Colonel Robert Ingersoll sent his troops to destroy a bridge over Beech Creek to disallow the Confederate army moving into the area. Ingersoll's troops did not destroy the bridge, and General Nathan Bedford Forrest's troops headed into Lexington. Forrest's troops overtook the Union soldiers, taking over 140 men, including Colonel Ingersoll, and collected artillery and supplies left behind by Union soldiers who escaped.

In 1918, an African American man called Berry Noyse, who was accused of killing the sheriff, was lynched by a mob in the courthouse square and burned in the street.

== Geography ==
Lexington is in central Henderson County. U.S. Route 412 (Church Street) is the main road through the city, leading east 85 miles (137 km) to Columbia and west 27 miles (43 km) to Jackson. Tennessee State Route 22 (Broad Street) crosses US 412 in the center of Lexington, leading north 9 miles (14 km) to Interstate 40 at Parkers Crossroads and south 20 miles (32 km) to Milledgeville. State Route 459 serves as a bypass around downtown Lexington.

According to the United States Census Bureau, Lexington has a total area of 12.4 square miles (32.2 km^{2}), of which 12.2 square miles (31.7 km^{2}) are land and 0.2 sq mi (0.4 km^{2}), or 1.34%, is covered by water. The Beech River, an east-flowing tributary of the Tennessee River, runs through the southwestern part of the city.

Lexington is 7 miles (11 km) southwest of Natchez Trace State Park.

=== Climate ===
Climate data for Lexington, Tennessee, 1991–2020 normals, extremes 1962–present
Month	Jan	Feb	Mar	Apr	May	Jun	Jul	Aug	Sep	Oct	Nov	Dec	Year
Record high °F (°C)	78 (26)	83 (28)	87 (31)	91 (33)	94 (34)	104 (40)	105 (41)	106 (41)	101 (38)	97 (36)	86 (30)	78 (26)	106 (41)
Mean maximum °F (°C)	68.4 (20.2)	72.6 (22.6)	79.9 (26.6)	85.3 (29.6)	88.9 (31.6)	93.9 (34.4)	96.3 (35.7)	96.7 (35.9)	93.7 (34.3)	87.0 (30.6)	77.9 (25.5)	69.0 (20.6)	98.4 (36.9)
Mean daily maximum °F (°C)	47.9 (8.8)	52.7 (11.5)	61.7 (16.5)	71.5 (21.9)	79.1 (26.2)	86.4 (30.2)	89.4 (31.9)	89.3 (31.8)	83.8 (28.8)	73.2 (22.9)	60.8 (16.0)	51.1 (10.6)	70.6 (21.4)
Daily mean °F (°C)	37.6 (3.1)	42.0 (5.6)	49.8 (9.9)	59.0 (15.0)	67.7 (19.8)	75.5 (24.2)	78.8 (26.0)	78.1 (25.6)	71.8 (22.1)	60.2 (15.7)	48.9 (9.4)	41.0 (5.0)	59.2 (15.1)
Mean daily minimum °F (°C)	27.3 (−2.6)	31.2 (−0.4)	37.8 (3.2)	46.4 (8.0)	56.2 (13.4)	64.6 (18.1)	68.2 (20.1)	67.0 (19.4)	59.7 (15.4)	47.2 (8.4)	37.0 (2.8)	30.9 (−0.6)	47.8 (8.8)
Mean minimum °F (°C)	10.5 (−11.9)	16.7 (−8.5)	22.4 (−5.3)	31.7 (−0.2)	43.0 (6.1)	54.2 (12.3)	60.0 (15.6)	58.3 (14.6)	45.9 (7.7)	32.8 (0.4)	22.6 (−5.2)	17.2 (−8.2)	8.8 (−12.9)
Record low °F (°C)	−17 (−27)	1 (−17)	4 (−16)	22 (−6)	32 (0)	43 (6)	50 (10)	47 (8)	36 (2)	23 (−5)	9 (−13)	−8 (−22)	−17 (−27)
Average precipitation inches (mm)	4.51 (115)	4.73 (120)	4.65 (118)	5.24 (133)	6.07 (154)	4.28 (109)	4.25 (108)	3.36 (85)	3.86 (98)	4.23 (107)	4.21 (107)	5.36 (136)	54.75 (1,390)
Average snowfall inches (cm)	0.6 (1.5)	0.3 (0.76)	0.3 (0.76)	0.1 (0.25)	0.0 (0.0)	0.0 (0.0)	0.0 (0.0)	0.0 (0.0)	0.0 (0.0)	0.0 (0.0)	0.1 (0.25)	0.1 (0.25)	1.5 (3.77)
Average precipitation days (≥ 0.01 in)	10.1	10.3	10.5	9.3	9.8	8.1	8.1	6.4	5.9	7.6	8.5	10.5	105.1
Average snowy days (≥ 0.1 in)	0.3	0.5	0.1	0.0	0.0	0.0	0.0	0.0	0.0	0.0	0.1	0.0	1.0
Source 1: NOAA
Source 2: National Weather Service

== Demographics ==
Historical population
Census	Pop.	Note	%±
1880	329		—
1890	715		117.3%
1900	1,332		86.3%
1910	1,497		12.4%
1920	1,792		19.7%
1930	1,823		1.7%
1940	2,526		38.6%
1950	3,566		41.2%
1960	3,943		10.6%
1970	5,024		27.4%
1980	5,934		18.1%
1990	5,810		−2.1%
2000	7,393		27.2%
2010	7,652		3.5%
2020	7,956		4.0%

=== 2020 census ===
As of the 2020 census, Lexington had a population of 7,956. The median age was 40.7 years; 22.9% of residents were under the age of 18 and 19.7% were 65 years of age or older. For every 100 females there were 88.8 males, and for every 100 females age 18 and over there were 82.6 males age 18 and over.

76.8% of residents lived in urban areas, while 23.2% lived in rural areas.

There were 3,286 households in Lexington, of which 30.7% had children under the age of 18 living in them. Of all households, 38.0% were married-couple households, 18.3% were households with a male householder and no spouse or partner present, and 36.8% were households with a female householder and no spouse or partner present. About 32.9% of all households were made up of individuals and 15.6% had someone living alone who was 65 years of age or older; those households included 1,915 families.

There were 3,625 housing units, of which 9.4% were vacant. The homeowner vacancy rate was 1.8% and the rental vacancy rate was 8.8%.

Racial composition as of the 2020 census
Race	Number	Percent
White	6,165	77.5%
Black or African American	1,047	13.2%
American Indian and Alaska Native	21	0.3%
Asian	65	0.8%
Native Hawaiian and Other Pacific Islander	0	0.0%
Some other race	152	1.9%
Two or more races	506	6.4%
Hispanic or Latino (of any race)	308	3.9%

=== 2000 census ===
As of the census of 2000, the population density was 640.4 inhabitants per square mile (247.3/km^{2}). The 3,371 housing units had an average density of 292.0 per square mile (112.7/km^{2}). The racial makeup of the city was 84.50% White, 13.07% African American, 0.14% Native American, 0.26% Asian, 0.03% Pacific Islander, 0.42% from other races, and 1.60% from two or more races. Hispanics or Latinos of any race were 1.18% of the population.

Of the 3,039 households, 31.2% had children under 18 living with them, 48.8% were married couples living together, 14.5% had a female householder with no husband present, and 33.0% were not families. About 30.4% of all households were made up of individuals, and 12.9% had someone living alone who was 65 or older. The average household size was 2.32 and the average family size was 2.88.

In the city, the age distribution was 24.0% under 18, 8.4% from 18 to 24, 28.3% from 25 to 44, 22.3% from 45 to 64, and 17.0% who were 65 or older. The median age was 38 years. For every 100 females, there were 85.7 males. For every 100 females 18 and over, there were 80.7 males.

The median income for a household in the city was $29,725, and for a family was $41,429. Males had a median income of $31,558 versus $23,212 for females. The per capita income for the city was $18,368. About 10.2% of families and 13.2% of the population were below the poverty line, including 14.9% of those under 18 and 12.8% of those 65 or over.

== Education ==
Public schools in Lexington are operated by the Henderson County School System and the Lexington City School System. The three schools are Paul G. Caywood Elementary School, Lexington Middle School, and Lexington High School. Lexington High School is in the Henderson County School System, while Paul G. Caywood Elementary School and Lexington Middle School are both in the Lexington City School System.

Lexington is home to the Lexington-Henderson County Center of Jackson State Community College, which opened in 1999.

== Newspapers ==
- The Lexington Progress, since 1884
- Tennessee Magnet Publications

== Arts and culture ==
The Lexington-Henderson County Everett Horn Public Library serves the city.

Lexington is home to the very popular Beech Lake. Lexington's Beech River Heritage Museum holds a variety of historical artifacts of Lexington and Henderson County.

Lexington was the setting of a 1994 episode of The X-Files called "E.B.E."

Lexington claims to be the barbecue capital of the country; it supposedly has more barbecue restaurants per capita than any other city in the United States.

== Infrastructure ==
Henderson County Community Hospital is located in and serves the Lexington area.

== Sports ==
From 1935 to 1938, Lexington was home to a Minor League Baseball team that played in the Kentucky–Illinois–Tennessee League. Known as the Lexington Giants from 1935 to 1938, the team was renamed the Lexington Bees when it became a farm club of the National League's Boston Bees in 1938.

== Notable people ==
- Joe Smith Jr. (1969- ) {Magician and entertainer.Stage name JASCO The Magician
- Dick Barry (1926–2013), speaker of the Tennessee House of Representatives
- Buddy Cannon (born 1947), singer-songwriter and record producer
- Mills Darden (1799–1857), alleged largest man in history, retired, died, and was buried here
- Doug Gilbert (born 1969), professional wrestler
- Eddie Gilbert (1961–1995), professional wrestler
- Loyd Jowers (1926–2000), restaurateur and alleged conspirator in the assassination of Martin Luther King Jr.
- John McAfee (1945–2021), founder of McAfee Associates and politician, former resident
- Sam Taylor (1916–1990) – saxophonist
- Christopher Harris Williams (1798–1857), U.S. representative from Tennessee
