= Red Webb =

American baseball player (1924-1996)

- Pitcher
- Born: September 25, 1924; Washington, D.C., U.S.
- Died: February 7, 1996 (aged 71); Hyattsville, Maryland, U.S.
- Batted: Left Threw: Right

MLB debut
- September 15, 1948, for the New York Giants

Last MLB appearance
- July 22, 1949, for the New York Giants

MLB statistics
- Win–loss record: 3–2
- Earned run average: 3.72
- Innings pitched: 722/3
- Strikeouts: 18
- Stats at Baseball Reference

Teams
- New York Giants (1948–1949)

Samuel Henry "Red" Webb (September 25, 1924 – February 7, 1996) was an American professional baseball player. A 6 ft (1.8 m), 175 lb (79 kg) right-handed pitcher, he appeared in 25 Major League games, 22 in relief, for the 1948–1949 New York Giants.

The Washington, D.C., native graduated from McKinley Tech High School and served in the United States Coast Guard during World War II. He signed his first pro baseball contract with the Giants' organization and made his debut in 1946. In his first three minor league seasons, he won 18, 19 and 18 games in leagues ranging from Class C to Triple-A.

Called up to the Giants in September 1948, he got into five games, including his only three starting pitcher assignments in the Majors. He went 2–1 in those starts, including a complete game win over the National League champion Boston Braves on the season's next-to-last day. He began 1949 in the Giants' bullpen, but was plagued by a sore arm and spent part of the season with the Triple-A Jersey City Giants. On June 1, he recorded his last MLB win, when he relieved starter Andy Hansen in the third inning with the Chicago Cubs leading 4–1. Webb allowed only one unearned run over the next 71/3 innings as the Giants came back to win, 11–5.

During the 1949–1950 offseason, he was to prove valuable to the Giants one final time when he was included in a blockbuster trade with the Braves on December 14. In that transaction, he accompanied Sid Gordon, Buddy Kerr and Willard Marshall to Boston in exchange for Alvin Dark and Eddie Stanky. Although the trade was initially seen as lop-sided in Boston's favor, it ultimately swung heavily in the other direction when shortstop Dark and second baseman Stanky were key pieces of the 1951 Giants who stormed back from a huge mid-August deficit to win the National League pennant.

Webb, meanwhile, never appeared in a Boston Braves' uniform and pitched in only one game for the Triple-A Milwaukee Brewers in 1950 before retiring due to arm trouble.

He died in 1996 at the age of 71 in Hyattsville, Maryland.
