= Andy Hansen =

American baseball player (1924-2002)

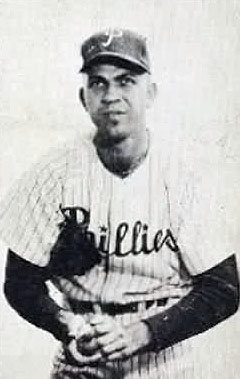
- Hansen in his final major-league season
- Pitcher
- Born: November 12, 1924; Lake Worth, Florida, U.S.
- Died: February 2, 2002 (aged 77); Lake Worth, Florida, U.S.
- Batted: Right Threw: Right

MLB debut
- June 30, 1944, for the New York Giants

Last MLB appearance
- September 13, 1953, for the Philadelphia Phillies

MLB statistics
- Win–loss record: 23–30
- Earned run average: 4.22
- Strikeouts: 188
- Stats at Baseball Reference

Teams
- New York Giants (1944–1945, 1947–1950); Philadelphia Phillies (1951–1953)

Andrew Viggo Hansen Jr. (November 12, 1924 – February 2, 2002), nicknamed "Swede", was an American right-handed pitcher in Major League Baseball. In a nine-season career, he played for the New York Giants and the Philadelphia Phillies. Hansen was officially listed as standing 6 feet 3 inches (191 cm) and weighing 185 pounds (84 kg). He was nicknamed Swede despite being of Danish ancestry, according to The Sporting News' Baseball Register.

A two-sport star in high school, Hansen rose quickly through the Giants' minor league system and made his major league debut at age 19. He played for the Giants until 1946, when he voluntarily retired due to a family illness and then served in the United States Army. He returned to baseball in 1947 and earned a career-best five wins in 1948. After a contract holdout in 1949, Hansen's bullpen workload increased in 1950, leading to an elbow injury and the Giants sending him to the Phillies in the Rule 5 draft.

Hansen worked nearly exclusively from the bullpen after being an occasional starting pitcher with New York. After tying his career high with five victories in 1952, Hansen went winless in 1953 and had a short tenure with the minor-league Hollywood Stars before retiring and beginning a 31-year career with the United States Postal Service.

== Early life ==
Hansen was born November 12, 1924, in Lake Worth, Florida. As a young player, he was a second baseman and third baseman before moving to pitcher. He attended Lake Worth High School, where he played offensive end on the football team and pitched for the baseball team. In 1942, Hansen was a member of Lake Worth's "Trojans" football team that went undefeated, and the school's baseball team went to the state tournament in the 1943 season with Hansen as a member of the pitching staff. After graduating that year, Hansen spurned football scholarship offers from "a number of schools, including Georgia Tech" to sign an amateur free agent contract worth $75 ($1,360 today) per month with the National League's New York Giants.

== Early career ==
=== Minor leagues ===
The Giants assigned Hansen to their Appalachian League affiliate, the Bristol Twins, where, at age 18, he posted a "sensational [win–loss] record" of 12–3 in 16 games started. He allowed 39 runs in 115 innings pitched while walking 15 batters. Hansen began the 1944 season pitching for the Jersey City Giants, New York's top-level farm team. Managed by Hall of Fame catcher Gabby Hartnett, Hansen posted an 8–4 record, compiling a 1.89 earned run average (ERA) in 11 starts and 4 relief appearances. He allowed 90 hits and 28 walks in 100 innings pitched (1.18 WHIP).

=== 1944: Major league debut ===
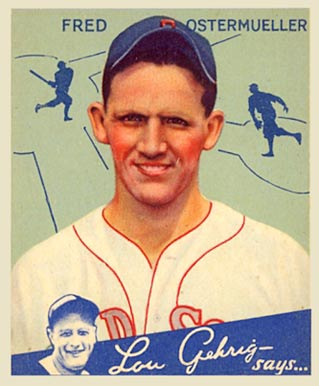
In 1944, Hansen opposed Fritz Ostermueller during his major league debut.

Hansen was called up to the major league club to make his debut on June 30, 1944, in place of Cliff Melton. He started the second game of a doubleheader against the Pittsburgh Pirates, pitching 2 1/3 innings, striking out two and allowing six earned runs. However, the Giants scored five runs in the sixth inning against Pirates starter Fritz Ostermueller, so Hansen did not receive a decision; the Giants lost the contest, 9–8. His first career loss came the next week on July 5, a 4–1 defeat against the St. Louis Cardinals. Hansen pitched six innings and allowed four runs, but Cardinals starter Red Munger, 10–2 on the season to that point, pitched a complete game and allowed only one run. He lost again on July 9, this time to the Chicago Cubs in the first game of a doubleheader. Hansen pitched only 2 2/3 innings, allowing five runs, before being relieved by Rube Fischer.

Hansen earned his first win a week later, an 8–3 victory over the Philadelphia Phillies on July 16. The victory came in relief of Frank Seward, who started the game but pitched only one inning. He pitched four innings, allowing only one run; Ace Adams followed with four scoreless innings and earned the save. His fourth decision, a second career victory, did not come until July 31, when he defeated future teammate Jim Konstanty in a 9–7 victory over the Cincinnati Reds. Hansen appeared again in a relief role, but pitched eight innings of one-run ball after starter Bill Voiselle allowed six runs in the game's first inning. At the plate, Hansen got his first major-league hit and scored his second career run while striking out once.

Philadelphia provided Hansen with his third career win as well; it came on August 4 when he pitched against Ken Raffensberger. Hansen entered in the eighth inning and pitched three scoreless frames in relief of Voiselle as the game went to extra innings. The Giants won, 4–3, on a 10th-inning run with no one out. Sporting a 3–2 record, Hansen earned his first career save against the Phillies on August 6, pitching two scoreless innings in relief of Harry Feldman and striking out two. It was his only save of the season. He lost his third decision of the year on August 19, allowing five runs and walking six batters in the Giants' 12th consecutive loss out of a season-long 13-game streak. For his rookie season, Hansen finished with a 3–3 record and a 6.49 ERA in 52 2/3 innings pitched; he appeared in 23 games (4 starts) and struck out 15 batters while walking 32 at age 19.

=== 1945–1946: New York, Jersey City, and the Army ===
In the 1945 season, Hansen spent most of his playing time with the major league Giants, appearing in 23 games for them that year. Described by Baseball-Reference.com as New York's fifth starter, he was the Giants' youngest pitcher, and second-youngest player (Whitey Lockman), in 1945.

Hansen started New York's third game of the season, pitching against the Boston Braves; he struck out three and allowed one run through seven innings, earning the victory. He defeated Raffensberger and the Phillies again on April 24, pitching his first career complete game in a 5–2 Giants win. After that game, manager Mel Ott said that he was encouraged by the performance because pitching was a concern of the Giants entering the season. Hansen's first loss of the season came against the Brooklyn Dodgers, a 4–3 defeat. After dueling to a stalemate in a tie game with Boston—he and Braves starter Al Javery each allowed one run through seven innings in the second half of a rain-shortened doubleheader—Hansen earned his third victory on May 13 against the Cardinals; it was the last game of New York's season-long eight-game winning streak. Hansen earned a no decision in a May 17 start against the Cubs, but a 5–2 loss to the Pirates on May 21 dropped his record to 3–2; he allowed four earned runs in four innings. His first save of the season came on May 24, when he pitched two innings following Adams, the regular closer, who earned the win; his final decision in May was a victory over Cincinnati, a 5–1 win which was the last in a four-game win streak. He started the first game of a doubleheader on May 30, pitching 2 1/3 innings and allowing six runs; the Giants managed an 8–6 win, however, as Slim Emmerich relieved him and pitched 6 2/3 scoreless innings.

In early June, Hansen pitched in both games of a doubleheader against the Cardinals; he started the first game (allowing two runs in 1/3 of an inning) and relieved Feldman in the second (pitching 5 1/3 innings and giving up three runs). He earned his second save of the season pitching 1 2/3 perfect innings against Brooklyn in relief of Van Mungo on June 7, but followed that with his third loss against Boston, where he allowed three runs in six innings. The third loss was Hansen's final major league decision of the season. He pitched in four more games in June, starting on June 15 and allowing four earned runs in five innings, and pitching in relief on June 17, 22, and 24. He picked up a save in his final June game, pitching the final third of an inning in relief of Voiselle and Feldman in a 7–6 victory over Philadelphia. On June 26, Hansen reported to Camp Blanding in his home state of Florida for a pre-induction examination for the United States Army; his service commitment had previously been deferred due to a breathing handicap from an earlier broken nose.

In July, Hansen appeared for the first time on Independence Day, pitching 1/3 of an inning in relief of Emmerich and allowing three runs. His final start of 1945 came against the Reds on July 7; he allowed four runs through 1 1/3 innings as the Giants won, 11–7. Hansen allowed two runs in four innings facing the Cubs on July 15, and gave up three runs in 1 1/3 against the Pirates on July 20. His final outing of the season was also his shortest; he allowed a run to Boston without putting out a single batter in the second game of a doubleheader.

At the beginning of August, Hansen injured his shoulder and was optioned to Jersey City in favor of Sal Maglie, where he appeared in five games (1–3, 7.31 ERA). After serving seven months in the military, Hansen asked the team to voluntarily retire him in early 1946 due to his father's severe illness. He did not appear in a game at any level during the 1946 season, but stated that he did not plan to give up baseball as a career.

== After the military ==
=== 1947: One win for New York ===
Hansen returned to the Giants in April 1947, pitching a scoreless ninth inning in his first appearance against the Phillies. In his second game back, he allowed four runs to the Braves, working three innings in relief of Monty Kennedy; the Giants lost the game, 14–5. Hansen did not appear for the Giants in May, but returned to action on June 1 for his first start of the season. After allowing four runs in 1/3 of an inning, Hansen was relieved by Junior Thompson, who earned the victory as the Giants defeated the Reds, 13–9; the outing raised Hansen's ERA to a season-high 16.62. He did not appear again for New York until June 21, when he pitched 1/3 of an inning against the Cardinals, allowing no runs. As the summer months continued, Hansen was used more heavily; he made six appearances in July, all in Giants losses. On July 2, he pitched the final inning of an 11–3 loss to Brooklyn, allowing no hits. Hansen allowed runs in each of his next two outings, both against St. Louis: he pitched two innings on July 10, and threw five innings on July 12 in the second game of a doubleheader. In a 10–5 loss to the Cardinals on July 22, Hansen made his third consecutive appearance against the Redbirds, allowing no earned runs in 1 2/3 innings. On July 28, he turned in a hitless, scoreless performance against Cincinnati, working one inning in a 5–0 shutout, and received his first decision—a loss—against the Reds on the final day of that month in an 8–7 contest.

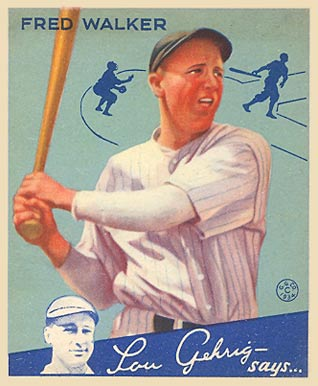
Dixie Walker was responsible for Hansen's hand injury on August 30, 1947.

In August, Hansen appeared in nine games, his most in a single month during the 1947 season; he began on August 3 by allowing two runs to the Pirates in 1/3 of an inning. He made his second start of the season against the Braves on August 10; although he pitched 7 1/3 innings and allowed just three runs, he did not factor in the decision. Closer Ken Trinkle, who relieved Hansen, took the loss after a three-run home run by Tommy Holmes in the ninth inning as the Giants lost, 7–5. After a one-inning appearance against the Phillies on August 13, Hansen made his third start of the year on August 17 and notched his second loss of the season, this time to Boston. He allowed one run through seven innings, but the Braves defeated New York, 3–1. The defeat was Hansen's first of four consecutive appearances in the second games of doubleheaders, the third of which was another start and his third loss of the year. He allowed the game's only runs in a 3 2/3 inning performance; the Giants lost, 4–0. After two more multi-inning relief appearances against Chicago on August 24 and 25, Hansen pitched seven innings in a start against Brooklyn in what would be his last appearance in the month. He allowed one run in seven innings, walking six batters. In the seventh inning, his middle finger was bruised by a line drive hit up the middle by Dixie Walker. Hansen walked Arky Vaughan, the first batter in the eighth inning, before leaving the game, and Cookie Lavagetto singled with the bases loaded to drive in the winning runs for the Dodgers; the Giants fell, 3–1.

Hansen returned to the mound on September 4, starting his sixth game of the season. Although he pitched eight innings and allowed two runs, Hansen earned his fourth loss of the season, as the Giants lost to Brooklyn, 2–0. His next outing, which came in relief against the Dodgers, was scoreless, but he allowed four runs in three innings to the Pirates the following day. After two more scoreless relief appearances, Hansen started against the Phillies on September 20. He pitched a complete game, allowing three runs (two earned) on four hits; the 5–3 victory was his only win of the 1947 season, defeating Philadelphia starter Ken Heintzelman. Hansen appeared twice more in the 1947 season: he pitched 2 1/3 innings in a start against the Dodgers on September 24, allowing four runs; and he lost his final start of the season against the Phillies four days later, pitching four innings and allowing three runs. For the season, Hansen posted a 1–5 record, a 4.37 ERA, and 18 strikeouts in 27 games as a 22-year-old, the Giants' second-youngest pitcher (Mario Picone).

=== 1948: One hundred innings, five victories ===
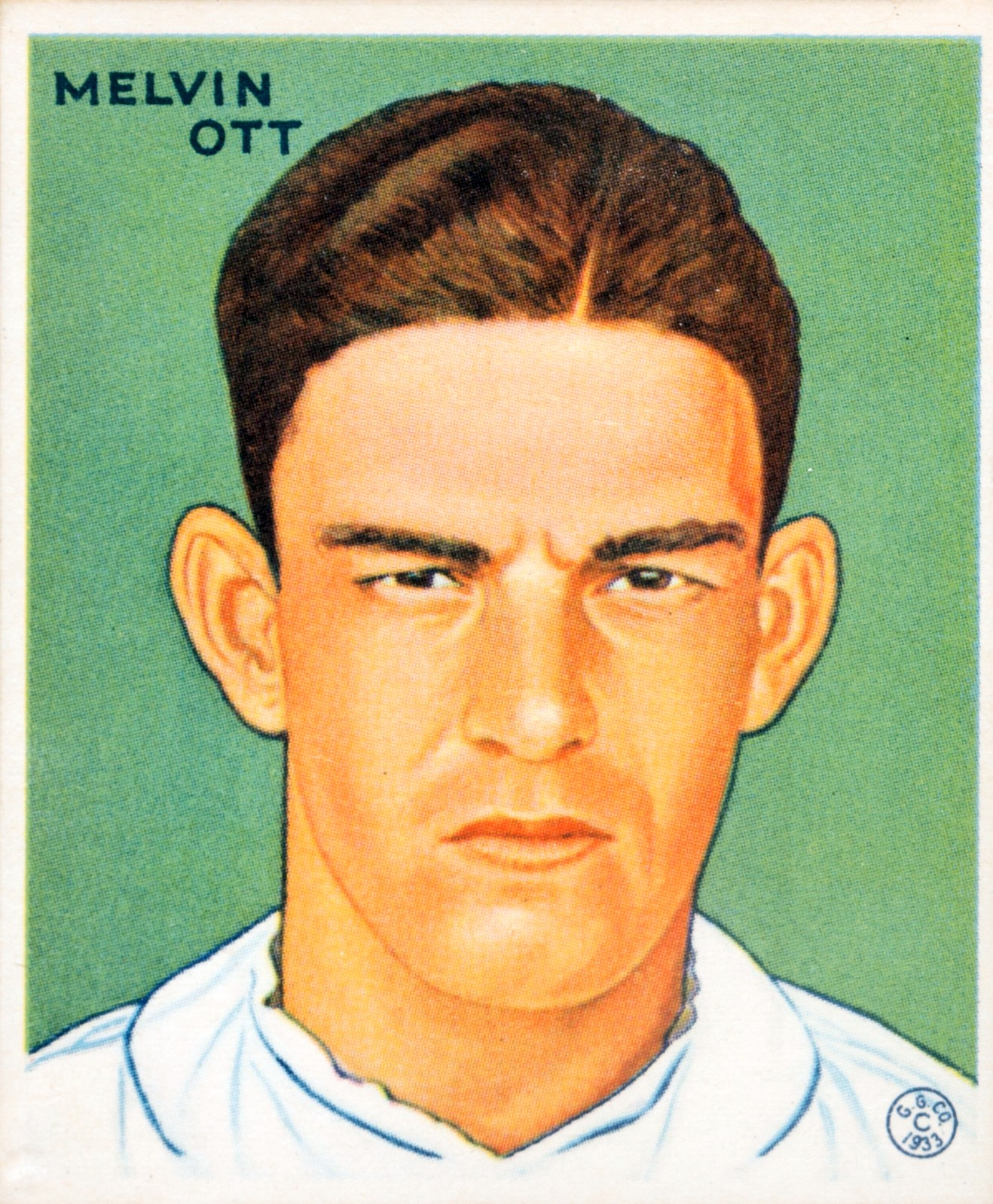
Mel Ott was Hansen's manager in 1944 and 1945, and again from 1947 to 1948.

Hansen opened his 1948 campaign with five consecutive scoreless appearances. His first game was on April 22, when he pitched 1/3 of an inning against the Dodgers, walking one batter and allowing a single hit. His second game was also against Brooklyn; he allowed two hits and a walk in 2/3 of an inning in his final April appearance. After a 21-day layoff, Hansen returned to play on May 21, pitching a scoreless inning against the Chicago Cubs. Two more scoreless innings prompted Ott to start Hansen against the Dodgers in the second game of a May 31 doubleheader, and Hansen pitched a complete game to earn his first win of the season, allowing only one unearned run in the 10–1 victory.

Hansen's June appearances consisted of three starts and five relief outings. In two of his three starts, he lasted two innings or less, allowing three runs in two frames to Cincinnati on June 4, and four runs in 2/3 of an inning against St. Louis 14 days later. The latter game was his second loss of the season—the first having been earned on July 11 in his other start of the month, wherein he pitched six innings, allowed three runs, and walked five batters. Hansen's appearances from the bullpen were more successful; in 13 1/3 innings, he allowed three runs, all in a single outing on June 24 against the Cubs. His longest appearance of the month was a seven-inning relief outing against the Cardinals on June 13; starter Dave Koslo took the loss in the game for allowing three runs in the game's first inning, and Hansen completed the remainder of the game without allowing a run. In July, Hansen began with a start on July 2, and ended with a win on July 31. His only start in July came against Brooklyn, when he pitched 7 2/3 innings and allowed four runs. He made two appearances in high-scoring games during the month without recording any outs: he faced two batters against Brooklyn on July 4, walking one and allowing a hit; and repeated the outing on July 10, this time allowing two hits and giving up two runs. Between those two outings, he appeared in both games of a July 5 doubleheader against the Braves, pitching two perfect innings in each game. His July victory came against the Cubs, when he struck out two batters and walked none in 2/3 scoreless innings on the month's final day.

In August, Hansen did not earn any decisions, but he did notch his only save of the season in his second August contest. He pitched 1 2/3 scoreless innings against Boston to secure a 6–5 win for Koslo. Three days later, he allowed two earned runs in a three-inning appearance against Philadelphia; they would be the only earned runs he allowed in the entire month of August, lowering his ERA from 3.40 to 3.10. He finished the month with four consecutive scoreless appearances, striking out two batters and walking one between August 15 and August 31. On September 3, Hansen was pressed into service as a starter for the first time in two months of play, and he delivered a quality start for New York, allowing three runs in eight innings pitched—his third victory and first complete game of the season. He was rewarded with another start on September 7, and pitched his second consecutive complete game to earn a fourth win, this time scattering ten hits in nine innings against the Phillies, striking out three batters and allowing only a home run to Bert Haas. Starting again on September 11, Hansen allowed two runs in 1 1/3 innings before being relieved by Koslo; neither pitcher earned the win in the shortened game, as Trinkle pitched the sixth and final inning of the doubleheader's second game to notch the victory. Hansen earned his fifth win out of the bullpen when the Giants came from behind to defeat Cincinnati, 12–7, on September 18, and completed his season record with a loss in a start against Chicago on September 22; he allowed six runs (five earned) on nine hits while walking three hitters and striking out two. For the season, Hansen accumulated a 5–3 record, a 2.97 ERA (his best career season to date), and 27 strikeouts, having faced a career-high 419 batters in 100 innings pitched.

=== 1949: Four consecutive mid-season losses ===
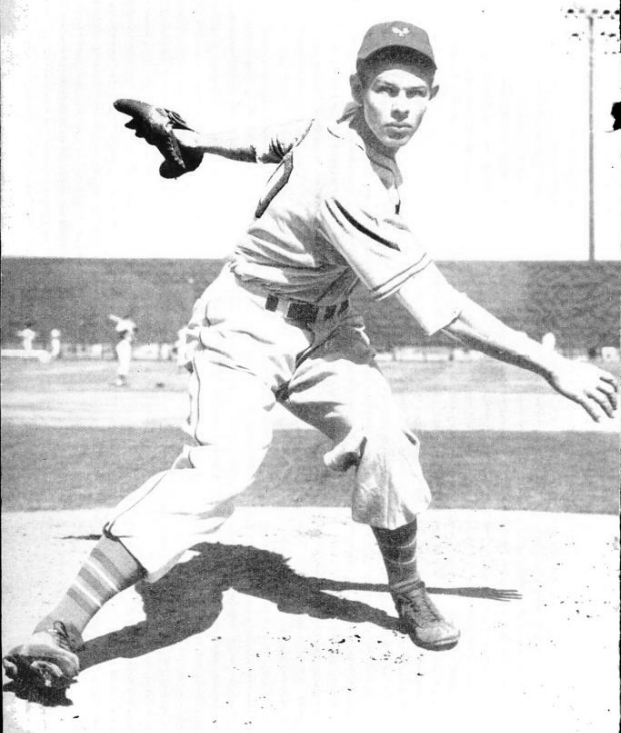
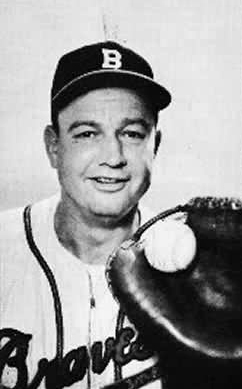
Hansen, Clint Hartung (left), and Walker Cooper (right) were the New York Giants who held out for better contracts before the 1949 season.

After his career-best five wins in the prior season, Hansen held out for a better contract in February 1949, along with another Giants pitcher, Clint Hartung; and Walker Cooper, the Giants' captain. He signed on February 6, and opened the 1949 season pitching in New York's second contest, allowing 1 run while pitching 2 1/3 innings of a 6–2 loss to Brooklyn. Hansen took his first loss of the season in his next contest; after the Phillies and Giants played to a tie in nine innings, New York scored two runs in the top of the 11th, but Hansen, who entered to relieve, allowed three to score while recording only two outs, handing the Giants a 12–11 extra-inning defeat. In the next game against the Dodgers, however, he recorded his first victory of the year behind a pinch-hit inside-the-park grand slam from Pete Milne, pitching a scoreless seventh inning and striking out two. Hansen had one other appearance in April, allowing a single run in three innings against Brooklyn the following day in a 15–2 loss. In the next month, he also made four appearances, the first of which came on May 24; he pitched two scoreless innings against the Cubs. After allowing his only run of the month to the Phillies on May 27, Hansen pitched in both games of a doubleheader on May 30, throwing 1/3 of an inning in the first contest and earning his only save of the season in the second by striking out two batters in 2 2/3 scoreless innings.

On June 1, Hansen started his first game of the season, pitching 1 2/3 innings and allowing four runs; he was replaced by Red Webb, who pitched the remaining 7 1/3 and won the game, 11–5. Hansen earned his second defeat of the season on June 12, when he allowed a single game-winning run to the Pirates in 5 2/3 innings of work; he walked three batters and struck out five in the contest. He appeared in back-to-back games on June 17 and 18: a 6–4 loss to Pittsburgh the first day, and a 5–4 win for New York on the second. This game would be his last appearance in a Giants win until the season's final month. His next two outings—against the Cardinals on June 22 and the Cubs on June 24—were perfect; he allowed no baserunners until June 25, when he gave up a single hit to Chicago in a 4–1 defeat. His final appearance of June came in the first game of a June 30 with the Boston Braves, in which he pitched two innings and allowed one hit. In July, Hansen struggled mightily, appearing in four games; each contest was a loss for the Giants, and each decision was tallied against him. On July 2, he allowed 5 runs in 4 2/3 innings against Brooklyn, walking one batter and allowing two home runs. His five runs allowed accounted for the Dodgers' margin of victory in the 13–8 Giants defeat. He pitched four innings in relief of Sheldon Jones on July 10, suffering the loss when he walked three batters and allowed three runs to score. Hansen's one run allowed on July 16 proved once again to be his undoing as the Pirates defeated the Giants, 7–6, and dropped his record to 1–5; nevertheless, he earned the start against Pittsburgh on July 26 and took his sixth loss, allowing 4 runs on 4 walks in 4 1/3 innings to finish July at 1–6 on the season.

In August, all of Hansen's appearances came in Giants losses, the first of which was on August 7—he pitched the two final innings against the Cardinals, allowing one hit but no runs. After a scoreless inning on August 12, Hansen appeared in back-to-back games against Boston on August 17 and 18, walking one and striking out one in the former game and allowing two runs in 1/3 of an inning in the latter. He allowed a run to Philadelphia on August 19, then pitched in consecutive games on August 27 and 28, the second and first games of doubleheaders, respectively. The Giants lost to St. Louis, 11–2, on August 27; Hansen allowed one unearned run in that game. The next day, he pitched two perfect innings against the Cincinnati Reds, striking out one, but New York was defeated, 10–3. In his first September game, Hansen earned his final decision of the season when he defeated Pittsburgh, 9–5, pitching one scoreless inning in relief of Hank Behrman. He pitched the next game as well—the following day against Brooklyn—but the Giants were shut out, 8–0. He made a scoreless appearance against Philadelphia on September 6, and allowed 4 runs in 1 1/3 innings on September 8, raising his ERA from 4.18 to 4.64. Hansen made his final appearance on September 11 with a perfect 1/3 of an inning, striking out the only batter he faced; his final game of the season was logged on September 18, but he faced no batters and did not physically appear in the game. His final record for the year was two wins against six losses; he amassed 26 strikeouts and 28 bases on balls, allowing an average of 4.61 runs per nine innings.

=== 1950: Midseason injury ===
In April 1950, Hansen appeared in two games. His first appearance of the season came against the rival Dodgers; he pitched two scoreless innings, giving up three hits and walking two batters. A week later, he pitched the fourth inning of another contest against Brooklyn, this time allowing no baserunners. His first game the next month came against the Pirates on May 6, where he earned his first save of the season in a 9–8 victory. All of his other appearances in May, however, came in New York losses. On May 14, Hansen started the second game of a doubleheader against Philadelphia, pitching 4 1/3 innings and allowing five runs on eight hits and two walks. The following week, he appeared in both games of a twinbill against the Pirates, pitching a combination perfect inning between the two contests: 2/3 in the first and 1/3 in the second. Beginning on May 25, Hansen pitched in four consecutive games to close out his month, allowing 1 run in 2 1/3 innings in the first contest and throwing a scoreless frame in the second. On May 27, he struck out one batter and allowed a single hit in 2 1/3 innings, and earned his first loss of the year in an extra-inning defeat by the Phillies the following day; he entered the game in the seventh inning and allowed 3 runs over 4 1/3 frames to total a 5–2 final score.

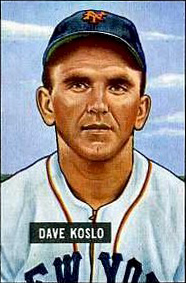
Hansen relieved Dave Koslo on July 2 after the starter gave up multiple first-inning runs without recording an out.

In June, Hansen began a heavy workload from the Giants' bullpen; the converted starter, who had never appeared in more than nine games in a single month in his major league career, was pressed into service 11 times in the third month of the season. On the month's first day, Hansen pitched in both games of a doubleheader against Cincinnati, throwing a perfect 1/3 of an inning in the first half, and three scoreless in the second contest. The following day, he blew a save against the Reds in the sixth inning, allowing two hits and recording no outs. Against the Pirates on June 5, he recorded his second save of the season in a 5–4, ten-inning win, and followed it with another on June 8 in Chicago. On June 10, Hansen allowed 2 runs in 1 1/3 innings against the Cardinals, and the next week gave up four runs to the Cubs by facing 12 batters. Two scoreless outings on June 19 and 21 were followed by an appearance in Game 1 of a June 25 doubleheader; he gave up one run on three hits and one walk. His final June appearance came against the Braves, a scoreless inning in which he walked two batters.

The workload continued into July, when Hansen appeared in the first game of a July 2 doubleheader. He entered in the first inning in relief of starter Koslo, who allowed two runs without recording an out; none of the Giants' pitchers in the 11–5 defeat escaped unscathed, as all allowed at least two runs, topped by Hansen's five. His next two appearances came on July 4, as he pitched both games of a doubleheader against the Dodgers; he tossed two innings in each contest, striking out two in the first game and walking one in the nightcap. On July 5, he gave up five runs in the seventh inning against Philadelphia, recording two outs and allowing five hits. In his next two outings against Boston and Pittsburgh, he allowed no runs, but the game against the Pirates would be his last scoreless outing with New York. Pitching against the Reds on July 16, Hansen allowed 3 runs in 1 1/3 innings; this was followed by four runs given up against the Cardinals on July 19. His final contest of the season came on July 25, when he pitched four innings against Cincinnati, allowing two runs before injuring his pitching elbow. Speaking with manager Leo Durocher, he claimed to feel a painless pop in his elbow as he threw a pitch; two hours later, the elbow had swollen "as big as a football" and visibly bruised, ending his season. Hansen ended the season with an 0–1 record, a 5.53 ERA, and 19 strikeouts; thereafter, he was selected by the Phillies in the Rule 5 draft.

== Philadelphia ==
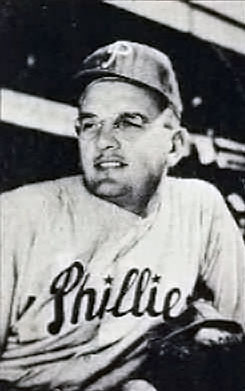
A blown save by Jim Konstanty in July 1951 cost Hansen a chance at his first victory of the year.

=== 1951: Return to the majors ===
After acquiring Hansen, the Phillies assigned him to the Triple-A Baltimore Orioles. He was called up to the major league club in July after posting a 1–1 record with a 5.45 ERA and 14 strikeouts, working exclusively from Baltimore's bullpen. Hansen's first appearance with Philadelphia came on July 6; he pitched two innings in relief of Russ Meyer, who allowed three runs without recording an out. Three straight appearances in doubleheader openers followed Hansen's Phillies debut: he faced two Cardinals batters without a putout on July 15; pitched two scoreless innings against Cincinnati two days later; and could have earned his first victory of the season on July 22 had Konstanty—the closer and 1950's National League Most Valuable Player—not collected his fifth blown save of the year. Hansen pitched in three more games that month, recording his first decision of the season on July's final day: he defeated the Reds, 7–5, pitching one inning and allowing two runs.

Hansen appeared in five games for the Phillies in August. All were multi-inning appearances as a relief pitcher, and only one was not scoreless—he allowed four runs to the Braves in 2 1/3 innings on August 15. He opened September with a victory, however—a 5–3 win over Boston—to raise his record to 2–0; it was his first of eleven appearances in the season's final month. Including the September 2 victory, Hansen finished three of his first four games for Philadelphia in the month, allowing no runs in any of those four appearances. The Pirates notched Hansen's first September runs allowed on the month's 12th day; although none of the runs were earned, Hansen still collected his only defeat of the 1951 season.

In his next appearance, Hansen struck out a season-high four Cardinals in 1 2/3 innings pitched on September 16; it was his only appearance in 1951 wherein he struck out multiple batters. Following a scoreless two-inning appearance against the Cubs on September 18, Hansen pitched the eighth inning against the Dodgers on September 23, allowing his first earned runs in over a month. After relieving starter Ken Johnson in the first inning of September 26's contest—pitching two innings and allowing one run—Hansen earned his final decision of the season on September 28, pitching three scoreless frames against Brooklyn to earn his third win. His 1951 season ended with a single scoreless inning the following day, also against the Dodgers; this lowered his season ERA to 2.54, the best mark among Phillies pitchers that year, and a career low for Hansen. On the season, he struck out 11 batters while walking 7, allowing 34 hits in 39 innings of work.

=== 1952: Four-save July ===
Hansen's 1952 season did not open auspiciously; he appeared in the Phillies' second game of the season, entering in the ninth inning and allowing a sacrifice fly to the Giants' Alvin Dark with the bases loaded. Although it was no blemish on Hansen's ERA—the runner having been allowed by starter Howie Fox—he still earned a blown save in his first appearance of the year. His second appearance two days later was worse: Hansen entered the game in the eighth inning with a 7–6 lead, but allowed two runs in the top of the ninth, and a third earned was added to his tally after closer Konstanty, who relieved Hansen, allowed a sacrifice fly immediately thereafter. The Braves, Philadelphia's opponents in that contest, won the game, 9–7, and Hansen was saddled with his second blown save in as many appearances and his first loss of the season. His next three appearances were scoreless, but on May 16, he entered in the eighth inning of a game against the Reds with the Phillies leading, 2–1, and runners on first and second bases. He allowed a single to Bobby Adams, scoring Roy McMillan and blowing his third save, but the Phillies would win, 3–2, after Heintzelman pitched 2 1/3 scoreless innings and the Phillies used small ball tactics (a walk to Eddie Waitkus, Heintzelman reaching on a fielder's choice, and a bunt single by Richie Ashburn) to load the bases in the bottom of the tenth inning, winning on a single by Granny Hamner. After two scoreless appearances against St. Louis and New York, Hansen allowed one run in a three-inning appearance against his former club on May 24. Hansen pitched in both extra-inning games of a doubleheader on May 27, pitching the twelfth and final inning against Boston in a 4–2 loss in the first contest, and earning his first victory in the tenth inning of the second after Del Ennis' triple and Willie Jones' sacrifice fly scored the winning run in the bottom half of the frame. Three more relief appearances closed out the month, two of them scoreless; his only run allowed was against the Pirates on the final day of May.

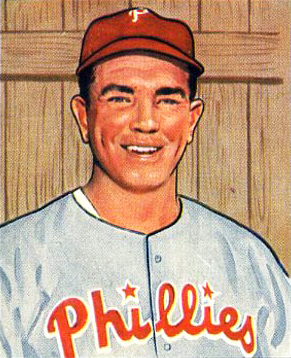
Willie Jones' June 29 throwing error cost Hansen three unearned runs.

Hansen's June was also inauspicious, as all six of his appearances came in Phillies losses. He had two scoreless one-inning stints against the Reds and the Cubs on June 5 and 10, respectively, before a three-inning appearance against the Pirates in the first game of a June 15 doubleheader. In the contest, he struck out one and walked one in a scoreless outing to lower his ERA to 2.75, and followed with a scoreless inning on June 19 to push it down to 2.61, his lowest to that point of the season. He allowed his only earned runs of the month on June 22, when Hansen walked the bases loaded in the top of the ninth inning against Cincinnati; Konstanty entered, allowing a double to former teammate Andy Seminick that scored two. In his final June game, he allowed three runs, but none were earned due to a throwing error by third baseman Willie "Puddin' Head" Jones. At the end of June and beginning of July, closer Konstanty blew two saves, one of which resulted in a 4–3 loss to Brooklyn, so Hansen assumed some of the closing duties for the season's fourth month. He collected his first save of the season on the second of July, pitching two scoreless innings against the Dodgers in relief of Russ Meyer. After allowing two runs to the Cardinals on July 10, Hansen bounced back with consecutive saves—on July 13 against Chicago; and again on July 16 versus the Pirates, in which Hansen relieved Roberts after the latter allowed a two-run ninth-inning home run. On July 22, he earned his fourth save of the month in a two-inning performance against Pittsburgh, and closed the month with two consecutive victories, defeating the Cubs on July 27, and the Reds two days after.

In August, Hansen pitched 4 1/3 innings in the team's first contest, allowing two runs to the Cardinals on four hits and losing his third game of the season. He appeared in three consecutive doubleheaders (August 9, 11, and 13) and followed by pitching 1/3 of an inning in a 15–0 loss at Brooklyn on August 16. Hansen rested until August 22, when he relieved Curt Simmons against the Cincinnati Reds; he pitched 3 2/3 innings, allowing two runs on three hits, walking two, and absorbing a fourth loss. Beginning on August 24, he finished three games against the Cubs on consecutive game-days: pitching a perfect inning on August 24; earning a win with two scoreless innings on August 25; and taking the loss on August 26 in the 13th inning of the series' final contest. He bounced back to close the month with a fifth win, though, defeating Boston, 8–6, behind a 5 1/3-inning relief performance. In his first September game, Hansen took the loss by allowing a single run to the Giants on the month's third day; he finished the month by pitching in two consecutive losses, with his final appearance coming on September 12. For the season, he finished with a 5–6 record, a 3.26 ERA, and 18 strikeouts in a team-leading 43 games pitched—a year in which his performance was described as "excellent relieving".

=== 1953: Last major league year ===
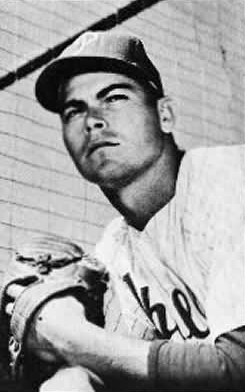
Jack "Lucky" Lohrke and Hansen were traded to the Pittsburgh Pirates after the 1953 season.

Hansen's first game of the 1953 season resulted in his first loss; in a 14–12 contest against the Pirates, he allowed four runs—one earned—in the fifth frame, the only inning he pitched. His next appearance resulted in his first save of the year, coming against Pittsburgh on April 25, and he pitched in his final April game three days later against St. Louis. Hansen's first appearance in May came against the newly relocated Milwaukee Braves, late of Boston, when he allowed a walk and two hits, one a home run, in a single inning. He threw a scoreless frame against Brooklyn on May 10, and a perfect 1/3 on May 12 to earn his second save. He allowed two runs against Milwaukee on May 18, but both were unearned, lowering his ERA to a season-low 2.25; three runs in his next appearance, however, raised his average to its highest point since the year's first game. His last game in May was against Pittsburgh: 2/3 of an inning with one unearned run allowed.

Hansen opened June with a doubleheader, pitching in both games and allowing no runs; he gave up a hit in the first game and walked a batter in the second, striking out one batter in each contest. He pitched the ninth inning in both games, earning his third save of the year in the nightcap. He gave up two runs to the Braves in his next appearance, allowing a home run and an RBI single in three innings. On June 9, he again allowed two runs, this time to the Cubs; the two home runs given up resulted in his first blown save of the season. After a perfect inning against Cincinnati on June 12, he made his first scoreless appearance against Milwaukee in the season; he allowed two hits in 1/3 of an inning but neither runner scored. On June 17, he faced the Braves again, this time pitching three scoreless innings and allowing two singles and a double. Waiting ten days until his next appearance, Hansen took the mound for two scoreless innings against St. Louis, and earned a hold on June 30 against Brooklyn after Konstanty blew a save. In his first July game, he pitched 3 1/3 innings, allowing two runs on three hits and walking three batters. Two days later, he pitched five scoreless innings within both halves of a doubleheader against his former team, the Giants; he walked one batter in each game and struck out three hitters in the second. After an 11-day hiatus, he returned to the hill in an 11–0 loss to the Reds, allowing an unearned run on three hits in relief of Konstanty. One-and-two-thirds scoreless innings against the Cubs on July 21 was his final scoreless outing of the month, followed by a single run allowed to the Braves on July 27 and two runs given up to the Reds three days later.

On August 3, Hansen entered in the second inning of a contest against the Reds after Konstanty and Thornton Kipper allowed 7 runs in 1 2/3 innings against the Reds; he pitched 4 1/3 frames and allowed 1 run. On August 17, he made his first start in three years, absorbing the loss as the Phillies were shut out, 6–0. His final two August games came on back-to-back days: the second half of a doubleheader on August 30 (1 walk and 1 strikeout in 2 2/3 scoreless innings); and the first half of a twinbill on August 31 (one run allowed on one walk and two hits in a single inning). He made one September appearance, allowing two runs without recording an out; for the year, he finished with an 0–2 record and three saves with a 4.03 ERA. After the conclusion of the season, Hansen was traded with Jack Lohrke and $70,000 ($823,000 today) to Pittsburgh in exchange for Murry Dickson.

In 270 games, Hansen posted only a .102 batting average (12-for-118) with only 3 RBI. He was excellent defensively, recording a .989 fielding percentage with only two errors in 179 total chances. He handled his first 162 chances in the majors successfully until he committed his first error in his final appearance in the 1952 season.

== After the majors ==
In 1954, Hansen was assigned to the Pirates-affiliated Hollywood Stars, an Open-classification minor league team based in Los Angeles. He appeared in three games, accumulating a 1.35 ERA on the mound and one hit in three at-bats at the plate. In one of those contests, he and Red Munger combined to hold the rival Los Angeles Angels to a 1–0 shutout. After being voted outstanding player of the week for his short tenure, Hansen voluntarily retired himself a second time after Pittsburgh Pirates president Branch Rickey refused to pay him $750 ($8,780 today) that he was owed. The Pirates sent him a contract to play for the Triple-A New Orleans Pelicans, along with a paycheck, but he did not report, opting to remain retired.

Hansen was first married to Bertha Mae (née Perkins), also a native of Lake Worth, Florida. They had two children, one a daughter named Gale Andra, before his wife contracted cancer and died. He had dated his second wife, Joy, when he was playing for the Giants in his early career, and they were described as "recently wedded" when interviewed by author Wes Singletary for his 2006 book. Hansen worked seasonally for the United States Postal Service during his baseball career, and became a permanent employee for 31 years until retiring. In 1988, he was inducted into the Palm Beach County Sports Commission's Hall of Fame. He died on February 2, 2002, in his hometown.
