= Garvin Hamner =

American baseball player (1924-2003)

- Second baseman / Shortstop
- Born: March 18, 1924; Richmond, Virginia, U.S.
- Died: December 15, 2003 (aged 79); Richmond, Virginia, U.S.
- Batted: Right Threw: Right

MLB debut
- April 17, 1945, for the Philadelphia Phillies

Last MLB appearance
- June 7, 1945, for the Philadelphia Phillies

MLB statistics
- Batting average: .198
- Home runs: 0
- Runs batted in: 5
- Stats at Baseball Reference

Teams
- Philadelphia Phillies (1945)

Wesley Garvin Hamner (March 18, 1924 – December 15, 2003) was an American professional baseball player. A second baseman and shortstop, he appeared in one season (1945) for the Philadelphia Phillies of Major League Baseball. His younger brother, Granny Hamner, would become the Phillies' star shortstop of the 1950 "Whiz Kids" National League championship team, while Garvin spent all but two months of his 11-year career in minor league baseball.

The two Hamners were teammates briefly on the 1945 Phils. While Granny was the better prospect, and had a 17-year MLB career, the similarity in their names caused a mixup during the 1947 Rule 5 draft. The St. Louis Browns had scouted Granny and wanted to draft him off the Phils' Utica Blue Sox minor-league roster. But they selected Garvin's name by mistake – and Granny remained with the Phillies, for whom he would later star.

Garvin Hamner, a lifelong resident of Richmond, Virginia, threw and batted right-handed, stood 5 feet 11 inches (1.80 m) tall and weighed 172 pounds (78 kg). In 32 Major League games in 1945, he collected 20 hits in 101 at bats, including three doubles, for a batting average of .198. He was sent to the Atlanta Crackers of the Southern Association in June and played the rest of his career in the minors. He died at age 79 in Richmond.
