= Roy Zimmerman (baseball) =

American baseball player

- First baseman
- Born: September 13, 1913; Pine Grove, Pennsylvania, U.S.
- Died: November 22, 1991 (aged 78); Pine Grove, Pennsylvania, U.S.
- Batted: Unknown Threw: Right

MLB debut
- September 2, 1945, for the New York Giants

Last MLB appearance
- September 30, 1945, for the New York Giants

MLB statistics
- Batting average: .276
- Home runs: 5
- RBI: 15
- Stats at Baseball Reference

Teams
- New York Giants (1945)

Roy Franklin Zimmerman (September 13, 1913 – November 22, 1991) was an American professional baseball first baseman. He played part of the 1945 season in Major League Baseball for the New York Giants in 1945. He stood 6 ft 2 in (1.88 m) and weighed 187 lbs at the time he was drafted.

Zimmerman is one of many ballplayers who only appeared in the major leagues during World War II. He made his major league debut on September 2, 1945 in a doubleheader against the Brooklyn Dodgers at the Polo Grounds. He hit well and exhibited some power during his one-month stay with the Giants.

Season and career totals include 27 games played, a .276 batting average (27-for-98), 5 home runs, 15 runs batted in, 14 runs scored, and a slugging percentage of .439. He made 3 errors in 25 games at first base and had a fielding percentage of .988.

In 1991, Zimmerman died in his hometown of Pine Grove, Pennsylvania.
