= Don Fisher =

American baseball player (1916-1973)

- Pitcher
- Born: February 6, 1916; Cleveland, Ohio, US
- Died: July 29, 1973 (aged 57); Mayfield Heights, Ohio, US
- Batted: Right Threw: Right

MLB debut
- August 25, 1945, for the New York Giants

Last MLB appearance
- September 30, 1945, for the New York Giants

MLB statistics
- Win–loss record: 1–0
- Earned run average: 2.00
- Strikeouts: 4
- Stats at Baseball Reference

Teams
- New York Giants (1945)

Donald Raymond Fisher (February 6, 1916 – July 29, 1973) was a Major League Baseball pitcher who appeared in two games for the New York Giants in 1945. The 29-year-old rookie was a native of Cleveland, Ohio.

Fisher is one of many ballplayers who only appeared in the major leagues during World War II. Fisher did not play minor league baseball for several years before joining the Giants. The Giants instead signed him directly out of the semi-pro ranks.

He made his major league debut in relief on August 25, 1945, against the Brooklyn Dodgers at Ebbets Field. He pitched the last five innings of one of the games of the doubleheader and gave up four earned runs.

Fisher played his next and last game on September 30, 1945, the last day of the season, he started the first game of a doubleheader against the Boston Braves at Braves Field. He pitched a 13-inning complete game shutout, winning 1–0.

In 18 total innings pitched, Fisher allowed just 19 baserunners and 4 earned runs, giving him an ERA of 2.00 to go along with his 1–0 record.

Fisher died at the age of 57 in Mayfield Heights, Ohio.
