= Dick Mauney =

American baseball player (1920-1970)

- Pitcher
- Born: January 26, 1920; Concord, North Carolina
- Died: February 6, 1970 (aged 50); Albemarle, North Carolina
- Batted: Right Threw: Right

MLB debut
- June 13, 1945, for the Philadelphia Phillies

Last MLB appearance
- June 22, 1947, for the Philadelphia Phillies

MLB statistics
- Win–loss record: 12–14
- Earned run average: 2.99
- Strikeouts: 72
- Stats at Baseball Reference

Teams
- Philadelphia Phillies (1945–1947)

Richard Mauney (January 26, 1920 – February 6, 1970) was an American professional baseball player, a right-handed pitcher who worked in 53 Major League games (24 as a starting pitcher) for the Philadelphia Phillies from 1945 to 1947. Born in Concord, North Carolina, he stood 5 feet 11 inches (1.80 m) tall and weighed 164 pounds (74 kg).

Mauney's 1943–47 pro career spanned both the wartime and post-World War II eras. Unlike many players who were called to the Majors during the war whose performance suffered in 1946, when Major League veterans returned from military service, Mauney enjoyed a better 1946 than his 1945 campaign. He posted a winning record (6–4) in 1946 and lowered his earned run average by 0.38 to 2.70, although he did pitch in 32 2/3 fewer innings in 1946.

Altogether, Mauney appeared in 229 Major League innings pitched, allowing 240 hits and 52 bases on balls. He struck out 72, and recorded nine complete games, three shutouts and four saves.
