= Jack Creel =

American baseball player (1916–2002)

- Pitcher
- Born: April 23, 1916; Kyle, Texas, U.S.
- Died: August 13, 2002 (aged 86); Houston, Texas, U.S.
- Batted: Right Threw: Right

MLB debut
- April 22, 1945, for the St. Louis Cardinals

Last MLB appearance
- September 25, 1945, for the St. Louis Cardinals

MLB statistics
- Win–loss record: 5–4
- Earned run average: 4.14
- Strikeouts: 34
- Stats at Baseball Reference

Teams
- St. Louis Cardinals (1945)

Jack Dalton Creel (April 23, 1916 – August 13, 2002), nicknamed "Tex", was an American Major League Baseball pitcher who played for the St. Louis Cardinals in 1945. The 29-year-old rookie right-hander was a native of Kyle, Texas.

Creel is one of many ballplayers who only appeared in the major leagues during World War II. He made his major league debut in relief on April 22, 1945, against the Cincinnati Reds in a doubleheader at Sportsman's Park. His first major league win came 23 days later, also in relief, in an 8–7 victory over the Boston Braves at Braves Field. He also won his first big league start, an 11–1 decision in a home game against the Brooklyn Dodgers.

Season and career totals for 26 games pitched include a 5–4 record, eight games started, two complete games, 10 games finished, two saves, and an ERA of 4.14 in 87 innings pitched.

Creel died at the age of 86 in Houston, Texas.

== Trivia ==
- Even though he pitched just 87 innings in 1945, Creel tied for sixth among National League hurlers with six hit batsmen. By contrast, it took the other two pitchers who were tied with him for sixth an average of 165.1 innings to hit the same number of batters.
- Creel was a cousin of former major league pitcher Tex Hughson.
