= Nick Picciuto =

American baseball player (1921-1997)

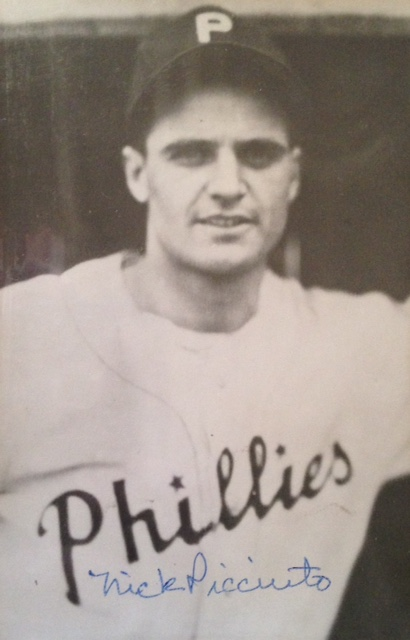
- Third baseman
- Born: August 27, 1921; Newark, New Jersey, U.S.
- Died: January 10, 1997 (aged 75); Winchester, Virginia, U.S.
- Batted: Right Threw: Right

MLB debut
- May 11, 1945, for the Philadelphia Phillies

Last MLB appearance
- September 30, 1945, for the Philadelphia Phillies

MLB statistics
- Batting average: .135
- Home runs: 0
- Runs batted in: 6
- Stats at Baseball Reference

Teams
- Philadelphia Phillies (1945)

Nicholas Thomas Picciuto (August 27, 1921 – January 10, 1997) was an American professional baseball player who appeared in 36 games, mainly as a third baseman, in Major League Baseball as a member of the 1945 Philadelphia Phillies. Born in Newark, New Jersey, he threw and batted right-handed and was listed as 5 feet 8 inches (1.73 m) tall and 175 pounds (79 kg).

Picciuto attended Michigan State University and began his pro baseball career in 1944 with the Utica Blue Sox, the Phillies' Eastern League farm club. The following season, the last year of MLB's World War II manpower shortage, he had two extended stays on the Philadelphia roster, from May 11, 1945, to June 10, and from September 12 to 30. He amassed 12 hits, including six doubles, in 89 at bats, batting .135 with six runs batted in. He returned to the minor leagues in 1946 and retired from baseball after the following season.

He died in Winchester, Virginia, aged 75, on January 10, 1997.
