= Shupe, Virginia =

- Unincorporated community
- Location within Virginia Location within the United States
- Coordinates: 36°59′00″N 81°9′41″W
- Country: United States
- State: Virginia
- County: Wythe
- Elevation: 2,441 ft (744 m)
- Time zone: UTC−5 (Eastern (EST))
  - Summer (DST): UTC−4 (EDT)
- GNIS feature ID: 1493592

Shupe is an unincorporated community in Wythe County, Virginia, United States.
