= Bob Whitcher =

American baseball player (1917–1997)

- Born: April 29, 1917; Berlin, New Hampshire, U.S.
- Died: May 8, 1997 (aged 80); Akron, Ohio, U.S.
- Batted: Left Threw: Left

MLB debut
- August 20, 1945, for the Boston Braves

Last MLB appearance
- September 18, 1945, for the Boston Braves

MLB statistics
- Win–loss record: 0–2
- Earned run average: 2.87
- Strikeouts: 6
- Stats at Baseball Reference

Teams
- Boston Braves (1945)

Robert Arthur Whitcher (April 29, 1917 – May 8, 1997) was an American Major League Baseball pitcher who appeared in nine games for the Boston Braves in 1945. The 5 ft 8 in (1.73 m), 165 lb (75 kg) left-hander was a native of Berlin, New Hampshire.

Whitcher is one of many ballplayers who only appeared in the major leagues during World War II. He made his major league debut in relief on August 20, 1945 against the St. Louis Cardinals at Braves Field. He started three games for Boston, and though he pitched effectively overall, the sixth-place Braves lost all three. The scores were 4–3 (10), 2–0, and 6–2.

Whitcher's season and career totals for 9 games are a 0–2 record, 3 starts, 0 complete games, and 3 games finished. Whitcher also appeared in three games as a pinch-runner. In 15 1/3 innings pitched he gave up 5 earned runs, giving him an ERA of 2.87.

Whitcher died at the age of 80 in Akron, Ohio.
