= Ed Walczak =

American baseball player (1915-1998)

- Second baseman
- Born: September 21, 1915; West Warwick, Rhode Island, U.S.
- Died: March 10, 1998 (aged 82); Norwich, Connecticut, U.S.
- Batted: Right Threw: Right

MLB debut
- September 3, 1945, for the Philadelphia Phillies

Last MLB appearance
- September 30, 1945, for the Philadelphia Phillies

MLB statistics
- Batting average: .211
- Hits: 12
- Runs batted in: 2
- Stats at Baseball Reference

Teams
- Philadelphia Phillies (1945)

Edwin Joseph "Husky" Walczak (September 21, 1915 – March 10, 1998) was an American Major League Baseball (MLB) player. Born in West Warwick, Rhode Island, he played with the Philadelphia Phillies in September of the 1945 season. He batted and threw right-handed.

After processing out of the Army Air Forces as a sergeant in August 1945, Walczak joined the Phillies and earned a starting role at second base in the final month of the season. September 1945 would be his only month as an MLB player; he spent the remainder of his professional baseball career (1946–50) in the minor leagues.

Walczak died on March 10, 1998, in Norwich, Connecticut, aged 82.
