= Izzy León =

Cuban baseball player (1911–2002)

- Pitcher
- Born: January 4, 1911; Cruces, Cuba
- Died: July 25, 2002 (aged 91); Miami, Florida, U.S.
- Batted: Right Threw: Right

MLB debut
- June 21, 1945, for the Philadelphia Phillies

Last MLB appearance
- September 16, 1945, for the Philadelphia Phillies

MLB statistics
- Win–loss record: 0–4
- Earned run average: 5.35
- Strikeouts: 11
- Stats at Baseball Reference

Teams
- Philadelphia Phillies (1945)

Izzy León
Medal record

Representing Cuba

Men's baseball

Baseball World Cup
Gold medal – first place	1942 Havana	Team
Gold medal – first place	1943 Havana	Team
Bronze medal – third place	1944 Caracas	Team

Isidoro León Becerra (January 4, 1911 – July 25, 2002) was a Cuban Major League Baseball pitcher who played for the Philadelphia Phillies in 1945. The 34-year-old rookie was a native of Cruces, Cuba.

León is one of many ballplayers who only appeared in the major leagues during World War II. He made his major league debut on June 21, 1945, in a home game against the Brooklyn Dodgers at Shibe Park. He was the starting and losing pitcher in a 9–2 defeat. Cy Buker was the winning pitcher. León's final big league appearance was on September 16. He was released by Philadelphia on February 26, 1946.

Season and career totals include 14 games pitched, 4 starts, 0 complete games, a 0–4 record with 4 games finished, 23 earned runs allowed in 38 2/3 innings, and an ERA of 5.35.

In 1948, he played for the New York Cubans of the Negro National League.

León died at the age of 91 in Miami, Florida.
