= Mitch Chetkovich =

American baseball player (1917-1971)

- Pitcher
- Born: July 21, 1917; Fairpoint, Ohio, U.S.
- Died: August 24, 1971 (aged 54); Grass Valley, California, U.S.
- Batted: Right Threw: Right

MLB debut
- April 19, 1945, for the Philadelphia Phillies

Last MLB appearance
- May 6, 1945, for the Philadelphia Phillies

MLB statistics
- Win–loss record: 0–0
- Earned run average: 0.00
- Strikeouts: 0
- Stats at Baseball Reference

Teams
- Philadelphia Phillies (1945)

Mitchell Chetkovich (July 21, 1917 – August 24, 1971) was an American Major League Baseball pitcher. Chetkovich played for the Philadelphia Phillies in 1945. In 4 career games, he had a 0–0 record, with no runs, in 3 innings. He batted and threw right-handed.

Chetkovich was born in Fairpoint, Ohio and died in Grass Valley, California.
