= Charlie Cozart =

American baseball player (1919–2004)

- Pitcher
- Born: October 17, 1919; Lenoir, North Carolina, U.S.
- Died: December 31, 2004 (aged 85); Lenoir, North Carolina, U.S.
- Batted: Right Threw: Left

MLB debut
- April 17, 1945, for the Boston Braves

Last MLB appearance
- June 14, 1945, for the Boston Braves

Career statistics
- Win–loss record: 1–0
- Earned run average: 10.13
- Strikeouts: 4
- Stats at Baseball Reference

Teams
- Boston Braves (1945)

Charles Rhubin Cozart (October 17, 1919 – December 31, 2004) was a Major League Baseball (MLB) pitcher who appeared in five games, all in relief, for the Boston Braves in 1945. The 25-year-old rookie left-hander, who stood 6 ft (1.83 m) tall and weighed 190 lb (86 kg), was a native of Caldwell County, North Carolina, and resided in Granite Falls, North Carolina.

Cozart is one of many ballplayers who only appeared in the major leagues during World War II. He made his major league debut on April 17, 1945 (Opening Day) against the New York Giants at Braves Field. Three days later he gained his first and only big league win in a 6–5 road victory over the Philadelphia Phillies at Shibe Park. His last appearance for the Braves was on June 14, 1945, and then he was traded to the New York Yankees organization almost two months later.

In a total of 8 innings pitched Cozart was 1–0 with 1 game finished. He was ineffective overall, allowing 25 baserunners (10 hits and 15 walks) for an extremely high WHIP of 3.125. The 9 earned runs he gave up saddled him with a final ERA of 10.13. He proved to be a good fielder during his short time at the major league level, recording 7 assists without committing an error.

Cozart eventually returned to his native Caldwell County and became a deputy sheriff there. In 1995, he was inducted into the Caldwell County Sports Hall of Fame.

He died on December 31, 2004, at the age of 85 in Lenoir, North Carolina.
