= Loren Bain =

American baseball player (1922-1996)

- Pitcher
- Born: July 4, 1922; Staples, Minnesota, U.S.
- Died: November 24, 1996 (aged 74); Chetek, Wisconsin, U.S.
- Batted: Right Threw: Right

MLB debut
- June 23, 1945, for the New York Giants

Last MLB appearance
- July 4, 1945, for the New York Giants

MLB statistics
- Win–loss record: 0–0
- Earned run average: 7.88
- Strikeouts: 1
- Stats at Baseball Reference

Teams
- New York Giants (1945)

Loren Bain (born Herbert Loren Bain) (July 4, 1922 – November 24, 1996) was an American Major League Baseball pitcher. He played with the New York Giants in 1945. He then worked as a bottler for Coca-Cola, retiring to Chetek, Wisconsin in 1968.
