= Don Hendrickson =

American baseball player (1913–1977)

- Pitcher
- Born: July 14, 1913; Kewanna, Indiana
- Died: January 19, 1977 (aged 63); Norfolk, Virginia
- Batted: Right Threw: Right

MLB debut
- July 4, 1945, for the Boston Braves

Last MLB appearance
- April 24, 1946, for the Boston Braves

MLB statistics
- Win–loss record: 4–9
- Earned run average: 4.90
- Strikeouts: 16
- Stats at Baseball Reference

Teams
- Boston Braves (1945–1946)

Donald William Hendrickson (July 14, 1913 – January 19, 1977) was an American professional baseball player and former Major League Baseball pitcher. He appeared in 39 games over parts of two seasons with the Boston Braves (1945–1946). He was born in Kewanna, Indiana, threw and batted right-handed, and was listed as 6 feet 2 inches (1.88 m) tall and 204 pounds (93 kg).

Hendrickson's pro career lasted for 11 consecutive years, beginning in the New York Yankees' organization in 1937. In the minor leagues, he won 21 games in 1938 for the Class B Norfolk Tars, and 16 games for the 1940 Kansas City Blues of the top-level American Association. In the midyear of 1945, the last year of the World War II manpower shortage, the Braves acquired Hendrickson from the Milwaukee Brewers, then an unaffiliated team in the American Association.

Ten days short of his 32nd birthday, Hendrickson made his MLB debut on July 4, 1945, a relief stint against the pennant-bound Chicago Cubs at Braves Field. Two days later, in Boston against the Pittsburgh Pirates, he started his first big-league game. The Braves manhandled Pirate left-hander Preacher Roe, scoring ten runs in the first two innings, giving Hendrickson a comfortable lead that stood at 14–3 by the ninth frame. He then withstood a five-run Pirate ninth, staying in the lopsided contest to preserve his complete game, 14–8 win. He helped himself at the plate with two singles and a run scored. Hendrickson would win three more games in 1945, but in his 37 games pitched he made only one more start, on July 14 against the Cubs at Wrigley Field. In it, he was bombed for five runs in only one-third of an inning, decisive tallies in what turned out to be a 6–5 Boston defeat. He spent the rest of his MLB career as a relief pitcher, and was credited with five saves, all during 1945.

Hendrickson worked in only two National League games in 1946 before Boston sent him back to the Kansas City Blues. All told, in 39 major-league games, he posted a 4–9 won–lost record and an earned run average of 4.90; hs allowed 78 hits and 41 bases on balls, with 16 strikeouts, in 751/3 career innings pitched.

He died in Norfolk, Virginia, where he once won 21 games, at the age of 63 in 1977.
