= Bill DeKoning =

American baseball player (1918-1979)

- Catcher
- Born: December 19, 1918; Brooklyn, New York
- Died: July 26, 1979 (aged 60); Palm Harbor, Florida
- Batted: Right Threw: Right

MLB debut
- May 27, 1945, for the New York Giants

Last MLB appearance
- June 8, 1945, for the New York Giants

MLB statistics
- Games played: 3
- At bats: 1
- Hits: 0
- Stats at Baseball Reference

Teams
- New York Giants (1945)

William Callahan DeKoning (December 19, 1918 – July 26, 1979) was a Major League Baseball catcher who played in three games for the New York Giants in 1945.
