= Bill Ramsey (baseball) =

American baseball player (1920-2008)

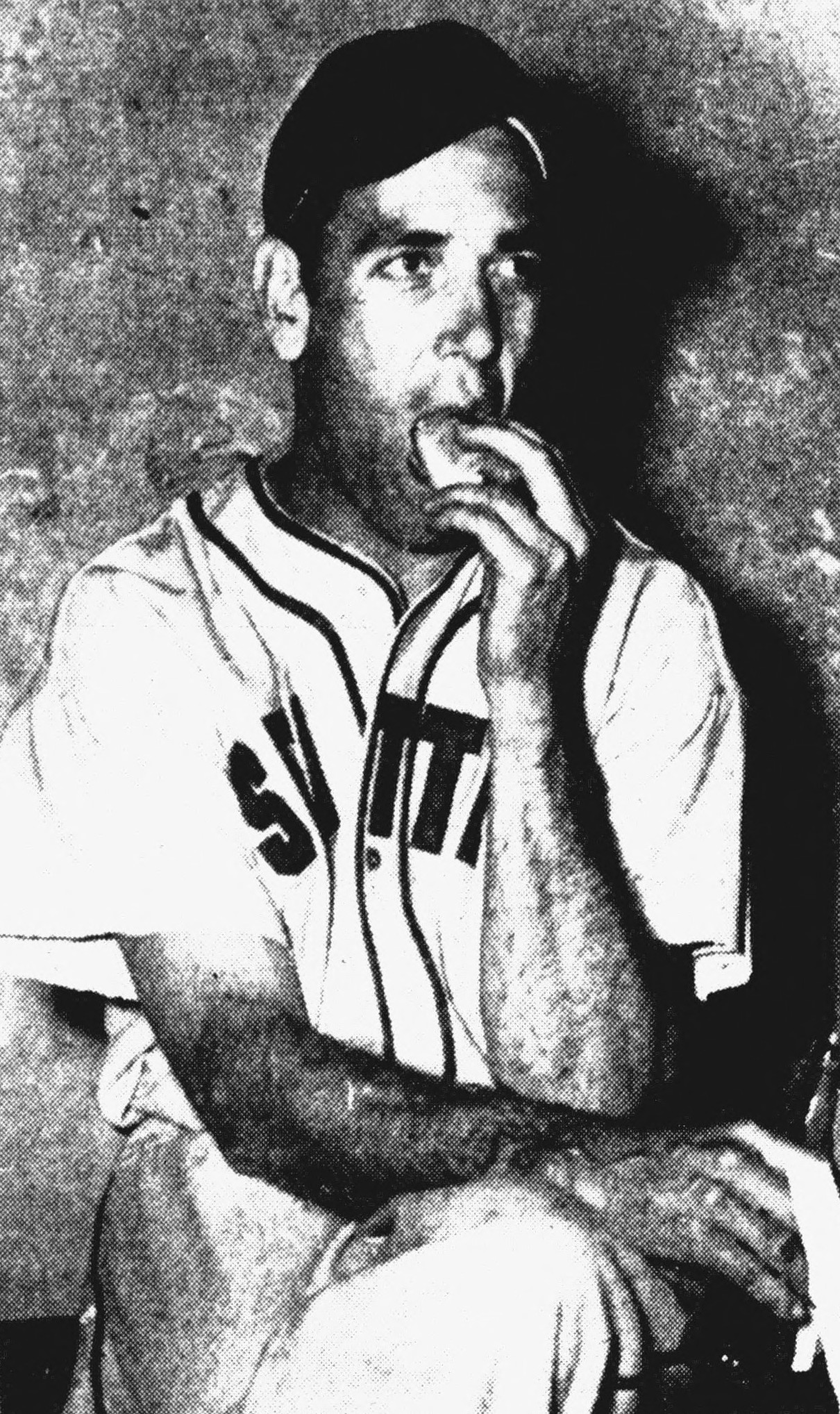
- Ramsey, circa 1948
- Outfielder
- Born: October 20, 1920; Osceola, Arkansas, U.S.
- Died: January 4, 2008 (aged 87); Memphis, Tennessee, U.S.
- Batted: Right Threw: Right

MLB debut
- April 19, 1945, for the Boston Braves

Last MLB appearance
- September 30, 1945, for the Boston Braves

MLB statistics
- Batting average: .292
- Home runs: 1
- Runs batted in: 12
- Stats at Baseball Reference

Teams
- Boston Braves (1945)

William Thrace "Square Jaw" Ramsey Jr. (October 20, 1920 – January 4, 2008) was an American professional baseball player who was an outfielder for the Boston Braves for a single Major League Baseball season in 1945.

Ramsey was born in Osceola, Arkansas. He attended the University of Florida, threw and batted right-handed, and was listed as 6 feet (1.8 m) tall and 175 pounds (79 kg).

On November 1, 1944, he had been drafted by the Boston Braves from the St. Louis Cardinals in the 1944 rule 5 draft. Ramsey was one of many ballplayers who only appeared in the major leagues during World War II. He made his major league debut on April 19, 1945, against the New York Giants at Braves Field. Besides his outfield duties he was often used as a pinch-hitter. In a total of 78 games he hit .292 (40-for-137) with 1 home run, 12 runs batted in, 16 runs scored, and a slugging percentage of .372.

He died at Kirby Pines Manor in Memphis, Tennessee, on January 4, 2008, and was buried at Elmwood Cemetery in Memphis.

== See also ==
- Florida Gators
- List of Florida Gators baseball players
