= Norm Wallen =

American baseball player (1918-1994)

- Third baseman
- Born: February 13, 1918; Milwaukee, Wisconsin, U.S.
- Died: June 20, 1994 (aged 76); Milwaukee, Wisconsin, U.S.
- Batted: Right Threw: Right

MLB debut
- April 20, 1945, for the Boston Braves

Last MLB appearance
- April 24, 1945, for the Boston Braves

MLB statistics
- Games: 4
- At bats: 15
- Hits: 2
- Stats at Baseball Reference

Teams
- Boston Braves (1945)

Norman Edward Wallen (born Norman Edward Walentowski; February 13, 1918 – June 20, 1994) was an American Major League Baseball player for the Boston Braves during the 1945 season.

Wallen was born in Milwaukee, Wisconsin and also died there. He batted and threw right-handed in his 4 games for Boston, having 2 hits in 15 at-bats, with a batting average of .133.

After only two weeks of play in the major leagues with the Braves, Wallen was hit in the knee by a line drive. The injury ended his career in baseball.

He was buried in Holy Cross Cemetery in Milwaukee, Wisconsin.
