= Jack Phillips (pitcher) =

American baseball player (1919-1958)

- Pitcher
- Born: May 24, 1919; St. Louis, Missouri, U.S.
- Died: June 16, 1958 (aged 39); St. Louis, Missouri, U.S.
- Batted: Right Threw: Right

MLB debut
- July 13, 1945, for the New York Giants

Last MLB appearance
- July 31, 1945, for the New York Giants

MLB statistics
- Win–loss record: 0–0
- Earned run average: 10.38
- Strikeouts: 0
- Innings pitched: 41/3
- Stats at Baseball Reference

Teams
- New York Giants (1945)

John Stephen Phillips (May 24, 1919 – June 16, 1958) was an American professional baseball player. A right-handed pitcher, he appeared on the mound in one game in Major League Baseball in 1945, working 41/3 innings in relief for the New York Giants and giving up five runs (all of them earned) on five hits and four bases on balls as the Giants were routed by the St. Louis Cardinals, 14–3. He also appeared in one other MLB game as a pinch runner on July 31 of that season against the Boston Braves, but failed to score a run.

Phillips was a native of St. Louis whose pro career lasted for seven seasons (1942–48). Listed as 6 feet 1 inch (1.85 m) tall and 185 pounds (84 kg), he had also spent part of 1945 as a member of the Giants' top farm club, Jersey City of the International League.

He died in St. Louis by accidental electrocution at the age of 39, ten years after leaving baseball.
