= Hal Schacker =

American baseball player (1925-2015)

- Pitcher
- Born: April 6, 1925; Brooklyn, New York, U.S.
- Died: October 2, 2015 (aged 90); Tampa, Florida, U.S.
- Batted: Right Threw: Right

MLB debut
- May 9, 1945, for the Boston Braves

Last MLB appearance
- June 14, 1945, for the Boston Braves

MLB statistics
- Win–loss record: 0–1
- Earned run average: 5.28
- Strikeouts: 6
- Stats at Baseball Reference

Teams
- Boston Braves (1945)

Harold Schacker (April 6, 1925 – October 2, 2015) was an American Major League Baseball pitcher who appeared in six games, all in relief, for the Boston Braves in 1945. At the age of 20, the 6 ft 0 in (1.83 m), 190 lb (86 kg) right-hander was the tenth-youngest player to appear in a National League game that season. He was born in Brooklyn, New York, and was Jewish.

Schacker is one of many ballplayers who only appeared in the major leagues during World War II. He made his major league debut on May 9, 1945 against the Pittsburgh Pirates at Braves Field, with his final appearance on June 14. In a total of 15 1/3 innings pitched he was 0–1 with 3 games finished, struck out 6, and walked 9. He gave up 12 runs (9 earned), giving him an ERA of 5.28.
