= James Mallory (coach) =

American baseball player and coach (1918–2001)

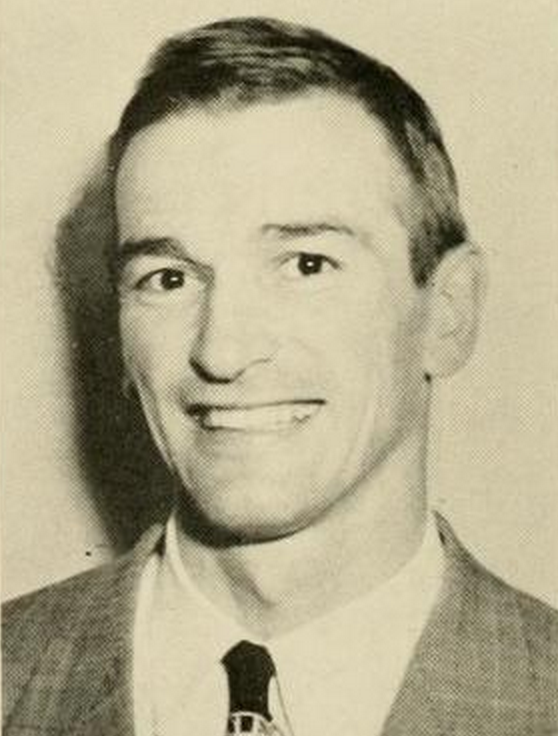
- Mallory pictured in Phi Psi Cli 1950, Elon yearbook

Biographical details
- Born: September 1, 1918; Lawrenceville, Virginia, U.S.
- Died: August 6, 2001 (aged 82); Greenville, North Carolina, U.S.

Playing career

Football
- 1938–1939: North Carolina

Coaching career (HC unless noted)

Football
- 1948–1952: Elon

Baseball
- 1948–1953: Elon
- 1954–1962: East Carolina
- 1973: East Carolina

Head coaching record
- Overall: 28–13–3 (football); 269–111 (baseball)

Accomplishments and honors

Championships
- Baseball; NAIA World Series (1961); 8 North State regular season (1949–1951, 1955–1956, 1959–1961)

James Mallory
- Outfielder
- Born: September 1, 1918; Lawrenceville, Virginia
- Died: August 6, 2001 (aged 82); Greenville, North Carolina
- Batted: Right Threw: Right

MLB debut
- September 8, 1940, for the Washington Senators

Last MLB appearance
- August 25, 1945, for the New York Giants

MLB statistics
- Batting average: .268
- Home runs: 0
- Runs batted in: 14
- Stats at Baseball Reference

Teams
- Washington Senators (1940); St. Louis Cardinals (1945); New York Giants (1945)

James Baugh "Sunny Jim" Mallory III (September 1, 1918 – August 6, 2001) was an American football coach, baseball coach and baseball player. As a Major League Baseball outfielder, he played parts of two seasons in the majors, debuting in 1940 for the Washington Senators, then returning in 1945, which he split between the St. Louis Cardinals and New York Giants. Mallory was the head football coach at Elon University from 1948 to 1952, compiling a record of 28–18–3. He attended the University of North Carolina. Mallory died in 2001.

== Head coaching record ==
=== Football ===
The following is a table of James Mallory's yearly records as a head football coach.

Year	Team	Overall	Conference	Standing	Bowl/playoffs
Elon Fightin' Christians (North State Conference) (1948–1952)
1948	Elon	4–5–1	3–4–1	6th	
1949	Elon	8–2	5–2	3rd	
1950	Elon	7–2–1	6–1–1	2nd	
1951	Elon	6–3	4–2	2nd	
1952	Elon	3–6–1	1–5	7th	
Elon:		28–18–3	19–14–2		
Total:		28–13–3 (.670)			

=== Baseball ===
The following is a table of James Mallory's yearly records as a head baseball coach.

Record table
Season	Team	Overall	Conference	Standing	Postseason
Elon Fightin' Christians (North State Conference) (1948–1953)
1948	Elon	17–8	10–3	2nd	
1949	Elon	20–5	13–2	1st	
1950	Elon	21–7	15–1	1st	
1951	Elon	16–9	13–2	1st	
1952	Elon	16–11	11–3	2nd	
1953	Elon	17–11	13–3	2nd	
Elon:		107–51 (.677)	75–14		
East Carolina Pirates (North State Conference) (1954–1962)
1954	East Carolina	15–7			
1955	East Carolina	20–5		1st	
1956	East Carolina	18–5		1st	
1957	East Carolina	16–7			
1958	East Carolina	10–6			
1959	East Carolina	16–3	14–0	1st	
1960	East Carolina	17–5		1st	
1961	East Carolina	23–4	13–1	1st	NAIA National Championship
1962	East Carolina	11–10	8–5		
East Carolina:		146–52			
East Carolina Pirates (Southern Conference) (1973)
1973	East Carolina	16–8	10–4	T-2nd	
East Carolina:		16–8	10–4		
East Carolina Total:		162–60 (.730)			
Total:		269–111 (.708)			
National champion Postseason invitational champion Conference regular season champion Conference regular season and conference tournament champion Division regular season champion Division regular season and conference tournament champion Conference tournament champion
