= Lefty Scott =

American baseball player (1915-1964)

- Pitcher
- Born: July 15, 1915; Roswell, New Mexico, U.S.
- Died: March 3, 1964 (aged 48); Houston, Texas, U.S.
- Batted: Right Threw: Left

MLB debut
- June 15, 1945, for the Philadelphia Phillies

Last MLB appearance
- July 12, 1945, for the Philadelphia Phillies

MLB statistics
- Win–loss record: 0–2
- Earned run average: 4.43
- Strikeouts: 5
- Stats at Baseball Reference

Teams
- Philadelphia Phillies (1945)

Marshall "Lefty" Scott (July 15, 1915 – March 3, 1964) was an American Major League Baseball pitcher who played for the Philadelphia Phillies in 1945. The 29-year-old rookie was a native of Roswell, New Mexico.

Scott is one of many ballplayers who only appeared in the major leagues during World War II. He made his major league debut on June 15, 1945 in a road game against the New York Giants at the Polo Grounds. His season and career totals include 8 games pitched, 2 starts, 0 complete games, a 0–2 record with 3 games finished, 11 earned runs allowed in 22 1/3 innings, and an ERA of 4.43.

Scott died from a fractured skull sustained in an industrial accident on March 3, 1964, at the age of 48 in Houston, Texas.
