= Slim Emmerich =

American baseball player

- Pitcher
- Born: September 29, 1919; Allentown, Pennsylvania, U.S.
- Died: September 17, 1998 (aged 78); Allentown, Pennsylvania, U.S.
- Batted: Right Threw: Right

MLB debut
- May 14, 1945, for the New York Giants

Last MLB appearance
- April 26, 1946, for the New York Giants

MLB statistics
- Win–loss record: 4–4
- Earned run average: 4.85
- Innings pitched: 104
- Strikeouts: 28
- Stats at Baseball Reference

Teams
- New York Giants (1945–1946)

William Peter "Slim" Emmerich (September 29, 1919 – September 17, 1998) was an American professional baseball player. The right-handed pitcher stood 6 feet 1 inch (1.85 m) tall and weighed 170 pounds (77 kg).

Emmerich made his Major League Baseball debut in 1945 with the New York Giants. He was drafted from the St. Louis Cardinals in the 1944 Rule 5 draft, and played during the 1945 (31 games pitched) and 1946 (two games) seasons. In 104 innings pitched in the Majors, he allowed 117 hits and 33 bases on balls, with 28 strikeouts. Seven of his 33 career appearances were as a starting pitcher, and he notched one complete game, a 5–1, seven-hit victory over the Philadelphia Phillies at Shibe Park.

Emmerich's pro career lasted 12 seasons, beginning in 1940 through 1951.
