= Joe Mack (first baseman) =

American baseball player (1912-1998)

- First baseman
- Born: Joseph Maciarz; January 4, 1912; Chicago, Illinois, U.S.
- Died: December 19, 1998 (aged 86); Atlanta, Georgia, U.S.
- Batted: Switch Threw: Left

MLB debut
- April 17, 1945, for the Boston Braves

Last MLB appearance
- July 4, 1945, for the Boston Braves

MLB statistics
- Batting average: .231
- Home runs: 3
- Runs batted in: 44
- Stats at Baseball Reference

Teams
- Boston Braves (1945)

Joseph John Mack (né Maciarz, January 4, 1912 – December 19, 1998) was an American Major League Baseball first baseman who played for the Boston Braves in 1945. The 33-year-old rookie was a native of Chicago.

Mack is one of many ballplayers who only appeared in the major leagues during World War II. He made his major league debut on April 17, 1945 (Opening Day) against the New York Giants at Braves Field. He was Boston's regular first baseman until the July 4, when he played in his last big league game.

Season and career totals include 66 games played, a .231 batting average (60-for-260), 3 home runs, 44 runs batted in, and 30 runs scored. He made 6 errors in 65 games at first base and had a fielding percentage of .991.
