= Glenn Crawford =

American baseball player (1913–1972)

- Outfielder / Shortstop
- Born: December 2, 1913; North Branch, Michigan, U.S.
- Died: January 2, 1972 (aged 58); Saginaw, Michigan, U.S.
- Batted: Left Threw: Right

MLB debut
- April 22, 1945, for the St. Louis Cardinals

Last MLB appearance
- April 22, 1946, for the Philadelphia Phillies

MLB statistics
- Batting average: .291
- Home runs: 2
- Runs batted in: 24
- Stats at Baseball Reference

Teams
- St. Louis Cardinals (1945); Philadelphia Phillies (1945–46)

Glenn Martin Crawford (December 2, 1913 – January 2, 1972) was an American Major League Baseball player. He played in 1945 and one game in 1946 in the majors for the St. Louis Cardinals and Philadelphia Phillies. Crawford played at least seven games at four different positions: 34 at shortstop, 32 in right field, 14 at second base, and 7 in left field.
