= John Antonelli (infielder) =

American baseball player (1915–1990)

- Third baseman / Second baseman
- Born: July 15, 1915; Memphis, Tennessee, U.S.
- Died: April 18, 1990 (aged 74); Memphis, Tennessee, U.S.
- Batted: Right Threw: Right

MLB debut
- September 16, 1944, for the St. Louis Cardinals

Last MLB appearance
- September 17, 1945, for the Philadelphia Phillies

MLB statistics
- Batting average: .252
- Hits: 133
- Runs batted in: 29
- Stats at Baseball Reference

Teams
- St. Louis Cardinals (1944–1945); Philadelphia Phillies (1945)

John Lawrence Antonelli (July 15, 1915 – April 18, 1990) was an American third baseman in Major League Baseball in 1944–45 and a longtime coach and manager at the minor league level. The native of Memphis, Tennessee, batted and threw right-handed, stood 5 feet 11 inches (1.80 m) tall and weighed 165 pounds (75 kg).

== A manager at age 19 ==
Antonelli was one of the youngest and least-experienced managers in minor league baseball annals. In 1935, he signed his first professional contract with his hometown Memphis Chicks of the Southern Association, played in three games, batted 11 times, and garnered two hits for a .182 batting average. He was then assigned, at age 19, to be the playing manager of the Lexington Giants of the Class D KITTY League, where he batted .326 and led the Giants to a 42–44 won/loss mark. Antonelli remained a playing skipper in the KITTY League through 1937, where in his final season he managed the Union City Greyhounds, a farm club of the St. Louis Cardinals, to a first-place finish.

After 1937, he suspended his managing career and was purely a second baseman and third baseman with the Cardinals' Houston Buffaloes and Columbus Red Birds farm clubs for almost seven full seasons. Antonelli batted over .300 only once, but led his leagues in fielding percentage as both a second- and third baseman.

== MLB service with Cardinals and Phillies ==
On September 16, 1944, at age 29, Antonelli was recalled by the Cardinals and played his first National League game. He appeared in eight games for the 1944 Cardinals and two more in the beginning of 1945 before St. Louis swapped him to the Philadelphia Phillies on May 8. Antonelli played 125 games for the 1945 Phils and batted .256. With the end of the World War II manpower shortage, Antonelli's major league playing career ended. In 135 games and 528 at bats, he batted .252 with one home run and 29 runs batted in.

== Manager in Mets' organization ==
Antonelli's minor league playing career ended in 1950 as a playing manager, when he led the Hot Springs Bathers to the championship of the Class C Cotton States League. He briefly scouted for the Chicago White Sox in the years following, but largely spent the period of 1951–67 out of professional baseball. In 1968, the New York Mets established a Double-A Texas League farm team, the Memphis Blues, in Antonelli's hometown and Antonelli returned to uniform as a coach. In 1969, Antonelli succeeded Pete Pavlick as Memphis manager' and held the post until Roy McMillan arrived from Class-A Visalia to take over the helm. Then, in 1970, Antonelli was named the permanent pilot of the Blues, and he continued as a manager in the Mets' farm system through 1976 with Memphis (1970–72), the Triple-A Tidewater Tides (1973–74), and the Double-A Jackson Mets (1975–76). His career record as a minor league manager was 745–688 (.520).

Antonelli then served as a roving minor league infield instructor in the Mets' system, through 1985. He died in 1990 in Memphis at the age of 74 and is buried at Calvary Cemetery.

== See also ==
- Van Lingle Mungo (song)
