= 1944 Philadelphia Phillies season =

Major League Baseball season

1944 Philadelphia Phillies
- Also known as the Philadelphia Blue Jays
- League: National League
- Ballpark: Shibe Park
- City: Philadelphia, Pennsylvania
- Owners: R. R. M. Carpenter
- General managers: Herb Pennock
- Managers: Freddie Fitzsimmons
- Radio: WIBG (By Saam, Claude Haring, Doug Arthur)

The 1944 Philadelphia Phillies season was the 62nd season in the history of the franchise.

== Offseason ==
Bill Veeck attempted to purchase the Phillies in late 1943. Veeck's plan was to sign players from the Negro leagues to make the Phillies competitive.

The organization held a fan contest prior to the 1944 season to solicit a second nickname for the Phillies. Fans voted on Blue Jays and Elizabeth Crooks designed a logo of a blue jay perched on the Phillies word mark.

== Regular season ==
The Phillies got off to a 12–6 start, and on May 13 were 1.5 games out of first place. However, it was all downhill from there, as they finished with yet another losing season.

=== Season standings ===
National League
Team	W	L	Pct.	GB	Home	Road
St. Louis Cardinals	105	49	.682	—	54‍–‍22	51‍–‍27
Pittsburgh Pirates	90	63	.588	14½	49‍–‍28	41‍–‍35
Cincinnati Reds	89	65	.578	16	45‍–‍33	44‍–‍32
Chicago Cubs	75	79	.487	30	35‍–‍42	40‍–‍37
New York Giants	67	87	.435	38	39‍–‍36	28‍–‍51
Boston Braves	65	89	.422	40	38‍–‍40	27‍–‍49
Brooklyn Dodgers	63	91	.409	42	37‍–‍39	26‍–‍52
Philadelphia Phillies	61	92	.399	43½	29‍–‍49	32‍–‍43

=== Record vs. opponents ===
1944 National League record Sources:
Team	BSN	BRO	CHC	CIN	NYG	PHI	PIT	STL
Boston	—	9–13	11–11	8–14	9–13	11–11–1	9–13	8–14
Brooklyn	13–9	—	8–14–1	8–14	10–12	16–6	4–18	4–18
Chicago	11–11	14–8–1	—	9–13–1	10–12	13–9	12–10–1	6–16
Cincinnati	14–8	14–8	13–9–1	—	15–7	13–19	12–10	8–14
New York	13–9	12–10	12–10	7–15	—	10–12	7–15–1	6–16
Philadelphia	11–11–1	6–16	9–13	9–13	12–10	—	9–12	5–17
Pittsburgh	13–9	18–4	10–12–1	10–12	15–7–1	12–9	—	12–10–3
St. Louis	14–8	18–4	16–6	14–8	16–6	17–5	10–12–3	—

=== Game log ===
Legend
	Phillies win
	Phillies loss
	Phillies tie
	Postponement
**Bold**	Phillies team member

1944 Game Log
Overall Record: 61–92–1
April (6–4–1)

#	Date	Opponent	Score	Win	Loss	Save	Attendance	Record
1	April 18	Dodgers	4–1	**Dick Barrett** (1–0)	Hal Gregg (0–1)	None	11,910	1–0
2	April 19	Dodgers	4–5 (10)	Bob Chipman (1–0)	**Deacon Donahue** (0–1)	None	2,578	1–1
3	April 20	Dodgers	2–8	Fritz Ostermueller (1–0)	**Charley Schanz** (0–1)	None	3,058	1–2
–	April 21	@ Braves	Postponed (rain); Makeup: April 23 as a traditional double-header					
4	April 22	@ Braves	3–2	**Ken Raffensberger** (1–0)	Al Javery (0–2)	None	3,384	2–2
5	April 23 (1)	@ Braves	0–5	Jim Tobin (1–1)	**Dick Barrett** (1–1)	None	see 2nd game	2–3
6	April 23 (2)	@ Braves	3–0	**Al Gerheauser** (1–0)	Nate Andrews (0–1)	None	13,806	3–3
7	April 25	Giants	4–3 (12)	**Charley Schanz** (1–1)	Harry Feldman (0–1)	None	3,045	4–3
–	April 27	Giants	Postponed (rain); Makeup: July 14					
8	April 28	Braves	1–2 (11)	Nate Andrews (1–1)	**Dick Barrett** (1–2)	None	3,026	4–4
9	April 29	Braves	6–3	**Ken Raffensberger** (2–0)	Red Barrett (0–3)	None	5,581	5–4
10	April 30 (1)	Braves	2–1 (14)	**Chet Covington** (1–0)	Al Javery (0–3)	None	see 2nd game	6–4
11	April 30 (2)	Braves	2–2^{^{[a]}}	None	None	None	30,392	6–4–1

May (11–15)

#	Date	Opponent	Score	Win	Loss	Save	Attendance	Record
12	May 2	@ Giants	5–2	**Charley Schanz** (2–1)	Bill Voiselle (3–1)	None	2,268	7–4–1
13	May 3	@ Giants	7–1	**Bill Lee** (1–0)	Ace Adams (1–2)	None	4,145	8–4–1
14	May 5	@ Dodgers	3–1	**Ken Raffensberger** (3–0)	Curt Davis (2–1)	None	7,801	9–4–1
15	May 6	@ Dodgers	1–10	Hal Gregg (3–2)	**Dick Barrett** (1–3)	None	9,119	9–5–1
–	May 7 (1)	@ Dodgers	Postponed (rain); Makeup: June 7					
–	May 7 (2)	@ Dodgers	Postponed (rain); Makeup: August 30					
16	May 10	@ Cubs	7–1	**Al Gerheauser** (2–0)	Bill Fleming (0–3)	None	3,256	10–5–1
17	May 11	@ Cubs	3–5	Ed Hanyzewski (1–3)	**Dick Barrett** (1–4)	None	3,878	10–6–1
18	May 12	@ Cubss	9–3	**Charley Schanz** (3–1)	Paul Derringer (0–5)	None	3,738	11–6–1
19	May 13	@ Cubs	6–2	**Bill Lee** (2–0)	Hank Wyse (1–4)	None	3,469	12–6–1
20	May 14 (1)	@ Cardinals	3–6	Mort Cooper (2–2)	**Ken Raffensberger** (3–1)	None	see 2nd game	12–7–1
21	May 14 (2)	@ Cardinals	0–1	Red Munger (3–1)	**Al Gerheauser** (2–1)	None	12,170	12–8–1
22	May 15	@ Cardinals	6–11	Harry Gumbert (2–1)	**Dick Barrett** (1–5)	Freddy Schmidt (1)	1,173	12–9–1
23	May 16	@ Cardinals	6–5^{^{[b]}}	**Charley Schanz** (4–1)	Max Lanier (5–1)	None	10,159	13–9–1
24	May 17	@ Reds	5–6 (8)	Bob Malloy (1–0)	**Deacon Donahue** (0–2)	None	1,212	13–10–1
25	May 18	@ Reds	2–0	**Ken Raffensberger** (4–1)	Bucky Walters (5–2)	None	10,253	14–10–1
26	May 19	@ Reds	5–7	Clyde Shoun (3–1)	**Dick Barrett** (1–6)	None	1,450	14–11–1
27	May 20	@ Pirates	3–4	Nick Strincevich (4–0)	**Al Gerheauser** (2–2)	None	4,096	14–12–1
28	May 21 (1)	@ Pirates	3–4	Max Butcher (3–2)	**Charley Schanz** (4–2)	None	see 2nd game	14–13–1
29	May 21 (2)	@ Pirates	9–4^{^{[c]}}	**Dick Barrett** (2–6)	Xavier Rescigno (1–4)	None	23,009	15–13–1
30	May 24	Cubs	0–2	Paul Erickson (1–0)	**Ken Raffensberger** (4–2)	None	9,945	15–14–1
–	May 25	Cubs	Postponed (rain); Makeup: August 1 as a traditional double-header					
31	May 26	Cubs	1–9	Paul Derringer (2–5)	**Al Gerheauser** (2–3)	None	2,763	15–15–1
–	May 27	Pirates	Postponed (rain); Makeup: July 20 as a traditional double-header					
32	May 28 (1)	Pirates	0–4	Rip Sewell (6–2)	**Charley Schanz** (4–3)	None	see 2nd game	15–16–1
33	May 28 (2)	Pirates	8–2	**Dick Barrett** (3–6)	Nick Strincevich (4–2)	None	22,773	16–16–1
34	May 29	Pirates	2–3 (11)	Xavier Rescigno (3–4)	**Ken Raffensberger** (4–3)	None	14,438	16–17–1
35	May 30 (1)	Reds	3–4	Arnold Carter (1–0)	**Bill Lee** (2–1)	Ed Heusser (1)	see 2nd game	16–18–1
36	May 30 (2)	Reds	4–7	Clyde Shoun (4–1)	**Al Gerheauser** (2–4)	None	21,556	16–19–1
37	May 31	Reds	5–4	**Charley Schanz** (5–3)	Bob Ferguson (0–3)	None	2,983	17–19–1

June (9–17)

#	Date	Opponent	Score	Win	Loss	Save	Attendance	Record
38	June 1	Reds	8–7	**Dick Barrett** (4–6)	Tommy de la Cruz (2–4)	**Bill Lee** (1)	4,306	18–19–1
39	June 2	Cardinals	3–9	Mort Cooper (4–3)	**Ken Raffensberger** (4–4)	None	20,339	18–20–1
40	June 3	Cardinals	3–5	Al Jurisich (3–4)	**Al Gerheauser** (2–5)	None	5,840	18–21–1
41	June 4 (1)	Cardinals	2–4	Harry Gumbert (3–2)	**Charley Schanz** (5–4)	Red Munger (1)	see 2nd game	18–22–1
42	June 4 (2)	Cardinals	1–0	**Bill Lee** (3–1)	Freddy Schmidt (0–1)	None	23,313	19–22–1
–	June 6	@ Dodgers	Postponed (D-Day); Makeup: June 8 as a traditional double-header					
43	June 7	@ Dodgers	6–5	**Ken Raffensberger** (5–4)	Rube Melton (2–4)	**Charley Schanz** (1)	4,434	20–22–1
44	June 8 (1)	@ Dodgers	3–6	Les Webber (2–3)	**Dick Barrett** (4–7)	None	see 2nd game	20–23–1
45	June 8 (2)	@ Dodgers	1–8	Ed Head (1–0)	**Al Gerheauser** (2–6)	None	1,123	20–24–1
–	June 10	@ Giants	Postponed (weather, rain); Makeup: September 12 as a traditional double-header					
46	June 11 (1)	@ Giants	5–6	Bill Voiselle (7–7)	**Ken Raffensberger** (5–5)	None	see 2nd game	20–25–1
47	June 11 (2)	@ Giants	5–6 (12)	Ace Adams (6–6)	**Dick Barrett** (4–8)	None	21,526	20–26–1
48	June 13 (1)^{^{[d]}}	Braves	1–2	Jim Tobin (7–5)	**Ken Raffensberger** (5–6)	None	see 2nd game	20–27–1
49	June 13 (2)^{^{[d]}}	Braves	8–7	**Al Gerheauser** (3–6)	Nate Andrews (5–5)	None	5,382	21–27–1
–	June 14	Braves	Postponed (rain); Makeup: September 1 as a traditional double-header					
50	June 15	Braves	5–4	**Ken Raffensberger** (6–6)	Jim Tobin (7–6)	None	4,568	22–27–1
51	June 16	Dodgers	4–5	Rube Melton (4–4)	**Charley Schanz** (5–5)	Les Webber (1)	9,055	22–28–1
52	June 17	Dodgers	3–4	Whit Wyatt (1–3)	**Bill Lee** (3–2)	Hal Gregg (2)	4,858	22–29–1
53	June 18 (1)	Dodgers	3–7	Ed Head (3–0)	**Ken Raffensberger** (6–7)	None	see 2nd game	22–30–1
54	June 18 (2)	Dodgers	6–2	**Al Gerheauser** (4–6)	Cal McLish (2–5)	None	17,243	23–30–1
–	June 20	@ Braves	Postponed (rain); Makeup: August 25 as a traditional double-header					
–	June 21 (1)^{^{[e]}}	@ Braves	Postponed (rain); Makeup: June 22 as a traditional double-header					
–	June 21 (2)	@ Braves	Postponed (rain); Makeup: August 26 as a traditional double-header					
55	June 22 (1)^{^{[e]}}	@ Braves	1–0 (15)	**Charley Schanz** (6–5)	Al Javery (3–9)	None	see 2nd game	24–30–1
56	June 22 (2)	@ Braves	0–7 (5)	Jim Tobin (8–7)	**Dick Barrett** (4–9)	None	2,556	24–31–1
57	June 23	@ Dodgers	0–2	Ed Head (4–0)	**Ken Raffensberger** (6–8)	None	13,510	24–32–1
58	June 24	@ Dodgers	3–8	Cal McLish (3–5)	**Al Gerheauser** (4–7)	None	10,431	24–33–1
59	June 25 (1)	@ Dodgers	1–4	Curt Davis (4–4)	**Charley Schanz** (6–6)	None	see 2nd game	24–34–1
60	June 25 (2)	@ Dodgers	1–2 (10)	Rube Melton (5–5)	**Dick Barrett** (4–10)	None	13,320	24–35–1
61	June 28	@ Cardinals	4–0	**Ken Raffensberger** (7–8)	Max Lanier (7–5)	None	24,782	25–35–1
62	June 29	@ Cardinals	1–0 (10)	**Bill Lee** (4–2)	Red Munger (10–2)	None	1,449	26–35–1
63	June 30	@ Cardinals	4–8	Mort Cooper (8–3)	**Al Gerheauser** (4–8)	Blix Donnelly (1)	1,162	26–36–1

July (11–20)

#	Date	Opponent	Score	Win	Loss	Save	Attendance	Record
64	July 1	@ Cubs	4–2	**Dick Barrett** (5–10)	Paul Erickson (2–4)	None	5,738	27–36–1
65	July 2 (1)	@ Cubs	1–8	Bob Chipman (6–3)	**Charley Schanz** (6–7)	None	see 2nd game	27–37–1
66	July 2 (2)	@ Cubs	4–2	**Ken Raffensberger** (8–8)	Hank Wyse (6–8)	None	29,307	28–37–1
67	July 4 (1)	@ Pirates	3–2	**Al Gerheauser** (5–8)	Rip Sewell (10–6)	**Charley Schanz** (2)	see 2nd game	29–37–1
68	July 4 (2)	@ Pirates	0–4	Max Butcher (6–5)	**Bill Lee** (4–3)	None	16,285	29–38–1
69	July 5	@ Pirates	12–2	**Dick Barrett** (6–10)	Ray Starr (3–1)	None	2,055	30–38–1
70	July 6	@ Pirates	5–6	Nick Strincevich (6–4)	**Ken Raffensberger** (8–9)	Xavier Rescigno (4)	9,136	30–39–1
71	July 7	@ Reds	3–2	**Charley Schanz** (7–7)	Clyde Shoun (6–5)	None	877	31–39–1
72	July 8	@ Reds	3–2	**Bill Lee** (5–3)	Jim Konstanty (3–1)	**Andy Karl** (1)	1,626	32–39–1
73	July 9 (1)	@ Reds	5–9	Arnold Carter (5–2)	**Dick Barrett** (6–11)	Bucky Walters (1)	see 2nd game	32–40–1
74	July 9 (2)	@ Reds	5–7	Ed Heusser (6–5)	**Ken Raffensberger** (8–10)	None	10,111	32–41–1
–	July 11	**1944 Major League Baseball All-Star Game at Forbes Field in Pittsburgh**						
–	July 13	Giants	Postponed (rain); Makeup: July 15 as a traditional double-header					
75	July 14	Giants	1–2	Harry Feldman (1–2)	**Ken Raffensberger** (8–11)	Ace Adams (9)	11,137	32–42–1
76	July 15 (1)	Giants	3–1	**Bill Lee** (6–3)	Bill Voiselle (11–11)	None	see 2nd game	33–42–1
77	July 15 (2)	Giants	1–6	Jack Brewer (1–0)	**Charley Schanz** (7–8)	None	7,835	33–43–1
78	July 16 (1)	Giants	6–2	**Al Gerheauser** (6–8)	Johnny Allen (1–1)	None	see 2nd game	34–43–1
79	July 16 (2)	Giants	3–8^{^{[f]}}	Andy Hansen (1–2)	**Dick Barrett** (6–12)	Ace Adams (10)	16,266	34–44–1
80	July 19	Pirates	4–2	**Ken Raffensberger** (9–11)	Nick Strincevich (6–5)	None	7,784	35–44–1
81	July 20 (1)	Pirates	1–4	Ray Starr (4–2)	**Bill Lee** (6–4)	None	see 2nd game	35–45–1
82	July 20 (2)	Pirates	3–2 (11)	**Charley Schanz** (8–8)	Xavier Rescigno (5–7)	None	7,309	36–45–1
83	July 21	Pirates	3–5	Max Butcher (8–5)	**Al Gerheauser** (6–9)	None	8,527	36–46–1
84	July 22	Reds	3–4	Tommy de la Cruz (3–7)	**Andy Karl** (0–1)	None	8,498	36–47–1
85	July 23 (1)	Reds	7–6	**Charley Schanz** (9–8)	Harry Gumbert (7–6)	None	see 2nd game	37–47–1
86	July 23 (2)	Reds	1–2	Clyde Shoun (7–5)	**Ken Raffensberger** (9–12)	None	16,895	37–48–1
–	July 24	Reds	Postponed (rain); Makeup: September 19 as a traditional double-header					
87	July 25	Cardinals	0–9	Al Jurisich (7–6)	**Al Gerheauser** (6–10)	None	8,945	37–49–1
88	July 26	Cardinals	6–8 (10)	Max Lanier (10–5)	**Barney Mussill** (0–1)	None	14,863	37–50–1
89	July 27 (1)	Cardinals	7–8	Harry Brecheen (9–2)	**Bill Lee** (6–5)	Al Jurisich (1)	see 2nd game	37–51–1
90	July 27 (2)^{^{[g]}}	Cardinals	0–5	Mort Cooper (13–4)	**Ken Raffensberger** (9–13)	None	12,871	37–52–1
91	July 29	Cubs	2–4	Claude Passeau (6–7)	**Dick Barrett** (6–13)	None	6,560	37–53–1
92	July 30 (1)	Cubs	2–4	Hank Wyse (10–9)	**Charley Schanz** (9–9)	Bob Chipman (1)	see 2nd game	37–54–1
93	July 30 (2)	Cubs	2–11	Bill Fleming (7–7)	**Al Gerheauser** (6–11)	None	12,712	37–55–1
94	July 31	Cubs	1–5	Hy Vandenberg (4–3)	**Bill Lee** (6–6)	None	4,134	37–56–1

August (11–17)

#	Date	Opponent	Score	Win	Loss	Save	Attendance	Record
–	August 1 (1)	Cubs	Postponed (transportation strike); Makeup: August 2 as a traditional double-header					
–	August 1 (2)	Cubs	Postponed (transportation strike); Makeup: August 2 as a traditional double-header					
–	August 2 (1)	Cubs	Postponed (transportation strike); Makeup: September 25 as a traditional double-header					
–	August 2 (2)	Cubs	Postponed (transportation strike); Makeup: September 26 as a traditional double-header					
95	August 4	@ Giants	3–4 (10)^{^{[h]}}	Andy Hansen (3–2)	**Ken Raffensberger** (9–14)	None	11,603	37–57–1
96	August 5	@ Giants	5–6	Rube Fischer (4–8)	**Vern Kennedy** (2–6)	Ace Adams (12)	10,376	37–58–1
97	August 6 (1)	@ Giants	2–6	Harry Feldman (9–7)	**Charley Schanz** (9–10)	Andy Hansen (1)	see 2nd game	37–59–1
98	August 6 (2)	@ Giants	3–1	**Bill Lee** (7–6)	Johnny Allen (2–3)	None	15,299	38–59–1
99	August 9	@ Cardinals	2–4	Max Lanier (14–5)	**Ken Raffensberger** (9–15)	None	11,547	38–60–1
100	August 10	@ Cardinals	0–2	Mort Cooper (15–5)	**Al Gerheauser** (6–12)	None	5,039	38–61–1
101	August 11	@ Cardinals	4–9	Freddy Schmidt (3–1)	**Charley Schanz** (9–11)	None	5,985	38–62–1
102	August 12	@ Cardinals	3–0	**Dick Barrett** (7–13)	Al Jurisich (7–9)	None	5,693	39–62–1
103	August 13 (1)	@ Cubs	3–2	**Bill Lee** (8–6)	Bob Chipman (11–7)	**Andy Karl** (2)	see 2nd game	40–62–1
104	August 13 (2)	@ Cubs	7–6	**Charley Schanz** (10–11)	Paul Erickson (2–7)	None	38,567	41–62–1
105	August 14	@ Cubs	6–1	**Ken Raffensberger** (10–15)	Bill Fleming (8–8)	None	3,508	42–62–1
106	August 15	@ Cubs	1–4 (6)	Hy Vandenberg (5–3)	**Al Gerheauser** (6–13)	None	4,605	42–63–1
–	August 16	@ Pirates	Postponed (rain and wet grounds); Makeup: August 17 as a traditional double-header					
107	August 17 (1)	@ Pirates	6–7	Xavier Rescigno (8–7)	**Andy Karl** (0–2)	None	see 2nd game	42–64–1
108	August 17 (2)	@ Pirates	5–6 (10)	Nick Strincevich (9–6)	**Dick Barrett** (7–14)	None	3,262	42–65–1
109	August 18	@ Pirates	3–2	**Ken Raffensberger** (11–15)	Rip Sewell (13–10)	None	14,566	43–65–1
110	August 19	@ Pirates	3–5	Preacher Roe (10–9)	**Al Gerheauser** (6–14)	None	3,327	43–66–1
111	August 20 (1)	@ Reds	1–2 (12)	Bucky Walters (18–6)	**Vern Kennedy** (2–7)	None	see 2nd game	43–67–1
112	August 20 (2)	@ Reds	4–1	**Charley Schanz** (11–11)	Arnold Carter (7–6)	None	10,595	44–67–1
113	August 22 (1)	@ Reds	4–3	**Bill Lee** (9–6)	Clyde Shoun (9–7)	None	see 2nd game	45–67–1
114	August 22 (2)	@ Reds	1–5	Tommy de la Cruz (6–7)	**Dick Barrett** (7–15)	None	9,262	45–68–1
115	August 25 (1)	@ Braves	9–7	**Dick Barrett** (8–15)	Jim Tobin (13–16)	None	see 2nd game	46–68–1
116	August 25 (2)	@ Braves	3–4	Nate Andrews (13–11)	**Charley Schanz** (11–12)	None	2,483	46–69–1
117	August 26 (1)	@ Braves	3–0	**Al Gerheauser** (7–14)	Jim Tobin (13–17)	None	see 2nd game	47–69–1
118	August 26 (2)	@ Braves	2–3	Johnny Hutchings (1–2)	**Vern Kennedy** (2–8)	None	3,076	47–70–1
119	August 27 (1)	@ Braves	8–5	**Dick Barrett** (9–15)	Al Javery (5–17)	**Charley Schanz** (3)	see 2nd game	48–70–1
120	August 27 (2)	@ Braves	4–5 (10)	Al Javery (6–17)	**Bill Lee** (9–7)	None	7,578	48–71–1
121	August 29	@ Dodgers	1–2	Hal Gregg (8–14)	**Charley Schanz** (11–13)	None	1,974	48–72–1
122	August 30	@ Dodgers	2–10	Ben Chapman (2–1)	**Ken Raffensberger** (11–16)	None	11,537	48–73–1

September (12–18)

#	Date	Opponent	Score	Win	Loss	Save	Attendance	Record
123	September 1 (1)	Braves	2–3 (10)	Ira Hutchinson (8–6)	**Al Gerheauser** (7–15)	None	see 2nd game	48–74–1
124	September 1 (2)	Braves	4–7	Al Javery (7–17)	**Vern Kennedy** (2–9)	Nate Andrews (2)	4,191	48–75–1
125	September 2	Braves	1–2 (13)	Ira Hutchinson (9–6)	**Bill Lee** (9–8)	None	3,905	48–76–1
126	September 3 (1)	Braves	1–2	Jim Tobin (15–17)	**Dick Barrett** (9–16)	None	see 2nd game	48–77–1
127	September 3 (2)	Braves	5–0	**Charley Schanz** (12–13)	Ben Cardoni (0–6)	None	10,737	49–77–1
128	September 4 (1)	Giants	0–7	Harry Feldman (11–10)	**Ken Raffensberger** (11–17)	None	see 2nd game	49–78–1
129	September 4 (2)	Giants	14–8	**Andy Karl** (1–2)	Rube Fischer (4–13)	None	12,651	50–78–1
130	September 7	Dodgers	7–5	**Andy Karl** (2–2)	Art Herring (2–3)	None	3,566	51–78–1
131	September 8^{^{[i]}}	Dodgers	3–4	Les Webber (6–8)	**Ken Raffensberger** (11–18)	None	3,261	51–79–1
132	September 10 (1)	Dodgers	4–8	Tom Sunkel (1–3)	**Bill Lee** (9–9)	Les Webber (3)	see 2nd game	51–80–1
133	September 10 (2)	Dodgers	3–2	**Dick Barrett** (10–16)	Ben Chapman (3–2)	None	10,500	52–80–1
–	September 12 (1)	@ Giants	Postponed (rain); Makeup: September 13 as a traditional double-header					
–	September 12 (2)	@ Giants	Postponed (rain); Makeup: September 16 in Philadelphia as a traditional double-header					
–	September 13 (1)	@ Giants	Postponed (rain); Makeup: September 14 as a traditional double-header					
–	September 13 (2)	@ Giants	Postponed (rain); Makeup: September 14 as a traditional double-header					
134	September 14 (1)	@ Giants	1–12	Bill Voiselle (20–15)	**Charley Schanz** (12–14)	None	1,668	52–81–1
–	September 14 (2)	@ Giants	Postponed (rain; 1944 Great Atlantic hurricane); Makeup: September 17 in Philadelphia as a traditional double-header					
135	September 15	Giants	7–3	**Ken Raffensberger** (12–18)	Harry Feldman (11–12)	None	3,210	53–81–1
136	September 16 (1)	Giants	5–2	**Dick Barrett** (11–16)	Johnny Allen (4–6)	None	see 2nd game	54–81–1
137	September 16 (2)	Giants	2–1 (10)	**Al Gerheauser** (8–15)	Ewald Pyle (7–8)	None	3,993	55–81–1
138	September 17 (1)	Giants	7–0	**Bill Lee** (10–9)	Cliff Melton (2–1)	None	see 2nd game	56–81–1
139	September 17 (2)	Giants	5–4	**Andy Karl** (3–2)	Jack Brewer (1–4)	None	9,309	57–81–1
–	September 19 (1)	Reds	Postponed (rain); Makeup: September 20 as a traditional double-header					
–	September 19 (2)	Reds	Postponed (rain); Makeup: September 21 as a traditional double-header					
140	September 20 (1)	Reds	3–2	**Charley Schanz** (13–14)	Ed Heusser (13–9)	None	see 2nd game	58–81–1
141	September 20 (2)	Reds	4–6	Bucky Walters (22–8)	**Ken Raffensberger** (12–19)	None	4,161	58–82–1
142	September 21 (1)	Reds	3–5 (12)	Harry Gumbert (13–9)	**Vern Kennedy** (2–10)	None	see 2nd game	58–83–1
143	September 21 (2)	Reds	4–8	Tommy de la Cruz (8–9)	**Dick Barrett** (11–17)	Arnold Carter (2)	3,191	58–84–1
144	September 23	Cardinals	2–6	Bud Byerly (2–1)	**Bill Lee** (10–10)	None	3,341	58–85–1
145	September 24 (1)	Cardinals	3–4 (16)	Mort Cooper (22–7)	**Ken Raffensberger** (12–20)	None	see 2nd game	58–86–1
146	September 24 (2)	Cardinals	0–1	Ted Wilks (17–3)	**Charley Schanz** (13–15)	None	13,480	58–87–1
147	September 25 (1)	Cubs	6–7 (10	Hy Vandenberg (7–4)	**Chet Covington** (1–1)	None	see 2nd game	58–88–1
148	September 25 (2)	Cubs	1–4	Claude Passeau (15–9)	**Dick Barrett** (11–18)	None	1,611	58–89–1
149	September 26 (1)	Cubs	0–15	Hank Wyse (15–15)	**Al Gerheauser** (8–16)	None	see 2nd game	58–90–1
150	September 26 (2)	Cubs	10–1	**Vern Kennedy** (3–10)	Bob Chipman (12–10)	None	1,700	59–90–1
151	September 27	Cubs	3–5 (11)	Red Lynn (5–3)	**Bill Lee** (10–11)	None	1,033	59–91–1
152	September 29^{^{[j]}}	Pirates	3–0	**Ken Raffensberger** (13–20)	Fritz Ostermueller (13–8)	None	1,000	60–91–1
–	September 30^{^{[j]}}	Pirates	Cancelled (rain)					

October (1–1)

#	Date	Opponent	Score	Win	Loss	Save	Attendance	Record
153	October 1 (1)^{^{[j]}}	Pirates	1–9	Rip Sewell (21–12)	**Charley Schanz** (13–16)	None	see 2nd game	60–92–1
154	October 1 (2)^{^{[j]}}	Pirates	7–1	**Dick Barrett** (12–18)	Len Gilmore (0–1)	None	6,492	61–92–1

^{^[a]}The second game on April 30, 1944, ended due to the Pennsylvania Sunday curfew after nine innings with the score tied 2–2, and an additional game was played on June 13.
^{^[b]}The game on May 16, 1944, was suspended (mutual consent between managers to allow the Phillies to catch a train to Cincinnati) after seven innings with the score 6–4 and was completed June 28 with different umpires.
^{^[c]}The second game on May 21, 1944, was suspended (Sunday curfew) after eight innings with the score 9–4 and was completed July 5.
^{^[d]}The original schedule indicated single games on June 12, 14, and 15 with Boston; the June 12 game was moved to June 13 (originally an off-day) and combined with a makeup game (due to the April 30 tie game).
^{^[e]}The original schedule indicated single games on June 19, 20, 21, and 22 at Boston; the June 19 game was moved to June 21 (as a double-header) and ultimately to June 22 (as a double-header).
^{^[f]}The second game on July 16, 1944, was suspended (Sunday curfew) after eight innings with the score 3–6 and was completed September 15.
^{^[g]}The original schedule indicated a single games on July 27 and 28 with St. Louis; it was moved to July 27 (as a double-header).
^{^[h]}Contemporary newspaper accounts indicate that the Phillies finished the August 4 game under protest. Neither Baseball-Reference nor Retrosheet indicates an official protest.
^{^[i]}The original schedule indicated a single game on September 9 with Brooklyn; it was moved to September 8 (originally an off-day).
^{^[j]}The original schedule indicated a single games on September 28, 29, 30, and October 1 with Pittsburgh; variations included double-headers on September 28 and October 1 (with off days in between). The schedule was revised for single games on September 29 and 30 with a double-header on October 1.

=== Roster ===
1944 Philadelphia Phillies
**Roster**
**Pitchers**: 12 Dick Barrett; 22,10 Chet Covington; 19 Deacon Donahue; 23 John Fick; 24,11 Al Gerheauser; 28 Andy Karl; 11 Vern Kennedy; 17 Bill Lee; -- Lou Lucier; 20 Dale Matthewson; 23 Roger McKee; 27 Barney Mussill; 15 Ken Raffensberger; 18 Charlie Ripple; 16 Charley Schanz; 10 Harry Shuman; 49 Al Verdel	**Catchers**: 30 Joe Antolick; 31 Benny Culp; 9 Bob Finley; 19 Johnny Peacock; 24 Andy Seminick; 25 Merv Shea; **Infielders**: 20 Putsy Caballero; 18,7 Ted Cieslak; 21 Granny Hamner; 21 Ray Hamrick; 21 Heinie Heltzel; 6 Charlie Letchas; 29 Tony Lupien; 1 Moon Mullen; 8 Glen Stewart	**Outfielders**: 2 Buster Adams; 26 Chuck Klein; 4 Ron Northey; 48 Lee Riley; 5 Coaker Triplett; 3 Jimmy Wasdell; **Other batters**: -- Nick Goulish; 46 Turkey Tyson	**Manager**: 14 Freddie Fitzsimmons; **Coaches**: 26 Chuck Klein; 25 Merv Shea

== Player stats ==
= Indicates team leader

=== Batting ===
==== Starters by position ====
Note: Pos = Position; G = Games played; AB = At bats; H = Hits; Avg. = Batting average; HR = Home runs; RBI = Runs batted in

Pos	Player	G	AB	H	Avg.	HR	RBI
C	Bob Finley	94	281	70	.249	1	21
1B	Tony Lupien	153	597	169	.283	5	52
2B	Moon Mullen	118	464	124	.267	0	31
SS	Ray Hamrick	74	292	60	.205	1	23
3B	Glen Stewart	118	377	83	.220	0	29
OF	Ron Northey	152	570	164	.288	22	104
OF	Buster Adams	151	584	165	.283	17	64
OF	Jimmy Wasdell	133	451	125	.277	3	40

==== Other batters ====
Note: G = Games played; AB = At bats; H = Hits; Avg. = Batting average; HR = Home runs; RBI = Runs batted in

Player	G	AB	H	Avg.	HR	RBI
Charlie Letchas	116	396	94	.237	0	33
Johnny Peacock	83	253	57	.225	0	21
Ted Cieslak	85	220	54	.245	2	11
Coaker Triplett	84	184	43	.234	1	25
Granny Hamner	21	77	19	.247	0	5
Andy Seminick	22	63	14	.222	0	4
Heinie Heltzel	11	22	4	.182	0	0
Merv Shea	7	15	4	.267	1	1
Lee Riley	4	12	1	.083	0	1
Chuck Klein	4	7	1	.143	0	0
Joe Antolick	4	6	2	.333	0	0
Putsy Caballero	4	4	0	.000	0	0
Benny Culp	4	2	0	.000	0	0
Nick Goulish	1	1	0	.000	0	0
Turkey Tyson	1	1	0	.000	0	0

=== Pitching ===
= Indicates league leader

==== Starting pitchers ====
Note: G = Games pitched; IP = Innings pitched; W = Wins; L = Losses; ERA = Earned run average; SO = Strikeouts

Player	G	IP	W	L	ERA	SO
Ken Raffensberger	37	258.2	13	20	3.06	136
Charley Schanz	40	241.1	13	16	3.32	84
Dick Barrett	37	221.1	12	18	3.86	74
Bill Lee	31	208.1	10	11	3.15	50
Al Gerheauser	30	182.2	8	16	4.58	66
Charlie Ripple	1	2.1	0	0	15.43	2

==== Other pitchers ====
Note: G = Games pitched; IP = Innings pitched; W = Wins; L = Losses; ERA = Earned run average; SO = Strikeouts

Player	G	IP	W	L	ERA	SO
Vern Kennedy	12	55.1	1	5	4.23	23

==== Relief pitchers ====
Note: G = Games pitched; W = Wins; L = Losses; SV = Saves; ERA = Earned run average; SO = Strikeouts

Player	G	W	L	SV	ERA	SO
Andy Karl	38	3	2	2	2.33	26
Chet Covington	19	1	1	0	4.66	13
Harry Shuman	18	0	0	0	4.05	4
Dale Matthewson	17	0	0	0	3.94	8
Barney Mussill	16	0	1	0	6.05	5
Deacon Donahue	6	0	2	0	7.71	2
John Fick	4	0	0	0	3.38	2
Lou Lucier	1	0	0	0	13.50	1
Roger McKee	1	0	0	0	4.50	0
Al Verdel	1	0	0	0	0.00	0

== Farm system ==
Level	Team	League	Manager
A	Utica Blue Sox	Eastern League	Eddie Sawyer
B	Wilmington Blue Rocks	Interstate League	Dutch Dorman and Ray Brubaker
D	Bradford Blue Wings	PONY League	Ray Brubaker and Ken Blackman
