= 1944 St. Louis Cardinals season =

Major League Baseball season

1944 St. Louis Cardinals
- World Series champions National League champions
- League: National League
- Ballpark: Sportsman's Park
- City: St. Louis, Missouri
- Record: 105–49 (.682)
- League place: 1st
- Owner: Sam Breadon
- Manager: Billy Southworth
- Radio: WEW/WTMV (Dizzy Dean, Johnny O'Hara)

The 1944 St. Louis Cardinals season was the team's 63rd season in St. Louis, Missouri and the 53rd season in the National League. The Cardinals went 105 wins and 49 losses during the season and finished first in the National League. In the World Series, they met their town rivals, the St. Louis Browns. They won the series in 6 games to win their 5th World Series title.

== Regular season ==
Shortstop Marty Marion won the MVP Award this year, batting .267, with 6 home runs and 63 RBIs. This was the third consecutive year a Cardinal won the MVP Award, with Mort Cooper winning in 1942 and Stan Musial winning in 1943. Marion was the first shortstop in the history of the National League to win the award.

=== Season standings ===
National League
Team	W	L	Pct.	GB	Home	Road
St. Louis Cardinals	105	49	.682	—	54‍–‍22	51‍–‍27
Pittsburgh Pirates	90	63	.588	14½	49‍–‍28	41‍–‍35
Cincinnati Reds	89	65	.578	16	45‍–‍33	44‍–‍32
Chicago Cubs	75	79	.487	30	35‍–‍42	40‍–‍37
New York Giants	67	87	.435	38	39‍–‍36	28‍–‍51
Boston Braves	65	89	.422	40	38‍–‍40	27‍–‍49
Brooklyn Dodgers	63	91	.409	42	37‍–‍39	26‍–‍52
Philadelphia Phillies	61	92	.399	43½	29‍–‍49	32‍–‍43

=== Record vs. opponents ===
1944 National League record Sources:
Team	BSN	BRO	CHC	CIN	NYG	PHI	PIT	STL
Boston	—	9–13	11–11	8–14	9–13	11–11–1	9–13	8–14
Brooklyn	13–9	—	8–14–1	8–14	10–12	16–6	4–18	4–18
Chicago	11–11	14–8–1	—	9–13–1	10–12	13–9	12–10–1	6–16
Cincinnati	14–8	14–8	13–9–1	—	15–7	13–19	12–10	8–14
New York	13–9	12–10	12–10	7–15	—	10–12	7–15–1	6–16
Philadelphia	11–11–1	6–16	9–13	9–13	12–10	—	9–12	5–17
Pittsburgh	13–9	18–4	10–12–1	10–12	15–7–1	12–9	—	12–10–3
St. Louis	14–8	18–4	16–6	14–8	16–6	17–5	10–12–3	—

=== Roster ===
1944 St. Louis Cardinals
Roster
Pitchers: 31 Harry Brecheen; 27 Bud Byerly; 13 Mort Cooper; 20 Blix Donnelly; 19 Harry Gumbert; 29 Al Jurisich; 21 Max Lanier; 18 Red Munger; 32 Mike Naymick; 11 Freddy Schmidt; 14 Bill Trotter; 28 Ted Wilks	Catchers: 15 Walker Cooper; 2 Bob Keely; 16 Ken O'Dea; Infielders: 18 John Antonelli; 7 George Fallon; 1 Whitey Kurowski; 4 Marty Marion; 5 Ray Sanders; 3 Emil Verban	Outfielders: 17 Augie Bergamo; 9 Debs Garms; 12 Johnny Hopp; 8 Danny Litwhiler; 1 Pepper Martin; 6 Stan Musial	Manager: 30 Billy Southworth; Coaches: 25 Mike González; 26 Buzzy Wares

== Player stats ==
= Indicates team leader

= Indicates league leader

=== Batting ===
==== Starters by position ====
Note: Pos = Position; G = Games played; AB = At bats; H = Hits; Avg. = Batting average; HR = Home runs; RBI = Runs batted in

Pos	Player	G	AB	H	Avg.	HR	RBI
C	Walker Cooper	112	397	126	.317	13	72
1B	Ray Sanders	154	601	177	.295	12	102
2B	Emil Verban	146	498	128	.257	0	43
SS	Marty Marion	144	506	135	.267	6	63
3B	Whitey Kurowski	149	555	150	.270	20	87
LF	Stan Musial	146	568	197*	.347	12	94
CF	Johnny Hopp	139	592	177	.336	11	72
RF	Danny Litwhiler	140	492	130	.264	15	82

- Tied with Phil Cavarretta (Chicago)

==== Other batters ====
Note: G = Games played; AB = At bats; H = Hits; Avg. = Batting average; HR = Home runs; RBI = Runs batted in

Player	G	AB	H	Avg.	HR	RBI
Ken O'Dea	85	265	66	.249	6	37
Augie Bergamo	80	192	55	.286	2	19
Debs Garms	73	149	30	.201	0	5
George Fallon	69	141	28	.199	1	9
Pepper Martin	40	86	24	.279	2	4
John Antonelli	8	21	4	.190	0	1
Bob Keely	1	0	0	.---	0	0

=== Pitching ===
==== Starting pitchers ====
Note: G = Games pitched; IP = Innings pitched; W = Wins; L = Losses; ERA = Earned run average; SO = Strikeouts

Player	G	IP	W	L	ERA	SO
Mort Cooper	34	252.1	22	7	2.46	97
Max Lanier	33	224.1	17	12	2.65	141
Ted Wilks	36	207.2	17	4	2.64	88
Harry Brecheen	30	189.1	16	5	2.85	88
Red Munger	21	121.1	11	3	1.34	55
Harry Gumbert	10	61.1	4	2	2.49	16

==== Other pitchers ====
Note: G = Games pitched; IP = Innings pitched; W = Wins; L = Losses; ERA = Earned run average; SO = Strikeouts

Player	G	IP	W	L	ERA	SO
Al Jurisich	30	130.0	7	9	3.39	53
Bud Byerly	9	42.1	2	2	3.40	13
Bill Trotter	2	6.0	0	1	13.50	0

==== Relief pitchers ====
Note: G = Games pitched; W = Wins; L = Losses; SV = Saves; ERA = Earned run average; SO = Strikeouts

Player	G	W	L	SV	ERA	SO
Freddy Schmidt	37	7	3	5	3.15	58
Blix Donnelly	27	2	1	2	2.12	45
Mike Naymick	1	0	0	0	4.50	1

== 1944 World Series ==
NL St. Louis Cardinals (4) vs. AL St. Louis Browns (2)

Game	Score	Date
1	Browns 2, Cardinals 1	October 4
2	Cardinals 3, Browns 2 (11 innings)	October 5
3	Browns 6, Cardinals 2	October 6
4	Cardinals 5, Browns 1	October 7
5	Cardinals 2, Browns 0	October 8
6	Cardinals 3, Browns 1	October 9

== Farm system ==
Level	Team	League	Manager
AA	Columbus Red Birds	American Association	Nick Cullop
AA	Rochester Red Wings	International League	Ken Penner
AA	Sacramento Solons	Pacific Coast League	Earl Sheely
B	Allentown Cardinals	Interstate League	Ollie Vanek
B	Lynchburg Cardinals	Piedmont League	George Ferrell
D	Johnson City Cardinals	Appalachian League	George Smith
D	Lima Red Birds	Ohio State League	Runt Marr and Jack Norris

LEAGUE CHAMPIONS: Lynchburg
