= Ripple =

Ripple may refer to:

== Science and technology ==
- Capillary wave, commonly known as ripple, a wave traveling along the phase boundary of a fluid
  - Ripple, more generally a disturbance, for example of spacetime in gravitational waves
- Ripple (electrical), residual periodic variation in DC voltage during ac to dc conversion
  - Ripple current, pulsed current draw caused by some non-linear devices and circuits
  - Frequency-domain ripple
  - Ringing (signal), oscillation of a signal, particularly in the step response
- Polarization ripples, appearing after irradiation of a solid by energy flux (laser, ions, etc.)
- Ripple marks, as identified in sediments and sedimentary rocks
- Ripple (payment protocol), a real-time payment system by Ripple Labs
- Ripple control, a form of electrical load management
- Various brainwave patterns, including those which follow sharp waves in the hippocampus
- Ripple I and Ripple II, 1962 US nuclear bomb tests in Operation Dominic

== Organizations ==
- Ripple (charitable organisation), a non-profit click-to-donate internet site and search engine
- Ripple Labs, the firm that created the Ripple payment protocol
- Ripple Foods, a brand of pea-protein dairy alternative products

== Arts and entertainment ==
- Ripple, a phenomenon in JoJo's Bizarre Adventure
- Ripples (musical), a musical comedy theatrical production
- Ripples, a Japanese film directed by Naoko Ogigami
- Ripple (My Little Pony)
- Ripple (newspaper), student newspaper at the University of Leicester

=== TV ===
- "Ripple" (Naruto episode), an episode in an anime series
- Ripple (TV series), American drama series
- Ripples (TV series), Italian animated series

=== Music ===
- Ripple (band), an American soul/funk band
- "Ripples", a 2019 album by Ian Brown
- "Ripple" (song), a 1970 song by the Grateful Dead from their album American Beauty
- "Ripple", a song from the album Priest=Aura by The Church
- "Ripples...", a song from the album A Trick of the Tail by Genesis
- "Ripple", a 2025 track by Toby Fox from Deltarune Chapters 3+4 OST from the video game Deltarune

== Places ==
- Ripple, Kent, a village in England
- Ripple, Worcestershire, a village in England
- Ripples, New Brunswick, Canada
- Ripple River, US

== Other uses ==
- USS Ripple, several US Navy ships
- Ripple (wine), a discontinued brand of flavored fortified wine
- Ripple (Washington Post), section in the website of The Washington Post

== People with the surname ==
- Jimmy Ripple (1909–1959), baseball player
- Kenneth Francis Ripple (born 1943), Senior United States Circuit Judge
- Mark Ripple (born 1967), businessperson and author
- Richard E. Ripple (1931–2010), American educational psychologist
- Charlie Ripple (1920–1979), pitcher in Major League Baseball
- Ezra H. Ripple (1842–1909), Pennsylvania businessman, politician and soldier
- John Ripple (1897–1965), college football player
- William J. Ripple (born 1952), professor of ecology

=== Fictional character ===
- Wade Ripple, character from the 2023 Pixar animated film Elemental

== See also ==
- Ripple effect (disambiguation)
- Raspberry Ripple, a flavour of ice-cream
- Ripple Island (disambiguation)
