= Verdel =

Verdel may refer to:

- Al Verdel (1921-1991), American baseball player
- Verdel, Nebraska, United States
