= Rippel =

Rippel is a surname. Notable people with the surname include:

- Cassio Rippel (born 1978), Brazilian sport shooter
- Sandra Rippel (born 1961), Canadian curler
- Wally Rippel, American electrical engineer

== See also ==
- Ripple (disambiguation)
