= Lee Handley =

American baseball player (1913–1970)

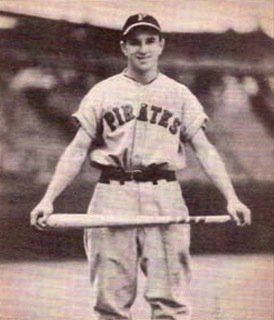
- Third baseman
- Born: July 31, 1913; Clarion, Iowa, U.S.
- Died: April 8, 1970 (aged 56); Pittsburgh, Pennsylvania, U.S.
- Batted: Right Threw: Right

MLB debut
- April 15, 1936, for the Cincinnati Reds

Last MLB appearance
- September 28, 1947, for the Philadelphia Phillies

MLB statistics
- Batting average: .269
- Home runs: 15
- Runs batted in: 297
- Stats at Baseball Reference

Teams
- Cincinnati Reds (1936); Pittsburgh Pirates (1937–1941, 1944–1946); Philadelphia Phillies (1947)

Career highlights and awards
- NL stolen base leader (1939)

Lee Elmer Handley (July 31, 1913 – April 8, 1970) was an American professional baseball second baseman and third baseman. He played in Major League Baseball from 1936 to 1947 for the Cincinnati Reds, Pittsburgh Pirates, and Philadelphia Phillies. His younger brother, Gene, also played in the major leagues from 1946 to 1947.

== Early years ==
Handley played baseball for Soldan High School and the Jerome Goldman Post American Legion team in St. Louis, Missouri. The Goldman team won the Missouri championship "due to a large degree to Handley's hitting and fielding."

== College sports ==
Handley played quarterback for Bradley Polytechnic Institute, with his accomplishments including a 50-yard pass that won a game in 1934. An article in the May 25, 1937, issue of the Pittsburgh Post-Gazette described him as the "leading quarterback of the conference, featured schedule with his passing running and kicking."

In 1933, Handley won the Most Valuable Player Award in football in the Interstate Intercollegiate Athletic Conference, and he was an all-conference second baseman two years. He also was a guard and captain on the basketball team and ran track at Bradley.

== Baseball ==
Handley originally signed with the Cincinnati Reds, but Commissioner Kenesaw Mountain Landis voided the contract, resulting in Handley's signing with Pittsburgh for a $20,000 bonus.

In 1939 Handley hit a career-high average of .285 and tied for the National League lead in stolen bases (17), despite suffering a serious beaning that kept him out of the lineup for 52 games. He also was hurt in an automobile accident before the 1942 season, but returned in 1945 to hit .298 in 98 games.

Jackie Robinson, the first Black player in Major League Baseball, named Handley, who played for the Phillies in 1947, as the first opposing player to wish him well, and stated that he even apologized for the behavior of his teammates and his manager Ben Chapman, who had attacked Jackie with racial insults on the field.

In a 10-season career, Handley was a .269 hitter with 15 home runs and 297 runs batted in during his 968 games, including a solid 1.31 walk-to-strikeout ratio (267-to-204).

== Post-baseball career ==
In 1954, Handley and Frankie Gustine began a daily 15-minute sports program on KDKA radio in Pittsburgh, Pennsylvania. They had previously worked together on both radio and TV programs.

== Death ==
An alumnus of Bradley University, Handley died of an apparent heart attack in Pittsburgh, Pennsylvania, at the age of 56.

== See also ==
- List of Major League Baseball annual stolen base leaders
