= Charley Schanz =

American baseball player (1919–1992)

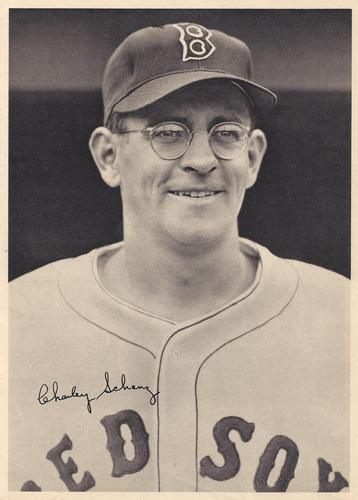
- Pitcher
- Born: June 8, 1919; Anacortes, Washington, U.S.
- Died: May 28, 1992 (aged 72); Sacramento, California, U.S.
- Batted: Right Threw: Right

MLB debut
- April 20, 1944, for the Philadelphia Phillies

Last MLB appearance
- July 2, 1950, for the Boston Red Sox

MLB statistics
- Win–loss record: 28–43
- Earned run average: 4.34
- Strikeouts: 243
- Stats at Baseball Reference

Teams
- Philadelphia Phillies (1944–1947); Boston Red Sox (1950)

Charles Murrell Schanz (June 8, 1919 – May 28, 1992) was an American professional baseball player, a pitcher whose career extended for 17 seasons (1938–54). He appeared in Major League Baseball for the Philadelphia Phillies (1944–47) and Boston Red Sox (1950). The 6 ft 3 in (1.91 m), 215 lb (98 kg) right-hander was a native of Anacortes, Washington.

Schanz had a successful rookie season (13–16, 3.32, for the last place 1944 Phillies) but was relatively ineffective after that, posting a 5.03 ERA in his last four years. He made his big league debut on April 20, 1944, starting and losing 8–2 to the Brooklyn Dodgers at Shibe Park. His first major league win came in his second start five days later, a 12-inning 4–3 home victory over the New York Giants. He pitched his first major-league shutout on September 3, 1945 vs. the Boston Braves in the second game of a home doubleheader. The score was 5–0.

Schanz's key pitch was his fastball. A 1949 issue of the Pacific Coast Baseball News put it plainly: "Charley is fast – very fast ...."

Schanz had a tendency to be wild, as he finished in the league's top ten for the following categories: bases on balls allowed (1944 and 1945), wild pitches (1944 and 1946), and hit batsmen (1944, 1945, and 1946). One highlight as a relief pitcher, however, was finishing in the top ten for saves three straight seasons (1944–1946).

Career MLB totals for 155 games pitched include a 28–43 record, 72 games started, 23 complete games, 2 shutouts, 49 games finished, and 14 saves. He allowed 302 earned runs in 626 2/3 innings pitched for an ERA of 4.34. During his long minor league career (1938–43; 1948–54), Schanz appeared in 455 games and fashioned a 145–144 (3.96) record in 2,510 1/3 innings of work. He won 22 games for the 1949 Seattle Rainiers of the Pacific Coast League.

Schanz died at the age of 72 in Sacramento, California.
