= Moon Mullen =

American baseball player (1917-2013)

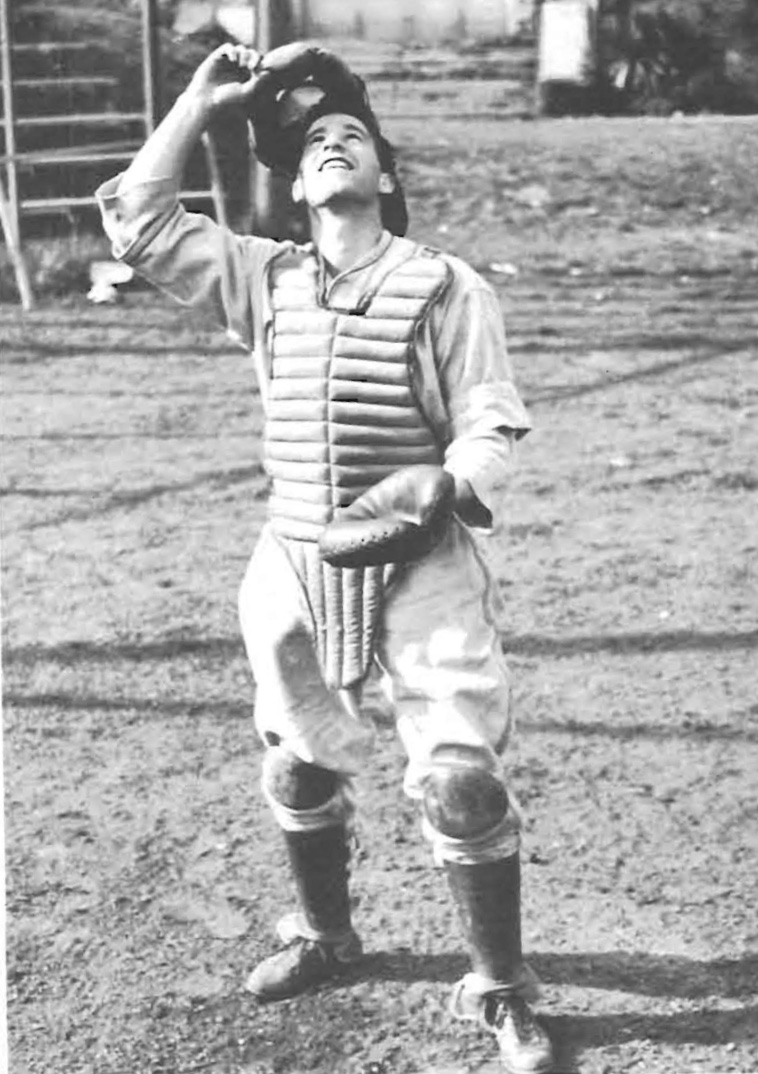
- Mullen from the 1939 Oregana
- Second baseman
- Born: February 9, 1917; Olympia, Washington, U.S.
- Died: February 28, 2013 (aged 96); Stanwood, Washington, U.S.
- Batted: Left Threw: Right

MLB debut
- April 18, 1944, for the Philadelphia Phillies

Last MLB appearance
- October 1, 1944, for the Philadelphia Phillies

MLB statistics
- Batting average: .267
- Home runs: 0
- Runs batted in: 31
- Stats at Baseball Reference

Teams
- Philadelphia Phillies (1944)

Ford Parker "Moon" Mullen (February 9, 1917 – February 28, 2013) was an American second baseman in Major League Baseball who played one year for the Philadelphia Blue Jays during the 1944 season. Listed at 5' 9", 165 lb., Mullen batted left-handed and threw right-handed. He attended the University of Oregon, where he played baseball and basketball, and was a member of the basketball team that won the first NCAA men's basketball championship.

== Early life ==
Mullen was born in Olympia, Washington. He received the nickname "Moon" after the popular comic strip character "Moon Mullins". Mullen attended the University of Oregon, where he played baseball and basketball. He was a reserve guard on the 1938–39 Oregon Ducks men's basketball team coached by Howard Hobson, and winners of the first ever NCAA Division I men's basketball tournament. On the baseball team (also coached by Hobson), he played third base, catcher, and second base.

== Professional career ==
In 1944, Mullen played 118 games for the Philadelphia Blue Jays (as the Philadelphia Phillies were briefly known), posting a .267 batting average (124-for-464) with 51 runs and 31 RBI, including nine doubles, four triples, four stolen bases, and a .315 on-base percentage with no home runs. Following the 1944 season, Mullen was one of many major leaguers who saw his baseball career interrupted by a stint in the United States Army during World War II. He missed the 1945 and 1946 seasons, then attended spring training with the Phillies but did not make the team. He played most of the rest of his career in the Pacific Coast League with the Portland Beavers. His last professional season was spent as player-manager for the 1950 Boise Pilots of the Pioneer League.

== After baseball ==
He was married to his wife Jessie, whom he met at a high school football game, for 72 years. After his baseball career, he returned to Olympia where he coached the Olympia High School baseball team and taught high school biology and zoology for 27 years before his retirement.

He died in Stanwood, Washington on February 28, 2013. He had suffered a stroke two weeks prior to his death. At the age of 96 he was the last surviving member of the Ducks' 1939 NCAA team and was one of the oldest living major league ballplayers.

== See also ==
- 1944 Philadelphia Phillies season
