= Ripple Effect (disambiguation) =

A ripple effect is a situation where an effect from an initial state can be followed outwards incrementally.

Ripple Effect may refer to:

- Ripple Effect (puzzle), a logic puzzle published by Nikoli
- Ripple Effect project, project to provide the poor with clean safe water started in 2009
- "Ripple Effect" (Stargate SG-1), a 2006 television episode
- Flux Family Secrets: The Ripple Effect, hidden object puzzle-adventure casual game
- 7/7 Ripple Effect, 2007 film
- Ripple Effect (film), a 2007 film starring Forest Whitaker
- "The Ripple Effect" (CSI: NY), a 2012 television episode
- "The Ripple Effect" (Blood & Oil), a 2015 television episode
- Ripple Effect Studios, a video game developer and subsidiary of Electronic Arts
