= Homer Spragins =

American baseball player (1920-2002)

- Pitcher
- Born: November 9, 1920; Grenada, Mississippi, U.S.
- Died: December 10, 2002 (aged 82); Minter City, Mississippi, U.S.
- Batted: Right Threw: Right

MLB debut
- September 13, 1947, for the Philadelphia Phillies

Last MLB appearance
- September 21, 1947, for the Philadelphia Phillies

MLB statistics
- Win–loss record: 0–0
- Earned run average: 6.75
- Strikeouts: 3
- Stats at Baseball Reference

Teams
- Philadelphia Phillies (1947)

Homer Franklin Spragins (November 9, 1920 – December 10, 2002) was an American professional baseball pitcher. Spragins pitched in four games, all relief appearances, for the Philadelphia Phillies in 1947.

Spragins was a dual-sport athlete at Mississippi State University, playing both baseball and basketball. He briefly served as head basketball coach at Arkansas Tech while still playing in the minor leagues.
