= Benny Culp =

American baseball player (1914-2000)

- Catcher
- Born: January 19, 1914; Philadelphia, Pennsylvania, U.S.
- Died: October 23, 2000 (aged 86); Philadelphia, Pennsylvania, U.S.
- Batted: Right Threw: Right

MLB debut
- September 17, 1942, for the Philadelphia Phillies

Last MLB appearance
- July 9, 1944, for the Philadelphia Phillies

MLB statistics
- Batting average: .192
- Home runs: 0
- Runs batted in: 2
- Stats at Baseball Reference

Teams
- Philadelphia Phillies (1942–1944)

Benjamin Baldy Culp (January 19, 1914 – October 23, 2000) was an American professional baseball player and coach. A catcher, he appeared in 15 Major League games for the Philadelphia Phillies (1942–44). He threw and batted right-handed, stood 5 feet 9 inches (1.75 m) tall and weighed 175 pounds (79 kg).

Culp was selected as part of the United States national baseball team that represented the country at the 1941 Amateur World Series, held in Havana, Cuba. The U.S. team finished sixth in the tournament.

Culp is one of many ballplayers who only appeared in the Major Leagues during World War II, making his debut on September 17, 1942, in a home game against the Chicago Cubs at Shibe Park. Culp served in the United States Navy during the last two years of the war. He then returned to the MLB Phillies as a coach during the 1946–47 seasons, working under manager Ben Chapman.

His MLB career totals include 15 games played, 5 hits in 26 at bats (.192), a .276 on-base percentage, 2 runs batted in, and 5 runs scored. In the field he handled 25 of 27 total chances successfully for a fielding percentage of .926, well below the league average at the time.

Culp died in his hometown of Philadelphia, Pennsylvania, at the age of 86.
