= Jack Albright =

American baseball player (1921-1991)

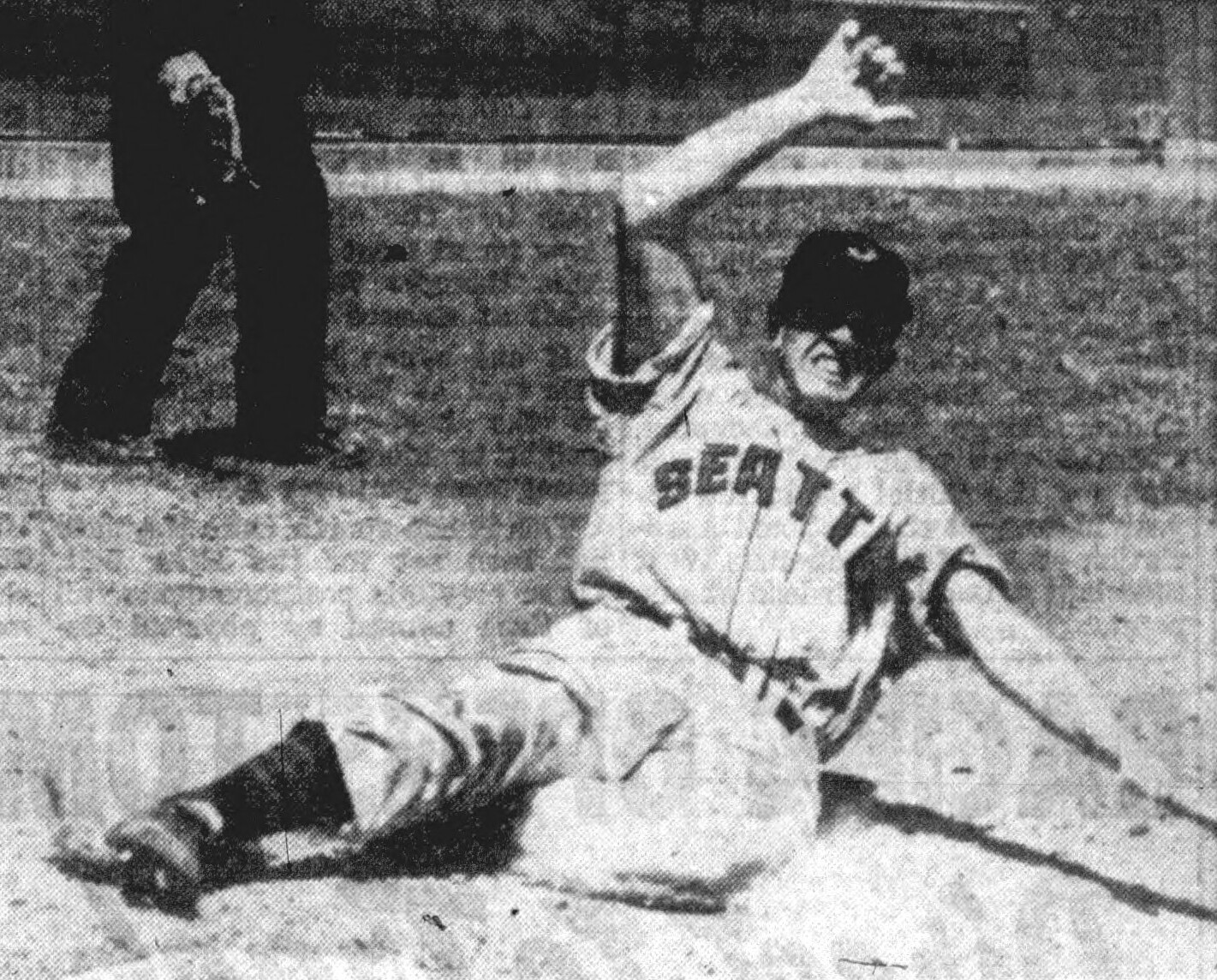
- Albright in 1950
- Shortstop
- Born: June 30, 1921; St. Petersburg, Florida, U.S.
- Died: July 22, 1991 (aged 70); San Diego, California, U.S.
- Batted: Right Threw: Right

MLB debut
- May 19, 1947, for the Philadelphia Phillies

Last MLB appearance
- July 27, 1947, for the Philadelphia Phillies

MLB statistics
- Batting average: .232
- Hits: 23
- Runs batted in: 5
- Stats at Baseball Reference

Teams
- Philadelphia Phillies (1947)

Harold John Albright (June 30, 1921 – June 22, 1991) was an American Major League Baseball player. Albright played for the Philadelphia Phillies in the 1947 season. He batted and threw right-handed. In 41 games, Albright had 23 hits in 99 at-bats, he also had two home runs and eight errors at shortstop.

== Biography ==
Albright was born in St. Petersburg, Florida. He went to high school in San Diego, where he also played on a national champion American Legion team. He attended the University of California, Berkeley, and he played shortstop on the baseball team. While at Cal, Albright was a member of Phi Sigma Kappa fraternity. Professional baseball scouts took an interest in Albright as soon as 1941, his sophomore year at Cal. A 1943 United Press article noted Albright's reputation as the best shortstop to ever come out of the university. Albright studied commerce at Cal and he had a batting average of around .350 in four seasons.

In June 1943, Albright was signed by the Boston Red Sox and assigned to one of their minor league teams, the Louisville Colonels. The Boston organization signed him even though he was a naval reservist and was expected to be called into active duty on August 2. The organization praised Albright's work ethic and his alertness on the field. The Louisville manager, Bill Burwell, said that Albright compared favorably to any shortstop he had seen, including Johnny Pesky and Pee Wee Reese, but Albright soon entered active military duty, serving on the USS Bebas through 1946.

Albright returned to the Colonels after his military discharge, and his contract was purchased by the Philadelphia Phillies in 1947. He appeared with the major league team for about two months before breaking his leg. After his injury, Albright did not return to the major leagues, and he was out of professional baseball by 1951.

He died in 1991 in San Diego, California.
