= Gene Handley =

American baseball player (1914-2009)

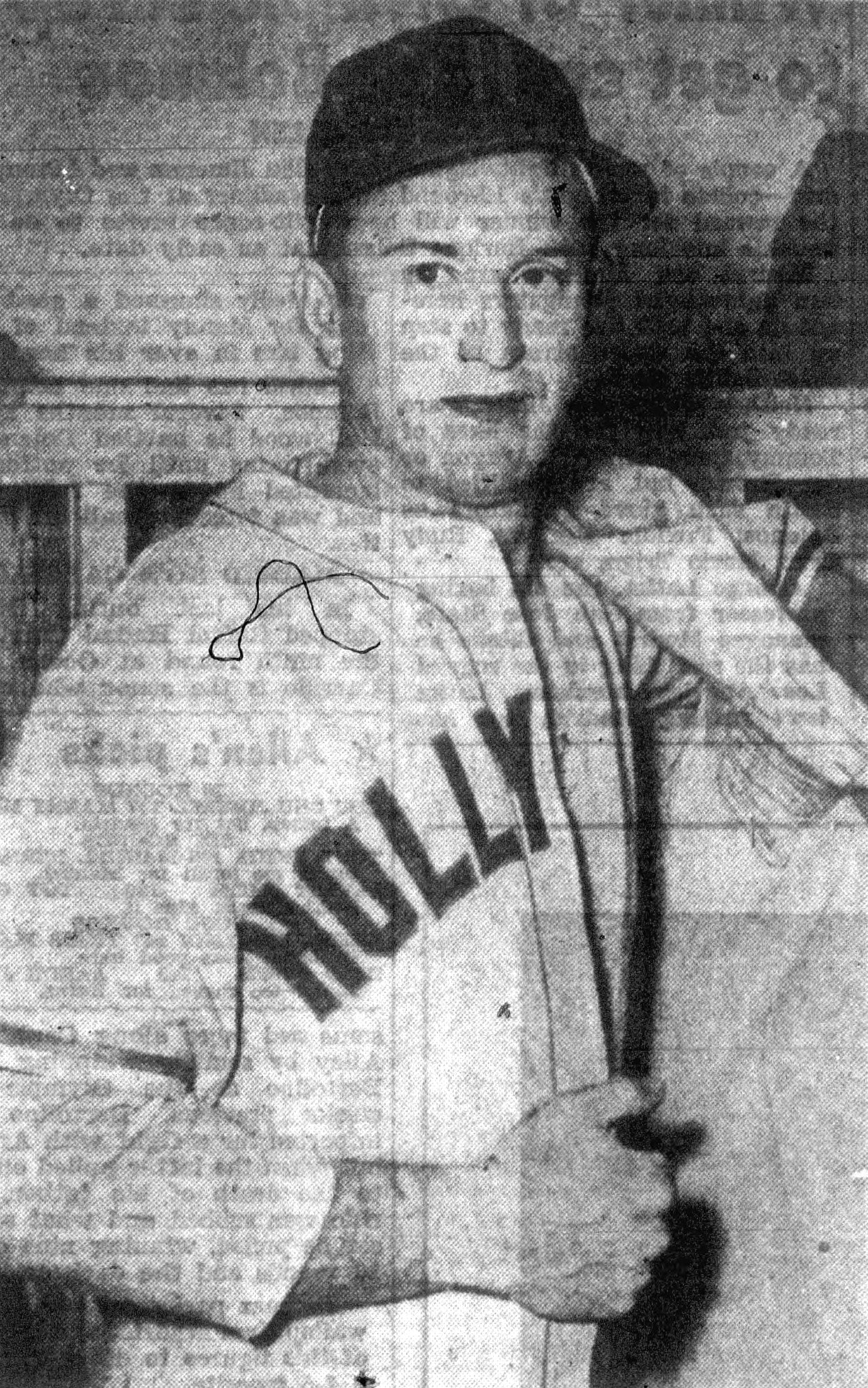
- Handley, circa 1951
- Infielder
- Born: November 25, 1914; Kennett, Missouri, U.S.
- Died: April 12, 2009 (aged 94); Tucson, Arizona, U.S.
- Batted: Right Threw: Right

MLB debut
- April 16, 1946, for the Philadelphia Athletics

Last MLB appearance
- September 28, 1947, for the Philadelphia Athletics

MLB statistics
- Batting average: .252
- Home runs: 0
- Runs batted in: 29
- Stats at Baseball Reference

Teams
- Philadelphia Athletics (1946–1947)

Eugene Louis Handley (November 25, 1914 – April 12, 2009) was an American professional baseball player and scout. Born in Kennett, Missouri, he was a versatile player during his pro career (1935–1942; 1944–1954) who spent two seasons in Major League Baseball as a utility infielder for the 1946–1947 Philadelphia Athletics. Handley batted and threw right-handed; he stood 5 feet 10 inches (1.78 m) tall and weighed 165 pounds (75 kg). He was the younger brother of Lee Handley and attended Bradley University.

Gene Handley spent ten seasons in minor league baseball before winning a job with the 1946 Athletics. He broke into the professional game as an outfielder, but he soon converted to a third baseman, and also played second base and shortstop in the minors. In 125 MLB games played — 85 at second base, 14 at third base and two at shortstop — Handley was a .252 hitter (86-for-341) with 10 doubles, six triples, 41 runs, 29 RBI, and nine stolen bases. After his playing career, Handley was a minor league manager, then a longtime scout, for the Chicago Cubs, working in the Chicago organization for 54 years and signing players such as 1962 NL Rookie of the Year Ken Hubbs, Dick Ellsworth, Mike Krukow and Pete LaCock. He died in Tucson, Arizona, at the age of 94.
