= Al Javery =

American baseball player (1918-1977)

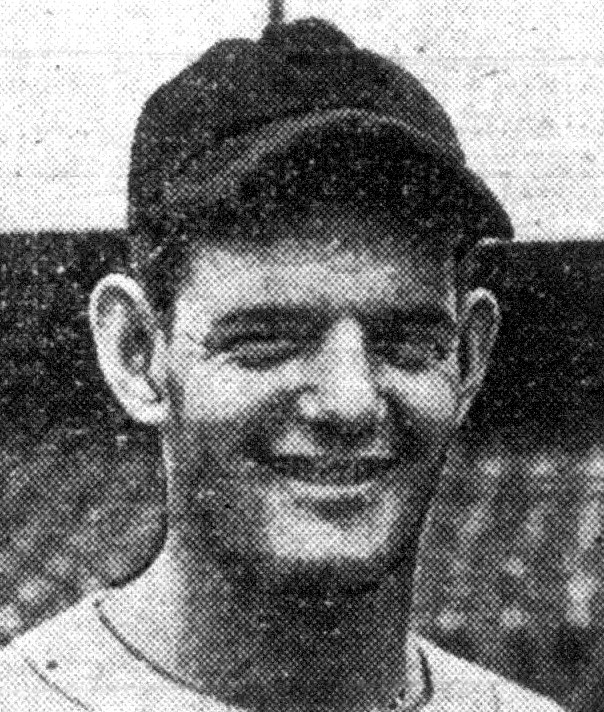
- Javery, circa 1943
- Pitcher
- Born: June 5, 1918; Worcester, Massachusetts, U.S.
- Died: August 16, 1977 (aged 59); Putnam, Connecticut, U.S.
- Batted: Right Threw: Right

MLB debut
- April 23, 1940, for the Boston Bees

Last MLB appearance
- May 8, 1946, for the Boston Braves

MLB statistics
- Win–loss record: 53–74
- Earned run average: 3.80
- Strikeouts: 470
- Stats at Baseball Reference

Teams
- Boston Bees / Braves (1940–1946)

Career highlights and awards
- 2× All-Star (1943, 1944)

Alva William Javery (June 5, 1918 – August 16, 1977) was an American professional Major League Baseball pitcher who played from 1940 to 1946, spending all seven seasons with the Boston Bees / Braves. He became a key part of the rotation during World War II, which he did not serve in due to varicose veins. Nicknamed "Beartracks", he made his debut on April 23, 1940.

Javery spent the 1940 season primarily as a relief pitcher, starting four games and pitching in 29 total, finishing with a 2–4 record. In 1941, he became a starter for the Braves, notching nine complete games in 23 starts, earning a 10–11 record in the process. The 1942 season marked the beginning of his workhorse years, finishing fifth in the National League in innings pitched with 261. He was second on the team to Jim Tobin, who led the league. Javery also started a league-leading 37 games, and finished the season with a 3.03 ERA and was 31st in MVP voting. In 1943, Javery arguably had his best season. He led the league in innings pitched with 303, led the league in batters faced with 1286, finished with a 17–16 record, the only winning record of his career, and finished 17th in MVP voting. He also pitched the final two innings of the 1943 All-Star Game, his first, strikings out three and not allowing a run en route to a 5–3 American League win. He was again named to the All-Star Game in 1944, but he did not pitch.

Javery finished the 1944 season with 254 innings pitched, a 10–19 record, and a 3.54 ERA, and finished second in the National League in strikeouts per 9 innings. He showed signs of slowing down in the 1945 season, after pitching in only 17 games and winning two. Two games early in the 1946 season marked the end of his career with the Braves. He was released on May 23, 1946, and sent to the Toronto Maple Leafs of the International League due to arm trouble the previous two seasons. Javery died on August 16, 1977, in Putnam, Connecticut.
