= Ripple Effect Project =

The Ripple Effect Project is a joint project of Acumen Fund and IDEO funded by the Bill and Melinda Gates Foundation to provide the poor with clean safe water started in 2009. It has projects in both India and Kenya. The project collaborated with the Jal Bhagirathi Foundation, a non-profit in India, to fix a failed clean water station in the Thar Desert of India where locals were choosing to use closer contaminated water or contaminating clean water with non hygienic water vessels, and turned the resulting working project over to locals. The project collaborated with four Kenyan organizations, two of which were companies, to build commercial clean water supply systems using various methods of delivery.
