= Chet Covington =

American baseball player (1910–1976)

- Pitcher
- Born: November 6, 1910; Cairo, Illinois, U.S.
- Died: June 11, 1976 (aged 65); Pembroke Park, Florida, U.S.
- Batted: Both Threw: Left

MLB debut
- April 23, 1944, for the Philadelphia Phillies

Last MLB appearance
- September 26, 1944, for the Philadelphia Phillies

MLB statistics
- Win–loss record: 1–1
- Earned run average: 4.66
- Strikeouts: 13
- Stats at Baseball Reference

Teams
- Philadelphia Phillies (1944)

Chester Rogers Covington (November 6, 1910 – June 11, 1976) was an American Major League Baseball pitcher who played for the Philadelphia Phillies in 1944. The 33-year-old rookie, recipient of The Sporting News Minor League Player of the Year Award in 1943, was a native of Cairo, Illinois.

Covington is one of many ballplayers who only appeared in the major leagues during World War II. He made his major league debut on April 23, 1944, in a doubleheader against the Boston Braves at Braves Field. His first and only major-league win was in the first game of a doubleheader against the Braves at Shibe Park on April 30, 1944. He pitched in relief and was the pitcher of record in a 14-inning, 2–1 victory.

For the season, part of which was spent in the minor leagues, he appeared in 19 games, all in relief, and had a 1–1 record with 10 games finished. He allowed 20 earned runs in 38 2/3 innings pitched for a final ERA of 4.66. In addition, Covington pitched 15 seasons in minor league baseball, winning minor league 220 games.

Covington died at the age of 65 in Pembroke Park, Florida.
