= Ripple (Washington Post) =

Section in the website of The Washington Post

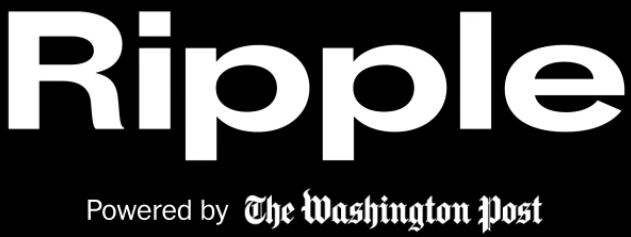
- Website type: News aggregator
- Available in: English
- Owner: The Washington Post
- Key people: Lippe Oosterhof
- Website: www.washingtonpost.com/ripple/
- Launched: December 2025
- Current status: Active

Ripple is a section in the website of The Washington Post that republishes opinion pieces of various American newspapers and blogs. Ripple is independent from the opinion section of the Post and is not subject to the Post's paywalls. It was officially launched in December 2025.

== History ==
In June 2025, The New York Times revealed that The Washington Post was planning to launch a program called Ripple that would allow columnists, including non-professional writers, from various American newspapers and blogs such as Substack to publish opinion pieces. Ripple will be operated independently from the opinion section of the Post and not subject to any paywalls. Executives of the Post said that the program aims to attract readers who want more diversity in the content of the Post's opinion section. They estimated that Ripple may reach an audience of 38 million people in the United States. The development of the project was headed by strategic adviser of the Post Lippe Oosterhof. Its research and development was started in 2024.

Non-professional writers writing for Ripple will be allowed to utilize AI tool called Ember, designed by the Post to help them write articles. Reportedly, the tool will guide writers through the writing process of the article, advising them on creating an "early thesis", "supporting points", and a "memorable ending", and will also evaluate their progress using a "story strength" tracker. The articles will be reviewed by human editors before being published.

The Post planned partnerships with several newspapers, such as The Salt Lake Tribune, The Atlanta Journal-Constitution, and The Dispatсh, to republish their content on Ripple and hired an editor to oversee editing process of the program. A collaboration with Substack blogger Matt Yglesias was also planned. The Salt Lake Tribune later declined to participate in the program, publisher of The Journal-Constitution also declined the offer. In an interview, Chief Technology Officer of the Post Vineet Khosla said the Post is looking at opinion sections of publications across the United States to offer them partnerships with Ripple.

Ripple was officially launched in December 2025. It was described by multiple sources as an "opinion news aggregator". In June 2026, two Ripple op-eds were deleted after Politico discovered their author to be an editor of white nationalist publication Radix Journal. After being asked about the incident, the Post said that Ripple is independent from its journalism.

== Reception ==
Noor Al-Sibai of Futurism compared Ripple to contributor networks of Forbes and HuffPost. Author Jonathan V. Last, writing for The Bulwark, called Ripple the "dumbest idea in media since Quibi" and said it "betrays a fundamental misunderstanding of what the Post is". He said that Ripple could only work if the Post "embraces" publishing AI-generated content. Writer M.G. Siegler said that Ripple will make the Post become like Forbes and will "destroy the brand and credibility built over decades".

Journalist Josh Marshall of Talking Points Memo described Ripple as "brand damaging" and said that most publications contacted by the Post to write for Ripple don't want to be associated with it. Amanda Katz of The Atlantic said that the Post could be flooded with low quality AI content due to usage of Ember.
