= Emil Verban =

American baseball player (1915–1989)

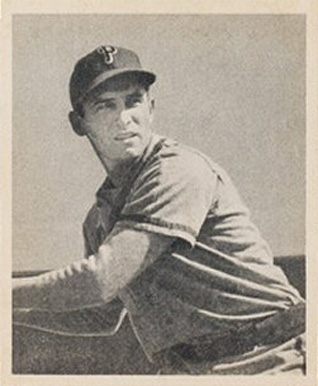
- Second baseman
- Born: August 27, 1915; Lincoln, Illinois, U.S.
- Died: June 8, 1989 (aged 73); Quincy, Illinois, U.S.
- Batted: Right Threw: Right

MLB debut
- April 18, 1944, for the St. Louis Cardinals

Last MLB appearance
- October 1, 1950, for the Boston Braves

MLB statistics
- Batting average: .272
- Home runs: 1
- Runs batted in: 241
- Stats at Baseball Reference

Teams
- St. Louis Cardinals (1944–1946); Philadelphia Phillies (1946–1948); Chicago Cubs (1948–1950); Boston Braves (1950)

Career highlights and awards
- 3× All-Star (1945–1947); World Series champion (1944)

Emil Matthew Verban (his original Serbian name is Vrban; August 27, 1915 – June 8, 1989) was a second baseman in Major League Baseball who played for the St. Louis Cardinals (1944–1946), Philadelphia Phillies (1946–1948), Chicago Cubs (1948–1950) and Boston Braves (1950). Verban batted and threw right-handed. He was born in Lincoln, Illinois.

Verban was a second baseman noted primarily for his fielding with four National League teams from 1944 through 1950. Verban did not reach the major leagues until the age of 28, when he joined the St. Louis Cardinals. He distinguished himself in the 1944 World Series against the St. Louis Browns, batting .412 (7 for 17) and driving in the deciding run in Game Six as the Cardinals won, 4 games to 2. Browns owner Don Barnes had earned the ire of Verban after refusing his request for a better seat for his pregnant wife. After the final game of the series, Verban was quoted as saying, "Now you can sit behind the post, meathead", in reference to Barnes.

His most productive season came in 1945, when he hit .278 and posted career highs in runs (59), hits (166), doubles (22), triples (8) and runs batted in (72), and led the National League in games played (155) and fielding percentage (.978).

Verban also played for the Chicago Cubs, Philadelphia Phillies and Boston Braves, and made two consecutive appearances in the All-Star Game (1946 and 1947). In 1947, he became the first Phillies second baseman to start an All-Star game. A good contact hitter, from 1947 to 1948 he led the league in at-bats per strikeouts (67.5 and 34.8).

In a seven-season career, Verban posted a .272 average with one home run and 241 RBI in 853 games. His lone home run occurred on September 6, 1948. Verban had had 2,592 MLB at-bats before connecting for his lone career home run—a record for futility that still stands.

In 1975, a group of Chicago Cubs fans based in Washington, D.C. formed the Emil Verban Society to honor him. Verban was picked as the epitome of a Cubs player, competent but obscure and typifying the work ethic. Verban initially believed he was being ridiculed, but his ill feeling disappeared several years later when he was flown to Washington to meet President Ronald Reagan, also a society member, at the White House.

Verban died in Quincy, Illinois, at the age of 73.
