= Ed Heusser =

American baseball player (1909–1956)

- Pitcher
- Born: May 7, 1909; Salt Lake County, Utah, U.S.
- Died: March 1, 1956 (aged 46); Aurora, Colorado, U.S.
- Batted: Switch Threw: Right

MLB debut
- April 25, 1935, for the St. Louis Cardinals

Last MLB appearance
- September 14, 1948, for the Philadelphia Phillies

MLB statistics
- Win–loss record: 56–67
- Earned run average: 3.69
- Strikeouts: 299
- Stats at Baseball Reference

Teams
- St. Louis Cardinals (1935–1936); Philadelphia Phillies (1938); Philadelphia Athletics (1940); Cincinnati Reds (1943–1946); Philadelphia Phillies (1948)

Career highlights and awards
- NL ERA leader (1944)

Edward Burlton Heusser (May 7, 1909 – March 1, 1956) was an American professional baseball pitcher whose 20-season (1929–1948) pro career included 266 games pitched in Major League Baseball (MLB) over nine seasons for the St. Louis Cardinals (1935–1936), Philadelphia Phillies (1938 and 1948), Philadelphia Athletics (1940) and Cincinnati Reds (1943–1946). In 1944, he led the National League in earned run average with a sparkling 2.38 mark in 1922/3 innings pitched. He earned the colorful nickname of "The Wild Elk of Wasatch".

Heusser was born in Salt Lake County, Utah. He threw and batted right-handed, and was listed as 6 feet (1.8 m) tall and 187 pounds (85 kg).

Of his 266 career appearances, 104 were starts. He posted 50 complete games and ten shutouts, with 19 saves recorded as a relief pitcher. He compiled a 56–67 won–lost record with a 3.69 earned run average. In 1,087 career innings pitched, he permitted 1,167 hits and 300 bases on balls. He struck out 299. He also was an above-average hitting pitcher during his nine-year MLB career, with a .206 batting average (69-for-335) with 32 runs scored, three home runs and 24 RBIs. During his 12 years in the minors, he won 20 games once and 19 games twice, all in higher-level classifications.

Ed Heusser died from cancer in Aurora, Colorado, at the age of 46.

== See also ==
- List of Major League Baseball annual ERA leaders
