= John Fick =

American baseball player (1921-1958)

- Pitcher
- Born: May 8, 1921; Baltimore, Maryland, US
- Died: June 9, 1958 (aged 37); Somers Point, New Jersey, US
- Batted: Left Threw: Left

MLB debut
- July 29, 1944, for the Philadelphia Phillies

Last MLB appearance
- August 11, 1944, for the Philadelphia Phillies

MLB statistics
- Win–loss record: 0–0
- Earned run average: 3.38
- Strikeouts: 2
- Stats at Baseball Reference

Teams
- Philadelphia Phillies (1944)

John Ralph Fick (May 18, 1921 – June 9, 1958) was a Major League Baseball pitcher. The left-hander appeared in four games for the Philadelphia Phillies in 1944 (July 29 – August 11). The 23-year-old rookie was a native of Baltimore, Maryland, the son of John Fick, a roofer, and Elizabeth.

Fick is one of many ballplayers who only appeared in the major leagues during World War II. He made his major league debut on July 29, 1944 in a home game against the Chicago Cubs at Shibe Park. All four of his appearances were in relief, and he was credited with one game finished. In 5 1/3 innings he gave up just 3 hits, 3 walks, and 2 earned runs. His record was 0–0 with an earned run average of 3.38.

In 1949, Fick married Anna Hlavac at St. Wenceslaus Catholic Church in Baltimore. He died at the age of 37 in Somers Point, New Jersey.
