= Arnold Carter =

American baseball player (1918–1989)

- Born: March 14, 1918; Rainelle, West Virginia, U.S.
- Died: April 12, 1989 (aged 71); Louisville, Kentucky, U.S.
- Batted: Left Threw: Left

MLB debut
- April 29, 1944, for the Cincinnati Reds

Last MLB appearance
- September 26, 1945, for the Cincinnati Reds

MLB statistics
- Win–loss record: 13–11
- Earned run average: 2.72
- Strikeouts: 37
- Stats at Baseball Reference

Teams
- Cincinnati Reds (1944–1945)

Arnold Lee Carter (March 14, 1918 – April 12, 1989) was an American Major League Baseball pitcher who played for the Cincinnati Reds in 1944 and 1945. The 5 ft 10 in (1.78 m), 170 lb (77 kg) left-hander was a native of Rainelle, West Virginia.

== Career ==
Carter is one of many ballplayers who only appeared in the major leagues during World War II. He was a very effective pitcher in his time with Cincinnati. He made his major league debut in relief on April 29, 1944, in a home game against the Pittsburgh Pirates at Crosley Field. His first win came in his first starting assignment, a 4–3 victory in the first game of a doubleheader against the Philadelphia Blue Jays at Shibe Park (May 30). Five days later he pitched his first shutout, a 1–0 win over the Boston Braves at Braves Field, again in the first game of a doubleheader.

In his rookie season Carter was 11–7 and finished in the National League Top Ten for winning percentage, shutouts, and saves. In his second year, he got into just 13 games and was 2–4 with a 3.09 earned run average.

=== Career totals ===
Carter's career totals include a 13–11 record in 46 games, 24 starts, 11 complete games, 4 shutouts, 15 games finished, and 3 saves. His ERA for 195 1/3 innings pitched was 2.72.

== Death ==
Carter died at the age of 71 in Louisville, Kentucky.
