= Deacon Donahue =

American baseball player (1920–2008)

- Pitcher
- Born: June 23, 1920; Chicago, Illinois, U.S.
- Died: March 6, 2008 (aged 87); Glenview, Illinois, U.S.
- Batted: Right Threw: Right

MLB debut
- September 16, 1943, for the Philadelphia Phillies

Last MLB appearance
- May 26, 1944, for the Philadelphia Phillies

MLB statistics
- Win–loss record: 0–2
- Earned run average: 6.75
- Strikeouts: 3
- Stats at Baseball Reference

Teams
- Philadelphia Phillies (1943–1944)

John Stephen Michael "Deacon" Donahue (June 23, 1920 – March 6, 2008) was an American relief pitcher in Major League Baseball who played from 1943 through 1944 for the Philadelphia Phillies. Listed at 6 ft 0 in (1.83 m), 180 lb (82 kg), Donahue batted and threw right-handed. He was born in Chicago, Illinois.

Donahue was one of several players who only appeared in the majors during World War II. In eight relief appearances, he posted a 0–2 record with a 6.75 earned run average with no saves, giving up 11 runs (one unearned) on 22 hits and three walks while striking out three in 13 1/3 innings of work.

Following his baseball career, Donahue worked as a movie theatre projectionist in the Chicago area for 40 years. He died in Glenview, Illinois, at the age of 87.
