= Barney Mussill =

American baseball player (1919-2013)

- Pitcher
- Born: October 1, 1919; Bower Hill, Pennsylvania, U.S.
- Died: January 27, 2013 (aged 93); Detroit, Michigan, U.S.
- Batted: Right Threw: Left

MLB debut
- April 20, 1944, for the Philadelphia Phillies

Last MLB appearance
- July 26, 1944, for the Philadelphia Phillies

MLB statistics
- Win–loss record: 0–1
- Earned run average: 6.05
- Strikeouts: 5
- Stats at Baseball Reference

Teams
- Philadelphia Phillies (1944)

Bernard James Mussill (October 1, 1919 – January 27, 2013) was an American former Major League Baseball pitcher who played for the Philadelphia Phillies in 1944. The rookie left-hander stood 6 ft 1 in (1.85 m) and weighed 200 lb (91 kg).

== Biography ==
Born in Bower Hill, Pennsylvania, Mussill was one of many ballplayers who only appeared in the major leagues during World War II. He made his major league debut on April 20, 1944, in a home game against the Brooklyn Dodgers at Shibe Park.

His season and career totals included sixteen games pitched, all in relief, a 0–1 record with eight games finished, thirteen earned runs allowed in 19 1/3 innings, and an ERA of 6.05.
