= Ken Raffensberger =

American baseball player (1917–2002)

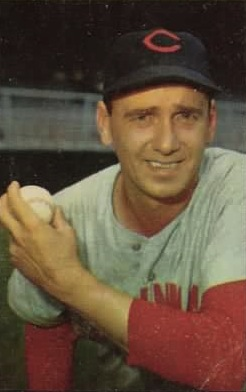
- Raffensberger, c. 1953
- Pitcher
- Born: August 8, 1917; York, Pennsylvania, U.S.
- Died: November 10, 2002 (aged 85); York, Pennsylvania, U.S.
- Batted: Right Threw: Left

MLB debut
- April 25, 1939, for the St. Louis Cardinals

Last MLB appearance
- June 2, 1954, for the Cincinnati Redlegs

MLB statistics
- Win–loss record: 119–154
- Earned run average: 3.60
- Strikeouts: 806
- Stats at Baseball Reference

Teams
- St. Louis Cardinals (1939); Chicago Cubs (1940–1941); Philadelphia Phillies (1943–1947); Cincinnati Reds / Redlegs (1947–1954)

Career highlights and awards
- All-Star (1944)

Kenneth David Raffensberger (August 8, 1917 – November 10, 2002) was an American starting pitcher in Major League Baseball (MLB). From 1939 through 1954, he played for the St. Louis Cardinals (1939), Chicago Cubs (1940–41), Philadelphia Phillies (1943–47), and Cincinnati Reds/Redlegs (1947–54). Raffensberger batted right-handed and threw left-handed.

== Career ==
In a 15-season big league career, Raffensberger posted a win–loss record of 119–154 with 806 strikeouts and a 3.60 earned run average (ERA) in 2,151 2/3 innings pitched. His career winning percentage was .463, despite being an all-star and having an above average career ERA (3.60).

Raffensberger started his career as a fastball pitcher, particularly gaining success with his rising fastball. However, further along in his career (beginning in the early 1940s), he developed an arsenal of additional pitches to complement his fastball: a dependable forkball, a slow curveball, and a changeup. Raffensberger had one of the widest ranges of deliveries in the major leagues, ranging from underhand to overhand and a variety of sidearm and three-quarter deliveries in between.

On November 10, 2002, Raffensberger died in his native York, Pennsylvania, at the age of 85.

== Achievements ==
- Made National League All-Star team (1944)
- Twice led NL in shutouts (1949, five – 1952, six)
- Led NL in games started (1949, 38)
- Led NL in saves (1946, six)
- Led NL in WHIP (1951, 1.086)
- Led NL in SO to Walk (1944, 3.02)
- 3-time appeared in National League MVP vote (1949, 1951–52)
- Twice led NL in losses (1944, 20 – 1951, 17)
- Led NL in home runs allowed (1950, 34)
- Led NL in hits allowed (1949, 289)

== See also ==
- List of Major League Baseball annual saves leaders

== Sources ==
- Baseball Almanac
- "Former Reds' pitcher dies at 85". The Cincinnati Post. November 11, 2002. Archived from the original on February 17, 2005.
