= Dick Barrett (baseball) =

American baseball player (1906–1966)

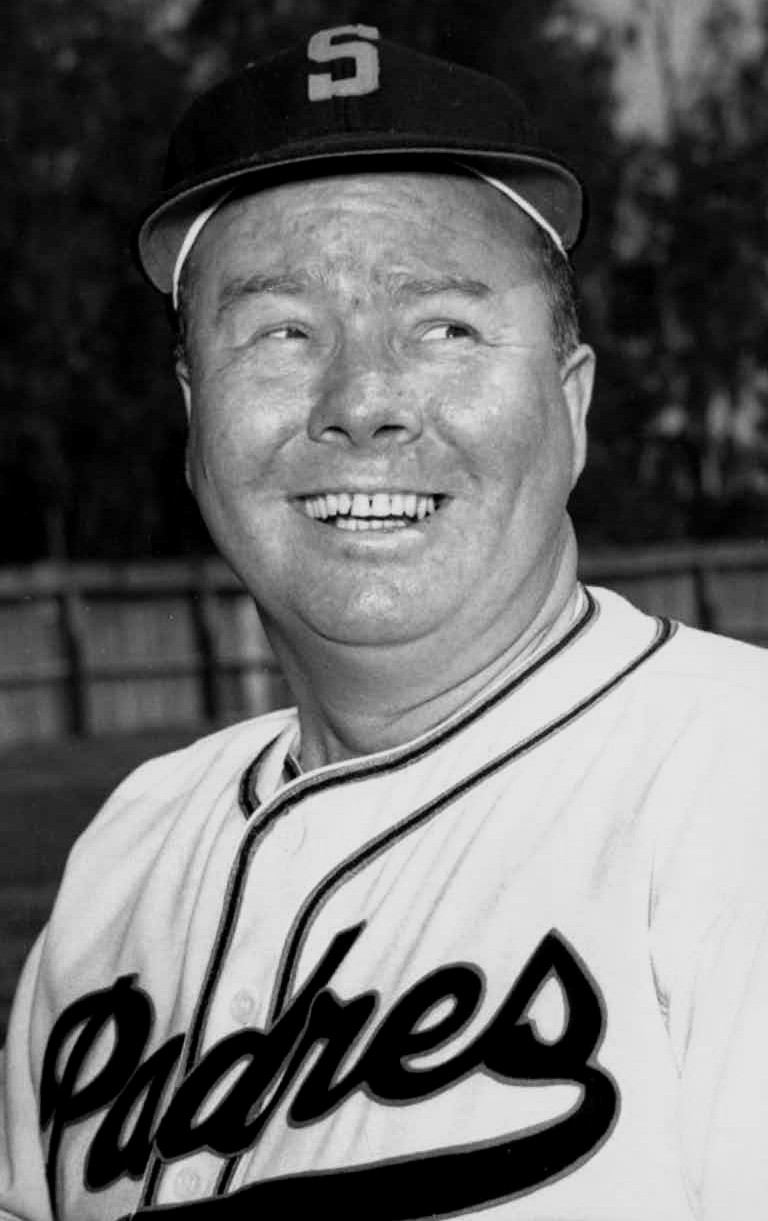
- Pitcher
- Born: September 28, 1906; Montoursville, Pennsylvania, U.S.
- Died: October 30, 1966 (aged 60); Seattle, Washington, U.S.
- Batted: Right Threw: Right

MLB debut
- June 27, 1933, for the Philadelphia Athletics

Last MLB appearance
- September 30, 1945, for the Philadelphia Phillies

MLB statistics
- Win–loss record: 35–58
- Earned run average: 4.28
- Strikeouts: 271
- Stats at Baseball Reference

Teams
- Philadelphia Athletics (1933); Boston Braves (1934); Chicago Cubs (1943); Philadelphia Phillies (1943–1945)

Tracy Scouter "Dick" Barrett (September 28, 1906 – October 30, 1966) was an American professional baseball pitcher. He played in Major League Baseball (MLB) for the Philadelphia Athletics, Boston Braves, Chicago Cubs, and Philadelphia Phillies. A native of Montoursville, Pennsylvania, he attended University of Illinois at Urbana-Champaign.

== Biography ==
Barrett had a very long minor league career, spanning 21 seasons from 1926 to 1953. He played for many minor teams during that time:

- Williamsport Grays (1925, 1926)
- Scottdale Scotties (1926, 1927)
- Albany Senators (1928, 1929, 1934)
- Binghampton Triplets (1928)
- Jersey City Skeeters (1929, 1930)
- Wilkes-Barre Barons (1929, 1930, 1931)
- Chambersburg Young Yanks (1929)
- Elmira Colonels (1931)
- Elmira Red Wings (1932)
- Houston Buffaloes (1932)
- Seattle Indians (1935,1936, 1937, 1938, 1939, 1949, 1941, 1942)
- Portland Beavers (1946)
- Seattle Raniers (1947, 1948, 1949)
- San Diego Padres (1949, 1950)
- Hollywood Stars (1950)
- Victoria Athletics (1951)
- Yakima Bears (1951)
- Vancouver Capilanos (1953)

For his minor-league contributions, Barrett was inducted in the Pacific Coast League Hall of Fame in 2016.

In a five-season major league career, Barrett posted a 35–58 record with 271 strikeouts and a 4.28 ERA in 141 appearances, including 91 starts, 32 complete games, three shutouts, two saves, and 729 innings of work. In the minor leagues, Barrett won 325 games in a 24-season career.
