= Nick Goulish =

American baseball player (1916-1984)

- Outfielder
- Born: November 13, 1916; Punxsutawney, Pennsylvania, U.S.
- Died: May 15, 1984 (aged 67); Youngstown, Ohio, U.S.
- Batted: Left Threw: Left

MLB debut
- April 19, 1944, for the Philadelphia Phillies

Last MLB appearance
- May 26, 1945, for the Philadelphia Phillies

MLB statistics
- Batting average: .250
- Home runs: 0
- Runs batted in: 2
- Stats at Baseball Reference

Teams
- Philadelphia Phillies (1944–1945)

Nicholas Edward Goulish (November 3, 1916 - May 15, 1984) was an American Major League Baseball outfielder. He played parts of two seasons in the majors, 1944 and 1945, for the Philadelphia Phillies. He only played two games in the outfield, while appearing in eleven games as a pinch hitter and one as a pinch runner.

== Sources ==
- Career statistics from Baseball Reference · Baseball Reference (Minors) · Retrosheet · Baseball Almanac
