= Andy Karl (baseball) =

American baseball player (1914–1989)

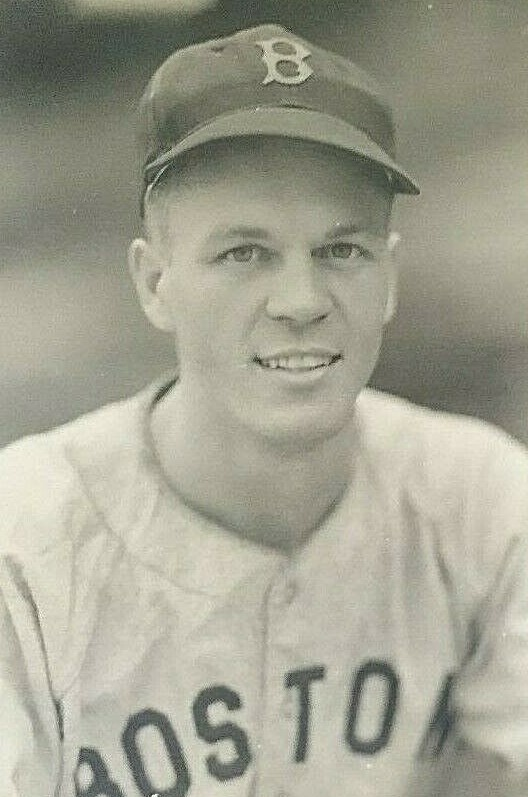
- Pitcher
- Born: April 8, 1914; Mount Vernon, New York, U.S.
- Died: April 8, 1989 (aged 75); La Jolla, California, U.S.
- Batted: Right Threw: Right

MLB debut
- April 24, 1943, for the Boston Red Sox

Last MLB appearance
- August 20, 1947, for the Boston Braves

MLB statistics
- Win–loss record: 18–23
- Earned run average: 3.51
- Strikeouts: 107
- Stats at Baseball Reference

Teams
- Boston Red Sox (1943); Philadelphia Phillies (1943–1946); Boston Braves (1947)

Anton Andrew Karl (April 8, 1914 – April 8, 1989) was an American professional baseball player. He was a right-handed pitcher over parts of five seasons (1943–47) with the Boston Red Sox, Philadelphia Phillies and Boston Braves. For his career, he compiled an 18–23 record in 191 appearances, all but four as a relief pitcher, with a 3.51 earned run average and 107 strikeouts.

Karl attended A.B. Davis High School and earned a degree in industrial engineering from Manhattan College where he played college baseball and basketball for the Jaspers. He married the former Myra McBride and had at least two children with her.

Karl was born in Mount Vernon, New York and later died in La Jolla, California on his 75th birthday.

== See also ==
- List of Major League Baseball annual saves leaders
