= Ripple Island =

Ripple Island may refer to:

- Ripple Island (Minnesota), an island in Shagawa Lake, Minnesota, United States
- Ripple Island (Washington), an island in the San Juan Islands, Washington, United States
- Ripple Island (video game), a 1988 video game developed by Sunsoft
