= Nate Andrews =

American baseball player (1913–1991)

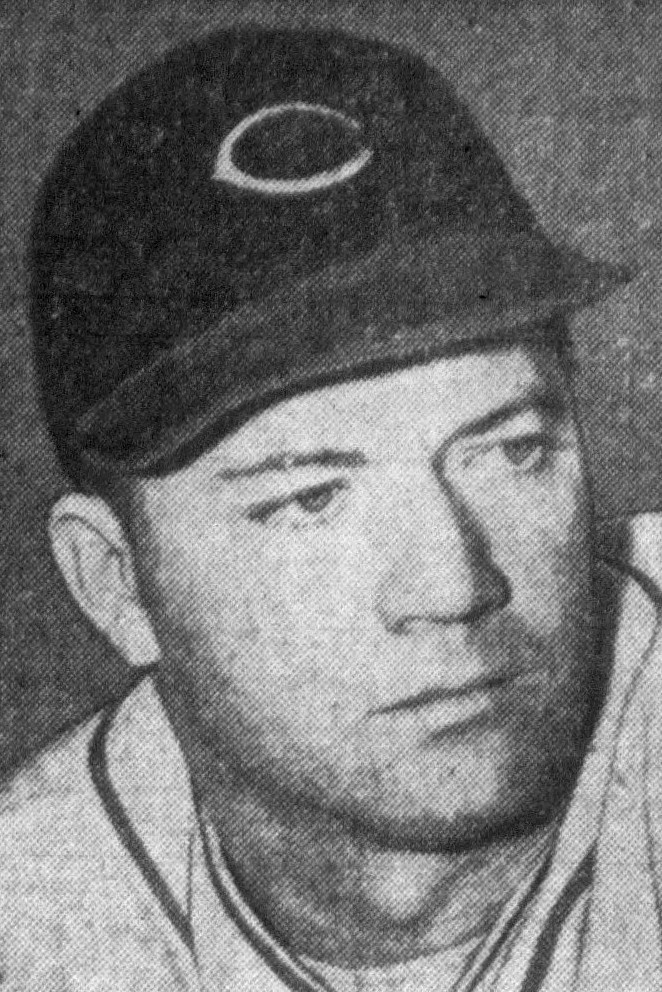
- Andrews, circa 1942
- Pitcher
- Born: September 30, 1913; Pembroke, North Carolina, U.S.
- Died: April 26, 1991 (aged 77); Winston-Salem, North Carolina, U.S.
- Batted: Right Threw: Right

MLB debut
- May 1, 1937, for the St. Louis Cardinals

Last MLB appearance
- June 23, 1946, for the New York Giants

MLB statistics
- Win–loss record: 41–54
- Earned run average: 3.46
- Strikeouts: 216
- Stats at Baseball Reference

Teams
- St. Louis Cardinals (1937, 1939); Cleveland Indians (1940–1941); Boston Braves (1943–1945); Cincinnati Reds (1946); New York Giants (1946)

Career highlights and awards
- All-Star (1944)

Nathan Hardy Andrews (September 30, 1913 – April 26, 1991) was an American pitcher in Major League Baseball who played for the St. Louis Cardinals (1937, 1939), Cleveland Indians (1940–41), Boston Braves (1943–45), Cincinnati Reds (1946) and New York Giants (1946). Andrews batted and threw right-handed. He was born in Robeson County, North Carolina.

== Early life ==
Andrews attended Rowland High School in Rowland, North Carolina. He began his college baseball career at Presbyterian Junior College, before moving to the University of North Carolina.

== Professional career ==
Andrews pitched for five Major League teams in a span of eight seasons. After he led the National League with 20 losses in 1943, he won a career-high 16 games in 1944 and was also selected for the All-Star Game. In his career, he posted a 41–54 record with 216 strikeouts and a 3.46 earned run average in 773 1/3 innings pitched, including five shutouts and 50 complete games.

== Personal life ==
On April 26, 1991, Andrews died in Winston-Salem, North Carolina, at age 77.
