= Al Jurisich =

American baseball player (1921–1981)

- Pitcher
- Born: August 25, 1921; New Orleans, Louisiana, U.S.
- Died: November 3, 1981 (aged 60); New Orleans, Louisiana, U.S.
- Batted: Right Threw: Right

MLB debut
- April 26, 1944, for the St. Louis Cardinals

Last MLB appearance
- September 21, 1947, for the Philadelphia Phillies

MLB statistics
- Win–loss record: 15–22
- Earned run average: 4.24
- Strikeouts: 177
- Stats at Baseball Reference

Teams
- St. Louis Cardinals (1944–1945); Philadelphia Phillies (1946–1947)

Career highlights and awards
- World Series champion (1944)

Alvin Joseph Jurisich (August 25, 1921 – November 3, 1981) was an American professional baseball player of Croat descent. A right-handed pitcher, the native of New Orleans, appeared in 104 games in Major League Baseball between 1944 and 1947 for the St. Louis Cardinals and Philadelphia Phillies. He stood 6 feet 2 inches (1.88 m) tall and weighed 193 pounds (88 kg).

Jurisich appeared in one contest as a relief pitcher in the "All-St. Louis" 1944 World Series, won by his Cardinals in six games over the St. Louis Browns. He entered Game 3 in the bottom of the seventh inning with the Cardinals trailing, 4–2. He gave up two hits, doubles to Don Gutteridge and George McQuinn, and was charged with two earned runs in two-thirds of an inning. The Browns would win the game, 6–2.

Jurisich was mainly a relief pitcher in the Majors, but he did make 42 starts in his 104 appearances and notched 13 complete games. He gave up 344 hits in 388 1/3 innings pitched, and issued 189 bases on balls. He had 177 strikeouts and five saves.
