= Freddy Schmidt =

American baseball player (1916–2012)

- Pitcher
- Born: February 9, 1916; Hartford, Connecticut, U.S.
- Died: November 17, 2012 (aged 96); Muhlenberg, Pennsylvania, U.S.
- Batted: Right Threw: Right

MLB debut
- April 25, 1944, for the St. Louis Cardinals

Last MLB appearance
- September 24, 1947, for the Chicago Cubs

MLB statistics
- Win–loss record: 13–11
- Earned run average: 3.75
- Strikeouts: 98
- Stats at Baseball Reference

Teams
- St. Louis Cardinals (1944, 1946–1947); Philadelphia Phillies (1947); Chicago Cubs (1947)

Frederick Albert Schmidt (February 9, 1916 – November 17, 2012) was an American pitcher in Major League Baseball who played for three different National League teams between 1944 and 1947. He was born in Hartford, Connecticut. Listed at 6 ft 1 in (1.85 m), 185 lb (84 kg), he batted and threw right-handed.

Schmidt entered the majors in 1944 with the St. Louis Cardinals, playing for them one year before joining military service during World War II. In his rookie season, Schmidt went 7–3 with a 3.15 earned run average, two shutouts, and five saves to help his team to clinch the National League pennant. He also pitched 3.1 scoreless innings of relief in Game 3 of the 1944 World Series, won by the Cardinals over the St. Louis Browns in six games.

After his discharge, Schmidt rejoined St. Louis in 1946 but he was not the same after that. He divided his playing time with the Cardinals, Phillies and Cubs in 1947, his last major league season.

In a three-season career, Schmidt posted a 13–11 record with 98 strikeouts and a 3.75 ERA in 85 appearances, including 15 starts, three complete games, two shutouts, five saves, and 225.1 innings.

A resident of Wind Gap, Pennsylvania from 1994 until his death, Schmidt continued to attend Philadelphia Phillies alumni events all the way until August 2012. Schmidt died at Lehigh Valley Hospital in Muhlenberg Township on November 17, 2012 at age 96. At the time of his death, he was the fourth oldest-living major league player and believed to be the oldest active World Series champion. He would have a military funeral.
