= Blix Donnelly =

American baseball player (1914–1976)

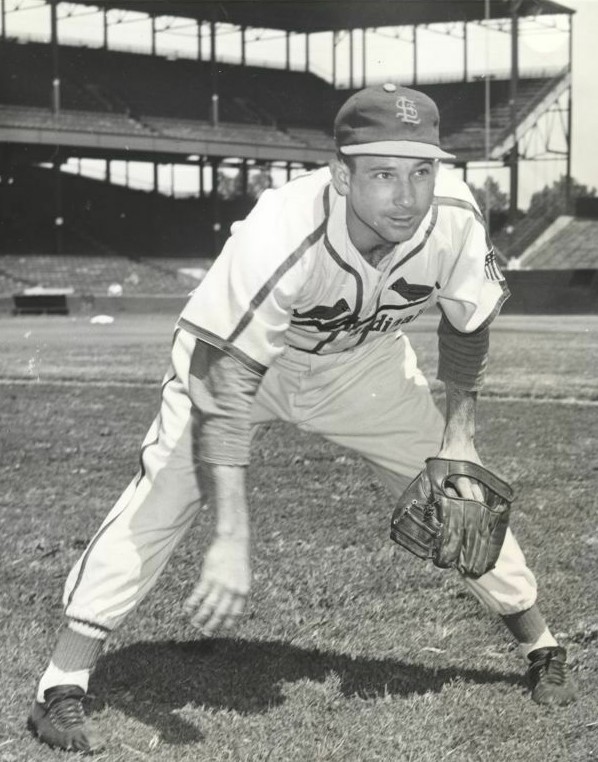
- Pitcher
- Born: January 21, 1914; Olivia, Minnesota, U.S.
- Died: June 20, 1976 (aged 62); Olivia, Minnesota, U.S.
- Batted: Right Threw: Right

MLB debut
- May 6, 1944, for the St. Louis Cardinals

Last MLB appearance
- May 3, 1951, for the Boston Braves

MLB statistics
- Win–loss record: 27–36
- Earned run average: 3.49
- Strikeouts: 296
- Stats at Baseball Reference

Teams
- St. Louis Cardinals (1944–1946); Philadelphia Phillies (1946–1950); Boston Braves (1951)

Career highlights and awards
- World Series champion (1944)

Sylvester Urban "Blix" Donnelly (January 21, 1914 – June 20, 1976) was an American professional baseball pitcher. A right-hander, Donnelly appeared in 190 Major League Baseball (MLB) games between 1944 and 1951 for the St. Louis Cardinals, Philadelphia Phillies and Boston Braves. In all, he had an 18-year (1935–1952) professional career. Donnelly stood 5 feet 10 inches (1.78 m) tall and weighed 166 pounds (75 kg).

A lifelong resident of Olivia, Minnesota, Donnelly spent nine seasons in minor league baseball; in 1941, he had 28 wins and 304 strikeouts for the Class C Springfield Cardinals of the Western Association. Donnelly was promoted to the Major Leagues and the St. Louis Cardinals as a 30-year-old rookie in 1944. In 27 games, four as a starting pitcher, he posted a career-best 2.12 earned run average (ERA), won two of three decisions, and collected four saves as the Redbirds won their third successive National League (NL) championship.

Donnelly then turned in two outstanding performances in relief in the "All-St. Louis" 1944 World Series. In his first outing, in Game 1, he retired all six St. Louis Browns to face him, but the Browns held on for a 2–1 triumph. Then, in Game 2, Donnelly relieved starting pitcher Max Lanier in the eighth inning of a 2–2 tie. Donnelly worked four scoreless frames, allowing two hits and one base on balls while striking out seven, and was the winning pitcher when pinch hitter Ken O'Dea drove home the winning run in the bottom of the 11th inning. The Cardinals went on to win the World Series over the Browns in six games.

Donnelly was sent to the Phillies in 1946 and spent 4 1/2 seasons with them, appearing in 113 games as both a starter and reliever. He was a member of the 1950 "Whiz Kids" edition that won the NL pennant; however, at age 36, Donnelly was one of the older players on the squad and did not appear in the 1950 World Series.

Donnelly's MLB career stat line includes 659 hits allowed in 691 2/3 innings pitched, with 306 bases on balls, and 296 strikeouts. He recorded 27 complete games as a starter and 12 saves as a reliever.

Donnelly spent his retirement from baseball working in the anhydrous ammonia industry, retiring from that in 1973. Donnelly died of cancer in his hometown of Olivia, Minnesota on June 20, 1976.
