= Al Verdel =

American baseball player (1921-1991)

- Pitcher
- Born: June 10, 1921; Punxsutawney, Pennsylvania, U.S.
- Died: April 16, 1991 (aged 69); Sarasota, Florida, U.S.
- Batted: Right Threw: Right

MLB debut
- April 20, 1944, for the Philadelphia Phillies

Last MLB appearance
- April 20, 1944, for the Philadelphia Phillies

MLB statistics
- Win–loss record: 0–0
- Earned run average: 0.00
- Strikeouts: 0
- Stats at Baseball Reference

Teams
- Philadelphia Phillies (1944)

Albert Alfred Verdel (June 10, 1921 – April 16, 1991), nicknamed "Stumpy", was an American Major League Baseball pitcher. The 23-year-old, rookie, right-hander appeared in one game for the Philadelphia Phillies in 1944.

== Biography ==
Born in Punxsutawney, Pennsylvania, Verdel resided in the Trenton, New Jersey, and Bordentown, New Jersey, areas for most of his life before retiring to Sarasota, Florida.

After his playing career, he coached baseball and football at Bordentown Military Institute and Football at Notre Dame High School in Lawrenceville, New Jersey. During his coaching career, he had the opportunity to coach athletes who went on to play MLB (Chris Short and Lee Elia, who were also with the Phillies organization) and the NFL (Floyd Little). He also continued his affiliation with the Phillies organization as a field representative.

Verdel is one of many ballplayers who only appeared in the major leagues during World War II. His only major league action came on April 20, 1944, in a home game against the Brooklyn Dodgers at Shibe Park. He entered the game in the top of the ninth and hurled one perfect inning of relief in the 8–2 loss. His lifetime earned run average stands at 0.00.

Verdel died at the age of sixty-nine in Sarasota, Florida.
