= Bud Byerly =

American baseball player (1919–2012)

- Pitcher
- Born: October 26, 1919; Webster Groves, Missouri, U.S.
- Died: January 26, 2012 (aged 92); St. Louis, Missouri, U.S.
- Batted: Right Threw: Right

MLB debut
- September 26, 1943, for the St. Louis Cardinals

Last MLB appearance
- July 21, 1960, for the San Francisco Giants

MLB statistics
- Win–loss record: 22–22
- Earned run average: 3.70
- Strikeouts: 209
- Stats at Baseball Reference

Teams
- St. Louis Cardinals (1943–1945); Cincinnati Reds (1950–1952); Washington Senators (1956–1958); Boston Red Sox (1958); San Francisco Giants (1959–1960)

Career highlights and awards
- World Series champion (1944)

Eldred William "Bud" Byerly (October 26, 1919 – January 26, 2012) was an American professional baseball pitcher, who played for the St. Louis Cardinals, Cincinnati Reds, Washington Senators, Boston Red Sox and San Francisco Giants of Major League Baseball (MLB). The right-hander, a native of Webster Groves, Missouri, was listed as 6 feet 2 inches (1.88 m) tall and 185 pounds (84 kg).

Although he never pitched more than 95 innings in a regular season, Byerly played for five Major League teams in a span of 17 years (1944–60). In 1957 while with the Senators, Byerly posted career-highs with six wins and six saves.

In his 11-season major league career, Byerly had a 22–22 record with a 3.70 ERA and 14 saves in 237 appearances. In 4912/3 innings pitched, he allowed 519 hits and 167 bases on balls, with 209 strikeouts.
