= Charlie Ripple =

American baseball player (1920–1979)

- Pitcher
- Born: December 1, 1920; Bolton, North Carolina, U.S.
- Died: May 6, 1979 (aged 58); Wilmington, North Carolina, U.S.
- Batted: Left Threw: Left

MLB debut
- September 25, 1944, for the Philadelphia Phillies

Last MLB appearance
- June 28, 1946, for the Philadelphia Phillies

MLB statistics
- Win–loss record: 1–1
- Earned run average: 9.45
- Strikeouts: 10
- Stats at Baseball Reference

Teams
- Philadelphia Phillies (1944–1946)

Charles Dawson Ripple (December 1, 1920 – May 6, 1979) was a pitcher in Major League Baseball. He played for the Philadelphia Phillies.
