= Ben Chapman (baseball) =

American baseball player and coach (1908–1993)

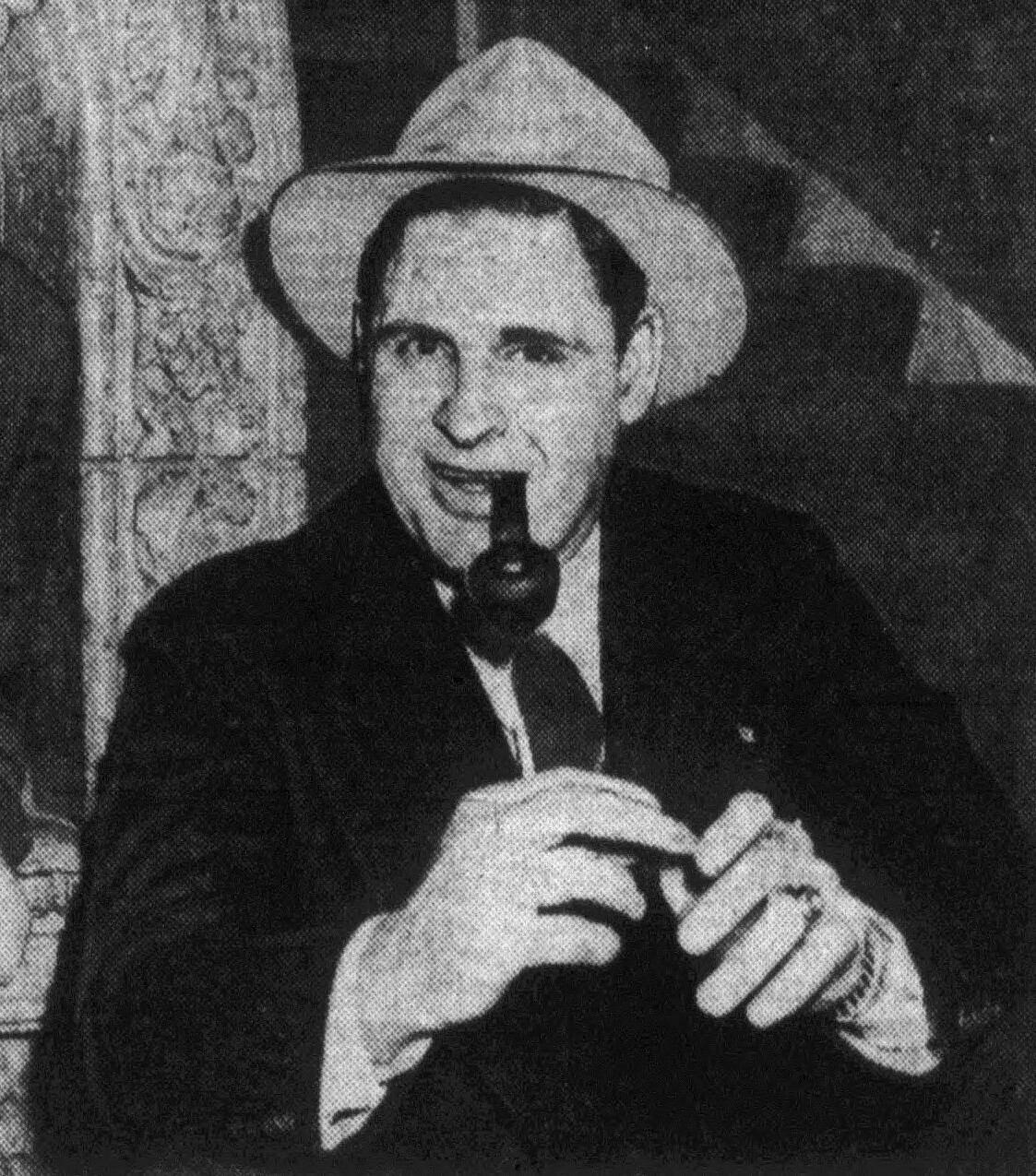
- Chapman, circa 1946
- Outfielder / Manager
- Born: December 25, 1908; Nashville, Tennessee, U.S.
- Died: July 7, 1993 (aged 84); Hoover, Alabama, U.S.
- Batted: Right Threw: Right

MLB debut
- April 15, 1930, for the New York Yankees

Last MLB appearance
- May 12, 1946, for the Philadelphia Phillies

MLB statistics
- Batting average: .302
- Home runs: 90
- Runs batted in: 977
- Managerial record: 196–276
- Winning %: .415
- Stats at Baseball Reference

Teams
- As player: New York Yankees (1930–1936); Washington Senators (1936–1937); Boston Red Sox (1937–1938); Cleveland Indians (1939–1940); Washington Senators (1941); Chicago White Sox (1941); Brooklyn Dodgers (1944–1945); Philadelphia Phillies (1945–1946); As manager: Philadelphia Phillies (1945–1948)

Career highlights and awards
- 4× All-Star (1933–1936); World Series champion (1932); 4× AL stolen base leader (1931–1933, 1937)

William Benjamin Chapman (December 25, 1908 – July 7, 1993) was an American professional baseball player and manager. He played in Major League Baseball as an outfielder from 1930 to 1946, most prominently as a member of the New York Yankees, where he was a four-time All-Star player and was a member of the 1932 World Series winning team.

During the period from 1926 to 1943, Chapman had more stolen bases than any other player, leading the American League (AL) four times. After 12 seasons, during which he batted .302 and led the AL in assists and double plays twice each, he spent two years in the minor leagues and returned to the majors as a National League pitcher for three seasons, becoming player-manager of the Philadelphia Phillies, his final team.

Chapman's accomplishments as a player were overshadowed by the role he played in 1947 as manager of the Phillies, antagonizing Jackie Robinson by shouting racist epithets and opposing his presence on a major league team on the basis of Robinson's race with unsportsmanlike conduct that was an embarrassment for his team. Chapman was fired the following season and never managed in the majors again.

== Playing career ==
Born in Nashville, Tennessee, in 1908, Chapman batted and threw right-handed. He was a teammate of Babe Ruth, Lou Gehrig, Joe DiMaggio, and other stars on the Yankees from 1930 through the middle of the 1936 season. In his 1930 rookie season with the Yankees, during which he batted .316, Chapman played exclusively in the infield as a second and third baseman. Although he played only 91 games at third, he led the AL in errors, and after Joe Sewell was acquired in the offseason, Chapman was shifted to the outfield to take advantage of his speed and throwing arm.

Chapman's batting average dipped one point in 1931, but he hit a career-high 17 home runs along with 122 runs batted in and 61 stolen bases. His 1931 total of 61 stolen bases was the highest by a Yankee since Fritz Maisel's 74 in 1914, and was the most by any major leaguer between 1921 and 1961 (equalled only by George Case in 1943). He was the first player with 100 or more runs batted in and 60 or more stolen bases in a season since the end of the Dead-ball era. Joe Morgan (1976) and Ronald Acuña Jr. (2023) are the only other players to accomplish the feat during the Live-ball era. He led the AL in stolen bases for the next three seasons (1931–33),

With the Yankees, Chapman also batted over .300 and scored 100 runs four times each, drove in 100 runs twice, led the AL in triples in 1934, and made each of the first three AL All-Star teams from 1933 to 1935, leading off in the 1933 game as the first AL hitter in All-Star history. In one game on July 9, 1932, Chapman hit three home runs, two of which were inside-the-park. In the 1932 World Series, he batted .294 with six runs batted in as the Yankees swept the Chicago Cubs.

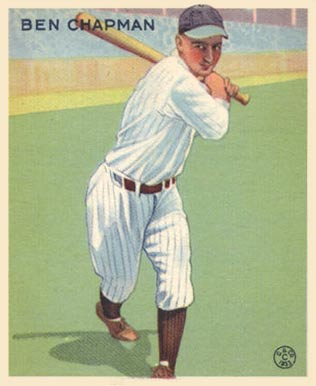
Chapman depicted on a 1933 Goudey card

It was in New York that the extent of Chapman's bigotry first surfaced. He taunted Jewish fans at Yankee Stadium with Nazi salutes and disparaging epithets. In a 1933 game, his intentional spiking of Washington Senators' second baseman Buddy Myer (who was believed to be Jewish) caused a 20-minute brawl that saw 300 fans participate and resulted in five-game suspensions and $100 fines for each of the players involved.

In June 1936, Chapman – then hitting .266 and expendable with the arrival of DiMaggio – was traded to the Senators. The player the Yankees received in return was Jake Powell, who would become infamous for a 1938 radio interview in which he stated that he liked to crack Blacks over the head with his nightstick as a police officer during the off-season. Despite his own opposition to integrating the game, baseball commissioner Kenesaw Mountain Landis suspended Powell for 10 days.

Chapman rebounded following the trade to finish the year with a .315 average, again making the All-Star team, scoring 100 runs and collecting a career-high 50 doubles. The Senators sent him to the Boston Red Sox in June 1937, and that season he led the AL in steals for the fourth time with 35. The following year, he hit a career-best .340 with Boston, after which he was traded to the Cleveland Indians. After two seasons in which he hit .290 and .286, Cleveland sent Chapman back to Washington in December 1940. He hit .255 in his return to the Senators before they released him in May 1941. The Chicago White Sox then picked him up, but after he batted only .226 over the remainder of the year, his major league career appeared to be finished.

== Managerial career ==
After managing in the Class B Piedmont League in 1942 and 1944 – he was suspended for the 1943 season for punching an umpire – Chapman resurfaced as a pitcher in the National League with the Brooklyn Dodgers in 1944, earning five wins against three losses. After starting the next year 3–3, he was traded to the Phillies on June 15, 1945, becoming player-manager on June 30. He made three relief appearances for the team that year, played his final game in 1946 with 1 1/3 innings of relief, and continued as a non-playing manager. He appeared in 1,717 games over 15 seasons, batting .302 lifetime with 1,958 hits, 407 doubles, 107 triples, 90 home runs, 824 walks, 1,144 runs, 977 runs batted in, and 287 stolen bases, and winning eight of 14 decisions as a pitcher; his 184 steals with the Yankees placed him second in team history behind Hal Chase.

If Chapman disliked Jews, and he did dislike Jews, then he hated "nigras." As the Dodgers-Phillies game began, Chapman's strong, carrying drawl rose from the visiting dugout. "Hey you, there. Snowflake. Yeah, you. You heah me. When did they let you outa the jungle... Hey, we doan need no niggers here... Hey, black boy. You like white poontang, black boy? You like white pussy? Which one o' the white boys' wives are you fucking tonight?"

— Roger Kahn, The Era

Chapman had replaced Freddie Fitzsimmons as manager of the Phillies in 1945 with that team buried in last place (winner of only 17 of 68 games). The team improved somewhat through the end of the year. Chapman retired as a player after the 1945 season, but stayed on as manager. The Phillies climbed to fifth place in 1946, the first year of the postwar baseball boom and the last season in which the color line was in effect. In April 1947, Brooklyn called up Jackie Robinson from the Montreal Royals and made him their regular first baseman. Chapman's Phillies were not the only NL team to oppose racial integration – several Dodger players tried to petition management to keep him off the team – but during an early-season series in Brooklyn, the level of verbal abuse directed by Chapman and his players at Robinson reached such proportions that it made headlines in the New York and national press. Chapman instructed his pitchers, whenever they had a 3–0 count against Robinson, to bean him rather than walk him.

== Jackie Robinson game - April 22, 1947 ==
On April 22, 1947, with Chapman as manager, the Philadelphia Phillies played the newly racially integrated Brooklyn Dodgers and Jackie Robinson at Ebbets Field. During the game, Chapman immediately took to hurling vicious racial epithets towards Robinson. Aside from the racial name calling of "Snowflake" and "Nigger", Chapman also taunted Robinson with lusting after and sleeping with the white players' wives. Harold Parrott, the Dodgers’ traveling secretary recalled that "Chapman mentioned everything from thick lips to the supposedly extra-thick Negro skull" and that Robinson's teammates "would become infected with if they touched the towels or the combs he used." The taunting and abuse became so bad that Phillies third baseman Lee Handley, upon reaching base, apologized to Robinson, telling him that not all the Phillies players felt the same. He told Robinson that some were only going along with it as they had been told by "management" to act that way.

Many fans in attendance that day wrote to baseball commissioner Happy Chandler, demanding that Chapman be disciplined by the league. Chapman's comments were thusly published in the May 3 issue of the Pittsburgh Courier. Then on May 4, syndicated columnist and radio host Walter Winchell called for Chapman to "be thrown out of baseball." On May 5, Commissioner Chandler issued an order restraining the Phillies from using "vicious un-American racial remarks" against Robinson.

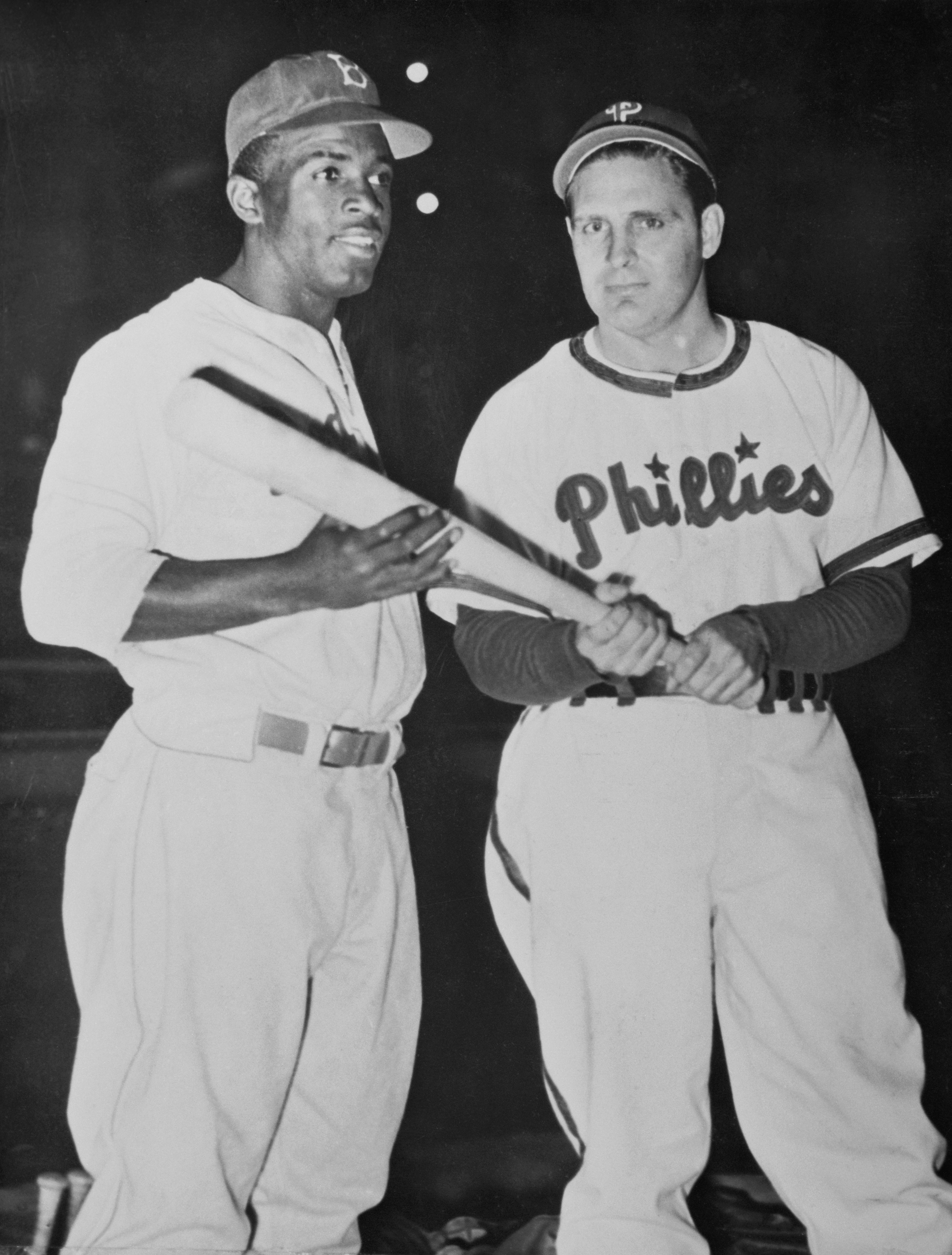
Chapman posing in a photograph with Robinson during an attempt of reconciliation in 1947

On May 10, with the Phillies and Dodgers again playing each other, this time in Philadelphia, as a means of easing tensions, Robinson and Chapman posed together for a picture. Chapman himself initially stated that the picture was his idea, but then later stated that it had come from Phillies management. Regardless, Robinson's teammate (and Chapman's former teammate) Dixie Walker stated, "I never thought I'd see old Ben eat shit like that." In his own memoir, Robinson noted, "I can think of no occasion where I had more difficulty in swallowing my pride and doing what seemed best for baseball and the cause of the Negro in baseball than in agreeing to pose for a photograph with a man for whom I had only the very lowest regard".

Chapman would insist through the rest of his life that his comments to Robinson were gamesmanship and indeed no different than how non-black players were treated - citing that players like Joe DiMaggio, who was Italian, were openly called a "dago" and Hank Greenberg, who was Jewish, a "kike". Sportswriter and author Allen Barra, said he interviewed Chapman "three or four times" beginning in 1979, and Chapman's story varied little. In an interview with journalist Ray Robinson in 1992, Chapman, although never directly apologizing, stated, "A man learns about things and mellows as he grows older. I think that maybe I've changed a bit. Maybe I went too far in those days. But I always went along with the bench jockeying, which has always been part of the game. Maybe I was rougher at it than some other players. I thought that you could use it to upset and weaken the other team. It might give you an advantage. The world changes." Reflecting on the success of his son, then coaching black players on an integrated football team, "Look, I'm real proud I've raised my son different. And he gets along well with them. They like him. That's a nice thing, don't you think?"

Reflecting on a June 6, 1972, episode of the Dick Cavett Show, Robinson stated that, "Ben Chapman was perhaps the most vicious of any of the people in terms of name calling....he was quite vicious...wasn't only vicious as far as black people are concerned. I think he was anti-everything."

== Managerial record ==
Team	Year	Regular season					Postseason			
Team	Year	Games	Won	Lost	Win %	Finish	Won	Lost	Win %	Result
PHI	1945	85	28	57	.329	8th in NL	–	–	–	–
PHI	1946	155	69	85	.448	5th in NL	–	–	–	–
PHI	1947	155	62	92	.403	8th in NL	–	–	–	–
PHI	1948	79	37	42	.468	(fired)	–	–	–	–
Total		474	196	276	.415		–	–	–	–

== Personal life ==
Chapman's first wife, Mary Elizabeth Payne, divorced Chapman on June 11, 1935, getting the divorce in Birmingham, Alabama. In the divorce petition, Payne charged Chapman with domestic violence.

Chapman later worked in insurance in Alabama. He was a consultant on Iron Horse: Lou Gehrig in His Time, Ray Robinson's 1990 biography of Lou Gehrig.

In 1993, Chapman died of a heart attack at age 84 at his home in Hoover, Alabama. He was interred at Birmingham's Elmwood Cemetery.

== In popular culture ==
The newspaper headline "Red Sox beat Yanks 5–4 on Chapman's Homer", a possibly intentional pun on the title of John Keats' poem "On First Looking into Chapman's Homer", is mentioned in Vladimir Nabokov's 1962 novel Pale Fire (lines 97–98), where it is misinterpreted by the character Charles Kinbote. Sources disagree on whether the headline is genuine or not.

In Harry Turtledove's 2003 alternate history novel Southern Victory: American Empire: The Victorious Opposition, one of the Freedom Party Guards appears to be Chapman.

In the 2013 film 42, Chapman is played by Alan Tudyk and is portrayed as an antagonist in the film.

In season 25, episode 17 of The Simpsons, Homer compares Marge to “being that racist Philadelphia manager” due to her not supporting him wanting to become a competitive eater due to his prior heart problems (comparing himself to Jackie Robinson), to which Marge replied “quit comparing me to Ben Chapman” (implying that Homer has made the comparison in the past).

== See also ==
- List of Major League Baseball player-managers
- List of Major League Baseball career triples leaders
- List of Major League Baseball career runs scored leaders
- List of Major League Baseball annual triples leaders
- List of Major League Baseball annual stolen base leaders
- Major League Baseball titles leaders
