= 1946 Boston Braves season =

1946 Boston Braves
- League: National League
- Ballpark: Braves Field
- City: Boston, Massachusetts
- Record: 81–72 (.529)
- League place: 4th
- Owners: Louis R. Perini
- General managers: John J. Quinn
- Managers: Billy Southworth
- Radio: WNAC (Jim Britt, Tom Hussey)

The 1946 Boston Braves season was the 76th in the history of the Major League Baseball franchise, and its 71st season as a charter member of the National League. In finishing 81–72 (.529) and in fourth place, the Braves enjoyed their most successful year since 1933, and signaled the post-World War II renaissance of the franchise under its new ownership group, headed by Louis R. Perini, and its Baseball Hall of Fame manager, Billy Southworth, in his first year at the Boston helm after departing the St. Louis Cardinals. The 1946 team set a new club record for attendance, with 969,373 paying fans passing through Braves Field's turnstiles; it would break that record in 1947.

== Regular season ==
The Braves' home schedule began on an inauspicious note April 16. Perini and his partners had invested $500,000 in refurbishing Braves Field, installing lights for night baseball and applying a fresh coat of green paint to the wooden grandstands. But colder than expected April weather foiled their plans. The club's home opener, against the Brooklyn Dodgers, attracted 19,482 fans, who witnessed a 5–3 Boston victory. However, some 13,000 of those fans were dismayed to discover that their clothing was smeared with green paint, still wet, from their grandstand seats. The seats eventually dried out, as the Braves went on an early-season road trip punctuated by a Sunday doubleheader played at Fenway Park, home of the Red Sox of the American League.

On the other hand, the first-ever major-league night game to be played in the city of Boston, on May 11 against the New York Giants, was an off-field success. The contest, on a Saturday night, drew 37,407 fans to Braves Field—the team's largest crowd since 1933—with the home side sporting satin uniforms, specially designed to glow under the arc lights of night baseball. On the field, however, the Giants' Monte Kennedy outpitched Boston's Johnny Sain, 5–1. Later in 1946, during an extended road trip, Braves Field will see further changes when its playing surface is lowered to improve sight lines.

His May 11 setback notwithstanding, Sain was the Braves' leading pitcher, winning 20 games and posting a superb 2.21 earned run average, second-best in the National League. Although a poor May and June doomed their pennant chances, a strong 36–23 mark during August and September enabled the Braves to claim the final spot in the first division, only one game out of third place.

=== Season standings ===
National League
Team	W	L	Pct.	GB	Home	Road
St. Louis Cardinals	98	58	.628	—	49‍–‍29	49‍–‍29
Brooklyn Dodgers	96	60	.615	2	56‍–‍22	40‍–‍38
Chicago Cubs	82	71	.536	14½	44‍–‍33	38‍–‍38
Boston Braves	81	72	.529	15½	45‍–‍31	36‍–‍41
Philadelphia Phillies	69	85	.448	28	41‍–‍36	28‍–‍49
Cincinnati Reds	67	87	.435	30	35‍–‍42	32‍–‍45
Pittsburgh Pirates	63	91	.409	34	37‍–‍40	26‍–‍51
New York Giants	61	93	.396	36	38‍–‍39	23‍–‍54

=== Record vs. opponents ===
1946 National League record Sources:
Team	BSN	BRO	CHC	CIN	NYG	PHI	PIT	STL
Boston	—	5–17	12–9–1	15–7	13–9	14–8	15–7	7–15
Brooklyn	17–5	—	11–11	14–8–1	15–7	17–5	14–8	8–16
Chicago	9–12–1	11–11	—	13–9	17–5	12–10	12–10–1	8–14
Cincinnati	7–15	8–14–1	9–13	—	14–8	8–14–1	13–9	8–14
New York	9–13	7–15	5–17	8–14	—	12–10	10–12	10–12
Philadelphia	8–14	5–17	10–12	14–8–1	10–12	—	14–8	8–14
Pittsburgh	7–15	8–14	10–12–1	9–13	12–10	8–14	—	9–13
St. Louis	15–7	16–8	14–8	14–8	12–10	14–8	13–9	—

=== Roster ===
1946 Boston Braves
Roster
Pitchers: 19 Frank Barrett; 13 Mort Cooper; 35 Don Hendrickson; 17 Johnny Hutchings; 21 Al Javery; 34,36 Si Johnson; 38 Jim Konstanty; 26 Bill Lee; -- Dick Mulligan; 32 Johnny Niggeling; 25 Bill Posedel; 22 Earl Reid; 17 Steve Roser; 33 Johnny Sain; 15 Elmer Singleton; 21 Warren Spahn; 19,34 Lefty Wallace; 18 Ernie White; 23 Ace Williams; 16 Ed Wright	Catchers: 15 Bob Brady; 27 Stew Hofferth; 10 Phil Masi; 27 Ken O'Dea; 6 Don Padgett; 18 Hugh Poland; Infielders: 14 Dick Culler; 23 Alvin Dark; 11 Nanny Fernandez; 20 Billy Herman; 12 Johnny Hopp; 3 Johnny McCarthy; 20 Skippy Roberge; 8 Connie Ryan; 4,5,37 Ray Sanders; 2 Sibby Sisti; 4 Max West; 7 Whitey Wietelmann	Outfielders: 2 Johnny Barrett; 24 Carden Gillenwater; 1 Tommy Holmes; 22 Danny Litwhiler; 31 Mike McCormick; 3 Tommy Neill; 4,5 Bama Rowell; 6 Chuck Workman; Other batters: 32 Ducky Detweiler; -- Dee Phillips	Manager: 30 Billy Southworth; Coaches: 28 Johnny Cooney; 29 Jake Flowers; 9 Bob Keely

== Player stats ==
=== Batting ===
==== Starters by position ====
Note: Pos = Position; G = Games played; AB = At bats; H = Hits; Avg. = Batting average; HR = Home runs; RBI = Runs batted in

Pos	Player	G	AB	H	Avg.	HR	RBI
C	Phil Masi	133	397	106	.267	3	62
1B	Ray Sanders	80	259	63	.243	6	35
2B	Connie Ryan	143	502	121	.241	1	48
SS	Dick Culler	134	482	123	.255	0	33
3B	Nanny Fernandez	115	372	95	.255	2	42
OF	Carden Gillenwater	99	224	51	.228	1	14
OF	Bama Rowell	95	293	82	.280	3	31
OF	Tommy Holmes	149	568	176	.310	6	79

==== Other batters ====
Note: G = Games played; AB = At bats; H = Hits; Avg. = Batting average; HR = Home runs; RBI = Runs batted in

Player	G	AB	H	Avg.	HR	RBI
Johnny Hopp	129	445	148	.333	3	48
Billy Herman	75	252	77	.306	3	22
Danny Litwhiler	79	247	72	.291	8	38
Skippy Roberge	48	169	39	.231	2	20
Mike McCormick	59	164	43	.262	1	16
Don Padgett	44	98	25	.255	2	21
Whitey Wietelmann	44	78	16	.205	0	5
Stew Hofferth	20	58	12	.207	0	10
Chuck Workman	25	48	8	.167	2	7
Tommy Neill	13	45	12	.267	0	7
Johnny Barrett	24	43	10	.233	0	6
Ken O'Dea	12	32	7	.219	0	2
Alvin Dark	15	13	3	.231	0	1
Johnny McCarthy	2	7	1	.143	0	1
Hugh Poland	4	6	1	.167	0	0
Bob Brady	3	5	1	.200	0	0
Dee Phillips	2	2	1	.500	0	0
Ducky Detweiler	1	1	0	.000	0	0
Max West	1	1	0	.000	0	0
Sibby Sisti	1	0	0	----	0	0

=== Pitching ===
==== Starting pitchers ====
Note: G = Games pitched; IP = Innings pitched; W = Wins; L = Losses; ERA = Earned run average; SO = Strikeouts

Player	G	IP	W	L	ERA	SO
Johnny Sain	37	265.0	20	14	2.21	129
Mort Cooper	28	199.0	13	11	3.12	83
Bill Lee	25	140.0	10	9	4.18	32
Warren Spahn	24	125.2	8	5	2.94	67
Johnny Niggeling	8	58.0	2	5	3.26	24
Johnny Hutchings	1	3.0	0	1	9.00	1

==== Other pitchers ====
Note: G = Games pitched; IP = Innings pitched; W = Wins; L = Losses; ERA = Earned run average; SO = Strikeouts

Player	G	IP	W	L	ERA	SO
Ed Wright	36	176.1	12	9	3.52	44
Si Johnson	28	127.0	6	5	2.76	41
Lefty Wallace	27	75.1	3	3	4.18	27
Al Javery	2	3.1	0	1	13.50	0

==== Relief pitchers ====
Note: G = Games pitched; W = Wins; L = Losses; SV = Saves; ERA = Earned run average; SO = Strikeouts

Player	G	W	L	SV	ERA	SO
Bill Posedel	19	2	0	4	6.99	9
Frank Barrett	23	2	4	1	5.09	12
Elmer Singleton	15	0	1	1	3.74	17
Steve Roser	14	1	1	1	3.60	18
Ernie White	12	0	1	0	4.18	8
Jim Konstanty	10	0	1	0	5.28	9
Dick Mulligan	4	1	0	0	2.35	4
Whitey Wietelmann	3	0	0	0	8.10	2
Earl Reid	2	1	0	0	3.00	2
Don Hendrickson	2	0	1	0	4.50	2
Ace Williams	1	0	0	0	----	0

== Farm system ==
Level	Team	League	Manager
AAA	Indianapolis Indians	American Association	Bill Burwell
AAA	Seattle Rainiers	Pacific Coast League	Bill Skiff and Jo-Jo White
A	Hartford Chiefs	Eastern League	Dutch Dorman
B	Evansville Braves	Illinois–Indiana–Iowa League	Bob Coleman
B	Pawtucket Slaters	New England League	Hughie Wise
B	Jackson Senators	Southeastern League	Travis Jackson
B	Vancouver Capilanos	Western International League	Syl Johnson and Eddie Carnett
C	Raleigh Capitals	Carolina League	Charles Carroll and Ray Thomas
C	Miami Beach Flamingos	Florida International League	Max Rosenfeld
C	Leavenworth Braves	Western Association	Charles Carman
D	Bluefield Blue-Grays	Appalachian League	Walt DeFreitas and Bud Clancy
D	Owensboro Oilers	KITTY League	Earl Browne
D	Mahanoy City Bluebirds	North Atlantic League	Buck Boyle and Charles Dugan
D	Richmond Roses	Ohio State League	Merle Settlemire

LEAGUE CHAMPIONS: Evansville, Raleigh, Owensboro
