= 1946 Pittsburgh Pirates season =

1946 Pittsburgh Pirates
- League: National League
- Ballpark: Forbes Field
- City: Pittsburgh, Pennsylvania
- Owners: Bill Benswanger; Frank E. McKinney, Bing Crosby, John W. Galbreath and Thomas P. Johnson
- General managers: Ray Kennedy
- Managers: Frankie Frisch, Spud Davis
- Radio: WWSW; Rosey Rowswell, Jack Craddock

The 1946 Pittsburgh Pirates season was the 65th in the history of the Major League Baseball franchise and its jubilee of diamonds in the National League. The Pirates finished seventh in the league standings with a record of 63–91, and attracted 749,962 fans to Forbes Field.

It was a year of transition for the Pirates. Ralph Kiner made his debut, and he proceeded to lead the National League in home runs with 23. He was one of only two NL players to reach 20+ home runs that year (Johnny Mize was runner-up with 22), but 1946 would be the first of seven straight years in which Kiner would lead his league, or tie for the lead, in homers en route to the Baseball Hall of Fame.

On August 8, the Pirates changed hands for the first time since 1900 when the heirs of Hall of Fame owner Barney Dreyfuss sold the franchise to a syndicate led by Indianapolis banker Frank E. McKinney and including John W. Galbreath, Thomas P. Johnson and Bing Crosby. Galbreath became majority owner in 1950, and under his family's 35-year stewardship, the Pirates would win the 1960, 1971 and 1979 World Series championships.

The sale was accompanied by changes in the dugout and front office. Frankie Frisch, manager since 1940, resigned his post September 27 with three games to go in the season. After coach Spud Davis finished the campaign, the Pirates acquired 37-year-old Billy Herman, like Frisch a Hall of Fame second baseman, and named him playing manager for 1947. General manager Ray Kennedy, in only his first year in the position, was demoted by the new owners to farm system director and replaced by Roy Hamey.

In addition, the 1946 Pirates were the focus of an unsuccessful unionizing campaign by the recently formed American Baseball Guild. After the Guild successfully enrolled 34 of the club's 36 roster players when the season began, it was rebuffed by Pirates' then-president William Benswanger when it attempted to start collective bargaining talks. In response, the Guild called for a strike authorization vote on June 7 before a game at Forbes Field. Although 20 of the team's 36 players voted yes to a strike, the union fell short of the needed two-thirds supermajority, and the Guild movement collapsed. Players would form their own association in 1953, and the MLBPA would become their first official bargaining unit in 1966.

== Regular season ==
=== Season standings ===
National League
Team	W	L	Pct.	GB	Home	Road
St. Louis Cardinals	98	58	.628	—	49‍–‍29	49‍–‍29
Brooklyn Dodgers	96	60	.615	2	56‍–‍22	40‍–‍38
Chicago Cubs	82	71	.536	14½	44‍–‍33	38‍–‍38
Boston Braves	81	72	.529	15½	45‍–‍31	36‍–‍41
Philadelphia Phillies	69	85	.448	28	41‍–‍36	28‍–‍49
Cincinnati Reds	67	87	.435	30	35‍–‍42	32‍–‍45
Pittsburgh Pirates	63	91	.409	34	37‍–‍40	26‍–‍51
New York Giants	61	93	.396	36	38‍–‍39	23‍–‍54

=== Record vs. opponents ===
1946 National League record Sources:
Team	BSN	BRO	CHC	CIN	NYG	PHI	PIT	STL
Boston	—	5–17	12–9–1	15–7	13–9	14–8	15–7	7–15
Brooklyn	17–5	—	11–11	14–8–1	15–7	17–5	14–8	8–16
Chicago	9–12–1	11–11	—	13–9	17–5	12–10	12–10–1	8–14
Cincinnati	7–15	8–14–1	9–13	—	14–8	8–14–1	13–9	8–14
New York	9–13	7–15	5–17	8–14	—	12–10	10–12	10–12
Philadelphia	8–14	5–17	10–12	14–8–1	10–12	—	14–8	8–14
Pittsburgh	7–15	8–14	10–12–1	9–13	12–10	8–14	—	9–13
St. Louis	15–7	16–8	14–8	14–8	12–10	14–8	13–9	—

=== Game log ===
1946 Game Log: 63–91 (Home: 37–40; Away: 26–51)
April: 5–8 (Home: 4–4; Away: 1–4)

#	Date	Opponent	Score	Win	Loss	Save	Attendance	Record
1	April 16	@ Cardinals	6–4	**Heintzelman** (1–0)	Brecheen	—	14,000	1–0
2	April 17	@ Cardinals	0–6	Lanier	**Gables** (0–1)	—	4,819	1–1
3	April 18	@ Cardinals	2–6	Pollet	**Strincevich** (0–1)	—	6,328	1–2
4	April 20	Reds	2–1	**Sewell** (1–0)	Walters	—	27,891	2–2
5	April 21	Reds	2–8	Heusser	**Hopper** (0–1)	—		2–3
6	April 21	Reds	3–4	Beggs	**Hallett** (0–1)	—	30,237	2–4
7	April 23	Cubs	1–3	Passeau	**Albosta** (0–1)	—	8,224	2–5
8	April 24	Cubs	4–3	**Sewell** (2–0)	Schmitz	—	6,287	3–5
9	April 25	Cardinals	5–3	**Heintzelman** (2–0)	Brecheen	**Roe** (1)	10,585	4–5
10	April 26	Cardinals	2–3	Martin	**Ostermueller** (0–1)	—	4,885	4–6
11	April 27	@ Reds	2–5	Beggs	**Strincevich** (0–2)	—	3,086	4–7
12	April 28	@ Reds	1–7	Heusser	**Sewell** (2–1)	—	24,002	4–8
13	April 30	Phillies	4–1	**Hallett** (1–1)	Hughes	—	4,970	5–8

May: 10–10 (Home: 8–5; Away: 2–5)

#	Date	Opponent	Score	Win	Loss	Save	Attendance	Record
14	May 1	Phillies	0–8	Pearson	**Albosta** (0–2)	—	4,426	5–9
15	May 2	Phillies	8–3	**Ostermueller** (1–1)	Judd	—	3,458	6–9
16	May 3	Braves	3–2	**Heintzelman** (3–0)	Sain	—		7–9
17	May 5	Dodgers	5–4 (11)	**Hallett** (2–1)	Lombardi	—		8–9
18	May 5	Dodgers	4–3 (6)	**Roe** (1–0)	Casey	—	37,953	9–9
19	May 8	Giants	0–1	Koslo	**Ostermueller** (1–2)	—	6,267	9–10
20	May 9	Giants	1–6	Voiselle	**Roe** (1–1)	—	7,786	9–11
21	May 12	@ Cubs	1–3	Passeau	**Heintzelman** (3–1)	—	22,065	9–12
22	May 14	@ Braves	1–5	Wallace	**Gables** (0–2)	—	20,762	9–13
23	May 17	@ Dodgers	6–16	Hatten	**Strincevich** (0–3)	—	9,307	9–14
24	May 19	@ Giants	3–1	**Ostermueller** (2–2)	Kennedy	—		10–14
25	May 19	@ Giants	1–5	Koslo	**Heintzelman** (3–2)	—	39,482	10–15
26	May 22	@ Phillies	2–6	Rowe	**Heintzelman** (3–3)	Karl	4,813	10–16
27	May 23	@ Phillies	10–2	**Bahr** (1–0)	Hughes	—	4,746	11–16
28	May 24	Cubs	6–3	**Roe** (2–1)	Borowy	—	27,432	12–16
29	May 26	Cubs	8–2	**Heintzelman** (4–3)	Bithorn	—	13,000	13–16
30	May 28	Reds	6–3	**Bahr** (2–0)	Heusser	**Strincevich** (1)	16,995	14–16
31	May 29	Reds	6–7	Gumbert	**Strincevich** (0–4)	—	4,112	14–17
32	May 30	Cardinals	9–3	**Ostermueller** (3–2)	Krist	—		15–17
33	May 30	Cardinals	11–12	Schmidt	**Hallett** (2–2)	Wilks	34,985	15–18

June: 11–19 (Home: 8–9; Away: 3–10)

#	Date	Opponent	Score	Win	Loss	Save	Attendance	Record
34	June 2	Phillies	5–1	**Sewell** (3–1)	Hughes	—		16–18
35	June 2	Phillies	3–10	Jurisich	**Bahr** (2–1)	Karl	8,971	16–19
36	June 3	Phillies	4–8	Schanz	**Albosta** (0–3)	Karl	2,175	16–20
37	June 4	Dodgers	4–3	**Ostermueller** (4–2)	Casey	—		17–20
38	June 4	Dodgers	6–7 (11)	Webber	**Lanning** (0–1)	Head	11,521	17–21
39	June 5	Dodgers	3–5	Higbe	**Roe** (2–2)	Melton	26,206	17–22
40	June 6	Dodgers	8–13	Behrman	**Sewell** (3–2)	Herring	3,093	17–23
41	June 7	Giants	10–5	**Bahr** (3–1)	Voiselle	**Gables** (1)	16,884	18–23
42	June 8	Giants	3–5	Koslo	**Strincevich** (0–5)	—	5,785	18–24
43	June 9	Giants	2–1	**Ostermueller** (5–2)	Kennedy	—		19–24
44	June 9	Giants	5–1	**Lanning** (1–1)	Joyce	—	24,787	20–24
45	June 10	Braves	5–10	Wright	**Roe** (2–3)	Posedel	3,652	20–25
46	June 11	Braves	5–3	**Sewell** (4–2)	Cooper	—	17,181	21–25
47	June 15	@ Phillies	1–3	Rowe	**Strincevich** (0–6)	Mauney	23,804	21–26
48	June 16	@ Phillies	3–4	Raffensberger	**Sewell** (4–3)	Hughes		21–27
49	June 16	@ Phillies	10–1	**Ostermueller** (6–2)	Stanceu	—	36,910	22–27
50	June 17	@ Phillies	3–7	Mauney	**Gables** (0–3)	—	16,529	22–28
51	June 18	@ Dodgers	6–3	**Heintzelman** (5–3)	Barney	—	32,565	23–28
52	June 19	@ Dodgers	0–7	Hatten	**Roe** (2–4)	—	13,093	23–29
53	June 20	@ Dodgers	3–7	Higbe	**Strincevich** (0–7)	—	9,490	23–30
54	June 21	@ Braves	2–3	Cooper	**Ostermueller** (6–3)	—	13,256	23–31
55	June 22	@ Braves	3–4 (10)	Roser	**Sewell** (4–4)	—	4,421	23–32
56	June 23	@ Braves	3–4	Lee	**Heintzelman** (5–4)	Posedel		23–33
57	June 23	@ Braves	0–4	Sain	**Roe** (2–5)	—	19,784	23–34
58	June 25	@ Giants	3–0	**Strincevich** (1–7)	Schumacher	—	20,317	24–34
59	June 26	@ Giants	0–4	Koslo	**Bahr** (3–2)	—	4,812	24–35
60	June 27	Cubs	5–6	Erickson	**Hallett** (2–3)	Schmitz	3,019	24–36
61	June 28	Cardinals	1–5	Pollet	**Roe** (2–6)	—	20,475	24–37
62	June 30	Cardinals	4–3	**Ostermueller** (7–3)	Brazle	—		25–37
63	June 30	Cardinals	1–0	**Strincevich** (2–7)	Brecheen	—	20,040	26–37

July: 11–19 (Home: 5–7; Away: 6–12)

#	Date	Opponent	Score	Win	Loss	Save	Attendance	Record
64	July 1	@ Cubs	1–0	**Sewell** (5–4)	Wyse	—	18,828	27–37
65	July 2	@ Cubs	9–0	**Heintzelman** (6–4)	Chipman	—	12,970	28–37
66	July 3	@ Cubs	3–4	Kush	**Gerheauser** (0–1)	—		28–38
67	July 3	@ Cubs	1–2	Erickson	**Roe** (2–7)	—	25,623	28–39
68	July 4	@ Reds	6–1	**Strincevich** (3–7)	Heusser	—		29–39
69	July 4	@ Reds	3–4 (11)	Shoun	**Albosta** (0–4)	—	15,437	29–40
70	July 5	@ Reds	3–4	Walters	**Sewell** (5–5)	—	18,519	29–41
71	July 6	@ Cardinals	4–12	Wilks	**Gables** (0–4)	—	12,660	29–42
72	July 7	@ Cardinals	3–4	Dickson	**Ostermueller** (7–4)	—		29–43
73	July 7	@ Cardinals	0–6	Pollet	**Heintzelman** (6–5)	—	16,625	29–44
74	July 11	Phillies	1–4	Rowe	**Strincevich** (3–8)	—	3,772	29–45
75	July 12	Phillies	4–3	**Bahr** (4–2)	Judd	**Roe** (2)	15,047	30–45
76	July 13	Phillies	8–1	**Lanning** (2–1)	Schanz	—	5,011	31–45
77	July 14	Braves	1–4	Spahn	**Ostermueller** (7–5)	—		31–46
78	July 14	Braves	5–2	**Sewell** (6–5)	Wright	—	17,414	32–46
79	July 15	Braves	2–3	Niggeling	**Heintzelman** (6–6)	—	11,787	32–47
80	July 16	Braves	0–10	Cooper	**Albosta** (0–5)	—	2,387	32–48
81	July 17	Giants	8–5	**Strincevich** (4–8)	Trinkle	—		33–48
82	July 18	Giants	7–3	**Roe** (3–7)	Koslo	**Lanning** (1)	3,397	34–48
83	July 20	Dodgers	1–4	Herring	**Heintzelman** (6–7)	—	7,736	34–49
84	July 21	Dodgers	0–3	Lombardi	**Ostermueller** (7–6)	—		34–50
85	July 21	Dodgers	5–6	Behrman	**Sewell** (6–6)	Gregg	18,844	34–51
86	July 24	@ Phillies	0–2	Rowe	**Strincevich** (4–9)	—	22,025	34–52
87	July 25	@ Phillies	2–1	**Lanning** (3–1)	Judd	—		35–52
88	July 25	@ Phillies	2–9	Donnelly	**Sewell** (6–7)	—	10,252	35–53
89	July 26	@ Dodgers	5–0	**Ostermueller** (8–6)	Lombardi	—	26,918	36–53
90	July 27	@ Dodgers	3–4	Casey	**Roe** (3–8)	—	33,645	36–54
91	July 27	@ Dodgers	3–4	Higbe	**Albosta** (0–6)	Casey	33,645	36–55
92	July 28	@ Dodgers	7–3	**Strincevich** (5–9)	Barney	—	19,836	37–55
93	July 31	@ Braves	1–2	Sain	**Lanning** (3–2)	—	9,343	37–56

August: 11–15 (Home: 9–10; Away: 2–5)

#	Date	Opponent	Score	Win	Loss	Save	Attendance	Record
94	August 2	@ Giants	6–0	**Ostermueller** (9–6)	Koslo	—	11,873	38–56
95	August 2	@ Giants	2–3	Trinkle	**Heintzelman** (6–8)	Thompson	12,561	38–57
96	August 4	@ Giants	0–4	Budnick	**Strincevich** (5–10)	—		38–58
97	August 4	@ Giants	1–10	Kennedy	**Lanning** (3–3)	—	27,709	38–59
98	August 7	Cardinals	1–8	Brecheen	**Ostermueller** (9–7)	—	14,888	38–60
99	August 9	Cubs	3–9	Erickson	**Heintzelman** (6–9)	—	13,624	38–61
100	August 10	Cubs	3–2	**Strincevich** (6–10)	Schmitz	—	3,452	39–61
101	August 11	Cubs	10–9	**Gerheauser** (1–1)	Borowy	—		40–61
102	August 11	Cubs	4–4			—	18,700	40–61
103	August 12	Reds	3–2	**Bahr** (5–2)	Heusser	—	2,764	41–61
104	August 13	Reds	3–2	**Hallett** (3–3)	Gumbert	—	15,575	42–61
105	August 14	Reds	3–2	**Strincevich** (7–10)	Malloy	—	3,890	43–61
106	August 16	@ Cardinals	3–0	**Heintzelman** (7–9)	Dickson	—	10,795	44–61
107	August 17	@ Cubs	1–2	Schmitz	**Bahr** (5–3)	—	15,127	44–62
108	August 18	@ Cubs	0–8	Erickson	**Hallett** (3–4)	—	30,965	44–63
109	August 20	Dodgers	10–0	**Strincevich** (8–10)	Lombardi	—	31,106	45–63
110	August 21	Dodgers	2–8	Hatten	**Heintzelman** (7–10)	—	7,974	45–64
111	August 22	Giants	0–1 (10)	Kennedy	**Sewell** (6–8)	—	3,958	45–65
112	August 23	Giants	7–3	**Bahr** (6–3)	Trinkle	—	15,306	46–65
113	August 24	Giants	1–8	Voiselle	**Lanning** (3–4)	—	5,260	46–66
114	August 25	Braves	5–7	Wright	**Ostermueller** (9–8)	Barrett		46–67
115	August 25	Braves	5–10	Johnson	**Strincevich** (8–11)	Spahn	20,049	46–68
116	August 26	Braves	3–2	**Heintzelman** (8–10)	Niggeling	—	2,169	47–68
117	August 27	Braves	1–9	Spahn	**Ostermueller** (9–9)	—	3,094	47–69
118	August 28	Phillies	1–4	Judd	**Sewell** (6–9)	Donnelly	11,594	47–70
119	August 29	Phillies	2–5	Raffensberger	**Bahr** (6–4)	—	1,124	47–71
120	August 31	Cardinals	6–1	**Strincevich** (9–11)	Dickson	—	6,074	48–71

September: 15–20 (Home: 3–5; Away: 12–15)

#	Date	Opponent	Score	Win	Loss	Save	Attendance	Record
121	September 1	Cardinals	6–7 (10)	Pollet	**Sewell** (6–10)	—		48–72
122	September 1	Cardinals	2–1 (7)	**Ostermueller** (10–9)	Brecheen	—	28,167	49–72
123	September 2	Cubs	4–1	**Bahr** (7–4)	Erickson	—		50–72
124	September 2	Cubs	3–7	Bauers	**Sewell** (6–11)	—	18,237	50–73
125	September 3	Cubs	0–2	Chipman	**Hallett** (3–5)	—	1,802	50–74
126	September 4	@ Reds	0–6	Beggs	**Strincevich** (9–12)	—	10,465	50–75
127	September 5	@ Reds	2–1	**Sewell** (7–11)	Vander Meer	—	1,254	51–75
128	September 6	@ Cardinals	6–7	Beazley	**Heintzelman** (8–11)	Burkhart	17,496	51–76
129	September 7	@ Cardinals	9–2	**Ostermueller** (11–9)	Pollet	—	17,266	52–76
130	September 8	@ Cardinals	4–5 (11)	Munger	**Bahr** (7–5)	—		52–77
131	September 8	@ Cardinals	2–12	Brazle	**Strincevich** (9–13)	—	25,572	52–78
132	September 10	@ Giants	7–4	**Gerheauser** (2–1)	Trinkle	—	9,971	53–78
133	September 11	@ Giants	7–6	**Lanning** (4–4)	Thompson	—		54–78
134	September 11	@ Giants	7–5	**Gables** (1–4)	Voiselle	**Heintzelman** (1)	6,358	55–78
135	September 12	@ Braves	1–0	**Hallett** (4–5)	Johnson	—		56–78
136	September 12	@ Braves	1–2	Wright	**Strincevich** (9–14)	—	3,822	56–79
137	September 13	@ Braves	4–2 (14)	**Ostermueller** (12–9)	Cooper	—		57–79
138	September 13	@ Braves	10–1	**Bahr** (8–5)	Lee	—	2,776	58–79
139	September 14	@ Braves	3–9	Sain	**Gerheauser** (2–2)	—	6,077	58–80
140	September 15	@ Phillies	5–6 (11)	Karl	**Sewell** (7–12)	—	14,279	58–81
141	September 16	@ Phillies	0–2	Raffensberger	**Hallett** (4–6)	—	19,247	58–82
142	September 18	@ Dodgers	3–2	**Ostermueller** (13–9)	Higbe	—		59–82
143	September 18	@ Dodgers	0–3	Branca	**Heintzelman** (8–12)	—	26,659	59–83
144	September 19	@ Dodgers	0–7	Gregg	**Strincevich** (9–15)	—	11,462	59–84
145	September 21	Reds	2–1 (13)	**Hallett** (5–6)	Gumbert	—	13,810	60–84
146	September 22	Reds	2–4	Beggs	**Lanning** (4–5)	—		60–85
147	September 22	Reds	5–6	Blackwell	**Walsh** (0–1)	Malloy	11,138	60–86
148	September 24	@ Cubs	3–13	Erickson	**Ostermueller** (13–10)	Chipman		60–87
149	September 24	@ Cubs	13–0 (8)	**Sewell** (8–12)	Lade	—	8,396	61–87
150	September 25	@ Cubs	6–5 (16)	**Gables** (2–4)	Lade	—	3,339	62–87
151	September 26	@ Cubs	3–5	Hanyzewski	**Hallett** (5–7)	Meyer	5,369	62–88
152	September 27	@ Reds	0–8	Beggs	**Bahr** (8–6)	—	1,120	62–89
153	September 28	@ Reds	10–3	**Strincevich** (10–15)	Blackwell	—	1,930	63–89
154	September 29	@ Reds	0–1	Vander Meer	**Howard** (0–1)	—		63–90
155	September 29	@ Reds	2–3	Hetki	**Tate** (0–1)	—	6,329	63–91

Legend: = Win = Loss = Tie
Bold = Pirates team member

=== Notable transactions ===
- June 17, 1946: Frank Colman was purchased from the Pirates by the New York Yankees.
- September 25, 1946: The Pirates traded $35,000 to the Oakland Oaks for Wally Westlake. The Pirates completed the deal by sending Johnny Hutchings to the Oaks on December 5.

=== Roster ===
1946 Pittsburgh Pirates
**Roster**
**Pitchers**: 24 Ed Albosta; 46 Ed Bahr; 47 Bill Clemensen; 45 Ken Gables; 40 Al Gerheauser; 26 Hank Gornicki; 39 Jack Hallett; 20 Ken Heintzelman; 42 Jim Hopper; 11 Lee Howard; 25 Johnny Lanning; 21 Fritz Ostermueller; 29 Preacher Roe; 30 Rip Sewell; 22 Nick Strincevich; 11,47 Al Tate; 27 Junior Walsh; 31 Lefty Wilkie	**Catchers**: 44 Bill Baker; 10 Hank Camelli; 31 Roy Jarvis; 12 Al López; 1 Bill Salkeld; 28 Vinnie Smith; **Infielders**: 2 Jimmy Brown; 5 Pete Coscarart; 4 Billy Cox; 15 Elbie Fletcher; 16 Frankie Gustine; 6 Lee Handley; 9 Burgess Whitehead; 14 Frankie Zak	**Outfielders**: 18 Johnny Barrett; 23 Frank Colman; 8 Bob Elliott; 3 Al Gionfriddo; 49 Ben Guintini; 43 Ralph Kiner; 32 Jim Russell; 7,19 Maurice Van Robays; 41 Chuck Workman; **Other batters**: 37 Alf Anderson; 17 Vic Barnhart	**Manager**: 36 Spud Davis; 35 Frankie Frisch; **Coaches**: 34 Del Bissonette; 36 Spud Davis; 33 Honus Wagner

== Player stats ==
=== Batting ===
==== Starters by position ====
Note: Pos = Position; G = Games played; AB = At bats; H = Hits; Avg. = Batting average; HR = Home runs; RBI = Runs batted in

Pos	Player	G	AB	H	Avg.	HR	RBI
C	Al López	56	150	46	.307	1	12
1B	Elbie Fletcher	148	532	136	.256	4	66
2B	Frankie Gustine	131	495	128	.259	8	52
SS	Billy Cox	121	411	119	.290	2	36
3B	Lee Handley	116	416	99	.238	1	28
OF	Ralph Kiner	144	502	124	.247	23	81
OF	Bob Elliott	140	486	128	.263	5	68
OF	Jim Russell	146	516	143	.277	8	50

==== Other batters ====
Note: G = Games played; AB = At bats; H = Hits; Avg. = Batting average; HR = Home runs; RBI = Runs batted in

Player	G	AB	H	Avg.	HR	RBI
Jimmy Brown	79	241	58	.241	0	12
Bill Salkeld	69	160	47	.294	3	19
Maurice Van Robays	59	146	31	.212	1	12
Chuck Workman	58	145	32	.221	2	16
Burgess Whitehead	55	127	28	.220	0	5
Bill Baker	53	113	27	.239	1	8
Al Gionfriddo	64	102	26	.255	0	10
Hank Camelli	42	96	20	.208	0	5
Johnny Barrett	32	71	12	.169	0	6
Frank Colman	26	53	9	.170	1	6
Vinnie Smith	7	21	4	.190	0	0
Frankie Zak	21	20	4	.200	0	0
Roy Jarvis	2	4	1	.250	0	0
Ben Guintini	2	3	0	.000	0	0
Pete Coscarart	3	2	1	.500	0	0
Alf Anderson	2	1	0	.000	0	0
Vic Barnhart	2	1	0	.000	0	0

=== Pitching ===
==== Starting pitchers ====
Note: G = Games pitched; IP = Innings pitched; W = Wins; L = Losses; ERA = Earned run average; SO = Strikeouts

Player	G	IP	W	L	ERA	SO
Fritz Ostermueller	27	193.1	13	10	2.84	57
Nick Strincevich	32	176.0	10	15	3.58	49
Ken Heintzelman	32	157.2	8	12	3.77	57
Rip Sewell	25	149.1	8	12	3.68	33

==== Other pitchers ====
Note: G = Games pitched; IP = Innings pitched; W = Wins; L = Losses; ERA = Earned run average; SO = Strikeouts

Player	G	IP	W	L	ERA	SO
Ed Bahr	27	136.2	8	6	2.63	44
Jack Hallett	35	115.0	5	7	3.29	64
Ken Gables	32	100.2	2	4	5.27	39
Johnny Lanning	27	91.0	4	5	3.07	16
Preacher Roe	21	70.0	3	8	5.14	28
Ed Albosta	17	39.2	0	6	6.13	19
Lee Howard	3	13.1	0	1	2.03	6
Junior Walsh	4	10.1	0	1	5.23	2
Al Tate	2	9.0	0	1	5.00	2
Jim Hopper	2	4.1	0	1	10.38	1

==== Relief pitchers ====
Note: G = Games pitched; W = Wins; L = Losses; SV = Saves; ERA = Earned run average; SO = Strikeouts

Player	G	W	L	SV	ERA	SO
Al Gerheauser	35	2	2	0	3.97	32
Hank Gornicki	7	0	0	0	3.55	4
Lefty Wilkie	7	0	0	0	10.57	3
Bill Clemensen	1	0	0	0	0.00	2

== Farm system ==
Level	Team	League	Manager
AAA	Hollywood Stars	Pacific Coast League	Buck Fausett and Jimmy Dykes
AA	Birmingham Barons	Southern Association	Frank Snyder
A	Albany Senators	Eastern League	Ripper Collins
B	York White Roses	Interstate League	Boom-Boom Beck
B	Anniston Rams	Southeastern League	Tommy West
B	Selma Cloverleafs	Southeastern League	Frank Oceak
B	Yakima Stars	Western International League	Spencer Harris and Harlond Clift
C	Oil City Oilers	Middle Atlantic League	Charles Muse and Charles Harig
D	Tallassee Indians	Georgia–Alabama League	Johnnie Heving
D	Tallahassee Pirates	Georgia–Florida League	Art Doll
D	Bartlesville Owls	Kansas–Oklahoma–Missouri League	Keith Willoughby
D	Salisbury Pirates	North Carolina State League	Tuck McWilliams
D	Hornell Pirates	PONY League	Lou Briganti and Phil Seghi

LEAGUE CHAMPIONS: Anniston, Tallassee
