= 1946 Brooklyn Dodgers season =

1946 Brooklyn Dodgers
- League: National League
- Ballpark: Ebbets Field
- City: Brooklyn, New York
- Record: 96–60 (.615)
- League place: 2nd
- Owners: James & Dearie Mulvey, Walter O'Malley, Branch Rickey, John L. Smith
- President: Branch Rickey
- Managers: Leo Durocher
- Radio: WHN; Red Barber, Connie Desmond

The 1946 Brooklyn Dodgers finished the season tied for first place with the St. Louis Cardinals. The two teams played in the first ever regular season tie-breaker to decide the pennant, and the Cardinals took two straight to win the title.

This season was the team's – and Major League Baseball's – last non-integrated one.

== Offseason ==
On October 23, 1945, the Dodgers signed Jackie Robinson as a free agent. Robinson was the first black player to be officially a part of a major league organization in over 60 years, since the barring of Fleet and Welday Walker in 1884. For the 1946 season, Robinson was assigned to the Montreal Royals, the Dodgers' top farm team.

Later in the offseason, the Dodgers signed two more players from the Negro leagues, Roy Campanella and Don Newcombe, who were assigned to the Nashua Dodgers.

== Regular season ==
=== Season standings ===
National League
Team	W	L	Pct.	GB	Home	Road
St. Louis Cardinals	98	58	.628	—	49‍–‍29	49‍–‍29
Brooklyn Dodgers	96	60	.615	2	56‍–‍22	40‍–‍38
Chicago Cubs	82	71	.536	14½	44‍–‍33	38‍–‍38
Boston Braves	81	72	.529	15½	45‍–‍31	36‍–‍41
Philadelphia Phillies	69	85	.448	28	41‍–‍36	28‍–‍49
Cincinnati Reds	67	87	.435	30	35‍–‍42	32‍–‍45
Pittsburgh Pirates	63	91	.409	34	37‍–‍40	26‍–‍51
New York Giants	61	93	.396	36	38‍–‍39	23‍–‍54

=== Record vs. opponents ===
1946 National League record Sources:
Team	BSN	BRO	CHC	CIN	NYG	PHI	PIT	STL
Boston	—	5–17	12–9–1	15–7	13–9	14–8	15–7	7–15
Brooklyn	17–5	—	11–11	14–8–1	15–7	17–5	14–8	8–16
Chicago	9–12–1	11–11	—	13–9	17–5	12–10	12–10–1	8–14
Cincinnati	7–15	8–14–1	9–13	—	14–8	8–14–1	13–9	8–14
New York	9–13	7–15	5–17	8–14	—	12–10	10–12	10–12
Philadelphia	8–14	5–17	10–12	14–8–1	10–12	—	14–8	8–14
Pittsburgh	7–15	8–14	10–12–1	9–13	12–10	8–14	—	9–13
St. Louis	15–7	16–8	14–8	14–8	12–10	14–8	13–9	—

=== Opening Day lineup ===
Opening Day lineup
Name	Position
Pee Wee Reese	Shortstop
Billy Herman	Second baseman
Dick Whitman	Left fielder
Gene Hermanski	Right fielder
Jack Graham	First baseman
Carl Furillo	Center fielder
Lew Riggs	Third baseman
Ferrell Anderson	Catcher
Hal Gregg	Starting pitcher

=== Notable transactions ===
- April 27, 1946: Jack Graham and Goody Rosen were purchased from the Dodgers by the New York Giants.
- June 12, 1946: Don Padgett was purchased from the Dodgers by the Boston Braves.
- June 15, 1946: Billy Herman was traded by the Dodgers to the Boston Braves for Stew Hofferth.

=== Roster ===
1946 Brooklyn Dodgers
Roster
Pitchers: 26 Rex Barney; 29,34 Hank Behrman; 20 Ralph Branca; 25 Hugh Casey; 26 Curt Davis; 28 Hal Gregg; 19 Joe Hatten; 23 Ed Head; 21 Art Herring; 13 Kirby Higbe; 18 Vic Lombardi; 35 Cal McLish; 37 Rube Melton; 38 Paul Minner; -- Glen Moulder; 38 Harry Taylor; 32 Les Webber	Catchers: 14 Ferrell Anderson; 10 Bruce Edwards; 33 Don Padgett; 4 Mike Sandlock; Infielders: 9 Jack Graham; 16 Billy Herman; 5 Cookie Lavagetto; 34 Eddie Miksis; 17,38 Bob Ramazzotti; 1 Pee Wee Reese; 15 Lew Riggs; 3 Stan Rojek; 8 Howie Schultz; 12 Eddie Stanky; 36 Ed Stevens	Outfielders: 5,6,29 Carl Furillo; 24 Augie Galan; 22 Gene Hermanski; 16 Joe Medwick; 27 Pete Reiser; 35 Goody Rosen; 32 Joe Tepsic; 11 Dixie Walker; 15,31 Dick Whitman; Other batters: 39,49 John Corriden; 31 Otis Davis; 10 Earl Naylor	Manager: 2 Leo Durocher; Coaches: 30 Red Corriden; 7 Charlie Dressen; 40 Clyde Sukeforth

== Player stats ==
=== Batting ===
==== Starters by position ====
Note: Pos = Position; G = Games played; AB = At bats; H = Hits; Avg. = Batting average; HR = Home runs; RBI = Runs batted in

Pos	Player	G	AB	H	Avg.	HR	RBI
C	Bruce Edwards	92	292	78	.267	1	25
1B	Ed Stevens	103	310	75	.242	10	60
2B	Eddie Stanky	144	483	132	.273	0	36
3B	Cookie Lavagetto	88	242	57	.236	3	27
SS	Pee Wee Reese	152	542	154	.284	5	60
OF	Carl Furillo	117	335	95	.284	3	35
OF	Pete Reiser	122	423	117	.277	11	73
OF	Dixie Walker	150	576	184	.319	9	116

==== Other batters ====
Note: G = Games played; AB = At bats; H = Hits; Avg. = Batting average; HR = Home runs; RBI = Runs batted in

Player	G	AB	H	Avg.	HR	RBI
Augie Galan	99	274	85	.310	3	38
Dick Whitman	104	265	69	.260	2	31
Howie Schultz	90	249	63	.253	3	27
Ferrell Anderson	79	199	51	.256	2	14
Billy Herman	47	184	53	.288	0	28
Bob Ramazzotti	62	120	25	.208	0	7
Gene Hermanski	64	110	22	.200	0	8
Joe Medwick	41	77	24	.312	2	18
Eddie Miksis	23	48	7	.146	0	5
Stan Rojek	45	47	13	.277	0	2
Mike Sandlock	19	34	5	.147	0	0
Don Padgett	19	30	5	.167	1	9
Joe Tepsic	15	5	0	.000	0	0
Jack Graham	2	5	1	.200	0	0
Lew Riggs	1	4	0	.000	0	0
Goody Rosen	3	3	1	.333	0	0
Earl Naylor	3	2	0	.000	0	0
Otis Davis	1	0	0	----	0	0
John Corriden	1	0	0	----	0	0

=== Pitching ===
==== Starting pitchers ====
Note: G = Games pitched; IP = Innings pitched; W = Wins; L = Losses; ERA = Earned run average; SO = Strikeouts

Player	G	IP	W	L	ERA	SO
Joe Hatten	42	222.0	14	11	2.84	85
Kirby Higbe	42	210.2	17	8	3.03	134
Vic Lombardi	41	193.0	13	10	2.89	60
Hal Gregg	26	117.1	6	4	2.99	54

==== Other pitchers ====
Note: G = Games pitched; IP = Innings pitched; W = Wins; L = Losses; ERA = Earned run average; SO = Strikeouts

Player	G	IP	W	L	ERA	SO
Hank Behrman	47	150.2	11	5	2.93	78
Rube Melton	24	99.2	6	3	1.99	44
Ralph Branca	24	67.1	3	1	3.88	42
Ed Head	13	56.0	3	2	3.21	17
Rex Barney	16	53.2	2	5	5.87	36
Les Webber	11	43.0	3	3	2.30	16
Jean-Pierre Roy	3	6.1	0	0	9.95	6

==== Relief pitchers ====
Note: G = Games pitched; W = Wins; L = Losses; SV = Saves; ERA = Earned run average; SO = Strikeouts

Player	G	W	L	SV	ERA	SO
Hugh Casey	46	11	5	5	1.99	31
Art Herring	35	7	2	5	3.35	34
Harry Taylor	4	0	0	1	3.86	6
Paul Minner	3	0	1	0	6.75	3
Curt Davis	1	0	0	0	13.50	0
Glen Moulder	1	0	0	0	4.50	1
Cal McLish	1	0	0	0	inf	0

== Awards and honors ==
- 1946 Major League Baseball All-Star Game
  - Dixie Walker starter
  - Kirby Higbe reserve
  - Pee Wee Reese reserve
  - Pete Reiser reserve

=== League top five finishers ===
Kirby Higbe

- #2 in NL in strikeouts (134)
- #3 in NL in wins (17)

Pete Reiser

- MLB leader in stolen bases (34)

Eddie Stanky

- #3 in NL in runs scored (98)

Dixie Walker

- #2 in NL in RBI (116)
- #3 in NL in batting average (.319)

== Farm system ==
Level	Team	League	Manager
AAA	Montreal Royals	International League	Clay Hopper
AAA	St. Paul Saints	American Association	Ray Blades
AA	Ft. Worth Cats	Texas League	Ray Hayworth
AA	Mobile Bears	Southern Association	Alfred Todd
B	Asheville Tourists	Tri-State League	William Sayles
B	Danville Dodgers	Illinois–Indiana–Iowa League	Jake Pitler; Paul Chervinko
B	Nashua Dodgers	New England League	Walter Alston
B	Newport News Dodgers	Piedmont League	John Fitzpatrick
C	Abilene Blue Sox	West Texas–New Mexico League	Hayden Greer
C	Grand Forks Chiefs	Northern League	Glenn Chapman; Rae Blaemire
C	Johnstown Johnnies	Middle Atlantic League	Cyril Pfeifer
C	Santa Barbara Dodgers	California League	Jack Knight; Jack Mele
D	Trois-Rivières Royals	Canadian–American League	Frenchy Bordagaray
D	Cambridge Dodgers	Eastern Shore League	Jimmy Cooney; Barney DeForge
D	Daytona Beach Islanders	Florida State League	Jason Sosh
D	Miami Blues	Kansas–Oklahoma–Missouri League	Guy Froman
D	Olean Oilers	Pennsylvania–Ontario–New York League	Greg Mulleavy
D	Thomasville Dodgers	North Carolina State League	John Carey; Jay Kirke, Jr.
D	Valdosta Dodgers	Georgia–Florida League	Bill Welp
D	Zanesville Dodgers	Ohio–Indiana League	Clay Bryant

LEAGUE CHAMPIONS: Montreal, Nashua, Newport News, Trois-Rivières, Zanesville
