= 1946 New York Giants (MLB) season =

1946 New York Giants
- League: National League
- Ballpark: Polo Grounds
- City: New York City
- Record: 61–93 (.396)
- League place: 8th
- Owners: Horace Stoneham
- General managers: Chub Feeney
- Managers: Mel Ott
- Radio: WMCA (Jack Brickhouse, Steve Ellis)

The 1946 season was the 64th season of the New York Giants. The team finished in eighth place in the National League with a 61–93 record, 36 games behind the St. Louis Cardinals.

== Regular season ==
=== Season standings ===
National League
Team	W	L	Pct.	GB	Home	Road
St. Louis Cardinals	98	58	.628	—	49‍–‍29	49‍–‍29
Brooklyn Dodgers	96	60	.615	2	56‍–‍22	40‍–‍38
Chicago Cubs	82	71	.536	14½	44‍–‍33	38‍–‍38
Boston Braves	81	72	.529	15½	45‍–‍31	36‍–‍41
Philadelphia Phillies	69	85	.448	28	41‍–‍36	28‍–‍49
Cincinnati Reds	67	87	.435	30	35‍–‍42	32‍–‍45
Pittsburgh Pirates	63	91	.409	34	37‍–‍40	26‍–‍51
New York Giants	61	93	.396	36	38‍–‍39	23‍–‍54

The 1946 Giants are the original subject of the phrase "nice guys finish last", a condensation of a reference to them by Leo Durocher of the Brooklyn Dodgers. The original quote by Durocher was "The nice guys are all over there, in seventh place." (July 6, 1946), seventh place being second-to-last place in the National League consisting of eight teams.

=== Record vs. opponents ===
1946 National League record Sources:
Team	BSN	BRO	CHC	CIN	NYG	PHI	PIT	STL
Boston	—	5–17	12–9–1	15–7	13–9	14–8	15–7	7–15
Brooklyn	17–5	—	11–11	14–8–1	15–7	17–5	14–8	8–16
Chicago	9–12–1	11–11	—	13–9	17–5	12–10	12–10–1	8–14
Cincinnati	7–15	8–14–1	9–13	—	14–8	8–14–1	13–9	8–14
New York	9–13	7–15	5–17	8–14	—	12–10	10–12	10–12
Philadelphia	8–14	5–17	10–12	14–8–1	10–12	—	14–8	8–14
Pittsburgh	7–15	8–14	10–12–1	9–13	12–10	8–14	—	9–13
St. Louis	15–7	16–8	14–8	14–8	12–10	14–8	13–9	—

=== Notable transactions ===
- September 16, 1946: Red Kress was released by the Giants.

=== Roster ===
1946 New York Giants
Roster
Pitchers: 24 Woody Abernathy; 27 Ace Adams; 28 Nate Andrews; 21 Jack Brewer; 25 Mike Budnick; 16 John Carden; 20 Bob Carpenter; 29 Slim Emmerich; 14 Harry Feldman; 18 Rube Fischer; 12 Johnny Gee; 16 Marv Grissom; 28 Sheldon Jones; 24 Bob Joyce; 23 Monte Kennedy; 22 Dave Koslo; 14 Jack Kraus; 31 Red Kress; 9,13 Hal Schumacher; 42 Junior Thompson; 26 Ken Trinkle; 17 Bill Voiselle	Catchers: 7 Walker Cooper; 19 Jim Gladd; 29 Mickey Grasso; 9 Clyde Kluttz; 8 Ernie Lombardi; 36 Bennie Warren; Infielders: 32 Dick Bartell; 15 Buddy Blattner; 10 Buddy Kerr; -- Dick Lajeskie; 3 Johnny Mize; 1 Bill Rigney; 23 Bobby Thomson; 2 Mickey Witek; 5 Babe Young	Outfielders: 40 Morrie Arnovich; 9 Vince DiMaggio; 6 Sid Gordon; 18,21,28 Jack Graham; 29 Garland Lawing; 35 Willard Marshall; 41 Buster Maynard; 4 Mel Ott; 39 Jess Pike; 27 Goody Rosen; 37 Johnny Rucker; Other batters: 38 Mike Schemer	Manager: 4 Mel Ott; Coaches: 33 Grover Hartley; 30 Bubber Jonnard; 31 Red Kress

== Player stats ==
=== Batting ===
==== Starters by position ====
Note: Pos = Position; G = Games played; AB = At bats; H = Hits; Avg. = Batting average; HR = Home runs; RBI = Runs batted in

Pos	Player	G	AB	H	Avg.	HR	RBI
C	Walker Cooper	87	280	75	.268	8	46
1B	Johnny Mize	101	377	127	.337	22	70
2B	Buddy Blattner	126	420	107	.255	11	49
SS	Buddy Kerr	145	497	124	.249	6	40
3B	Bill Rigney	110	360	85	.236	3	31
OF	Sid Gordon	135	450	132	.293	5	45
OF	Willard Marshall	131	510	144	.282	13	48
OF	Goody Rosen	100	310	87	.281	5	30

==== Other batters ====
Note: G = Games played; AB = At bats; H = Hits; Avg. = Batting average; HR = Home runs; RBI = Runs batted in

Player	G	AB	H	Avg.	HR	RBI
Babe Young	104	291	81	.278	7	33
Mickey Witek	82	284	75	.264	4	29
Jack Graham	100	270	59	.219	14	47
Ernie Lombardi	88	238	69	.290	12	39
Johnny Rucker	95	197	52	.264	1	13
Bennie Warren	39	69	11	.159	4	8
Mel Ott	31	68	5	.074	1	4
Bobby Thomson	18	54	17	.315	2	9
Jess Pike	16	41	7	.171	1	6
Vince DiMaggio	15	25	0	.000	0	0
Mickey Grasso	7	22	3	.136	0	1
Garland Lawing	8	12	2	.167	0	0
Jim Gladd	4	11	1	.091	0	0
Dick Lajeskie	6	10	2	.200	0	0
Clyde Kluttz	5	8	3	.375	0	1
Buster Maynard	7	4	0	.000	0	0
Morrie Arnovich	1	3	0	.000	0	0
Dick Bartell	5	2	0	.000	0	0
Mike Schemer	1	1	0	.000	0	0

=== Pitching ===
==== Starting pitchers ====
Note: G = Games pitched; IP = Innings pitched; W = Wins; L = Losses; ERA = Earned run average; SO = Strikeouts

Player	G	IP	W	L	ERA	SO
Dave Koslo	40	265.1	14	19	3.63	121
Monty Kennedy	38	186.2	9	10	3.42	71
Bill Voiselle	36	178.0	9	15	3.74	89

==== Other pitchers ====
Note: G = Games pitched; IP = Innings pitched; W = Wins; L = Losses; ERA = Earned run average; SO = Strikeouts

Player	G	IP	W	L	ERA	SO
Ken Trinkle	48	151.0	7	14	3.87	49
Hal Schumacher	24	96.2	4	4	3.91	48
Mike Budnick	35	88.1	2	3	3.16	36
Bob Joyce	14	60.2	3	4	5.34	24
Johnny Gee	13	47.1	2	4	3.99	22
Bob Carpenter	12	39.0	1	3	4.85	13
Sheldon Jones	6	28.0	1	2	3.21	24
Marv Grissom	4	18.2	0	2	4.34	9
Nate Andrews	3	12.0	1	0	6.00	5
Harry Feldman	3	4.0	0	2	18.00	3

==== Relief pitchers ====
Note: G = Games pitched; W = Wins; L = Losses; SV = Saves; ERA = Earned run average; SO = Strikeouts

Player	G	W	L	SV	ERA	SO
Gene Thompson	39	4	6	4	1.29	31
Jack Kraus	17	2	1	0	6.12	7
Woody Abernathy	15	1	1	1	3.38	6
Rube Fischer	15	1	2	0	6.31	14
Ace Adams	3	0	1	0	16.88	3
Slim Emmerich	2	0	0	0	4.50	1
Red Kress	1	0	0	0	12.27	1
Jack Brewer	1	0	0	0	13.50	3
John Carden	1	0	0	0	22.50	1

== Farm system ==
Level	Team	League	Manager
AAA	Minneapolis Millers	American Association	Zeke Bonura, Rosy Ryan and Tom Sheehan
AAA	Jersey City Giants	International League	Bruno Betzel
A	Jacksonville Tars	Sally League	Johnny Hudson
B	Trenton Giants	Interstate League	Earl Wolgamot
B	Manchester Giants	New England League	Hal Gruber
B	Richmond Colts	Piedmont League	Ray Berres
B	Anderson A's	Tri-State League	Bob Richards
C	Danville-Scholfield Leafs	Carolina League	Herb Brett
C	Erie Sailors	Middle Atlantic League	Steve Mizerak
C	St. Cloud Rox	Northern League	Walter Kopp
C	Fort Smith Giants	Western Association	Hugh Willingham
D	Bristol Twins	Appalachian League	Donald Cross
D	Peekskill Highlanders	North Atlantic League	Tony Ravish
D	Hickory Rebels	North Carolina State League	Sammy Bell
D	Springfield Giants	Ohio State League	Donald Ramsay
D	Oshkosh Giants	Wisconsin State League	Ray Lucas

LEAGUE CHAMPIONS: Erie, Peekskill
