= 1946 Philadelphia Phillies season =

Major League Baseball season

1946 Philadelphia Phillies
- Also known as the Philadelphia Blue Jays
- League: National League
- Ballpark: Shibe Park
- City: Philadelphia
- Owners: R. R. M. Carpenter
- General managers: Herb Pennock
- Managers: Ben Chapman
- Radio: WIBG (By Saam, Claude Haring)

The 1946 Philadelphia Phillies season was the 64th season in the history of the franchise.

== Offseason ==
- Prior to the 1946 season: Stan Lopata was signed as an amateur free agent by the Phillies.

== Preseason ==
The Phillies held spring training in Miami Beach, Florida, returning to Flamingo Field where the team had trained from 1940 to 1942 before World War II travel restrictions kept teams close to home. The team stayed at the Boulevard Hotel at the corner of Dade Boulevard and Meridian Avenue.

The Phillies held minor league camp in Dover, Delaware.

== Regular season ==
For the first time in the 1946 season, the Philadelphia Phillies used airplanes to travel between cities during the regular season. The Phillies chartered two planes and returned to Philadelphia from Chicago following the scheduled June 12 game against the Cubs.

In June 1946, the Cleveland American League club was sold to Bill Veeck and a note appeared in the Sporting News that the team was considering a spring training move to Tucson, Arizona for 1947.

Paul Ficht, secretary of the Clearwater Chamber of Commerce, along with Mayor J.C. House, and city manager F.L. Hendrix spoke with the St. Louis Browns, Newark Bears, Kansas City Blues, and Phillies about training in Clearwater in 1947. On July 27, 1946, Hendrix announced that the Phillies had accepted Clearwater's invitation to train at Clearwater Athletic Field in 1947 on a one-year agreement.

=== Season standings ===
National League
Team	W	L	Pct.	GB	Home	Road
St. Louis Cardinals	98	58	.628	—	49‍–‍29	49‍–‍29
Brooklyn Dodgers	96	60	.615	2	56‍–‍22	40‍–‍38
Chicago Cubs	82	71	.536	14½	44‍–‍33	38‍–‍38
Boston Braves	81	72	.529	15½	45‍–‍31	36‍–‍41
Philadelphia Phillies	69	85	.448	28	41‍–‍36	28‍–‍49
Cincinnati Reds	67	87	.435	30	35‍–‍42	32‍–‍45
Pittsburgh Pirates	63	91	.409	34	37‍–‍40	26‍–‍51
New York Giants	61	93	.396	36	38‍–‍39	23‍–‍54

=== Record vs. opponents ===
1946 National League record Sources:
Team	BSN	BRO	CHC	CIN	NYG	PHI	PIT	STL
Boston	—	5–17	12–9–1	15–7	13–9	14–8	15–7	7–15
Brooklyn	17–5	—	11–11	14–8–1	15–7	17–5	14–8	8–16
Chicago	9–12–1	11–11	—	13–9	17–5	12–10	12–10–1	8–14
Cincinnati	7–15	8–14–1	9–13	—	14–8	8–14–1	13–9	8–14
New York	9–13	7–15	5–17	8–14	—	12–10	10–12	10–12
Philadelphia	8–14	5–17	10–12	14–8–1	10–12	—	14–8	8–14
Pittsburgh	7–15	8–14	10–12–1	9–13	12–10	8–14	—	9–13
St. Louis	15–7	16–8	14–8	14–8	12–10	14–8	13–9	—

=== Roster ===
1946 Philadelphia Phillies
Roster
Pitchers: 7 Ben Chapman; 30 Blix Donnelly; 43 Don Grate; 12 Eli Hodkey; 22 Lefty Hoerst; 28 Tommy Hughes; 40 Johnny Humphries; 20 Si Johnson; 17 Oscar Judd; 38 Al Jurisich; 33 Andy Karl; -- Dick Koecher; 32 Art Lopatka; 15 Dick Mauney; 39 Al Milnar; 48 Hugh Mulcahy; 10 Dick Mulligan; 21 Ike Pearson; 39,35 Lou Possehl; 16 Ken Raffensberger; 8 Charlie Ripple; 19 Schoolboy Rowe; 18 Charley Schanz; 42 Charley Stanceu	Catchers: 47,2 Rollie Hemsley; 46 Dee Moore; 24 Andy Seminick; 23 Hal Spindel; Infielders: -- Bill Burich; 41,47 Vance Dinges; 37 Granny Hamner; 40 Don Hasenmayer; 6 Roy Hughes; 23,49 Charlie Letchas; 26 Frank McCormick; 9 Danny Murtaugh; 29 Skeeter Newsome; 27 John O'Neil; 2 Ken Richardson; 5 Jim Tabor; 50,9 Emil Verban	Outfielders: 34 Vince DiMaggio; 14 Del Ennis; 21 Charlie Gilbert; 30,4 Ron Northey; 39 Lou Novikoff; 3 Jimmy Wasdell; 1 Johnny Wyrostek; Other batters: 43 Glenn Crawford	Manager: 7 Ben Chapman; Coaches: 11 Benny Bengough; 25 Benny Culp; 31 Cy Perkins

== Player stats ==
=== Batting ===
==== Starters by position ====
Note: Pos = Position; G = Games played; AB = At bats; H = Hits; Avg. = Batting average; HR = Home runs; RBI = Runs batted in

Pos	Player	G	AB	H	Avg.	HR	RBI
C	Andy Seminick	124	406	107	.264	12	52
1B	Frank McCormick	135	504	143	.284	11	66
2B	Emil Verban	138	473	130	.275	0	34
SS	Skeeter Newsome	112	375	87	.232	1	23
3B	Jim Tabor	124	463	124	.268	10	50
OF	Ron Northey	128	438	109	.249	16	62
OF	Del Ennis	141	540	169	.313	17	73
OF	Johnny Wyrostek	145	545	153	.281	6	45

==== Other batters ====
Note: G = Games played; AB = At bats; H = Hits; Avg. = Batting average; HR = Home runs; RBI = Runs batted in

Player	G	AB	H	Avg.	HR	RBI
Roy Hughes	89	276	65	.236	0	22
Charlie Gilbert	88	260	63	.242	1	17
Rollie Hemsley	49	139	31	.223	0	11
Vance Dinges	50	104	32	.308	1	10
John O'Neil	46	94	25	.266	0	9
Jimmy Wasdell	26	51	13	.255	1	5
Lou Novikoff	17	23	7	.304	0	3
Ken Richardson	6	20	3	.150	0	2
Danny Murtaugh	6	19	4	.211	1	3
Vince DiMaggio	6	19	4	.211	0	1
Dee Moore	11	13	1	.077	0	1
Charlie Letchas	6	13	3	.231	0	0
Don Hasenmayer	6	12	1	.083	0	0
Granny Hamner	2	7	1	.143	0	0
Hal Spindel	1	3	1	.333	0	1
Glenn Crawford	1	1	0	.000	0	0
Bill Burich	2	1	0	.000	0	0

=== Pitching ===
==== Starting pitchers ====
Note: G = Games pitched; IP = Innings pitched; W = Wins; L = Losses; ERA = Earned run average; SO = Strikeouts

Player	G	IP	W	L	ERA	SO
Ken Raffensberger	39	196.0	8	15	3.63	73
Oscar Judd	30	173.1	11	12	3.53	65
Schoolboy Rowe	17	136.0	11	4	2.12	51
Blix Donnelly	12	76.1	3	4	2.95	38
Charley Stanceu	14	70.1	2	4	4.22	23
Al Jurisich	13	68.1	4	3	3.69	34
Lou Possehl	4	13.2	1	2	5.93	4
Dick Koecher	1	2.2	0	1	10.13	2
Al Milnar	1	0	0	0	inf	0

==== Other pitchers ====
Note: G = Games pitched; IP = Innings pitched; W = Wins; L = Losses; ERA = Earned run average; SO = Strikeouts

Player	G	IP	W	L	ERA	SO
Charley Schanz	32	116.1	6	6	5.80	47
Tommy Hughes	29	111.0	6	9	4.38	34
Dick Mauney	24	90.0	6	4	2.70	31
Lefty Hoerst	18	68.1	1	6	4.61	17
Hugh Mulcahy	16	62.2	2	4	4.45	12
Dick Mulligan	19	54.2	2	2	4.77	16
Ike Pearson	5	14.1	1	0	3.77	6
Art Lopatka	4	5.1	0	1	16.88	4
Eli Hodkey	2	4.1	0	1	12.46	0

==== Relief pitchers ====
Note: G = Games pitched; W = Wins; L = Losses; SV = Saves; ERA = Earned run average; SO = Strikeouts

Player	G	W	L	SV	ERA	SO
Andy Karl	39	3	7	5	4.96	15
Johnny Humphries	10	0	0	0	4.01	10
Charlie Ripple	6	1	0	0	10.80	3
Don Grate	3	1	0	0	1.12	2
Si Johnson	1	0	0	0	3.00	2
Ben Chapman	1	0	0	0	0.00	1

== Farm system ==
Level	Team	League	Manager
A	Utica Blue Sox	Eastern League	Eddie Sawyer
B	Terre Haute Phillies	Illinois–Indiana–Iowa League	Ray Brubaker
B	Wilmington Blue Rocks	Interstate League	Jack Saltzgaver
C	Schenectady Blue Jays	Canadian–American League	Bill Cronin
C	Salina Blue Jays	Western Association	Ed Walls
D	Dover Phillies	Eastern Shore League	John Lehman
D	Americus Phillies	Georgia–Florida League	Jack Sanford
D	Bradford Blue Wings	PONY League	Leon Riley
D	Green Bay Bluejays	Wisconsin State League	Harry Griswold
