= 1946 St. Louis Cardinals season =

Major League Baseball season

1946 St. Louis Cardinals
- World Series champions National League champions
- League: National League
- Ballpark: Sportsman's Park
- City: St. Louis, Missouri
- Record: 96–58 (.628)
- League place: 1st
- Owners: Sam Breadon
- General managers: William Walsingham Jr.
- Managers: Eddie Dyer
- Radio: WIL (Dizzy Dean, Johnny O'Hara); WTMV/WEW (Harry Caray, Gabby Street)
- Stats: ESPN.com; Baseball Reference

The 1946 St. Louis Cardinals season was a season in American baseball. It was the team's 65th season in St. Louis, Missouri and their 55th season in the National League. The Cardinals went 96–58 during the championship season and finished tied with the Brooklyn Dodgers for first in the National League. St. Louis then won a best-of-three playoff for the pennant, two games to none. In the World Series, they won in seven games over the Boston Red Sox. They won on Enos Slaughter's "mad dash" that gave them a 4–3 lead in the eighth inning of game 7.

== Offseason ==
- Prior to 1946 season: Solly Hemus was signed as an amateur free agent by the Cardinals.

== Regular season ==
First baseman Stan Musial won the MVP Award this year, batting .365, with 16 home runs and 103 RBIs.

=== Season standings ===
National League
| Team | W | L | Pct. | GB | Home | Road |
|---|---|---|---|---|---|---|
| St. Louis Cardinals | 98 | 58 | .628 | — | 49‍–‍29 | 49‍–‍29 |
| Brooklyn Dodgers | 96 | 60 | .615 | 2 | 56‍–‍22 | 40‍–‍38 |
| Chicago Cubs | 82 | 71 | .536 | 14½ | 44‍–‍33 | 38‍–‍38 |
| Boston Braves | 81 | 72 | .529 | 15½ | 45‍–‍31 | 36‍–‍41 |
| Philadelphia Phillies | 69 | 85 | .448 | 28 | 41‍–‍36 | 28‍–‍49 |
| Cincinnati Reds | 67 | 87 | .435 | 30 | 35‍–‍42 | 32‍–‍45 |
| Pittsburgh Pirates | 63 | 91 | .409 | 34 | 37‍–‍40 | 26‍–‍51 |
| New York Giants | 61 | 93 | .396 | 36 | 38‍–‍39 | 23‍–‍54 |

=== Record vs. opponents ===
1946 National League record Sources:
| Team | BSN | BRO | CHC | CIN | NYG | PHI | PIT | STL |
|---|---|---|---|---|---|---|---|---|
| Boston | — | 5–17 | 12–9–1 | 15–7 | 13–9 | 14–8 | 15–7 | 7–15 |
| Brooklyn | 17–5 | — | 11–11 | 14–8–1 | 15–7 | 17–5 | 14–8 | 8–16 |
| Chicago | 9–12–1 | 11–11 | — | 13–9 | 17–5 | 12–10 | 12–10–1 | 8–14 |
| Cincinnati | 7–15 | 8–14–1 | 9–13 | — | 14–8 | 8–14–1 | 13–9 | 8–14 |
| New York | 9–13 | 7–15 | 5–17 | 8–14 | — | 12–10 | 10–12 | 10–12 |
| Philadelphia | 8–14 | 5–17 | 10–12 | 14–8–1 | 10–12 | — | 14–8 | 8–14 |
| Pittsburgh | 7–15 | 8–14 | 10–12–1 | 9–13 | 12–10 | 8–14 | — | 9–13 |
| St. Louis | 15–7 | 16–8 | 14–8 | 14–8 | 12–10 | 14–8 | 13–9 | — |

=== Notable transactions ===
- July 1946: Jim Gleeson was traded by the Cardinals to the Boston Red Sox for Don Lang and Bill Howerton.

=== Roster ===
1946 St. Louis Cardinals
Roster
| Pitchers: 13 Red Barrett; 21,27 Johnny Beazley; 16,27,36 Al Brazle; 31 Harry Brecheen; 10 Ken Burkhart; 22 Murry Dickson; 20 Blix Donnelly; 33 Johnny Grodzicki; 29 Howie Krist; 21 Max Lanier; 34 Fred Martin; 20 Red Munger; 11 Howie Pollet; 37 Freddy Schmidt; 28 Ted Wilks | Catchers: 17 Joe Garagiola; 39 Clyde Kluttz; 16 Ken O'Dea; 18 Del Rice; 23 Del Wilber; Infielders: 35 Jeff Cross; 7 Nippy Jones; 7 Lou Klein; 1 Whitey Kurowski; 4 Marty Marion; 6 Stan Musial; 2 Red Schoendienst; 15 Dick Sisler | Outfielders: 14 Buster Adams; 19 Erv Dusak; 24 Bill Endicott; 8 Terry Moore; 9 Enos Slaughter; 5,17 Harry Walker; Other batters: 42 Danny Litwhiler; 38 Walter Sessi; 3 Emil Verban | Manager: 30 Eddie Dyer; Coaches: 25 Mike González; 26 Buzzy Wares |

== Player stats ==
| = Indicates team leader |

| = Indicates league leader |

=== Batting ===
==== Starters by position ====
Note: Pos = Position; G = Games played; AB = At bats; H = Hits; Avg. = Batting average; HR = Home runs; RBI = Runs batted in

| Pos | Player | G | AB | H | Avg. | HR | RBI |
|---|---|---|---|---|---|---|---|
| C | Joe Garagiola | 74 | 211 | 50 | .237 | 3 | 22 |
| 1B | Stan Musial | 156 | 624 | 228 | .365 | 16 | 103 |
| 2B | Red Schoendienst | 142 | 606 | 170 | .281 | 0 | 34 |
| 3B | Whitey Kurowski | 142 | 519 | 156 | .301 | 14 | 89 |
| SS | Marty Marion | 146 | 498 | 116 | .233 | 3 | 46 |
| OF | Harry Walker | 112 | 346 | 82 | .237 | 3 | 27 |
| OF | Erv Dusak | 100 | 275 | 66 | .240 | 9 | 42 |
| OF | Enos Slaughter | 156 | 609 | 183 | .300 | 18 | 130 |

==== Other batters ====
Note: G = Games played; AB = At bats; H = Hits; Avg. = Batting average; HR = Home runs; RBI = Runs batted in

| Player | G | AB | H | Avg. | HR | RBI |
|---|---|---|---|---|---|---|
| Terry Moore | 91 | 278 | 73 | .263 | 3 | 2 |
| Dick Sisler | 83 | 235 | 61 | .260 | 3 | 42 |
| Buster Adams | 81 | 173 | 32 | .185 | 5 | 22 |
| Del Rice | 55 | 139 | 38 | .273 | 1 | 12 |
| Clyde Kluttz | 52 | 136 | 36 | .265 | 0 | 14 |
| Lou Klein | 23 | 93 | 18 | .194 | 1 | 4 |
| Jeff Cross | 49 | 69 | 15 | .217 | 0 | 6 |
| Ken O'Dea | 22 | 57 | 7 | .123 | 1 | 3 |
| Bill Endicott | 20 | 20 | 4 | .200 | 0 | 3 |
| Walter Sessi | 15 | 14 | 2 | .143 | 1 | 2 |
| Nippy Jones | 16 | 12 | 4 | .333 | 0 | 1 |
| Danny Litwhiler | 6 | 5 | 0 | .000 | 0 | 0 |
| Del Wilber | 4 | 4 | 0 | .000 | 0 | 0 |
| Emil Verban | 1 | 1 | 0 | .000 | 0 | 0 |

=== Pitching ===
==== Starting pitchers ====
Note: G = Games pitched; IP = Innings pitched; W = Wins; L = Losses; ERA = Earned run average; SO = Strikeouts

| Player | G | IP | W | L | ERA | SO |
|---|---|---|---|---|---|---|
| Howie Pollet | 40 | 266.0 | 21 | 10 | 2.10 | 107 |
| Harry Brecheen | 36 | 231.0 | 15 | 15 | 2.49 | 117 |
| Johnny Beazley | 19 | 103.0 | 7 | 5 | 4.46 | 36 |
| Max Lanier | 6 | 56.0 | 6 | 0 | 1.93 | 36 |
| Red Munger | 10 | 48.2 | 2 | 2 | 3.33 | 28 |

- Note: Pollet was team leader in saves with 5.

==== Other pitchers ====
Note: G = Games pitched; IP = Innings pitched; W = Wins; L = Losses; ERA = Earned run average; SO = Strikeouts

| Player | G | IP | W | L | ERA | SO |
|---|---|---|---|---|---|---|
| Murry Dickson | 47 | 184.1 | 15 | 6 | 2.88 | 82 |
| Al Brazle | 37 | 153.1 | 11 | 10 | 3.29 | 58 |
| Ken Burkhart | 25 | 100.0 | 6 | 3 | 2.88 | 32 |
| Red Barrett | 23 | 67.0 | 3 | 2 | 4.03 | 22 |
| Fred Martin | 6 | 28.2 | 2 | 1 | 4.08 | 19 |

==== Relief pitchers ====
Note: G = Games pitched; W = Wins; L = Losses; SV = Saves; ERA = Earned run average; SO = Strikeouts

| Player | G | W | L | SV | ERA | SO |
|---|---|---|---|---|---|---|
| Ted Wilks | 40 | 8 | 0 | 1 | 3.41 | 40 |
| Freddy Schmidt | 16 | 1 | 0 | 0 | 3.29 | 14 |
| Howie Krist | 15 | 0 | 2 | 0 | 6.75 | 3 |
| Blix Donnelly | 13 | 1 | 2 | 0 | 3.95 | 11 |
| Johnny Grodzicki | 3 | 0 | 0 | 0 | 9.00 | 2 |

== 1946 World Series ==
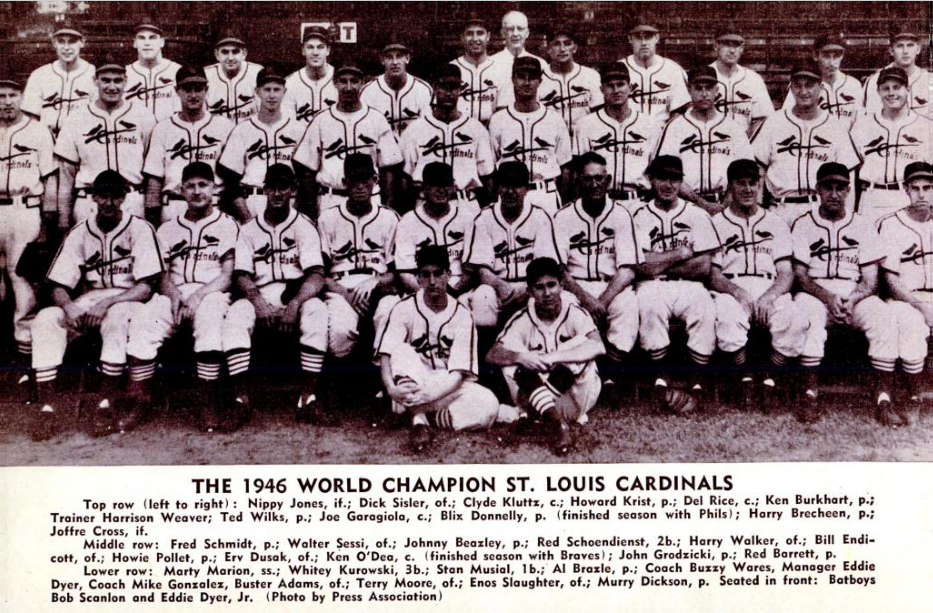

NL St. Louis Cardinals (4) vs. AL Boston Red Sox (3)

| Game | Score | Date | Attendance |
|---|---|---|---|
| 1 | Boston 3, St. Louis 2 (10 innings) | October 6 | 36,218 |
| 2 | St. Louis 3, Boston 0 | October 7 | 35,815 |
| 3 | Boston 4, St. Louis 0 | October 9 | 34,500 |
| 4 | St. Louis 12, Boston 3 | October 10 | 35,645 |
| 5 | Boston 6, St. Louis 3 | October 11 | 35,982 |
| 6 | St. Louis 4, Boston 1 | October 13 | 35,768 |
| 7 | St. Louis 4, Boston 3 | October 15 | 36,143 |

== Awards and honors ==
- Stan Musial, National League leader, Triples, (20).

== Farm system ==
| Level | Team | League | Manager |
|---|---|---|---|
| AAA | Columbus Red Birds | American Association | Charlie Root |
| AAA | Rochester Red Wings | International League | Burleigh Grimes and Benny Borgmann |
| AA | Houston Buffaloes | Texas League | Johnny Keane |
| A | Columbus Cardinals | Sally League | Kemp Wicker |
| B | Decatur Commodores | Illinois–Indiana–Iowa League | Harrison Wickel |
| B | Allentown Cardinals | Interstate League | Ollie Vanek |
| B | Lynchburg Cardinals | Piedmont League | Wes Ferrell |
| C | Fresno Cardinals | California League | Everett Johnston and Paul Bowa |
| C | Winston-Salem Cardinals | Carolina League | Zip Payne |
| C | Duluth Dukes | Northern League | Mercer Harris and Gene Sack |
| C | Pocatello Cardinals | Pioneer League | Bill Brenzel |
| C | St. Joseph Cardinals | Western Association | Bob Stanton |
| D | Johnson City Cardinals | Appalachian League | Specs Garbee |
| D | Salisbury Cardinals | Eastern Shore League | Harold Contini |
| D | Albany Cardinals | Georgia–Florida League | Herb Moore |
| D | Carthage Cardinals | Kansas–Oklahoma–Missouri League | Buzz Arlitt |
| D | Marion Cardinals | Ohio State League | Wally Schang and Bob Kline |
| D | Hamilton Cardinals | PONY League | John Newman |
