= Chuck Workman (baseball) =

American baseball player (1915–1953)

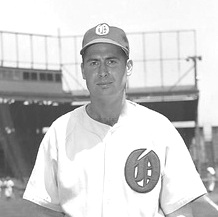
- Workman, circa 1947
- Right fielder / Third baseman
- Born: January 6, 1915; Leeton, Missouri, U.S.
- Died: January 3, 1953 (aged 37); Kansas City, Missouri, U.S.
- Batted: Left Threw: Right

MLB debut
- September 18, 1938, for the Cleveland Indians

Last MLB appearance
- September 27, 1946, for the Pittsburgh Pirates

MLB statistics
- Batting average: .242
- Home runs: 50
- Runs batted in: 230
- Stats at Baseball Reference

Teams
- Cleveland Indians (1938, 1941); Boston Braves (1943–1946); Pittsburgh Pirates (1946)

Charles Thomas Workman (January 6, 1915 – January 3, 1953) was an American professional baseball player. A left-handed hitter who threw right-handed, Workman played all or part of six seasons in Major League Baseball for the Cleveland Indians, Boston Braves and Pittsburgh Pirates, most often as a right fielder or third baseman. The native of Leeton, Missouri, stood 6 feet (1.8 m) tall and weighed 175 pounds (79 kg).

== Career ==
Workman entered pro ball in 1937 in the minor leagues in the Class C Middle Atlantic League. After a banner year in 1938, when he batted .364 and was named an outfielder on the Middle Atlantic circuit's All-Star team, he made his MLB debut on September 18, 1938, with the Indians at age 23. But Cleveland would only give Workman one further brief look, at the outset of the 1941 campaign, and that year he was acquired by the Nashville Volunteers, where, playing in Sulphur Dell, a haven for left-handed hitters, he would enjoy his greatest success later in the 1940s.

After Workman hit .326 and led the Southern Association with 29 home runs for Nashville in 1942, the Braves obtained his services. The Braves' regular right fielder in 1942, veteran future Hall of Famer Paul Waner, was released in January, and Workman was given the starting job, which he held in 1943 and 1944. In 1943, he hit .249 in 615 at bats in 153 games, but the next year, Workman's batting average declined to .208 in 418 at bats in 140 games. In 1945, Workman had his breakout year. With the Braves continuing to lose players to World War II service, a vacancy opened at third base when Dee Phillips joined the United States Army. Workman was moved to Phillips' old position, with center fielder Tommy Holmes moved to right and Carden Gillenwater brought in to play center. The change in position seemed to agree with Workman, as he hit .274 with 25 home runs, both career best marks. His home run total placed him second in the National League, and first in home runs per at bat (one for every 20.560). Workman's batting average was third-best on his team.

But, in 1946, Workman got off to a slow start, hitting only .167 in his first 48 at bats. The Braves traded him on June 12 to the Pittsburgh Pirates for Johnny Barrett. In Pittsburgh, Workman hit .221 in 145 at bats. It was his final season in the major leagues. However, he was able to return to Nashville in 1948 and the cozy confines of Sulphur Dell, where he won the Southern Association's Most Valuable Player Award, leading the Double-A circuit in home runs (52) and amassing 182 runs batted in, which set a new league mark. Although Workman hit .353 that year, he was 33 points behind the league's batting champion, teammate Smoky Burgess, who hit .386. The following season, Workman clubbed 41 homers for the 1949 Minneapolis Millers to lead the Triple-A American Association, but it did not earn him a recall to the majors. He played the 1950 and 1951 seasons in the minors, then retired from pro baseball.

As a major leaguer, Workman had a career batting average of .242 with 423 hits in 526 games, including 57 doubles, seven triples, 50 home runs, and 230 RBI. His lifetime fielding percentage was .959. Chuck Workman died from a bleeding ulcer in Kansas City, Missouri, three days before his 38th birthday.
