= Koecher =

Koecher or Köcher may refer to:

- Dick Koecher (born 1926), American former professional baseball pitcher
- Karl Koecher (born 1934), Czechoslovak spy, the only mole known to have penetrated the CIA
- Max Koecher (1924–1990), German mathematician
- Steven Koecher (born 1979), American man missing since 2009
