= Albosta =

Albosta is a surname. Notable people with the surname include:

- Donald J. Albosta (1925–2014), American farmer, businessman, and politician
- Ed Albosta (1918–2003), American baseball pitcher
