= John O'Neil (baseball) =

American baseball player (1920–2012)

- Shortstop
- Born: April 19, 1920; Shelbiana, Kentucky, U.S.
- Died: April 18, 2012 (aged 91); Jamestown, New York, U.S.
- Batted: Right Threw: Right

MLB debut
- April 16, 1946, for the Philadelphia Phillies

Last MLB appearance
- September 29, 1946, for the Philadelphia Phillies

MLB statistics
- Batting average: .266
- Home runs: 0
- Runs batted in: 9
- Stats at Baseball Reference

Teams
- Philadelphia Phillies (1946)

John Francis O'Neil (April 19, 1920 – April 18, 2012) was an American shortstop in Major League Baseball who played briefly during the 1946 season. Listed at 5 ft 9 in (1.75 m), 155 lb, he batted and threw right-handed.

Born in Shelbiana, Kentucky, John O'Neil was involved in professional baseball for more than 45 years spanning 1939–1986 as player, manager, player/manager, general manager and scout, while participating in over 1,800 minor league games.

O'Neil assumed the name "Charles R. Johnson" as a college baseball player at Pikeville Junior College in order to maintain his amateur status while playing minor league baseball.

O'Neil appeared in 32 games for the 1946 Philadelphia Phillies as a replacement for everyday shortstop Skeeter Newsome, being also used in pinch-hitting and pinch-running situations in 14 games.

In a 46-game career, O'Neil posted a batting average of .266 (25-for-94) with three doubles, driving in nine runs while scoring 12 times without any stolen base.

From 1964 through 1984 he scouted for several major league teams, including the Milwaukee and Atlanta Braves teams and Los Angeles Dodgers. Two of the players he scouted and signed were catcher Mike Scioscia and outfielder Bill Robinson.

O'Neil was honored by the Chautauqua Sports Hall of Fame at Russell Diethrick Park in the summer of 2011 with a white Jamestown Falcons uniform top with No. 1 on his back, similar to the uniform he wore back in the 1940s. It was during the 70th anniversary of the park, previously known as Municipal Stadium, and O'Neil, lone survivor of the 1941 Jamestown club, was honored by throwing out the inaugural first pitch. He later received honors as the oldest Chautauqua Sports Hall of Fame Inductee at the organization's 31st annual induction dinner on February 20, 2012.

Outside of baseball, he was an avid golfer and fisherman with memberships at Chautauqua and Corry Hills golf clubs, and was also a member of Lakewood Rod and Gun Club.

O'Neil died in Jamestown, New York, one day short of reaching his 92nd birthday.
