= Mike Budnick =

American baseball player (1919–1999)

- Pitcher
- Born: September 15, 1919; Astoria, Oregon, U.S.
- Died: December 2, 1999 (aged 80); Seattle, Washington, U.S.
- Batted: Right Threw: Right

MLB debut
- April 18, 1946, for the New York Giants

Last MLB appearance
- June 22, 1947, for the New York Giants

MLB statistics
- Win–loss record: 2–3
- Earned run average: 4.04
- Strikeouts: 42
- Stats at Baseball Reference

Teams
- New York Giants (1946–1947)

Michael Joe Budnick (September 15, 1919 – December 2, 1999) was an American professional baseball player, a right-handed pitcher who appeared in 42 games, eight as a starter, in the Major Leagues from 1946–1947 for the New York Giants. The native of Astoria, Oregon, grew up in Seattle, Washington, where he attended Queen Anne High School. He stood 6 feet 1 inch (1.85 m) tall and weighed 200 pounds (91 kg).

Budnick's professional career lasted for nine seasons (1939–1942; 1946–1950), interrupted by service in the United States Navy in the Pacific Theater of Operations during World War II.

He spent the entire 1946 campaign on the Giants' roster, compiling a 2–3 record and a creditable 3.16 earned run average in 35 games. On August 4, 1946, he started against the Pittsburgh Pirates at the Polo Grounds and hurled his only MLB complete game and shutout, winning 6–0.

Altogether, Budnick allowed 91 hits and 58 bases on balls in 100 1/3 MLB innings pitched, with 42 strikeouts.
