= Art Lopatka =

American baseball player (1919–2007)

- Pitcher
- Born: May 28, 1919; Chicago, Illinois, U.S.
- Died: March 10, 2007 (aged 87); Elk Grove Village, Illinois, U.S.
- Batted: Switch Threw: Left

MLB debut
- September 12, 1945, for the St. Louis Cardinals

Last MLB appearance
- July 1, 1946, for the Philadelphia Phillies

MLB statistics
- Win–loss record: 1–1
- Earned run average: 6.35
- Innings pitched: 17
- Stats at Baseball Reference

Teams
- St. Louis Cardinals (1945); Philadelphia Phillies (1946)

Arthur Joseph Lopatka (May 28, 1919 – March 10, 2007) was an American professional baseball player, a left-handed pitcher who worked in eight total games in the Major Leagues for the 1945 St. Louis Cardinals and the 1946 Philadelphia Phillies. The native of Chicago, stood 5 feet 10 inches (1.78 m) tall and weighed 170 pounds (77 kg).

Lopatka's professional career began in 1942 in the Cardinals' farm system. A switch-hitter, he also played the outfield in the minors and batted .356 (with 26 hits in 73 at bats) for the 1944 Columbus Red Birds of the top-level American Association.

Lopatka was recalled by the Cardinals in the closing weeks of the 1945 season. In his Major League debut on September 12, he drew the starting assignment against the Brooklyn Dodgers and pitched a complete game, four-hit 3–2 victory at Sportsman's Park, defeating the Dodgers' Ralph Branca. That would represent Lopatka's only Major League victory. He worked in three more games for St. Louis in relief in 1945, then was waived to the Phillies prior to the start of the 1946 campaign. He pitched infrequently and ineffectively for the Phils. In his fourth and final appearance on July 1, 1946, he once again started against the Dodgers, but this time he lasted only one-third of an inning and was charged with three earned runs, taking his second decision and first loss as Brooklyn won 11–6.

In his eight MLB games, Lopatka allowed 20 hits, seven bases on balls, and 12 earned runs in 17 innings pitched. He left baseball after the 1946 campaign.
