= Otis Davis (baseball) =

American baseball player (1920–2007)

- Pinch runner
- Born: September 24, 1920; Charleston, Arkansas, U.S.
- Died: July 23, 2007 (aged 86); Clearwater, Florida, U.S.
- Batted: Left Threw: Right

MLB debut
- April 22, 1946, for the Brooklyn Dodgers

Last MLB appearance
- April 22, 1946, for the Brooklyn Dodgers

MLB statistics
- Games played: 1
- Runs scored: 1
- Stats at Baseball Reference

Teams
- Brooklyn Dodgers (1946)

Otis Allen Davis (September 24, 1920 – July 23, 2007) was an American Major League Baseball player for the Brooklyn Dodgers in 1946. Davis, whose nickname was "Scat", made just one appearance as a pinch runner on April 22 against the Boston Braves at Ebbets Field.

In the bottom of the ninth inning, with Brooklyn trailing 4–2, leadoff man Eddie Stanky, pinch hitting, drew a base on balls, and Davis ran for him. He moved to second base when the next hitter, Bob Ramazzotti, also walked, then he was sacrifice bunted to third by Billy Herman. The next Dodger hitter, Pete Reiser, doubled to score both Davis and Ramazzotti, tying the game at four. The game went into extra innings, and Brooklyn won it in its half of the tenth frame, 5–4.

Born in Charleston, Arkansas, Davis batted left-handed and threw right-handed; he was listed as 6 feet (1.8 m) tall and 160 pounds (73 kg). He was an outfielder in the minor leagues from 1942 to 1948 and finished his career as the manager of the Abilene Blue Sox of the West Texas–New Mexico League in 1948.
