= Peaches Graham =

American baseball player (1877–1939)

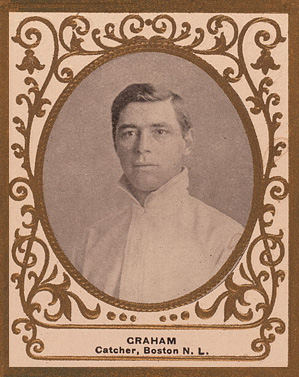
- Catcher
- Born: March 23, 1877; Aledo, Illinois, U.S.
- Died: July 25, 1939 (aged 62); Long Beach, California, U.S.
- Batted: Right Threw: Right

MLB debut
- September 14, 1902, for the Cleveland Bronchos

Last MLB appearance
- June 18, 1912, for the Philadelphia Phillies

MLB statistics
- Batting average: .265
- Home runs: 1
- Runs batted in: 85
- Stats at Baseball Reference

Teams
- Cleveland Bronchos (1902); Chicago Cubs (1903); Boston Doves/Rustlers (1908–11); Chicago Cubs (1911); Philadelphia Phillies (1912)

George Frederick "Peaches" Graham (March 23, 1877 – July 25, 1939) was an American professional baseball catcher for the Cleveland Bronchos, Chicago Cubs, Boston Doves/Rustlers, and Philadelphia Phillies.

Born in Aledo, Illinois, Graham played seven seasons of Major League Baseball over the span of eleven years. He debuted in 1902 with the Bronchos as a second baseman, and came back in 1903 with the Cubs as a pitcher, but only pitched in one game, a loss. After a five-year hiatus, Graham returned in 1908 as a utility player with the Braves. He started games as a catcher, second baseman, outfielder, third baseman, and shortstop, but was predominantly a catcher. Graham was traded mid-season 1911 to the Cubs, but only played there for three months before being traded for Dick Cotter to Philadelphia, where he would finish his major league career after the 1912 season at the age of thirty-five.

He had a son, Jack, born in 1916, who would go on to play professional baseball. Graham died in Long Beach, California at the age of sixty-two.
