= Ken O'Dea =

American baseball player (1913–1985)

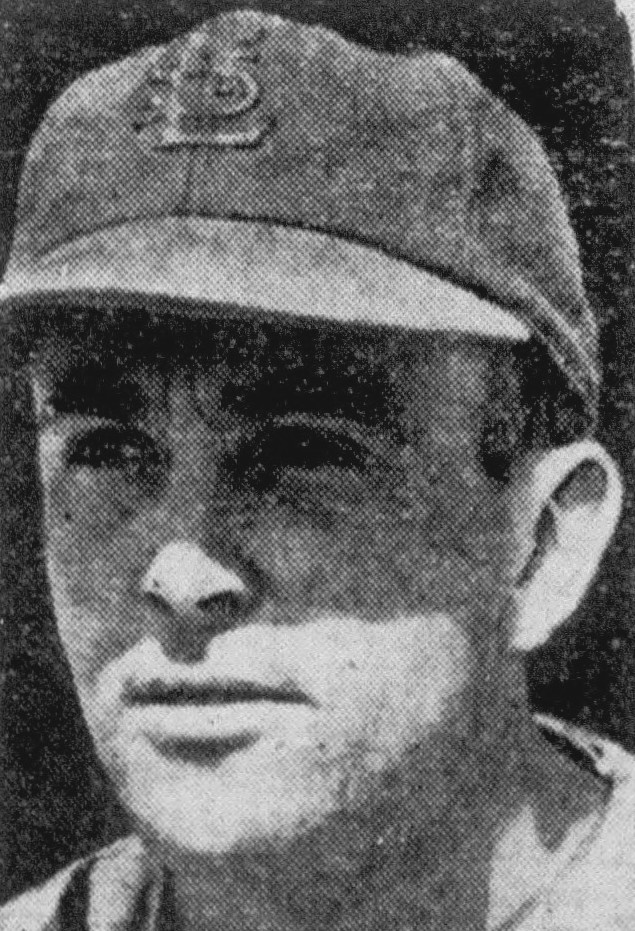
- O'Dea, circa 1944
- Catcher
- Born: March 16, 1913; Lima, New York, U.S.
- Died: December 17, 1985 (aged 72); Lima, New York, U.S.
- Batted: Left Threw: Right

MLB debut
- April 21, 1935, for the Chicago Cubs

Last MLB appearance
- August 6, 1946, for the Boston Braves

MLB statistics
- Batting average: .255
- Home runs: 40
- Runs batted in: 323
- Stats at Baseball Reference

Teams
- Chicago Cubs (1935–1938); New York Giants (1939–1941); St. Louis Cardinals (1942–1946); Boston Braves (1946)

Career highlights and awards
- All-Star (1945); 2× World Series champion (1942, 1944)

James Kenneth O'Dea (March 16, 1913 – December 17, 1985) was an American professional baseball player. He played in Major League Baseball (MLB) as a catcher for the Chicago Cubs (1935–38), New York Giants (1939–41), St. Louis Cardinals (1942–46), and Boston Braves (1946).

O'Dea had the misfortune of playing on the same teams alongside some of the best catchers in the National League, which limited his playing time. Although he played most of his 12-year MLB career as a backup catcher, O'Dea was considered one of the best defensive catchers in the major leagues prior to World War II.

== Baseball career ==
=== Minor league ===
O'Dea was born on March 16, 1913, in Lima, New York, to an Irish father and an Irish American mother. O'Dea began his baseball career at the age of 18 in 1931 with the Greensboro Patriots of the Piedmont League. He produced a .333 batting average while playing for the Keokuk Indians in 1932. Although his hitting would taper off, it was his defensive abilities as a catcher that made him stand out. He played in the minor leagues for four years. O'Dea had four athletic brothers, two of whom made the minor leagues as well.

=== Major league ===
O'Dea made his MLB debut with the Chicago Cubs on April 21, 1935, at the age of 22. O'Dea performed respectably for the Cubs, serving as a backup catcher to future Baseball Hall of Fame member, Gabby Hartnett. When Hartnett was injured in 1936, O'Dea filled in with solid defensive play as well as hitting for a .307 batting average in 80 games. In 1937, he hit for a .301 average in 83 games. On December 6, 1938, the Cubs traded him along with Frank Demaree and Billy Jurges to the New York Giants for Dick Bartell, Hank Leiber and catcher Gus Mancuso. With the Giants, O'Dea would once again be forced into a substitute role, as he backed up four-time All-Star Harry Danning. After three seasons with the Giants, he was traded on December 11, 1941 along with Bill Lohrman and Johnny McCarthy to the St. Louis Cardinals for Johnny Mize. The Cardinals also had an All-Star catcher in Walker Cooper, so O'Dea once again found himself in a backup role.

When Cooper was inducted into the United States Navy in 1945, O'Dea was finally given the opportunity to be a starting catcher. He made the most of the opportunity, posting career-highs in hits (78), runs (36), runs batted in (43), extra-base hits (24), and games played (100). O'Dea's pitch calling skills helped the Cardinals pitching staff lead the league in shutouts as the team finished the season in second place, three games behind the Chicago Cubs. He also led National League catchers in fielding percentage and in base runners caught stealing, and finished second to Phil Masi in assists. He might have been an All-Star for the first time, but the 1945 game was cancelled on April 24 due to strict war-time travel restrictions and no All-Stars were named that season. In place of the All-Star Game, seven interleague games were played. The Associated Press sportswriters named O'Dea as an All-Star, a reserve catcher for the Nation League team.

The 33-year-old O'Dea was traded to the Boston Braves during the 1946 season to make room for young catcher, Joe Garagiola. With the Braves he once more resumed the role of a backup catcher behind another All-Star catcher, Phil Masi. O'Dea played in his final MLB game on August 6, 1946.

== MLB statistics ==
In a twelve-year MLB career, O'Dea played in 832 games, accumulating 560 hits in 2,195 at bats for a .255 career batting average, along with 40 home runs, 323 runs batted in and an on-base percentage of .338. He ended his career with a .983 fielding percentage, which was 4 points higher than the league average during his playing career. O'Dea appeared in five World Series (1935, 1938, 1942, 1943, 1944), batting .462 (6-for-13) with one home run and six RBI in post-season play. He was also valuable as a left-handed pinch hitter, leading the National League with 42 pinch-hitting appearances in 1942. Over the span of five World Series appearances, he set a since-broken record of three pinch hits in series competitions.

== Personal life ==
O'Dea was married to Mary June Davis O'Dea for 47 years until her death in 1982. They had five children, Carole, James Kenneth Jr., Stephen, Daniel and Debra, the last of whom was killed at the age of 8 in a tragic accident.

In his later life, O'Dea ran the White Horse Tavern in East Avon, New York, until it was destroyed by fire in 1955.

O'Dea died of lung cancer on December 17, 1985, at the age of 72 in his hometown of Lima.
