= Bill Endicott (baseball) =

American baseball player (1918–2016)

- Left fielder
- Born: September 4, 1918; Acorn, Missouri, U.S.
- Died: November 26, 2016 (aged 98); Sacramento, California, U.S.
- Batted: Left Threw: Left

MLB debut
- April 21, 1946, for the St. Louis Cardinals

Last MLB appearance
- September 18, 1946, for the St. Louis Cardinals

MLB statistics
- Batting average: .200
- At bats: 20
- Hits: 4
- Stats at Baseball Reference

Teams
- St. Louis Cardinals (1946)

William Franklin Endicott (September 4, 1918 – November 26, 2016) was an American professional baseball left fielder who played briefly for the St. Louis Cardinals during the 1946 season. A native of Acorn, Missouri, he batted and threw left-handed, stood 5 feet 11 inches (1.80 m) tall and weighed 175 pounds (79 kg). His professional baseball career spanned 1937 through 1947, with four seasons (1942–1945) missed during United States Army service in World War II.

With the 1946 Cardinals, Endicott posted a .200 batting average (4-for-20) with two runs and three RBI in 20 major league games; his four hits included three doubles, and a .333 on-base percentage without home runs. He did not appear in the 1946 World Series, won by the Cardinals in seven games over the Boston Red Sox.

He died on November 26, 2016, at the age of 98.

== See also ==
- 1946 St. Louis Cardinals season
