= Jim Gladd =

American baseball player (1922-1977)

- Catcher
- Born: October 2, 1922; Fort Gibson, Oklahoma
- Died: November 8, 1977 (aged 55); Long Beach, California
- Batted: Right Threw: Right

MLB debut
- September 9, 1946, for the New York Giants

Last MLB appearance
- September 29, 1946, for the New York Giants

MLB statistics
- Games played: 4
- Hits: 1
- Batting average: .091
- Stats at Baseball Reference

Teams
- New York Giants (1946)

James Walter Gladd (October 2, 1922 – November 8, 1977) was an American professional baseball catcher who played in four games in the major leagues for the New York Giants in 1946. Born in Fort Gibson, Oklahoma, he threw and batted right-handed, stood 6 feet 2 inches (1.88 m) tall and weighed 190 pounds (86 kg).

Gladd entered minor league baseball in 1940. After three seasons, he joined the United States Army for World War II military service. Commissioned a second lieutenant in June 1943, he was assigned to the 33rd Field Artillery Battalion of the First Infantry Division—the "Big Red One"—which saw combat in the North African Campaign, the Invasion of Sicily, and the European Theatre.

Gladd returned to baseball in 1946, and after 50 games with the Triple-A Jersey City Giants, he was recalled to New York for a September MLB audition. Starting four games between September 9 and 29, he collected his only hit, a single off Dick Koecher of the Philadelphia Phillies, in his fourth and final contest.

Although he never again reached the majors, Gladd continued his active career at the highest levels of the minors, playing eight seasons in the Pacific Coast League. He retired from the game in 1955 and died at age 55 in Long Beach, California, on November 8, 1977.
