= Jim Hopper (baseball) =

American baseball player (1919–1982)

- Pitcher
- Born: September 1, 1919; Charlotte, North Carolina
- Died: January 23, 1982 (aged 62); Charlotte, North Carolina
- Batted: Right Threw: Right

MLB debut
- April 21, 1946, for the Pittsburgh Pirates

Last MLB appearance
- May 17, 1946, for the Pittsburgh Pirates

MLB statistics
- Win–loss record: 0–1
- Earned run average: 10.38
- Strikeouts: 1
- Stats at Baseball Reference

Teams
- Pittsburgh Pirates (1946)

James McDaniel Hopper (September 1, 1919 – January 23, 1982) was a professional baseball player. He was a right-handed pitcher for one season (1946) with the Pittsburgh Pirates. For his career, he compiled an 0–1 record, with a 10.38 earned run average, and one strikeout in 4⅓ innings pitched.

He was born and later died in Charlotte, North Carolina at the age of 62.
