= Tommy Neill =

American baseball player

- Outfielder
- Born: November 7, 1919; Hartselle, Alabama, U.S.
- Died: September 22, 1980 (aged 60); Houston, Texas, U.S.
- Batted: Left Threw: Right

MLB debut
- September 10, 1946, for the Boston Braves

Last MLB appearance
- May 12, 1947, for the Boston Braves

MLB statistics
- Batting average: .255
- Home runs: 0
- Runs batted in: 7
- Stats at Baseball Reference

Teams
- Boston Braves (1946–1947)

Thomas White Neill (November 7, 1919 – September 22, 1980) was an American professional baseball player and outfielder who appeared in Major League Baseball in parts of two seasons (1946–1947) with the Boston Braves. For his MLB career, he compiled a .255 batting average in 55 at-bats, with 14 hits (including two doubles and one triple) and seven runs batted in. Born in Hartselle, Alabama, he batted left-handed, threw right-handed, and was listed as 6 feet 2 inches (1.88 m) tall and 200 pounds (91 kg).

As a member of the 1946 Birmingham Barons, Neill led the Double-A Southern Association in hits (207), batting average (.374) and runs batted in (124). In 1949 with the Nashville Volunteers of the same circuit, Neill came in second in the batting race, finishing with an average of .3460 — just .0004 behind Pat Haggerty, who later became known as a longtime National Football League referee.

Neill spent 15 years in professional baseball (1938–1943, 1946–1954). He died in Houston, Texas, at the age of 60.
