= Dee Phillips =

American baseball player (1919–2004)

- Infielder
- Born: June 8, 1919; Corsicana, Texas, U.S.
- Died: November 4, 2004 (aged 85); Fort Worth, Texas, U.S.
- Batted: Right Threw: Right

MLB debut
- July 19, 1942, for the Cincinnati Reds

Last MLB appearance
- September 22, 1946, for the Boston Braves

MLB statistics
- Batting average: .250
- Home runs: 1
- Runs batted in: 59
- Stats at Baseball Reference

Teams
- Cincinnati Reds (1942); Boston Braves (1944, 1946)

Damon Roswell "Dee" Phillips (June 8, 1919 – November 4, 2004) was an American professional baseball player, manager and scout. A shortstop and third baseman born in Corsicana, Texas, Phillips threw and batted right-handed, stood 6 feet (1.8 m) tall and weighed 176 pounds (80 kg). He played in Major League Baseball for the Cincinnati Reds (1942) and Boston Braves (1944; 1946).

Phillips' professional career began in 1938 when he was signed by the Detroit Tigers after a tryout with the Tigers' Texas League farm club, the Beaumont Exporters. However, he was declared a free agent by Commissioner of Baseball Kenesaw Mountain Landis after the 1939 season and was barred from re-signing with Detroit. He eventually joined the Reds' organization and was called to the majors in the middle of the 1942 season. He appeared in 28 games for Cincinnati and batted .202 in 84 at-bats.

On October 1, 1943, he was acquired by the Boston Braves and spent the entire 1944 campaign in Boston, playing in 140 games and hitting .258 in 489 at-bats. He then served in the United States Army and lost the 1945 season, and most of 1946, to military service. The Braves played Phillips in two games in September 1946, but the remainder of his playing career would be spent in minor league baseball and winter baseball. He played for ten years at the Triple-A level with the Milwaukee Brewers, Montreal Royals, Baltimore Orioles and Richmond Virginians.

Phillips managed in the farm systems of the New York Yankees and the MLB Baltimore Orioles, then scouted for Baltimore and the Tigers in his native Texas. Among those he signed for the Orioles was future MLB second baseman and manager Davey Johnson. Dee Phillips died at age 85 in Fort Worth, Texas.
