= John Carden (baseball) =

American baseball player (1921-1949)

- Pitcher
- Born: May 19, 1921; Killeen, Texas
- Died: February 8, 1949 (aged 27); Mexia, Texas
- Batted: Right Threw: Right

MLB debut
- May 18, 1946, for the New York Giants

Last MLB appearance
- May 18, 1946, for the New York Giants

MLB statistics
- Games pitched: 1
- Earned run average: 22.50
- Innings pitched: 2.0
- Stats at Baseball Reference

Teams
- New York Giants (1946)

John Bruton Carden (May 19, 1921 – February 8, 1949) was a Major League Baseball pitcher who played in one game for the New York Giants on May 18, 1946. He pitched in two innings, and allowed five earned runs. Carden died at age 27 after accidentally electrocuting himself.

== Relations ==
John was the great uncle of future baseball player Judah Carden, whose dad is jonathan carden
