= Lee Howard (baseball) =

American baseball player (1923–2018)

- Pitcher
- Born: November 11, 1923; Staten Island, New York, U.S.
- Died: April 24, 2018 (aged 94); Escondido, California, U.S.
- Batted: Left Threw: Left

MLB debut
- September 22, 1946, for the Pittsburgh Pirates

Last MLB appearance
- September 25, 1947, for the Pittsburgh Pirates

MLB statistics
- Win–loss record: 0–1
- Earned run average: 2.25
- Strikeouts: 8
- Stats at Baseball Reference

Teams
- Pittsburgh Pirates (1946–1947)

Lee Vincent Howard (November 11, 1923 – April 24, 2018) was an American professional baseball player. Howard played as a pitcher in Major League Baseball and made five appearances, including two starts, for the Pittsburgh Pirates in 1946 and 1947. He died on April 24, 2018, at the age of 94.
