= Bob Brady (baseball) =

American baseball player (1922-1996)

- Catcher
- Born: November 8, 1922; Lewistown, Pennsylvania, U.S.
- Died: April 22, 1996 (aged 73); Manchester, Connecticut, U.S.
- Batted: Left Threw: Right

MLB debut
- August 24, 1946, for the Boston Braves

Last MLB appearance
- April 17, 1947, for the Boston Braves

MLB statistics
- Batting average: .167
- Home runs: 0
- Runs batted in: 0
- Stats at Baseball Reference

Teams
- Boston Braves (1946–1947)

Robert Jay Brady (November 8, 1922 – April 22, 1996) was an American professional baseball player who was a catcher in Major League Baseball. He appeared in four total games played over two seasons with the 1946–47 Boston Braves, and spent 13 seasons (1940–52) in minor league baseball. Born in Lewistown, Pennsylvania, Brady threw right-handed, batted left-handed, stood 6 feet 1 inch (1.85 m) tall and weighed 175 pounds (79 kg).

Brady made seven plate appearances in the big leagues, and collected one hit and one base on balls. His hit—a pinch single—came on September 8, 1946, against Tommy Hughes of the Philadelphia Phillies at Braves Field in the second game of a doubleheader. Hughes pitched a 4–0 shutout victory against Boston.

One thing many people did not know was that at a young age Brady suffered from a bout of Scarlet Fever robbing him of his hearing in his left ear and minimal hearing in his right. Bob played just one year of high school baseball, his junior season. This was due to the fact that the high school had not sponsored a baseball program since 1936 and Bob left high school in the spring of his senior year to play minor league ball for Williamsport. Brady, along with his team, had an outstanding 1940 campaign as the Panthers went 9 – 1 under coach Jay M. Riden. A 2 – 0 loss to Juniata Joint was the only blemish of the season. In 10 games, Bob had 17 hits in 38 at – bats for a .447 average. He drove – in 10 runs and scored nine. The left – handed hitter also stroked four doubles and had three triples. He played mostly first base but also saw time in the outfield and caught in one game. On August 24, 1946 Bob played in his first major league game for the Boston Braves, now known as the Atlanta Braves. Brady appeared in two more games that season, going 1 – for – 5 at the plate. He also drew a walk. In 1947 Brady appeared in just one game, that coming on April 17, going hitless in just one at – bat. That game was to be Bob’s final one on the major league level.

During his professional career Brady was pretty much a catcher, spending 12 seasons in the minors mostly on the AAA level. In 1944, his second with the Hartford Chiefs of the old Eastern League, his team won the league championship and he was the league’s all – star catcher. He also saw time with Minneapolis of the American Association League where in one game he hit three home runs against Toledo. After his baseball career ended, Brady settled in Manchester, Connecticut and was employed by the State of Connecticut, in their purchasing department, retiring in 1983.

Brady suffered a stroke in 1996 and passed in a matter of months.

Brady lived most of his life in Manchester, Connecticut, married to Virginia K. Brady. He loved fishing and playing golf. He had one child, a daughter, named Patricia.
