= Al Tate =

American baseball player (1918–1993)

- Pitcher
- Born: July 1, 1918; Coleman, Oklahoma, U.S.
- Died: May 8, 1993 (aged 74); Bountiful, Utah, U.S.
- Batted: Right Threw: Right

MLB debut
- September 27, 1946, for the Pittsburgh Pirates

Last MLB appearance
- September 29, 1946, for the Pittsburgh Pirates

MLB statistics
- Win–loss record: 0–1
- Earned run average: 5.00
- Strikeouts: 2
- Stats at Baseball Reference

Teams
- Pittsburgh Pirates (1946)

Walter Alvin Tate (July 1, 1918 – May 8, 1993) was an American Major League Baseball pitcher who played in 1946 with the Pittsburgh Pirates. He batted and threw right-handed. Tate had a 0–1 record, with a 5.00 ERA, in two games, in his one-year career.

He was born in Coleman, Oklahoma, and died in Bountiful, Utah.
