= Dick Lajeskie =

American baseball player (1926-1976)

- Second baseman
- Born: January 8, 1926; Passaic, New Jersey
- Died: August 15, 1976 (aged 50); Ramsey, New Jersey
- Batted: Right Threw: Right

MLB debut
- September 10, 1946, for the New York Giants

Last MLB appearance
- September 22, 1946, for the New York Giants

MLB statistics
- Games played: 6
- At bats: 10
- Hits: 2
- Stats at Baseball Reference

Teams
- New York Giants (1946)

Richard Edward Lajeskie (January 8, 1926 – August 15, 1976) was an American professional baseball infielder who appeared in six Major League Baseball games as a second baseman and pinch runner for the 1946 New York Giants. Born in Passaic, New Jersey, he threw and batted right-handed, stood 5 feet 11 inches (1.80 m) tall and weighed 175 pounds (79 kg).

Lajeskie's eight-year pro career began in 1943 in the Giants' system at age 17 during World War II. He spent the full minor-league season of 1946 with Triple-A Jersey City and was called to the MLB Giants that September. In six contests—four as starting second baseman and two as a pinch runner—he collected two singles, three bases on balls and one hit by pitch in 14 plate appearances. He scored three career runs but did not earn an RBI.

He returned to the minors in 1947, playing into 1951. Lajeskie died at age 50 in Ramsey, New Jersey on August 15, 1976.
