= Bob Ramazzotti =

American baseball player (1917–2000)

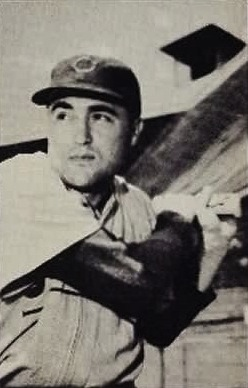
- Infielder
- Born: January 16, 1917; Eleanora, Pennsylvania, U.S.
- Died: February 15, 2000 (aged 83); Altoona, Pennsylvania, U.S.
- Batted: Right Threw: Right

MLB debut
- April 20, 1946, for the Brooklyn Dodgers

Last MLB appearance
- September 17, 1953, for the Chicago Cubs

MLB statistics
- Batting average: .230
- Home runs: 4
- Runs batted in: 53
- Stats at Baseball Reference

Teams
- Brooklyn Dodgers (1946, 1948–1949); Chicago Cubs (1949–1953)

Robert Louis Ramazzotti (January 16, 1917 – February 15, 2000) was an American professional baseball player who appeared in 346 Major League Baseball games between 1946 and 1953 as an infielder and pinch hitter for the Brooklyn Dodgers and Chicago Cubs. He was born in Eleanora, Pennsylvania, and grew up in Altoona.

Ramazzotti threw and batted right-handed and was listed as 5 feet 8 inches (1.73 m) tall and 175 pounds (79 kg). He was 23 years old when he entered Organized Baseball in the Brooklyn organization in 1940; then, after two minor league seasons and the outbreak of World War II, he joined the United States Army. Attaining the rank of staff sergeant, he was stationed in Europe as a member of the 71st Infantry Division. Ramazzotti missed four full baseball seasons, 1942 through 1945, due to his wartime service.

In 1946, he returned to baseball and spent the entire campaign on the Dodgers' MLB roster, playing in 62 games as a utility infielder for a Brooklyn team that finished in a dead heat for the National League pennant before falling to the eventual World Series champion St. Louis Cardinals in a tie-breaker series. Ramazzotti batted .208 in 133 plate appearances in his rookie season.

He spent all of 1947 and most of 1948 in Triple-A, where he sustained two serious injuries: a fractured skull from a beanball in 1947 and a badly sprained hand in the latter year. After appearing in a total of nine games for the Dodgers in 1948 and 1949, he was traded to the Chicago Cubs for fellow infielder Hank Schenz on May 16, 1949.

As a Cub, Ramazzotti experienced his most sustained success in professional baseball, appearing in 275 games over 41/2 National League seasons, and batting .262, .247 and .284 in the three campaigns spanning 1950 to 1952. He had two four-hit games, both in 1949, a year in which, ironically, he struggled badly at the plate, batting only .179 with 34 total hits in a Chicago uniform.

During his MLB career of all or part of seven seasons and 346 games, Bob Ramazzotti collected 196 safeties, with 22 doubles, nine triples, four home runs and 53 runs batted in; he batted .230 lifetime. Defensively, he started 99 games as a second baseman, 58 as a third baseman and 43 at shortstop.

After baseball, Ramazzotti returned to Altoona, where he worked in manufacturing and later operated a sandwich shop. He died there at age 83 in February 2000.
