= Stew Hofferth =

American baseball player

- Catcher
- Born: January 27, 1913; Logansport, Indiana, U.S.
- Died: March 7, 1994 (aged 81); Valparaiso, Indiana, U.S.
- Batted: Right Threw: Right

MLB debut
- April 19, 1944, for the Boston Braves

Last MLB appearance
- June 15, 1946, for the Boston Braves

MLB statistics
- Batting average: .216
- Home runs: 4
- Runs: 30
- Stats at Baseball Reference

Teams
- Boston Braves (1944–1946)

Stewart Edward Hofferth (January 27, 1913 – March 7, 1994) was an American professional baseball player. The catcher appeared in 136 Major League Baseball games played over three seasons for the 1944–46 Boston Braves. Listed at 6 feet 2 inches (1.88 metres) tall and 195 pounds (88 kilograms), Hofferth threw and batted right-handed. He was born in Logansport, Indiana.

Hofferth spent eight years (1936–43) in minor league baseball, including three seasons (1940–42) as a player-manager in the Brooklyn Dodgers' organization. In 1943, he was selected the Most Valuable Player of the top-level American Association after he batted.301 with 83 runs batted in as a member of the Indianapolis Indians. That banner year earned Hofferth a promotion to the Braves in 1944 during the World War II manpower shortage. He appeared in a career-high 66 games during his rookie season as the backup to Phil Masi and Clyde Kluttz. On May 13, 1944, Hofferth collected four hits and scored four runs in six at bats to help lead the Braves to a 16–2 rout of the Pittsburgh Pirates at Forbes Field. Two and a half months later, on July 30, he had another four-hit day against the Pirates, this time in four at bats, in a 6–4 Boston triumph at Braves Field.

Hofferth's playing time diminished in 1945, although he hit three home runs and started 43 games at catcher (both career bests) for the Braves that season. Hofferth then spent the first two months of the postwar 1946 campaign on the Braves' roster, appearing in 20 games and starting 15 behind the plate. On June 15, he went hitless in three at bats against Ed Heusser of the Cincinnati Reds at Braves Field. Later that day, then the trading deadline in Major League Baseball, he was reacquired by Brooklyn in a one-for-one deal for fellow Hoosier Billy Herman, the veteran 36-year-old second baseman in the twilight of a Hall of Fame career. Hofferth never played another MLB game and retired after spending 1948 as a player-manager in the Dodger organization.

In addition to four home runs, his 88 big-league hits included 11 doubles and one triple. Hofferth died at age 81 in Valparaiso, Indiana.
