= Joe Tepsic =

American baseball player (1923–2009)

- Outfielder
- Born: September 18, 1923; Slovan, Pennsylvania, U.S.
- Died: February 23, 2009 (aged 85); Bald Eagle, Pennsylvania, U.S.
- Batted: Right Threw: Right

MLB debut
- July 12, 1946, for the Brooklyn Dodgers

Last MLB appearance
- October 1, 1946, for the Brooklyn Dodgers

MLB statistics
- Batting average: .000
- Home runs: 0
- Runs batted in: 0
- Stats at Baseball Reference

Teams
- Brooklyn Dodgers (1946)

Joseph John Tepsic (September 18, 1923 – February 23, 2009) was an American Major League Baseball outfielder. He played only one season for the Brooklyn Dodgers in 1946. He was 5'9", 170 pounds, and he threw and batted right-handed.

During World War II, Tepsic served in the United States Marines Corps and was wounded on Guadalcanal. He eventually recovered and went on to attend Penn State University, where he was an outstanding athlete in both football and baseball. After receiving a contract offer from the Brooklyn Dodgers, he left Penn State. He was also drafted by the Pittsburgh Steelers in the fourth round of the 1946 NFL draft (28th overall) but declined to play.

On July 12, 1946, at the age of 22 and wearing the number 32, Tepsic made his major league debut. He played in 15 games that year, collecting zero hits in five at-bats. Tepsic was used primarily as a pinch runner, appearing in only one game on the field. His performance on the field was overshadowed by disagreements with his teammates, who wanted him to go down to the minor leagues so the team could call up a veteran to pinch hit. However, Tepsic refused, citing a clause in his contract. The Dodgers finished in second place, two games behind the St. Louis Cardinals. Tepsic played his final major league game on October 1, 1946.

In 1947, Tepsic was sent down to the minor leagues. Furious over the assignment and thinking he warranted a chance to prove himself at a major league level, Tepsic quit the Dodgers on April 3. He spent another five seasons in the minors before retiring from professional baseball.

Later in life, Tepsic worked in the logging industry and also as a state highway inspector.

Tepsic died on February 23, 2009, at the age of 85.

== In media ==
Tepsic's brief yet tumultuous major league career, demotion to the minor leagues, and subsequent exit from organized baseball was recounted in the song 'The Fury of Joe Tepsic' by Canadian experimental rock group Glutenhead.
