= John Corriden =

American baseball player (1918–2001)

- Pinch runner
- Born: January 6, 1918; Logansport, Indiana, U.S.
- Died: June 4, 2001 (aged 83); Indianapolis, Indiana, U.S.
- Batted: Switch Threw: Right

MLB debut
- April 20, 1946, for the Brooklyn Dodgers

Last MLB appearance
- April 20, 1946, for the Brooklyn Dodgers

MLB statistics
- Batting average: .000
- Home Run: 0
- Runs scored: 1
- Stats at Baseball Reference

Teams
- Brooklyn Dodgers (1946)

John Michael Corriden Jr. (January 6, 1918 – June 4, 2001) was an American Major League Baseball player. He made one appearance in a baseball game with the Brooklyn Dodgers as a pinch runner on April 20, 1946. He was an outfielder during his minor league career.

He was the son of former Dodger, Chicago Cubs, New York Yankees and Chicago White Sox coach Red Corriden.

== See also ==
- List of second-generation Major League Baseball players
