= Junior Walsh =

American baseball player (1919–1990)

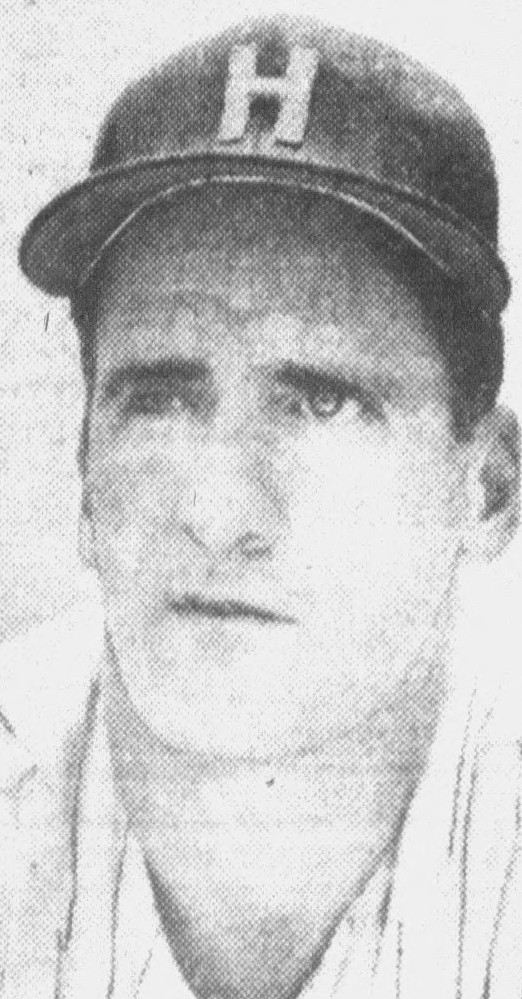
- Walsh, circa 1954
- Pitcher
- Born: March 7, 1919; Newark, New Jersey, US
- Died: November 12, 1990 (aged 71); Olyphant, Pennsylvania, US
- Batted: Right Threw: Right

MLB debut
- September 14, 1946, for the Pittsburgh Pirates

Last MLB appearance
- September 9, 1951, for the Pittsburgh Pirates

MLB statistics
- Win–loss record: 4–10
- Earned run average: 5.88
- Strikeouts: 91
- Stats at Baseball Reference

Teams
- Pittsburgh Pirates (1946, 1948–1951)

James Gerald "Junior" Walsh (March 7, 1919 – November 12, 1990) was an American professional baseball pitcher who appeared in all or part of five seasons in Major League Baseball for the Pittsburgh Pirates (1946, 1948–1951). Born in Newark, New Jersey, he threw and batted right-handed, stood 5 feet 11 inches (1.80 m) tall and weighed 185 pounds (84 kg).

Walsh's professional career began in 1941 and was interrupted by two years of United States Army service during World War II. He worked in only 15 total games during his first three trials with the Pirates before sticking with Pittsburgh for the full 1950 and 1951 seasons. For much of Walsh's tenure, the Pirates wallowed at the bottom of the National League standings, and in his 89 total MLB games, he posted a 4–10 won–lost record and 5.88 earned run average, allowing 201 hits and 111 bases on balls in 193 innings pitched, with 91 strikeouts. In 12 starting assignments, Walsh notched one complete game, which was also his only shutout; it came on August 18, 1949, a three-hitter against the Chicago Cubs at Forbes Field. The 2–0 victory was Walsh's second MLB triumph and the only win he recorded in eight big-league games in 1949. During his time as a relief pitcher, he earned two saves.

Walsh experienced some success during his minor league career, winning 16 games at the highest level as a member of the 1953 Hollywood Stars of the Pacific Coast League. He left baseball in 1956, his 14th professional season. Walsh died in 1990 in Olyphant, Pennsylvania, at the age of 71.
