= Carden Gillenwater =

American baseball player (1917–2000)

- Center fielder
- Born: May 13, 1917; Riceville, Tennessee, U.S.
- Died: May 10, 2000 (aged 82); Largo, Florida, U.S.
- Batted: Right Threw: Right

MLB debut
- September 22, 1940, for the St. Louis Cardinals

Last MLB appearance
- September 18, 1948, for the Washington Senators

MLB statistics
- Batting average: .260
- Home runs: 11
- Runs scored: 129
- Stats at Baseball Reference

Teams
- St. Louis Cardinals (1940); Brooklyn Dodgers (1943); Boston Braves (1945–1946); Washington Senators (1948)

Carden Edison Gillenwater (May 13, 1917 – May 10, 2000) was an American Major League Baseball center fielder. A native of Riceville, Tennessee, he played for the St. Louis Cardinals (1940), Brooklyn Dodgers (1943), Boston Braves (1945–1946) and Washington Senators (1948).

Gillenwater threw and batted right-handed, stood 6 feet 1 inch (1.85 m) tall and weighed 175 pounds (79 kg). After beginning his 18-year professional baseball career in 1937, he made his major league debut on September 22, 1940 with the St. Louis Cardinals. He played seven games that season, hitting .160 for the Cardinals. After two years in the minor leagues, he played in eight games for the Brooklyn Dodgers in 1943.

Gillenwater's best season was 1945, when he was a regular center fielder for the Braves, appearing in 144 games. He hit .288 (149-for-517) with 7 home runs, 72 runs batted in, and 74 runs scored, and led National League outfielders with 451 putouts and 24 assists. He also ranked in the league's top ten for bases on balls, on-base percentage, and stolen bases. Gillenwater tied a major league outfield record with 12 putouts in a game in 1946.

He was a part-time player in 1946 and 1948, appearing in a total of 176 games and batting .236. On September 27, 1948 he was traded by the Washington Senators to the Cincinnati Reds for outfielder Clyde Vollmer, and never again played in a major league game.

In a total of 335 MLB games, he was 261-for-1004 (.260), and 153 walks and three hit by pitches pushed his on-base percentage up to .359. He had 11 HR, 114 RBI, scored 129 runs, and had a slugging percentage of .348. In the outfield he handled 869 out of 888 chances successfully for a .979 fielding percentage.

Gillenwater died at the age of 82 in Largo, Florida, only three days before his 83rd birthday.
