= Ed Albosta =

American baseball player (1918–2003)

- Pitcher
- Born: October 27, 1918; Saginaw, Michigan, U.S.
- Died: January 7, 2003 (aged 84); Saginaw, Michigan, U.S.
- Batted: Right Threw: Right

MLB debut
- September 3, 1941, for the Brooklyn Dodgers

Last MLB appearance
- September 24, 1946, for the Pittsburgh Pirates

MLB statistics
- Win–loss record: 0–8
- Earned run average: 6.15
- Strikeouts: 43
- Stats at Baseball Reference

Teams
- Brooklyn Dodgers (1941); Pittsburgh Pirates (1946)

Edward John Albosta (October 27, 1918 – January 7, 2003), nicknamed "Rube", was an American pitcher in Major League Baseball. He pitched for the Brooklyn Dodgers in 1941 and the Pittsburgh Pirates in 1946. In between he served three years in the U.S. Army during World War II. He played semi-pro ball after that, retiring in 1954. His best record was in 1951 when he went 19–11 for Saginaw.

Albosta died January 7, 2003.
