= Jack Graham (baseball) =

American baseball player (1916-1998)

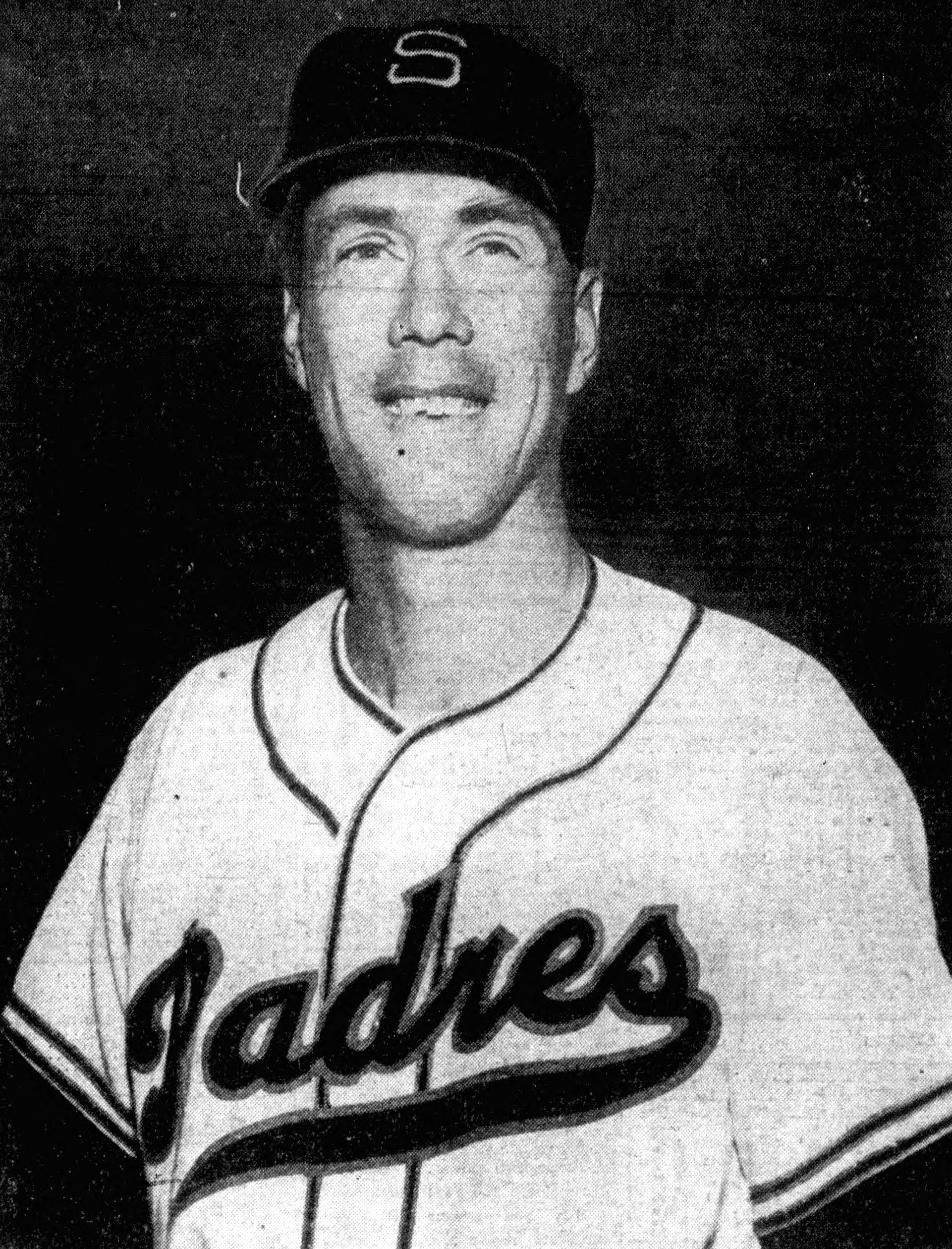
- Graham, circa 1950
- First baseman
- Born: December 24, 1916; Minneapolis, Minnesota, U.S.
- Died: December 30, 1998 (aged 82); Los Alamitos, California, U.S.
- Batted: Left Threw: Left

MLB debut
- April 16, 1946, for the Brooklyn Dodgers

Last MLB appearance
- September 25, 1949, for the St. Louis Browns

MLB statistics
- Batting average: .231
- Home runs: 38
- Runs batted in: 126
- Stats at Baseball Reference

Teams
- Brooklyn Dodgers (1946); New York Giants (1946); St. Louis Browns (1949)

John Bernard Graham (December 24, 1916 – December 30, 1998) was an American professional baseball first baseman. He played in Major League Baseball for the Brooklyn Dodgers, New York Giants, and St. Louis Browns between 1946 and 1949.

He died at age 82 in Los Alamitos, California.

His father, Peaches Graham, also played in the majors.

== See also ==
- List of second-generation Major League Baseball players
