= Dick Mulligan =

American baseball player (1918–1992)

- Pitcher
- Born: March 18, 1918; Swoyersville, Pennsylvania, U.S.
- Died: December 15, 1992 (aged 74); Victoria, Texas, U.S.
- Batted: Left Threw: Left

MLB debut
- September 24, 1941, for the Washington Senators

Last MLB appearance
- May 4, 1947, for the Boston Braves

MLB statistics
- Win–loss record: 3–3
- Earned run average: 4.44
- Strikeouts: 23
- Stats at Baseball Reference

Teams
- Washington Senators (1941); Philadelphia Phillies (1946); Boston Braves (1946–1947)

Richard Charles Mulligan (March 18, 1918 – December 15, 1992) was an American Major League Baseball left-handed pitcher, chiefly in relief. He played parts of four seasons with the Washington Senators (1941), Philadelphia Phillies (1946), and Boston Braves (1946 – 1947).

Mulligan served with the US Army Air Force from 1942 to 1946 during World War II.
