= Johnny Hutchings =

American baseball player (1916–1963)

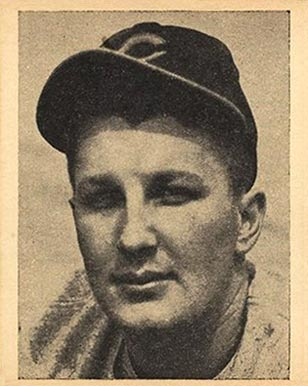
- Pitcher
- Born: April 14, 1916; Chicago, Illinois, U.S.
- Died: April 27, 1963 (aged 47); Indianapolis, Indiana, U.S.
- Batted: Both Threw: Right

MLB debut
- April 26, 1940, for the Cincinnati Reds

Last MLB appearance
- April 21, 1946, for the Boston Braves

MLB statistics
- Win–loss record: 12–18
- Earned run average: 3.96
- Strikeouts: 212
- Stats at Baseball Reference

Teams
- Cincinnati Reds (1940–1941); Boston Braves (1941–1942, 1944–1946)

Career highlights and awards
- World Series champion (1940)

John Richard Joseph Hutchings (April 14, 1916 – April 27, 1963) was an American professional baseball player, a right-handed pitcher who worked in 155 Major League games, mostly as a relief pitcher, for the Cincinnati Reds and Boston Braves during the 1940s. The native of Chicago stood 6 feet 2 inches (1.88 m) tall and weighed 250 pounds (110 kg).

== Baseball career ==
=== Cincinnati Reds ===
Hutchings' professional career began in 1935 and he reached the Majors after winning 22 games in 1939 for the Pensacola Pilots in the Class B Southeastern League. As a 1940 rookie playing for the defending National League champion Cincinnati Reds, he appeared in 19 games, including four starting assignments, for a team that ultimately won the 1940 world championship.

Hutchings started one of the most tragic games in Cincinnati club history, the second game of a doubleheader on August 3, 1940, in Boston, against the "Bees" (the Braves' official name from 1936 to 1940). Hutchings lasted only 1 2/3 innings of the nightcap, and Boston won, 5–2, for a split of the twin bill. But the result of the game proved insignificant in light of the off-field misfortune that beset the Cincinnati team. Willard Hershberger, temporarily the Reds' starting catcher due to injury, had not reported to the ballpark for the day's doubleheader and stayed behind in his hotel room. During that second game, the Reds learned that Hershberger, despondent over what he perceived as his poor play, had committed suicide earlier that afternoon.

Hutchings worked in six more games during the regular season, and was on the Reds' roster for the 1940 World Series against the Detroit Tigers. He appeared in the eighth inning of Game 5, an 8–0 Detroit victory, and allowed two hits, a wild pitch, and one earned run. But the Reds went on to win the Series in seven games for their second Major League Baseball championship.

=== Boston Braves ===
On June 12, 1941, the Reds traded Hutchings to the Braves for veteran outfielder and future Baseball Hall of Fame member Lloyd Waner. Hutchings lost six of his seven decisions for the second-division Braves in 1941 and then was sent to the minor-league Indianapolis Indians of the American Association during 1942. Hutchings would become a stalwart member of the Indianapolis team, pitching for the Indians for eight seasons between 1942 and 1951, and compiling a win–loss mark of 59–37.

He also returned to the Majors with the Braves during 1944, near the height of the World War II manpower shortage. In his best MLB season, 1945 for Boston, he appeared in a team-high 57 games, 45 in relief and 12 as a starter. He won seven games and lost six, with three saves, three complete games and two shutouts. He also led the National League in home runs allowed with 21, including Hall of Famer Mel Ott's 500th blast on August 2.

During his Major League career, he allowed 474 hits and 180 bases on balls in 471 innings pitched; he struck out 212. After his active career ended, he managed in the Chicago White Sox' farm system and coached for and briefly managed (in 1960) the Indianapolis Indians. He died in Indianapolis of uremia at the age of 47.
