= Don Padgett =

American baseball player (1911–1980)

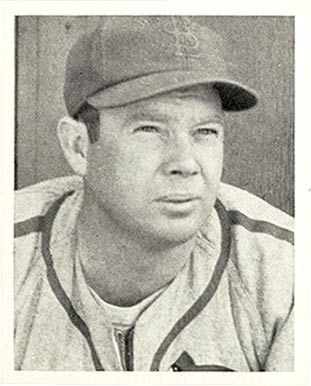
- Catcher
- Born: December 5, 1911; Caroleen, North Carolina, U.S.
- Died: December 9, 1980 (aged 69); High Point, North Carolina, U.S.
- Batted: Left Threw: Right

MLB debut
- April 23, 1937, for the St. Louis Cardinals

Last MLB appearance
- September 12, 1948, for the Philadelphia Phillies

MLB statistics
- Batting average: .288
- Home runs: 37
- Runs batted in: 338
- Stats at Baseball Reference

Teams
- St. Louis Cardinals (1937–1941); Brooklyn Dodgers (1946); Boston Braves (1946); Philadelphia Phillies (1947–1948)

Don Wilson Padgett (December 5, 1911 – December 9, 1980) was an American professional baseball player, a catcher/outfielder for the St. Louis Cardinals (1937–41), Brooklyn Dodgers (1946), Boston Braves (1946) and Philadelphia Phillies (1947–48). Padgett, born in Caroleen, North Carolina, batted left-handed, threw right-handed, stood 6 feet (1.8 m) tall and weighed 190 pounds (86 kg). He attended Lenoir-Rhyne College.

Padgett's professional career stretched from 1935 through 1951. From 1942 to 1945 Padgett served in the United States Navy during World War II.

In 1939, Padgett — while serving as backup catcher to Cardinals receiver Mickey Owen — batted a lofty .399 in 92 games played, 257 plate appearances and 233 at bats, but did not qualify for the National League batting championship. All told, in eight Major League seasons he played in 699 games and had 1,991 At Bats, 247 Runs, 573 Hits, 111 Doubles, 16 Triples, 37 Home Runs, 338 RBI, 6 Stolen Bases, 141 Walks, .288 Batting Average, .336 On-base percentage, .415 Slugging Percentage, 827 Total Bases and 10 Sacrifice Hits.

Padgett died in High Point, North Carolina, four days after his 69th birthday.

== Sources ==
- Career statistics from Baseball Reference · Baseball Reference (Minors) · Retrosheet · Baseball Almanac
