= Johnny McCarthy (baseball) =

American baseball player (1910–1973)

- First baseman
- Born: January 7, 1910; Chicago, Illinois, U.S.
- Died: September 13, 1973 (aged 63); Mundelein, Illinois, U.S.
- Batted: Left Threw: Left

MLB debut
- September 2, 1934, for the Brooklyn Dodgers

Last MLB appearance
- September 26, 1948, for the New York Giants

MLB statistics
- Batting average: .277
- Home runs: 25
- Runs batted in: 209
- Stats at Baseball Reference

Teams
- Brooklyn Dodgers (1934–1935); New York Giants (1936–1941); Boston Braves (1943, 1946); New York Giants (1948)

John Joseph McCarthy (January 7, 1910 – September 13, 1973) was an American professional baseball first baseman. He played in Major League Baseball (MLB) for all or parts of 11 seasons for the Brooklyn Dodgers, New York Giants and Boston Braves between 1934 and 1948. Born in Chicago, McCarthy threw and batted left-handed, stood 6 feet 1 inch (1.85 m) tall and weighed 185 pounds (84 kg).

He helped the Giants win the 1937 National League pennant as their regular first baseman. His 65 runs batted in were third on the team. In the 1937 World Series, McCarthy started all five games against the cross-town New York Yankees and collected four hits, including a double, in 19 at bats (.211). The Yankees won the Series, four games to one.

In his 11 MLB seasons, McCarthy played in 542 games and had 1,557 at-bats, 182 runs, 432 hits, 72 doubles, 16 triples, 25 home runs, 209 RBI, 8 stolen bases, 90 walks, .277 batting average, .319 on-base percentage, .392 slugging percentage, 611 total bases and 19 sacrifice hits. Defensively, he recorded a .990 fielding percentage as a first baseman.

He died in Mundelein, Illinois at the age of 63.
