= Johnny Barrett (baseball) =

American baseball player (1915–1974)

- Outfielder
- Born: December 18, 1915; Lowell, Massachusetts, U.S.
- Died: August 17, 1974 (aged 58); Seabrook Beach, New Hampshire, U.S.
- Batted: Left Threw: Left

MLB debut
- February 14, 1942, for the Pittsburgh Pirates

Last MLB appearance
- September 26, 1946, for the Boston Braves

MLB statistics
- Batting average: .251
- Home runs: 23
- Runs batted in: 220
- Stats at Baseball Reference

Teams
- Pittsburgh Pirates (1942–1946); Boston Braves (1946)

Career highlights and awards
- NL stolen base leader (1944)

John Joseph Barrett (December 18, 1915 – August 17, 1974) was an American outfielder in Major League Baseball from 1942 to 1946. He played for the Pittsburgh Pirates and Boston Braves.

Barrett was born in Lowell, Massachusetts. He started his professional baseball career in 1937, in the Boston Red Sox organization. In 1940 and 1941, he played in the Pacific Coast League. He hit .313 in 1941 and was purchased by the Pirates after the season ended.

Barrett made his major league debut in 1942. He immediately broke into the starting lineup and stayed there until 1946. Regarded as one of the fastest runners in baseball, Barrett led the National League in stolen bases and triples in 1944. In 1946, however, he suffered a knee injury. He was traded to the Braves, and in 1947 he went back to the Pacific Coast League. He retired from baseball in 1951.

== See also ==
- List of Major League Baseball annual stolen base leaders
- List of Major League Baseball annual triples leaders
