= Dick Koecher =

American baseball player (1926–2020)

- Pitcher
- Born: March 30, 1926; Philadelphia, Pennsylvania, U.S.
- Died: February 4, 2020 (aged 93); Naples, Florida, U.S.
- Batted: Left Threw: Left

MLB debut
- September 29, 1946, for the Philadelphia Phillies

Last MLB appearance
- October 2, 1948, for the Philadelphia Phillies

MLB statistics
- Win–loss record: 0–4
- Earned run average: 4.91
- Strikeouts: 8
- Stats at Baseball Reference

Teams
- Philadelphia Phillies (1946–1948)

Richard Finlay Koecher (March 30, 1926 – February 4, 2020), nicknamed "Highpockets", was an American professional baseball pitcher, who appeared in seven games over three seasons with the Philadelphia Phillies in the major leagues from 1946 to 1948. He died on February 4, 2020, at the age of 93.
