= Clyde Kluttz =

American baseball player (1917–1979)

- Catcher
- Born: December 12, 1917; Rockwell, North Carolina, U.S.
- Died: May 12, 1979 (aged 61); Salisbury, North Carolina, U.S.
- Batted: Right Threw: Right

MLB debut
- April 20, 1942, for the Boston Braves

Last MLB appearance
- September 27, 1952, for the Washington Senators

MLB statistics
- Batting average: .268
- Home runs: 19
- Runs batted in: 212
- Stats at Baseball Reference

Teams
- Boston Braves (1942–1945); New York Giants (1945–1946); St. Louis Cardinals (1946); Pittsburgh Pirates (1947–1948); St. Louis Browns (1951); Washington Senators (1951–1952)

Clyde Franklin Kluttz (December 12, 1917 – May 12, 1979) was an American professional baseball player, scout and front-office executive. In Major League Baseball, Kluttz was a catcher for the Boston Braves (1942–45), New York Giants (1945–46), St. Louis Cardinals (1946), Pittsburgh Pirates (1947–48), St. Louis Browns (1951) and Washington Senators (1951–52). He threw and batted right-handed, stood 6 feet (1.8 m) tall and weighed 193 pounds (88 kg).

Born in nearby Rockwell, he was a longtime resident of Salisbury, North Carolina, where he attended Catawba College. His 17-year playing career began in 1938. Kluttz appeared in 52 regular season games as a member of the 1946 world champion Cardinals—and was the starting catcher on October 3 for the flag-clinching Game 2 of the postseason playoff against the Brooklyn Dodgers—but he did not play in the 1946 World Series.

In nine Major League seasons, Kluttz played in 656 games, and had 1,903 at-bats, 172 runs, 510 hits, 90 doubles, 8 triples, 19 home runs, 212 RBI, 5 stolen bases, 132 walks, .268 batting average, .318 on-base percentage, .354 slugging percentage, 673 total bases and 30 sacrifice hits.

Kluttz was a longtime scout after his playing days ended. He was a manager in the Philadelphia Athletics system in 1954 and moved with the team to Kansas City, working with the Kansas City Athletics and New York Yankees. He was credited with signing Baseball Hall of Famer Catfish Hunter, a fellow North Carolinian, for the Athletics in 1964, and, 11 years later, while serving as the Yankees' scouting director (1974–75), he played a key role in convincing free agent Hunter to join the Yankees.

Kluttz resigned from the Yankees and was reunited with friend and Athletics colleague Hank Peters as director of player development with the Baltimore Orioles on 7 January 1976. He was instrumental in the Orioles acquiring Rick Dempsey, Scott McGregor and Tippy Martinez from the Yankees in a five-for-five trade deadline blockbuster five months later on 15 June. The three players became part of a nucleus that enabled the Orioles to continue as perennial contenders for the next decade. Kluttz served in that capacity from 1976 until his 1979 death, in Salisbury, at age 61 from kidney and heart ailments.

== Sources ==
- Career statistics from Baseball Reference · Retrosheet · Baseball Almanac
