= 1946 Cincinnati Reds season =

1946 Cincinnati Reds
- League: National League
- Ballpark: Crosley Field
- City: Cincinnati
- Owners: Powel Crosley Jr.
- General managers: Warren Giles
- Managers: Bill McKechnie, Hank Gowdy
- Radio: WCPO (Waite Hoyt)

The 1946 Cincinnati Reds season was a season in American baseball. The team finished sixth in the National League with a record of 67–87, 30 games behind the St. Louis Cardinals.

== Regular season ==
=== Season standings ===
National League
Team	W	L	Pct.	GB	Home	Road
St. Louis Cardinals	98	58	.628	—	49‍–‍29	49‍–‍29
Brooklyn Dodgers	96	60	.615	2	56‍–‍22	40‍–‍38
Chicago Cubs	82	71	.536	14½	44‍–‍33	38‍–‍38
Boston Braves	81	72	.529	15½	45‍–‍31	36‍–‍41
Philadelphia Phillies	69	85	.448	28	41‍–‍36	28‍–‍49
Cincinnati Reds	67	87	.435	30	35‍–‍42	32‍–‍45
Pittsburgh Pirates	63	91	.409	34	37‍–‍40	26‍–‍51
New York Giants	61	93	.396	36	38‍–‍39	23‍–‍54

=== Record vs. opponents ===
1946 National League record Sources:
Team	BSN	BRO	CHC	CIN	NYG	PHI	PIT	STL
Boston	—	5–17	12–9–1	15–7	13–9	14–8	15–7	7–15
Brooklyn	17–5	—	11–11	14–8–1	15–7	17–5	14–8	8–16
Chicago	9–12–1	11–11	—	13–9	17–5	12–10	12–10–1	8–14
Cincinnati	7–15	8–14–1	9–13	—	14–8	8–14–1	13–9	8–14
New York	9–13	7–15	5–17	8–14	—	12–10	10–12	10–12
Philadelphia	8–14	5–17	10–12	14–8–1	10–12	—	14–8	8–14
Pittsburgh	7–15	8–14	10–12–1	9–13	12–10	8–14	—	9–13
St. Louis	15–7	16–8	14–8	14–8	12–10	14–8	13–9	—

=== Roster ===
1946 Cincinnati Reds
Roster
Pitchers: 35 Nate Andrews; 43 Joe Beggs; 47 Ewell Blackwell; 42 George Burpo; 38 Frank Dasso; 37 Howie Fox; 41 Harry Gumbert; 40 Johnny Hetki; 34 Ed Heusser; 32 Clayton Lambert; 38,44 Bob Malloy; 36 Clyde Shoun; 33 Johnny Vander Meer; 31 Bucky Walters	Catchers: 4 Al Lakeman; 5 Ray Lamanno; 7 Ray Mueller; Infielders: 12 Bobby Adams; 14 Claude Corbitt; 11 Lonny Frey; 18 Bert Haas; 15 Grady Hatton; 13 Eddie Miller; 17 Eddie Shokes; 16 Benny Zientara	Outfielders: 20 Dain Clay; 28 Garland Lawing; 22 Al Libke; 27 Eddie Lukon; 23 Mike McCormick; 21 Howie Moss; 19 Bob Usher; 28,46 Clyde Vollmer; 24 Max West; Other batters: 21,23 Lonnie Goldstein	Manager: 1 Bill McKechnie; Coaches: 3 Hank Gowdy; 6 Gee Walker; 2 Jimmie Wilson

== Player stats ==
=== Batting ===
==== Starters by position ====
Note: Pos = Position; G = Games played; AB = At bats; H = Hits; Avg. = Batting average; HR = Home runs; RBI = Runs batted in

Pos	Player	G	AB	H	Avg.	HR	RBI
C	Ray Mueller	114	378	96	.254	8	48
1B	Bert Haas	140	535	141	.264	3	50
2B	Bobby Adams	94	311	76	.244	4	24
SS	Eddie Miller	91	299	58	.194	6	36
3B	Grady Hatton	116	436	118	.271	14	69
OF	Al Libke	124	431	109	.253	5	42
OF	Eddie Lukon	102	312	78	.250	12	34
OF	Dain Clay	121	435	99	.228	2	22

==== Other batters ====
Note: G = Games played; AB = At bats; H = Hits; Avg. = Batting average; HR = Home runs; RBI = Runs batted in

Player	G	AB	H	Avg.	HR	RBI
Lonny Frey	111	333	82	.246	3	24
Benny Zientara	78	280	81	.289	0	16
Claude Corbitt	82	274	68	.248	1	16
Ray Lamanno	85	239	58	.243	1	30
Max West	72	202	43	.213	5	18
Bob Usher	92	152	31	.204	1	14
Eddie Shokes	31	83	10	.120	0	5
Mike McCormick	23	74	16	.216	0	5
Al Lakeman	23	30	4	.133	0	4
Howie Moss	7	26	5	.192	0	1
Clyde Vollmer	9	22	4	.182	0	1
Lonnie Goldstein	6	5	0	.000	0	0
Garland Lawing	3	3	0	.000	0	0

=== Pitching ===
==== Starting pitchers ====
Note: G = Games pitched; IP = Innings pitched; W = Wins; L = Losses; ERA = Earned run average; SO = Strikeouts

Player	G	IP	W	L	ERA	SO
Johnny Vander Meer	29	204.1	10	12	3.17	94
Ewell Blackwell	33	194.1	9	13	2.45	100
Joe Beggs	28	190.0	12	10	2.32	38
Ed Heusser	29	167.2	7	14	3.22	47
Bucky Walters	22	151.1	10	7	2.56	60
Nate Andrews	7	43.1	2	4	3.95	13
Al Libke	1	5.0	0	0	3.60	2

==== Other pitchers ====
Note: G = Games pitched; IP = Innings pitched; W = Wins; L = Losses; ERA = Earned run average; SO = Strikeouts

Player	G	IP	W	L	ERA	SO
Johnny Hetki	32	126.1	6	6	2.99	41
Harry Gumbert	36	119.0	6	8	3.25	44
Clyde Shoun	27	79.0	1	6	4.10	20
Clayton Lambert	23	52.2	2	2	4.27	20

==== Relief pitchers ====
Note: G = Games pitched; W = Wins; L = Losses; SV = Saves; ERA = Earned run average; SO = Strikeouts

Player	G	W	L	SV	ERA	SO
Bob Malloy	27	2	5	2	2.75	24
Howie Fox	4	0	0	0	18.00	1
George Burpo	2	0	0	0	15.43	1
Frank Dasso	2	0	0	0	27.00	1

== Farm system ==
Level	Team	League	Manager
AAA	Syracuse Chiefs	International League	Jewel Ens
A	Columbia Reds	Sally League	Keith Molesworth
C	Ogden Reds	Pioneer League	Jim Keesey
D	Middletown Rockets	Ohio State League	Mike Blazo
