= 1945 Cincinnati Reds season =

1945 Cincinnati Reds
- League: National League
- Ballpark: Crosley Field
- City: Cincinnati
- Owners: Powel Crosley Jr.
- General managers: Warren Giles
- Managers: Bill McKechnie
- Radio: WCPO (Waite Hoyt, Lee Allen)

The 1945 Cincinnati Reds season was a season in American baseball. The team finished seventh in the National League with a record of 61–93, 37 games behind the Chicago Cubs.

== Offseason ==
- Prior to 1945 season: Eddie Erautt was obtained by the Reds from the Hollywood Stars as part of a minor league working agreement.

== Regular season ==
=== Season standings ===
National League
Team	W	L	Pct.	GB	Home	Road
Chicago Cubs	98	56	.636	—	49‍–‍26	49‍–‍30
St. Louis Cardinals	95	59	.617	3	48‍–‍29	47‍–‍30
Brooklyn Dodgers	87	67	.565	11	48‍–‍30	39‍–‍37
Pittsburgh Pirates	82	72	.532	16	45‍–‍34	37‍–‍38
New York Giants	78	74	.513	19	47‍–‍30	31‍–‍44
Boston Braves	67	85	.441	30	36‍–‍38	31‍–‍47
Cincinnati Reds	61	93	.396	37	36‍–‍41	25‍–‍52
Philadelphia Phillies	46	108	.299	52	22‍–‍55	24‍–‍53

=== Record vs. opponents ===
1945 National League record Sources:
Team	BSN	BRO	CHC	CIN	NYG	PHI	PIT	STL
Boston	—	9–13–1	7–15	10–12	10–10–2	14–8	7–15	10–12
Brooklyn	13–9–1	—	8–14–1	11–11	15–7	19–3	12–10	9–13
Chicago	15–7	14–8–1	—	21–1	11–11	17–5	14–8	6–16
Cincinnati	12–10	11–11	1–21	—	6–16	12–10	10–12	9–13
New York	10–10–2	7–15	11–11	16–6	—	17–5	11–11	6–16
Philadelphia	8–14	3–19	5–17	10–12	5–17	—	6–16	9–13
Pittsburgh	15–7	10–12	8–14	12–10	11–11	16–6	—	10–12–1
St. Louis	12–10	13–9	16–6	13–9	16–6	13–9	12–10–1	—

=== Roster ===
1945 Cincinnati Reds
Roster
Pitchers: 41 Boom-Boom Beck; 35 Mel Bosser; 39 Joe Bowman; 36 Guy Bush; 33 Arnold Carter; 43 Frank Dasso; 37 Howie Fox; 18 Earl Harrist; 42 Johnny Hetki; 34 Ed Heusser; 36 Vern Kennedy; 42 Hod Lisenbee; 35 Mike Modak; 38 Elmer Riddle; 31 Bucky Walters; 19 Herm Wehmeier	Catchers: 5 Joe Just; 4 Al Lakeman; 6 Johnny Riddle; 5 Al Unser; Infielders: 15 Wally Flager; 10 Frank McCormick; 16 Steve Mesner; 11 Eddie Miller; 12 Kermit Wahl; 17 Woody Williams	Outfielders: 20 Dain Clay; 22 Al Libke; 15 Eddie Lukon; 28 Hank Sauer; 21 Dick Sipek; 23 Eric Tipton; 27 Gee Walker; Other batters: 18 Ray Medeiros	Manager: 1 Bill McKechnie; Coaches: 3 Hank Gowdy; 2 Jimmie Wilson

== Player stats ==
=== Batting ===
==== Starters by position ====
Note: Pos = Position; G = Games played; AB = At bats; H = Hits; Avg. = Batting average; HR = Home runs; RBI = Runs batted in

Pos	Player	G	AB	H	Avg.	HR	RBI
C	Al Lakeman	76	258	66	.256	8	31
1B	Frank McCormick	152	580	160	.276	10	81
2B	Woody Williams	133	482	114	.237	0	27
SS	Eddie Miller	115	421	100	.238	13	49
3B	Steve Mesner	150	540	137	.254	1	52
OF	Al Libke	130	449	127	.283	4	53
OF	Eric Tipton	108	331	80	.242	5	34
OF	Dain Clay	153	656	184	.280	1	50

==== Other batters ====
Note: G = Games played; AB = At bats; H = Hits; Avg. = Batting average; HR = Home runs; RBI = Runs batted in

Player	G	AB	H	Avg.	HR	RBI
Gee Walker	106	316	80	.253	2	21
Al Unser	67	204	54	.265	3	21
Kermit Wahl	71	194	39	.201	0	10
Dick Sipek	82	156	38	.244	0	13
Hank Sauer	31	116	34	.293	5	20
Wally Flager	21	52	11	.212	0	6
Johnny Riddle	23	45	8	.178	0	2
Joe Just	14	34	5	.147	0	2
Eddie Lukon	2	8	1	.125	0	0
Ray Medeiros	1	0	0	----	0	0

=== Pitching ===
==== Starting pitchers ====
Note: G = Games pitched; IP = Innings pitched; W = Wins; L = Losses; ERA = Earned run average; SO = Strikeouts

Player	G	IP	W	L	ERA	SO
Ed Heusser	31	223.0	11	16	3.71	56
Joe Bowman	25	185.2	11	13	3.59	71
Bucky Walters	22	168.0	10	10	2.68	45
Vern Kennedy	24	157.2	5	12	4.00	38
Frank Dasso	16	95.2	4	5	3.67	39
Herm Wehmeier	2	5.0	0	1	12.60	0

==== Other pitchers ====
Note: G = Games pitched; IP = Innings pitched; W = Wins; L = Losses; ERA = Earned run average; SO = Strikeouts

Player	G	IP	W	L	ERA	SO
Howie Fox	45	164.1	8	13	4.93	54
Earl Harrist	14	62.1	2	4	3.61	15
Boom-Boom Beck	11	47.2	2	4	3.40	9
Arnold Carter	13	46.2	2	4	3.09	4
Johnny Hetki	5	32.2	1	2	3.58	9
Elmer Riddle	12	29.2	1	4	8.19	5
Mel Bosser	7	16.0	2	0	3.38	3

==== Relief pitchers ====
Note: G = Games pitched; W = Wins; L = Losses; SV = Saves; ERA = Earned run average; SO = Strikeouts

Player	G	W	L	SV	ERA	SO
Hod Lisenbee	31	1	3	1	5.49	14
Mike Modak	20	1	2	1	5.74	7
Guy Bush	4	0	0	1	8.31	1
Al Libke	4	0	0	0	0.00	2

== Farm system ==
Level	Team	League	Manager
AA	Syracuse Chiefs	International League	Jewel Ens
A1	Birmingham Barons	Southern Association	Frank Snyder
C	Raleigh Capitals	Carolina League	Charles Carroll
D	Lima Reds	Ohio State League	Cap Crossley
