= Battery (baseball) =

Baseball term for pitcher and catcher

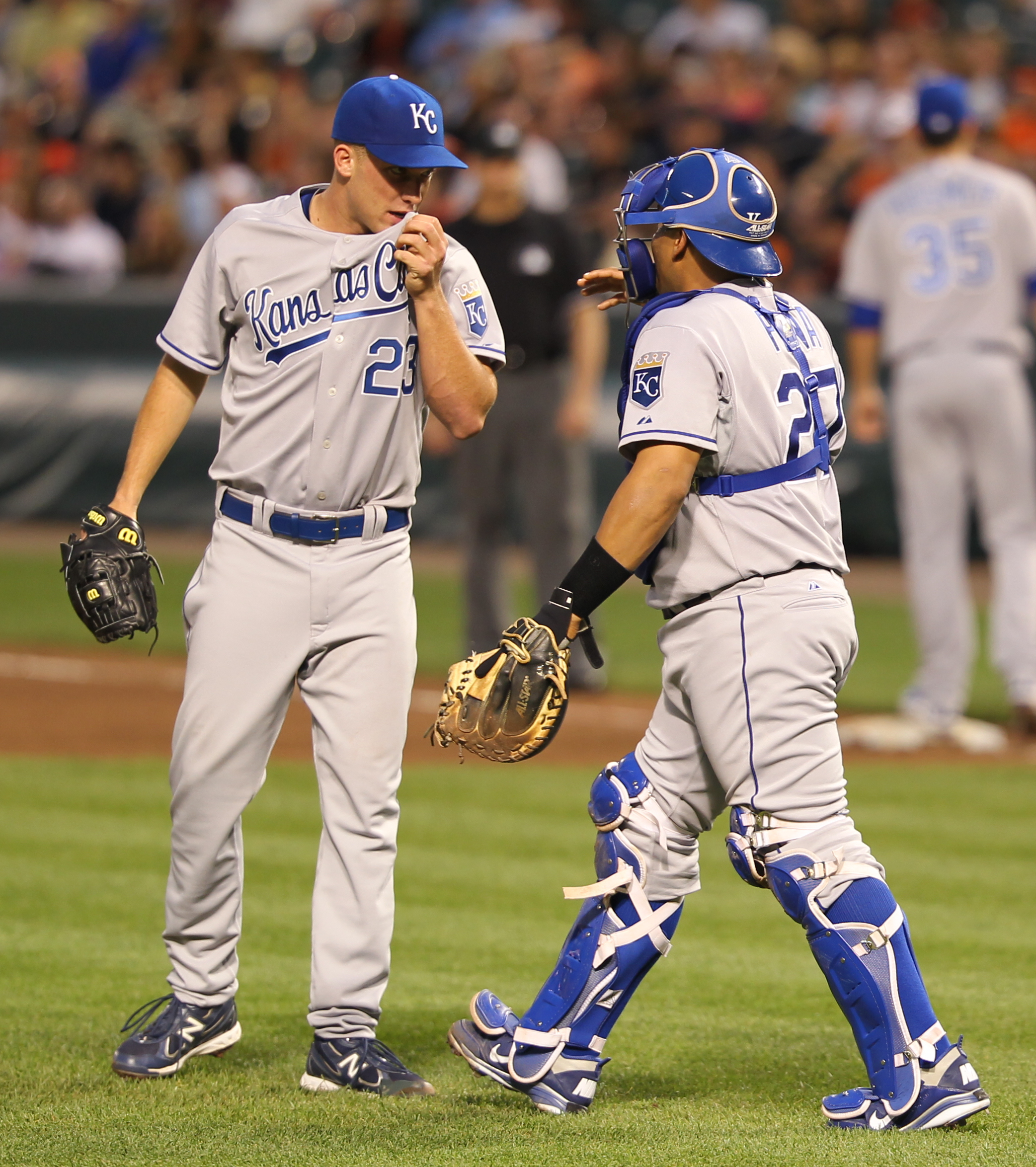
A baseball team's pitcher and catcher are referred to collectively as its 'battery'.

In baseball, the battery is the pitcher and the catcher, who may also be called batterymen, or batterymates in relation to one another.

== History ==
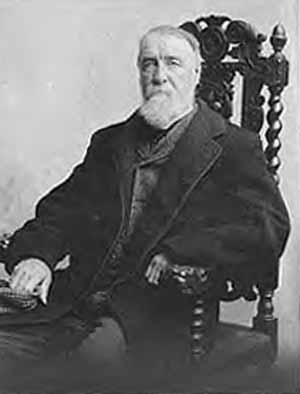
Henry Chadwick gave baseball jargon the term "battery".

=== Origins of the term ===
The use of the term battery in baseball was coined by Henry Chadwick in the 1860s in reference to the firepower of a team's pitching staff and inspired by the artillery batteries then in use in the American Civil War. Later, the term evolved to indicate the combined effectiveness of pitcher and catcher.

=== Pitching to a preferred batterymate ===
Throughout the history of baseball, although teams have typically carried multiple catchers, star pitchers have often preferred the familiarity of working consistently with a single batterymate.

In the early 20th century, some prominent pitchers were known to have picked their favorite catchers. Sportswriter Fred Lieb recalls the batteries of Christy Mathewson / Frank Bowerman beginning in 1899 with the New York Giants, Jack Coombs / Jack Lapp beginning in 1908 with the Philadelphia Athletics, Cy Young / Lou Criger gaining the greatest attention in 1901 with the Boston Americans (later the Red Sox), and Grover Cleveland Alexander / Bill Killefer beginning in 1911 with the Philadelphia Phillies. Other successful batteries were Ed Walsh / Billy Sullivan beginning in 1904, along with Walter Johnson / Muddy Ruel and Dazzy Vance / Hank DeBerry both starting in 1923.

In 1976, several major league pitchers chose their preferred catchers; a notion that had fallen out of practice for some decades. For instance, catcher Bob Boone of the Philadelphia Phillies, though one of the best catchers of his day, was replaced with Tim McCarver at the request of pitcher Steve Carlton. The Carlton/McCarver combination worked well in 32 out of Carlton's 35 games that season, plus one playoff game. The two had previously been batterymates for four years (1966–69) with the St. Louis Cardinals. Another battery-by-choice was superstitious rookie pitcher Mark Fidrych who was new to the Detroit Tigers in 1976, insisting on rookie catcher Bruce Kimm behind the plate. The Fidrych/Kimm combination started all 29 of Fidrych's 1976 season games. The two continued as a battery through 1977.

Knuckleballers have often preferred pitching to "personal" batterymates due to the difficulty of catching the unusual pitch. One notable example was Boston Red Sox pitcher Tim Wakefield and his preferred catcher, Doug Mirabelli.

== Most starts ==
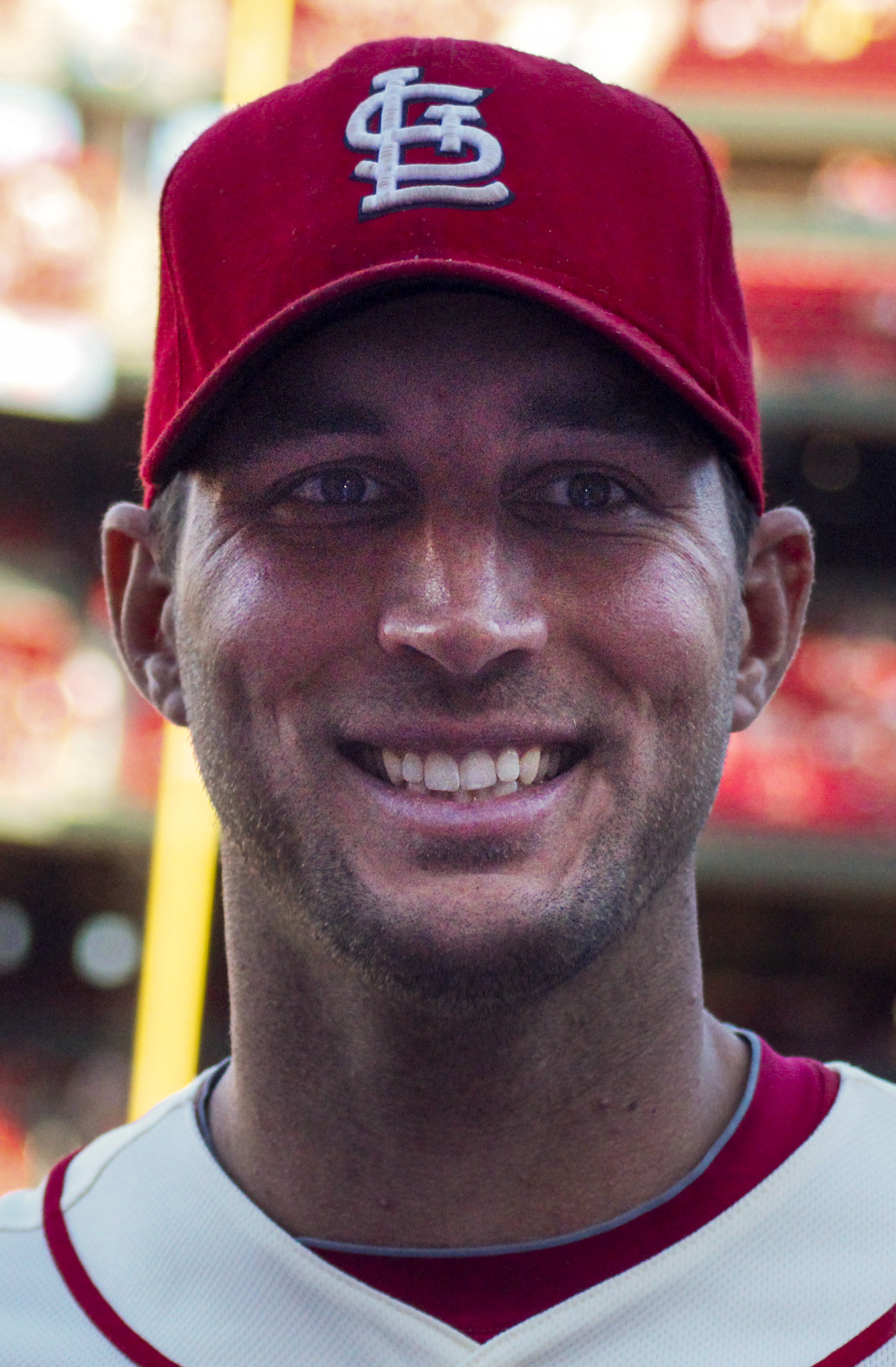
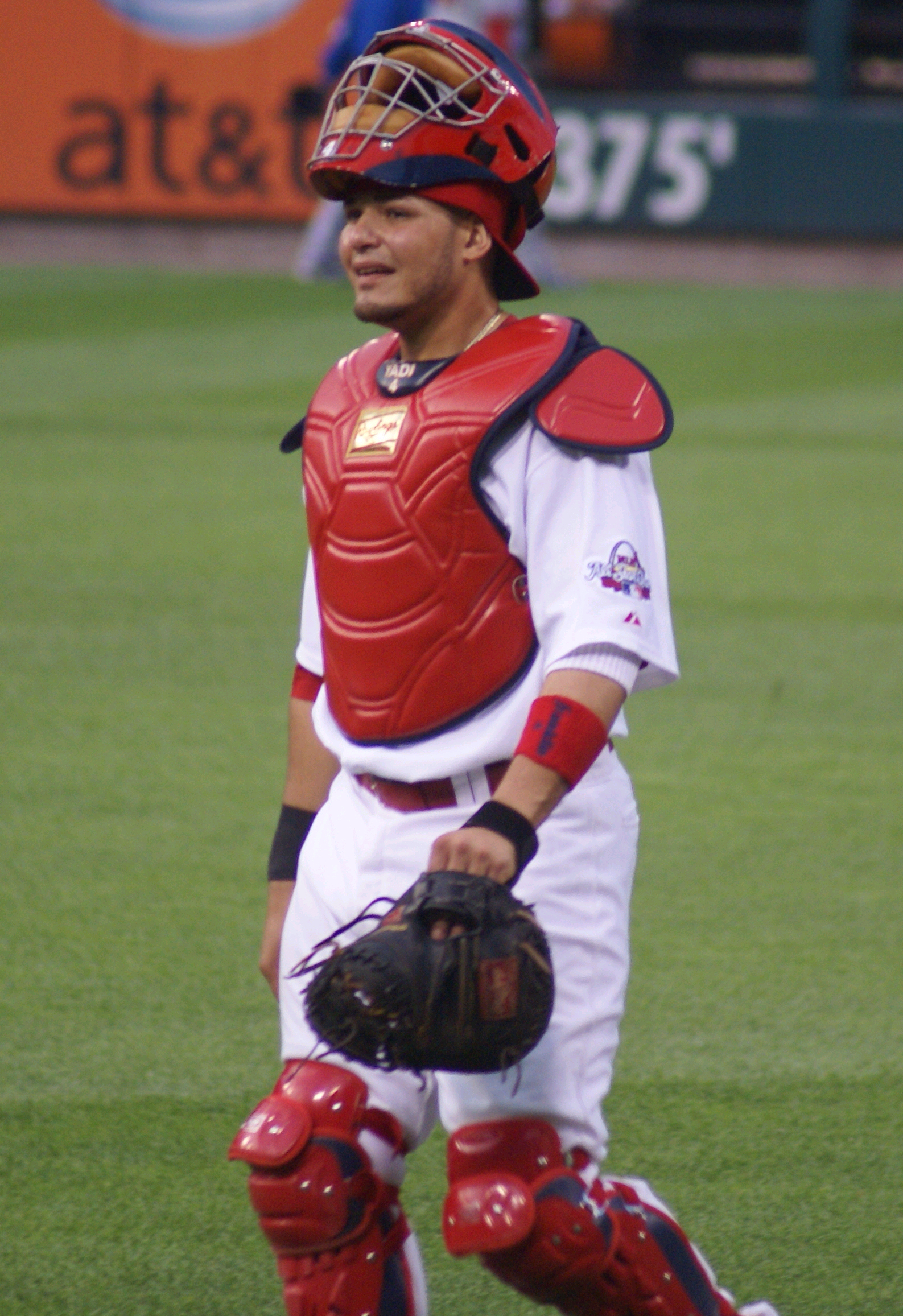
Adam Wainwright and Yadier Molina started a record 328 games as a battery for the St. Louis Cardinals, and also hold the record for team wins by a starting battery (213).
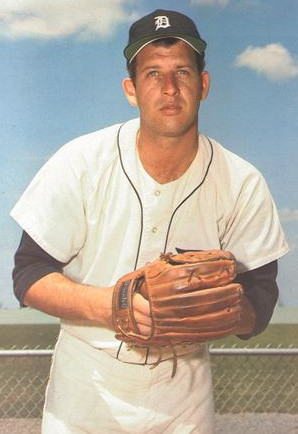
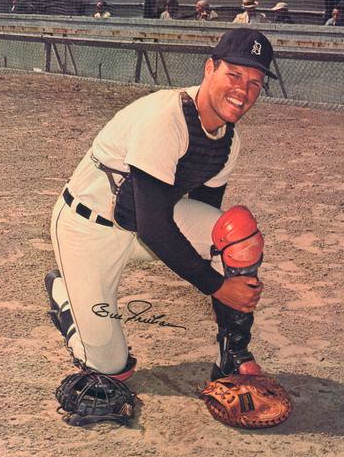
Mickey Lolich and Bill Freehan started 324 games as a battery for the Detroit Tigers.
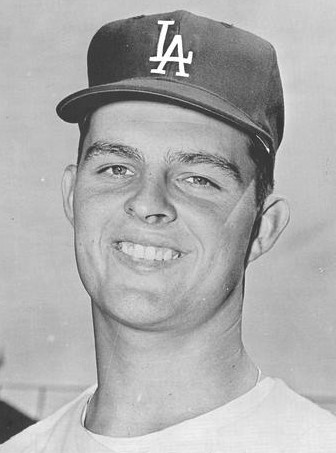
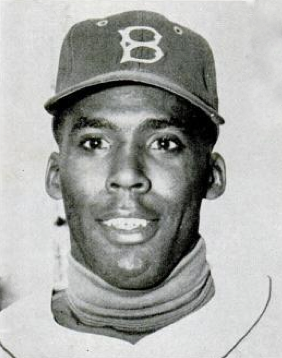
Hall of Fame hurlers Don Drysdale and Sandy Koufax each started over 200 games with Dodgers batterymate John Roseboro (center).

The below table shows battery-mates that as of September 20, 2022, have appeared in more than 200 starts together since 1914.

Especially notable are the five Hall of Fame batteries below, including Lefty Grove (ranked by Bill James as the second-greatest pitcher of all time) and Mickey Cochrane (ranked by James as the eighth-greatest catcher) of the 1925–1933 Philadelphia Athletics, and Yogi Berra and Whitey Ford, who appeared in multiple World Series together for the New York Yankees between 1950 and 1963.

Games started	Pitcher	Catcher	Years	Team
328	Adam Wainwright	Yadier Molina	2007–2022	St. Louis Cardinals
324	Mickey Lolich	Bill Freehan	1963–1975	Detroit Tigers
316	Warren Spahn	Del Crandall	1949–1963	Boston / Milwaukee Braves
306	Red Faber	Ray Schalk	1914–1926	Chicago White Sox
283	Don Drysdale	John Roseboro	1957–1967	Brooklyn / Los Angeles Dodgers
282	Red Ruffing	Bill Dickey	1930–1946	New York Yankees
270	Steve Rogers	Gary Carter	1975–1984	Montreal Expos
264	Bob Lemon	Jim Hegan	1946–1957	Cleveland Indians
250	Early Wynn	Jim Hegan	1949–1957	Cleveland Indians
248	Tom Glavine	Javy Lopez	1994–2002	Atlanta Braves
247	Lefty Gomez	Bill Dickey	1931–1942	New York Yankees
240	Bob Feller	Jim Hegan	1941–1956	Cleveland Indians
239	Fernando Valenzuela	Mike Scioscia	1981–1990	Los Angeles Dodgers
237	Stan Coveleski	Steve O'Neill	1916–1923	Cleveland Indians
237	Tom Seaver	Jerry Grote	1967–1977	New York Mets
230	Lew Burdette	Del Crandall	1953–1963	Milwaukee Braves
228	Steve Carlton	Tim McCarver	1965–1969, 1972–1979	St. Louis Cardinals, Philadelphia Phillies
224	Lefty Grove	Mickey Cochrane	1925–1933	Philadelphia Athletics
221	Paul Derringer	Ernie Lombardi	1933–1941	Cincinnati Reds
212	Whitey Ford	Yogi Berra	1950–1963	New York Yankees
208	Sandy Koufax	John Roseboro	1957–1966	Brooklyn / Los Angeles Dodgers
208	Mike Flanagan	Rick Dempsey	1976–1986	Baltimore Orioles
207	Jack Morris	Lance Parrish	1978–1986	Detroit Tigers
207	Cole Hamels	Carlos Ruiz	2006–2015	Philadelphia Phillies
203	Rube Walberg	Mickey Cochrane	1925–1933	Philadelphia Athletics
203	Billy Pierce	Sherm Lollar	1952–1961	Chicago White Sox
202	Dave Stieb	Ernie Whitt	1980–1989	Toronto Blue Jays

Member of the Baseball Hall of Fame

== Most no-hitters ==
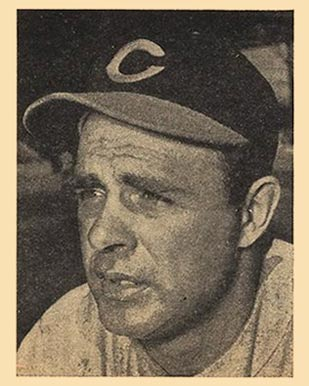
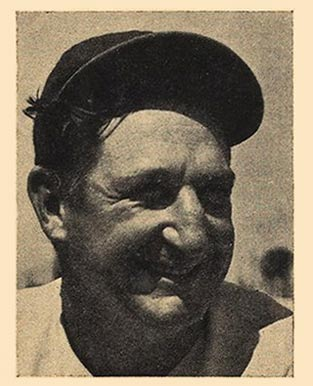
Reds hurler Johnny Vander Meer and Hall of Fame catcher Ernie Lombardi recorded two no-hitters in a span of five days in June 1938.
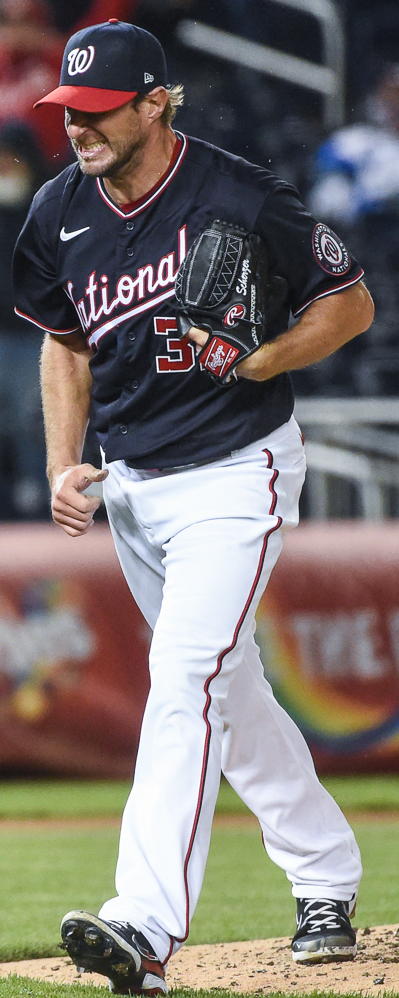
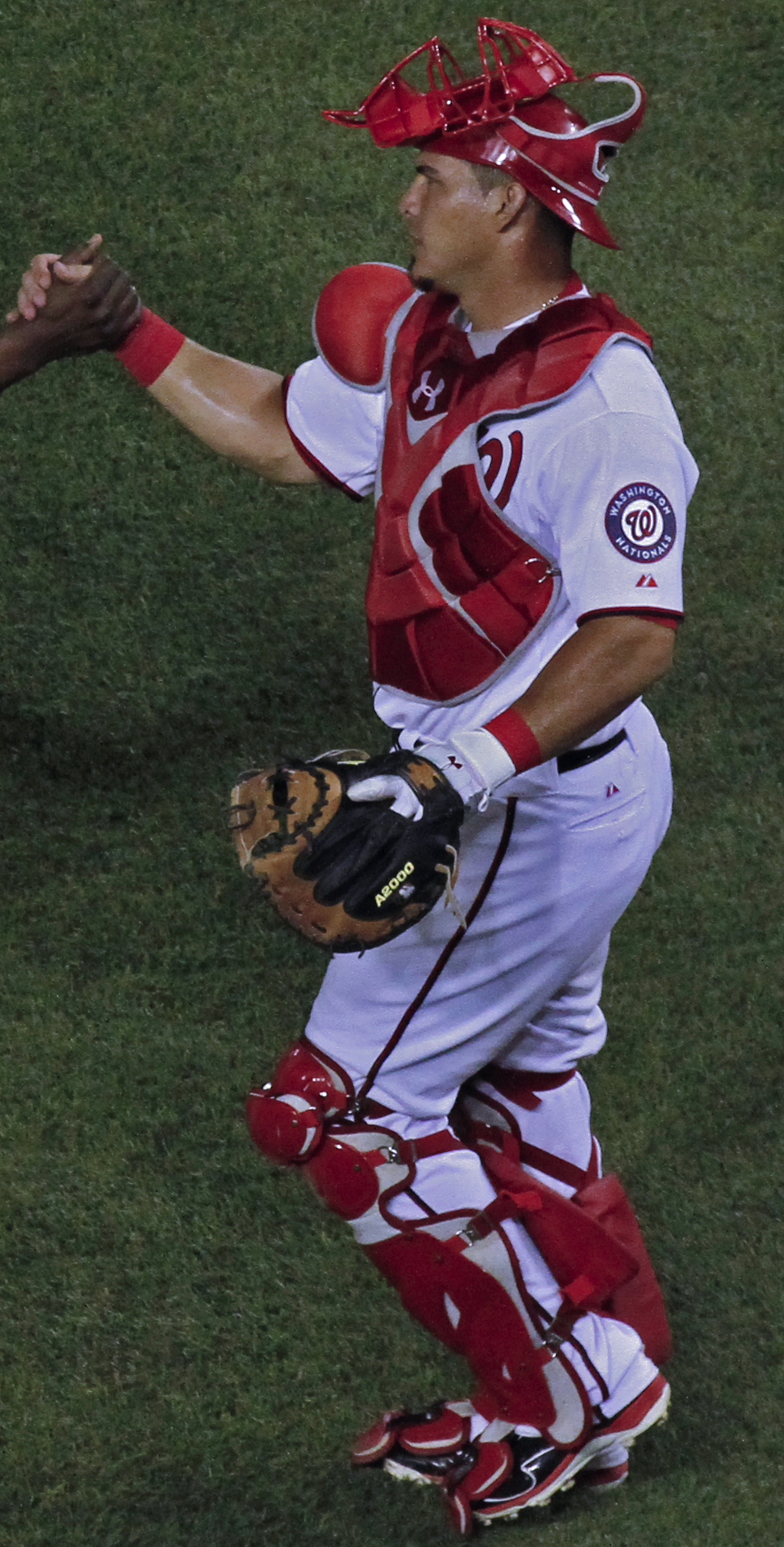
The battery of Max Scherzer and Wilson Ramos recorded two no-hitters for the Washington Nationals in 2015.

The table below lists the battery combinations that share the record for most major league no-hitters (2).

No-Hit Games	Pitcher	Catcher	Date	Team	Ref
2*	Larry Corcoran	Silver Flint	August 19, 1880	Chicago White Stockings	
2*	Larry Corcoran	Silver Flint	September 20, 1882	Chicago White Stockings	
2*	Larry Corcoran	King Kelly	August 19, 1880	Chicago White Stockings	
2*	Larry Corcoran	King Kelly	June 27, 1884	Chicago White Stockings	
2	Pud Galvin	Jack Rowe	August 20, 1880	Buffalo Bisons	
2	Pud Galvin	Jack Rowe	August 4, 1884	Buffalo Bisons	
2	Adonis Terry	Jimmy Peoples	July 24, 1886	Brooklyn Grays	
2	Adonis Terry	Jimmy Peoples	May 27, 1888	Brooklyn Bridegrooms	
2	Cy Young	Lou Criger	May 5, 1904	Boston Americans	
2	Cy Young	Lou Criger	June 30, 1908	Boston Red Sox	
2	Addie Joss	Nig Clarke	October 2, 1908	Cleveland Naps	
2	Addie Joss	Nig Clarke	April 20, 1910	Cleveland Naps	
2	Johnny Vander Meer	Ernie Lombardi	June 11, 1938	Cincinnati Reds	
2	Johnny Vander Meer	Ernie Lombardi	June 15, 1938	Cincinnati Reds	
2	Allie Reynolds	Yogi Berra	July 12, 1951	New York Yankees	
2	Allie Reynolds	Yogi Berra	September 28, 1951	New York Yankees	
2	Carl Erskine	Roy Campanella	June 19, 1952	Brooklyn Dodgers	
2	Carl Erskine	Roy Campanella	May 12, 1956	Brooklyn Dodgers	
2	Sandy Koufax	John Roseboro	June 30, 1962	Los Angeles Dodgers	
2	Sandy Koufax	John Roseboro	May 11, 1963	Los Angeles Dodgers	
2	Steve Busby	Fran Healy	April 27, 1973	Kansas City Royals	
2	Steve Busby	Fran Healy	June 19, 1974	Kansas City Royals	
2	Roy Halladay	Carlos Ruiz	May 29, 2010	Philadelphia Phillies	
2	Roy Halladay	Carlos Ruiz	October 6, 2010	Philadelphia Phillies	
2	Homer Bailey	Ryan Hanigan	September 28, 2012	Cincinnati Reds	
2	Homer Bailey	Ryan Hanigan	July 2, 2013	Cincinnati Reds	
2	Max Scherzer	Wilson Ramos	June 20, 2015	Washington Nationals	
2	Max Scherzer	Wilson Ramos	October 3, 2015	Washington Nationals	

(*) Catchers Silver Flint and King Kelly shared catching duties for Corcoran's August 19, 1880 no-hitter.
Member of the Baseball Hall of Fame

== Sibling batteries ==
The following chart of major league sibling batteries lists pitcher/catcher siblings who played on the same major league team during a single major league season. The pair may or may not have performed as a battery in an actual major league game.

Unique among those listed below are Mort and Walker Cooper, who formed the National League's starting battery at both the 1942 and 1943 Major League Baseball All-Star Games, and also appeared as a battery in the 1942, 1943, and 1944 World Series, the only sibling battery to achieve either feat.

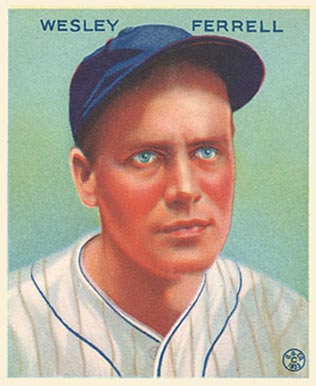
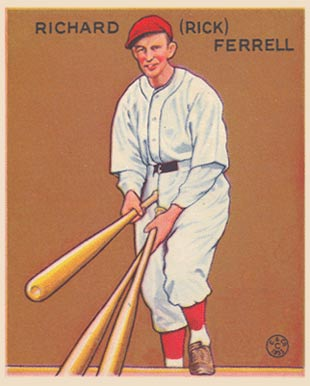
Baseball Hall of Famer Rick Ferrell and brother Wes formed a battery for the Boston Red Sox and the Washington Senators in the 1930s.
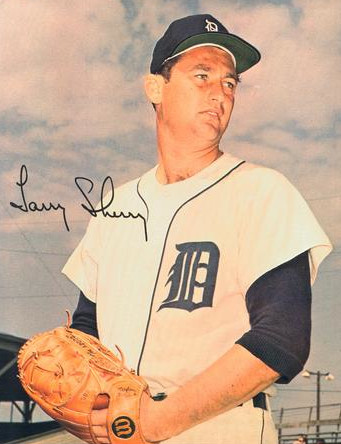
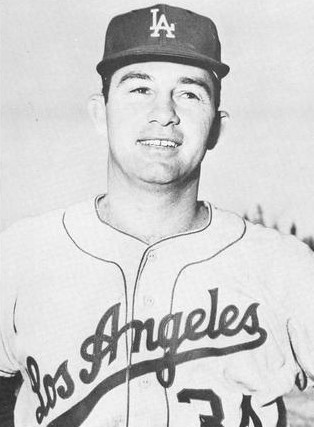
Larry and Norm Sherry formed a battery for the Los Angeles Dodgers from 1959 to 1962.
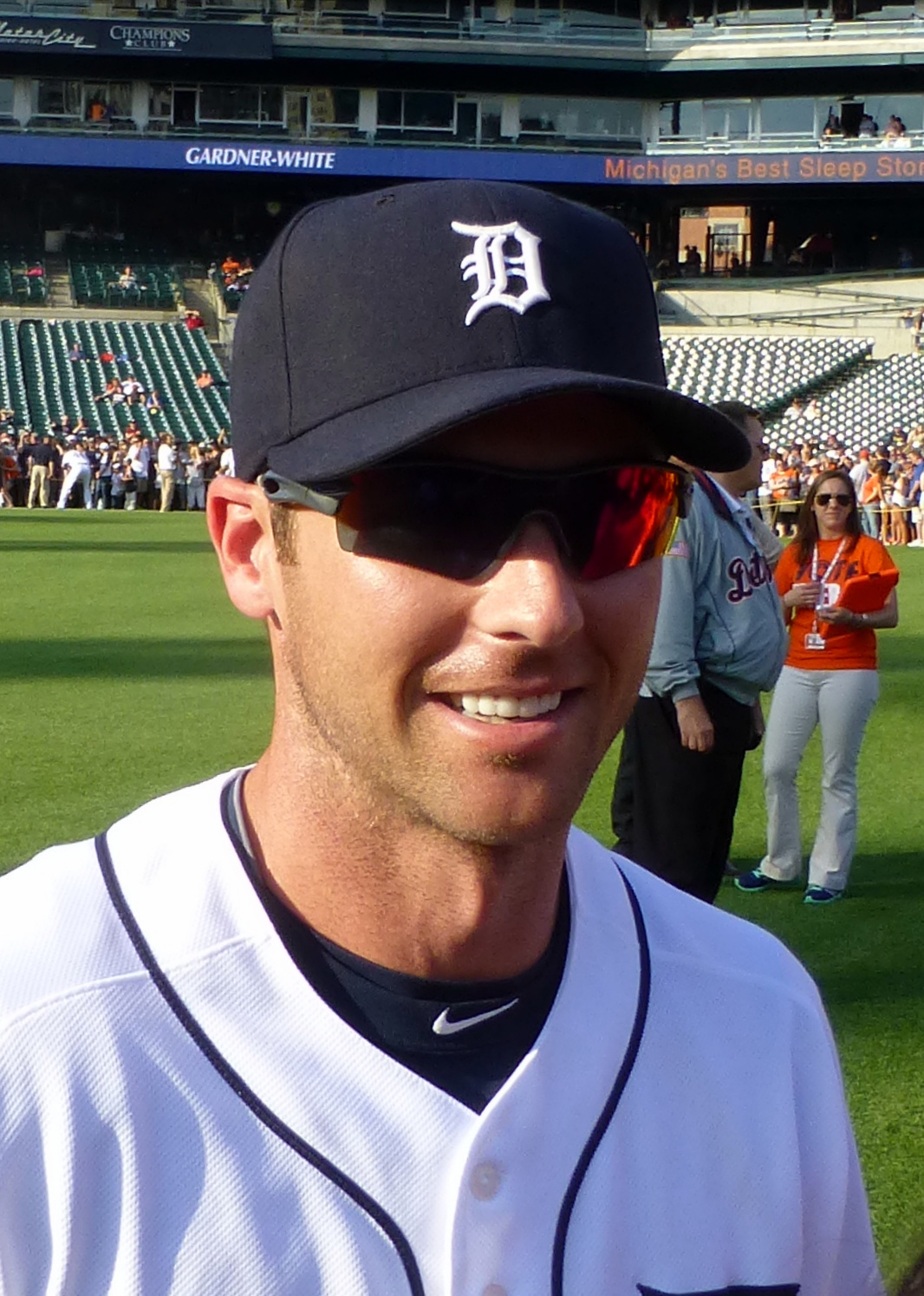
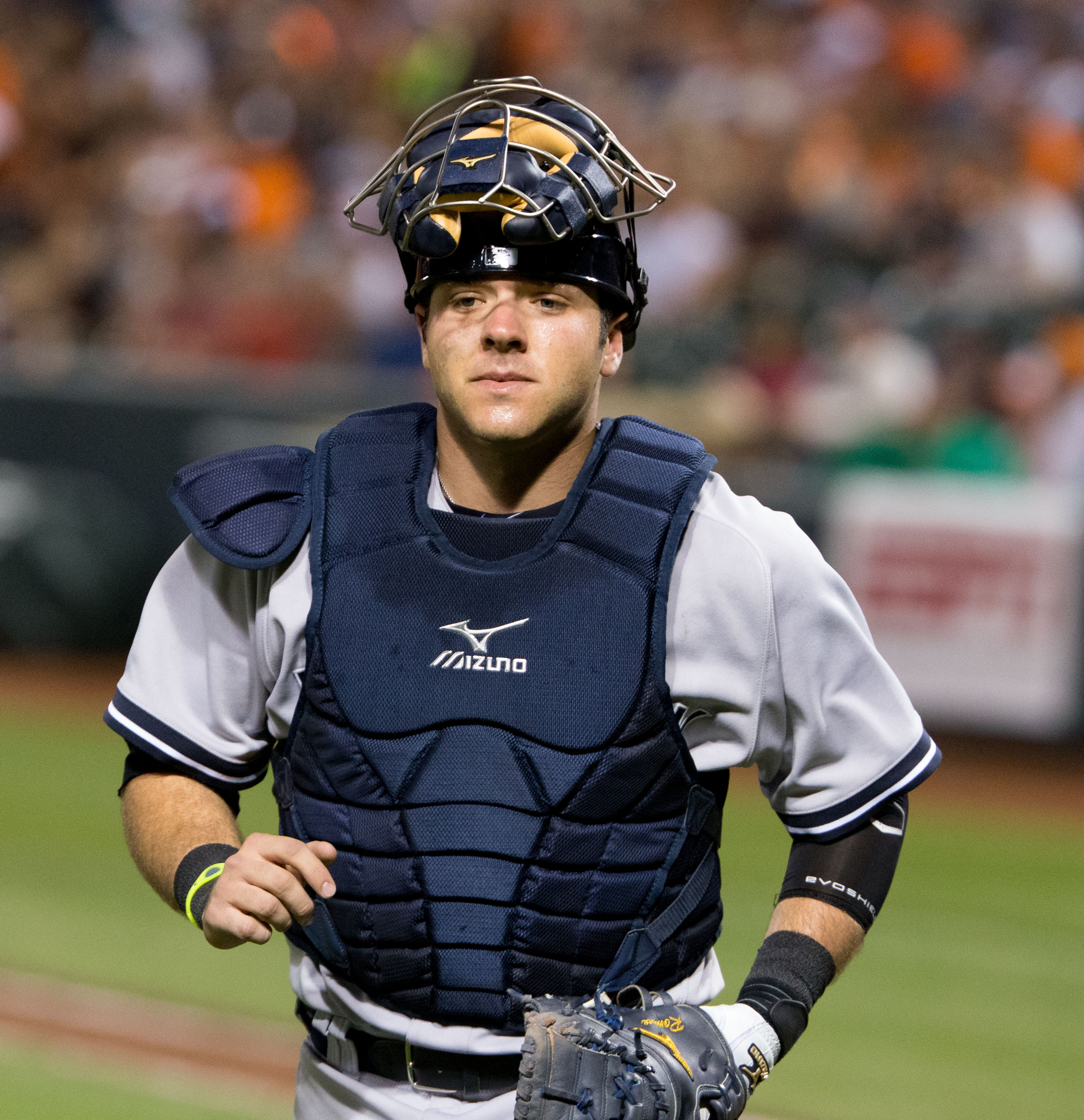
Utility infielder Andrew Romine pitched to brother Austin for one inning in a blowout loss for the 2021 Chicago Cubs.

Team(s)	Pitcher	Catcher
1877 Boston Red Caps; 1878 Cincinnati Reds; 1879 Cincinnati Reds	Will White	Deacon White
1884 Richmond Virginians	Ed Dugan	Bill Dugan
1885 Buffalo Bisons	Pete Wood	Fred Wood
1886 Baltimore Orioles	Dick Conway	Bill Conway
1890 New York Giants (PL); 1891 New York Giants	John Ewing	Buck Ewing
1902 St. Louis Cardinals; 1903 St. Louis Cardinals	Mike O'Neill	Jack O'Neill
1912 New York Highlanders	Tommy Thompson	Homer Thompson
1914 Boston Braves	Lefty Tyler	Fred Tyler
1924 St. Louis Stars	George Mitchell	Robert Mitchell
1927 Kansas City Monarchs	Maurice Young	Tom Young
1929 Boston Red Sox	Milt Gaston	Alex Gaston
1932 Cuban Stars (East); 1933 Cuban Stars (East); 1934 Cuban Stars (East); 1939 New York Cubans; 1944 New York Cubans	Rudy Fernández	José Fernández
1934 Boston Red Sox; 1935 Boston Red Sox; 1936 Boston Red Sox; 1937 Boston Red Sox; 1937 Washington Senators; 1938 Washington Senators	Wes Ferrell	Rick Ferrell
1940 St. Louis Cardinals; 1941 St. Louis Cardinals; 1942 St. Louis Cardinals; 1943 St. Louis Cardinals; 1944 St. Louis Cardinals; 1945 St. Louis Cardinals; 1947 New York Giants	Mort Cooper	Walker Cooper
1941 Cincinnati Reds; 1944 Cincinnati Reds; 1945 Cincinnati Reds; 1948 Pittsburgh Pirates	Elmer Riddle	Johnny Riddle
1954 Philadelphia Athletics; 1955 Kansas City Athletics; 1960 New York Yankees	Bobby Shantz	Billy Shantz
1959 Cincinnati Reds	Jim Bailey	Ed Bailey
1959 Los Angeles Dodgers; 1960 Los Angeles Dodgers; 1961 Los Angeles Dodgers; 1962 Los Angeles Dodgers	Larry Sherry	Norm Sherry
2021 Chicago Cubs	Andrew Romine	Austin Romine

Member of the Baseball Hall of Fame

== Other records and firsts ==
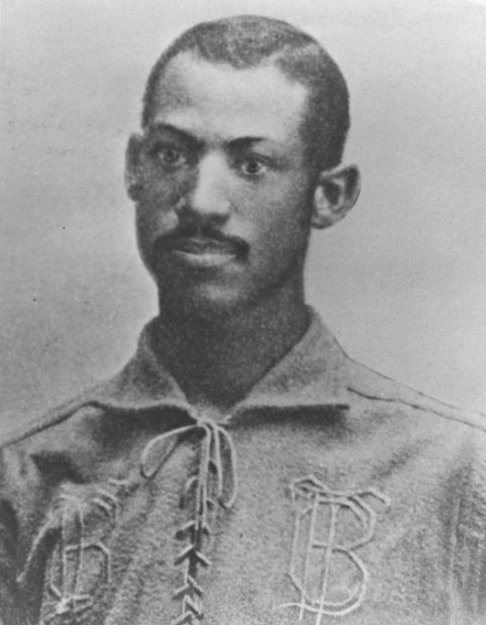
Catcher Moses Fleetwood Walker (pictured) and George Stovey formed professional baseball's first Black battery.

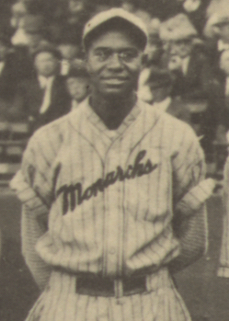
Frank Duncan Jr (pictured) and his son, Frank Duncan III of the 1941 Kansas City Monarchs are thought to be the only major league father/son battery.

=== Most games ===
The battery that appeared in the most games together was Mariano Rivera and Jorge Posada, with 598 games together for the New York Yankees between 1995 and 2011.

=== Most wins ===
The record for most team wins by a starting battery is 213 by Adam Wainwright and Yadier Molina.

=== Most innings ===
Red Faber and Ray Schalk, who played together for the Chicago White Sox between 1914 and 1928, recorded the most total innings as a battery (2553.2).

=== Single-game records ===
Madison Bumgarner and Buster Posey of the San Francisco Giants became the major league's first battery to hit grand slams in the same game when they accomplished the feat on July 13, 2014 against the Arizona Diamondbacks. The home run was pitcher Bumgarner's second grand slam of the season (April 11).

=== First Black battery ===
Pitcher George Stovey and catcher Moses Fleetwood Walker formed the first Black battery in professional baseball history when they teamed up for the 1887 Newark Little Giants of the International Association. The tandem recorded ten consecutive wins to begin the season before the Chicago White Stockings refused to take the field on July 15, leading to the league's implementation of the color line.

=== Father-son batteries ===
Frank Duncan, Jr. and his son, Frank Duncan III, of the 1941 Kansas City Monarchs are thought to be the only father-son battery in major league history.

In a game on September 7, 2012, former major leaguer Roger Clemens came out of retirement to pitch for the minor league Sugar Land Skeeters of the Atlantic League of Professional Baseball, and formed a battery with his son Koby Clemens.

=== First battery composed of 1st overall selections ===
Paul Skenes and Henry Davis of the Pittsburgh Pirates formed the first major league battery where both the pitcher and catcher were selected first overall in their respective draft years, 2023 and 2021.

== See also ==
- Glossary of baseball terms
