= 1941 Cincinnati Reds season =

1941 Cincinnati Reds
- League: National League
- Ballpark: Crosley Field
- City: Cincinnati
- Record: 88–66 (.571)
- League place: 3rd
- Owners: Powel Crosley Jr.
- General managers: Warren Giles
- Managers: Bill McKechnie
- Radio: WCPO (Harry Hartman); WSAI (Roger Baker, Dick Bray)

The 1941 Cincinnati Reds season was a season in American baseball. The team finished third in the National League with a record of 88–66, 12 games behind the Brooklyn Dodgers.

== Offseason ==
- December 12, 1940: Milt Shoffner was traded by the Reds to the New York Giants for Wayne Ambler.
- Prior to 1941 season: Grant Dunlap was signed as an amateur free agent by the Reds.

== Regular season ==
=== Season standings ===
National League
Team	W	L	Pct.	GB	Home	Road
Brooklyn Dodgers	100	54	.649	—	52‍–‍25	48‍–‍29
St. Louis Cardinals	97	56	.634	2½	53‍–‍24	44‍–‍32
Cincinnati Reds	88	66	.571	12	45‍–‍34	43‍–‍32
Pittsburgh Pirates	81	73	.526	19	45‍–‍32	36‍–‍41
New York Giants	74	79	.484	25½	38‍–‍39	36‍–‍40
Chicago Cubs	70	84	.455	30	38‍–‍39	32‍–‍45
Boston Braves	62	92	.403	38	32‍–‍44	30‍–‍48
Philadelphia Phillies	43	111	.279	57	23‍–‍52	20‍–‍59

=== Record vs. opponents ===
1941 National League record Sources:
Team	BSN	BRO	CHC	CIN	NYG	PHI	PIT	STL
Boston	—	4–18–2	11–11	9–13	6–16	14–8	10–12	8–14
Brooklyn	18–4–2	—	13–9	14–8	14–8	18–4	12–10	11–11–1
Chicago	11–11	9–13	—	8–14	9–13	14–8–1	9–13	10–12
Cincinnati	13–9	8–14	14–8	—	15–7	16–6	12–10	10–12
New York	16–6	8–14	13–9	7–15	—	16–6	8–14–2	6–15–1
Philadelphia	8–14	4–18	8–14–1	6–16	6–16	—	6–16	5–17
Pittsburgh	12–10	10–12	13–9	10–12	14–8–2	16–6	—	6–16
St. Louis	14–8	11–11–1	12–10	12–10	15–6–1	17–5	16–6	—

=== Notable transactions ===
- June 21, 1941: Jimmy Ripple was purchased from the Reds by the St. Louis Cardinals.

=== Roster ===
1941 Cincinnati Reds
Roster
Pitchers: 36,43 Joe Beggs; 30 Paul Derringer; 40 Johnny Hutchings; 40 Bob Logan; 35 Whitey Moore; 32 Monte Pearson; 41 Elmer Riddle; 37 Ray Starr; 39 Junior Thompson; 34 Jim Turner; 33 Johnny Vander Meer; 31 Bucky Walters	Catchers: 6 Bill Baker; 9 Ray Lamanno; 4 Ernie Lombardi; 7 Johnny Riddle; 5 Dick West; Infielders: 16 Chuck Aleno; 11 Lonny Frey; 17 Eddie Joost; 15 Bobby Mattick; 10 Frank McCormick; 18 Billy Werber; 12 Pep Young; 12 Benny Zientara	Outfielders: 23 Harry Craft; 21 Jim Gleeson; 24 Ival Goodman; 25 Ernie Koy; 26 Eddie Lukon; 20 Mike McCormick; 22 Jimmy Ripple; 28 Hank Sauer; 27 Lloyd Waner; Other batters: 19 Eddie Shokes	Manager: 1 Bill McKechnie; Coaches: 3 Jewel Ens; 2 Hank Gowdy

== Player stats ==
= Indicates team leader

=== Batting ===
==== Starters by position ====
Note: Pos = Position; G = Games played; AB = At bats; H = Hits; Avg. = Batting average; HR = Home runs; RBI = Runs batted in

Pos	Player	G	AB	H	Avg.	HR	RBI
C	Ernie Lombardi	117	398	105	.264	10	60
1B	Frank McCormick	154	603	162	.269	17	97
2B	Lonny Frey	146	543	138	.254	6	59
SS	Eddie Joost	152	537	136	.253	4	40
3B	Billy Werber	109	418	100	.239	4	46
OF	Mike McCormick	110	369	106	.287	4	31
OF	Harry Craft	119	413	103	.249	10	59
OF	Jim Gleeson	102	301	70	.233	3	34

==== Other batters ====
Note: G = Games played; AB = At bats; H = Hits; Avg. = Batting average; HR = Home runs; RBI = Runs batted in

Player	G	AB	H	Avg.	HR	RBI
Ernie Koy	67	204	51	.250	2	27
Dick West	67	172	37	.215	1	17
Chuck Aleno	54	169	41	.243	1	18
Lloyd Waner	55	164	42	.256	0	6
Ival Goodman	42	149	40	.268	1	12
Jimmy Ripple	38	102	22	.216	1	9
Eddie Lukon	23	86	23	.267	0	3
Bobby Mattick	20	60	11	.183	0	7
Hank Sauer	9	33	10	.303	0	5
Benny Zientara	9	21	6	.286	0	2
Pep Young	4	12	2	.167	0	0
Johnny Riddle	10	10	3	.300	0	0
Bill Baker	2	1	0	.000	0	0
Eddie Shokes	1	1	0	.000	0	0
Ray Lamanno	1	0	0	----	0	0

=== Pitching ===
= Indicates league leader

==== Starting pitchers ====
Note: G = Games pitched; IP = Innings pitched; W = Wins; L = Losses; ERA = Earned run average; SO = Strikeouts

Player	G	IP	W	L	ERA	SO
Bucky Walters	37	302.0	19	15	2.83	129
Paul Derringer	29	228.1	12	14	3.31	76
Johnny Vander Meer	33	226.1	16	13	2.82	202
Elmer Riddle	33	216.2	19	4	2.24	80

==== Other pitchers ====
Note: G = Games pitched; IP = Innings pitched; W = Wins; L = Losses; ERA = Earned run average; SO = Strikeouts

Player	G	IP	W	L	ERA	SO
Jim Turner	23	113.0	6	4	3.11	34
Gene Thompson	27	109.0	6	6	4.87	46
Whitey Moore	23	61.2	2	1	4.38	17
Ray Starr	7	34.0	3	2	2.65	11
Monte Pearson	7	24.1	1	3	5.18	8

==== Relief pitchers ====
Note: G = Games pitched; W = Wins; L = Losses; SV = Saves; ERA = Earned run average; SO = Strikeouts

Player	G	W	L	SV	ERA	SO
Joe Beggs	37	4	3	5	3.79	19
Johnny Hutchings	8	0	0	0	4.09	5
Bob Logan	2	0	1	0	8.10	0

== Farm system ==
Level	Team	League	Manager
AA	Indianapolis Indians	American Association	Red Killefer
A1	Birmingham Barons	Southern Association	Oscar Roettger
B	Columbia Reds	Sally League	Cap Crossley
C	Tucson Cowboys	Arizona–Texas League	Lester "Pat" Patterson
C	Riverside Reds	California League	Einar Sorensen
C	Ogden Reds	Pioneer League	Bill McCorry
D	Cordele Bees	Georgia–Florida League	Bill Morrell
D	Wichita Falls Spudders	West Texas–New Mexico League	Sammy Hale and Neal Rabe

LEAGUE CHAMPIONS: Columbia, Tucson, Ogden
Riverside franchise folded, June 29, 1941
