= Claude Corbitt =

American baseball player (1915–1978)

- Infielder
- Born: July 21, 1915; Sunbury, North Carolina, U.S.
- Died: May 1, 1978 (aged 62); Cincinnati, Ohio, U.S.
- Batted: Right Threw: Right

MLB debut
- September 23, 1945, for the Brooklyn Dodgers

Last MLB appearance
- August 21, 1949, for the Cincinnati Reds

MLB statistics
- Batting average: .243
- Home runs: 1
- Runs scored: 60
- Stats at Baseball Reference

Teams
- Brooklyn Dodgers (1945); Cincinnati Reds (1946, 1948–1949)

Claude Elliott Corbitt (July 21, 1915 – May 1, 1978) was an American professional baseball player, an infielder who appeared in 215 Major League games over four seasons for the Brooklyn Dodgers (1945) and the Cincinnati Reds (1946; 1948–1949). The native of Sunbury, North Carolina, attended Duke University. He threw and batted right-handed, stood 5 feet 10 inches (1.78 m) tall and weighed 170 pounds (77 kg).

Corbitt's professional career began in minor league baseball in 1937, and was interrupted by almost four full seasons of military service with the United States Army Air Force during World War II. He joined the military in January 1942, was commissioned a lieutenant, and earned his wings. He was discharged late in the 1945 Major League season, but was able to make his big-league debut, at age 30, on September 23 as a defensive replacement for Dodger third baseman Augie Galan. Seven days later, he started at third base against the Philadelphia Phillies, and singled twice against Hugh Mulcahy in the season's final game.

On March 18, 1946, the Dodgers sold his contract to Cincinnati, and Corbitt spent the remainder of his MLB career with the Reds, including the full seasons of 1946 and 1948. In 1946, Corbitt nearly split the Reds' shortstop job with Eddie Miller, starting 69 games to Miller's 86. But Corbitt batted only .248 and spent all of 1947 with the Triple-A Syracuse Chiefs. He won a roster spot with the 1948 Reds, however, and was one of four players who shared the second base job that year. Corbitt started 45 games at second (behind Bobby Adams and Benny Zientara), and batted .256. In 1949, his final season in the Majors, Corbitt got into 44 games for Cincinnati, starting 25 defensively, but hit only .181 and spent part of the year with Triple-A Syracuse.

All told, Corbitt registered 153 hits in the Major Leagues, including 22 doubles and one triple. His lone home run, a solo blast, came September 13, 1946, off Johnny Gee of the New York Giants.

Corbitt retired after the 1953 minor league season and died in Cincinnati on May 1, 1978, at the age of 62.
