= Andrew Romine =

American baseball player (born 1985)

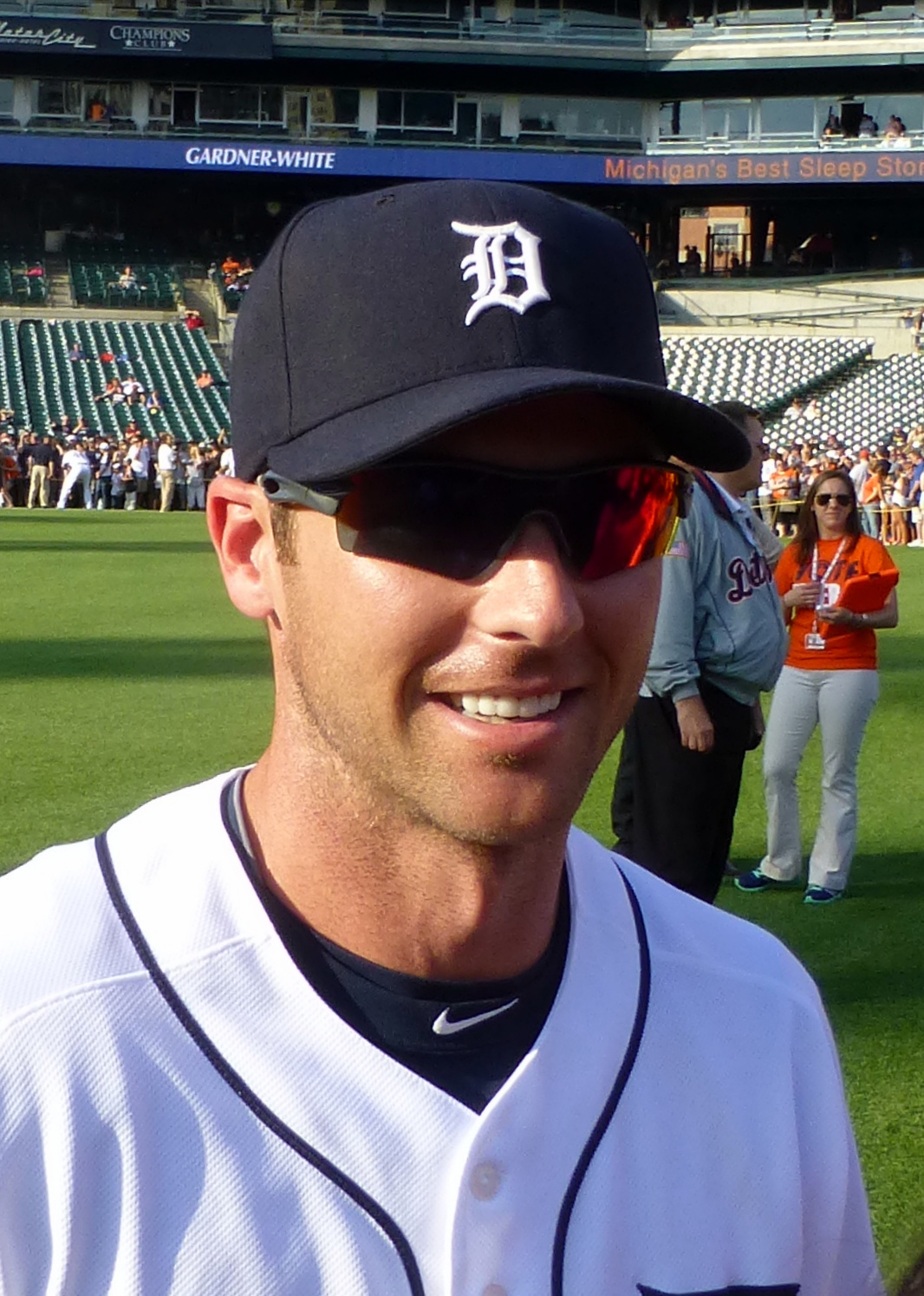
- Romine with the Detroit Tigers
- Utility player
- Born: December 24, 1985 (age 40); Winter Haven, Florida, U.S.
- Batted: Switch Threw: Right

MLB debut
- September 24, 2010, for the Los Angeles Angels of Anaheim

Last MLB appearance
- September 5, 2021, for the Chicago Cubs

MLB statistics
- Batting average: .233
- Home runs: 11
- Runs batted in: 86
- Stats at Baseball Reference

Teams
- Los Angeles Angels of Anaheim (2010–2013); Detroit Tigers (2014–2017); Seattle Mariners (2018); Texas Rangers (2020); Chicago Cubs (2021)

Andrew James Romine (born December 24, 1985) is an American former professional baseball utility player. He played in Major League Baseball (MLB) for the Los Angeles Angels, Detroit Tigers, Seattle Mariners, Texas Rangers, and Chicago Cubs. He is the brother of MLB catcher Austin Romine and son of former MLB outfielder Kevin Romine. On September 30, 2017, Romine became the fifth player in major league history to play all nine defensive positions in a single game.

== Playing career ==
=== Amateur ===
Romine attended Trabuco Hills High School in Mission Viejo, California. He was drafted by the Philadelphia Phillies in the 36th round of the 2004 Major League Baseball draft, but he opted to attend Arizona State University, where he played for the Arizona State Sun Devils baseball team. In 2006, he played collegiate summer baseball with the Brewster Whitecaps of the Cape Cod Baseball League. Romine was drafted out of Arizona State by the Los Angeles Angels of Anaheim in the fifth round of the 2007 Major League Baseball draft.

=== Los Angeles Angels of Anaheim ===
In 2008 he led the entire Angels organization and the Midwest League with 62 stolen bases. In 2010 he was named to the Texas League All Star Team. Romine was promoted to the Angels on September 24, 2010, making his major league debut that day. He played four games with the Angels during the rest of the season, batting 1-for-11 (.091) and getting his first major league hit on September 26.

Romine was called up to the majors again on June 12, 2011, after an injury sidelined Alberto Callaspo. Romine saw action in 10 games with the Angels and batted .125 with a stolen base. During the 2012 season, Romine appeared in 12 games with the Angels. He posted a .412 batting average (7-for-17) and tallied his first career RBI and a stolen base.

In 2013, Romine saw increased playing time with the Angels, playing in 47 games. He averaged .259/.308/.287 in 108 at-bats, with 10 RBIs and three doubles, his first big league extra-base hits, and one stolen base.

=== Detroit Tigers ===
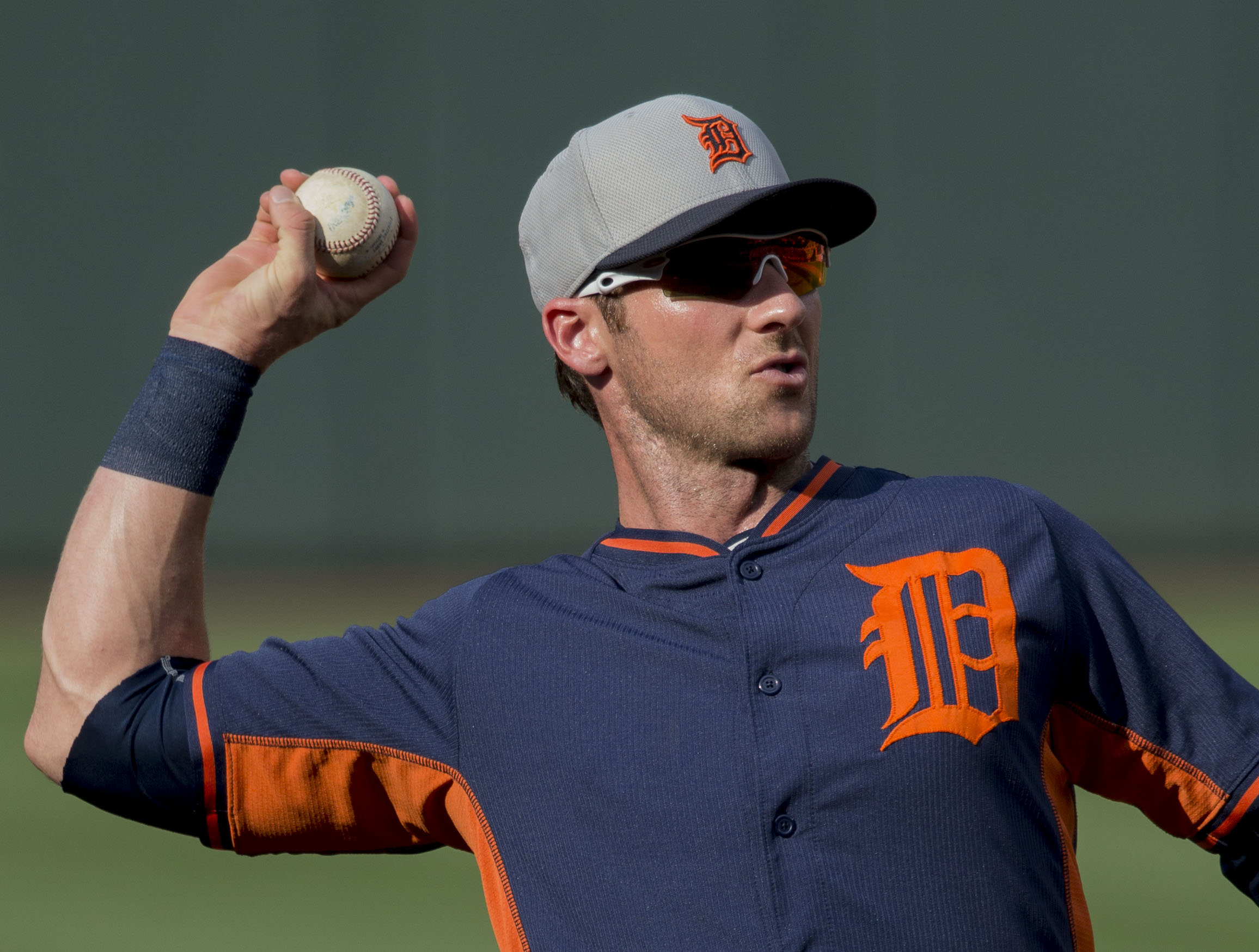
Romine in 2015

On March 21, 2014, Romine was traded to the Detroit Tigers in exchange for left-handed pitcher José Álvarez. On May 23, Romine hit his first major-league career home run, in a game against the Texas Rangers. On August 22, Romine made his first major league pitching appearance, in the eighth inning of a 20–6 loss to the Minnesota Twins. Romine allowed three runs on four hits, including back-to-back home runs. In 251 at-bats, Romine hit .227/.279/.275 on the season, with two home runs and 12 RBIs, while stealing 12 bases in 14 attempts.

On April 29, 2015, Romine made just his second start of the season and went 4-for-4 in a game against the Twins. It was his first career four-hit game. Romine appeared in a then-career-high 109 games for Detroit in 2015, though many of his appearances were as a late-inning defensive replacement or pinch runner. He batted .255/.307/.315 with 2 home runs and 15 RBIs in 184 at-bats, and had 10 stolen bases.

On January 14, 2016, the Tigers avoided arbitration with Romine, agreeing on a one-year, $900,000 contract.

On June 18, Romine pitched 2/3 of an inning in the 9th inning of a 16–5 loss to the Kansas City Royals. He allowed no hits, walked two batters, and was not charged with a run. Following the demotion of Anthony Gose and an injury to Cameron Maybin, the Tigers began using Romine in center field for the first time in his career. He made 13 starts and appeared in 22 total games at the position in 2016. Romine hit .236/.304/.322 with two home runs and 16 RBIs in 174 at-bats during the 2016 season, and was 8-for-8 in stolen bases. He played eight different positions during the season, with 44 games at third base, 22 games in center field, 20 games at first base, 14 games at shortstop, 12 games at second base, two games at right field, one game at left field and one game at pitcher. Following the season, Romine received the Bill McAdam 10th Man Award, as voted by the Detroit Baseball Society.

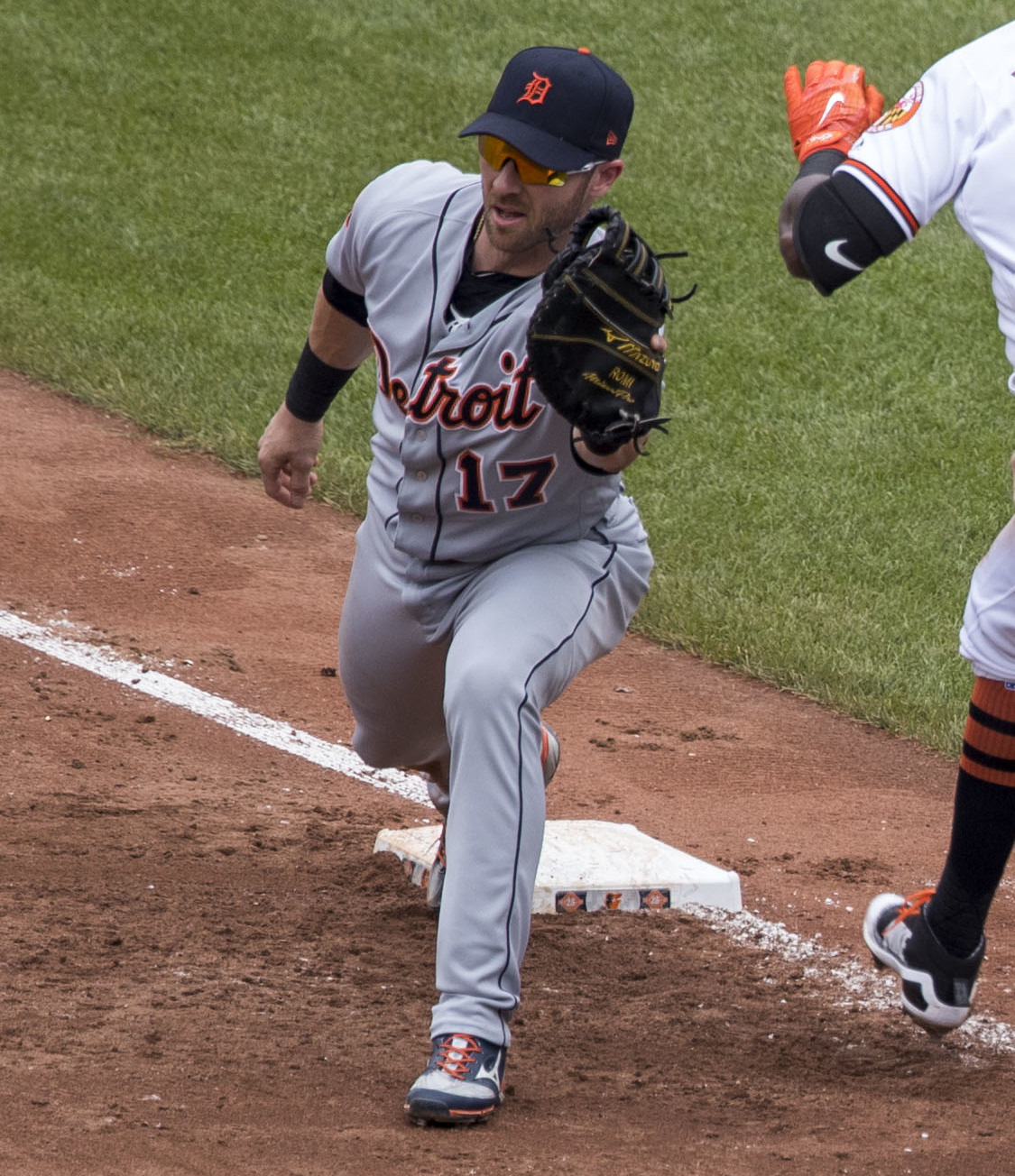
Romine playing first base for the Detroit Tigers in 2017

On January 13, 2017, the Tigers avoided arbitration with Romine, agreeing on a one-year, $1.3 million contract. Romine hit his first career major-league grand slam on April 12 in a 5–3 win against the Twins.

On September 30, Romine became the fifth player in major-league history to play all nine positions in a single game, and the first player to do so since Shane Halter in 2000. During the 2017 season, Romine set career highs in games (124) and at-bats (318), hitting .233/.289/.336 for the year with 17 doubles, four home runs and 25 RBIs. During the season, he played second base (27 games, 17 starts), center field (24 games, 20 starts), third base (23 games, five starts), first base (22 games, four starts), left field (18 games, 15 starts), right field (11 games, nine starts), shortstop (10 games, nine starts), pitcher (two games), and catcher (one game).

=== Seattle Mariners ===
On November 2, 2017, Romine was claimed off waivers by the Seattle Mariners. In 2018 with Seattle he batted .210/.260/.244 with two RBI and one stolen base in 119 at bats, while playing every position but catcher. He elected free agency on October 29, 2018.

=== Philadelphia Phillies ===
On January 11, 2019, Romine signed a minor league deal with the Philadelphia Phillies. Prior to the season, he exercised an opt-out clause in his contract and was released by the Phillies on March 23. However, two days later, he re-signed with the Phillies on a new minor league contract. In 2019 with the Triple–A Lehigh Valley IronPigs, he batted .289./342/.408 with eight home runs, 53 RBI, and 21 stolen bases (4th in the International League) in 380 at-bats. Romine elected free agency following the season on November 4.

=== Chicago White Sox ===
On January 21, 2020, Romine signed a minor league contract with the Chicago White Sox. He was released on July 23.

=== Texas Rangers ===
On September 15, 2020, Romine signed a minor league contract with the Texas Rangers organization. On September 24, Romine was selected to the 40-man and active rosters. Romine played in two games in 2020, hitting a double in four at-bats.

=== Minnesota Twins ===
On February 22, 2021, Romine signed a minor league contract with the Minnesota Twins organization that included an invitation to spring training. On March 25, Romine opted out of his minor league contract and became a free agent.

=== Chicago Cubs ===
On March 29, 2021, Romine signed a minor league contract with the Chicago Cubs organization. On July 30, Romine had his contract selected by the Cubs.

On August 12, Romine started a game against the Milwaukee Brewers at shortstop, but in the 9th inning of a blowout loss was called upon to pitch. His brother Austin, who was also playing for the Cubs and was reinstated that day from the injured list, entered the game as a pinch hitter and took over at catcher. This created an all-Romine brother battery for the Cubs. The Romine brothers had been on opposing teams before at the major league level but had never played in the same game as each other, either on the same team or opposing teams. After hitting .183/.234/.267 with one home run and five RBI in 26 games, Romine was designated for assignment by the Cubs on September 6. He was outrighted to the Triple-A Iowa Cubs two days later.

On December 11, Romine announced his retirement.

== Coaching career ==
In 2024, Romine was hired as the bench coach for the Arizona Complex League Guardians, the rookie-level affiliate of the Cleveland Guardians.

On February 5, 2025, Romine was hired as part of the Milwaukee Brewers' player development staff under the role of infielder coordinator.

== Personal life ==
Romine's father, Kevin Romine, was a utility outfielder for the Boston Red Sox for his entire career (1985–1991), and his younger brother, Austin Romine, is a major league catcher, who is currently a free agent.

== See also ==
- List of second-generation Major League Baseball players
