= Bosser =

Bosser is a surname. It derives from bosser, a Breton word meaning "butcher". Notable people with the surname include:

- Jean Marie Bosser (1922–2013), French botanist
- Jean-Pierre Bosser (born 1959), French army general
- Jean-Pierre Bosser (born 1960), French former footballer
- Mel Bosser (1914–1986), American baseball player
