= George Mitchell (baseball) =

American baseball player (1900–1953)

- Pitcher
- Born: March 31, 1900; Sparta, Illinois, U.S.
- Died: November, 1953; Sparta, Illinois, U.S.
- Batted: Right Threw: Right

Negro league baseball debut
- 1924, for the St. Louis Stars

Last appearance
- 1941, for the St. Louis–New Orleans Stars
- Managerial record at Baseball Reference

Teams
- As player: St. Louis Stars (1924); Chicago American Giants (1925); Indianapolis ABCs (1925–1926); Kansas City Monarchs (1927); Detroit Stars (1928–1929); Chicago American Giants (1930); Indianapolis ABCs (1931, 1933); Cleveland Stars (1932); Indianapolis ABCs/St. Louis–New Orleans Stars (1938, 1941); As manager: Indianapolis ABCs/St. Louis–New Orleans Stars (1938–1941)

George Fredrick Mitchell (March 31, 1900 – November, 1953) was an American Negro league pitcher in the 1920s.

A native of Sparta, Illinois, Mitchell was the twin brother of fellow Negro leaguer Robert Mitchell. He made his Negro leagues debut in 1924 for the St. Louis Stars, where he was a batterymate of catching brother Robert. Mitchell went on to play for several teams through the 1930s, and later managed the Indianapolis ABCs and St. Louis–New Orleans Stars. He died in Sparta in 1953 at age 53.
