= Frank Duncan (pitcher) =

American baseball player (1920-1999)

Frank Duncan III
- Pitcher
- Born: June 1, 1920; Kansas City, Missouri, U.S.
- Died: October 2, 1999 (aged 79); Detroit, Michigan, U.S.
- Batted: Right Threw: Right

Negro league baseball debut
- 1941, for the Kansas City Monarchs

Last appearance
- 1945, for the Baltimore Elite Giants

Teams
- Kansas City Monarchs (1941); Baltimore Elite Giants (1945)

Frank Lee Duncan III (June 1, 1920 – October 2, 1999) was an American Negro league pitcher in the 1940s.

A native of Kansas City, Missouri, Duncan was the son of fellow Negro leaguer Frank Lee Duncan Jr and his wife, jazz musician Julia Lee. He played for the Kansas City Monarchs in 1941, served in the US Army during World War II, and returned to play for the Baltimore Elite Giants in 1945. Duncan played alongside his father with the Monarchs in 1941, and they are thought to have been the first father-son battery in major league history. He died in Detroit, Michigan in 1999 at age 79.
