= Robert Mitchell (baseball) =

American baseball player (1900-1971)

- Catcher
- Born: March 31, 1900; Sparta, Illinois, U.S.
- Died: May, 1971; St. Louis, Missouri, U.S.
- Batted: Right Threw: Right

Negro league baseball debut
- 1923, for the Birmingham Black Barons

Last appearance
- 1924, for the St. Louis Stars

Teams
- Birmingham Black Barons (1923); St. Louis Stars (1924)

Robert Shedrick Mitchell (March 31, 1900 – May, 1971), nicknamed "Pud", was an American Negro league catcher in the 1920s.

A native of Sparta, Illinois, Mitchell was the twin brother of fellow Negro leaguer George Mitchell. He made his Negro leagues debut in 1923 for the Birmingham Black Barons. The following season, he was a batterymate of pitching brother George with the St. Louis Stars. Mitchell died in St. Louis, Missouri in 1971 at age 71.
