= Frank Dasso =

American baseball player (1917–2009)

- Pitcher
- Born: August 31, 1917; Chicago, Illinois, U.S.
- Died: June 8, 2009 (aged 91); Seattle, Washington, U.S.
- Batted: Right Threw: Right

MLB debut
- April 22, 1945, for the Cincinnati Reds

Last MLB appearance
- June 6, 1946, for the Cincinnati Reds

MLB statistics
- Win–loss record: 4–5
- Earned run average: 3.91
- Strikeouts: 40
- Stats at Baseball Reference

Teams
- Cincinnati Reds (1945–1946)

Frank Joseph Nicholas Dasso (August 31, 1917 – June 8, 2009) was an American pitcher in Major League Baseball who played for the Cincinnati Reds during the 1945 and 1946 seasons.

== Early life ==
Dasso was born on August 31, 1917, in Chicago, Illinois. He was sent to a Roman Catholic orphanage for boys when he was six years old, where a nun named Mary Rouck first got him involved in tossing around the baseball. He attended Chicago's Lane Technical College Prep High School, where he never lost a game during his four years there as the team's starting pitcher. Dasso led Lane High to the Chicago high school championship, throwing 10 strikeouts and hitting a single and triple, as he led the team to a 4–2 win over Austin High School.

== Working towards the Majors ==
He was signed by the Boston Red Sox in 1936, and had fellow-rookie Ted Williams as his roommate when he arrived in Boston. In 1936, Dasso played in the Red Sox organization for the Canton Terriers of the Class C Middle Atlantic League, finishing with a 4–7 record in 16 games and an Earned run average (ERA) of 3.86. He was promoted in 1937 to the Class B Rocky Mount Red Sox of the Piedmont League, where he had a 10–12 record and an ERA of 4.48 in 40 games. He pitched for the Class A Hazelton Red Sox of the Eastern League in 1938, with a record of 13–14 in 38 games and an ERA of 3.89. Dasso led the Eastern League that season, with 179 strikeouts in 243 innings of work.

He started the 1939 season in the Eastern League with the Scranton Red Sox, and had a 4–3 record and an ERA of 2.91 in 12 games. While pitching for the Little Rock Travelers of the Southern Association later that season, Dasso threw a perfect game against the Memphis Chicks on April 21, 1939. The Travelers won the game 7–0, with the only Chicks reaching base on a walk and two errors. With Little Rock, Dasso had a record of 4–7 in 27 games, to go along with an ERA of 4.86.

The Red Sox sent Dasso to the San Francisco Seals as part of the deal in which the Red Sox acquired outfielder Dom DiMaggio.

For the 1940 season, Dasso headed west to begin what turned out to be a 10-season long stretch with four different California-based teams in the Pacific Coast League, playing five seasons before his brief major league career and another five seasons in the PCL after it ended. With the San Francisco Seals in 1940, Dasso had a 10–15 record and an ERA of 3.31. He played for the Hollywood Stars in 1942, with a 15–15 record for the season in 43 games and an ERA of 3.91. He spent the 1942 through 1944 seasons pitching for the San Diego Padres (no connection to the major league team of the same name) and had records of 15–18, 12–8 and 20–19 in the three seasons and ERAs each year of around 2.80.

== Major leagues ==
The Cincinnati Reds bought his rights from the Padres, after Dasso led the Pacific Coast League in strikeouts for the 1944 season.

Dasso first played at the major league level on April 22, 1945. Dasso appeared in 18 games for the Reds during his career. He started 12 games for the Reds in 1945 compiling a record of 4–5, and made two appearances in 1946.

== After the majors ==
With the Hollywood Stars in 1946, Dasso had a 12–5 record and a 3.27 ERA in 26 games. He split the 1947 season between Hollywood and the Sacramento Solons, finishing the combined season with the teams with a record of 9–18 and an ERA of 4.69. He appeared in only six games with the Solons in 1948, losing his only decision and ending with an ERA of 7.00. He came back in 1949 at Sacramento and had a 17–10 record with an ERA of 3.74 in 38 games. On the 1949 Solons, Dasso was part of a rotation that included Bob Gillespie, Orval Grove and Ken Holcombe, described by John B. Old of Sporting News as "the best any Coast League club ever had." His final season at Sacramento was in 1950, where he declined to a 4–9 season record in 31 games and a 5.49 ERA.

As general manager of the Wenatchee Chiefs, Dasso organized a promotion in July 1953 called "Bust Down the Fences Night" in a game against the Tri-City Braves, in which attendees at the game were told that you could "pay what you like; no regular admission". Gate receipts from the 3,200 in attendance at the game was $1,251, an average of 40 cents per fan, earning the team more in profit from that one game than any three games they had played in that season to-date.

== Personal ==
Dasso came to Wenatchee, Washington in 1952 as a player, and later as a coach and general manager, with the Wenatchee Chiefs, and settled there with his family after retiring from baseball. He later worked for as an Allstate Insurance agent and as a property manager for a bank, retiring when he was 85 years old.

Dasso died at age 91, on June 8, 2009, in Seattle, Washington. His wife, the former Ethel Gretz, had died in 1997; The two were married in 1939. He was survived by a daughter and three sons.
