= George Burpo =

American baseball player (1922–2015)

- Pitcher
- Born: June 19, 1922; Jenkins, Kentucky, U.S.
- Died: December 20, 2015 (aged 93); Tucson, Arizona, U.S.
- Batted: Right Threw: Left

MLB debut
- June 9, 1946, for the Cincinnati Reds

Last MLB appearance
- July 3, 1946, for the Cincinnati Reds

MLB statistics
- Win–loss record: 0–0
- Earned run average: 15.43
- Strikeouts: 1
- Stats at Baseball Reference

Teams
- Cincinnati Reds (1946)

George Harvie Burpo (June 19, 1922 – December 20, 2015) was an American professional baseball player. He was a left-handed pitcher who made two appearances in 1946 for the Cincinnati Reds. For his career, he did not record a decision, with a 15.43 earned run average and one strikeout in 2 1/3 innings pitched.

== Early life and education ==
Burpo served three years in the United States Navy at Naval Air Technical Training Center, Norman, Oklahoma during the World War II and received an honorable discharge in December 1945.
