= Austin Romine =

American baseball player (born 1988)

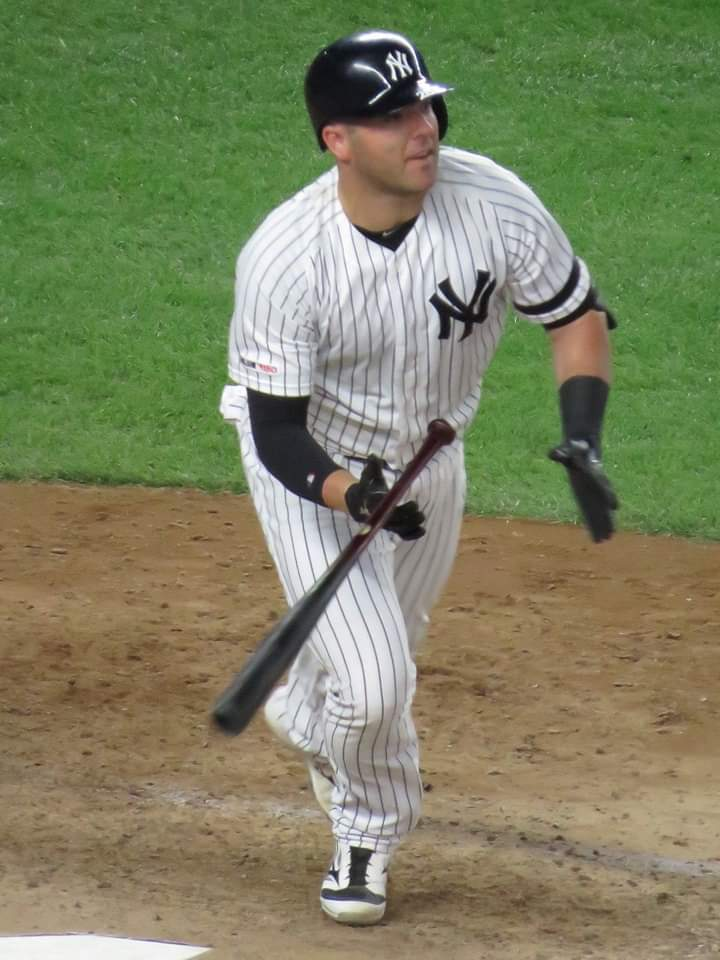
- Romine with the New York Yankees
- Catcher
- Born: November 22, 1988 (age 37); Lake Forest, California, U.S.
- Batted: Right Threw: Right

MLB debut
- September 11, 2011, for the New York Yankees

Last MLB appearance
- October 5, 2022, for the Cincinnati Reds

MLB statistics
- Batting average: .230
- Home runs: 31
- Runs batted in: 166
- Stats at Baseball Reference

Teams
- New York Yankees (2011, 2013–2019); Detroit Tigers (2020); Chicago Cubs (2021); Los Angeles Angels (2022); St. Louis Cardinals (2022); Cincinnati Reds (2022)

Austin Allen Romine (born November 22, 1988) is an American former professional baseball catcher. He has previously played in Major League Baseball (MLB) for the New York Yankees, Detroit Tigers, Chicago Cubs, Los Angeles Angels, St. Louis Cardinals, and Cincinnati Reds. He made his MLB debut in 2011 for the Yankees. He is the son of Kevin Romine and the brother of Andrew Romine.

== Career ==
=== Early career ===
Romine attended El Toro High School in Lake Forest, California, where he played on the school's baseball team with fellow future major leaguer Nolan Arenado. He was drafted by the Yankees in the second round of the 2007 Major League Baseball draft.

Going into the 2009 season, he was rated the Yankees' fourth-best prospect and their second-best prospect for 2010, according to Baseball America. In 2009, Romine was named the Florida State League Player of the Year. In 2010, he participated in the All-Star Futures Game.

After competing for the major league backup catcher job in spring training, Romine was assigned to the Double-A Trenton Thunder to begin the 2011 season. The Yankees promoted Romine to the Triple-A Scranton/Wilkes-Barre Yankees on September 1.

=== New York Yankees ===
After injuries to two catchers, first to Russell Martin and then Francisco Cervelli, the Yankees promoted Romine to the major leagues on September 10. In the seventh inning of the September 11 game against the Angels, Romine made his major league debut behind the plate. On September 12, he got his first Major League hit off Seattle Mariners reliever Dan Cortes.

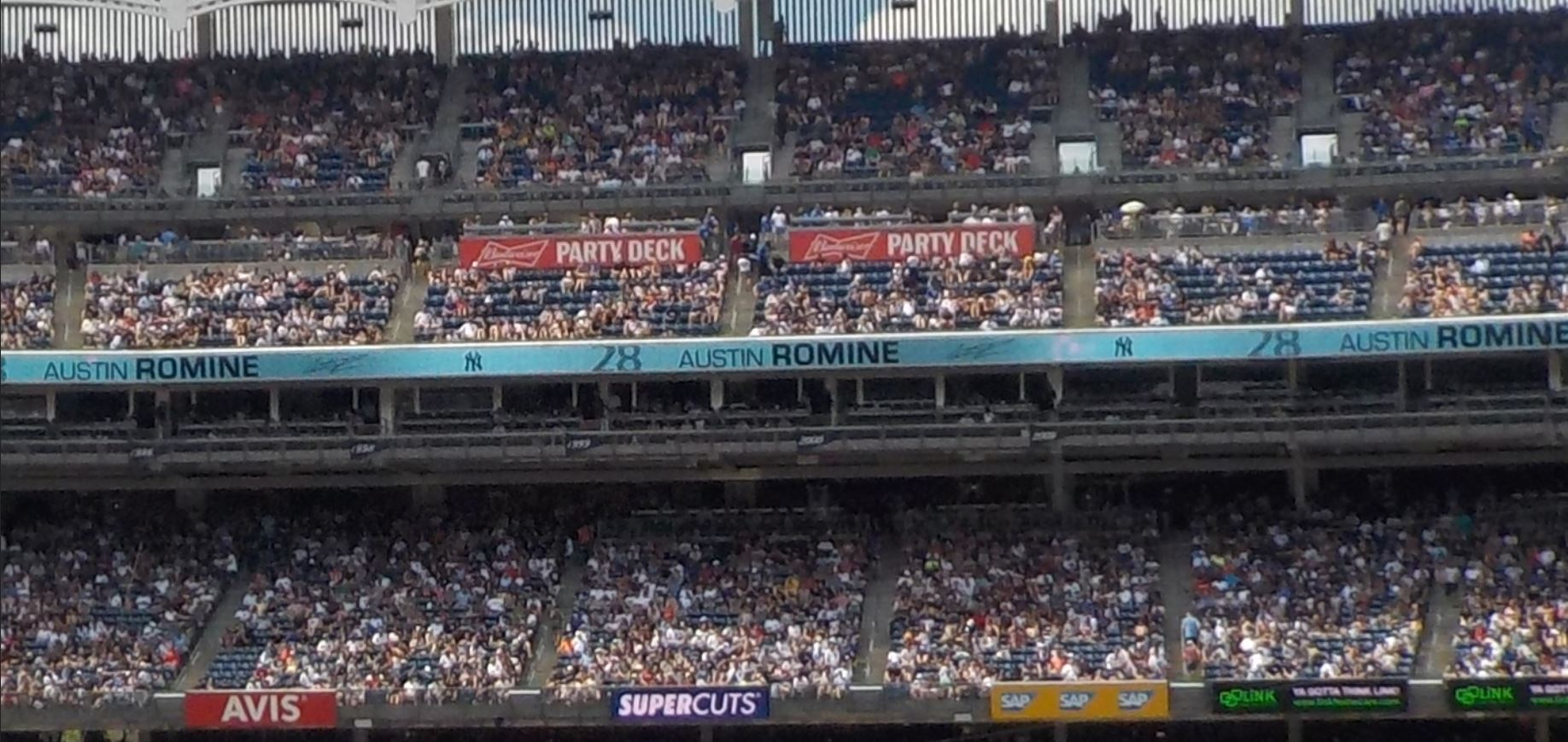
Austin Romine's name is shown on the Yankee Stadium scoreboard as he is announced as the next batter

Romine missed most of the 2012 season with two bulging discs in his back. When Cervelli suffered a broken hand on April 26, 2013, the Yankees promoted him to the major leagues. On August 4, Romine hit the first home run of his Major League career off San Diego Padres pitcher Dale Thayer. He suffered a concussion on September 10, when he was hit in the mask by a foul ball. He batted .207 for the season.

Romine competed with Cervelli and John Ryan Murphy to be the backup catcher for the Yankees in 2014 spring training, Cervelli won the job, and Romine was optioned to the minor leagues. Romine was called up several times during the 2014 season due to injuries to various players, but only appeared in seven games.

Romine was designated for assignment on April 4, 2015, and was outrighted from the 40-man roster and assigned to Scranton/Wilkes Barre on April 8. Romine batted .260 with seven home runs for the RailRiders in 2015. The Yankees promoted Romine to the major leagues on September 1. During spring training in 2016, Romine won the backup catcher competition over top catching prospect Gary Sánchez. In 2016 as the Yankees' backup catcher, Romine played in 62 games hitting .242 with 4 home runs and 26 RBI.

In 2017, Romine began the season as the backup to Gary Sánchez, but after an injury to Sánchez on April 8, Romine became the Yankees starting catcher until Sanchez returned at the start of May. On August 24, Romine got into an altercation with Miguel Cabrera at home plate. Cabrera shoved Romine, triggering a bench-clearing brawl, and both combatants were ejected. The next day, on August 25, Romine was suspended for two games, pending an appeal. On September 8, Romine dropped his appeal, and began serving his suspension, which was reduced to one game. He batted .218 for the season. He had the lowest batting average against left-handers among all MLB hitters (60 or more plate appearances), at .143.

Romine became the primary catcher for the Yankees after Gary Sánchez was injured in June 2018, and again re-injured in July. He was expected to serve in this role until Sánchez's return. On July 24, Romine was announced as the Yankees' "Heart and Hustle" award winner.

On October 8, Romine pitched in the top of the ninth inning in a 16–1 loss to the Boston Red Sox in Game 3 of the 2018 American League Division Series, becoming only the second position player to ever pitch in the postseason, the first since Toronto Blue Jays infielder Cliff Pennington in the 2015 American League Championship Series against the Kansas City Royals. Romine allowed two runs in the inning by allowing a two-run home run to Brock Holt which made Holt become the first player to hit for the cycle in an MLB postseason game.

On April 21, Romine hit his first career walk-off hit, an RBI single in a 7-6 win over the Kansas City Royals. On July 25, Romine made his first career pitching appearance in the regular season, pitching in the bottom of the eighth inning in a 19-3 loss to the Boston Red Sox, who he pitched against in Game 3 of the 2018 ALDS. Romine gave up three runs on four hits, including a double and two homers.

=== Detroit Tigers ===
On December 13, 2019, Romine signed a one-year, $4.15 million contract with the Detroit Tigers.

On July 24, 2020, Romine made his Tigers debut as an Opening Day starting catcher. Overall with the 2020 Detroit Tigers, Romine batted .238 with two home runs and 17 RBIs in 37 games.

=== Chicago Cubs ===
On January 23, 2021, Romine signed a one-year, $1.5 million contract with the Chicago Cubs. On May 5, 2021, Romine was placed on the 60-day injured list with a left wrist sprain.

On August 12, 2021, Romine was activated from the injured list by the Cubs and entered the game as a pinch hitter and took over catching duties in a blowout loss to the Milwaukee Brewers. In the top of the 9th inning, Romine's brother Andrew, a utility infielder with the Cubs, moved from the shortstop position to pitcher, making it an all-Romine battery. The Romine brothers had been on opposing major league teams, but had never appeared together with the Cubs or played in the same game at the major league level. Romine became a free agent on October 5, 2021.

=== Los Angeles Angels ===
On March 15, 2022, Romine signed a minor league contract with the Los Angeles Angels. On May 10, Romine had his contract selected to the active roster after Max Stassi and Kurt Suzuki were placed on the COVID-19 injured list. He appeared in 3 games, going 2-for-8 before he was removed from the 40-man roster and returned to Triple-A on May 21. He was released on June 1, 2022.

=== St. Louis Cardinals ===
On June 17, 2022, Romine signed a minor league contract with the St. Louis Cardinals. He was assigned to the Triple-A Memphis Redbirds.

Romine was selected to the 40-man roster and called up by the Cardinals on July 4, 2022. On July 24, it was announced that Romine, along with teammates Paul Goldschmidt and Nolan Arenado, would not be allowed to travel with the Cardinals to Toronto for a scheduled series against the Blue Jays, due to his lack of a COVID-19 vaccination. Romine was designated for assignment by St. Louis on August 2. In 11 games for the team, he went 4-for-26 with 2 walks and no home runs or RBI.

=== Cincinnati Reds ===
On August 2, 2022, Romine was traded to the Cincinnati Reds in exchange for cash considerations. He appeared in 37 games for Cincinnati down the stretch, hitting .147/.173/.263 with 3 home runs and 9 RBI.

On December 27, 2022, Romine re-signed with the Reds on a minor league contract that included an invitation to spring training. After going 3-for-15 with a home run during the spring, Romine was released by Cincinnati on March 18, 2023.

== Personal life ==
Romine's father, Kevin, played in the majors for the Boston Red Sox from 1985 to 1991. His brother, Andrew, is also a former major league player. Romine and his wife Alexzandria had their first child, a son, born in 2013.

== See also ==
- List of second-generation Major League Baseball players
