= Ray Medeiros =

American baseball player (1926–2003)

- Pinch runner
- Born: May 9, 1926; Oakland, California, U.S.
- Died: June 6, 2003 (aged 77); San Mateo, California, U.S.
- Batted: Right Threw: Right

MLB debut
- April 25, 1945, for the Cincinnati Reds

Last MLB appearance
- April 25, 1945, for the Cincinnati Reds

MLB statistics
- Games played: 1
- At bats: 0
- Hits: 0
- Stats at Baseball Reference

Teams
- Cincinnati Reds (1945)

Ray Antone Medeiros (May 9, 1926 – June 6, 2003) was an American pinch runner in Major League Baseball. He played for the Cincinnati Reds.
