= Mike Modak =

American baseball player (1922–1995)

- Pitcher
- Born: May 18, 1922; Campbell, Ohio, U.S.
- Died: December 12, 1995 (aged 73); Lakeland, Florida, U.S.
- Batted: Right Threw: Right

MLB debut
- July 4, 1945, for the Cincinnati Reds

Last MLB appearance
- September 29, 1945, for the Cincinnati Reds

MLB statistics
- Win–loss record: 1–2
- Earned run average: 5.74
- Strikeouts: 7
- Stats at Baseball Reference

Teams
- Cincinnati Reds (1945)

Michael Modak (May 18, 1922 – December 12, 1995) was an American pitcher in Major League Baseball. He played for the Cincinnati Reds.
