= Al Libke =

American baseball player (1918–2003)

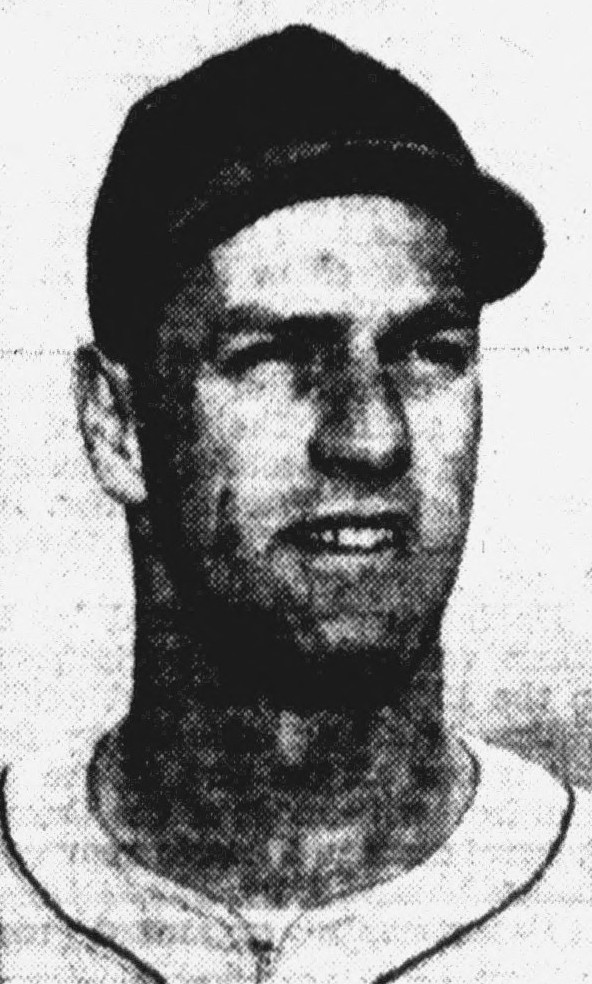
- Libke, circa 1948
- Outfielder
- Born: September 12, 1918; Tacoma, Washington
- Died: March 7, 2003 (aged 84); Wenatchee, Washington
- Batted: Left Threw: Right

MLB debut
- April 19, 1945, for the Cincinnati Reds

Last MLB appearance
- September 29, 1946, for the Cincinnati Reds

MLB statistics
- Batting average: .268
- Home runs: 9
- Strikeouts: 95
- Stats at Baseball Reference

Teams
- Cincinnati Reds (1945–1946)

Albert Walter Libke (September 12, 1918 – March 7, 2003) was an outfielder in Major League Baseball. He played for the Cincinnati Reds.
