= Ray Lamanno =

American baseball player (1919–1994)

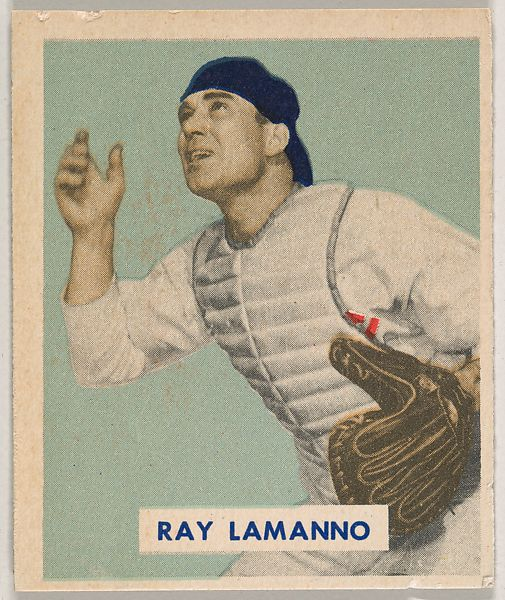
- Catcher
- Born: November 17, 1919; Oakland, California, U.S.
- Died: February 9, 1994 (aged 74); Berkeley, California, U.S.
- Batted: Right Threw: Right

MLB debut
- September 11, 1941, for the Cincinnati Reds

Last MLB appearance
- October 1, 1948, for the Cincinnati Reds

MLB statistics
- Batting average: .252
- Home runs: 18
- Runs batted in: 150
- Stats at Baseball Reference

Teams
- Cincinnati Reds (1941–1942, 1946–1948)

Career highlights and awards
- All-Star (1946)

Raymond Simon Lamanno (November 17, 1919 – February 9, 1994) was an American professional baseball player. A catcher, he appeared in 442 games played in the Major Leagues for the Cincinnati Reds (1941–1942; 1946–1948). The native of Oakland, California, stood 6 feet (1.8 m) tall and weighed 185 pounds (84 kg). He threw and batted right-handed.

Lamanno's career was interrupted by World War II service in the United States Navy in the Pacific Theater of Operations.

In 1946, Lamanno was selected as a National League All-Star. He appeared in the game, at Fenway Park and won 12–0 by the American League, as a pinch hitter and grounded out against Jack Kramer of the St. Louis Browns. The following season, Lamanno caught Ewell Blackwell's no-hitter on June 18, 1947.
