= Mel Bosser =

American baseball player (1914–1986)

- Pitcher
- Born: February 8, 1914; Johnstown, Pennsylvania, U.S.
- Died: March 26, 1986 (aged 72); Crossville, Tennessee, U.S.
- Batted: Right Threw: Right

MLB debut
- April 29, 1945, for the Cincinnati Reds

Last MLB appearance
- June 9, 1945, for the Cincinnati Reds

MLB statistics
- Win–loss record: 2–0
- Earned run average: 3.38
- Strikeouts: 3
- Stats at Baseball Reference

Teams
- Cincinnati Reds (1945)

Melvin Edward Bosser (February 8, 1914 – March 26, 1986) was an American Major League Baseball (MLB) pitcher who played for the Cincinnati Reds in 1945. The 31-year-old rookie right-hander was a native of Johnstown, Pennsylvania.

Bosser is one of many ballplayers who only appeared in the major leagues during World War II. He made his major league debut in relief on April 29, 1945, in a doubleheader against the St. Louis Cardinals at Crosley Field. Fifteen days later he made his first big league start and was the winning pitcher in a 5–4 game against the Philadelphia Phillies at Shibe Park. His next win came in relief on May 30, also against the Phillies. His last appearance was on June 9, and then he was released by the Reds the next day.

In a total of 7 games he was 2–0 with 2 games started, 0 complete games, and 3 games finished. In 16 innings pitched he gave up 9 hits and walked 17. However, he allowed only 6 earned runs, so his final ERA was 3.38.

Bosser died at the age of 72 in Crossville, Tennessee. He was interred in the Crossville City Cemetery in Crossville, Tennessee.
