= Elmer Riddle =

American baseball player (1914–1984)

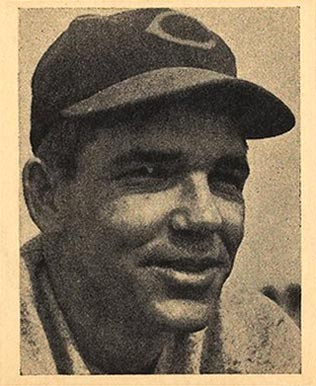
- Pitcher
- Born: July 31, 1914; Columbus, Georgia, U.S.
- Died: May 14, 1984 (aged 69); Columbus, Georgia, U.S.
- Batted: Right Threw: Right

MLB debut
- October 1, 1939, for the Cincinnati Reds

Last MLB appearance
- August 3, 1949, for the Pittsburgh Pirates

MLB statistics
- Win–loss record: 65–52
- Earned run average: 3.40
- Strikeouts: 342
- Stats at Baseball Reference

Teams
- Cincinnati Reds (1939–1945, 1947); Pittsburgh Pirates (1948–1949)

Career highlights and awards
- All-Star (1948); World Series champion (1940); NL wins leader (1943); NL ERA leader (1941)

Elmer Ray Riddle (July 31, 1914 – May 14, 1984) was an American professional baseball player. A right-handed pitcher, he appeared in all or parts of ten Major League Baseball (MLB) seasons (1939–45; 1947–49) for the Cincinnati Reds and Pittsburgh Pirates. As a member of the 1941 Reds, he led the National League (NL) in winning percentage (19–4, .826) and earned run average (ERA) (2.24). Two years later, he tied for the NL and MLB lead in games won, with 21.

The 5 ft 11 in (1.80 m), 170 lb (77 kg) Riddle was born in Columbus, Georgia, the younger brother (by almost nine years) of Johnny Riddle, who had a brief career as a catcher and a longer tenure as a coach in the big leagues. Elmer Riddle's career started in 1936 and after four seasons in minor league baseball and a one-game 1939 trial with Cincinnati, he made the Reds' roster in 1940. He appeared in 15 games, all but one in relief, as the Reds won their second consecutive National League pennant. Riddle worked one inning of relief during the 1940 World Series against the Detroit Tigers, pitching a scoreless ninth in Game 1 and notching two strikeouts. The Reds lost that game, but took the series in seven games.

Riddle began 1941 in the Reds' bullpen, but on June 15 he was given a starting assignment against the New York Giants, and hurled a complete game victory. It was the first of seven straight complete game wins, including two shutouts. The day the skein ended, July 23 against the Brooklyn Dodgers, Riddle had an unblemished 11–0 won-lost record and a sterling 2.14 ERA. Riddle went on to win eight of his final 12 decisions, and, although the Reds fell to third in the standings, he ranked fifth in the polling for the 1941 National League Most Valuable Player Award. After a disappointing 1942 season, Riddle bounced back in 1943 by winning 21 of 32 decisions for Cincinnati, tying him with Rip Sewell and Mort Cooper for the most victories in the Majors.

However, a sore shoulder, eventually requiring surgery, interrupted Riddle's successful career. He appeared in only 32 games from 1944–47, and sat out the entire 1946 season. In December 1947, Cincinnati sold his contract to the Pirates, where he made a comeback in 1948. As the Pirates climbed to fourth place in the National League, Riddle appeared in 28 games, won 12 of 22 decisions, posted 12 complete games and three shutouts, and was selected to the 1948 NL All-Star team. He did not appear in the contest, won by the American League, 5–2, at Sportsman's Park, St. Louis. An injury limited his effectiveness in 1949, however, and in August Riddle was sent to the minor leagues, where he finished his 15-year pro career in 1951.

For his MLB career, Riddle appeared in 190 games, compiling a 65–52 career record and 3.40 ERA in 1,023 innings pitched, with 342 strikeouts, 57 complete games and 13 shutouts. He allowed 974 hits and 458 bases on balls.

Riddle is widely regarded to have been a very good hitting pitcher in his 10-year major league career, posting a .204 batting average (69-for-339) with 30 runs, one home run and 28 runs batted in. He also was considered to have been an excellent fielding pitcher, recording a .987 fielding percentage, with only three errors in 236 total chances covering 190 games.

Riddle died in his hometown, Columbus, at the age of 69.

== See also ==
- List of Major League Baseball annual ERA leaders
- List of Major League Baseball annual wins leaders
