= Eddie Shokes =

American baseball player (1920–2002)

- First baseman
- Born: January 27, 1920; Charleston, South Carolina, U.S.
- Died: September 14, 2002 (aged 82); Winchester, Virginia, U.S.
- Batted: Left Threw: Left

MLB debut
- June 9, 1941, for the Cincinnati Reds

Last MLB appearance
- September 29, 1946, for the Cincinnati Reds

MLB statistics
- Batting average: .119
- Home runs: 0
- Runs batted in: 5
- Stats at Baseball Reference

Teams
- Cincinnati Reds (1941, 1946)

Edward Christopher Shokes (January 27, 1920 – September 14, 2002) was an American left-handed first baseman who played Major League Baseball for the Cincinnati Reds from 1941 to 1946.
