= Benny Zientara =

American baseball player (1918–1985)

- Second baseman
- Born: February 14, 1918; Chicago, Illinois, U.S.
- Died: April 16, 1985 (aged 67); Lake Elsinore, California, U.S.
- Batted: Right Threw: Right

MLB debut
- September 11, 1941, for the Cincinnati Reds

Last MLB appearance
- September 23, 1948, for the Cincinnati Reds

MLB statistics
- Batting average: .254
- Home runs: 2
- Runs batted in: 49
- Stats at Baseball Reference

Teams
- Cincinnati Reds (1941, 1946–1948)

Benedict Joseph Zientara (February 14, 1918 – April 16, 1985) was an American professional baseball infielder. He played all or part of four seasons in Major League Baseball (1941, 1946–48), playing mainly as a second baseman for the Cincinnati Reds. Listed at 5 ft 9 in (1.75 m), 165 lb., he batted and threw right-handed.

A native of Chicago, Zientara was one of many major leaguers who saw his baseball career interrupted by a military stint during World War II. In parts of four seasons, he was a .254 hitter (230-for-906) with two home runs and 49 RBI in 278 games, including 106 runs, 29 doubles, five triples, and five stolen bases.

Zientara died in 1985 in Lake Elsinore, California, at the age of 67. He was buried at the Riverside National Cemetery in Riverside, California.
