= Johnny Riddle =

American baseball player (1905–1998)

- Catcher
- Born: October 3, 1905; Clinton, South Carolina, U.S.
- Died: December 15, 1998 (aged 93); Indianapolis, Indiana, U.S.
- Batted: Right Threw: Right

MLB debut
- April 17, 1930, for the Chicago White Sox

Last MLB appearance
- September 11, 1948, for the Pittsburgh Pirates

MLB statistics
- Batting average: .238
- Home runs: 0
- Runs batted in: 11
- Stats at Baseball Reference

Teams
- Chicago White Sox (1930); Washington Senators (1937); Boston Bees (1937–1938); Cincinnati Reds (1941, 1944–1945); Pittsburgh Pirates (1948)

John Ludy Riddle (October 3, 1905 – December 15, 1998) was an American professional baseball player and coach. He appeared in 98 games in Major League Baseball as a reserve catcher for the Chicago White Sox (1930), Washington Senators (1937), Boston Bees (1937–38), Cincinnati Reds (1941 and 1944–45) and Pittsburgh Pirates (1948). At the age of 42 in 1948 (as a player-coach), he was the oldest player to appear in a National League game that season. He was the older brother of Elmer Riddle, a star pitcher in the early 1940s as a member of the Reds.

Johnny Riddle was born in Clinton, South Carolina. His playing career was unusual in that not only did he once go seven years between major league appearances, it also took a span of nineteen years to appear in seven major league seasons. In those seven seasons, he got into an average of 14 games per year. Riddle spent 19 years in minor league baseball, including a dozen seasons as a member of the Indianapolis Indians of the top-level American Association.

Riddle made his major league debut on April 17, 1930 (Opening Day) against the Cleveland Indians at Comiskey Park. His last game was September 11, 1948 against the Chicago Cubs at Wrigley Field. In his MLB career he was 51-for-214 (.238) with four doubles, a triple, 11 runs batted in, and 18 runs scored. On defense, he made only five errors and had a fielding percentage of .983.

Riddle spent all or parts of three seasons as a player-manager in minor league baseball (1942–44), and later worked for 101/2 years as a coach in the National League, for the Pirates (1948–50), St. Louis Cardinals (1952–55), Milwaukee Braves (1956–57), Cincinnati Redlegs (1958) and Philadelphia Phillies (1959). He won a World Series championship ring as the first base coach of the Braves in 1957.

Riddle died at the age of 93 in Indianapolis, where he ultimately made his home after his long tenure with the Indians.

== See also ==
- List of St. Louis Cardinals coaches
