= Eddie Lukon =

American baseball player (1920–1996)

- Outfielder
- Born: August 5, 1920; Burgettstown, Pennsylvania, U.S.
- Died: November 7, 1996 (aged 76); Canonsburg, Pennsylvania, U.S.
- Batted: Left Threw: Left

MLB debut
- August 6, 1941, for the Cincinnati Reds

Last MLB appearance
- May 16, 1947, for the Cincinnati Reds

MLB statistics
- Batting average: .236
- Home runs: 23
- Runs batted in: 70
- Stats at Baseball Reference

Teams
- Cincinnati Reds (1941, 1945–47)

Edward Paul Lukon (August 5, 1920 – November 7, 1996) was an American Major League Baseball outfielder. He played all or part of four seasons in the majors, all for the Cincinnati Reds. He played for them in 1941, then returned after a year in the minors and three years serving in World War II to play two games in 1945, then full seasons in 1946 and 1947. Lukon's nickname was "Mongoose".

in 213 games over four seasons, Lukon posted a .236 batting average (143-for-606) with 64 runs, 23 home runs, 70 RBI and 60 bases on balls. He finished his career with a .989 fielding percentage as an outfielder.

== Sources ==
- Career statistics from Baseball Reference · Baseball Reference (Minors) · Retrosheet · Baseball Almanac
