= 1945 St. Louis Browns season =

Major League Baseball season

1945 St. Louis Browns
- League: American League
- Ballpark: Sportsman's Park
- City: St. Louis, Missouri
- Record: 81–70 (.536)
- League place: 3rd
- Owners: Richard Muckerman
- General managers: Bill DeWitt
- Managers: Luke Sewell
- Radio: WIL (Harry Caray, Gabby Street); WTMV (France Laux, Johnny O'Hara)

The 1945 St. Louis Browns season involved the Browns finishing 3rd in the American League with a record of 81 wins and 70 losses.

== Regular season ==
Coming off their first pennant in 1944, St. Louis didn't regress very far but still finished six games off the pace.

=== Season standings ===
American League
Team	W	L	Pct.	GB	Home	Road
Detroit Tigers	88	65	.575	—	50‍–‍26	38‍–‍39
Washington Senators	87	67	.565	1½	46‍–‍31	41‍–‍36
St. Louis Browns	81	70	.536	6	47‍–‍27	34‍–‍43
New York Yankees	81	71	.533	6½	48‍–‍28	33‍–‍43
Cleveland Indians	73	72	.503	11	44‍–‍33	29‍–‍39
Chicago White Sox	71	78	.477	15	44‍–‍29	27‍–‍49
Boston Red Sox	71	83	.461	17½	42‍–‍35	29‍–‍48
Philadelphia Athletics	52	98	.347	34½	39‍–‍35	13‍–‍63

=== Record vs. opponents ===
1945 American League record Sources:
Team	BOS	CWS	CLE	DET	NYY	PHA	SLB	WSH
Boston	—	9–13	11–11	12–10–1	6–16	14–8	8–14–1	11–11–1
Chicago	13–9	—	11–8–1	10–12	9–12	12–10	8–13	8–14
Cleveland	11–11	8–11–1	—	11–11	12–9	12–6–1	11–10	8–14
Detroit	10–12–1	12–10	11–11	—	15–7	15–7–1	15–6	10–12
New York	16–6	12–9	9–12	7–15	—	16–6	7–15	14–8
Philadelphia	8–14	10–12	6–12–1	7–15–1	6–16	—	10–12–1	5–17
St. Louis	14–8–1	13–8	10–11	6–15	15–7	12–10–1	—	11–11–1
Washington	11–11–1	14–8	14–8	12–10	8–14	17–5	11–11–1	—

=== Notable transactions ===
- August 8, 1945: George Caster was selected off waivers from the Browns by the Detroit Tigers.

=== Roster ===
1945 St. Louis Browns
Roster
Pitchers: 36 Pete Appleton; 16 George Caster; 23 Cliff Fannin; 25 Al Hollingsworth; 22 Sig Jakucki; 17,35 Earl Jones; 19 Jack Kramer; 27,31 Al LaMacchia; 36 Ox Miller; 29 Bob Muncrief; 24 Nels Potter; 23 Dee Sanders; 21 Tex Shirley; 20 Lefty West; 26 Sam Zoldak	Catchers: 9 Red Hayworth; 8 Frank Mancuso; 7 Joe Schultz; Infielders: 6 Mark Christman; 2 Ellis Clary; 4 Don Gutteridge; 3 George McQuinn; 1 Len Schulte; 5 Vern Stephens	Outfielders: 11 Milt Byrnes; 10 Frank Demaree; 1,14 Pete Gray; 12 Mike Kreevich; 28 Chet Laabs; -- Babe Martin; 15 Gene Moore	Manager: 32 Luke Sewell; Coaches: 33 Fred Hofmann; 34 Zack Taylor; Jack Tobin

== Player stats ==
=== Batting ===
==== Starters by position ====
Note: G = Games played; AB = At bats; H = Hits; Avg. = Batting average; HR = Home runs; RBI = Runs batted in

⌖	Player	G	AB	H	AVG	HR	RBI
C	Frank Mancuso	119	365	98	.268	1	38
1B	George McQuinn	139	483	134	.277	7	61
2B	Don Gutteridge	143	543	129	.238	2	49
SS	Vern Stephens	149	571	165	.289	24	89
3B	Mark Christman	78	289	80	.277	4	34
OF	Mike Kreevich	84	295	70	.237	2	21
OF	Milt Byrnes	133	442	110	.249	8	59
OF	Gene Moore	110	354	92	.260	5	50

==== Other batters ====
Note: G = Games played; AB = At bats; H = Hits; Avg. = Batting average; HR = Home runs; RBI = Runs batted in

Player	G	AB	H	AVG	HR	RBI
Len Schulte	119	430	106	.247	0	36
Pete Gray	77	234	51	.218	0	13
Lou Finney	57	213	59	.277	2	22
Babe Martin	54	185	37	.200	2	16
Red Hayworth	56	160	31	.194	0	17
Chet Laabs	35	109	26	.239	1	8
Joe Schultz	41	44	13	.295	0	8
Ellis Clary	26	38	8	.211	1	2

=== Pitching ===
==== Starting pitchers ====
Note: G = Games pitched; IP = Innings pitched; W = Wins; L = Losses; ERA = Earned run average; SO = Strikeouts

Player	G	IP	W	L	ERA	SO
Nels Potter	32	255.1	15	11	2.47	129
Jack Kramer	29	193.0	10	15	3.36	99
Sig Jakucki	30	192.1	12	10	3.51	55
Tex Shirley	32	183.2	8	12	3.63	77
Al Hollingsworth	26	173.1	12	9	2.70	64
Ox Miller	4	28.1	2	1	1.59	4
Bob Muncrief	27	145.2	13	4	2.72	54
Lefty West	24	74.1	3	4	3.63	38

==== Relief pitchers ====
Note: G = Games pitched; W = Wins; L = Losses; SV = Saves; ERA = Earned run average; SO = Strikeouts

Player	G	W	L	SV	ERA	SO
Sam Zoldak	26	3	2	0	3.36	19
Earl Jones	10	0	0	1	2.54	13
George Caster	10	1	2	1	6.89	9
Cliff Fannin	5	0	0	0	2.61	5
Al LaMacchia	5	2	0	0	2.00	2
Pete Appleton	2	0	0	0	15.43	1
Dee Sanders	2	0	0	0	40.50	1

== Farm system ==
Level	Team	League	Manager
AA	Toledo Mud Hens	American Association	Ollie Marquardt
A	Elmira Pioneers	Eastern League	Jimmy Adair
D	Newark Moundsmen	Ohio State League	Mickey O'Neil

== Awards and honors ==
=== League top five finishers ===
Nels Potter

- #2 in AL in strikeouts (129)

Vern Stephens

- Led AL in home runs (24)
- #2 in AL in runs scored (90)
- #2 in AL in slugging percentage (.473)
- #3 in AL in RBI (89)
