= 1944 St. Louis Browns season =

Major League Baseball season

1944 St. Louis Browns
- American League champions
- League: American League
- Ballpark: Sportsman's Park
- City: St. Louis, Missouri
- Record: 89–65 (.578)
- League place: 1st
- Owners: Donald Lee Barnes
- General managers: Bill DeWitt
- Managers: Luke Sewell
- Radio: WEW/WTMV (Dizzy Dean, Johnny O'Hara)

The 1944 St. Louis Browns season was a season in American baseball. It involved the Browns finishing first in the American League with a record of 89 wins and 65 losses. This resulted in the franchise appearing in the postseason for the first time in team history, as well as appearing in their first ever World Series. In the World Series, they lost to the team they shared a stadium with, the Cardinals, four games to two. It was the only time the franchise made the playoffs while based in St. Louis. They didn't go back to the postseason until 1966, by which time they had relocated to Baltimore.

== Offseason ==
- February 17, 1944: Frankie Hayes was traded by the Browns to the Philadelphia Athletics for Sam Zoldak and Barney Lutz (minors).
- Prior to 1944 season: Owen Friend was signed as an amateur free agent by the Browns.

== Regular season ==
The Browns were one of the unlikeliest pennant-winners in history, failing to contend in nine of the previous 10 seasons.

However, 1944 marked the peak of wartime conditions in Major League Baseball. The shortage of available players degraded the talent level of both major leagues, benefiting the 1944 Browns who were relatively untouched by the military draft. Nine players were at least 34 years old and the all-4F infield included 23-year-old shortstop Vern Stephens, who led the league in RBI (109) and was second in home runs (20).

St. Louis started the season with nine straight wins and continued to contend in a four-team race with Detroit, Boston, and New York. It came down to the final week, when the Browns defeated the Yankees five times, winning the pennant by a game over Detroit. It was the only championship the franchise won in St. Louis. Nine years later, after the 1953 season, the Browns were sold and became the Baltimore Orioles.

=== Season chronology ===
- May 26, 1944: In a game against the Boston Red Sox, Nels Potter retired the first 23 batters and was on his way to pitching a perfect game when Jim Tabor got a hit in the 8th inning.
- June 15, 1944: Frank Demaree was released by the Browns.
- July 20, 1944: Nels Potter took to the hill against Yankees' pitcher Hank Borowy. The Yankees third base coach Art Fletcher noticed that Potter was moistening his fingers. After Browns manager Luke Sewell consulted with Potter, Potter proceeded to make a deliberate motion with his fingers to his mouth. Umpire Cal Hubbard ejected Potter from the game. On July 22, American League President Will Harridge suspended Potter for 10 days for throwing an illegal pitch. Potter was the first pitcher to be suspended by Major League Baseball for that reason.
- Every team in the league hosted a game where net proceeds went toward the National War Relief and Service Inc. On July 26, the second game versus the Philadelphia Athletics was that game. Everyone had to pay their way into the stadium including team management, umpires and players. The crowd of 24,631 was the greatest for a Browns home game since the team's first night game in 1940. Oscar Zahner, chairman of the benefit game committee, announced that $25,000 was raised.
- On August 3, the Browns played the minor league Kansas City Blues. The Browns lost the game by a score of 9–8. The attendance was 5,965, which was Kansas City's best attendance all season. Despite losing, the Browns got 14 hits and Gene Moore went 4–5 with three runs batted in.
- August 8 marked the Browns 70th consecutive day in first place. This broke the club's previous record of 69 days in first place, which had been set in 1922.
- The Browns beat the New York Yankees on August 12. It marked the first four-game series victory over the Yankees since 1940.
- Browns pitcher Nels Potter and Washington player George Case got into an altercation on August 22. The result was a bench clearing brawl and Potter, Case, and Washington player Ed Butka were ejected.
- On September 4, the Browns found themselves out of first place. The Browns slipped to a half game behind the New York Yankees with 22 games left.
- The final series between the Browns and the Senators had its share of tension. In the first game of the series, Senators pitcher Roger Wolff hit Vern Stephens with a pitch. Browns manager Luke Sewell waved a bat in the direction of the pitcher.
- September 21 was the final game between the Browns and the Senators. Browns catcher Tom Turner engaged in a fist fight with Senators player Roberto Ortiz. The two players lined up in a boxing formation in the middle of the field. Ortiz broke his hand and this was bad for the Browns as the Senators were finishing the season against the Detroit Tigers. At the time of the Browns-Senators game, the Tigers were in first place. The conflicts strained the friendship of Washington manager Ossie Bluege and Luke Sewell. The two were teammates in Washington from 1933 to 1934.
- After the Browns farm team, the Toledo Mud Hens was eliminated from the American Association, the Browns called three players to bolster their team for their stretch run. The callups were Earl Jones (10–6 for the Mudhens), infielder Len Schulte (.296 batting average, 96 RBI's), and outfielder Babe Martin, the American Association Most Valuable Player.
- With six games left in the season, the Browns and Tigers had identical 84–64 records. The last six games of the season for the Browns were against the Boston Red Sox and the New York Yankees.
- At the start of play on the very last day of the season (October 1), the Browns and Tigers were still tied with identical 88-65 records. The Tigers, playing Washington at home, had an earlier start time for their game, and fell to the Senators 4–1. Just moments after the Browns had pulled into a 2–2 tie in the fourth on a 2-run homer by Chet Laabs, word reached the St. Louis ball park that Detroit had lost. This meant a Browns victory could clinch the pennant. In the bottom of the fifth, Laabs hit another 2-run shot to put the Browns ahead. Vern Stephens hit a solo homer to lead off the eighth for the Browns, who hung on for the last 2 innings to beat the Yankees 5–2, and win the 1944 AL championship.

=== Opening Day lineup ===
Hal Epps	CF
Don Gutteridge	2B
George McQuinn	1B
Vern Stephens	SS
Gene Moore	RF
Milt Byrnes	LF
Mark Christman	3B
Frank Mancuso	C
Jack Kramer	P

=== Season standings ===
American League
Team	W	L	Pct.	GB	Home	Road
St. Louis Browns	89	65	.578	—	54‍–‍23	35‍–‍42
Detroit Tigers	88	66	.571	1	43‍–‍34	45‍–‍32
New York Yankees	83	71	.539	6	47‍–‍31	36‍–‍40
Boston Red Sox	77	77	.500	12	47‍–‍30	30‍–‍47
Cleveland Indians	72	82	.468	17	39‍–‍38	33‍–‍44
Philadelphia Athletics	72	82	.468	17	39‍–‍37	33‍–‍45
Chicago White Sox	71	83	.461	18	41‍–‍36	30‍–‍47
Washington Senators	64	90	.416	25	40‍–‍37	24‍–‍53

=== Record vs. opponents ===
1944 American League record Sources:
Team	BOS	CWS	CLE	DET	NYY	PHA	SLB	WSH
Boston	—	17–5	8–14	10–12–2	11–11	11–11	10–12	10–12
Chicago	5–17	—	14–8	9–13	10–12	9–13	8–14	16–6
Cleveland	14–8	8–14	—	10–12	8–14	12–10–1	10–12	10–12
Detroit	12–10–2	13–9	12–10	—	14–8	11–11	9–13	17–5
New York	11–11	12–10	14–8	8–14	—	13–9	10–12	15–7
Philadelphia	11–11	13–9	10–12–1	11–11	9–13	—	9–13	9–13
St. Louis	12–10	14–8	12–10	13–9	12–10	13–9	—	13–9
Washington	12–10	6–16	12–10	5–17	7–15	13–9	9–13	—

=== Roster ===
1944 St. Louis Browns
Roster
Pitchers: 16 George Caster; 30 Denny Galehouse; 25 Al Hollingsworth; 27 Willis Hudlin; 22 Sig Jakucki; 19 Jack Kramer; 29 Bob Muncrief; 24 Nels Potter; 21 Tex Shirley; 17 Steve Sundra; 20 Lefty West; 26 Sam Zoldak	Catchers: 9 Red Hayworth; 8 Frank Mancuso; 7 Joe Schultz; 17 Tom Turner; Infielders: 1 Floyd Baker; 7 Mike Chartak; 6 Mark Christman; 2 Ellis Clary; 4 Don Gutteridge; 3 George McQuinn; 5 Vern Stephens	Outfielders: 11 Milt Byrnes; 10 Frank Demaree; 18 Hal Epps; 17 Tom Hafey; 12 Mike Kreevich; 28 Chet Laabs; -- Babe Martin; 15 Gene Moore; 14 Al Zarilla; Other batters: 1 Len Schulte	Manager: 32 Luke Sewell; Coaches: 33 Fred Hofmann; -- Jack Tobin; 34 Zack Taylor

== Player stats ==
= Indicates team leader

= Indicates league leader

=== Batting ===
==== Starters by position ====
Note: Pos = Position; G = Games played; AB = At bats; H = Hits; Avg. = Batting average; HR = Home runs; RBI = Runs batted in

⌖	Player	G	AB	H	AVG	HR	RBI
C	Red Hayworth	89	239	60	.223	1	25
1B	George McQuinn	146	516	129	.250	11	72
2B	Don Gutteridge	148	603	148	.245	3	36
3B	Mark Christman	148	547	148	.271	6	83
SS	Vern Stephens	145	559	164	.293	20	109
OF	Milt Byrnes	128	407	120	.295	4	45
OF	Mike Kreevich	105	402	121	.301	5	44
OF	Gene Moore	110	390	93	.238	6	58

==== Other batters ====
Note: G = Games played; AB = At bats; H = Hits; Avg. = Batting average; HR = Home runs; RBI = Runs batted in

Player	G	AB	H	AVG	HR	RBI
Al Zarilla	100	288	86	.299	6	45
Frank Mancuso	88	244	50	.205	1	24
Chet Laabs	66	201	47	.234	5	33
Floyd Baker	44	97	17	.175	0	5
Mike Chartak	35	72	17	.236	1	7
Hal Epps	22	62	11	.177	0	3
Frank Demaree	16	51	13	.255	0	6
Ellis Clary	25	49	13	.265	0	4
Tom Turner	15	25	8	.320	0	4
Tom Hafey	8	14	5	.357	0	2
Joe Schultz	3	8	2	.250	0	0
Babe Martin	2	4	3	.750	0	0
Len Schulte	1	0	0	----	0	0

=== Pitching ===
==== Starting pitchers ====
Note: G = Games pitched; IP = Innings pitched; W = Wins; L = Losses; ERA = Earned run average; SO = Strikeouts

Player	G	IP	W	L	ERA	SO
Jack Kramer	33	257.0	17	13	2.49	124
Nels Potter	32	232.0	19	7	2.83	91
Bob Muncrief	33	219.1	13	8	3.08	88
Sig Jakucki	35	198.0	13	9	3.55	67
Denny Galehouse	24	153.0	9	10	3.12	80
Steve Sundra	3	19.0	2	0	1.42	1
Al Hollingsworth	26	92.2	5	7	4.47	22
Tex Shirley	23	80.1	5	4	4.15	35

==== Relief pitchers ====
Note: G = Games pitched; Innings pitched; W = Wins; L = Losses; SV = Saves; ERA = Earned run average; SO = Strikeouts

Player	G	IP	W	L	SV	ERA	SO
George Caster	42	81.0	6	6	12*	2.44	46
Sam Zoldak	18	38.2	0	0	0	3.72	15
Lefty West	11	24.1	0	0	0	6.29	11
Willis Hudlin	1	2.0	0	1	0	4.50	1

- Tied with Joe Berry and Gordon Maltzberger

== 1944 World Series ==
NL St. Louis Cardinals (4) vs. AL St. Louis Browns (2)

Game	Score	Date
1	Browns 2, Cardinals 1	October 4
2	Cardinals 3, Browns 2 (11 innings)	October 5
3	Browns 6, Cardinals 2	October 6
4	Cardinals 5, Browns 1	October 7
5	Cardinals 2, Browns 0	October 8
6	Cardinals 3, Browns 1	October 9

== Awards and honors ==
All-Star Game

- George McQuinn, starter
- Vern Stephens, starter
- Bob Muncrief, reserve

=== League leaders ===
- Frank Mancuso, Most errors in a season by a catcher (17)

=== Team leaders ===
- Home runs – Vern Stephens (20)
- RBI – Vern Stephens (109)
- Batting average – Mike Kreevich (.301)
- Hits – Vern Stephens (164)
- Stolen bases – Don Gutteridge (20)
- Wins – Nels Potter (19)
- Earned run average – Jack Kramer (2.49)
- Strikeouts – Jack Kramer (124)

== Farm system ==
Level	Team	League	Manager
AA	Toledo Mud Hens	American Association	Ollie Marquardt
D	Newark Moundsmen	Ohio State League	Clay Bryant

LEAGUE CHAMPIONS: Newark
