= Al Hollingsworth (baseball) =

American baseball player (1908–1996)

- Pitcher
- Born: February 25, 1908; St. Louis, Missouri, U.S.
- Died: April 28, 1996 (aged 88); Austin, Texas, U.S.
- Batted: Left Threw: Left

MLB debut
- April 16, 1935, for the Cincinnati Reds

Last MLB appearance
- September 22, 1946, for the Chicago White Sox

MLB statistics
- Win–loss record: 70–104
- Earned run average: 3.99
- Strikeouts: 608
- Stats at Baseball Reference

Teams
- Cincinnati Reds (1935–1938); Philadelphia Phillies (1938–1939); Brooklyn Dodgers (1939); Washington Senators (1940); St. Louis Browns (1942–1946); Chicago White Sox (1946)

Albert Wayne "Boots" Hollingsworth (February 25, 1908 – April 28, 1996) was an American Major League Baseball pitcher with the Cincinnati Reds, Philadelphia Phillies, Brooklyn Dodgers, Washington Senators, St. Louis Browns and the Chicago White Sox between 1935 and 1946. Born in St. Louis, Missouri, Hollingsworth batted and threw left-handed. He was listed as 6 feet (1.83 m) tall and 174 pounds (79 kg). Hollingsworth earned his nickname when, as a first baseman early in his career, he made an error in the field. He became a full-time pitcher during the 1933 season, his sixth in pro ball.

Hollingsworth was a member of the 1944 Browns, the only St. Louis–based team to win an American League pennant. Ironically, 1944 was Hollingsworth's worst regular season among the four full years he spent as a Brown; he won only five of 12 decisions, posted a poor 4.47 earned run average, and surrendered 108 hits and 37 bases on balls in 92 2/3 innings pitched, with only 22 strikeouts. He appeared in Game 4 of the "All-St. Louis" 1944 World Series, allowing one run in four innings pitched in relief of starting pitcher Sig Jakucki. He had two stellar seasons for the Browns, however, in 1942 and 1945, each time compiling winning records with an ERA of under 3.00.

Hollingsworth was also involved in a noteworthy trade earlier in his career when, on June 13, 1938, he was sent by Cincinnati to the Philadelphia Phillies along with catcher Spud Davis and $50,000 in cash for right-handed pitcher Bucky Walters. Walters would win 160 of 267 decisions during his Cincinnati pitching career, and help lead the Reds to the 1939 and 1940 National League pennants, and the 1940 World Series championship.

Hollingsworth appeared in 315 Major League games pitched, 185 as a starting pitcher. In 1,520 1/3 innings, he allowed 1,642 hits and 587 bases on balls, with 608 strikeouts, seven shutouts and 15 saves. His professional playing career lasted for 20 consecutive seasons, including minor league service. He then had a lengthy post-playing career as a manager in the St. Louis Cardinals and Cleveland Indians organizations, the pitching coach for the Cardinals from April 29, 1957, through 1958, and a scout for the Redbirds, Washington Senators, Houston Astros and Oakland Athletics.

As a hitter, Hollingsworth posted a .196 batting average (103-for-525) with 53 runs, 2 home runs, 32 RBIs and 23 bases on balls. Defensively, he recorded a .966 fielding percentage.

Hollingsworth died April 28, 1996, in Austin, Texas, aged 88.

== See also ==
- List of St. Louis Cardinals coaches

Sporting positions
Preceded by Bill Posedel	St. Louis Cardinals pitching coach 1957–1958	Succeeded by Howie Pollet
