= Sig Jakucki =

American baseball player

- Pitcher
- Born: August 20, 1909; Camden, New Jersey, U.S.
- Died: May 29, 1979 (aged 69); Galveston, Texas, U.S.
- Batted: Right Threw: Right

MLB debut
- August 30, 1936, for the St. Louis Browns

Last MLB appearance
- August 29, 1945, for the St. Louis Browns

MLB statistics
- Win–loss record: 25–22
- Earned run average: 3.79
- Strikeouts: 131
- Stats at Baseball Reference

Teams
- St. Louis Browns (1936, 1944–1945)

Sigmund Jakucki (August 20, 1909 – May 28, 1979), nicknamed "Sig" or "Jack", was an American pitcher in Major League Baseball who appeared in 72 games over all or part of three seasons (1936 and 1944–1945) for the St. Louis Browns. He is best known for defeating the New York Yankees, 5–2, in the final game of the 1944 regular season to clinch the American League (AL) pennant for the Browns, their only AL championship. A hard-throwing right-hander, he was listed as 6 feet 2 inches (1.88 m) tall and 198 pounds (90 kg).

A Camden, New Jersey, native, Jakucki relocated to Galveston, Texas, in 1934. Formerly a shortstop and outfielder, it was in Galveston where he became primarily a pitcher. He first pitched with the Browns in 1936 but failed to make their roster in 1937 and stopped playing professionally after 1938. However, due to a shortage of available players during World War II, the Browns sent him a letter inviting him to 1944 spring training. He made the roster and threw four shutouts as the Browns bested the Detroit Tigers in the pennant race. He started Game 4 of the 1944 World Series against the St. Louis Cardinals but took the loss, as the Cardinals ultimately won the series in six games. Jakucki was the Opening Day starter for the Browns in 1945 but was suspended from the team in September after showing up drunk to a team train ride. He pitched two more seasons in the minor leagues, then returned to Galveston, where he spent the rest of his life. He was well known for his penchant for alcohol, as well as his combative nature.

== Early life ==
Sigmund "Jack" Jakucki was born on August 20, 1909, in Camden, New Jersey, the son of blacksmith John Jakucki and his wife, Johanna. Both were Polish immigrants who attended St. Joseph's Catholic Church. Sig had one older brother (Henry) and two younger siblings (Theodore and Florentina). They grew up in Liberty Park, a mainly Polish neighborhood. The Jakuckis had little money, and Sig stopped attending school after the seventh grade to work odd jobs. He started playing baseball as a shortstop and outfielder for his church's team, which competed against local semipro teams.

In 1927, Jakucki joined the United States Army and spent most of the next four years at the Schofield Army Barracks in Honolulu, Hawaii, serving with the 11th Field Artillery. Continuing to play baseball with his regiment's team, Jakucki established a reputation as one of his team's best hitters. He was discharged from the Army in 1931 before finishing his second tour of duty with them. Officially, the discharge was for medical reasons, but a local baseball promoter may have helped attain the early release. Jakucki joined the semipro Honolulu Braves, still playing shortstop and outfield but now occasionally pitching. This brought him exposure to Major League Baseball (MLB) personnel when the Braves played an all-star team consisting of several MLB regulars. Against a Japanese team in Tokyo, he reportedly hit three home runs in a game. Jakucki played with another Honolulu semipro team called Asahi, even though the club was primarily for Hawaiians with Japanese ancestry.

== Professional career ==
=== First stop: The Oakland Oaks (1934) ===
After Jakucki attracted the attention of Bill Inman, a scout for the San Francisco Seals of the Class AA Pacific Coast League (PCL), the ballplayer journeyed to California to try out for the team. San Francisco signed him but was unimpressed with how he fared against their pitchers during spring training, and his contract was sold to the Oakland Oaks before the season. He batted just .202 in 84 at bats before his contract was sold again, this time to the Galveston Buccaneers of the Class A Texas League.

=== Welcome to Galveston (1934–1936) ===
At Galveston, manager Bill Webb decided Jakucki was better suited as a pitcher. "I guess being sent to Galveston was a good break for me. I could play shortstop or in the outfield good enough to stand out in Hawaii ... I could hit that kind of competition, but when I got into Class AA or A ball, well, you had to have more to get by," Jakucki later reflected. In 28 games, he had a 10–7 record and a 3.20 earned run average (ERA) in 138 innings pitched.

During the 1935 season, Jakucki hit Johnny Keane in the head with a pitch, putting the prospect in the hospital for a week with a coma. He went 15–14 for Galveston, with a 3.45 ERA. Control was not Jakucki's strong point, as he walked 117 hitters in 279 innings.

Against the Houston Buffaloes in June 1936, Jakucki demonstrated his temper. Following persistent teasing by Buffaloes fans, Jakucki and manager/teammate Jack Mealey charged into the stands and began punching the spectators. Both were suspended indefinitely, though Jakucki returned to the club a week later. On July 16, he pitched a seven-inning no-hitter against the Oklahoma City Indians. The fine outing caught the attention of major league scouts, and the St. Louis Browns acquired his rights on August 18. Though his overall numbers with Galveston were not great, he pitched his best the final six weeks of the season. He had a 10–19 record (ranking third in the Texas League in losses, behind Beryl Richmond's 21 and Harold Hillin's 20), a 4.22 ERA, and 111 walks in 237 innings pitched.

=== Major league debut (1936) ===
With the Browns, Jakucki made his debut in the second game of a doubleheader against the Washington Senators on August 30. Pitching six innings, he allowed only four hits but walked seven batters, surrendering five runs (four earned) and taking the loss in a 7–4 defeat. Jakucki started only one more game for the Browns all season but did appear in five others as a relief pitcher. He pitched poorly for the Browns, going 0–3 with an 8.71 ERA in 202/3 innings pitched.

=== Back to the minors, years off (1937–1943) ===
Jakucki attended spring training with the Browns in 1937 but was optioned to Galveston (now a Class A1 franchise) before the season. Instead of reporting, he went missing for several days. When he finally did report, he struggled, going 3–6 with a 5.70 ERA in 12 games (10 starts). The Buccaneers sold his contract to the New Orleans Pelicans of the Class A1 Southern Association, where he had much more success. In 24 games (18 starts), he had a 12–6 record, ranking third in the league with a 2.75 ERA. While attending a wrestling match in Atlanta, he and teammate Euel Moore took part in the fighting. According to Arthur Daley of The New York Times, Jakucki "flattened" the referee, also taking on the spectators and the contestants before getting arrested. Team owner Larry Gilbert waited a few days before bailing him out of jail, then traded Jakucki to the PCL's Los Angeles Angels.

With the Angels, Jakucki only appeared in six games before getting sent to the Texas League's Shreveport Sports. He only pitched in three games for the Sports before leaving the team, coming back to Galveston, where he had lived since 1934. For the next several years, he worked as a paperhanger and painter, also laboring in shipyards and pitching for various semi-pro teams. He participated in the National Baseball Congress (NBC) World Series in Wichita, Kansas, in 1940 as the star pitcher on a Houston team. In 1941, he was disqualified from the tournament because he had signed contracts with two teams. He took the loss in a 2–1 decision in the 1942 tournament, then drunkenly confronted the home plate umpire, holding him over the edge of a bridge before police officers had to brandish guns to arrest him. NBC president Ray Dumont called Jakucki the organization's "most persistent problem child", yet Jakucki was elected to the NBC Hall of Fame in 1942.

=== Surprise return to the Browns (1944–1945) ===
==== The return ====
During World War II, the Browns ran short of players and wrote Jakucki a letter inviting him to 1944 spring training. Impressing with his fastball, he made their roster. Making his first MLB appearance in eight years on April 20, he pitched a complete game, defeating the Detroit Tigers 8–5 for his first MLB win. He made some relief appearances in May but was mostly used as a starter thereafter. Against the Tigers in consecutive starts on June 17 and 23, he threw shutouts. After losing his next start 1–0 to the New York Yankees on June 29, he shutout the Philadelphia Athletics in the first game of a July 4 doubleheader. Buoyed by strong pitching, the historically terrible Browns found themselves unexpected contenders for the American League pennant. "Finding Jakucki was a tremendous break. It looks like he might have made the difference between success and failure," stated The Sporting News on August 17. He held the Red Sox to five hits in a 1–0 victory over them on September 26, his fourth shutout of the year, which kept St. Louis tied with Detroit for the AL lead. Entering the final day of the season (October 1), the teams were still tied; contemporary sportswriter John Drebinger called it the "most dramatic finish any championship campaign has ever seen".

==== Pennant-clinching game ====
Browns manager Luke Sewell picked Jakucki to start the team's final game. Knowing his penchant for alcohol, his teammates pleaded for him not to drink the night before so he would be sharp for the game. "I went to bed at 6 in the morning and the game didn’t start until 1:30," Jakucki recalled. "I was there." Facing the Yankees in front of 35,518 fans, the most in Sportsmans Park history, Jakucki pitched a six-hit, complete game in which he allowed only two runs (one earned). He got the win, and the Tigers lost their game, giving the Browns the pennant. "Drunk or not, Big Sig was competitive," observed Bob Broeg, a sports reporter in St. Louis for many years. In 35 games (24 starts), he had a 13–9 record, a 3.55 ERA, 67 strikeouts, 54 walks, and 211 hits allowed in 198 innings pitched.

==== 1944 World Series ====
In the 1944 World Series, Jakucki started Game 4 on October 7, with his underdog Browns leading two games to one. But he allowed a first-inning, two-run home run to Stan Musial of the St. Louis Cardinals, permitted four runs (three earned), and lasted only three full innings. The Cardinals won the game, 5–1. That was Jakucki's only outing of the series, as the Cardinals went on to take the next two contests to deny the Browns a world championship.

==== Opening Day starter ====
The Opening Day starter for the Browns in 1945, Jakucki held the Tigers to six hits in a 7–1 victory. Facing the Athletics on June 1, he threw a shutout in a 4–0 victory. He won six decisions in a row before the All-Star break. On June 20, he played a role in one of baseball's most violent brawls. Tired of listening to verbal abuse from Chicago White Sox batting practice pitcher Karl Scheel, Jakucki and several other teammates charged into his dugout and beat him up. However, Jakucki was not suspended.

==== Kicked off the team ====
After going 9–5 with a 2.91 ERA before the All-Star Break, Jakucki went 3–5 with a 4.66 ERA in the season's second half. In his last outing of the year, on August 29 against the Tigers, he allowed four runs (two earned) in 2 1/3 innings, through the Browns ultimately won the game 5–4. Two days later, Sewell refused to let him take a train with the team to Chicago because he showed up drunk. Jakucki challenged his manager and the Browns coaches to a fight, then slipped into a different passenger car. Discovered before the train had made it five miles, he was ejected at the Delmar Boulevard station. Still determined to reach Chicago, Jakucki rode a freight train there but was not allowed a room when he arrived at the team's hotel. The Browns suspended him for the rest of the season. In 30 games (24 starts), he had a 12–10 record, a 3.51 ERA, 55 strikeouts, 65 walks, and 188 hits allowed in 192 1/3 innings.

=== Special treatment (1946–1947) ===
Before the 1946 season, the Browns lifted Jakucki's suspension. They sought to trade him, but when no MLB teams expressed a desire to acquire him, the Browns assigned him to the San Antonio Missions in the Texas League (now rated Class AA). Manager Jimmy Adair informed the ballclub before the start of the season that there would be two sets of rules, one for Jakucki and one for the rest of the team. Jakucki did not have to attend any of the games unless the local newspaper stated that he would be pitching that day. The system worked well for the most part, except that some days Jakucki would show up drunk and not last very long during the game. "I just don't understand why I keep abusing myself like this," he told teammate Ned Garver. Sometimes when he was not pitching, he would come watch San Antonio's games from the stands, usually with "a girl on each arm" according to Garver. In 36 games (28 starts), Jakucki had a 15–10 record, a 2.16 ERA, 122 strikeouts, 74 walks, and 219 hits allowed in 233 innings. Though his efforts helped San Antonio make the playoffs, he left the ballclub without permission during the postseason.

No longer wanted by the Missions, Jakucki signed with the PCL's Seattle Rainiers in 1947. He alternated between starting and relieving for the team in the first part of the season. Then, the Rainiers traded him to the PCL's Sacramento Solons on July 31, but Jakucki decided to go back to Galveston. Suspended by the Solons, he never played professionally again.

== Career statistics ==
In his brief MLB career, Jakucki put up a 25–22 won–lost record, with 27 complete games (in 50 total starts), five shutouts, and four saves. Pitching 411 total innings, he surrendered 431 hits. He issued 131 walks and recorded the same number of strikeouts. His career ERA was 3.79.

== Pitching style, alcohol issues, and combativeness ==
Jakucki, a right-hander, was listed as 6 feet 2 inches (1.88 m) tall and 198 pounds (90 kg). His fastball helped him make the Browns roster in 1944. Though he struggled with controlling his pitches early in his career, Garver observed in 1946 that he had "good control" when sober. Possessing a durable arm, it did not take Jakucki long to get ready for games.

Jakucki was well known for his penchant for alcohol. Browns teammate Denny Galehouse stopped short of calling him an alcoholic but admitted that Jakucki "drank a lot"; Garver said that "he had a problem with alcohol." Once, when the Browns were in Boston, Jakucki threw up on the mound. "I went in and got a glass of water in the clubhouse and came back out and finished the game," he recalled, pointing out that St. Louis still won.

Jakucki was also known for his combativeness. "Jakucki used to spit on your shoes and dare you to do something about it," said teammate Joe Schultz Jr. While he and teammate Ellis Clary were drinking at a Manhattan bar one night, a gangster pulled a gun on the pitcher. Taking it away from him, Jakucki knocked him out. "He was like Al Capone rolling around at night," Clary described the pitcher. Garver and opposing player Jimmy Outlaw both observed that Jakucki would fight at any time. He tormented teammate Pete Gray, who had only one arm. One day, the two got into an argument, and Jakucki challenged Gray to a fight, holding one arm behind his back. However, he denied actually going through with the fight, saying "I wouldn't fight anyone who only had one arm."

== Later years ==
Back in Galveston, Jakucki continued to work different occupations, such as doing painting and laboring in the shipyards. The ex-pitcher could often be found hanging out on a park bench, which he termed his "office". He gave up drinking in 1961 because of cirrhosis. However, he smoked multiple packages of cigarettes a day. By 1978, he was suffering from emphysema. He had little money, as he had not pitched long enough to receive an MLB pension and he did not receive Social Security payments. On May 29, 1979, he was discovered dead at the age of 69 in his room at the Panama Hotel, a cheap inn in Galveston. He was buried in Galveston's Calvary Cemetery, with his surname mistakenly spelled "Jackucki".
