= Luke Sewell =

American baseball player, coach, and manager (1901–1987)

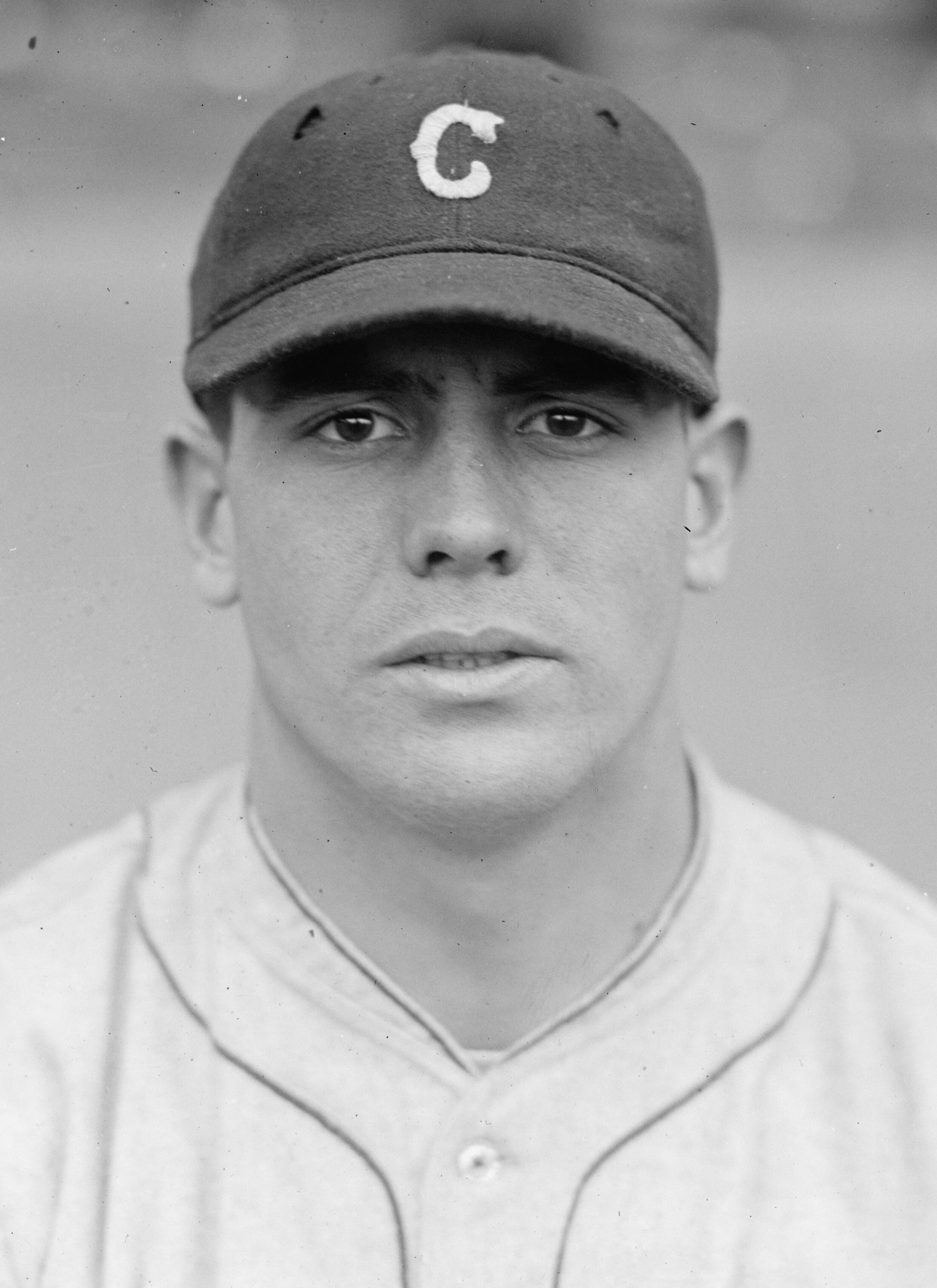
- Sewell in 1924
- Catcher / Manager
- Born: January 5, 1901; Titus, Alabama, U.S.
- Died: May 14, 1987 (aged 86); Akron, Ohio, U.S.
- Batted: Right Threw: Right

MLB debut
- June 30, 1921, for the Cleveland Indians

Last MLB appearance
- August 1, 1942, for the St. Louis Browns

MLB statistics
- Batting average: .259
- Home runs: 20
- Runs batted in: 698
- Managerial record: 606–644
- Winning %: .485
- Stats at Baseball Reference
- Managerial record at Baseball Reference

Teams
- As player: Cleveland Indians (1921–1932); Washington Senators (1933–1934); Chicago White Sox (1935–1938); Cleveland Indians (1939); St. Louis Browns (1942); As manager: St. Louis Browns (1941–1946); Cincinnati Reds (1949–1952)

Career highlights and awards
- All-Star (1937)

James Luther "Luke" Sewell (January 5, 1901 – May 14, 1987) was an American professional baseball player, coach, and manager. He played in Major League Baseball as a catcher for the Cleveland Indians (1921–1932, 1939), Washington Senators (1933–1934), Chicago White Sox (1935–1938), and the St. Louis Browns (1942). Sewell batted and threw right-handed. He was regarded as one of the best defensive catchers of his era.

He spent 10 seasons playing with his brother Joe Sewell, a Hall of Fame shortstop. He had another brother named Tommy Sewell, who had one at-bat with the Chicago Cubs.

Sewell managed the Browns from 1941 to 1946, initially as a player-manager. The Browns won the American League pennant in 1944. He later managed the Cincinnati Reds from 1949 to 1952

== Baseball career ==
Born in the rural town of Titus, Alabama, Sewell grew up wanting to play baseball. He attended Wetumpka High School and graduated from the University of Alabama where, he played for the Alabama Crimson Tide baseball team as an infielder. He was linked to the Cleveland Indians because his brother Joe Sewell became their starting shortstop in 1920. When Cleveland scout Patsy Flaherty signed Sewell, he insisted that he play as a catcher. He began the 1921 season with the Columbus Senators in the American Association but, after only 17 minor league games, Sewell made his major league debut with Cleveland on June 30, 1921.

Sewell served as a reserve catcher, working behind Steve O'Neill until the 1923 season when O'Neill was injured in an auto accident. Sewell then played in a platoon role alongside Glenn Myatt, in which the left-hand hitting Myatt played the team's home games at League Park due to its 290-foot distance to the right field fence, while Sewell played the team's road games. Sewell eventually took over as the Indians number one catcher in the 1926 season, due to his superior defensive skills. He finished the year with only a .238 batting average but led the American League catchers with 91 assists.

In 1927, Sewell had a breakout year, hitting for a career-high .294 batting average with 27 doubles, 53 runs batted in (RBI), and scored 52 runs. Sewell questioned Babe Ruth's integrity in a game on June 11, 1927. He demanded that umpires check Ruth's bat after he clouted two straight home runs off Garland Buckeye. Although he led the league's catchers with 20 errors, he also led the league with 119 assists and 71 baserunners caught stealing. Despite the fact that Cleveland finished the season in sixth place, Sewell ranked ninth in voting for the 1927 American League Most Valuable Player Award. In 1928, he once again led the league's catchers with 117 assists and 60 baserunners caught stealing and ranked 12th in voting for the 1928 American League Most Valuable Player Award.

In 1933, Sewell was traded to the Washington Senators for catcher Roy Spencer. Sewell posted career-highs with 125 hits and 30 doubles, as the Senators, under first-year player-manager Joe Cronin, won 99 games to clinch the American League pennant by nine games over the New York Yankees. During an April game against the Yankees, Sewell made an odd double play. Lou Gehrig and Dixie Walker were on base when Tony Lazzeri hit a ball to deep right field. Gehrig hesitated as he waited to see if the ball would be caught, before heading towards home plate with Walker right behind him. Sewell caught right fielder Goose Goslin's throw and tagged both runners out with one sweeping motion. Cronin credited Sewell as a major factor in helping the Senators' pitching staff. The Senators lost to the New York Giants in the 1933 World Series. In what would be his only postseason appearance as a player, Sewell posted a .176 batting average (3 for 17), with one stolen base, one run scored, and one RBI during the five-game series.

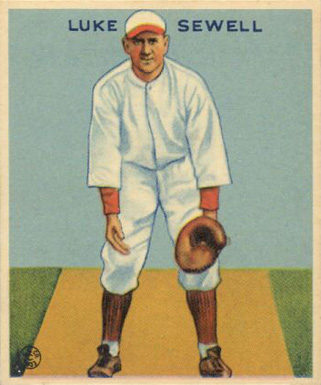
Sewell's 1933 Goudey trading card

Sewell began the 1934 season with a hand injury and didn't play his first game until June 13. Two weeks later, he was struck in the head and knocked unconscious by a pitch thrown by St. Louis Browns pitcher, Bump Hadley. Sewell ended the season with a .237 batting average.

In January 1935, Sewell was traded to the St. Louis Browns, ironically for Bump Hadley. The Browns promptly traded him to the Chicago White Sox on the very same day. His offensive statistics improved with the White Sox, posting a .285 batting average with 67 RBI and, finished second among the league's catchers in assists and third in fielding percentage. In 1936, Sewell produced career-highs with 5 home runs and 73 RBI and, led American League catchers in assists and in baserunners caught stealing. By the first week of June 1937, Sewell had a .316 batting average to earn a spot as a reserve for the American League team in the 1937 All-Star Game. That year, he put up even better numbers than the consistently good ones he had been posting for a decade. On the season, he had a .269 batting average, with a .343 on-base percentage and six triples. Sewell finished the season ranked fifth in voting for the 1937 American League Most Valuable Player Award.

Sewell's batting average dropped to .213 in 1938 and, in December of that year, he was purchased by the Brooklyn Dodgers for $7500. In April 1939, the 39-year-old Sewell was released by the Dodgers but, promptly signed a contract as a third-string catcher and pitching coach for the Cleveland Indians. The Indians hoped to groom him as an eventual replacement for manager Oscar Vitt who had fallen from the graces of general manager Cy Slapnicka. He spent the 1940 season as a pitching coach but, when the Indians decided to hire Roger Peckinpaugh as their manager for the 1941 season, Sewell accepted the manager's position with the St. Louis Browns, replacing Fred Haney. Because of the shortage of major league players during the Second World War, Sewell served as a player-manager during the 1942 season, appearing in six games. He played his final game as a player on August 1, 1942 at the age of 41.

== Career statistics ==
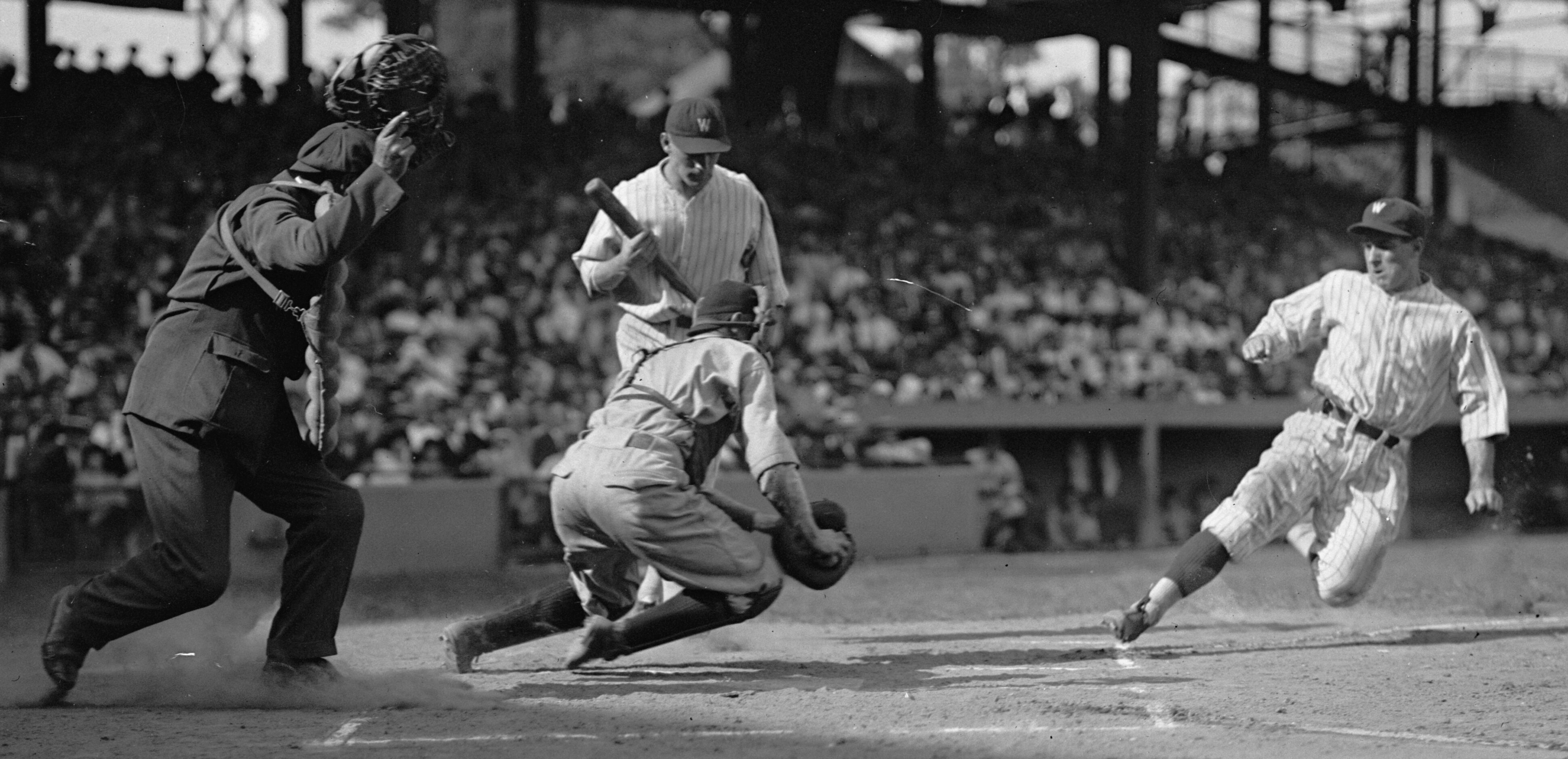
Sewell (center, foreground) gets ready to tag out Senators baserunner Bucky Harris (right). Umpire Tommy Connolly (left) called Harris out at the plate.

In a 20-year major league career, Sewell played in 1,630 games, accumulating 1,393 hits in 5,383 at bats for a .259 career batting average along with 20 home runs, 698 RBI and an on-base percentage of .323. He had a .978 fielding percentage. Sewell had a strong throwing arm, leading American League catchers four times in baserunners caught stealing and four times in assists.

Even for the era, Sewell's low strikeout numbers were remarkable. He never struck out more than 27 times in a season, and his career best was just 16 strikeouts in 451 at bats in 1936. Sewell held the American League record of 20 seasons as an active catcher until Carlton Fisk surpassed the record with 24 seasons as an active catcher with the Boston Red Sox (1969, 1971–1980) and the Chicago White Sox (1981–1993). Sewell caught three no-hitters in his career; Wes Ferrell in 1931, Vern Kennedy in 1935, and Bill Dietrich in 1938. In his 2001 book, The Bill James Historical Baseball Abstract, baseball writer Bill James ranked Sewell as the fourth best catcher in the American League during his career, behind Mickey Cochrane, Bill Dickey, and Rick Ferrell, all of whom were inducted into the Baseball Hall of Fame.

== Managing career ==
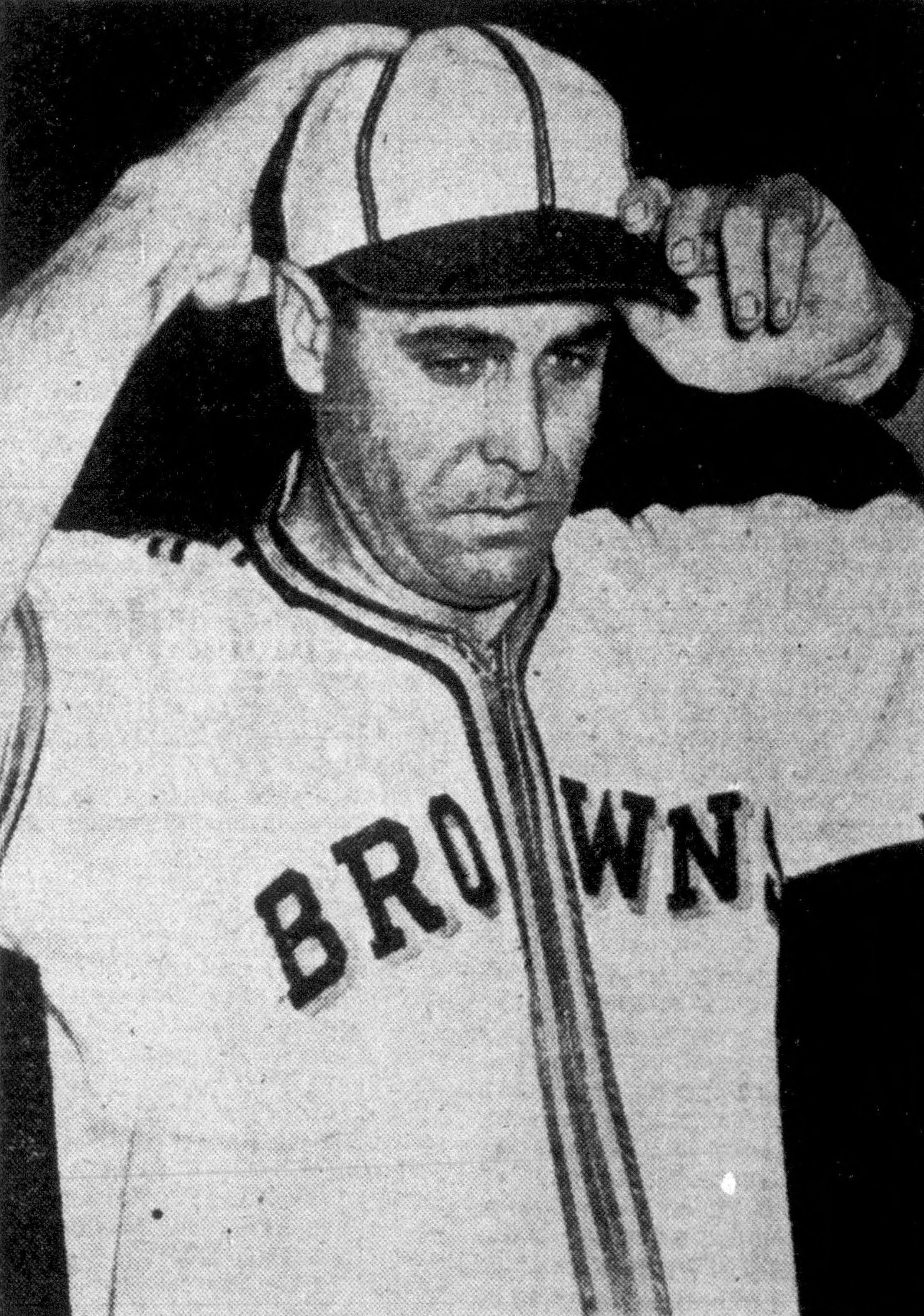
Sewell during the 1944 season

After retiring as an active player, Sewell continued to manage the St. Louis Browns. He led them to the 1944 American League pennant, the team's only championship in its 52 years in St. Louis, although they lost to the St. Louis Cardinals in the 1944 World Series. That year, he managed such players as Red Hayworth, Vern Stephens, and Jack Kramer and led them to an 89–65 record. He won The Sporting News' Manager of the Year Award. After a seventh-place finish in 1946, Sewell stepped down as the Browns' manager.

In January 1949, Sewell was hired as a pitching coach by the Cincinnati Reds and, in October, he took over as the Reds' manager from Bucky Walters. After two unsuccessful seasons with the Reds, he resigned in July 1952 and was replaced by Rogers Hornsby. Sewell's major league managerial record was 606–644, a .485 winning percentage.

In December 1953, Sewell was hired as manager of the Toronto Maple Leafs of the International League. He led the team to the league championship in his first season and won the International League Manager of the Year Award. Sewell led the Maple Leafs to a second-place finish in 1955. The team had a .622 winning percentage over his two years as manager. In November 1955, he was named as the manager for the Seattle Rainiers of the Pacific Coast League. In August 1956, Sewell was fired after less than one season in part due to player discontent over his managerial style.

Sewell died in Akron, Ohio in 1987 at the age of 86.

=== Managerial record ===
Team	Year	Regular season					Postseason			
Team	Year	Games	Won	Lost	Win %	Finish	Won	Lost	Win %	Result
SLB	1941	110	55	55	.500	6th in AL	–	–	–	–
SLB	1942	151	82	69	.543	3rd in AL	–	–	–	–
SLB	1943	152	72	80	.474	6th in AL	–	–	–	–
SLB	1944	154	89	65	.578	1st in AL	2	4	.333	Lost World Series (STL)
SLB	1945	151	81	70	.536	3rd in AL	–	–	–	–
SLB	1946	124	53	71	.427	resigned	–	–	–	–
SLB total		842	432	410	.513		2	4	.333	
CIN	1949	3	1	2	.333	7th in NL	–	–	–	–
CIN	1950	153	66	87	.431	6th in NL	–	–	–	–
CIN	1951	154	68	86	.442	6th in NL	–	–	–	–
CIN	1952	98	39	59	.398	resigned	–	–	–	–
CIN total		408	174	234	.426		0	0	–	
Total		1250	606	644	.485		2	4	.333	

== See also ==
- List of Major League Baseball player–managers
