= Tex Shirley =

American baseball player

- Pitcher
- Born: April 25, 1918; Birthright, Texas, U.S.
- Died: November 7, 1993 (aged 75); DeSoto, Texas, U.S.
- Batted: Switch Threw: Right

MLB debut
- September 6, 1941, for the Philadelphia Athletics

Last MLB appearance
- September 21, 1946, for the St. Louis Browns

MLB statistics
- Win–loss record: 19–30
- Earned run average: 4.25
- Strikeouts: 168
- Stats at Baseball Reference

Teams
- Philadelphia Athletics (1941–1942); St. Louis Browns (1944–1946)

Alvis Newman "Tex" Shirley (April 25, 1918 – November 7, 1993) was an American professional baseball pitcher who appeared in 128 games (including 27 as a pinch runner) in Major League Baseball (MLB) for the Philadelphia Athletics (1941–1942) and St. Louis Browns (1944–1946). Born in Birthright, Texas, he was a switch-hitter who threw right-handed and was listed as 6 feet 1 inch (1.85 m) tall and 175 pounds (79 kg).

== Baseball career ==
Shirley's ten-year career began in 1939 for the Abbeville A's of the Class D Evangeline League. In his third pro season, he was recalled from the Class B Interstate League to the Athletics in September 1941 to appear in five late-season games. He dropped his only decision, but pitched effectively out of the bullpen, allowing only two earned runs in 71/3 innings pitched. In 1942, however, he was treated harshly, posting a 5.30 earned run average in 352/3 innings, and he spent 1943 back in the minor leagues.

After signing with the Browns as a free agent in January 1944, Shirley spent three full campaigns in the American League. In his first full year, he contributed to the 1944 Browns' pennant drive. Appearing in 23 games, 11 as a starting pitcher, he posted a 5–4 record and a 4.15 ERA, with two complete games and one shutout. He appeared in Game 4 of the 1944 World Series, permitting no runs on two hits in two innings pitched. The Browns lost the "all-St. Louis" Fall Classic to the Cardinals in six games.

In 1945, Shirley dropped 12 of 20 decisions, but compiled a 3.63 earned run average and fired seven complete games and two shutouts; he earned one of each when he hurled 13 scoreless innings against the Philadelphia Athletics on June 3 in a game that was ruled a tie.

Altogether, in 102 MLB games pitched, Shirley won 19 games, lost 30, and compiled a career 4.25 ERA, with 19 complete games, three shutouts and two saves. In 4462/3 innings pitched, he allowed 443 hits and 290 bases on balls, with 168 strikeouts.

He returned to the minor leagues in 1947, and retired from the pro game the following season.

== Later life ==
Alvis "Tex" Shirley died at age 75 in DeSoto, Texas, on November 7, 1993.
