= 1945 Major League Baseball All-Star Game =

Cancelled 1945 American baseball competition

- Teams: National League (No roster); American League (No roster)
- Date: July 10, 1945 (Cancelled)
- Venue: Fenway Park (Cancelled)
- City: Boston, Massachusetts (Cancelled)
- Managers: Billy Southworth, St. Louis Cardinals (Cancelled); Luke Sewell, St. Louis Browns (Cancelled)

The 1945 Major League Baseball All-Star Game was cancelled on April 24 after the Major League Baseball (MLB) season began on April 17. The July 10 game was cancelled due to wartime travel restrictions in World War II. 1945 is the first of two years since 1933, when the first official All-Star Game was played, that an All-Star Game was cancelled and All-Stars were not officially selected.

This was to have been the 13th annual playing of the "Midsummer Classic" by MLB's American League (AL) and National League (NL) All-Star teams. The game was to be played at Fenway Park, home of the AL's Boston Red Sox. Fenway Park was chosen for the 1946 Major League Baseball All-Star Game (13th "Midsummer Classic") which was played on July 9 of that year.

On July 9 and 10, 1945, seven out of eight scheduled interleague night games were advertised and played as "All-Star" games in place of the official All-Star Game during the three-day All-Star break to help support the American Red Cross and the National War Fund. Four of the exhibition games were played on July 10 in Washington, D.C., St. Louis, Philadelphia, and Boston.

Germany had surrendered in May 1945. Mike Todd, a Broadway producer, had passed on the idea of holding the 1945 All-Star Game in Nuremberg, at a stadium renamed "Soldier Field" where U.S. troops stationed in the European Theater played baseball. Although baseball's new commissioner, Happy Chandler was reportedly "intrigued" by the idea, it was ultimately dismissed as impractical by military advisors. The next time an All-Star game got cancelled was the 2020 game due to the COVID-19 pandemic in the United States.

== MLB All-Stars (none) ==
No MLB players were officially named to the All-Star teams in 1945, due to the cancellation of the All-Star Game. The All-Star rosters for the AL and NL All-Star teams were to have been selected by each All-Star squad's manager (from 1935 through 1946), which did not occur that season.

== The Sporting News All-Star Team ==
The Sporting News (TSN) named an annual major league All-Star Team from 1925 to 1961 (from 1961 to present an American and National League team is named) from a Baseball Writers' Association of America (BBWA) members ballot.

The Sporting News All-Star Team made up of eleven members (one player in italics has since been inducted into the National Baseball Hall of Fame), is shown here:

- P – Hank Borowy, Yankees
- P – Dave Ferriss, Red Sox
- P – Hal Newhouser, Tigers
- C – Paul Richards, Tigers
- 1B – Phil Cavarretta, Cubs
- 2B – Snuffy Stirnweiss, Yankees
- 3B – Whitey Kurowski, Cardinals
- SS – Marty Marion, Cardinals
- OF – Thomas Holmes, Braves
- OF – Andy Pafko, Cubs
- OF – Goody Rosen, Dodgers

== Associated Press and The Sporting News (Fred Lieb) All-Stars ==
A group of sportswriters of the Associated Press (AP) did name 40 AL and NL All-Stars in 1945, after taking nominations from 13 of the 16 MLB managers that season. The managers who did not participate were Joe McCarthy of the New York Yankees, Luke Sewell of the St. Louis Browns, and Billy Southworth of the St. Louis Cardinals. Sewell (AL) and Southworth (NL) were the 1944 pennant championship team's managers and were to have managed the 1945 All-Star Game teams. Although Sewell could not officially select anyone for the AL All-Star roster, he listed his personal AL All-Stars as pitcher Dave Ferriss of the Red Sox and third baseman Tony Cuccinello of the White Sox.

Fred Lieb a sportswriter for the Sporting News (TSN) also wrote an article in the July 12, 1945, issue selecting 40 All-stars for the two All-Star teams, even naming starting position players and three possible starting pitchers. Some of Lieb's selections are different than the AP selections. The annual TSN All-Stars list is released after the season. Tigers catcher, Paul Richards is the only annual TSN All-Star not in the AP and Lieb selections for 1945.

The AP sportswriters and Lieb's (TSN) All-Star rosters (6 of the players in italics have since been inducted into the National Baseball Hall of Fame) are shown here:

=== American League ===
Pitchers
Position	Player	Team	Selection
P	Hal Newhouser	Tigers	AP, SN (starter)
P	Dave Ferriss	Red Sox	AP, SN (starter)
P	Hank Borowy	Yankees	AP, SN (starter)
P	Russ Christopher	Athletics	AP, SN
P	Steve Gromek	Indians	AP, SN
P	Dutch Leonard	Senators	AP, SN
P	Allie Reynolds	Indians	AP
P	Thornton Lee	White Sox	AP
P	Al Benton	Tigers	SN
P	Roger Wolff	Senators	SN
P	Jack Kramer	Browns	SN

Position Players
Position	Player	Team	Selection
C	Mike Tresh	White Sox	AP, SN (starter)
C	Rick Ferrell	Senators	AP, SN
C	Frankie Hayes	Indians	AP, SN
1B	Nick Etten	Yankees	AP, SN (starter)
1B	George McQuinn	Browns	AP
1B	Dick Siebert	Athletics	SN
2B	Snuffy Stirnweiss	Yankees	AP, SN (starter)
2B	Eddie Mayo	Tigers	AP, SN
3B	Tony Cuccinello	White Sox	AP, SN (starter)
3B	Oscar Grimes	Yankees	AP
3B	Mark Christman	Browns	SN
SS	Vern Stephens	Browns	AP, SN (starter)
SS	Lou Boudreau	Indians	AP, SN
OF	George Case	Senators	AP, SN (starter)
OF	Doc Cramer	Tigers	AP, SN (starter)
OF	Bob Johnson	Red Sox	AP, SN (starter)
OF	Hank Greenberg	Tigers	AP
OF	Jeff Heath	Indians	AP
OF	Wally Moses	White Sox	AP
OF	Roy Cullenbine	Tigers	SN
OF	Bobby Estalella	Athletics	SN

=== National League ===
Pitchers
Position	Player	Team	Selection
P	Hal Gregg	Dodgers	AP, SN (starter)
P	Mort Cooper	Braves	AP, SN
P	Red Barrett	Cardinals	AP, SN
P	Claude Passeau	Cubs	AP, SN
P	Preacher Roe	Pirates	AP, SN
P	Van Mungo	Giants	AP
P	Rip Sewell	Pirates	AP
P	Hank Wyse	Cubs	AP
P	Paul Derringer	Cubs	SN (starter)
P	Blix Donnelly	Cardinals	SN (starter)
P	Bill Voiselle	Giants	SN

Position Players
Position	Player	Team	Selection
C	Phil Masi	Braves	AP, SN (starter)
C	Ernie Lombardi	Giants	AP, SN
C	Ken O'Dea	Cardinals	AP, SN
1B	Phil Cavarretta	Cubs	AP, SN (starter)
1B	Frank McCormick	Reds	AP, SN
2B	Don Johnson	Cubs	AP, SN (starter)
2B	Emil Verban	Cardinals	AP, SN
3B	Whitey Kurowski	Cardinals	AP, SN (starter)
3B	Bob Elliott	Pirates	AP, SN
3B	Stan Hack	Cubs	AP
SS	Marty Marion	Cardinals	AP, SN (starter)
SS	Eddie Basinski	Dodgers	SN
OF	Tommy Holmes	Braves	AP, SN (starter)
OF	Mel Ott	Giants	AP, SN (starter)
OF	Bill Nicholson	Cubs	AP, SN (starter)
OF	Goody Rosen	Dodgers	AP, SN
OF	Andy Pafko	Cubs	AP
OF	Dixie Walker	Dodgers	AP
OF	Buster Adams	Cardinals	SN
OF	Vance Dinges	Phillies	SN

==== Note ====
Those selected for the Associated Press and or the Sporting News (Fred Lieb) All-Star rosters who had not been an official MLB All-Star before and after the 1945 season are:

- Associated Press: Oscar Grimes and Hank Wyse.
- The Sporting News (Fred Lieb): Buster Adams, Eddie Basinski, Mark Christman, Russ Christopher, Vance Dinges, Blix Donnelly, Bobby Estalela, and Roger Wolff.
- AP and TSN (Fred Lieb): Russ Christopher, Eddie Barrett, Nick Etten, Hal Gregg, Steve Gromek, Eddie Mayo, Ken O'Dea, Mike Tresh, and Goody Rosen,
