= Bob Muncrief =

American baseball player (1916–1996)

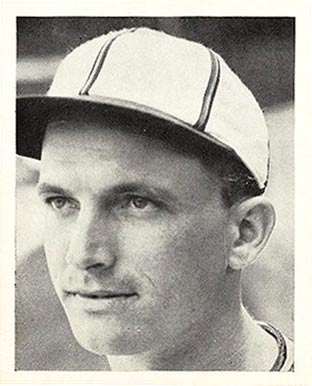
- Pitcher
- Born: January 28, 1916; Madill, Oklahoma, U.S.
- Died: February 6, 1996 (aged 80); Duncanville, Texas, U.S.
- Batted: Right Threw: Right

MLB debut
- September 30, 1937, for the St. Louis Browns

Last MLB appearance
- April 20, 1951, for the New York Yankees

MLB statistics
- Win–loss record: 80–82
- Earned run average: 3.80
- Strikeouts: 525
- Stats at Baseball Reference

Teams
- St. Louis Browns (1937, 1939, 1941–1947); Cleveland Indians (1948); Pittsburgh Pirates (1949); Chicago Cubs (1949); New York Yankees (1951)

Career highlights and awards
- All-Star (1944); World Series champion (1948)

Robert Cleveland Muncrief (January 28, 1916 – February 6, 1996) was an American professional baseball pitcher who appeared in 288 games in Major League Baseball over 12 seasons between 1937 and 1951 with the St. Louis Browns, Cleveland Indians, Pittsburgh Pirates, Chicago Cubs and New York Yankees. Born in Madill, Oklahoma, he batted and threw right-handed and was listed as 6 feet 2 inches (1.88 m) tall and 190 pounds (86 kg). He is perhaps best known as a key starting pitcher for the 1944 Browns, the only American League team from St. Louis to win a pennant. The following season, in 1945, Muncrief led all Junior Circuit hurlers in winning percentage, posting a .765 mark based on his 13–4 record.

== Baseball career ==
=== St. Louis Browns ===
Muncrief graduated from Ada High School and began his 22-year professional baseball career in 1934. He spent his maiden season in the Class C West Dixie League in the extensive minor-league system of St. Louis' dominant National League club, the Cardinals, but was acquired by the Browns in 1935; he promptly won 15 games for the Palestine Pals of the West Dixie circuit. Two years later, on September 30, 1937, Muncrief made his MLB debut starting for the Browns against the Detroit Tigers, allowing two runs (one earned) in two innings pitched. The lowly Browns won the game, 10–3, but the victory went to Julio Bonetti, who came on in the third inning and allowed only one run the rest of the way. Muncrief would make just two more appearances on the mound for the Browns (both in September 1939) until 1941.

In 1941—baseball's last pre-World War II season—Muncrief, still a rookie at age 25, began the year in the Brownie bullpen until getting four starting assignments in late May and early June. He joined the Browns' starting rotation for good in July, and ended up winning 13 games against eight losses, with 12 complete games and two shutouts and a respectable 3.65 earned run average. His 13 victories (for a team that won only 70 of its 154 games all year) were tied for tenth in the American League. In 1942, the Browns enjoyed their first over-.500 season since 1929, but Muncrief fell off to a 6–8 record. For each of the next three seasons (1943–1945), however, he would win 13 games for the Browns and compile stellar earned run averages. The 1943 Browns slumped to a 72–80, sixth-place season, but Muncrief notched another 12 complete games with three shutouts with a 2.81 earned run average.

Then, in 1944, Muncrief was an integral part of the Browns' only American League championship team. His 13 victories were tied for third on the pitching staff, he lost only eight, and his ERA was a solid 3.08 in 2191/3 innings pitched. He was selected to represent the American League in the 1944 Major League Baseball All-Star Game, played July 11 at Forbes Field, Pittsburgh. Muncrief tossed 11/3 scoreless innings in relief and allowed only one hit, but the National League took the contest, 7–1. The Browns went on to win 89 games during the regular season, one better than the second-place Tigers, to earn their first World Series berth. Pitted against their National League rivals, the Cardinals, in the all-St. Louis 1944 World Series, Muncrief was relegated to a relief role in his two appearances, each time replacing starter Nels Potter. In Game 2, he relieved Potter in the seventh inning of a 2–2 tie and allowed only one run over the next 41/3 innings, but he was out-dueled by Cardinals' relief pitcher Blix Donnelly and the Redbirds won 3–2, with Muncrief absorbing the loss. Then, in Game 6, he came in for Potter in the fourth inning. He quelled a Cardinal rally and threw two more shutout frames, but the NL champions had already forged an insurmountable 3–1 lead en route to the world championship.

In 1945, the Browns dropped back to third place with an 81–70–3 record, but Muncrief paced the American League with his .765 winning percentage. He finished 22nd in voting for the 1945 American League Most Valuable Player Award for his 13–4 won–lost record, ten complete games and 2.72 ERA. He also spent parts of the 1944 and 1945 seasons away from the Browns, working in a war-related factory.

The first two postwar seasons, 1946 and 1947, were disappointing for the Browns, who lost a combined 183 games, and Muncrief, who won only 11 contests, lost 26, and saw his ERA balloon to two runs over his 1945 standard. He was traded to the Cleveland Indians in November 1947.

=== With 1948 champion Cleveland Indians ===
In 1948, Muncrief joined a Cleveland staff headed by Baseball Hall of Famers Bob Feller and Bob Lemon and rookie sensation Gene Bearden. Pitching infrequently as both a starter and reliever during the campaign's first three months, he lowered his earned run average to 1.58 on June 26 after a three-hit shutout of the Washington Senators improved his won–lost mark to 5–1. However, he was ineffective over the remainder of the regular season, dropping his final three decisions and seeing his earned run average rise to 3.98. Still, his Indians prevailed in a furious pennant race, finishing in a dead heat with the Boston Red Sox at season's end, and then humbling the Bosox 8–3 in the 1948 American League tie-breaker game at Fenway Park on October 4, behind Bearden's complete game. In the 1948 World Series that followed, Muncrief again worked in relief, tossing two more scoreless innings against the Boston Braves in Game 5. The following day, October 11, the Indians won their second-ever world championship.

=== Late career ===
The Indians sold Muncrief's contract to the Pittsburgh Pirates in November 1948. He went 1–5 with the Pirates and was relegated to the bullpen before being claimed off waivers by the Chicago Cubs on June 6, 1949. He posted a mediocre 6–11 record and 5.12 earned run average in 47 games in his only National League season. He then spent all of 1950 in the Triple-A Pacific Coast League, where he won 15 games and earned his final MLB opportunity as a Rule 5 selection of the New York Yankees. He worked in only two games and three total innings for the 1951 Yankees before being sent down at the May cutdown, and spent his last five pro seasons back in the minor leagues.

In his 12 major-league seasons and 288 games pitched, Bob Muncrief had an 80–82 win–loss record, 67 complete games, 11 shutouts, nine saves, and a 3.80 career earned run average. In 1,4011/3 innings pitched he allowed 1,503 hits and 392 bases on balls, with 525 strikeouts. In three career World Series games, he worked a total of 82/3 innings and allowed only one run (on six hits and four bases on balls) for an earned run average of 1.04. However, that run—tallied by the Cardinals in the bottom of the 11th inning of Game 2 of the 1944 Fall Classic—earned Muncrief his only World Series decision, a defeat.

He died in Duncanville, Texas, at the age of 80.
