= Earl Jones (pitcher) =

American baseball player (1919-1989)

- Pitcher
- Born: June 11, 1919; Fresno, California, U.S.
- Died: January 24, 1989 (aged 69); Fresno, California, U.S.
- Batted: Left Threw: Left

MLB debut
- July 6, 1945, for the St. Louis Browns

Last MLB appearance
- September 24, 1945, for the St. Louis Browns

MLB statistics
- Win–loss record: 0–0
- Earned run average: 2.54
- Strikeouts: 13
- Stats at Baseball Reference

Teams
- St. Louis Browns (1945)

Earl Leslie "Lefty" Jones (June 11, 1919 – January 24, 1989) was an American Major League Baseball pitcher who played for the St. Louis Browns in 1945.
