= Milt Byrnes =

American baseball player (1916-1979)

- Outfielder
- Born: November 15, 1916; St. Louis, Missouri, U.S.
- Died: February 1, 1979 (aged 62); St. Louis, Missouri, U.S.
- Batted: Left Threw: Left

MLB debut
- April 21, 1943, for the St. Louis Browns

Last MLB appearance
- September 30, 1945, for the St. Louis Browns

MLB statistics
- Batting average: .274
- Home runs: 16
- Runs batted in: 154
- Stats at Baseball Reference

Teams
- St. Louis Browns (1943–1945)

Milton John "Skippy" Byrnes (November 15, 1916 – February 1, 1979) was an American outfielder in Major League Baseball. He played for the St. Louis Browns from 1943 to 1945.

In three major league seasons, Byrnes posted a .274 batting average (350-for-1278) with 174 runs, 16 home runs, 154 RBI and 199 bases on balls. He finished his career with a .987 fielding percentage playing at all three outfield positions.
