= Tommy Holmes =

American baseball player and manager

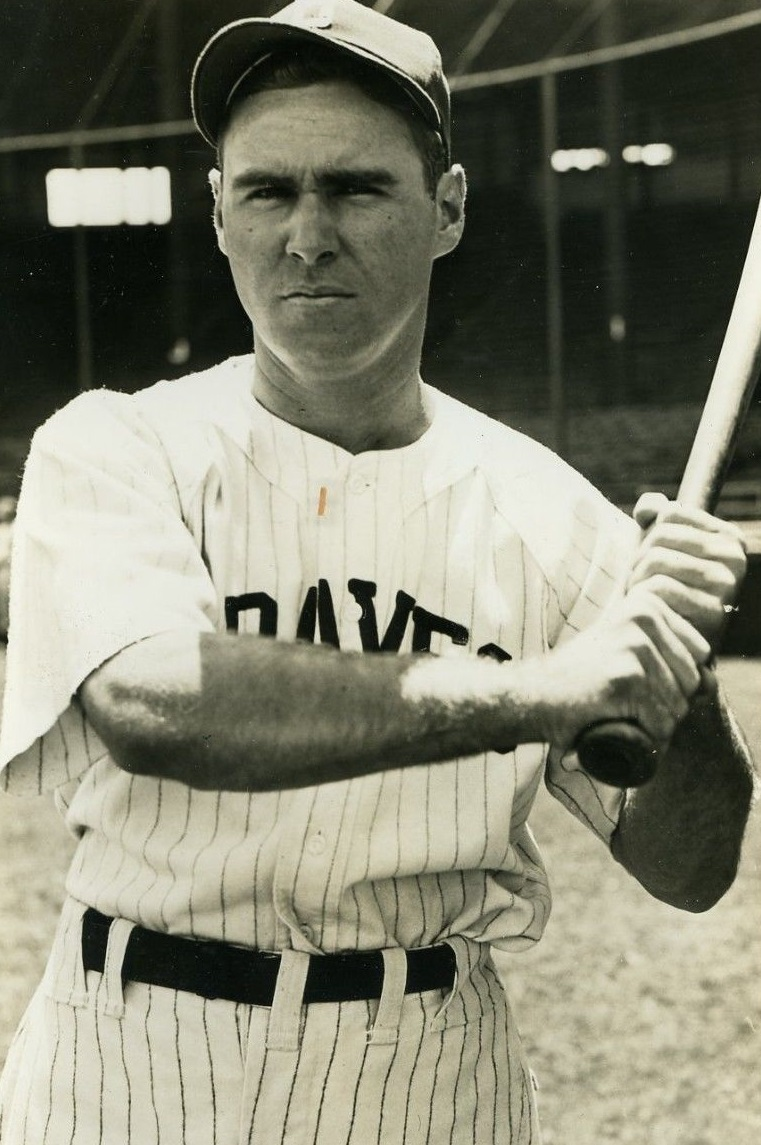
- Holmes with the Boston Braves
- Outfielder / Manager
- Born: March 29, 1917; Brooklyn, New York, U.S.
- Died: April 14, 2008 (aged 91); Boca Raton, Florida, U.S.
- Batted: Left Threw: Left

MLB debut
- April 14, 1942, for the Boston Braves

Last MLB appearance
- September 28, 1952, for the Brooklyn Dodgers

MLB statistics
- Batting average: .302
- Home runs: 88
- Runs batted in: 581
- Managerial record: 61–69
- Winning %: .469
- Stats at Baseball Reference

Teams
- As player: Boston Braves (1942–1951); Brooklyn Dodgers (1952); As manager: Boston Braves (1951–1952)

Career highlights and awards
- 2× All-Star (1945, 1948); NL home run leader (1945); Braves Hall of Fame

Thomas Francis Holmes (March 29, 1917 – April 14, 2008) was an American right and center fielder and manager in Major League Baseball who played nearly his entire career for the Boston Braves. He hit over .300 lifetime (.302) and every year from 1944 through 1948, peaking with a .352 mark in 1945 when he finished second in the National League batting race and was runner-up for the NL's Most Valuable Player Award.

== Career ==
Holmes was born in Brooklyn, New York. As a youth, he trained to be a boxer but his father forbade him to pursue the sport professionally. He attended Brooklyn Technical High School where he had batting averages of .613 and .585 in various seasons, attracting the attention of major league scouts. As a high schooler, Holmes also played semiprofessional games on Sundays for $5 per game (equivalent to $121.45 in 2024).

Holmes, who batted and threw left-handed, signed his first professional contract with the New York Yankees, but could not break into their outfield of Joe DiMaggio, Tommy Henrich and Charlie Keller. After three over-.300 seasons with the Yanks' top farm team, the Newark Bears, he was traded to the Boston Braves in February 1942. Given a regular major league job at last, he hit over .300 for five consecutive seasons (1944–48).

In 1944, Holmes was deemed ineligible for service in World War II due to an untreatable sinus condition.

Holmes, one of the most popular Boston Braves especially in the twilight of his career, finished second in MVP voting in the National League in 1945 after leading the NL in hits (224), home runs (28) and doubles (47). That season, he set a modern NL record by hitting safely in 37 consecutive games from June 6 through July 8 (Bill Dahlen and Willie Keeler had longer streaks in the 1890s), a mark surpassed 33 years later in 1978 by Pete Rose with a 44-game streak that tied Keeler's and came the closest to Joe DiMaggio's MLB record 56 in 1941. Holmes struck out just 9 times in 1945, and his ratio of home runs (28) to strikeouts that season is one of the best in baseball history.

In 1948, his .325 batting average in 139 games as the Braves' leadoff hitter help lead Boston to the NL pennant (together with slugging MVP third baseman Bob Elliott and the oft-parodied starting rotation of Spahn, Sain and pray for rain).

After the 1950 season Holmes, at 33, was named player-manager of the team's Class A Hartford Chiefs farm club. On June 19, 1951, with the injury-ridden parent club Braves floundering in fifth place under manager Billy Southworth, he was called back to Boston to manage his old team and serve as a pinch-hitter. It was hoped he could arouse the club and bring fans back to Braves Field. The team went 48–47 under Holmes for the remainder of 1951, finishing fourth as they did in 1949 and 1950, but when they began 1952 with a mark of 13–22 he was fired on May 31 and replaced by Charlie Grimm. The Braves finished seventh, drew only 281,000 fans, and left Boston for Milwaukee the following spring. That 61–69 stretch (.469) was Holmes' only major league managing stint.

Holmes finished the regular 1952 season pinch-hitting for the Brooklyn Dodgers and playing left field in the final inning of game 7 in the World Series against the New York Yankees, after which he managed in the Braves' and Dodgers' farm systems from 1953 to 1957. He retired with a .302 lifetime batting average with 88 home runs and 581 RBIs in his 1,320-game, eleven-year major league career. He posted a fine .989 fielding percentage in the majors, never committing more than 6 errors in any one season (1945), and executing more double plays (37) than errors (33).

In 1973, he returned to the game as director of amateur baseball relations for the New York Mets, a post he held for three decades until retiring at 86.

Holmes died in 2008 at the age of 91 in Boca Raton, Florida.

== See also ==
- List of Major League Baseball player–managers
