= Hal Epps =

American baseball player (1914–2004)

- Outfielder
- Born: March 26, 1914; Athens, Georgia
- Died: August 25, 2004 (aged 90); Houston, Texas
- Batted: Left Threw: Left

MLB debut
- September 9, 1938, for the St. Louis Cardinals

Last MLB appearance
- September 20, 1944

MLB statistics
- Games: 125
- Home Runs: 1
- Batting average: .253
- Stats at Baseball Reference

Teams
- St. Louis Cardinals (1938, 1940); St. Louis Browns (1943–1944); Philadelphia Athletics (1944)

Harold Franklin "Hal" Epps (March 26, 1914 – August 25, 2004) was an outfielder for the St. Louis Cardinals, St. Louis Browns, and Philadelphia Athletics.

Although he only spent parts of four seasons in the majors, Epps had an 18-year professional baseball career. He compiled a .300 minor league average and led the Texas League in triples three times (1938, 1938, and 1947).

When his playing days were over, he managed semi-pro teams and then worked for many years for Armco Steel. During and after World War II, Epps served two years in the 25th Infantry Division, spending time in both the Philippines and Japan and leaving the service as a technician fourth grade. Upon his death, he was buried at the Houston National Cemetery.
