= Len Schulte =

American baseball player (1916–1986)

- Infielder
- Born: December 5, 1916; St. Charles, Missouri, U.S.
- Died: May 6, 1986 (aged 69); Orlando, Florida, U.S.
- Batted: Right Threw: Right

MLB debut
- September 27, 1944, for the St. Louis Browns

Last MLB appearance
- June 16, 1946, for the St. Louis Browns

MLB statistics
- Batting average: .248
- Home runs: 0
- Runs batted in: 38
- Stats at Baseball Reference

Teams
- St. Louis Browns (1944–1946)

Leonard Bernard Schulte, born Schultehenrich (December 5, 1916 – May 6, 1986), was an American professional baseball player. An infielder, his playing career lasted for 13 seasons (1937–1949), including 124 games over all or parts of three seasons (1944–1946) in the Major Leagues for the St. Louis Browns. The native of St. Charles, Missouri, attended the University of Iowa. He threw and batted right-handed, stood 5 feet 10 inches (1.78 m) tall and weighed 160 pounds (73 kg).

All but five games in Schulte's Major League career occurred during the 1945 season. Spending the entire season on the St. Louis roster, he appeared in 119 games, 71 as a third baseman, and he batted .247 in 430 at bats. Altogether, he collected 108 hits with the Browns, including 16 doubles and one triple.

He was a manager in minor league baseball in 1941, before his MLB career began, and then from 1950 to 1952 in the Browns' and Cincinnati Reds' organizations. An older brother, Ham, also an infielder, played one season in the majors with the 1940 Philadelphia Phillies.
