= 1944 World Series =

1944 Major League Baseball championship series

| Team (Wins) | Managers | Season |
|---|---|---|
| St. Louis Cardinals (4) | Billy Southworth | 105–49, .682, GA: 14 1/2 |
| St. Louis Browns (2) | Luke Sewell | 89–65, .578, GA: 1 |
- Dates: October 4–9
- Venue: Sportsman's Park
- Umpires: Ziggy Sears (NL), Bill McGowan (AL), Tom Dunn (NL), George Pipgras (AL)
- Hall of Famers: Umpire: Bill McGowan; Cardinals: Billy Southworth (manager); Enos Slaughter; Stan Musial; Browns: none

Broadcast
- Radio: Mutual
- Radio announcers: Don Dunphy and Bill Slater

The 1944 World Series was the championship series in Major League Baseball for the 1944 season. The 41st edition of the World Series, it was an all-St. Louis affair matching the St. Louis Cardinals and St. Louis Browns at Sportsman's Park. It marked the third time in World Series history in which both teams had the same home field (the others being the 1921 and 1922 Series, both played at the Polo Grounds in New York City). It would be 76 years before another World Series had all of its games played in a single ballpark: the 2020 Series used Globe Life Field in Arlington, Texas as a neutral site due to health concerns regarding the COVID-19 pandemic.

1944 saw perhaps the nadir of 20th-century baseball, as the long-moribund St. Louis Browns won their only American League pennant. Some of the players were 4-Fs, rejected by the military for physical defects (one armed Pete Gray wound up playing major league baseball the following year) or limitations that precluded duty. Others divided their time between factory work in defense industries and baseball, some being able to play ball only on weekends. Some players avoided the draft by chance, despite being physically able to serve. Stan Musial of the Cardinals was one. Musial, enlisting in early 1945, missed one season. He rejoined the Cardinals in 1946.

As both teams called Sportsman's Park home, the traditional 2–3–2 home field assignment was used (instead of the wartime 3–4). The Junior World Series of that same year, partly hosted in Baltimore's converted football stadium, easily outdrew the "real" Series and attracted attention to Baltimore as a potential major league city. Ten years later, the Browns relocated there and became the Orioles. The Orioles would go on to win the 1966 World Series, becoming the last of the AL's eight charter franchises to do so. Another all-Missouri World Series was played 41 years later, with the Kansas City Royals defeating the Cardinals in seven games.

The Series was also known as the "Trolley Series," "Streetcar Series," or the "St. Louis Showdown." Coincidentally, this World Series was played the same year Metro-Goldwyn-Mayer released the musical film Meet Me in St. Louis. It remains one of two World Series played that featured two teams from the same city other than New York; the other was the 1906 World Series between the two Chicago teams. The 1989 World Series featured two teams from the San Francisco metropolitan area, but not the same city. It was also the first World Series in which both teams played west of the Mississippi River.

This is currently the earliest World Series in which one of the teams (St. Louis Browns), has had no personnel eventually elected to the Hall of Fame.

To date, the St. Louis Cardinals of 1942, 1943, and 1944 are the most recent National League team to appear in the World Series in three consecutive seasons.

This is the only World Series to date in which neither team was credited with a stolen base.

This would also be the final World Series where Kenesaw Mountain Landis was the commissioner of baseball. Landis died six weeks later on November 25.

This was the only time the Baltimore Orioles franchise made the World Series (and by extension the postseason) while based in St. Louis. The next time they did either was in 1966, by which time the franchise had relocated to Baltimore.

== Background ==
Many of the game's best players were called away for World War II, and the result was a seriously depleted pool of talent.

The top team in the American League was the perennial-doormat Browns, who collectively hit .252 en route to their only pennant in 52 seasons in St. Louis. They only had one .300 hitter in outfielder Mike Kreevich (who barely made it at .301), one man — shortstop Vern Stephens — who hit 20 home runs and drove in more than 85 runs (Stephens led the AL with 109 RBI).

On the mound, the Browns boasted Nels Potter and Jack Kramer, who combined for 36 victories. The team squeaked into first place by winning 11 out of their final 12 games, including the last 4 in a row over the defending champion New York Yankees. The last victory, combined with Detroit's loss to Washington, enabled St. Louis to finish one game ahead of the Tigers in the American League.

Their 89–65 record would be the worst for an AL champion until the Minnesota Twins won the pennant in 1987 with a record of 85–77 (coincidentally, defeating Detroit to win the pennant).

On the other side of Sportsman's Park, it was business as usual for the Cardinals. The team won 105 games en route to their third-straight National League pennant, finishing 14 1/2 games in front of the Pittsburgh Pirates. Manager Billy Southworth's Cardinals ran their three-year victory total to 316.

The Cardinals were the first National League franchise with three consecutive 100-win seasons. The 1944 team featured league MVP Marty Marion and future Hall of Famer Stan Musial.

== Summary ==
NL St. Louis Cardinals (4) vs. AL St. Louis Browns (2)

| Game | Date | Score | Location | Time | Attendance |
|---|---|---|---|---|---|
| 1 | October 4 | St. Louis Browns – 2, St. Louis Cardinals – 1 | Sportsman's Park | 2:05 | 33,242 |
| 2 | October 5 | St. Louis Browns – 2, St. Louis Cardinals – 3 (11) | Sportsman's Park | 2:32 | 35,076 |
| 3 | October 6 | St. Louis Cardinals – 2, St. Louis Browns – 6 | Sportsman's Park | 2:19 | 34,737 |
| 4 | October 7 | St. Louis Cardinals – 5, St. Louis Browns – 1 | Sportsman's Park | 2:22 | 35,455 |
| 5 | October 8 | St. Louis Cardinals – 2, St. Louis Browns – 0 | Sportsman's Park | 2:04 | 36,568 |
| 6 | October 9 | St. Louis Browns – 1, St. Louis Cardinals – 3 | Sportsman's Park | 2:06 | 31,630 |

== Matchups ==
=== Game 1 ===
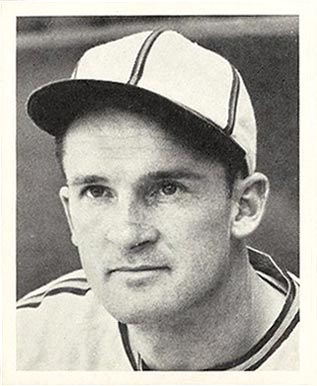
George McQuinn

Wednesday, October 4, 1944 2:00 pm (CT) at Sportsman's Park in St. Louis, Missouri
| Team | 1 | 2 | 3 | 4 | 5 | 6 | 7 | 8 | 9 | R | H | E |
|---|---|---|---|---|---|---|---|---|---|---|---|---|
| St. Louis (AL) | 0 | 0 | 0 | 2 | 0 | 0 | 0 | 0 | 0 | 2 | 2 | 0 |
| St. Louis (NL) | 0 | 0 | 0 | 0 | 0 | 0 | 0 | 0 | 1 | 1 | 7 | 0 |
WP: Denny Galehouse (1–0) LP: Mort Cooper (0–1); Home runs: SLB: George McQuinn (1); SLC: None

For the first game of the series, Mort Cooper of the Cardinals was matched against Denny Galehouse of the Browns. While the Cardinals left nine runners on base, they managed just one run off Galehouse, who went the distance as the Browns managed to win despite having just five baserunners (two hits, three walks) for the entire game. In the fourth inning, Gene Moore lined a two-out single before George McQuinn hit a shot to right for a home run (his only one of the Series) to give the Browns a 2–0 lead. In the 9th, Marty Marion hit a leadoff double for the Cardinals before being advanced on a groundout and later scored when Ken O'Dea hit a sacrifice fly; Johnny Hopp subsequently flied out to center to end the game. This was the first World Series game in history where the winning team had less than three hits for the entire game.

=== Game 2 ===
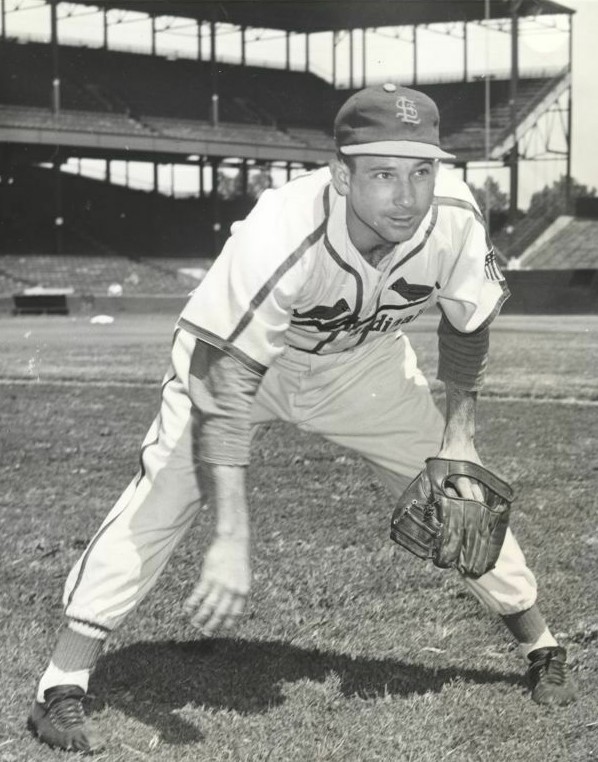
Blix Donnelly

Thursday, October 5, 1944 2:00 pm (CT) at Sportsman's Park in St. Louis, Missouri
| Team | 1 | 2 | 3 | 4 | 5 | 6 | 7 | 8 | 9 | 10 | 11 | R | H | E |
|---|---|---|---|---|---|---|---|---|---|---|---|---|---|---|
| St. Louis (AL) | 0 | 0 | 0 | 0 | 0 | 0 | 2 | 0 | 0 | 0 | 0 | 2 | 7 | 4 |
| St. Louis (NL) | 0 | 0 | 1 | 1 | 0 | 0 | 0 | 0 | 0 | 0 | 1 | 3 | 7 | 0 |
WP: Blix Donnelly (1–0) LP: Bob Muncrief (0–1)

Nels Potter of the Browns was matched against Max Lanier in a game that saw both pitchers knocked out by the eighth inning. The Cardinals drew first blood in the third inning; Emil Verban led the inning off with a single before Lanier tried a sacrifice bunt that plopped in front of home for the pitcher, but his throw to first was wife and both runners were safe. Augie Bergamo grounded out to second that scored Verban from third. In the fourth, Verban drove in the second run of the game on a sacrifice fly (which had been preceded by another Browns error). The Browns tied the game in the seventh with a two-out rally, as Gene Moore hit a single before Red Hayworth drove him home on a double to the wall that was soon followed by Frank Mancuso hitting a line drive single.

The final innings was a bullpen showdown, with the Browns bringing in Bob Muncrief in the seventh inning and the Cardinals bringing in Blix Donnelly in the eighth. In the 11th inning, the Cardinals saw Ray Sanders deliver a leadoff single before being advanced to second base on a groundout bunt. The Browns intentionally walked Marty Marion to pitch to Ken O'Dea, inserted into the game as a pinch-hitter in the 8-spot. He hit a line drive to right that scored Sanders from second to end the game that saw the series evened at one game apiece. It was the first game-ending postseason hit (now commonly referred to as a "walkoff" hit) in Cardinals history.

=== Game 3 ===
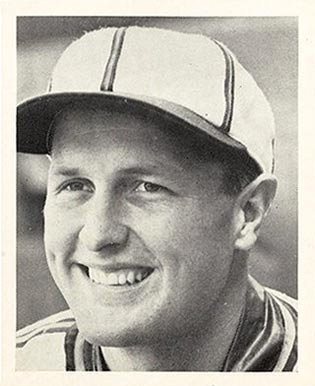
Jack Kramer

Friday, October 6, 1944 2:00 pm (CT) at Sportsman's Park in St. Louis, Missouri
| Team | 1 | 2 | 3 | 4 | 5 | 6 | 7 | 8 | 9 | R | H | E |
|---|---|---|---|---|---|---|---|---|---|---|---|---|
| St. Louis (NL) | 1 | 0 | 0 | 0 | 0 | 0 | 1 | 0 | 0 | 2 | 7 | 0 |
| St. Louis (AL) | 0 | 0 | 4 | 0 | 0 | 0 | 2 | 0 | X | 6 | 8 | 2 |
WP: Jack Kramer (1–0) LP: Ted Wilks (0–1)

With the Browns now serving as host for the third game of the Series, they sent out Jack Kramer while the Cardinals sent out Ted Wilks. The Cardinals used four pitchers in the game while Kramer struck out ten batters in a complete game performance that saw him allow two runs, each unearned. The Cardinals struck first when Vern Stephens couldn't field a clean ground ball that saw the runner get to second base before a subsequent Walker Cooper single gave them a 1–0 lead. The Browns stuck back in the third inning on five hits, all of them coming with two outs, with George McQuinn, Al Zarilla, and Mark Christman all delivering RBI singles. Kramer helped his case by not swinging the bat when a pitch went wildly past the catcher to score a run in from third base as the Browns took a 4–1 lead into the third inning. The Cardinals came closer in the 7th on a Marty Marion single, but the Browns responded in the bottom frame with two runs of their own. Vern Stephens saw a ball pass him by on a walk that scored a runner from third before McQuinn delivered an RBI double to close out the scoring.

This wound up being the last victory in a World Series game for the Browns franchise prior to their relocation to become the Baltimore Orioles (in turn, the Orioles did not win a World Series game until 1966).

=== Game 4 ===
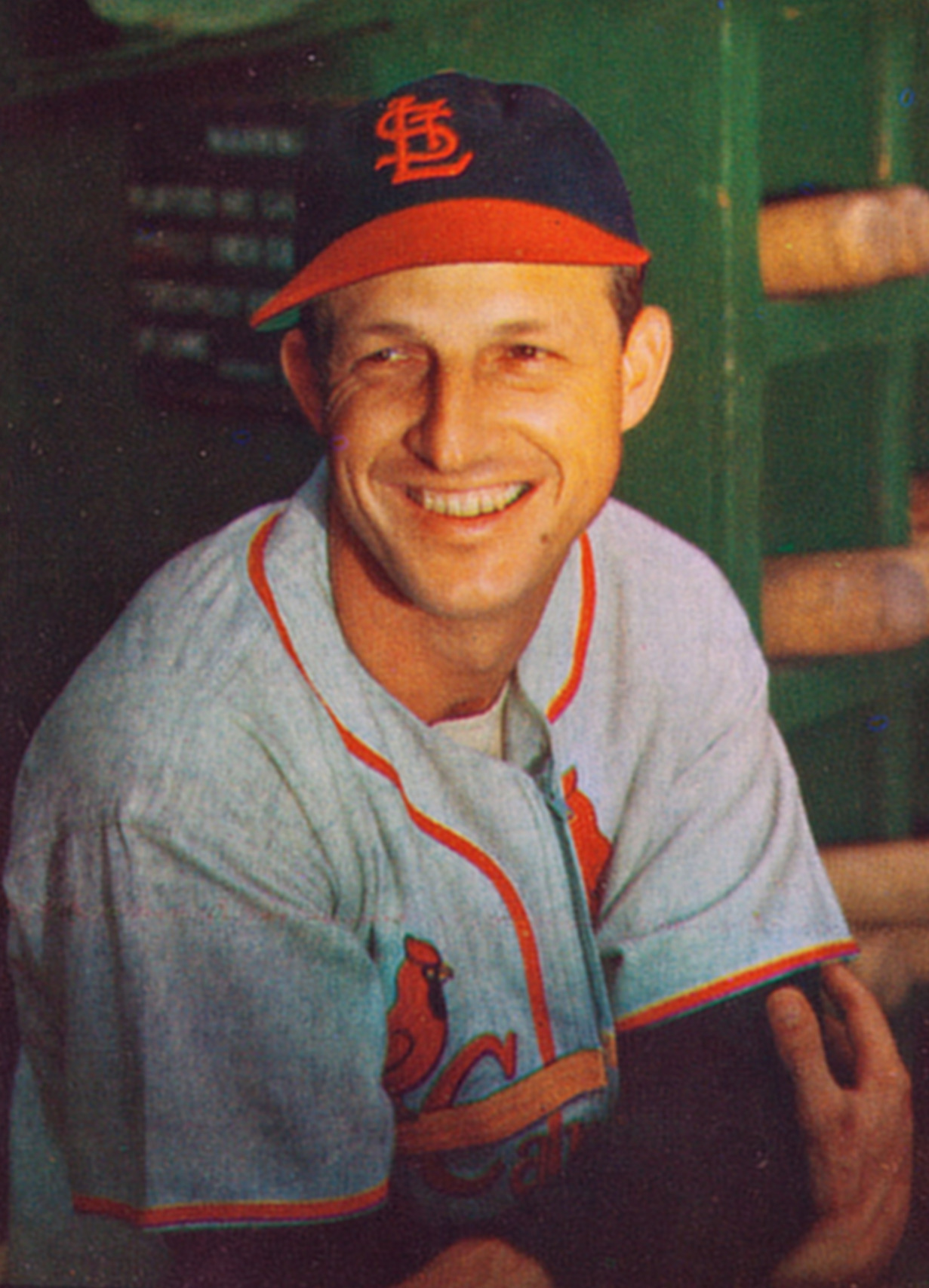
Stan Musial

Saturday, October 7, 1944 2:00 pm (CT) at Sportsman's Park in St. Louis, Missouri
| Team | 1 | 2 | 3 | 4 | 5 | 6 | 7 | 8 | 9 | R | H | E |
|---|---|---|---|---|---|---|---|---|---|---|---|---|
| St. Louis (NL) | 2 | 0 | 2 | 0 | 0 | 1 | 0 | 0 | 0 | 5 | 12 | 0 |
| St. Louis (AL) | 0 | 0 | 0 | 0 | 0 | 0 | 0 | 1 | 0 | 1 | 9 | 1 |
WP: Harry Brecheen (1–0) LP: Sig Jakucki (0–1); Home runs: SLC: Stan Musial (1); SLB: None

Browns starter Sig Jakucki had been away from baseball for five years, but returned to win 13 games in 1944. He lasted only three innings giving up four runs. Stan Musial hit a two-run homer in the first, and the Browns never recovered. Harry Brecheen went the distance for the win despite giving up nine hits and four walks.

=== Game 5 ===
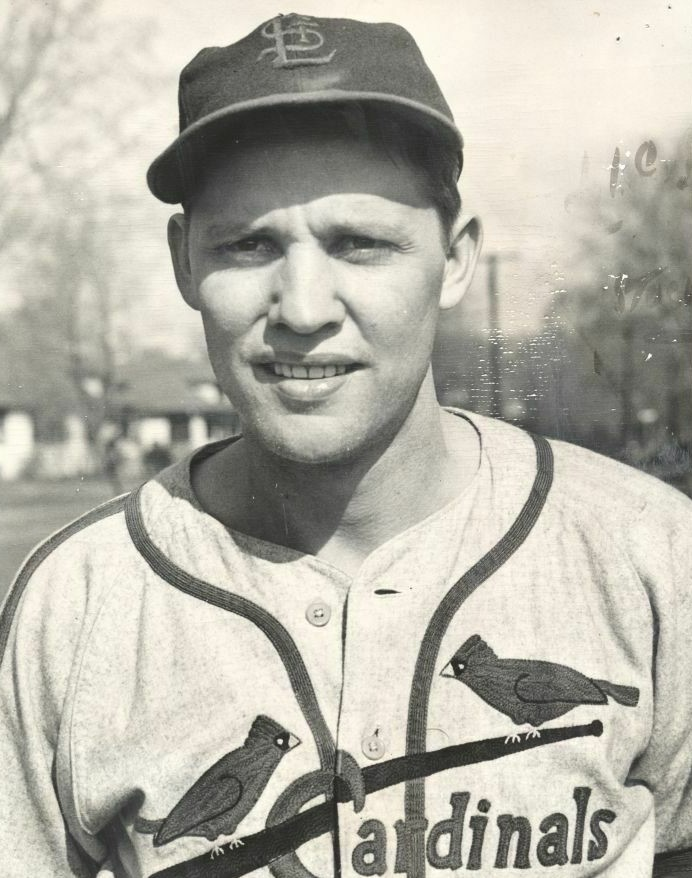
Ray Sanders

Sunday, October 8, 1944 2:00 pm (CT) at Sportsman's Park in St. Louis, Missouri
| Team | 1 | 2 | 3 | 4 | 5 | 6 | 7 | 8 | 9 | R | H | E |
|---|---|---|---|---|---|---|---|---|---|---|---|---|
| St. Louis (NL) | 0 | 0 | 0 | 0 | 0 | 1 | 0 | 1 | 0 | 2 | 6 | 1 |
| St. Louis (AL) | 0 | 0 | 0 | 0 | 0 | 0 | 0 | 0 | 0 | 0 | 7 | 1 |
WP: Mort Cooper (1–1) LP: Denny Galehouse (1–1); Home runs: SLC: Ray Sanders (1), Danny Litwhiler (1); SLB: None

Mort Cooper recovered from his opening game loss to beat Galehouse with a seven-hit, 2–0 shutout. In the Cardinals' 1942–1944 stranglehold on the National League championship, Cooper had won 65 games and thrown 23 shutouts. Ray Sanders and Danny Litwhiler scored the game's two only runs by hitting one solo home run each, in the sixth and the eighth inning.

=== Game 6 ===
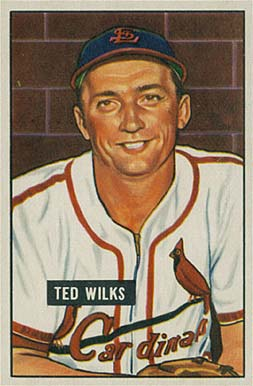
Ted Wilks

Monday, October 9, 1944 2:00 pm (CT) at Sportsman's Park in St. Louis, Missouri
| Team | 1 | 2 | 3 | 4 | 5 | 6 | 7 | 8 | 9 | R | H | E |
|---|---|---|---|---|---|---|---|---|---|---|---|---|
| St. Louis (AL) | 0 | 1 | 0 | 0 | 0 | 0 | 0 | 0 | 0 | 1 | 3 | 2 |
| St. Louis (NL) | 0 | 0 | 0 | 3 | 0 | 0 | 0 | 0 | X | 3 | 10 | 0 |
WP: Max Lanier (1–0) LP: Nels Potter (0–1) Sv: Ted Wilks (1)

With the city on the brink of seeing a champion crowned, the Cardinals sent out Max Lanier to pitch against Nels Potter. The Browns drew first blood after Chet Laabs hit a one-out triple before George McQuinn hit a ground ball single to give them a 1–0 lead after two innings. The next four innings saw plenty of baserunners and missed opportunities, but the Cardinals made the most of it in the 4th inning, which saw Walker Cooper and Ray Sanders draw a walk and single to set up Whitey Kurowski with one out. He hit a groundball to shortstop Vern Stephens, but his throw to Don Gutteridge at second pulled him off the bag that saw everyone safe on a fielder's choice and error charged to Stephens. Potter got the second out soon after, but Emil Verban and Lanier each delivered RBI singles to give St. Louis the lead. In the sixth inning, Lanier was pulled after the Browns drew consecutive walks with one out that saw Ted Wilks appear in relief. With runners on second and third, Mark Christman hit into a fielder's choice that resulted in the second out before Red Hayworth flied out to close the threat. Wilks faced a total of eleven batters and retired all of them; Wilks struck out Mike Chartak (in what proved to be his final at-bat of his career) for the final out of the game and the series.

It was the second championship for the Cardinals in a span of three years and their fifth overall title.

== Composite line score ==
1944 World Series (4–2): St. Louis Cardinals (N.L.) over St. Louis Browns (A.L.)

| Team | 1 | 2 | 3 | 4 | 5 | 6 | 7 | 8 | 9 | 10 | 11 | R | H | E |
|---|---|---|---|---|---|---|---|---|---|---|---|---|---|---|
| St. Louis Cardinals | 3 | 0 | 3 | 4 | 0 | 2 | 1 | 1 | 1 | 0 | 1 | 16 | 49 | 1 |
| St. Louis Browns | 0 | 1 | 4 | 2 | 0 | 0 | 4 | 1 | 0 | 0 | 0 | 12 | 36 | 10 |
Total attendance: 206,708 Average attendance: 34,451; Winning player's share: $4,626 Losing player's share: $2,744

== See also ==
- 1944 Negro World Series
- St. Louis baseball rivalry
