= Lefty West =

American baseball player (1915-1979)

- Pitcher
- Born: September 3, 1915; Gibsonville, North Carolina, U.S.
- Died: July 23, 1979 (aged 63); Hendersonville, North Carolina, U.S.
- Batted: Right Threw: Left

MLB debut
- April 30, 1944, for the St. Louis Browns

Last MLB appearance
- September 15, 1945, for the St. Louis Browns

MLB statistics
- Win–loss record: 3–4
- Earned run average: 4.29
- Strikeouts: 49
- Stats at Baseball Reference

Teams
- St. Louis Browns (1944–1945)

Weldon Edison "Lefty" West (September 3, 1915 – July 23, 1979) was an American Major League Baseball pitcher who played for the St. Louis Browns in 1944 and 1945.

West made his big-league debut on April 30, 1944 at the age of 28. He spent 11 games with the Browns that season, posting a 0–0 record with a 6.29 ERA. In 24 1/3 innings, he allowed 34 hits and 19 walks while striking out 11 batters.

In 1945, he appeared in 24 games, starting eight of them. He posted a record of 3–4 with an ERA of 3.63, allowing 71 hits in 74 1/3 innings of work while walking 31 batters and striking out 38. He appeared in his final big league game on September 15, 1945.

Overall, West went 3–4 with a 4.29 ERA in 35 major league games. In 98 2/3 innings, he allowed 105 hits, three home runs and 50 walks while striking out 49 batters. As a batter, he hit .088 in 34 at-bats.

West also spent nine seasons in the minor leagues, going 59–94 in 193 games. In 1,412 innings, he allowed 1,376 hits and 607 strikeouts. With the Americus Pioneers in 1939, West went 19–11 with a 2.91 ERA. Though he allowed 139 runs in 294 innings of work that year, only 95 of them were earned.

In 1940, he and his wife were living in Kernersville, North Carolina. Following his death, he was interred at Forest Lawn Memorial Park in Hendersonville.
