= Babe Martin =

American baseball player (1920–2013)

- Left fielder / First baseman / Catcher
- Born: March 28, 1920; Seattle, Washington, U.S.
- Died: August 1, 2013 (aged 93); Tucson, Arizona, U.S.
- Batted: Right Threw: Right

MLB debut
- September 25, 1944, for the St. Louis Browns

Last MLB appearance
- July 1, 1953, for the St. Louis Browns

MLB statistics
- Batting average: .214
- Home runs: 2
- Runs batted in: 18
- Stats at Baseball Reference

Teams
- St. Louis Browns (1944–1946); Boston Red Sox (1948–1949); St. Louis Browns (1953)

Boris Michael Martin (March 28, 1920 – August 1, 2013) was an American Major League Baseball outfielder for the St. Louis Browns (1944–46 and 1953) and a catcher for the Boston Red Sox (1948–49). He was nicknamed 'Babe'.

== Early life ==
Martin was born Boris Michael Martinovich on March 28, 1920, in Seattle, Washington, to Serbian immigrant parents. The Martinovich family then moved to Zeigler, Illinois, when Babe was a boy, and subsequently moved to St. Louis, Missouri after the death of Babe's father. He attended and played baseball at McKinley High School in St. Louis.

== Career ==
He started his professional baseball career in 1940 and had a breakout year in 1944 with the Toledo Mud Hens, batting .350 in 114 games. The following season, he joined the Major League Browns. He hit poorly and was sent back down to the minors. Martin retired in 1954. In 69 Major League games, he had 2 home runs, 18 RBIs, and a .214 batting average.

In later years, Martin still held a grudge against one-armed outfielder Pete Gray, who was a teammate in 1945. "The worst thing that happened to our ballclub in 1945, which we should have won the pennant, was Pete Gray", he said. "And honestly I think if we hadn't had Pete ... we could have won the pennant in 1945." Although Martin's batting average that season was actually 18 points lower than Gray's, Martin was referring to Pete Gray's fielding ability. Because Gray only had one arm, his throws back into the infield were slowed because he had to remove his glove from his one hand, get the ball, and throw into the infield. This slowed him down and allowed runners to advance more easily than they otherwise would have. The Browns finished in third place in the American League, six games behind the Detroit Tigers.

Charlie Metro was Martin's teammate during Martin's lone season with the Oakland Oaks in 1946. He shared this anecdote: "Babe Martin came to us out from St. Louis. He was in the Browns organization at one time, and I knew him from that. He was a catcher. We were playing in Portland one day when some leather-lunged fan was giving him a good roasting. Portland had a dugout that sloped down kind of like a sunken shed. Babe had taken just about all that he could take from this heckler who was sitting right up there, and he took a running start and jumped up on the roof of the dugout, scrambling up, crawling up, wanting to get the guy, shin guards, mask, and all. He was going to get him, but he couldn't make it. He kept sliding down. Finally somebody grabbed him by his shoes and pulled him back down. He later became a councilperson or something in St. Louis."

== Death ==
Martin died on August 1, 2013.
