= Ellis Clary =

American baseball player (1916-2000)

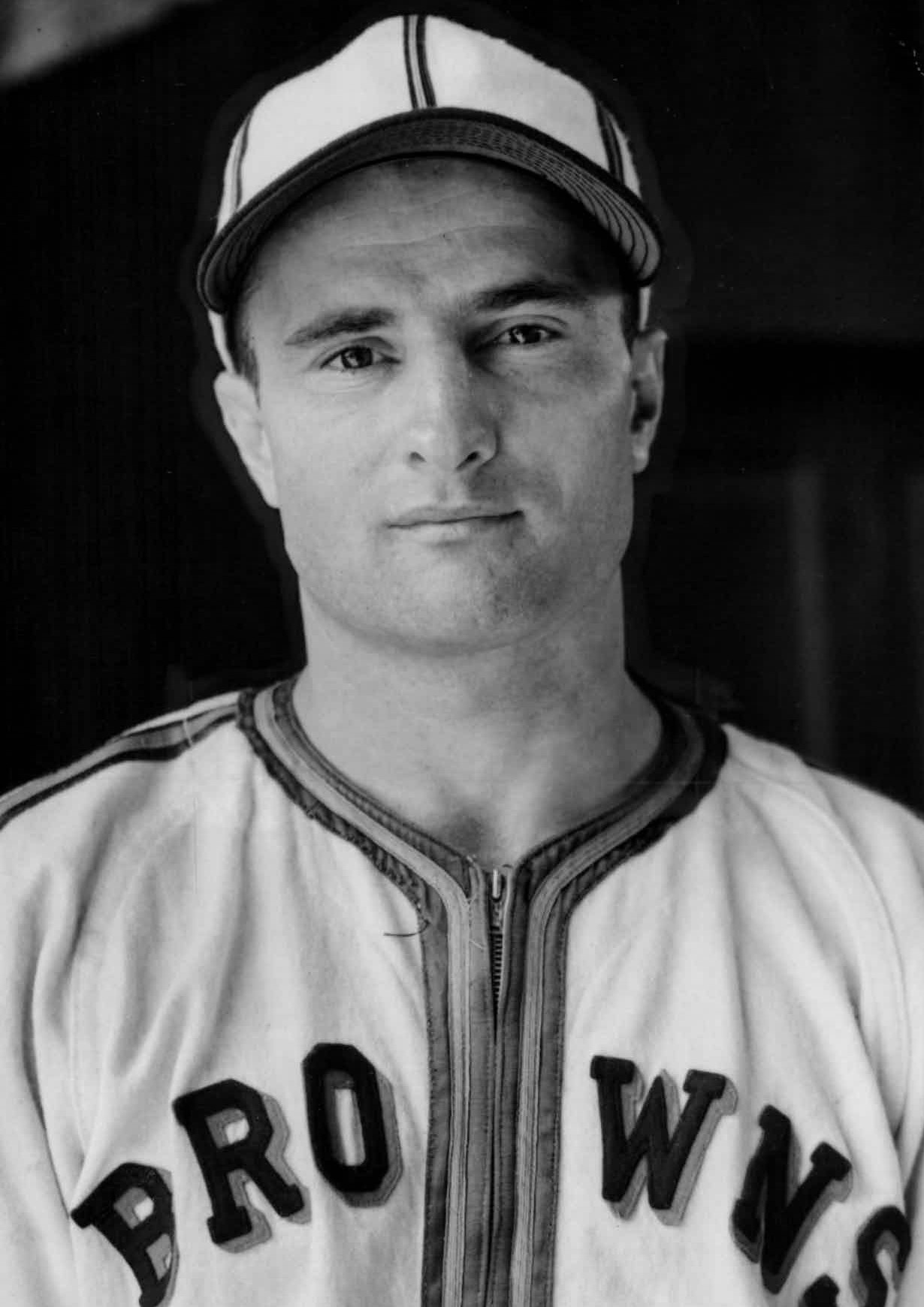
- Infielder
- Born: September 11, 1916; Valdosta, Georgia, U.S.
- Died: June 2, 2000 (aged 83); Valdosta, Georgia, U.S.
- Batted: Right Threw: Right

MLB debut
- June 7, 1942, for the Washington Senators

Last MLB appearance
- September 19, 1945, for the St. Louis Browns

MLB statistics
- Batting average: .263
- Home runs: 1
- Runs batted in: 46
- Stats at Baseball Reference

Teams
- Washington Senators (1942–1943); St. Louis Browns (1943–1945)

Ellis Clary (September 11, 1916 – June 2, 2000), nicknamed "Cat", was an American professional baseball player, coach and scout. Born in Valdosta, Georgia, he threw and batted right-handed, stood 5 ft 8 in (1.73 m) tall, and weighed 160 pounds (73 kg). He played in the Major Leagues during World War II, when the talent pool was depleted due to the military draft.

Clary's pro playing career stretched over 19 seasons (1935–53). He made his MLB debut with the Washington Senators in 1942, and he hit .275 in 240 at-bats as an infielder. In 1943, he was traded during the season to the St. Louis Browns, where he became a reserve player. He was a member of St. Louis' only American League championship team, the 1944 Browns.

In 1945, Clary batted just .211. Despite his own poor performance, he blamed the team's struggles on one-armed outfielder Pete Gray. Clary was sent down to the minor league Toledo Mud Hens in 1946. His career big league batting average was .263 with one home run and 46 RBI in 223 games.

Following his playing career, Clary was a coach for the Senators for six seasons (1955–60), and then switched to scouting when the team relocated to Minneapolis–St. Paul. He scouted for the Twins for 24 years, then worked for the Chicago White Sox and Toronto Blue Jays as a special assignment scout until his 1993 retirement.

Clary is a member of the Valdosta/Lowndes County (Ga.) Sports Hall of Fame, the Charlotte Sports Hall of Fame, and the Georgia Sports Hall of Fame.

He died in Valdosta at age 83.
