= Red Hayworth =

American baseball player (1916-2006)

- Catcher
- Born: May 14, 1916; High Point, North Carolina, U.S.
- Died: November 2, 2006 (aged 90); High Point, North Carolina, U.S.
- Batted: Right Threw: Right

MLB debut
- April 21, 1944, for the St. Louis Browns

Last MLB appearance
- September 22, 1945, for the St. Louis Browns

MLB statistics
- Batting average: .212
- Home runs: 1
- Runs batted in: 42
- Stats at Baseball Reference

Teams
- St. Louis Browns (1944–1945)

Myron Claude "Red" Hayworth (May 14, 1916 – November 2, 2006) was an American professional baseball player, manager, coach and scout. He played as a catcher in Major League Baseball from 1944 to 1945, most notably as a member of the only St. Louis Browns team to win an American League pennant in 1944. He was listed at 6 ft 1.5 in (1.87 m), 200 lb. Hayworth batted and threw right-handed.

== Baseball career ==
Hayworth was born in High Point, North Carolina. He spent more than 50 years in baseball. Considered a light-hitting but solid catcher, he started his professional career in 1936 with the Akron Yankees. After eight years in the minor leagues, he entered the majors in 1944 as one of two catchers for the only St. Louis Browns club to ever win an American League pennant. He shared duties with Frank Mancuso, hitting .222 in 90 games. The Browns lost to the St. Louis Cardinals in the 1944 World Series as Hayworth started all six games, collecting two hits in 17 at bats with one run and an RBI. He played his last majors season with St. Louis in 1945.

In a two-season career, Hayworth was a .212 hitter (91-for-430) with one home run and 42 RBI in 146 games, including 27 runs, 15 doubles, and one triple.

Following his major league career, Hayworth played, managed and coached in the minor leagues and later served as a scout until the late 1980s. His older brother, Ray Hayworth, also was a major league catcher.

Hayworth died in his hometown of High Point, North Carolina, at the age of 90.
