= George McQuinn =

American baseball player (1910–1978)

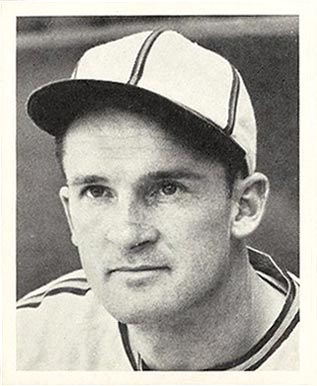
- First baseman
- Born: May 29, 1910; Arlington, Virginia, U.S.
- Died: December 24, 1978 (aged 68); Alexandria, Virginia, U.S.
- Batted: Left Threw: Left

MLB debut
- April 14, 1936, for the Cincinnati Reds

Last MLB appearance
- October 2, 1948, for the New York Yankees

MLB statistics
- Batting average: .276
- Home runs: 135
- Runs batted in: 794
- Stats at Baseball Reference

Teams
- Cincinnati Reds (1936); St. Louis Browns (1938–1945); Philadelphia Athletics (1946); New York Yankees (1947–1948)

Career highlights and awards
- 7× All-Star (1939, 1940, 1942, 1944, 1945, 1947, 1948); World Series champion (1947)

George Hartley McQuinn (May 29, 1910 – December 24, 1978) was an American professional baseball player. He played as a first baseman in Major League Baseball from 1936 to 1948, most notably as a member of the only St. Louis Browns team to win an American League pennant in 1944 and, as a member of the world champion 1947 New York Yankees. A seven-time All-Star, he threw and batted left-handed.

== Early life ==
McQuinn was born in Arlington, Virginia, and attended Washington-Lee High School.

== Baseball career ==
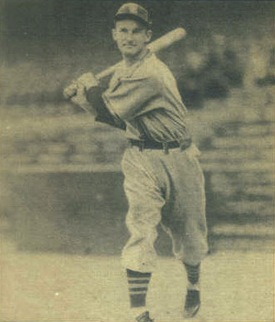
McQuinn in 1940

During his 12-year MLB playing career, McQuinn played for the Cincinnati Reds (1936), St. Louis Browns (1938–45), Philadelphia Athletics (1946) and New York Yankees (1947–48). He was selected for the American League All-Star team six times (MLB cancelled the 1945 All-Star Game and no All-Stars were named that season).

In 1938, McQuinn had a .324 career-high batting average with 12 home runs, 42 doubles, 100 runs and 82 runs batted in (RBIs). In 1939, his batting average was .316 with 101 runs scored, 94 RBIs, 37 doubles, 13 triples and 20 home runs. The following year he had 39 doubles, 10 triples and 16 home runs. In 1944, his opening-game home run gave the Browns their first victory and was their only home run in a World Series game.

In 1947, at the age of 36, McQuinn hit .304 with 13 home runs and 80 RBIs, and was nominated for the MVP Award. He retired at the end of the 1948 season at the age of 38.

McQuinn had a career batting average of .276, and a total of 135 home runs and 794 RBIs in 1,550 games. He recorded a .992 fielding percentage playing every inning of his major league career at first base. After retiring, he was a manager for the Quebec Braves in the farm system of the Boston/Milwaukee Braves, and scouted for the Washington Senators and Montreal Expos.

He was inducted into the Arlington Sports Hall of Fame in 1958 and the Virginia Sports Hall of Fame in 1978. He died of a stroke in an Alexandria, Virginia hospital, at the age 68 on December 24, 1978.

== See also ==
- List of Major League Baseball players to hit for the cycle
- Van Lingle Mungo (song)

Achievements
Preceded by Joe Gordon	Hitting for the cycle July 19, 1941	Succeeded by Leon Culberson
