= Vern Stephens =

American baseball player (1920–1968)

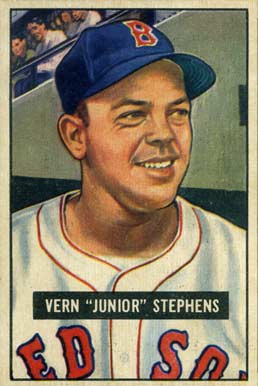
- Shortstop
- Born: October 23, 1920; McAlister, New Mexico, U.S.
- Died: November 4, 1968 (aged 48); Long Beach, California, U.S.
- Batted: Right Threw: Right

MLB debut
- September 13, 1941, for the St. Louis Browns

Last MLB appearance
- June 30, 1955, for the Chicago White Sox

MLB statistics
- Batting average: .286
- Home runs: 247
- Runs batted in: 1,174
- Stats at Baseball Reference

Teams
- St. Louis Browns (1941–1947); Boston Red Sox (1948–1952); Chicago White Sox (1953); St. Louis Browns / Baltimore Orioles (1953–1955); Chicago White Sox (1955)

Career highlights and awards
- 8× All-Star (1943–1946, 1948–1951); AL home run leader (1945); 3× AL RBI leader (1944, 1949, 1950); Boston Red Sox Hall of Fame

Vernon Decatur Stephens (October 23, 1920 – November 4, 1968) was an American professional baseball player. He played in Major League Baseball as a shortstop from 1941 through 1955. An eight-time All-Star, Stephens was notable for being the 1945 American League home run champion and was a three-time American League RBI champion. He was the cleanup hitter for the only St. Louis Browns team to win an American League pennant in 1944, and was a top power hitter for the Boston Red Sox. Nicknamed "Little Slug", "Junior", and "Buster", Stephens batted and threw right-handed. He was inducted into the Boston Red Sox Hall of Fame in 2006.

== Baseball career ==
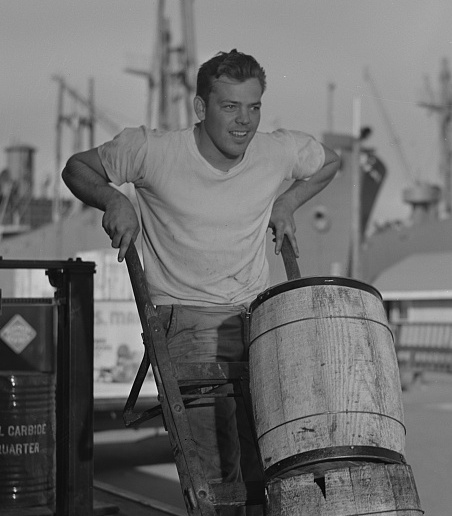
Stephens working in a shipyard during World War II.

Stephens was born in McAlister, New Mexico while his parents were en route from Oklahoma to California. He attended Long Beach Polytechnic High School in Long Beach, California.

One of the strongest-hitting shortstops in major league history, Stephens compiled a .286 batting average with 247 home runs and 1,174 RBI in 1,720 games. In 1944, Stephens led the American League with 109 runs batted in as he led the Browns to their first and only World Series appearance in St. Louis. He also led the league with 24 home runs in 1945.

Amid a salary dispute with the Browns, Stephens signed a five-year contract with the Azules de Veracruz of the Mexican League in 1946. He played in two games for Veracruz, with one single in eight at bats, before deciding to return to the United States; his father, a minor league umpire, and the Browns scout Jack Fournier drove down and brought him across the border. Stephens' departure infuriated Mexican League president (and Azules owner) Jorge Pasquel, but it saved him from the five-year suspension that Commissioner of Baseball Happy Chandler levied on the other major leaguers who "jumped" to Mexico.

After the 1947 season, he was traded along with Jack Kramer to the Boston Red Sox, but later, after a brief stint with the Chicago White Sox, returned to the Browns in 1953, their last season in St. Louis. Stephens was the only member of the pennant-winning 1944 St. Louis Browns who played with the Baltimore Orioles when the Browns moved to Baltimore in 1954.

Stephens played five years with the Boston Red Sox from 1948 to 1952. Ted Williams said that he was the most effective of those who followed him in the batting order. In 1949 he hit 39 home runs, second only to Williams's 43. No other player in the American League had more than 24 homers that year. Second baseman Bobby Doerr, who was lionized in David Halberstam's book Summer of '49, hit 18 home runs. In 1949 he also batted in 159 runs, tying teammate Williams for the MLB lead. It was the first time in history that two teammates tied for the league lead in RBI. Remarkably, the next year, in 1950, he led the league in RBI again, but again tying a teammate, this time first baseman Walt Dropo, each of them collecting 144 RBI.

In August 2008, he was named as one of the ten former players who began their careers before 1943 to be considered by the Veterans Committee for induction into the National Baseball Hall of Fame and Museum in 2009. He was not selected.

== Death ==
Vern Stephens died on November 4, 1968 from a heart attack in Long Beach, California at 48 years of age.

== Highlights ==
- 8-time All-Star (1943–1944, 1945 [non-official game], 1946, 1948–1951)
- Six times in the Top 10 in MVP voting (1942–1945, 1948–1949)
- Led the American League in home runs during 1945
- Three times led the American League in RBI (1944, 1949–1950)
- Collected 440 RBI within three consecutive seasons (1948–1950)
- Three times in the Top 10 in batting average (1942–1943, 1946)
- Twice led the American League in games played (1948–1949)
- Was inducted into the Boston Red Sox Hall of Fame in 2006
- Only man to play for the 1944 American League Champion St. Louis Browns and the Baltimore Orioles, the team the Browns franchise became after it moved to Baltimore in 1954
- Holds the MLB record for RBI in a season by a shortstop, with 159 in 1949
- Became the first shortstop to hit 30 home runs in a season, with 39 in 1949
- Attended Polytechnic High School, Long Beach, California (also attended by Tony Gwynn, Chase Utley, Milton Bradley, etc.)

== See also ==
- Baseball Hall of Fame balloting, 2009
- List of Major League Baseball career home run leaders
- List of Boston Red Sox awards
- List of Major League Baseball career runs scored leaders
- List of Major League Baseball career runs batted in leaders
- List of Major League Baseball annual runs batted in leaders
- List of Major League Baseball annual home run leaders
