= 1945 Major League Baseball season =

1945 MLB season
- League: American League (AL); National League (NL)
- Sport: Baseball
- Duration: Regular season: April 17 – September 30, 1945; World Series: October 3–10, 1945
- Games: 154
- Teams: 16 (8 per league)

Regular season
- Season MVP: AL: Hal Newhouser (DET); NL: Phil Cavarretta (CHC)
- AL champions: Detroit Tigers
- AL runners-up: Washington Senators
- NL champions: Chicago Cubs
- NL runners-up: St. Louis Cardinals

World Series
- Champions: Detroit Tigers
- Runners-up: Chicago Cubs

MLB seasons
- ← 1944 1946 →

Locations of teams for the 1942–1953 American League seasons
American League
Locations of teams for the 1943–1952 National League seasons
National League

The 1945 major league baseball season began on April 17, 1945. The regular season ended on September 30, with the Chicago Cubs and Detroit Tigers as the regular season champions of the National League and American League, respectively. The postseason began with Game 1 of the 42nd World Series on October 3 and ended with Game 7 on October 10. In the fourth iteration of this World Series matchup, the Tigers defeated the Cubs, four games to three, capturing their second championship in franchise history, since their previous in 1935. It would prove to be the Cubs' last appearance in a World Series until the 2016 World Series. Going into the season, the defending World Series champions were the St. Louis Cardinals from the 1944 season.

The scheduled 13th All-Star Game, to be held at Fenway Park and hosted by the Boston Red Sox, was cancelled due to wartime travel restrictions in World War II. The Red Sox would host the following year.

This would be the last season in which any team's minor-league affiliates played under the color barrier, as Jackie Robinson was signed to the Brooklyn Dodgers' top minor-league affiliate, the Montreal Royals, in late-October, following the World Series. He would eventually break the major-league color barrier following his promotion to the majors in 1947.

This was Happy Chandler's first season serving as Commissioner of Baseball (though due to his position as US Senator of Kentucky, he would not be formally appointed until November 1, following his resignation of the Senate), following the death of 24-year commissioner Kenesaw Mountain Landis in 1944.

== Schedule ==
The 1945 schedule consisted of 154 games for all teams in the American League and National League, each of which had eight teams. Each team was scheduled to play 22 games against the other seven teams of their respective league. This continued the format put in place since the 1904 season (except for 1919) and would be used until 1961 in the American League and 1962 in the National League.

Opening Day took place on April 17, featuring all sixteen teams, the first since the 1942 season. The final day of the regular season was on September 30, which saw fourteen teams play. In a scheduling oddity, the Washington Senators of the AL saw their season finish a week earlier on September 23, partly due to World War II travel restrictions, but also the need to convert Griffith Stadium's playing field to host its autumn football tenants, the NFL Washington Redskins and Georgetown University. The World Series took place between October 3 and October 10.

== Rule changes ==
The 1945 season saw the following rule changes:

- In addition to unlimited weekday nights, unrestricted ability to play night games was expanded to include Saturdays. All but holidays and Sundays were still restricted. Also, the host team was required to get formal consent from the visiting team to play at night. Night games on Sunday would not exist until 1990, with ESPN's Sunday Night Baseball.
- The "Barrow Regulation" was passed, prohibiting teams from renting its ballpark to a football team as long as the baseball team had a chance of playing in the World Series.

== Teams ==
An asterisk (*) denotes the ballpark a team played the minority of their home games at

League	Team	City	Ballpark	Capacity	Manager
American League	Boston Red Sox	Boston, Massachusetts	Fenway Park	33,817	Joe Cronin
American League	Chicago White Sox	Chicago, Illinois	Comiskey Park	50,000	Jimmy Dykes
American League	Cleveland Indians	Cleveland, Ohio	Cleveland Stadium	78,811	Lou Boudreau
American League	Cleveland Indians	Cleveland, Ohio	League Park*	22,500*	Lou Boudreau
American League	Detroit Tigers	Detroit, Michigan	Briggs Stadium	58,000	Steve O'Neill
American League	New York Yankees	New York, New York	Yankee Stadium	70,000	Joe McCarthy
American League	Philadelphia Athletics	Philadelphia, Pennsylvania	Shibe Park	33,000	Connie Mack
American League	St. Louis Browns	St. Louis, Missouri	Sportsman's Park	34,023	Luke Sewell
American League	Washington Senators	Washington, D.C.	Griffith Stadium	32,000	Ossie Bluege
National League	Boston Braves	Boston, Massachusetts	Braves Field	37,746	Bob Coleman
National League	Boston Braves	Boston, Massachusetts	Braves Field	37,746	Del Bissonette
National League	Brooklyn Dodgers	New York, New York	Ebbets Field	35,000	Leo Durocher
National League	Chicago Cubs	Chicago, Illinois	Wrigley Field	38,396	Charlie Grimm
National League	Cincinnati Reds	Cincinnati, Ohio	Crosley Field	29,401	Bill McKechnie
National League	New York Giants	New York, New York	Polo Grounds	56,000	Mel Ott
National League	Philadelphia Phillies	Philadelphia, Pennsylvania	Shibe Park	33,000	Freddie Fitzsimmons
National League	Philadelphia Phillies	Philadelphia, Pennsylvania	Shibe Park	33,000	Ben Chapman
National League	Pittsburgh Pirates	Pittsburgh, Pennsylvania	Forbes Field	33,467	Frankie Frisch
National League	St. Louis Cardinals	St. Louis, Missouri	Sportsman's Park	34,023	Billy Southworth

== Standings ==
=== American League ===
American League
Team	W	L	Pct.	GB	Home	Road
Detroit Tigers	88	65	.575	—	50‍–‍26	38‍–‍39
Washington Senators	87	67	.565	1½	46‍–‍31	41‍–‍36
St. Louis Browns	81	70	.536	6	47‍–‍27	34‍–‍43
New York Yankees	81	71	.533	6½	48‍–‍28	33‍–‍43
Cleveland Indians	73	72	.503	11	44‍–‍33	29‍–‍39
Chicago White Sox	71	78	.477	15	44‍–‍29	27‍–‍49
Boston Red Sox	71	83	.461	17½	42‍–‍35	29‍–‍48
Philadelphia Athletics	52	98	.347	34½	39‍–‍35	13‍–‍63

=== National League ===
National League
Team	W	L	Pct.	GB	Home	Road
Chicago Cubs	98	56	.636	—	49‍–‍26	49‍–‍30
St. Louis Cardinals	95	59	.617	3	48‍–‍29	47‍–‍30
Brooklyn Dodgers	87	67	.565	11	48‍–‍30	39‍–‍37
Pittsburgh Pirates	82	72	.532	16	45‍–‍34	37‍–‍38
New York Giants	78	74	.513	19	47‍–‍30	31‍–‍44
Boston Braves	67	85	.441	30	36‍–‍38	31‍–‍47
Cincinnati Reds	61	93	.396	37	36‍–‍41	25‍–‍52
Philadelphia Phillies	46	108	.299	52	22‍–‍55	24‍–‍53

=== Tie games ===
12 tie games (8 in AL, 4 in NL), which are not factored into winning percentage or games behind (and were often replayed again) occurred throughout the season.

==== American League ====
- Boston Red Sox, 3
- Chicago White Sox, 1
- Cleveland Indians, 2
- Detroit Tigers, 2
- Philadelphia Athletics, 3
- St. Louis Browns, 3
- Washington Senators, 2

==== National League ====
- Boston Braves, 2
- Brooklyn Dodgers, 1
- Chicago Cubs, 1
- New York Giants, 1
- Pittsburgh Pirates, 1
- St. Louis Cardinals, 1

== Postseason ==
The postseason began on October 3 and ended on October 10 with the Detroit Tigers defeating the Chicago Cubs in the 1945 World Series in seven games.

=== Bracket ===
World Series
AL	Detroit Tigers	4
NL	Chicago Cubs	3

== Managerial changes ==
=== In-season ===
Team	Former Manager	New Manager
Boston Braves	Bob Coleman	Del Bissonette
Philadelphia Phillies	Freddie Fitzsimmons	Ben Chapman

== League leaders ==
Any team shown in small text indicates a previous team a player was on during the season.

=== American League ===
Hitting leaders
Stat	Player	Total
AVG	Snuffy Stirnweiss (NYY)	.309
OPS	Snuffy Stirnweiss (NYY)	.862
HR	Vern Stephens (SLB)	24
RBI	Nick Etten (NYY)	111
R	Snuffy Stirnweiss (NYY)	107
H	Snuffy Stirnweiss (NYY)	195
SB	Snuffy Stirnweiss (NYY)	33

Pitching leaders
Stat	Player	Total
W	Hal Newhouser^{1} (DET)	25
L	Bobo Newsom (PHA)	20
ERA	Hal Newhouser^{1} (DET)	1.81
K	Hal Newhouser^{1} (DET)	212
IP	Hal Newhouser (DET)	313.1
SV	Jim Turner (NYY)	10
WHIP	Roger Wolff (WSH)	1.012

^{1} American League Triple Crown pitching winner

=== National League ===
Hitting leaders
Stat	Player	Total
AVG	Phil Cavarretta (CHC)	.355
OPS	Tommy Holmes (BSN)	.997
HR	Tommy Holmes (BSN)	28
RBI	Dixie Walker (BRO)	124
R	Eddie Stanky (BRO)	124
H	Tommy Holmes (BSN)	224
SB	Red Schoendienst (STL)	26

Pitching leaders
Stat	Player	Total
W	Red Barrett (STL/BSN)	23
L	Dick Barrett (PHI)	20
ERA	Ray Prim (CHC)	2.40
K	Preacher Roe (PIT)	148
IP	Red Barrett (STL/BSN)	284.2
SV	Ace Adams (NYG); Andy Karl (PHI)	15
WHIP	Ray Prim (CHC)	0.998

== Milestones ==
=== Batters ===
==== Cycles ====
- Bob Elliott (PIT):
  - Elliott hit for his first cycle and 12th in franchise history, in game two of a doubleheader on July 15 against the Brooklyn Dodgers.
- Bill Salkeld (PIT):
  - Salkeld hit for his first cycle and 13th in franchise history, on August 4 against the St. Louis Cardinals.

==== Other batting accomplishments ====
- Mel Ott (NYG):
  - Became the third player in Major League history to hit 500 home runs in the third inning against the Boston Braves on August 1.

=== Pitchers ===
==== No-hitters ====
- Dick Fowler (PHA):
  - Fowler threw his first career no-hitter and the fourth no-hitter in franchise history, by defeating the St. Louis Browns 1–0 in game two of a doubleheader on September 9. Fowler walked four and struck out six.

=== Miscellaneous ===
- Pete Gray (SLB):
  - On April 17, became the first of three one-armed man to ever play in the Major Leagues (though only player to play missing his arm above the elbow). He batted .218 in 77 games.

== Awards and honors ==
The Sporting News Most Valuable Player Award went to Detroit Tigers third baseman Eddie Mayo; however, following a post-season vote, the official AL MVP Award was given to fellow Detroit Tiger Hal Newhouser, a pitcher. Newhouser ended the season with an ERA of 1.81, a record of 25 wins and 9 losses, and 212 strikeouts. Both of them helped lead the Detroit Tigers to a World Series win, and Newhouser remarked that Eddie Mayo was the driving force behind the 1945 pennant chase and that Mayo was a "take-charge kind of guy in our field."

The NL Most Valuable Player Award went to Chicago Cubs first baseman and outfielder Phil Cavarretta. He ended the season with an impressive batting average of .355 and an on-base-percentage of .455. The second-place finisher was Boston Braves player Tommy Holmes who finished the season with a batting average of .352 and an impressive slugging percentage of .577.

=== Regular season ===
Baseball Writers' Association of America Awards
BBWAA Award	National League	American League
Most Valuable Player	Phil Cavarretta (CHC)	Hal Newhouser (DET)

=== Other awards ===
The Sporting News Awards
Award	National League	American League
Most Valuable Player	Tommy Holmes (BSN)	Eddie Mayo (DET)
Player of the Year	—	Hal Newhouser (DET)
Pitcher of the Year	Hank Borowy (CHC)	Hal Newhouser (DET)
Manager of the Year	—	Ossie Bluege (WSH)
Executive of the Year	Philip K. Wrigley (CHC)	—

=== Baseball Hall of Fame ===
- Roger Bresnahan
- Dan Brouthers
- Fred Clarke
- Jimmy Collins
- Ed Delahanty
- Hugh Duffy
- Hughie Jennings
- King Kelly
- Jim O'Rourke
- Wilbert Robinson (manager)

== Home field attendance ==
Team name	Wins	%±	Home attendance	%±	Per game
Detroit Tigers	88	0.0%	1,280,341	38.7%	16,847
Brooklyn Dodgers	87	38.1%	1,059,220	74.8%	13,580
Chicago Cubs	98	30.7%	1,036,386	61.9%	13,637
New York Giants	78	16.4%	1,016,468	50.7%	13,032
New York Yankees	81	−2.4%	881,845	11.6%	11,603
Chicago White Sox	71	0.0%	657,981	16.8%	8,892
Washington Senators	87	35.9%	652,660	24.3%	8,367
Pittsburgh Pirates	82	−8.9%	604,694	0.1%	7,654
Boston Red Sox	71	−7.8%	603,794	19.1%	7,741
St. Louis Cardinals	95	−9.5%	594,630	28.7%	7,623
Cleveland Indians	73	1.4%	558,182	17.4%	7,249
St. Louis Browns	81	−9.0%	482,986	−5.0%	6,355
Philadelphia Athletics	52	−27.8%	462,631	−8.4%	6,008
Boston Braves	67	3.1%	374,178	79.3%	4,989
Cincinnati Reds	61	−31.5%	290,070	−29.2%	3,767
Philadelphia Phillies	46	−24.6%	285,057	−22.9%	3,702

== Venues ==
Over 77 home games, the Cleveland Indians played 46 games at Cleveland Stadium and 31 games at League Park. All Sunday and Monday home games took place at Cleveland Stadium. This would be the 11th of 12 seasons since 1932 that saw the Indians play at both venues.

== See also ==
- 1945 in baseball (Events, Births, Deaths)
- 1945 All-American Girls Professional Baseball League season
