= 1945 Washington Senators season =

1945 Washington Senators
- League: American League
- Ballpark: Griffith Stadium
- City: Washington, D.C.
- Record: 87–67 (.565)
- League place: 2nd
- Owners: Clark Griffith and George H. Richardson
- Managers: Ossie Bluege
- Radio: WOL (AM)/WWDC (FM) (Arch McDonald, Russ Hodges)

The 1945 Washington Senators won 87 games, lost 67, and finished in second place in the American League. They were managed by Ossie Bluege and played their home games at Griffith Stadium, where they drew 652,660 fans, fourth-most in the eight-team league. The 1945 Senators represented the 45th edition of the Major League Baseball franchise and were the last of the 20th-century Senators to place higher than fourth in the American League; the team moved to Minneapolis–Saint Paul in 1961 to become the modern Minnesota Twins.

When the regular season ended on September 30, Washington trailed the pennant-winning Detroit Tigers (88–65) by 11/2 games. But because of World War II travel restrictions and the need to convert Griffith Stadium's playing field to host its autumn football tenants, the NFL Washington Redskins and Georgetown University, the Senators' 1945 schedule had actually ended seven days before, on Sunday, September 23. On that day, the "Griffs" stood one full game behind 86–64 Detroit. As the idle Senators waited, the Tigers had four games to play, two each against the fifth-place Cleveland Indians and third-place St. Louis Browns. After splitting against the Indians, Detroit was rained out for three days in St. Louis. When the Tigers defeated the Browns 6–3 in the first game of the doubleheader on September 30 (on a come-from-behind, grand slam home run by Hank Greenberg), the Senators were mathematically eliminated and Detroit clinched the pennant. The second game of the twin bill was rained out.

Outstanding pitching drove the 1945 Senators' success. Washington led the American League in team earned run average (2.92). Its starting rotation featured four knuckleball artists—Roger Wolff, Dutch Leonard, Johnny Niggeling and Mickey Haefner—who combined for 60 victories. Wolff and Leonard posted sterling 2.12 and 2.13 earned run averages, third and fourth in the league.

== Regular season ==
- August 4, 1945: Amputee and World War II veteran Bert Shepard pitches in an official American League game against the Boston Red Sox. Shepard, a United States Army Air Forces fighter pilot who lost his right leg 11 inches below the knee when his plane was shot down over Germany on May 21, 1944, was fitted with an artificial leg. In spring 1945, the Senators signed the former minor league hurler as a coach and batting practice pitcher and activated him in August. Called into a one-sided contest in the second game of a doubleheader at Griffith Stadium on August 4, Shepard gave up only one run in 5 1/3 innings while striking out two Red Sox batters.
- September 7, 1945: Washington first baseman Joe Kuhel homers off the Browns' Bob Muncrief to provide the winning margin in a 3–2 Senator victory at Griffith Stadium. It is the only four-bagger struck all season by the Senators in 78 home games in their spacious ballpark—and it was an inside-the-park job. Opposing teams hit only six home runs themselves in 1945 at Washington's home field.

=== Season standings ===
American League
Team	W	L	Pct.	GB	Home	Road
Detroit Tigers	88	65	.575	—	50‍–‍26	38‍–‍39
Washington Senators	87	67	.565	1½	46‍–‍31	41‍–‍36
St. Louis Browns	81	70	.536	6	47‍–‍27	34‍–‍43
New York Yankees	81	71	.533	6½	48‍–‍28	33‍–‍43
Cleveland Indians	73	72	.503	11	44‍–‍33	29‍–‍39
Chicago White Sox	71	78	.477	15	44‍–‍29	27‍–‍49
Boston Red Sox	71	83	.461	17½	42‍–‍35	29‍–‍48
Philadelphia Athletics	52	98	.347	34½	39‍–‍35	13‍–‍63

=== Record vs. opponents ===
1945 American League record Sources:
Team	BOS	CWS	CLE	DET	NYY	PHA	SLB	WSH
Boston	—	9–13	11–11	12–10–1	6–16	14–8	8–14–1	11–11–1
Chicago	13–9	—	11–8–1	10–12	9–12	12–10	8–13	8–14
Cleveland	11–11	8–11–1	—	11–11	12–9	12–6–1	11–10	8–14
Detroit	10–12–1	12–10	11–11	—	15–7	15–7–1	15–6	10–12
New York	16–6	12–9	9–12	7–15	—	16–6	7–15	14–8
Philadelphia	8–14	10–12	6–12–1	7–15–1	6–16	—	10–12–1	5–17
St. Louis	14–8–1	13–8	10–11	6–15	15–7	12–10–1	—	11–11–1
Washington	11–11–1	14–8	14–8	12–10	8–14	17–5	11–11–1	—

=== Notable transactions ===
- July 26, 1945: The Senators sell the contract of outfielder Jake Powell to the Philadelphia Phillies.
- August 8, 1945: The Senators purchase the contract of outfielder Mike Kreevich from the St. Louis Browns.
- August 30, 1945: The Senators sign veteran free-agent pitcher Pete Appleton.

=== Roster ===
1945 Washington Senators
Roster
Pitchers: -- Pete Appleton; 18 Alex Carrasquel; 14 Joe Cleary; 10 Mickey Haefner; 19 Wally Holborow; 16 Dutch Leonard; 35 Walt Masterson; 12 Johnny Niggeling; 15 Marino Pieretti; 32 Armando Roche; 34 Bert Shepard; 21 Dick Stone; 28 Sandy Ullrich; 17 Roger Wolff	Catchers: 11 Al Evans; 8 Rick Ferrell; 9 Mike Guerra; Infielders: 3 Harlond Clift; 4 Dick Kimble; 5 Joe Kuhel; 22 Hillis Layne; 24 George Myatt; 25 Gil Torres; 23 Cecil Travis; 20 Fred Vaughn	Outfielders: 7 George Binks; 1 George Case; 6 Walt Chipple; 32 Mike Kreevich; 2 Buddy Lewis; 6 Howie McFarland; 4 Jake Powell; 35 Vince Ventura; 27 José Zardón	Manager: 30 Ossie Bluege; Coaches: 33 Nick Altrock; 29 Joe Fitzgerald; 38 Joe Judge; 31 Clyde Milan; 34 Bert Shepard

== Player stats ==
=== Batting ===
==== Starters by position ====
Note: Pos = Position; G = Games played; AB = At bats; H = Hits; Avg. = Batting average; HR = Home runs; RBI = Runs batted in

Pos	Player	G	AB	H	Avg.	HR	RBI
C	Rick Ferrell	91	286	76	.266	1	38
1B	Joe Kuhel	142	533	152	.285	2	75
2B	George Myatt	133	490	145	.296	1	39
SS	Gil Torres	147	562	133	.237	0	48
3B	Harlond Clift	119	375	79	.211	8	53
OF	Buddy Lewis	69	258	86	.333	2	37
OF	George Binks	145	550	153	.278	6	81
OF	George Case	123	504	148	.294	1	31

==== Other batters ====
Note: G = Games played; AB = At bats; H = Hits; Avg. = Batting average; HR = Home runs; RBI = Runs batted in

Player	G	AB	H	Avg.	HR	RBI
Fred Vaughn	80	268	63	.235	1	25
Mike Kreevich	45	158	44	.278	1	23
Al Evans	51	150	39	.260	2	19
Hillis Layne	60	147	44	.299	1	14
Mike Guerra	56	138	29	.210	1	15
José Zardón	54	131	38	.290	0	13
Jake Powell	31	98	19	.194	0	3
Vince Ventura	18	58	12	.207	0	2
Cecil Travis	15	54	13	.241	0	10
Dick Kimble	20	49	12	.245	0	1
Walt Chipple	18	44	6	.136	0	5
Howie McFarland	6	11	1	.091	0	2

=== Pitching ===
==== Starting pitchers ====
Note: G = Games pitched; IP = Innings pitched; W = Wins; L = Losses; ERA = Earned run average; SO = Strikeouts

Player	G	IP	W	L	ERA	SO
Roger Wolff	33	250.0	20	10	2.12	108
Mickey Haefner	37	238.1	16	14	3.47	83
Dutch Leonard	31	216.0	17	7	2.13	96
Johnny Niggeling	26	176.2	7	12	3.16	90

==== Other pitchers ====
Note: G = Games pitched; IP = Innings pitched; W = Wins; L = Losses; ERA = Earned run average; SO = Strikeouts

Player	G	IP	W	L	ERA	SO
Marino Pieretti	44	233.1	14	13	3.32	66
Alex Carrasquel	35	122.2	7	5	2.71	38
Sandy Ullrich	28	81.1	3	3	4.54	26
Walt Masterson	4	25.0	1	2	1.08	14
Pete Appleton	6	21.1	1	0	3.38	12

==== Relief pitchers ====
Note: G = Games pitched; W = Wins; L = Losses; SV = Saves; ERA = Earned run average; SO = Strikeouts

Player	G	W	L	SV	ERA	SO
Wally Holborow	15	1	1	0	2.30	14
Dick Stone	3	0	0	0	0.00	0
Armando Roche	2	0	0	0	6.00	0
Bert Shepard	1	0	0	0	1.69	2
Joe Cleary	1	0	0	0	189.00	1

== Farm system ==
Level	Team	League	Manager
A1	Chattanooga Lookouts	Southern Association	Bert Niehoff
A	Williamsport Grays	Eastern League	Ray Kolp
