= List of knuckleball pitchers =

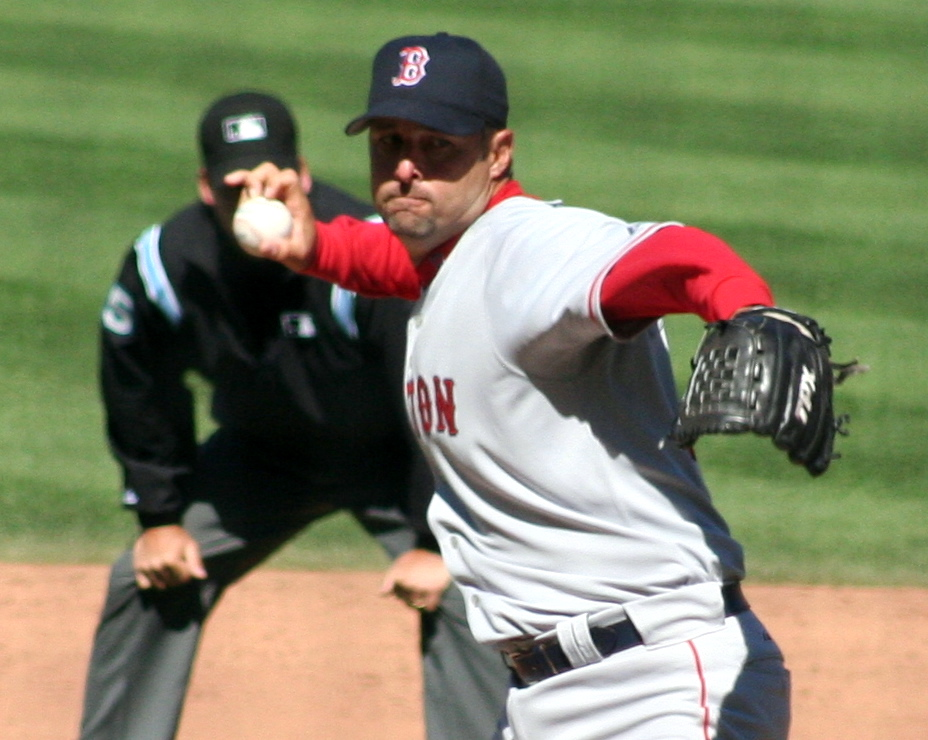
Tim Wakefield throwing a knuckleball

Knuckleball pitchers are baseball players who rely on the knuckleball as their primary pitch, or pitch primarily based on their ability to throw a knuckleball. The inventor of the knuckleball has never been established, although several pitchers from the early 20th century have been credited. Baseball statistician and historian Rob Neyer named four individuals in an article he wrote in the 2004 book The Neyer/James Guide to Pitchers as potentially deserving credit, any of whom may have originated the pitch in either the 1907 or 1908 seasons. Nap Rucker of the Brooklyn Dodgers came up to the majors in 1907, initially throwing hard stuff but later switching to the knuckleball. A 1908 article credited Lew Moren as the inventor of the pitch. Ed Cicotte earned a full-time spot with the Detroit Tigers in 1908, earning the nickname "Knuckles" for his signature pitch. A picture of Ed Summers showed him gripping what he called a "dry spitter" using a variation of the knuckleball grip using the knuckles of his index and middle fingers.

Unlike almost every other pitch in baseball, the knuckleball's erratic trajectory has often required teams to use dedicated catchers, often using specialized mitts, to field the deliveries. Clint Courtney used a specially constructed catcher's mitt, about 50% larger than the conventional mitts used at the time, to catch knuckleballer Hoyt Wilhelm during a game in May 1960. Umpire Al Smith credited the use of the glove with preventing three or four passed balls in that one game. The lower velocity of the knuckleball is credited with giving some who use it the ability to pitch more often and to sustain pitching careers far longer than those who rely on their fastball to get outs. Tim Wakefield pitched on consecutive days, when most starting pitchers in the 21st century throw after four days of rest. Hoyt Wilhelm pitched until he was almost 50 and Phil Niekro used the pitch until he was 48. Wakefield retired at 45.

The prevalence of the knuckleballer has varied over time. The 1945 Washington Senators finished 1 1/2 games out of first place with a starting pitching staff that almost exclusively used the pitch, with four knuckleballers in the rotation. That season, the team's three catchers — regular catcher Rick Ferrell and backups Al Evans and Mike Guerra — combined for 40 passed balls, more than double that of any other team in the league.

Baseball broadcaster Bob Uecker, who was Phil Niekro's personal catcher with the Braves in 1967, has been quoted as saying "The way to catch a knuckleball is to wait until it stops rolling, then go pick it up."

Wilbur Wood, Joe Niekro, and R. A. Dickey have won The Sporting News Pitcher of the Year Award. In 2012, Dickey became the only knuckleballer to have won the Cy Young Award. Phil Niekro is the only knuckleball pitcher to win 300 games.

== Primary knuckleballers ==
The following lists knuckleball pitchers who are primarily known for throwing the knuckleball or those who established professional careers based on throwing the knuckleball. Individuals who threw the pitch occasionally or those who did not play professional baseball primarily as a pitcher are excluded. Major League Baseball career statistics are from Baseball-Reference.com.

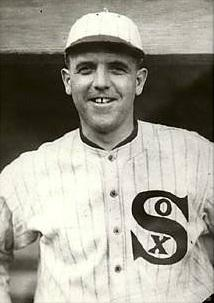
Eddie Cicotte is credited as the inventor of the knuckleball.

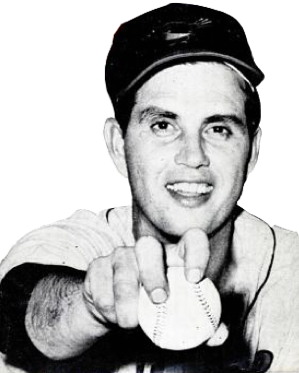
Hoyt Wilhelm won 124 games in relief, the major league record, and was the first pitcher to reach 200 saves and the first to appear in 1,000 games.

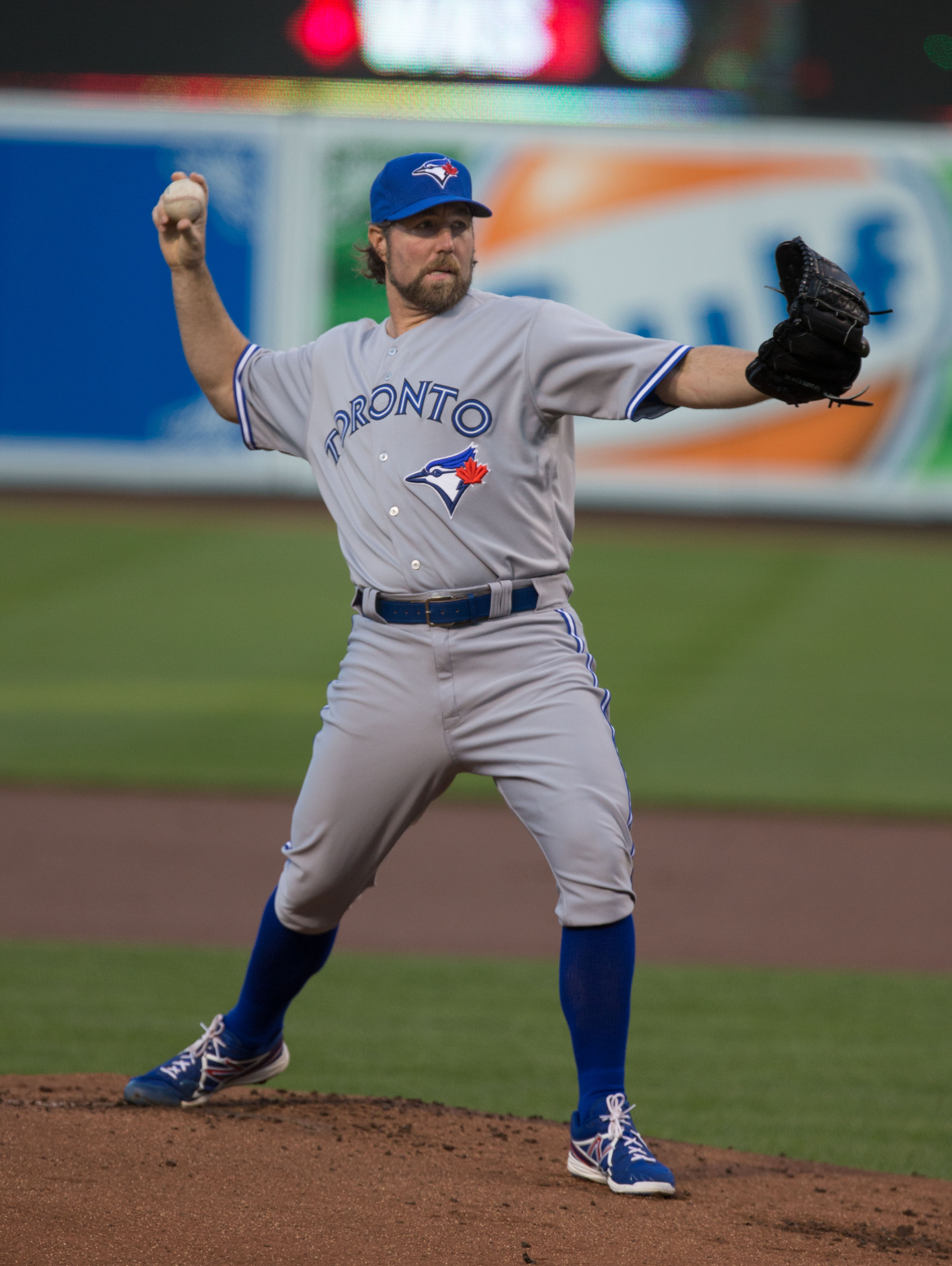
R. A. Dickey reinvented his career by developing a knuckleball.

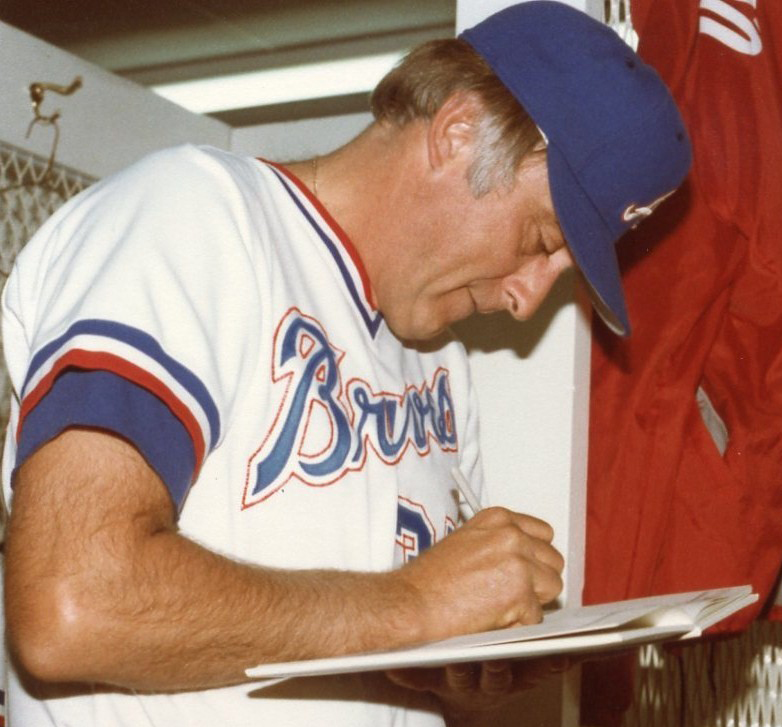
Phil Niekro is the only knuckleballer to win 300 games.

Key
G	Games pitched
W	Career wins
L	Career losses
SV	Career saves
ERA	Career earned run average
†	Member of the Baseball Hall of Fame
*	Cy Young Award winner

Knuckleball pitchers
Name	Debut	Final	G	W	L	SV	ERA	Ref(s)	Bats	Throws
Gene Bearden	1947	1953	193	45	38	1	3.96		Left	Left
Danny Boone	1981	1990	16	2	1	4	3.36		Left	Left
Jim Bouton	1962	1978	304	62	63	6	3.57		Right	Right
Wally Burnette	1956	1958	68	14	21	1	3.56		Right	Right
Tom Candiotti	1983	1999	451	151	164	0	3.73		Right	Right
Eddie Cicotte	1905	1920	502	208	149	25	2.38		Switch	Right
R. A. Dickey*	2001	2017	400	120	118	2	4.04		Right	Right
Ryan Feierabend	2006	2021	32	2	12	0	7.21		Left	Left
Jared Fernández	2001	2006	37	4	7	0	5.05		Right	Right
Eddie Fisher	1959	1973	690	80	70	81	3.41		Right	Right
Freddie Fitzsimmons	1925	1943	513	217	146	13	3.51		Right	Right
Eddie Gamboa	2016	2016	7	0	2	0	1.35		Right	Right
Mickey Haefner	1943	1950	261	78	91	13	3.50		Left	Left
Charlie Haeger	2006	2010	19	2	7	1	6.35		Right	Right
Jesse Haines ^{†}	1918	1937	555	210	158	10	3.64		Right	Right
Charlie Hough	1970	1994	858	216	216	61	3.75		Right	Right
Dutch Leonard	1933	1953	640	191	181	44	3.25		Right	Right
Ted Lyons^{†}	1923	1946	594	260	230	23	3.67		Switch	Right
Lew Moren	1903	1910	141	48	57	3	2.95		Right	Right
Joe Niekro	1967	1988	702	221	204	16	3.59		Right	Right
Phil Niekro^{†}	1964	1987	864	318	274	29	3.35		Right	Right
Johnny Niggeling	1938	1945	184	64	69	0	3.22		Right	Right
Al Papai	1948	1955	88	9	14	4	5.37		Right	Right
Bob Purkey	1954	1966	386	129	115	9	3.79		Right	Right
Steve Sparks	1995	2004	270	59	76	3	4.88		Right	Right
Dennis Springer	1995	2002	130	24	48	1	5.18		Right	Right
Ed Summers	1908	1912	138	68	45	3	2.42		Right	Right
Eddie Rommel	1920	1932	501	171	119	30	3.54		Right	Right
Tim Wakefield	1992	2011	627	200	180	22	4.41		Right	Right
Matt Waldron	2023	Present	53	10	17	0	5.16		Right	Right
Hoyt Wilhelm^{†}	1952	1972	1070	143	122	227	2.52		Right	Right
Roger Wolff	1941	1947	182	52	69	13	3.41		Right	Right
Wilbur Wood	1961	1978	651	164	156	57	3.24		Right	Left
Steven Wright	2013	2019	81	24	16	0	3.86		Right	Right

== See also ==
- Major League Baseball leaders in career wins
- List of Major League Baseball annual strikeout leaders
- List of Major League Baseball annual ERA leaders
- Sporting News Pitcher of the Year Award
- Cy Young Award
