= Matt Waldron =

American baseball player (born 1996)

Washington Nationals – No. 56
- Pitcher
- Born: September 26, 1996 (age 30); Omaha, Nebraska, U.S.
- Bats: Right Throws: Right

MLB debut
- June 24, 2023, for the San Diego Padres

MLB statistics (through 2026 season)
- Win–loss record: 10–17
- Earned run average: 5.16
- Strikeouts: 200
- Stats at Baseball Reference

Teams
- San Diego Padres (2023–2026); Toronto Blue Jays (2026); Washington Nationals (2026–present)

Matthew Lawrence Waldron (born September 26, 1996) is an American professional baseball pitcher for the Washington Nationals of Major League Baseball (MLB). He has previously played in MLB for the San Diego Padres and Toronto Blue Jays.

== Career ==
=== Amateur ===
Waldron attended Westside High School in Omaha, Nebraska, where he played on their baseball team and went 9–0 with a 1.29 ERA, 82 strikeouts, and seven walks over 65 innings as a senior in 2015. He threw a no-hitter in the Class A Baseball State Championship, helping lead Westside to their third straight title. He went unselected in the 2015 Major League Baseball draft, and enrolled at the University of Nebraska where he played college baseball for the Nebraska Cornhuskers for four years. As a senior in 2019, he made 14 starts and went 6–4 with a 3.05 ERA and 93 strikeouts over 100 1/3 innings.

=== Cleveland Indians ===
Following the season's end, he was selected by the Cleveland Indians in the 18th round of the 2019 Major League Baseball draft.

Waldron signed with the Indians and made his professional debut with the rookie–level Arizona League Indians before he was promoted to the Low–A Mahoning Valley Scrappers. Over 45 2/3 innings between the two teams, he went 4–0 with a 2.96 ERA. He did not play a minor league game in 2020 due to the cancellation of the minor league season because of the COVID-19 pandemic.

=== San Diego Padres ===
On August 31, 2020, the Indians traded Waldron, Mike Clevinger, and Greg Allen to the San Diego Padres in exchange for Austin Hedges, Josh Naylor, Cal Quantrill, Gabriel Arias, Owen Miller, and Joey Cantillo. Prior to the 2021 season, Waldron began throwing knuckleballs. He opened the 2021 season with the High–A Fort Wayne TinCaps and was promoted to the Double–A San Antonio Missions in July. He finished the season starting twenty games going 3–8 with a 4.25 ERA and 103 strikeouts over 103 2/3 innings.

Waldron returned to San Antonio to begin 2022 and was promoted to the Triple–A El Paso Chihuahuas in late June. Over 25 starts between the two teams, he went 5–10 with a 6.26 ERA and 96 strikeouts over 113 2/3 innings. To open the 2023 season, he was assigned to El Paso. In 14 games (12 starts), Waldron struggled to a 1–6 record and 7.02 ERA with 75 strikeouts in 66 2/3 innings pitched.

On June 23, 2023, the Padres announced they would be promoting Waldron to make his major league debut the next day as the team's starting pitcher. He made his debut at Petco Park against the Washington Nationals. Waldron pitched 4 2/3 innings, allowing four hits and two runs (both earned), while striking out two Nationals batters in a 2–0 loss. He was the first pitcher to throw a knuckleball in a major league game since Baltimore Orioles’ pitcher Mickey Jannis in June 2021. He was optioned back to El Paso the next day. Waldron was recalled to the majors several times throughout the remainder of the 2023 season, making eight appearances (six starts) going 1–3 with a 4.35 ERA and 31 strikeouts over 41 1/3 innings.

Waldron opened and spent much of the 2024 season as a member of San Diego's starting rotation. On August 22, 2024, he was optioned to Triple-A El Paso. Waldron appeared in 27 games (26 starts) for the Padres and went 7-11 with a 4.91 ERA and 133 strikeouts over 146 2/3 innings. With El Paso, he started four games and had a 4.58 ERA.

On March 15, 2025, Waldron suffered a left oblique muscle strain during a spring training outing, causing him to begin the season on the injured list. He was transferred to the 60-day injured list on April 11. Waldron was activated from the injured list on June 1 and optioned to El Paso. Waldron was recalled on June 30 make his major league season debut as San Diego's starting pitcher versus the Philadelphia Phillies. He gave up four runs, six walks, and struck out three batters in a 4-0 loss. Following the game, he was optioned to Triple-A El Paso. His only major league appearance during the 2025 season, he finished with a 0–1 win-loss record and 7.71 ERA. In the minor leagues, he pitched 90 1/3 innings across 21 starts with the Arizona Complex League Padres, San Antonio, and El Paso, going 7-4 with a 6.48 ERA and 85 strikeouts.

On February 24, 2026, Waldron was shut down indefinitely by the Padres after undergoing a procedure for a hemorrhoid. He was activated from the injured list on April 17 to make his season debut as the Padres' starter versus the Los Angeles Angels. He was placed back on the injured list with a right brachialis muscle injury on May 15. Waldron was activated and returned to the Padres' active roster on July 11. He made 10 appearances (including three starts) for San Diego, but struggled to a 1–2 record and 7.16 ERA with 28 strikeouts across 32 2/3 innings pitched. On July 28, Waldron was designated for assignment by the Padres.

=== Toronto Blue Jays ===
On August 5, 2026, Waldron was claimed off waivers by the Toronto Blue Jays. He pitched in four games for Toronto and allowed five runs with two strikeouts across 4 1/3 innings. Waldron was designated for assignment by the Blue Jays on August 19.

=== Washington Nationals ===
On August 22, 2026, Waldron was claimed off of waivers by the Washington Nationals. He made three scoreless appearances for the Nationals. On September 8, he was placed on the 15-day injured list with chest inflammation. He was subsequently transferred to the 60-day injured list on September 12, ending his season.

== Pitching style ==
Unlike other recent knuckleball pitchers like R. A. Dickey and Tim Wakefield—both of whom relied heavily on throwing knuckleballs—Waldron's primary pitch is a four-seam fastball. His off-speed pitches are a slider and a knuckleball.

== Personal life ==
Waldron's twin brother, Mike, also played on the Nebraska baseball team.

== See also ==
- List of knuckleball pitchers
