= Danny Boone =

American baseball player (born 1954)

- Pitcher
- Born: January 14, 1954 (age 72); Long Beach, California, U.S.
- Batted: Left Threw: Left

MLB debut
- April 11, 1981, for the San Diego Padres

Last MLB appearance
- September 30, 1990, for the Baltimore Orioles

MLB statistics
- Win–loss record: 2–1
- Earned run average: 3.36
- Strikeouts: 57
- Stats at Baseball Reference

Teams
- San Diego Padres (1981–1982); Houston Astros (1982); Baltimore Orioles (1990)

Daniel Hugh Boone (born January 14, 1954) is a former professional baseball pitcher. He pitched parts of three seasons in Major League Baseball, appearing in 1981, 1982, and 1990. At 5'8" and 150 lbs., he was considered small for a player. He is probably best known for the eight-year gap between his major league stints, and the improbable comeback that led him to his time with the Baltimore Orioles in 1990.

== Playing career ==
=== Draft ===
Coming out of Cal State Fullerton, Boone was selected in the second round of the 1976 Major League Baseball draft by the California Angels. This was actually the fifth time Boone had been drafted, as he had been selected after each of his four years in college as well as the secondary phase draft in January 1976. It was also the third time he was drafted by the Angels, who selected him in both 1973 and 1974, but he only signed after this draft.

=== San Diego Padres ===
Boone's early promise went unfulfilled for several years, as he washed out of the Angels' system when he was released at the end of spring training in 1980. He was signed just three days later by the San Diego Padres, where he made his major league debut the following April. Boone pitched in 37 games for the Padres in 1981, winning 1 game, losing none, and collecting two saves with a decent 2.84 ERA.

Boone began the next season with the Padres as well, but pitched sparingly, making only 10 appearances over the first two months of the season.

=== Houston Astros and return to minors ===
On June 8, he was traded to the Houston Astros for infielder Joe Pittman, and after a handful of appearances in June was returned to the minor leagues. After a September call-up, he started the 1983 season back in the minors and was released in June.

Boone signed a minor league contract with the Milwaukee Brewers, spending about a year in their farm system before being released once again. For the next five years, he dropped off the radar of American professional baseball.

=== MLB comeback: knuckleball and Baltimore Orioles ===
Then, in 1989 while working as a drywall installer in San Diego, a new league started that gave Boone a new lease on his career: the Senior Professional Baseball Association. His former MLB teammate, John D'Acquisto, was playing in the SPBA and recommended him to his team. Boone signed on with the Bradenton Explorers, where he showed off a new pitch in his arsenal: the knuckleball. He pitched well enough for them (4–3, 3.16 ERA) to get a contract offer from the Baltimore Orioles, and in September 1990 he was back in the majors. He pitched in four games, including his first-ever major league start against the Cleveland Indians on September 30, in which he did not receive a decision.

Boone's comeback drew some attention, and he even was labeled a "Rookie Prospect" on the 1991 Score baseball card set at the age of 36. However, his September 1990 start turned out to be his last major league appearance, as he did not make the Orioles team that spring, and after a second stint with the Explorers, Boone's career was largely over.

Boone was a replacement player for the Padres in 1995, in line to start on Opening Day before the MLB strike ended.

== See also ==
- List of knuckleball pitchers
- List of Major League Baseball replacement players
