= Jared Fernández =

American baseball player (born 1972)

Jared Fernandez
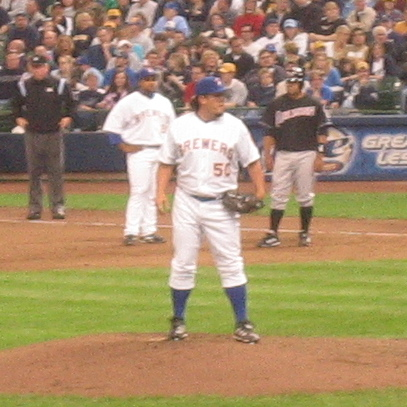
- Fernandez with the Milwaukee Brewers in 2006
- Pitcher
- Born: February 2, 1972 (age 54); Salt Lake City, Utah, U.S.
- Batted: Right Threw: Right

Professional debut
- MLB: September 19, 2001, for the Cincinnati Reds
- NPB: April 8, 2007, for the Hiroshima Toyo Carp

Last appearance
- MLB: May 11, 2006, for the Milwaukee Brewers
- NPB: September 22, 2007, for the Hiroshima Toyo Carp

MLB statistics
- Win–loss record: 4–7
- Earned run average: 5.05
- Strikeouts: 61

NPB statistics
- Win–loss record: 3–8
- Earned run average: 6.04
- Strikeouts: 33
- Stats at Baseball Reference

Teams
- Cincinnati Reds (2001–2002); Houston Astros (2003–2004); Milwaukee Brewers (2006); Hiroshima Toyo Carp (2007)

Jared Wade Fernandez (born February 2, 1972) is a Hispanic American former Major League Baseball knuckleball pitcher who last pitched in 2007 for the Hiroshima Toyo Carp of Japan's Central League.

Fernandez attended Fresno State University and in 1994, the right-handed hitting and throwing Fernandez was signed as an undrafted free agent by the Boston Red Sox. He played in their organization until 2000, when he was signed by the Cincinnati Reds to a minor league contract. He made his major league debut with the Reds on September 19, 2001.

He spent 2001 and 2002 bouncing up and down between the Reds' Triple-A team, Louisville, and the major league team. In December 2002, he was signed by the Houston Astros after he filed for free agency. In 2003 and 2004, he again bounced between the majors and minors.

In 2005, he spent the season in the minors with the Scranton/Wilkes-Barre Red Barons, in the Phillies organization.

In 2006, Fernandez was signed by the Milwaukee Brewers and won a bullpen spot out of spring training. After a few bad outings he was sent down to the Triple-A Nashville Sounds. In the 2006 offseason, he was a pitcher for the Dominican team, Aguilas Cibaeñas, where he was subsequently released in midseason.

On December 11, 2006, Fernandez signed a one-year, $200,000 contract with the Hiroshima Carp of Japan.

== Honors and awards ==
- In 1994, he was a Western Athletic Conference All-Star.

== See also ==
- List of knuckleball pitchers
