= Vince Ventura =

American baseball player

- Left fielder
- Born: April 18, 1917; New York, New York, U.S.
- Died: September 11, 2001 (aged 84); Lake Worth, Florida, U.S.
- Batted: Right Threw: Right

MLB debut
- May 8, 1945, for the Washington Senators

Last MLB appearance
- June 15, 1945, for the Washington Senators

MLB statistics
- Batting average: .206
- Home runs: 0
- Runs batted in: 2
- Stats at Baseball Reference

Teams
- Washington Senators (1945)

Vincent Ventura (April 18, 1917 – September 11, 2001) was an American professional baseball left fielder. He played in Major League Baseball (MLB) for the Washington Senators for 18 games during the 1945 season, the last year of the World War II manpower shortage.

Born in New York City, Ventura threw and batted right-handed, stood 6 feet 1 inch (1.85 m) tall and weighed 190 pounds (86 kg). His pro career began in 1937 and included two seasons in the New York Yankees' farm system before Washington acquired his contract. He spent 1941 and 1942 with the Class A1 Chattanooga Lookouts, then served in the United States Army Air Forces during both 1943 and 1944 before his discharge. He made his MLB debut on May 8, 1945, in a pinch hitting role against the St. Louis Browns at Sportsman's Park, singling off Nels Potter in a 7–1 Washington defeat. He appeared in 17 more games through June 15, starting 12 games in left field, before returning to Chattanooga.

With Washington, Ventura batted .207 in 58 at-bats, with four runs scored and two RBI. All of his 12 hits were singles. He left pro baseball after the 1945 campaign. He died in Lake Worth, Florida on September 11, 2001.

Ventura first signed in the minor leagues in 1937. He stated years later: "Phil (Rizzuto) and I had to bring our fathers with us to sign because we were both underage. We both received thousand-dollar bonuses. Five-hundred upon signing and the other five-hundred if we were still with the team on July 1, the last cutdown date. My father cried when he got the check for five-hundred dollars. He had never seen that much money in his life. When he was able to get work, he earned twelve to fourteen-dollars a week."
