= Float serve =

One of the types of serves in the game of volleyball

The float serve is one of the types of serves in the game of volleyball. The serve involves hitting the volleyball in such a way to minimize the rotation of the ball, causing unpredictability in the ball’s movement and is akin to baseball's knuckleball. During this serve, the ball is moving in the air without spin, allowing drag, lift, and turbulent air flow to have a big effect on its movement. When done correctly, the float serve is hard for opponents to predict where the ball will end up, thus rendering it hard to pass. The effectiveness of the float serve is determined by its ability to succeed in an ace, or winning the point by serving over the net and having the ball hit the ground before the opponent can touch it.

== Factors ==
=== Rotation of volleyball ===
Float serves are only possible with minimal to no spin of the volleyball while it is moving in the air. Unlike a topspin serve, which uses the spin of the ball to create a constant difference in pressure that drives the ball downward at a high speed, the float serve can be affected in any direction by the random forces of the air and pressure (drag, lift, drag crisis, turbulence) because there is no rotation of the ball to create different speeds at different points in the air surrounding the volleyball.

=== Speed of volleyball and its effect on surrounding air ===
The speed of the ball is an important factor in determining whether or not the volleyball will float. The slower the ball is moving in the air, the higher the drag coefficient and thus drag will be. The faster the ball is moving in the air, the lower the drag coefficient and drag will be. With lower drag coefficients, the air surrounding the volleyball is less likely to be able to hold onto the surface of the ball.

When talking about the air flowing around the ball, there are generally two types; laminar and turbulent. When the volleyball is moving at a lower speed, the air surrounding the ball is in laminar flow, meaning the boundary layers of air are uniform. At a higher speed, specifically called the critical speed (which varies with different conditions), the air around the volleyball is unable to stay uniform and breaks apart into a state called turbulent flow.

=== Surface patterns ===
The seams and panels of a volleyball can change the speed of the air near the ball's surface, speeding the ball up or slowing it down, depending on whether said seams are on the top or the bottom. Experimental results show that balls with panels had the highest critical speed threshold, leading to unpredictable flight patterns. Honeycomb-patterned balls have a much lower critical threshold, while the dimpled pattern increased the threshold. Using a hexagonal or dimpled pattern instead could significantly increase the consistency of its flight instead of the most commonly used volleyballs which have six panels with three parallel rectangular strips.

== Air flow ==
=== Turbulent flow around the volleyball ===
For a volleyball, once it reaches the critical speed, the air surrounding the ball breaks from laminar flow into this turbulent flow, causing all of the air trailing directly behind it to behave like chaotic vortices. These vortices assist in the random points of lift on the ball while in the air. This along with the decrease in drag coefficient contributes to the random movement of the volleyball, which results in the ball moving left, right, up, down, or a combination of them all. As the volleyball moves through the air, it disturbs the air. This disturbance results in an aerodynamic force on the ball, which can be broken down into the lift and drag. As the air surrounding the volleyball transitions from laminar to turbulent flow, also known as the drag crisis, the erratic movement of the trailing air causes lift in the ball at random locations, leading to random movement of the ball. In this turbulent state, the drag coefficient and drag also decreases, which causes more sporadic motion.

=== Reynolds Number ===
There is also a number used to predict the beginning of turbulent flow. This number is the Reynolds number, which is determined by the speed, viscosity, density of fluid and the size of the object it collides with. The Reynold’s number is a ratio of inertial forces to viscous forces, and specifically for a volleyball in motion in the air, is found by the product of mass density of air, diameter of the ball, and the ball’s velocity, all divided by the viscosity of the air. A low Reynold’s number corresponds to laminar flow, whereas a high Reynold’s number corresponds to turbulent flow.

== Execution ==
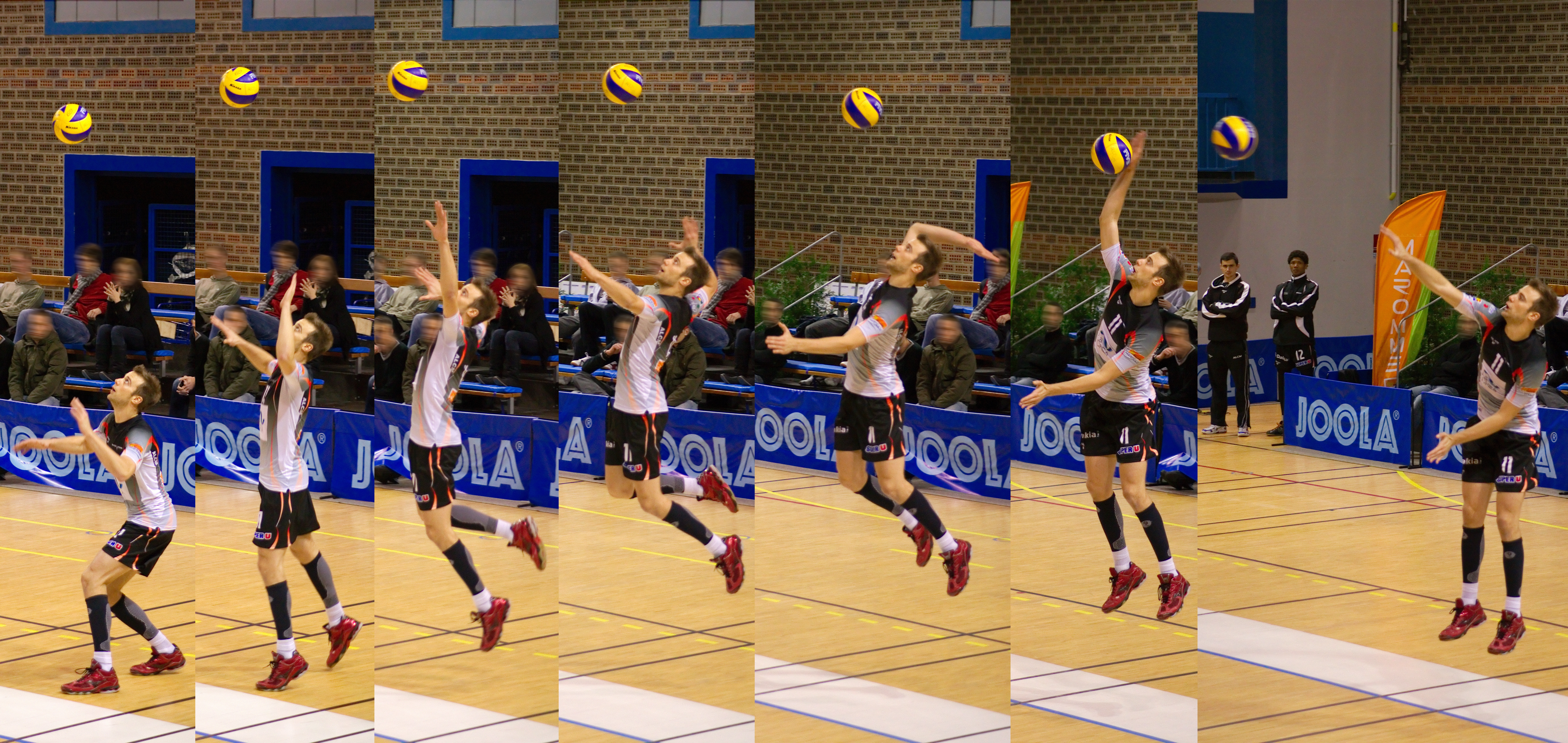

In order to serve the volleyball so that it floats, the ball must be moving in the air with minimal spin. To achieve this the server follows a set of specific techniques;

- Tossing the ball to the same height as maximum vertical arm length, with the non-hitting hand, and without spin
- Hitting the ball between the top and center of the palm, while maintaining a firm wrist, and full extension of the hitting arm
- Hitting the ball in the center of the volleyball, while pushing straight through towards the intended serving zone
- After contact is made with the ball, following through with the hitting arm, towards the direction of the ball, past the hips
- Having a high elbow and wrist

The combination of these mechanics allows the server to hit the ball in such a way that it moves with minimal spin after contact is made with the hand.
