= George Kottaras =

Canadian baseball player (born 1983)

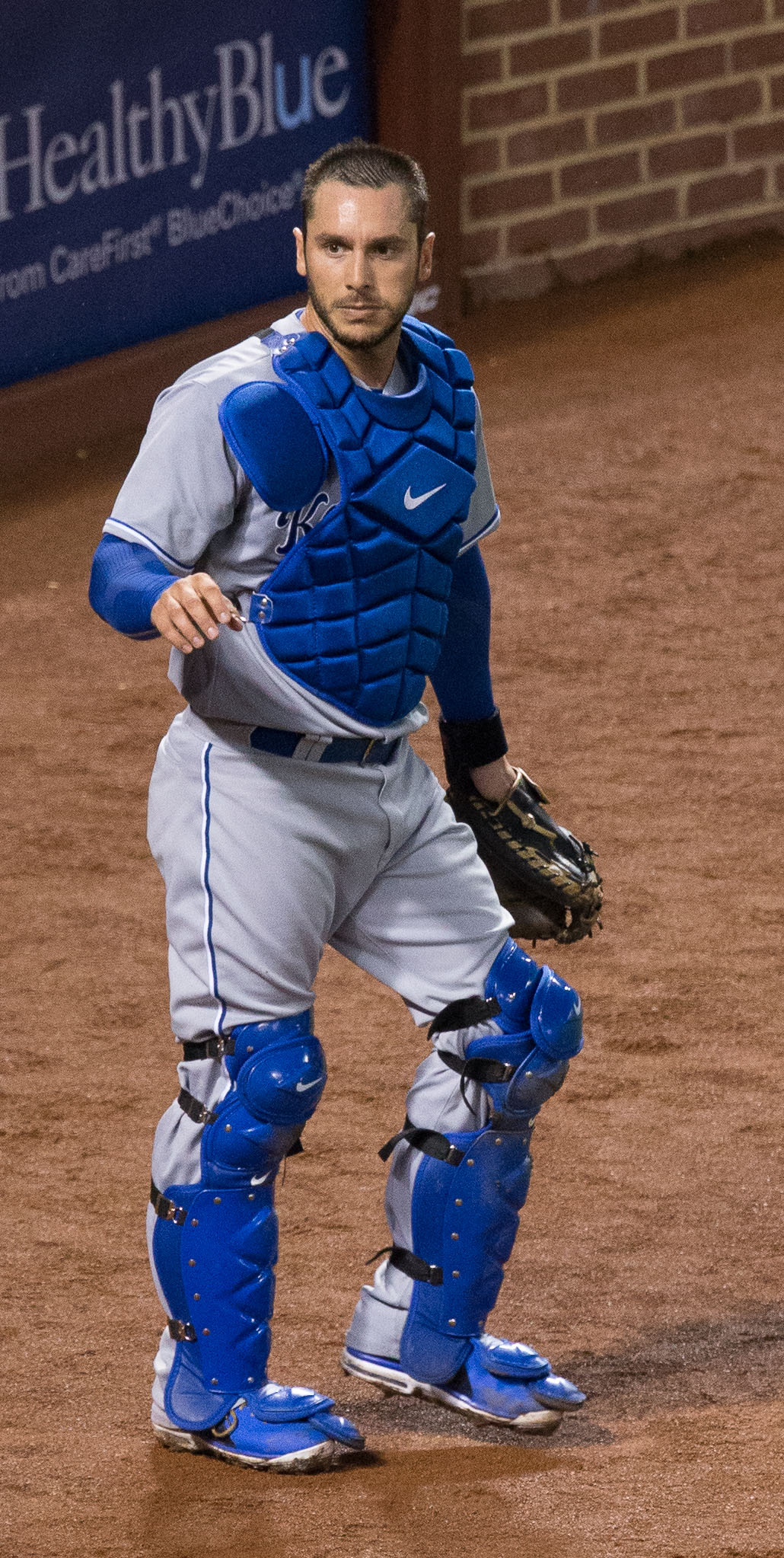
- Kottaras with the Kansas City Royals
- Catcher
- Born: May 10, 1983 (age 43); Scarborough, Ontario, Canada
- Batted: Left Threw: Right

MLB debut
- September 13, 2008, for the Boston Red Sox

Last MLB appearance
- September 28, 2014, for the Toronto Blue Jays

MLB statistics
- Batting average: .215
- Home runs: 32
- Runs batted in: 101
- Stats at Baseball Reference

Teams
- Boston Red Sox (2008–2009); Milwaukee Brewers (2010–2012); Oakland Athletics (2012); Kansas City Royals (2013); Cleveland Indians (2014); St. Louis Cardinals (2014); Toronto Blue Jays (2014)
Medals
Men's baseball
Representing Greece
European Baseball Championship
Silver medal – second place	2003 Netherlands	National team

George Kottaras (/kəˈteɪrəs/ kə-TAY-rəs; born May 10, 1983) is a Canadian-Greek former professional baseball catcher. He played in Major League Baseball (MLB) for the Boston Red Sox, Milwaukee Brewers, Oakland Athletics, Kansas City Royals, Cleveland Indians, St. Louis Cardinals, and Toronto Blue Jays.

== Personal life ==
Both of Kottaras' parents were born in Greece, but settled in the Toronto, Ontario, suburb of Scarborough, where he was born. He attended Milliken Mills High School in nearby Markham.

== Professional career ==
=== San Diego Padres ===
Kottaras was drafted by the San Diego Padres in 20th round of the 2002 MLB draft. He signed with the Padres in May 2003 after spending one year at Connors State College in Warner, Oklahoma.

Kottaras began his professional career playing for the Idaho Falls Padres of the Pioneer League, and worked his way up through the Padres minor league system to the Triple-A Portland Beavers in 2006. He played in the 2006 All-Star Futures Game for Team World and was named number 48 in the 2006 Minor League News FAB50 List.

=== Boston Red Sox ===
On September 5, 2006, he was traded to the Boston Red Sox to complete an August 31 deal for David Wells and was immediately added to the team's 40-man roster. He was assigned to the Red Sox Double A franchise, the Portland Sea Dogs, who had just begun their Eastern League playoff run. Kottaras arrived for Game 2 of Eastern League Division Playoffs and continued playing with the Sea Dogs until they were crowned 2006 Eastern League Champions.

Kottaras played the entire 2007 season for the Triple-A Pawtucket Red Sox. He reported for spring training in 2008 but was optioned back to Pawtucket on March 17, 2008. Kottaras played the regular and post season 2008 schedule for Pawtucket.

Then, after Pawtucket was eliminated from the International League playoffs, he was called up from Pawtucket to MLB on September 8, 2008, and on September 13, 2008, made his MLB debut in the sixth inning of a game against the Toronto Blue Jays and scored the only run for the Red Sox that game.

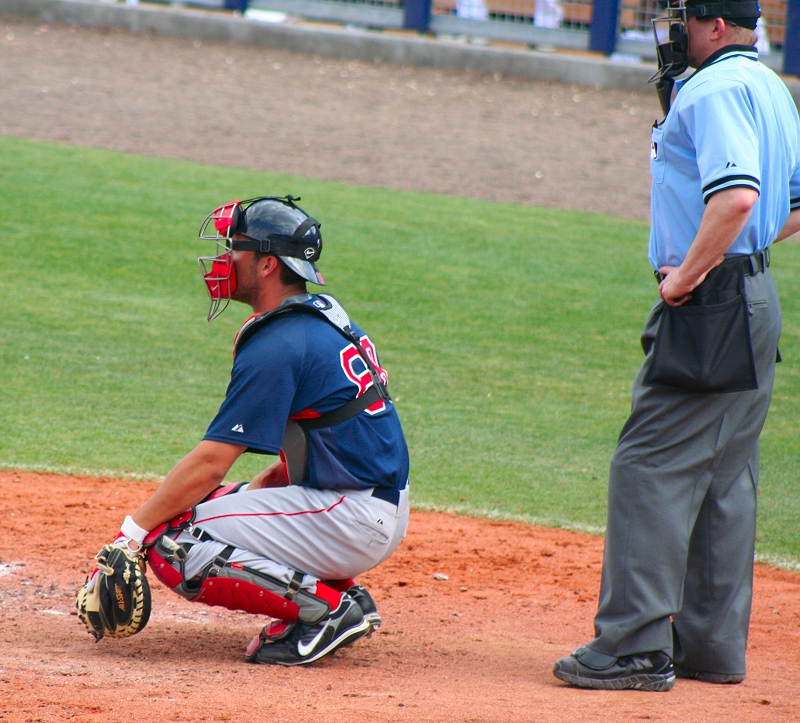
Kottaras playing for the Boston Red Sox in 2009 spring training

In 2009, Kottaras was knuckleball pitcher Tim Wakefield's personal catcher; while Jason Varitek caught the other pitchers in the rotation. After Wakefield went on the disabled list after the All-Star break, Kottaras followed suit with a lower back strain. He remained with Pawtucket until call ups on September 1. With Wakefield's first start in September, Red Sox manager Terry Francona had to decide whether to start Kottaras due to his familiarity with Wakefield or Víctor Martínez due to his bat and having made one start with Wakefield in which he caught the knuckleball very well for the first time. Francona eventually chose Martínez.

Kottaras hit his first MLB home run on July 3, 2009, against the Seattle Mariners' Mark Lowe in the bottom of the 11th. For the season, he finished fifth in the league in passed balls, recording eight in 39 games.

Kottaras was placed on release waivers by the Red Sox on November 18, 2009.

=== Milwaukee Brewers ===
Kottaras was claimed off waivers by the Milwaukee Brewers hours after being placed on release waivers by Boston on November 18.

On September 3, 2011, Kottaras hit for the cycle in a game against the Houston Astros, becoming the seventh Brewer to do so, and the third Brewers catcher to achieve the feat (along with Chad Moeller and Charlie Moore).

In 2011, Kottaras batted .252 and hit five home runs in 111 at bats.

On December 12, 2011, Kottaras avoided arbitration by signing a one-year deal. He was designated for assignment on July 26, 2012.

=== Oakland Athletics ===
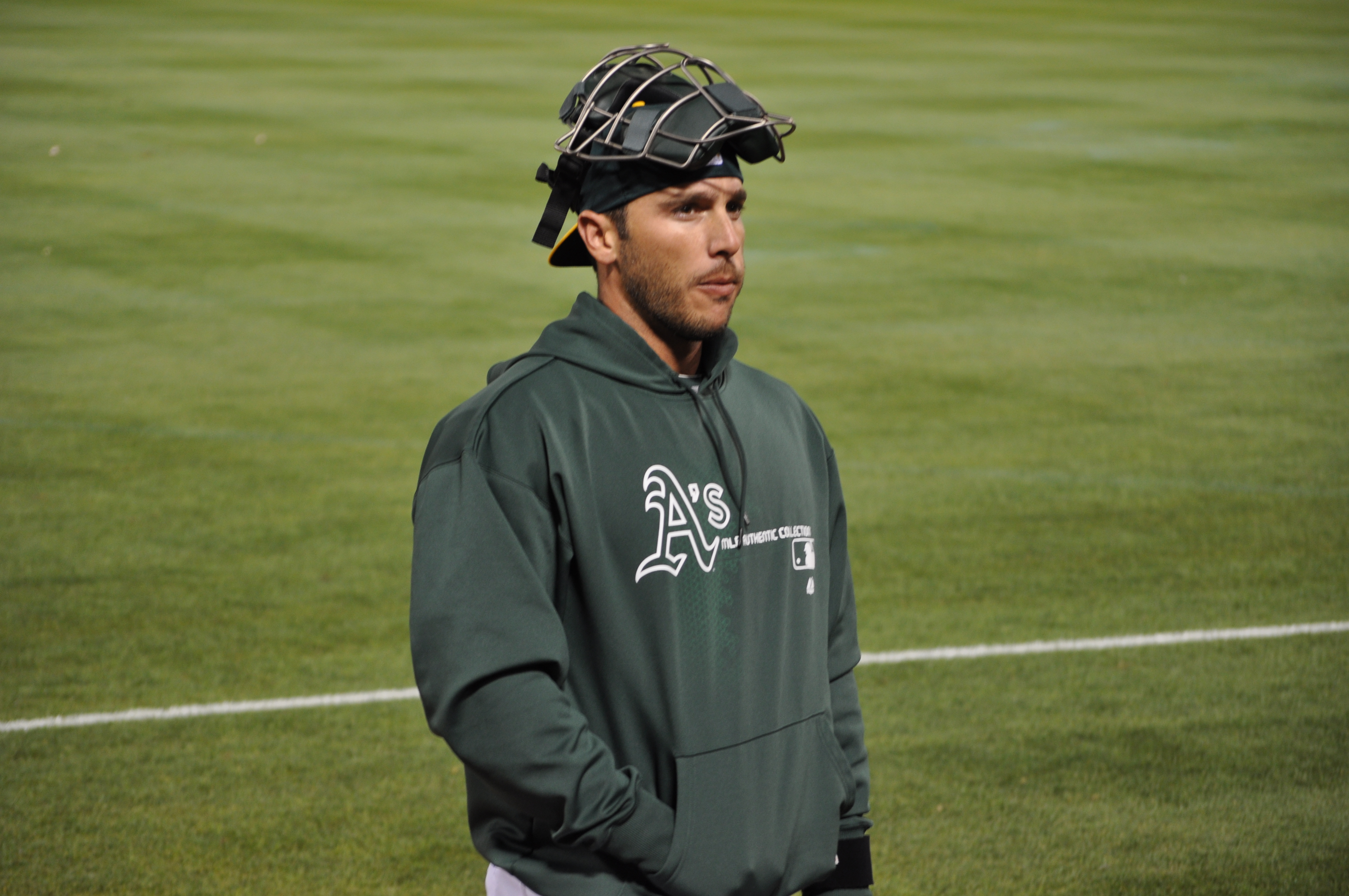
Kottaras with the Oakland Athletics in 2012

On July 27, 2012, Kottaras was traded to Oakland for pitcher Fautino de los Santos.

On January 14, 2013, Kottaras agreed to a one-year deal to avoid arbitration. Just a day after agreeing to that contract, Kottaras was designated for assignment to clear a roster spot for the newly acquired John Jaso.

=== Kansas City Royals ===
On January 25, 2013, Kottaras was claimed off waivers by the Kansas City Royals. In 2013, his locker was assigned next to Mike Moustakas, who is also of Greek descent. "I don't know how many times you've had two Greek guys in the same clubhouse on the same team," Kottaras said. "And they put us next to each other, which makes it even better." He was designated for assignment on November 21, 2013.

=== Chicago Cubs ===
Kottaras was traded from the Royals to the Chicago Cubs for cash considerations on November 26, 2013. On December 2, Kottaras signed a one-year deal with the Cubs for $1.075 million, avoiding arbitration. He was released on March 26, 2014.

=== Cleveland Indians ===
On March 30, 2014, Kottaras signed a minor league contract with the Cleveland Indians. He played in 9 games with the Triple-A Columbus Clippers before being added to the Indians' 40-man roster in time for the game on May 3, 2014. He was designated for assignment three days later. He was assigned to Columbus on May 11, and re-added to the Cleveland roster on May 27. Kottaras was the only player to hit two home runs in his first two plate appearances as an Indian. On July 7, he was designated for assignment following the acquisition of Chris Dickerson.

=== St. Louis Cardinals ===
Kottaras was claimed by the St. Louis Cardinals on July 11, 2014. On July 26, Kottaras was designated for assignment. He was released on July 29.

=== Toronto Blue Jays ===
On August 6, 2014, Kottaras signed a minor league contract with the Toronto Blue Jays. He was activated by the Triple-A Buffalo Bisons on August 10. He was called up to the Blue Jays on September 1, when the rosters expanded. Kottaras made his debut for the Blue Jays on September 17, grounding out in his only at-bat against the Baltimore Orioles. He made his first start for Toronto on September 25, catching Daniel Norris in his first MLB start. Kottaras went 0–4 as a member of the Blue Jays, and finished the season with a .233 average, three home runs, and 5 RBI. He was sent outright to the Buffalo Bisons on October 3, but elected to become a free agent rather than accepting the assignment.

=== Chicago White Sox ===
On December 18, 2014, Kottaras signed a minor league contract with the Chicago White Sox that included an invitation to spring training. He was released on August 3, 2015.

=== Return to Toronto ===
On August 5, 2015, Kottaras signed a minor league contract with the Toronto Blue Jays. He elected free agency on November 7.

=== San Francisco Giants ===
On January 21, 2016, Kottaras signed a minor league contract with the San Francisco Giants. He was released on July 14 after hitting .155 with the Triple-A Sacramento River Cats.

=== Atlanta Braves ===
On July 16, 2016, Kottaras signed a minor league contract with the Atlanta Braves. He was released on August 19.

== International career ==
In 2004, Kottaras played for the Greece national baseball team during the 2004 Summer Olympics. His eligibility came from his parents, both of whom are Greek immigrants to Canada. During the Olympics, Kottaras served as a first baseman and backup catcher. On July 21, 2004, Kottaras had three hits helping Greece to come from behind to defeat Italy 11–7 for the team's first and only win in the tournament.

Also, Kottaras played for the Canada national baseball team at the 2017 World Baseball Classic.

== See also ==
- List of Major League Baseball players to hit for the cycle

Achievements
Preceded by Carlos González	Hitting for the cycle September 3, 2011	Succeeded by Pablo Sandoval
