= Roger Wolff =

American baseball player (1911–1994)

- Pitcher
- Born: April 10, 1911; Evansville, Illinois, U.S.
- Died: March 23, 1994 (aged 82); Chester, Illinois, U.S.
- Batted: Right Threw: Right

MLB debut
- September 20, 1941, for the Philadelphia Athletics

Last MLB appearance
- August 25, 1947, for the Pittsburgh Pirates

MLB statistics
- Win–loss record: 52–69
- Earned run average: 3.41
- Strikeouts: 430
- Stats at Baseball Reference

Teams
- Philadelphia Athletics (1941–1943); Washington Senators (1944–1946); Cleveland Indians (1947); Pittsburgh Pirates (1947)

Roger Francis Wolff (April 10, 1911 – March 23, 1994) was an American professional baseball player. A right-handed knuckleball pitcher, he appeared in 182 games over all or part of seven seasons in Major League Baseball between 1941 and 1947: three with the Philadelphia Athletics, three with the Washington Senators, and one season split between the Cleveland Indians and the Pittsburgh Pirates. Wolff was born in Evansville, Illinois; he was listed as 6 feet (1.8 m) tall and 208 pounds (94 kg).

== Baseball career ==
Wolff's professional career began in 1930 and he spent 12 full seasons in the minor leagues before getting his first major-league opportunity at the end of the 1941 season, starting two games for Connie Mack's Philadelphia Athletics. He was charged with the loss in each contest, but threw two complete games and compiled a decent 3.18 earned run average. The remainder of his pro career would be spent as a major leaguer, initially during the manpower shortage caused by World War II. He lost a combined 45 games during the three seasons of 1942 through 1944 (winning 26), but in 1945—the last wartime season—he would experience a dramatic turnaround in performance.

=== Stellar 1945 campaign ===
As a member of Washington's four-knuckleball-pitcher starting rotation (along with Mickey Haefner, Dutch Leonard and Johnny Niggeling), Wolff helped lead the Senators to a second-place finish, only 11/2 games behind the eventual world champion Detroit Tigers. He posted a 20–10 won–lost record and a 2.12 earned run average, and placed in the American League's Top 10 in multiple statistical categories:

- Most Valuable Player (seventh)
- Wins Above Replacement (sixth, with 5.6; third in WAR for pitchers, with 6.0)
- Games Won (third, with 20)
- Winning Percentage (sixth, with .667)
- Walks Plus Hits Per Inning Pitched (first, with 1.012)
- Earned Run Average (third, with 2.12)
- Strikeouts (tied for fifth, with 108)
- Complete Games (tied for third, with 21)
- Shutouts (tied for fourth, with four)
- Innings Pitched (sixth, with 250)

Wolff threw a one-hit shutout on June 19 against Philadelphia at Griffith Stadium, allowing only a fourth-inning double to Hal Peck. No All-Star Game was played in 1945 due to travel restrictions caused by the war. Wolff returned to the Senators' rotation in 1946 and led the staff with a 2.58 ERA in 122 innings pitched, but he fashioned only a 5–8 won–lost mark. He was traded to Cleveland in March 1947, and worked in 20 games for the Indians and Pirates before leaving pro baseball.

Wolff's career won–lost record was 52–69 with an earned run average of 3.41. In 182 games, including 128 starts, he compiled 63 complete games, eight shutouts and 12 saves, allowing 1,018 hits and 316 bases on balls, with 430 strikeouts, in 1,0251/3 innings pitched.

After baseball, he worked in private business and was the longtime athletic director at the Southern Illinois Penitentiary. He died at age 82 in Chester, Illinois.

== See also ==
- 1945 Washington Senators season
- List of knuckleball pitchers
