= Tim Wakefield =

American baseball player (1966–2023)

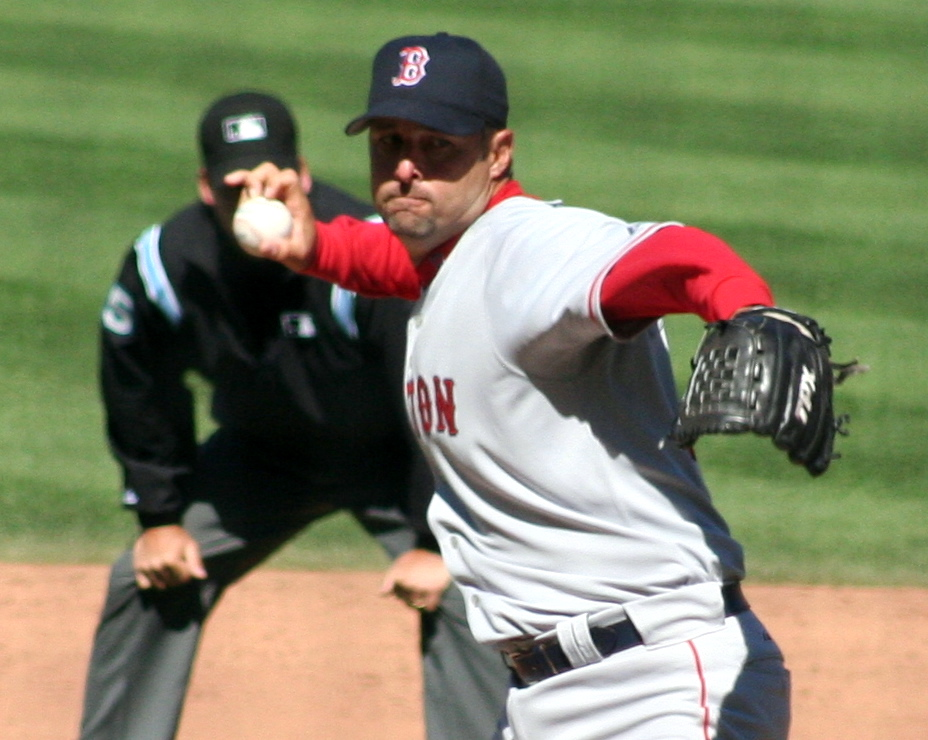
- Wakefield pitching for the Red Sox in 2006
- Pitcher
- Born: August 2, 1966; Melbourne, Florida, U.S.
- Died: October 1, 2023 (aged 57); Hingham, Massachusetts, U.S.
- Batted: Right Threw: Right

MLB debut
- July 31, 1992, for the Pittsburgh Pirates

Last MLB appearance
- September 25, 2011, for the Boston Red Sox

MLB statistics
- Win–loss record: 200–180
- Earned run average: 4.41
- Strikeouts: 2,156
- Stats at Baseball Reference

Teams
- Pittsburgh Pirates (1992–1993); Boston Red Sox (1995–2011)

Career highlights and awards
- All-Star (2009); 2× World Series champion (2004, 2007); Roberto Clemente Award (2010); Boston Red Sox Hall of Fame

Timothy Stephen Wakefield (August 2, 1966 – October 1, 2023) was an American professional baseball knuckleball pitcher. Wakefield began his Major League Baseball (MLB) career with the Pittsburgh Pirates, but is most remembered for his 17-year tenure with the Boston Red Sox, where he was a part of two World Series championships in 2004 and 2007. When he retired at age 45 after 19 seasons in MLB, Wakefield was the oldest active player in the major leagues.

Wakefield won his 200th career game on September 13, 2011, and he ranks third in career wins in Red Sox franchise history (186), behind Cy Young and Roger Clemens. He is second in all-time wins at Fenway Park with 97, behind Clemens's 100, and is the all-time leader in innings pitched by a Red Sox pitcher, with 3,006, having surpassed Clemens's total of 2,777 on June 8, 2010. Wakefield was an All-Star in 2009 and he won the Roberto Clemente Award in 2010.

== Early life ==
Timothy Stephen Wakefield was born on August 2, 1966, in Melbourne, Florida. He attended Eau Gallie High School and then attended Florida Institute of Technology, where he played college baseball for the Florida Tech Panthers. At Florida Tech, he was named the Panthers' team most valuable player as a first baseman in his sophomore and junior years. He set a single-season Panthers record with 22 home runs, as well as the career home run record at 40. In 2006, his uniform number, No. 3, was retired by the college.

== Professional career ==
=== Draft and minor leagues ===
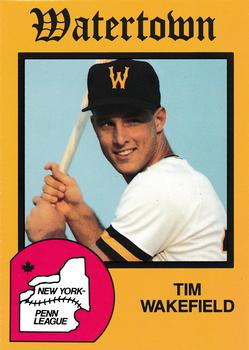
Wakefield's first baseball card, with the Watertown Pirates in 1988

The Pittsburgh Pirates selected Wakefield as a first baseman in the eighth round of the 1988 MLB draft. He received a $15,000 signing bonus from the Pirates.

Wakefield's knack for pitching was noticed in Bradenton by manager Woody Huyke, who encouraged him to "take a try at it." Playing with the Short Season A Welland Pirates during the 1989 season, that opportunity arose several times, with Wakefield called in from positional play for relief pitching duties. On July 1, Wakefield's stellar relief performance turned an almost-certain blowout loss into a near upset. As a Welland Pirate he pitched nearly 40 innings with a 3.40 ERA.

After a scout told him that he would never get above Double-A ball as a position player with his skills, Wakefield decided to re-invent himself as a knuckleball pitcher.

The following season, Wakefield made his professional pitching debut while playing for the Single-A Salem Buccaneers. His immediate success led to a full conversion to pitcher in 1990, and he led the Carolina League in starts and innings pitched. Wakefield advanced to Double-A in 1991, leading all Pirates minor leaguers in wins, innings pitched, and complete games when he went 15–8 with a 2.90 earned run average.

==== 1992–1994 ====
In 1992, Wakefield began the season with the Triple-A Buffalo Bisons of the American Association. He registered a league-high six complete games by July 31—winning 10 games with a 3.06 earned run average—and was called up to the majors.

=== Pittsburgh Pirates (1992–1993) ===
In his major league debut, Wakefield threw a complete game against the St. Louis Cardinals, striking out 10 batters while throwing 146 pitches.

Down the stretch, Wakefield provided a boost for the playoff-bound Pirates, starting 13 games and compiling an 8–1 record with a 2.15 earned run average, a performance that won him the National League Rookie Pitcher of the Year Award from The Sporting News. After winning the National League East division, the Pirates faced the Atlanta Braves in the National League Championship Series. Wakefield won both of his starts against Braves star Tom Glavine, throwing a complete game five-hitter in Game 3 of the NLCS and another complete game in Game 6 on three days' rest. The Braves would win Game 7 to advance to the World Series.

The Pirates named Wakefield their Opening Day starter for the 1993 season. Wakefield walked nine batters on Opening Day. After losing his spot in the starting rotation, Wakefield was sent down to Double-A in July. He was recalled in September and struggled again, finishing the season with a 6–11 record and a 5.61 earned run average.

Wakefield spent most of 1994 with Triple-A Buffalo. He led the league in losses, walks, and home runs allowed. Wakefield was recalled to the Pirates in September but he did not play due to the players strike. The Pirates released Wakefield on April 20, 1995.

=== Boston Red Sox (1995–2011) ===
Six days after being released from the Pirates, Wakefield was signed by the Boston Red Sox. He worked with Phil and Joe Niekro, two former knuckleballers, who encouraged him to use the knuckleball as an out pitch. With the Triple-A Pawtucket Red Sox, Wakefield went 2–1 with a 2.52 earned run average.

==== 1995–1998 ====
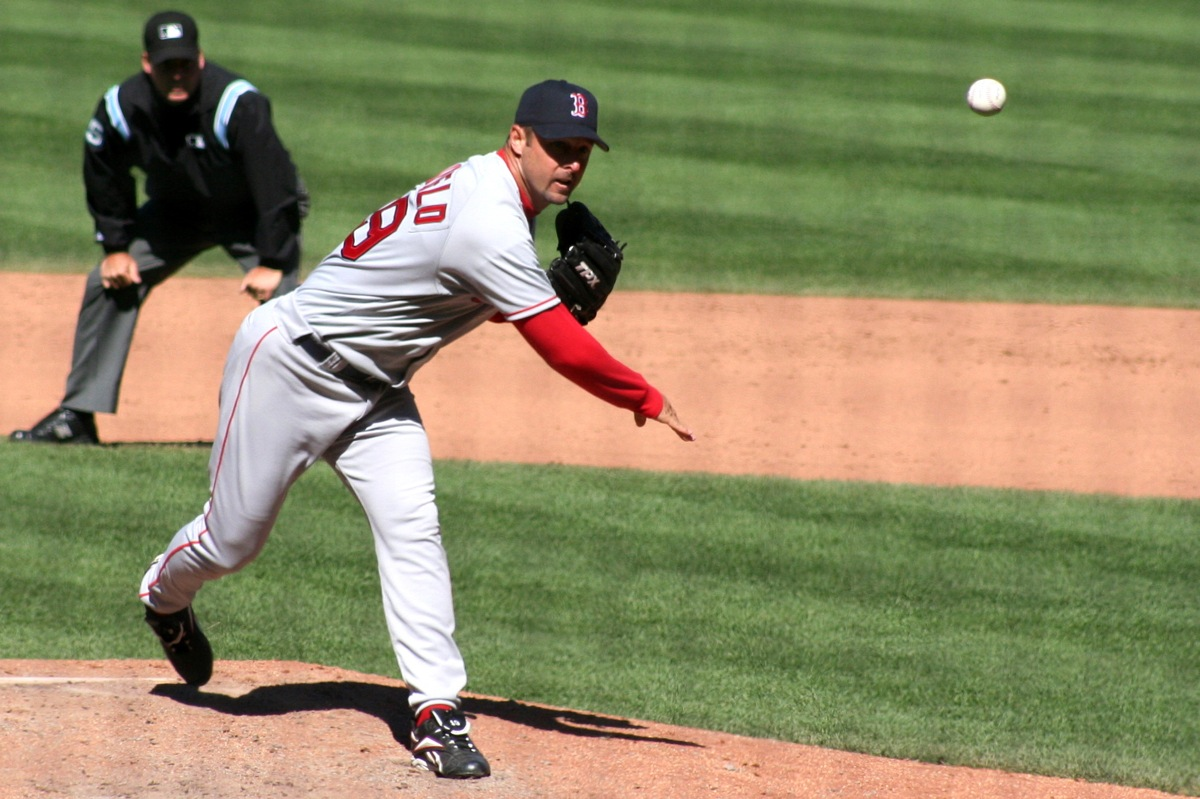
Wakefield with the Red Sox

With the Boston Red Sox rotation struggling from injuries to top of the rotation starters Roger Clemens and Aaron Sele early in the 1995 season, Wakefield was called up from Triple-A, and soon proved to be their most dependable starter. He began the season with a 1.65 earned run average and a 14–1 record through 17 games, six of which were complete games. He ended the year 16–8 with a 2.95 earned run average, helping the Red Sox win the American League East division title, and capturing the Sporting News American League Comeback Player of the Year. He finished third in the AL Cy Young Award balloting.

Over the next three seasons (1996–1998), Wakefield won 43 games and had earned run averages of 5.14, 4.25, and 4.58 over that time as a starter. In 1997, he led Major League Baseball by hitting 16 batters with a pitch. He would repeat this feat in 2001 plunking a career-high 18 batters.

==== 1999–2002 ====
In 1999, Boston's closer Tom Gordon was injured and manager Jimy Williams installed Wakefield as the new closer during the middle part of the season. On August 10, 1999, he joined a select group of pitchers who have struck out four batters in one inning. Because the fluttering knuckleball produces many passed balls, several knuckleballers share this honor with him. He recorded 15 saves before Derek Lowe emerged as the new closer and Wakefield returned to the starting rotation.

Because of his success out of the bullpen, Wakefield was regularly moved from the position of relief pitcher to starter and back again over the next three seasons (2000–2002). He made 15 starts in 2002.

==== 2003–2008 ====
Wakefield returned to Boston's starting rotation permanently in 2003. In that season's American League Championship Series, he allowed four runs over 14 innings against the New York Yankees. He started Games 1 and 4 of the series against Mike Mussina and won both starts. He was also called in to pitch in extra innings of Game 7, after the Yankees tied the game. The Red Sox had been leading 5–2 in the eighth inning. After retiring the side in order in the 10th, Wakefield gave up a home run to Aaron Boone on his first pitch of the 11th, sending the Yankees to the World Series. Wakefield apologized to fans after the game.

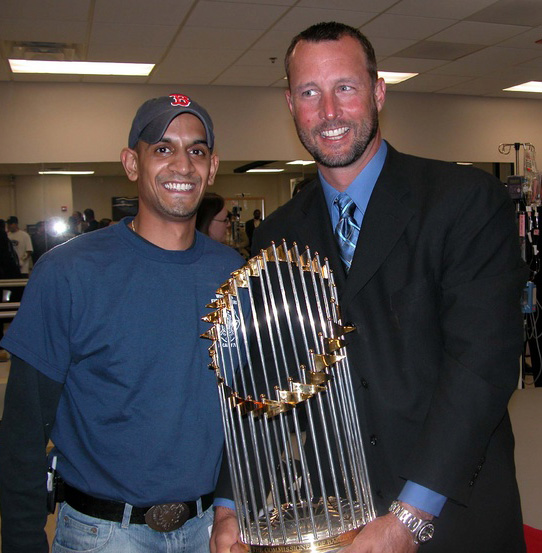
Wakefield (right) holding the 2004 World Series Trophy

In 2004, Wakefield helped the Red Sox win the American League Championship Series against the Yankees, a best-of-seven series to advance to the World Series. The Red Sox lost the first two games of the American League Championship Series and were losing badly in Game 3 when Wakefield asked to be put into the game to save the other pitchers for the next day. He pitched 3 1/3 innings which prevented him from starting Game 4. Derek Lowe started Game 4 in his place which the Red Sox ultimately won. In Game 5, Wakefield again pitched out of the bullpen and was the winning pitcher in a 14-inning game, throwing three shutout innings as the Red Sox won 5–4. The Red Sox beat the Yankees and went on to the World Series. He pitched Game 1 of the 2004 World Series, but did not get a decision as Boston defeated the St. Louis Cardinals, 11–9, which was the highest-scoring Game 1 in World Series history. The Red Sox swept the Cardinals for their first World Series title in 86 years.

On April 19, 2005, Wakefield agreed to a $4 million, one-year "rolling" contract extension that gave the Red Sox the ability to keep Wakefield for the rest of his career. In the 2005 season, Wakefield led the Red Sox pitching staff with 16 wins and a 4.15 earned run average. On September 11, 2005, he set a career high in strikeouts (12) in a 1–0 complete game loss to the New York Yankees.

In 2007, Wakefield finished the season with a 17–12 record and started Game 4 of the American League Championship Series, taking the loss, but was left off the Red Sox roster for the World Series due to an injured shoulder that had been bothering him since late September.

The 12 passed balls while he was pitching topped the majors in 2008.

==== 2009 ====
Wakefield entered his 15th season with the Boston Red Sox in 2009. On April 15, at age 42, he became the oldest Red Sox pitcher to pitch a complete game. The bullpen had pitched 11 innings of relief the prior day, and Wakefield told manager Terry Francona not to remove him after he gave up his first hit in the eighth inning. Wakefield broke his own record in his next start when he pitched a second consecutive complete game win, this time in a seven-inning, rain-shortened game.

Wakefield led the team with a 10–3 record through June 27. With his start on July 3, 2009, Wakefield surpassed Roger Clemens for the most starts in franchise history. His success on the mound had him atop the major leagues with 10 wins at the time of the 2009 All-Star selection. On July 5, 2009, he was announced as an AL All-Star, making him the second-oldest first-time All-Star at 42, behind only Satchel Paige who was 45. By the All-Star break, Wakefield possessed a major league-best 11–3 record. Wakefield did not see action in St. Louis, as he was not needed by Joe Maddon. On July 21, Wakefield was placed on the disabled list due to a lower back strain. He returned from the disabled list on August 26 against the Chicago White Sox, pitching seven innings while allowing one earned run to earn a no decision.

==== 2010 ====
Wakefield entered his 16th season with the Boston Red Sox in 2010. He began the year in the starting rotation until Daisuke Matsuzaka came off the disabled list. He later rejoined the rotation due to an injury to Josh Beckett. On May 12, Wakefield recorded his 2,000th career strikeout against Vernon Wells of the Toronto Blue Jays in a 3–2 loss. He joined Jamie Moyer, Javier Vázquez, and Andy Pettitte as the only active pitchers with at least 2,000 career strikeouts. On June 8, Wakefield passed Roger Clemens for the most innings pitched by a Red Sox pitcher. He went on to win that game 3–2 over the Cleveland Indians. On June 13, Wakefield joined Moyer and Pettitte as the only active pitchers with 3,000 innings pitched. He accomplished this feat by retiring Shane Victorino of the Philadelphia Phillies on a fly ball to left. On July 2, he surpassed Clemens for another record, this for starts at Fenway Park; he went eight innings to win 3–2 over the Baltimore Orioles.

On September 8, against the Tampa Bay Rays, he became the oldest Red Sox pitcher ever to win a game; he is also the oldest player to appear in a game for the Red Sox at Fenway.

On October 28, before Game 2 of the 2010 World Series, Wakefield received the Roberto Clemente Award.

==== 2011 ====
Wakefield's 2011 season was followed in the documentary film Knuckleball! Wakefield started his seventeenth season in a Red Sox uniform as a reliever, but injuries to John Lackey and Daisuke Matsuzaka moved him into the starting rotation.

On May 11, 2011, Wakefield pitched 1 1/3 innings in relief as the Toronto Blue Jays defeated the Red Sox 9–3 at the Rogers Centre. He became, at 44 years, 282 days, the oldest player ever to appear for the Red Sox. At the All-Star break, Wakefield had a 5–3 record with a 4.74 earned run average. On July 24, 2011, while pitching against the Seattle Mariners, Wakefield recorded his 2,000th strikeout in a Red Sox uniform against Mike Carp; he also recorded his 199th career win in that game.

It took Wakefield eight attempts to earn his 200th career win after his 199th, finally doing so in an 18–6 rout over the Toronto Blue Jays at Fenway Park on September 13, 2011. The victory came at a time when the Red Sox were in dire need of wins, with the Tampa Bay Rays gaining substantial ground in the race for the American League wild card as Boston fell four games behind the New York Yankees in the AL East division standings. Boston eventually missed the playoffs by one game, and Wakefield ended the season at 7–8 with a 5.12 earned run average.

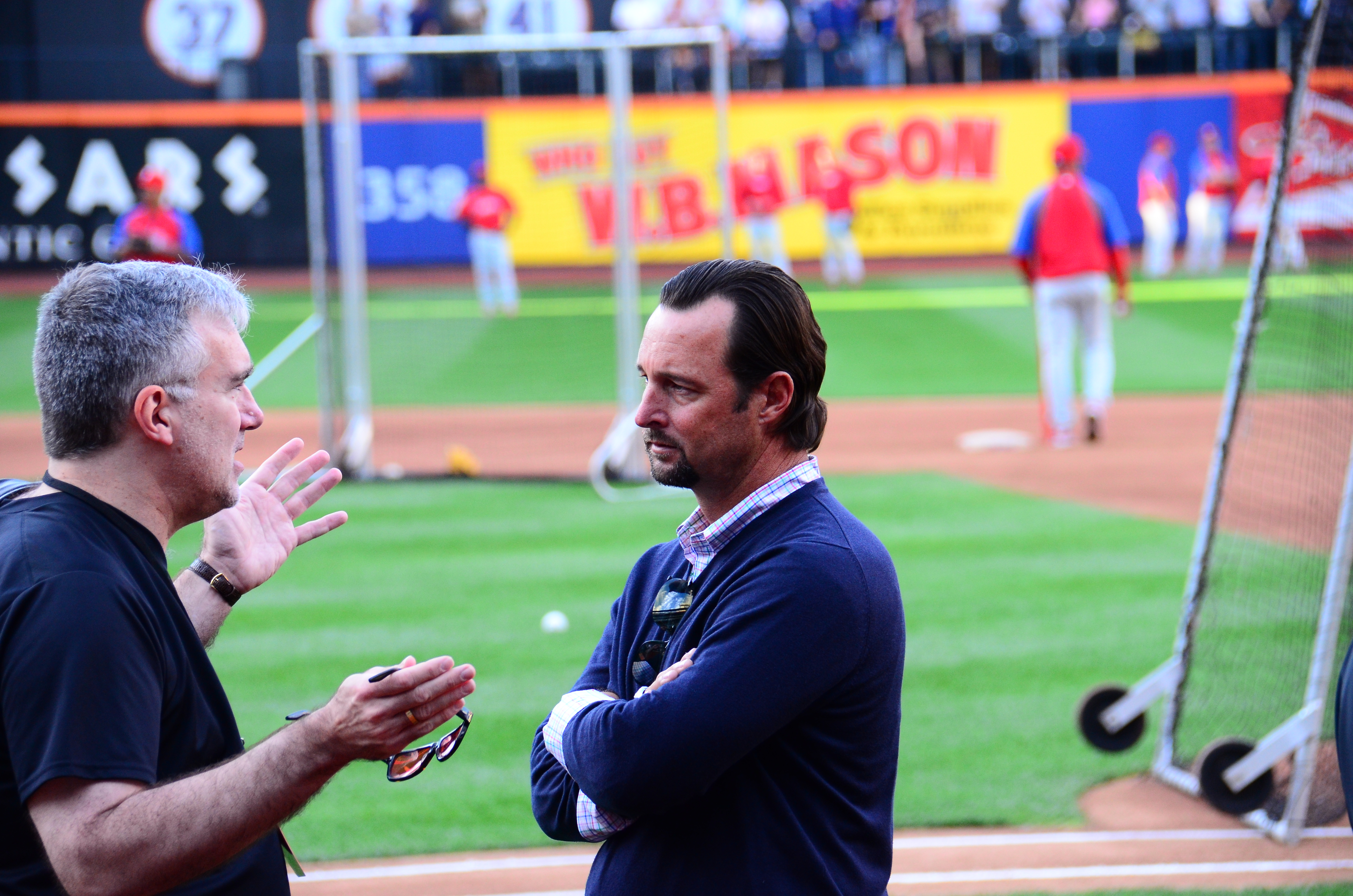
Wakefield (right) with journalist Keith Olbermann in 2012

For the 2012 season, Wakefield was offered a minor league contract, with an invitation to spring training, by the Red Sox. Wakefield announced his retirement on February 17, 2012.

Wakefield finished his Red Sox career third in wins (behind Roger Clemens and Cy Young), second in strikeouts (behind Clemens), second in game appearances by a pitcher (behind reliever Bob Stanley), first in games started as a pitcher, and first in innings pitched.

== Playing style ==
=== Pitching style ===
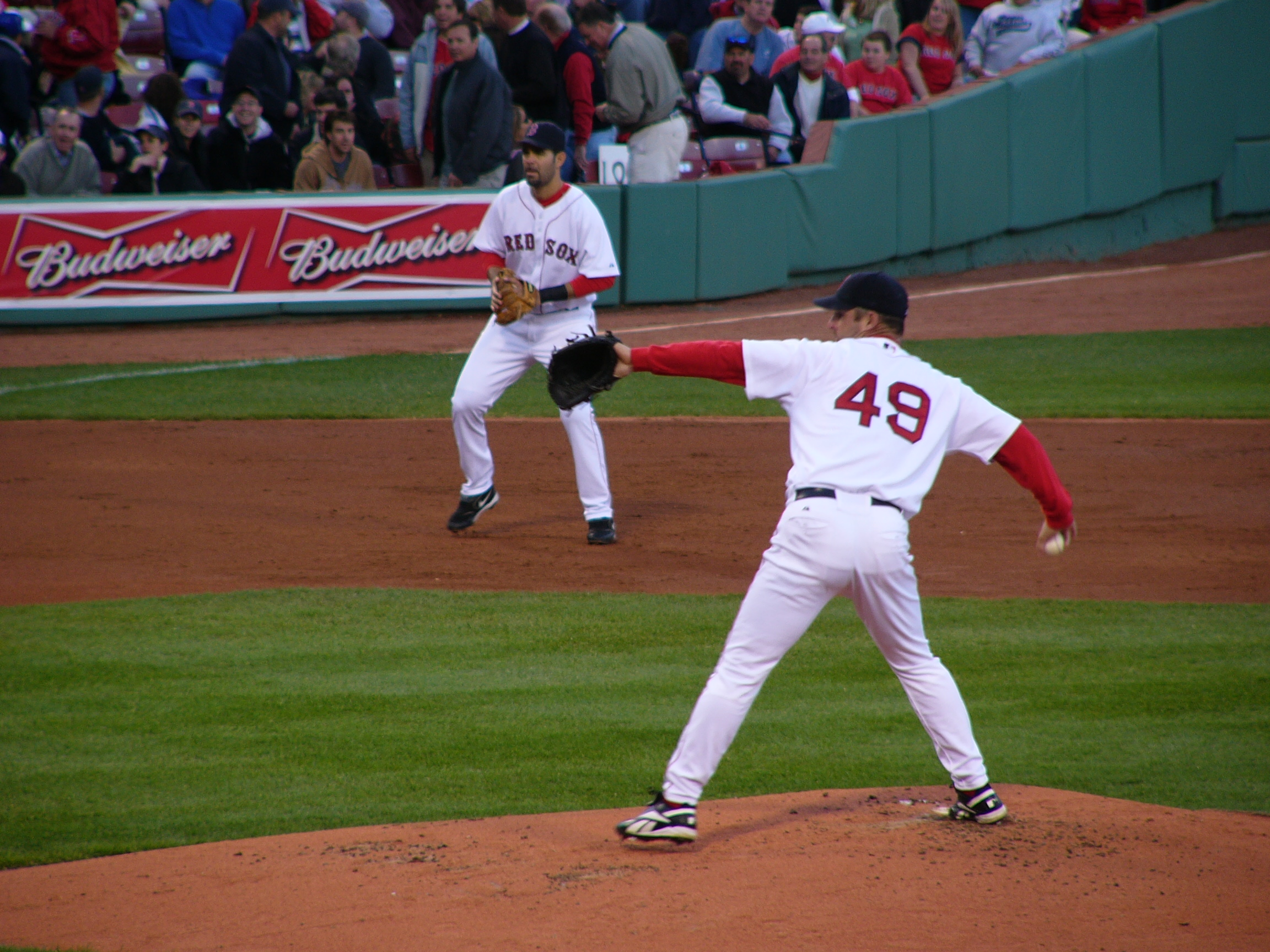
Wakefield throwing a knuckleball in a 2006 game

Wakefield pitched with a 3/4-overhand motion. Wakefield's primary pitch, the knuckleball, was usually thrown between 63 and 70 miles per hour (101 and 113 km/h) and had a great deal of variance in how much it "fluttered". As with all knuckleballs, the flutter depended on a variety of factors including pitch velocity, temperature, humidity, precipitation (both type and intensity), air resistance, wind speed, wind direction, the condition of the ball, and very small changes in his grip or the orientation of the seams. Wakefield also featured a 71–75 miles per hour (114–121 km/h) fastball and a seldom-used curveball which averaged between 57 and 61 miles per hour (92 and 98 km/h).

Knuckleball pitchers are traditionally believed to be able to pitch more frequently and for more pitches per game than conventional pitchers. Throughout the first decade of his career, Wakefield followed a similar pattern: on April 27, 1993, he threw 172 pitches over 10+ innings in a game for the Pittsburgh Pirates against the Atlanta Braves. In his first two weeks with the Red Sox, Wakefield pitched a total of 33 1/3 innings, including two complete games in addition to a 7 1/3-inning emergency start on just two days' rest. As late as the 2003 and 2004 American League Championship Series, Wakefield was making relief appearances between starts. In the later years of his career, the Red Sox generally treated Wakefield more like conventional pitchers in terms of pitch count, rarely allowing him to pitch more than about 110 pitches per game, and giving him four days of rest. Also, because of the relatively low wear on their pitching arms, knuckleball pitchers tend to have longer professional careers than most other pitchers.

At the time of his retirement, Wakefield was seventh on the all-time hit batters list.

=== Personal catcher ===
Because of the difficulty of catching a knuckleball, the Red Sox sometimes carried a backup catcher who specialized in defense and who caught most or all of Wakefield's starts. For several years, his personal catcher was Doug Mirabelli, who used a league-approved mitt similar to a softball catcher's mitt for catching Wakefield. Josh Bard briefly caught Wakefield during the first month of the 2006 season, before Boston reacquired Mirabelli on May 1 after trading him to San Diego the previous offseason. Mirabelli was released in the spring of 2008 and Wakefield's catcher was Kevin Cash during 2008. George Kottaras became his personal catcher in 2009. Victor Martinez was acquired by the Red Sox on July 31, 2009, and began catching for Wakefield on August 26, 2009. Martinez experimented catching Wakefield's pitches with various gloves and mitts before settling on a first baseman's mitt.

Due to injuries to both Martinez and Jason Varitek, Boston reacquired Cash from the Houston Astros on July 1, 2010, to serve as Wakefield's catcher as well as the primary catcher. Martinez became Wakefield's catcher once more when he returned. In 2011, Wakefield began the season in the bullpen and both Jarrod Saltalamacchia and Jason Varitek caught him when he entered games. When Wakefield returned to the rotation, Saltalamacchia was the catcher in each game he started.

== Post-MLB career ==
In June 2012, Wakefield joined NESN as a studio analyst for Red Sox coverage. He continued to serve as a studio analyst through the 2023 season.

In August 2015, Wakefield signed on as a spokesperson for Farmington Bank, making appearances at branch grand openings and in television, radio, and print advertisements.

== Personal life ==
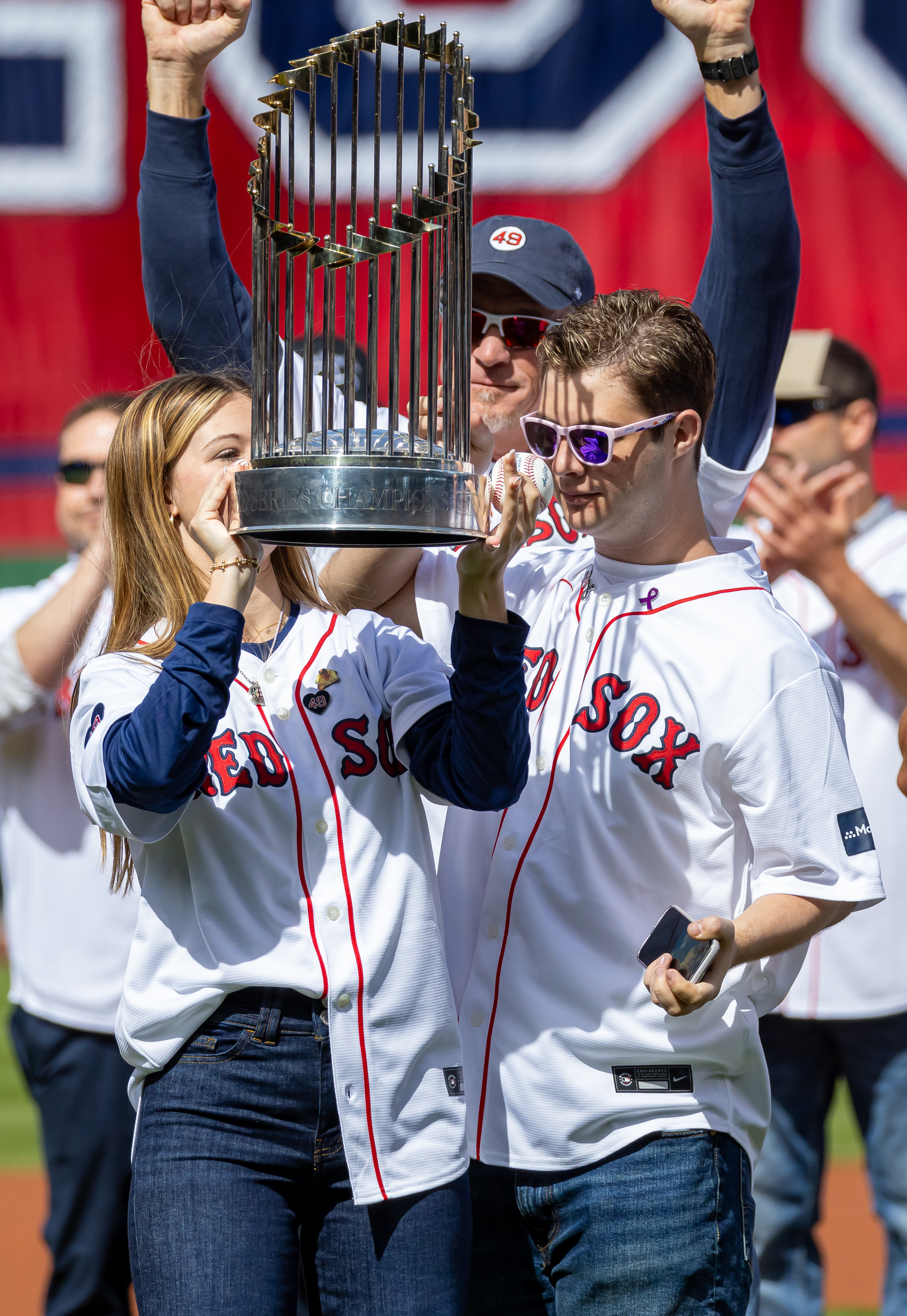
Wakefield's children lifting the Commissioner's Trophy at Fenway Park in 2024

Wakefield became an evangelical Christian in 1990. Wakefield met his wife, Stacy Stover, in Massachusetts and they were married on November 9, 2002. They had two children, a son (born 2004) and a daughter (born 2005). In 2010, Wakefield bought a house in Indian Harbour Beach, Florida, for $1,825,000. Wakefield was part owner of a restaurant in Pembroke, Massachusetts, called Turner's Yard. One of his partners in the restaurant was National Hockey League player Shawn Thornton.

=== Philanthropy ===
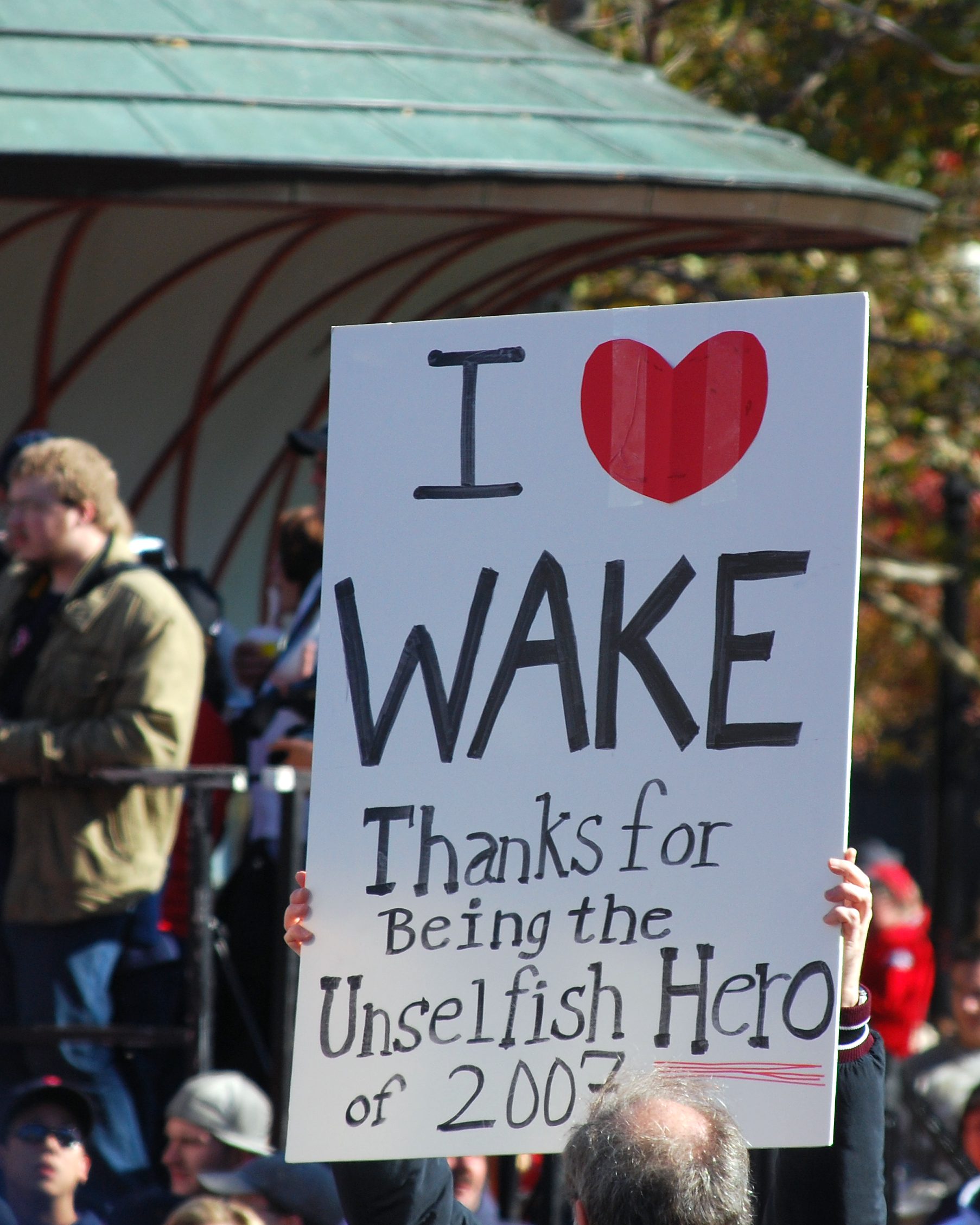
A sign for Wakefield at the 2007 World Series Rolling Rally celebration

Wakefield was nominated eight times by the Red Sox for the Roberto Clemente Award, presented to the player who best reflects the spirit of giving back to the community, winning the award in 2010. Wakefield partnered with the Franciscan Hospital for Children in Boston to bring patients to Fenway Park to share time with him on and off the field.

Wakefield hosted an annual celebrity golf tournament, raising over $10 million for the Space Coast Early Intervention Center, a pre-school program for children with special needs.

Wakefield was also active with New England's Pitching In for Kids organization, a program dedicated to improving the lives of children across the New England region, and the Touch 'Em All Foundation founded by Garth Brooks.

In 2007, Wakefield released a charity wine called CaberKnuckle, in association with Longball Vineyards, with 100% of the proceeds supporting Pitching in for Kids; the wine raised more than $100,000.

In 2013, the Red Sox named Wakefield Honorary Chairman of the Red Sox Foundation. In that role, Wakefield supported fundraising events, community service days, and personal visits.

== Death ==
On October 1, 2023, Wakefield died at his home in Massachusetts of a seizure resulting from brain cancer. He was 57. The cancer diagnosis had been revealed days earlier by Curt Schilling, Wakefield's former Red Sox teammate, stirring controversy because the release of this news was not authorized by Wakefield or his family.

On February 28, 2024, his widow, Stacy Wakefield, died from pancreatic cancer at the age of 53.

On March 18, 2024, the Red Sox announced that they would be wearing his uniform number as a patch for the entirety of the 2024 season.

On April 9, 2024, the 2004 Red Sox reunited at Fenway Park for their 20th anniversary celebration on Opening Day against the Orioles. The pregame ceremony was also dedicated to the Wakefields, along with Red Sox president Larry Lucchino, who died of heart failure on April 2 at the age of 78. Wakefield's children led the 2024 team in from left field. His daughter threw the ceremonial first pitch to Jason Varitek.

== See also ==
- Boston Red Sox Hall of Fame
- List of Boston Red Sox team records
- List of knuckleball pitchers
- List of Major League Baseball career wins leaders
- List of Major League Baseball career strikeout leaders
- List of Major League Baseball career hit batsmen leaders
- List of oldest Major League Baseball players
- List of Major League Baseball single-inning strikeout leaders
