= Mickey Haefner =

American baseball player (1912–1995)

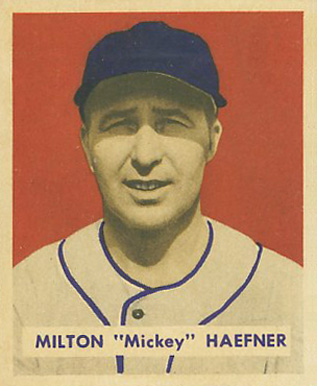
- Pitcher
- Born: October 9, 1912; Lenzburg, Illinois, U.S.
- Died: January 3, 1995 (aged 82); New Athens, Illinois, U.S.
- Batted: Left Threw: Left

MLB debut
- April 22, 1943, for the Washington Senators

Last MLB appearance
- September 28, 1950, for the Boston Braves

MLB statistics
- Win–loss record: 78–91
- Earned run average: 3.50
- Strikeouts: 508
- Stats at Baseball Reference

Teams
- Washington Senators (1943–1949); Chicago White Sox (1949–1950); Boston Braves (1950)

Milton Arnold "Mickey" Haefner (October 9, 1912 – January 3, 1995) was an American knuckleball-throwing left-handed pitcher who played eight seasons in Major League Baseball between 1943 and 1950, six and a half of them with the Washington Senators (1943–1949), later joining the Chicago White Sox (1949–1950) and Boston Braves (1950). He was known as one of four knuckleball hurlers who were regular starting pitchers for the 1945 Senators, the last Washington team to seriously contend for the American League pennant. He was born in Lenzburg, Illinois, and was listed as 5 feet 8 inches (1.73 m) tall and 160 pounds (73 kg), leading to his baseball moniker, Itsy-Bitsy.

== Baseball career ==
Haefner's professional career did not begin until 1937, when he was 24. After five straight seasons of double-digit victories in minor league baseball, he was acquired by Washington in February 1943. As a rookie, he worked in 36 games, with 13 starts, and put up an 11–5 won–lost record and a 2.29 earned run average in 1651/3 innings pitched. He was third in the Junior Circuit in ERA and fourth in winning percentage (.688), while the Senators ended up second in the league to the New York Yankees—albeit by a distant, 131/2-game margin. His workload increased in 1944, the first of three straight seasons in which he exceeded more than 225 innings pitched.

In 1945, knuckleball aces Haefner, Dutch Leonard, Johnny Niggeling and Roger Wolff started 111 of the Senators' 154 games and accounted for 60 of the club's 87 victories, as Washington contended for the American League title up until the closing day of the season, before finishing 11/2 lengths behind the Detroit Tigers. Haefner went 16–14 (3.47) with 19 complete games and three saves. In 1946, the first postwar season with many military veterans returning to major league service, Haefner continued his effective pitching, winning 14 games in 25 decisions and posting a 2.85 earned run average with 17 complete games. He won ten more games in 1947 before his performance declined to a poor 15–32 record over his final three MLB seasons. However, on May 10, 1949, against the defending world champion Indians at Cleveland Stadium, Haefner threw a complete game one-hitter for a 1–0 victory. Only Baseball Hall of Famer Larry Doby's first-inning single prevented Haefner from throwing a no-hitter. A little over two months later, on July 21, the Senators sold his contract to the White Sox.

In eight seasons and 261 career games pitched, Haefner compiled a 78–91 record with an earned run average of 3.50. He had 91 complete games, 13 shutouts and 13 saves. Haefner allowed 1,414 hits and 577 bases on balls, with 508 strikeouts, in 1,4662/3 MLB innings pitched.

== 1946 exhibition game ==
Although never formally selected to an All-Star team, Haefner was part of a select American League squad that played a "scrimmage" against the league champion Boston Red Sox prior to the 1946 World Series. The Red Sox were idle while the Brooklyn Dodgers and St. Louis Cardinals engaged in the best-of-three 1946 National League tie-breaker series to determine the championship of the Senior Circuit. Haefner earned a measure of notoriety when, during the tune-up exhibition game at Fenway Park on October 1, he accidentally plunked Red Sox superstar Ted Williams on the elbow with an errant knuckleball. The injured Williams was ineffective in the ensuing World Series, batting only .200 with five singles, as the underdog Cardinals defeated Boston in seven games.

Mickey Haefner's professional career ended in 1951, ironically in the Red Sox' minor-league system, after 15 seasons. He died in New Athens, Illinois, the hometown of Hall of Fame manager Whitey Herzog, at age 82 on January 3, 1995.

== See also ==
- 1945 Washington Senators season
