= Walt Chipple =

American baseball player

- Center fielder
- Born: September 26, 1918; Utica, New York, U.S.
- Died: June 8, 1988 (aged 69); Tonawanda, New York, U.S.
- Batted: Right Threw: Right

MLB debut
- April 17, 1945, for the Washington Senators

Last MLB appearance
- June 23, 1945, for the Washington Senators

MLB statistics
- Batting average: .136
- Home runs: 0
- Runs batted in: 5
- Stats at Baseball Reference

Teams
- Washington Senators (1945)

Walter John Chipple (born Walter John Chlipala; September 26, 1918 – June 8, 1988) was an American Major League Baseball center fielder who played for the Washington Senators in 1945.

Chipple was born in Utica, New York but raised in Black Rock, Buffalo. He attended school via the Church of the Assumption and at McKinley Vocational High School before dropping out to enter the workforce upon the death of his father. After working his way through the minor leagues to the Washington Senators in 1945, he was drafted to serve in World War II with the United States Navy. He spent only two months in the Navy and was stationed at Naval Training Station Sampson. After receiving a medical discharge due to an ankle injury, he returned to the United States and resumed playing in the minors. During his playing career, he worked as a shipping clerk. After his playing days ended, he continued to manage in the minors. He was a member of the Knights of Columbus chapter affiliated with a church in Kenmore, New York at the time of his death.
