= Johnny Niggeling =

American baseball player (1903–1963)

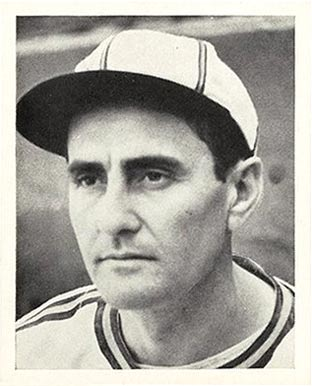
- Pitcher
- Born: July 10, 1903; Remsen, Iowa, U.S.
- Died: September 16, 1963 (aged 60); Le Mars, Iowa, U.S.
- Batted: Right Threw: Right

MLB debut
- April 30, 1938, for the Boston Bees

Last MLB appearance
- September 1, 1946, for the Boston Braves

MLB statistics
- Win–loss record: 64–69
- Earned run average: 3.22
- Strikeouts: 620
- Stats at Baseball Reference

Teams
- Boston Bees (1938); Cincinnati Reds (1939); St. Louis Browns (1940–1943); Washington Senators (1943–1946); Boston Braves (1946)

John Arnold Niggeling (July 10, 1903 – September 16, 1963) was an American professional baseball pitcher who appeared in 184 games in Major League Baseball over all or parts of nine seasons (1938–1946) with the Boston Bees / Braves, Cincinnati Reds, St. Louis Browns and Washington Senators. He was a right-handed knuckleball specialist who was listed as 6 feet (1.8 m) tall and 170 pounds (77 kg).

Born in Remsen, Iowa, Niggeling entered pro baseball in 1928 and promptly won 51 games over his first three minor league seasons. But his major-league debut would have to wait until April 30, 1938, when he was 34 years old. He had two brief National League trials with the 1938 Bees and 1939 Reds, totaling 421/3 innings pitched, before he was acquired by the Browns in January 1940. In the American League over the next six seasons, Niggeling would exceed 150 innings pitched each year, win 56 games, and place in the Junior Circuit's top ten pitchers in earned run average three times (1942–1944), and strikeouts twice (1942 and 1944).

He won a career-high 15 games with the Browns in 1942 before joining the wartime Senators, who in both 1944 and 1945 fielded a starting rotation featuring four knuckleballers (Mickey Haefner, Dutch Leonard and Roger Wolff were the others). Niggeling's career won–lost record was 64–69 with a 3.22 ERA. In his 184 MLB games, 161 as a starting pitcher, he allowed 1,111 hits and 516 bases on balls, with 620 strikeouts, in 1,2502/3 innings of work; he was credited with 81 complete games and 12 shutouts. He retired from pro ball in 1947.

In later years, Niggeling worked as a barber in Le Mars, Iowa. At age 60, he died by suicide by hanging himself in his hotel room there. He had been suffering from back pain the last few years of his life and was recently divorced from his wife.

== See also ==
- List of knuckleball pitchers
