= Bert Shepard =

American baseball player (1920–2008)

- Pitcher
- Born: June 28, 1920; Dana, Indiana, U.S.
- Died: June 16, 2008 (aged 87); Highland, California, U.S.
- Batted: Left Threw: Left

MLB debut
- August 4, 1945, for the Washington Senators

Last MLB appearance
- August 4, 1945, for the Washington Senators

Career statistics
- Win–loss record: 0–0
- Earned run average: 1.69
- Strikeouts: 2
- Stats at Baseball Reference

Teams
- Washington Senators (1945)

Bert Robert Shepard (June 28, 1920 – June 16, 2008) was an American left-handed pitcher in Major League Baseball who pitched in one game for the Washington Senators in 1945 after having had his right leg amputated after his fighter plane was shot down in Germany during World War II while he was serving as a pilot in the Army Air Forces.

== Biography ==
Born in Dana, Indiana, the 5'11", 185 lb left-hander taught himself to walk and then to pitch with an artificial leg while confined in the German POW camp Stalag IX C(b) in city Meiningen. The Canadian doctor and prisoner Don Errey produced the prosthesis for Bert. Shepard had been gunned down east of Hamburg on his 34th mission as a P-38 fighter pilot; his life was saved by the doctor Lieutenant Ladislaus Loidl of the German Army.

On February 21, 1945, Shepard was back in the United States and hoping to resume his pitching career. Prior to the war, he had pitched for minor leagues all across the country, including the Anaheim Aces in 1941. During spring training in 1945, he impressed Senators owner Clark Griffith enough to be hired as a pitching coach. He pitched exhibition games and batting practice as well as one regulation game, making him the first man with an artificial leg to pitch in a major league baseball game.

On August 4, 1945, Shepard got the call to enter in the fourth inning of a home game in which the Senators were well behind the Boston Red Sox. It was game two of Washington's fourth consecutive doubleheader, with a fifth scheduled the next day as well. Shepard made headlines not only for being in the game itself, but also for his 5 1/3 innings of impressive relief, allowing only three hits and one run. He struck out the first batter he faced, Catfish Metkovich. The final score was Red Sox 15, Senators 4.

The game of August 4, 1945, was notable for two other events as well. Shepard came in to relieve teammate Joe Cleary, whose surrender of seven runs on five hits and three walks in one-third of an inning in his only big-league appearance earned him the highest lifetime ERA — 189.00 — of any pitcher in Major League Baseball history to have recorded at least one out. Also, outfielder Tom McBride tied a major league record with 6 runs batted in in the fourth inning, which was pitched by Cleary.

In between games of a doubleheader on August 31, Shepard received the Distinguished Flying Cross and the Air Medal for his service in World War II.

He later went on to be a player/manager in the minor leagues until 1954.

He was a key participant in the National Amps baseball teams of former servicemen with amputations secondary to war injuries. After retiring from baseball, Shepard worked for IBM and Hughes Aircraft as a safety engineer.

Shepard won the U.S. amputee golf championship in 1968 and 1971.

Shepard died at age 87 in Highland, California. He was buried at Riverside National Cemetery in Riverside, California.
