= José Zardón =

Cuban baseball player (1923-2017)

- Outfielder
- Born: May 20, 1923; Havana, Cuba
- Died: March 21, 2017 (aged 93); Tamarac, Florida, U.S.
- Batted: Right Threw: Right

MLB debut
- April 18, 1945, for the Washington Senators

Last MLB appearance
- September 16, 1945, for the Washington Senators

MLB statistics
- Batting average: .290
- Home runs: 0
- Runs batted in: 13
- Stats at Baseball Reference

Teams
- Washington Senators (1945)

José Antonio Zardón Sánchez (May 20, 1923 – March 21, 2017) was a Cuban professional baseball outfielder. Born in Havana, Cuba, he played one season in Major League Baseball for the Washington Senators in 1945. The 22-year-old rookie stood 6'0" and weighed 150 pounds.

Zardón is one of many ballplayers who only appeared in the major leagues during World War II. He made his major league debut on April 18, 1945, in a road game against the Philadelphia Athletics at Shibe Park. His season, and career, totals include 54 games played, a .290 batting average (38-for-131), 13 runs batted in, 13 runs scored, and a .374 slugging percentage. In his 43 outfield appearances he handled 106 of 109 chances successfully, and his .972 fielding percentage was just a shade below the league average.

Zardón was a member of the 1947 Havana Cubans, considered one of the top teams in minor league history. He died March 21, 2017, in Tamarac, Florida.
