= Dick Kimble =

American baseball player (1915–2001)

- Shortstop
- Born: July 27, 1915; Buchtel, Ohio, U.S.
- Died: May 7, 2001 (aged 85); Toledo, Ohio, U.S.
- Batted: Left Threw: Right

MLB debut
- August 20, 1945, for the Washington Senators

Last MLB appearance
- September 18, 1945, for the Washington Senators

MLB statistics
- Games played: 20
- Batting average: .245
- Runs batted in: 1
- Stats at Baseball Reference

Teams
- Washington Senators (1945)

Richard Lewis Kimble (July 27, 1915 – May 7, 2001) was an American shortstop in Major League Baseball. He played for the Washington Senators.
