= Dutch Leonard (right-handed pitcher) =

American baseball player (1909–1983)

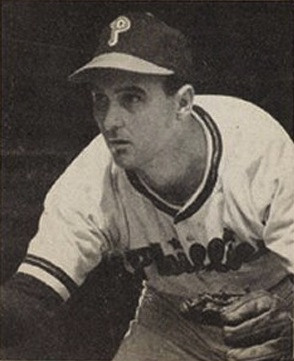
- Leonard with the Philadelphia Phillies in 1948
- Pitcher
- Born: March 25, 1909; Auburn, Illinois, U.S.
- Died: April 17, 1983 (aged 74); Springfield, Illinois, U.S.
- Batted: Right Threw: Right

MLB debut
- August 31, 1933, for the Brooklyn Dodgers

Last MLB appearance
- September 25, 1953, for the Chicago Cubs

MLB statistics
- Win–loss record: 191–181
- Earned run average: 3.25
- Strikeouts: 1,170
- Stats at Baseball Reference

Teams
- Brooklyn Dodgers (1933–1936); Washington Senators (1938–1946); Philadelphia Phillies (1947–1948); Chicago Cubs (1949–1953)

Career highlights and awards
- 5× All-Star (1940, 1943–1945, 1951)

Emil John "Dutch" Leonard (March 25, 1909 – April 17, 1983) was an American professional baseball player. He played in Major League Baseball (MLB) as a right-handed knuckleball pitcher for the Brooklyn Dodgers (1933–1936), Washington Senators (1938–1946), Philadelphia Phillies (1947–1948) and Chicago Cubs (1949–1953). Born in Auburn, Illinois, Leonard batted right-handed and was listed as 6 feet (1.8 m) tall and 175 pounds (79 kg).

== Playing career ==
In a 20-season career, Leonard posted a 191–181 won–lost record with 1,170 strikeouts and a 3.25 earned run average in 3,218 1/3 innings pitched. He was a six-time All-Star selection, and became the pitching coach of the Cubs immediately after his playing career ended (1954–1956).

On July 4, 1939, Leonard pitched a complete game and the Senators defeated the New York Yankees in the first game of a doubleheader at Yankee Stadium. At a ceremony between that game and the nightcap, Lou Gehrig, who had recently been diagnosed with ALS, delivered his famous "luckiest man on the face of the earth" speech.

During Washington's 1945 season, Leonard was part of what was possibly the only four-man rotation in baseball history to have been all knuckleball pitchers, joining Mickey Haefner, Johnny Niggeling and Roger Wolff. That year, Leonard put up a sparkling 17–7 won–lost mark (for a winning percentage of .708, third in the American League) and a 2.13 ERA (fourth in the AL—and one of seven seasons in which Leonard would place among his league's Top 10 in earned run average). The Senators contended for the American League pennant, but fell short of the Detroit Tigers by 11/2 games.

Reportedly, after facing Leonard, Jackie Robinson once said: "I am glad of one thing, and that is I don't have to hit against Dutch Leonard every day. Man, what a knuckleball that fellow has. It comes up, makes a face at you, then runs away." In the 2013 biographical movie about Robinson, 42, former MLB pitcher C. J. Nitkowski plays the role of Leonard pitching against Robinson.

== Personal life ==
Leonard died of congestive heart failure in Springfield, Illinois, on April 17, 1983, aged 74.

== See also ==
- List of knuckleball pitchers
- List of Major League Baseball annual saves leaders

Sporting positions
Preceded by Charlie Root	Chicago Cubs pitching coach 1954–1956	Succeeded by Freddie Fitzsimmons
