= Dick Stone (baseball) =

American baseball player (1911–1980)

- Relief pitcher
- Born: December 5, 1911; Oklahoma City, Oklahoma, U.S.
- Died: February 18, 1980 (aged 68); Oklahoma City, Oklahoma, U.S.
- Batted: Left Threw: Left

MLB debut
- August 25, 1945, for the Washington Senators

Last MLB appearance
- September 2, 1945, for the Washington Senators

MLB statistics
- Win–loss record: 0–0
- Earned run average: 0.00
- Strikeouts: 0
- Stats at Baseball Reference

Teams
- Washington Senators (1945)

Charles Richard Stone (December 5, 1911 – February 18, 1980) was an American professional baseball player who appeared in three games in 1945 for the Washington Senators. Prior to his short stint in the Major Leagues, Stone spent several seasons in the farm system of the Brooklyn Dodgers.

Stone died in his hometown of Oklahoma City, Oklahoma on February 18, 1980.
