= Knuckleball =

Baseball pitch

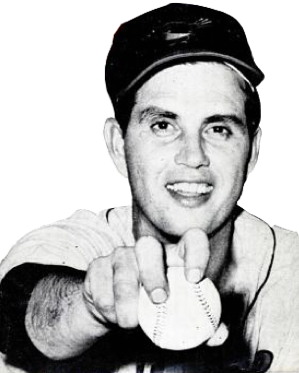
Hall of Fame knuckleballer Hoyt Wilhelm shows how he placed his fingers before a pitch.

A knuckleball or knuckler is a baseball pitch thrown to minimize the spin of the ball in flight, causing an erratic, unpredictable motion. While it is often incorrectly stated that the air flow over a seam of the ball causes the ball to change from laminar to turbulent flow, it has been recently shown that turbulence transition would cause the ball to move in the opposite direction as it does. Instead, the seam causes the boundary layer to detach, altering the pressure distribution and the force on the ball. At the same time, this detachment alters the shear stress on the ball, causing the seam positions to move. This makes it difficult for batters to hit but also difficult for pitchers to control and catchers to catch. Umpires are challenged as well, as the ball's irregular motion through the air makes it harder to call balls and strikes. A pitcher who throws knuckleballs is known as a knuckleballer.

== Origins ==
The origins of the knuckleball are unclear. Toad Ramsey of the Louisville Colonels in the American Association—whose pitch likely resembled the knuckle curve—and Eddie Cicotte of the Chicago White Sox, who in 1908 was nicknamed "Knuckles", are two possible creators of the pitch. Other accounts attribute the pitch's creation to Charles H. Druery, a pitcher in the Blue Ridge League. In 1917, Druery taught the pitch to Eddie Rommel, who became successful with it for the Philadelphia Athletics.

== Grip and motion ==
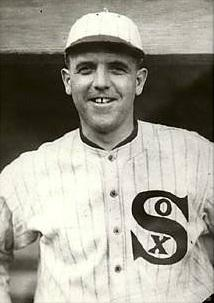
Eddie Cicotte, who is sometimes credited with inventing the knuckleball

As used by Cicotte, the knuckleball was originally thrown by holding the ball with the knuckles, hence the name of the pitch. Ed Summers, an Indianapolis teammate of Cicotte who adopted the pitch and helped develop it, modified it by holding the ball with his fingertips and using the thumb for balance, contrary to the misnomer that the ball is being held with the knuckles. This grip can also include digging the fingernails into the surface of the ball.

The fingertip grip is more commonly used by modern knuckleball pitchers, like the Boston Red Sox pitcher Tim Wakefield, who had a knuckleball with a lot of movement. There are other prominent knuckleball pitchers like Hall of Famer Phil Niekro, who had a very effective knuckler and knuckle curve, and Cy Young Award winning pitcher R. A. Dickey. However, young pitchers with smaller hands tend to throw the knuckleball with their knuckles. Sometimes young players will throw the knuckleball with their knuckles flat against the ball, giving it less spin but also making it difficult to throw any significant distance.

Regardless of how the ball is gripped, the purpose of the knuckleball is to have the least possible amount of rotational spin. When thrown that way, the ball's trajectory is significantly affected by variations in airflow caused by differences between the smooth surface of the ball and the stitching of its seams. The asymmetric drag that results tends to deflect the trajectory toward the side with the stitches. The variable sideways or vertical movement of the ball is actually caused by vortex generation. Vortices are spinning areas of air that are generated when a bluff object (ball) is moving with respect to a fluid (air). Vortices are also seen on flag poles to make the flag flutter and on paddles as whirlpools fall off the side of the paddle when it is dragged in the water. Because the ball is totally round, the place where the vortex passes over the side of the ball is random. A vortex is an area of low pressure so when the vortex is on a side of the ball, the ball moves in that direction. The next vortex will be on another side and cause the ball to move in that direction. As the ball approaches the batter, many vortices are generated and the ball darts in different directions thus making it almost impossible for the batter to predict where to swing the bat to make contact.

Over the distance from the pitcher's mound to home plate, the effect of these forces is that the knuckleball can flutter, dance, jiggle, or curve in two different directions during its flight. A pitch thrown entirely without spin is less desirable than one with a very slight spin. If the ball completes between one-quarter and one-half a rotation on its way from the pitcher to the batter; the position of the stitches changes as the ball travels, affecting the drag that gives the ball its motion, thus making its flight erratic. Even a ball thrown without rotation will "flutter", due to the "apparent wind" it feels as its trajectory changes throughout its flight path.

Hitting a knuckleball is different enough from other aspects of baseball that players specifically prepare for the pitch during batting practice before games they expect it in. According to physicist Robert Adair, due to the physiological limitation of human reaction time, a breaking knuckleball may be impossible to hit except by luck. If a knuckleball does not change direction in mid-flight, then it is easy to hit due to its lack of speed. A common phrase for hitting a knuckleball is "if it's low, let it go; if it's high, let it fly"; meaning that a batter should attempt to hit a knuckleball only if it crosses the plate high in the strike zone due to lack of break.

Since it typically only travels 60 to 70 miles per hour (97 to 113 km/h), far slower than the average major league fastball's 85 to 95 miles per hour (137 to 153 km/h), it can be hit very hard if there is no movement. One 2007 study offered evidence for this conclusion. To reduce the chances of having the knuckleball get hit for a home run, some pitchers will impart a slight topspin so that if no force causes the ball to dance, it will move downward in flight.

Another drawback is that runners on base can usually advance more easily than if a conventional pitcher is on the mound. This is due to both the knuckleball's low average speed and its erratic movement, which force the catcher to keep focusing on the ball even after the runners attempt to steal a base.

A paper presented at the 2012 Conference of the International Sports Engineering Association argues, based on PITCHf/x data, that knuckleballs do not make large and abrupt changes in their trajectories on the way to home plate—or at least, no more abrupt than a normal pitch. It speculates that the appearance of abrupt shifting may be due to the unpredictability of the changes in direction.

== Naming and relationship to other pitches ==
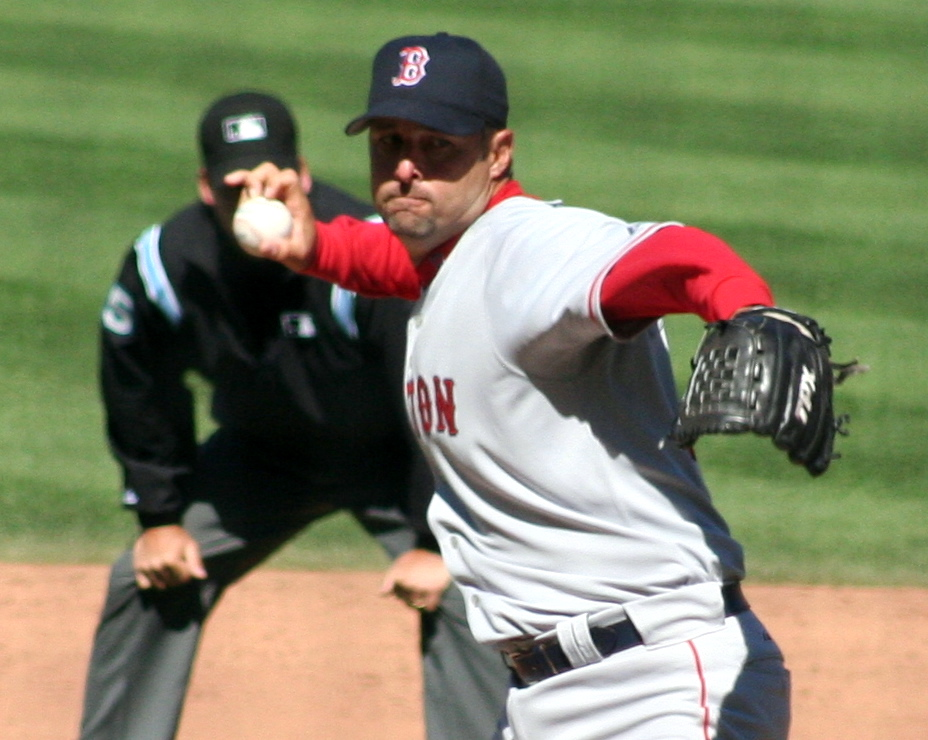
Tim Wakefield, a Boston Red Sox pitcher, in his throwing motion, showing his grip of the knuckleball

Since it developed during a period when the spitball was legal and commonly used, and was similarly surprising in its motion, the knuckleball was sometimes called the "dry spitter". Cicotte was widely reported to throw both the knuckleball and a variant on the spitball known as a "shine ball", because he would "shine" one side of a dirty ball by rubbing it on his uniform. Cicotte called the shine ball "a pure freak of the imagination", claiming that he did this to disconcert hitters and that the pitch was still a knuckleball.

Other names for the knuckleball have generally alluded to its motion and slower speed. These include the flutterball, the floater, the dancer, the butterfly ball (the name for the pitch used by French language game commentators employed by the Montreal Expos), the ghostball, and the bug.

The knuckle curve has a somewhat similar name because of the grip used to throw it, also with the knuckles or fingernails, but it is generally thrown harder and with spin. The resulting motion of the pitch more closely resembles a curveball, which explains the combination name. Toad Ramsey, a pitcher from 1885 to 1890, is credited in some later sources with being the first knuckleballer, apparently based primarily on accounts of how he gripped the ball. Based on more contemporary descriptions of his pitch as an "immense drop ball", it may be that his pitch was a form of knuckle curve.

Two later pitchers, Jesse Haines and Freddie Fitzsimmons, were sometimes characterized as knuckleball pitchers even by their contemporaries, but in their cases it again refers to a harder-thrown, curving pitch that would probably not be called a knuckleball today. Historically, the term "knuckle curve" had a usage that was different from what it has in the game today. Many current pitchers throw a curveball using a grip with the index finger touching the ball with the knuckle or fingertip, also called a spike curve. This modern pitch is unrelated to the knuckleball.

== Physics ==
The seams of a baseball have been shown to affect the separation of the boundary layer of air around a baseball, contributing to knuckleball movement. However, "knuckling" behavior has also been observed in perfectly-spherical and smooth steel beads.

== Rarity ==
As of 2004, only about 70 Major League Baseball pitchers have regularly used the knuckleball during their careers, and its use has become rarer over time. This can be attributed to a variety of factors. The first is selection bias in scouting. Because the speed of any prospect's pitch is one of the quickest and easiest metrics in judging the skill of the prospect, the knuckleball, which is thrown slower than any other pitch, gets overlooked. Tim Wakefield argued that "The problem is that [baseball] is so radar gun-oriented." Former knuckleballer and pitching coach Charlie Hough says that the increased rarity of the knuckleball is due to scouts increasingly looking only for the best arm. This effect is increasing over time as the modern game continues to emphasize power in pitching and average pitch speed increases.

Hoyt Wilhelm, Phil Niekro, and Jesse Haines, three pitchers who primarily relied on the knuckleball, have been inducted into the Baseball Hall of Fame. Ted Lyons, another member of the Hall of Fame, relied heavily on the knuckleball after injuring his arm in 1931. Niekro was given the nickname "Knucksie" during his career. Other prominent knuckleball pitchers have included Joe Niekro (Phil's brother), Charlie Hough, Dave Jolly, Ben Flowers, Wilbur Wood, Barney Schultz, Tom Candiotti, Bob Purkey, Steve Sparks, Eddie Rommel, Tim Wakefield, Steven Wright, and R. A. Dickey.

In the 1945 season, with talent depleted by call-ups to fight in World War II, the Washington Senators had a pitching rotation which included four knuckleball pitchers (Dutch Leonard, Johnny Niggeling, Mickey "Itsy Bitsy" Haefner, and Roger Wolff) who combined for 60 complete games and 60 wins, carrying the Senators to second place. Hall of Fame pitcher Bob Gibson said he threw a knuckleball in practice, and that one time in a game he used it to get Hank Aaron out.

In November 2008, 16-year-old knuckleballer Eri Yoshida was drafted as the first woman ever to play in Japanese professional baseball for the Kobe 9 Cruise of the Kansai Independent Baseball League. In March 2010, she trained with Tim Wakefield at the Boston Red Sox minor-league training facility. In April 2010, she signed with the Chico Outlaws, debuting in May 2010.

Another factor contributing to the rarity of the knuckleball is the difficulty of throwing it. R. A. Dickey estimates that it takes at least a year to grasp its fundamentals. The knuckleball is radically different from any other pitch in a pitcher's arsenal, being less predictable and difficult to control. It is for this reason that the knuckleball is widely regarded as unreliable, and knuckleball pitchers are prone to extended slumps, such as when Tim Wakefield was released from the Pirates in a mid-career slump during spring training in 1995.

Another reason for the difficulty of the knuckleball is due to the network effect. Because there are so few knuckleball pitchers, the resources for learning and improving the knuckleball are few compared to more common pitches. Pitching coaches often struggle with knuckleball pitchers due to a lack of experience with the pitch. "I think the hardest thing for me is just the alone-ness that you feel sometimes because nobody else really does it," said Wakefield.

Coaches have also been seen as a barrier to succeeding with the knuckleball. Jim Bouton said, "coaches don't respect it. You can pitch seven good innings with a knuckleball, and as soon as you walk a guy they go, 'See, there's that damn knuckleball.'" R. A. Dickey argues that, "for most managers, it takes a special manager to be able to really trust it—the bad and the good of it. Coaches are quick to banish the pitch after one bad outing. This was common due to the amount of practice one must put into the pitch. And traditionally, if you look at Tim Wakefield, Joe and Phil Niekro, Tom Candiotti, Wilbur Wood, Hoyt Wilhelm and all the guys that threw it, through their success they had guys who really believed in what it could do long-term and committed to giving them the ball every fifth day to do it."

In 1991, Hall of Fame catcher Rick Ferrell was quoted as saying, "I think the knuckleball is fading out." Ferrell knew knuckleballs: he had the task of being the Washington Senators catcher in 1944–45, when the Senators had four knuckleball pitchers in their starting rotation. Furthermore, other factors, such as a dearth of knuckleball teachers and the dramatic increase in the running game—base stealing is often easier against knuckleball pitchers—may be contributing to its demise.

Perhaps as a result, knuckleball pitchers often view themselves as members of an exclusive club, with its own uniform number (49, first worn by Wilhelm) and leader, Phil Niekro, whom The New Yorker in 2004 called "the undisputed Grand Poobah" of the group after Wilhelm's death. Because they cannot discuss pitching with non knuckleball-using teammates, they often share tips and insights even if on competing teams, and believe that they have a responsibility to help younger players develop the pitch. In 2012, when R. A. Dickey became the first Cy Young Award-winning knuckleball pitcher, he called the award "a victory for … the knuckleball fraternity", and of the dozens of phone calls he received after the announcement, Niekro's was the only one he answered.

When originally developed, the knuckleball was used by a number of pitchers as simply one pitch in their repertoire, usually as part of changing speeds from their fastball. It is almost never used in a mixed repertoire today, and some believe that to throw the knuckleball effectively with some semblance of control over the pitch, one must throw it more or less exclusively. At the same time, pitchers rarely focus on the knuckleball if they have reasonable skill with more standard pitches. Unlike conventional pitches, which perform fast results without much exertion, a knuckleball pitcher must train his body and muscle memory to be able to execute a 65 mph pitch with less than one rotation.

On June 24, 2023, the San Diego Padres called up Matt Waldron to start against the Washington Nationals. This makes him the most recent and only active knuckleballer in Major League Baseball. Prior to Waldron, Steven Wright of the Boston Red Sox was considered to be the last active knuckleballer in the MLB; he has since been released from the team. Mickey Jannis, prior player of the Baltimore Orioles organization, also throws the knuckleball, and made his major league debut on June 23, 2021.

Among position players making pitching appearances, those who have utilized the knuckleball include Wade Boggs, Danny Worth, Alex Blandino, and Ernie Clement.

On October 1, 2023, pitcher George Kirby of the Seattle Mariners threw his first knuckleball in an MLB game, drawing a swing and miss from the Texas Rangers' Corey Seager. After the game, Kirby confirmed that he chose this day to debut the pitch as a tribute to Boston Red Sox knuckleballer and World Series champion Tim Wakefield, who had died that morning.

== Use in pitching ==
The knuckleball does provide some advantages to its practitioners. It does not need to be thrown hard (in fact, throwing too hard may diminish its effectiveness), and is therefore less taxing on the arm. Knuckleball pitchers can throw more innings than other pitchers, and, requiring less time to recover after pitching, can pitch more frequently. The lower physical strain also fosters longer careers. Some knuckleballers have continued to pitch professionally well into their forties: Tim Wakefield, Hoyt Wilhelm, R. A. Dickey, Charlie Hough, Tom Candiotti, and the brothers Phil Niekro and Joe Niekro.

Pitchers like Jim Bouton have found success as knuckleballers after their ability to throw hard declined. Bouton's famous best-selling book Ball Four (1970), while scandalous at the time for its unvarnished and often uncomplimentary portrayal of player behavior and coaching small-mindedness, is primarily about trying to stay in the major leagues as a knuckleball pitcher.

== Catching ==
The way to catch a knuckleball is to wait until it stops rolling and pick it up.

— Bob Uecker

As with hitters, the unpredictable motion of the knuckleball makes it one of the most difficult pitches for catchers to handle, and they tend to be charged with a significantly higher number of passed balls. Former catcher Bob Uecker, who caught for Phil Niekro, said, "The way to catch a knuckleball is to wait until it stops rolling and pick it up." Bouton said, "Catchers hate it. Nobody likes to warm up with you." According to Adair, the 150 ms minimum human reaction time may be too slow to adjust to a knuckleball's changing direction.

A team will sometimes employ a catcher solely for games started by a knuckleballer. The "knuckleball catcher" is equipped with an oversized knuckleball catcher's mitt, similar to a first baseman's glove; Doug Mirabelli, formerly of the Red Sox, used a softball catcher's mitt. The Boston Red Sox, in their 2004 world championship season, had Mirabelli regularly catching in place of Jason Varitek when Tim Wakefield was pitching. This use of a "specialist" catcher continued into the 2008 season following the signing of Kevin Cash, and 2009 saw George Kottaras fulfill this role. On August 26, the first time Victor Martinez caught Wakefield, he used a first baseman's glove, instead of a regular catcher's mitt. For a catcher, a key disadvantage to using a first baseman's glove mitt is that they are not designed for easy extraction of the ball from the glove, making it harder to prevent baserunners from stealing.

On occasion, teams have traded knuckleball pitchers and their catchers in the same transaction. In baseball terminology the pitcher and catcher together are known as a "battery", and having a catcher experienced in catching a knuckleball pitcher is preferable, so the trade of pitcher and catcher together is sometimes referred to as a "batteries included" trade. For example, Josh Thole and Mike Nickeas went with Dickey when the pitcher was traded to the Toronto Blue Jays in late 2012, and the team later signed Henry Blanco, who also caught for Dickey.

The record for passed balls in an inning (4) was first set by Ray Katt of the New York Giants in 1954, catching Hoyt Wilhelm. It was tied by Geno Petralli of the Texas Rangers in 1987 while trying to catch knuckleball pitcher Charlie Hough, and tied again in 2013 when Ryan Lavarnway of the Boston Red Sox had four in the first inning, catching knuckleballer Steven Wright in Wright's first major league start.

Varitek holds the postseason record with three passed balls in the 13th inning of Game 5 of the 2004 American League Championship Series while catching Wakefield.

In 2013, J. P. Arencibia set a Toronto Blue Jays franchise record by allowing four passed balls in the season opener (a 4–2 loss) while catching for knuckleballer R. A. Dickey. He never caught for Dickey again.

== Use in other sports ==
=== Cricket ===
The knuckleball is employed by cricket fast bowlers Zaheer Khan, Bhuvneshwar Kumar and Andrew Tye as their slower delivery. The physics of the operation are largely the same. The seam on a cricket ball is equatorial, and the extent of erratic movement is reduced due to the symmetry, at least in the conventional release position where the planes of the ball's trajectory and the seam are nearly co-planar. The lack of backspin shortens the length of the delivery, and tends to make the ball skid off the pitch—faster than it would come off a normal delivery.

=== Volleyball ===
In volleyball, the float serve involves hitting the volleyball in such a way to minimize the rotation of the ball, causing unpredictability in the ball's movement. When done correctly, the float serve is hard for opponents to predict where the ball will end up, rendering it hard to pass.

=== Association football ===
In association football (soccer), the method of striking the ball so that it produces almost no spinning motion during its flight has been colloquially described as "knuckleballing" by commentators in the USA, due to the ball's motion that resembles a baseball thrown with a knuckleball pitch. This shooting technique is frequently used by players for long-range shots and free kicks. A successful knuckleball shot will move, dip, or wobble in the air unpredictably, making it difficult for the goalkeeper to save. This technique has also been described as the "dry leaf" or "dead leaf" (folha seca in Portuguese), the "tomahawk", or even "the accursed" (maledetta in Italian).

One of the main proponents of this shooting technique was Brazilian playmaker Juninho Pernambucano, who popularised it in particular during his time with Lyon in the mid 2000s. It is commonly thought to have been invented by compatriot Didi, although Italian forward Giuseppe Meazza before him is also credited with using the technique. This technique has been used and even adapted by several other players, such as Andrea Pirlo, Ronaldinho, Cristiano Ronaldo, Didier Drogba, Marcus Rashford, Gareth Bale, and Barbara Bonansea.

=== American football ===
In American football, a knuckleball is occasionally employed by punters. Chris Gardocki achieved a knuckleball effect by punting towards the left sideline with his left foot, leading to unpredictable results. Sam Koch developed the technique further, kicking the football at an angle to reduce spin. Koch would often aim his knucklers towards the middle of the field in an attempt to bait the returner into trying to catch the ball. Because of the unpredictable nature of a knuckler, this could lead the returner to muff the punt and cause a turnover. A knuckleball may also be used to describe a kick by a kicker, either field goals or extra points, if the ball is not hit well. Starting in 2025 kickers such as Ryan Fitzgerald started using a knuckball after a rule change on kickoffs.

== See also ==
- List of knuckleball pitchers
- Knuckleball!, 2012 documentary
