= Hal Newhouser =

American baseball player (1921–1998)

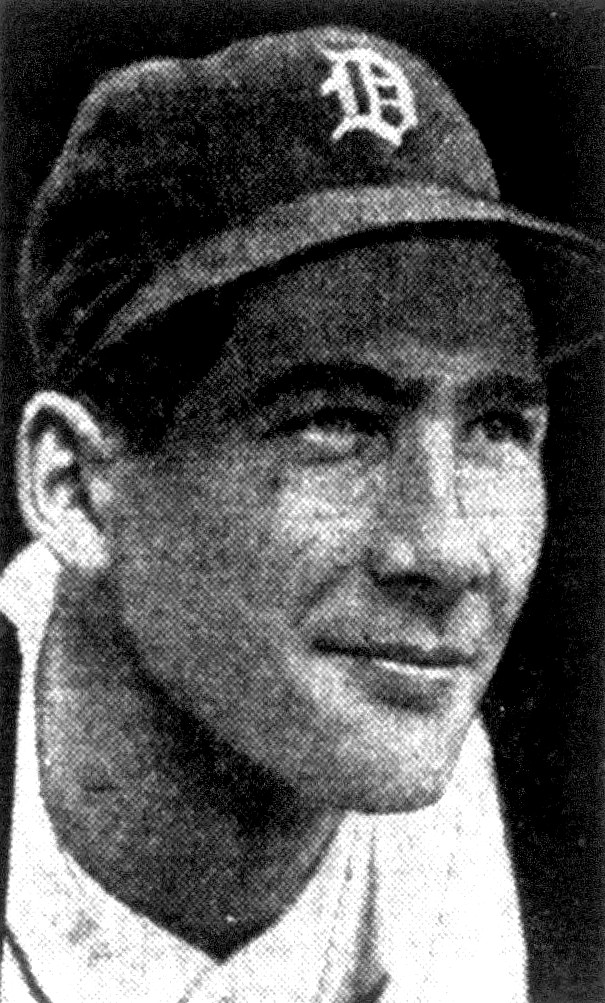
- Newhouser in 1953
- Pitcher
- Born: May 20, 1921; Detroit, Michigan, U.S.
- Died: November 10, 1998 (aged 77); Southfield, Michigan, U.S.
- Batted: Left Threw: Left

MLB debut
- September 29, 1939, for the Detroit Tigers

Last MLB appearance
- May 3, 1955, for the Cleveland Indians

MLB statistics
- Win–loss record: 207–150
- Earned run average: 3.06
- Strikeouts: 1,796
- Stats at Baseball Reference

Teams
- Detroit Tigers (1939–1953); Cleveland Indians (1954–1955)

Career highlights and awards
- 7× All-Star (1942–1948); World Series champion (1945); 2× AL MVP (1944, 1945); Triple Crown (1945); 4× AL wins leader (1944–1946, 1948); 2× MLB ERA leader (1945, 1946); 2× MLB strikeout leader (1944, 1945); Detroit Tigers No. 16 retired

Member of the National

Baseball Hall of Fame
- Induction: 1992
- Election method: Veterans Committee

Harold Newhouser (May 20, 1921 – November 10, 1998), nicknamed "Prince Hal" and "Hurricane Hal," was an American professional baseball player. He played in Major League Baseball as a pitcher from 1939 to 1955, most notably for the Detroit Tigers, where he was selected for seven straight All-Star Games from 1942 to 1948. He became the first pitcher to win the Most Valuable Player Award twice in consecutive years, winning in 1944 and 1945. Newhouser was inducted into the National Baseball Hall of Fame and Museum in 1992 and his number 16 was retired by the Tigers in 1997.

Newhouser was highly regarded by Tigers scout Wish Egan, who ended up signing the Detroit native to his hometown club for the 1939 season. Starting in the minor leagues that year, the 18 year-old was called up to the major league squad late in the season and made his first start on September 26, 1939. His initial years were rocky, failing to eclipse nine wins in a season from 1939 to 1943. His breakout year came in 1944, in which the 23 year-old totaled 29 wins, the highest mark for a pitcher since 1931, en route to an MVP award. He continued his stellar play in the 1945 season, in which he won the Pitching Triple Crown, another MVP Award, and was the winning pitcher of Game 7 of that year's World Series against the Chicago Cubs.

Newhouser continued to be a consistently solid pitcher in the post-war years, with no pitcher winning more games in the 1940s than his 170. By 1950, problems with his throwing shoulder significantly decreased his effectiveness. He was released from the Tigers during the 1953 season and was headed for retirement until his former teammate, Hank Greenberg, then general manager of the Cleveland Indians, signed him as a relief pitcher during the 1954 season. Newhouser went 7-2 in 26 appearances with a 2.51 ERA for the 111-win (in a 154 game season) American League pennant-winning Indians, then retired at 34 the following year after pitching in just two games.

Newhouser then served as a scout for the Baltimore Orioles, with some of his notable player findings including Milt Pappas and Dean Chance. He then worked at a bank for twenty years before returning to scouting for the Houston Astros. He insisted that the Astros should draft future Hall of Fame shortstop Derek Jeter out of high school. When the Astros opted for Phil Nevin instead, he retired from baseball.

== Early life ==
Harold "Hal" Newhouser was born on May 20, 1921, in Detroit, Michigan. He was the second son of Theodore and Emilie Newhouser. His father, a former gymnast from Czechoslovakia, worked as a drafter in the automobile industryl; his mother was from Austria. Prior to Hal's birth, the Newhousers lived in Pittsburgh. His parents were largely indifferent about baseball, even after Hal's brother Dick, elder by four years, was signed by Detroit Tigers scout Wish Egan and spent a couple years with the team's minor league affiliates. During the Great Depression, Newhouser sold newspapers, set up pins at a bowling alley, and collected bottles for their refunds to save up money to attend trade school.

As a teenager, Newhouser played in a fast-pitch softball league, but upon the Tigers' win in the 1935 World Series the fourteen year-old decided he wanted to pitch for them. The next year he started pitching in a sandlot ball league. Over three seasons he earned 42 wins against 3 losses. He played on the Wilbur Wright Vocational High School baseball team. Egan, who took notice of Hal's athletic ability while scouting Dick, convinced him to drop that team and play American Legion Baseball instead. Newhouser did well against the improved competition in Legion play. He recorded nineteen consecutive wins in one stretch, including striking out 20 or more hitters in a game five times.

"I knew when I was fifteen I was going to play in the big leagues. No doubt in my mind."

— Newhouser, November 1984

While in high school Newhouser trained as a machinist. Though a talented machinist, he found it too risky, especially after having to drive numerous injured classmates to the hospital. Instead, Newhouser studied to become a drafter, like his father at Chrysler. While pitching in the minor leagues, Newhouser would study for his exams, which he would take in September of 1939 when the major league Tigers called him up at just 18. When he was invited to spring training for the team in 1940, he fell behind in his studies. Even though he had become a major leaguer for good, he was still held back from graduating with his class that June. Returning to school that September, he would spend three hours each morning there before reporting to Briggs Stadium, including prior to 1940 World Series games. He graduated in January 1941.

== Professional career ==
=== Detroit Tigers (1939–1953) ===
==== 1939–1943 ====
Newhouser's talent had been noticed by teams across the MLB, most notably the Tigers and the Cleveland Indians. Soon after returning from a Legion ball tournament on the evening of August 6, 1938, Newhouser signed with the Tigers at the age of 17, thanks to Egan's early scouting efforts and the relationship they had formed. Egan was able to convince Newhouser to sign for the team with a $500 signing bonus. Upon signing, Newhouser, whom Egan deemed the "greatest left-handed pitcher [he] ever saw," gave $400 to his parents while saving the other $100 for himself. Ten minutes later, Indians scout Cy Slapnicka arrived at the Newhouser house with a $15,000 check and a new car, offering both for Newhouser to sign with the franchise. Crushed, Newhouser told Slapnicka that he had already signed with Detroit.

Newhouser started his career in 1939 with the Tigers' Class D affiliate, the Alexandria Aces of the Evangeline Baseball League. He won his first professional baseball game there, striking out eighteen batters in the effort, before winning seven more and earning a promotion to the Class A Beaumont Exporters of the Texas League. Newhouser started hot in Beaumont, winning his first four games before falling into a slump, losing thirteen straight during one particularly bad stretch. This string of performances, along with his notably poor temper, alarmed the Tigers front office. Egan, however, convinced them to call up Newhouser near the end of the season, in order to keep a better eye on him. He joined a pitching staff with the likes of veteran players Schoolboy Rowe, Tommy Bridges, and Bobo Newsom, along with younger players Dizzy Trout and Fred Hutchinson. Manager Del Baker wanted to include the young prospects in the rotation in the final games of the season and on September 26, 1939, Newhouser made his major league debut in the second game of a doubleheader against the Indians. In the game, Newhouser gave up three hits and four walks in five innings, when the game was called due to darkness. Newhouser was credited with the 0–3 loss.

The 1940 campaign saw Newhouser become a much more active part of the rotation. He started in 20 games and posted a 9–9 record with a 4.86 earned run average (ERA). On May 2, Newhouser recorded his first ever win when he allowed only six hits in a 5–3 victory against the Washington Senators away. Detroit went on to win the American League pennant, finishing one game over Cleveland and two over the New York Yankees, earning a 1940 World Series appearance against the Cincinnati Reds. Newhouser, the youngest player on the Tigers roster, did not make an appearance in the Series. He instead watched from the dugout as the Reds won in seven games. Newhouser continued to be an active part of the Tigers rotation in 1941, this time posting a 9–11 record with a 4.79 ERA.

During the 1942 season, Newhouser succeeded against the reduced offensive talent in the league as a result of many players serving in the armed forces during World War II. He finished the season with a 2.45 ERA with eleven complete games and five saves and was an All-Star Game selection for the first time in his career. Despite the positive pitching performance, Newhouser had inconsistent run support from his offensive counterparts and finished the season 8–14. In June, Newhouser planned on being sworn into the Army Air Corps during a game in order to serve in World War II. However, due to a congenital heart defect, he was deemed unfit for service following his physical examination in July.

The 1943 season saw a couple of changes in the Tigers lineup. Firstly, former catcher Steve O'Neill became the new manager of Detroit. Replacing him at the catcher spot would be Paul Richards, who last played for the Philadelphia Athletics in 1935. Richards was largely tasked with bringing Newhouser and his young compatriots to their full potential. At the start of the season, he had proven successful in doing this, as Newhouser credited Richards for his hot start. His 14 strikeouts on May 27 against the New York Yankees were the most a pitcher had put up in a single game since Bob Feller threw 18 in 1938. Through the beginning of June with 50 innings pitched, his earned run average was 0.90, 0.19 lower than Dutch Leonard's full season record. Once again, Newhouser was selected for an All-Star Game, recording a strikeout in three innings of work in the Midsummer Classic. Despite the initial success, Newhouser lost nine straight games from late July to September and finished the season with a dismal 8–17 record and a league-leading 111 walks. Following a September in which he posted a 5.19 ERA, he likely would have been let go had the wartime league talent not been so thin.

==== 1944–1947 ====
During the offseason prior to the 1944 season, Newhouser was offered a full-time job at Chrysler. His family implored him to take the position, as they viewed it as much more secure than a career in baseball, especially with his dismal 34–52 record in his first four years. Newhouser, however, decided to take one more chance at baseball. At that year's wartime spring training in Evansville, Indiana, Richards told the 23 year-old Newhouser: "You've been a thrower. I'm going to make you a pitcher." Originally possessing just a fastball, curveball, and changeup, Richards taught Newhouser how to throw a slider. He also taught Newhouser to control his emotions, although it remains unknown exactly what teaching method he used.

The training worked, as 1944 proved to be Newhouser's breakout year. He posted a 29–9 record with a 2.22 ERA en route to his first Most Valuable Player Award. His season started shaky, as he gave up five runs in just two innings of work during his first start, causing manager Steve O'Neill to send him to the bullpen for a week. On April 27 against the Chicago White Sox, Newhouser was given the start, in what O'Neill told him was his "last chance" to remain in the starting rotation. Newhouser made good of his chance, pitching a twelve-inning complete game shutout. This success continued and he was selected to his third-straight All-Star team, giving up two runs in one and two-thirds innings of work in the 1944 Game.

The late season pennant race of 1944 was incredibly competitive, with the Tigers, Yankees (whom Newhouser recorded six wins against across the season), and the St. Louis Browns all in contention within the final week. After the Yankees lost a late-season series to the Browns, they were eliminated from contention. With just two days to go, Detroit and St. Louis were tied at the top of the standings. Newhouser pitched win number 29 against the Washington Senators the following day, but the Browns also won their game, meaning the result of the next game would decide who would win the pennant. Detroit lost their final regular season game to the Senators, while St. Louis defeated the Yankees in a comeback to secure the pennant.

With the Cy Young Award for baseball's top pitcher still a dozen years away, the MVP award was the sport's highest recognition for any player. Voting between Newhouser and fellow Tiger starter Dizzy Trout was extremely tight. In fact, Trout won ten first-place votes compared to Newhouser's seven. However, Newhouser's 236 votes were four more than Trout's 232 and he took the title, largely due to his league-leading 187 strikeouts. Years later, Newhouser expressed disappointment that he was unable to reach the 30-win mark, which at the time was last achieved in the American League by Lefty Grove in 1931. He attributed falling short to two factors: his last regular season start ending in a 1–1 tie because of bad weather, and the Tigers needing to win the final game of the season to have a chance to clinch the pennant – at the time the only route to the postseason, a single 7-game clash between the American and National league champions. Rather than send Newhouser out on zero days rest after a complete game win, manager O'Neill decided to start Trout.

In reality, instead of being stymied by any 1-1 tie in his final start, Newhouser won his last 7-3, going all 9 innings against the Senators on September 30; the 1-1 tie was back on the 26th of July, vs the Boston Red Sox. Trout pitched a 9-inning complete game against the Senators the very next day after Newhouser's win, but fell 4-1, yielding the AL flag to the Browns by 1 game.

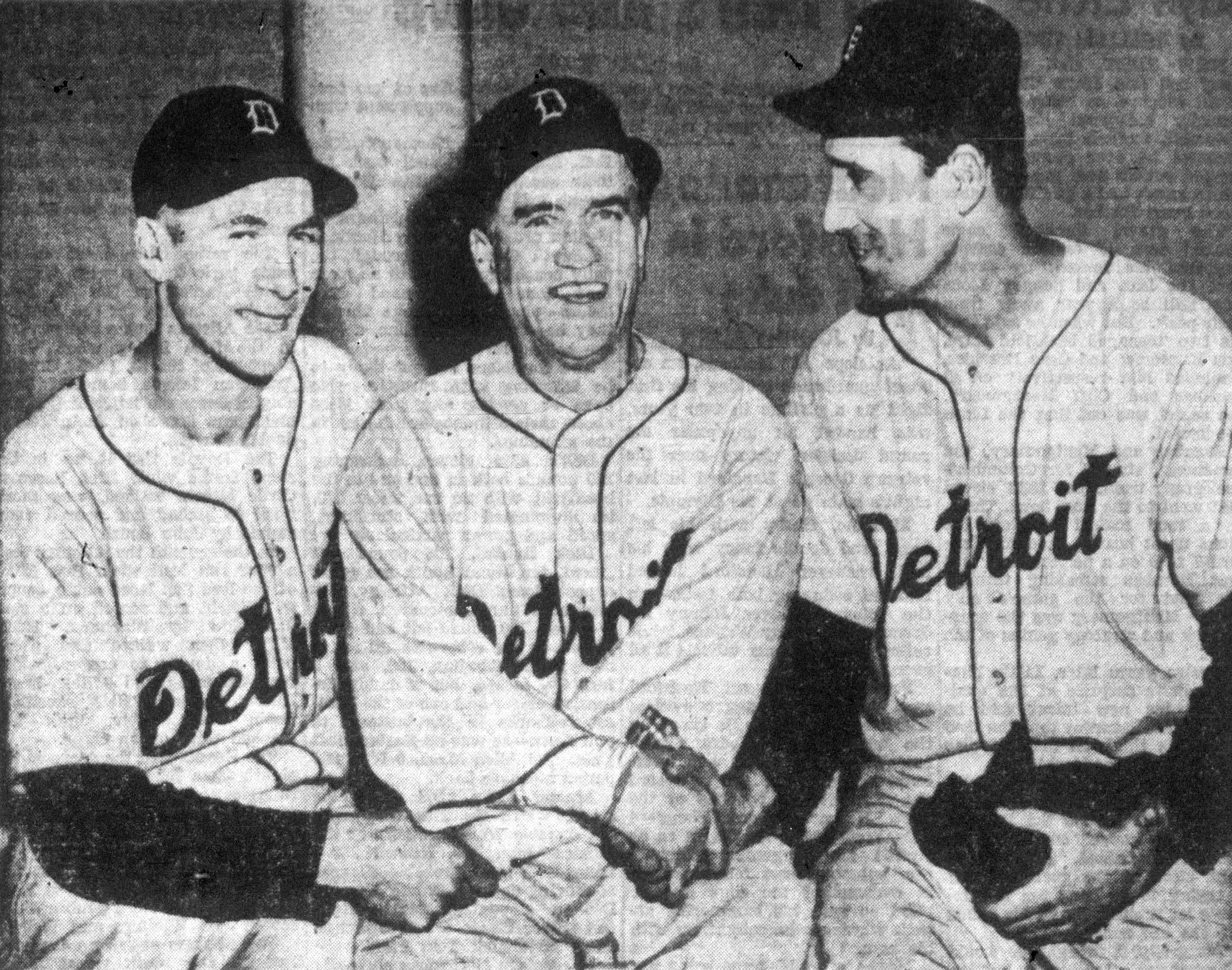
Newhouser (left) with manager Steve O'Neill and teammate Hank Greenberg during the 1945 season

Newhouser followed up his sterling 1944 season with a league-leading 25 wins and a 1.81 ERA, with only 9 losses in his 1945 campaign. He also led the league with 313 innings pitched, 29 complete games, 212 strikeouts, and 8 shutouts, en route to the Pitching Triple Crown and his second consecutive MVP award. This made him the first ever pitcher to win the MVP award back-to-back. Although no All-Star Game was held in 1945 due to wartime travel restrictions, Newhouser made the hypothetical list of All-Stars compiled by the Associated Press.

Late in the season, Newhouser was suffering from back spasms and was allowed to stay in Detroit while the team traveled east. During a series against the Yankees, however, he was asked to travel to New York and pitch by manager Jack Zeller, as the Tigers pitching staff was exhausted. Despite being unable to throw his curveball due to severe pain, Newhouser leaned on his fastball and changeup to shutout the Yankees. His back continued to cause problems for him, however, as he was only able to pitch the first inning of a doubleheader against the Senators, who were just a half-game behind Detroit, before being relieved. The Senators finished the season with 87 wins, a game behind the Tigers, who were held back from a chance at clinching the pennant by four consecutive games. When the rain finally let up, the Tigers played their final regular season game against the St. Louis Browns. Virgil Trucks, who had been medically discharged from the Navy at Norman, Oklahoma for a knee problem just five days prior, started the game. After 5 1/3 innings, Trucks was relieved by Newhouser, who inherited the bases loaded with only one out and a 2–1 lead. Newhouser escaped the inning without allowing a run, but gave up runs in both the seventh and eighth innings to allow the Browns a 3-2 lead. In the top of the ninth, however, future Hall of Fame slugger Hank Greenberg hit a grand slam to give the Tigers a 6–3 lead, which would hold, giving Newhouser the pitching win and clinching the pennant for Detroit.

Detroit faced off against the Chicago Cubs in the 1945 World Series. Newhouser pitched the opening game, giving up seven runs before being pulled in the third inning as the Cubs routed Detroit, 9–0. Tied up at two games apiece, Newhouser was given the nod to pitch game five, improving upon his initial start by tossing a complete game in which the Tigers won 8–4. Three days later, Newhouser was chosen to pitch game seven. The Tigers offense gave him a five-run cushion in the first inning, but Newhouser only allowed three runs in nine innings, striking out ten in a 9–3 Tigers win, claiming the world title.

In the offseason prior to the 1946 season, Mexican League president Jorge Pasquel offered Newhouser, the biggest name in baseball at the time, $200,000 to pitch three seasons in Mexico, with a $300,000 signing bonus. While tempting, Newhouser feared being banned from baseball if the Mexican League didn't survive. Newhouser instead accepted a $10,000 signing bonus to stay with the Tigers and a promise that he would be given a raise when his new contract was due. However, before signing, trade rumors between the Yankees and the Tigers involved a deal between Newhouser and Joe DiMaggio. It was further rumored that Boston Red Sox slugger Ted Williams could also have been dealt for Newhouser and Dick Wakefield. Ultimately, no such trade ever occurred and Newhouser remained a Tiger. While the league was dominated in 1946 by the Boston Red Sox, led by returning star Ted Williams, Newhouser had an exceptional season, rivaling future Hall of Fame Cleveland Indians ace Bob Feller for the AL's top pitcher and one of baseball's best. He was selected to the 1946 All-Star Game and pitched four strikeouts in three innings of work. In total, he tossed a league-best 26 wins with a league-leading 1.94 ERA. While Williams won the MVP award, Newhouser finished close behind him to claim second place in the voting.

The 1947 season for the Tigers was largely characterized by good pitching play, but a lack of offense following the departure of 1946 AL home run and RBI champion Hank Greenberg. Without solid run support, Newhouser posted a 17–17 record with a 2.87 ERA and 176 strikeouts, although he was selected the starter for the 1947 All-Star Game, where didn't allow a run in three innings of work. On August 28, during a game with the Red Sox, Newhouser was fined $250 by manager Steve O'Neill for a lack of effort after giving up five runs in the third inning, as well as for refusing to leave the mound after being summoned to the dugout. Newhouser claimed that he never talked back to O'Neill and felt confident that he could deliver a quality performance, insisting that he was trying. In response, O'Neill said that "it didn't look like it to me. He certainly was playing inferior ball." It was both O'Neill's first fine given as a manager and Newhouser's first received as a player. Towards the end of the campaign, Newhouser watched film of his pitching motion, comparing his 1947 delivery to that of his big mid-1940s years. After correcting a flaw in his follow-through he won three of his last four decisions.

==== 1948–1953 ====
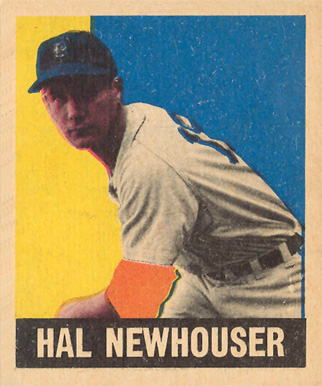
1948 baseball card depicting Newhouser

Newhouser improved from the 1947 campaign in his 1948 season, posting a league-leading 21 wins with 143 strikeouts and earning a selection to the 1948 All-Star Game. The start of the season proved challenging for Newhouser. He won the Tigers' Opening Day matchup against the Chicago White Sox, before losing four straight starts. Starting with a 4–1 victory against the Boston Red Sox on May 19, Newhouser won seven straight games until his streak was busted in another start against the Red Sox on June 20. On August 8, he became the American League's first 15-game winner when he was credited for the win against the Washington Senators and on September 29, following a 4–0 win against the Browns, Newhouser recorded his fourth twenty-win season of his career. Newhouser pitched in the final game of the season against the Indians in front of a crowd of over 74,000 at Cleveland Municipal Stadium. On short rest and battling an arm injury, he tossed a 7–1 victory over longtime foe Bob Feller, in what Newhouser considered to be one of the best games of his life. Despite the success, the wear on Newhouser's arm was showing and his fastball began to slow.

He was given the start on Opening Day on April 13, 1949, against the White Sox. Pitching in front of an Opening Day-record 53,435 fans at Briggs Stadium, Newhouser tossed a complete game, allowing three hits and only one run in the 5–1 win, his fourth straight on Opening Day. On September 8, in the first game of a doubleheader against the Indians, Newhouser started the game by retiring the first 17 Cleveland batters in order before allowing a walk to Frank Papish. An inning later, he gave up his only hit, a single to Lou Boudreau, ending the no-hit bid. Newhouser completed the 10–0 shutout, only his second one-hit performance of his career. On September 24, also against the Indians, Newhouser tossed his eighteenth and final win of the season.

Newhouser's 1950 season was delayed due to a sore shoulder. Due to the ailment, he was only able to record four innings during spring training and missed the entire month of April and about half of May. Newhouser made his season debut on May 14, in a game against the St. Louis Browns. He only lasted three innings in that game, giving up five runs. His second start on May 22 against the Washington Senators was much better, taking a shutout into the ninth inning before allowing a run in the 5–1 Tigers victory. He recorded 15 wins in 1950.

During spring training for 1951, Newhouser told an interviewer that "this will be my best season, or my last." His best season it was not, as he recorded six wins and six losses with a 3.92 ERA. His final appearance came on July 14 against the Senators, when he failed to last two innings in the loss. Pain in his arm became overbearing and he was placed on the disabled list in August, with minor leaguer Wayne McLeland called up to fill his spot.

Despite his promise in spring training, Newhouser returned to the Tigers for the 1952 season. Prior to 1952, Newhouser suggested a five-year deal worth $100,000, for insurance in case he could not pitch all five years and became a coach instead. While the Tigers had a policy against multiyear contracts, they considered the offer before ultimately turning him down. Newhouser ultimately missed workouts in spring training due to his contract holdout. At one point, he requested a clause that he would not be traded, a condition general manager Charlie Gehringer couldn't guarantee. In 19 starts that season, Newhouser posted a 9–9 record and a 3.74 ERA. Towards the end of the year, he lost his starting spot to Billy Hoeft. His ninth victory of the season was his 200th career win.

On February 21, 1953, the day before spring training, Newhouser re-signed with the Tigers prior to to 1953 season, being the last Tiger to re-sign. He only appeared in seven games, finishing 0–1 with a 7.06 ERA. The Tigers released Newhouser unconditionally on July 22, 1953. When interviewed, he said that "this is the end. I'm finished as an active player. My arm just can't stand the strain anymore."

=== Cleveland Indians (1954–1955) ===
After his release, Newhouser assumed he would retire, though he spent the winter months training his arm in Bradenton, Florida, On February 15, 1954, former teammate Hank Greenberg, then general manager of the Cleveland Indians, extended an opportunity to work out with the team in Tucson, Arizona, which Newhouser accepted. He made four appearances in the spring, giving up six runs in his first appearance. In his three subsequent appearances, he only allowed one run in 13 innings. On April 11, he signed with the Indians. During the 1954 season, he primarily served as a long reliever and finished with seven wins and seven saves with a 2.51 ERA. His Indians team posted a record 111 wins that season, leading to a World Series appearance against the New York Giants. Newhouser saw action in game four, relieving Bob Lemon in the fifth inning. He faced two batters, failing to retire either of them before being pulled. The following season, Newhouser made just two appearances before being released by the franchise on May 11, 1955.

== Career overall ==
=== Statistics and achievements ===
"I'll say this about Hal Newhouser, he was the best pitcher I've ever played behind."

— George Kell, 1998

Newhouser finished his career with a 207–150 record and a career ERA of 3.06. He led the American League in wins four times in his career, in strikeouts, complete games, and ERA twice, with one season atop the complete game category. His 1,579 strikeouts and 170 wins between 1940 and 1949 were the most for any pitcher in that decade. Entering the 2025 season, his 207 wins placed him 107th all-time in career wins, tied with Bob Lemon and Carl Mays.

Under prominent sabermetrician and baseball historian Bill James' Win Shares system, Newhouser was deemed top pitcher in the American League from 1945 to 1948. James argued that he would have won the Cy Young Award had it existed during these years.

He ranks among the top five pitchers in numerous Tigers records. He ranks first in wins above replacement, with 58.8, two more than second-place Justin Verlander. His 33 shutout wins as a Tiger rank third all-time, his 200 wins, 212 complete games, and 1,770 strikeouts place him fourth and his 2,944 innings pitched ranks fifth. His eleven consecutive pitching wins from June and July 1946 set a Tigers record that would not be matched until Verlander pitched 12 straight in 2011.

W	L	ERA	G	GS	CG	SHO	SV	IP	H	R	ER	HR	BB	IBB	SO	HBP	ERA+	FIP	WHIP	H/9	SO/9	Ref.
207	150	3.06	488	374	212	33	26	2,993.0	2,674	1,197	1,016	136	1,249	47	1,796	19	130	3.27	1.311	8.0	5.4	

=== Playing style and reputation ===
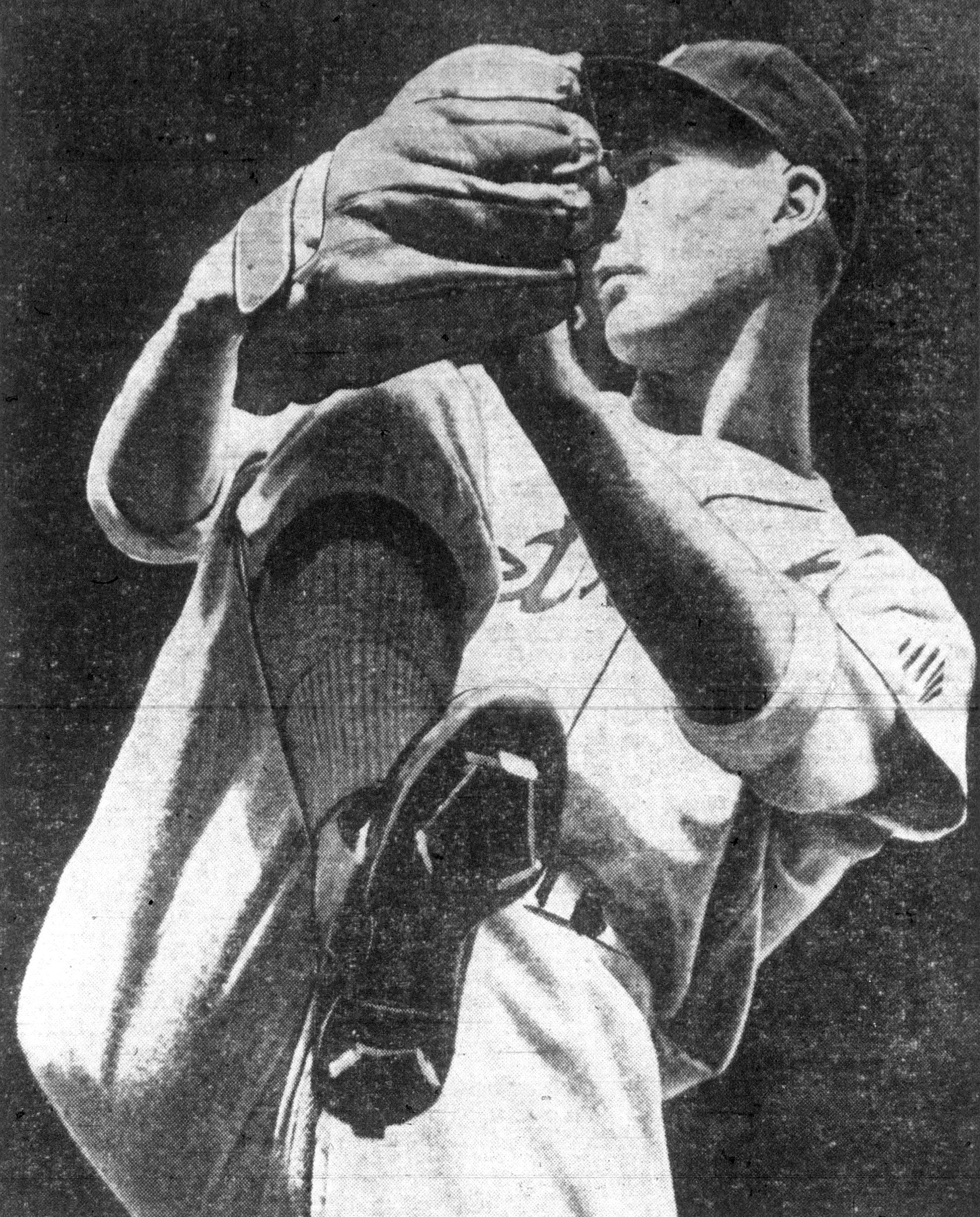
Newhouser winding up in 1945

Newhouser's early seasons were marred by lack of control of his pitches, especially his curveball. Even between innings, Newhouser's curves would go from well-located to hanging over the plate. After working on his curveball, Newhouser routinely threw three different types of curves: an overhand, or 12–6 curveball, a three-quarter curve which broke down and inside on a right-handed batter, and a slower curve. He usually employed the overhand curve when he had two strikes on a hitter.

One constant throughout his career was his high walk rate, even in his prime years. In his 223 starts during his All-Star years from 1942 to 1948, Newhouser allowed at least one walk in all but seventeen of them. He is the Tigers' career leader in the statistic. The Detroit Free Press called his style of play as "making good the hard way" due to his success despite allowing so many walks. In contrast, he was also known for his ability to generate strikeouts, especially in the peak of his career. In a 1981 piece for The Baseball Research Journal, James P. Maywar deemed Newhouser the tenth-best strikeout hurler of all time. In addition, he was known for his tenacity and for finishing games, completing 212 of his 374 starts. Former catcher Joe Ginsberg recalled that "you couldn't get the ball away from him – he hated to be pulled from a game."

Bill James compared Newhouser's career to that of Lefty Grove, due to his strikeout ability, his slow development time, and low offensive production against him. His temperament also drew comparisons to Grove, as he developed the nickname "Hurricane Hal" due to his violent outbursts. He once smashed an entire case-worth of Coca-Cola bottles against the clubhouse walls after being pulled out of a game. In contrast, he earned the moniker "Prince Hal" as a result of his dignified and courtly appearance.

== Post-playing activities ==
After his retirement, Newhouser became a scout for the Baltimore Orioles, ultimately becoming head scout. His first discovery was Milt Pappas, who he saw pitch at Cooley High School in Detroit and convinced the O's to sign him in 1957. He also convinced them to sign Dean Chance a couple years later. He left baseball for twenty years following this, becoming the vice president of a bank in Pontiac, Michigan.

Newhouser served as the Michigan area scout for the Houston Astros. After following 17-year old Derek Jeter at Kalamazoo Central High School in Kalamazoo, Michigan, he implored Astros executives to select him in the upcoming 1992 Major League Baseball draft. Prior to the draft, Dan O'Brien notified Newhouser that the Astros would select Phil Nevin of Cal State Fullerton, due to Nevin's lower signing bonus demands. Jeter was selected with the sixth pick by the New York Yankees. Upset with the decision, Newhouser retired as a scout and from baseball altogether.

== Personal life ==
Newhouser married his wife, Beryl, in 1941, after meeting at a party two years prior. Together, they had two daughters: Charlene and Sherrill. The family resided in Bloomfield Hills, Michigan, and Hal and Beryl remained married until his death in 1998.

== Death ==
Near the end of his life, Newhouser suffered from emphysema and heart problems. He died on November 10, 1998, at Providence Hospital in Southfield, Michigan, at the age of 77.

== Honors and recognition ==
=== Honors ===
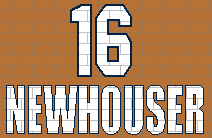
Hal Newhouser's number 16 was retired by the Detroit Tigers in 1997.

In 1962, Newhouser was inducted into the Michigan Sports Hall of Fame.

Newhouser's reputation as a "wartime pitcher," in which his most dominant seasons were during a period of decreased offensive talent, largely prevented him from making it to the National Baseball Hall of Fame and Museum early on. In his final year of ballot eligibility in 1975, Newhouser received 155 votes from the Baseball Writers' Association of America (BWAA), or 42.8% of eligible voters, far short of the 75% vote needed to be inducted. After three decades of eligibility, Newhouser was inducted to the Hall in 1992 by the Hall of Fame Veterans Committee. He was inducted alongside pitchers elected by the BBWA Rollie Fingers and Tom Seaver, and Veterans Committee selection umpire Bill McGowan, in front of a then-record crowd of 20,000 people in Cooperstown, New York, on August 2, 1992.

On July 27, 1997, Newhouser's number 16 was retired by the Tigers during a ceremony at Tiger Stadium. He was the fourth Tiger to have a number retired, joining Al Kaline, Hank Greenberg, and Charlie Gehringer. He was the first Tigers pitcher to have his number retired.

Bill James ranked Newhouser as the 36th-best pitcher of all time in his 2001 book The New Bill James Historical Baseball Abstract.

In 2015, Newhouser was one of the ten inaugural inductees of the Michigan Baseball Hall of Fame.

=== Awards ===
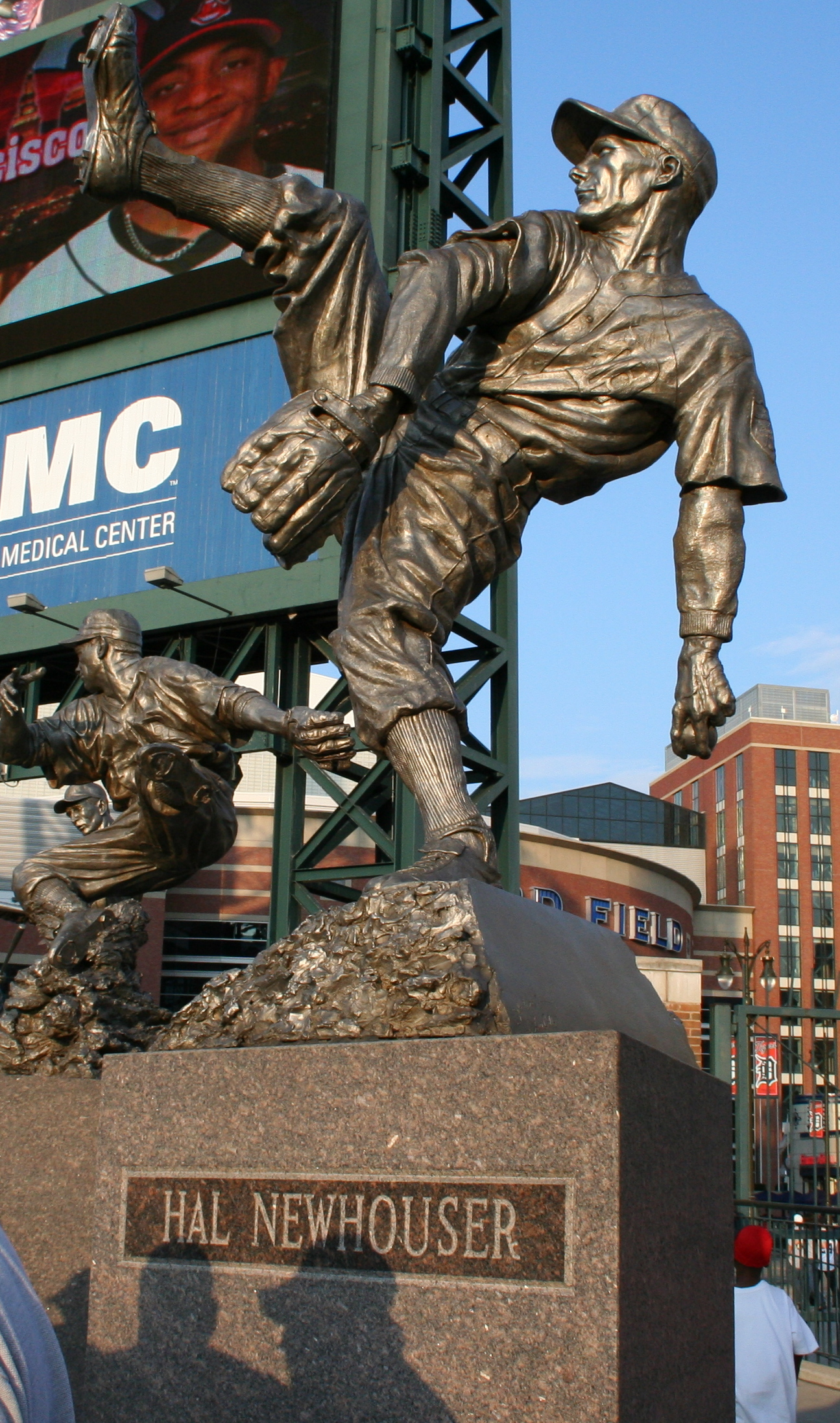
Statue of Newhouser at Comerica Park

Award	Time(s)	Date(s)	Ref.
AL All-Star	7	1942, 1943, 1944, 1945, 1946, 1947, 1948	
AL Most Valuable Player Award	2	1944, 1945	
AL The Sporting News Pitcher of the Year Award	2	1944, 1945	
The Sporting News MLB Player of the Year Award	1	1945	

=== Statistical highlights ===
Per Newhouser's biography on MLB.com.
Led AL

- Strikeouts (1944, 1945)
- Wins (1944–1946, 1948)
- Innings pitched (1945)

AL top–ten

- Strikeouts (1941–1949)
- Games played (1942–1947)
- Innings pitched (1944–1949)
- Wins (1944–1949)

== See also ==
- Major League Baseball titles leaders
- Major League Baseball Triple Crown
- List of Major League Baseball annual ERA leaders
- List of Major League Baseball annual strikeout leaders
- List of Major League Baseball annual wins leaders
- List of Major League Baseball career wins leaders
