= Kill the Umpire =

1950 film by Lloyd Bacon

- Directed by: Lloyd Bacon
- Written by: Frank Tashlin
- Produced by: John Beck
- Starring: William Bendix; Una Merkel; Ray Collins; Gloria Henry
- Cinematography: Charles Lawton Jr.
- Edited by: Charles Nelson
- Music by: Heinz Roemheld
- Distributed by: Columbia Pictures
- Release dates: May 15, 1950 (Los Angeles); May 28, 1950 (New York)
- Running time: 78 min.
- Country: United States
- Language: English

Kill the Umpire is a 1950 baseball comedy film starring William Bendix and Una Merkel, directed by Lloyd Bacon and written by Frank Tashlin.

Bendix had portrayed baseball legend Babe Ruth two years earlier in the biographical film The Babe Ruth Story.

== Plot ==
Bill Johnson is a former baseball player whose fanatical devotion to the game has cost him several jobs. He remains steadfast in one thing: he hates umpires. Matters are complicated by the fact that his father-in-law Evans is a retired umpire.

During a period of unemployment, needing a job to support his loyal wife Betty and two daughters, Johnson is forced by his father-in-law to attend an umpire school. Johnson initially tries to force himself to be expelled by school director Jimmy O'Brien, but after being asked to umpire a children's game, he comes to dedicate himself to his new job. He becomes an umpire in the minor leagues, where he develops double vision, earning him the nickname of "Two-Call" Johnson.

While on the train to umpire an important playoff series, gangsters unsuccessfully attempt to bribe Bill. When he calls a visiting team's player safe at home plate, the fans are incensed and a melee ensues in which the catcher is knocked unconscious. Johnson must disguise himself as a woman and engage in several madcap subterfuges to arrive at an important game on time, but his reputation is restored when the injured catcher recovers and praises him for his honesty. Bill is vindicated by the fans, but soon after, he becomes the target of their vitriol when he makes another call that they do not like.

== Cast ==
- William Bendix as Bill Johnson
- Una Merkel as Betty Johnson
- Ray Collins as Jonah Evans
- Gloria Henry as Lucy Johnson
- Jeff Richards as Bob Landon (billed as Richard Taylor)
- Connie Marshall as Suzie Johnson
- William Frawley as Jimmy O'Brien
- Tom D'Andrea as Roscoe Snooker
- Vernon Dent as Telephone Company Official (uncredited)
- Emil Sitka as Irate Baseball fan (uncredited)
- Henry Kulky as Baseball fan (uncredited)

Both D'Andrea and Kulky (as the irate boot-throwing spectator) would later costar with Bendix on his popular The Life of Riley television series.

== Production ==
The film project was announced in July 1949 with William Bendix in the lead role. Production was scheduled for October to coincide with the conclusion of the 1949 Major League Baseball season so that some of the famous players would become available. Filming began on October 17 and wrapped by the end of November. Exteriors were filmed at 11 baseball diamonds within a 30-mile radius of Los Angeles.

To prepare for the role, Bendix received private lessons from minor-league umpire and chief instructor Al Somers at the Bill McGowan School for Umpires in Cocoa, Florida. The school was later renamed for Somers and relocated to Ormond Beach, Florida, where it is now known as the Harry Wendelstedt Umpire School.

Managers Joe McCarthy of the Boston Red Sox and Casey Stengel of the New York Yankees were both considered to play managers in the film. Stengel, New York Giants manager Leo Durocher and Philadelphia Athletics manager Jimmy Dykes, all of whom resided in California during the offseason, visited the set frequently. Forty real umpires, mostly from the Pacific Coast League, were cast as the students at the umpiring school.

Major League Baseball players appearing in the film, all uncredited, include Duke Snider, Catfish Metkovich, Lou Stringer, Jerry Priddy, Willie Ramsdell, Irv Noren, Jim Baxes and Pinky Woods.

== Reception ==
In a contemporary review for The New York Times, critic A. H. Weiler called Kill the Umpire "strictly minor league stuff" and wrote: "[W]hile it keeps trying for laughs continuously, it connects with only a few before going down swinging. ... William Bendix does well by a role which calls for him to contribute a record number of grimaces and double-takes. If he seems somewhat silly at a student at the school, where the curricula seems to consist of learning how to call 'strike' and 'yer out' with gestures, he must be credited with approaching the whole business good-naturedly and professionally."

Critic John L. Scott of the Los Angeles Times wrote: "Diamond devotees should get a chuckle out of 'Kill the Umpire' despite the liberties it takes with the great American game. Some spectators will call it 'hilarious,' others 'inane.'"

== See also ==
- List of baseball films
