= Wish Egan =

American baseball player (1881–1951)

- Pitcher
- Born: June 16, 1881; Evart, Michigan, U.S.
- Died: April 13, 1951 (aged 69); Detroit, Michigan, U.S.
- Batted: Right Threw: Right

MLB debut
- September 3, 1902, for the Detroit Tigers

Last MLB appearance
- July 23, 1906, for the St. Louis Cardinals

MLB statistics
- Win–loss record: 8–26
- Earned run average: 3.83
- Strikeouts: 52
- Stats at Baseball Reference

Teams
- Detroit Tigers (1902); St. Louis Cardinals (1905–1906)

Aloysius Jerome "Wish" Egan (June 16, 1881 – April 13, 1951) was an American Major League Baseball player and scout.

== Playing career ==
Born in Evart, Michigan, Egan played three seasons as a pitcher for the Detroit Tigers (1902) and St. Louis Cardinals (1905–1906). He started 3 games for the Tigers in September 1902. Despite pitching 2 complete games with a 2.86 earned run average, Wish was 0–2 for the Tigers. In 1905, Wish was 6–15 as a starter for the Cardinals (including 19 complete games) before an arm injury ended his playing career.

== Scout ==
Wish joined the Tigers organization as a scout (and occasionally as a coach) in 1910 and remained with the club for over 40 years until his death in 1951. His discoveries as a scout included Hal Newhouser, Dizzy Trout, Jim Bunning, Roy Cullenbine, Hoot Evers, Dick Wakefield, Johnny Lipon, Stubby Overmire, Art Houtteman, and Barney McCosky. And it was at his urging that the Tigers traded Barney McCosky for George Kell in 1946. Egan reportedly started scouting Hal Newhouser when Newhouser was playing Legion ball at age 15.

Egan developed a reputation as a tenacious talent scout. After his death, sportswriter Francis Stann wrote in Baseball Digest:

He used to descend into mine shafts to talk to fathers of boys who couldn't sign contracts because they were under age. He's been known to time a visit to a youngster's home while school still was in session and wipe dishes for the mother awaiting the boy's return. 'Parents are often underrated people,' Wish philosophized on occasion. 'I liked 'em on my side.'

In addition to his player discoveries, Wish Egan is also credited with having chosen the Tigers' spring training location in Lakeland, Florida. An article from The Sporting News in 1933 included an interview with Egan about the new training location. The article credited Egan as "the Tiger scout, who selected the site." The article also noted: "Egan made many contacts in Lakeland and found the city happy over the prospect of once more being the host to a big league club. It has not had such an opportunity since the Cleveland Indians decided to move from there several years ago and is looking forward eagerly to renewing the experience." The relationship between the Tigers and Lakeland is now the longest relationship in baseball between a team and its spring training home, with the Tigers current agreement with the city running through 2036.

== Death ==
In 1949, Egan was diagnosed with cancer, and he spent much of the next two years in a hospital. He died in 1951.
