= 1948 Major League Baseball All-Star Game =

1948 American baseball competition

	1	2	3	4	5	6	7	8	9	R	H	E
National League	2	0	0	0	0	0	0	0	0	2	8	0
American League	0	1	1	3	0	0	0	0	0	5	6	0
- Date: July 13, 1948
- Venue: Sportsman's Park
- City: St. Louis, Missouri
- Managers: Leo Durocher (Brooklyn Dodgers); Bucky Harris (New York Yankees)
- Attendance: 34,009
- Ceremonial first pitch: Burt Shotton
- Television: KSD (STL)
- TV announcers: Bob Ingham
- Radio: Mutual
- Radio announcers: Mel Allen, Jim Britt and France Laux

The 1948 Major League Baseball All-Star Game was the 15th playing of the midsummer classic between the all-stars of the American League (AL) and National League (NL), the two leagues comprising Major League Baseball. The game was held on July 13, 1948, at Sportsman's Park in St. Louis, Missouri, the home of both the St. Louis Browns of the American League (who were the designated host team) and the St. Louis Cardinals of the National League. The game resulted in the American League defeating the National League 5–2.

This was the first All-Star Game to be broadcast on television, albeit only locally. Richie Ashburn became only the third rookie player in MLB history to start in an All-Star Game after Joe DiMaggio, (1939) and Dick Wakefield, (1943).

== Browns in the game ==
The lone representative of the host team was Al Zarilla, a reserve outfielder for the AL, who entered the game playing right field in the top of the 5th inning, and was hitless in two at bats.

== Starting lineups ==
Players in italics have since been inducted into the National Baseball Hall of Fame.

=== National League ===
- Richie Ashburn, cf
- Red Schoendienst, 2b – starting in place of Eddie Stanky, due to injury
- Stan Musial, lf
- Johnny Mize, 1b
- Enos Slaughter, rf
- Andy Pafko, 3b
- Walker Cooper, c
- Pee Wee Reese, ss
- Ralph Branca, p

=== American League ===
- Pat Mullin, rf
- Tommy Henrich, lf - starting in place of Ted Williams, due to injury
- Lou Boudreau, ss
- Joe Gordon, 2b
- Hoot Evers, cf - starting in place of Joe DiMaggio, due to injury
- Ken Keltner, 3b - starting in place of George Kell, due to injury
- George McQuinn, 1b
- Buddy Rosar, c
- Walt Masterson, p

=== Umpires ===
Position	Umpire	League
Home Plate	Charlie Berry	American
First Base	Bill Stewart	National
Second Base	Joe Paparella	American
Third Base	Beans Reardon	National

The umpires changed assignments in the middle of the fifth inning – Berry and Reardon swapped positions, also Stewart and Paparella swapped positions.

== Synopsis ==
Tuesday, July 13, 1948 1:30 pm (CT) at Sportsman's Park in St. Louis, Missouri
Team	1	2	3	4	5	6	7	8	9	R	H	E
National League	2	0	0	0	0	0	0	0	0	2	8	0
American League	0	1	1	3	0	0	0	0	X	5	6	0
WP: Vic Raschi (1–0) LP: Johnny Schmitz (0–1) Sv: Joe Coleman (1); Home runs: NL: Stan Musial (1); AL: Hoot Evers (1)

The NL scored two runs in the top of the 1st inning, on a leadoff single by rookie Richie Ashburn, and later a two-run home run by Stan Musial with one out. It would be the only runs the NL would score. The AL got one run back in the bottom of the 2nd inning, on a home run by Hoot Evers. They later tied the score at 2–2 in the bottom of the 3rd, after two walks, a steal of third base by Mickey Vernon, and a sacrifice fly from Lou Boudreau. In the bottom of the 4th, the AL pulled ahead with 3 runs; after loading the bases with two singles and a walk, Vic Raschi drove in two runs with a single, followed by one more run scoring on a lineout by Joe DiMaggio. With the AL up 5–2, there would be no more scoring, despite the NL loading the bases in the 6th inning.
