= 1992 Baseball Hall of Fame balloting =

Elections to the Baseball Hall of Fame

National Baseball

Hall of Fame and Museum
- New inductees: 4
- via BBWAA: 2
- via Veterans Committee: 2
- Total inductees: 215
- Induction date: August 2, 1992

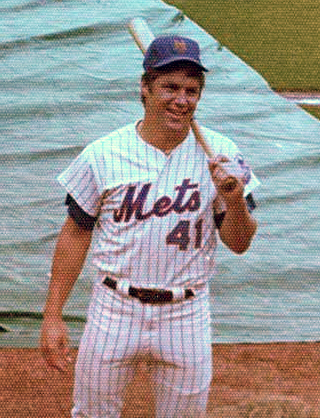
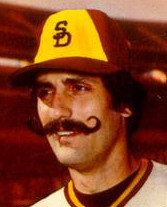
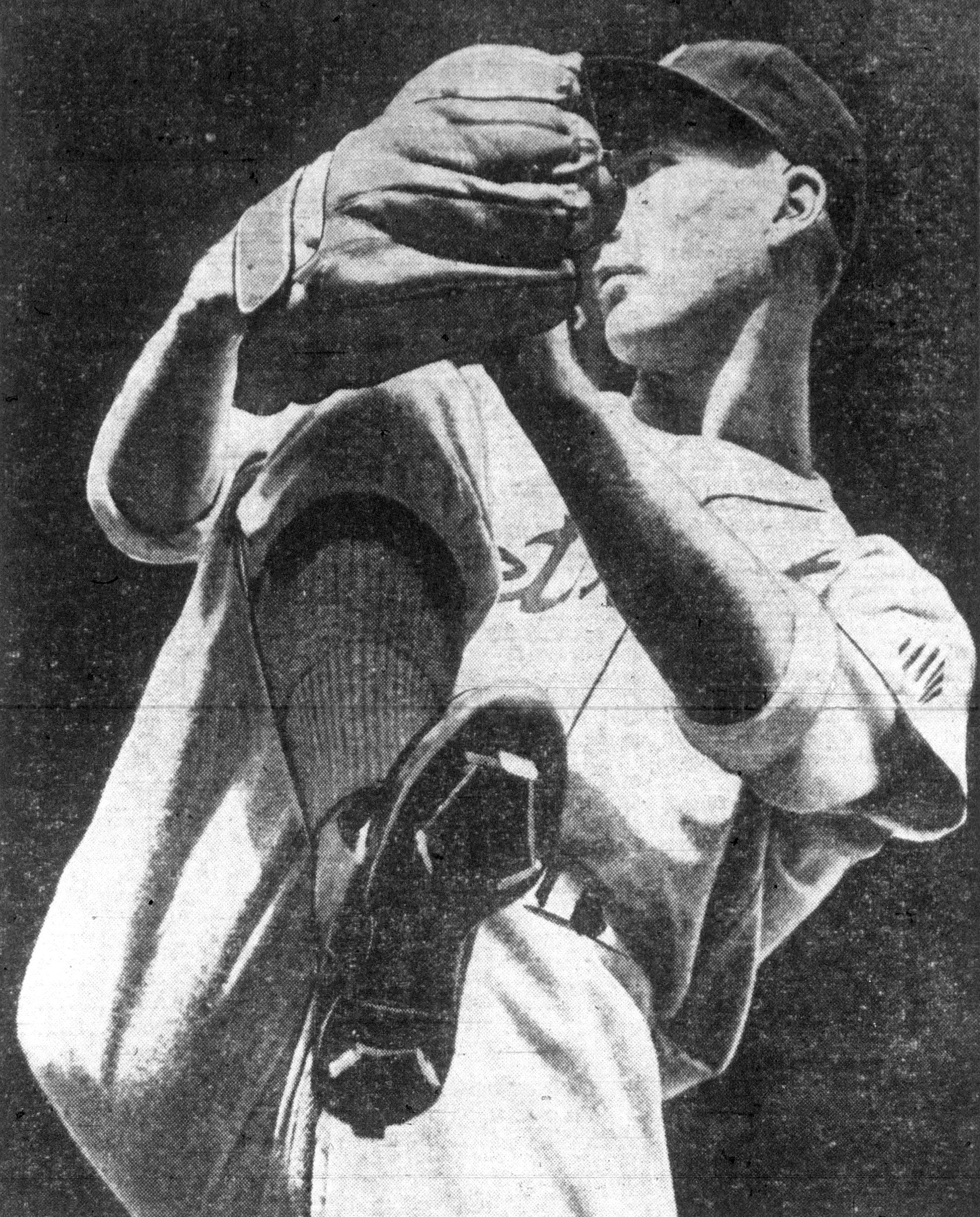
1992 inductees (L-R): Tom Seaver, Rollie Fingers, and Hal Newhouser. Bill McGowan was also inducted.

Elections to the Baseball Hall of Fame for 1992 followed the system in place since 1978. The Baseball Writers' Association of America (BBWAA) voted by mail to select from recent major league players and elected two, Rollie Fingers and Tom Seaver. The Veterans Committee met in closed sessions to consider older major league players as well as managers, umpires, executives, and figures from the Negro leagues. It selected two, Bill McGowan and Hal Newhouser. A formal induction ceremony was held in Cooperstown, New York, on August 2, 1992.

== BBWAA election ==
The BBWAA was authorized to elect players active in 1972 or later, but not after 1986; the ballot included candidates from the 1991 ballot who received at least 5% of the vote but were not elected, along with selected players, chosen by a screening committee, whose last appearance was in 1986. All 10-year members of the BBWAA were eligible to vote.

Voters were instructed to cast votes for up to 10 candidates; any candidate receiving votes on at least 75% of the ballots would be honored with induction to the Hall. Results of the 1992 election by the BBWAA were announced on January 7. The ballot consisted of 35 players; a total of 430 ballots were cast, with 323 votes required for election. A total of 2,609 individual votes were cast, an average of 6.07 per ballot—a record low up to this point, though broken the next election, which averaged 5.76 votes per ballot. Those candidates receiving less than 5% of the vote will not appear on future BBWAA ballots, but may eventually be considered by the Veterans Committee.

Candidates who were eligible for the first time are indicated here with a dagger (†). The two candidates who received at least 75% of the vote and was elected is indicated in bold italics; candidates who have since been elected in subsequent elections are indicated in italics. The 14 candidates who received less than 5% of the vote, thus becoming ineligible for future BBWAA consideration, are indicated with an asterisk (*).

Maury Wills and Bill Mazeroski were on the ballot for the 15th and final time.

| Player | Votes | Percent | Change | Year |
|---|---|---|---|---|
| **Tom Seaver**† | **425** | **98.8** | - | 1st |
| **Rollie Fingers** | **349** | **81.2** | ▲15.5% | 2nd |
| Orlando Cepeda | 246 | 57.2 | ▲13.9% | 13th |
| Tony Pérez† | 215 | 50.0 | - | 1st |
| Bill Mazeroski | 182 | 42.3 | ▲10.2% | 15th |
| Tony Oliva | 175 | 40.7 | ▲4.6% | 11th |
| Ron Santo | 136 | 31.6 | ▲5.4% | 9th |
| Jim Kaat | 114 | 26.5 | ▲12.5% | 4th |
| Maury Wills | 110 | 25.6 | ▲11.8% | 15th |
| Ken Boyer | 71 | 16.5 | ▲3.4% | 13th |
| Dick Allen | 69 | 16.0 | ▲2.7% | 10th |
| Minnie Miñoso | 69 | 16.0 | ▲7.4% | 8th |
| Joe Torre | 62 | 14.4 | ▲5.1% | 10th |
| Luis Tiant | 50 | 11.6 | ▲4.4% | 5th |
| Mickey Lolich | 45 | 10.5 | ▲3.1% | 8th |
| Curt Flood | 42 | 9.8 | ▲4.6% | 11th |
| Bobby Bonds | 40 | 9.3 | ▲0.5% | 6th |
| Vada Pinson | 36 | 8.4 | ▲1.6% | 11th |
| Thurman Munson | 32 | 7.4 | ▲1.1% | 12th |
| Rusty Staub | 26 | 6.0 | ▼0.3% | 2nd |
| George Foster† | 24 | 5.6 | - | 1st |
| Vida Blue† | 23 | 5.3 | - | 1st |
| Bobby Grich†* | 11 | 2.6 | - | 1st |
| Dusty Baker†* | 4 | 0.9 | - | 1st |
| Dave Kingman†* | 3 | 0.7 | - | 1st |
| Bill Russell†* | 3 | 0.7 | - | 1st |
| César Cedeño†* | 2 | 0.5 | - | 1st |
| Steve Yeager†* | 2 | 0.5 | - | 1st |
| Toby Harrah†* | 1 | 0.2 | - | 1st |
| Dennis Leonard†* | 1 | 0.2 | - | 1st |
| John Denny†* | 0 | 0.0 | - | 1st |
| Ken Forsch†* | 0 | 0.0 | - | 1st |
| Garry Maddox†* | 0 | 0.0 | - | 1st |
| Ben Oglivie†* | 0 | 0.0 | - | 1st |
| Gorman Thomas†* | 0 | 0.0 | - | 1st |
| Pete Vuckovich†* | 0 | 0.0 | - | 1st |

Key to colors
| Elected to the Hall. These individuals are also indicated in **bold italics**. |
| Players who were elected in future elections. These individuals are also indicated in plain italics. |
| Players not yet elected who returned on the 1993 ballot. |
| Eliminated from future BBWAA voting. These individuals remain eligible for future Veterans Committee consideration. |

The newly-eligible players included 20 All-Stars, seven of whom were not included on the ballot, representing a total of 70 All-Star selections. Among the new candidates were 12-time All-Star Tom Seaver, 7-time All-Star Tony Pérez, 6-time All-Stars Vida Blue and Bobby Grich and 5-time All-Star George Foster. The field included two MVPs (Foster and Blue), four Cy Young Award-winners (Blue, who also won the MVP the same year, Seaver, who won three times, John Denny and Pete Vuckovich) and two Rookies of the Year (Seaver and John Montefusco).

Players eligible for the first time who were not included on the ballot were: Bruce Bochte, Barry Bonnell, Enos Cabell, Al Cowens, Julio Cruz, Terry Forster, Wayne Gross, Marc Hill, Dane Iorg, Roy Lee Jackson, Cliff Johnson, Jim Kern, Rick Langford, Randy Lerch, Buck Martinez, John Montefusco, Omar Moreno, Bob Owchinko, Greg Pryor, Dave Rozema, Vern Ruhle, Dick Ruthven, Jim Slaton, Jason Thompson, Dave Tomlin, Jerry White, Terry Whitfield, Milt Wilcox, and Jim Wohlford.

On February 8, 1991, the Hall of Fame formally declared that persons on baseball's ineligible list would no longer be eligible for induction into the Hall of Fame. As such, Pete Rose was ineligible for BBWAA election, but received 41 write-in votes. These votes were invalid and thrown out.

== J. G. Taylor Spink Award ==
Ritter Collett (1921–2001) received the J. G. Taylor Spink Award honoring a baseball writer. The award was voted at the December 1991 meeting of the BBWAA, and included in the summer 1992 ceremonies.
