= Chet Laabs =

American baseball player (1912–1983)

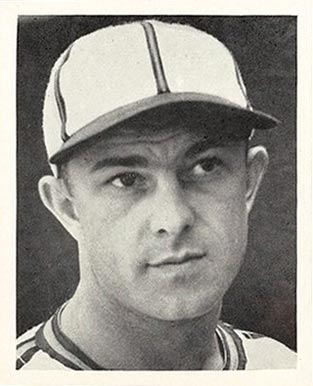
- Outfielder
- Born: April 30, 1912; Milwaukee, Wisconsin, U.S.
- Died: January 26, 1983 (aged 70); Warren, Michigan, U.S.
- Batted: Right Threw: Right

MLB debut
- May 5, 1937, for the Detroit Tigers

Last MLB appearance
- June 3, 1947, for the Philadelphia Athletics

MLB statistics
- Batting average: .262
- Home runs: 117
- Runs batted in: 509
- Stats at Baseball Reference

Teams
- Detroit Tigers (1937–1939); St. Louis Browns (1939–1946); Philadelphia Athletics (1947)

Career highlights and awards
- All-Star (1943)

Chester Peter Laabs (April 30, 1912 – January 26, 1983) was an American baseball right-handed outfielder. He played professional baseball from 1935 to 1950, including 11 seasons in Major League Baseball for the Detroit Tigers (1937–1939), St. Louis Browns (1939–1946) and Philadelphia Athletics (1947). He ranked second in the American League with 27 home runs in 1942 and was named to the 1943 All-Star team.

Laabs is often remembered for his role in two historic games. On October 2, 1938, he struck out five times, including the final strikeout, in the game in which Bob Feller set a new major league record with 18 strikeouts. Six years later to the day, on October 2, 1944, he helped the Browns clinch the only pennant in club history by hitting two home runs on the final day of the season against the New York Yankees.

== Early years ==
Laabs was born in 1912 in Milwaukee. He was the fourth of six children of Herman Julius Laabs and Jennie (Szulczewski) Laabs. His father was a German immigrant who worked as a molder at a steel fabricating plant and later as a fabric merchant and tavern owner. Laabs attended Milwaukee's Boys' Technology and Trade School. He began playing semipro baseball at age 15 with the Braman Coal Company team. Laabs was sometimes known as "The Polling Pole", owing to his Polish ancestry (on his mother's side) and his ability to hit long home runs.

== Professional baseball ==
=== Minor leagues (1935) ===
Laabs began playing professional baseball in 1935 for the Fort Wayne Chiefs of the Three-I League. In 87 games at Fort Wayne, he compiled a .384 batting average with a .699 slugging percentage and 56 extra-base hits. He was leading the minor leagues with a .427 average before missing a month due to an ankle injury. Despite the games missed due to injury, he led the Three-I League with 24 home runs. Laabs also had 96 RBI to win the league's Triple Crown.

=== Detroit Tigers (1936–39) ===
In October 1935, the Detroit Tigers purchased Laabs from the Milwaukee Brewers of the American Association. He attended spring training with the Tigers in 1936 but did not make the club. The Tigers decided to convert him from an infielder to an outfielder and sent him back to the Brewers to learn to play the outfield. In 1936, he appeared in 157 games for the Brewers, compiling a .324 batting average with 85 extra-base hits, including 42 home runs.

In the spring of 1937, manager Mickey Cochrane was impressed by Laabs' increased power. Laabs had built up his arm strength working as a steamfitter. Cochrane opined that Laabs had the best wrists in baseball and added: "He has massive shoulders and from the waist up he is as big as any giant. And his wrists and forearms are as good as you will find in the majors." The Tigers were sufficiently impressed that they sold outfielder (and future Hall of Famer) Al Simmons to make room for Laabs on the team's roster.

During his rookie season, Laabs appeared in 72 games for the 1937 Tigers. He hit only .240 with eight home runs and 37 RBIs in 242 at bats. When he was sent down to the Toledo Mud Hens in mid-May, the Detroit Free Press opined: "Although a brilliant prospect the youngster has not had sufficient experience to oust any of the regular from the Tigers' outfield." Laabs hit .410 in 21 games at Toledo.

In 1938, Laabs again split his time between Detroit and Toledo. He appeared in 64 games for the 1938 Tigers, 37 in center field and 17 in left field, and again compiled a disappointing .237 batting average with seven home runs and 37 RBIs. At Toledo, he hit .293 in 73 at bats. On October 2, 1938, he struck out for the five times, and was the 18th strikeout, in a game in which Bob Feller set a new major league record with 18 strikeouts.

Laabs began the 1939 season with the Tigers but appeared in only five games while compiling a .313 batting average. On May 13, 1939, the Tigers traded Laabs to the St. Louis Browns as part of a nine-player deal that brought Bobo Newsom to the Tigers.

=== St. Louis Browns (1939–46) ===
During the 1939 season, Laabs appeared in 100 games (95 for the Browns, 5 for the Tigers) and compiled a .300 batting average and .369 on-base percentage with 21 doubles, 10 triples, and 62 RBIs. Some 70 of his appearances in 1939 were as the Browns' center fielder.

In 1940, Laabs appeared in 105 games for the Browns, dividing his time between center field (28 games), left field (26 games), and right field (10 games). He compiled a .271 batting average and a .372 on-base percentage with 11 doubles, five triples, and 10 RBIs.

In 1941, he appeared in 118 games and again split his time between right field (64 games), left field (21 games), and center field (16 games). He hit .278 with a .361 on-base percentage 23 doubles, six triples, and 15 home runs.

The 1942 through 1945 seasons saw a talent drain from Major League Baseball as players were drafted or enlisted following the United States' entry into World War II. During these war years, Laabs emerged as a star. In 1942, he ranked among the American League's leaders with 27 home runs (second, behind Ted Williams), .498 slugging percentage (fifth), 99 RBIs (sixth), 55 extra-base hits (sixth), 259 total bases (seventh), and 90 runs scored (ninth).

In 1943, Laabs was selected to play in the Major League Baseball All-Star Game. He appeared in a career-high 151 games (116 in left field). His batting average dipped to .250, and he led the league with 105 strikeouts, but he also continued to rank among the league leaders with 17 home runs (fifth), 83 runs scored (sixth), 51 extra-base hits (sixth), 85 RBIs (seventh), and 237 total bases (eighth). Defensively, he led the league's left fielders with 15 assists and four double plays turned and ranked second with 208 putouts and a .982 fielding percentage.

At the start of the 1944 season, Laabs was working in a war plant during the season and was only able to play in night and Sunday games for the Browns. And even for evening games, his obligations in the plant prevented him from participating in weekday batting practice. His batting average dipped that year to .234, and he started only 53 games. On the last day of the regular season, he went from bench warmer to hero. With only three home runs to his credit during the entire season prior to the game, he hit two home runs against the New York Yankees to clinch the pennant (the only pennant in Browns' history) in front of a record-setting crowd of 37,815 at Sportsman's Park in St. Louis. The Encyclopedia of Baseball later referred to the game as "the most important in the history of the Browns."

During the 1944 World Series, the Browns lost a cross-town battle with the St. Louis Cardinals. Laabs had three hits, including a double and a triple, walked twice, and scored a run in 17 plate appearances.

In 1945, he appeared in only 35 games and hit .239 with one home run and eight RBIs. In 1946, he appeared in 80 games, 65 in right field, and regained some of his power with 16 home runs and 52 RBIs in 264 at bats.

=== Philadelphia and International League (1947–50) ===
On April 9, 1947, the Philadelphia Athletics purchased Laabs from the Browns. Laabs appeared in only 16 games for the Athletics, compiling a .219 average with no home runs and one RBI in 32 at bats.

On June 7, 1947, the Buffalo Bisons of the International League purchased Laabs from the Athletics. Laabs remained with the Bisons for parts of three seasons, batting .293 with 22 home runs and 76 RBIs in 1947 and .295 with 29 home runs and 81 RBIs in 1948.

In July 1949, the Bisons sold Laabs to the International League's Toronto Maple Leafs. Laabs appeared in 123 games for Buffalo and Toronto in 1949, totaling 22 home runs and 75 RBIs.

Laabs began the 1950 season with Toronto but was released early in the season. He then signed with the Jersey City Giants, also of the International League. He played in 99 games in the outfield for Jersey City. He led the International League with 30 home runs in 1950, and he was credited with being the "big man" in Jersey City's lineup and leading the team to a berth in the International League playoffs.

=== Career statistics ===
In 11 major league seasons, Laabs appeared in 950 games and compiled a .262 batting average, .346 on-base percentage, and .452 slugging percentage. He totaled 117 home runs and 509 RBIs. He finished with a .977 fielding percentage playing at all three outfield positions.

== Family and later years ==
Laabs and his wife, Mathilda, had a son, Chester, and a daughter, Patricia. In 1951, after retiring from baseball, Laabs worked as advertising manager for Modern Bowler magazine in Detroit. He then worked at a Detroit trophy company, Spike Lawrence Trophies. In 1983, Laabs died at age 70 in Warren, Michigan. Sources are in conflict as to whether he died from a pulmonary embolism or a heart ailment.
