= Joe Rue =

American baseball umpire (1898–1984)

- Born: Joseph William Rue; June 14, 1898; Danville, Kentucky, U.S.
- Died: December 1, 1984 (aged 86); Laguna Hills, California, U.S.
- Occupation: Umpire
- Years active: 1938–1947
- Employer: American League

Joseph William Rue (June 14, 1898 – December 1, 1984) was an American professional baseball umpire who worked in the American League from 1938 to 1947. Rue umpired 1,519 major league games in his 10-year career. He also umpired in the 1943 World Series and All-Star Game.

== See also ==
- List of Major League Baseball umpires (disambiguation)
