= Beaumont Exporters =

- 1920–1957; (1920-1942, 1946-1957); Beaumont, Texas

Minor league affiliations
- Previous classes: Class B (1920, 1956-1957); Class A (1921-1942,1946-1955)
- Previous leagues: Big State League (1956-1957); Texas League (1920-1942,1946-1955)

Major league affiliations
- Previous teams: Pittsburgh Pirates (1957); St. Louis Cardinals (1956); Milwaukee Braves (1955); Chicago Cubs (1954); New York Yankees (1946-1952); Detroit Tigers (1930-1942); Philadelphia Phillies (1925); Chicago White Sox (1924)

Minor league titles
- League titles (2): 1932; 1938

Team data
- Previous names: Beaumount Pirates (1957); Beaumont Exporters (1953-1956); Beaumont Roughnecks (1950-1952); Beaumont Exporters (1920-1942,1946-1949)
- Previous parks: Stuart Stadium (1930-1956); Magnolia Ballpark (1920-1929)

The Beaumont Exporters was the predominant name of a minor league baseball team located in Beaumont, Texas that played between 1920 and 1957 in the Texas League and the Big State League. Beaumont rejoined the Class AA Texas League (1983–1986) and evolved into today's Northwest Arkansas Naturals.

Baseball Hall of Fame inductees Hank Greenberg (1931-1932), Whitey Herzog (1952), Carl Hubbell (1928), and Hal Newhouser (1939) played for the Exporters and Rogers Hornsby was the Manager in 1950.

== Baseball history in Beaumont ==
The city of Beaumont was first represented between 1903 and 1905 by the Beaumont Oil Gushers, later renamed the Beaumont Millionaires in the South Texas League. It was later represented in the Texas League from 1912 to 1917 and 1919 as the Beaumont Oilers. After the Exporters folded, the city was later represented again in the Texas league from 1983 to 1986 by the Beaumont Golden Gators and in 1994 by the Beaumont Bullfrogs of the Texas-Louisiana league.

The Exporters first formed in 1920 and played at Magnolia Ballpark through 1929 and at Stuart Stadium thereafter. The team was ranked near the bottom of the Texas League standings during the 1920s. However, when the Exporters became an affiliate of the Detroit Tigers in the 1930s, its fortunes changed.

The 1932 club, featuring future Hall of Famer Hank Greenberg, won 100 games and swept the Dallas Steers in the playoffs. Greenberg led the league with 39 home runs and 123 runs scored, while pitcher Schoolboy Rowe, who would star with Greenberg on the 1934–1935 Tiger pennant-winners, posted a league-best 2.34 earned run average. The Exporters won another championship in 1938, behind pitcher Dizzy Trout, the league's MVP. In 1942, the team won the regular-season pennant, but fell in seven games in the playoffs. Then the entire Texas League suspended operations during World War II.

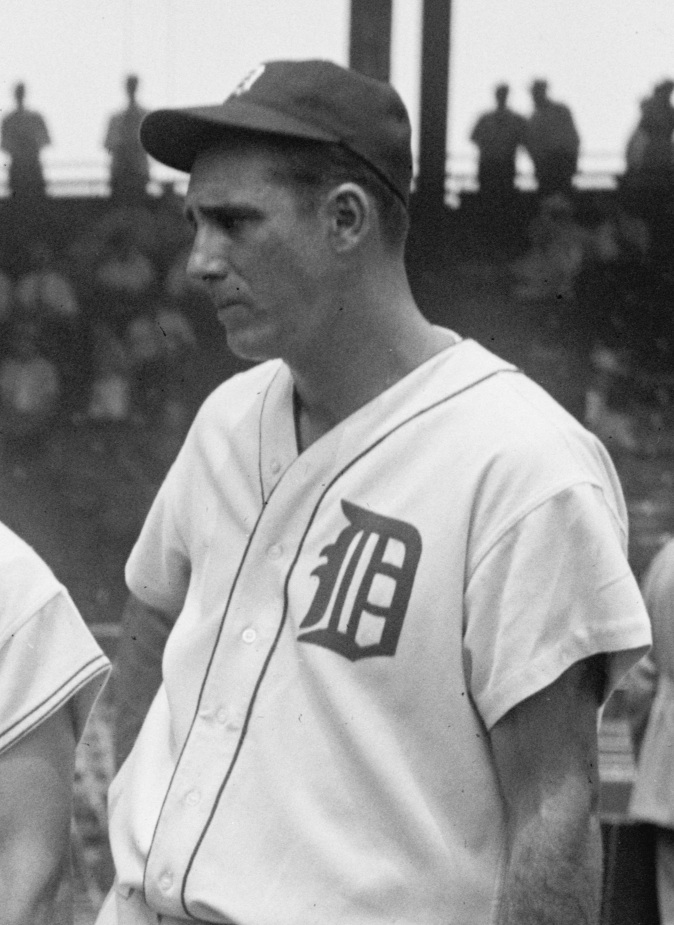
Hall of Famer Hank Greenberg

After the war ended, the New York Yankees replaced Detroit as the Exporters' parent club in 1946. A series of last-place teams was followed in 1950 with a championship club managed by Rogers Hornsby — but it was known as the Beaumont Roughnecks that season.

The Exporters name was restored in 1953, but no more titles followed. As an affiliate of the Chicago Cubs (1954) and Milwaukee Braves (1955), it trailed the other seven Texas League teams in attendance. The Exporters then moved to Austin in 1956.

A revised club known as the Exporters then entered the Class B Big State League in 1956 as a St. Louis Cardinals' affiliate. It struggled on the field, finished last in the BSL in attendance, and briefly transferred to Texas City, Texas, playing as the Texas City Exporters, during July before returning to Beaumont. The following year, 1957, Beaumont remained in the Big State League as the Beaumont Pirates, a Pittsburgh Pirates' farm club. The league then folded as an organized baseball circuit at the end of the 1957.

Beaumont remained without a minor league club until 1983 when the Amarillo Gold Sox, the Class AA Texas League affiliate of the San Diego Padres, relocated to become the Beaumont Golden Gators. The Golden Gators played from 1983 to 1986 before the franchise moved to Wichita, Kansas and became the Wichita Pilots in 1987. The franchise relocated to Springdale, Arkansas in 2008 to become today's Northwest Arkansas Naturals.

== Notable alumni ==
=== Baseball Hall of Fame alumni ===
- Hank Greenberg (1931-1932) Inducted, 1956
- Whitey Herzog (1952) Inducted, 2010
- Rogers Hornsby (1950, MGR) Inducted, 1942
- Carl Hubbell (1928) Inducted, 1947
- Hal Newhouser (1939) Inducted, 1992

=== Notable alumni ===
- Sandy Alomar Jr. (1986) 6x MLB All-Star; 1990 AL Rookie of the Year
- Elden Auker (1933)
- Bill Bailey (1906, 1919-1921)
- Russ Bauers (1954)
- Jim Brosnan (1954)
- Bill Brubaker (1932)
- Buzz Clarkson (1954)
- Joe Collins (1946)
- Clint Courtney (1947, 1950)
- Mark Christman (1936-1937)
- Joey Cora (1986) MLB All-Star
- Harry Craft (1951-1952, MGR)
- Roy Cullenbine (1936) 2x MLB All-Star
- Jim Delahanty (1916)
- Cedric Durst (1921)
- Ted Easterly (1920)
- Hoot Evers (1942) 2x MLB All-Star
- Dana Fillingim (1925)
- Pete Fox (1932) MLB All-Star
- Johnny Gorsica (1939)
- Sam Gray (1923)
- Bob Grim (1951) MLB All-Star; 1954 AL Rookie of the Year
- Ozzie Guillen (1983) 3x MLB All-Star; 1985 AL Rookie of the Year; MGR: 2005 World Series Champion - Chicago White Sox
- Luke Hamlin (1932)
- Dave Hillman (1954)
- Ralph Houk (1946) MGR: 1961-1962 World Series Champion - NY Yankees
- Tom Hughes (1926)
- Bill James (1919)
- Vern Kennedy (1954-1955) 2x MLB All-Star
- John Kruk (1983) 3x MLB All-Star
- Max Lanier (1954) 2x MLB All-Star
- Freddy Leach (1925)
- Mickey Livingston (1954-1955, MGR)
- Johnny Lipon (1942)
- Slim Love (1922)
- Denny Lyons (1903)
- Barney McCosky (1938)
- John McCloskey (1919)
- Gil McDougald (1950) 6x MLB All-Star; 1951 AL Rookie of the Year
- Shane Mack (1985-1986)
- Pat Malone (1924)
- Jakie May (1921)
- Heinie Meine (1921)
- Earl Moseley (1919) MLB ERA Title
- Pat Mullin (1937-1939) 2x MLB All-Star
- Kid Nance (1912)
- Al Newman (1984)
- Skeeter Newsome (1933)
- Al Nixon (1913-1916, 1919-1920)
- Steve O'Neill (1942)
- Stubby Overmire (1942)
- Mark Parent (1983-1984)
- Claude Passeau (1933) 5x MLB All-Star
- Willie Ramsdell (1954)
- Schoolboy Rowe (1932, 1938) 3x MLB All-Star
- Benito Santiago (1985) 5x MLB All-Star; 1987 NL Rookie of the Year
- Pete Schneider (1920)
- Rip Sewell (1932) 4x MLB All-Star
- Bob Smith (1921)
- Hal Smith (1952)
- Elmer Steele (1914)
- Birdie Tebbetts (1936) 4x MLB All-Star
- Bobby Tolan (MGR, 1984-1985)
- Mike Tresh (1933) MLB All-Star
- Gus Triandos (1951) 4x MLB All-Star
- Bill Trotter (1947)
- Dizzy Trout (1938) 2x MLB All-Star; AL ERA Title
- Virgil Trucks (1940 2x MLB All-Star
- Dick Wakefield (1942) MLB All-Star
- George Watkins (1927)
- Jo-Jo White (1931)
- Dave Wickersham (1957)
- Hal Wiltse (1923)
- Whit Wyatt (1931) 4x MLB All-Star
- Rudy York (1933) 7x MLB All-Star

== Season-by-season ==
| Year | Record | Finish | Manager | Playoffs |
|---|---|---|---|---|
| 1920 | 81-70 | 4th | Joe Mathes | |
| 1921 | 64-93 | 7th | Pat Newnam | |
| 1922 | 65-88 | 6th | Joe Mathes | |
| 1923 | 71-77 | 6th | Frank Edington (23-19) / Frank Kitchens (48-58) | |
| 1924 | 77-73 | 3rd | Albert Bernsen | |
| 1925 | 42-108 | 8th | Albert Bernsen / Andy Woehr | |
| 1926 | 76-80 | 5th | Jim Galloway | |
| 1927 | 56-97 | 8th | Jim Galloway / Claude Robertson | |
| 1928 | 50-106 | 8th | Claude Robertson | |
| 1929 | 72-87 | 7th | Claude Robertson | |
| 1930 | 68-84 | 6th | Del Baker | |
| 1931 | 94-65 | 2nd | Del Baker | Lost playoff for 1st half title |
| 1932 | 100-51 | 1st | Del Baker | League Champs |
| 1933 | 73-79 | 5th | Bob Coleman | |
| 1934 | 81-69 | 3rd | Dutch Lorbeer | Lost in 1st round |
| 1935 | 90-69 | 2nd | Dutch Lorbeer | Lost League Finals |
| 1936 | 69-80 | 7th | Dutch Lorbeer | |
| 1937 | 82-77 | 5th | Al Vincent | |
| 1938 | 99-57 | 1st | Al Vincent | League Champs |
| 1939 | 58-103 | 8th | Al Vincent | |
| 1940 | 88-72 | 3rd | Al Vincent | Lost League Finals |
| 1941 | 58-94 | 7th | Gordie Hinkle | |
| 1942 | 89-58 | 1st | Steve O'Neill | Lost League Finals |
| 1946 | 70-83 | 5th | Jim Turner | |
| 1947 | 60-94 | 7th (t) | Goldie Holt | |
| 1948 | 61-90 | 8th | Chick Autry | |
| 1949 | 55-97 | 8th | Chick Autry | |
| 1950 | 91-52 | 1st | Rogers Hornsby | Lost in 1st round |
| 1951 | 84-77 | 4th (t) | Harry Craft | Lost in 1st round |
| 1952 | 77-84 | 7th | Harry Craft | |
| 1953 | 65-89 | 8th | Al Vincent | |
| 1954 | 77-84 | 7th | Les Fleming (36-42) / Mickey Livingston (41-42) | |
| 1955 | 51-110 | 8th | Mickey Livingston | |
| 1956* | 57-83 | 7th | Ford Garrison | |
| 1957 | 61-63 | 3rd | Monty Basgall | |

* Team operated in Texas City, TX from July 2 to July 7, 1956
