= Stuart Stadium =

Ballpark in Beaumont, Texas, US

- Interactive map of Stuart Stadium
- Full name: Stuart Stadium
- Location: Beaumont, Texas
- Coordinates: 30°3′13.2″N 94°5′55.1″W
- Capacity: 7,500

Construction
- Opened: 1929
- Closed: 1955
- Demolished: 1955
- Cost: $120,000

Tenant
- Beaumont Exporters (Texas League) (1929-1955)

Stuart Stadium was a ballpark located in Beaumont, Texas and home to the Texas League Beaumont Exporters from 1929 to 1955 except for 1943–1945 when the Texas League ceased operations during World War II. The Lamar Cardinals baseball team also used the stadium as their home field for the team's first three seasons (1952–1954). The stadium was demolished in order to use the stadium grounds as the site of the Stadium Shopping Center.

== Exporters' Success ==
The Beaumont team was not always a good team, but they did have some years of success while at Stuart Stadium. The Exporters lost a playoff for the first half title in 1931, won the Texas League title the next year in 1932, lost in the first round in 1934, finished as runner-up in 1935 to the Oklahoma City Indians, won another Texas League title in 1938, finished as runner-up to the Houston Buffaloes in 1940, and finished as runner-up to the Shreveport Sports in 1942 before returning to mediocrity.

== Sources ==
- "Baseball in the Lone Star State: Texas League's Greatest Hits," Tom Kayser and David King, Trinity University Press 2005
- "The Texas League 1888-1987: A Century of Baseball," Bill O'Neal, c.1987
