= Tom Dunn (umpire) =

American baseball umpire (1900–1976)

- Born: Thomas Patrick Dunn; March 15, 1900; Athol, Massachusetts, U.S.
- Died: January 20, 1976 (aged 75); Prince George's County, Maryland, U.S.
- Occupation: Umpire
- Years active: 1939–1946
- Employer: National League

Thomas Patrick Dunn (March 15, 1900 – January 20, 1976) was an American professional baseball umpire who worked in the National League from 1939 to 1946. Dunn umpired 1146 regular season Major League Baseball (MLB) games in his 8-year career. He also umpired in the 1944 World Series and the 1943 All-Star Game.

== MLB debut ==
The first major league game that Dunn umpired – between Boston and Brooklyn on June 27, 1939 – lasted 23 innings, one of the longest games in MLB history. It was declared a 2–2 tie, after 5 hours and 15 minutes.

== See also ==
- List of Major League Baseball umpires (disambiguation)
