= Magnolia Ballpark =

Ballpark in Beaumont, Texas, US

Coordinates: 30°5′26.5″N 94°6′14.2″W

Magnolia Ballpark was a ballpark located in Beaumont, Texas, and home to the Texas League Beaumont Exporters from 1920 to 1932.The right field foul line measured 260 feet. The ballpark was located on Magnolia Ave. between Hazel and Long streets.

== Sources ==
- "Baseball in the Lone Star State: Texas League's Greatest Hits," Tom Kayser and David King, Trinity University Press 2005
- "The Texas League 1888-1987: A Century of Baseball," Bill O'Neal, c.1987
