= Al Somers =

American baseball umpire

Somers

Al Somers (July 16, 1905 – October 14, 1997) was an American professional baseball umpire who ran an early umpire school known as the Al Somers Umpire School, which later became known as the Harry Wendelstedt Umpire School.

== Biography ==
Somers was from Shenandoah, Pennsylvania. He attended school for a few years before learning to dig coal. He pitched briefly in the minor leagues before hurting his arm. Somers spent 22 years as a professional baseball umpire and retired from the Pacific Coast League. He worked for the Bill McGowan School for Umpires beginning in 1941. He served as the school's chief instructor.

When Bill McGowan died in 1954, Somers desired to purchase the school, but McGowan's family refused. He ran the school in conjunction with Bill McGowan, Jr. Before the 1957 season, McGowan's widow announced that she was retaining ownership of the school but that it would not hold classes that year. Somers went to see her in person and they negotiated the sale of the school to Somers. By the mid-1960s, the Al Somers Umpire School had trained 90 percent of the umpires in professional baseball.

In 1977, Somers approved Pam Postema and another female applicant as the first women admitted to the school. He later said that he had admitted Postema under threat of a lawsuit and that he did not think that a female umpire had the stamina to work in the major leagues. He also questioned whether any man would stay home while his wife traveled to baseball games.

In 1977 he also announced that umpire Harry Wendelstedt, the school's chief instructor for several years, would take over the school, of which the family continues control, now in its second generation of family ownership.
