= Hoot Evers =

American baseball player (1921–1991)

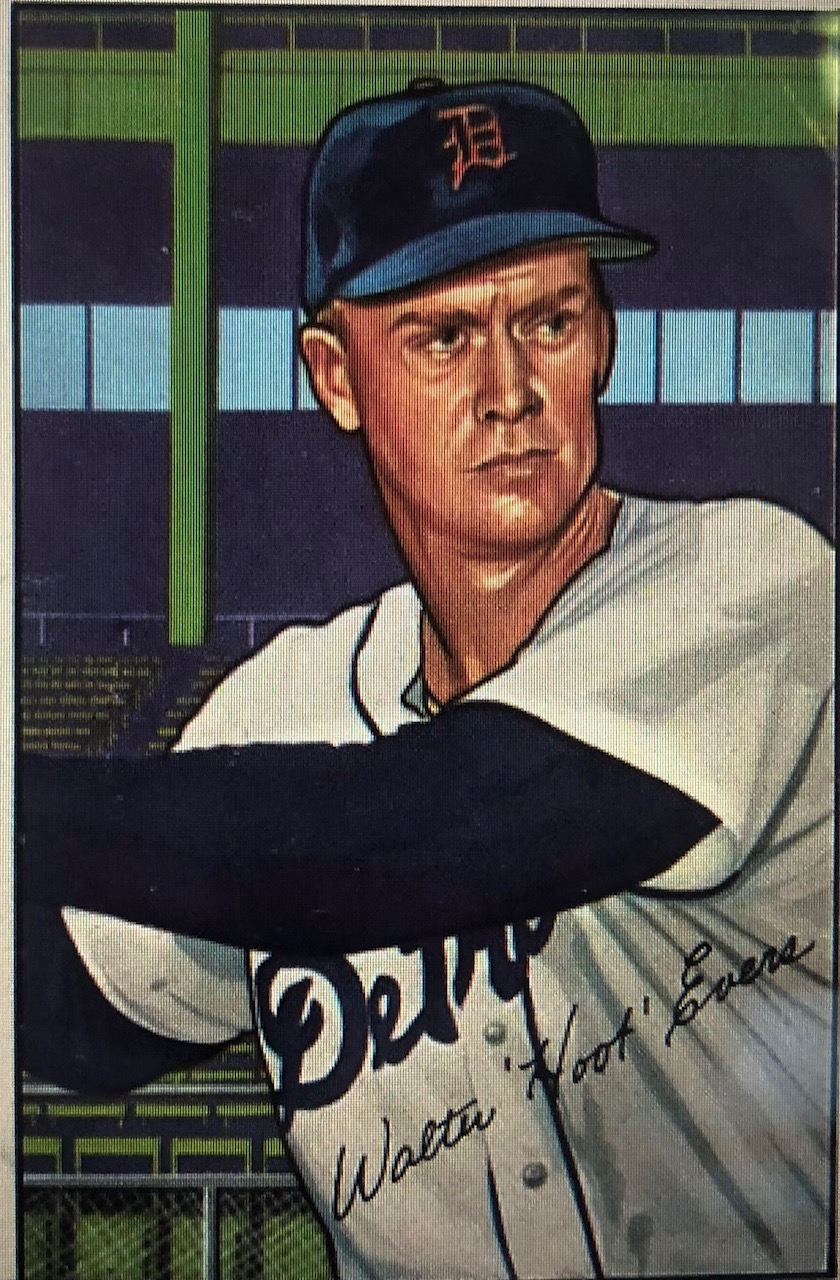
- Outfielder
- Born: February 8, 1921; St. Louis, Missouri, U.S.
- Died: January 25, 1991 (aged 69); Houston, Texas, U.S.
- Batted: Right Threw: Right

MLB debut
- September 16, 1941, for the Detroit Tigers

Last MLB appearance
- September 30, 1956, for the Baltimore Orioles

MLB statistics
- Batting average: .278
- Home runs: 98
- Runs batted in: 565
- Stats at Baseball Reference

Teams
- Detroit Tigers (1941, 1946–1952); Boston Red Sox (1952–1954); New York Giants (1954); Detroit Tigers (1954); Baltimore Orioles (1955); Cleveland Indians (1955–1956); Baltimore Orioles (1956)

Career highlights and awards
- 2× All-Star (1948, 1950)

Walter Arthur "Hoot" Evers (February 8, 1921 – January 25, 1991) was an American baseball outfielder, scout, coach, and executive.

Evers played professional baseball from 1941 to 1942 and 1946 to 1956, including 12 seasons in Major League Baseball with the Detroit Tigers (1941, 1946–1952, 1954), Boston Red Sox (1952–1954), New York Giants (1954), Baltimore Orioles (1954, 1956), and Cleveland Indians (1955–1956).

Evers missed the 1943, 1944, and 1945 seasons due to military service during World War II. He was selected to the American League All-Star team in 1948 and 1950. During the 1950 season, he compiled a .323 batting average with 67 extra-base hits and led the American League with 11 triples. Multiple broken bones, beanings, and other injuries slowed his production after the 1950 season.

After his playing career ended, Evers worked for the Cleveland Indians as a scout, coach, and farm system executive from 1957 to 1970. He then served as the Detroit Tigers' director of player development from 1970 to 1978.

== Early years ==
Evers was born in 1921 in St. Louis, and grew up in nearby Collinsville, Illinois. He was such a fan of Hoot Gibson's cowboy movies as a child that his friends gave him the nickname "Hoot". He attended Collinsville Township High School where he competed in football, basketball, tennis, and track. He was a star basketball player, punted and played back for the football team, and won the Illinois interscholastic championship with a javelin throw of 179 feet, 8 inches.

He then attended the University of Illinois where he competed in basketball, track, and baseball. As a sophomore, he compiled a .353 batting average and led the Big Ten Conference in total bases, runs scored, triples, home runs, and RBIs.

In January 1941, Evers was declared academically ineligible to continue playing for Illinois' basketball team. The week after he lost his eligibility, he signed to play baseball for the Detroit Tigers.

== Professional baseball ==
=== Minor leagues and military service ===
After signing with the Tigers in February 1941, Evers spent most of the 1941 season playing for Winston-Salem and Beaumont in the team's minor league system. He was called up to the Tigers late in the season and made his major league debut on September 16, 1941. He returned to Beaumont in 1942, compiling a .322 batting average and 46 extra-base hits in 152 games. He also led the Texas League's outfielders with 11 double plays from the outfield.

In the fall of 1942, Evers joined the Army and was assigned to the Waco Army Air Field (WAAF) in Waco, Texas. He played baseball with the WAAF baseball team during the war.

=== Detroit Tigers ===
==== The injuries mount (1946–47) ====
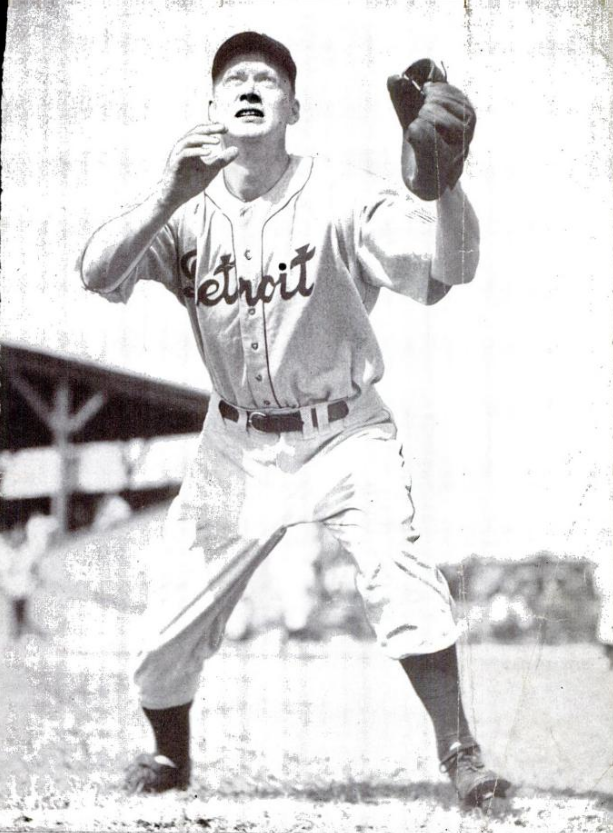
Evers with Detroit

Evers returned to the Tigers in the spring of 1946. He was leading the team in spring training games with a .400 batting average but suffered a broken thumb and ankle sliding into second base at the end of March. He returned to the Tigers in May. Then, on June 3, he collided with second baseman Eddie Mayo while attempting to field a pop fly; he suffered a broken jaw, was knocked unconscious and had to be carried from the field on a stretcher. He returned three weeks later and ended up with a .266 batting average in 81 games, 75 of them as the Tigers' starting center fielder.

In 1947, Evers played his first full season in the big leagues at age 26. He appeared in 126 games, 118 as the starting center fielder, and compiled a .296 batting average and .366 on-base percentage with 39 extra-base hits and 67 RBIs. Evers was hit above his left ear by a pitch on June 29. He was again knocked unconscious, carried from the field on a stretcher, and hospitalized.

Evers was tutored in Detroit by fellow outfielder Doc Cramer. Cramer said of Evers: "Hoot, and I mean this, was the most promising-looking young ballplayer I have ever seen come to the big leagues. He had all the fundamentals — the build, a good head, speed, and an arm, with good eyes at the plate. . . . The only thing I had to teach him was how to play the hitters, and he had all that the first time around the league. Taking care of him was the softest job I ever had."

==== Peak seasons (1948–50) ====
He had a breakout season in 1948, appearing in 137 games as the Tigers' starting center fielder. He was named to the American League All-Star team, played the entire game in center field, and hit a home run off Ralph Branca in the second inning to give the American League a 1–0 lead. For the entire 1948 season, he ranked among the American League's leading hitters with a .311 batting average (eighth), 33 doubles (ninth), and 103 RBIs (ninth). He also demonstrated good range in the outfield with a 392 putouts, third most by an American League outfielder. His .969 fielding percentage ranked fifth among the league's center fielders.

Evers followed up with another strong season in 1949. He appeared in 132 games, 80 in left field and 43 in center field. He compiled a .303 batting average and .403 on-base percentage with 34 extra-base hits and 72 RBIs.

Evers' best season was 1950 when he started 138 games in left field and led the American League in triples (11) and was among the league leaders with a .551 slugging percentage (third), 34 doubles (fourth), 67 extra-base hits (sixth), .323 batting average (seventh), 109 RBIs (ninth), 259 total bases (ninth), and .408 on-base percentage (10th). Evers hit for the cycle on September 7, 1950, in a 13–13 tie against the Cleveland Indians. As of May 2014, he remains the only major league player to hit for the cycle with another triple in the same game.

Evers was also a solid fielder, leading all American League outfielders in fielding percentage (.997) in 1950 with one error in over 325 chances. With strong performances in the field and at the bat, Evers finished 11th in the 1950 American League Most Valuable Player voting.

When Evers came to the plate in Detroit, Tigers fans greeted him with "a long drawn-out 'H–o–o–o–o–t.' It rolled down out of the grandstand and floated in from the bleachers in a bewildering wail that made newcomers to the park turn to one another in amazement."

==== Declining production (1951–52) ====
In 1951, Evers split his playing time between left field (66 games) and center field (43 games). His batting average dropped nearly 100 points from .323 to .224, and his RBI production dropped from 103 to 46.

In 1952, injuries returned to trouble Evers. On April 11, he was hit by a pitch, resulting in a fracture of his right thumb. After recuperating from the thumb injury, Evers returned to the Tigers' lineup for only one game in 1952. On June 3, 1952, he was part of a blockbuster trade that sent four Tigers (Evers, George Kell, Johnny Lipon, Dizzy Trout) to the Boston Red Sox in exchange for Walt Dropo, Fred Hatfield, Don Lenhardt, Johnny Pesky, and Bill Wight.

=== Boston Red Sox ===
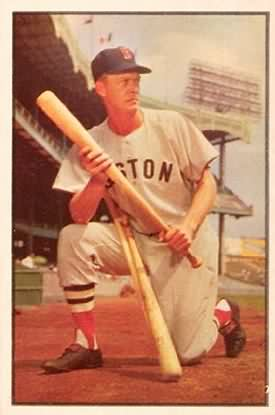
Evers with the Boston Red Sox.

Evers' offensive production never reached the levels of his peak years in Detroit. With Ted Williams serving in the military, Evers became the Red Sox starting left fielder in 1952, hitting .262 with 59 RBIs. A broken finger in 1952 reportedly hampered Evers' grip, and he never regained his stroke.

In 1953, Evers appeared in 99 games for Boston, 78 in left field and 16 in center field. His batting average fell to .240, and he had only 31 RBIs.

=== 1954–1956 ===
Evers continued to play in the major leagues from 1954 to 1956, but never regained his prior form. He was traded or sold five times in three years.

Evers began the 1954 season with the Red Sox but appeared in only six games before being sold to the New York Giants on May 18 for an estimated $25,000. He appeared in only 11 games for the Giants as a pinch hitter, and compiled a .091 batting average with a home run as his only hit in 11 at bats.

In July 1954, the Giants sold Evers to the Detroit Tigers. He appeared in 30 games for the 1954 Tigers, 13 as a starting outfielder. His batting average was .183 with the Tigers.

In January 1955, the Tigers sold Evers to the Baltimore Orioles for a price in excess of $10,000. Evers appeared in 50 games for the 1955 Orioles, 32 in right field, 21 in left field, and five in center field. He hit .238 in 185 at bats with six home runs and 30 RBIs.

On July 14, 1955, the Orioles traded Evers to the Cleveland Indians in exchange for pitcher Bill Wight. He appeared in 39 games for the Indians in 1955, compiling a .288 batting average in 66 at bats.

In 1956, Evers appeared in only three games for the Indians. On May 13, 1956, the Indians traded him back to Orioles for outfielder Dave Pope. He appeared in 48 games, 30 as the Orioles' starting right fielder, and compiled a .241 batting average. He appeared in his last major league game on September 30, 1956.

In 12 major league seasons, Evers appeared in 1,142 games and compiled a .278 batting average with 98 home runs, 555 runs, 565 RBIs, and 1,055 hits. He compiled a .983 fielding percentage at all three outfield positions.

== Later years ==
After his playing career ended, he worked in the Cleveland Indians' front office and later as a coach on Alvin Dark's staff.

In July 1970, he was hired by the Detroit Tigers as the director of player development. He held that position until 1978, when he became a scout for the Tigers in Houston.

Jim Leyland, who was a manager in the Tigers' farm system in the 1970s, recalled: "Hoot Evers was probably the number-one motivational guy for me. . . . If I had to look back and pick one person that really motivated me and really let me know what it's about, it would be Hoot Evers." Tommy John recalled Evers giving him advice when John joined the Indians organization. "I learned a lot from Hoot and still talk to him often," John wrote in 1991. "I'll never forget how helpful he was."

In 1991, Evers died at age 69 at St. Luke's Hospital in Houston. He had recently suffered a heart attack.

== See also ==
- List of Major League Baseball annual triples leaders
- List of Major League Baseball players to hit for the cycle

Achievements
Preceded by Elmer Valo	Hitting for the cycle September 7, 1950	Succeeded by Gus Bell
