= Harry Wendelstedt Umpire School =

Location
- Ormond Beach, Florida; United States; 29°18′25″N 81°07′13″W

Information
- Other names: Wendelstedt Umpire School, Harry Wendelstedt School for Umpires
- Former names: Bill McGowan School for Umpires, Al Somers Umpire School
- Founded: 1938
- Tuition: $2,450

The Harry Wendelstedt Umpire School is an independent umpire training program recognized by the minor leagues and major leagues. It is located in Ormond Beach, Florida. It runs for five weeks each early January through early February. The school is open to both men and women; the first woman ever to work a Major League Baseball (MLB) spring training game, Pam Postema, graduated from the school, as have a number of other female professional umpires. The school was previously known as the Bill McGowan School for Umpires and the Al Somers Umpire School.

== History ==
Umpire Bill McGowan founded the program as the Bill McGowan School for Umpires in 1938. The school was run by former umpire Al Somers after McGowan's death in the 1950s. Harry Wendelstedt was the chief instructor for the Somers school, acquiring the school in 1977, where it has stayed in family ownership, with son Hunter Wendelstedt in control since 2012.

== Facilities ==
The Wendelstedt Umpire School leases the Harry Wendelstedt Jr. baseball fields at the Ormond Beach Sports Complex. The school's lease is good through 2027 after being renewed for a decade in 2017. Students stay in a hotel offsite, and must commute to the classroom and fields for coursework.

== Curriculum ==
While the Wendelstedt Umpire School is in session, students work six days a week, Monday through Saturday, usually starting at 9am. Students train in a classroom and on the fields. Training on most days begins in a classroom, where students learn from two instructors, one reading from the Official Baseball Rules while the other interprets the rules. Students take 25 tests, and to qualify for advancement, must score a 70% or better. All tests are mostly multiple choice and true/false, and are all based on the teachings of the rules.

Following training in the classroom, students walk to the fields. Students learn from instructors on how to apply the rules on the baseball diamond. They also learn proper umpire mechanics. Students work in batting cages, where they learn how to track pitches and effectively call balls and strikes. Students will also participate in simulated games where instructors control certain situations to help teach and evaluate the students.

== Staff ==
The Wendelstedt Umpire School has produced more MLB umpires than all other schools in history combined. It has fourteen full-time MLB umpires and a number of minor league umpires on its staff. The current MLB umpires that have been instructors at the school include Lance Barksdale, Gerry Davis, Dana DeMuth, Doug Eddings, Bruce Froemming, Greg Gibson, Brian Gorman, Ed Hickox, John Hirschbeck, Sam Holbrook, Ron Kulpa, Jerry Layne, Randy Marsh, Chuck Meriwether, Paul Nauert, Charlie Reliford, Larry Vanover, Tim Welke, and Hunter Wendelstedt.
