= Bill McGowan =

American baseball umpire (1896–1954)

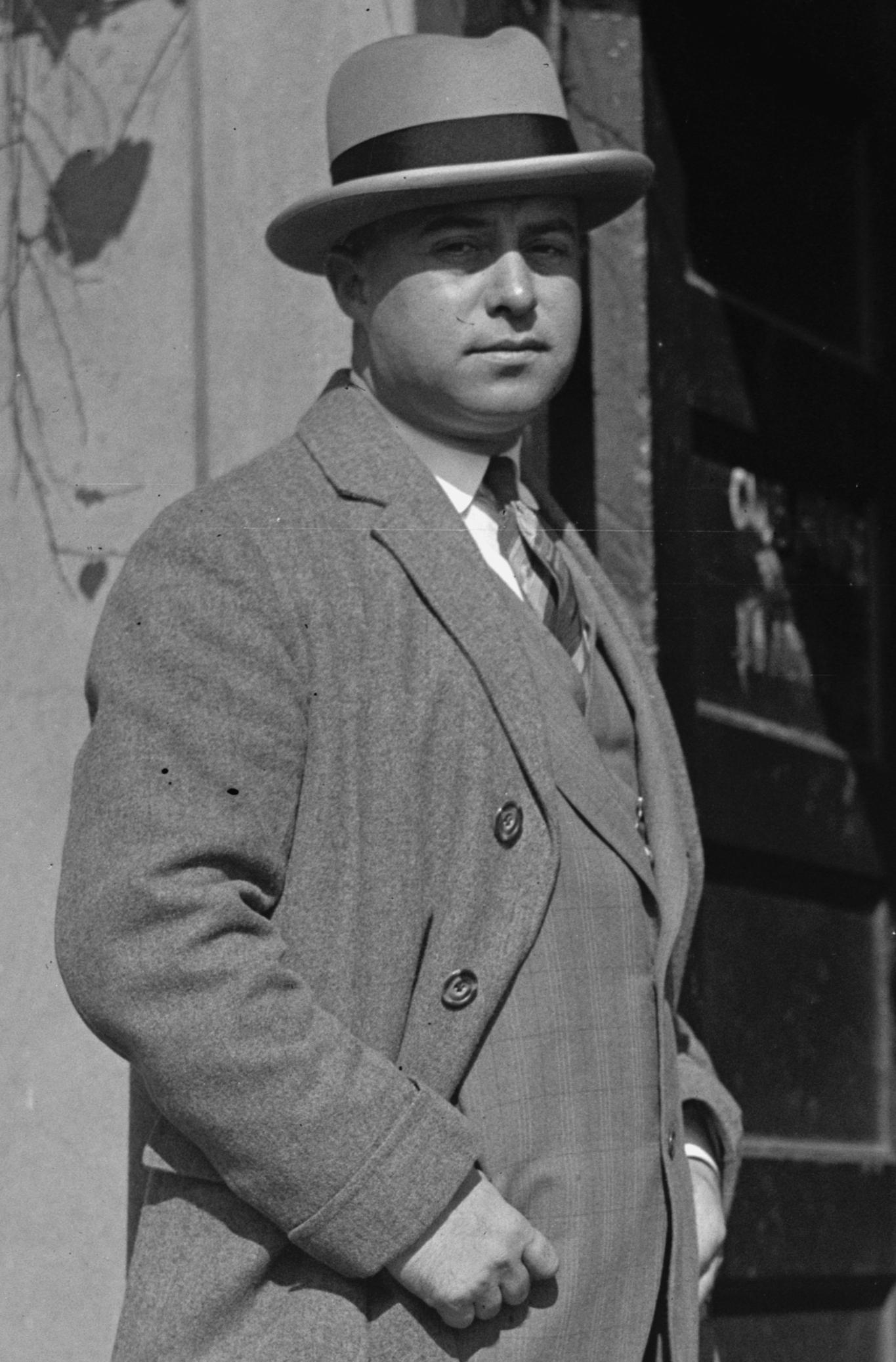
- McGowan in 1925
- Born: January 18, 1896; Wilmington, Delaware, U.S.
- Died: December 9, 1954 (aged 58); Silver Spring, Maryland, U.S.
- Occupation: American League umpire
- Years active: 1925–1954
- Spouse: Magdalein Ferry (m. 1918)
- Children: 1
- Baseball career

Member of the National

Baseball Hall of Fame
- Induction: 1992
- Election method: Veterans Committee

William Aloysius McGowan (January 18, 1896 – December 9, 1954) was an American umpire in Major League Baseball who worked in the American League from 1925 to 1954. McGowan founded the second umpire school in the United States. He was inducted into the National Baseball Hall of Fame in 1992.

== Early life and career ==
McGowan was born and grew up in Wilmington, Delaware. He began umpiring in the Tri-State League in 1913 at the age of 17. He moved on to the Virginia League two years later, the International League and New York State League in 1916, and the Blue Ridge League in 1917. During World War I McGowan served in the United States Armed Forces in 1918, and then returned to the International League in 1919. Following the 1922 season, McGowan began umpiring in the Southern Association, staying there until 1924.

== Major league baseball ==
McGowan moved to Major League Baseball in 1925, joining the American League and umpiring third base in his first game, the Boston Red Sox against the Philadelphia Athletics at Shibe Park on April 14. He continued to umpire for 30 seasons, including eight World Series (1928, 1931, 1935, 1939, 1941, 1944, 1947, and 1950) and four All-Star Games (1933, 1937, 1942, and 1950). He umpired in 2,541 consecutive games, missing a game on September 3, 1940, due to neuritis before continuing for another 14 years.

McGowan retired following the 1954 season. His final game was on July 27, between the Chicago White Sox and the New York Yankees at Comiskey Park.

== Off the field ==
McGowan spent time writing baseball-related newspaper articles in the offseasons, working for the New Orleans Item in the 1920s. McGowan founded what came to be known as the Harry Wendelstedt Umpire School in 1938, which was run by Al Somers after McGowan's death until 1977, when it was acquired by then still active National League umpire Harry Wendelstedt. It was then taken over by the Wendelstedt family, and run by his son, Hunter Wendelstedt, also a Major League umpire.

== Death and posthumous honors ==
McGowan died at age 58 at his home in Silver Spring, Maryland, after suffering two heart attacks in less than a week. He was buried in Cathedral Cemetery in Wilmington. He was inducted into the Delaware Sports Hall of Fame in 1977. He was also elected to the Baseball Hall of Fame in 1992 by the Veterans Committee, the first person born in Delaware so honored.

Baseball Hall of Fame Boston Red Sox slugger Ted Williams, who arguably had the best batting eye in baseball history, called McGowan "Number 1" among all umpires of his playing days.

== See also ==
- List of Major League Baseball umpires (disambiguation)
