= 1943 Major League Baseball All-Star Game =

1943 American baseball competition

	1	2	3	4	5	6	7	8	9	R	H	E
National League	1	0	0	0	0	0	1	0	1	3	10	3
American League	0	3	1	0	1	0	0	0	X	5	8	1
- Date: July 13, 1943
- Venue: Shibe Park
- City: Philadelphia, Pennsylvania
- Managers: Billy Southworth (STL); Joe McCarthy (NYY)
- Attendance: 31,938
- Radio: Mutual
- Radio announcers: Mel Allen, Red Barber and Bill Corum

The 1943 Major League Baseball All-Star Game was the 11th playing of the midsummer classic between the all-stars of the American League (AL) and National League (NL), the two leagues comprising Major League Baseball. The game was held on July 13, 1943, at Shibe Park in Philadelphia, the home of the Philadelphia Athletics of the American League. The game resulted in the American League defeating the National League 5–3.

This was the first major league All-Star Game scheduled as a night game. Left fielder Dick Wakefield became only the second rookie player in MLB history to start in an All-Star Game after Joe DiMaggio, (1939).

== Athletics in the game ==
The lone representative of the host team was Dick Siebert, starting first baseman for the AL, who was hitless in one at bat.

== Starting lineups ==
Players in italics have since been inducted into the National Baseball Hall of Fame.

=== National League ===
- Stan Hack, 3b
- Billy Herman, 2b
- Stan Musial, lf
- Bill Nicholson, rf
- Elbie Fletcher, 1b – starting in place of Frank McCormick, due to injury
- Walker Cooper, c
- Harry Walker, cf
- Marty Marion, ss
- Mort Cooper, p

=== American League ===
- George Case, rf
- Ken Keltner, 3b
- Dick Wakefield, lf
- Vern Stephens, ss
- Dick Siebert, 1b
- Chet Laabs, cf
- Jake Early, c
- Bobby Doerr, 2b
- Dutch Leonard, p

=== Umpires ===
Position	Umpire	League
Home Plate	Eddie Rommel	American
First Base	Jocko Conlan	National
Second Base	Joe Rue	American
Third Base	Tom Dunn	National

The umpires changed assignments in the middle of the fifth inning – Rommel and Dunn swapped positions, also Conlan and Rue swapped positions.

== Synopsis ==
Tuesday, July 13, 1943 9:00 pm (ET) at Shibe Park in Philadelphia, Pennsylvania
Team	1	2	3	4	5	6	7	8	9	R	H	E
National League	1	0	0	0	0	0	1	0	1	3	10	3
American League	0	3	1	0	1	0	0	0	X	5	8	1
WP: Dutch Leonard (1–0) LP: Mort Cooper (0–1) Sv: Tex Hughson (1); Home runs: NL: Vince DiMaggio; AL: Bobby Doerr (1)

The NL started the game with two singles, then scored one run on a sacrifice fly by Stan Musial. The AL jumped ahead 3–1 in the bottom of the 2nd, on a pair of walks followed by a home run from Bobby Doerr. The AL added a run in the 3rd, on back-to-back doubles by Ken Keltner and Dick Wakefield, and another run in the bottom of the 5th, on an error by NL second baseman Billy Herman with runners on first and third with two outs; the AL was up 5–1. The NL later got two runs back from Vince DiMaggio; in the 7th he hit a triple and then scored on a sacrifice fly by Dixie Walker, and in the 9th he led off the inning with a home run. But the NL was unable to rally further, resulting in an AL 5–3 victory.
