= Dick Wakefield =

American baseball player (1921–1985)

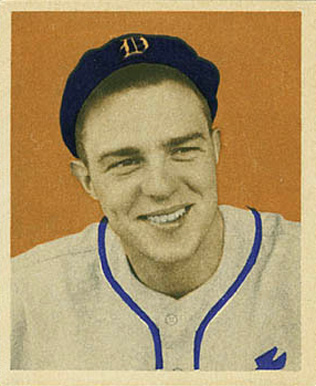
- Left fielder
- Born: May 6, 1921; Chicago, Illinois, U.S.
- Died: August 26, 1985 (aged 64); Redford, Michigan, U.S.
- Batted: Left Threw: Right

MLB debut
- June 26, 1941, for the Detroit Tigers

Last MLB appearance
- May 6, 1952, for the New York Giants

MLB statistics
- Batting average: .293
- Home runs: 56
- Runs batted in: 315
- Stats at Baseball Reference

Teams
- Detroit Tigers (1941, 1943–1944, 1946–1949); New York Yankees (1950); New York Giants (1952)

Career highlights and awards
- All-Star (1943)

Richard Cummings Wakefield (May 6, 1921 – August 25, 1985) was an American left fielder in Major League Baseball for 9 seasons with the Detroit Tigers (1941, 1943–1944, 1946–1949), New York Yankees (1950), and New York Giants (1952). Wakefield was a 6 foot, 4 inch, player who threw right-handed and batted left-handed.

== Early years ==
Born in Chicago, Illinois, Wakefield was the son of Howard Wakefield, who was a major league catcher from 1905 to 1907. The scouts started taking notice of Wakefield when he was in high school in Chicago. He recalled: "I was a skinny kid who could hit." Wakefield attended the University of Michigan where he played only one season, 1941, with the Michigan Wolverines baseball team. In his one season playing for the Wolverines, Wakefield hit for average (.372) and power (9 home runs), as he led the team to a 24–8 record and its first Big Ten Conference baseball crown since 1936.

== The first "bonus baby" ==
In the summer of 1941, Wakefield was a hot prospect who was invited for tryouts with Brooklyn, Chicago, Cincinnati, Cleveland and Detroit. Wakefield later recalled that his "criterion" in choosing the right team was "the highest offer." A photograph of a smiling Wakefield holding multiple "big league offers" is available from the National Baseball Hall of Fame and Museum. Legendary Tigers scout, Wish Egan, persuaded Detroit owner, Walter O. Briggs, Sr. to give Wakefield a $52,000 signing ($1,138,235 today) bonus and a car.

Wakefield was the first of the "Bonus Babies", and his bonus was "more than the aggregate amount that the entire starting lineup for many major league teams earned in a season." From the beginning, Wakefield felt that he was treated unfairly by sportswriters, many of whom he recalled made only $8,000 a year. "Most of the resentment came from the newspapers. Fifty-two thousand was a sockful of money in 1941 and the papers made a big deal of it. They were writing about me every day."

Wakefield brought some of the negative publicity on himself, as he developed a reputation for flaunting his money and not working as hard as other players. After receiving his bonus, he walked into a car dealership and bought a new Lincoln Zephyr even though he did not know how to drive. When he was threatened with a $25 fine for walking with his spikes in the locker room, he "peeled off the money for the fine while still walking." A 20-year-old Wakefield signed with the Tigers in June 1941 and played in his first major league game that same month, on June 26, 1941. Wakefield went 1-for-7 in a brief stint in the big leagues. He spent the 1942 season playing with the Beaumont Exporters, where he was named Most Valuable Player of the Texas League.

== Rookie season (1943) ==
Wakefield returned to the Tigers in 1943 and had a tremendous rookie season. When he was named the starting left fielder for the American League team in the 1943 Major League Baseball All-Star Game, he became only the second rookie player in MLB history to start in an All-Star Game after Joe DiMaggio, (1936). Wakefield had 2 hits in the All-Star game, including a double off Mort Cooper (the National League's MVP in 1942) to drive in Ken Keltner for the game-winning run. He led the American League in 1943 with 200 hits, 38 doubles, and 633 at-bats, finished 2nd in the batting race behind Luke Appling with a .316 batting average, and was among the league leaders with 275 total bases (2nd in the AL), 91 runs (3rd in the AL), 53 extra base hits (4th in the AL), a .434 slugging percentage (5th in the AL), and a .377 on-base percentage (6th in the AL). As a rookie, Wakefield placed 6th in the 1943 American League Most Valuable Player voting, and Wakefield appeared to be on his way to a tremendous career.

== Military service and 1944 season ==
In October 1943, Wakefield entered the U.S. Navy as an aviation cadet and was discharged in July 1944, when the cadet program was discontinued. Upon his discharge from the Navy, Wakefield rejoined the Tigers in mid-July 1944 and went on a tear, hitting .355 in 78 games and collecting an OPS score of 1.040. Wakefield was recalled up for service to the Navy in November 1944 and remained in the service until January 1946. In all, Wakefield missed half of the 1944 season and the entire 1945 seasons to military service.

While in the service, Wakefield met Ted Williams in Hawaii and bet him that he would top him in home runs, RBIs, and batting average when the war ended. They bet $1,000 on each statistic, with Wakefield losing on all three bets, as his post-war performance never returned to its 1943–1944 levels.

== Final years in Detroit (1946–1949) ==
Wakefield returned to the Tigers in 1946 but never regained the batting stroke of earlier years. From 1946 to 1948, Wakefield consistently batted between .268 and .283 and never again managed more than 106 hits or played in more than 112 games.

Even as his batting average declined, Wakefield remained a favorite of the owner's wife, Mrs. Briggs, whom Wakefield called "Ma". Mrs. Briggs would sometimes pick up Wakefield in her limousine on the way to the ballpark. In one history of the Tigers, Wakefield was described as follows: "Clearly out of the control of managers, disliked by his fellow players, and criticized in the press, Wakefield was an untouchable for many years because of his relationship with the Briggs family."

After Wakefield's batting average fell to .206 in 1949, even his relationship with Mrs. Briggs could not save him. Wakefield was traded to the New York Yankees in December 1949 for Dick Kryhoski.

By the time he left Detroit, he had clearly worn out his welcome. Time magazine reported shortly after the trade: "Wakefield has been successful only at driving his bosses to distraction. His teammates put him down as lazy and self-centered." After the trade was announced, Wakefield wrote a three-page letter to the press, announcing that "he was genuinely sorry for his sins in Detroit." He gave special thanks to Wish Egan, who had discovered him: "The courage he has shown in fighting for me during my pitiful exhibitions will live with me as a shining example of friendship."

Tigers General Manager Billy Evans admitted that relentless booing of Wakefield by Detroit fans prompted the trade. "Our Detroit fans were down on Wakefield so much that I felt sorry for the boy all last year. We liked Wakefield, but we wanted to trade him away from Detroit before they broke his heart."

== New York and Oakland (1950–1952) ==
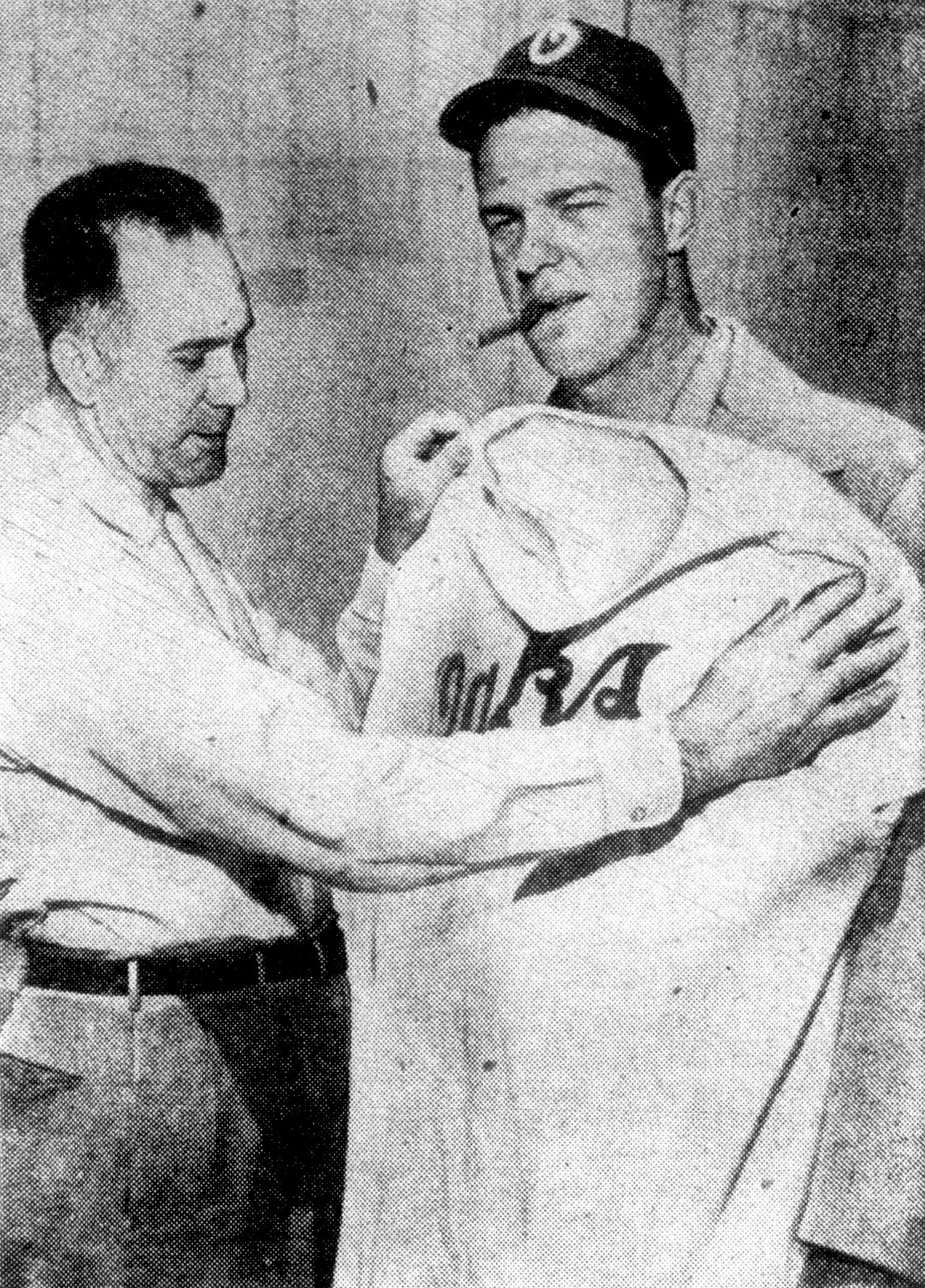
Pitcher Clyde Shoun (left) presents Wakefield with his Oakland Oaks uniform on May 29, 1950

Wakefield's problems continued in New York, where he had only two at-bats for the 1950 Yankees. At the end of April 1950, the Yankees traded Wakefield to the Chicago White Sox, but Wakefield refused to report unless a $5,500 salary cut imposed by the Yankees was reversed. Commissioner Happy Chandler voided the trade in mid-May, and the Yankees put Wakefield on suspension. Wakefield asked to buy out his own contract, but the Yankees refused and instead sold his contract to the Oakland Oaks of the Pacific Coast League.

Wakefield was the Oaks' fourth outfielder in 1950, where he hit .293 with 7 home runs and 38 RBIs in 87 games. In 1951, Wakefield was given a limited role as a pinch hitter by Oaks' manager Mel Ott, and he was released about two weeks into the season.

Wakefield attempted a major league comeback in 1951 and was picked up briefly in 1952 by the New York Giants, but he went hitless in two at-bats. Wakefield's baseball career was over at age 31.

== Later years ==
After his baseball career, Wakefield worked in taxes, bankruptcy courts and the steel industry. In 1983, Wakefield was inducted into the University of Michigan Athletic Hall of Honor.

Wakefield died in 1985 at age 64 in Redford, Michigan.

== Career statistics ==
G	AB	R	H	2B	3B	HR	RBI	SB	CS	BB	SO	BA	OBP	SLG	TB	SH	HBP	FLD%
638	2132	334	625	102	29	56	315	10	17	360	270	.293	.396	.447	953	10	3	.959

== See also ==
- University of Michigan Athletic Hall of Honor
- List of second-generation Major League Baseball players
- List of Major League Baseball annual doubles leaders

== Sources ==
- Career statistics from Baseball Reference · Baseball Reference (Minors) · Retrosheet · Baseball Almanac
- New York Times Obituary
- Oakland Oaks Biography and Photographs of Wakefield
- Donald Honig, "Baseball Between the Lines"
- Memories of Wakefield by Teammate Harvey Riebe
