= 1945 in baseball =

The following are the baseball events of the year 1945 throughout the world.

== Champions ==
=== Major League Baseball ===
- Negro League World Series: Cleveland Buckeyes over Homestead Grays (4–0)
- World Series: Detroit Tigers over Chicago Cubs (4–3)
- Negro League Baseball All-Star Game: West, 9–6
- Major League Baseball All-Star Game cancelled due to travel restrictions. However, inter-league games were played during the All-Star break.

=== Other champions ===
- Amateur World Series: Venezuela
- All-American Girls Professional Baseball League: Rockford Peaches

== Awards and honors ==
- Baseball Hall of Fame
  - Roger Bresnahan
  - Dan Brouthers
  - Fred Clarke
  - Jimmy Collins
  - Ed Delahanty
  - Hugh Duffy
  - Hughie Jennings
  - King Kelly
  - Jim O'Rourke
  - Wilbert Robinson
- Most Valuable Player
  - Hal Newhouser (AL) – P, Detroit Tigers
  - Phil Cavarretta (NL) – 1B, Chicago Cubs
- The Sporting News Player of the Year Award
  - Hal Newhouser – P, Detroit Tigers
- The Sporting News Most Valuable Player Award
  - Eddie Mayo (AL) – 2B, Detroit Tigers
  - Tommy Holmes (NL) – OF, Boston Braves
- The Sporting News Pitcher of the Year Award
  - Hal Newhouser (AL) – Detroit Tigers
  - Hank Borowy (NL) – Chicago Cubs
- The Sporting News Manager of the Year Award
  - Ossie Bluege – Washington Senators

== Statistical leaders ==
Any team shown in small text indicates a previous team a player was on during the season.

	American League		National League		Negro American League		Negro National League	
Stat	Player	Total	Player	Total	Player	Total	Player	Total
AVG	Snuffy Stirnweiss (NYY)	.309	Phil Cavarretta (CHC)	.355	Ed Steele (BBB)	.394	Frankie Austin (PHS)	.375
HR	Vern Stephens (SLB)	24	Tommy Holmes (BSN)	28	Jackie Robinson (KCM); Neil Robinson (MEM)	4	Josh Gibson (HOM)	8
RBI	Nick Etten (NYY)	111	Dixie Walker (BRO)	124	Herb Souell (KCM)	33	Roy Campanella (BEG)	47
W	Hal Newhouser^{1} (DET)	25	Red Barrett (SLC/BSN)	23	Booker McDaniel (KCM)	9	Bill Byrd (BEG); Roy Welmaker (HOM)	11
ERA	Hal Newhouser^{1} (DET)	1.81	Ray Prim (CHC)	2.40	Roosevelt Davis (CIC/CLB)	1.65	Garnett Blair (HOM)	0.96
K	Hal Newhouser^{1} (DET)	212	Preacher Roe (PIT)	148	Booker McDaniel (KCM)	117	Bill Byrd (BEG)	91

^{1} American League Triple Crown pitching winner

== Major league baseball final standings ==
=== American League final standings ===
American League
Team	W	L	Pct.	GB	Home	Road
Detroit Tigers	88	65	.575	—	50‍–‍26	38‍–‍39
Washington Senators	87	67	.565	1½	46‍–‍31	41‍–‍36
St. Louis Browns	81	70	.536	6	47‍–‍27	34‍–‍43
New York Yankees	81	71	.533	6½	48‍–‍28	33‍–‍43
Cleveland Indians	73	72	.503	11	44‍–‍33	29‍–‍39
Chicago White Sox	71	78	.477	15	44‍–‍29	27‍–‍49
Boston Red Sox	71	83	.461	17½	42‍–‍35	29‍–‍48
Philadelphia Athletics	52	98	.347	34½	39‍–‍35	13‍–‍63

Locations of teams for the 1942–1953 American League seasons
American League

=== National League final standings ===
National League
Team	W	L	Pct.	GB	Home	Road
Chicago Cubs	98	56	.636	—	49‍–‍26	49‍–‍30
St. Louis Cardinals	95	59	.617	3	48‍–‍29	47‍–‍30
Brooklyn Dodgers	87	67	.565	11	48‍–‍30	39‍–‍37
Pittsburgh Pirates	82	72	.532	16	45‍–‍34	37‍–‍38
New York Giants	78	74	.513	19	47‍–‍30	31‍–‍44
Boston Braves	67	85	.441	30	36‍–‍38	31‍–‍47
Cincinnati Reds	61	93	.396	37	36‍–‍41	25‍–‍52
Philadelphia Phillies	46	108	.299	52	22‍–‍55	24‍–‍53

Locations of teams for the 1943–1952 National League seasons
National League

== Negro league baseball final standings ==
All Negro leagues standings below are per MLB and Seamheads.

=== Negro American League final standings ===
vs. Negro American League						vs. Major Black teams			
Negro American League	W	L	T	Pct.	GB	W	L	T	Pct.
Cleveland Buckeyes	52	15	1	.772	—	72	31	3	.693
Birmingham Black Barons	37	27	2	.576	13½	62	48	3	.562
Kansas City Monarchs	35	27	2	.563	14½	62	48	4	.561
Chicago American Giants	38	35	1	.520	17	49	59	1	.454
Cincinnati–Indianapolis Clowns	27	40	1	.404	25	41	67	1	.381
Memphis Red Sox	15	60	1	.204	41	31	73	2	.302

Locations of teams for the 1944–1945 Negro American League seasons
Negro American League
Note: Clowns play in both Cincinnati and Indianapolis.

=== Negro National League final standings ===
vs. Negro National League						vs. Major Black teams			
Negro National League	W	L	T	Pct.	GB	W	L	T	Pct.
Homestead Grays	32	13	1	.707	—	53	29	3	.641
Baltimore Elite Giants	25	17	1	.593	5½	43	36	3	.543
Newark Eagles	21	18	0	.538	8	32	27	0	.542
Philadelphia Stars	21	19	0	.525	8½	35	32	1	.522
New York Cubans	7	20	0	.259	16	37	38	1	.493
New York Black Yankees	7	26	0	.212	19	16	45	0	.262

Locations of teams for the 1944–1947 Negro National League seasons
Negro National League
Note: Homestead Grays played in both Washington, D.C. and Pittsburgh, with the majority in Washington, D.C.

=== Negro World Series ===
- 1945 Negro World Series: Cleveland Buckeyes over Homestead Grays 4–0.

== All-American Girls Professional Baseball League final standings ==
Rank	Team	W	L	Pct.	GB
1	Rockford Peaches	67	43	.609	—
2	Fort Wayne Daisies	62	47	.569	4½
3	Grand Rapids Chicks	60	50	.545	7
4	Racine Belles	50	60	.455	17
5	South Bend Blue Sox	49	60	.450	17½
6	Kenosha Comets	41	69	.372	26

== Events ==
=== January ===
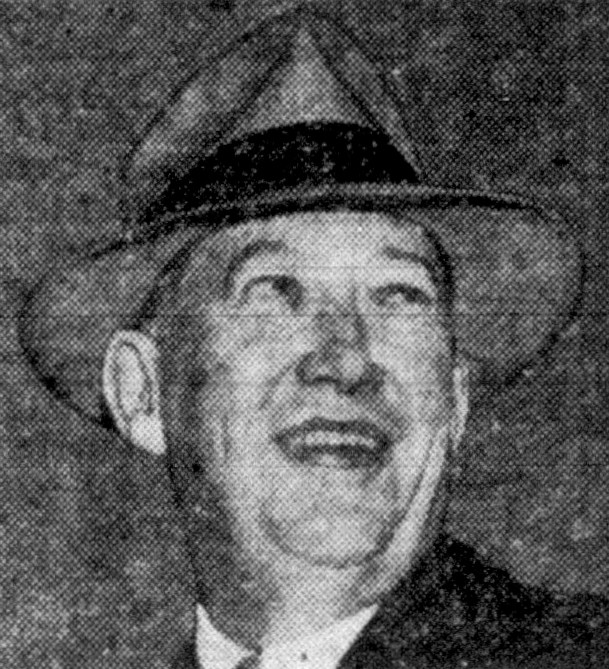
Larry MacPhail in civilian garb (1942)

- January 5:
  - As World War II continues to rage in both Europe and the Pacific, U.S. President Franklin Delano Roosevelt and key advisor James F. Byrnes openly ponder the mass mobilization of over 4 million discharged and "4-F" men into active service or war-related employment. A so-called "work or fight" order is viewed as potentially shutting down professional baseball for the duration of the conflict. The accelerated mobilization of men into the military will make the shortage of playing talent even more acute in 1945.
  - An estimated 5,000 professional baseball players are in the Allies' armed forces as 1945 begins; 44 will give their lives during the year.
- January 16 – U.S. President Roosevelt, who famously gave baseball a "green light" in January 1942 to continue during wartime, gives it a "yellow" signal at a news conference, saying the sport may operate in 1945 if it refrains from "hurting the employment of people in the war effort or the building of the Army and Navy."
- January 23 – Stan Musial enters the United States Navy. The St. Louis Cardinals' superstar, 24, will serve 15 months at installations in Maryland, Hawaii and Philadelphia before returning to baseball in 1946. His absence will be felt by the 1945 Cardinals, who will miss what would have been their fourth straight National League pennant by only three games.
- January 25 – Former general manager of the Cincinnati Reds and president of the Brooklyn Dodgers Larry MacPhail—currently a U.S. Army colonel working in the War Department in Washington, D.C.—heads a three-man group that buys 96.88 percent control of the New York Yankees from the estate of the late Col. Jacob Ruppert for $2.8 million. The innovative, dynamic MacPhail, 54, partners with New York businessman Dan Topping, 32, and Arizona-based construction magnate Del Webb, 45, in making the purchase. On February 10, after his discharge, MacPhail will take over from Ed Barrow, chief architect of the Yankee dynasty of 1921–1943, as president/GM, and in three short years, he will bring modern amenities and promotions (a stadium club, night baseball, "old-timers games") to Yankee Stadium—before he abruptly sells his share in the team after it wins its 11th World Series championship in 1947.

=== February ===
- February 10 – Slugger Jimmie Foxx, a cornerstone of Connie Mack's final dynasty, the Philadelphia Athletics of 1929–1931, returns to the city where he became a star, signing as a free agent with the Phillies of the National League. Foxx, 37, had spent 1944 as a player–coach with the Chicago Cubs, appearing in only 15 games.
- February 14 – On his 75th birthday, J. A. Robert Quinn, general manager of the Boston Braves since December 1935, turns over the job to his son, John, 36, the club's former treasurer and farm system director. The elder Quinn is also the former principal owner and president of the Braves, now operated by construction magnates Louis R. Perini, C. Joseph Maney and Guido Rugo — the "Three Little Steam Shovels."
- February 15 – United States Army Air Forces major and decorated bomber pilot Billy Southworth Jr., the son of the St. Louis Cardinals' manager and a former minor-league outfielder, dies at age 27 while leading flight training when his plane crashes into Flushing Bay in the Borough of Queens.
- February 21 – Wartime travel restrictions cancel the planned 1945 Major League Baseball All-Star Game and threaten a 1945 World Series. MLB teams are ordered to cut their travel miles by at least 25% and adjust their regular-season schedules. The Office of Defense Transportation in Washington shuts down horse racing, but spares the baseball season so far.
- February 24 – The Boston Braves purchase the contract of outfielder Carden Gillenwater from the Brooklyn Dodgers.

=== March ===
- March 6 – Harry O'Neill, first lieutenant, United States Marine Corps, and a former catcher who appeared in one game for the Philadelphia Athletics in 1939, is killed in the battle for Iwo Jima. He is 27.
- March 12 – Thomas E. Dewey, governor of New York, signs the Ives–Quinn Act into law. Described as "the most comprehensive ban on racial and religious [employment] discrimination in the United States," it will provide a basis for Branch Rickey, president of the Brooklyn Dodgers, to accelerate his secret plan to integrate the playing ranks of all-white "Organized Baseball".
- March 28 – The Dodgers sell the contract of former pitching staff ace Whit Wyatt to the Philadelphia Phillies. Right-hander Wyatt, 37, had his last outstanding season for the 1943 Dodgers. In 1941, he won 22 games and led National League pitchers in bWAR (6.7).
- March 31 – The Phillies acquire outfielder Vince DiMaggio from the Pittsburgh Pirates for southpaw hurler Al Gerheauser. Vince, 33, is the eldest of the three DiMaggio brothers.

=== April ===
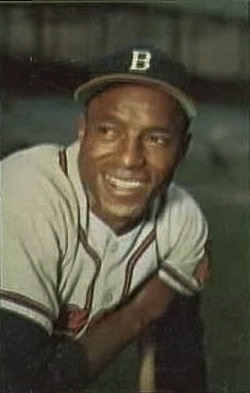
Sam Jethroe in 1953

- April 6 – Two veterans of the Negro leagues, pitcher Terris McDuffie, 34, and first baseman Dave "Showboat" Thomas, 40, partake in a special tryout for the Brooklyn Dodgers at the team's Bear Mountain, New York, training camp. The audition is forced upon the Dodgers by radical Harlem journalist Joe W. Bostic, who is one of the leading members of the Black press challenging the baseball color line. Though angered by Bostic's "ambush", Brooklyn president/general manager Branch Rickey reluctantly agrees to the tryout. He will sign neither player, and tells Bostic: "I'm more for your cause than anybody else you know, but you are making a mistake using force."
- April 16 – Under political pressure exerted by city councilor Isadore Muchnick, the Boston Red Sox agree to audition three Black players—Jackie Robinson of the Kansas City Monarchs, Sam Jethroe of the Cleveland Buckeyes, and Marvin Williams of the Philadelphia Stars—at Fenway Park. The arch-conservative Red Sox refuse to sign any of them. Reportedly, a Red Sox scout says of Robinson: "What a ballplayer! Too bad he's the wrong color."
- April 17 – Opening Day in Major League Baseball sees amputee Pete Gray make his debut with the defending American League champions, the St. Louis Browns. Gray, who lost his right arm to the elbow in a childhood accident, had hit a stellar .333 in the Class A1 Southern Association in 1944 while batting, catching and throwing only with his left arm and hand. He goes one-for-four, singling off Les Mueller, in a 7–1 victory over the Detroit Tigers at Sportsman's Park. He handles no chances in left field.
- April 19 – Two noteworthy injuries occur in today's 4–3 New York Yankees victory over the Boston Red Sox in the Bronx. In the third inning, New York left-fielder Hersh Martin is spiked in the nose by teammate Johnny Lindell when they collide trying to flag down a fly ball; Martin is hospitalized. Then, in the seventh, Joe Cronin, the Bosox' player–manager who's now his club's starting third baseman because of the wartime manpower shortage, breaks his leg while running the bases. The injury ends the future Hall of Famer's playing career at age 38 after 20 seasons.
- April 24 – Kentucky Senator Albert B. "Happy" Chandler is unanimously elected the second Commissioner of Baseball by the 16 MLB owners. He succeeds the late Kenesaw Mountain Landis, who died at 78 on November 25, 1944. Because of the ongoing world war, Chandler, 46, insists on remaining a member of the U.S. Senate to vote on key legislation stemming from developments such as the Bretton Woods economic summit and the Charter of the United Nations, which will overlap his first six months in office.
- April 25 – An "Old-Timers' Committee" elects ten turn-of-the-century figures to the National Baseball Hall of Fame and Museum. (See Awards and Honors, above.)
- April 28 – Hank Wyse of the Chicago Cubs one-hits the Pittsburgh Pirates at Wrigley Field. Bill Salkeld gets the lone Pirate safety. Wyse's 6–0 victory comes in the first of six National League one-hit complete games in 1945's regular season.
- April 29 – The Detroit Tigers reacquire outfielder Roy Cullenbine, obtaining him from the Cleveland Indians in exchange for infielders "Little Dutch" Meyer and Don Ross. Cullenbine, 31, broke into the majors with Detroit in 1938, and this season he'll help spark a Tiger pennant and World Series title as the club's everyday right-fielder.

=== May ===
- May 1 – Joe Haynes of the visiting Chicago White Sox one-hits the Detroit Tigers; the only safety and baserunner he allows is Skeeter Webb's third-inning single. Haynes' effort is the first of six complete game one-hitters to be recorded in the American League in 1945. Their 6–2 win is the ChiSox' sixth in their first eight games of 1945.
- May 3 – The New York Yankees release outfielder Paul Waner after just one game. The future Hall of Famer had come out of retirement the previous season due to the shortage of players caused by World War II.
- May 6 – The Kansas City Monarchs' season begins with a home contest against the Chicago American Giants. Their rookie shortstop, Jackie Robinson, will bat .375 in 34 games, leading the Negro American League in doubles (13) and home runs (four).
- May 8 – Victory in Europe Day marks the unconditional surrender of Nazi Germany to the Allies of World War II. However, the conflict in the Pacific continues.
- May 17 – For the fourth time in four days, every American League game is postponed due to rain.
- May 21 – The Brooklyn Dodgers release manager Leo Durocher from his playing contract. Durocher, 39, has appeared in only 88 games since 1939, his maiden season at the Dodger helm. This season has seen the three-time NL All-Star shortstop play in only two contests, both as a second baseman, on April 17–18. Durocher's 17-year MLB playing career ends after 1,637 games.
- May 23 – The Boston Braves and St. Louis Cardinals exchange right-handed pitchers, with Boston sending Red Barrett and $60,000 to St. Louis for Mort Cooper. Barrett, 30, is 2–3 (4.74) so far in 1945; he'll win 21 of 30 decisions, with a sparkling 2.74 earned run average, as a Cardinal through the end of the year. Cooper, 32 and coming off three straight standout years—a composite record of 65–22 (2.17)—for the two-time World Series and 3x NL champion Redbirds, has been embroiled in a salary dispute with owner Sam Breadon and serious elbow miseries lie ahead.

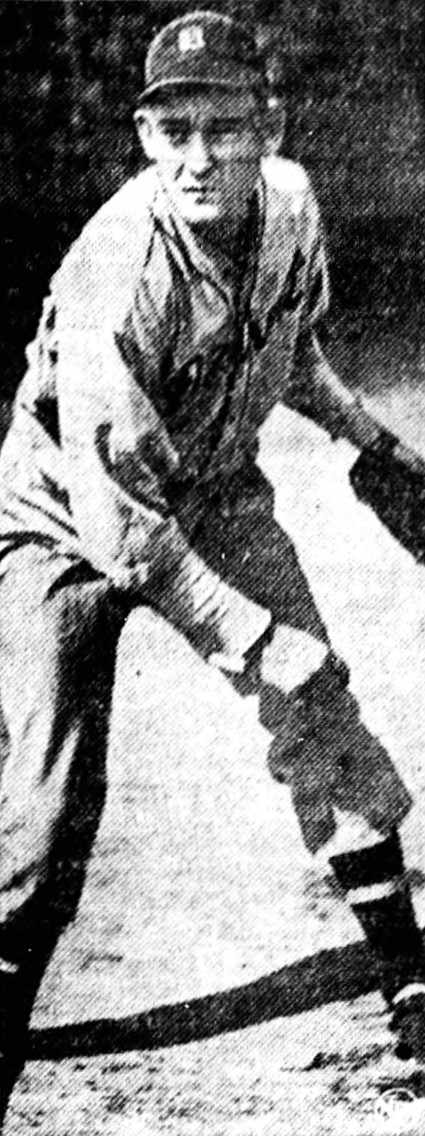
Al Benton

- May 24:
  - A start-up Negro leagues team, the Brooklyn Brown Dodgers, debuts in the brand-new United States League by dropping a 3–2 decision to Philadelphia at Ebbets Field. The team and the circuit itself are heavily backed by Branch Rickey of the NL Dodgers. Rickey will use the Brown Dodgers as camouflage in his secret mission to break the color barrier in "Organized Baseball"—enabling his scouts to evaluate and identify Black players as candidates to integrate his organization.
  - Al Benton of the Detroit Tigers surrenders a run in the third inning of his start today against the Philadelphia Athletics at Shibe Park, ending his three-week-long consecutive-games scoreless innings streak at 33, longest in 1945 for any MLB hurler.
- May 25 – In the Boston Red Sox' 5–0 home loss to the St. Louis Browns, outfielder Leon Culberson makes an unassisted double play, racing in from center field to catch a short fly ball, then running to second and stepping on the bag to double up the Browns' Vern Stephens.
- May 26 – The New York Giants improve their 1945 record to 25–7–1 with a 5–1 victory over the Cincinnati Reds at Crosley Field. They lead the Senior Circuit by 6½ games over the Brooklyn Dodgers. The Giants, however, will end up in fifth place, 19 games behind, when the season ends.
- May 29 – The Cleveland Indians acquire iron-man catcher Frankie Hayes from the Philadelphia Athletics for fellow receiver Buddy Rosar. Hayes has started 191 straight games behind the plate since October 2, 1943. His consecutive-games-started-at-catcher streak will reach 312 before ending in April 1946.
- May 31 – The Philadelphia Phillies pick up pitcher Oscar Judd on waivers from the Boston Red Sox.

=== June ===
- June 2 – The Cincinnati Reds release veteran right-hander Guy Bush, 43. After spending 1939 to 1943 out of baseball, he had returned to the game due to the World War II manpower shortage. The "Mississippi Mudcat" retires with 176 MLB victories, 152 of them during his 1923–1934 tenure as a Chicago Cub.
- June 3 – The St. Louis Browns and Philadelphia Athletics play to a 13-inning, scoreless tie at Shibe Park before a Sunday-evening curfew halts the game at 7 p.m. The Browns' Tex Shirley throws 13 shutout innings. The statistics will count, but the game will be replayed later in 1945. It's one of MLB's 12 tie games to be played this season—eight of them in the American League.
- June 14 – The Brooklyn Dodgers release catcher–coach Clyde Sukeforth, 43, from his playing contract. Sukeforth will soon be part of a platoon of Brooklyn scouts canvassing the Negro leagues for playing talent.
- June 15:
  - Hard-nosed former outfielder Ben Chapman, now a part-time pitcher, is traded to the Philadelphia Phillies by the Dodgers for catcher Johnny Peacock.
  - The Boston Red Sox sign 1941 NL MVP first baseman Dolph Camilli, 38, as a free agent; he had been playing for Oakland of the Pacific Coast League.
  - The Philadelphia Athletics formally release Hall-of-Fame slugger Al Simmons from his playing contract. Simmons, now 43, has been listed on the active roster, even though he hasn't appeared in a game since July 1, 1944. He remains on Connie Mack's coaching staff.
- June 16 – The Boston Braves acquire outfielder (and future Hall of Famer) Joe Medwick, 33, along with left-hander Ewald Pyle, from the New York Giants for catcher Clyde Kluttz.
- June 24 – The Pittsburgh Pirates sign pitcher Walter "Boom-Boom" Beck, 40, released by the Cincinnati Reds on June 22. Twelve-year veteran Beck will enjoy an effective tenure with the Bucs, going 6–1 (2.14) in 14 games before beginning a career as a minor-league manager, MLB scout, and pitching coach.
- June 29 – The Philadelphia Phillies, who have lost 51 of their first 68 National League games in 1945, replace manager Freddie Fitzsimmons with playing skipper Ben Chapman, acquired only two weeks ago from Brooklyn. Known for his bellicosity and ill temper, Chapman, 36, will lead the Phils to only 29 more wins this season (they'll finish 46–108 and 52 games out of first place), but he'll hold on to his managerial job into July 1948—a tenure that includes his now-infamous first encounter with Jackie Robinson in April 1947.

=== July ===
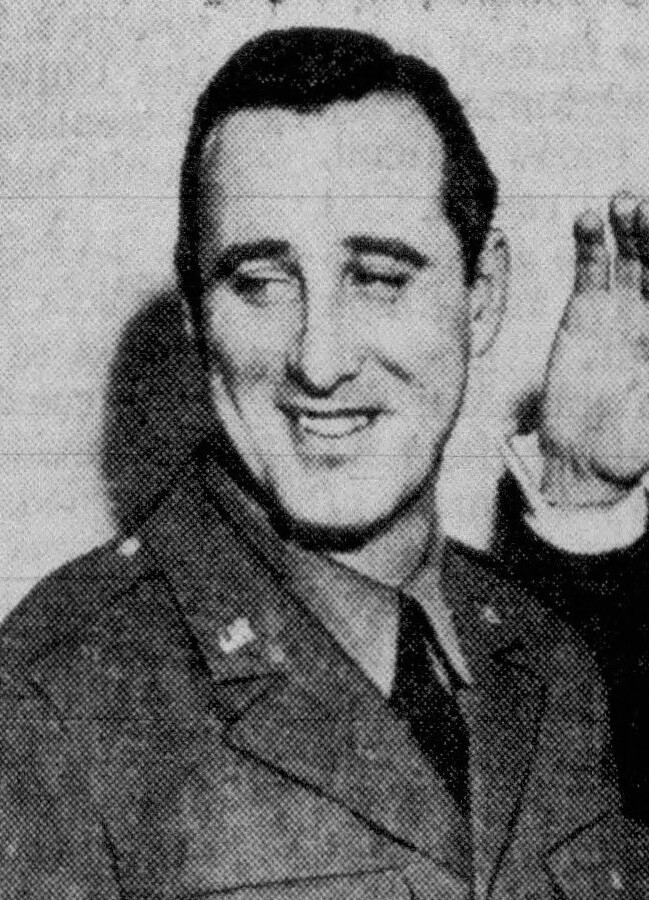
Hank Greenberg during his U.S. Army service

- July 1 – The Detroit Tigers' future Hall of Famer Hank Greenberg—one of the first players to register for the peacetime draft—makes a dramatic return to the major leagues after an absence of 47 months. Before 47,729 fans at Briggs Stadium, the former USAAF captain walks and homers to help Detroit overcome a 5–2 deficit and defeat the Philadelphia Athletics 9–5. The home run is the 250th of Greenberg's career. He had last appeared in a big-league game on May 6, 1941.
- July 3 – Stan Hack, Phil Cavarretta and Don Johnson of the Chicago Cubs each score five runs apiece, tying a major league record, as the Cubs humiliate the Boston Braves, 24–2, at Braves Field. Chicago's 28 hits and 24 runs are the most for any MLB team this season.
- July 4 – Augie Bergamo of the St. Louis Cardinals gets eight hits in a doubleheader versus the New York Giants. In the nightcap alone, Bergamo goes five for six and drives in eight runs on three singles, a two run homer, and a grand slam. In all, Bergamo has 16 total bases on the day as the Cardinals sweep the Giants.
- July 5 – Whitey Lockman of the Giants homers in his first major league at bat, victimizing Cardinals pitcher George Dockins, but the Giants end up losing 7–5 at the Polo Grounds.
- July 6:
  - Tommy Holmes of the Boston Braves passes Rogers Hornsby in hitting in his 34th consecutive game. Hornsby's National League record had stood since 1922. Holmes' record, which eventually reaches 37, will stand until 1978 when it's broken by Pete Rose of the Cincinnati Reds.
  - The Mexican Pacific League, also known as the Liga Invernal de Sonora and the Mexican Winter League, is founded by Teodoro Mariscal and four others, and will begin play October 27 with four teams based in Culiacán, Guaymas, Hermosillo and Mazatlán.
- July 8:
  - The Chicago Cubs, in the midst of a torrid midsummer stretch, take over the National League lead by sweeping the Philadelphia Phillies in a Shibe Park doubleheader, while the erstwhile leaders, the Brooklyn Dodgers, are swept by the St. Louis Cardinals at Ebbets Field. Chicago will win 26 of its 32 July games.
  - In the American League, the first-place Detroit Tigers split a twin bill with the New York Yankees at Briggs Stadium, maintaining a 4½-game edge over the second-place Bombers and Washington Senators.
- July 10 – With the 1945 All-Star Game ruled out because of travel restrictions, MLB teams play seven exhibition games featuring an AL vs. NL format. Teams from St. Louis, Chicago, Philadelphia, New York and Boston play each other, while Cleveland faces Cincinnati and Washington takes on Brooklyn. A scheduled Detroit vs. Pittsburgh match is cancelled.
- July 13 – Pat Seerey of the Cleveland Indians goes four-for-six with three home runs and a triple, scores four times, racks up 15 total bases, and drives in eight runs in a 16–4 beatdown of the New York Yankees in the Bronx.
- July 21 – At Shibe Park, the Detroit Tigers and Philadelphia Athletics battle for 24 innings, ending the game tied at one. Tigers starter Les Mueller pitches 192/3 innings, while his Philadelphia counterpart, Russ Christopher, goes 13 frames.
- July 22 – Joe McCarthy, the Hall-of-Fame manager of the New York Yankees, begins a 20-day leave to battle health problems, later reported to be related to alcoholism. His team (currently only 42–38 and in third place) is turned over to veteran coach Art Fletcher. McCarthy will return to the helm on August 10.
- July 26 – Outfielder Jake Powell, once part of four World Series-champion Yankees teams (1936–1939), is sold by the Washington Senators on waivers to the Philadelphia Phillies. Powell, 36, is in his 11th and last MLB season, his career prolonged by the wartime manpower shortage.
- July 27 – In a more significant and controversial waiver deal, Yankees president/general manager Larry MacPhail sells the contract of right-handed starting pitcher Hank Borowy to the National League-leading Chicago Cubs for a reported $97,000. Borowy, 29, is 10–5 (3.13) with seven complete games in 18 starts as a Yankee. The 55–32 Cubs today lead the NL by 4½ games; Borowy will help them seal their 16th pennant (since 1876) by going 11–2 (2.13) with 11 complete games (and one save), then hurl a shutout in Game 1 of the 1945 World Series.
- July 29 – The Boston Braves, who've gone 11–20 during July and sunk into seventh place in the National League, sack manager Bob Coleman and name coach Del Bissonette interim bench boss.

=== August ===
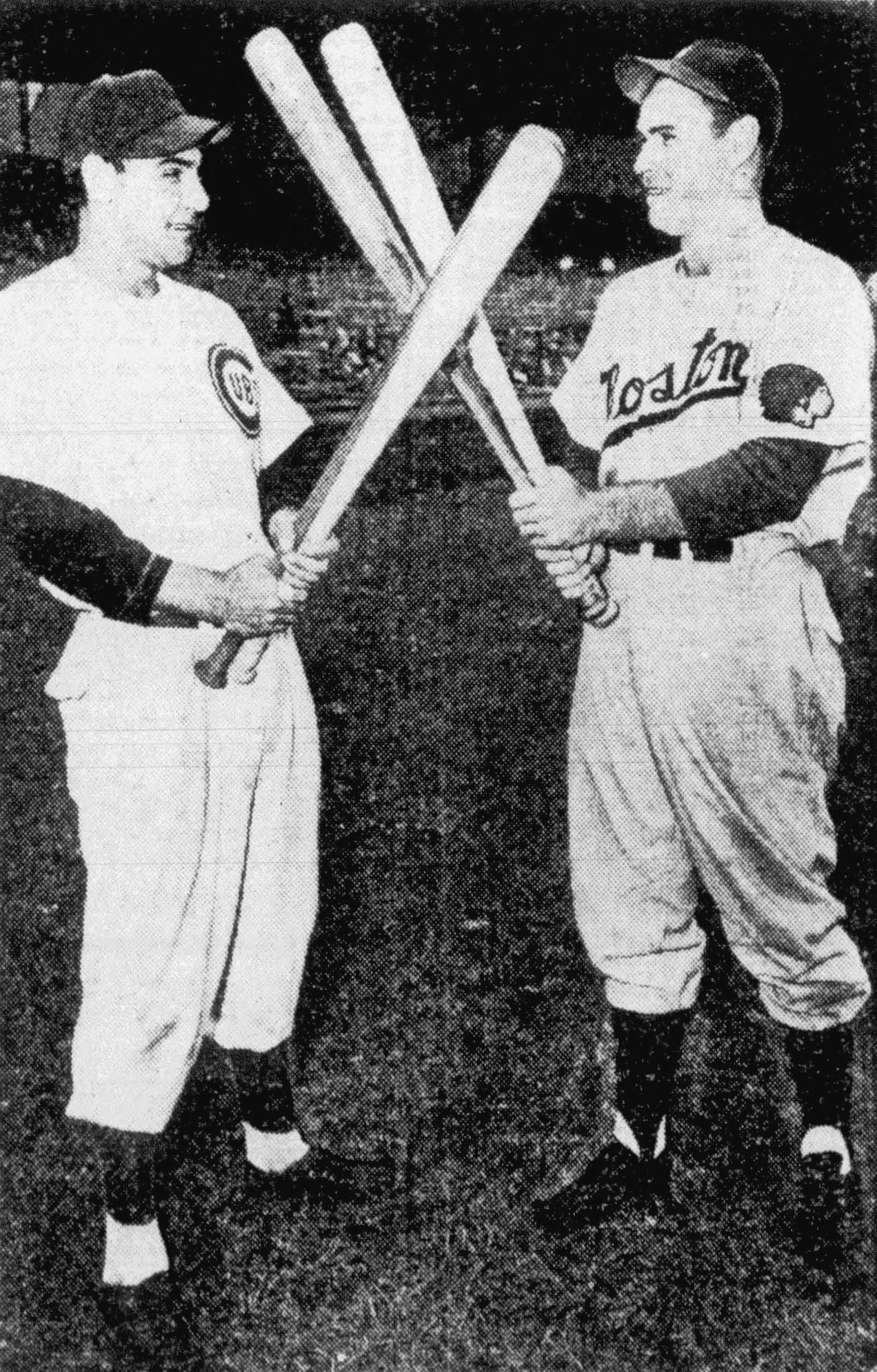
The Cubs' Phil Cavarretta and Braves' Tommy Holmes; they will finish 1–2 in 1945's NL MVP voting

- August 1 – Mel Ott, the 36-year-old player–manager of the New York Giants, hits the 500th home run of his career; no National League player has hit more.
- August 4:
  - At Griffith Stadium, amputee and World War II former Prisoner of War Bert Shepard, a minor-league pitcher who lost the lower part of his right leg after his fighter plane was shot down over Nazi Germany on May 21, 1944, appears in an American League game for the Washington Senators. Entering a lopsided contest with Washington trailing the Boston Red Sox 14–2 with two out in the fourth inning, Shepard goes 51/3 frames to finish the game, permits only three hits and one earned run, and strikes out two. It's his only MLB appearance, and marks the first and only time a player with a prosthetic leg plays in a big-league game. Also in this game:
    - The Red Sox' Tom McBride ties a major-league record with six RBI in the fourth inning.
    - Senators pitcher Joe Cleary becomes the last native of Ireland as of 2024 to appear in a major league game.
  - Catcher Bill Salkeld of the Pittsburgh Pirates hits for the cycle and drives in all of Pittsburgh's runs in their 6–5 loss to the St. Louis Cardinals. He's the second Buc to hit for the cycle in 1945: Bob Elliott had accomplished the feat in a 15–3 thrashing of the Brooklyn Dodgers on July 15.
- August 5:
  - Seeking to compress their 154-game schedule into as few dates as possible due to wartime travel cuts, the Senators play a doubleheader for the fifth consecutive day. Remarkably, between August 1 and today, the Senators win nine out of the ten games they play, including today's sweep of the Red Sox at Griffith Stadium. During the 1945 season, Washington will appear in 44 doubleheaders.
  - Chicago Cubs first baseman Phil Cavarretta racks up his second five-hit and third five-RBI game of 1945, leading a 22-hit attack in a 12–5 triumph over the Cincinnati Reds in the opener of a Crosley Field double-header. The Cubs sweep the twin bill and widen their NL lead to six games over the St. Louis Cardinals.
- August 12 – Right-hander Jim Tobin, acquired by the first-place Detroit Tigers from the Boston Braves three days earlier for the pennant drive, makes a memorable AL debut at Briggs Stadium. Tobin, a knuckleballer who's also one of the best-hitting pitchers of his era, throws three shutout innings in relief against the New York Yankees, then blasts a game-winning, three-run homer in the 11th off Jim "Milkman" Turner to deliver a 9–6 Tiger win.
- August 13 – Ownership of the Brooklyn Dodgers, in turmoil since the 1925 death of Charles Ebbets, is resolved when existing investors Branch Rickey and Walter O'Malley each increase their holdings from 8.3% to 25% and pharmaceutical magnate John L. Smith also purchases one-quarter of the club from the Brooklyn Trust Company, the Ebbets estate, and former investor Andrew Schmitz. Brooklyn Trust until late 1944 had been managing 75% of the team's stock on behalf of Ebbets' and Edward McKeever's heirs. The revamped ownership becomes a four-member partnership, with the remaining 25% controlled by Dearie Mulvey, daughter of the late Stephen McKeever, who acquired his stake in 1912. The arrangement seemingly leaves the Dodgers firmly in the control of Rickey, who is also president and general manager; however, O'Malley, a New York attorney, will soon mount a successful, five-year campaign to oust Rickey and take over the franchise himself.
- August 19 – In his final major league season, Philadelphia Phillies outfielder and future Hall of Famer Jimmie Foxx, 37, takes the mound as starting pitcher at Shibe Park. Foxx hurls 62/3 innings and gives up just four hits, as the Phillies defeat the Cincinnati Reds 4–2. Foxx, author of 534 career homers (second at this time to Babe Ruth), makes nine pitching appearances for the 1945 Phils, and goes 1–0 (1.59) in 222/3 innings pitched.
- August 28:
  - At the Dodgers' business office in Brooklyn Heights, Branch Rickey and 26-year-old Kansas City Monarchs shortstop Jackie Robinson meet for the first time. Robinson had been escorted by Dodger coach/scout Clyde Sukeforth to Brooklyn under the guise of playing for the "Brown Dodgers"—a team founded by Rickey to compete in the United States League, a start-up Negro leagues circuit. However, Rickey stuns Robinson by revealing his so-far secret intention to racially integrate the playing ranks of all-white "Organized Baseball"—with Robinson as the pioneering Black athlete who will shoulder the burden. After Rickey demonstrates the on- and off-field abuse that likely lies ahead, Robinson accepts the challenge: he signs a secret memorandum of agreement promising him a contract with the Montreal Royals of the International League, one of Brooklyn's two highest-level farm clubs.
  - Seventeen-year-old Tommy Brown of the Dodgers triples off René Monteagudo of the Philadelphia Phillies, then takes advantage of Monteagudo's wind-up to steal home. Brown is the youngest player in major league history to steal home plate. The Dodgers defeat the Phillies 7–1.

=== September ===
Vince DiMaggio

- September 1:
  - Sig Jakucki, the hard-drinking, hot-tempered St. Louis Browns right-hander, arrives drunk at Union Station as his third-place team, only 3½ games behind the first-place Detroit Tigers, prepares to depart for a grueling, 23-day, 26-game road trip to the seven other American League cities. Furious, manager Luke Sewell promptly kicks Jakucki off the team. A brawl between pitcher and manager is barely averted, but Jakucki's season—he was 12–10 (3.51) with 15 complete games in 24 starts—and big-league career are over. The Browns will go 14–12 on the trip to finish third.
  - Vince DiMaggio of the Philadelphia Phillies ties a major-league mark with his fourth grand slam of the season. The Phillies defeat the Boston Braves, 8–3.
- September 2 – Japan formally signs an instrument of unconditional surrender, signaling the end of World War II's final theater of combat. Two million U.S. military personnel will be discharged from service in the coming months, with many professional baseball players seeking to return to the game.
- September 3:
  - During today's Labor Day doubleheaders, the Chicago Cubs (79–47) sweep the Cincinnati Reds, to double their National League lead (now four games) over the second-place St. Louis Cardinals (76–52), who drop a pair to the Pittsburgh Pirates. In the American League, the front-running Detroit Tigers (72–54), who sweep the Chicago White Sox, also pick up ground on their closest pursuers, the Washington Senators (72–58), who split with the Boston Red Sox. The Tigers lead the AL by two full lengths.
  - For the second time in 1945, the Boston Braves and Brooklyn Dodgers engage in fisticuffs; both incidents involve fiery Dodger second baseman Eddie Stanky. In the second game of today's twin bill, Stanky's hard tag to the head of Boston's Dick Culler precipitates a bench-clearing brawl in the tenth inning of a 4–3 Brooklyn triumph at Ebbets Field. Both principal combatants are ejected. Earlier this year, on June 23 at Brooklyn, the Dodgers' Dixie Walker—incensed when Braves' pitcher Ewald Pyle tried to trip Stanky as he scored a run—left the on-deck circle to punch Pyle in retaliation. Walker and Pyle were promptly ousted from that contest, a 14–12 Dodger victory. Coincidentally, the same umpire, Ziggy Sears, throws the four players out of the two games.
- September 7 – Joe Kuhel of the Washington Senators legs out an inside-the-park home run to give the home team a 3–0 lead in the third inning of a game against the St. Louis Browns. Kuhel's blow is the only four-bagger the Senators will hit at their cavernous ballpark, Griffith Stadium, in 78 games and 2,601 at bats all season. More importantly, it provides the winning margin when Washington hangs on to defeat the St. Louis Browns, 3–2, and remain 1½ games behind the Detroit Tigers in the American League.
- September 8 – The following day, U.S. President Harry Truman, sworn into office on April 12 after the death of Franklin Roosevelt, becomes the first left-hander and, at 61, the oldest President to ever throw out a ceremonial pitch. Home-team Washington defeats Truman's home-state St. Louis Browns, 4–1, to again keep pace with Detroit.
- September 9:
  - Cleveland Indians first baseman Mickey Rocco leads the way to a doubleheader sweep of the New York Yankees with two home runs, two doubles, and two singles. A crowd of 72,252 is on hand at Yankee Stadium to see their team lose, 10–3 and 4–3.
  - In the second game of a doubleheader, Dick Fowler pitches a no-hitter as the Philadelphia Athletics defeat the visiting St. Louis Browns, 1–0. Fowler walks four and fans six. The game's scoreless into the bottom of the ninth; then Hal Peck triples and Irv Hall singles Peck home to seal the win.
- September 12 – The last-place Athletics deal the league-leading Detroit Tigers a 16-inning setback at Shibe Park, 3–2. Charlie Gassaway (12 innings, two runs allowed) and Don Black (four shutout frames) hold down the Bengals, whose AL lead is back to 1½ lengths.
- September 13 – The Cincinnati Reds defeat the visiting New York Giants 3–2 on a weekday afternoon before only 281 fans, the smallest crowd ever to see a game at Crosley Field.
- September 20 – At Shibe Park, the Cleveland Buckeyes shut out the two-time defending champion Homestead Grays, 5–0 behind Frank Carswell's four-hitter, to sweep the 1945 Negro World Series in four straight games.
- September 23 – Although a week remains in the American League season, the second-place Washington Senators' full schedule ends today with a doubleheader split with the Philadelphia Athletics. Washington (87–67–2) is still mathematically alive, although trailing the first-place Detroit Tigers (86–64–2), who have four contests left to play. The idle Senators can still win the pennant if Detroit loses its four remaining games, or force a tie-breaker if the Tigers go 1–3. The Senators' home schedule had ended on September 18 because Griffith Stadium is being converted to football to house its college and NFL tenants.
- September 29 – The Chicago Cubs (now 97–56–1) sew up their first National League pennant since 1938, sweeping the Pittsburgh Pirates in a doubleheader at Forbes Field. In the nightcap, Chicago catcher Paul Gillespie, who slugged a home run in his debut MLB at bat on September 11, 1942, homers in his final plate appearance, ultimately becoming the first player to hit a homer in his first and last MLB regular-season at bats. (John Miller will be the second, in 1966 and 1969.) Gillespie, 25, goes on to play in the 1945 World Series and goes hitless in six Fall Classic at-bats, then is sent down to the minor leagues in 1946.
- September 30 – After three consecutive rain-outs in St. Louis, the Detroit Tigers (now 87–65–2) still need a victory on closing day to clinch their first American League flag since 1940. In Game 1 of a scheduled doubleheader against the Browns at Sportsman's Park, Detroit trails 3–2 going into the top of the ninth. Then, with the bases loaded and one out, the Tigers' Hank Greenberg belts a grand slam home run off Nels Potter to deliver a 6–3 win, and an AL pennant. The second game of the twin bill is then rained out. Their elimination ends the Washington Senators' excruciating waiting game; the runner-up's AL season had concluded seven days before.

=== October ===
Hank Borowy (right) with Charlie Grimm

- October 2 – The first off-season transaction sees the Cleveland Indians purchase the contract of pitcher Don Black from the Philadelphia Athletics.
- October 3 – The 1945 World Series opens at Briggs Stadium, Detroit. With wartime travel restrictions still in place, the Fall Classic will not follow its usual 2–3–2 home/away format; instead, Games 1–3 will take place in Detroit, and Games 4 and 5–7 (if necessary) will be played in Chicago. In Game 1, former American Leaguer Hank Borowy tames the Tigers on six hits and the Cubs take the Series lead with a 9–0 shutout.
- October 5 – In Game 3 of the World Series at Detroit, Claude Passeau of the Chicago Cubs allows only a second-inning single to the Detroit Tigers' Rudy York, firing the second one-hitter in the 42-year history of the Fall Classic. With their 3–0 triumph, the Cubs take a 2–1 Series lead as they head home for the event's remaining games.
- October 6 – Attempting to promote his Chicago pub, the Billy Goat Tavern, William Sianis purchases a ticket to Game 4 of the 1945 World Series, then attempts to bring his billy goat, "Murphy," into Wrigley Field. When the ushers turn the two away, Sianis is so angered that he vows that the Chicago Cubs will never win another pennant or World Series; his "Curse of the Billy Goat" becomes part of the Cubs' forklore—until it's finally dispelled in 2016.
- October 10 – Light-hitting catcher Paul Richards, the future MLB manager and executive, drives in four runs with two doubles and Hall of Famer Hal Newhouser throws a complete game, as the visiting Detroit Tigers defeat the Chicago Cubs, 9–3, in Game 7 of the World Series to win their second world championship, and first since 1935.
- October 16 – The St. Louis Browns trade five-time AL All-Star first baseman George McQuinn to the Philadelphia Athletics for fellow first-sacker Dick Siebert. When the Browns attempt to cut Siebert's $12,000 salary to $10,000, he retires from the majors and goes into coaching—where he'll soon become renowned as the mentor of the Minnesota Golden Gophers baseball team between 1948 and 1978.
- October 23 – The late-August secret accord reached between Jackie Robinson and Branch Rickey comes to fruition when, before surprised press and photographers in Montréal, Robinson signs a contract to play for the Royals, one of the Brooklyn Dodgers' top two minor-league affiliates. The terms: a $600 monthly salary and a bonus of $3,500, if he makes the 1946 Royals' roster out of spring training. Robinson is poised to become the first acknowledged Black player in "Organized Baseball" since 1884. The Dodgers are "not inviting trouble," says farm system boss Branch Rickey Jr. today, "but [we] won't avoid it if it comes."

=== November ===
- November 1 – George Trautman, 55, becomes general manager of the recently crowned World Series-champion Detroit Tigers. Trautman is a veteran minor-league executive who has been president of the American Association since 1935. He succeeds Jack Zeller, who has been the Tigers' GM since 1938.
- November 3:
  - Two days after recently installed Commissioner of Baseball Happy Chandler formally resigns his United States Senate seat, Leslie O'Connor departs the Commissioner's office to become the new vice president and general manager of the Chicago White Sox. O'Connor, 56, was the longtime assistant to the late Kenesaw Mountain Landis and served as chair of the Major League Advisory Council during the five-month period when the commissionership was vacant after Landis' November 1944 death.
  - To replace O'Connor, Chandler appoints Herold "Muddy" Ruel his chief aide. Ruel, 49, has a unique background: he was a catcher who played in nearly 1,500 games for 19 years and six American League clubs, then a coach for the White Sox for 11 more; but he's also a lawyer who in 1929 was admitted to the bar association of the U.S. Supreme Court.
  - Chandler moves the Commissioner's office from Chicago, its original home, to Cincinnati, located just across the Ohio River from Chandler's native state of Kentucky.
- November 7:
  - Billy Southworth, 52, who has led the St. Louis Cardinals to a brilliant 577–301 record, a winning percentage of .657, three National League pennants and two World Series titles (1942, 1944) since becoming their manager on June 14, 1940, is released from the final year of his contract to sign a three-year pact as skipper of the Boston Braves. The deal, reported to be worth a lucrative $30,000 annually (over $535,000 in 2025 dollars), is the work of Lou Perini, construction magnate and the Braves' aggressive new majority owner. In 2008, Southworth will be elected posthumously to the Hall of Fame to recognize his managerial career.
  - Sam Breadon, the Cardinals' owner who gives his blessing to Southworth's departure, hires former Redbird pitcher and longtime farm-system manager and administrator Eddie Dyer, 46, as his varsity's new pilot.
- November 25 – A team of Negro leagues all-stars, including Jackie Robinson and Roy Campanella, travel to Venezuela for the Serie Monumental, where they will play several Venezuelan all-star teams.

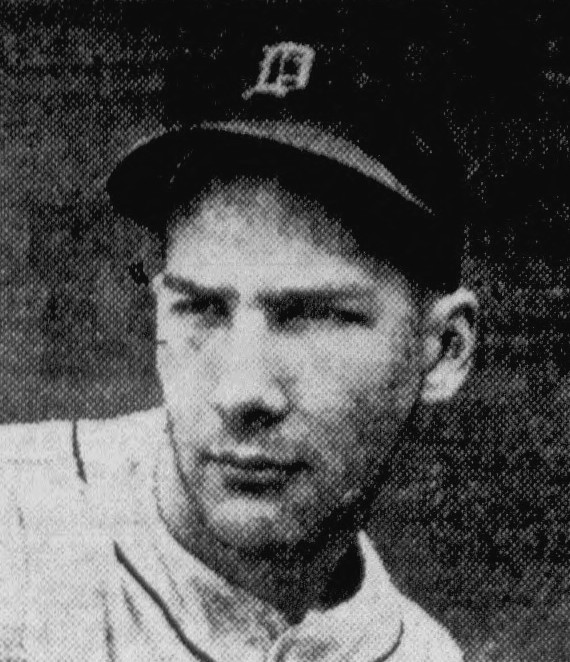
Hal Newhouser in 1946

- November 28 – With nine first-place votes and 236 points, left-handed hurler Hal Newhouser of the Detroit Tigers wins his second consecutive AL MVP Award. His teammate Eddie Mayo finishes second. Newhouser, a future Hall of Famer (elected 1992), led his league in bWAR (12.2) and bWAR for pitchers (11.3), victories (25), earned run average (1.81), strikeouts (212), innings pitched (3131/3), complete games (29) and shutouts (eight).
  - The National League MVP for 1945 is Chicago Cubs first baseman Phil Cavarretta, who led the NL in batting average (.355) and on-base percentage (.449). Cavarretta (15 first-place nods, 279 points) easily outpaces the runner-up in the balloting, Tommy Holmes of the Boston Braves.

=== December ===
- December 4 – The eight Pacific Coast League team owners vote unanimously to become the third major league in "Organized Baseball." However, the 16 owners of American and National League clubs are reported to "take a dim view" of the PCL's gambit and will reject it, also unanimously, on December 11.
- December 8 – Veteran infielder Tony Cuccinello draws his unconditional release from the Chicago White Sox. Cuccinello, 38, finished an excruciatingly close second to Snuffy Stirnweiss in the contest for the 1945 American League batting title. With younger military veterans about to enter or re-enter baseball, Cuccinello's release—which ends his big-league playing career—sends a strong signal that the World War II manpower shortage is over.
- December 10 – The Cincinnati Reds send seven-time National League All-Star first baseman Frank McCormick, 34, to the Philadelphia Phillies for a $30,000 cash payment.
- December 12 – The Boston Red Sox sell the contract of infielder Skeeter Newsome to the Phillies and reacquire pitcher Jim Bagby Jr. from the Cleveland Indians for hurler Vic Johnson and cash. Bagby, 29, broke in with the Red Sox from 1938–1940, but made two wartime AL All-Star teams during his five years in Cleveland.
- December 14 – The Indians trade Jeff Heath, whose 15 homers led his team in 1945, to the Washington Senators for fellow 30-year-old outfielder George Case, a speedster and five-time AL leader in stolen bases, most recently in 1943.
- December 22 – Connie Mack, baseball's 83-year-old "Grand Old Man," issues his annual birthday prediction. "Babe Ruth's great home run record won't last," he tells an audience in St. Petersburg, Florida, "nor will the other heroic marks still be standing in the year 2000." The reason, he says: "The players will always get better."

== Births ==
=== January ===
- January 3 – Larry Barnett
- January 7 – Tony Conigliaro
- January 8 – Jesús Hernáiz
- January 12:
  - Paul Gilliford
  - Bob Reed
- January 18:
  - Tom Harrison
  - Rich Severson
- January 20 – Dave Boswell
- January 22 – Jophery Brown
- January 25 – Wally Bunker
- January 29 – Dick Mills

=== February ===
- February 9 – Jim Nash
- February 11 – John Paciorek
- February 12 – Don Wilson
- February 14 – Bob Terlecki
- February 15 – Ross Moschitto
- February 21 – Tom Shopay
- February 24 – Gary Moore
- February 26 – Steve Hertz

=== March ===
- March 1 – Jim Panther
- March 5 – Dave Bakenhaster
- March 11 – Dock Ellis
- March 12:
  - Don O'Riley
  - Horacio Piña
- March 25 – Jim Ellis
- March 30 – Dick Woodson

=== April ===
- April 2:
  - Mike Kekich
  - Reggie Smith
  - Don Sutton
- April 4 – Nick Bremigan
- April 9 – Jerry Hinsley
- April 11 – Mike Kilkenny
- April 15 – Ted Sizemore
- April 17 – Dennis Paepke
- April 18 – Mike Paul
- April 19 – Tommy Gramly
- April 23 – Jorge Rubio
- April 30 – Ray Miller

=== May ===
- May 3 – Davey Lopes
- May 4 – Rene Lachemann
- May 5 – Jimmy Rosario
- May 25 – Bill Dillman
- May 26 – Al Yates
- May 29:
  - Clyde Mashore
  - Blue Moon Odom

=== June ===
- June 5 – Chip Coulter
- June 6 – Larry Howard
- June 7 – George Mitterwald
- June 12 – Gary Jones
- June 20 – Ray Newman
- June 25 – Dick Drago
- June 30:
  - Jerry Kenney
  - Otis Thornton

=== July ===
- July 1 – Billy Rohr
- July 2 – Ron Slocum
- July 7:
  - Chuck Goggin
  - Bill Melton
- July 8 – Jim Ollom
- July 10 – Hal McRae
- July 17 – Greg Riddoch
- July 29 – Roy Foster

=== August ===
- August 4 – Mike Davison
- August 6 – Andy Messersmith
- August 15:
  - Duffy Dyer
  - Bobby Treviño
- August 16 – Jan Dukes
- August 21 – Jerry DaVanon
- August 30 – Tommy Dean

=== September ===
- September 8 – Ossie Blanco
- September 13 – Rick Wise
- September 14 – Curtis Brown
- September 16:
  - Bob Chlupsa
  - Ed Sprague
  - Héctor Torres
- September 20 – Mike Jurewicz
- September 25:
  - Steve Arlin
  - Bill Hepler
- September 26 – Dave Duncan
- September 28 – Gene Ratliff

=== October ===
- October 1 – Rod Carew
- October 4 – John Duffie
- October 7 – Dick Bates
- October 11 – Bob Stinson
- October 12 – Herman Hill
- October 14 – Tom Silverio
- October 15 – Jim Palmer
- October 17 – Bob Christian
- October 18 – Don Young
- October 19:
  - Al Gallagher
  - Gary Taylor
- October 27 – Mike Lum
- October 30 – Roe Skidmore

=== November ===
- November 1 – Bobby Brooks
- November 3 – Ken Holtzman
- November 3 – Jim Johnson
- November 7 – Dave Bennett
- November 10 – Bill Southworth
- November 12 – Rafael Batista
- November 17 – Bill Harrelson
- November 19 – Bobby Tolan
- November 20:
  - Jay Johnstone
  - Rick Monday
  - John Sanders
- November 22 – Denny Riddleberger
- November 25 – Wayne Redmond

=== December ===
- December 3:
  - Steve Huntz
  - Lou Marone
- December 6:
  - Larry Bowa
  - Jay Dahl
- December 12 – Ralph Garr
- December 14 – Greg Goossen
- December 15 – Gil Blanco
- December 19:
  - Art Kusnyer
  - Geoff Zahn
- December 20:
  - Vince Colbert
  - Keith Lampard
- December 30 – Tom Murphy

== Deaths ==
=== January ===
- January 3 – George Stone, 68, left fielder who played all but two of his 848 MLB games for the St. Louis Browns from 1905 to 1910; led the American League in his 1905 rookie season with 187 hits, then topped the league in 1906 with a .358 batting average, total bases (291), on-base percentage (.417) and slugging percentage (.501), while finishing second in hits (208) and triples (20), third in RBI (71), and seventh in home runs (6).
- January 5 – Bill Hobbs, shortstop who played with the Cincinnati Reds during the 1913 and 1916 seasons.
- January 8 – Dean Thomas, 31, right-handed pitcher for the 1937 Detroit Stars and 1944 Kansas City Monarchs of the Negro American League.
- January 11 – Harry McNeal, 67, pitcher for the 1901 Cleveland Bluebirds of the American League.
- January 14 – Ted Blankenship, 43, hard-throwing pitcher who played from 1922 through 1930 for the Chicago White Sox.
- January 17:
  - Roy Radebaugh, 63, pitcher for the St. Louis Cardinals in the 1911 season.
  - Rube Ward, 65, backup outfielder for the 1902 Brooklyn Superbas of the National League.
- January 18:
  - Mike Fitzgerald, 53, outfielder who played for the New York Highlanders in 1911 and the Philadelphia Phillies in 1918.
  - Gene Lansing, 47, pitcher who played briefly for the 1922 Boston Braves.

Billy Southworth Jr.

=== February ===
- February 1 – Tubby Spencer, 61, backup catcher who played for the St. Louis Browns, Boston Red Sox, Philadelphia Phillies and Detroit Tigers in all or parts of nine seasons spanning 1905–1918.
- February 11 – Ham Iburg, 71, pitcher for the Philadelphia Phillies in 1902, who later posted three 20-win consecutive seasons at the Pacific Coast League from 1903 to 1905.
- February 13 – Jocko Halligan, 76, backup outfielder who played from 1890 through 1892 in the National League for the Baltimore Orioles, Cincinnati Reds and Buffalo Bisons.
- February 14 – Jim Curtiss, 83, outfielder who divided his playing time between the Cincinnati Reds and the Washington Statesmen from 1891 to 1892.
- February 15
  - Steve Behel, 84, backup outfielder who played with the Milwaukee Brewers of the Union Association in 1884 and for the New York Metropolitans of the American Association in 1886.
  - Major Billy Southworth Jr., USAAF, 27, decorated bomber pilot and former minor-league outfielder; son of the Cardinals' manager.
- February 18 – John Munyan, 84, catcher who played for the Cleveland Blues, Columbus Solons and St. Louis Browns of the National League in a span of three seasons from 1887 to 1891.
- February 20 – Charlie Heard, 73, pitcher and outfielder who played for the Pittsburgh Alleghenys of the National League during the 1890 season.
- February 21 – Paul Radford, 83, outfielder and shortstop for nine different teams in a 12-season career (1883–1894), who collected 1,206 hits and 346 stolen bases in 1,361 games; member of the 1884 world champion Providence Grays and three pennant-winning teams.

=== March ===
- March 4 – Malachi Hogan, outfielder who appeared in one game for the Cleveland Bluebirds on August 13, 1901.
- March 6 – Harry O'Neill, 27, catcher for the 1939 Philadelphia Athletics, whose name is linked forever to that of Elmer Gedeon as the only two major leaguers that were killed during World War II.
- March 11 – Sam Mertes, 72, left fielder for five clubs in ten seasons spanning 1896–1906; led the National League with 32 doubles and 104 RBI in 1903, and a member of the 1905 World Series champion New York Giants.
- March 17 – Rip Ragan, 65, pitcher who worked in two games for the Cincinnati Reds in September 1903.
- March 29:
  - Ray Tift, 60, pitcher for the 1907 New York Highlanders of the American League.
  - Jim Hughey, 76, pitcher who played for the Milwaukee Brewers, Chicago Colts, St. Louis Browns, Cleveland Spiders and St. Louis Cardinals in a span of seven seasons from 1891 to 1900.

=== April ===
- April 4 – Dick Cotter, 55, catcher who played from 1911 to 1912 for the Philadelphia Phillies and Chicago Cubs.
- April 9 – Ted Cather, 55, outfielder who appeared in 201 games from 1912 through 1915 for the St. Louis Cardinals and Boston Braves; member of the 1914 World Series-champion "Miracle Braves."
- April 13 – Joe Kutina, 60, first baseman who played in 1911 and 1912 with the St. Louis Browns.
- April 16 – Chick Fewster, 48, second baseman who played in 644 games from 1917 through 1927 for the New York Yankees, Boston Red Sox, Cleveland Indians and Brooklyn Robins; perhaps best known for his involvement in one of the most famous flubs in MLB history, the "three men on third" incident, which occurred on August 15, 1926.
- April 25 – Jim Murray, 67, outfielder who played for the Chicago Orphans, St. Louis Browns and Boston Braves in parts of three seasons spanning 1902–1914.

=== May ===
- May 2 – Joe Corbett, 69, pitcher who played for the Washington Senators, Baltimore Orioles and St. Louis Cardinals National League clubs during four seasons between 1895 and 1904.
- May 3 – Bill Stemmyer, 79, fireball pitcher for the Boston Beaneaters and Cleveland Blues from 1885 to 1898, who in 1886 led the National League in SO/9IP (6.17), but threw 63 wild pitches which is still the highest single-season total in MLB history.
- May 6 – Eddie Zimmerman, 62, third baseman who played for with the St. Louis Cardinals in 1906 and for the 1911 Brooklyn Dodgers in 1911.
- May 18 – Pete Cregan, 70, backup outfielder for the 1899 New York Giants and the 1903 Cincinnati Reds.
- May 22 – Jake Atz, 65, middle infielder who played with the Washington Senators in 1902 and Chicago White Sox from 1907 to 1909; spent 27 years as a minor-league manager, winning six consecutive Texas League pennants with the Fort Worth Panthers from 1920 to 1925.
- May 25 – Charlie Frye, 30, pitcher for the 1940 Philadelphia Phillies.
- May 27 – Walter Carlisle, 63, English left fielder for the 1908 Boston Red Sox, who entered the records books as the only outfielder ever to make an unassisted triple play in organized baseball, while playing for the 1911 Vernon Tigers of the Pacific Coast League.

=== June ===
- June 5 – Fred Lewis, 86, outfielder who played in 1881 and from 1883 through 1886 for the Boston Red Caps, Philadelphia Quakers, St. Louis Browns/Maroons and Cincinnati Red Stockings.
- June 8 – Bill Kemmer, 71, third baseman for the 1895 Louisville Colonels of the National League.
- June 17 – Joe Visner, 85, catcher and outfielder who played with the Baltimore Orioles, Brooklyn Bridegrooms, Pittsburgh Burghers, Washington Statesmen and St. Louis Browns in a span of four seasons from 1885 to 1891; member of the Brooklyn club that won the 1889 American Association pennant.
- June 18 – Sid Mercer, 64, Hall of Fame sportswriter who covered mostly boxing and baseball in St. Louis and New York City; also served as an official with the St. Louis Browns from 1903 through 1905.
- June 19 – Bob Gandy, 51, outfielder for the 1916 Philadelphia Phillies.
- June 25 – Jack Mercer, 56, pitcher who played for the Pittsburgh Pirates in 1910.
- June 29 – Clarence Winters, 45, pitcher who made four mound appearances for the 1924 Boston Red Sox.

=== July ===
- July 1 – Joe Ranson, 44, catcher for the 1926 Cleveland Elites of the Negro National League.
- July 2 – Frank Grube, 40, catcher who played in 394 games from 1931 through 1936 and in 1941 for the Chicago White Sox and St. Louis Browns.
- July 7 – Ollie Anderson, 65, who spent almost 40 years as a minor-league umpire, and officiated in 152 games for the 1914 Federal League, then considered an "outlaw" circuit now thought of as a major league.
- July 10:
  - Bill Barnes, 87, outfielder who played in 1887 for the St. Paul Saints of the Union Association.
  - Frank Butler, 78, backup outfielder for the 1895 New York Giants.
- July 16 – Tuck Turner, 72, outfielder who played from 1893 through 1898 for the Philadelphia Phillies and St. Louis Browns of the National League; a .320 career hitter who accomplished a rare feat by hitting an inside-the-park grand slam in 1897, whose .418 batting average posted in 1894 is ninth all-time for a single-season in MLB history, as well as the highest for a switch hitter.
- July 31 – Snapper Kennedy, 66, outfielder who played in 1902 with the Chicago Orphans of the National League.

Bobby Veach

=== August ===
- August 7 – Bobby Veach, 57, left fielder for the Detroit Tigers (1912–1923), Boston Red Sox (1924–1925), New York Yankees (1925) and Washington Senators (1925), who batted .310 lifetime and led the American League in RBI three times and in doubles twice.
- August 9 – Art Nichols, 74, catcher, first baseman and outfielder who played from 1898 through 1903 for the Chicago Orphans and St. Louis Cardinals.
- August 14 – Tommy Clarke, 57, a fine defensive catcher who spent ten years from 1909 to 1918 for the Cincinnati Reds and Chicago Cubs; served as a coach on the 1933 World Series-champion New York Giants.
- August 18 – Dan McGarvey, 57, one of the Detroit Tigers' hastily recruited amateur replacement players in the May 18, 1912 game when the Detroit club staged a wildcat strike to protest Ty Cobb's suspension; the Tigers lost to the host Philadelphia Athletics, 24–2; playing left field and batting cleanup, McGarvey, then 24, went hitless in three at bats.

=== September ===
- September 3 – Charles "Dusty" Miller, 76, outfielder for Baltimore (1889) and St. Louis (1890) of the American Association, and Cincinnati (1895–1899) and St. Louis (1899) of the National League; appeared in 656 MLB games, and batted .301 with 771 career hits.
- September 4 – William Fischer, 54, catcher for the Brooklyn Dodgers/Robins, Chicago Whales, Chicago Cubs and Pittsburgh Pirates during five seasons from 1913 to 1917; his 96 hits, .329 batting average and 50 RBI—as a part-time player—helped the Whales win the 1915 Federal League pennant,
- September 12:
  - Cy Pieh, 58, pitcher who played from 1913 to 1915 with the New York Yankees.
  - Dave Zearfoss, 77, backup catcher for the New York Giants and St. Louis Cardinals in parts of five seasons spanning 1896–1905.
- September 13 – Cy Blanton, 37, All-Star pitcher and one of the mainstays of the Pittsburgh Pirates rotation in the 1930s; won 18 games and led NL in earned run average (2.58) and shutouts (4) in his 1935 rookie season, then led his league in shutouts (four) in 1936 and games started (34) in 1937.
- September 18 – Ducky Holmes, 63, fine outfielder and smart base runner for seven different teams from 1895 through 1905, who posted a .281 career average and stole 236 bases in 933 games; also managed 13 seasons in the minor leagues.
- September 21 – Bert Humphries, 64, pitcher who played from 1910 through 1915 for the Cincinnati Reds, Chicago Cubs and Philadelphia Phillies; led NL in winning percentage (.800) when he went 16–4 for the 1913 Cubs.
- September 27 – Lou Nordyke, 69, first baseman for the St. Louis Browns of the American League in 1906.

=== October ===
- October 1 – George Van Haltren, 79, center fielder, primarily with the 1894–1903 New York Giants, who hit a .316 lifetime average and ranked sixth all-time in both hits (2,500+) and runs upon retirement; led the National League in triples and stolen bases once each; a southpaw, he also won 40 games as pitcher, including a six-inning no-hitter, and appeared in 79 games as a rare, left-handed shortstop.
- October 8 – Al Klawitter, 56, pitcher who worked in 15 career games for the 1909–1910 New York Giants and 1913 Detroit Tigers.
- October 9 – Bob Ganley, 70, outfielder who played from 1905 through 1909 for the Pittsburgh Pirates, Washington Senators and Philadelphia Athletics.
- October 12 – Henry Oxley, 87, Canadian catcher who played in 1884 with the New York Gothams and the New York Metropolitans.
- October 14 – Fred Tyler, 53, catcher for the 1914 Boston Braves.
- October 16 – Hack Eibel, 51, outfielder and pitcher who played in 1912 with the Cleveland Naps and Boston Red Sox in 1920.
- October 18:
  - John "Biff" Clark, 41, outfielder for the Memphis Red Sox, Chicago American Giants and Louisville White Sox of the Negro National League between 1928 and 1931.
  - Monty Pfyl, 59, first baseman for the 1907 New York Giants in 1907.
- October 25 – Ernie Baker, 70, pitcher for the 1905 Cincinnati Reds.
- October 26 – Ernie Gust, 57, first baseman for the 1911 St. Louis Browns.
- October 27:
  - Jack Hannifin, 62, infielder who played for the Philadelphia Athletics, New York Giants and Boston Doves between 1906 and 1908.
  - Taylor Shafer, 79, second baseman and outfielder who divided his playing time between the Altoona Mountain City, Kansas City Cowboys and Baltimore Monumentals of the Union Association in 1883, then later played for the Philadelphia Athletics of the National League in 1890.

=== November ===
- November 1 – George Hale, 51, backup catcher for the St. Louis Browns in four seasons from 1914 to 1918.
- November 3 – Mike Smith, 77, left fielder and pitcher who posted a .310 career batting average and a 75–57 pitching record with six teams from 1886 through 1901; led American Association (AA) pitchers with a 2.94 ERA in 1887.
- November 11 – William Stein, 77, left-handed pitcher for the 1890 Philadelphia Athletics (AA).
- November 16 – Jake Northrop, pitcher for the Boston Braves from 1918 to 1919.
- November 18 – Morrie Rath, 58, speedy and skilled second baseman for four teams in a span of six years from 1909 to 1920, who led both the American and National Leagues in fielding percentage, putouts, assists and double plays; member of the 1919 World Series champion Cincinnati Reds.
- November 22 – Dick Carroll, 61, pitcher for the 1909 New York Highlanders of the American League.
- November 25 – Ham Patterson, 68, first baseman and outfielder who played for the St. Louis Browns and the Chicago White Sox in 1909.

=== December ===
- December 3 – Bill Kay, 67, outfielder who played in 1907 for the Washington Senators of the American League.
- December 7 – Cal Crum, 56, pitcher who played for the 1917–1918 Boston Braves.
- December 8 – Henry Fournier, 80, pitcher for the 1894 Cincinnati Reds.
- December 14 – Connie Murphy, 75, catcher who played from 1893 to 1894 for the Cincinnati Reds.
- December 15 – Tom Hess, 70, catcher for the 1892 Baltimore Orioles of the National League.
- December 22 – Bill Crouch, 59, pitcher who played in 1910 with the St. Louis Browns of the American League.
- December 24 – Hughie Miller, 59, first baseman who played with the Philadelphia Phillies in 1911 and from 1914 to 1915 for the St. Louis Terriers of the Federal League.
- December 26 – Frank Lange, 62, pitcher for the 1910 Chicago White Sox.
- December 27:
  - Gene Cocreham, pitcher who played from 1897 to 1898 for the Washington Senators of the National League.
  - Hugh Fullerton, 72, Chicago sportswriter who helped break the story of the Black Sox Scandal and, as an early advocate of the value of baseball statistics, gained wide attention for correctly predicting the White Sox' upset of the Cubs in the 1906 World Series, even getting right the winner of each game and the day of a rainout.
  - Cy Swaim, 71, pitcher who played with the Washington Senators of the National League in 1897 and 1898.
