= Southworth (surname) =

Southworth is a surname. Notable people with the surname include:

- Albert Southworth (1811–1894), co-proprietor of Southworth & Hawes studio
- Azariah Southworth (born 1987), American music producer and broadcaster
- Benjamin Southworth (1878–1924) American football player, physician and surgeon.
- Bill Southworth (born 1946), American baseball player.
- Billy Southworth (1893–1969), American baseball player and manager
- Billy Southworth Jr. (1917–1945), American baseball player and bomber pilot
- Bobby Southworth (born 1969), American mixed martial arts fighter
- Dorothy Fay Southworth (1915–2003), American actress also known as Dorothy Fay
- E. D. E. N. Southworth (1819–1899), American writer
- Effie A. Southworth (1860–1947), American botanist and plant pathologist
- George Clark Southworth (1890–1972), American radio engineer discoverer of waveguides
- Gilbert de Southworth (b. 1270), architect of Samlesbury Hall
- Helen Southworth (born 1956), United Kingdom politician
- John Southworth (martyr) (1592–1654), English Catholic martyr
- John Southworth (musician) (born 1972), Canadian pop singer-songwriter
- Lucinda Southworth, wife of Google co-founder Larry Page

Fictional characters:

- Miss Ellie Ewing Farlow, née Southworth, character in the American television series Dallas
