= Southworth =

Southworth may refer to:

== People ==
- Southworth (surname)

== Places ==
- Southworth, Ohio, an unincorporated community
- Southworth, Washington – unincorporated community on Puget Sound in Kitsap County, Washington
- Point Southworth – on Kitsap Peninsula on the western side of the northern entrance to Colvos Passage in Puget Sound
- Southworth Creek, a stream in Oregon

== Others uses ==
- Southworth & Hawes – an early photographic firm in Boston.
