= Billy Southworth =

American baseball player, coach, manager (1893–1969)

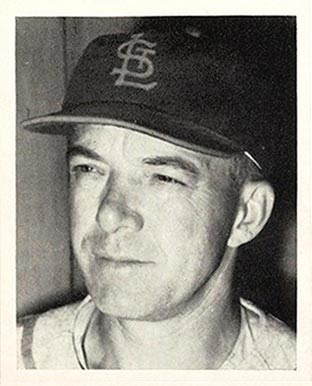
- Southworth in 1941
- Right fielder / Manager
- Born: March 9, 1893; Harvard, Nebraska, U.S.
- Died: November 15, 1969 (aged 76); Columbus, Ohio, U.S.
- Batted: Left Threw: Right

MLB debut
- August 4, 1913, for the Cleveland Indians

Last MLB appearance
- July 9, 1929, for the St. Louis Cardinals

MLB statistics
- Batting average: .297
- Home runs: 52
- Runs batted in: 561
- Managerial record: 1,044–704–22
- Winning %: .597
- Stats at Baseball Reference
- Managerial record at Baseball Reference

Teams
- As player: Cleveland Indians (1913, 1915); Pittsburgh Pirates (1918–1920); Boston Braves (1921–1923); New York Giants (1924–1926); St. Louis Cardinals (1926–1927, 1929); As manager: St. Louis Cardinals (1929, 1940–1945); Boston Braves (1946–1949, 1950–1951)

Career highlights and awards
- 3× World Series champion (1926, 1942, 1944); St. Louis Cardinals Hall of Fame

Member of the National

Baseball Hall of Fame
- Induction: 2008
- Vote: 81.3%
- Election method: Veterans Committee

William Harold Southworth (March 9, 1893 – November 15, 1969) was an American professional baseball right fielder and manager. He played 13 seasons in Major League Baseball (MLB) for the Cleveland Indians, Pittsburgh Pirates, Boston Braves, New York Giants, and St. Louis Cardinals from 1913 to 1929, and managed for the Cardinals and Braves from 1929 to 1951. As a player, Southworth played in almost 1,200 games, fell just short of 1,300 hits, batted .297 lifetime, and won the World Series in 1926. As manager, he oversaw three pennant-winning Cardinals teams, winning two World Series in 1942 and 1944, and another pennant with the 1948 Braves, the last National League title in Boston baseball history. As manager of the Cardinals, his .642 winning percentage is the second-highest in franchise history and the highest since 1900.

Late in life, Southworth served as a scout for the Braves. He endured a great deal of tragedy in his baseball career, first experiencing the stillbirth of his twin babies and the deaths of his wife and his adult son. He died in 1969. He was inducted into the Baseball Hall of Fame in 2008. Six years later, the Cardinals inducted him into the St. Louis Cardinals Hall of Fame Museum. He also belongs to the Alabama Sports Hall of Fame. Southworth had a son, Billy Southworth Jr., and a cousin, Bill Southworth, who both played professional baseball.

== Early life and playing career ==
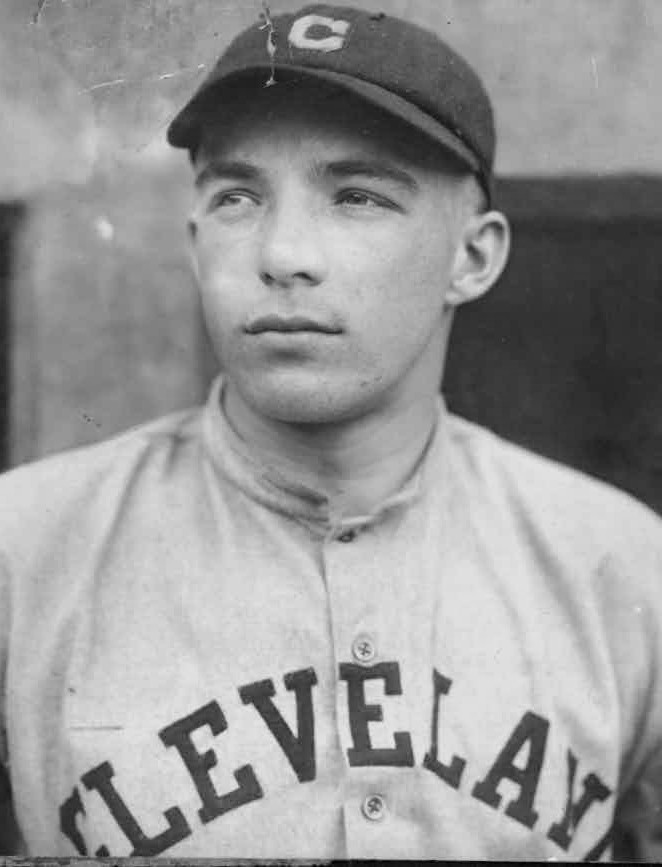
Southworth in 1915

Southworth was born in Harvard, Nebraska, to Orlando and Mariah Southworth and raised in Columbus, Ohio. He had four older brothers who played baseball. Before he was old enough to play with them, Southworth would give his old socks to his brothers so they could create makeshift balls. Southworth decided to play baseball against his father's wishes. Orlando Southworth had wanted his son to attend college. At the age of 19, he signed a contract with the Portsmouth Cobblers team in the Ohio State League. He joined the Cleveland Indians in 1913, but only appeared in one game, entering as a replacement on defense.

In 1914, Southworth married Lida Brooks. She was a minister's daughter and they had met while Southworth was playing for Portsmouth. The couple's son, William Brooks Southworth, was born during Southworth's early playing career. Billy Southworth Jr. later became a professional baseball player for several seasons. The elder Southworth returned to the Cleveland Indians in 1915 and appeared in 60 games. He played for the Birmingham Barons in 1917 and part of 1918, when he made the Pittsburgh Pirates and played in 64 major league games.

Southworth played more regularly in 1919, appearing in 121 games and leading the league with 14 triples. With the exception of two seasons, Southworth played in at least that many games through 1926. In 1926, Southworth's offensive production increased and he finished the season with a .320 batting average, 16 home runs and 99 RBI. He ran into difficulty with New York manager John McGraw that year, as Southworth's independent style became incompatible with McGraw's strict leadership. He was traded from the New York Giants to the St. Louis Cardinals in the middle of the season. Southworth suffered a 1927 rib injury that limited his playing time. The Cardinals' leadership began to look for a role for Southworth beyond his playing career.

== Early career as a manager ==
Southworth's managerial career began in 1928 with the Rochester Red Wings of the AA International League (IL), the top club in the Cardinals' farm system. In May, Southworth and his wife experienced the stillbirths of twins. Southworth returned home after losing the twins, but he quickly came back to Rochester. Late in the season, Southworth received word that Billy Jr. had been accidentally shot by a neighbor in Columbus. His son recovered, but the experience shook the manager. The team won the IL championship that season.

Southworth was promoted to St. Louis as player-manager for 1929, replacing Bill McKechnie, who won a National League pennant in 1928 and lost the World Series in four straight games to the New York Yankees. Southworth's Major League playing career reached the end of the road, as he appeared in only 19 games, five in the outfield, and batted only .188 with six hits. He finished with a .297 batting average in 1,192 MLB games played, with 52 home runs, 91 triples, 173 doubles, 661 runs scored, and 561 RBI. He stole 138 bases in his career and had double-digit steal totals in eight seasons. As a big leaguer, Southworth had 1,296 hits in 4,359 at bats.

His 1929 MLB managerial debut was not much more successful than his playing stint. Only one year removed from being a teammate of his charges, he attempted to impose discipline on the Cardinals, banning them from driving their own automobiles. The team did not respond to his hard line and won only 43 of their first 88 games. Southworth was sent back to Rochester on July 21, McKechnie was rehired, and the Cardinals finished in fourth place.

Although Southworth immediately resumed his successful minor league managerial career, the firing and personal tragedy — the death of his wife Lida at age 42 — began a downward spiral. Beset by struggles with alcoholism, he quit a coaching job with the 1933 Giants during spring training and left baseball for two seasons. After a recovery, he rejoined the Cardinals' minor league system in 1935 and by 1939 he was again enjoying success as Rochester's manager. He remarried in 1935, wedding the former Mabel Stemen, with whom he had a daughter.

== Return to the Cardinals ==
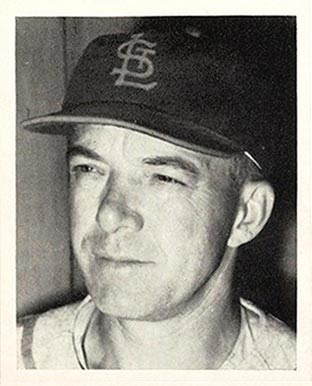
Southworth as Cardinals manager

In June 1940, he received a second chance with the struggling Cardinals when owner Sam Breadon fired manager Ray Blades and promoted Southworth from Rochester. This time, the Cards flourished under him. With talented players such as Enos Slaughter, Marty Marion, Stan Musial, Walker Cooper, Mort Cooper, Whitey Kurowski and Johnny Beazley being harvested each spring from the club's farm system, the Cardinals entered a Golden Age in their history. Upon Southworth's appointment, they won 69 of 109 games and jumped from seventh to third place in 1940. The following season they won 97 games and finished second.

From 1942 to 1944, the Cardinals won 106, 105 and 105 games, three pennants and two World Series titles. Southworth was the first manager to lead a team to 100 wins in three consecutive seasons. His 1942 Cardinals, who breezed to the World Series championship in five games, were the only team (out of eight) to ever defeat Joe McCarthy's New York Yankees in a Fall Classic. In 1943, both teams met again in the World Series; but this time, the Yankees turned the tables on the Redbirds, winning in five games. The Cards' third successive National League pennant, in 1944, produced another world championship, a six-game triumph over the American League (AL) St. Louis Browns. With it, Southworth had presided over one of the most dominant three-year stretches in National League (NL) history.

However, another personal family tragedy struck when on February 15, 1945, his son, Billy Jr., by then a United States Army Air Forces major, died when his Boeing B-29 Superfortress crashed into Flushing Bay, New York after taking off from Mitchel Field, New York, on a training flight to Florida.

Still, Southworth began managing at the beginning of the 1945 season, which saw his Cardinals win 95 games but finish second, three games behind the Chicago Cubs.

== Later managerial career ==
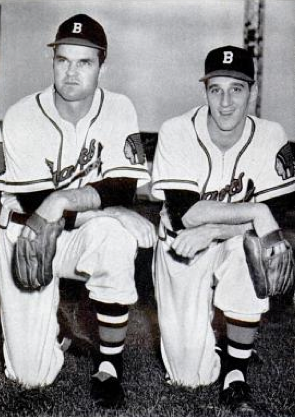
Pitchers Johnny Sain (left) and Warren Spahn, who each won over 15 games for the 1948 Braves under Southworth.

Southworth moved to the Boston Braves in 1946, signing a then-lucrative managing contract for a reported $50,000 per season, and immediately led the Braves into the first division. Talented pitchers Johnny Sain and Warren Spahn had both returned from service in World War II that year.

In 1948, the Braves won their second NL pennant of the 20th century—and Boston's last National League title—but were defeated in six games by the Cleveland Indians in the 1948 World Series. In that World Series, all of the games were close except for one, when the Braves beat pitcher Bob Feller 11–5. Author John Rossi writes that Sain lost some respect for Southworth after the manager said that managing and not talent had won the 1948 pennant. Sain had already become irritated with Southworth after the 1948 signing of unproven "bonus baby" pitcher Johnny Antonelli. Sain and Southworth rarely spoke after 1948.

During the following season, 1949, Boston struggled on the field and was in chaos off the diamond. Southworth was rumored to be drinking heavily and near nervous collapse. Some players complained about his rules and regulations, and some, including starting shortstop Alvin Dark and second baseman Eddie Stanky, were critical of his drinking. Meanwhile, others, like Sain, resented the amount of credit Southworth had received for the 1948 pennant. With Boston at 55–54 on August 16, Southworth turned the Braves over to coach Johnny Cooney for the remainder of 1949. A newspaper account at the time characterized the change as a leave of absence for health reasons. With Cooney, the Braves finished fourth. A finish that high in the standings guaranteed the team shares of the World Series money, but the Braves players voted to only give Southworth a quarter share.

After some of the rebellious players (including Dark and Stanky) had been traded, Southworth returned to his post in 1950 and led the Braves to a fourth-place finish. On August 29, 1950, Southworth recorded his 1,000th win as manager, leading the Braves to a 4–0 win over Cincinnati. Southworth had managed to convert a team that hadn't finished fourth since 1934 into one that would finish fourth or better for six straight seasons. However, an aging team and declining attendance would bode poorly for both Southworth's career and the Braves' future in New England. In 1951, Southworth's club was only 28–31 on June 19. He called the team's general manager, John Quinn, and asked to be allowed to resign, and he was replaced by his former standout right fielder, Tommy Holmes (he would finish out the season but was fired in the middle of what turned out to be the final season of the Braves in Boston).

Southworth's major league managerial win–loss record was 1,044–704–22. His .597 winning percentage is seventh all-time among managers to McCarthy's .615. Southworth has the fewest games managed (1,770) for any manager to have won 1,000 games. Southworth was the first to win the World Series as a player and again as a manager.

Southworth remained with the Braves as a scout in the 1950s. He was acquitted of drunken driving charges after a 1955 arrest, and retired from scouting at the end of his contract following the 1956 season. During his scouting days, he signed future all-time home run leader Hank Aaron, who was playing for the Indianapolis Clowns of the Negro leagues.

== Managerial career ==
Team	Year	Regular season					Postseason			
Team	Year	Games	Won	Lost	Win %	Finish	Won	Lost	Win %	Result
STL	1929	90	43	45	.489	(reassigned)	–	–	–	–
STL	1940	111	69	40	.633	3rd in NL	–	–	–	–
STL	1941	155	97	56	.634	2nd in NL	–	–	–	–
STL	1942	156	106	48	.688	1st in NL	4	1	.800	Won World Series (NYY)
STL	1943	157	105	49	.682	1st in NL	1	4	.200	Lost World Series (NYY)
STL	1944	157	105	49	.682	1st in NL	4	2	.667	Won World Series (SLB)
STL	1945	155	95	59	.617	2nd in NL	–	–	–	–
STL total		981	620	346	.642		9	7	.563	
BOB	1946	154	81	72	.529	4th in NL	–	–	–	–
BOB	1947	154	86	68	.558	3rd in NL	–	–	–	–
BOB	1948	154	91	62	.595	1st in NL	2	4	.333	Lost World Series (CLE)
BOB	1949	111	55	54	.505	(resigned)	–	–	–	–
BOB	1950	156	83	71	.539	4th in NL	–	–	–	–
BOB	1951	60	28	31	.475	(resigned)	–	–	–	–
BOB total		789	424	358	.542		2	4	.333	
Total		1,770	1,044	704	.597		11	11	.500	

== Later life ==
For the last couple of decades of his life, Southworth lived outside of Sunbury, Ohio. By the summer of 1969, his health had begun to fail and he was confined to his home. He gave a final interview to a reporter for the St. Louis Post-Dispatch; he commented on how difficult it would be for the 1969 Cardinals to win a third straight National League championship, as the 1944 team had done. Though he had quit smoking many years earlier, Southworth died of emphysema that year in Columbus, Ohio, and was buried in Green Lawn Cemetery.

Southworth's cousin, Bill Southworth, appeared in the major leagues in 1964.

== Legacy ==
Dark recalled that Southworth was a "mild" person who wanted everyone to like him. He preferred to let his players play according to their respective styles, rather than micro-managing their every moves. However, he would give some advice - when going over lineups before a game, he would tell his pitchers to pitch every hitter "High, tight, and low and away." On batting practice, he wanted every hitter to approach it like he was in an actual game, and he would award bench players who performed well with additional playing time.

Southworth was elected to the Baseball Hall of Fame in 2008. He had been eligible for election as a player in the 1940s, but he received few votes. After Southworth had been left off of the ballot as a manager in 2003, author Raymond Mileur had begun a campaign of letter writing, phone calls to the Hall of Fame, radio show comments and advocacy through his website known as "The Birdhouse". Southworth was elected after receiving 13 votes from the 16-member Veterans Committee.

On the occasion of Southworth's election to the Hall of Fame, one of his former players on the 1948 Braves, Clint Conatser, paid tribute to his old manager. "He just had a gut feeling about the right thing to do in a situation", Conatser recalled. "The moves he would make would work for him — all the time, not occasionally. Leo Durocher was the same way. It's like some guys can pick horses out of nowhere. Southworth was a genius like that on the diamond."

In January 2014, the Cardinals announced that Southworth was among 22 former players and personnel to be inducted into the St. Louis Cardinals Hall of Fame Museum for the inaugural class of 2014. He is also a member of the Alabama Sports Hall of Fame.

== See also ==
- List of St. Louis Cardinals team records
- List of Major League Baseball annual triples leaders
- List of Major League Baseball player-managers
- List of Major League Baseball managers with most career wins
