= Harry O'Neill (catcher) =

American baseball player (1917–1945)

- Born: May 18, 1917; Philadelphia, Pennsylvania
- Died: March 6, 1945 (aged 27); Iwo Jima, Bonin Islands, Japanese Empire
- Burial place: Drexel Hill, Pennsylvania
- Education: Gettysburg College
- Military career
- Allegiance: United States
- Branch: United States Marine Corps
- Service years: 1942–1945
- Rank: First Lieutenant
- Units: 25th Marine Regiment, 4th Marine Division
- Conflicts: World War II
- Awards: Purple Heart

Harry Mink O'Neill (May 8, 1917 – March 6, 1945) was an American professional baseball player who appeared in one game for the Philadelphia Athletics in 1939, as a catcher. O'Neill and Elmer Gedeon were the only two Major League Baseball players killed during World War II.

== Collegiate athletics ==
O'Neill distinguished himself as a very gifted college athlete. At Gettysburg College, the 6-foot-3, 205-pounder sometimes called "Porkie," led the school's baseball, football and basketball teams to league championships. After graduation, he was the subject of a bidding war between two American League teams, eventually signing with his hometown Athletics.

== Major league appearance ==
Harry O'Neill
- Catcher
- Batted: Right Threw: Right

MLB debut
- July 23, 1939, for the Philadelphia Athletics

Last MLB appearance
- July 23, 1939, for the Philadelphia Athletics

MLB statistics
- Games played: 1
- Plate appearances: 0
- Stats at Baseball Reference

Teams
- Philadelphia Athletics (1939)

As the third-string catcher for the Athletics, O'Neill appeared in just one game, as a late-inning defensive replacement. In a lopsided road loss to the Detroit Tigers on July 23, 1939, O'Neill caught the bottom of the 8th inning, and did not have a plate appearance.

== Military service and death in World War II ==
Following his time with the Athletics, O'Neill played in 16 games with the minor league Harrisburg Senators and also played semi-pro basketball and football. After the outbreak of World War II, O'Neill enlisted in the United States Marine Corps in 1942, and rose to the rank of first lieutenant with the Weapons Company, 25th Marine Regiment, 4th Marine Division. In January 1944, he took part in the amphibious assault on Kwajalein. On June 16, 1944, the second day of the Battle of Saipan, he was wounded in the shoulder by shrapnel, then treated for weeks back in the US. He returned to active duty in July, in time to participate in the Battle of Tinian. He was killed by a sniper at Iwo Jima on March 6, 1945. Among his surviving family was his young wife, Ethel McKay O'Neill.

== Legacy ==
Of the 500-plus major league players who served in the military in World War II, O'Neill and Elmer Gedeon were the only players killed, both at age 27. The two have become symbols of "baseball's sacrifice" in the war effort. As the National Baseball Hall of Fame and Museum proclaims: "Ballplayers, like every other American citizen, understand the importance of giving one's self for their country." In 1980, O'Neill was inducted into Gettysburg College's Hall of Athletic Honor for baseball, football and basketball.

== See also ==
- List of baseball players who died during their careers
