= Joe Ranson =

American baseball player (1900-1945)

- Catcher
- Born: December 28, 1900; New Orleans, Louisiana, U.S.
- Died: July 1, 1945 (aged 44); South Bend, Indiana, U.S.

Negro league baseball debut
- 1926, for the Cleveland Elites

Last appearance
- 1926, for the Cleveland Elites

Teams
- Cleveland Elites (1926)

Joseph Alexander Ranson (December 28, 1900 – July 1, 1945) was an American Negro league catcher in the 1920s.

A native of New Orleans, Louisiana, Ranson played for the Cleveland Elites in 1926. In nine recorded games, he posted two hits in 19 plate appearances. Ranson died in South Bend, Indiana in 1945 at age 44.
