= Elmer Gedeon =

American baseball player (1917–1944)

- Born: April 15, 1917; Cleveland, Ohio, US
- Died: April 20, 1944 (aged 27); Saint-Pol, German-occupied France
- Burial place: Arlington National Cemetery
- Education: University of Michigan
- Military career
- Allegiance: United States of America
- Branch: United States Army Air Forces
- Service years: 1941–1944
- Rank: Captain
- Units: 586th Bomb Squadron, 394th Bombardment Group
- Conflicts: World War II: European air campaign †
- Awards: Soldier's Medal; Purple Heart

Elmer John Gedeon (April 15, 1917 – April 20, 1944) was an American professional baseball player, appearing in several games for the Washington Senators in 1939. Gedeon and Harry O'Neill were the only two Major League Baseball players killed during World War II. Gedeon flew several missions in the European Theater of Operations as an officer of the United States Army Air Forces before being shot down over France.

During college at the University of Michigan, Gedeon became an All-American in track and field, and earned varsity letters in both football and baseball. He tied a world record in the high hurdles in 1938. After graduating, Gedeon had a stint in Major League Baseball as an outfielder for the Washington Senators. Gedeon spent most of the 1939 and 1940 baseball seasons in the minor leagues, but he was called up to the Senators in September 1939.

Gedeon's baseball career was cut short when he was drafted by the United States Army in early 1941. He trained as a bomber pilot, and was decorated for bravery after his plane crashed on a training flight in 1942. He later served in combat, and was shot down and killed while piloting a Martin B-26 Marauder on a mission over France in April 1944.

== Growing up in Cleveland ==
Born on April 15, 1917, in Cleveland, Gedeon was a star athlete at Cleveland's West High School, where he was a member of the class of 1935. He was a 6 ft 4 in (1.93 m) athlete who excelled in American football, baseball, and track and field. While ice skating in Brookside Park in Cleveland as a youth, the ice gave way and Gedeon's cousin plunged through up to his neck. The cousin later recalled: "Elmer slid across the ice on his belly and pulled me out." Some sources state that Joe Gedeon, a Major League Baseball player who was implicated in the Chicago Black Sox scandal was Elmer's uncle, but this is unlikely—he may have been a more remote relative.

Gedeon's surname was common in Cleveland, because many people from Sudetenland, where it was common, settled in Cleveland. One finding was that Gedeon's widow, who was named Laura, later moved to Florida. Another was that his third cousin Charlotte Gedeon said Elmer carried her grandmother's casket during a funeral.

== Collegiate athletics ==
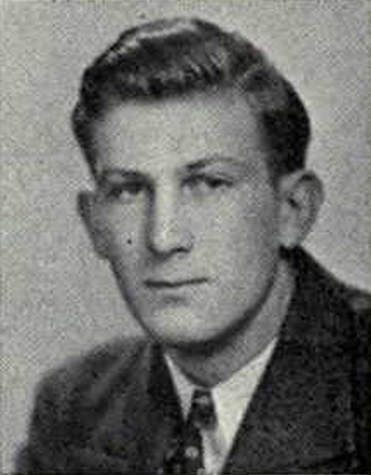
Gedeon from 1939 Michiganensian

Gedeon enrolled at the University of Michigan in 1935 where he earned varsity letters in three sports: baseball, football, and track and field. Gedeon's best sport was track and field, in which he was a two-time Big Ten Conference champion in the outdoor 120-yard high hurdles and indoor 70-yard high hurdles. In March 1938, Gedeon tied the American indoor record in the 70-yard (64 m) high hurdles at the Big Ten meet in Chicago. He went on to tie a world record in the Illinois Relays, and then won the Big Ten title despite an injury. He also led Michigan to victory in the March 1939 Big Ten indoor track and field meet in Chicago. Michigan won both the Big Ten outdoor and indoor championships in 1938–1939. At the 1938 outdoor National Collegiate Athletic Association championships, he placed third in the 120-yard (110 m) hurdles and became an All-American in track and field.

Gedeon also wore #51 for the Michigan Wolverines football program from 1936 to 1938, earning three varsity letters in football. In 1937, a feature article on the Michigan team noted that, in addition to his abilities as an end, "Gedeon can pass and punt, and can run faster than any one on the squad." In 1938, Gedeon played end in Coach Fritz Crisler's first season as Michigan's football coach. That was the year that Coach Crisler introduced the "winged football helmet" at Michigan. Team captain Fred Janke recalled Gedeon was "a tall, skinny guy", at 6 feet 4 inches (1.93 m) and 196 pounds (89 kg; 14.0 st). "A rather serious kid. He could kick quite well. They used to pull him back in serious situations and let him punt the ball, because he could punt it a mile."

In baseball, Gedeon played both first base and the outfield for the Michigan Wolverines baseball team. He was a two-time letterman in baseball and batted .320.

== Professional baseball ==
Elmer Gedeon
- Outfielder
- Batted: Right Threw: Right

MLB debut
- September 18, 1939, for the Washington Senators

Last MLB appearance
- September 24, 1939, for the Washington Senators

MLB statistics
- Games played: 5
- At bats: 15
- Hits: 3
- Stats at Baseball Reference

Teams
- Washington Senators (1939)

Gedeon signed with the Washington Senators after graduating in the summer of 1939. He chose to sign with the Senators over a possible appearance as a member of the USA's track team in the 1940 Summer Olympics. Gedeon was quite a prospect; Clark Griffith, president of the Senators, mentioned Gedeon to The Sporting News on June 15, when talking about exciting new players: "We've got ... a youngster from the University of Michigan named Gedeon." Gedeon was initially assigned to a minor league baseball team in Orlando, Florida where he played in 67 games in 1939. In mid-September, he was called up to the major leagues where he appeared in five games as an outfielder with three hits, one run and one RBI. His three hits came in a 10–9 win against the Cleveland Indians on September 19 as the starting centerfielder. In his five major league games, he played four games in center field and one in right field.

In 1940, Gedeon attended spring training with the Senators in Orlando, seeking a spot in the outfield or first base. In February 1940, newspapers ran a wire service photograph of Gedeon hurdling over Senators first baseman Jimmy Wasdell, supposedly "by way of warming up". returned to the minor leagues where he played for the Charlotte Hornets (in the Piedmont League) and hit .271 in 131 games. He was again recalled in September, but he made no appearances in any games. It appeared 1941 would see Gedeon moving to play more minor league baseball for either Greenville or Springfield. In the interim Gedeon served as an assistant football coach at Michigan.

== Military service and death in World War II ==
Gedeon was drafted into the military in January 1941, reporting to the Army instead of attending spring training. He was inducted at Fort Thomas, Kentucky and reported to the Cavalry Replacement Center at Fort Riley on March 18. He immediately became an acting corporal of Troop B of the First Squadron for the thirteen-week training program. The Bentley Historical Library at the University of Michigan owns a copy of an April 1941 fraternity newsletter with a note from Gedeon. "As you probably know by this time", he wrote to his Phi Gamma Delta brothers, "Old Ged has been drafted." On being assigned to the cavalry, Gedeon joked in the letter to his fraternity that "the only horse I ever saw in my life was the one the milkman used."

On October 22, 1941, Gedeon was accepted into pilot training despite his larger size and transferred to the United States Army Air Forces, earning his pilot's wings and a commission as a second lieutenant at Williams Field, Arizona in May 1942. He undertook twin-engined bomber training with the 21st Bomb Group at MacDill Field in Tampa, Florida. Gedeon's usual duties were to aid in European mission planning from a desk. On August 9, 1942, Gedeon was flying as the navigator in a B-25 which crashed into the middle of a swamp on take off from the municipal airport at Raleigh, North Carolina. Gedeon crawled from the burning bomber, and despite burns and three broken ribs, he went back into the wreckage, rescuing a crewmate, Corporal John R. Rarrat, who had suffered a broken back and two broken legs. Two crew members died in the crash, and Gedeon spent 12 weeks in the hospital recovering from his broken ribs and burns to his back, hands, face and legs, some requiring skin grafts. He lost 50 pounds (22.7 kg) in recovery. First Lt. Gedeon was awarded the Soldier's Medal for heroism and bravery by Major General St. Clair Streett in what was described as "one of the most colorful ceremonies ever held at MacDill Field.

"I'll be back in baseball after the war", he had said on his last leave before going overseas. Gedeon's cousin recalled: "The last time I saw him, he told me, 'I had my accident. It's going to be good flying from now on.' He said he had used up his bad luck." In February 1943, the Associated Press ran a feature story about Gedeon's war service under the headline: "Gedeon Will Return to Baseball If War Doesn’t Last Too Long." Gedeon was quoted in the article as saying "he hopes to pick up after the war where he left off." He added that "it's a matter of time." "If the war ends before I’m past the playing age I’ll return to the game. If I’m too old, I’ll do something else."

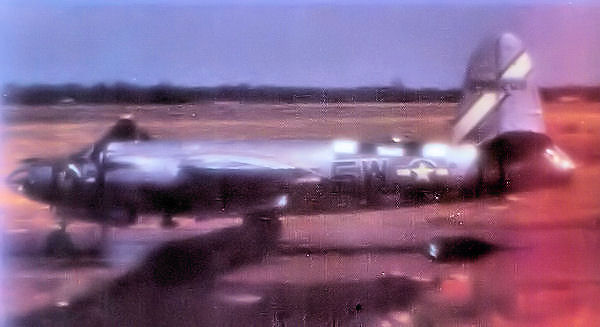
B-26 Marauder of the 394th Bomb Group at RAF Boreham.

In July 1943, Gedeon was among personnel from the 21st BG that became the cadre of the 586th Bomb Squadron, 394th Bombardment Group United States Army Air Forces, formed to train with Martin B-26 Marauders. At Ardmore Army Air Field, Oklahoma, he participated in group operational training in preparation for combat. In February 1944, the group was sent to RAF Boreham, England, to become part of the Ninth Air Force. Gedeon was assigned as Squadron Operations Officer and began flying combat missions in Europe. His first mission was to attack an airfield at Beaumont-le-Roger, France, on March 23, 1944.

On April 20, 1944, Gedeon piloted one of 36 B-26 bombers which departed RAF Boreham in the late afternoon on a special mission to attack a V-1 "buzz bomb" site being constructed at Esquerdes, a village in the Pas-de-Calais near Saint-Omer. Led by Captain Darrell R. Lindsey, it was the group's thirteenth mission. Attacking after dusk from 12,000 feet (3,700 m), the group encountered intense and accurate anti-aircraft fire, and Gedeon's plane was hit by flak below the cockpit just after bombing. Gedeon's co-pilot, his clothes on fire, was able to parachute from the bomber as it plunged toward the ground, although Gedeon and five other crew members were killed in the subsequent crash. Gedeon was initially reported as missing in action and it was not until May 1945 his family received word his grave had been located in a small British Army cemetery at Saint-Pol, France. Gedeon's remains were later returned to the United States and interred in Arlington National Cemetery, Section 34, Site 3047.

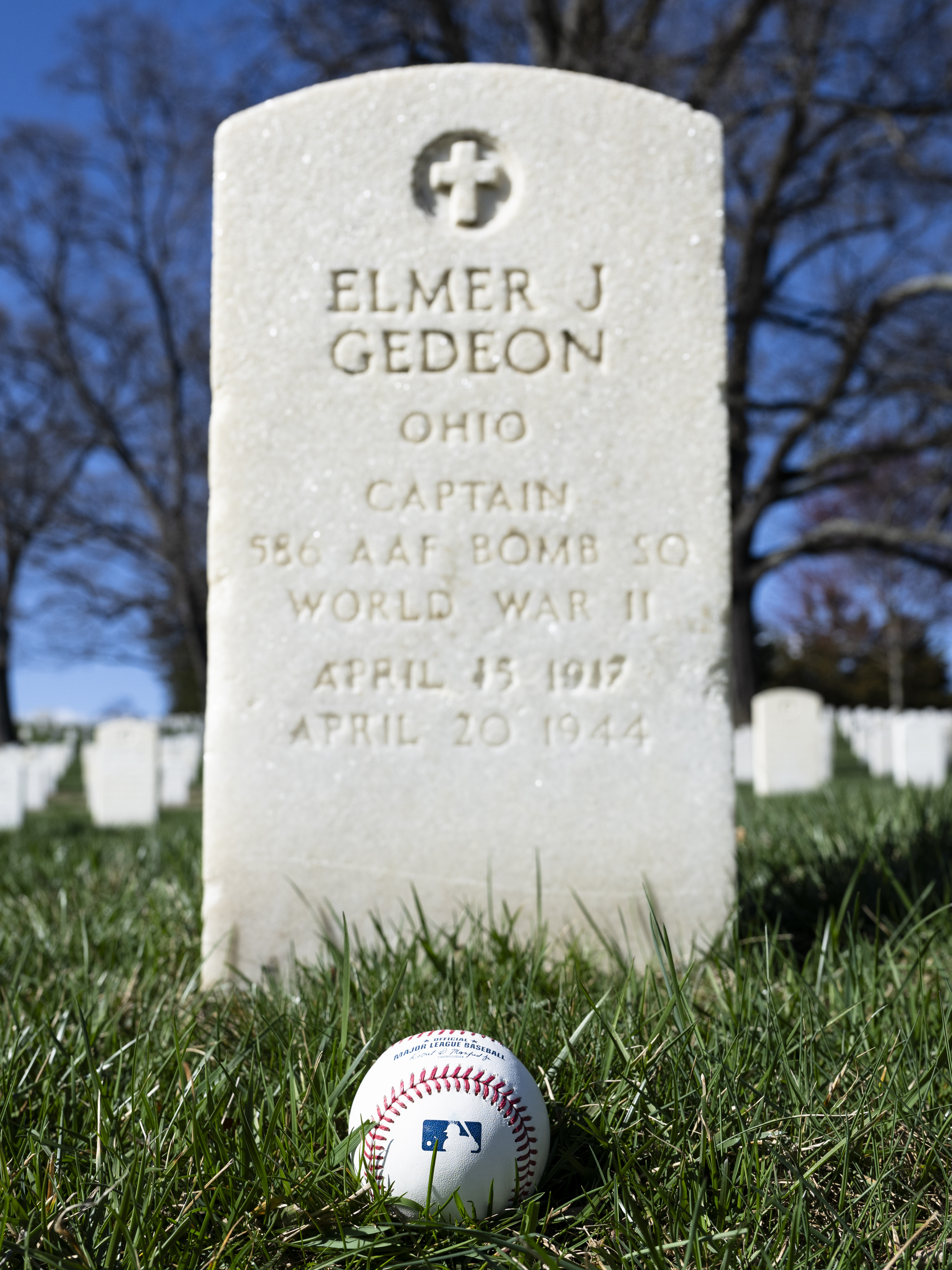
Elmer Gedeon gravestone, U.S. Army Air Forces Captain, one of only two MLB players killed during WWII, in Section 34 of Arlington National Cemetery, Virginia on March 26, 2025

Of the more than 500 major league players who served in the military in World War II, Gedeon and Harry O'Neill were the only two players killed, both at age 27. The two have become symbols of "baseball's sacrifice" in the war effort. As the National Baseball Hall of Fame and Museum proclaims: "Ballplayers, like every other American citizen, understand the importance of giving one's self for their country." After the war, a scholarship in Gedeon's name was established at the University of Michigan.

Gedeon was inducted into the University of Michigan Athletic Hall of Honor for track and baseball in 1983. He was the sixth Michigan athlete inducted for his contributions in multiple sports.

== Awards and decorations ==

| Badge | U.S. Army Air Forces Aviator Badge | | |
| 1st row | Soldier's Medal | | |
| 2nd row | Air Medal | Purple Heart | American Defense Service Medal |
| 3rd row | American Campaign Medal | European-African-Middle Eastern Campaign Medal with 1 Campaign star | World War II Victory Medal |

== See also ==
- List of baseball players who died during their careers
