= Ernie Baker =

American baseball player (1875–1945)

- Pitcher
- Born: August 8, 1875; Concord, Michigan, U.S.
- Died: October 25, 1945 (aged 70); Homer, Michigan, U.S.
- Batted: Right Threw: Right

MLB debut
- August 18, 1905, for the Cincinnati Reds

Last MLB appearance
- August 18, 1905, for the Cincinnati Reds

MLB statistics
- Win–loss record: 0–0
- Earned run average: 4.50
- Strikeouts: 1
- Stats at Baseball Reference

Teams
- Cincinnati Reds (1905)

Earnest Gould Baker (August 8, 1875 – October 25, 1945) was an American professional baseball pitcher. He had a 62-74 minor league record, however, emerged as the ace of the 1903 Cotton States League champion Baton Rouge Red Sticks with a 22–9 record in 35 starts. He played in one Major League Baseball game for the Cincinnati Reds on August 18, 1905. He pitched four innings in the game, allowing seven hits and four runs.
