= Bill Southworth =

American baseball player (born 1945)

- Third baseman
- Born: November 10, 1945 (age 80); Madison, Wisconsin
- Batted: Right Threw: Right

MLB debut
- October 2, 1964, for the Milwaukee Braves

Last MLB appearance
- October 4, 1964, for the Milwaukee Braves

MLB statistics
- Games: 3
- At-bats: 7
- Hits: 2
- Stats at Baseball Reference

Teams
- Milwaukee Braves (1964)

William Frederick Southworth (born November 10, 1945) is a retired American professional baseball player and former Major League Baseball third baseman who appeared in three games for the 1964 Milwaukee Braves during a four-season pro career (1964–1967). He threw and batted right-handed, stood 6 feet 2 inches (1.88 m) tall and weighed 205 pounds (93 kg).

Southworth signed with the Braves after graduation from Webster Groves High School in the St. Louis suburb. After batting a composite .301 at the Class A level in 1964, he was placed on Milwaukee's 40-man roster in September and started two games as the Braves' third baseman on October 2 and 4, both against the Pittsburgh Pirates at Milwaukee County Stadium. He collected one hit in three at bats in each game, including a two-run home run off Earl Francis on October 4. In between those starting assignments, on October 3, he struck out as a pinch hitter. With his two hits in seven at bats, Southworth batted .286 during his MLB trial; he handled two chances in the field without an error.

Southworth returned to the minor leagues for good in the spring of 1965, playing three more years before leaving the game.

He is a cousin of Baseball Hall of Fame manager William Harold Southworth (1893–1969).
