= Billy Southworth Jr. =

American baseball player (1917–1945)

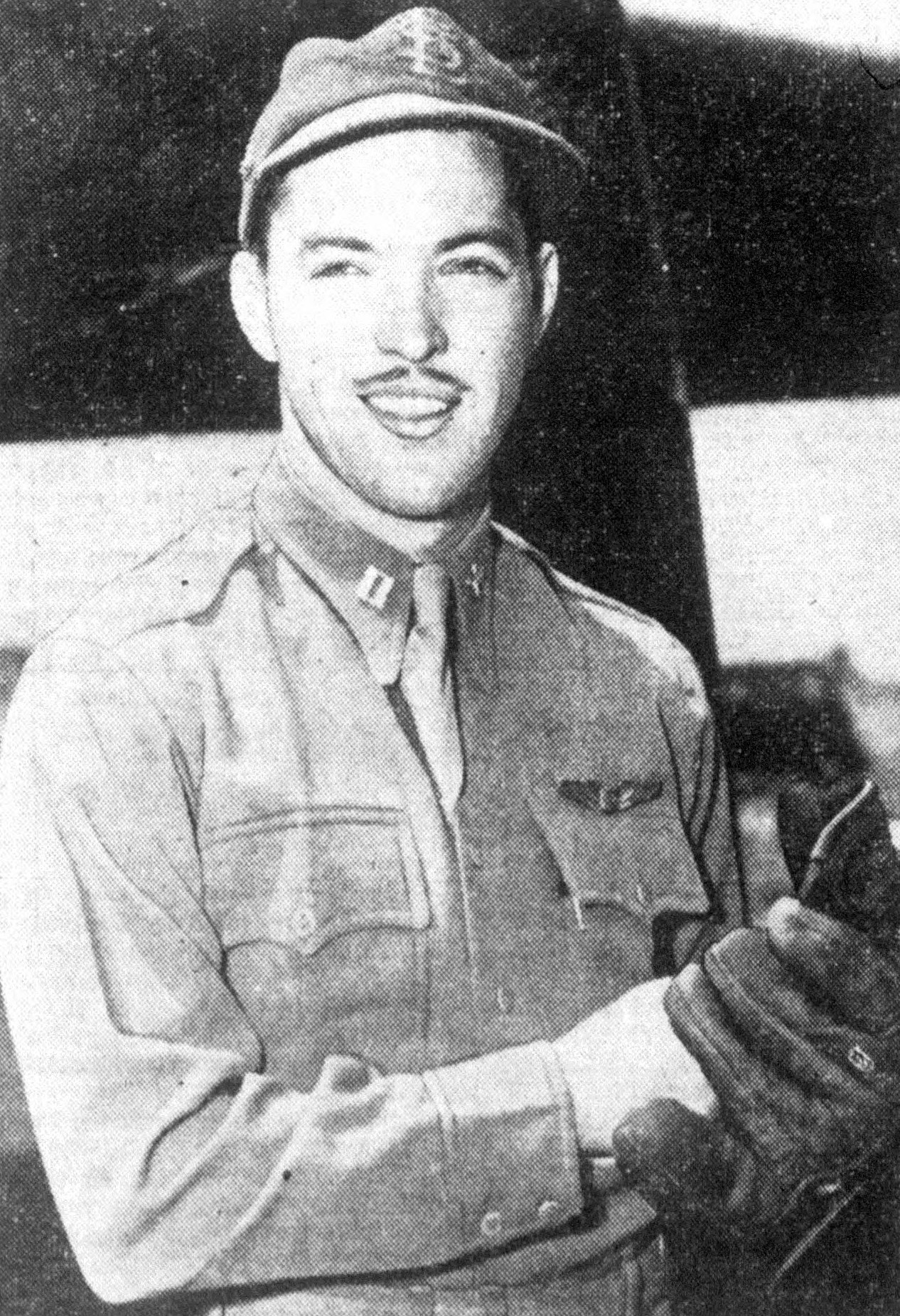
- Southworth, c. 1943
- Born: William Brooks Southworth; June 20, 1917; Portland, Oregon, U.S.
- Died: February 15, 1945 (aged 27); Queens, New York, U.S.
- Education: Ohio State University
- Occupation: Baseball player
- Years active: 1936–1940
- Father: Billy Southworth

William Brooks Southworth (June 20, 1917 – February 15, 1945) was an American professional baseball player who became a decorated bomber pilot in the United States Army Air Forces during World War II. He was the son of baseball player and manager Billy Southworth. (Note: The elder Southworth was posthumously inducted to the Baseball Hall of Fame in 2008.) While the two men had different middle names, the younger was commonly known as "Billy Southworth Jr."

== Biography ==
Southworth was born in 1917 in Portland, Oregon. His father had played for the Portland Beavers of the Pacific Coast League during 1915 and 1916 as an outfielder. The younger Southworth grew up in Columbus, Ohio. He graduated from East High School and attended Ohio State University. Also an outfielder, Southworth signed in early 1936 with the Asheville Tourists, for which his father was the manager; the team was a Minor League Baseball affiliate of the St. Louis Cardinals.

Southworth played five seasons for farm teams of the Cardinals, Cleveland Indians, and Philadelphia Athletics. Records of the era are incomplete, but he played in at least 467 minor-league games, including 102 games in 1939 with the Rome Colonels of the Canadian–American League. That season, he had a .342 batting average and was named the league's most valuable player. He reached the top minor-league level in 1940, appearing in 15 games with the Toronto Maple Leafs of the International League.

On December 12, 1940, almost a year before the Attack on Pearl Harbor, Southworth enlisted in the United States Army Air Corps, becoming one of the first American professional baseball player to enlist in the armed forces prior to World War II. Rising to the rank of major, Southworth was awarded the Distinguished Flying Cross and Air Medal after completing 25 bombing missions in the European Theater of Operations in 1942 and 1943. In early 1945, he died at age 27 while leading flight training for the Boeing B-29 Superfortress, when his aircraft crashed into Flushing Bay, off the Borough of Queens in New York City. Four other aircrew died in the crash. He is buried at Green Lawn Cemetery in Columbus, Ohio.
